= Deaths in December 2022 =

The following is a list of notable deaths in December 2022.

Entries for each day are listed alphabetically by surname. A typical entry lists information in the following sequence:

- Name, age, country of citizenship at birth, subsequent country of citizenship (if applicable), reason for notability, cause of death (if known), and reference.

== December 2022 ==
=== 1 ===
- Ferry Mursyidan Baldan, 61, Indonesian politician, minister of land and spatial planning (2014–2016) and MP (1997–2009)
- Ercole Baldini, 89, Italian cyclist, Olympic champion (1956).
- Steffen Basho-Junghans, 69, German guitarist and composer, cancer.
- Gerardo Bianco, 91, Italian politician, minister of education (1990–1991) and deputy (1968–1994, 2001–2008).
- Norm Brown, 79, Australian footballer (Fitzroy).
- Kypros Chrysostomides, 80, Cypriot lawyer and politician, MP (2006–2008).
- Skip Cleaver, 78, American politician, member of the New Hampshire House of Representatives (2016–2022).
- Thomas C. Corrigan, 84, American politician, member of the Pennsylvania House of Representatives (1987–2006).
- Mylène Demongeot, 87, French actress (The Crucible, French California, 36 Quai des Orfèvres), primary peritoneal carcinoma.
- J. C. Heywood, 81, Canadian artist.
- Hannes Keller, 88, Swiss mathematician and deep diver.
- Igor Krichever, 72, Russian academic and mathematician.
- Gary LaPaille, 68, American politician, member of the Illinois Senate (1993–1995), complications from amyotrophic lateral sclerosis.
- Sylvia La Torre, 89, Filipino actress (One Two Bato, Three Four Bapor) and singer.
- Quentin Oliver Lee, 34, American baritone and actor (The Phantom of the Opera), colon cancer.
- Lu Zhuguo, 94, Chinese screenwriter (The Great Military March Forward: Engulf the Southwest, On the Mountain of Tai Hang) and writer.
- Yadollah Maftun Amini, 96, Iranian poet, cardiac arrest.
- Abdul Hamid Pawanteh, 78, Malaysian politician, twice MP, Menteri Besar of Perlis (1986–1995) and president of the Dewan Negara (2003–2009).
- Ludwik Peretz, 99, French architect.
- Gaylord Perry, 84, American Hall of Fame baseball player (San Francisco Giants, Cleveland Indians, San Diego Padres), complications from COVID-19.
- Vasu Pisharody, 79, Indian Kathakali actor, heart disease.
- Dorothy Pitman Hughes, 84, American feminist.
- Fizzy Qwick, 69, American singer.
- Julia Reichert, 76, American documentarian (American Factory, Seeing Red, Union Maids), Oscar winner (2019), bladder cancer.
- Alain Sailhac, 87, French chef.
- Harald Schießl, 48, German jurist, judge of the Federal Fiscal Court (since 2015).
- Eve Shapiro, 92, South African-born American theatre director.
- Haralds Sīmanis, 71, Latvian singer.
- Samresh Singh, 81, Indian politician, Jharkhand (2009–2014) and four-time Bihar MLA.
- Andrew Speight, 58, Australian-born American saxophonist, struck by train.
- Ken Stephanson, 81, Canadian ice hockey player (Winnipeg Jets).
- Omar Trujillo, 45, Mexican footballer (Morelia, Celaya, national team), cardiac arrest.
- Bridgette Wimberly, 68, American playwright and librettist (Charlie Parker's Yardbird), complications from strokes.
- Yoo Jae-geon, 85, South Korean politician, MNA (1996–2008).

=== 2 ===
- Afzaal Ahmad, 52, Pakistani actor (Permit, Malanga, Mukhra), brain haemorrhage.
- Assem Allam, 83, Egyptian-British football executive, chairman of Hull City (2010–2022), cancer.
- Tony Allen, 83, English footballer (Stoke City, Bury, national team).
- Imran Aslam, 70, Pakistani journalist, screenwriter (Parey Hut Love) and media personality.
- Mahmoud Bayati, 94, Iranian football player (Taj, national team) and manager.
- Walter Broadnax, 78, American academic administrator and professor of politics.
- Jaume Camps i Rovira, 78, Spanish lawyer and politician, member of the Catalan parliament (1980–2005).
- Daniel Catovsky, 85, Argentine-born British cancer researcher.
- Choi Byung-ryeol, 84, South Korean politician, mayor of Seoul (1994–1995).
- Joseph Cigana, 89, French racing cyclist.
- Sam A. Crow, 96, American jurist, judge of the U.S. District Court for the District of Kansas (since 1981).
- Jharana Das, 82, Indian actress (Malajahna, Adina Megha, Hisab Nikas) and radio announcer.
- Phil Edmonston, 78, American-born Canadian consumer advocate and politician, MP (1990–1993).
- Dick Enthoven, 85, South African insurance executive, owner of Nando's (since 2014), cancer.
- Jeffrey Friedman, 63, American political scientist (Critical Review).
- Tukaram Gangadhar Gadakh, 69, Indian politician, MP (2004–2009), heart failure.
- Danny Goldring, 76, American actor (Boss, Search for Tomorrow, The Dark Knight).
- Carolyn Grace, 70, Australian-British pilot, traffic collision.
- Raúl Guerra Garrido, 87, Spanish writer.
- Najma Hameed, 78, Pakistani politician, senator (2009–2021).
- Doreen Hamilton, 71, Canadian politician, Saskatchewan MLA (1991–2007) and mayor of Regina (1988), cancer.
- Jill Jolliffe, 77, Australian journalist and author.
- Yoshio Kikugawa, 78, Japanese football player (Mitsubishi Motors, national team) and manager (Chuo Bohan), pneumonia.
- Dominique Lapierre, 91, French writer (City of Joy, Is Paris Burning?, O Jerusalem!).
- Floris Maljers, 89, Dutch business executive, CEO of Unilever (1984–1994).
- Louis Negin, 93, British-born Canadian actor (Get Charlie Tully, Rabid, Physical Evidence).
- Jo Carol Pierce, 78, American singer-songwriter and playwright, cancer.
- Abune Qerlos, 94, Eritrean prelate, patriarch of the Eritrean Orthodox Tewahedo Church (since 2021).
- Duncan Robinson, 79, British art historian and academic.
- Gaddis Smith, 90, American historian and foreign policy expert.
- Laila Storch, 101, American oboist.
- Al Strobel, 82, American actor (Twin Peaks, Child of Darkness, Child of Light, Megaville).
- Tiit-Rein Viitso, 84, Estonian linguist.

=== 3 ===
- Guy Benveniste, 95, French-born American organization theorist.
- Willi Blodt, 93, German politician, member of the Landtag of Hesse (1966–1970).
- Gordon Bradt, 98, American art designer.
- Paul Broughton, 91, Australian rugby league player (St. George) and coach (Balmain, Newtown).
- Kenneth O. Chilstrom, 101, American air force colonel and test pilot.
- Michael Collins, 82, Irish politician, TD (1997–2007).
- John Edward Critien, 73, Maltese Roman Catholic official, grand chancellor of the Sovereign Military Order of Malta (2016–2017).
- Jamie Freeman, 57, British singer and songwriter, brain cancer.
- Milton Gómez, 74, Bolivian mining union leader and politician, minister of labor, employment, and social security (2019).
- Ursula Hayden, 56, American professional wrestler (Gorgeous Ladies of Wrestling) and actress, cancer.
- Svenne Hedlund, 77, Swedish singer (Hep Stars, Idolerna, Svenne and Lotta).
- Sonny Holland, 84, American football player and coach (Montana State Bobcats).
- Chuck Horn, 98, American politician.
- Leslie Houlden, 93, British Anglican priest and academic.
- Antigone Kefala, 87, Romanian-born Australian poet.
- Jim Kolbe, 80, American politician, member of the U.S. House of Representatives (1985–2007) and Arizona Senate (1977–1982), stroke.
- Volodymyr Kozhukhar, 81, Ukrainian classical conductor.
- Robert W. Layer, 94, American chemist.
- Ann MacIntosh Duff, 97, Canadian artist.
- Angelo Marciani, 94, Italian Olympic water polo player (1956).
- Colin McLay, 80, New Zealand marine biologist.
- A. B. M. Ghulam Mostafa, 88, Bangladeshi businessman and politician, MP (2008–2014).
- Bobby Naughton, 78, American jazz vibraphonist and pianist.
- Annie Yellowe Palma, 60, British poet, author and child protection advocate.
- Kochu Preman, 67, Indian actor (Dilliwala Rajakumaran, Udayon, My Big Father) and comedian.
- Gina Romand, 84, Cuban-Mexican actress (I Am Very Macho, Immediate Delivery, Los astronautas).
- Ilya Shtemler, 89, Russian writer, COVID-19.
- Svyatoslav Sokol, 76, Russian politician, deputy (1995–2003, 2007–2016), heart attack.
- Eduardo Vio Grossi, 78, Chilean lawyer and academic, judge of the Inter-American Court of Human Rights (2010–2021).
- Alfons Vogtel, 70, German businessman and politician, member of the Landtag of Saarland (1985–2007).
- Tony Waldrop, 70, American middle-distance runner and academic administrator, president of the University of South Alabama (2014–2021).
- Alexandre Zelkine, 84, French folk music singer and rail transport modelist.
- Alzhan Zharmukhamedov, 78, Kazakh basketball player (CSKA Moscow, Soviet Union national team) and coach, Olympic champion (1972).

=== 4 ===
- Amable Aristy, 73, Dominican politician, member (1990–1999, since 2010) and president (1994–1998) of the senate, cardiac arrest.
- Bruce M. Bailey, 87, American author.
- Jerry Berndt, 84, American football coach (Dartmouth Big Green).
- June Blair, 90, American model and actress (The Adventures of Ozzie and Harriet, Hell Bound, The Rabbit Trap).
- Nick Bollettieri, 91, American Hall of Fame tennis coach.
- Dominic Boreham, 77, British-born French artist.
- Hamadi Bousbiaâ, 88, Tunisian businessman and sporting director.
- Saïd Chibane, 97, Algerian doctor and politician, minister of religious affairs and endowments (1989–1991).
- Yuriy Dubrovin, 83, Russian-Ukrainian actor (D'Artagnan and Three Musketeers, Trial on the Road, The Prisoner of Château d'If).
- Emanuel Epstein, 106, German-born American plant physiologist and biochemist.
- Horst Faber, 101, German figure skater.
- Mofeed Fawzy, 89, Egyptian journalist (Rose al-Yūsuf) and television presenter (Al Qahera Al Youm).
- Barry Fraser, 82, Canadian ice hockey executive (Edmonton Oilers).
- Manuel Göttsching, 70, German musician (Ash Ra Tempel, Ashra) and composer (E2-E4).
- Peter Hedger, 82, British racehorse trainer.
- Saeed Mohammad Khan, 87, Pakistani naval officer, chief of naval staff (1991–1994) and chairman of PNSC (1988–1990).
- Kevin Kilmurray, 72, Irish Gaelic footballer (Offaly).
- Magomedali Magomedov, 92, Russian politician, chairman of the State Council of Dagestan (1994–2006).
- Bob McGrath, 90, American actor (Sesame Street, Follow That Bird) and singer (Sing Along with Mitch), complications from a stroke.
- Karl Merkatz, 92, Austrian actor (Ein echter Wiener geht nicht unter, Der Bockerer, Lethal Obsession).
- Norm Pattiz, 79, American broadcaster and business executive (Westwood One, Podcast One).
- Patrick Peacock, 79, Canadian lawyer, president of the Canadian Bar Association (1988–1989).
- Pablo Puente, 91, Spanish Roman Catholic prelate, apostolic nuncio to Indonesia (1980–1986), Lebanon (1989–1997) and Kuwait (1993–1997).
- Antonio Recalcati, 84, Italian painter and sculptor.
- Jacqueline Rigaud, 97, French resistance fighter, Righteous Among the Nations (2017).
- Gino Scarpa, 98, Italian-born Norwegian painter, printmaker and sculptor.
- Alex Sherzer, 51, American chess grandmaster and physician.
- Patrick Tambay, 73, French racing driver (Formula One), complications from Parkinson's disease.
- Robert E. Tranquada, 92, American physician and academic administrator.
- Jeffrey James West, 72, British Anglican priest.

=== 5 ===
- Kirstie Alley, 71, American actress (Cheers, Veronica's Closet, Look Who's Talking), Emmy winner (1991, 1994), colon cancer.
- Ahmad Ali Barqi Azmi, 67, Indian poet.
- John Beckwith, 95, Canadian composer, writer and pianist.
- Georges Caudron, 70, French actor and artistic director (Médecins de nuit).
- Marshall Chrisman, 89, American businessman and politician.
- František Dostál, 84, Czech photographer.
- L. Patrick Engel, 90, American politician, member of the Nebraska Legislature (1993–2009).
- Hamsou Garba, 63, Nigerien singer.
- Isaac T. Gillam, 90, American aerospace engineer.
- Jay Goldberg, 89, American lawyer and author.
- Mária Kráľovičová, 95, Slovak actress.
- Penelope Mackie, 69, British philosopher.
- John McGeever, 83, American football player (Denver Broncos, Miami Dolphins).
- Jost Meier, 83, Swiss composer and orchestral conductor.
- Anthea Millett, 81, British educator.
- Marie-Édouard Mununu, 86, Congolese Roman Catholic prelate, auxiliary bishop (1985–1986) and bishop of Kikwit (1986–2016).
- Dominga Neculmán, 84–85, Chilean Mapuche potter.
- Terrence O'Hara, 76, American television director (NCIS, Smallville, Grimm), cancer.
- Eduard Ovčáček, 89, Czech graphic artist.
- Éric Pfrunder, 74, French artistic director.
- Bernd Rohr, 85, German racing cyclist.
- Hélène Roussel, 90, French actress (The Apprentices, A Christmas Tale).
- Bernadette Carey Smith, 83, American journalist (The New York Times, The Washington Post).
- Jim Stewart, 92, American Hall of Fame record producer, co-founder of Stax Records.
- Sahibzada Nazir Sultan, 78, Pakistani politician, MNA (1970–1985, 1988–1997, 2013–2018).
- Ronaldo Veitía, 75, Cuban judo coach, complications from diabetes.
- Sam Wakim, 85, Canadian lawyer and politician, MP (1979–1980).

=== 6 ===
- Yoginder K Alagh, 83, Indian economist, chairman of IRMA (2006–2012).
- Risto Alapuro, 78, Finnish sociologist.
- James Alty, 83, British computer scientist.
- Miha Baloh, 94, Slovenian actor (And Love Has Vanished, Among Vultures, Winnetou and the Crossbreed).
- Jet Black, 84, English drummer (The Stranglers).
- Antonio D'Amico, 63, Italian fashion designer.
- Andrée Damant, 93, French actress (Plus belle la vie, Amélie, Belle and Sebastian).
- Jan-Åke Edvinsson, 81, Swedish Hall of Fame ice hockey administrator, general secretary of IIHF (1986–2006).
- Ward Elliott, 85, American political scientist.
- Alain Fousseret, 66, French politician, member of the Regional Council of Franche-Comté (since 1998).
- Beto Fuscão, 72, Brazilian footballer (América, Grêmio, national team), stomach cancer.
- Pavel Gajdoš, 86, Czech Olympic gymnast (1960, 1964).
- Ronald Harkai, 76, American drummer.
- Huang Kezhi, 95, Chinese physicist, member of the Chinese Academy of Sciences.
- Hamish Kilgour, 65, New Zealand musician (The Clean, Bailter Space). (body discovered on this date)
- Hy Kloc, 75, German-born American politician, member of the Idaho House of Representatives (2012–2018), heart attack.
- Edino Krieger, 94, Brazilian composer and conductor.
- Mills Lane, 85, American boxing referee and television personality (Judge Mills Lane, Celebrity Deathmatch).
- David Lifton, 83, American author.
- S. A. Malek, 86, Bangladeshi politician, MP (1973–1979).
- Pavao Miljavac, 69, Croatian politician, minister of defence (1998–2000).
- Ichirou Mizuki, 74, Japanese composer (JAM Project) and voice actor, lung cancer.
- John Neter, 99, German-born American statistician.
- Worthy Patterson, 91, American basketball player (St. Louis Hawks).
- Zenon Pylyshyn, 85, Canadian cognitive scientist and philosopher.
- Jacques Pousaz, 75, Swiss Olympic ice hockey player (1972), heart attack.
- Salinero, 28, Dutch dressage horse, Olympic champion (2004, 2008). (death announced on this date)
- Adolfas Šleževičius, 74, Lithuanian politician, prime minister (1993–1996).
- François Tanguy, 64, French theatre director.
- Omar Varela, 65, Uruguayan playwright and stage actor, complications from Parkinson's disease.
- Bart de Vries, 57, Dutch actor (Punk Lawyer, Left Luggage, Het Woeden der Gehele Wereld), COVID-19.

=== 7 ===
- Edward Avedisian, 85, American clarinetist and philanthropist.
- Karim Bavi, 57, Iranian footballer (Shahin, Persepolis, national team), bladder cancer.
- Jaroslav Bogdálek, 93, Czech Olympic alpine skier (1956).
- Bernhard Brinkmann, 70, German politician, MP (1998–2013).
- Jacques Ciron, 94, French actor (And God Created Woman, The Brain, Frantic).
- Margaret Davis, 89, Australian politician, New South Wales MLA (1967–1978).
- Manohar Devadoss, 86, Indian visual artist and writer.
- John Dodge, 89, British paediatrician.
- Jim Fosgate, 85, American inventor and engineer.
- Armando González, 91, Spanish Olympic rower (1960).
- Carl Hewitt, 77, American computer scientist.
- W. Kenneth Holditch, 89, American literature scholar.
- Clive Inman, 86, Sri Lankan cricketer (Leicestershire, national team).
- Roddy Jackson, 80, American rockabilly singer, songwriter and pianist.
- Jann-Peter Janssen, 77, German politician, MP (1994–2005).
- Johnny Johnson, 101, British Royal Air Force officer (Operation Chastise).
- Ákos Kertész, 90, Hungarian writer and screenwriter.
- George Kuwayama, 97, American art curator.
- Richard C. Macke, 84, American naval admiral.
- George Marinkovich, 93, American football player and coach (Montana State Bobcats).
- Jan Nowicki, 83, Polish actor (Colonel Wolodyjowski, Spiral, Magnat).
- Rubby Opio Aweri, 69, Ugandan jurist, justice of the Supreme Court (since 2015).
- Ronald Sherr, 70, American painter.
- Helen Slayton-Hughes, 92, American actress (Parks and Recreation, Crazy on the Outside, Moxie).
- Herbert Volney, 69, Trinidadian jurist and politician, judge of the Supreme Court (1994–2010), MP (2010–2015).
- Stevan Vrbaški, 81–82, Serbian politician, mayor of Novi Sad (1997–2000).
- Harry Yee, 104, American bartender, inventor of the Blue Hawaii.

=== 8 ===
- Jean-Louis Bourgeois, 82, American author.
- Albert Brenner, 96, American production designer (Bullitt, Beaches, Backdraft).
- David J. A. Clines, 84, Australian biblical scholar.
- John T. C. B. Collins, 97, British Anglican priest.
- Elinor G. Constable, 88, American diplomat.
- Djalma Corrêa, 80, Brazilian percussionist and composer, pancreatic cancer.
- Patrick Delsemme, 48, Belgian snooker player.
- Tom Flanigan, 88, American baseball player (Chicago White Sox, St. Louis Cardinals).
- Sylvia Flores, 71, Belizean politician, speaker of the House of Representatives (1998–2001) and president of the Senate (2001–2003).
- Gary Fox, 78, Canadian politician, Ontario MPP (1995–1999), cancer.
- Rostam Ghasemi, 58, Iranian military officer and politician, minister of petroleum (2011–2013) and roads (2021–2022), cancer.
- Aldona Gustas, 90, Lithuanian-German poet and illustrator.
- Martha Hildebrandt, 97, Peruvian linguist and politician, member (1995–2001, 2006–2011) and president (1999–2000) of the congress.
- Ian Hunter, 83, New Zealand naval officer, chief of naval staff (1991–1994).
- Miodrag Ješić, 64, Serbian football player (Yugoslavia national team) and manager (Partizan, Altay), traffic collision.
- Yitzhak Klepter, 72, Israeli singer-songwriter, composer and guitarist (The Churchills, Kaveret).
- Leno, 73, Brazilian singer, composer, and guitarist, cancer.
- Lee Lorenz, 90, American cartoonist and editor (The New Yorker).
- Albert Madansky, 88, American statistician.
- Jackie McLeod, 92, Canadian ice hockey player (New York Rangers) and coach (national team, Saskatoon Blades).
- Richard Miller, 80, American visual effects artist (Star Trek, Pirates of the Caribbean, The Rocketeer).
- Rizong Rinpoche, 94, Tibetan Buddhist monk, Ganden Tripa (2009–2016).
- Maurice Robert, 92, French academic and ethnologist.
- Max van Rooy, 80, Dutch writer and journalist (NRC Handelsblad).
- Lidia Elsa Satragno, 87, Argentine actress (La caída) and politician, deputy (2007–2011).
- Kevin Schamehorn, 66, Canadian ice hockey player (Detroit Red Wings, Los Angeles Kings).
- René Snelders, 85, Belgian footballer (Beerschot AC, Royal Antwerp) and businessman.
- Kent Stermon, 50, American businessman and political activist, suicide by gunshot.
- Kayf Tara, 28, British Thoroughbred racehorse.
- Todor Todorov, 94, Bulgarian Olympic gymnast (1952).
- Martha Urioste, 85, American school principal.
- Erasmus Desiderius Wandera, 92, Ugandan Roman Catholic prelate, bishop of Soroti (1981–2007).
- Yoshishige Yoshida, 89, Japanese film director (Coup d'Etat, A Promise, Women in the Mirror) and screenwriter, pneumonia.

=== 9 ===
- Pedro Miguel Arce, 46, Nicaraguan-born Canadian actor (True Blue, Land of the Dead, Are We Done Yet?), cancer.
- Jovit Baldivino, 29, Filipino singer (Pilipinas Got Talent) and actor, intracranial aneurysm.
- Scott M. Bennett, 45, American politician, member of the Illinois Senate (since 2015), complications from a brain tumor.
- John Burton, 95, Canadian politician, MP (1968–1972).
- Virginia Carver, 87, American baseball player (South Bend Blue Sox, Fort Wayne Daisies).
- Bob Cooper, 67, Australian rugby league player (Western Suburbs), cancer.
- Patricia Daly, 66, American nun.
- Herbert Deutsch, 90, American composer, co-inventor of the Moog synthesizer.
- Gene Edwards, 90, American house church planter.
- Martin Forde, 99, Irish-born American labor union activist.
- Ademar José Gevaerd, 60, Brazilian ufologist, complications from a fall.
- Jonathan Goldberg, 79, American literary theorist.
- Qamar Gula, 70, Afghan singer, cancer.
- Mihály Huszka, 89, Hungarian Olympic weightlifter (1960, 1964).
- Joseph Kittinger, 94, American air force officer and command pilot (Project Manhigh, Project Excelsior), lung cancer.
- Judith Lauand, 100, Brazilian painter and printmaker.
- Ruth Madoc, 79, British actress (Hi-de-Hi!, Fiddler on the Roof, Little Britain), and singer.
- Daniel Micallef, 94, Maltese diplomat and politician, speaker of the House of Representatives (1982–1986).
- Lucien Mongrain, 90, Canadian politician, mayor of Trois-Rives (since 1981).
- Abraham Nehmé, 95, Syrian Melkite Greek Catholic prelate, archbishop of Homs (1986–2005).
- Christopher Nigel Page, 80, English botanist.
- Txomin Peillen, 90, French writer, linguist, and biologist.
- Soko Shimabuku, 96, Japanese politician, member of the House of Councillors (1992–2004).
- Barrington Tabb, 88, English painter.
- Fredrick Terna, 99, Austrian-born American painter and Holocaust survivor.
- Jean-Nickolaus Tretter, 76, American LGBTQ activist and archivist.
- Milton Viorst, 92, American journalist (The New Yorker), complications from COVID-19.
- Wes Wise, 94, American politician, mayor of Dallas (1971–1976).
- David Young, Baron Young of Graffham, 90, British politician, secretary of state for trade and industry (1987–1989) and employment (1985–1987), member of the House of Lords (1984–2022).

=== 10 ===
- John Aler, 73, American lyric tenor.
- John Allen, 80, British rugby union player and administrator (Leicester Tigers).
- J. J. Barnes, 79, American R&B singer.
- Walter Bénéteau, 50, French racing cyclist.
- Richard Bober, 79, American artist.
- Dave Bolen, 98, American Olympic sprinter (1948) and diplomat, ambassador to Botswana (1974–1976), Lesotho (1974–1976) and East Germany (1977–1980).
- Sulochana Chavan, 89, Indian Marathi singer (Sawaal Majha Aika!).
- Salah Fadl, 84, Egyptian writer and translator.
- John Fogarty, 75, New Zealand jurist, king's counsel (since 1990), judge of the High Court (2003–2017).
- Charles E. Grainger, 85, American politician, member of the Alabama House of Representatives (1970–1974).
- Dame Beryl Grey, 95, English ballerina.
- Tracy Hitchings, 60, English singer (Landmarq), cancer.
- Georgia Holt, 96, American singer and actress (Watch the Birdie, Grounds for Marriage), subject of Dear Mom, Love Cher.
- Quin Ivy, 85, American disc jockey and songwriter.
- Gabor Kalman, 92, Hungarian-American physicist.
- Tony Lancaster, 84, British-American Bayesian econometrician.
- Victor Lewis-Smith, 65, British writer and producer (In Confidence).
- Antonio Mazzone, 87, Italian lawyer and politician, deputy (1983–1989, 1994–1996), MEP (1989–1994).
- John Molyneux, 74, British Trotskyist.
- Tshala Muana, 64, Congolese singer (La Vie est Belle, Aya of Yop City).
- Rocky Pamplin, 73, American model and bodyguard (Brian Wilson).
- Aziouz Raïs, 68, Algerian chaabi singer.
- Otto Seidl, 90, German judge, vice-president of the Federal Constitutional Court (1995–1998).
- Paul Silas, 79, American basketball player (Boston Celtics, Seattle SuperSonics) and coach (Charlotte Hornets), cardiac arrest.
- José Ángel Trelles, 78, Argentine singer, musician and composer.
- Soňa Valentová, 76, Slovak actress (Witchhammer, The Feather Fairy, Requiem pro panenku).
- Kihnu Virve, 94, Estonian folk singer.
- Grant Wahl, 49, American sports journalist (Sports Illustrated) and author (The Beckham Experiment), aortic aneurysm.
- David L. Wilkinson, 86, American politician, attorney general of Utah (1981–1989).
- Ryuji Yamane, 74, Japanese politician, member of the House of Councillors (2001–2013), lung cancer.

=== 11 ===
- Angelo Badalamenti, 85, American film and television composer (Twin Peaks, Blue Velvet, Mulholland Drive), Grammy winner (1991).
- Pravrajika Bhaktiprana, 102, Indian Hindu nun, president of Sri Sarada Math (since 2009).
- Chris Boucher, 79, British television screenwriter (Doctor Who, Blake's 7, Shoestring) and novelist.
- Bobby Cassidy, 78, American boxer and actor.
- Petr Čech, 78, Czech Olympic hurdler (1972).
- Munzur Çem, 77, Turkish writer and journalist.
- Geoff Doidge, 68, South African politician, minister of public works (2008–2010).
- Wolf Erlbruch, 74, German illustrator and writer (Duck, Death and the Tulip, 's Nachts, The Story of the Little Mole Who Knew It Was None of His Business).
- Peter Ester, 69, Dutch sociologist and politician, senator (since 2011).
- Joke Folmer, 99, Dutch resistance fighter.
- Ed Goorjian, 96, American college basketball coach (Loyola Marymount).
- Frances Hesselbein, 107, American management consultant, CEO of Girl Scouts of the USA (1976–1990).
- Mel James, 74, Welsh rugby union (Swansea) and league (St Helens, national team) player.
- Neal Jimenez, 62, American film director (The Waterdance) and screenwriter (River's Edge, Hideaway).
- Effie Kapsalis, 51, American open access advocate, suicide.
- Abigail Kinoiki Kekaulike Kawānanakoa, 96, American Hawaiian royal princess, complications of a stroke.
- Joseph Kromelis, 75, American street vendor, complications from burn injuries.
- Klemens Ludwig, 66, German astrologist and writer, complications from amyotrophic lateral sclerosis.
- Adrienne Mancia, 95, American film curator.
- Bruce J. McFarlane, 84, Australian economist.
- Moshe Mizrahi, 72, Israeli politician, MK (2013–2015, 2018–2019).
- Kenneth Powell, 82, Indian Olympic sprinter (1964).
- T. Radhakrishnan, 67, Indian politician, MP (2014–2019), heart attack.
- Pieter ter Veer, 77, Dutch politician, MP (1981–1982, 1989–2002).

=== 12 ===
- Jonas Abib, 85, Brazilian Roman Catholic priest, founder of Canção Nova, multiple myeloma.
- Alberto Alessi, 83, Italian politician, deputy (1981–1983, 1987–1994).
- Janet Beavin Bavelas, 82, American-born Canadian experimental social psychologist.
- Norman Bogner, 87, American author (Seventh Avenue).
- Ekambi Brillant, 74, Cameroonian makossa singer.
- Jim Carr, 71, Canadian politician, MP (since 2015), minister of natural resources (2015–2018) and international trade diversification (2018–2019), multiple myeloma.
- Don Christopher, 87, American garlic farmer, founder of Christopher Ranch.
- Drucilla Cornell, 72, American philosopher and feminist theorist.
- Philippa Roe, Baroness Couttie, 60, British politician, leader of Westminster City Council (2012–2017) and member of the House of Lords (since 2016), cancer.
- Ciro Cruz Zepeda, 77, Salvadoran politician, president of the Legislative Assembly (2000–2001, 2002–2006, 2009–2011).
- William P. Curlin Jr., 89, American politician, member of the Kentucky (1968–1971) and United States House of Representatives (1971–1973).
- Maurice Desnoyers, 95, Canadian architect (Autostade).
- Assunção dos Anjos, 76, Angolan diplomat, minister of external relations (2008–2010), heart attack.
- José Esquivel, 87, American painter.
- Iván Faragó, 76, Hungarian chess grandmaster.
- Alexander Floyd, 96, Australian botanist.
- Charles Fulton, 84, American minister.
- John Gregory, 84, American football coach (Winnipeg Blue Bombers, Saskatchewan Roughriders, Iowa Barnstormers).
- Mirosław Hermaszewski, 81, Polish cosmonaut (Soyuz 30).
- Michael Hodgetts, 86, English Catholic historian.
- Ralph Hooper, 96, English aeronautical engineer.
- Chaudhry Saeed Iqbal, 56, Pakistani politician, MNA (2008–2013), cardiac arrest.
- Mohan Jena, 65, Indian politician, MP (2004–2014).
- Zoe Klusáková-Svobodová, 97, Czech economist, academic and author.
- Lado Kralj, 84, Slovenian theatre critic and literary historian.
- Mike Leach, 61, American college football coach (Texas Tech Red Raiders, Washington State Cougars, Mississippi State Bulldogs), heart disease.
- Kurt Linder, 89, German football player (Urania Genève Sport, Rot-Weiss Essen) and manager (Young Boys).
- Grenville Llewellyn Lucas, 86, British botanist and conservationist.
- Stuart Margolin, 82, American actor (The Rockford Files, Death Wish, Bret Maverick), Emmy winner (1979, 1980), pancreatic cancer.
- Kim Mohan, 73, American game designer (Dungeons & Dragons).
- Claude Mossé, 97, French historian.
- Hermann Nuber, 87, German footballer (Kickers Offenbach).
- Gosaku Ota, 74, Japanese manga artist (Groizer X, Mazinger Z, Grendizer), COVID-19.
- Latinka Perović, 89, Serbian historian and politician.
- Sheila Russell, 87, American politician, mayor of Cambridge, Massachusetts (1996–1997).
- Josef Schagerl, 99, Austrian sculptor.
- Sheridan Snyder, 86, American entrepreneur.
- Anton Šoltýs, 85, Slovak Olympic alpine skier (1964).
- Jacqueline Stanley, 94, British-Irish painter.
- Remy Sylado, 77, Indonesian author.
- Teh Hong Piow, 92, Malaysian banker, founder of Public Bank Berhad.
- Erik Tønseth, 76, Norwegian industrialist, CEO of Kværner (1989–1998).
- Zbigniew Wawer, 66, Polish academic and historian.
- Wolfgang Ziffer, 81, German actor and radio personality.

=== 13 ===
- Alauddin Ahammad, 74, Bangladeshi academic administrator and politician, MP (1999–2006), vice-chancellor of Jahangirnagar University (1998–1999).
- Miguel Barbosa Huerta, 63, Mexican politician, governor of Puebla (since 2019), deputy (2000–2003) and senator (2012–2018).
- Lauri Bergqvist, 92, Finnish Olympic cross-country skier (1964).
- Mary Holiday Black, 84, American Navajo basket maker and textile weaver.
- Stephen "tWitch" Boss, 40, American dancer, television personality (The Ellen DeGeneres Show, So You Think You Can Dance) and actor (Step Up), suicide by gunshot.
- Willard L. Boyd, 95, American academic administrator, president of the University of Iowa (1969–1981).
- Ranjit Singh Brahmpura, 85, Indian politician, MP (2014–2019) and Punjab MLA (1977–1980, 1997–2012).
- Ronnie R. Campbell, 68, American politician, member of the Virginia House of Delegates (since 2019), cancer.
- Paul Chollet, 94, French politician, deputy (1986–1997), mayor of Agen (1989–2001).
- Luis "Checho" González, 89, Chilean musician.
- Grand Daddy I.U., 54, American rapper (Juice Crew).
- Geoffrey Wilson Greenwood, 93, British materials scientist.
- Ludwig Hoffmann-Rumerstein, 85, Austrian Roman Catholic official, grand commander (2014–2019) and lieutenant ad interim (2017) of the Sovereign Military Order of Malta.
- Jean Landis, 104, American World War II aviator (Women Airforce Service Pilots).
- Alejandro Luna, 83, Mexican scenographer.
- Sir John MacDermott, 95, Northern Irish jurist, judge of the high court (1973–1998).
- Sylvester Mubayi, 80, Zimbabwean sculptor.
- Mikhail Musatov, 72, Russian politician, deputy (since 1995).
- Nihal Nelson, 76, Sri Lankan vocalist and songwriter, heart attack.
- Maxine Neuman, 74, American cellist, cancer.
- Bayan Northcott, 82, English music critic (The Independent, BBC Music Magazine) and composer.
- Han Peekel, 75, Dutch television presenter, heart failure.
- David Ramsbotham, Baron Ramsbotham, 88, British military officer and life peer, member of the House of Lords (since 2005), fall.
- Lalo Rodríguez, 64, Puerto Rican salsa singer ("Ven, Devórame Otra Vez").
- Leo Rosschou, 93, Danish Olympic racewalker (1960).
- Frank Salemme, 89, American mobster (Patriarca crime family).
- Adrian Shooter, 74, British transport executive, founder of Vivarail and member of the Royal Academy of Engineering, assisted suicide.
- Kim Simmonds, 75, British rock guitarist (Savoy Brown), colon cancer.
- Curt Simmons, 93, American baseball player (Philadelphia Phillies, St. Louis Cardinals, Chicago Cubs), World Series champion (1964).
- Michael Vickery, 75, British colonel.
- Richard Wurtman, 86, American neuroscientist.

=== 14 ===
- Bert Beverly Beach, 94, Swiss-born American Adventist theologian.
- Constantin Dinu, 77, Romanian rugby union player (Știința Petroșani, national team).
- Djene Djento, 58–59, Cameroonian singer-songwriter.
- Alex Duchart, 89, Scottish footballer (East Fife, Dumbarton, Falkirk).
- Karel van Eerd, 84, Dutch businessman (Jumbo).
- Fritz Feuz, 91, Swiss Olympic gymnast (1960, 1964).
- Jean Franco, 98, British-born American academic and literary critic.
- Riccardo Giovanelli, 76, Italian-born American astronomer.
- John Hughes, 92, British-born American journalist (The Christian Science Monitor, Deseret News), Pulitzer Prize winner (1967).
- Kornélia Ihász, 85, Hungarian Olympic speed skater (1964).
- Roch Kereszty, 89, Hungarian-American monk and scholar.
- Wulf Kirsten, 88, German poet, novelist, and publisher.
- Franz Kurzreiter, 78, Austrian politician, member of the Landtag of Lower Austria (1986–2003).
- Jacob Luitjens, 103, Dutch Nazi collaborator.
- Alfons Messerschmitt, 79, German Olympic sport shooter (1988).
- Charlene Mitchell, 92, American labor and civil rights activist and politician.
- Billie Moore, 79, American Hall of Fame basketball coach (Cal State Fullerton Titans, UCLA Bruins, 1976 Olympic women's team), multiple myeloma.
- Herbert Morris, 94, American philosopher.
- Mike Nish, 63, American racing driver.
- Haydée Padilla, 86, Argentine actress (Time for Revenge, The Deal, The Supporter).
- Sinnayah Sabapathy, 75, Malaysian Olympic sprinter (1972).
- Sir Sydney Samuelson, 97, British cinematographer.
- Cecil T. Sandifer, 99, American politician, member of the South Carolina House of Representatives (1972–1980).
- Frank J. Shakespeare, 97, American diplomat and media executive, ambassador to Portugal (1985–1986) and the Holy See (1987–1989).
- Georgi Stoilov, 93, Bulgarian architect and politician, MP (1966–1990), mayor of Sofia (1967–1971).
- Don L. Taylor, 91, Canadian politician, MP (1979–1980).
- Christopher Tucker, 81, British make-up artist (The Elephant Man, Quest for Fire, The Phantom of the Opera), strep infection.
- Salim al-Za'nun, 88, Palestinian politician, chairman of the PNC (since 1993).

=== 15 ===
- Luis Aguilar, 53, Mexican writer and poet.
- Karel Anthierens, 87, Belgian journalist (HUMO, Het Laatste Nieuws, Knack).
- Sulamita Aronovsky, 93, Soviet-born British classical pianist and teacher.
- Ken Balcomb, 82, American cetologist, prostate cancer.
- Istvan Banyai, 73, Hungarian illustrator and animator.
- Idrio Bui, 90, Italian racing cyclist.
- Dick Burrows, 81, Australian footballer (Richmond).
- Calpurnio, 63, Spanish comics artist and illustrator, cancer.
- Bernard Chabbert, 78, French writer and journalist.
- Renée Colliard, 89, Swiss alpine skier, Olympic champion (1956).
- Dino Danelli, 78, American Hall of Fame drummer (The Rascals), coronary artery disease and heart failure.
- Shirley Eikhard, 67, Canadian singer-songwriter ("Something to Talk About", "It Takes Time", "Smiling Wine").
- Sylvie Genty, 67, French writer and actress (Betty, Julie Lescaut, Navarro).
- Walter J. Husak, 80, American aerospace components manufacturer.
- Håkan Lindquist, 64, Swedish writer.
- Veronica Linklater, Baroness Linklater of Butterstone, 79, British politician, member of the House of Lords (1997–2016), complications from Alzheimer's disease.
- Liu Mingjiu, 88, Chinese translator.
- Shepherd Makunura, 46, Zimbabwean cricket player (Mashonaland A, Northerns) and coach.
- Vikramjeet Maurya, 63, Indian politician, Uttar Pradesh MLA (2017–2022), heart attack.
- Belinda Douglas-Scott-Montagu, Baroness Montagu of Beaulieu, 90, British embroiderer.
- James J. Murakami, 91, American art director and production designer (Deadwood, Changeling, Letters from Iwo Jima), Emmy winner (2005), complications from a fall.
- Jerôme Mvondo, 85–86, Cameroonian journalist and politician.
- Eliyahu Offer, 78, Israeli football player (Hapoel Be'er Sheva) and manager (Beitar Jerusalem, Maccabi Sha'arayim).
- Louis Orr, 64, American basketball player (Indiana Pacers, New York Knicks) and coach (Seton Hall Pirates), pancreatic cancer.
- Oqtay Radjabov, 81, Azerbaijani academic and composer.
- Michael Reed, 93, British cinematographer (The Gorgon, On Her Majesty's Secret Service, Galileo).
- Orlando Sanchez, 40, American martial artist, accidental drug overdose.
- Ademola Rasaq Seriki, 63, Nigerian politician, MP (1998–1999).
- Swami Shilananda, 97, Spanish Jesuit missionary.
- William G. Steiner, 85, American politician.
- Aki Takejō, 75, Japanese actress (The Ballad of Narayama), colon cancer.
- Endre Tihanyi, 77, Hungarian Olympic gymnast (1968).
- Joseph Torg, 88, American orthopedic surgeon.
- John Uelses, 85, American pole vaulter, complications from Alzheimer's disease.
- Barry West, 64, English snooker player.
- Zhao Zisen, 90, Chinese engineer and politician, member of the Chinese Academy of Engineering, deputy (1983–1998).

=== 16 ===
- Robert Adamson, 79, Australian poet and publisher.
- Elia Alessandrini, 25, Swiss footballer (Chiasso, Kriens, Stade Lausanne Ouchy), drowned.
- Huzihiro Araki, 90, Japanese mathematical physicist and mathematician (Wigner–Araki–Yanase theorem), co-founder of Reviews in Mathematical Physics.
- Henry Berg-Brousseau, 24, American transgender rights activist, suicide.
- Doreen Brownstone, 100, British-born Canadian actress (High Life, Foodland, Silent Night).
- Petre Constantin Buchwald, 85, Romanian politician, senator (1992–1996).
- Masud Choudhary, 78, Indian police officer and academic administrator, vice-chancellor of Baba Ghulam Shah Badshah University (2002–2007).
- Jean-Paul Corbineau, 74, French singer-songwriter (Tri Yann), leukemia.
- Barry Cullen, 87, Canadian ice hockey player (Toronto Maple Leafs, Detroit Red Wings, Buffalo Bisons).
- Peter Daly, 82, Irish Gaelic footballer (Ballinamere, Tullamore, Offaly).
- Paul De Keersmaeker, 93, Belgian politician, minister of agriculture (1981–1992), MP (1968–1995) and MEP (1979–1981).
- Daniela Giordano, 75, Italian actress (I See Naked, Have a Good Funeral, My Friend... Sartana Will Pay, Your Vice Is a Locked Room and Only I Have the Key).
- Burkhard Gladigow, 83, German scholar.
- Charlie Gracie, 86, American rock and roll singer ("Butterfly", "Fabulous"), complications from COVID-19.
- Hans Peter Hallwachs, 84, German actor (Degree of Murder, Fabian, Slap in the Face).
- Sue Hardesty, 89, American novelist, cancer.
- Jinks Holton, 97, American public servant, First Lady of Virginia (1970–1974).
- Elliott H. Levitas, 91, American politician, member of the U.S. House of Representatives (1975–1985) and the Georgia House of Representatives (1965–1975).
- Robin Ligus, 70, English serial killer.
- Bogdan Łysak, 86, Polish politician and economist, deputy (1976–1985), deputy president of the Supreme Audit Office (1989–1991).
- Klaus Mayer, 99, German Roman Catholic priest.
- Diana McIntosh, 90, Canadian composer and pianist.
- Denise Meunier, 104, French resistant.
- Siniša Mihajlović, 53, Serbian football player (Lazio, FR Yugoslavia national team) and manager (Bologna), leukaemia.
- Elizabeth Parrish, 97, American actress (The Edge of Night).
- Judy Reardon, 64, American politician.
- Mohammad Sadeq Rouhani, 96, Iranian Shia marja.
- Jane Sherwin, 88, British actress (Doctor Who, Blake's 7).
- Jose Maria Sison, 83, Filipino writer and political activist, founder of the Communist Party of the Philippines.
- Song Young-jin, 75, South Korean politician, MNA (1992–1996, 2000–2004).
- Tang Hongxiao, 91, Chinese engineer, member of the Chinese Academy of Engineering.
- Emil R. Unanue, 88, Cuban-American immunologist, glioblastoma.
- Edward Weldon, 86, American archivist and government administrator.

=== 17 ===
- Lawrence Costa, 52, Australian politician, Northern Territory MLA (since 2016).
- Eloy Fernández Clemente, 80, Spanish economist and historian.
- Steven Goldberg, 81, American anthropologist and sociologist.
- Drew Griffin, 60, American newscaster (CNN), cancer.
- Nicholas Herbert, 3rd Baron Hemingford, 88, British journalist (The Times, Cambridge Evening News), editor and peer, member of the House of Lords (1982–1999).
- Dieter Henrich, 95, German philosopher.
- Blanca Heredia, 88, Venezuelan beauty queen, Miss Venezuela winner (1956).
- Mike Hodges, 90, British screenwriter and director (Get Carter, Pulp, Flash Gordon).
- Wilbur Howard, 73, American baseball player (Houston Astros).
- Jacky Jakoba, 61, Curaçaoan-born Dutch Olympic baseball player.
- Elayne Jones, 94, American timpanist.
- Welton Jones, 86, American theatre critic, congestive heart failure.
- Elmar Kunauer, 82, Austrian Olympic sprinter (1960).
- Werner Leich, 95, German Protestant clergyman, bishop of the Evangelical Church in Thuringia (1978–1992).
- Liu Dalin, 90, Chinese sexologist.
- Archer Maclean, 60, British video game programmer (Dropzone, International Karate, Jimmy White's 'Whirlwind' Snooker).
- George M. Martin, 95, American biogerontologist.
- Maria Helena de Moura Neves, 91, Brazilian linguist, stroke.
- Manuel Muñoz, 94, Chilean footballer (Colo-Colo, national team).
- Anders Nyström, 89, Swedish actor (Gentleman with a Briefcase, Maria of Kvarngarden, Barnen från Frostmofjället).
- Soumanou Oke, 67, Beninese military officer.
- P-22, 12, American mountain lion, euthanized.
- Philip Pearlstein, 98, American painter.
- Nélida Piñon, 85, Brazilian-Spanish writer, president of the Academia Brasileira de Letras (1996–1997).
- Severino Poletto, 89, Italian Roman Catholic cardinal, bishop of Fossano (1980–1989) and Asti (1989–1999), archbishop of Turin (1999–2010).
- Clyde L. Reese, 64, American jurist, judge of the Georgia Court of Appeals (since 2016).
- Albert Reichmann, 93, Austrian-born Canadian real estate executive.
- Christian Saulsberry, 25, American football player (Edmonton Elks), shot.
- Marie-Luise Scherer, 84, German writer and journalist (Der Spiegel, Sinn und Form).
- Mario Sconcerti, 74, Italian sports journalist (Corriere dello Sport) and writer.
- Urmas Sisask, 62, Estonian composer.
- Ann Stephens, 89, New Zealand squash and badminton player.
- Eero Tapio, 81, Finnish Olympic wrestler (1964, 1968, 1972).
- Philippe Tillous-Borde, 76, French entrepreneur and engineer.
- Sunday Tuoyo, 84, Nigerian military officer and politician, governor of Ondo State (1978–1979).

=== 18 ===
- Lyudmila Agranovskaya, 90, Russian mountain climber.
- Hilda Augustovičová, 88, Slovak actress.
- Stephanie Bissonnette, 32, American dancer and choreographer (Mean Girls), medulloblastoma.
- Maurice Briand, 73, French lawyer and politician, deputy (1981–1986, 1988–1993), mayor of Guingamp (1983–1989).
- Steve Brooks, 72, American basketball player (Houston Rockets).
- Lando Buzzanca, 87, Italian actor (Divorce Italian Style, The Girl from Parma, Secret Fantasy), complications from a fall.
- Peter Darby, 84, Irish Gaelic footballer (Trim, Meath) and hurler.
- Martin Duffy, 55, English keyboardist (Felt, Primal Scream), complications from a fall.
- Maggie Eisner, 75, British general practitioner, glioblastoma.
- Janine Ghobert, 91, Belgian judge and politician, senator (1981–1991), MP (1991–1992).
- Juan Giaconi, 77, Chilean doctor and politician, minister of public health (1986–1990).
- Thea Gregory, 96, British actress (The Golden Link, The Weak and the Wicked, Satellite in the Sky).
- Hans Grosheide, 92, Dutch politician, MP (1971), state secretary for education (1963–1971) and justice (1971–1973).
- Terry Hall, 63, English singer (The Specials, Fun Boy Three) and songwriter ("Our Lips Are Sealed"), pancreatic cancer.
- Ivan Hamaliy, 66, Ukrainian football player (SKA Lviv/SKA Karpaty Lviv, FC Krystal Chortkiv) and manager.
- Chris Hartmire, 90, American Presbyterian minister abd civil rights activist.
- Wim Henderickx, 60, Belgian composer (Muziektheater Transparant) and teacher (Royal Conservatoire of Antwerp, Conservatorium van Amsterdam).
- Robert P. Higgins, 90, American systematic invertebrate zoologist and ecologist.
- Gavin Hunter, 81, British racehorse trainer.
- Nicholas Kehoe, 79, American lieutenant general, blood cancer.
- Rebecca Lorch, 32, American weightlifter, suicide.
- Don McKenney, 88, Canadian ice hockey player (Boston Bruins, New York Rangers) and coach (Northeastern Huskies).
- Manfred Messerschmidt, 96, German historian (Germany and the Second World War).
- Mikhail Moiseyev, 83, Russian military officer and politician, chief of the general staff (1988–1991).
- Greetje den Ouden-Dekkers, 82, Dutch politician, MP (1982–1986).
- Ken Pears, 88, Canadian soccer player (Vancouver Firefighters FC, Westminster Royals, national team).
- Emilio Pegoraro, 101, Italian partisan and politician, senator (1968–1972, 1976–1979) and deputy (1972–1976).
- Petro Pylypchuk, 75, Ukrainian judge, chairman of the Supreme Court (2011–2013).
- Galust Sahakyan, 73, Armenian politician, member (1995–2018) and president (2014–2017) of the National Assembly.
- Laith Shubeilat, 80, Jordanian politician, MP (1984–1993), heart attack.
- Carol Teichrob, 83, Canadian politician, Saskatchewan MLA (1991–1999).
- Maggie Thrett, 76, American actress (The Devil's Brigade, Three in the Attic, Star Trek).
- Rosalba Todaro, Chilean economist.
- Ladislav Trojan, 90, Czech actor (Silvery Wind, High Blue Wall, Forbidden Dreams).
- Gavin Weightman, 77, British journalist (New Society) and documentary filmmaker.
- Xi Xi, 85, Hong Kong novelist and poet, heart failure.

=== 19 ===
- H. Norman Abramson, 96, American engineer and scientist.
- Ali Ahmed Aslam, 77, Pakistani-born Scottish chef and restaurateur, credited with inventing chicken tikka masala, septic shock and organ failure.
- Henriette Bernier, 85, French novelist.
- Jonas Algimantas Boruta, 78, Lithuanian Roman Catholic prelate, auxiliary bishop of Vilnius (1997–2002) and bishop of Telšiai (2002–2017).
- Gerald Brennan, 84, Australian rules footballer (South Melbourne).
- Max Brito, 54, Ivorian rugby union player (national team).
- Tom Browning, 62, American baseball player (Cincinnati Reds, Kansas City Royals), World Series champion (1990).
- Claudisabel, 46, Portuguese singer, traffic collision.
- Luc De Schepper, 65, Belgian physicist and academic administrator, rector of Hasselt University (2014–2020).
- Stanley Drucker, 93, American clarinetist.
- Mircea Dușa, 67, Romanian politician, minister of national defence (2012–2015), cancer.
- Sonya Eddy, 55, American actress (General Hospital, Those Who Can't, Barbershop), infection after surgery.
- Sandy Edmonds, 74, British-born New Zealand pop singer.
- Erwin Josef Ender, 85, German Roman Catholic prelate, apostolic nuncio to Estonia (1997–2001) and the Czech Republic (2001–2003), apostolic delegate to Somalia (1990–1997).
- Khalaf Al-Enezi, 76, Kuwaiti politician, MP (1981–2016).
- Iraj Etesam, 91, Iranian architect.
- Valentina Firsova, 85, Russian Soviet politician, people's deputy (1974–1979).
- Joseph Gao Hongxiao, 77, Chinese Roman Catholic prelate, coadjutor bishop (2005–2007) and bishop (since 2007) of Kaifeng.
- Encarna Hernández, 105, Spanish basketball player and coach.
- Gary Knafelc, 90, American football player (Green Bay Packers, San Francisco 49ers, Chicago Cardinals), NFL champion (1961, 1962).
- Jamila Ksiksi, 54, Tunisian politician, MP (2014–2021), traffic collision.
- Gilbert Lascault, 88, French writer and art critic.
- Per-Ola Lindberg, 82, Swedish Olympic swimmer (1960, 1964).
- Aonghas MacNeacail, 80, Scottish Gaelic writer.
- Iván Mesías, 87, Chilean businessman and politician, deputy (1998–2002).
- Yasuo Minagawa, 75, Japanese baseball player (Hokkaido Nippon-Ham Fighters, Hiroshima Toyo Carp).
- Charlie Monk, 84, American music executive and broadcaster.
- Graham Oakley, 93, English children's author (The Church Mice).
- Ladislav Pazdera, 86, Czech Olympic gymnast (1960, 1964).
- Jason Pearson, 52, American comic book artist and writer (Body Bags).
- Gerry Perry, 92, American football player (Detroit Lions, St. Louis Cardinals).
- Alexandr Rodin, 75, Belarusian contemporary painter.
- Al Smith, 75, American basketball player (Denver Rockets, Utah Stars), suicide by gunshot.
- Steve Smoger, 72, American Hall of Fame boxing referee.
- Andrei Svislotski, 62, Russian animator (Curious George, Aaahh!!! Real Monsters, Rugrats).
- Herman Timme, 89, Dutch Olympic decathlete (1960).
- Anthony Whetstone, 95, British naval admiral.
- Salam al-Zaubai, 63, Iraqi politician, MP (2005–2010).

=== 20 ===
- Nasser Abu Hamid, 50, Palestinian prisoner (al-Aqsa Martyrs' Brigades), lung cancer.
- Mykola Berezutskiy, 85, Ukrainian Olympic hurdler.
- Charles Edwin Brown, 86, American football player (Oakland Raiders).
- Oleh Bobalo, 44, Ukrainian director and soldier, shot.
- Chia Boon Leong, 97, Singaporean-Chinese Olympic footballer (1948).
- Barry Brown, 88, American Olympic volleyball player.
- Denny Doyle, 78, American baseball player (Philadelphia Phillies, Boston Red Sox, California Angels).
- Ronald Feldman, 84, American art dealer.
- Sir Robert Gerken, 90, British naval admiral.
- Franco Harris, 72, American Hall of Fame football player (Pittsburgh Steelers, Seattle Seahawks), four-time Super Bowl champion.
- Ray Herbert, 93, American baseball player (Kansas City Athletics, Chicago White Sox), complications from Alzheimer's disease.
- Brian Horlock, 91, English Anglican priest, dean of Gibraltar (1989–1998).
- James R. Houghton, 86, American business executive.
- Lech Kuropatwiński, 75, Polish politician and entrepreneur, deputy (2001–2007).
- Vladimír Krčméry, 62, Slovak physician, pneumonia.
- Taisto Laitinen, 89, Finnish Olympic pole vaulter.
- Zoran Lakić, 89, Montenegrin historian, member of the Montenegrin Academy of Sciences and Arts.
- Solomon Lee, 86, Hong Kong Olympic sport shooter (1976, 1984).
- Barbara Noack, 98, German writer.
- Paul Ormonde, 91, Australian journalist.
- Laura Podestà, 68, Italian Olympic swimmer (1972).
- John M. Radosevich, 92, American politician.
- Quinn Redeker, 86, American actor (Days of Our Lives, The Young and the Restless) and screenwriter (The Deer Hunter).
- Renny Roker, 80, American actor (Deliver Us From Evil, Gomer Pyle – USMC, Hill Street Blues).
- Luigi Stucchi, 81, Italian Roman Catholic prelate, auxiliary bishop of Milan (2004–2020).
- Subroto, 99, Indonesian administrator and economist, secretary general of OPEC (1984–1985, 1988–1994).
- Brenda Swinbank, 93, British archaeologist.
- Toru Takahashi, 81, Japanese computer scientist.
- Dejan Tiago-Stanković, 57, Serbian-Portuguese writer and translator.
- Tadeusz Werno, 91, Polish Roman Catholic prelate, auxiliary bishop of Koszalin-Kołobrzeg (1974–2007).
- Maya Widmaier-Picasso, 87, French art curator, pulmonary complications.
- Zhu Zhihong, 89, Chinese politician, CPPCC chairman of Jiangxi (1994–2003).

=== 21 ===
- Alberto Asor Rosa, 89, Italian literary critic, historian, and politician, deputy (1979–1980), cardiac arrest.
- Amangeldy Aytaly, 83, Kazakh academic and politician, MP (1999–2007).
- Doug Baker, 93, English rugby union player (Barbarian F.C., British & Irish Lions, national team).
- Tony Barry, 81, Australian actor (Australia, Goodbye Pork Pie, The Time of Our Lives), melanoma.
- John Berchmans Conway, 93, Irish Roman Catholic religious sister.
- Aminah Cendrakasih, 84, Indonesian actress (Si Doel Anak Sekolahan, Tjambuk Api, Mustika Ibu).
- Christopher Dowling, 78, Maltese Olympic swimmer (1960).
- Franz Gertsch, 92, Swiss painter.
- Gordy Giovanelli, 97, American rower, Olympic champion (1948).
- Ron Hein, 73, American politician, member of the Kansas Senate (1977–1985) and House of Representatives (1975–1977).
- Ronnie Hillman, 31, American football player (Denver Broncos, Minnesota Vikings, San Diego Chargers), Super Bowl champion (2016), complications from renal medullary carcinoma.
- Roger Jenkins, 91, British theatre and television director.
- H. R. Keshava Murthy, 88, Indian gamaka artist.
- Bilqees Khanum, 73, Pakistani classical singer.
- Noreen Kokoruda, 75, American politician, member of the Connecticut House of Representatives (2011–2021).
- Lajos Koutny, 83, Hungarian Olympic ice hockey player (1964).
- Frank I. Marcus, 94, American cardiologist.
- Diane McBain, 81, American actress (Spinout, Surfside 6, Batman), liver cancer.
- Milan, 24, British Thoroughbred racehorse.
- Éric Molinié, 62, French businessman.
- Mixie Palmer, 95, Irish Gaelic footballer (Killarney Legion, Kerry).
- Gary Ridley, 77, American engineer and politician, Oklahoma secretary of transportation (2009–2017).
- R. L. Shep, 89, American artist and writer.
- Nancy Guttmann Slack, 92, American plant ecologist.
- Ludwik Synowiec, 64, Polish Olympic ice hockey player (1980, 1984).
- György Tumpek, 93, Hungarian swimmer, Olympic bronze medallist (1956).
- Shigeru Uchida, 83, Japanese politician, chairman of the Tokyo Metropolitan Assembly (2003–2005).
- Zhang Guocheng, 91, Chinese engineer, member of the Chinese Academy of Engineering.
- Simon Yaxley, 53, British radio broadcaster and actor.
- Zhao Yijun, 92, Chinese engineer, member of the Chinese Academy of Engineering.

=== 22 ===
- Thom Bell, 79, Jamaican-born American songwriter ("The Rubberband Man", "La-La (Means I Love You)", "Mama Can't Buy You Love"), arranger and record producer.
- Big Scarr, 22, American rapper, drug overdose.
- Stephan Bonnar, 45, American mixed martial artist (UFC) and professional wrestler (Impact Wrestling), fentanyl overdose.
- William Dimma, 94, Canadian academic and business executive.
- John Moffat Fugui, 61, Solomon Islands politician, MP (since 2010), cardiac arrest.
- Odd-Bjørn Fure, 80, Norwegian historian and political scientist.
- Gu Zhen'an, 86, Chinese engineer, member of the Chinese Academy of Engineering.
- Gui Yufang, 92, Chinese translator.
- Alikram Hummatov, 74, Azerbaijani political activist, president of the Talysh-Mughan Autonomous Republic (1993).
- Concha Ibáñez, 93, Spanish painter and writer.
- Ze'ev Iviansky, 99, Israeli political scientist.
- Ronnie Lamont, 81, Irish rugby union player (British & Irish Lions, Ireland national team).
- Long Yuqiu, 96, Chinese engineer and academic, member of the Chinese Academy of Engineering.
- Heidy Mader, 61, British physicist, cancer.
- Joyce Meskis, 80, American bookseller.
- Maria Nowak, 87, Polish economist.
- Burton Pike, 92, American translator.
- Julieta Pinto, 101, Costa Rican educator and writer.
- Ron Richmond, 81, American politician, member of the Florida House of Representatives (1972–1984).
- James Rosecrans, 69, American football player (New York Jets).
- Victor Scherrer, 79, Belgian-born French industrialist, art collector, and essayist.
- Abbas Sheibani, 91, Iranian politician, member of the City Council of Tehran (2003–2017) and MP (1981–2000).
- Mukta Tilak, 57, Indian politician, Maharashtra MLA (since 2019), cancer.
- Anton Tkáč, 71, Slovak racing cyclist, Olympic champion (1976).
- Ronan Vibert, 58, British actor (Saving Mr. Banks, The Scarlet Pimpernel, The Pianist).
- Walter "Wolfman" Washington, 79, American blues singer and guitarist, cancer.
- James Kinnier Wilson, 101, British Assyriologist.
- Ken Wilson, 70, Australian rugby league player (Newtown, Penrith), cancer.

=== 23 ===
- Su'ad al-Fatih al-Badawi, 90, Sudanese politician, MP (1996–2005).
- Karnendu Bhattacharjee, 84, Indian politician, MP (1996–2008) and Assam MLA (1985–1991).
- George Cohen, 83, English footballer (Fulham, national team), world champion (1966).
- Cue Card, 16, British Thoroughbred racehorse, heart attack.
- David Dalton, 88, American violist and author.
- Cotton Davidson, 91, American football player (Baltimore Colts, Dallas Texans, Oakland Raiders).
- Jean-Robert de Cavel, 61, French-American chef, leiomyosarcoma.
- Trevor Fancutt, 88, South African tennis player.
- József Fitos, 63, Hungarian football player (Szombathelyi Haladás, national team) and manager (Budapest Honvéd).
- Odette Roy Fombrun, 105, Haitian writer and intellectual.
- Spyridon Galinos, 70, Greek politician, mayor of Lesbos (2014–2018) and MP (2009–2012), cancer.
- Stephen Greif, 78, British actor (Blake's 7, Casanova, Nicholas and Alexandra).
- Jiang Hualiang, 57, Chinese pharmaceutical scientist, member of the Chinese Academy of Sciences.
- Colin Jillings, 91, New Zealand Hall of Fame horse trainer.
- Emine Kara, 47–48, Turkish Kurdish militant and activist, shot.
- John Kinch, 68, Canadian football player (Hamilton Tiger-Cats, Toronto Argonauts, Saskatchewan Roughriders), cancer.
- Marion W. La Follette, 96, American politician.
- Li Wenhua, 90, Chinese ecologist, member of the Chinese Academy of Engineering.
- Lu Qiang, 86, Chinese engineer, member of the Chinese Academy of Engineering.
- Ma Jianzhang, 85, Chinese zoologist, member of the Chinese Academy of Engineering.
- Madosini, 78, South African musician.
- Michael Marrus, 81, Canadian historian.
- Maxi Jazz, 65, English musician (Faithless) and songwriter ("Insomnia", "God Is a DJ").
- Jorge Maya, 78, Uruguayan Olympic basketball player.
- Claire McLintock, 57, Scottish-born New Zealand haematologist and obstetric physician.
- Brandon Montrell, 43, American TikTok personality and comedian.
- Christopher Needler, 78, British businessman, chairman of Hull City A.F.C. (1975–1997).
- Sir Ashok Rabheru, 70, Tanzanian-born British businessman.
- Txetxu Rojo, 75, Spanish football player (Athletic Bilbao, national team) and manager (Salamanca).
- Jerry Roth, 81, American boxing judge.
- Kaikala Satyanarayana, 87, Indian actor (Kodama Simham, Bangaru Kutumbam) and politician, MP (1996–1998).
- Massimo Savić, 60, Croatian singer (Dorian Gray), lung cancer.
- Genaro Sermeño, 74, Salvadoran football player (FAS, national team) and manager (Juventud Olímpica), complications from diabetes.
- Willie Sims, 64, American-Israeli basketball player (Hapoel Tel Aviv, Elitzur Netanya, Maccabi Tel Aviv), complications from a heart attack.
- Philippe Streiff, 67, French racing driver.
- Germán Tena Orozco, 89, Mexican businessman and politician, deputy (1985–1988).
- Ella Tengbom-Velander, 101, Swedish politician, municipal commissioner of Helsingborg (1977–1982, 1986–1988).
- Lutz Ulbricht, 80, German rower, Olympic champion (1968).
- Ed Updegraff, 100, American golfer and urologist.
- Mark Warkentien, 69, American basketball executive (Denver Nuggets).
- Michael Wertheimer, 95, German-born American psychologist, complications from a fall.
- Zhang Youshang, 97, Chinese biochemist, member of the Chinese Academy of Sciences.

=== 24 ===
- Vittorio Adorni, 85, Italian road racing cyclist, Giro d'Italia winner (1965).
- William C. Agee, 86, American art curator.
- William Anthony, 88, American painter, injuries sustained in house fire.
- Pavel Antov, 65, Russian businessman and politician, deputy (since 2018), fall from a hotel window.
- V. K. Bali, 77, Indian jurist, judge of the Punjab and Haryana (1991–2005) and Rajasthan (2005–2006) high courts, chief justice of the Kerala High Court (2006–2007).
- Elena Gianini Belotti, 93, Italian writer, teacher, and activist.
- John Bird, 86, English actor (Red, White and Zero, A Dandy in Aspic) and comedian (Not So Much a Programme, More a Way of Life), stroke complications.
- Ray Boughen, 85, Canadian politician, MP (2008–2015).
- Kenton Edelin, 60, American basketball player (Indiana Pacers).
- John Eldridge, 86, British sociologist, president of the British Sociological Association (1979–1981).
- Franco Frattini, 65, Italian politician and magistrate, twice minister of foreign affairs, twice of public administration, European commissioner for justice (2004–2008), cancer.
- Don Gorton, 62, American lawyer and tax judge.
- Colleen House, 70, American politician, member of the Michigan House of Representatives (1974–1976, 1983–1986).
- Demetrious Johnson, 61, American football player (Detroit Lions, Miami Dolphins).
- Franjo Jurjević, 90, Croatian Olympic gymnast (1952).
- Edie Landau, 95, American film and television producer (Hopscotch, The Chosen, The Christmas Wife) and executive.
- Jean Paré, 95, Canadian caterer and cookbook author (Company's Coming).
- Andrzej Pstrokoński, 86, Polish Olympic basketball player (1960, 1964).
- Chalapathi Rao, 78, Indian actor (Mother India, Super Police, Alluda Majaka), heart attack.
- Martin Ravallion, 70, Australian economist.
- Mario Rosa, 90, Italian historian.
- Freddie Roulette, 83, American blues guitarist and singer, complications from dementia.
- Barry Round, 72, Australian footballer (Sydney, Footscray, Williamstown), organ failure.
- Royal Applause, 29, British Thoroughbred racehorse and sire.
- John Howard Sanden, 87, American portrait artist.
- Keith Sanderson, 82, English footballer (Plymouth Argyle, Queens Park Rangers, Wimbledon), traffic collision.
- Tunisha Sharma, 20, Indian actress (Bharat Ka Veer Putra – Maharana Pratap, Chakravartin Ashoka Samrat, Ishq Subhan Allah), suicide by hanging.
- Tom Stacey, 92, British novelist, publisher, and journalist, pneumonia.
- Larry Starcher, 80, American jurist, member of the Supreme Court of Appeals of West Virginia (1997–2008).
- Bill Uhl, 89, American basketball player.
- Irène K:son Ullberg, 92, Swedish painter.
- Kathy Whitworth, 83, American Hall of Fame professional golfer.
- Zhang Jinzhe, 102, Chinese paediatric surgeon, member of the Chinese Academy of Engineering.

=== 25 ===
- Sir Michael Armitage, 92, British air force commander.
- Camilo Azuquita, 76, Panamanian singer and composer.
- Mira Bellwether, 40, American sex educator and writer (Fucking Trans Women), complications from lung cancer.
- Trevor Bidstrup, 84, Australian cricketer.
- Jean Blondel, 93, French political scientist.
- Françoise Bourdin, 70, French novelist.
- Godfrey Bradman, 86, British property developer.
- Pierre Brocheux, 91, Vietnamese-French historian.
- Brian Cassar, 86, British rock and roll singer and guitarist.
- Daniel E. Cassell, 56, Liberian psychologist and politician.
- Cho Se-hui, 80, South Korean writer, complications from COVID-19.
- Claudio Donelli, 94, Italian politician, deputy (1972–1976), senator (1976–1979).
- Haim Drukman, 90, Polish-born Israeli Orthodox rabbi and politician, MK (1977–1983, 1999–2003), complications from COVID-19.
- Paul Fox, 68, American record producer (Phish, XTC, They Might Be Giants), complications from Alzheimer's Disease.
- Michael Fuchs, 73, German politician, MP (2002–2017).
- Claire Gagnier, 98, Canadian singer.
- Micheline Gary, 97, French actress.
- Joop Glimmerveen, 94, Dutch political activist.
- Luc Marius Ibriga, 66, Ivorian-born Burkinabé academic and jurist.
- Luther "Guitar Junior" Johnson, 83, American blues musician.
- John Leddy, 92, Dutch actor (Zeg 'ns Aaa).
- Wellington Lee, 97, Australian pharmacist and politician, deputy lord mayor of Melbourne (1999–2000).
- Abraham Levy, 83, English Orthodox rabbi.
- Li Ziliu, 90, Chinese politician, mayor of Guangzhou (1990–1996), COVID-19.
- Bogusław Litwiniec, 91, Polish theatre director and politician, senator (2001–2005) and MEP (2004).
- Rodney Loudon, 88, British physicist.
- Alice Mahon, 85, British politician, MP (1987–2005).
- Alexey Maslov, 69, Russian military officer, commander-in-chief of the Russian Ground Forces (2004–2008).
- John H. McBryde, 91, American jurist, judge of the U.S. District Court for Northern Texas (since 1990).
- Evgeny Moiseev, 74, Russian mathematician, member of the Russian Academy of Sciences.
- Yuji Nunokawa, 75, Japanese animator, founder of Pierrot.
- Fabián O'Neill, 49, Uruguayan footballer (Cagliari, Juventus, national team), complications from liver disease.
- Kevin Payne, 69, American soccer executive (D.C. United, Toronto FC, United States Soccer Federation).
- Ridwan Saidi, 80, Indonesian politician, member of the People's Representative Council (1977–1987).
- Simon Sargon, 84, American composer.
- K. P. Sasi, 64, Indian film director (Ilayum Mullum, Ek Alag Mausam).
- Ken Sidwell, 86, American college basketball (Tennessee Tech Golden Eagles) and baseball coach (Belmont).
- Henryk Szordykowski, 78, Polish Olympic runner (1968, 1972).
- Tong Tanjun, 88, Chinese oncologist, member of the Chinese Academy of Sciences, fall.
- Rita Walter, 71, American actress (As the World Turns, The Secret Storm).
- Wang Wenjiao, 89, Chinese badminton player and coach (national team).
- Wang Zhongqi, 90, Chinese engineer, member of the Chinese Academy of Engineering.
- Kyōji Watanabe, 92, Japanese historian.
- Wu Chengkang, 93, Chinese engineer, member of the Chinese Academy of Sciences.

=== 26 ===
- Ronald E. Asher, 96, British linguist and educator.
- Hazel Beard, 92, American politician, mayor of Shreveport, Louisiana (1990–1994).
- Alain Bernheim, 91, French classical pianist.
- Penda Dallé, 64, Cameroonian artist and musician.
- Tom Danby, 96, English rugby union (Harlequins) and league player (Salford, national team).
- Stephen Allen Davis, 73, American songwriter ("Stand Beside Me").
- Sergey Dmitriyev, 58, Russian football player (Zenit Leningrad, Soviet Union national team) and manager (Dynamo Saint Petersburg).
- António Mega Ferreira, 73, Portuguese writer and journalist.
- Blasco Giurato, 81, Italian cinematographer (Cinema Paradiso, A Pure Formality, The Game Bag).
- Guan Qiao, 87, Chinese engineer and politician, member of the Chinese Academy of Engineering, deputy (1983–1988).
- Guan Zhaoye, 93, Chinese architect, member of the Chinese Academy of Engineering.
- Dorothy Iannone, 89, American visual artist.
- Cosimo Izzo, 79, Italian lawyer and politician, senator (2001–2013).
- Bojan Jamina, 43, Bosnian footballer (OFK Beograd, Slavija Sarajevo, Čelik Zenica).
- Konrad Kruis, 92, German lawyer, judge of the Federal Constitutional Court (1987–1998).
- Victoria Lee, 18, American mixed martial artist, suicide.
- Li Qingzhong, 92, Chinese engineer, member of the Chinese Academy of Engineering.
- Si Litvinoff, 93, American film producer (Walkabout, The Queen, A Clockwork Orange) and lawyer.
- Lasse Lönndahl, 94, Swedish singer and actor (Swinging at the Castle).
- Thomas Meaney, 92, Irish politician, TD (1965–1982).
- No Kum-sok, 90, North Korean pilot and defector.
- George Obiozor, 80, Nigerian professor and diplomat.
- Ghulam Dastagir Panjsheri, 89, Afghan politician.
- Munira al-Qubaysi, 89, Syrian Islamic scholar, founder of Al-Qubaysiat.
- Christian Roberts, 78, British actor (To Sir, with Love, The Anniversary, The Mind of Mr. Soames), cancer.
- Nicola Signorello, 96, Italian politician, senator (1968–1985), mayor of Rome (1985–1988) and twice minister of tourism.
- Fred Valentine, 87, American baseball player (Baltimore Orioles, Washington Senators).
- Gio Wiederhold, 86, Italian-born American computer scientist.

=== 27 ===
- Kenneth Bagshawe, 97, British oncologist.
- Dominique Bentejac, 78, French Olympic equestrian (1972, 1976).
- Pat Briggs, 58, American musician (Psychotica).
- Simon Clarke, 76, British sociologist.
- Brian Davies, 87, British animal welfare activist, founder of the International Fund for Animal Welfare.
- René Deleris, 96, French rugby union player.
- Arnie Ferrin, 97, American basketball player (Utah Utes, Minneapolis Lakers).
- Alfred Goodwin, 99, American jurist, judge (since 1971) and chief judge (1988–1991) of the U.S. Court of Appeals for the Ninth Circuit, judge of the U.S. District Court for Oregon (1969–1971).
- John Grazier, 76, American realist artist.
- Timo Grönlund, 68, Finnish four-time Olympic sprint canoer, traffic collision.
- Thad Heartfield, 82, American jurist, judge (since 1995) and chief judge (2003–2009) of the U.S. District Court for Eastern Texas.
- Andrzej Iwan, 63, Polish footballer (Wisła Kraków, Górnik Zabrze, national team).
- Howard John Lloyd, 92, Canadian politician.
- Jo Mersa Marley, 31, Jamaican-American musician, asthma attack.
- Rodolfo Micheli, 92, Argentine footballer (Independiente, Millonarios, national team), kidney failure.
- André Miquel, 93, French Arabist and historian.
- Gerald Moore, 98, British scholar of poetry.
- Ambler H. Moss, 86, American diplomat.
- Stewart Albert Newblatt, 95, American jurist, judge of the U.S. District Court for Eastern Michigan (since 1979).
- George J. O'Shea Jr., 93, American politician, member of the Massachusetts House of Representatives (1957–1963).
- Herbert Permillion, 79, American typewriter repairman.
- Marios Philippides, 72, Greek-born American historian, injuries sustained in traffic collision.
- Maximilien Polak, 92, Canadian jurist and politician, Quebec MNA (1981–1989).
- Dave Richardson, 82, Canadian ice hockey player (New York Rangers, Chicago Blackhawks, Detroit Red Wings).
- Rohan Robertson, 61, Australian footballer (North Melbourne).
- Cervin Robinson, 94, American photographer and author.
- Peter Roussel, 81, American political consultant, cancer.
- Luann Ryon, 69, American archer, Olympic champion (1976).
- Giorgio Salmoiraghi, 86, Italian painter.
- Harry Sheppard, 94, American jazz vibraphonist.
- Imre Szöllősi, 81, Hungarian sprint canoeist, double Olympic silver medallist (1960).
- Tibor Viniczai, 66, Hungarian agricultural engineer and politician, mayor of Székesfehérvár (2010).
- Ray Young, 88, English footballer (Derby County, Heanor Town, Burton Albion).

=== 28 ===
- Draga Ahačič, 98, Slovenian actress, film director and translator.
- Sir Leonard Allinson, 96, British civil servant and diplomat.
- Cliff Arnebeck, 77, American lawyer.
- Bernard Barsi, 80, French Roman Catholic prelate, archbishop of Monaco (2000–2020), heart attack.
- Félix Alberto Beltrán Concepción, 84, Cuban graphic designer and engraver.
- Italo Bettiol, 96, Italian-French film director (Chapi Chapo).
- Black Stalin, 81, Trinidadian calypso musician.
- Thomas B. Bruton, 92, American major general.
- Alan Copeland, 96, American vocal conductor (The Modernaires) and singer.
- Jess E. DuBois, 88, American artist.
- Dick Flavin, 86, American poet.
- Akira Fujii, 81, Japanese astronomer.
- Abdul Hamid, 74, Indonesian voice actor (Si Unyil).
- Arata Isozaki, 91, Japanese architect (Kitakyushu Municipal Museum of Art, MOCA, Nagi Museum Of Contemporary Art) and urban planner, Pritzker Prize winner (2019).
- František Jursa, 89, Czech Olympic cyclist (1956).
- Derrick Knight, 93, British film director and producer.
- Volodymyr Kvurt, 55, Ukrainian entrepreneur and politician, member of the Lviv Oblast Council (since 2020).
- Li Tianchu, 77, Chinese metrologist and academic, member of the Chinese Academy of Engineering.
- Bennett McCallum, 87, American monetary economist (McCallum rule).
- Jaishankar Menon, 66, Indian-American computer scientist, stroke.
- Avrion Mitchison, 94, British zoologist and immunologist.
- Harold Loyd Murphy, 95, American jurist, judge of the U.S. District Court for Northern Georgia (since 1977).
- Vladimir Nesterov, 73, Russian engineer, director of Khrunichev State Research and Production Space Center (since 2005).
- Germain Anouman Ollo, 71, Ivorian businessman and politician, vice-president of the Senate (since 2018).
- Valda Osborn, 88, British Olympic figure skater (1952).
- Sun Jingliang, 92, Chinese rocket engineer and academic, member of the Chinese Academy of Engineering.
- Linda de Suza, 74, Portuguese singer, COVID-19.
- Joan Sydney, 83, British-born Australian actress (A Country Practice, E Street, Neighbours).
- Tony Vaccaro, 100, American photographer.
- Sribhashyam Vijayasarathi, 86, Indian writer, Sanskrit grammarian, and literary critic.
- Stefan Wever, 64, German-born American baseball player (New York Yankees).

=== 29 ===
- Eduard Artemyev, 85, Russian composer (At Home Among Strangers, Solaris, Burnt by the Sun), People's Artist of Russia (1999), complications from pneumonia.
- Pierre Bouladou, 97, French Olympic weightlifter (1948).
- John Burnett, 87, English rugby league player (Halifax).
- Keenan Cahill, 27, American internet celebrity, complications from heart surgery.
- Miroslav Číž, 68, Slovak politician, MEP (since 2019) and MP (2002–2019).
- Dave Davis, 80, American ten-pin bowler.
- Noël Dejonckheere, 67, Belgian road racing cyclist.
- Ruggero Deodato, 83, Italian film director (Cannibal Holocaust, Ultimo mondo cannibale, Live Like a Cop, Die Like a Man), screenwriter and actor.
- Margriet Eshuijs, 70, Dutch singer.
- Gerry Gravelle, 88, Canadian Olympic ski jumper (1960).
- Gerold Grodsky, 95, American biochemist.
- John Jackson, 80, English footballer (Crystal Palace, Leyton Orient, Millwall).
- Catherine Kasavuli, 60, Kenyan news presenter (KBC, Citizen TV, KTN), cervical cancer.
- Mihalj Kertes, 75, Serbian politician, minister without portfolio (1993–1994).
- Maximilian, Margrave of Baden, 89, German aristocrat, head of the house of Baden (since 1963).
- Marion Meade, 88, American biographer and novelist.
- Norman A. Mordue, 80, American jurist, judge (since 1998) and chief judge (2006–2011) of the U.S. District Court for Northern New York.
- Jackie Overfield, 90, English footballer (Leeds United, Sunderland, Bradford City).
- Pelé, 82, Brazilian footballer (Santos, national team), world champion (1958, 1962, 1970), multiple organ failure as complications from colon cancer.
- Prakash Poddar, 82, Indian cricketer (Bengal, Rajasthan).
- Rebecca Pratt, 55, American radio presenter.
- Shabana Rehman Gaarder, 46, Pakistani-born Norwegian stand-up comedian and columnist, pancreatic cancer.
- Mikko Saarinen, 76, Finnish Olympic boxer (1972).
- Subrata Saha, 69, Indian politician, West Bengal MLA (since 2011), complications from gallbladder surgery.
- Edgar Savisaar, 72, Estonian politician, prime minister of the interim government (1991–1992), minister of the interior (1995) and twice mayor of Tallinn.
- Jaysin Strife, 37, American professional wrestler.
- Dany Theis, 55, Luxembourgish football player (Union Luxembourg, national team) and manager (Jeunesse Esch), complications from a heart attack and a fall.
- Joseph Ti Kang, 94, Taiwanese Roman Catholic prelate, archbishop of Taipei (1989–2004), cerebral hemorrhage.
- Ian Tyson, 89, Canadian singer (Ian & Sylvia) and songwriter ("Four Strong Winds", "Someday Soon").
- Harry L. Van Trees, 92, American scientist.
- János Varga, 83, Hungarian wrestler, Olympic champion (1968).
- Edward Weidenfeld, 79, American lawyer.
- Dame Vivienne Westwood, 81, British fashion designer.

=== 30 ===
- Sinan Ateş, 38, Turkish historian and politician, chairman of the Grey Wolves (2019–2020), shot.
- Vladimer Barkaia, 85, Georgian footballer (Dinamo Tbilisi, Soviet Union national team).
- Lino Benech, 75, Uruguayan Olympic cyclist.
- Graham Boal, 79, British judge and author, throat cancer.
- Peter G. Callas, 96, American politician, member of the Maryland House of Delegates (1983–1994).
- Włodzimierz Danek, 79, Polish Olympic sport shooter (1968).
- Sir John Dellow, 91, British police officer.
- Robert Dowling, 83, American magazine publisher (The Hollywood Reporter), cancer.
- Miklós Duray, 77, Slovak politician, Hungarian minority political representative in Slovakia, MP (1992–2010).
- Bob Fesh, 85, American politician.
- Willard Gaylin, 97, American bioethicist and physician, co-founder of the Hastings Center.
- Brian Glencross, 81, Australian Olympic field hockey player, bronze medallist (1964), silver medallist (1968) and coach.
- Rex Hartwig, 93, Australian tennis player.
- James Henderson Jr., 80, American politician, member of the Arizona Senate (1985–1999).
- Maurice Horn, 91, French-American comics historian and author.
- Tonya Ingram, 31, American poet, author and disability activist.
- Jian Xianfo, 107, Chinese revolutionary, lung infection.
- Raymond Lalonde, 82, American politician, member of the Louisiana House of Representatives (1980–1996).
- Li Jing, 92, Chinese military officer, commander of PLANAF (1983–1990).
- Richard J. Macy, 92, American jurist, chief justice of the Wyoming Supreme Court (1993–1995).
- Uche Nwaneri, 38, American football player (Jacksonville Jaguars).
- Terence O'Brien, 86, English-born New Zealand diplomat, ambassador to Belgium (1983–1986).
- Johnny Powers, 79, Canadian professional wrestler.
- Bruce Roberts, 80, American Hall of Fame curler, world champion (1976).
- Jerry Siebert, 84, American Olympic runner (1960, 1964).
- Eric Thomas, 49, American Olympic hurdler (2000).
- Shmuel Toledano, 101, Israeli intelligence officer and politician, MK (1977–1981).
- Barbara Walters, 93, American Hall of Fame television journalist (Today, 20/20) and talk show host (The View).
- John Quinn Weitzel, 94, American Roman Catholic prelate, bishop of Samoa-Pago Pago (1986–2013).
- Don West, 59, American commentator (Impact Wrestling) and pitchman (Shop at Home Network), lymphoma.
- Don Williams, 100, American traditional pop singer (The Williams Brothers).
- Janez Zemljarič, 94, Slovenian politician, prime minister of the Socialist Republic (1980–1984).

=== 31 ===
- Sergei Bautin, 55, Russian ice hockey player (Winnipeg Jets, Detroit Red Wings, San Jose Sharks), Olympic champion (1992).
- Pope Benedict XVI, 95, German Roman Catholic prelate and theologian (Introduction to Christianity), pope (2005–2013), archbishop of Munich and Freising (1977–1982), cardiogenic shock from respiratory failure.
- Mohamed Cherkaoui, 101, Moroccan politician, minister of foreign affairs (1966–1967).
- Ginny Redington Dawes, 77, American songwriter, complications from cirrhosis.
- Brenda Dervin, 84, American mathematician.
- Barnabás Ferkó, 66, Slovak politician, MP (1994–2002).
- Jeremiah Green, 45, American indie rock drummer (Modest Mouse), cancer.
- Knut Hanselmann, 76, Norwegian politician, MP (1989–1993), cancer.
- Edward I-hsin Chen, 72, Taiwanese politician, MP (1996–1999).
- W. Stine Isenhower, 95, American politician, member of the North Carolina House of Representatives (1987–1993).
- Jiang Long, 89, Chinese physical chemist, member of the Chinese Academy of Sciences.
- Tom Karen, 96, Austrian-born British industrial designer.
- Kim Jung-man, 68, South Korean photographer, pneumonia.
- John M. Klineberg, 84, American aerospace engineer.
- Daniel Labille, 90, French Roman Catholic prelate, bishop of Soissons (1984–1998) and Créteil (1998–2007).
- Barry Lane, 62, English golfer, cancer.
- Jaffar Khan Leghari, 81, Pakistani politician, MNA (since 2002).
- Ralph Lenhart, 92, American politician, member of the Montana House of Representatives (2003–2007).
- John Martin-Dye, 82, British Olympic swimmer (1960, 1964), complications from Alzheimer's disease.
- Dori Monson, 61, American radio host and actor (Bill Nye the Science Guy).
- Mike Pappas, 81, Greek-born American professional wrestler (WWF, NWA).
- Anita Pointer, 74, American singer (The Pointer Sisters), cancer.
- Salvador Sánchez-Terán, 88, Spanish lawyer and politician, minister of transport and communications (1978–1980) and of labour (1980), deputy (1977–1982).
- Herb Snitzer, 90, American photographer, complications from Parkinson's disease.
- Pietro Spada, 87, Italian pianist and musicologist.
- David Swinford, 81, American politician, member of the Texas House of Representatives (1990–2010).
- Miroslav Vacek, 87, Czech army general and politician, minister of national defense of Czechoslovakia (1989–1990), chief of the general staff of the Czechoslovak People's Army (1987–1989).
- Bert-Åke Varg, 90, Swedish actor (Exponerad, Kärlekens språk, Rederiet) and singer, heart attack.
- Wang Fosong, 89, Chinese polymer chemist, member of the Chinese Academy of Sciences.
- Darren Watts, 53, American game designer, complications from a heart attack.
- Karla Wilson, 88, American politician, member of the Washington House of Representatives (1985–1991).
- Cary Young, 83, New Zealand-born Australian game show host (Sale of the Century).
- Yu Dequan, 90, Chinese pharmaceutical chemist, member of the Chinese Academy of Engineering.
