= Robert Dowling =

Robert Dowling may refer to:

- Robert Hawker Dowling (1827–1886), Australian artist
- Robert Wagner Dowling (1924–2019), Alberta MLA 1971–1979
- Robert W. Dowling (1895–1973), benefactor to Dowling College
- Sir Robert Dowling (teacher), Birmingham educator
- Robert Dowling (publisher) (1939–2022), American magazine publisher
- Robert E. Dowling, founding director of National Reserve Bank of the City of New York in 1909
