= François Tanguy =

French theatre director (1958–2022)

- Born: 23 June 1958; Caen, France
- Died: 6 December 2022 (aged 64); Le Mans, France
- Occupation: Theatre director

François Tanguy (23 June 1958 – 6 December 2022) was a French theatre director.

His father, a secretary of a college in the Paris suburbs, was part of an amateur theatre group close to Jacques Lassalle. In 1982, he became director of the Théâtre du Radeau, founded in 1977. In 1985, the theatre moved to Le Mans and was renamed La Fonderie in 1992.

Tanguy advocated for undocumented migrants in Bosnia, for which he led a hunger strike in 1995 alongside Ariane Mnouchkine and Olivier Py.

In 2018, Tanguy received the Prix SACD.

Tanguy died in Le Mans on 6 December 2022, at the age of 64.

== Pieces directed ==
- Dom Juan (1982)
- L’Eden et les cendres (1983)
- Le Retable de Séraphin (1984)
- A Midsummer Night's Dream (1985)
- Mystère Bouffe (1986)
- Jeu de Faust (1987)
- Woyzeck - Büchner - Fragments forains (1989)
- Chant du Bouc (1991)
- Choral (1994)
- Bataille du Tagliamento (1996)
- Orphéon - Bataille - suite lyrique (1998)
- Les Cantates (2001)
- Coda (2004)
- Ricercar (2007)
- Onzième (2011)
- Passim (2013)
- Soubresaut (2016)
- Item (2019)
- Par autan (2022)
