= Klemens Ludwig =

German writer and astrologist (1955–2022)

- Born: 23 December 1955; Warstein, North Rhine-Westphalia, West Germany
- Died: 12 December 2022 (aged 66)
- Occupations: Astrologist; Writer

Klemens Ludwig (23 December 1955 – 12 December 2022) was a German astrologist, writer, publicist, and Tibetan scholar. He became first chairman of the Deutscher Astrologen-Verband in 2015.

== Biography ==
After completing his secondary studies in Rüthen in 1975, Ludwig studied English and theology in Tübingen. In 1986, he visited Tibet for the first time and traveled there several times before his visa was refused by the Chinese government in 2004. However, he maintained his close ties with the Tibetan community in India, Nepal, and Switzerland and was president of the Tibet Initiative Deutschland from 1994 to 2000. He published numerous books and articles on Tibet.

Suffering from amyotrophic lateral sclerosis, Ludwig died on 12 December 2022, at the age of 66.

== Awards ==
- "Media Prize Astrology" of the Deutscher Astrologen-Verband (1995)

== Publications ==
- Osttimor – Das vergessene Sterben (1985)
- Bedrohte Völker. Ein Lexikon nationaler und religiöser Minderheiten (1985)
- Lebenslieder – Todesklagen, Ein Lesebuch vergessener Völker (1988)
- Tibet – Eine Länderkunde (1989)
- Tibet klagt an (1990)
- Der neue Tourismus (1990)
- Tibet – Glaube gegen Gewehre (1991)
- Das Baltikum – Eine Länderkunde (1991)
- Augenzeugen lügen nicht. Journalistenberichte: Anspruch und Wirklichkeit (1992)
- Europa zerfällt, Völker ohne Staaten und der neue Nationalismus (1993)
- Flüstere zu dem Felsen. Die Botschaft der Ureinwohner der Erde zur Bewahrung der Schöpfung (1993)
- Phantom Atom. Abgründe der Atomtechnologie und Wege aus der Gefahr (1993)
- Ethnische Minderheiten in Europa. Ein Lexikon (1995)
- Osttimor – Der zwanzigjährige Krieg (1996)
- Birma – Eine Länderkunde (1997)
- Der Weg zum Potala, Ein Roman aus dem alten Tibet (1997)
- Tibet: Schönheit – Zerstörung – Zukunft (1998)
- Estland – Eine Länderkunde (1999)
- Lettland – Eine Länderkunde (2000)
- Perspektiven für Tibet (2000)
- Das große Lexikon der Astrologie (2001)
- Das Horoskop meines Kindes. Kinder in ihrer Einzigartigkeit verstehen und unterstützen (2001)
- Dalai Lama – Botschafter des Mitgefühls (2008)
- Das große Handbuch der Astrologie (2008)
- Wenn der Eisenvogel fliegt – Tibeter im Exil (2008)
- Vielvölkerstaat China – Die nationalen Minderheiten im Reich der Mitte (2009)
- Die Schwarze Hofmännin: Ein Bauernkriegsroman (2010)
- Die Opferrolle. Der Islam und seine Inszenierung (2011)
- Gendün – Die Rückkehr des Panchen Lama (2012)
- Astrologie in der Kunst – 4000 Jahre kosmische Harmonie und Ästhetik (2013)
