= Floris Maljers =

Dutch business executive (1933–2022)

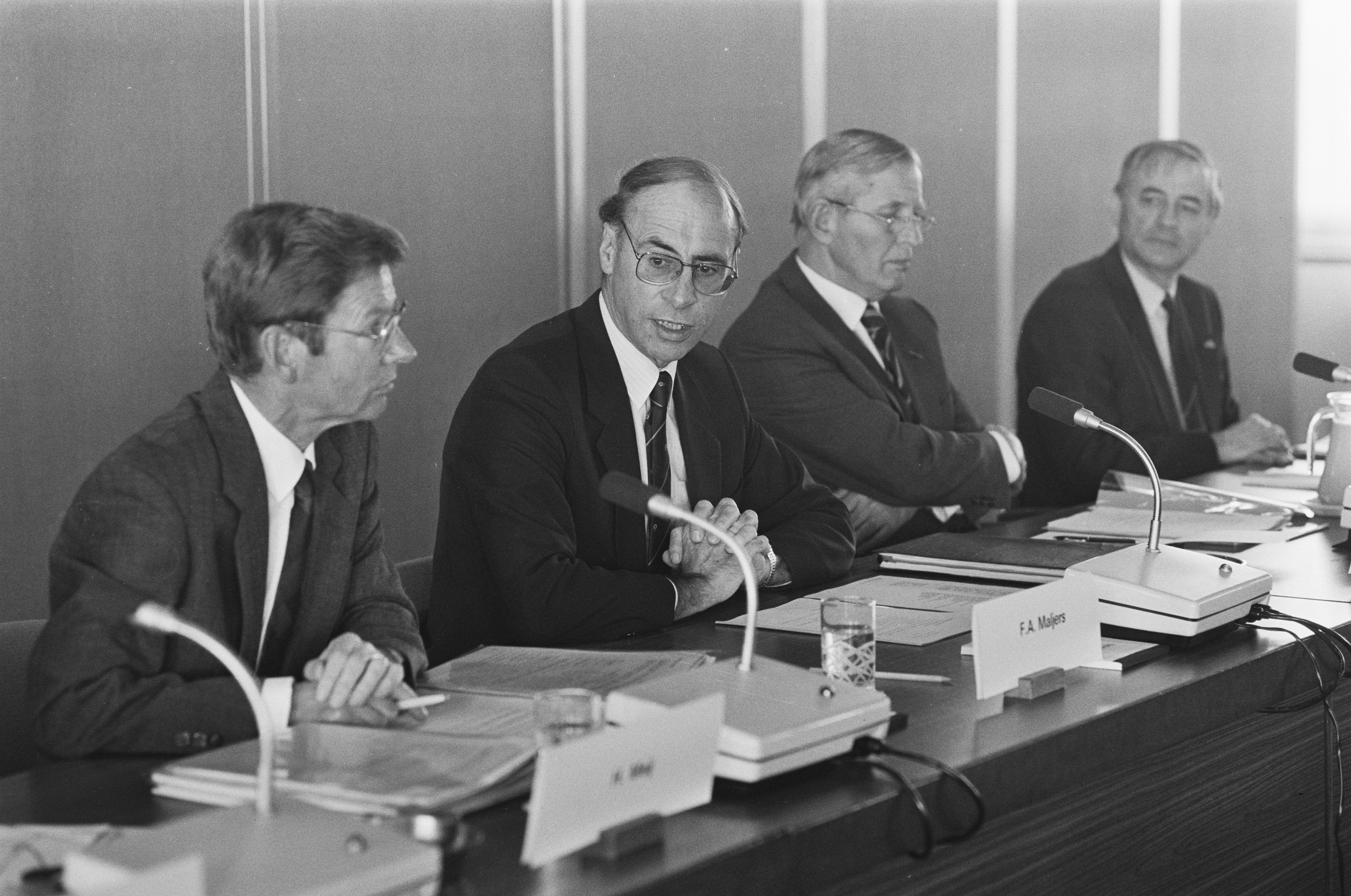
Maljers (2nd left) during an Unilever press conference (1987)

Floris Anton Maljers (12 August 1933 – 2 December 2022) was a Dutch business executive. He was CEO of the Unilever food group (1984–1994) and was chairperson at KLM, Philips and Vendex International. As a mentor, he guided Willem-Alexander of the Netherlands during his introduction to the business world.

== Biography ==
Maljers was born in Middelburg in 1933 into a grocer's family. He studied economics at the University of Amsterdam. After graduating he started as an intern at a parent company of Unilever, where he quickly made his career. Via a Colombian fat factory, a Turkish jasmine plantation and a margarine factory in Rotterdam, he became in 1984 CEO of the Unilever. He was granted an honour by British Queen Elizabeth II. In 1994 he was succeeded as CEO by Morris Tabaksblad. As he remained active in business world, and so became a mentor for Willem-Alexander of the Netherlands. From 1994 to 1999 he was the chairman at Philips. He also worked several times for Dutch ministries as a troubleshooter to solve economic issues like at the request of minister Hans Wijers being involved in the government support for the bankrupt Fokker and he was commission chairman for the flooding of the Hedwigepolder.

He received the gold Eremedaille voor Voortvarendheid en Vernuft.
