= Dick Burrows =

Australian rules footballer (1941–2022)

Personal information
- Full name: Richard Burrows
- Born: 17 October 1941
- Died: 15 December 2022 (aged 81)
- Original team: Greensborough
- Height: 189 cm (6 ft 2 in)
- Weight: 81 kg (179 lb)

Playing career^{1}
Years	Club	Games (Goals)
1961	Richmond	5 (0)
- ^{1} Playing statistics correct to the end of 1961.

Richard Burrows (17 October 1941 – 15 December 2022) was an Australian rules footballer who played with Richmond in the Victorian Football League (VFL).
