= Janine Ghobert =

Belgian politician (1931–2022)

Member of the Chamber of Representatives of Belgium
- In office 24 November 1991 – 21 December 1992

Member of the Senate of Belgium
- In office 7 December 1981 – 24 November 1991

Personal details
- Born: 24 April 1931 Ghent, Belgium
- Died: 18 December 2022 (aged 91) Ixelles, Belgium
- Party: PRL
- Occupation: Jurist

Janine Ghobert (24 April 1931 – 18 December 2022) was a Belgian jurist and politician of the Liberal Reformist Party (PRL).

== Biography ==
Ghobert earned a doctorate in law and specialized in political science and international relations. She was president of the Conseil national de Protection de la Jeunesse from 1975 to 1981, president of the Conseil supérieur des Œuvres de l'Enfance from 1979 to 1983, and president of the Office de la naissance et de l'enfance from 1983 to 1988. She was honorary vice-president of the King Baudouin Foundation and honorary president of Solidarité Libérale internationale. She was vice-president of the Comité national pour la célébration 40-60 du roi Baudouin Ier de Belgique.

Ghobert served in the Senate from 7 December 1981 to 24 November 1991 and was a member of the Chamber of Representatives from 24 November 1991 to 21 December 1992. On the latter date, she was nominated to be a judge on the Constitutional Court, a mandate from which she retired on 24 April 2001.

Ghobert was the wife of Baron Jacques Delruelle. She died in Ixelles on 18 December 2022, at the age of 91.

== Decorations ==
- Officer of the Order of Leopold
- Grand Officer of the National Order of the Lion
- Officer of the Order of the Republic of Tunisia
