= Valentina Firsova =

Soviet-Russian politician (1937–2022)

Member of the Supreme Soviet of the Soviet Union
- In office 1974–1979

Personal details
- Born: Valentina Alexandra Firsova; 22 September 1937 Glushkovsky District, Kursk Oblast, Russian SFSR, Soviet Union
- Died: 19 December 2022 (aged 85) Bender, Transnistria, Moldova
- Party: CPSU (1965–1991)

Valentina Alexandra Firsova (Russian: Валентина Александровна Фирсова; 22 September 1937 – 19 December 2022) was a Soviet-Russian politician. A member of the Communist Party, she served on the Supreme Soviet of the Soviet Union from 1974 to 1979.

Firsova died in Bender on 19 December 2022, at the age of 85.
