= Éric Pfrunder =

French artistic director (1948–2022)

- Born: June 1948; Constantine, French Algeria
- Died: 5 December 2022 in Paris (aged 74)
- Occupation: Artistic director

Éric Pfrunder (June 1948 – December 2022) was a French artistic director for Chanel. He became their first image director in 1983, and left the company in 2021.

Pfrunder became artistic director after the death of Karl Lagerfeld, while Virginie Viard became creative director. He notably allowed Lagerfeld to become director of photography for Chanel.

Pfrunder died in December 2022, at the age of 74.
