= Antonio Mazzone =

Italian politician (1934–2022)

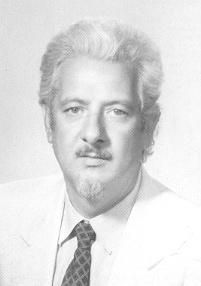
- Mazzone in 1983

Member of the Chamber of Deputies of Italy
- In office 1 April 1994 – 8 May 1996
- Constituency: Naples
- In office 3 July 1983 – 18 October 1989
- Constituency: Naples

Member of the European Parliament
- In office 26 October 1989 – 18 July 1994
- Constituency: Southern Italy

Member of the Regional Council of Campania
- In office 1975–1984

Personal details
- Born: 19 December 1934 Naples, Italy
- Died: 10 December 2022 (aged 87)
- Party: MSI; AN
- Occupation: Lawyer

Antonio Mazzone (19 December 1934 – 10 December 2022) was an Italian politician. A member of the Italian Social Movement and the National Alliance, he served in the Chamber of Deputies from 1983 to 1989 and 1994 to 1996 and was a member of the European Parliament from 1989 to 1994.

Mazzone died on 10 December 2022, at the age of 87.
