= Joseph Torg =

American orthopedic surgeon

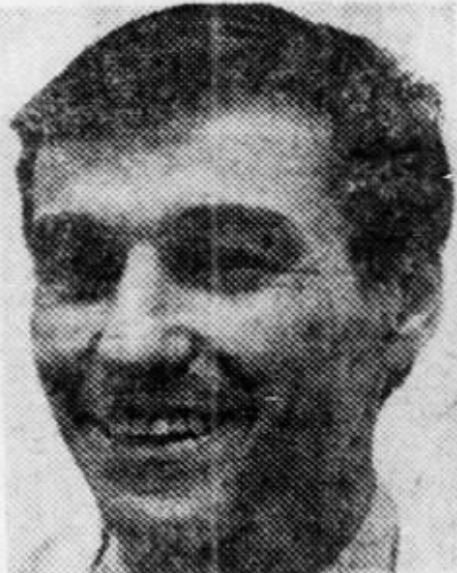
- Torg in 1972
- Born: Joseph Steven Torg; October 25, 1934; Philadelphia, Pennsylvania, U.S.
- Died: December 15, 2022 (aged 88)
- Education: Haverford College; Temple University School of Medicine
- Occupation: Orthopedic surgeon

Joseph Steven Torg (October 25, 1934 – December 15, 2022) was an American orthopedic surgeon.

== Life and career ==
Torg was born in Philadelphia. He attended Haverford College and Temple University School of Medicine.

Torg was a medical consultant for the Philadelphia 76ers basketball team. He was also an assistant professor of orthopedic at Temple University School of Medicine.

Torg died on December 15, 2022, at the age of 88.
