= Gu Zhen'an =

Chinese scientist (1936–2022)

- 顾真安
- Born: 16 November 1936; Wuxi County, Jiangsu, China
- Died: 22 December 2022 (aged 86); Beijing, China
- Education: East China University of Science and Technology
- Scientific career
- Fields: Inorganic non-metallic materials
- Workplaces: China Building Materials Research Institute

Chinese name
- Simplified Chinese: 顾真安
- Traditional Chinese: 顧真安
Transcriptions
Standard Mandarin
- Hanyu Pinyin: Gù Zhēn'ān

Gu Zhen'an (Chinese: 顾真安; 16 November 1936 – 22 December 2022) was a Chinese engineer, and an academician of the Chinese Academy of Engineering.

== Biography ==
Gu was born in Wuxi County (now Wuxi), Jiangsu, on 16 November 1936. He attended Wuxi No. 1 High School. In 1954, he entered East China University of Chemical Technology (now East China University of Science and Technology), where he majored in silicate.

After graduating in 1958, Gu was assigned to China Building Materials Research Institute. He stayed there for 16 years, interspersed with a year at Lanzhou Glass Factory and two years at the May Seventh Cadre Schools. He joined the Chinese Communist Party (CCP) in November 1982. In January 1986, he was appointed director of the National Quartz Glass Quality Supervision Center, a post he kept until January 1997.

On 22 December 2022, Gu died in Beijing, at the age of 86.

== Honours and awards ==
- 1997 Member of the Chinese Academy of Engineering (CAE)
