= Bernadette Carey Smith =

American journalist (1939–2022)

- Born: October 27, 1939; New York City, U.S.
- Died: December 5, 2022 (aged 83)
- Occupation: Journalist

Bernadette Carey Smith (October 27, 1939 – December 5, 2022), also known by the byline Bernadette Carey, was an American journalist. In the 1960s, she was one of the first African-American women to work as a reporter at The New York Times and at The Washington Post.

== Early life and education ==
She was born in Manhattan in 1939, with the name Alice Bernadette Carey or Bernadette Alice Louise Carey. Her parents were Dr. Jocelyn Everard Carey, a family physician, and Mae Carey (née McDonald), a homemaker and member of the NAACP.

== Career ==
Carey was the first Black female reporter to work at The New York Times. She covered fashion and society news.

Carey served as editor-in-chief of Essence magazine in the initial stages of its development, but left before its first issue was published. Then a "star" at The Washington Post, she had been recommended to the publication's founding partners by Clay Felker, the editor of New York magazine, because of her experience with general market magazines, including Esquire and Look, as well as The New York Times women's news department. Carey attended meetings with investors and advertisers, compiled market research, and worked on ideas for initial issues and stories. However, she had disagreements over the magazine's editorial direction with the four male partners, who also balked when she asked for a five-percent stake in The Hollingsworth Group. Carey later described her role at Essence as "editor-in-formation". She was succeeded by Ruth Ross, who also left the magazine after editing the first issue, citing the lack of editorial authority.

After ending her career in journalism, Smith founded a Chicago public relations firm.

== Personal life and death ==
Carey had a high-profile relationship with David Frost, who went on to date actress Diahann Carroll.

== Publications ==
- Carey, Bernadette (December 14, 1965). "Two Bit Bet: Financing a Crime Empire". Look. pp. 131–132.
