= Li Tianchu =

Chinese metrologist (1945–2022)

- 李天初
- Born: 4 November 1945; Guiyang, Guizhou, China
- Died: 28 December 2022 (aged 77); Beijing, China
- Education: Tsinghua University
- Scientific career
- Fields: Metrology
- Workplaces: National Institute of Metrology

Li Tianchu (Chinese: 李天初; pinyin: Lǐ Tiānchū; 4 November 1945 – 28 December 2022) was a Chinese metrologist, and an academician of the Chinese Academy of Engineering. He was a member of the Chinese Communist Party (CCP).

== Biography ==
Li was born in Guiyang, Guizhou, on 4 November 1945, while his ancestral home is in Jinzhai County, Anhui. In 1964, he entered Tsinghua University, graduating in 1970 with a bachelor's degree in combustion physics. He went on to receive his master's degree in laser applications in 1981 and doctor's degree in engineering optics in 1991 at Tsinghua University. From October 1984 to November 1986, he studied at the National Physical Laboratory in the United Kingdom.

Li joined the National Institute of Metrology in December 1986, becoming research follow in 1994 and senior research follow in 2005.

Li died on 28 December 2022, at the age of 77.

== Honours and awards ==
- 1995 State Science and Technology Progress Award (Third Class)
- 2002 State Science and Technology Progress Award (Second Class)
- 2006 State Science and Technology Progress Award (First Class)
- 2011 Member of the Chinese Academy of Engineering (CAE)
- 2015 Science and Technology Achievement Award of the Ho Leung Ho Lee Foundation
- 2016 State Science and Technology Progress Award (First Class)
