= Petre Constantin Buchwald =

Romanian politician (1937–2022)

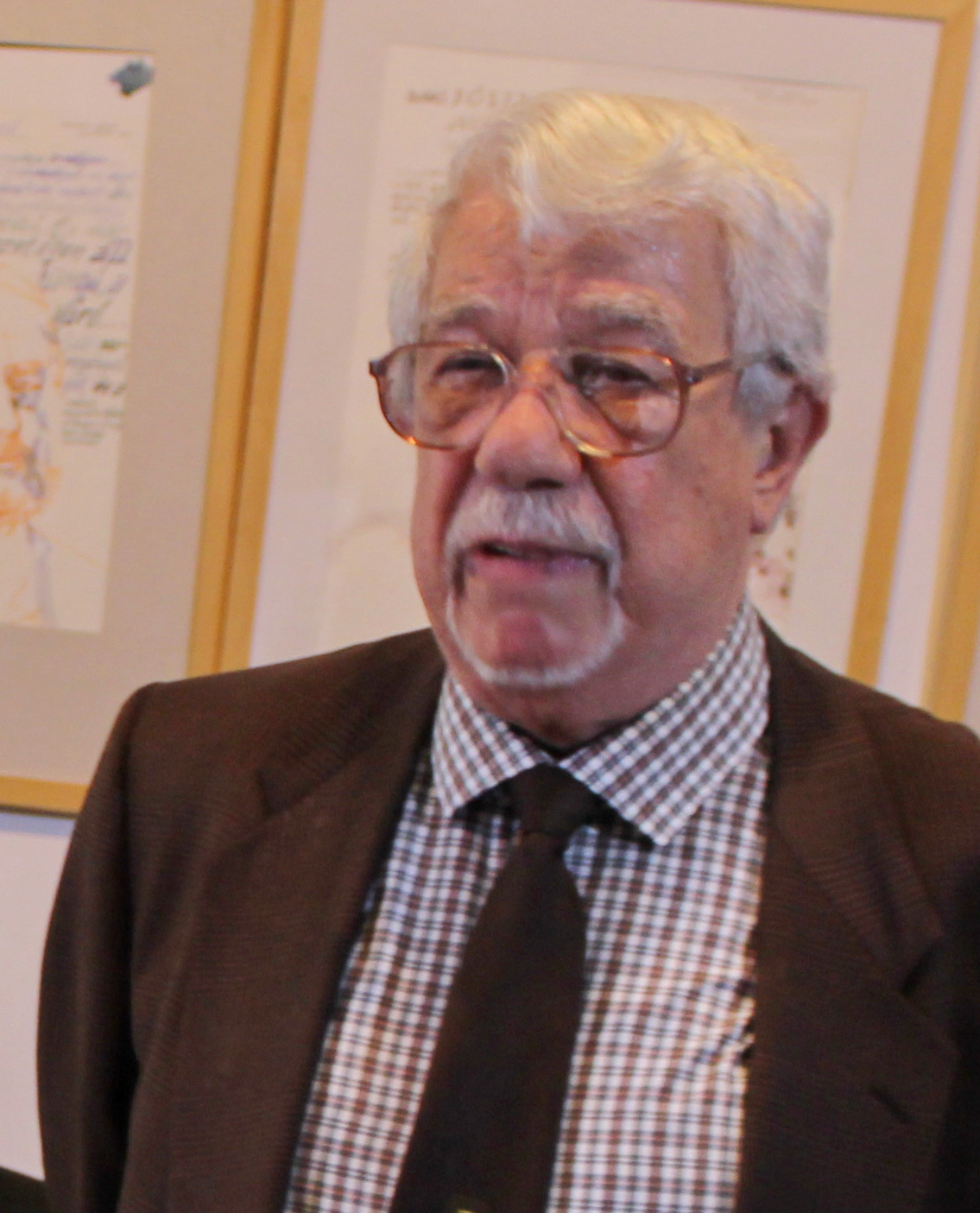
- Buchwald in 2017

Member of the Senate of Romania
- In office 1992–1996
- Constituency: Electoral district no. 13 Cluj

Personal details
- Born: 21 May 1937 Cluj-Napoca, Romania
- Died: 16 December 2022 (aged 85)
- Party: RMDSZ
- Education: Babeș-Bolyai University
- Occupation: Chemist

Petre Constantin Buchwald (Hungarian: Buchwald Péter Szilárd; 21 May 1937 – 16 December 2022) was a Romanian politician. A member of the Democratic Alliance of Hungarians in Romania, he served in the Senate from 1992 to 1996.

Buchwald died on 16 December 2022, at the age of 85.
