= Patricia Daly =

American sister (1956–2022)

Patricia Daly (August 4, 1956 – December 9, 2022) was an American sister and leader in the field of socially responsible investing. She was the executive director of Tri-State Coalition for Responsible Investment, now known as Investor Advocates for Social Justice, a group formed of religious orders that used their ownership of shares in corporations by their pension funds in order to promote responsible behavior in issues such as environmental protection, social justice, and climate change.

== Biography ==
Daly entered the Sisters of Saint Dominic in 1975, and received the habit in 1976. She made her final profession in 1984.

Daly earned a BA in Religious Studies from Sacred Heart University and then an MA in Theology of Justice from the Maryknoll School of Theology.

== Awards and honors ==
Daly was awarded an Honorary Doctorate in Business Leadership from Duquesne University and an Honorary Doctor of Laws from William Paterson University.
