= Harald Schießl =

German jurist (1974–2022)

Judge of the Federal Fiscal Court
- In office 9 April 2015 – 1 December 2022

Personal details
- Born: 28 June 1974
- Died: 1 December 2022 (aged 48)
- Occupation: Jurist

Harald Schießl (28 June 1974 – 1 December 2022) was a German jurist. He served on the Federal Fiscal Court from 2015 to 2022.

Schießl died on 1 December 2022, at the age of 48, following a long illness.
