= Bernard Chabbert =

French writer and journalist (1944–2022)

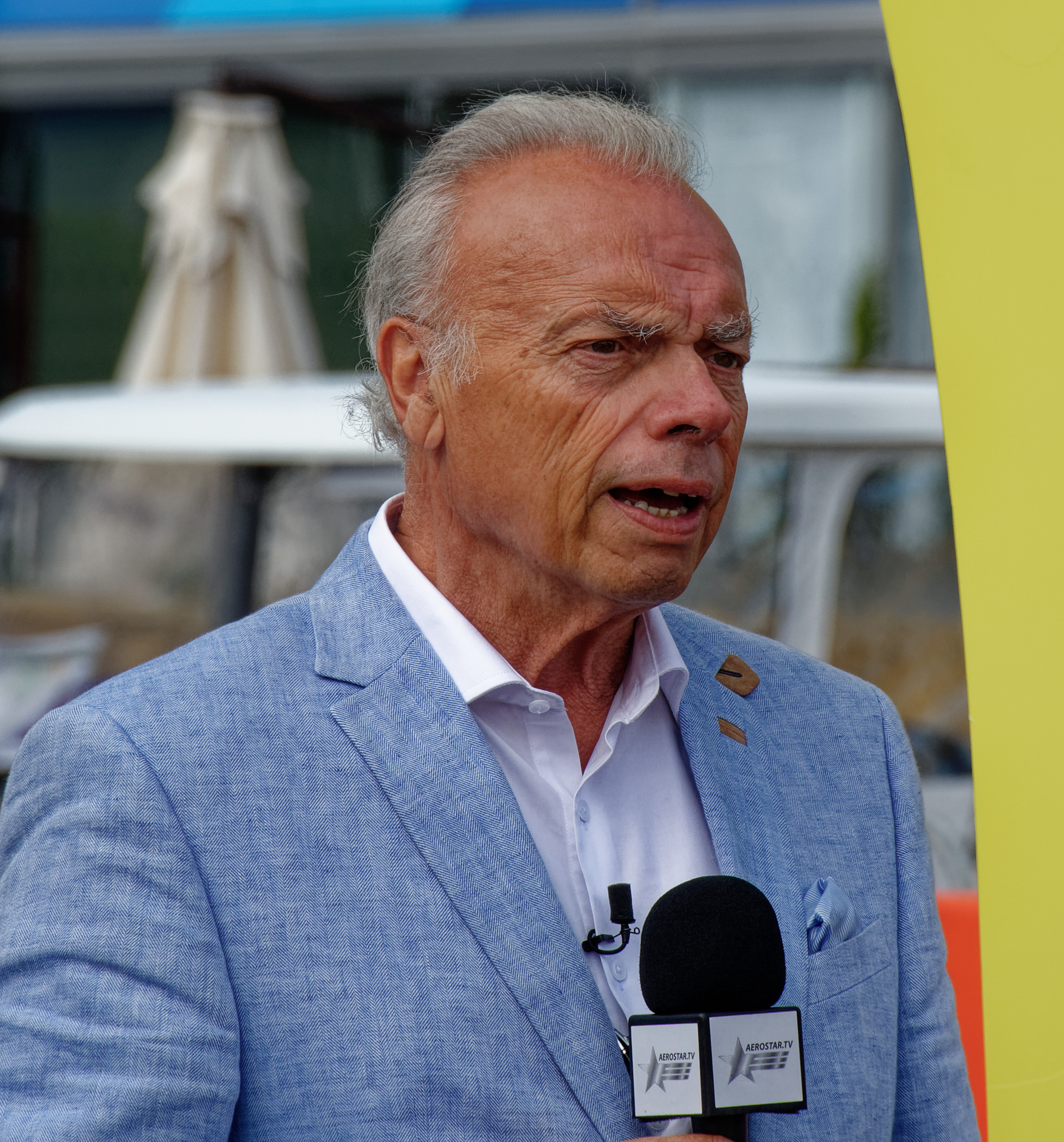
- Chabbert in 2015
- Born: 21 April 1944; Casablanca, French Morocco
- Died: 15 December 2022 (aged 78); Andernos-les-Bains, France
- Occupations: Writer, journalist

Bernard Chabbert (21 April 1944 – 15 December 2022) was a French writer and journalist who specialized in the field of aviation. The son of the co-founder of Air Mauritius, he was a recipient of the Prix Jacquemetton of the Société astronomique de France (2022). Chabbert died in Andernos-les-Bains on 15 December 2022, at the age of 78.

== Distinctions ==
- Marius Jacquemetton Prize of the Société astronomique de France (2022)

== Publications ==
- La foire aux aigles
- Les fils d'Ariane
- Spatiale première
- L'homme-fusée
- Manche et Manette
- Saint-Ex - Un prince dans sa citadelle
