= Willi Blodt =

German politician (1929–2022)

Member of the Landtag of Hesse
- In office 1 December 1966 – 30 November 1970

Member of the Federal Convention of Germany
- In office 5 March 1969

Personal details
- Born: 4 November 1929 Wolfskehlen, Riedstadt, Hesse, Germany
- Died: 3 December 2022 (aged 93)
- Party: SPD
- Occupation: Administrator

Willi Blodt (4 November 1929 – 3 December 2022) was a German politician. A member of the Social Democratic Party, he served in the Landtag of Hesse from 1966 to 1970. Mayor of Wolfskehlen 1960-1970, later Landrat of District Groß-Gerau.

Blodt died on 3 December 2022, at the age of 93.
