= Karel van Eerd =

Dutch entrepreneur (1938–2022)

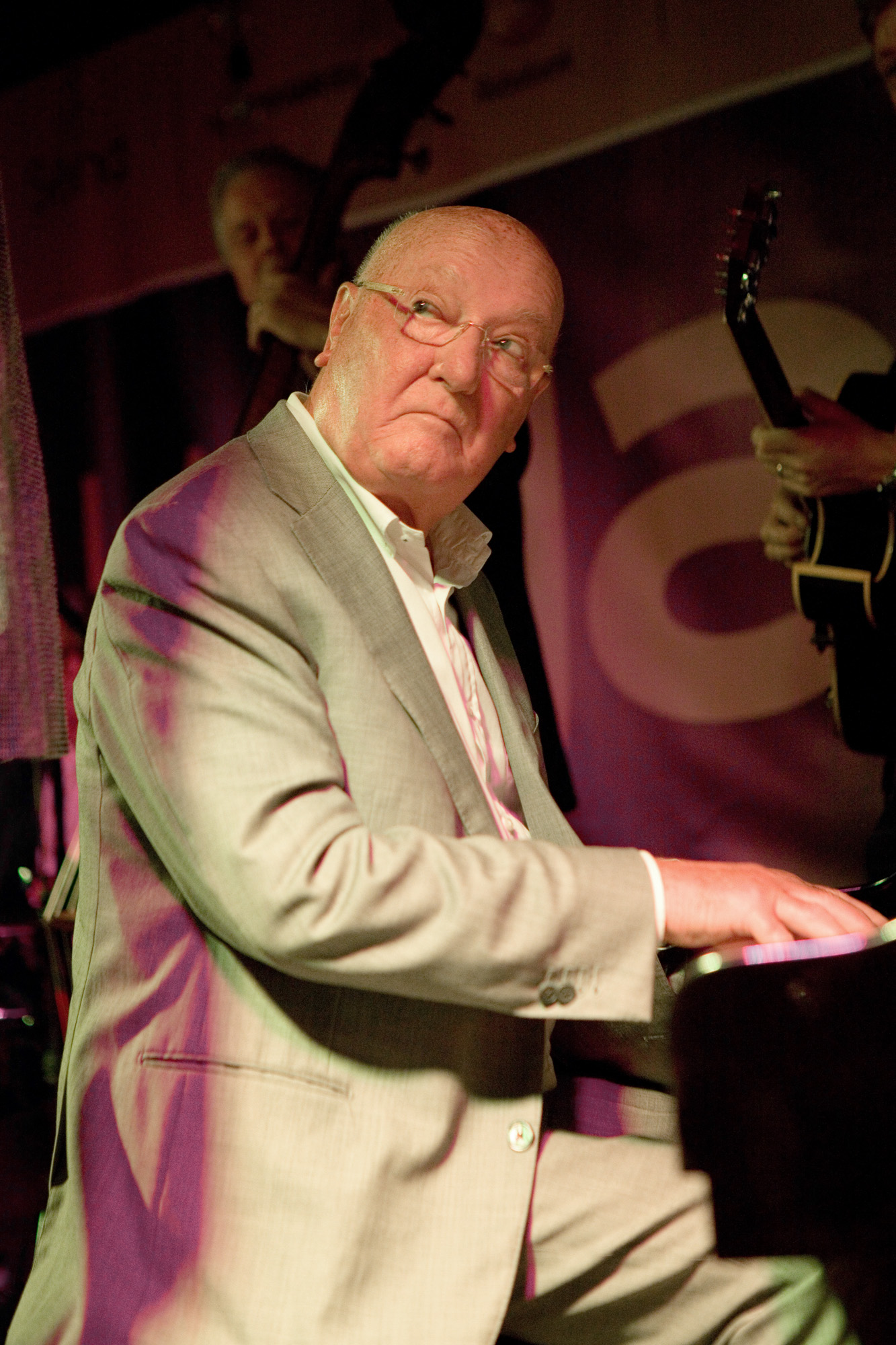
- Van Eerd in 2015
- Born: Carolus Johannes Maria van Eerd; 8 April 1938; Veghel, Netherlands
- Died: 14 December 2022 (aged 84); Veghel, Netherlands
- Occupation: businessman

Carolus Johannes Maria "Karel" van Eerd (8 April 1938 – 14 December 2022) was a Dutch supermarket entrepreneur. For many years he was general manager and then chairman of the supervisory board of supermarkets Jumbo.

Van Eerd came from a family that owned food wholesalers since the early 20th-century. In 1957, when he was 18 years old, he joined the business at the time his father had to take it easy. He soon took over the management. Van Eerd took over the name "Jumbo" and its formula in 1984 from Jan Meurs. In the mid-1980s there were three Jumbo stores. In 2022, at the time of his death, there were over 700 Jumbo supermarkets, including some in Belgium.

Van Eerd died in Veghel on 14 December 2022, at the age of 84.
