= Zhao Yijun =

Chinese engineer (1930–2022)

- 赵伊君
- Born: 26 November 1930; Peiping, China
- Died: 21 December 2022 (aged 92); Beijing, China
- Education: Peking University
- Scientific career
- Fields: Laser technology
- Workplaces: Harbin Institute of Military Engineering (1953–1970); National University of Defense Technology (1970–1982); China Defense Science and Technology Information Center (1980–1982)

Chinese name
- Simplified Chinese: 赵伊君
- Traditional Chinese: 趙伊君
Transcriptions
Standard Mandarin
- Hanyu Pinyin: Zhào Yījūn

Zhao Yijun (Chinese: 赵伊君; 26 November 1930 – 21 December 2022) was a Chinese engineer, and an academician of the Chinese Academy of Engineering.

== Biography ==
Zhao was born in Peiping (now Beijing), on 26 November 1930, to Zhao Guangzeng, a physicist. He had a younger brother named Zhao Yisun (赵伊笋) who died from an illness at an early age. During the Second Sino-Japanese War, in order to escape the war, his family relocated to Chongqing, where he attended the School Affiliated to Central University in 1944. In 1950, he was admitted to Peking University, where he majored in physics.

After graduating in 1953, Zhao was dispatched to Harbin Institute of Military Engineering, where he worked at the Department of Naval Engineering from 1953 to 1962 and the Department of Atomic Engineering from 1962 to 1970. In January 1970, he moved to National University of Defense Technology, and taught at the Department of Physics. He joined the Chinese Communist Party (CCP) in December 1984.

On 21 December 2022, Zhao died in Beijing, at the age of 92.

== Honours and awards ==
- 1997 Member of the Chinese Academy of Engineering (CAE)
- 1997 State Science and Technology Progress Award (Second Class)
- 2008 State Science and Technology Progress Award (Second Class)
