= Volodymyr Kvurt =

Ukrainian entrepreneur and politician (1967–2022)

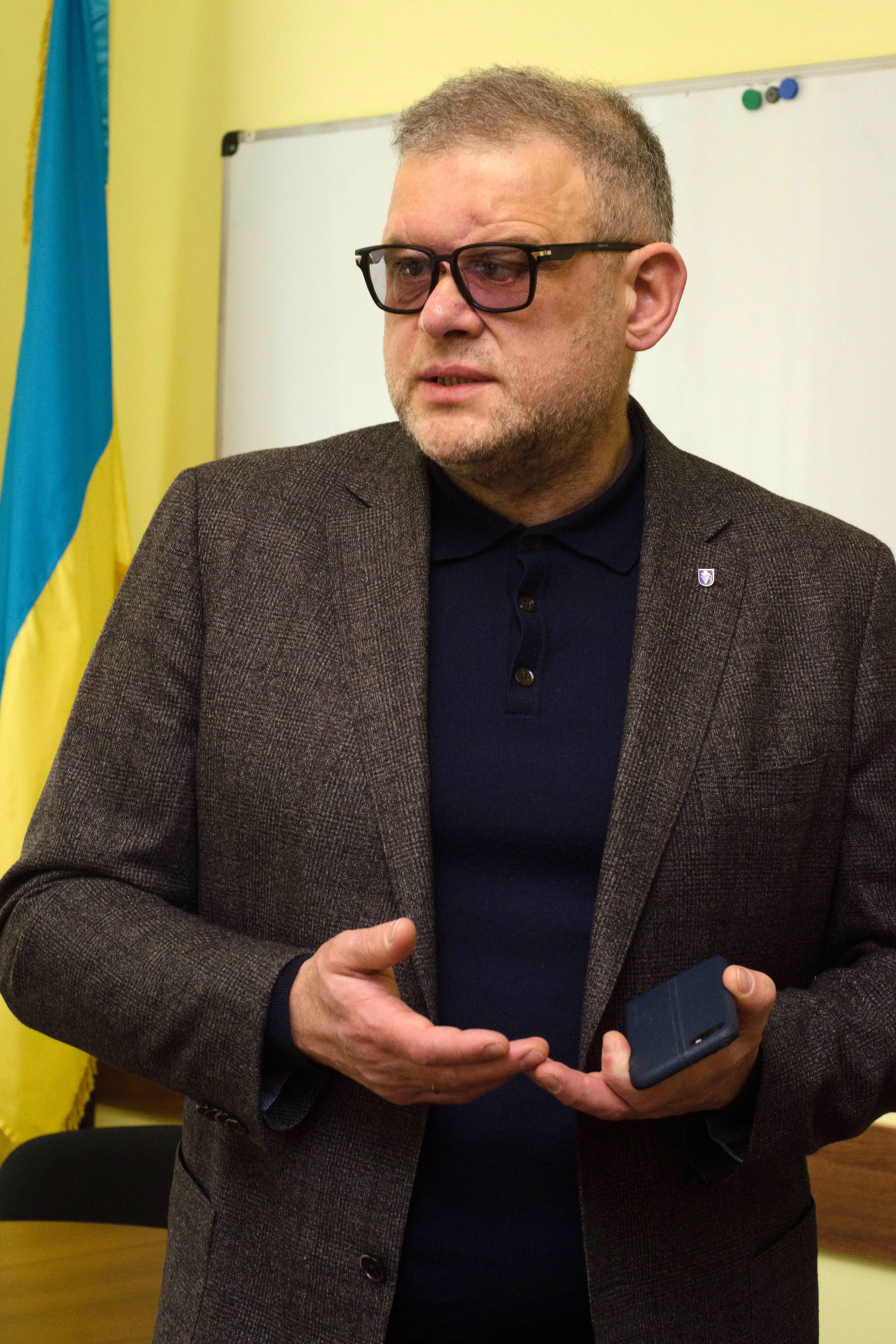
- Kvurt in 2019

Member of the Lviv Oblast Council
- In office 25 October 2020 – 28 December 2022

Personal details
- Born: Volodymyr Leonidovych Kvurt; 1 August 1967 Movchanivka,Rokytne Raion, Kyiv Oblast, Ukrainian SSR, USSR
- Died: 28 December 2022 (aged 55)
- Party: European Solidarity
- Education: Lviv Polytechnic
- Occupation: Entrepreneur

Volodymyr Leonidovych Kvurt (Ukrainian: Володимир Леонідович Квурт; 1 August 1967 – 28 December 2022) was a Ukrainian entrepreneur and politician. A member of European Solidarity, he served on the Lviv Oblast Council from 2020 to 2022.

Kvurt died on 28 December 2022, at the age of 55.
