= Oleh Bobalo =

Ukrainian film director and soldier (1978–2022)

- Native name: Олег Бобало
- Born: 19 January 1978; Lviv, Ukrainian Soviet Socialist Republic, Soviet Union
- Died: 20 December 2022 (aged 44) Bakhmut, Donetsk Oblast, Ukraine
- Allegiance: Ukraine
- Branch: Armed Forces of Ukraine
- Service years: 2022
- Conflicts: Russo-Ukrainian War; Russian Invasion of Ukraine; Battle of Bakhmut †

Oleh Mykhailovych Bobalo (Ukrainian: Олег Михайлович Бобало; January 19, 1978 – December 20, 2022) was a Ukrainian director and soldier in the Armed Forces of Ukraine.

== Personal life ==
He was born on 19 January 1978 in Lviv in what was, at the time, the Ukrainian Soviet Socialist Republic, USSR. In 2022, Oleh joined the Armed Forces of Ukraine to fight against the Russian Invasion of Ukraine. He was subsequently killed on the battlefields of Bakhmut, Donetsk Oblast, on 20 December 2022.

== Directorial work ==
Oleh is known for his film titled "The structure of coffee, or yabzats", as well as for directing films such as "Другий фронт" (The Second Front) and "Диверсанты" (Saboteurs).
