= Emilio Pegoraro =

Italian partisan and politician (1921–2022)

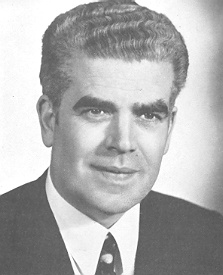
- Pegoraro in 1972

Member of the Senate of the Republic of Italy
- In office 5 July 1976 – 19 June 1979
- Constituency: Verona
- In office 5 June 1968 – 24 May 1972
- Constituency: Verona

Member of the Chamber of Deputies of Italy
- In office 17 May 1972 – 4 July 1976
- Constituency: Verona

Personal details
- Born: 19 October 1921 Fontaniva, Italy
- Died: 18 December 2022 (aged 101) Padua, Italy
- Party: PCI
- Occupation: Partisan

Emilio Pegoraro (19 October 1921 – 18 December 2022) was an Italian partisan and politician. A member of the Communist Party, he served in the Senate of the Republic from 1968 to 1972 and again from 1976 to 1979 and in the Chamber of Deputies from 1972 to 1976.

Pegoraro died in Padua on 18 December 2022, at the age of 101.
