= Maurice Briand =

French politician (1949–2022)

Deputy of the French National Assembly for Côtes-d'Armor's 4th constituency
- In office 12 June 1988 – 1 April 1993
- Preceded by: proportional representation
- Succeeded by: Daniel Pennec
- In office 21 June 1981 – 1 April 1986
- Preceded by: François Leizour
- Succeeded by: proportional representation

Mayor of Guingamp
- In office 1983–1989
- Preceded by: François Leizour
- Succeeded by: Albert Lissillour

Personal details
- Born: 9 June 1949 Plouisy, France
- Died: 18 December 2022 (aged 73)
- Party: PS
- Occupation: Lawyer

Maurice Briand (French: [mɔris bʁijɑ̃]; 9 June 1949 – 18 December 2022) was a French lawyer and politician of the Socialist Party (PS).

== Biography ==
Prior to his political career, Briand worked as a lawyer for Vigipol. From 1983 to 1989, he was Mayor of Guingamp. He was a deputy of the National Assembly for Côtes-d'Armor's 4th constituency from 1981 to 1986 and again from 1988 to 1993. In 1985, a bomb attack targeted his office. In 2002, he endorsed Marie-Renée Oget for the seat. In 2008, he announced his retirement from politics.

Briand was married and the father of two children. He died on 18 December 2022, at the age of 73.
