= Germán Tena Orozco =

Mexican politician (1934–2022)

Member of the Chamber of Deputies of Mexico
- In office 1 September 1985 – 31 August 1988

Personal details
- Born: 22 October 1934; Morelia, Mexico
- Died: 23 December 2022 (aged 88)
- Political party: PAN
- Education: Universidad Michoacana de San Nicolás de Hidalgo
- Occupation: Businessman

Germán Tena Orozco (22 October 1934 – 23 December 2022) was a Mexican businessman and politician. A member of the National Action Party, he served in the Chamber of Deputies from 1985 to 1988.

Tena died on 23 December 2022, at the age of 89.
