= Ginny Redington Dawes =

American songwriter and singer (1945–2022)

- Born: Virginia Redington; May 13, 1945; Brooklyn, New York, U.S.
- Died: December 31, 2022 (aged 77); New York City
- Education: St. Josephs College
- Occupation: Songwriter
- Spouse: Thomas W. Dawes (1975 until his death in 2007)
- Partner: James McCullar

Ginny Redington Dawes (May 13, 1945 – December 31, 2022) was an American songwriter, singer, and author. Best known for the commercial jingles she wrote and co-wrote, including "You, You're the One" (for McDonald's) and "Coke is It" (for Coca-Cola), Dawes also co-wrote two books about antique jewelry and a musical, The Talk of the Town.
