= Ronaldo Veitía =

Cuban judoka (1947–2022)

Ronaldo Veitia Valdivie (21 October 1947 – 5 December 2022) was a Cuban judoka and coach for the country's Olympic judo team.

Veitia was born on 21 October 1947. He led the women's Judo team to multiple Olympic medals, and world championships. Veitia also was responsible for the team winning consecutive gold medals at the Pan Am Games since 1975. His players Dayaris Mestre, Magdiel Estrada, and Idalys Ortiz all won gold for Cuba under him. In fact, he coached his team at six Olympic Games from 1992 to 2012 and obtained five gold, nine silver and ten bronze medals. This made him the coach with the largest amount of Olympic Medals in the history of Judo. In Munich, he held a seminar on how to build a fighting machine. In 30 years he earned 308 international medals for Judo.

Veitia died of complications of diabetes on 5 December 2022, at the age of 75.
