= Jacqueline Rigaud =

French resistant (1925–2022)

- Born: 21 June 1925; Gaillac, France
- Died: 3 December 2022 (aged 97); Albi, France
- Occupation: Resistance activist

Jacqueline Rigaud (21 June 1925 – 3 December 2022) was a French resistant. The daughter of Paul-Raymond and Marie-Louise Rigaud, she took part in the French Resistance.

== Honors ==
- Knight of the Legion of Honour (2007)
- Righteous Among the Nations (1991)
