= Maurice Robert (ethnologist) =

French academic and ethnologist (1930–2022)

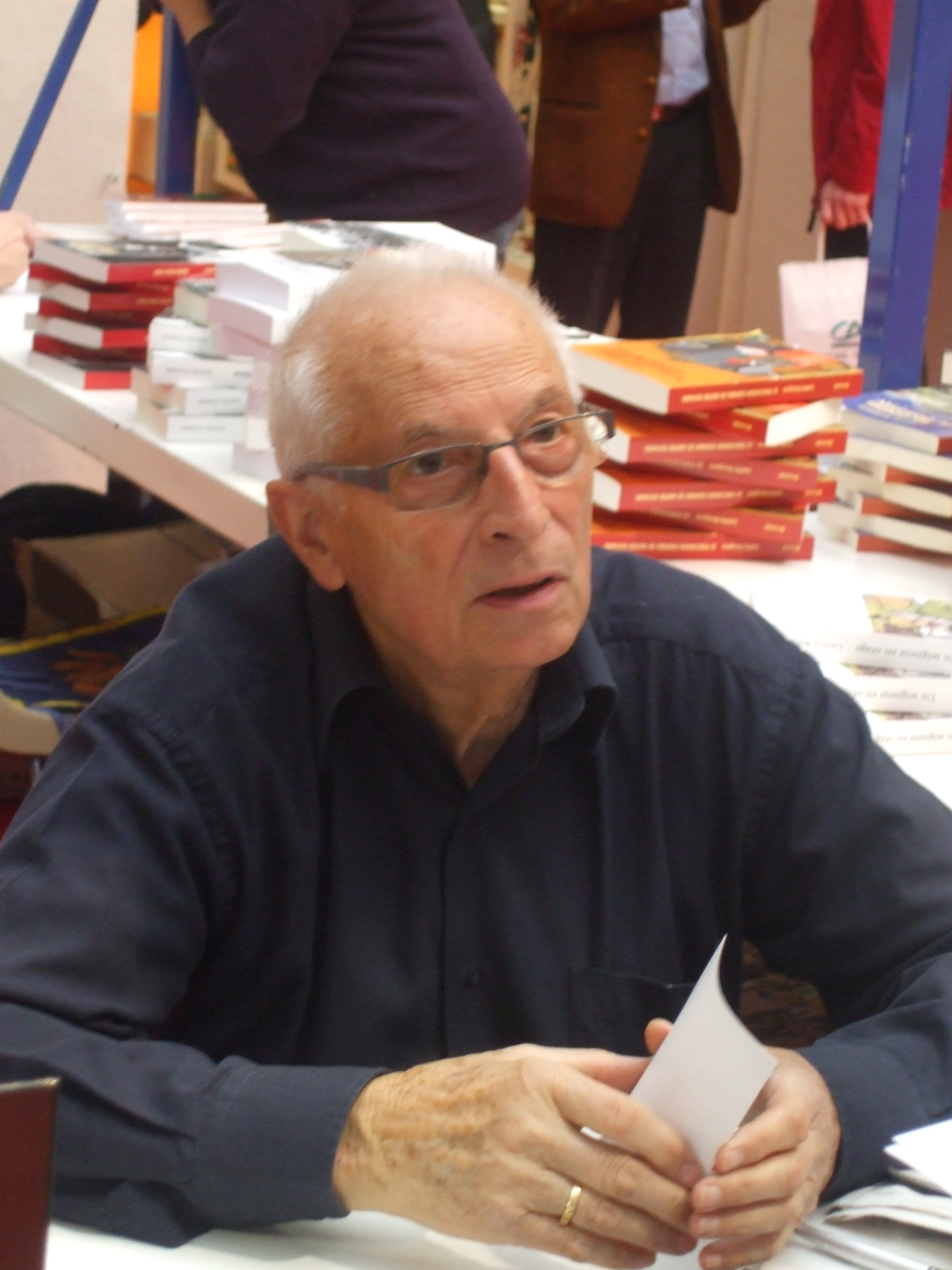
- Robert in 2010
- Born: 21 April 1930; Châlus, France
- Died: 8 December 2022 (aged 92); Limoges, France
- Occupations: Professor; Ethnologist

Maurice Robert (21 April 1930 – 8 December 2022) was a French academic and ethnologist.

== Biography ==
Robert died in Limoges on 8 December 2022, at the age of 92.

== Publications ==
- Vanniers et vannerie du Limousin et de La Marche (with others) (1964)
- Étude d'une communauté artisanale et d'une technique traditionnelle : vanniers et vannerie du Limousin et de la Marche (1967)
- Dictionnaire de la langue limousine, diciounàri de lo lingo limousino (1968)
- Louis dô Limousi, petit paysan du xixe siècle (1972)
- Les poteries populaires et les potiers du Limousin et de la Marche (1972)
- Parler limousin—Parlar limousi (1977)
- Les Limousins des années 30 (1990)
- Études sur la vie politique et les forces électorales en Limousin : 1871-1973
- Les maisons limousines
- Une ville dans son pays : Aubusson hier et aujourd'hui
- Mémoire et identité (1991)
- La maison et le village en Limousin, habitat rural et communauté paysanne (1993)
- Le guide la Haute-Vienne (1995)
- Maisons paysannes d'Auvergne (1992)
- Les mots du Limousin (1997)
- Haute-Vienne (1997)
- L'eau et la lumière, Bourganeuf (1998)
- Les Artisans et les métiers (1999)
- Patrimoine de pays (1999)
- Le pays de Châlus, hier et aujourd'hui (2000)
- La Haute-Vienne, séductions limousines (2000)
- Le Paysan d'autrefois en Limousin (2002)
- Magie, sorcellerie et guérissage en Limousin (2003)
- La Haute-Vienne à tire-d'aile (2003)
- Les Granges (2004)
- Artisans et Métiers en Limousin
- Les mots limousins du village (2007)
- Creuse (2007)
- Pageas en Limousin, Canton de Châlus, Histoire, Patrimoine, Tradition (2007)
- Solignac en Limousin (2007)
- Boire un petit coup... jusqu'à la biture ? (2008)
- La pomme de terre, que d'histoire(s) (2008)
- Le fils du métayer (roman) (2011)
- Retour à la terre-Patrimoine funéraire en Limousin (2012)
- Limousin, corps et âme (2012)
- Petite histoire du Limousin (2014)
- A Dieu ne (dé)plaise (2016)
- Le Limousin entre Abandon et Zizanie (2016)
- Magie, sorcellerie et guérissage en limousin (2017)
- Histoire du Limousin (2018)
- Blagues, proverbes, contes et chansons en Limousin (2019)
- Ce Limousin que j'aime (2021)
