= Greetje den Ouden-Dekkers =

Dutch politician (1940–2022)

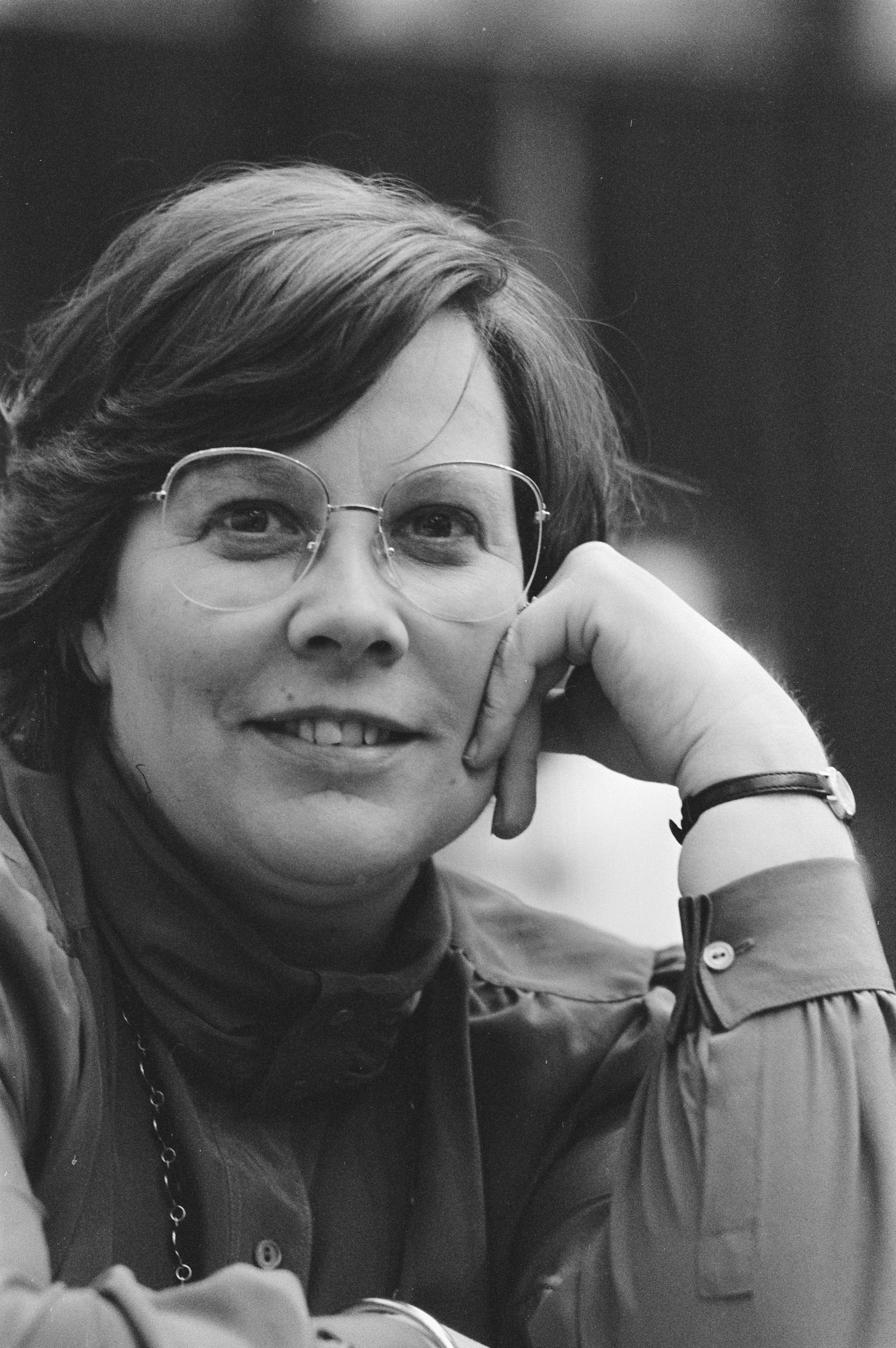
- Ouden-Dekkers in 1985

Member of the House of Representatives of the Netherlands
- In office 16 September 1982 – 3 June 1986

Personal details
- Born: Margarethe Jacoba Huberta den Ouden-Dekkers; 1 January 1940 Bergen op Zoom, Netherlands
- Died: 18 December 2022 (aged 82) Wageningen, Netherlands
- Party: DS'70 (1971–1975); VVD (since 1977)
- Occupation: Teacher

Margarethe Jacoba Huberta "Greetje" den Ouden-Dekkers (1 January 1940 – 18 December 2022) was a Dutch teacher and politician. A member of the People's Party for Freedom and Democracy, she served in the House of Representatives from 1982 to 1986.

From 1989 to 1997 Den Ouden-Dekkers served as chairperson of the Dutch Emancipation Council.

Den Ouden-Dekkers died in Wageningen on 18 December 2022, at the age of 82.
