= Barrington Tabb =

English painter

Barrington Tabb (1934 – 9 December 2022) was an English painter. He was a Royal West of England Academy (RWA) member. Tabb was born in Almondsbury in Gloucestershire, England, and lived his whole life in and around Bristol.

Tabb was entirely self-taught after a short time at art school. He painted the docks, streets, pubs and parks of Bristol.

Several of his paintings are in public collections, including the RWA.

Throughout the 1950s he exhibited at the Clifton Arts Club and in 1976 in Davos, Switzerland. His paintings have been exhibited regularly at the RWA Autumn exhibitions and also with the Bath Society of Artists. He had several solo shows with Anthony Hepworth Fine Art in Bath as well as with the Christopher Hull Gallery and Sue Rankin Galleries in London. In 1997 he had a solo show at the Black Swan Guild in Frome.

Tabb was represented by Cube Gallery in Bristol for many years.
