= Wu Chengkang =

Chinese engineer (1929–2022)

- 吴承康
- Born: 14 November 1929; Shanghai, China
- Died: 25 December 2022 (aged 93); Beijing, China
- Education: Jiaotong University; University of Wisconsin–Madison; Massachusetts Institute of Technology
- Scientific career
- Fields: Gas dynamics
- Workplaces: Institute of Mechanics, Chinese Academy of Sciences

Chinese name
- Simplified Chinese: 吴承康
- Traditional Chinese: 吳承康
Transcriptions
Standard Mandarin
- Hanyu Pinyin: Wú Chéngkāng

Wu Chengkang (Chinese: 吴承康; 14 November 1929 – 25 December 2022) was a Chinese engineer, and an academician of the Chinese Academy of Sciences.

== Biography ==
Wu was born in Shanghai, on 14 November 1929. He attended Nanyang Model High School. In 1947, he entered Jiaotong University, where he majored in the Department of Mechanical Engineering. After completing his master's degree from the University of Wisconsin–Madison in 1952, he entered Massachusetts Institute of Technology where he obtained his doctor's degree in 1957.

Wu returned to China in 1957 and became associate research fellow of the Power Research Office of Chinese Academy of Sciences. In 1970, he was transferred to the 7th Ministry of Machinery Industry, serving until 1978. Since 1978, he successively worked as associate researcher, researcher, director of the Research Room.

On 25 December 2022, Wu died in Beijing, at the age of 93.

== Honours and awards ==
- 1991 Member of the Chinese Academy of Sciences (CAS)
- 1998 State Science and Technology Progress Award (Third Class)
