= René Snelders =

Belgian footballer and businessman (1937–2022)

- Born: 13 October 1937
- Died: 8 December 2022 (aged 85)
- Occupations: Footballer, businessman

René Snelders (13 October 1937 – 8 December 2022) was a Belgian footballer and businessman. He played as a defender.

He played during his career with Beerschot A.C. and Royal Antwerp FC. After his playing career, he was together with his business partner Jos Verhaegen a main person behind the success of Beerschot A.C.. With him as board member the club rose from a provincial football club to the Belgian Pro League in the 1980s. His son was footballer and coach Eddy Snelders and his grandson was footballer Kristof Snelders.

Snelders died in a residential care center on 8 December 2022, at the age of 85.

== Playing career ==
As a player, Snelders defended mainly the colours of Germinal Ekeren. In the early 1960s he also played a handful of matches for Antwerp.

== Administrative career ==
After his playing career, Snelders and his business partner Jos Verhaegen were the driving force behind the rise of Germinal Ekeren, which climbed from provincial football to the top division in the 1980s. After the merger of Germinal Ekeren and Beerschot to form Germinal Beerschot, Snelders was for a time vice-chairman at the Kiel, the stadium in Antwerp. His son Eddy Snelders and his grandson Kristof Snelders were also professional footballers.
