= Daniel Catovsky =

British haematologist (1937–2022)

Daniel Catovsky (19 September 1937 – 2 December 2022) was an Argentine-born British world authority on chronic lymphocytic leukaemia.

Catovsky was born in Buenos Aires, Argentina on 19 September 1937. He died from pneumonia at Chelsea and Westminster Hospital in London, on 2 December 2022, at the age of 85. Catovsky had two sons prior to his death.
