= Germain Anouman Ollo =

Ivorian businessman and politician (1951–2022)

Vice-President of the Senate of Ivory Coast
- In office 10 April 2018 – 28 December 2022

Personal details
- Born: 10 May 1951 Grand-Bassam, French Ivory Coast, French West Africa
- Died: 28 December 2022 (aged 71) Istanbul, Turkey
- Party: RHDP
- Occupation: Businessman

Germain Anouman Ollo (10 May 1951 – 28 December 2022) was an Ivorian businessman and politician.

== Biography ==
In 1975, Ollo earned a degree in civil engineering and became technical director of SOPIM. In this position, he unsuccessfully sought to build the first hotel in Grand-Bassam. As CEO of the SITHO group, he campaigned for the creation of a police force and a bank specializing in tourism. He also served as president of the Association nationale des consultants ivoiriens and executive vice-president of the Fédération des consultants africains.

In 2018, as a member of the Rally of Houphouëtists for Democracy and Peace, Ollo became Vice-President of the Senate. In the Senate, he represented the Sud-Comoé region.

Ollo died in Istanbul on 28 December 2022, at the age of 71.
