= John M. Radosevich =

American politician (1930–2022)

Member of the New Mexico House of Representatives
- In office 1960s–1970s

Personal details
- Born: March 30, 1930 Green Bay, Wisconsin, U.S.
- Died: December 20, 2022 (aged 92)
- Party: Democratic

John M. Radosevich (March 30, 1930 – December 20, 2022) was an American politician. He served as a Democratic member of the New Mexico House of Representatives.
