= Robert Dowling (publisher) =

American publisher (1926–2006)

- Born: September 16, 1939 Long Island, New York
- Died: December 30, 2022 (aged 83) Santa Monica, California
- Area: Publisher
- Notable works: The Hollywood Reporter

Robert Dowling (September 16, 1939 – December 30, 2022) was an American magazine publisher. He was the publisher of The Hollywood Reporter.
