= 2022 in music =

This topic covers events and articles related to 2022 in music.

== Specific locations ==
- African music
- American music
- Asian music
- Australian music
- Brazilian music
- British music
- Canadian music
- Chinese music
- Czech music
- Danish music
- European music
- Finnish music
- French music
- German music
- Icelandic music
- Indonesian music
- Irish music
- Italian music
- Japanese music
- Latin music
- Malaysian music
- Mongolian music
- Nigerian music
- Norwegian music
- Philippine music
- Polynesian music
- Scandinavian music
- South Korean music
- Swedish music
- Taiwanese music
- Vietnamese music

== Specific genres ==
- Afrobeats
- Classical
- Country
- Electronic
- Jazz
- Latin
- Heavy metal
- Hip-hop
- Progressive rock
- Rock
- K-pop
- J-pop

== Awards ==
64th Annual Grammy Awards (USA)
Record of the Year: "Leave the Door Open" by Silk Sonic • Album of the Year: We Are by Jon Batiste • Song of the Year: "Leave the Door Open" by Silk Sonic • Best New Artist: Olivia Rodrigo
2022 Billboard Music Awards (USA)
Top Artist: Drake • Top Male Artist: The Weeknd • Top Female Artist: Olivia Rodrigo • Top New Artist: Olivia Rodrigo • Top Duo/Group: BTS • Top Billboard 200 Album: "Sour" by Olivia Rodrigo • Top Hot 100 Song: "Stay" by The Kid Laroi and Justin Bieber
2022 Brit Awards (UK)
British Album of the Year: 30 by Adele • Best British Song: "Easy On Me" by Adele • British Artist of the Year: Adele • Best New Artist: Little Simz • British Group: Wolf Alice
2022 Juno Awards (Canada)
Artist of the Year: Charlotte Cardin • Group of the Year: Arkells • Album of the Year: "Phoenix" by Charlotte Cardin • Single of the Year: "Meaningless" by Charlotte Cardin
2022 MAMA Awards (Asia)
Artist of the Year: BTS • Album of the Year: Proof by BTS • Song of the Year: "Love Dive" by Ive • Best Music Video: "Pink Venom" by Blackpink
2022 MTV Video Music Awards Japan (Japan)
Video of the Year: "Habit" by Sekai no Owari • Best Solo Artist Video: "Zankyou Sanka" by Aimer and "As It Was" by Harry Styles • Best Group Video: "Mixed Nuts" by Official Hige Dandism and "Pink Venom" by Blackpink • Best New Artist Video: "Rocketeer" by INI and "Supermodel" by Måneskin • Artist of the Year: Vaundy • Song of the Year: "New Genesis" by Ado • Album of the Year: Falling into Your Eyes Record by Aimyon • Group of the Year: Sakurazaka46
2022 MTV Video Music Awards (USA)
Video of the Year: All Too Well: The Short Film by Taylor Swift • Song of the Year: "Happier Than Ever" by Billie Eilish • Artist of the Year: Bad Bunny • Best New Artist: Dove Cameron
2022 MTV Europe Music Awards (Europe)
Best Song: "Super Freaky Girl" by Nicki Minaj • Best Video: All Too Well: The Short Film by Taylor Swift • Best Artist: Taylor Swift • Best New: Seventeen
2022 American Music Awards (USA)
Artist of the Year: Taylor Swift • New Artist of the Year: Dove Cameron • Collaboration of the Year: "Cold Heart (Pnau remix)" by Elton John and Dua Lipa
36th Golden Disc Awards (South Korea)
Album of the Year: Be by BTS • Song of the Year: "Celebrity" by IU • Best Group: Brave Girls • Best Solo Artist: Lim Young-woong
64th Japan Record Awards (Japan)
Grand Prix: "Habit" by Sekai no Owari
Pulitzer Prize for Music (USA)
Voiceless Mass by Raven Chacon
Rock and Roll Hall of Fame (USA)
Performers: Pat Benatar • Duran Duran • Eminem • Eurythmics • Dolly Parton • Lionel Richie • Carly Simon Early influences: Harry Belafonte • Elizabeth Cotten Ahmet Ertegun Award (Non-performers): Allan Grubman • Jimmy Iovine • Sylvia Robinson Award for Musical Excellence: Jimmy Jam and Terry Lewis • Judas Priest
Mercury Prize (UK)
Sometimes I Might Be Introvert by Little Simz
Polar Music Prize (Sweden)
Iggy Pop and Ensemble intercontemporain
Polaris Music Prize (Canada)
José Louis and the Paradox of Love by Pierre Kwenders
Eurovision Song Contest 2022 (Europe)
"Stefania" by Kalush Orchestra (Ukraine)
31st Seoul Music Awards (South Korea)
Grand Prize: NCT 127 • Best Song: "Lilac" by IU • Best Album: Hot Sauce by NCT Dream

== Bands formed ==
- Acid Angel from Asia
- Apink Chobom
- Astro – Jinjin & Rocky
- ATBO
- Blank2y
- Boysgroup
- Brigitte Calls Me Baby
- Classy
- Collar
- CSR
- The Dare
- ExWhyZ
- Fruits Zipper
- Fifty Fifty
- Got the Beat
- H1-Key
- ILY:1
- Irris
- Kep1er
- Lapillus
- The Last Rockstars
- Le Sserafim
- Lolly Talk
- Lil League from Exile Tribe
- L.S. Dunes
- Mamamoo+
- Metamuse
- Mimiirose
- MyGO!!!!!
- NewJeans
- Nmixx
- Ocha Norma
- Psychic Fever from Exile Tribe
- She's Green
- Strayz
- TAN
- Tempest
- TNX
- Travis Japan
- Trendz
- Væb
- Viviz
- XG
- Younite

== Returning Performers ==
- Britney Spears (first song since 2020)

== Soloist debuts ==
- Akari Akase
- Anji Salvacion
- Baekho
- Bailey Zimmerman
- Cent Chihiro Chittiii
- Cho Mi-yeon
- Choi Ye-na
- Cloud Wan
- Eden Golan
- Glaive
- Jeremy Lee
- Jelo The Weirdo
- Kaori Oinuma
- Kayan9896
- Kent Itō
- Kihyun
- Kim Jong-hyeon
- Krystian Wang
- Lauren Spencer-Smith
- Lee Chan-hyuk
- Lil Mabu
- Markus
- Megan Moroney
- Miyeon
- Nayeon
- Phoebus Ng
- SennaRin
- Seulgi
- Shanaia Gomez
- Wonpil
- Xiumin
- Yerin
- Yoshino Aoyama
- Yuju
- Yuki Yomichi
- Jaimin

== Bands reformed ==
- The Academy Is...
- Be Your Own Pet
- Big Bang
- The Blackout
- Bluebottle Kiss
- Coal Chamber
- DNCE
- Doping Panda
- EXID
- The Gaslight Anthem
- Get Scared
- Girls' Generation
- Hanoi Rocks
- Kara
- Kisschasy
- The Mars Volta
- Mötley Crüe
- Mrs. Green Apple
- Pantera
- Pavement
- Pink Floyd (a one off recording, "Hey, Hey, Rise Up!", in aid of Ukrainian Humanitarian relief, following the Russian invasion of Ukraine)
- Pity Sex
- The Prodigy
- Pulp
- Rival Schools
- Roxy Music
- Sleep
- Sunk Loto
- Sunny Day Real Estate
- TISM
- Unwound
- Yellowcard
- t.A.T.u.

== Bands disbanded ==
- April
- Aswad
- Brutality Will Prevail
- The Birds of Satan
- Botopass
- Bvndit
- BugAboo
- blessthefall
- Castanets
- CLC
- D-Crunch
- DEL48
- The Delfonics
- The Detroit Cobras
- Empire
- Every Time I Die
- Gauze
- Genesis
- The Ghost of Paul Revere
- Girlkind
- Girlpool
- The Golden Palominos
- Go to the Beds
- Grim Reaper
- Ho6la
- Hot Issue
- The Judds
- Kids See Ghosts
- Kikagaku Moyo
- The Linda Lindas
- Low Roar
- Lunarsolar
- mewithoutYou
- The Mighty Mighty Bosstones
- Mighty Diamonds
- Migos
- MVP
- Neverland Express
- Noisia
- NU'EST
- Okilly Dokilly
- Predia
- Press to Meco
- Procol Harum
- Pupy y Los que Son, Son
- The Pussycat Dolls
- Redsquare
- Roberts and Barrand
- The Saints
- The Shadows of Knight
- Summer Camp
- Super Girls
- Supergrass
- Sweet Trip
- Taylor Hawkins and the Coattail Riders
- Torche
- TRCNG
- Whitesnake
- Waterson:Carthy
- We Girls
- Why Don't We
- With Confidence
- Wisin & Yandel

== Bands on hiatus ==
- Brockhampton
- BTS
- Circa Survive
- DIA
- Florida Georgia Line
- Keane
- Laboum
- Little Mix
- Lovelyz
- Mary's Blood
- The Peggies
- Violent Soho
- Yoshimotozaka46

== Deaths ==
=== January ===
- 1 – Mighty Bomber, 93, Trinidadian calypso singer
- 2
  - Ana Bejerano, 60, Spanish pop singer (Mocedades)
  - Kenny J, 69, Trinidadian calypso and soca singer
  - Traxamillion, 42, American hip hop producer
  - Jay Weaver, 42, American Christian rock bassist (Big Daddy Weave)
- 3 – Lewis Jordan, 74, American pop guitarist and singer (The Jordan Brothers)
- 4
  - Jessie Daniels, 58, American R&B singer (Force MDs)
  - Andrzej Nowak, 63, Polish heavy metal guitarist (TSA)
- 5
  - Dale Clevenger, 81, American classical French hornist
  - Neil Nongkynrih, 51, Indian classical pianist
- 6
  - Carlo Meliciani, 92, Italian opera singer
  - Calvin Simon, 79, American funk singer (Parliament-Funkadelic)
  - Yoram Taharlev, 83, Israeli pop lyricist
- 7
  - Harpdog Brown, 59, Canadian blues singer and harmonica player
  - Koady Chaisson, 37, Canadian folk banjoist (The East Pointers)
  - Bobby Harrison, 82, British psychedelic rock drummer and singer (Procol Harum, Freedom, Snafu)
  - Marc Dé Hugar, 52, Australian glam metal guitarist (Candy Harlots)
  - R. Dean Taylor, 82, Canadian pop singer-songwriter
- 8
  - Marilyn Bergman, 93, American pop lyricist
  - Ramdas Kamat, 90, Indian Marathi theatre singer
  - Michael Lang, 77, American tour promoter and producer
- 9
  - Maria Ewing, 71, American opera singer
  - James Mtume, 76, American jazz and R&B multi-instrumentalist (Mtume)
  - Desmond de Silva, 78, Sri Lankan pop and baila singer
- 10
  - Gerry Granahan, 89, American rock and roll and pop singer-songwriter
  - Francis Jackson, 104, British classical organist and composer
  - Khan Jamal, 75, American jazz vibraphonist
  - Burke Shelley, 71, British heavy metal singer and bassist (Budgie)
- 11
  - Bruce Anderson, 72, American experimental rock guitarist (MX-80)
  - Martin Carrizo, 50, Argentine rock and heavy metal drummer (A.N.I.M.A.L., Indio Solari)
  - Rosa Lee Hawkins, 76, American pop and R&B singer (The Dixie Cups)
  - Jordi Sabatés, 73, Spanish sunshine pop and classical pianist (Pic-Nic)
- 12
  - Everett Lee, 105, American classical violinist and conductor
  - Waiphot Phetsuphan, 79, Thai Luk Thung singer
  - Ronnie Spector, 78, American R&B and pop singer (The Ronettes)
- 13
  - CPO Boss Hogg, 52, American rapper
  - Fred Parris, 85, American doo-wop singer and songwriter (The Five Satins)
  - Sonny Turner, 82, American R&B singer (The Platters)
  - Fred Van Hove, 84, Belgian free jazz pianist
- 14
  - Dallas Frazier, 82, American country singer-songwriter
  - Greg Webster, 84, American funk drummer (Ohio Players)
- 15
  - Ralph Emery, 88, American radio disc jockey
  - Jon Lind, 73, American folk rock and pop singer-songwriter and guitarist (Howdy Moon)
  - Rachel Nagy, 48, American blues rock singer (The Detroit Cobras)
  - Beverly Ross, 87, American pop singer-songwriter (Ronald & Ruby)
- 16 – Carmela Corren, 83, Israeli-Austrian pop singer
- 17 – Armando Gama, 67, Portuguese pop singer
- 18
  - Dick Halligan, 78, American jazz rock multi-instrumentalist (Blood, Sweat & Tears) and film composer
  - Freddie Hughes, 78, American gospel and soul singer
  - Tito Matos, 53, American bomba percussionist (Viento de Agua)
- 19 – Badal Roy, 82, Indian-American jazz fusion tabla player
- 20
  - Meat Loaf, 74, American rock singer
  - Tom Smith, 65, American experimental rock multi-instrumentalist (To Live and Shave in L.A., Peach of Immortality)
  - Elza Soares, 91, Brazilian samba and bossa nova singer
  - Karolos Trikolidis, 74, Austrian classical conductor
- 21 – Terry Tolkin, 62, American music journalist and music executive (Elektra Records), coined the term "alternative music"
- 22
  - Kirti Shiledar, 69, Indian classical singer
  - Don Wilson, 88, American surf rock guitarist (The Ventures)
- 23 – Beegie Adair, 84, American jazz pianist
- 24
  - Osvaldo Peredo, 91, Argentine tango singer
  - Boris Pfeiffer, 53, German folk metal multi-instrumentalist (In Extremo)
- 25
  - Hardev Dilgir, 82, Indian folk lyricist
  - Andy Ross, 66, British punk rock singer and guitarist (Disco Zombies) and music executive (Food Records)
  - Pat King, 77–78, Scottish progressive rock bassist (Manfred Mann's Earth Band)
- 26 – Janet Mead, 84, Australian Christian music singer
- 27
  - Alain Bancquart, 87, French classical composer
  - Diego Verdaguer, 70, Argentine-Mexican pop singer
- 29 – Sam Lay, 86, American blues drummer (The Paul Butterfield Blues Band)
- 30
  - Jon Appleton, 83, American electronic composer, co-inventor of the Synclavier
  - Philip Paul, 96, American jazz, blues, and R&B drummer
  - Hargus "Pig" Robbins, 84, American country and rock pianist
  - Norma Waterson, 82, British folk singer (The Watersons)
- 31
  - Alejandro Alonso, 69, Mexican Christian rock guitarist
  - Jimmy Johnson, 93, American blues guitarist
  - Trey Johnson, 53, American rock singer and guitarist (Sorta)

=== February ===
- 1
  - Hiroshima, Japanese hardcore punk drummer (GISM)
  - Glenn Wheatley, 74, Australian rock bassist (The Masters Apprentices)
  - Leslie Parnas, 90, American classical cellist
  - Jon Zazula, 59, American record executive (Megaforce Records)
- 2
  - Endo Anaconda, 66, Swiss pop singer-songwriter (Stiller Has)
  - Joe Diorio, 85, American jazz guitarist
  - Willie Leacox, 74, American folk rock drummer (America)
- 3 – Donny Gerrard, 75, Canadian pop rock singer (Skylark)
- 4
  - Kerry Chater, 76, Canadian rock bassist and songwriter (Gary Puckett & The Union Gap)
  - Gianluca Floris, 57, Italian opera singer
- 5
  - Rubén Fuentes, 95, Mexican classical and mariachi violinist
  - Damodar Hota, 86, Indian classical singer
- 6
  - George Crumb, 92, American classical composer
  - Syl Johnson, 85, American blues guitarist
  - Lata Mangeshkar, 92, Indian playback singer
- 7 – Zbigniew Namysłowski, 82, Polish jazz multi-instrumentalist
- 8 – Bruce Greig, 54, American death metal guitarist (Misery Index, Dying Fetus)
- 9
  - Betty Davis, 77, American funk singer
  - Ian McDonald, 75, British progressive rock multi-instrumentalist (King Crimson, Foreigner)
  - Nora Nova, 93, Bulgarian pop singer
- 10
  - Walter Barylli, 100, Austrian classical violinist
  - Brian Dunning, 71, Irish classical and Celtic flautist (Nightnoise)
  - Roman Kostrzewski, 61, Polish thrash metal singer (Kat)
  - Owen Moran, 62, British new wave bassist (Cook da Books)
  - Steve Salas, 70, American Latin musician (El Chicano, Tierra)
- 11 – Mike Rabon, 78, American rock singer and guitarist (The Five Americans)
- 12
  - Miguel Vicens Danus, 78, Spanish pop-rock bassist (Los Bravos)
  - Howard Grimes, 80, American soul drummer (Hi Rhythm Section)
  - Bob DeMeo, 66, American jazz drummer
- 13 – King Louie Bankston, 49, American power pop and garage rock singer-songwriter and guitarist (The Exploding Hearts)
- 14
  - Ralf Bursy, 66, German pop singer
  - Sandy Nelson, 83, American rock and roll drummer
  - Roger Segal, 49, American punk rock bassist (Trashlight Vision)
- 15
  - Bappi Lahiri, 69, Indian disco singer and composer
  - Sandhya Mukherjee, 90, Indian playback singer
  - Vivi l'internationale, 75, Beninese pop singer
- 16 – Ramón Stagnaro, 67, Peruvian folk guitarist
- 17
  - Dallas Good, 48, Canadian rock singer and guitarist (The Sadies)
  - David Tyson, 62, American R&B singer (The Manhattans)
- 18
  - Christopher Scicluna, 62, Maltese pop singer-songwriter (Chris and Moira)
  - Scotty Wray, 64, American country guitarist (The Wrays)
- 19
  - Gary Brooker, 76, British progressive rock singer-songwriter and keyboardist (Procol Harum, The Paramounts, Ringo Starr & His All-Starr Band)
  - Nightbirde, 31, American pop singer
- 20
  - Sami Clark, 73, Lebanese pop singer
  - Jamal Edwards, 31, British music entrepreneur and DJ
  - Sam Henry, 65, American punk drummer (Wipers, The Rats, Napalm Beach)
  - Joni James, 91, American pop singer
  - Nils Lindberg, 88, Swedish classical composer and pianist
  - Teruhiko Saigō, 75, Japanese pop singer
  - Setha Sirichaya, 77, Thai rock singer (The Impossibles)
  - Martin Yeritsyan, 90, Armenian classical violinist
- 21 – Bernardas Vasiliauskas, 83, Lithuanian classical organist
- 22
  - Muvaffak "Maffy" Falay, 92, Turkish jazz trumpeter (Kenny Clarke/Francy Boland Big Band)
  - Mark Lanegan, 57, American alternative rock singer-songwriter (Screaming Trees, The Gutter Twins, Queens of the Stone Age)
  - Josephine Veasey, 91, British opera singer
- 23
  - Carlos Barbosa-Lima, 77, Brazilian jazz and classical guitarist
  - Jayananda Lama, 65, Nepali folk singer
  - Jaakko Kuusisto, 48, Finnish classical violinist
  - Riky Rick, 34, South African rapper
  - Antonietta Stella, 92, Italian opera singer
- 24 – Don Craine, 76, British R&B singer and guitarist (Downliners Sect)
- 25
  - Alibaba Mammadov, 93, Azerbaijani mugham singer
  - MC Skibadee, 46, British rapper
  - Nicky Tesco, 66, British punk rock singer (The Members)
- 26 – Snootie Wild, 36, American rapper

=== March ===
- 1
  - Warner Mack, 86, American country singer-songwriter
  - Richard Pratt, 69, American R&B singer (Blue Magic)
- 2 – Chuck Criss, 36, American indie folk multi-instrumentalist (Freelance Whales)
- 3 – Denroy Morgan, Jamaican-American reggae singer
- 4 – Jimbeau Hinson, 70, American country singer-songwriter
- 5
  - Patricio Renán, 77, Chilean pop rock singer
  - Jeff Howell, 60, American rock bassist (Foghat, Outlaws, Savoy Brown)
  - Lil Bo Weep, 22, American and Australian rapper
- 6
  - Mike Cross, 57, American alternative rock guitarist (Sponge)
  - Pau Riba i Romeva, 73, Spanish folk rock guitarist
- 8
  - John Dean, 80, American blue-eyed soul singer (The Reflections)
  - Grandpa Elliott, 77, American soul and blues singer and harmonica player
  - Ziggy Sigmund, Canadian punk and alternative rock guitarist (Slow, Econoline Crush)
  - Isao Suzuki, 89, Japanese jazz bassist
- 9 – Richard Podolor, 86, American rock and roll guitarist (The Pets) and record producer
- 10
  - Bobbie Nelson, 91, American country pianist (The Family)
  - Gennadiy Pavlik, 52, Ukrainian classical and traditional folk singer (Veryovka Ukrainian Folk Choir)
  - Jessica Williams, 73, American jazz pianist
- 11
  - Guayo Cedeño, 48, Honduran rock singer
  - Brad Martin, 48, American country singer
  - Timmy Thomas, 77, American soul singer
- 12
  - Barry Bailey, 73, American rock guitarist (Atlanta Rhythm Section)
  - Traci Braxton, 50, American R&B singer (The Braxtons)
  - Kandikonda, 48, Indian film lyricist
  - Pete St. John, 90, Irish folk singer-songwriter
- 13
  - Li Guangxi, 92, Chinese opera singer
  - Mary Lee, 100, Scottish jazz singer
- 14 – Eric Mercury, 77, Canadian R&B singer
- 15
  - Dennis González, 67, American free jazz trumpeter
  - Barbara Maier Gustern, 82, American vocal coach and musical theater singer
- 16
  - Barbara Morrison, 72, American jazz singer
  - Bobby Weinstein, 92, American pop songwriter
- 18 – Bernabé Martí, 93, Spanish opera singer
- 19 – Michail Jurowski, 76, Russian classical conductor
- 21 – LaShun Pace, 60, American gospel singer
- 22
  - Eva Castillo, 52, Filipino pop singer
  - Pierre Papadiamandis, 85, French pop pianist and singer
- 23 – Zinaida Ignatyeva, 84, Russian classical pianist
- 24
  - Randy Cornor, 67, American country singer-songwriter and guitarist
  - John McLeod, 88, Scottish classical composer
- 25
  - Taylor Hawkins, 50, American alternative rock drummer (Foo Fighters, Taylor Hawkins and the Coattail Riders)
  - Bobby Hendricks, 84, American R&B singer (The Drifters)
  - Philip Jeck, 69, British avant garde and electronic composer and turntablist
  - Keith Martin, 55, American R&B singer
- 26
  - Jeff Carson, 58, American country singer
  - Bang Jun-seok, 51, South Korean film composer
  - Tina May, 60, British jazz singer
  - Keaton Pierce, 31, American post-hardcore singer (Too Close to Touch)
- 28 – Mira Calix, South African electronic composer
- 29
  - Irini Konitopoulou-Legaki, 90, Greek folk singer
  - Jun Lopito, 64, Filipino rock guitarist
  - Donald "Tabby" Shaw, 66, Jamaican reggae singer (Mighty Diamonds)
- 30
  - Francisco González, 68, American Chicano rock mandolinist and harpist (Los Lobos)
  - Tom Parker, 33, British pop singer (The Wanted)
  - Nathaniel Ian Wynter, 66, Jamaican reggae keyboardist (Bob Marley and the Wailers)
- 31 – Fred Johnson, 80, American doo-wop singer (The Marcels)

=== April ===
- 1
  - C. W. McCall, 93, American country singer
  - Fitzroy "Bunny" Simpson, 70, Jamaican reggae singer (Mighty Diamonds)
  - Roland White, 83, American bluegrass mandolinist (Kentucky Colonels, Nashville Bluegrass Band, Country Gazette)
- 4 – Joe Messina, 93, American R&B guitarist
- 5
  - Bobby Rydell, 79, American rock and roll singer
  - Paul Siebel, 84, American country rock singer-songwriter and guitarist
- 6
  - Helen Golden, 81, Dutch pop singer
  - Wen Hsia, 93, Taiwanese pop singer
- 7 – Birgit Nordin, 88, Swedish opera singer
- 8
  - Wade Buff, 87, American pop singer (The Dream Weavers)
  - Con Cluskey, Irish pop musician (The Bachelors)
  - Nagai Sriram, 41, Indian Carnatic violinist
- 9
  - Chris Bailey, 65, Kenyan-born Australian punk rock singer-songwriter and guitarist (The Saints)
  - John Rossi, American blues rock drummer (Roomful of Blues)
- 10 – Mario Martínez, Spanish new wave guitarist (La Unión)
- 12
  - David Freel, 64, American indie rock singer and guitarist (Swell)
  - Charles E. McCormick, 75, American R&B singer (Bloodstone)
- 13
  - Archie Eversole, 37, German-born American rapper
  - Tim Feerick, American post-hardcore bassist (Dance Gavin Dance)
  - Gloria Parker, 100, American jazz marimba and glass harp player
- 14
  - Orlando Julius, 79, Nigerian afrobeat saxophonist
  - Trygve Thue, 71, Norwegian rock guitarist
- 16 – Bill Bourne, 68, Canadian folk rock singer-songwriter (Tri-Continental)
- 17
  - Roderick Clark, 49, American R&B singer (Hi-Five)
  - Prafulla Kar, 83, Indian playback singer
  - DJ Kay Slay, 55, American hip hop disc jockey
  - Radu Lupu, 76, Romanian classical pianist
  - Hollis Resnik, 67, American musical theater singer and actress
- 18
  - Nicholas Angelich, 51, American classical pianist
  - Harrison Birtwistle, 87, British classical composer
  - José Luis Cortés, 70, Cuban timba flutist (NG La Banda)
  - Jerry Doucette, 70, Canadian singer-songwriter and guitarist
  - Andrzej Korzyński, 82, Polish classical composer
  - Janez Matičič, 95, Slovenian classical composer
- 20 – Guitar Shorty, 89, American blues guitarist
- 22 – Jan Rot, 64, Dutch pop singer-songwriter
- 23 – Arno, 72, Belgian rock singer (TC Matic)
- 24
  - Willi Resetarits, 73, Austrian cabaret singer
  - Andrew Woolfolk, 71, American R&B saxophonist (Earth, Wind & Fire)
- 25
  - Susan Jacks, 73, Canadian pop singer-songwriter (The Poppy Family) and record producer
  - Henny Vrienten, 73, Dutch ska singer-songwriter and bassist (Doe Maar)
  - Shane Yellowbird, 42, Canadian country singer
- 26
  - Julie Daraîche, 83, Canadian country singer
  - Randy Rand, American hard rock bassist (Autograph)
  - Klaus Schulze, 74, German electronic keyboardist and synthesizer player (Tangerine Dream, Ash Ra Tempel)
- 27
  - Judy Henske, 85, American folk singer-songwriter
  - Walter Rossi, 74, Italian-Canadian rock singer and guitarist (Influence, Luke & The Apostles)
- 29
  - Allen Blairman, 81, American jazz drummer
  - Roberto Lecaros, 77, Brazilian jazz multi-instrumentalist
  - Tarsame Singh Saini, 54, British Asian fusion singer
- 30
  - Ray Fenwick, 75, British rock guitarist (The Syndicats, The Spencer Davis Group, Ian Gillan Band)
  - Naomi Judd, 76, American country singer (The Judds)
  - Max Riebl, 30, Australian opera singer
  - Gabe Serbian, American hardcore punk guitarist and drummer (The Locust, Dead Cross)

=== May ===
- 1
  - Ric Parnell, 70, British hard rock drummer (Atomic Rooster, Spinal Tap)
  - Régine Zylberberg, 92, Belgian torch singer
- 2 – María José Cantilo, 68, Argentine folk singer-songwriter
- 4
  - Richard Connolly, 94, Australian television and liturgical composer
  - Albin Julius, 54, Austrian martial industrial multi-instrumentalist (Der Blutharsch, The Moon Lay Hidden Beneath a Cloud)
  - Howie Pyro, 61, American punk rock bassist (D Generation, Danzig)
- 6 – Jewell, 53, American R&B singer
- 7 – Mickey Gilley, 86, American country singer-songwriter
- 9 – Minoru Nojima, 76, Japanese classical pianist
- 10
  - Richard Benson, 41, British progressive rock guitarist and singer-songwriter
  - Doug Caldwell, 94, New Zealand jazz pianist
  - Kjell Lönnå, 85, Swedish classical composer and choir leader
  - Shivkumar Sharma, 84, Indian classical santoor player (Shiv–Hari)
- 11
  - William Bennett, 86, British classical flautist
  - Trevor Strnad, 41, American melodic death metal singer (The Black Dahlia Murder)
  - Alexander Toradze, 69, Georgian-born American classical pianist
- 12
  - Djalu Gurruwiwi, 86, Aboriginal Australian traditional yiḏaki player
  - Ben Moore, 80, American soul and gospel singer (James & Bobby Purify, The Blind Boys of Alabama)
- 13
  - Teresa Berganza, 89, Spanish opera singer
  - Lil Keed, 24, American rapper
  - Rosmarie Trapp, 93, Austrian-born American choral singer (Trapp Family)
- 14 – Robert Cogoi, 82, Belgian pop singer
- 15
  - Deborah Fraser, 56, South African gospel singer
  - Ricky Gardiner, 73, Scottish rock guitarist (Beggars Opera)
- 17
  - Rick Price, 77, British rock bassist (The Move, Wizzard)
  - Vangelis, 79, Greek progressive rock and ambient keyboardist (Aphrodite's Child) and film composer
- 18
  - Cathal Coughlan, 61, Irish indie rock singer-songwriter (Microdisney, The Fatima Mansions)
  - Bob Neuwirth, 82, American singer-songwriter
- 19 – Bernard Wright, 58, American jazz and funk singer and keyboardist
- 21 – Yam Bing-yee, 90, Chinese opera singer
- 23 – Thom Bresh, 74, American country singer
- 25 – Jean-Louis Chautemps, 90, French jazz saxophonist
- 26
  - Andy Fletcher, 60, British new wave and alternative rock keyboardist (Depeche Mode)
  - Alan White, 72, British progressive rock drummer (Yes, Plastic Ono Band)
- 29
  - Steve Broughton, 72, British psychedelic rock drummer (Edgar Broughton Band)
  - Ronnie Hawkins, 87, American-Canadian rock and roll singer
  - Sidhu Moose Wala, 28, Indian rapper and singer
- 30 – Paul Vance, 92, American pop songwriter
- 31
  - KK, 53, Indian playback singer
  - Ingram Marshall, 80, American classical composer
  - Kelly Joe Phelps, 62, American blues singer-songwriter and slide guitarist
  - Dave Smith, American sound engineer, founder of Sequential, and co-creator of the Prophet-5

=== June ===
- 1 – Deborah McCrary, 67, American gospel singer (The McCrary Sisters)
- 2
  - Hal Bynum, 87, American country songwriter
  - Gracia Montes, 86, Spanish cobla singer
  - Bhajan Sopori, Indian classical santoor player
- 3
  - El Noba, 25, Argentine cumbia singer
  - Grachan Moncur III, 85, American jazz trombonist
- 4
  - Alec John Such, 70, American hard rock bassist (Bon Jovi)
  - Trouble, 34, American rapper
- 6 – Jim Seals, 79, American soft rock singer-songwriter (The Champs, Seals and Crofts)
- 9
  - Commander Tom, 59, German house and trance disc jockey
  - Julee Cruise, 65, American dream pop singer-songwriter
- 11 – Amb Osayomore Joseph, 69, Nigerian highlife singer-songwriter
- 12
  - Gabe Baltazar, 92, American jazz saxophonist
  - Roman Bunka, 70, German jazz fusion guitarist and oud player
- 14 – Joel Whitburn, 82, American Billboard charts historian
- 16
  - Big Rude Jake, 57, Canadian neo-swing singer-songwriter and bandleader
  - Ivonne Haza, 83, Dominican opera singer
  - Rino Vernizzi, 75, Italian jazz and classical bassoonist
- 18 – Adibah Noor, 51, Malaysian pop singer
- 19
  - Jim Schwall, 79, American blues singer-songwriter and guitarist (Siegel–Schwall Band)
  - Brett Tuggle, American rock keyboardist (Fleetwood Mac, Steppenwolf)
- 20 – Dennis Cahill, 68, American Irish folk guitarist (The Gloaming)
- 21 – Lewis Elliott, 84, American bassist (J. Frank Wilson and the Cavaliers)
- 22 – Patrick Adams, 72, American disco arranger and producer (The Universal Robot Band, Musique)
- 23
  - Massimo Morante, 70, Italian progressive rock guitarist (Goblin)
  - Yuri Shatunov, 48, Russian pop rock singer (Laskovyi Mai)
  - Leluț Vasilescu, 66, Romanian rock drummer

=== July ===
- 1 – Irene Fargo, 59, Italian pop and theater singer
- 2 – Tristan Goodall, 48, Australian blues guitarist (The Audreys)
- 3
  - Miu Chu, 40, Taiwanese pop singer
  - Antonio Cripezzi, 76, Italian pop singer and keyboardist (I Camaleonti)
- 4 – Alan Blaikley, 82, British pop songwriter
- 5 – Manny Charlton, 80, Scottish hard rock guitarist (Nazareth)
- 7 – Adam Wade, 87, American pop singer
- 8 – Alam Khan, 78, Bangladeshi film composer
- 9 – Barbara Thompson, 77, British jazz saxophonist (Colosseum, United Jazz + Rock Ensemble)
- 10
  - Andrew Ball, 72, British classical pianist
  - Chantal Gallia, 65, Algerian-born French pop singer and humorist
- 11 – Monty Norman, 92, British film composer
- 12
  - Bramwell Tovey, 69, British classical conductor and composer
  - Jan Wijn, 88, Dutch classical pianist
- 13
  - A. B. Crentsil, 72, Ghanaian highlife guitarist
  - Rubina Qureshi, 81, Pakistani classical singer
- 14 – William Hart, 77, American R&B singer (The Delfonics)
- 15 – Paul Ryder, 58, English alternative dance bassist (Happy Mondays)
- 16 – Idris Phillips, 64, American jazz and folk pianist and guitarist
- 17 – César Pedroso, 75, Cuban songo and timba pianist (Los Van Van, Pupy y Los que Son, Son)
- 18
  - Vincent DeRosa, 101, American classical French hornist
  - Povl Dissing, 84, Danish pop singer and guitarist
  - Bhupinder Singh, 82, Indian ghazal and playback singer
- 19
  - Michael Henderson, 71, American jazz fusion bassist and R&B singer
  - Q Lazzarus, 59, American new wave singer
  - Richard Seal, 86, British classical organist and conductor
- 20
  - Alice Harnoncourt, 91, Austrian classical violinist
  - Richard Harvey, Australian rock drummer (Divinyls, The Party Boys, Joe Walsh)
  - Frederick Waite Jr., 55, English reggae drummer (Musical Youth)
- 22
  - Núria Feliu, 80, Spanish jazz and folk singer
  - Kenichi Ōkuma, 56, Japanese video game music composer
- 23
  - Mike Pela, 72, British record producer and mixing engineer
  - Zayar Thaw, 41, Burmese rapper (Acid)
- 24
  - Vittorio De Scalzi, 72, Italian progressive rock singer and guitarist (New Trolls)
  - Bob Heathcote, 58, American crossover thrash bassist (Suicidal Tendencies)
- 25
  - Martin How, 90, British classical organist and composer
  - Sandy Roberton, British record producer
- 26 – Darío Gómez, 71, Colombian pop and ranchera singer
- 27
  - JayDaYoungan, 24, American rapper
  - Mick Moloney, 77, Irish-American folk singer and folklorist
  - Tom Springfield, 88, British folk pop singer-songwriter (The Springfields)
- 28 – Bernard Cribbins, 93, English pop singer and actor
- 29 – Jim Sohns, 75, American rock singer (The Shadows of Knight)
- 30
  - Archie Roach, 66, Australian folk singer-songwriter
  - Raymond Raposa, American psychedelic folk singer-songwriter (Castanets)
- 31
  - Nirmala Mishra, 83, Indian playback singer
  - Mo Ostin, 95, American record executive

=== August ===
- 1 – Rosa de Castilla, 90, Mexican ranchera singer
- 3 – Nicky Moore, 75, British heavy metal singer (Samson)
- 4
  - Sam Gooden, 87, American soul singer (The Impressions)
  - Ray Major, 73, British rock guitarist (Mott, British Lions, The Yardbirds)
- 5
  - Judith Durham, 79, Australian pop-folk singer (The Seekers)
  - Michael Lang, 80, American jazz and classical pianist
- 6
  - Daniel Lévi, 60, French pop singer-songwriter
  - David Muse, 73, American country rock flautist, keyboardist and saxophonist (Firefall, The Marshall Tucker Band)
  - Torgny Söderberg, 77, Swedish schlanger songwriter
- 7
  - Ernesto Cavour, 82, Bolivian folk singer (Los Jairas)
  - Gord Lewis, 65, Canadian punk rock guitarist (Teenage Head)
- 8
  - Lamont Dozier, 81, American songwriter and record producer (Holland–Dozier–Holland) and singer
  - Darryl Hunt, 72, English folk punk bassist (The Pogues)
  - Olivia Newton-John, 73, Australian pop and country singer-songwriter
- 9 – Jussi Hakulinen, 57, Finnish pop rock singer-songwriter and keyboardist (Yö)
- 10 – Abdul Wadud, 75, American jazz and classical cellist
- 11
  - Darius Campbell Danesh, 41, Scottish pop singer
  - Mohamed Huzam, 52, Maldivian playback singer
  - Bill Pitman, 102, American jazz, pop, and rock guitarist (The Wrecking Crew)
  - Shimoga Subbanna, 83, Indian playback singer
- 12 – Ebrahim Ghanbari Mehr, 94, Iranian musical instrument maker
- 14 – Svika Pick, 72, Israeli songwriter
- 15
  - Steve Grimmett, 62, English heavy metal singer (Grim Reaper, Onslaught, Lionsheart).
  - Hans Magnusson, 73, Swedish dansband saxophonist (Thorleifs)
  - Tokollo Tshabalala, 45, South African kwaito singer-songwriter (TKZee)
- 16
  - Kal David, 79, American blues singer and guitarist
  - Matti Lehtinen, 100, Finnish opera singer
- 18 – Rolf Kühn, 92, German jazz clarinetist and saxophonist
- 19 – Ted Kirkpatrick, 62, American Christian thrash metal drummer and songwriter (Tourniquet)
- 20
  - Helen Grayco, 97, American pop singer
  - Nayyara Noor, 71, Pakistani playback and ghazal singer
  - Paul Tesluk, 82, American rock and roll organist (Johnny and the Hurricanes)
- 21 – Monnette Sudler, 70, American jazz guitarist
- 22
  - Jerry Allison, 82, American rock and roll drummer and songwriter (The Crickets), and singer
  - Stuart Anstis, 48, British extreme metal guitarist (Cradle of Filth)
  - Jaimie Branch, 39, American free jazz trumpeter and composer
  - Fredy Studer, 72, Swizz jazz fusion drummer
  - Piotr Szkudelski, 66, Polish rock drummer (Perfect)
  - Margaret Urlich, 57, New Zealand pop singer
- 23 – Creed Taylor, 93, American jazz trumpeter, record producer and music executive
- 25
  - Joey DeFrancesco, 51, American jazz organist, saxophonist and trumpeter
  - Mable John, 91, American R&B singer (The Raelettes)
- 26 – Hana Zagorová, 75, Czech pop singer
- 27
  - Georges Al Rassi, 42, Lebanese Khaliji singer
  - Manolo Sanlúcar, 78, Spanish flamenco guitarist
- 29
  - Luke Bell, 32, American country singer
  - John P. Varkey, 52, Indian alternative rock guitarist (Avial) and film composer
- 31 – Mark Shreeve, 65, British electronic composer and synthesizer player (Redshift)

=== September ===
- 1 – Bamba Bakya, 49, Indian playback singer
- 2
  - Jordi Cervelló, 86, Spanish classical composer
  - Drummie Zeb, 62, British reggae drummer and singer (Aswad)
- 4
  - Wes Freed, 58, American artist and album cover designer (Drive-By Truckers, Lauren Hoffman)
  - Edward Hulewicz, 84, Polish pop singer
  - John Till, 76, Canadian blues rock guitarist (Full Tilt Boogie Band, The Revols)
- 5 – Lars Vogt, 51, German classical composer
- 7
  - Jimbo Doares, 78, American rock and roll guitarist (The Swingin' Medallions)
  - Dave Sherman, 55, American doom metal bassist and singer (Spirit Caravan, Earthride, Wretched)
- 8
  - Marciano Cantero, 62, Argentine rock singer and bassist (Enanitos Verdes)
  - Sonny West, 85, American rockabilly singer-songwriter and guitarist
- 9
  - Carol Arnauld, 61, French pop singer
  - Herschel Sizemore, 87, American bluegrass mandolinist
  - Trevor Tomkins, 81, British jazz fusion drummer (Gilgamesh)
- 10
  - Paulino Bernal, 83, American Tex-Mex accordionist
  - Jorja Fleezanis, 70, American classical violinist
  - Choichi Terukina, 90, Japanese Ryukyuan sanshin player
- 12
  - Dennis East, 73, South African hard rock singer-songwriter (Stingray)
  - Ramsey Lewis, 87, American jazz pianist and composer
  - PnB Rock, 30, American rapper
- 13
  - Kornelije Kovač, 80, Serbian progressive rock keyboardist (Korni Grupa, Indexi) and classical composer
  - Jesse Powell, 51, American R&B singer
- 14
  - David Andersson, 47, Swedish heavy metal guitarist (Soilwork, The Night Flight Orchestra)
  - Jim Post, 82, American folk singer-songwriter (Friend & Lover)
  - Paul Sartin, 51, British folk singer and multi-instrumentalist (Bellowhead, Faustus, Belshazzar's Feast)
- 16 – Marva Hicks, 66, American soul singer
- 18 – Diane Guérin, 74, Canadian pop singer
- 21
  - Ray Edenton, 95, American country and rock guitarist
  - Anton Fier, 66, American alternative rock drummer (The Feelies, The Golden Palominos, The Lounge Lizards)
- 22
  - Stu Allan, 60, British eurodance DJ (Clock)
  - John Hartman, 72, American rock drummer (The Doobie Brothers)
- 24
  - Sue Mingus, 92, American record producer
  - Pharoah Sanders, 81, American jazz saxophonist
- 26 – Joe Bussard, 86, American record collector
- 27
  - Boris Moiseev, 68, Russian pop singer
  - Christian Hummer, 32, Austrian indie rock keyboardist (Wanda)
- 28 – Coolio, 59, American rapper
- 29 – Prins Póló, 45, Icelandic indie rock singer-songwriter
- 30 — Walkie T, 27, Russian rapper

=== October ===
- 1
  - Stamatis Kokotas, 88, Greek folk singer
  - Kevin Locke, 68, American traditional folk flautist
  - Bin Valencia, 61, Argentine heavy metal drummer (Almafuerte)
- 2 – Mary McCaslin, 75, American folk singer-songwriter
- 3 – Mon Legaspi, 54, Filipino hard rock bassist (Wolfgang)
- 4
  - Jean Gallois, 93, French musicologist and classical violinist
  - Loretta Lynn, 90, American country singer-songwriter
- 5
  - Lenny Lipton, 82, American folk lyricist
  - Ann-Christine Nyström, 76, Swedish pop singer
- 6
  - Adriana Breukink, Dutch classical recorder player and instrument maker
  - Fred Catero, 89, American record producer and engineer
  - Ivy Jo Hunter, 82, American R&B songwriter
  - Jody Miller, 80, American country singer
  - Judy Tenuta, 65, American comedy music singer-songwriter
- 7
  - Ronnie Cuber, 80, American jazz saxophonist
  - Toshi Ichiyanagi, 89, Japanese classical pianist
  - Art Laboe, 97, American radio disk jockey
  - Jure Robežnik, 89, Slovenian jazz pianist
- 8 – Charlie Brown, 80, American radio disk jockey
- 9
  - Andres Cuervo, 34, Colombian pop singer-songwriter
  - Chuck Deardorf, 68, American jazz bassist
  - Josep Soler i Sardà, 87, Spanish classical and opera composer
- 10
  - Anita Kerr, 94, American country and pop singer and arranger
  - Leon Schidlowsky, 91, Chilean-Israeli classical composer
- 11
  - Angela Lansbury, 96, British-American theater singer and actress
  - Willie Spence, 23, American R&B singer
- 12
  - Monsta O, 56, American rapper (Boo-Yaa T.R.I.B.E.)
  - Yurii Kerpatenko, 46, Ukrainian conductor, orchestrator and accordionist
- 13
  - Fuzzy, 83, Danish multi-genre composer
  - Verckys Kiamuangana Mateta, 78, Congolese rumba saxophonist
  - Susanna Mildonian, 82, Italian-born Belgian classical harpist
  - Christina Moser, 70, Swiss new wave singer-songwriter (Krisma)
  - Steve Roberts, 68, British punk drummer (U.K. Subs)
  - Mike Schank, 56, American film composer and guitarist
  - Joyce Sims, 63, American R&B-dance singer-songwriter
- 14 – Mariana Nicolesco, 73, Romanian opera singer
- 15
  - Noel Duggan, 73, Irish folk singer and guitarist (Clannad, The Duggans)
  - Mikaben, 41, Haitian compas and dancehall singer-songwriter
  - Marty Sammon, 45, American blues and ragtime keyboardist
- 17 – Michael Ponti, 84, German classical pianist
- 18
  - Franco Gatti, 80, Italian pop singer (Ricchi e Poveri)
  - Robert Gordon, 75, American rockabilly singer
- 19
  - Geoff Nuttall, 56, Canadian chamber music violinist (St. Lawrence String Quartet)
  - Joanna Simon, 84, American opera singer
- 20
  - Atarah Ben-Tovim, 82, British classical flautist
  - Bettye Crutcher, 83, American R&B singer
  - Lucy Simon, 82, American composer and folk singer (The Simon Sisters)
  - Tsin Ting, 88, Taiwanese film singer
- 21 – Robert Gordy, 91, American music publishing executive and recording artist
- 22 – Luiz Galvão, 87, Brazilian psychedelic rock and MPB songwriter (Novos Baianos)
- 23
  - Don Edwards, 86, American Western singer
  - Libor Pešek, 89, Czech classical conductor
  - Galina Pisarenko, 88, Russian opera singer
- 24
  - Christine Farnon, 97, American music executive
  - Gregg Philbin, American rock bassist (REO Speedwagon)
- 25
  - Branislav Hronec, 81, Slovak classical pianist and conductor
  - Paul Stoddard, American metalcore singer (Diecast)
- 26
  - Lia Origoni, 103, Italian opera and musical theater singer
  - Agustín Ramírez, 70, Mexican Grupera singer-songwriter (Los Caminantes)
- 27 – Geraldine Hunt, 77, American R&B singer
- 28
  - Jerry Lee Lewis, 87, American rock and roll singer and pianist
  - D. H. Peligro, 63, American punk rock drummer (Dead Kennedys, Red Hot Chili Peppers)
- 29
  - Ryan Karazija, 40, American-Icelandic indie rock singer-songwriter and guitarist (Low Roar)
  - Robin Sylvester, British jam band bassist (RatDog)
- 30
  - John McGale, 66, Canadian blues rock singer and multi-instrumentalist (Offenbach)
  - Anthony Ortega, 94, American jazz clarinetist
- 31
  - Michal Ambrož, 68, Czech rock singer and guitarist (Jasná Páka)
  - Patrick Haggerty, 78, American country singer-songwriter (Lavender Country)
  - Danny Javier, 75, Filipino pop and OPM singer (APO Hiking Society)

=== November ===
- 1
  - Tsuneo Fukuhara, 89, Japanese classical composer
  - Takeoff, 28, American rapper (Migos)
  - Joseph Tarsia, 88, American recording engineer and studio owner (Sigma Sound Studios)
- 2 – Atilio Stampone, 96, Argentine tango pianist and composer
- 3
  - Gerd Dudek, 84, German jazz saxophonist, clarinetist, and flautist
  - Noel McKoy, 62, British soul singer
- 4 – Nicole Josy, 76, Belgian pop singer (Nicole and Hugo)
- 5
  - Daniele Barioni, 92, Italian opera singer
  - Aaron Carter, 34, American pop singer and rapper
  - Tyrone Downie, 66, Jamaican reggae keyboardist (Bob Marley and The Wailers)
  - Carmelo La Bionda, 73, Italian disco producer and songwriter (La Bionda)
  - Mimi Parker, 55, American indie rock singer and drummer (Low)
- 6
  - Ali Birra, 72, Ethiopian folk singer
  - Hurricane G, 52, American rapper
  - Tame One, 52, American rapper (Artifacts, Leak Bros, The Weathermen)
- 7
  - Sergey Kuznetsov, 58, Russian pop rock keyboardist and songwriter (Laskovyi Mai)
  - Jeff Cook, 73, American country guitarist (Alabama)
- 8
  - Will Ferdy, 95, Belgian pop singer
  - Claes-Göran Hederström, 77, Swedish schlager singer
  - Pierre Kartner, 87, Dutch schlager singer-songwriter
  - Dan McCafferty, 76, Scottish hard rock singer-songwriter (Nazareth)
- 9
  - Gal Costa, 77, Brazilian Tropicália singer
  - Mattis Hætta, 63, Norwegian pop singer
  - Garry Roberts, 72, Irish new wave guitarist (The Boomtown Rats)
- 10
  - Chris Koerts, 74, Dutch pop rock guitarist (Earth and Fire)
  - Nik Turner, 82, British space rock flautist and saxophonist (Hawkwind, Inner City Unit, Space Ritual)
- 11
  - Keith Levene, 65, British post-punk guitarist (Public Image Ltd., The Clash)
  - Rab Noakes, 75, Scottish folk singer-songwriter and guitarist (Stealers Wheel)
- 12 – Gene Cipriano, 94, American jazz and pop multi-instrumentalist (The Wrecking Crew)
- 14 – Jerzy Połomski. 89, Polish folk and pop singer
- 15
  - John Rex Reeves, 86, American country singer-songwriter
  - Jin Tielin, 82, Chinese vocal coach
- 16 – Mick Goodrick, 77, American jazz guitarist
- 17
  - Azio Corghi, 85, Italian classical composer
  - Ken Mansfield, 85, American record producer
  - B. Smyth, 30, American R&B singer
- 18 – Ned Rorem, 99, American classical composer
- 19
  - Nico Fidenco, 89, Italian pop singer
  - Danny Kalb, 80, American blues rock guitarist (The Blues Project)
- 20
  - Joyce Bryant, 95, American pop singer
  - Riho Sibul, 64, Estonian rock singer and guitarist (Ultima Thule)
- 21 – Wilko Johnson, 75, British pub rock guitarist and songwriter (Dr. Feelgood)
- 22
  - Erasmo Carlos, 81, Brazilian MPB singer-songwriter
  - Pablo Milanés, 79, Cuban nueva trova singer-songwriter
- 23
  - Hugo Helmig, 24, Danish pop singer
  - Shel Macrae, 77, British pop rock singer and guitarist (The Fortunes)
- 25
  - Irene Cara, 63, American pop singer-songwriter and actress
  - Charles Koppelman, 82, American music executive and pop singer (The Ivy Three)
  - Don Newkirk, 56, American film composer and record producer
  - Sammie Okposo, 51, Nigerian gospel singer
- 26 – Louise Tobin, 104, American jazz singer
- 27 – Jake Flint, 37, American Red Dirt country singer
- 30
  - Christine McVie, 79, British rock and blues singer-songwriter and keyboardist (Fleetwood Mac, Chicken Shack)
  - Steve Smith, British punk singer (Red Alert)

=== December ===
- 1
  - Haralds Sīmanis, 71, Latvian pop singer
  - Tord Sjöman, 82, Swedish dansband organist (Vikingarna)
  - Andrew Speight, 58, Australian jazz saxophonist
- 2
  - Jo Carol Pierce, 78, American folk rock singer-songwriter
  - Laila Storch, 101, American classical oboist
- 3
  - Jess Barr, 46, American alternative country guitarist (Slobberbone)
  - Jamie Freeman, 57, British folk singer-songwriter
  - Svenne Hedlund, 77, Swedish pop and schlager singer (Idolerna, Hep Stars, Svenne and Lotta)
  - Volodymyr Kozhukhar, 81, Ukrainian classical composer
  - Bobby Naughton, 78, American jazz vibraphonist and pianist
  - Alexandre Zelkine, 84, French folk singer
- 4
  - Manuel Göttsching, 70, German Krautrock and electronic synthesizer player and guitarist (Ash Ra Tempel, Ashra)
  - Bob McGrath, 96, American actor and singer
- 5 – Hamsou Garba, 63, Nigerien singer
- 6
  - Jet Black, 84, British punk rock drummer (The Stranglers)
  - Hamish Kilgour, 65, New Zealand indie rock drummer and singer (The Clean, Bailter Space)
  - Edino Krieger, 94, Brazilian avant garde composer
- 7 – Roddy Jackson, 70, American rockabilly singer and pianist
- 8 – Yitzhak Klepter, 72, Israeli psychedelic rock singer and guitarist (The Churchills, Kaveret)
- 9
  - Jovit Baldivino, 29, Filipino pop rock singer
  - Gaston Bogaerts, 101, Belgian Latin soul percussionist (The Chakachas)
  - Herbert Deutsch, 90, American composer and inventor (Moog synthesizer)
  - Qamar Gula, 70, Afghan pop singer
- 10
  - John Aler, 73, American opera singer
  - J. J. Barnes, 79, American R&B singer
  - Sulochana Chavan, 89, Indian Lavani singer
  - Tracy Hitchings, 60, British progressive rock singer (Landmarq)
  - Tshala Muana, 64, Congolese Soukous singer
  - Aziouz Raïs, 68, Algerian chaabi singer
  - José Ángel Trelles, 78, Argentine tango singer
  - Kihnu Virve, 94, Estonian folk singer
- 11 – Angelo Badalamenti, 85, American film and television composer and arranger
- 12 – Ekambi Brillant, 74, Cameroonian makossa singer
- 13
  - Sol Amarfio, 84, Ghanaian-British afro rock drummer (Osibisa)
  - Benjamin Bossi, 69, American new wave saxophonist (Romeo Void)
  - Grand Daddy I.U., 54, American rapper
  - Luis "Checho" González, 89, Chilean folk singer
  - Nihal Nelson, 76, Sri Lankan soul and pop singer
  - Bayan Northcott, 82, British classical composer and music critic
  - Lalo Rodríguez, 64, Puerto Rican salsa singer
  - Kim Simmonds, 75, British rock guitarist (Savoy Brown)
- 14
  - Djene Djento, Cameroonian makossa singer-songwriter
  - Koji Ryu, 60, Japanese rock drummer (C-C-B)
- 15
  - Bertha Barbee, 82, American R&B singer (The Velvelettes)
  - Dino Danelli, 78, American rock drummer (The Rascals)
  - Shirley Eikhard, 67, Canadian country singer-songwriter
- 16
  - Rick Anderson, 75, American new wave bassist (The Tubes)
  - Jean-Paul Corbineau, 74, French folk singer-songwriter (Tri Yann)
  - Charlie Gracie, 86, American rock and roll singer and guitarist
- 17
  - Urmas Sisask, 62, Estonian classical composer
  - Yuji Tanaka, 65, Japanese rock drummer (Anzen Chitai)
- 18
  - Martin Duffy, 55, British alternative rock keyboardist (Felt, Primal Scream)
  - Terry Hall, 63, British ska and new wave singer-songwriter (The Specials, Fun Boy Three, The Colourfield, Vegas)
  - Wim Henderickx, 60, Belgian classical composer and percussionist
- 19
  - Claudisabel, 40, Portuguese pop singer
  - Stanley Drucker, 93, American classical clarinetist
  - Sandy Edmonds, 74, British-New Zealand pop singer
- 20
  - Randy Begg, 71, Canadian pop drummer (Wednesday)
  - Iain Templeton, British alternative rock drummer (The La's, Shack)
- 21
  - Harvey Jett, 73, American Southern rock guitarist (Black Oak Arkansas)
  - Bilqees Khanum, Pakistani classical singer
  - Mauro Sabbione, 65, Italian pop keyboardist (Matia Bazar)
- 22
  - Thom Bell, 79, Jamaican-born American soul songwriter and arranger
  - Big Scarr, 22, American rapper
  - Walter "Wolfman" Washington, 79, American blues singer and guitarist
- 23
  - David Dalton, 88, American classical violist
  - Maxi Jazz, 65, British electronic singer-songwriter (Faithless)
  - Madosini, 78, South African traditional Uhadi musical bow player
  - Massimo Savić, 60, Croatian art rock and pop singer (Dorian Gray)
- 24 – Mampintsha, 40, South African kwaito singer (Big Nuz)
- 25
  - Camilo Azuquita, 76, Panamanian salsa singer
  - Brian Cassar, 86, British rock and roll singer and guitarist
  - Paul Fox, American record producer (XTC, Phish, 10,000 Maniacs)
- 26
  - Penda Dallé, 64, Cameroonian makossa guitarist
  - Lasse Lönndahl, 94, Swedish pop singer
- 27
  - Jo Mersa Marley, 31, Jamaican reggae singer
  - Harry Sheppard, 94, American jazz vibraphonist
- 28
  - Scott Nash, Australian hard rock bassist (Asteroid B-612)
  - Black Stalin, 81, Trinidadian calypso singer
  - Linda de Suza, 74, Portuguese pop singer
- 29
  - Eduard Artemyev, 85, Russian film composer
  - Giovanni Pezzoli, 70, Italian pop rock drummer (Stadio)
  - Ian Tyson, 89, Canadian folk singer-songwriter (Ian & Sylvia)
- 31
  - Jeremiah Green, 45, American indie rock drummer (Modest Mouse)
  - Anita Pointer, 74, American R&B singer (The Pointer Sisters)

== Musical films ==
- Elvis
- Moonage Daydream
- Lyle, Lyle, Crocodile
- Tár

== See also ==
- Timeline of musical events
- Women in music
