= 2022 in African music =

The following is a list of events and releases that happened in 2022 in African music.

== Events ==
- April 3 – Angélique Kidjo wins the Grammy Award for Best Global Music Album for the second time, with her 2021 album Mother Nature.
- May 9 – CKay's "Love Nwantiti" becomes the first-ever African song to surpass one billion streams on Spotify.
- May 17 – Interviewed on Asaase Radio, Stonebwoy responds to criticism of himself and other African artists such as Black Sherif for attending a party hosted by Kendrick Lamar in Ghana.
- July 17 – The 18th series of Idols South Africa is launched, with new judges Thembi Seete and JR.
- August 6 – At a political rally in support of Kenyan politician Raila Odinga, Tanzanian musician Diamond Platnumz endorses Odinga as presidential candidate.
- September 4 – The 15th edition of Nigerian music awards The Headies is held in Atlanta, Georgia, United States.
- September 22 – Morocco's Tanjazz Festival is held after a two-year gap caused by the COVID-19 pandemic.
- October 31 – The drowning of Davido's 3-year-old son, in a swimming pool at their Banana Island house, leads to a police investigation.

== Albums released in 2022 ==
Release date	Artist	Album	Genre	Label	Ref
January 28	Nomfundo Moh	Amagama	Afro-pop	Universal	
March 25	Rema	Rave & Roses	Afrorave	Jonzing World/Mavin Records	
May 13	Obongjayar	Some Nights I Dream of Doors	Afrobeat	September Recordings	
May 20	Gigi Lamayne	Set in Stone	Hip hop		
May 27	Brymo	Theta	Folk, sentimental ballad, quiet storm	Independent	
May 27	Nduduzo Makhathini	In The Spirit Of Ntu	Jazz	Blue Note Africa	
July 8	Burna Boy	Love, Damini	Afro-fusion	Atlantic Records	
October 25	Amerado	G.I.N.A	Reggae, Afropop	MicBurnerz Music	
November 2	Seyi Vibez	Billion Dollar Baby	Afrobeats	Vibez Inc / Dvpper Music	
November 11	Gordon Koang	Community		Music in Exile	

== Musical films ==
- Neptune Frost, starring Elvis Ngabo, Cheryl Isheja and Kaya Free, with music by Saul Williams

== Deaths ==
- February 15 – Vivi l'internationale, 75–76, Beninese singer
- February 23 – Riky Rick, 34, South African rapper (suicide)
- March 28 (death announced on this date) – Mira Calix, 51/52, South African electronic musician and producer
- April 8 – Osinachi Nwachukwu, 42, Nigerian gospel singer (cause undisclosed)
- April 14 – Orlando Julius, 79, Nigerian Afrobeat saxophonist, singer, bandleader, and songwriter
- May 15 – Deborah Fraser, 55, South African gospel singer (stroke)
- June 11 – Amb Osayomore Joseph, 69, Nigerian highlife pioneer
- June 12 – Dawit Nega, 34, Ethiopian singer
- June 21 – Pierre Narcisse, 45, Cameroonian singer
- August 15 – Tokollo Tshabalala, 45, South African Kwaito musician
- August 18 – Hadrawi, 79, Somali poet and songwriter
- September 12 – Dennis East, 73, South African singer, songwriter and producer
- November 6 – Ali Birra, 72, Ethiopian singer
- November 25 – Sammie Okposo, 51, Nigerian gospel singer
- December 5 – Hamsou Garba, 63, Nigerien singer
- December 10
  - Tshala Muana, 64, Congolese singer, "Queen of Mutuashi"
  - Aziouz Raïs, 68, Algerian chaabi singer.
- December 12 – Ekambi Brillant, 74, Cameroonian makossa singer

== See also ==
- 2022 in music
