= Cantilo =

Cantilo is a surname. Notable people with the surname include:

- Fabiana Cantilo (born 1959), Argentine musician
- José Luis Cantilo (1871–1944), Argentine politician
- María José Cantilo (1953–2022), Argentine singer and songwriter
