= DeMeo =

DeMeo is a surname. Notable people with the surname include:

- Adriana DeMeo (born 1981), American actress
- Bob DeMeo (1955-2022), American musician
- Roy DeMeo (1940–1983), Italian-American mobster
- Tony DeMeo (born 1948), American football coach
- William DeMeo (born 1971), American actor, producer, director, and writer

== See also ==
- Dameo
- Demeo
