= Edo Funk =

Nigerian musical genre

- Stylistic origins: dance music, traditional edo music
- Cultural origins: 1970s Nigeria
- Typical instruments: Varies

Regional scenes
- Nigeria

Local scenes
- Edo State

Edo funk is a musical style from Benin City, Edo State, created in the early 1970s. The Edo Funk music genre is a cosmopolitan popular dance music with integrating elements from the native Edo culture and fusing them with new sound effects coming from Nigerian night-clubs. Nick Roseblade describes Edo Funk as "[a] hybrid music that mixed traditional rhythms, jazz horns, driving drums, day-glo keyboards, and wonky guitars. It reduced everything down to the bare minimum."

Edo Funk's pioneers and best known exponent is Victor Uwaifo, who has released a series of Edo Funk album recordings starting in the 1970s with other Edo musicians such as Akaba Man, Osayomore Joseph, Ukodo, Fabomo and Collins Oke. Ekassa and Akwete were also the sub genres of Edo Funk, to interpret the traditional Benin sound.

In 2021, German Record label Analog Africa released Edo Funk Explosion Vol. 1, a compilation of song by Victor Uwaifo, Osayomore Joseph and Akaba Man.

== See also ==
- Victor Uwaifo
