= Azúcar =

Azúcar (English: "Sugar") or Azuquita and other spellings may refer to:

- Azúcar pa' ti (Sugar for You), a 1965 album by Eddie Palmieri
  - "Azúcar", a song by Eddie Palmieri from his album Azúcar pa' ti (Sugar for You)
- Azúcar (Los Van Van album), 1992
- Azúcar Negra, a 1993 album by Celia Cruz
  - "Azúcar Negra", a song by Celia Cruz from her album Azúcar Negra
- "Azuquita Pal Café", a song by El Gran Combo de Puerto Rico from their album In Alaska: Breaking the Ice, 1984
- "Azúcar amargo", a song by Fey from her album Tierna la Noche, 1996
- "Azúcar", a song by A.B. Quintanilla III y Los Kumbia Kings from their album Amor, Familia y Respeto, 1999
- "Azukita", a song by Steve Aoki featuring Play-N-Skillz, Daddy Yankee, and Elvis Crespo from his album Neon Future III, 2018
- Azúcar Amarga, a 1996 American-Dominican film
- ¡Azúcar!, a 2003 tribute concert and television special in honor of Celia Cruz
- Azúcar Moreno, Spanish music duo
- Camilo Azuquita (1946–2022), Panamanian singer and composer
- Víctor Azúcar (1946–1979), Salvadoran footballer

== See also ==
- Pan de Azúcar (disambiguation)
- Sugar (disambiguation)
