= Azúcar (Los Van Van album) =

Studio album by Los Van Van
- Released: 1992 (Cuba)
- Studio: Estudios de las Grabaciones Egrem (Havana)
- Label: Green Linnet/Xenophile, Areito
- Producer: Juan Formell

Los Van Van chronology
25 Años (1994)	Azúcar (1992)	Lo Ultimo En Vivo (1995)

Azúcar is an album by the Cuban band Los Van Van. It was released in the United States in 1994, the band's first album in eight years to be widely distributed. Due to the U.S. embargo, the band did not tour behind the album until 1996.

== Production ==
The album was recorded in 1992. Los Van Van constituted 15 members, including three trombonists and three violinists. Piano player César Pedroso contributed to the songwriting.

== Critical reception ==
Professional ratings
Review scores
Source	Rating
AllMusic	4/5 stars
Robert Christgau	(1-star Honorable Mention)
The Encyclopedia of Popular Music	4/5 stars

The Gazette called the album "vibrant dance music, a furious stew of trombones and violins, timbales, congas, keyboards and rousing vocals." The Guardian deemed it "old-fashioned, high class, salsa from Cuba's foremost band." The Boston Globe praised the "bright, hot dance tunes, played with extraordinary verve, punchy horns jumping out from a powerhouse rhythm section."

The Americas determined that Los Van Van "takes the humble son into another dimension through splashes of modem influences and highly charged, energetic performances." The Boston Herald stated that the sound "hinges on the interplay between charismatic singer Pedro Clavo and the chorus, an explosive percussion battery and the driving electric bass lines of band founder Juan Formell." The Nation included the album in its article on 1994's notable releases.

AllMusic wrote that "most of the CD consists of straight-ahead Afro-Cuban salsa; however, it also contains a few cuts that are essentially Latin pop with Afro-Cuban elements."

== Track listing ==
No.	Title	Length
1.	"Disco Azúcar"
2.	"Tú No Colabores Si No Es Contigo"
3.	"Que le Den Candela"
4.	"Con El Destino No Se Puede"
5.	"Ese Es Mi Problema"
6.	"Oh No"
7.	"Hasta las Cuantas"
8.	"La Historia de Tania y Juan"
9.	"Esperando Llamada"
