= Djene Djento =

Cameroonian singer-songwriter (1963–2022)

- Born: Alain Djene Djento; 1963; Douala, Cameroon
- Died: 14 December 2022 (aged 58–59); Dschang, Cameroon
- Occupation: Singer-songwriter

Alain Djene Djento (1963 – 14 December 2022) was a Cameroonian singer-songwriter.

== Biography ==
Djento was born in the Ngodi neighborhood of Douala in 1963. He began his career in 1970 with the group Les Johnco alongside John Sallé and Manulo Nguime. At the start of the 1980s, he formed the group N’Kumbe alongside Nguime, Ngoloko Zachée, and Patrick Djerky. He released his first album in 1983, titled Débroussailler.

Djene Djento died in Dschang on 14 December 2022.

== Discography ==
- Débroussailler (1983)
- Ndjangui Moni (1985)
- Ndola Bwanga (1987)
- Ma Thérèse (1989)
- Pompé (1990)
- 8e Commandement (1998)
- Mota Sawa (2008)
- Vivre ensemble (2018)
