= Dawit Nega =

Ethiopian singer (1988–2022)

Dawit Nega ዳዊት ነጋ
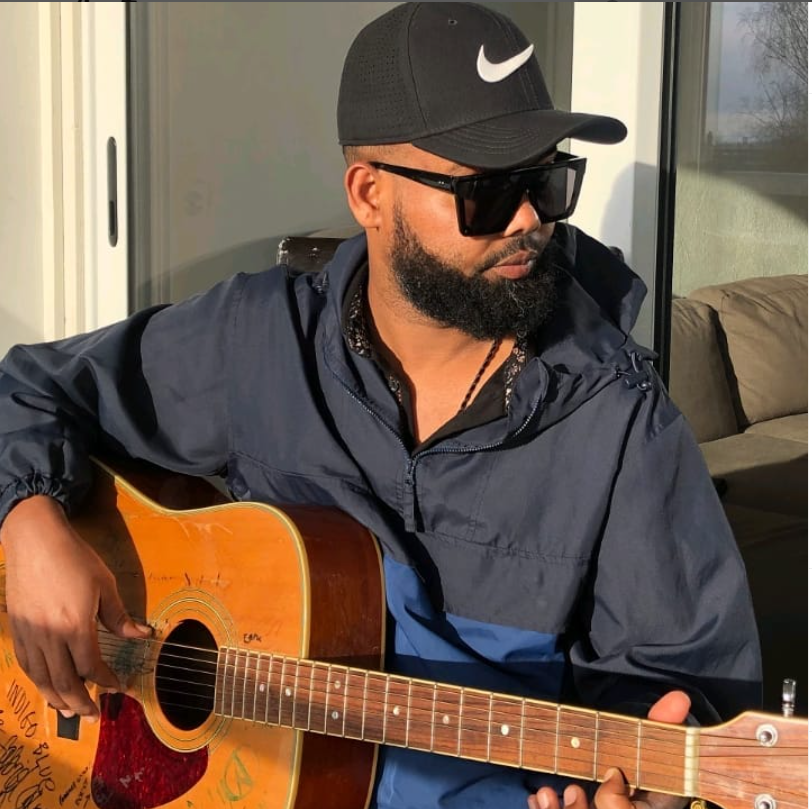

Background information
- Born: 11 April 1988; Mekelle, Tigray Province, Ethiopia
- Died: 12 June 2022 (aged 34) Addis Ababa, Ethiopia
- Genres: Ethiopian music Tigrigna music
- Years active: 2010–2022

Dawit Nega (Tigrinya: ዳዊት ነጋ; 11 April 1988 – 12 June 2022) was a Tigrayan singer whose prominence raised popularity of Tigrigna music. His songs were singled out at having a distinctive voice. His most popular songs include "Damana", "Baba Ilen", "Hidyat Mekelle", "Wezamey", "Zewidero", "Binetselay", "Kudus Tsebaya" and "Chekolata."

== Life and career ==
Dawit lost his parents at a young age and he sold cigarettes, gum and other small goods on the streets to get his daily bread. Nega, who said that he had developed a deep passion for music since he was a child, at around the age of 15, with the aim of realizing his musical interests and dreams, asked to join the circus and music group "Circus Tigray." The request did not get a positive response in time but was given the opportunity to join the March band and play drums (Dram)."Success is always close to us," Dawit said in his interview, noting in his own life that "if you work hard and don't give up, it's not hard to reach your goals." Nega faced life challenges ranging from losing his parents to losing his daily bills and rent payments.

His last single released was titled "Ajoki Tigray," which he described as nostalgia for Tigray families who were separated and unable to meet due to the Tigray War that has been taking place since November 2020.

Dawit Nega was married and had one child.
