= Julie Daraîche =

Canadian singer (1938–2022)

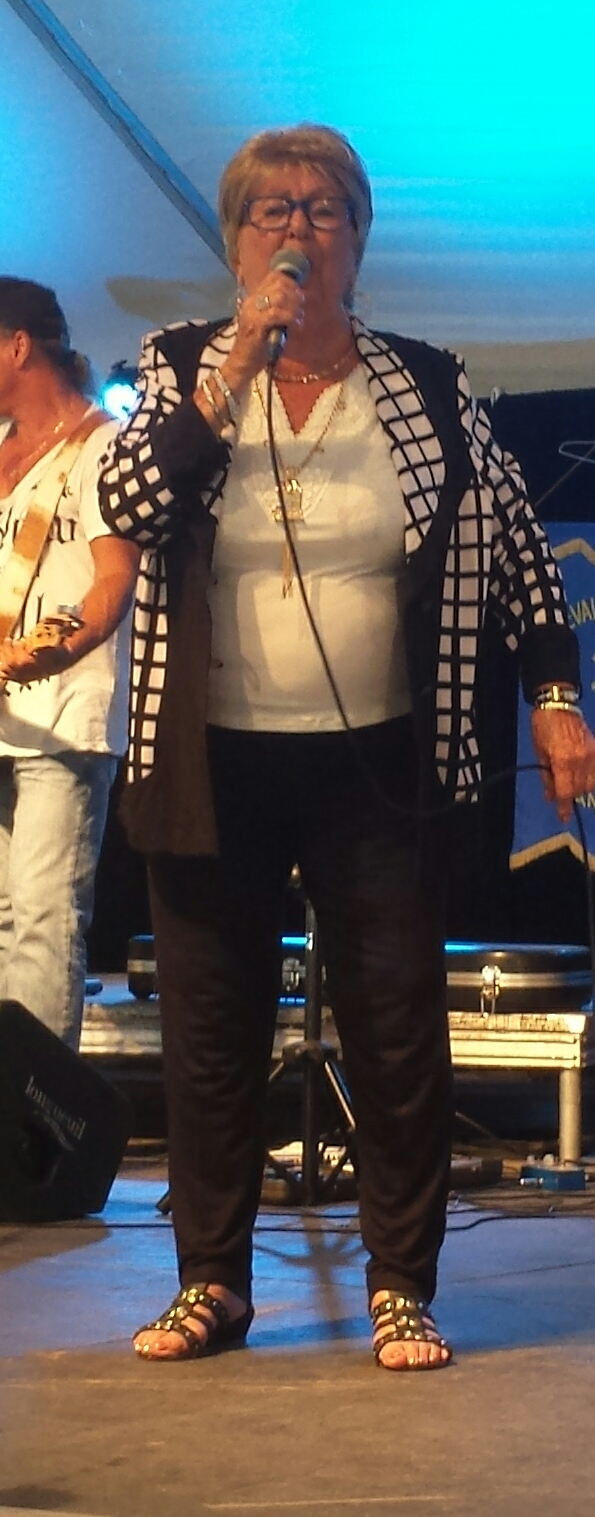
- Born: 27 April 1938; Saint-François-de-Pabos, Québec, Canada
- Died: 26 April 2022 (aged 83)
- Occupation: Singer-songwriter
- Years active: 1965–2022
- Style: Country music

Julie Daraîche (27 April 1938 – 26 April 2022) was a Québécoise singer-songwriter of country music. She was a member of the Daraîche family of the Gaspé Peninsula, who have been famous in Quebec music since the 1960s. Julie Daraîche is considered Quebec's queen of country music.

Julie Daraîche released 50 albums in a 50-year career, and sold over one million records. In 1979 she received the first Félix Award for best country album.

== Biography ==
Daraîche was born in Saint-François-de-Pabos, Québec, Canada. While working as a barmaid in Montreal, Julie Daraîche began her singing career around 1965. Her first four albums achieved gold certification in Quebec (50,000 copies sold). With Un verre sur la table et Que la lune est belle ce soir she won the best country album of the year at the first ADISQ (Quebec Association of Recording Industries) gala in 1979.

Daraîche trained her brother, Paul Daraîche, in the genre of bar music; on his own, he sold more than one million records in a 40-year career. Daraîche took part in 15 albums with other members of the Daraîche family, and co-wrote the album Mes premières chansons with her daughter, Dani.

In 2009 she released a tribute album to many of her late colleagues. She has worked with the Tadros brothers, Paul Brunelle, Marcel Martel and Willie Lamothe. Daraîche continued to tour in Quebec, Ontario and the Maritimes.

Daraîche stated that she was planning her farewell tour for 2018.

Daraîche died on 26 April 2022, the day before her 84th birthday, in Terrebonne, Quebec.
