= Susanna Mildonian =

Belgian harpist (1940–2022)

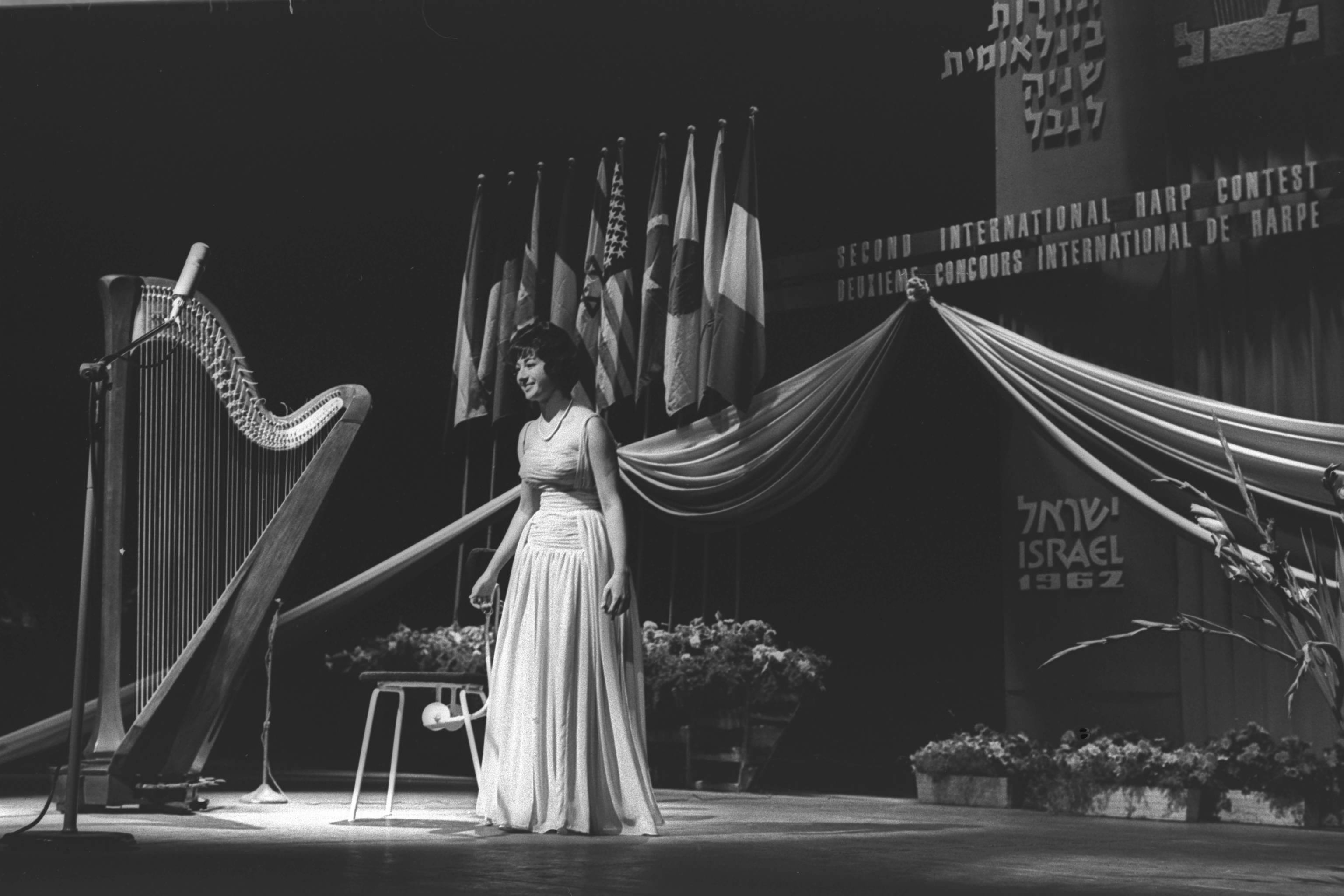
- Mildonian in 1959
- Born: 2 July 1940; Venice, Italy
- Died: 7 October 2022 (aged 82); Brussels, Belgium
- Education: Conservatorio di Musica Benedetto Marcello di Venezia; Conservatoire de Paris
- Occupation: Harpist

Susanna Mildonian (Armenian: Սուսաննա Միլդոնյան; 2 July 1940 – 7 October 2022) was a Belgian harpist and educator.

== Biography ==
Born in Venice to an Armenian family, Mildonian studied the harp under Margherita Cicognari at the Conservatorio di Musica Benedetto Marcello di Venezia before continuing her studies at the Conservatoire de Paris under the direction of Pierre Jamet.

Mildonian recorded concertos for the harp with orchestra by Alberto Ginastera and Heitor Villa-Lobos, concertos for two harps with orchestra by François-Joseph Gossec, and concertos for violin and harp with orchestra by Louis Spohr. She translated the piano sonata of Mateo Albéniz into D minor for harp.

In 1971, Mildonian became a harp professor at the Royal Conservatory of Brussels, the Fontys School of Fine and Performing Arts, and Codarts. She also taught summer courses at Accademia Musicale Chigiana in Siena and the Fondazione Ugo e Olga Levi in Venice. When she retired in 2004, she donated her collection of approximately 500 scores to the foundation.

Mildonian was the only Harpist to have ever won first prize in the 3 most prestigious international harp competitions - the Israel International Harp Competition in 1959, the Geneva Competition in 1964, and the French Marcel Tournier Competition in 1971. She also received the Grand Prix du Disque in Paris.

Mildonian died in October 2022, at the age of 82.

== Awards ==
- First Prize at The International Harp Contest in Israel (1959)
- First Prize at the Geneva International Music Competition (1964)
- First Prize at the Harp Competition "Marcel Tournier" (1971)
