= Chantal Gallia =

Algerian-born French singer and humorist (1956–2022)

- Born: Chantal Halimi; 8 December 1956; Constantine, French Algeria
- Died: 10 July 2022 (aged 65); Paris, France
- Occupations: Singer, humorist

Chantal Gallia (born Chantal Halimi; 8 December 1956 – 10 July 2022) was an Algerian-born French singer, humorist, and impersonator.

== Biography ==
As an impersonator, Gallia participated in the television programs L'Académie des neuf, Numéro un, and Les Jeux de 20 heures during the 1970s and 80s. In 1978, she held a small role in the film Take It from the Top, directed by Nicole de Buron. In August 1989, she hosted a weekly special, Gallia d'la joie, broadcast on Antenne 2.

In the 1990s, Gallia collaborated with Thierry Sforza to write the script for her show J'annonce, j'abats, shown at the Théâtre de la Renaissance in 1992. In 1993, she worked alongside Sforza again for Non mais je rêve, shown at the Théâtre Michel.

Chantal Gallia died of a stroke in Paris on 10 July 2022, aged 65.

== Discography ==
- Naître ou ne pas naître (1976)
- Pas d'mari pour Mimi (1976)
- Amoureusement vôtre (1977)
- Tout un programme ! (1977)
- La chanteuse noire (1978)
- Slow nu (1978)
- Disco cloche (1980)
- S.O.S...je suis là (1980)
- La salsaméricain (1983)
- Bidon (1983)
- La mémoire qui chante (1987)
