= Ralf Bursy =

German musician (1956–2022)

Ralf "Bummi" Bursy (18 January 1956 – 14 February 2022) was a German pop and rock singer and music producer, who was particularly successful and popular in the German Democratic Republic until 1989.

== Life ==
Bursy was born in East Berlin on 18 January 1956. He first completed an apprenticeship as a machine and plant mechanic and later a distance learning course at the Hanns Eisler School of Music Berlin. From 1977 to 1979, he sang in the hard rock band Regenbogen (Rainbow). This was the result of a school band formed with friends, the program consisted mainly of re-enacted songs by Uriah Heep and Deep Purple. He was known to a wider audience through the song Du machst mich verliebt (You make me love you) under the National Youth Festival band of the GDR in 1978. From 1979 to 1981, he was then lead singer of the band Keks (Biscuit) before joining the band Prinzip (Principle) in 1982.

After separation from the band in July 1986, he began a solo career under the stage name Ralf Bummi Bursy. Musically, he was accompanied by Conny Bauer (trombone), Ferry Grott (trombone), Rene Decker (saxophone), Reinhard Petereit (guitar), Judit Tudor (background), and the pop-jazz band Flair. In the next years he entered the East German music charts with various singles. Until 1989, the GDR-record label Amiga released two albums of Bursy and another one was published in 1992 by the Amiga successor DSB. The LP Wind im Gesicht (Wind in your face) sold more than 100,000 copies in the GDR. Six years later, with BMG, a newly chosen selection of his most famous songs was released.

After 1992 Bursy worked as a producer for Nena, Veronika Fischer and PM Sampson among others and for the company Jay Kay Music Entertainment. He later retired from the music business and owned several clothing stores in Berlin. He died on 14 February 2022 in Berlin, at the age of 66. Bursy left behind his wife and two children.

== Discography ==
Albums

- 1987: Wind im Gesicht (Amiga)
- 1989: Irgendwo (Amiga)
- 1992: Schick mich auf die Reise (DSB)
- 1998: Eh die Liebe stirbt (BMG)

Singles & EPs

- 1986: Eh' die Liebe stirbt / Feuer im Eis / In der Tiefe der Nacht / Ein Lied (Amiga-Quartett)
- 2004: Keine Lügen mehr
