= Pupy y Los que Son, Son =

Cuban music group

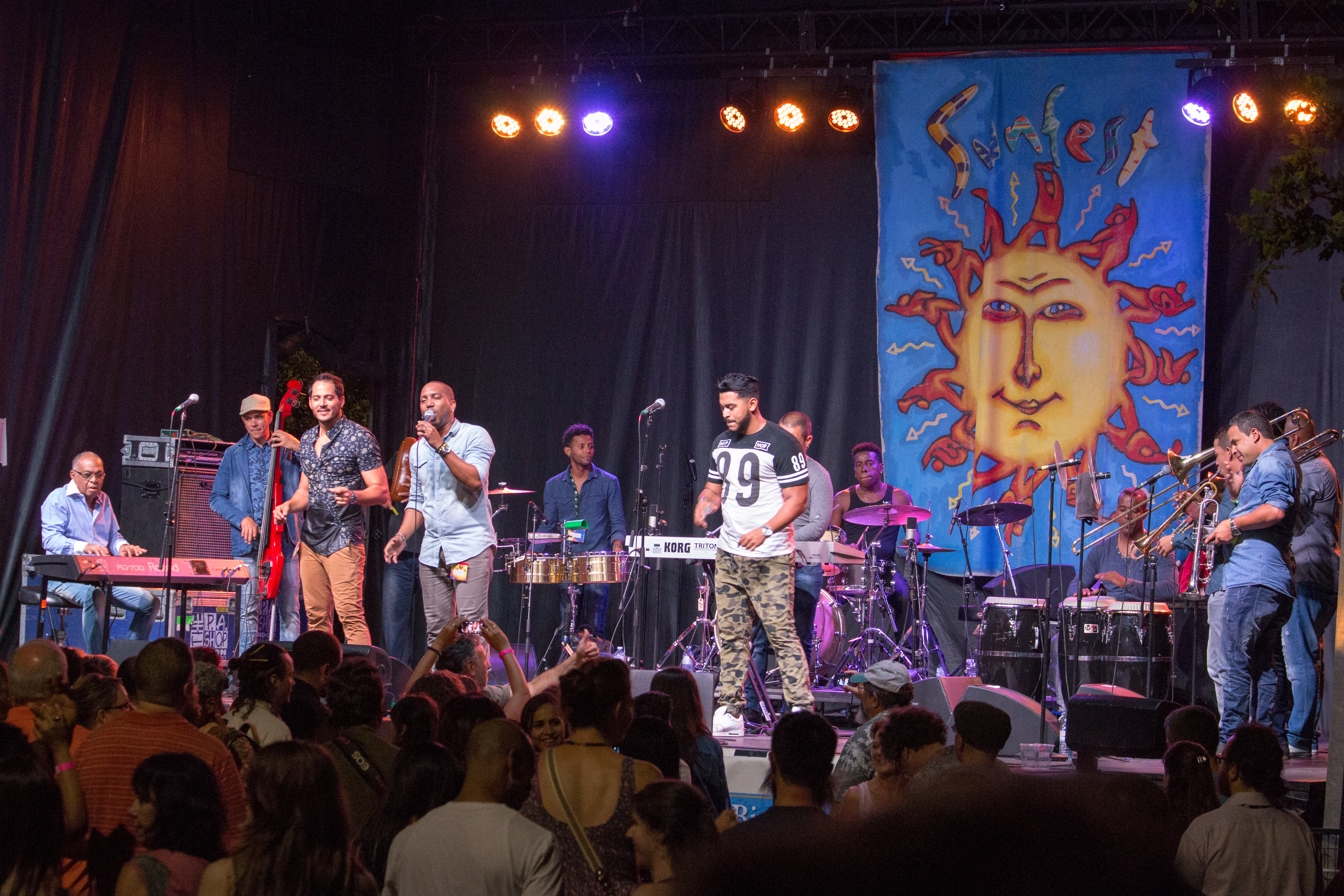
Pupy y Los Que Son, Son performing at the Sunfest festival in London, ON in July 2015

Pupy y Los que Son, Son was the band of the Cuban musician Cesar "Pupy" Pedroso, founded in 2001. "Pupy" Pedroso died in July 2022.

== Members ==
- Cesar Pedroso Fernández / Musical Director and Piano
- Jóse Gómez Martinez / Lead Vocals
- Armando Cantero Abreu / Lead Vocals
- Tirso Duarte / Lead Voz
- Lilibet Jove / Background Vocals
- Gerardo Miro Rivera / Violin
- Osiris Martínez Rodríguez / Keyboards
- Reinier Elizarde Ruanio / bass
- Jóse Luis Quintana Fuerte / Pad
- Roelvis Reyes Simono / drums
- Rene Suárez Zapata / Timbales
- Julio Noroña Pérez / Güiro
- Jorge Castillo Hernández / Congas
- Leonardo Tereuel Velásquez / Trumpet
- Juan Carlos Gonzáles Borrero / Trumpet
- Sergio R. Luna Longchamp / Trombone
- Neuris Lorenzo Mustelier / Trombone

== Discography ==
2001 - “Pupy y Los Que Son Son: Timba - The New Generation Of Latin Music" TERMIDOR MUSIKVERLAG (Deutschland) Songs: 1.La voluminosa 2.El vecino se mudó 3.Qué cosas tiene la vida 4.El gato amaga y no araña 5.Juégala 6.Te molesta que sea Feliz 7.Las mujeres son 8.Mamita portate bien 9.Vamos a gozar hasta afuera

2002 - “Que cosas tiene la vida” EGREM (Cuba) Songs: 1. Que cosas tiene la vida, 2. El Vecino se mudó, 3. El Gato amaga y no araña , 4. Mamita pórtate bien, 5. La bomba soy yo, 6. Ay Papá, 7. El Pregonero, 8. Juégala, 9. Te molesta que sea feliz, 10. Seis Semanas

2003 - “De la Timba a Pogolotti” TERMIDOR MUSIKVERLAG (Deutschland) Songs: 1.Ya tu campana no suena 2.Habla claro camara 3.Disculpeme señora 4.Ese huevo quiere sal 5.Parece mentira 6.Me falta un año 7.Rico timbalero 8.El bate de aluminio 9.Tú quisieras ser la fiera 10.Homenaje a ma'y pa'

2004 - “Pupy el buenagente” TERMIDOR MUSIKVERLAG (Deutschland) Songs: 1. Buenagente, 2. Disco Azucar, 3. Dicen Que Dicen, 4. Tres Gordos, 5. Gato Por Liebre, 6. Figura Soy Yo, 7. Ay Lola, 8. Cuenta Decisiva, 9. Ven Pa' Que No Me Llore

2005 - “Mi timba cerra” EGREM (Cuba) Songs: 1. De la Timba a Pogolotti, 2. La borrachera, 3. El puro, 4. La bala de Billy, 5. Si la ves, 6. La fiera, 7. Cuéntamelo todo, 8. Al final, 9. Del trabajo a la casa, 10. La vida es un carnaval, 11. Mi popurrit, 12. De la Timba a Pogolotti (Video track)

2008 - "Tranquilo que yo controlo" EGREM (Cuba) Songs: 1.Si me quieres conocer, 2.Se parece a aquel, 3.A la italiana, 4.Un poquito al reves, 5.bailalo hasta fuera(La Machucadera), 6.Vecina presteme el cubo, 7.Olvidala, 8.El barniz, 9.Cuando los an~os pasan (Casablanca), 10. Desde cero, 11.Ve bajando, 12.Calla, calla, 13.Nadie puede contra esto, 14.Si me quieres conocer repris

2011 - "Siempre PUPY" EGREM (Cuba) Songs: 01. Mi música, 02.Pirolo, 03.Oh no, 04.Julito, 05.La Loca, 06.Deja la Duda Belen, 07.La Batea, 08.Parece Mentira, 09.Al Final del 9no, 10.Caramelo con bombón, 11.La Habana, 12.El Loco
