= Luis "Checho" González =

Chilean musician (1933–2022)

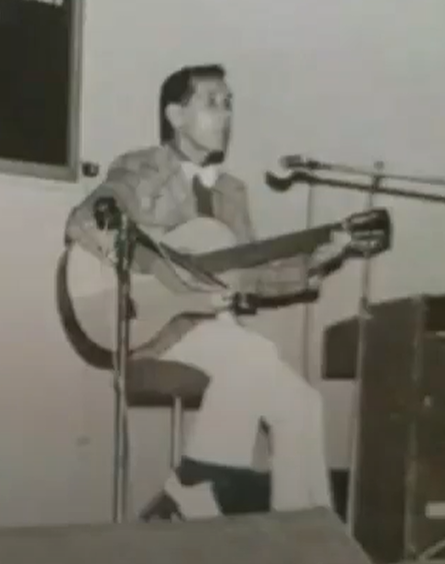
- Born: Luis Orlando González Jiménez; 21 June 1933; Iquique, Chile
- Died: 13 December 2022 (aged 89); Iquique, Chile
- Other name: Checho
- Education: University of Chile
- Occupations: Composer and songwriter
- Notable work: Mi General Augusto Pinochet song

Luis "Checho" Orlando González Jiménez (21 June 1933 – 13 December 2022) was a Chilean musician. He is most notable for having created "Mi General Augusto Pinochet", a song that glorifies Pinochet and his military dictatorship that lasted from 1973 to 1990. In the 1950s, he was a member of several musical trios, including "Los González", "Los Mantles", and "Los Mineros", and composed songs with Rubí Jáuregui. In the 2010 Copiapó mining accident, he accompanied the relatives in the Esperanza camp. Through the record labels he created, he delivered "Dragones" and "Boyas" de Plata (characteristic symbols of his hometown). These awards were also presented at the Festival of the Elderly held in 2003 with Checho's own funding.

== Biography ==
The González Jiménez family is originally from the former port of Caleta Buena. Their parents were Antonio Segundo González Calibar and Luisa del Carmen Jiménez Fajardo. From this union were born five boys and two girls, Hector Walterio, born on 4 June 1924; Antonio Segundo, born on 20 August 1926; Hernán Arturo, born on 15 January 1928; Luis Orlando, born on 21 June 1933; Manuel Honorio, born on 16 June 1938; María Violeta, born on 2 September 1940; and Luisa Nancy, born on 7 February 1943. After his family suffered a house fire in Caleta Buena, they moved to Iquique, in front of the Arica square, after which they enrolled the first three brothers, in the religious dance "Los Morenos". Later on they moved to Sotomayor street, where Luis Orlando González was born, he was registered in the "San Gerardo" church, with father Delgadillo. At an early age Luis showed closeness to religion. He and his brothers were enrolled in the "Star of Chile" football club. Later his parents moved again to Amunategui street in front of La Cruz hill and there, his brother Manuel Honorio was born. His godmother, Luisa Polanco, a native of the now-defunct Santa Laura saltpetre office, went to live with Luis in the saltpetre office until she was 5 years old. When she returned to live with her brothers, she was interested in learning to play the guitar.

His uncle, Romelio Jiménez Fajardo, was a baker and leader of the CUT and a councilman of the illustrious municipality of Iquique. He studied at No. 1 Santa María and the Escuela Básica E-76 Centenario de Iquique, then was sent to study in Santiago, graduating from the Universidad de Chile. In 2005 he became seriously ill with a stroke. "Checho" has also called himself a guru of healing. González is the great-uncle of Fernando Godoy Bustamante.

=== Artistic career ===
In 1951, he and his brothers "Toño" and "Nino" formed a band called "Los González" which was dissolved because "Nino" had to continue with his studies. Then he formed a trio called "The Mantles" with two of his friends. On February 2, 1954, they made their debut in the program "Falabella" hosted by Raúl Matas. One of his friends, Humberto Leiva, retired from "Los Mantles" and Luis along with Ruben Tapia, and his brother Toño formed a new trio called "Los Seycos" (serious and correct), however Matas suggested renaming it "Los Mineros". Two days later they make their debut at the "Baquedano" theatre, together with Lucho Gatica who arrived successfully from Spain.

After those, they returned to Iquique and found a radio festival called "Almirante Lynch", which was held at the National Theatre where he met Rubí Jáuregui, who he then invited to join the group in order to replace Rubén who had fallen ill. In another visit to Santiago they were represented in radio mining in Teatro Caupolicán, as they were invited by Matas. In January 1959 his brother "Toño" fell ill and stayed in Santiago recovering so the group stopped performing. Rubí also stayed in Santiago with his family and Don Checho traveled to Antofagasta, performing as a soloist and singer-songwriter hired by the Antofagasta Hotel where two executives of the Potrerillos Ore saw him perform and hired him a few days later. He came to perform at the Ore with great success, where he was hired with a solid income. However that same year his mother fell ill and he decided to return to his hometown with his family canceling the contract.

In 1967 he created two record labels and two labels; "Golden Dragon", and "Golden Buoy", later, because he had no financing or sponsorship, he had to lower it to silver being financed by he and his wife. In 2014, he had made 7 banners, 34 hymns and more than 500 prizes with "dragons" in Chile and abroad. In 2001, he participated in the album "Iquique en un CD". In 2002 and 2003, it held a Festival of the Elderly, which it proposed should be of an international level and was held in the Norte Grande of Chile. "Checho" received no state or private funding for the event. The awards given were the characteristic "Silver Buoys" and "Golden Dragons". In April 2003 he received a distinction from the "Agrupación Dragón". In 2008 he was in charge of delivering "Boyas de Plata" to a series of Chilean television personalities.

During the rescue of the San José mine of 33 miners, Luis González was in the "Esperanza" camp during the time that the event lasted, sharing with the families of the miners, church authorities and civilians. He also wrote the song "Homenaje al Minero" or "The Miner" which was used for a film that was filmed on location by the BBC in London.

In 2011 in Copiapó delivered "Dragones de Plata" to the families of those affected by the mining accident. In 2012, one year after the 2011 Chilean Air Force C-212 crash, he paid tribute to Felipe Camiroaga, being invited to TVN. He lived with a grace pension. He also composed a song for Jorge Soria Quiroga, former mayor of Iquique, and Iván Barbaric Sciaraffia, a politician from Tarapacá.

=== Mi General Augusto Pinochet ===
Luis "Checho" González is the author of the song "Mi General Augusto Pinochet" which was originally published in a 1995 cassette, called Himno en Honor al Capitán General Don Augusto Pinochet Ugarte – Apología y marchas al Ejército de Chile, which was made by the musical stamp "Dragón".

=== Death ===
González died in Iquique on 13 December 2022, at the age of 89.

== Discography ==
Year	Title	Type	Format	Group
1966	Bajeza / Nostalgias del Amor	Single	Vinyl	Los Mineros
1968	Himno a Iquique / A Campaña	Single	Vinyl	Los González
1971	¿Qué Pasó En La Tirana? / Antofagasta, Perla del Norte	Single	Vinyl	Performed along "Nino" González
1972	Checho, Ruby y Nino - Los González	Album	Vinyl	Los González
1973	Cumbia del Tripulante	Single	Vinyl	Performed along "Toño" González
1973	Iquique Querido / A Rubén Godoy	Single	Vinyl	Solo
1995	Himno en Honor al Capitán General Don Augusto Pinochet Ugarte	Album	Cassette	Solo
2004	Los Éxitos de Laura en América	Album	CD	Solo
2020	Todo por la Patria	Album	Digital	Solo
Unknown	Luis "Checho" González	Album	Cassette	Solo
2003	Abuelos Queridos	Album	CD	Solo
