= Bernardas Vasiliauskas =

Lithuanian organist (1938–2022)

Bernardas Vasiliauskas (28 April 1938 – 21 February 2022) was a Lithuanian pianist and organist.

== Biography ==
Vasiliauskas was born in Kaunas on 28 April 1938. Vasiliauskas finished at the Lithuanian Academy of Music and Theatre as a pianist in 1961 and as an organist in 1966. In 1968 he won first prize in the Mikalojus Konstantinas Čiurlionis Competition of Pianists and Organists. He played mostly 19th- and 20th-century music for the pipe organ. Vasiliauskas had recorded 15 LPs and 12 CDs. He died in Vilnius on 21 February 2022, at the age of 83.
