= Stingray (band) =

South African band

- Origin: Johannesburg, South Africa
- Genres: Hard rock, AOR
- Years active: 1978–1981
- Label: Nitty Gritty
- Past members: Dennis East (Vocals); Danny Antill (Keyboards, Flute); Mike Pilot (Guitar); Shaun Wright (Drums, replaced by Wally Cullis in 1981); Eddie Boyle (Bass, replaced by Gerald "Jiggs" Downing in 1980); Allan Goldswain (Keyboards)

Stingray was a South African rock band active from 1978 to 1981.

== History ==
The band was founded in 1978 by Dennis East, Eddie Boyle and Mike Pilot, previous members of The Rising Sons. In 1979 they released their eponymous debut album. Their subsequent single release "Better the Devil You Know"^{[a]} reached number four in the South African chart. Their second album Operation Stingray was released in 1980. After drummer Shaun Wright lost a leg during a shark attack in the same year, he was replaced by Wally Cullis from Circus. Although they were popular in their home nation, the group achieved only little success in other markets and disbanded in 1981. Today, the technical and compositional quality of their songs is lauded.

Dennis East died at the age of 73 on September 12, 2022, three days after suffering a stroke.

== Discography ==
=== Albums ===
- Stingray (1979), Nitty Gritty
- Operation Stingray (1980), Nitty Gritty
- Best of Stingray (1981), Nitty Gritty
- Forty Days Soundtrack – Various Artists (1980), EMI

=== Singles ===
- "Better the Devil You Know" (1979), Nitty Gritty
- "The Man in My Shoes" (1979), Nitty Gritty
- "Where Do We Go from Here" (1980), Nitty Gritty
- "No Dice" (1980), Nitty Gritty
- "Devotion" (1981), Nitty Gritty

== Notes ==
^a Not to be confused with the Kylie Minogue song of the same name
