= Gracia Montes =

Spanish singer (1922–2022)

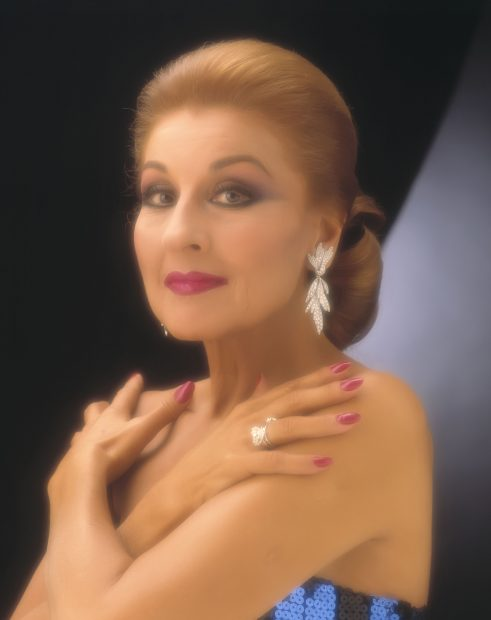
- Montes in 1992
- Born: Gracia Cabrera Gómez; 1 March 1936; Lora del Río, Seville, Spain
- Died: 2 June 2022 (aged 86); Seville, Spain
- Citizenship: Spain
- Occupation: Singer
- Years active: 1953-2002
- Musical career
- Genres: Copla, flamenco, pop
- Instrument: Vocals

Gracia Cabrera Gómez (1 March 1936 – 2 June 2022), known professionally as Gracia Montes, was a Spanish copla, flamenco and pop singer.

== Early life ==
Montes was born in Lora del Río, Seville, on 1 March 1936.

== Career ==
=== 1950s ===
Montes made her debut in 1953 with the show "La copla por bandera" in Madrid. At the age of 17, she appeared at the Juvenile Galas held at the Cervantes Theater in Seville, joining the shows of various companies, including those of singers Pepe Pinto and La Niña de los Peines (Pastora Pavón) and in the variety shows of Mercedes Vecino and Los Gaditanos.Pastora Pavón, a prominent cante jondo singer, was one of Montes's earliest musical influences. For various reasons, some critics of the time likened her style to the cantaora.

In the mid-1950s, Montes made her first recording with Columbia Records. That included bulerías such as "La luna y el río" and "¿Será una rosa?", both written by Francisco de Val. She took part in radio programs in the fifties, such as Conozca usted a sus vecinos (Know your neighbors), by Rafael Santisteban, and Cabalgata fin de Semana, directed by Bobby Deglané. Montes performed her hit "¿Será una rosa?" as well as "Amor, ¿por qué no viniste, amor?" (Love, why didn't you come, love?) and "Camino del cielo" (Road to Heaven). The recording edited by Columbia of the latter differs from the original lyrics written by de Val.

Director Juan Antonio Bardem cast Montes in the film Death of a Cyclist (1955), in which she performed the fandango "Amor, ¿por qué no viniste, amor?" ("Love, why didn't you come, love?"), in the styles of fandangos de Huelva and verdiales. Her performance also included verses from the fandango "Quisiera ser vaquero" ("I Would Like to Be a Cowboy") by Pepe Pinto, recorded live for the film in a version different from the one released on disc. Later, director José Luis Sáenz de Heredia called her for his film Radio Stories (1955). The director asked Gracia Montes to interpret "Will it be a rose?" but the author of it asked the producer for an amount that he did not see fit. For this reason, Montes finally interprets some songs from Almonte that had also been received with great acceptance: "La Romera", written by a trio that had been interested in the voice of Gracia Montes: Ochaíta, Valerio and Solano. This trio of composers would also write for her the songs from Granada "Coplas del chapinero", "Una rosa colorá", "Speak with the eyes...!" or the sailor pasodoble "Cariá la Sanluqueña".

From the airwaves, Montes was discovered by talent scout José Brageli, who was a talent scout for figures from the show like Paquita Rico, Curro Romero or Mikaela. Launched under the stage name of Gracia Montes, she appeared before the Andalusian public with the show La Rosa de Andalucía, with a libretto by Ochaíta, Valerio and Solano. As exceptional spectators were in the crowded San Fernando Theatre, everyone agreed that Montes had a different voice. Then came the show Coplas al viento, with which she toured all of Spain. There, she shared the stage with reciter Gabriela Ortega, with creations by Ochaíta, Valerio and Solano.

=== 1960s ===
Montes began a retirement from show business when success had come, staying nine years out of her professional career for sentimental reasons. The year 1965 marked a milestone in her personal and artistic life. After her love break, she returns with La rosa de las marismas, original by Ochaíta, Valerio and Solano, who conducted the orchestra, with great success at the San Fernando Theatre in Seville. Themes such as the hymns "Sevilla leads the compass", "The girl from Punta Umbría", "The light of your cigar", "Words in the wind", "Los tientos míos" or the sevillanas rocieras that gave name belong to this period. For Montes, the flamenco rumba "Don't give me war" and the popular zambra "I'm afraid" were devised by these same authors. But for unknown reasons, Gracia did not get to record them on disc, she did not even include them in the repertoire that was part of the show with which she returned in 1965. Both creations were recorded by Rocío Jurado. Montes belonged to the aforementioned show, a zambra entitled: "Another thing, partner"; her verses defoliated her own life. She also sang "You are a good man", a classic Andalusian theme, or fandangos from Huelva and verdiales of auction "It was a sin of love" or the masterful rumba "Without thinking about it".

In 1966, Montes recorded two 45 rpm records, both written by Ochaíta and maestro Solano. In one of them, she included themes like "That day ..!" and "Your arms have held me." The other disc collected four saetas dedicated to brotherhoods and sisterhoods of Seville, with a flamenco quejío and a touch just right for this palo. In 1967, she re-recorded the song that made her a star: "¿Será una rosa?" This time she changed the orchestration for a guitar, clapping and jaleos. This same album includes another of her most important hits: "Viajera...!, written by Francisco de Val. A year later, Gracia Montes recorded another of her best-known songs, "Maruja Limón", a Flamenco rumba written by Quintero, León and Quiroga. It also included some bulerías dedicated to her home town of Lora del Río, which were titled "De Lora, ¡y olé!", by the same authors.

Following the most classic line of Andalusian song, in 1968, Montes recorded an album written by Rafael de León and maestro Quiroga. She performs "I'm afraid of the moon", an Andalusian romance that had previously been recorded by Concha Piquer, Estrellita Castro and Miguel de Molina. Next, she records another album with four flamenco rumbas. One of them achieved great acceptance: "Moscatel", dedicated to Chipiona, a town in Cádiz where she spent the summer. Around this time, when she was still living between Madrid and Barcelona, Montes made a program for TVE called Luces en la noche. In it, she interpreted hits she harvested such as "Maruja Limón", "La lumbre de tu cigarro", and "Moscatel".

=== 1970s ===
In 1972, Montes recorded her self-titled album (Columbia). It includes a poem by Rafael de León to which maestro Solano put music, called "Poema de mi soledad"; an Andalusian song written by the same authors, "Romero"; a bolero song entitled "Pídele a Dios", written by Armando Manzanero, and several songs by Manuel Alejandro. It also includes the love song "Primavera en otoño" and a song that she dedicated to her mother, so dear to Gracia Montes, "Esa mujercita".

In 1974, Montes published a studio album, entitled "Lo mejor de Sevilla". She sang to bullfighter Diego Puerta and the boxer Pedro Carrasco. He also toured Málaga and Seville, strolling through the birthplace of the Quintero family to stay in Lora del Río. Subsequently, he released an album under the same record label that included a flamenco rumba written by Rafael de León and Juan Solano that became a hymn of her artistic career: "Soy una feria", which gives the LP its title. But we must highlight a sonnet by Benítez Carrasco to which Juan Solano put music: "Puente de olvido" and a song dedicated to Málaga, as well as a song written for Montes by Julio Iglesias: "¡Vete ya!"

In 1976, Montes released another album, entitled Claveles en mayo, with songs written by Rafael de León and music by Juan Solano. It is necessary to emphasize in this album the orchestration that enhances the lyrics of the Sevillian poet. A year later, the Montes returns to her Andalusian roots with an album entitled "Nos parió Andalucía", with flamenco songs written by José María Jiménez, Bazán and García Tejero, among others. She interpreted cantes por soleá with a cantiña to finish off, tangos, various fandangos, verdiales, alegrías and a serrana, all of them accompanied on guitar by Paco Cepero.

In 1979, Montes left Columbia due to a disagreement with the record company, and released a new album called, Sueño y Pasión, under the Ámbar record label with songs in keeping with the new times and more modern airs without leaving behind her Andalusian roots. Some cantiñas from Cádiz stand out such as "Flor de papel", "Niña Colombina" and "Tú me hueles a flores". Other songs are Madre de un sueño" and "Acaso no fui yo". Despite the maturity of her voice, this album did not receive any type of promotion and went unnoticed by the public.

=== 1980s ===
In 1980, Ámbar released a new sevillanas album, entitled ¡Por Sevillanas!. It is highlighted by songs such as "Amores locos", "Te mira la niña" and above all "Viene Triana" and "Farolillos encendidos". The latter sang a love story set at the Seville Fair. This album did enjoy great popularity. Currently, "A Virgen del Rocío likes sevillanas..." performed by Coros Rocieros are still heard, although they were written by José Feliciano for Gracia Montes.

After a three-year absence, Montes returned to Columbia Records with a new album entitled Cuando Un Amor Se Termina. It includes songs written by Manuel Alejandro such as the title track and "Cuando digo tu nombre". It also features rumbas like "Naranja y limón and "Si supieras..." and bulerías like "Agua de paso". In this album Montes covers the Peruvian waltz "Caballo de paso", which she presented in the program Estudio abierto presented by José María Íñigo.

After a few years, when Andalusian regional television began its broadcast (1988-1989), journalist Carlos Herrera presented the program Las coplas, with an orchestration directed by maestro Eduardo Leyva. Montes interpreted "Cariá la Sanluqueña", "Poema de mi soledad", "Claveles en mayo" and "Palabritas en el viento". At the piano, she reviewed her classics "Soy una feria", "La lumbre de tu cigarro" and "Romero", all of them written for her by Juan Solano, who appeared in the program at the end of the first part of the program. On 27 April 1988, the joint concert ¡Viva la tonadilla! with Gracia Montes, Juanita Reina and Marifé de Triana, paid tribute to maestro Manuel Quiroga.

=== Later career ===
Two years later, in 1990, Montes returned to the studio to prepare a new album, which was released by the Seville-based label Senador. It also includes an April version of the zambra written for Gracia de Triana in 1945 entitled "No me quieras tanto"", by Quintero, León and Quiroga. This album includes pasodobles such as "La copla sigui adelante" or "Pastora Pavón", dedicated to the flamenco singing teacher. A Sevillian-themed rumba appears dubbed "Niña mía", love songs like "A rienda suelta" and "El amor somos tú y yo", as well as "Una barca llamada España", with airs of bulería. With this record she took part in the program ¡Querida Concha! presented by Concha Velasco and Sabor a Lolas, along with Lola Flores and her daughter Lolita Flores.

Her last work, "A ti, madre", released by Senador in 2002, contains revisions of songs from her discography such as "Cariá, la Sanluqueña" and "Palitos de Ron", as well as versions of "Puerto Camaronero", "La Falsa Moneda" or "España Canta", classics by Estrellita Castro and Imperio Argentina.

In 2006, Montes was hospitalized urgently, due to a brain aneurysm, from which she fully and satisfactorily recovered. In 2016, the documentary "Gracia Montes, la voz de cristal" was released, directed by Jesús Peña, in which various artists participated to pay homage to Montes, made in 2016 with the script and writing by Juliana López, the collaboration of Lora del Río City Council, as well as the transfer of graphic material by researchers Álvaro Beltrán and Jacob Benjumea.

== Death ==
Montes died on 2 June 2022 at her home on Calle Asunción in Seville, at the age of 86.[24][25] Her death marked the end of a career spanning nearly five decades, during which she became one of the distinctive voices of copla and Andalusian music. She was buried at the San Sebastián Municipal Cemetery in her hometown of Lora del Río, where local authorities and admirers paid tribute to her life and artistic legacy.

== Selected discography ==
- 1966: ¡Ese día!
- 1967: ¿Será una rosa?
- 1976: Lo mejor de Sevilla
- 2002: A ti, madre
