= Penda Dallé =

Cameroonian artist and musician (1958–2022)

- Born: Tete Dallé Penda Jeannot; 1958; French Cameroon
- Died: 26 December 2022 (aged 64); Paris, France
- Occupations: Artist; Musician

Tete Dallé Penda Jeannot, known by his stage name Penda Dallé, (1958 – 26 December 2022) was a Cameroonian artist and musician. He gained notoriety in the 1980s thanks to the rise of television and the golden age of Makossa.

== Biography ==
Tete Dallé Penda Jeannot was born in 1958. He began his musical career in the 1970s, playing guitar in the group Les New-Stars, originally from Bonadibong, Douala. In 1976, at the age of 18, he joined the Cameroon Armed Forces, where he stayed for four years and played in the naval band.

An excellent guitarist, Dallé notably played for Emile Kangué. He began his solo career in 1980 and released the single 45 tours Se to mba / Ne nde muna musango. Alongside Kangué, he formed the group La Musette.

Penda Dallé died in Paris on 26 December 2022, at the age of 64.

== Discography ==
- Bonadibong
