= Gianluca Floris =

Italian writer and belcanto singer (1964–2022)

Gianluca Floris (12 June 1964 – 4 February 2022) was an Italian writer and bel canto singer.

He featured in several recordings for Naxos Records, including playing the role of Bardolfo in a recording of Falstaff made at the Teatro del Maggio Musicale Fiorentino, Florence in 2006.

Floris died on 4 February 2022, at the age of 57.

== Works ==
- I Maestri Cantori, Nuoro, Il Maestrale 2000
- Lato Destro, Cagliari, CUEC 2006.
- La preda, collana Colorado Noir, Milano, Mondadori 2006
- L'inferno peggiore, Milano, PIEMME 2009
