= Los Van Van =

Cuban musical group

Los Van Van is one of the leading musical groups of post-revolutionary Cuba. It was founded in 1969 by bassist Juan Formell, who directed the band until his death in 2014. Formell and former band members Changuito and Pupy are some of the most important figures in contemporary Cuban music, having contributed to the development of songo and timba, two popular dance music genres.

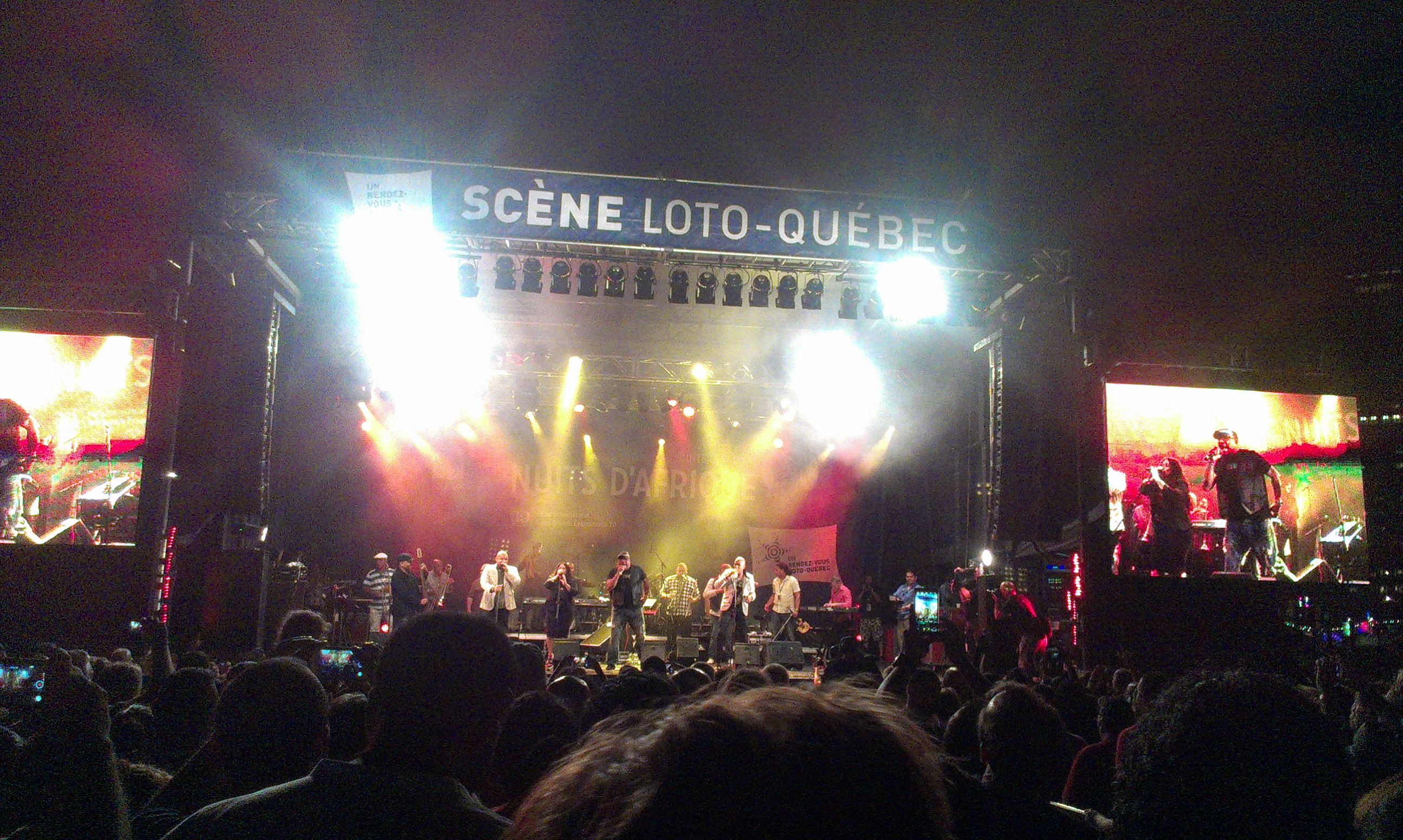
Los Van Van

== History ==
In 1967, Formell became musical director of Elio Revé's charanga orchestra. The sound of Orquesta Revé at that time was a unique blend of Cuban son and late-'60s rock. Formell reformed the group into Changui '68, and then founded his own group, Los Van Van, on December 4, 1969.

[Juan Formell] was convinced that he could capture the imagination of Cuba's younger generation by infusing Revé's arrangements with elements of North American rock and roll, creating an odd new style that he called changüí 68. Early the next year, almost exactly a decade after Revé's band had jumped ship to form [Orquesta] Ritmo Oriental, . . . Formell incited the most famous of the Revé mutinies and absconded with the majority of the musicians to form a group which has stayed at the true leading edge of its country's music longer than any other . . . at first Formell relied heavily on the songs and stylistic tendencies of his previous work with Revé. The harmonies, never before heard in Cuban music, were clearly borrowed from North American pop—in some cases rather corny North American pop . . . their sudden commercial popularity shattered the formulaic limitations on harmony to which Cuban popular music had faithfully adhered for so long . . . rhythmically, the 1969 group made the transition from changüí 68 to the first incarnation of a style which Formell called songo (Moore 2011).

The original personnel of Los Van Van were Juan Formell (leader, bass guitar, vocals); Orlando Canto (flute); Raúl "El Yulo" Cárdenas (congas); Blas Egües (drum kit); Luis Marsilli (cello); José Luis Martínez (electric guitar, vocals); Julio Noroña (güiro); Pupy Pedroso (keyboard); Miguel Angel "Lele" Rasalps (vocals); William Sánchez (electric guitar); and Gerardo Miró, Jesús Linare, Fernando Leyva, and Iván Rocha (violins).

Juan Formell states that the main piano guajeo of "La lucha"'s (1969) montuno section was inspired by the Afro‐Cuban folkloric batá drum rhythm chachalokefún.

=== 1970s ===
José Luis "Changuito" Quintana replaced Egües in 1970. Changuito greatly expanded the parameters of songo, and introduced a revolutionary conga and timbales technique, by incorporating snare drum rudiments. Changuito is the most influential Cuban percussionist of the latter twentieth century.

Changuito's rhythmic contributions coincided with Formell's maturation as a songwriter and LVV launched into a six year period which alone would have been sufficient to establish them as one of Cuba's most important bands. LVV's recordings from 1970 to 1976 are the definite starting point for anyone seeking to learn about the enigmatic genre of songo (Moore 2011).

The original single of "Pero a mi manera" (c. 1972) introduced harmonies and arranging ideas never before used in Latin music. Moore describes the chord changes as: "addictive and harmonically ambiguous vamp for the entire montuno section. Arguments could be made for various keys, but to me it sounds like bIII – IV – I – bVI in A. Like the best rock vamps, it never quite resolves, allowing for endless repetitions without losing energy."

In 1974 Los Van Van released their landmark record Tránsito (LD-3421) [Los Van Van v. II]. Also that year, vocalist Pedro Calvo left Orquesta Ritmo Oriental to join Los Van Van. Calvo fronted the band for two decades. Los Van Van v. V (Areíto LD-378) (1979) premiered compositions by Pedro Calvo, José Luis "El Tosco" Cortés, and Pupy Pedroso, who would go on to become the group's second most prolific composer after Formell.

Some of Formell's songo inventions had onbeat, rock-like guajeos as well as rock harmonies. One such song is "Con el bate de aluminio" (1979). The right hand plays steady onbeats, sounding a rock‐influenced imi – bVII – bVI chord progression.

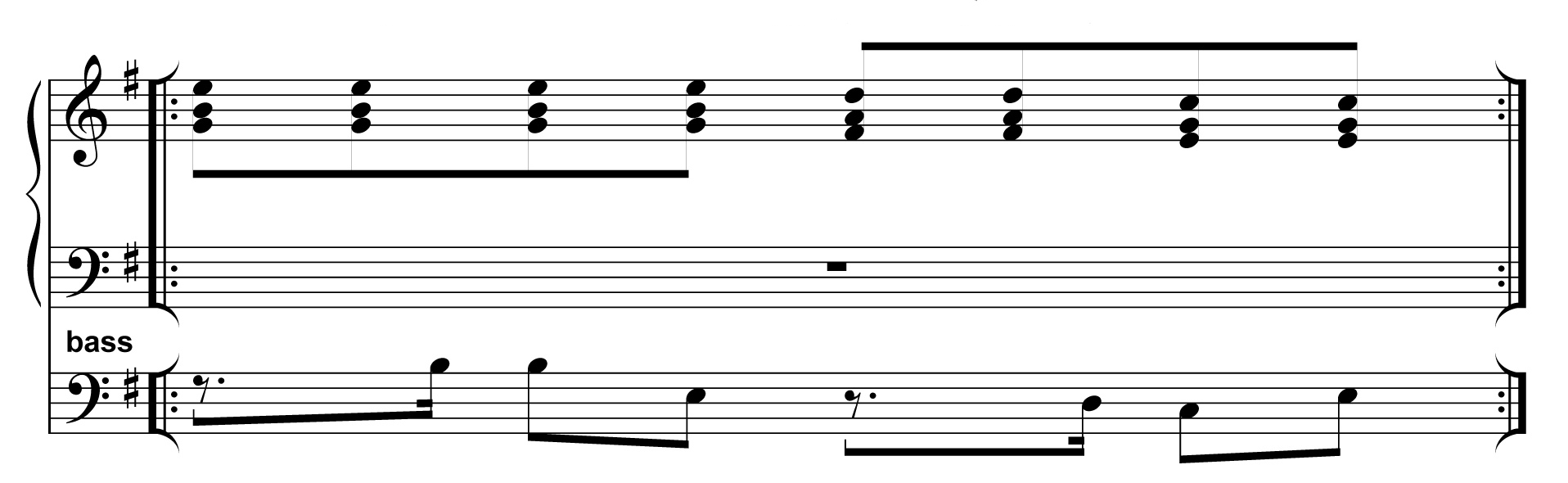
"Con el bate de aluminio" (1979)

=== 1980s ===
On Los Van Van v. 6 (1980) Formell took the unusual step of adding trombones to his charanga format. Orquesta Revé did the same during the time.

On El baile del buey cansao (Areíto LD-4045) [Los Van Van v. VII] (1982), Changuito added timbales, which he altered with drum kit. With their 1984 release of Anda ven y muévete (Areíto LD-4164) [Los Van Van v. IX], Van Van began getting unprecedented international attention. The title track borrows heavily from Lionel Richie's hit "All Night Long." Salsa singer Rubén Blades later covered "Muévete."

The following piano guajeo is based on Los Van Van’s biggest hit of the 1980s, "Por encima del nivel," better known as "La sandunguera," one of Los Van Van's most popular songs from the 1980s.

=== 2010s ===
In 2011, they collaborated with Carlinhos Brown to record the song "Soy Loco por Tí, América" for the Red Hot Organization's most recent charitable album Red Hot + Rio 2. The album is a follow-up to the 1996 Red Hot + Rio. Proceeds from the sales were donated to raise awareness and money to fight AIDS/HIV and related health and social issues.

== Musical style ==
Using a charanga line-up (flute, string instruments, and rhythm section) as its base, Los Van Van added trombones, and was the first Cuban group to use synthesizers and drum machines. Initially, their sound was a fusion of son montuno, rumba, and North American rock and pop. Later the band incorporated funk, disco, and hip hop, as well as salsa. These influences would first give rise to a style known as songo, and later timba.

Los Van Van has consistently adapted its style to the times, and remains, after 35 years, Cuba's most popular dance band. Along with pianist Cesar "Pupy" Pedroso, Juan Formell has written some of the most intriguing verses in popular dance music, including stories that run over several albums and, contrary to trends in timba, all types of social commentary. Both artists are undisputed masters of double-entendre in a musical culture where multiple meanings in lyrics are pervasive. Indeed, the title of the band is probably meant to evoke the novel and compelling rhythms of the new sound of Formell's band, as van in Spanish means "they go" and so the name of the band could be translated as "those they go, they go" (it has also been suggested to translate as their name as something like "the go-gos!"). When Cesar "Pupy" Pedroso, their pianist and founding member, left the band in 2002 he founded his own band Pupy y los que son son, which is likely a name with a triple-entendre. The word son can mean both "they are" and also refers to the traditional music son (the same Latin root as "sound"), originating in the eastern provinces of Cuba, from which Cuban-style salsa may have originated. It is also a reference to the idiomatic Spanish expression "those who can, do" presumably as sort of a sly nod to the expression "those who cannot [do something], teach."

== Awards ==
The band has a Latin Grammy Award nomination to their credit, to Best Salsa Album for Llegó Van Van ('Van Van Is Here') in the first Latin Grammy Awards ceremony (2000).

In January 2010 "A Cali," a song from Van Van's latest album, was selected as one of the winning songs of the 2009 Cali Fair held in Cali (Colombia), a city known as Colombia's "salsa capital". The selection was made through a public poll that registered 30,742 votes. Van Van's "A Cali" received 7,905 of the votes, or 26% of the total.

The Cuban band was honored for the organizer comite of WOMEX fair with the Artist Award 2013. The laurel was given to the "Train of Cuban music" for having remained the most important and popular dance band in Cuba for more than four decades. The jury noted that "the imaginative approach in implementing its director Juan Formell, brought new sounds and ideas in Cuban dance music, which merged violins, flute charanga style with a trombone section, drums and electric guitar intro, bass and keyboards".

Juan Formell was also awarded with the Latin Grammy Award for Excellence 2013 along with other renowned Hispanic musicians, in a ceremony held on November 20, 2013 in Las Vegas.

== Band members ==
Los Van Van has been a school for outstanding singers and musicians. Past members with successful careers as solo artists include Pedro Calvo, Angel Bonne, Changuito, José Luis "El Tosco" Cortés (founder of the first timba band NG La Banda), César "Pupy" Pedroso and others. As of 2006, Los Van Van's lineup of singers was Mayito Rivera, Roberto Hernandez "Roberton", Yeni Valdes and Lele Rosales. During 2011 Mayito Rivera left the band for a solo career and was replaced by Mandy Cantero. Since early January 2017, Yeni Valdes left the band.

== Discography ==
- Los Van Van Vol I (1969)
- Los Van Van Vol II (1973)
- Los Van Van Vol III (1974)
- Los Van Van Vol IV (1976)
- Los Van Van Vol V (1979)
- Los Van Van Vol VI (1981)
- Báilalo ¡Eh! ¡Ah! (1982)
- Qué Pista (1983)
- Anda, Ven y Muévete (1984)
- La Habana Sí (1985)
- Eso Que Anda (1986)
- Sandunguera (1986)
- La Titimania (1987)
- Songo (1988)
- El Negro No Tiene Na' (1988)
- Songo (Mango, 1989)
- Rico Son (1989)
- Aquí... El Que Baila Gana (1990)
- Esto Está Bueno (1991)
- De Cuba Los Van Van (1991)
- Azúcar (Xenophile Records, 1992)
- Bailando Mojao - Dancing Wet (1993)
- 25 Años... y seguimos ahí! Vol I (1994)
- Lo Ultimo En Vivo (Qbadisc Records, 1994)
- ¡Ay Dios, Ampárame! (1995)
- Live In America (1997)
- Te Pone La Cabeza Mala (1997)
- Llegó Van Van (1999)
- En El Malecón De La Habana (2003)
- Chapeando (2004)
- Aquí El que Baila Gana: El Concierto (DVD+CD, 2007)
- Arrasando (2008)
- Live From Camagüey (2009)
- La Maquinaria (2011)
- La Fantasía (2014)
- Legado (2018)
- Mi Songo (2020)
- Modo Van Van (2023)
