= Tito Matos =

Puerto Rican percussionist (1968–2022)

Héctor René "Tito" Matos Otero (June 15, 1968 in Santurce, Puerto Rico– January 18, 2022 in San Juan, Puerto Rico) was a Puerto Rican percussionist. He played the requinto drum, a key instrument in plena music. He was one of the founders of La Maquina Insular and Viento de Agua. According to the Smithsonian Institution, he is considered “one of the best requinto players of his generation.”
