= Viento de Agua =

Bomba and plena band

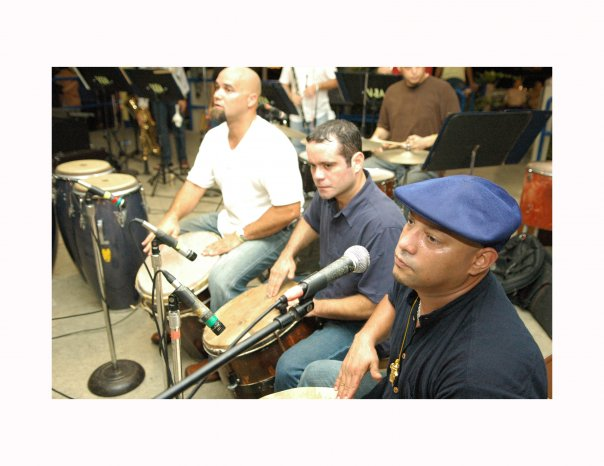
Viento de agua playing bomba drums.

Viento de Agua is a contemporary bomba and plena band, created in New York City in 1997. Bomba and plena are musical genres within the Afro-Puerto Rican tradition. Their first album, De Puerto Rico al Mundo, was selected among the Top 10 Latin albums of the year by The New York Times.

The band was created by Puerto Rican musicians Tito Matos (percussion, vocals, composer, arranger), Ricardo Pons (flute, saxs, arranger) and Alberto Toro (sax, arranger). It is a 13-member band that includes drums, bass and a powerful brass section. It has two published albums, one of them, Materia Prima (Raw Material) was produced by the Smithsonian Institution's music label Folkways Records. They have performed at Lincoln Center Out of Doors, Celebrate Brooklyn! and the Kennedy Center in Washington DC, and other venues.

The group's percussionists, led by Tito Matos, recorded Ricky Martin's single "Pégate", the singer's only plena recording.
