= Helen Golden (singer) =

Dutch singer (1940–2022)

- Born: Helen Werkman; 1940; Enschede, Netherlands
- Died: 6 April 2022 (aged 81); Netherlands
- Occupation: Singer

Helen Golden, stage name of Helen Werkman (1940 – 6 April 2022), was a Dutch singer.

== Early life ==
Werkman was born in Enschede in 1940. Together with her husband Fred Gaasbeek, a pianist-entertainer and songwriter, she formed the duo Helen & Fred, since the 1960s. When her husband started the Freddy Golden Orchestra in 1967, with which he accompanies various radio and TV shows, she was one of the regular singers. Apart from that, Golden was long the lead singer of the Cotton Town Jazz Band.

== Career ==
In the 1960s Helen recorded and performed with her husband Fred. In 1966 the duo had a hit with another Dutch husband-and-wife duo, Gert & Hermien Timmerman. Their single Corsica d'Amore spent nine weeks in de Dutch Top 40.

Golden's first solo single was called Niemand Is Meer Eenzaam / Denk Aan Die Dag in 1977 (in collaboration with the Dutch Police Male Choir "Enschede's Politie Mannenkoor").

In 1986, her LP album My Life For A Song was released.

== Death ==
Golden died on 6 April 2022. She suffered from Alzheimer's disease.
