= Carol Arnauld =

French singer and songwriter (1961–2022)

- Born: Carol Valère; 28 March 1961; Bagnolet, Seine, France
- Died: 9 September 2022 (aged 61) Chalon-sur-Saône, France
- Genres: Pop
- Occupations: Singer, songwriter
- Years active: 1986–1987

Carol Arnauld (28 March 1961 – 9 September 2022) was a French singer and songwriter. She sang in the late 1980s and can be deemed as a one-hit wonder in France with her hit single "C'est pas facile...", released in September 1986. The song reached number 10 on the SNEP chart, stayed in the top 50 for 16 weeks and was certified Silver disc for 250,000 copies sold. Very moving, the song deals with her brother's death, killed by a reckless driver, and evokes her suffering and that of her mother. Arnauld published this song on her first album, self-titled Carol Arnauld, which contains songs about various situations of the life, such as infertility, divorce, and nostalgia for childhood. Her second and last album Temps denses was released in 1992 but didn't chart very well. Carol Arnauld died of cancer at the age of 61 on 9 September 2022.

== Discography ==
=== Studio albums ===
- 1986 : Carol Arnauld Polydor, Céline Music
- 1992 : Temps dense WMD

=== Singles ===
- 1986 : "C'est pas facile..." – #10 in France, Silver disc
- 1987 : "J'ai grandi trop vite"
- 1987 : "Donne moi" (Avec Jacky Brown)
- 1988 : "Toi qui voulais un enfant"
- 1989 : "Musique black"
- 1992 : "Si tu pars..."

=== Collaborations ===
- 1988 : 75 Artistes pour le Liban (compilation)
