= Bob DeMeo =

American drummer (1955–2022)

- Born: July 22, 1955; New York City, U.S.
- Died: February 12, 2022 (aged 66); New York City, U.S.
- Occupation: Drummer

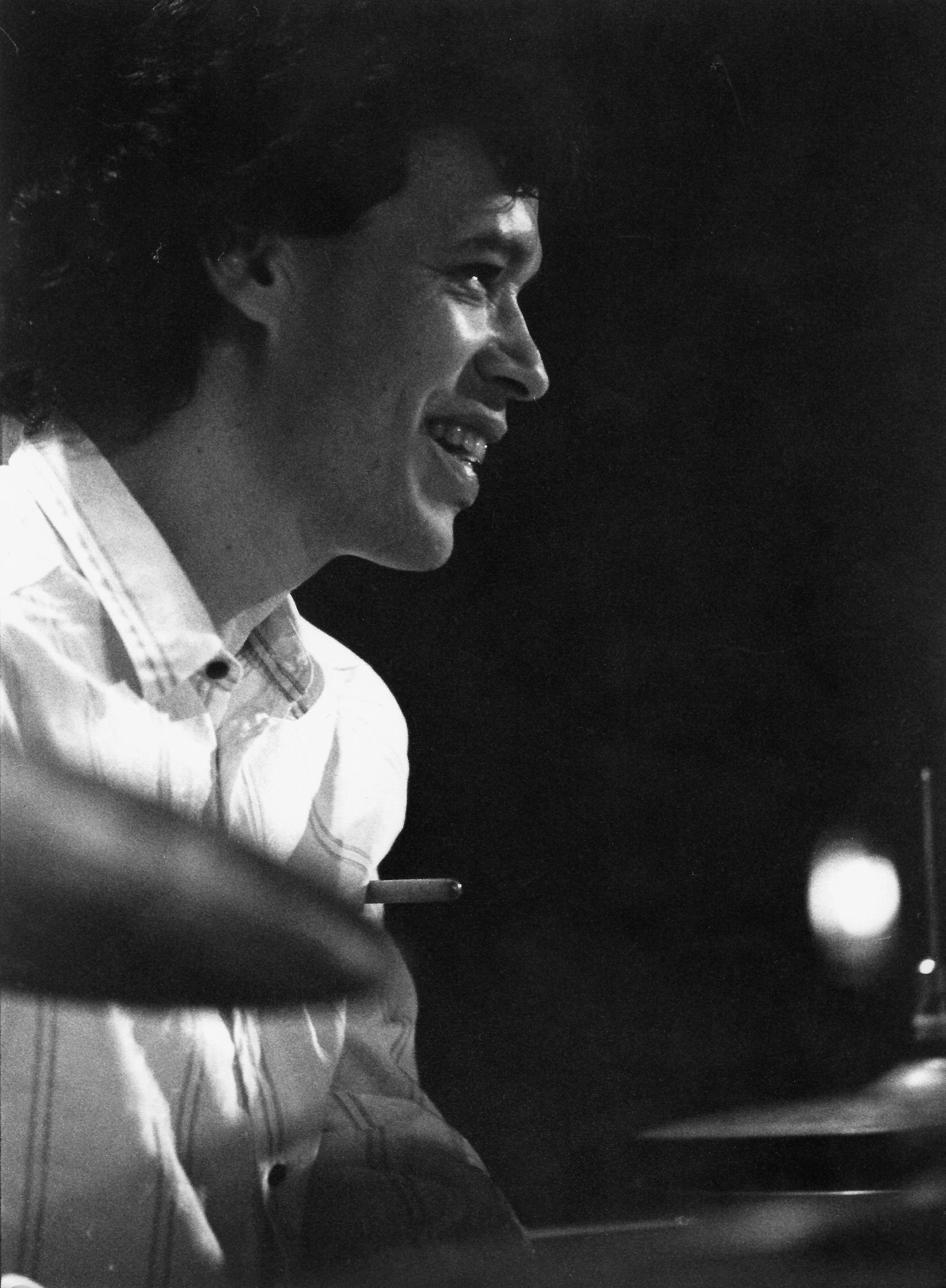
Bob DeMeo, jazz drummer

Bob DeMeo (July 22, 1955 – February 12, 2022) was an American jazz drummer.

== Biography ==
DeMeo became a studio musician with Blue Note Records in the early 1980s. His first recordings were made in New York City with Artie Simmons and The Jazz Samaritans. He accompanied artists such as George Benson, Nancy Wilson, and Jon Hendricks. He then moved to Paris, where he worked alongside Michel Graillier and Hal Singer for ten years. Between 1980 and 1997, he was involved in six recording sessions with Julie Monley, Kerem Görsev, and Eric Revis. He also produced recordings with the Sedition Ensemble and Bobby Few. Upon his return to New York, he often performed at Smalls Jazz Club in a quartet alongside Grant Stewart, Neal Kirkwood, and Tyler Mitchell.

DeMeo died on February 12, 2022, at the age of 66.
