= María José Cantilo =

Argentine singer and songwriter (1953–2022)

- Born: María de los Ángeles Cantilo; 5 June 1953; Belgrano, Buenos Aires, Argentina
- Died: 2 May 2022 (aged 68) El Bolsón, Río Negro, Argentina
- Genres: Folk rock
- Occupations: Singer; songwriter
- Instruments: Vocals; guitar

María José Cantilo (5 June 1953 – 2 May 2022) was an Argentine singer and songwriter.

== Life ==
Cantilo was born in the neighbourhood of Belgrano to a large family of ten siblings. Her older brother Miguel Cantilo is also a rock musician. She started playing the guitar at the age of seven and composed her first song at the age of seventeen. In her adolescence, she travelled to the house on Calle Conesa (the famous house of her brother Miguel who gave his name to a Pedro y Pablo album) where musicians such as Moris, Pappo, Roque Narvaja, Miguel Abuelo, Kubero Díaz and Jorge Pinchevsky were regulars. In the seventies, she moved to El Bolsón to experience community life and contact with nature.

Cantilo returned to the province of Buenos Aires in 1982 and in that same year she began her artistic career. With an acoustic folk rock style, she recorded her self-titled debut album in 1984, with the participation of great musicians such as David Lebón, León Gieco, Osvaldo Fattorusso, Daniel Colombres and her brother Miguel Cantilo, among others. It was part of the B.A. Rock and La Falda, where she sang only accompanied by her acoustic guitar. In 1989, she released her second album entitled "En banda" and Oscar Moro, Claudio "Pato" Loza, Gustavo Dinerstain, Angel Lombardo, Diego Gesualdi and others participated. In May 1990, she appeared on the cover of Playboy magazine (Argentina edition).

In February 1992, Cantilo was arrested for drug trafficking and sentenced to two years and eight months at Ezeiza prison. She captured this experience in a book published sometime after her release.

In 2000, Cantilo began a slow return to music with sporadic performances, which would become more frequent with the editions of "Covers" released that same year, "Momento de boleros" in 2005 and "Aquí y Tiempo" in 2006. In September 2004, she participated in a new version of "La Marcha de la Bronca" with her brother Miguel and special guests. In 2011, she released an album entitled "Esencia" that was produced by her son Gaspar Benegas (guitarist of Indio Solari) respecting the simplicity of the sound of her voice and her guitar that was her characteristic.

== Death ==
Cantilo died in El Bolsón on 2 May 2022, aged 68.

== Discography ==
- 1984: "María José Cantilo"
- 1989: "En banda"
- 1995: "Gota a gota"
- 1999: "Sai Ram"
- 2000: "Covers - Bossanova y Jazz"
- 2004: "Feeling saudades"
- 2005: "Momentos de boleros"
- 2006: "Aquí y ahora"
- 2011: "Esencia"
