= César Pedroso =

Cuban pianist (1946–2022)

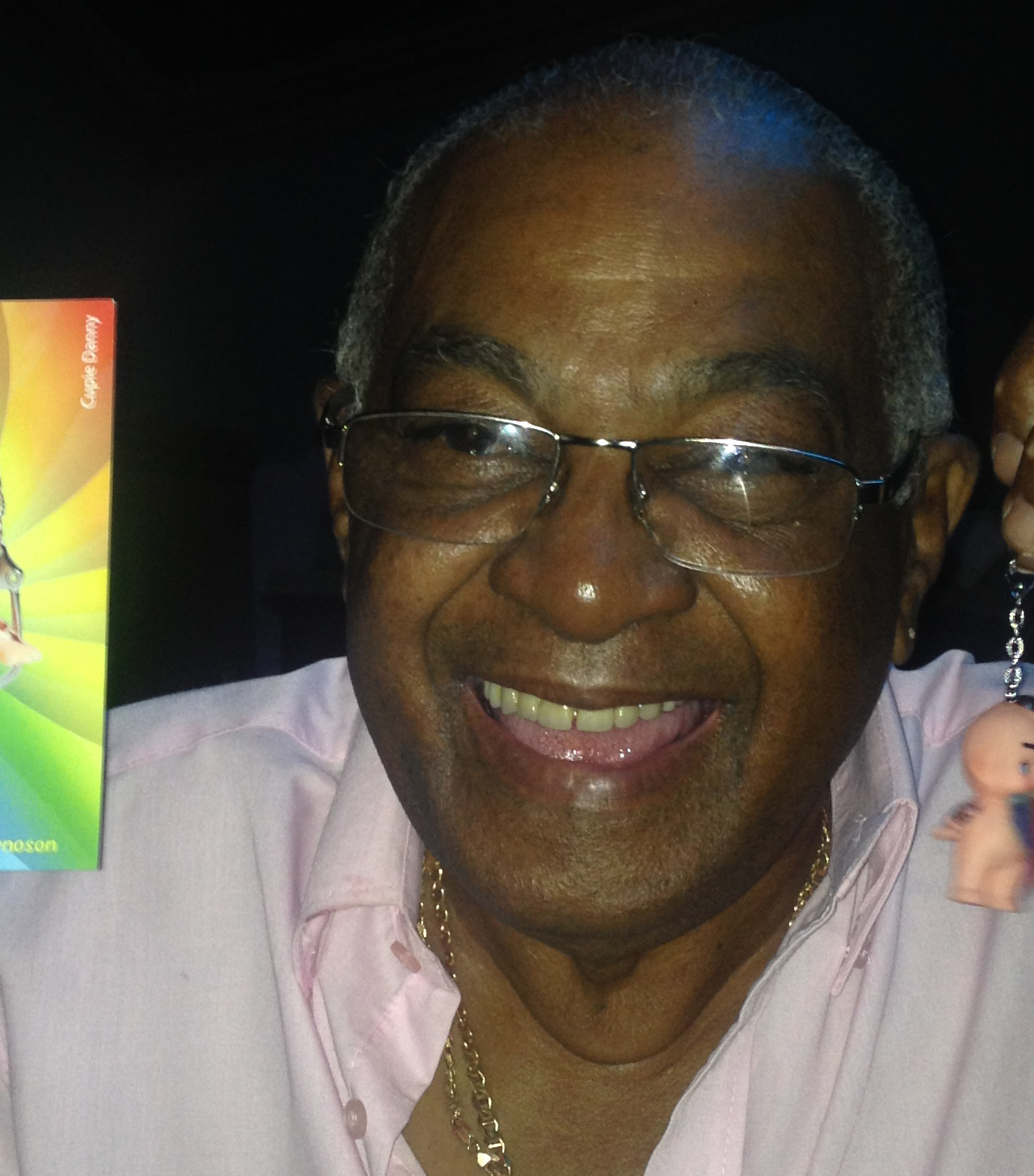
- Born: César de las Mercedes Pedroso Fernández; 24 September 1946; Cuba
- Died: 17 July 2022 (aged 75); Cuba
- Other names: Pupy
- Occupation: Pianist
- Organizations: Pupy y Los que Son, Son; Los Van Van

César "Pupy" Pedroso (born César de las Mercedes Pedroso Fernández; 24 September 1946 – 17 July 2022) was a Cuban pianist who became famous with Orquesta Revé and then as a founding member of Los Van Van. For many years, Pedroso wrote some of Van Van's most important songs such as "Calla Calla", "Tranquilo, Mota", "Seis Semanas", "El buenagente" and many others. In 2001, he founded his own band Pupy y Los que Son, Son. In 2006, he recorded four albums with his band.

== Musicians ==
- César "Pupy" Pedroso / MUSICAL DIRECTOR AND PIANO ---
- José Gómez Martínez / LEAD VOCALS ---
- Armando Cantero Abreu / LEAD VOCALS ---
- Alexander Luis Lara Dedieu / LEAD VOCALS ---
- Geraldo Miró Rivera / VIOLÍN ---
- Osiris Martínez Rodríguez / KEYBOARD ---
- Reinier Elizarde Ruanio / BASS ---
- Jose Luis Quintana Fuerte / PAD ---
- Roelvis Reyes Simono / DRUMS ---
- René Suárez Zapata / TIMBALES ---
- Julio Noroña Pérez / GÜIRO ---
- Jorge Castillo Hernández / CONGAS ---
- Leonardo Tereuel Velásquez / TRUMPET ---
- Juan Carlos Gonzales Borrero / TRUMPET ---
- Sergio R Luna Longchamp / TROMBONE ---
- Neuris Lorenzo Mustelier / TROMBONE ---
