= Dennis East =

South African songwriter (c. 1949 – 2022)

- Born: c. 1949
- Origin: South Africa
- Died: 12 September 2022 (aged 73)
- Occupations: Songwriter, music producer
- Years active: 1971–2022

Dennis East (c. 1949 – 12 September 2022) was a South African songwriter and musical producer originally from Pietermaritzburg. He started his musical career in the late 1960s. He performed with The Rising Sons in the 1970s, and formed the rock band Stingray with other South African musicians in 1979. In addition to his work as a songwriter, he has also produced musical albums for South African artists as well as British saxophonist Andrew Young and participated in television programmes such as Pump Up The Volume, Coca Cola Pop Stars and Popstars 2010.

East wrote the song "Trouble" which was recorded by Australian singer John Farnham in 1986 for the album Whispering Jack, which is the second-best-selling album in Australia.

== Discography ==
=== Singles ===
- "Ouch" / "This Rolling Stone" (1972)
- "Could You Ever Love Me Again" / "Listen" (1973)
- "A Rose Has To Die" / "You're Gonna Love Yourself in the Morning" (1974)
- "A Little Bit Wiser" / "You Lied" (1975)
- "A Million Drums" / "Give A Little Love" (1976)
- "Stone Walls" / "Everything You Are" (1977)
- "Love into Lonely" / "Don't Take It Away" (1977)
- "Wildflower" / "Blue Smiling Eyes" (1978)
- "Red Hot Lover" / "A Rich Life" (1982)
- "This One For Dancing" / "Face The Fire" (1983)
- "Children on the Run" / "Prisoner" (1983)
- "Love Is The Key" / "The Old Dog" (1984)
- "He's A Good Time" / "The Survivors" (1984)
- "Love Manoeuvres (Fight for the Lady)" / "Running Back For More" (1985)
- "Reach for the Sky" (1985)
- "Peace Will Be Mine" / "The Meek Shall Inherit" (1986)
- "Genevieve" (1987)
- "Talking in Your Sleep" / "I'll Mend Your Broken Heart" (1988)

=== Albums ===
- Stone Walls (1977)
- Greatest Hits (1978)
- From Me to You (1988)
- With Good Reason (1990)
- So Far (1991)
- 20 Greatest Hits (2000)
- You (2007)
- Collections - Dammit I Love You (2008)
- Take My Heart (2010)
