= Aziouz Raïs =

Algerian singer (1954–2022)

- Born: 25 August 1954; Blida, French Algeria
- Died: 10 December 2022 (aged 68)
- Occupation: Singer
- Years active: 1969–2022

Aziouz Raïs (Arabic: عزيوز رايس; 25 August 1954 – 10 December 2022) was an Algerian chaabi singer. He began performing at marriage celebrations in 1969 and rose to success in the 1990s.

Raïs died from a stroke on 10 December 2022, at the age of 68.
