= Osayomore Joseph =

Nigerian musician (1952–2022)

Amb Osayomore Joseph
- Born: 29 October 1952; Ugha village near Benin City, Nigeria
- Died: 11 June 2022 (aged 69) University of Benin Teaching Hospital, Nigeria
- Genres: Folk, World, & Country
- Occupations: Musician
- Years active: 1970–2022
- Labels: Sonny Records (2), Utosco Audio & Video Centre, Sonnidisk Records

Osayomore Joseph (29 October 1952 – 11 June 2022) was a Nigerian musician who was one of the early pioneers of African popular Highlife music, known for his anti-corruption and government critical lyrics.

== Career ==
Osayomore Joseph was born in Ugha village near Benin City, Nigeria, on 29 October 1952. He started his music career in the Nigerian Army Band during the 1970s.

== Death ==
Osayomore Joseph died at University of Benin Teaching Hospital in Nigeria as a result of stroke.

== Discography ==
Albums	Label	
Forever (Cass, Album)	Utosco Audio & Video Centre	UAVC 063
My Name Is Money (LP)	Sonny Records (2)	SOR 004
Fire On The Mountain (LP, Album)	Sonnidisk Records	SDR 030
