= 2022 in Latin music =

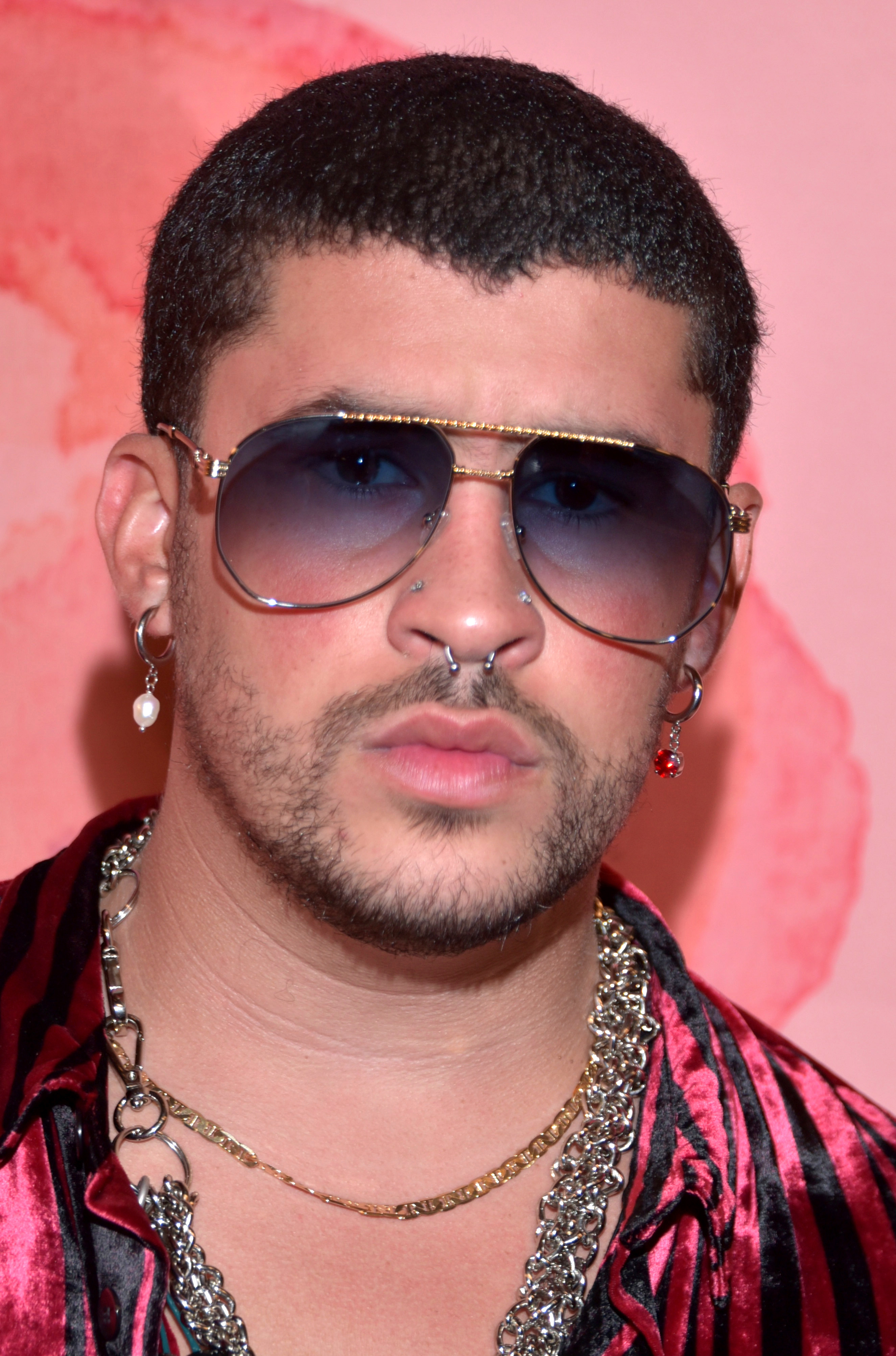
Puerto Rican rapper Bad Bunny was named Top Latin Artist of the Year in the United States by Billboard for the fourth time in a row.

The following is a list of events and new Spanish and Portuguese-language music that happened in 2022 in the Latin music industry. Latin regions include Ibero-America, Spain, Portugal, and the United States.

== Events ==
=== January–March ===
- January 13 – The lineup for the returning edition of Coachella includes Anitta, Banda MS, Chicano Batman, Ed Maverick, Karol G, Natanael Cano, Nathy Peluso, Nicki Nicole, Omar Apollo, Pabllo Vittar, and The Marías.
- January 24 – Edén Muñoz announces departure from Calibre 50 to launch a solo career.
- January 29 – "SloMo" by Chanel wins the first edition of the Benidorm Fest and will represent Spain in the 66th edition of the Eurovision Song Contest.
- February 4 – Clamor by Maria Arnal i Marcel Bagès is named the best album in Spain of 2021 by winning the Premio Ruido.
- February 8 – "Ay mamá" by Rigoberta Bandini becomes the first song that failed to represent Spain in Eurovision to top the country's chart since "Lo Malo" by Aitana and Ana Guerra in 2018.
- February 12 – "Te Espera el Mar" by María José Llergo, from Mediterraneo: The Law of the Sea, wins the Goya Award for Best Original Song.
- February 16 – José Manuel Pérez Tornero, president of RTVE, announces Hispavisión, the Iberoamerican adaptation of the Eurovision Song Contest after the cancellation of the OTI Festival in 2000.
- February 24 – The 34th Annual Lo Nuestro Awards are held at the FTX Arena in Miami, Florida.
  - El Último Tour del Mundo wins Album of the Year.
  - "Bichota" by Karol G wins Song of the Year.
  - Bad Bunny wins Artist of the Year.
  - El Alfa wins Best New Male Artist.
  - Ángela Aguilar wins Best New Female Artist.
- March 2 – Karol G is awarded the Rule Breaker award at Billboard's Women in Music, marking the second time a Spanish-singing artist is awarded by the institution since Rosalía in 2019.
- March 15 – The 3rd Annual Premios Odeón take place in Madrid.
  - El Madrileño by C. Tangana wins Album of the Year.
  - "Tiroteo" by Marc Seguí, Pol Granch and Rauw Alejandro wins Song of the Year.
  - "Tiroteo" by Marc Seguí, Pol Granch and Rauw Alejandro wins Video of the Year.
  - Belén Aguilera wins Best New Artist.
- March 18 – Maná's concert residency at LA Forum begins.
- March 19 – With 16.3 million worldwide streams, Motomami by Rosalía becomes the most-streamed female Spanish-language album in a single day as well as the best performing album by a Spanish artist on Spotify Spain.
- March 21 – Daddy Yankee announces retirement from music after 32 years plus a finale album, Legendaddy, and a farewell tour visiting the Americas in 2022.
- March 22 – The 10th iHeartRadio Music Awards take place at the Shrine Auditorium in Los Angeles.
  - "Pepas" by Farruko wins Latin Pop/Reggaeton Song of the Year
  - Bad Bunny wins Best Latin Artist
  - Grupo Firme wins Best New Latin Artist
  - "La Casita" by Banda MS wins Regional Mexican Song of the Year
  - Calibre 50 wins Regional Mexican Artist of the Year

=== April–June ===
- April 3 – The 64th Annual Grammy Awards take place at MGM Grand Garden Arena in Las Vegas.
  - Mendó by Alex Cuba wins Best Latin Pop Album.
  - Orígen by Juanes wins Best Latin Rock or Alternative Album.
  - A Mis 80's by Vicente Fernández wins Best Regional Mexican Music Album.
  - El Último Tour Del Mundo by Bad Bunny wins Best Música Urbana Album
  - Salswing! by Rubén Blades and Roberto Delgado & Orquesta wins Best Tropical Latin Album.
  - Mirror Mirror by Eliane Elias with Chick Corea & Chucho Valdés wins Best Latin Jazz Album.
- April 21 – The Latin American Music Awards of 2022 take place at Michelob Ultra Arena in Las Vegas.
  - KG0516 by Karol G wins Album of the Year
  - "Dakiti" by Bad Bunny and Jhay Cortez wins Song of the Year
  - Karol G wins Artist of the Year
  - María Becerra wins New Artist of the Year
- April 27 – The 14th Premios MIN take place at the Navarra Arena in Pamplona to celebrate the best in Spanish independent music.
  - Puta by Zahara wins Album of the Year.
  - Rigoberta Bandini wins Artist of the Year.
  - Tanxugueiras win Best New Artist.
- April 28 – The virtual version of Latin Alternative Music Conference takes place.
- May 14 – Spain's Chanel ends third at the 66th edition of the Eurovision Song Contest with "SloMo", becoming the country's best placing since 1995.
- May 15 – Un Verano Sin Ti by Bad Bunny debuts atop the Billboard 200, becoming the second Spanish-language studio album to do so since El Último Tour del Mundo (2020).

=== July–September ===
- July 6 – The Latin Alternative Music Conference takes place at the Stewart Hotel in New York City.
- July 29 – With 3.708 million streams, "Despechá" by Rosalía earns the biggest streaming debut for a solo Spanish-language song by a female artist in Spotify history. It also broke the all-time single day stream record for a song by a female artist on Spotify Spain.
- August 23 – The 24th Premios Gardel take place at Movistar Arena in Buenos Aires to celebrate the best in Argentinian music.
  - Oscuro Éxtasis by Wos wins Album of the Year
  - "Miénteme" by Tini and María Becerra wins Song of the Year
  - "Mafiosa" by Nathy Peluso wins Record of the Year
  - Tiago PZK wins Best New Artist
- August 28 – "Envolver" by Anitta wins Best Latin at the MTV Video Music Awards, becoming the first ever Brazilian act to win a VMA. Other winners include Bad Bunny and Rosalía.
- September 25 – Grupo Firme performs a free concert at the Zócalo in Mexico City to a crowd of 280,000, the largest concert in the country's history.
- September 26 – The 2022 Billboard Latin Music Week starts its six-day run at Faena Forum in Miami Beach.
- September 30 – Reggaeton duo Wisin & Yandel release their final album, La Última Misión.

=== October–December ===
- November 4 – The 17th edition of LOS40 Music Awards take place at the WiZink Center, in Madrid.
  - Dani Fernández wins Best Spanish Act.
  - Motomami by Rosalía wins Best Spanish Album.
  - "Música ligera" by Ana Mena wins Best Spanish Song.
  - "360" by Marc Seguí wins Best Spanish Video.
- November 13 – The 29th MTV Europe Music Awards air on MTV live from Düsseldorf.
  - Anitta wins Best Latin.
  - Manu Gavassi wins Best Brazilian Act.
  - Kenia Os wins Best Latin America North Act.
  - Danny Ocean wins Best Latin America Central Act.
  - Tini wins Best Latin America South Act.
  - Bárbara Bandeira wins Best Portuguese Act.
  - Bad Gyal wins Best Spanish Act.
- November 15 – Following the announcement of the nominees for the 65th Annual Grammy Awards in 2023, Un Verano Sin Ti by Bad Bunny is first the Spanish-language album to ever be nominated Album of the Year
- November 17 – The 23rd Annual Latin Grammy Awards are held at the Michelob Ultra Arena in Las Vegas, Nevada. Uruguayan singer-songwriter Jorge Drexler is the most awarded artists with six wins:
  - "Tocarte" by Jorge Drexler and C. Tangana wins the Latin Grammy Awards for Song of the Year and Record of the Year.
  - Motomami by Spanish singer Rosalía wins the Latin Grammy Award for Album of the Year, making her the first female artist to achieve this accolade more than once.
  - For the first time in Latin Grammy history, the Best New Artist accolade is presented to more than one artists in a tie, with Angela Alvarez and Silvana Estrada, the former a 95 year-old woman making the oldest person to receive the accolade.
- December 1 – Un Verano Sin Ti tops the Billboard 200 year-end charts, making it the first Spanish-language album to do so. It also spent 13 weeks at number one on the chart.
- December 23 – Joan Manuel Serrat makes his final concert before retiring at age 79. It was held at Palau Sant Jordi, in Barcelona.
- December 31 – Wisin & Yandel end their farewell tour La Última Misión World Tour at Coliseo de Puerto Rico.

== Number-one albums and singles by country ==
- List of Billboard Argentina Hot 100 number-one singles of 2022
- List of number-one albums of 2022 (Portugal)
- List of number-one albums of 2022 (Spain)
- List of number-one singles of 2022 (Spain)
- List of number-one Billboard Latin Albums from the 2020s
- List of Billboard Hot Latin Songs and Latin Airplay number ones of 2022

== Awards ==
=== Latin music awards ===
- 34th Lo Nuestro Awards
- 2022 Billboard Latin Music Awards
- 2022 Latin American Music Awards
- 2022 Latin Grammy Awards
- 2022 Heat Latin Music Awards
- 2022 MTV Millennial Awards
- 2022 Tejano Music Awards

=== Awards with Latin categories ===
- 29th Billboard Music Awards
- 64th Annual Grammy Awards
- 9th iHeartRadio Music Awards
- 17th Los40 Music Awards
- 39th MTV Video Music Awards
- 24th Teen Choice Awards
- 3rd Annual Premios Odeón

== Spanish- and Portuguese-language songs on the Billboard Global 200 ==
The Billboard Global 200 is a weekly record chart published by Billboard magazine that ranks the top songs globally based on digital sales and online streaming from over 200 territories worldwide.

An asterisk (*) represents that a single is charting for the current week.

Song	Performer(s)	Entry	Peak	Weeks	Ref.
2020 entries
"Despacito"	Luis Fonsi & Daddy Yankee feat. Justin Bieber	September 19, 2020	114	91	
"Dakiti"	Bad Bunny & Jhay Cortez	November 14, 2020	1	111	
"Feliz Navidad"	José Feliciano	November 28, 2020	5	38	
2021 entries
"AM"	Nio García, J Balvin & Bad Bunny	April 24, 2021	10	47	
"Todo de Ti"	Rauw Alejandro	June 5, 2021	3	50	
"Qué Más Pues?"	J Balvin & María Becerra	June 12, 2021	17	31	
"Yonaguni"	Bad Bunny	June 19, 2021	3	73	
"Sobrio"	Maluma	July 24, 2021	52	30	
"Volando"	Mora, Bad Bunny & Sech	July 24, 2021	27	31	
"Pepas"	Farruko	July 31, 2021	7	87	
"Entre Nosotros"	Tiago PZK, Lit Killah, Nicki Nicole & María Becerra	July 31, 2021	41	26	
"Volví"	Aventura & Bad Bunny	August 14, 2021	11	37	
"Arranhão"	Henrique & Juliano	September 18, 2021	129	9	
"Nostálgico"	Rvssian, Rauw Alejandro & Chris Brown	September 25, 2021	81	22	
"Lo Siento BB"	Tainy, Bad Bunny & Julieta Venegas	October 16, 2021	12	44	
"Esqueça-me se for Capaz"	Marília Mendonça & Maiara & Maraisa	November 20, 2021	97	8	
"Mon Amour"	Zzoilo	November 20, 2021	73	23	
"La Fama"	Rosalía feat. The Weeknd	November 27, 2021	34	16	
"Ameaça"	Paulo Pires, MC Danny e Marcynho Sensação	November 27, 2021	110	5	
"Presepada"	Marília Mendonça & Maiara & Maraisa	December 4, 2021	170	3	
"Medallo"	Blessd, Justin Quiles & Lenny Tavárez	December 11, 2021	80	23	
"Tacones Rojos"	Sebastián Yatra	December 18, 2021	72	24	
2022 entries
"Desesperados"	Rauw Alejandro & Chencho Corleone	January 1, 2022	13	44	
"Vai La Em Casa Hoje"	George Henrique & Rodrigo feat. Marília Mendonça	January 1, 2022	105	7	
"Toma Toma Vapo Vapo"	Zé Felipe & MC Danny	January 8, 2022	99	2	
"Malvadão 3"	Xamã, Gustah & Neo Beats	January 8, 2022	47	14	
"Parada Louca"	Mari Fernández & Marcynho Sensação	January 8, 2022	157	2	
"Bzrp Music Sessions, Vol. 48"	Bizarrap & Tiago PZK	January 15, 2022	58	6	
"Dos Oruguitas"	Sebastián Yatra	January 15, 2022	26	16	
"Hasta la Raíz"	Natalia Lafourcade	January 15, 2022	188	1	
"Si te Pudiera Mentir"	Calibre 50	January 15, 2022	200	1	
"Bloqueado"	Gusttavo Lima	January 29, 2022	144	4	
"Mal Feito"	Hugo & Guilherme e Marília Mendonça	January 29, 2022	104	7	
"Colombia, Mi Encanto"	Carlos Vives	February 5, 2022	166	3	
"Pandora"	DJ Matt-D, Vulgo FK, Menor MC & MC GP	February 5, 2022	191	1	
"La Canción"	J Balvin & Bad Bunny	February 12, 2022	15	49	
"Mujeriego"	Ryan Castro	February 12, 2022	125	11	
"Ella"	Boza, Lunay, Lenny Tavárez, Juhn & Beéle	February 12, 2022	200	1	
"La Santa"	Bad Bunny & Daddy Yankee	February 19, 2022	151	10	
"Malvada"	Zé Felipe	February 19, 2022	82	7	
"Saoko"	Rosalía	February 19, 2022	101	3	
"Mamiii"	Becky G & Karol G	February 26, 2022	4	38	
"A Tu Merced"	Bad Bunny	March 5, 2022	152	5	
"Cayó La Noche"	Quevedo, El Ima, Cruz Cafuné, Bejo, La Pantera, Juseph & Abhir Hathi	March 5, 2022	145	8	
"Ya No Somos Ni Seremos"	Christian Nodal	March 5, 2022	36	9	
"Dançarina"	Pedro Sampaio & MC Pedrinho	March 5, 2022	84	7	
"Botadinha Saliente"	MC Rogerinho	March 12, 2022	141	1	
"Depende"	DJ Guuga	March 12, 2022	162	1	
"Yo Voy"	Zion & Lennox feat. Daddy Yankee	March 12, 2022	119	10	
"Bzrp Music Sessions, Vol. 49"	Bizarrap & Residente	March 19, 2022	20	2	
"Chale"	Edén Muñoz	March 19, 2022	67	9	
"Envolver"	Anitta	March 19, 2022	2	29	
"Una Noche en Medellín"	Cris Mj	March 19, 2022	29	28	
"Jordan"	Ryan Castro	March 19, 2022	65	15	
"Chicken Teriyaki"	Rosalía	April 2, 2022	72	1	
"Candy"	Rosalía	April 2, 2022	75	2	
"Plan A"	Paulo Londra	April 2, 2022	8	7	
"Sentadona (Aí Calica)"	MC Frog, Davi Kneip e DJ Gabriel do Borel	April 2, 2022	54	7	
"Pantysito"	Alejo, Feid & ROBI	April 2, 2022	122	7	
"Fuera del Mercado"	Danny Ocean	April 9, 2022	36	14	
"Soy el Único"	Yahritza y Su Esencia	April 9, 2022	29	5	
"X Última Vez"	Daddy Yankee & Bad Bunny	April 9, 2022	23	11	
"Sigue"	J Balvin & Ed Sheeran	April 9, 2022	52	3	
"Rumbatón"	Daddy Yankee	April 9, 2022	82	2	
"Remix"	Daddy Yankee	April 9, 2022	147	1	
"Me Arrepentí"	Ak4:20, Pailita & Cris Mj	April 16, 2022	138	1	
"Demasiadas Mujeres"	C. Tangana	April 16, 2022	174	4	
"Chance"	Paulo Londra	April 23, 2022	93	1	
"Vampiro"	Matuê, WIU & Teto	April 23, 2022	151	1	
"No Ouvidinho"	Felipe Amorim	April 30, 2022	172	1	
"Provenza"	Karol G	May 7, 2022	6	62	
"Bzrp Music Sessions, Vol. 23"	Bizarrap & Paulo Londra	May 7, 2022	21	3	
"Te Felicito"	Shakira & Rauw Alejandro	May 7, 2022	11	36	
"Si Quieren Frontear"	Quevedo, Duki & De La Ghetto	May 7, 2022	200	1	
"Ultra Solo"	Polimá Westcoast feat. Pailita	May 14, 2022	24	26	
"Tus Lágrimas"	Mora & Sech	May 14, 2022	162	2	
"Moscow Mule"	Bad Bunny	May 21, 2022	2	52	
"Me Porto Bonito"	Bad Bunny & Chencho Corleone	May 21, 2022	2	79	
"Tití Me Preguntó"	Bad Bunny	May 21, 2022	4	98	
"Ojitos Lindos"	Bad Bunny & Bomba Estéreo	May 21, 2022	4	72	
"Después de la Playa"	Bad Bunny	May 21, 2022	7	23	
"Party"	Bad Bunny & Rauw Alejandro	May 21, 2022	8	30	
"Tarot"	Bad Bunny & Jhay Cortez	May 21, 2022	9	30	
"Un Ratito"	Bad Bunny	May 21, 2022	11	22	
"Yo No Soy Celoso"	Bad Bunny	May 21, 2022	14	17	
"Neverita"	Bad Bunny	May 21, 2022	16	42	
"La Corriente"	Bad Bunny & Tony Dize	May 21, 2022	17	26	
"Me Fui de Vacaciones"	Bad Bunny	May 21, 2022	18	14	
"Efecto"	Bad Bunny	May 21, 2022	7	53	
"Dos Mil 16"	Bad Bunny	May 21, 2022	20	21	
"Un Verano Sin Ti"	Bad Bunny	May 21, 2022	23	7	
"Andrea"	Bad Bunny & Buscabulla	May 21, 2022	24	19	
"Aguacero"	Bad Bunny	May 21, 2022	27	13	
"Otro Atardecer"	Bad Bunny & The Marías	May 21, 2022	28	16	
"Un Coco"	Bad Bunny	May 21, 2022	29	22	
"Enséñame a Bailar"	Bad Bunny	May 21, 2022	30	7	
"El Apagón"	Bad Bunny	May 21, 2022	35	6	
"Callaíta"	Bad Bunny & Tainy	May 21, 2022	41	19	
"Agosto"	Bad Bunny	May 21, 2022	43	5	
"SloMo"	Chanel	May 28, 2022	151	1	
"La Llevo al Cielo"	Chris Jedi, Chencho Corleone, Anuel AA & Ñengo Flow	June 4, 2022	100	18	
"Acorda Pedrinho"	Jovem Dionisio	June 4, 2022	100	2	
"En el Radio un Cochinero"	Víctor Cibrián	June 11, 2022	171	2	
"Bzrp Music Sessions, Vol. 51"	Bizarrap & Villano Antillano	June 25, 2022	65	12	
"Bandido"	Zé Felipe & MC Mari	July 9, 2022	152	2	
"Ojos Marrones"	Lasso	July 16, 2022	66	20	
"Bzrp Music Sessions, Vol. 52"	Bizarrap & Quevedo	July 23, 2022	1	60	
"Normal"	Feid	July 23, 2022	75	31	
"La Bachata"	Manuel Turizo	July 23, 2022	6	112	
"Ai Preto"	DJ Biel do Furduncinho, L7nnon & Bianca	July 23, 2022	186	3	
"La Loto"	Tini, Becky G & Anitta	July 23, 2022	197	1	
"Pipoco"	Ana Castela, Melody & DJ Chris No Beat	July 30, 2022	113	4	
"Givenchy"	Duki	August 6, 2022	40	4	
"Cachorrinhas"	Luísa Sonza	August 6, 2022	141	1	
"El Rescate"	Grupo Marca Registrada & Junior H	August 6, 2022	153	7	
"Despechá"	Rosalía	August 13, 2022	6	42	
"Cómo Dormiste?"	Rels B	August 20, 2022	51	9	
"Si Te La Encuentras Por Ahí"	Feid	August 20, 2022	129	2	
"Caile"	Luar La L	August 27, 2022	67	10	
"Lokera"	Rauw Alejandro, Lyanno & Brray	August 27, 2022	55	30	
"Siempre Pendientes"	Peso Pluma & Luis R. Conriquez	September 3, 2022	174	3	
"Gatúbela"	Karol G & Maldy	September 10, 2022	23	21	
"La Inocente"	Mora & Feid	September 10, 2022	169	4	
"El Pañuelo"	Romeo Santos & Rosalía	September 17, 2022	134	1	
"Mercedes Tintea"	Anuel AA	September 17, 2022	177	1	
"Feliz Cumpleaños Ferxxo"	Feid	September 17, 2022	61	42	
"Vista Al Mar"	Quevedo	October 1, 2022	114	16	
"Prohibidox"	Feid	October 1, 2022	172	1	
"Party En El Barrio"	Paulo Londra feat. Duki	October 1, 2022	186	1	
"No Se Va"	Grupo Frontera	October 8, 2022	31	35	
"Baby Otaku"	Pablo Pesadilla, Polimá Westcoast & Nicko OG	October 8, 2022	102	5	
"Besos Moja2"	Wisin & Yandel & Rosalía	October 15, 2022	102	16	
"Punto 40"	Rauw Alejandro & Baby Rasta	October 22, 2022	72	17	
"Hey Mor"	Ozuna feat. Feid	October 29, 2022	27	42	
"Monotonía"	Shakira & Ozuna	November 5, 2022	18	19	
"Eu Gosto Assim"	Gustavo Mioto & Mari Fernández	November 5, 2022	155	5	
"APA"	Mora & Quevedo	November 19, 2022	198	1	
"Con La Brisa"	Foudeqush & Ludwig Göransson	November 26, 2022	103	3	
"Bzrp Music Sessions, Vol. 50"	Bizarrap & Duki	November 26, 2022	33	3	
"Cairo"	Karol G & Ovy On The Drums	December 3, 2022	51	19	
"Tukoh Taka"	Nicki Minaj, Maluma & Myriam Fares	December 3, 2022	106	1	
"Evoque Prata"	MC Menor HR, MC Menor SG & DJ Escobar	December 3, 2022	147	3	
"Qué Agonía"	Yuridia & Ángela Aguilar	December 10, 2022	95	16	
"La Jumpa"	Arcángel & Bad Bunny	December 17, 2022	14	28	
"Gatita"	Bellakath	December 24, 2022	113	6	
"Marisola"	Cris Mj & Standly	December 31, 2022	70	14	

== Spanish-language songs on the Billboard Hot 100 ==
The Billboard Hot 100 ranks the most-played songs in the United States based on sales (physical and digital), radio play, and online streaming. Also included are certifications awarded by the Recording Industry Association of America (RIAA) based on digital downloads and on-demand audio and/or video song streams: gold certification is awarded for sales of 500,000 copies, platinum for one million units, and multi-platinum for two million units, and following in increments of one million thereafter. The RIAA also awards Spanish-language songs under the Latin certification: Disco de Oro (Gold) is awarded for sales 30,000 certification copies, Disco de Platino (Platinum) for 60,000 units, and Disco de Multi-Platino (Multi-Platinum) for 120,000 units, and following in increments of 60,000 thereafter.

Song	Performer(s)	Entry	Peak	Weeks	RIAA certification	Ref.
2017 entries
"Feliz Navidad"	José Feliciano	January 7, 2017	6	43		
2021 entries
"Pepas"	Farruko	August 7, 2021	25	21	52× Platinum (Latin)	
"Volví"	Aventura & Bad Bunny	August 14, 2021	22	18		
2022 entries
"Dos Oruguitas"	Sebastián Yatra	January 15, 2022	36	16	Platinum	
"Colombia, Mi Encanto"	Carlos Vives	February 12, 2022	100	1	Gold	
"Mamiii"	Becky G & Karol G	February 26, 2022	15	20	23× Platinum (Latin)	
"Envolver"	Anitta	April 9, 2022	70	6	17× Platinum (Latin)	
"Soy el Único"	Yahritza y Su Esencia	April 9, 2022	20	5	10× Platinum (Latin)	
"X Última Vez"	Daddy Yankee & Bad Bunny	April 9, 2022	73	3	3× Platinum (Latin)	
"Sigue"	J Balvin & Ed Sheeran	April 9, 2022	89	1		
"Desesperados"	Rauw Alejandro & Chencho Corleone	April 16, 2022	91	8	4× Platinum (Latin)	
"Provenza"	Karol G	May 7, 2022	25	21	36× Platinum (Latin)	
"Moscow Mule"	Bad Bunny	May 21, 2022	4	23		
"Tití Me Preguntó"	Bad Bunny	May 21, 2022	5	33		
"Después de la Playa"	Bad Bunny	May 21, 2022	6	20		
"Me Porto Bonito"	Bad Bunny & Chencho Corleone	May 21, 2022	6	26		
"Party"	Bad Bunny & Rauw Alejandro	May 21, 2022	14	20		
"Un Ratito"	Bad Bunny	May 21, 2022	16	16		
"Tarot"	Bad Bunny & Jhay Cortez	May 21, 2022	18	20		
"Yo No Soy Celoso"	Bad Bunny	May 21, 2022	22	6		
"Ojitos Lindos"	Bad Bunny & Bomba Estéreo	May 21, 2022	26	20		
"Neverita"	Bad Bunny	May 21, 2022	31	14		
"La Corriente"	Bad Bunny & Tony Dize	May 21, 2022	32	14		
"Efecto"	Bad Bunny	May 21, 2022	34	22		
"Aguacero"	Bad Bunny	May 21, 2022	44	3		
"Dos Mil 16"	Bad Bunny	May 21, 2022	45	3		
"Otro Atardecer"	Bad Bunny & The Marías	May 21, 2022	49	3		
"Andrea"	Bad Bunny & Buscabulla	May 21, 2022	51	4		
"El Apagón"	Bad Bunny	May 21, 2022	54	2		
"Un Verano Sin Ti"	Bad Bunny	May 21, 2022	55	1		
"Un Coco"	Bad Bunny	May 21, 2022	56	3		
"Me Fui de Vacaciones"	Bad Bunny	May 21, 2022	59	2		
"Enséñame a Bailar"	Bad Bunny	May 21, 2022	60	2		
"Agosto"	Bad Bunny	May 21, 2022	74	1		
"Te Felicito"	Shakira & Rauw Alejandro	June 18, 2022	67	8	24× Platinum (Latin)	
"Bzrp Music Sessions, Vol. 52"	Bizarrap & Quevedo	August 6, 2022	79	10	15× Platinum (Latin)	
"Despechá"	Rosalía	August 20, 2022	63	12	Platinum	
"La Bachata"	Manuel Turizo	September 3, 2022	67	21	22× Platinum (Latin)	
"Gatúbela"	Karol G & Maldy	September 10, 2022	37	11	13× Platinum (Latin)	
"Sin Fin"	Romeo Santos & Justin Timberlake	September 17, 2022	100	1	3× Platinum (Latin)	
"No Se Va"	Grupo Frontera	October 8, 2022	57	20		
"Lokera"	Rauw Alejandro, Lyanno & Brray	October 22, 2022	99	1	22× Platinum (Latin)	
"Monotonía"	Shakira & Ozuna	November 5, 2022	65	3	16× Platinum (Latin)	
"La Jumpa"	Arcángel & Bad Bunny	December 17, 2022	68	10		

== Albums released ==
The following is a list of notable Latin albums (music performed in Spanish or Portuguese) (Note: In the United States, Billboard and the RIAA recognizes an album as "Latin" if 51% or more of its content is sung in the Spanish language. The Latin Recording Academy extends this definition of "Latin music" to include Portuguese-language records as well as other languages and dialects of Ibero-America such as Catalan, Nahuatl, Quechua, Galician, Valencia, and Mayan. The Latin Recording Academy also includes Latin instrumental recordings performed by Ibero-American musicians. Note that Spain and Portugal are included under this definition of Ibero-America.) that have been released in Latin America, Spain, Portugal, or the United States in 2022.

=== First quarter ===
==== January ====
Day	Title	Artist	Genre(s)	Singles	Label
12	De Mi Para Ti	Jay Wheeler	Reggaeton		Linked
14	Mundos Inmóbiles Derrumbándose	Nacho Vegas	Singer-Songwriter		Oso Polita
14	Desengaiola	Alfredo Del-Penho, João Cavalcanti, Moyseis Marques e Pedro Miranda	Samba		Som Livre
18	Mojigata	Marilina Bertoldi	Rock en español		Pelo Music
21	Era	León Benavente	Latin pop		Warner Spain
21	La Fuerza	Christina Aguilera	Latin pop	"Pa Mis Muchachas"; "Somos Nada"; "Santo"	Sony Music Latin
21	Las Canciones del Agua	Los Planetas	Alternative rock		Ejército Rojo
21	Marchita	Silvana Estrada	Singer-Songwriter	"Marchita"; "Tristeza"; "Te Guardo"; "La Corriente"	Aitafonte
25	Imersão 5	Diante do Trono	Latin Christian music		OniMusic
26	QVVJFA?	Baco Exu Do Blues	Brazilian rock		999
26	Numanice 2	Ludmilla	Samba	"Maldivas"	999
28	Cuatro Chavales	Carolina Durante	Rock en Español		Universal Spain
28	Dharma	Sebastián Yatra	Latin pop; Reggaeton	"Runaway"; "TBT"; "A Dónde Van"; "Chica Ideal"; "Adiós"; "Pareja del Año"; "Tarde"; "Tacones Rojos"; "Amor Pasajero"; "Regresé"; "Melancólicos Anónimos"; "Dharma"; "Quererte Bonito"; "Si Me La Haces"; "Las Dudas"; "Básicamente"	Universal Latin
28	Superpop	Belén Aguilera	Latin pop		Universal Spain
28	Me Siento a Todo Dar	Banda Los Recoditos	Regional Mexican		Universal Spain

==== February ====
Day	Title	Artist	Genre(s)	Singles	Label
2	Chama Meu Nome	Pedro Sampaio	Pop, Brazilian Funk	"Galopa" "No Chão Novinha" "Bagunça"	Warner Brazil
2	Pra Gente Acordar	Gilsons	Pop		Xirê Produções e Eventos
4	Conmigo	María Parrado	Pop		CME
4	El Año del Tigre	Miss Caffeina	Pop		Warner Spain
4	Kor Kor Lake	Rojuu	Experimental pop		Sonido Muchacho
4	Suposo Que l'Amor És Això	Ginestà	Indie pop		Kasba
4	O Futuro Pertence à... Jovem Guarda	Erasmo Carlos	Brazilian rock		Som Livre
10	Lady Leste	Gloria Groove	Pop, R&B, Rap, Brazilian Funk	"Bonekinha" "A Queda" "Leilão" "Vermelho"	SB Music
10	Y Te Lo Dice...	Puerto Rican Power	Salsa		Musical Productions
11	Inmortales	Funzo & Baby Loud	Latin pop		Sony Spain
11	Mal De Amores	Sofía Reyes	Latin pop		Warner Latina
11	Mi Vida En Un Cigarro 2	Junior H	Regional Mexican		Warner Music Latina
11	El Amor y Yo	Jay Wheeler	Urbano		Linked Music
11	Chitãozinho & Xororó Legado	Chitãozinho & Xororó	Sertanejo		Onerpm
16	Chabem	Chano Domínguez, Rubem Dantas & Hamilton de Holanda	Latin jazz		Altafonte
18	El Madileño: La Sobremesa	C. Tangana	Folk	"Yate"; "Ateo"; "La Culpa"	Sony Spain
18	Entre Las Dudas y El Azar	Dani Fernández	Latin pop		Warner Spain
18	Agendas Vencidas	El David Aguilar	Singer-Songwriter		Universal Music México
25	Diamants	Els Catarres	Pop-folk		Halley Records
25	Ilusionismo	Despistaos	Rock		Warner Spain
25	Juglar del Siglo XXI	Ayax y Prok	Rap		ALBZ
25	La Lucha Por la Vida	Ilegales	Merengue		Warner Spain
25	Manhattan	Café Quijano	Pop rock		Warner Spain
25	Trap Cake, Vol. 2	Rauw Alejandro	Latin trap	"Caprichoso"; "Gracias por Nada"; "Wuepa"; "Museo"	Sony Music Latin
25	XXX	Albany	Trap		Ladradora
25	O Samba e o Amor	Antonio Cirilo	Latin Christian		Sonora Digital

==== March ====
Day	Title	Artist	Genre(s)	Singles	Label
4	Pa'llá Voy	Marc Anthony	Salsa	"Pa'llá Voy"; "Mala"; "Nada de Nada"	Sony Music Latin
4	Bubblegum	Jory Boy	Reggaeton		BMG Rights Management
8	¿Quién Dijo Miedo?	Gilberto Daza	Latin Christian		Creation Music Group
8	Senhora das Folhas	Áurea Martins	Folk		Sarapuí Produções
10	Mistura Homogênea	Martinho Da Vila	Samba		Sony Music Brasil
10	Natural	Lauana Prado	Sertanejo music		Universal Music
11	Ascensão	Black Pantera	Thrash metal, hardcore punk	"Padrão É o Caralho"; "Fogo nos Racistas"	Deckdisc
11	Ley se Gravedad	Luis Fonsi	Latin pop	"Date la Vuelta"; "Perfecta"; "Bésame"	Universal Latin
11	Corridos Felones: Serie 35	Los Tucanes de Tijuana	Norteño		Master Q Music
11	En Lo Que Llega La Primavera	Alex Ferreira	Pop rock		Mediaisla
18	Motomami	Rosalía	Experimental pop, Alternative reggaeton	"La Fama"; "Saoko"; "Chicken Teriyaki"	Columbia
18	Crisálida	Danilo Pérez featuring The Global Messengers	Latin jazz		Mack Avenue Records
25	Calle Liberación	Sexy Zebras	Rock	"Nena"	Independent
25	Legendaddy	Daddy Yankee	Reggaeton	"Rumbatón"; "Agua"; "Bombón"; "Hot"; "Remix"; "X Última Vez"; "Para Siempre"; "Pasatiempo"	El Cartel; Universal Music; Republic Records
25	Yo Soy Colombia	Zona 8 R & Rolando Ochoa	Cumbia/vallenato		Independiente

=== Second quarter ===
==== April ====
Day	Title	Artist	Genre(s)	Singles	Label
1	Retrats	Sexenni	Latin pop	"Tengo"; "La Cançó dels Strokes"; "De Lao"	Delirics
1	Microdosis	Mora	Reggaeton	"Tus Lágrimas"; "La Inocente"; "Memorias"	Rimas Entertainment
1	40 Aniversario Embajadores del Mariachi	Mariachi Sol de Mexico de José Hernández	Mariachi		Serenata
1	Spinettango	Spinettango	Tango		Nacional
4	Tarde de Juegos	Mi Casa Es Tu Casa	Children's music		Mi Casa Es Tu Casa
7	Sabiduria	El Alfa	Reggaeton		El Jefe Record
8	NataKong	Natanael Cano	Regional Mexican	"De a de Veras"; "Estrellas"	WEA Latina
8	De Menor a Mayor	Gente de Zona	Contemporary tropical	"Muchacha"; "Otra Botella"; "Háblame de Miami"; "Q'lona"; "El Negrito"	Sony Music Latin
8	Familia	Camila Cabello	Latin pop	"Don't Go Yet"; "Bam Bam"	Epic
12	Versions of Me	Anitta	Latin pop	"Me Gusta"; "Girl from Rio"; "Envolver"; "Boys Don't Cry"	Warner
13	Va De Nuevo	Banda Fortuna	Banda		Fonovisa
13	Sim Sim Sim	Bala Desejo	Pop		Coala
15	Milonguero	Pablo Motta Ensamble featuring Franco Luciani	Tango		MAMP Songs
15	Perreo King	Guelo Star	Reggaeton	"Se Te Ve (Remix)"	GLAD Empire
17	El Ruido del Agua	Eddie Mora	Classical		Independiente
20	Sembrando	Peso Pluma	Regional Mexican	"Spiral"; "Sembrando	Prajin Parlay; Worms Music
22	Respira	Akapellah	Urbano		Sony Music Latin
22	Dime Cómo Se Siente	Destiny Navaira	Tejano		UNIMUSIK
22	Tinta y Tiempo	Jorge Drexler	Singer-Songwriter		Sony Music España
22	Libres	Las Migas	Flamenco		Las Migas Music
22	Alegoría	Gaby Moreno	Latin alternative		Metamorfosis Enterprises
22	Las II Torres	Gigolo y La Exce	Reggaeton, Trap		Rimas Entertainment
27	Viajante	Fonseca	Latin pop	"Cartagena"; "2005"; "Háblame Bajito"; "Pasa"; "Besos en la Frente"; "Volvámonos a Enamorar"; "En Vivo y en Directo"	Sony Music Latin
27	Gran Combo Pa´ Rato	Septeto Nacional Ignacio Piñeiro	Traditional tropical		Bis Music
27	Brujos	Orquesta Sinfónica De Heredia	Classical		Independiente
28	Trinchera	Babasónicos	Pop rock	"La Izquierda de la Noche"; "Bye Bye"; "Trinchera"	Popart Discos
28	La Tierra Llora	Paulina Aguirre	Folk rock		Mucho Fruto Music
29	El Renacimiento	Carla Morrison	Latin pop	"Ansiedad"; "No Me Llames"; "Obra de Arte"; "Contigo"; "Diamantes"	Cosmica Artists
29	Lado A Lado B	Víctor Manuelle	Salsa		Sony Music Latin
29	All Inclusive	Marissa Mur	Contemporary tropical		Independiente
29	Bendiciones	Sandra Mihanovich	Folk		Sandra Mihanovich
29	If You Will	Flora Purim	Latin jazz		Strut Records

==== May ====
Day	Title	Artist	Genre(s)	Singles	Label
5	Sobre Vive	Criolo	Brazilian rock		Oloko
6	Cariño	Cariño	Bubblegum pop	"Si Me Quieres"; "No Me Convengo"	Sonido Muchacho
6	Un Verano Sin Ti	Bad Bunny	Reggaeton	"Callaíta"; "Moscow Mule"; "Tití Me Preguntó"; "Después de la Playa"; "Me Porto Bonito"; "Party"; "Neverita"; "El Apagón"; "Ojitos Lindos"	Rimas
6	Nostalgia	Eslabon Armado	Regional Mexican		DEL
6	Clichés	Jesse & Joy	Latin pop	"Llórale a Tu Madre"; "Respirar"; "Imagina"	Warner Music Latina
7	Bailaora (Mis Pies Son Mi Voz)	Siudy Garrido	Flamenco		Siudy Flamenco Dance
8	Frecuencia	Sin Bandera	Latin pop	"Ahora Sé"; "Dime Que Sí"; "Cuanto Te Vuelva a Ver"; "Nadie"	Sony Music México
13	Cuando No Sé Quién Soy	Amaia	Pop	"Yo Invito"; "Quiero Pero No"; "Yamaguchi"; "Bienvenidos al Show"	Universal Spain
13	Esquemas	Becky G	Reggaeton	"Ram Pam Pam"; "Fulanito"; "Mamiii"; "No Mienten"	RCA
13	CHABUCO DESDE EL TEATRO COLÓN DE BOGOTÁ	Chabuco	Traditional tropical		Marmaz
13	Cumbiana II	Carlos Vives	Contemporary tropical		Sony Music Latin
13	Reina Abeja	Chiquis Rivera	Banda		Fonovisa
19	Luis Figueroa	Luis Figueroa	Salsa		Sony Music Latin
19	Clásicos de Mi Cumbia	Checo Acosta	Cumbia		Checumbia
20	Clean	Luna Ki	Electropop	"Buenos Días", "Piketaison"	Universal Spain
20	Starina	Rojuu	Experimental pop		Sonido Muchacho
20	Filarmónico 20 Años	Marta Gómez	Latin pop		Aluna Music
20	Este Soy Yo	Héctor Acosta "El Torito"	Bachata		Independent
20	Live in Marciac	Aymée Nuviola and Gonzalo Rubalcaba	Traditional Tropical		5 Passion Records
20	Canten	Leoni Torres	Traditional Tropical		Puntilla Music
20	El Mundo Está Loco	Jorge Luis Chacín	Contemporary Tropical		Dnr Music
20	Back To 4	C4 Trío	Tropical music		GroundUP Music
20	Ella	Daniela Padrón and Glenda del E	Instrumental music		Oleta Music
20	¿Cómo Me Ves?	Jesús Adrián Romero	Latin Christian music		Vástago Producciones
20	Marakei	Claraluna	Children's music		Claraluna Taller Artístico
20	Oríki	Iara Rennó	Folk		Dobra Discos
20	Danilo & Chapis, Vol. 2	Danilo & Chapis	Children's music		Moon Moosic
20	Pasieros	Rubén Blades and Boca Livre	Latin jazz		Ruben Blades Productions
20	Imágenes Latinas	Spanish Harlem Orchestra	Salsa		Spanish Harlem Orchestra
24	Tango	Ricardo Montaner	Tango		Hecho A Mano Music
24	Legado	Berta Rojas	Classical		Onmusic Recordings
25	Camino al Progreso	Grupo Álamo	Tejano music		Ro'
25	Ya Llegó la Primavera	Aroddy	Latin Christian music		Expo Compositores Music
26	1021	La Gusana Ciega	Rock en español		Naranjada
26	Monstruos	Bruses	Pop rock		Worldwide
26	El De Siempre	Felipe Peláez	Vallenato		Arte Producciones
26	Café con Cariño	Renesito Avich	Traditional tropical		My Cuban Music
27	Forajido	Christian Nodal	Mariachi	"La Sinvergüenza"; "Ya No Somos Ni Seremos"; "Vivo en el 6"	Sony Music Latin
27	Feliz Aniversario	Jean Carlos Centeno and Ronal Urbina	Vallenato		Onerpm
27	Resistirá	Milly Quezada	Merengue		La Oreja Media Group
27	Tropico	Pavel Núñez	Contemporary tropical		La Oreja Media Group
27	Despreciado	El Plan	Tejano		Segura Music
27	Para Que Baile Mi Pueblo	Bobby Pulido	Tejano		Bobby Pulido Inc
27	Bienvenida La Vida	Grupo Bronco	Norteño		Quetono Music
27	La Reunión (Deluxe)	Los Tigres del Norte	Norteño		Fonovisa
27	Ancestros Sinfónico	Eme Alfonso, Síntesis, and X Alfonso	Folk		Facmusic Y El Cerrito
27	#CubanAmerican	Martin Bejerano	Latin jazz		Figgland
27	A La Fiesta De La Música Vamos Todos	Sophia	Children's music		NB Music
27	Dentro da Matrix	Erico Moreira	MPB		Érico Moreira
27	Hermes Croatto	Hermes Croatto	Folk		Sonar
28	ya no somos los mismos	Elsa y Elmar	Latin pop	"Ya No Somos los Mismos"; "Hasta Dónde Se Enamora"; "Corazones Negros"; "Cómo Acaba"; "Último y Primero"; "Atravesao"	Sony Music México
30	Una Ilusión	Isabel Marie	Tejano		Penfo Music
30	Nena Trampa	Cazzu	Latin trap	"Jefa"; "Maléfica"; "Nena Trampa"; "Piénsame"; "Isla Velde"	Rimas
30	La Tormenta	Christina Aguilera	Latin pop	"Suéltame"	Sony Music Latin
31	Aguilera	Christina Aguilera	Latin pop	"Pa Mis Muchachas"; "Somos Nada"; "Santo"; "Suéltame"; "No Es Que Te Extrañe"	Sony Music Latin
31	The Sacred Leaf	Afro-Andean Funk	Latin alternative		Just Play

==== June ====
Day	Title	Artist	Genre(s)	Singles	Label
2	Dañado	Ivan Cornejo	Regional Mexican		Manzana
2	Resenha Do Mumu	Mumuzinho	Regional Mexican		Manzana
3	Em Nome da Estrela	Xênia França	Pop		Independent
3	Raiz	Lauana Prado	Sertanejo		Universal Music
10	The Love & Sex Tape	Maluma	Urbano	"Cositas de USA"; "Mojando Asientos"; "Nos Comemos Vivos"; "Tsunami"	Sony Latin Music
10	Hodari	Hodari	Pop		We4 Music
10	Always Dream	Dimelo Flow	Reggaeton	"Suelta" "Se Le Ve" "MMC"	Rich Music
10	El Toque De Midas	J Alvarez	Reggaeton	"Quimica" "Hare Hare" "Se Suponia" "Matame" "Luz Prendia" "Nadie Lo Sabe"	On Top Of The World Music
10	ENR	Alex Rose	Reggaeton		WK Records
14	Mil Coisas Invisíveis	Tim Bernardes	MPB		Coala
15	¡Cantando Juntos!	Gaby Moreno & Zona Neon	Children's music		Millenium Me
24	Elba Ramalho no Maior São João do Mundo	Elba Ramalho	Brazilian roots		Deck

=== Third quarter ===
==== July ====
Day	Title	Artist	Genre(s)	Singles	Label
1	Camino al Sol	Vicente García	Folk		Sony Music Latin
13	Obsessed	Yahritza y Su Esencia	Sierreño	"Soy el Único"; "Esta Noche"	Lumbre Music
13	Play	Ricky Martin	Latin pop	"Otra Noche en L.A."; "A Veces Bien Y A Veces Mal"	Sony Latin Music
22	I Missed You Too!	Chucho Valdés and Paquito D'Rivera	Latin jazz		Paquito
28	É Simples Assim	Jorge & Mateus	Sertanejo		Som Livre
28	Estirpe	Pacho Flores	Classical		Universal Music Spain

==== August ====
Day	Title	Artist	Genre(s)	Singles	Label
1	Octet and Originals	Antonio Adolfo			AAM Music
5	Atipanakuy	Kayfex			Akashic Perú
9	Que Me Duela	Camilú	Latin pop		Linked Music
11	Mundo	Jay Wheeler	Reggaeton		
11	Meu Nome É Thiago André (Ao Vivo)	Thiaguinho	Samba		Paz & Bem
11	Serotonina	João Donato	MPB		Sete Mares
11	D	Djavan	MPB		Sete Mares
15	Cantata Negra	Marvin Camacho & UCR Coral	Classical		Marvin Camacho
19	Emociones	Santa Fe Klan	Regional Mexican		Cuatro Siete Tres Music
19	Bryan Behr Ao Vivo Em São Paulo	Bryan Behr	Pop		Universal Music
19	Desse Jeito	Maria Rita	Samba		Som Livre
22	Rhythm & Soul	Arturo Sandoval	Latin jazz		MetaJAX Entertainment
25	Don Juan	Maluma	Latin pop	"Sobrio"; "Mama Tetema"; "Junio"; "La Fórmula"; "La Reina"; "Diablo, Qué Chimba"; "Coco Loco"; "Parcera"; "Según Quién"; "Trofeo"	Sony Music Latin
26	La Sinfonía de los Bichos Raros	Puerto Candelaria	Children's music		Merlín
26	Música De Las Américas	Miguel Zenón	Latin jazz		Miel Music

==== September ====
Day	Title	Artist	Genre(s)	Singles	Label
1	Formula, Vol. 3	Romeo Santos	Bachata	"Sus Huellas"; "Sin Fin"; "El Pañuelo"; "Bebo"; "Me Extraño"; "SIRI"	Sony Music Latin
2	Olho Furta-Cor	Titãs	Brazilian rock		Midas Music
6	De Adentro Pa Afuera	Camilo	Latin pop	"Índigo"; "Alaska"; "NASA"; "Naturaleza"	Sony Music Latin
8	Debut y Segunda Tanda	Gilberto Santa Rosa	Salsa	"Cartas Sobre la Mesa"; "For Sale"	B2B Music
14	Feliz Cumpleaños Ferxxo Te Pirateamos el Álbum	Feid	Urbano	"Nieve"; "Castigo"; "Ferxxo 100"; "Normal"; "Si Te La Encuentras Por Ahí"; "Feliz Cumpleaños Ferxxo"; "Prohibidox"; "XQ Te Pones Así"	Universal Music Latino
16	Leandro Díaz	Silvestre Dangond	Vallenato		Sony Music Colombia
16	Prohibido el Toque	Juanfe Pérez	Flamenco		Youkali Music
16	Unánime	Roxana Amed	Latin jazz		Youkali Music
23	Reputa	Zahara	Alternative		Gozz
23	Made in Miami	Camilo Valencia and Richard Bravo	Instrumental		Pier 5
23	Habilidades Extraordinárias	Tulipa Ruiz	Brazilian rock		Brocal Edições Musicais
27	Meu Esquema	Rachel Reis	Brazilian rock		Altafonte
28	Huáscar Barradas Four Elements Immersive Symphony for Orchestra and Chorus	Simón Bolívar Symphony Orchestra	Classical		Hb
29	Fandango at the Wall in New York	Arturo O'Farrill & The Afro Latin Jazz Orchestra featuring The Congra Patria Son Jarocho Collective	Latin jazz		Tiger Turn
30	La Última Misión	Wisin & Yandel	Reggaeton	"Chica Bombastica"; "Ganas de Ti"; "Recordar"; "No Se Olvida"; "Llueve"; "Besos Moja2"; "Vapor"; "Miami"	Sony Music Latin
30	Road Trip	Manny Manuel	Merengue		La Oreja Media
30	Y Sigo Pa'lante	El Septeto Santiaguero	Traditional tropical		Egrem, El Cerrito
30	Herederos	Mariachi Herencia de Mexico	Mariachi		Mariachi Heritage Foundation
30	Depois Do Fim	Lagum			Sony Music Brasil

=== Fourth quarter ===
==== October ====
Day	Title	Artist	Genre(s)	Singles	Label
7	OzuTochi	Ozuna	Reggaeton	"Somos Iguales"; "La Copa"; "Te Pienso"; "Hey Mor"	Aura Music
7	Retrato del Aire	Pablo Jaurena	Tango		Acqua
12	Íntimo Extremo - 30 Años	A.N.I.M.A.L.	Rock		Sony Music Argentina
14	Intruso	Silvestre Dangond	Contemporary tropical		Sony Music Argentina
14	Prefiero Estar Contigo	La Arrolladora Banda El Limón de René Camacho	Banda		Disa
14	Aclarando la Mente	Joss Favela	Joss Favela		Sony Music Latin
14	Choro Negro	Cristovão Bastos and Mauro Senise	Instrumental		Biscoito Fino
14	Quietude	Eliane Elias	Jazz		Candid
14	Al Derecho Y Al Reverso	La Maquinaria Norteña	Regional Mexican		
21	Nacarile	iLe	Latin alternative		Sony Music Latin
21	Jardineiros	Planet Hemp	Latin alternative		Som Livre
22	Fuego & Poder (Live)	Barak	Latin Christian		Barak Music
27	Motherflower	Flor de Toloache	Regional Mexican		
28	De Todas las Flores	Natalia Lafourcade	Bolero, Bossa nova, Son jarocho	"De Todas las Flores"; "Mi Manera de Querer"	Sony Mexico
28	Do Amanhã Nada Sei	Almir Sater	Brazilian roots		Cantaville

==== November ====
Day	Title	Artist	Genre(s)	Singles	Label
3	Daramô	Tiago Iorc	MPB		Sony Music Brasil
4	Brooklyn Cumaná	Jorge Glem & Sam Reider	Instrumental		Guataca
4	Salitre	Seba Otero			
4	Salitre	Seba Otero T|			
11	Tu Historia	Julieta Venegas	Latin pop		Lolein Music
11	Saturno	Rauw Alejandro	Miami bass, reggaeton	"Lokera"; "Punto 40"; "Dime Quién????"; "Lejos del Cielo"; "De Carolina"; "Ron Cola"; "Panties y Brasieres"; "Que Rico Chingamos	Sony Music Latin
11	24/7	Gusi	Contemporary tropical		Gaira Música Local
11	Tierra de Promesas	Maréh	Singer-songwriter		Maréh
11	Se Canta con el Corazón	Majo Aguilar	Ranchera		Fonovisa, Universal Music Latino
11	De Hoy en Adelante, Que Te Vaya Bien	Julión Álvarez y Su Norteño Banda	Banda		Fonovisa
11	Barrio Canino (Pt. 2)	Alexis y Fido	Reggaeton	"Bumbunea"; "Igual O Peor"	Universal Music Latino
16	Quintal	Melim	Pop		Universal Music
16	Santuario	Javiielo	Reggaeton, Trap	"Mi Casi Algo"; "Espejismo"; "Bebi Demasiao"; "Yales & Gansters"	Oye Saavedra/EMPIRE
22	Corazón y Flecha	Manuel Carrasco	Pop		Universal Music Spain
23	Back to the Game	Paulo Londra	Pop rock, Reggaeton	"Plan A"; "Chance"; "Nublado"; "Luces"; "Cansado"; "Julieta"; "Noche de Novela"; "Party en el Barrio"; "A Veces"; "Necio"	Warner Music Latina
24	Placeres y pecados	Vanesa Martín	Pop		Warner Music Spain
24	Mesa Dulce	Dante Spinetta	Latin alternative		Sony Music Argentina
24	Quejíos de un Maleante	Omar Montes	Flamenco		Sony Music Latin
25	Punto y Aparte	Banda MS de Sergio Lizárragaa	Banda		Lizos Music
29	Ahora	Romo - Agri - Messiez Tango Trio	Tango		Aliud

==== December ====
Day	Title	Artist	Genre(s)	Singles	Label
1	Cumbia del Corazón	Los Ángeles Azules	Mexican cumbia		OCESA Seitrack
2	La Cuarta Hoja	Pablo Alborán	Latin pop	"Llueve Sobre Mojado"; "Soy Capaz"; "Castillos de Arena"; "Carretera y Manta"; "Viaje a Ningún Lado"; "Amigos"; "Ave de Paso"; "4U"	Warner Spain
2	La Neta	Pedro Capó	Latin pop		Sony Music Latin
6	Dopelganga	Eruca Sativa			Sony Music Argentina
8	Sambasá	Roberta Sá	Samba		Deck
8	La Nena de Argentina	María Becerra	Reggaeton, bachata, cumbia, dancehall pop, Latin pop, Latin trap	"Ojalá"; "Automático"; "La Nena de Argentina"; "Desafiando el Destino"; "Adiós"	300
9	Una Copa Por Cada Reina	Nathan Galante	Banda		Fonovisa, Del Rancho
15	El Favor de Dios	Ana del Castillo	Vallenato		Sony Music Argentina
15	TecnoShow	Gaby Amaranto	Brazilian folk		Deck
15	Flow La Movie Remixes	Various artists	Urbano		Flow la Movie
16	El Hombrecito del Mar	León Gieco	Pop rock		Sony Music Argentina
16	Epifanías	Susana Baca			Pregón
16	Drafted	Jovaan	Reggaeton, Trap	"Embustera"; "Robi Draqo"; "BBSIMONS"; "Bape (Remix)"	White Lion Records
20	Erva Doce	Gabriel Sater	Folk		Valete Records
21	Little Love	MC Cabelinho	Hip Hop; Rap		Brisa 13
30	Sin Fin	Gary Hobbs			M Music
30	Erva Doce	Gabriel Sater			Valetes
30	Pa Que Hablen	Fuerza Regida	Regional Mexican	"Ch y la Pizza"; "Igualito a Mi Apá"	Sony Music Latin
30	Sigan Hablando	Fuerza Regida	Regional Mexican	"Chrysler 300"; "Prefiero Empedarme"; "Bebe Dame"	Sony Music Latin

== Year-End ==
=== Performance in the United States ===
==== Albums ====
The following is a list of the 10 best-performing Latin albums in the United States according to Billboard and Nielsen SoundScan, which compiles data from traditional sales and album-equivalent units.

Rank	Album	Artist
1	Un Verano Sin Ti	Bad Bunny
2	YHLQMDLG	Bad Bunny
3	El Último Tour Del Mundo	Bad Bunny
4	Vice Versa	Rauw Alejandro
5	X 100pre	Bad Bunny
6	KG0516	Karol G
7	Ones	Selena
8	La 167	Farruko
9	Oasis	J Balvin and Bad Bunny
10	Jose	J Balvin

==== Songs ====
The following is a list of the 10 best-performing Latin songs in the United States according to Billboard and Nielsen SoundScan, which compiles data from streaming activity, digital sales and radio airplay.

Rank	Single	Artist
1	"Me Porto Bonito"	Bad Bunny and Chencho Corleone
2	"Telepatía"	Kali Uchis
3	"Tití Me Preguntó"	Bad Bunny
4	"Mamiii"	Becky G and Karol G
5	"Provenza"	Karol G
6	"Efecto"	Bad Bunny
7	"Party"	Bad Bunny and Rauw Alejandro
8	"Después de la Playa"	Bad Bunny
9	"Pepas"	Farruko
10	"Ojitos Lindos"	Bad Bunny and Bomba Estéreo

== Deaths ==
- January 2 – Ana Bejerano, Spanish singer (Mocedades), 60
- January 10 – Jordi Sabatés, 73, Spanish pianist.
- January 11 – Martín Carrizo, 50, drummer for A.N.I.M.A.L.
- January 18 – Tito Matos, 53, Puerto Rican requinto player, heart attack.
- January 24 – Osvaldo Peredo, 91, Argentine tango singer.
- January 26 – Ludmila Ferber, Brazilian Christian singer-songwriter and writer, 56
- January 20 – Elza Soares, Brazilian samba singer, 91
- January 26 – Ludmila Ferber, 56, Brazilian Christian singer-songwriter and writer.
- January 27 – Diego Verdaguer, Argentine singer-songwriter, 70
- February 3 – Renée Pietrafesa Bonnet, 83, Uruguayan composer and pianist.
- February 5 – Rubén Fuentes, Mexican violinist and composer, 95
- February 10 – Steve Salas, 69, American singer, bass player, percussionist
- February 16:
  - Juan Carlos Moguel, Mexican producer, composer and sound engineer
  - Chelique Sarabia, 81, Venezuelan musician and songwriter.
  - Ramón Stagnaro, 67, Peruvian guitarist.
- February 19 – Álvaro Manzano, 66, Ecuadorian conductor.
- February 23 – Carlos Barbosa-Lima, Brazilian classical and jazz guitarist, 77
- March 5 – Patricio Renán, Chilean New Wave and ballad singer, 77
- March 6 – Pau Riba i Romeva, Spanish and Mallorquín musician, 73
- March 11 – Guayo Cedeño, Honduran jazz and samba musician, 48 (respiratory failure)
- March 13 – Teresa Berganza, 89, Spanish mezzo-soprano.
- March 18 – Bernabé Martí, 93, Spanish tenor.
- March 20 – Ismael Rivera Jr., 67, Puerto Rican salsa singer, son of Ismael Rivera
- March 30 – Francisco González, 68, co-founder of Los Lobos
- April 18:
  - José Luis "El Tosco" Cortés, 70, Cuban musician and founder of NG La Banda
  - María Inés Naveillán, 68, Chilean singer
- May 2 – María José Cantilo, 68, Argentine singer-songwriter.
- May 27 – Juan José Mosalini, 78, Argentine bandoneon player.
- June 2:
  - Paulo Diniz, 82, Brazilian singer.
  - Gracia Montes, 86, Spanish copla singer.
- June 3 – Willie Sotelo, 61, Puerto Rican pianist, musical director
- July 17:
  - César Pedroso, 75, Cuban pianist (Los Van Van, Pupy y Los que Son, Son).
  - Héctor Tricoche, 66, Puerto Rican salsa singer-songwriter.
- July 22 – Henrique Morelenbaum, 90, Brazilian conductor
- July 26 – Darío Gómez, 71, Colombian singer.
- July 29 – Ulises Eyherabide, 55, Argentine Christian rock singer, co-founder of Rescate
- August 1 – Rosa de Castilla, 90, Mexican singer and actress (The Unknown Mariachi, Yo... el aventurero, Héroe a la fuerza).
- August 7 – Ernesto Cavour, 82, Bolivian singer (Los Jairas). 1
- August 24 – Tomás Muñoz, 88, Spanish record label executive
- August 27 – Manolo Sanlúcar, 78, Spanish flamenco composer and guitarist.
- September 5: Ralph Irizarry, 67, American percussionist and bandleader, multiple organ failure.
- September 8: Marciano Cantero, 62, Argentine singer (Enanitos Verdes).
- September 10 – Paulino Bernal, 83, American accordionist and Christian evangelist.
- September 12 – Aquiles Báez, 58, Venezuelan musician, arranger, and producer
- October 2 – Adrían "Bin" Valencia, 61, Argentine percussionist (Almafuerte)
- October 10 – Leon Schidlowsky, 91, Chilean-Israeli composer.
- November 22:
  - Erasmo Carlos, 81, Brazilian singer-songwriter ("Sentado à Beira do Caminho"), kidney disease.
  - Pablo Milanés, 79, Cuban singer-songwriter.
- December 6 – Edino Krieger, 94, Brazilian composer and conductor.
- December 7 – Carmen Jara, 85, Spanish copla singer and actress
- December 8 – Djalma Corrêa, 80, Brazilian percussionist and composer, pancreatic cancer.
- December 13 – Lalo Rodríguez, 64, Puerto Rican salsa singer ("Ven, Devórame Otra Vez").
- December 19 – Claudisabel, 46, Portuguese singer, traffic collision.
- December 28 – Linda de Suza, 74, Portuguese singer, COVID-19.
