= Nublado =

Single by Paulo Londra

from the album Back to the Game
- Language: Spanish
- English title: "Cloudy"
- Released: June 29, 2022
- Genre: Pop rock; Pop punk
- Length: 3:00
- Label: Warner
- Songwriters: Paulo Londra; Federico Vindver
- Producer: Federico Vindver

Paulo Londra singles chronology
"Paulo Londra: Bzrp Music Sessions, Vol. 23" (2022)	"Nublado" (2022)	"Luces" (2022)

Music video
- "Nublado" on YouTube

"Nublado" is a song by Argentine rapper and singer Paulo Londra. It was released on June 29, 2022, through Warner Music Latina, as the third single from his second studio album Back to the Game (2022). It was co-written and produced by Federico Vindver. On November 21, Londra released a remix of the song along with the American drummer Travis Barker from Blink-182.

== Background ==
On June 27, 2022, Londra, in collaboration with Spotify, announced through an Instagram post the release of his fourth song "Nublado", which would premiere on June 29. The next day, Paulo released a teaser of the music video, revealing that its theme would be set in a high school talent show. The teaser managed to surpass one million views in its first 24 hours, positioning itself at the top of trending for most viewed videos in different countries.

== Critical reception ==
"Nublado" received positive reviews. Ofer Laszewicki from Al Día wrote that Londra "aims to showcase his musical versatility, with a commitment to pop-rock of evident American influence", and highlighted that "his energetic voice stands out above the instrumental base, as well as the fact that the song recalls the sounds of Blink-182, Sum 41 or Green Day", just like the vocal lines and the concept of the video. Juan Manuel Vallecillo from the website Extra Jaén described the song as a "fresh, catchy and with formidable arrangements"; and also highlighted that "it's a song that gives strength and energy". The single was also regarded as a continuation of the musical direction set by "Plan A", which marked Londra's return to music.

== Commercial performance ==
The single debuted at number 23 on the Billboard Argentina Hot 100, marking the highest debut of a song for that week in the chart.

== Music video ==
The music video was directed by Agustín Portela and filmed in Buenos Aires, where Londra is seen dressed as a private school student attending a talent show. Various groups take the stage to showcase their abilities, and then it's his turn. Initially appearing nervous, he gains more confidence when his band joins him, and he starts singing with assurance, lifting the spirits of the audience and the judges. In its first 24 hours, the video managed to surpass the 2 million views mark on YouTube, leading it to trend on the platform.

The theme of the music video generated a strong impact on social media, particularly on Twitter, where users mentioned that the aesthetic resembled the movie High School Musical (2006), leading the music video to become the subject of various memes. The resemblance of the artist to Ron Weasley, the fictional character from the Harry Potter series, was also highlighted and compared.

== Credits and personnel ==
Credits are adapted from Genius.

- Paulo Londra – songwriter, vocals
- Federico Vindver – songwriter, musical production, record engineering, programming, drum, bass, guitar, keyboards
- Kiel Feher – drum
- Andrew Synowiec – guitar
- Ignacio Portales – record engineering assistance
- Nicholas Acosta – record engineering assistance

== Charts ==
=== Weekly charts ===
Chart performance for "Nublado"
Chart (2022)	Peak position
Argentina Hot 100 (Billboard)	23
Argentina (Monitor Latino)	14
Argentina Latin (Monitor Latino)	12
Argentina National (Monitor Latino)	4
Honduras Pop (Monitor Latino)	10
Nicaragua Pop (Monitor Latino)	15
Paraguay Pop (Monitor Latino)	8

=== Monthly charts ===
Monthly chart performance for "Nublado"
Chart (2022)	Peak position
Paraguay (SGP)	74

== Release history ==
Release dates and formats for "Nublado"
Region	Date	Format(s)	Version	Label	Ref.
Various	June 29, 2022	Digital download; streaming	Original	Warner	
Various	November 21, 2022	Digital download; streaming	Travis Barker remix	Warner	
