= Julieta (song) =

Single by Paulo Londra

from the album Back to the Game
- Language: Spanish
- English title: "Juliet"
- Released: August 4, 2022
- Genre: Reggaeton
- Length: 3:04
- Label: Warner
- Songwriters: Paulo Londra; Federico Vindver; Alejandro Ramírez Suárez
- Producers: Federico Vindver; Sky Rompiendo

Paulo Londra singles chronology
"Cansado" (2022)	"Julieta" (2022)	"Noche de Novela" (2022)

Music video
- "Julieta" on YouTube

"Julieta" is a song by the Argentine rapper and singer Paulo Londra. It was released by Warner Music Latina as the sixth single from his second studio album Back to the Game (2022). The song marked Londra's return to the reggaeton genre that made him known in 2018 and 2019 for his singles "Adán y Eva" and "Tal Vez" respectively.

== Background and composition ==
In July 2022, Londra revealed in an Instagram post that he would release a different song every Thursday between that month and August, among which "Julieta" was announced, which would be released on August 4, 2022. On August 1, 2022, Londra released a teaser of the music video.

"Julieta" is a romantic reggaeton song composed by Londra, Federico Vindver and Alejandro Ramírez Suárez, while the musical production was done by Sky Rompiendo and Vindver. The title of the song is inspired by the character Juliet from William Shakespeare's romantic tragedy Romeo and Juliet (1597), where she cannot live her love with her lover Romeo. The lyrics of the song, precisely, represent an impossible love that drives Londra crazy for not knowing if it is reciprocated.

== Commercial performance ==
On its first day of release, "Julieta" achieved two and a half million views on YouTube, placing the video at the top of the music trends in Argentina. This resulted in the song debuting at number 82 on the Billboard Argentina Hot 100 on the week dated August 13, 2022 and remained in the ranking for three weeks.

== Music video ==
The music video was directed by Gabriel Bosisio, produced by Buena Productora and was filmed in Buenos Aires. The video clip is based on the elements of 80's horror films and shows Londra hospitalized and strapped to a gurney in a psychiatric hospital. In the doctors' attempt to give him an electroshock, Londra manages to escape from the place, while the medical staff tries to capture him and other patients who started a rebellion in the center.

== Credits and personnel ==
Credits are adapted from Genius.

- Paulo Londra – songwriter, vocals
- Federico Vindver – songwriter, musical production, synthesizer, recording engineer, programming
- Sky Rompiendo – songwriter, musical production, synthesizer, programming
- Patrizio "Teezio" Pigliapoco – mix engineer, mastering engineer
- Ignacio Portales – assistant mix engineer

== Charts ==
Chart performance for "Julieta"
Chart (2022)	Peak position
Argentina Hot 100 (Billboard)	82

== Release history ==
Release dates and formats for "Julieta"
Region	Date	Format	Label(s)	Ref.
Various	November 23, 2022	Digital download; streaming	Warner	
