= Necio (Paulo Londra song) =

Single by Paulo Londra featuring Lit Killah

from the album Back to the Game
- Language: Spanish
- English title: "Foolish"
- Released: November 23, 2022
- Recorded: 2019–2022
- Genre: Urban pop; latin trap
- Length: 3:38
- Label: Warner
- Songwriters: Paulo Londra; Mauro Román Monzón; Daniel Ismael Real
- Producer: Big One

Paulo Londra singles chronology
"A Veces" (2022)	"Necio" (2022)	"Posdata" (2024)

Lit Killah singles chronology
"Mi Culpa" (2022)	"Necio" (2022)	"Olé Olé" (2022)

Music video
- "Necio" on YouTube

"Necio" is a song by the Argentine rapper and singer Paulo Londra featuring fellow Argentine rapper and singer Lit Killah. The two artists wrote the track with Big One, who produced it. Warner Music Latina released the song on November 23, 2022, as the tenth and final single from Londra's second studio album, Back to the Game (2022).

== Background and release ==
The first rumors of a possible collaboration between Londra and Lit Killah emerged in December 2019 when the two artists made a series of social media posts that warned of a future musical work by producer Big One. That month, Paulo published a video showing a fragment of the song alongside the hashtag "Nitidez", which indicated the possible name of the song. However, the final production of the song and its release was frustrated by the legal conflict that Londra had with Big Ligas, his former record label that prevented him from releasing music.

In June 2021, Lit Killah again referred to the collaboration with Londra via Instagram, assuring that "when that song comes out we will break it with Paulo" and added that "no matter how much he has not made music, he remains the number one in Argentina". In August 2021, Lit Killah revealed that during the process of composing the single they wrote a second song that would be part of his debut album MAWZ (2021), but could not be included due to Londra's trial with Big Ligas. In November 2021, Lit Killah dedicated his first concert at the Gran Rex to Londra, where she revealed that the rapper was still on trial and asked his fans to give him all their support.

In February 2022, after winning the legal battle against his former record label, Londra posted an Instagram story, showing himself working in a recording studio with Lit Killah and Big One, reactivating rumors of a collaboration and possibly the song they had composed in 2019. In June 2022, Lit Killah confirmed that the collaboration was ready to be published and that it was the song they had written three years ago. On November 17, 2022, Paulo officially announced on his Instagram account the collaboration with Lit Killah, revealing that the title of the song was "Necio" and that its premiere would be on November 23, simultaneously with the release of his second album Back to the Game.

== Composition and lyrics ==
The song was written by Londra and Lit Killah, while the song was produced by Big One. The first version of the song was composed and recorded, in December 2019, in an armed studio in a property located in San Rafael in the province of Mendoza. After the single was released, Lit Killah revealed that several changes were made to the original version to adapt it to the newer musical sounds. The lyric talks about instability in romantic relationships.

== Commercial performance ==
The single, in the first week of December, debuted at number 59 on the Billboard Argentina Hot 100. In its first 24 hours, "Necio" managed to get more than two million views on YouTube, which led to it ranked at number 12 of the platform's musical trends in Uruguay and after a week of its debut accumulated more than eight million views, positioning itself in the top places in Argentina.

== Music video ==
The video was directed by Agustín Portela and shot in Buenos Aires. The theme of the video shows Londra and Lit Killah as two recruits who take a shy young man to an institution called N.E.C.I.O.: Nueva Escuela de Capacitación Integral de Optimistas (English: New School for the Integral Training of Optimists), where he is assisted by a group of professionals who will prepare him to acquire new forms of communication in order to conquer the girl he feels attracted to, following instructions such as "do not call", "not stalkear" and "not unlock" that are written on a plate and all is done under the supervision of the two artists.

== Live performance ==
On November 23, 2022, the single was first performed live by both artists in front of fifty thousand people in Las Tejas Park in the city of Córdoba as part of the release of the album Back to the Game. In December 2022, "Necio" was featured at the Movistar Arena during the SnipeZ Tour of Lit Killah, where Londra appeared as a guest artist.

== Credits and personnel ==
Credits are adapted from Genius.

- Paulo Londra – songwriter, vocals
- Lit Killah – songwriter, vocals
- Big One – songwriter, musical production, synthesizer, recording engineer, programming
- Patrizio "Teezio" Pigliapoco – mix engineer
- Dale Becker – mastering engineer
- Ignacio Portales – assistant mix engineer

== Charts ==
Chart performance for "Necio"
Chart (2022–2023)	Peak position
Argentina Hot 100 (Billboard)	59
Argentina National Songs (Monitor Latino)	17
Paraguay (SGP)	163

== Release history ==
Release dates and formats for "Necio"
Region	Date	Format	Label(s)	Ref.
Various	November 23, 2022	Digital download; streaming	Warner	
