= Power of Soul =

Power of Soul may refer to:

- Power of Soul (band), a soul/funk band from Argentina
- Power of Soul (album), an album by Idris Muhammad
- Power of Soul, 1968 album by Swedish singer Jerry Williams
- Power of Soul, also known as Power to Love, 1970 song by Jimi Hendrix, first published on Band of Gypsys

== See also ==
- Soul Power (disambiguation)
