= Chance (Paulo Londra song) =

Single by Paulo Londra

from the album Back to the Game
- Language: Spanish
- English title: "Opportunity"
- Released: April 6, 2022
- Genre: Latin ballad; Latin R&B; Pop; Latin trap
- Length: 3:24
- Label: Warner
- Songwriters: Paulo Londra; Federico Vindver
- Producer: Federico Vindver

Paulo Londra singles chronology
| "Plan A" (2022) | "Chance" (2022) | "Paulo Londra: Bzrp Music Sessions, Vol. 23" (2022) |

Music video
- "Chance" on YouTube

"Chance" is a song by Argentine rapper and singer Paulo Londra. It was released on April 6, 2022, through Warner Music Latina, as the second single from his second studio album, Back to the Game (2022). It was written by Londra with Federico Vindver and produced by Vindver.

== Background and composition ==
On April 4, 2022, and two weeks before the release of "Plan A", Londra surprisingly posted a video on his Instagram account announcing the launch of a new song, stating "there's a chance that a little track might drop in a few days", accompanied by a black screen with a black plaque at the end indicating that the premiere date would be April 6. The next day, Paulo confirmed that the title of the song was "Chance" and released a short preview of the music video.

"Chance" is a latin ballad, latin R&B and pop song with latin trap influences. It was written by Londra with Federico Vindver, and produced by Vindver. The lyrics of the song are about a love story at first sight, where the man becomes captivated by the beauty of the woman he doesn't know, but he wants to confess his love to her and ask for a chance.

== Commercial performance ==
In Argentina, "Chance" debuted at number 4 on the Billboard Argentina Hot 100, becoming the best debut song of the week in the chart.

== Music video ==
The music video for the single was directed by Facundo Ballve, with the theme set in a typical roadside bar. The setting includes a pool table, a jukebox, and a small stage where the singer performs the song for an intimate audience. Simultaneously, it narrates a short love story when a young woman enters the bar, portrayed by Argentine model Micaela Etcheverry, immediately capturing the artist's attention. In less than 24 hours, the video managed to accumulate over 8 million views, earning it the number 1 spot on the music trends ranking on YouTube in Argentina.

== Credits and personnel ==
Credits are adapted from Jaxsta.

- Paulo Londra – songwriter, vocals
- Federico Vindver – songwriter, musical production, record engineering, programming, drum, bass, guitar, keyboards
- Patrizio "Teezio" Pigliapoco – mix engineering
- Ignacio Portales – mix engineering assistance
- Dale Becker – record master
- Connor Hedge – record master assistance
- Noah McCorkle – record master assistance

== Charts ==
=== Weekly charts ===
Chart performance for "Chance"
| Chart (2022) | Peak position |
|---|---|
| Argentina Hot 100 (Billboard) | 4 |
| Argentina (Monitor Latino) | 13 |
| Argentina Digital Songs (CAPIF) | 3 |
| Bolivia (Billboard) | 8 |
| Bolivia (Monitor Latino) | 4 |
| Ecuador (Billboard) | 11 |
| Global 200 (Billboard) | 93 |
| Paraguay (Monitor Latino) | 11 |
| Peru (Billboard) | 10 |
| Spain (Promusicae) | 39 |

=== Monthly charts ===
Monthly chart performance for "Chance"
| Chart (2022) | Peak position |
|---|---|
| Paraguay (SGP) | 17 |
| Uruguay (CUD) | 16 |

=== Year-end charts ===
Year-end chart performance for "Chance"
| Chart (2022) | Position |
|---|---|
| Paraguay (Monitor Latino) | 68 |

== Release history ==
Release dates and formats for "Chance"
| Region | Date | Version | Label | Ref. |
|---|---|---|---|---|
| Various | April 6, 2022 | Digital download; streaming | Warner | |
