= Party en el Barrio =

Single by Paulo Londra featuring Duki

from the album Back to the Game
- Language: Spanish
- English title: "Party in the Neighborhood"
- Released: September 14, 2022
- Genre: Latin trap
- Length: 3:56
- Label: Warner
- Songwriters: Paulo Londra; Mauro Ezequiel Lombardo; Federico Vindver; José Velázquez; Rio Root
- Producers: Federico Vindver; Ángel "BebeTruth" López; Rio Root

Paulo Londra singles chronology
"Noche de Novela" (2022)	"Party en el Barrio" (2022)	"A Veces" (2022)

Duki singles chronology
"Pantera" (2022)	"Party en el Barrio" (2022)	"I Dance" (2022)

Music video
- "Party en el Barrio" on YouTube

"Party en el Barrio" is a song by Argentine rapper and singer Paulo Londra featuring fellow Argentine rapper and singer Duki. It was released on September 14, 2022, through Warner Music Latina, as the eighth single from Londra's second album Back to the Game (2022).

== Background and release ==
Londra and Duki met during their adolescence, competing in El Quinto Escalón and sharing other freestyle events. In 2017, both artists came together for the first time to record the remix "Astral", an unofficial song released on YouTube by Wolf and Sync. On September 9, 2022, the official announcement was made for the single "Party en el Barrio", marking their first collaboration. Later, they posted some snippets on their social media to promote the song. The single was released on September 14, 2022.

== Composition and lyrics ==
The single was composed by Londra, Duki, José Velázquez, Federico Vindver, and Rio Root. "Party en el Barrio" is a latin trap song and features an interpolation of a freestyle battle, where Londra and Duki were opponents during their time in El Quinto Escalón. The lyrics talk about the beginnings of both artists in the world of rap and the obstacles they had to overcome to become the leading figures in the genre.

== Commercial performance ==
In the week of September 19, 2022, just five days after its release, "Party en el Barrio" debuted at position number 63 on the Billboard Argentina Hot 100. The following week, the single climbed to number 8, achieving a 55-position ascent on the chart, earning it the title of "Greatest Gainer" of the week.

== Music video ==
The music video was directed by Agustín Portela in Buenos Aires and premiered on Londra's official YouTube channel. The video shows, on one hand, the rappers eating together at a table on the sidewalk surrounded by a crowd, and on the other hand, on an urban bus and drinking fernet on a couch, while a street party unfolds around them. On the other hand, Londra and Duki are dressed in suits, giving a television interview that gets out of control due to the studio's destruction.

== Live performance ==
On November 12, 2022, the song was performed live for the first time during the third date of Duki's presentation at Vélez Sarsfield Stadium, where Londra appeared as one of the surprise guest artists.

== Credits and personnel ==
Credits are adapted from Genius.

- Paulo Londra – songwriter, vocals
- Duki – songwriter, vocals
- Ángel López – songwriter, musical production
- Federico Vindver – songwriter, musical production, keyboards, bass, recording engineer, programming
- Rio Root – songwriter, musical production
- Federico Yesan Rojas – recording engineer
- Patrizio "Teezio" Pigliapoco – mixing engineering
- Mike Tucci – mastering engineering
- Ignacio Portales – mixing engineering assistance

== Charts ==
=== Weekly charts ===
Chart performance for "Party en el Barrio"
Chart (2022)	Peak position
Argentina Hot 100 (Billboard)	8
Bolivia (Billboard)	22
Costa Rica (FONOTICA)	20
Costa Rica Urban (Monitor Latino)	10
Global 200 (Billboard)	186
Spain (Promusicae)	30

=== Monthly charts ===
Monthly chart performance for "Party en el Barrio"
Chart (2022)	Peak position
Paraguay (SGP)	81

== Certifications ==
Certifications for "Party en el Barrio"
Region	Certification	Certified units/sales
Spain (Promusicae)	Gold	30,000^{‡}
^{‡} Sales+streaming figures based on certification alone.

== Release history ==
Release dates and formats for "Party en el Barrio"
Region	Date	Format(s)	Label	Ref.
Various	September 14, 2022	Digital download; streaming	Warner	
