= A Veces =

Single by Paulo Londra and Feid

from the album Back to the Game
- Language: Spanish
- English title: "Sometimes"
- Released: November 3, 2022
- Genre: Reggaeton
- Length: 3:11
- Label: Warner Latina
- Songwriters: Paulo Londra; Salomón Villada Hoyos; Federico Vindver
- Producers: Federico Vindver; Rio Root

Paulo Londra singles chronology
"Party en el Barrio" (2022)	"A Veces" (2022)	"Necio" (2022)

Feid singles chronology
"Salir Con Vida" (2022)	"A Veces" (2022)	"Malibu" (2022)

Music video
- "A Veces" on YouTube

"A Veces" is a song by Argentine rapper and singer Paulo Londra and Colombian singer Feid. It was released on November 3, 2022, through Warner Music Latina, as the ninth single from Londra's second studio album Back to the Game (2022).

== Background and release ==
The rumors of a possible collaboration between Londra and Feid sparked when the Argentine artist posted on his social media an Instagram story in which he was listening to the song "Normal" by the Colombian singer. On November 2, 2022, both artists confirmed that they would release the single "A Veces", and that it would be part of Londra's second album.

== Composition and lyrics ==
"A Veces" is a reggaeton song that incorporates elements of percussion into its melody. The lyrics of the song deal with a feeling of nostalgia towards a desire for a past romantic interest, where there was reciprocity at some point. However, at present, everything has changed, including the emotions and the dynamics of the relationship. The song was composed in a single day by Londra and Feid, while the production was handled by Federico Vindver and Rio Root.

== Critical reception ==
The single was positively received by various specialized media, which mentioned that in the song, "the essence of both stars is highlighted to perfection, showcasing the powerful lyrical skill of Paulo Londra and the distinctive voice for which Feid has become known".

== Commercial performance ==
In its first 24 hours, the song managed to accumulate more than two million views on YouTube, placing it at the top of the music trends in Argentina. In Spain, the song managed to reach the eighth position on the music charts of Spotify.

== Music video ==
The music video was premiered on November 3, 2022, on Londra's official YouTube channel. It was directed by Facundo Ballve and filmed in the city of Miami. The video shows Londra and Feid in the midst of the composition and production process of the song in the recording studios, as well as scenes on a rooftop illuminated by red neon lights.

== Credits and personnel ==
Credits are adapted from Genius.

- Paulo Londra – songwriter, vocals
- Feid – songwriter, vocals
- Federico Vindver – songwriter, musical production, programming, keyboards, bass, guitar, synthesizer, record engineering
- Rio Root – musical production
- Patrizio "Teezio" Pigliapoco – mixing engineering
- Dale Becker – mastering engineering
- Ignacio Portales – mixing engineering assistance

== Charts ==
=== Weekly charts ===
Chart performance for "A Veces"
Chart (2022)	Peak position
Argentina Hot 100 (Billboard)	50
Argentina (Monitor Latino)	17
Bolivia (Billboard)	17
Colombia (Billboard)	9
Colombia Streaming (PROMÚSICA)	6
Costa Rica (FONOTICA)	19
Costa Rica Urban (Monitor Latino)	11
Global Excl. US (Billboard)	130
Spain (Promusicae)	13

=== Monthly charts ===
Monthly chart performance for "A Veces"
Chart (2022)	Peak position
Paraguay (SGP)	44

== Certifications ==
Certifications for "A Veces"
Region	Certification	Certified units/sales
Spain (Promusicae)	Gold	30,000^{‡}
^{‡} Sales+streaming figures based on certification alone.

== Release history ==
Release dates and formats for "A Veces"
Region	Date	Format(s)	Label	Ref.
Various	November 3, 2022	Digital download; streaming	Warner Latina	
