= Noche de Novela =

Single by Paulo Londra and Ed Sheeran

from the album Back to the Game
- Language: Spanish • English
- English title: "Novel Night"
- Released: August 11, 2022
- Genre: R&B
- Length: 3:11
- Label: Warner
- Songwriters: Paulo Londra; Ed Sheeran; Federico Vindver
- Producer: Federico Vindver

Paulo Londra singles chronology
"Julieta" (2022)	"Noche de Novela" (2022)	"Party en el Barrio" (2022)

Ed Sheeran singles chronology
"Are You Entertained" (2022)	"Noche de Novela" (2022)	"My G" (2022)

Music video
- "Noche de Novela" on YouTube

"Noche de Novela" is a song by Argentine rapper and singer Paulo Londra and English singer Ed Sheeran. Taken from Londra's second studio album, Back to the Game (2022), it was released as the seventh single from the album on 11 August 2022, by Warner Music Latina.

== Background and release ==
In 2019, Londra and Sheeran had their first professional encounter, as they had worked together on the song "Nothing on You", which belongs to Sheeran's fourth studio album, No. 6 Collaborations Project. From this point on, both artists stayed in touch, even during the time when Londra couldn't release music due to his conflict with Big Ligas. In November 2021, during an interview with MTV Argentina, Sheeran publicly voiced his support for Londra in his contractual situation with the record label, stating, "I can only think about how wrong it is that they won't let him release his music. How can you hinder the talent of a guy like Paulo? It's unbelievable. In fact, I recently had a deep conversation about this with J Balvin, and we both agreed that it's a crime that he can't release his music. The person responsible for this situation needs to change their stance quickly". In reference to a possible second collaboration, he expressed:

Every time he wants to collaborate, I'll always be there. I would literally do anything for him whenever he needs it. He knows this, and I told him: every time I can help him, I will.

— Sheeran about Londra, MTV Argentina

In June 2022, Londra revealed in the music video for his single "Luces" that he had four unreleased collaborations. In July, he announced through his social media the release of a series of the four songs, among which he unveiled "Noche de Novela", also revealing that it would be a collaboration with Sheeran and that its release date was scheduled on 11 August 2022. In the days leading up to the song's release, both artists began to share several teasers of the music video, as well as behind-the-scenes footage of the recording.

== Composition and lyrics ==
The song was co-written by Londra and Sheeran along with Federico Vindver, who also handled the production of the single. "Noche de Novela" is three minutes and 11 seconds long and the lyrics are divided into Spanish and English, incorporating rap as accompaniment. The single was described as an R&B track with pop influences, supported by an up-tempo beat. The lyrical content includes themes such as friendship, getting rid of negative vibes, and living life to the fullest.

== Critical reception ==
The song received positive reviews from critics. Ana Escobar Rivas of the radio network Los 40 noted that "this Anglo-Spanish combo fits perfectly" and that "both voices blend really well". Oh Magazine described the song as having "a pop rhythm in which both artists perform very well, breaking down the romance that characterizes them". Lucía Castillo of Ok Diario mentioned that Londra and Sheeran do not disappoint with "Noche de novela", expressing that the single has "a very catchy rhythm and melody that makes you unable to stop listening to it". In regards to the aesthetics of the music video, Alicia Fortanet from the Cadena 100 website described it as "spectacular".

In a dual review for La Voz del Interior, Juan Manuel Pairone wrote that Londra in the chorus of the track "once again finds that ability to captivate with his simplicity and naturalness as a performer", while Diego Tabachnik gave a more negative opinion, saying that "Noche de novela seems like one more in the bunch, lacking that spark of simple guys that characterized both artists". However, María Solando of The Honey Pop pointed out that Londra and Sheeran effortlessly blend English and Spanish, coming together to provide an incredible musical bridge.

== Commercial performance ==
In the first week, "Noche de Novela" entered at number 66 on the Billboard Argentina Hot 100, marking the highest debut of a song that week. In its second week, the single managed to reach position number 40 and was named the Greatest Gainer of the week, climbing 26 positions compared to the previous week. In its third week, the song reached its peak, securing position 39 on the chart.

== Music video ==
The music video was directed by Greg Davenport and was filmed in London during a night session. The video depicts Londra leaving a supermarket to meet Sheeran on the street, which is characterized by neon lights, where both artists celebrate with several friends while drinking beer bottles and some cocktails.

== Credits and personnel ==
Credits are adapted from Genius.

- Paulo Londra – songwriter, vocals
- Ed Sheeran – songwriter, vocals
- Federico Vindver – songwriter, musical production, programming, keyboards, bass, electric and acoustic guitar
- Patrizio "Teezio" Pigliapoco – mixing engineering
- Dale Becker – mastering engineering
- Ashton Miranda – voice engineering
- Noah McCorkle – mastering engineering assistance
- Ignacio Portales – mixing engineering assistance

== Charts ==
=== Weekly charts ===
Chart performance for "Noche de Novela"
Chart (2022)	Peak position
Argentina Hot 100 (Billboard)	39
Argentina (Monitor Latino)	8
Chile Urban (Monitor Latino)	10
Ecuador Urban (Monitor Latino)	16
Panama (PRODUCE)	50
Panama Urban (Monitor Latino)	12
Peru Urban (Monitor Latino)	17

=== Monthly charts ===
Monthly chart performance for "Noche de Novela"
Chart (2022)	Peak position
Paraguay (SGP)	57

== Release history ==
Release dates and formats for "Noche de Novela"
Region	Date	Format(s)	Label	Ref.
Various	August 11, 2022	Digital download; streaming	Warner	
