= Paulo Londra: Bzrp Music Sessions, Vol. 23 =

2022 song by Argentine artists Bizarrap and Paulo Londra

Single by Bizarrap and Paulo Londra
- Language: Spanish
- Released: April 25, 2022
- Recorded: 2022
- Studio: BZRP Studio (Ramos Mejía, Buenos Aires, Argentina)
- Genre: Reggaeton • electropop • Latin trap
- Length: 4:17
- Label: Dale Play Records
- Lyricist: Paulo Ezequiel Londra
- Producer: Bizarrap

Bizarrap singles chronology
"Residente: Bzrp Music Sessions, Vol. 49" (2022)	"Paulo Londra: Bzrp Music Sessions, Vol. 23" (2022)	"Villano Antillano: Bzrp Music Sessions, Vol. 51" (2022)

Paulo Londra singles chronology
"Chance" (2022)	"Paulo Londra: Bzrp Music Sessions, Vol. 23" (2022)	"Nublado" (2022)

Music video
- "Paulo Londra: Bzrp Music Sessions, Vol. 23" on YouTube

"Paulo Londra: Bzrp Music Sessions, Vol. 23" is a song by the Argentine producer Bizarrap and Argentine rapper and singer Paulo Londra. It was released on 25 April 2022, through Dale Play Records, as part of the BZRP Music Sessions by the former.

== Background ==
On 23 November 2019, Londra contacted Bizarrap asking him if he wanted to do a BZRP Music Sessions, with Londra exclusively asking him for the 23rd session. Speculations about the collaboration began in March 2020, when Bizarrap released video for #Session24 on his YouTube channel with trap singer Daniel Ribba, which started rumors that Londra had been selected for the previous session.

In September 2021, Puerto Rican rapper Myke Towers accidentally revealed that session number 23 was definitely Londra's, after Towers requested that session from Bizarrap, but the latter told him it was already reserved for Londra. In December of that year, Bizarrap released session number 48 with Tiago PZK, who references the session whispering the line "Our thing is a secret Biza Session 23", which led to reviving the wait of the song's release again.

The song was slated to come out in 2020, but Londra was unable to continue releasing music due to a legal conflict between him and music producers Kristoman and Ovy on the Drums, and his former label Big Ligas. The conflict stopped the song from being released, and it was considered the "lost" session of the two artists.

On 23 April 2022, Bizarrap posted a statement on Twitter, officially announcing that the next session to be released would be number 23, but without announcing the artist. However, the format the statement was made in was a reference to the letter published by American basketball player Michael Jordan in 1995 to announce his return to the NBA, which sparked fan speculation that it was Londra's session due to his love of basketball, his constant use of the number 23 in his musical work, and his recent musical comeback. On 24 April 2022, Bizarrap made a live broadcast on Instagram where he announced that he was going to make a post. Minutes later, he confirmed that the session belonged to Londra and made a request for 23 million comments in a post on the social network to release it, which made it the most commented photo on the site.

== Music video ==
The official music video was released on April 25, 2022, reachin 100 million views in 119 days. As of May 2024, it has more than 130 million views on YouTube.

== Charts ==
=== Weekly charts ===
Chart performance for "Paulo Londra: Bzrp Music Sessions, Vol. 23"
Chart (2022)	Peak position
Argentina (Argentina Hot 100)	1
Bolivia (Billboard)	3
Bolivia Latin (Monitor Latino)	14
Chile (Billboard)	10
Colombia (Billboard)	15
Colombia Streaming (Promúsica)	20
Costa Rica (FONOTICA)	3
Costa Rica Urban (Monitor Latino)	16
Ecuador (Billboard)	6
Global 200 (Billboard)	21
Global Excl. US (Billboard)	12
Mexico (Billboard)	12
Panama (PRODUCE)	34
Paraguay Urban (Monitor Latino)	13
Peru (Billboard)	8
Spain (PROMUSICAE)	1

=== Monthly charts ===
Chart (2022)	Peak position
Paraguay (SGP)	80
Uruguay (CUD)	1

=== Year-end charts ===
Chart (2022)	Peak position
Paraguay (Monitor Latino)	93
Spain (PROMUSICAE)	77

== Certifications ==
Certifications for "Paulo Londra: Bzrp Music Sessions, Vol. 23"
Region	Certification	Certified units/sales
Mexico (AMPROFON)	Gold	70,000^{‡}
Spain (PROMUSICAE)	2× Platinum	120,000^{‡}
Streaming
Chile (PROFOVI)	Gold	10,395,779
^{‡} Sales+streaming figures based on certification alone.
