= Soul Power (disambiguation) =

"Soul Power" is a song by James Brown.

Soul Power may also refer to:

- Soul Power!, 1967 album by Richard Holmes
- Soul Power (album), 2014 album by Curtis Harding
- Soul Power (film), 2008 documentary film
- Soul Power, a superhero from the animated television series Static Shock
- Soul Power, an ability used by the Street Fighter character Rose

== See also ==
- Power of Soul (disambiguation)
