= Luces =

Single by Paulo Londra

from the album Back to the Game
- Language: Spanish
- English title: "Lights"
- Released: June 29, 2022
- Genre: EDM
- Length: 2:52
- Label: Warner
- Songwriters: Paulo Londra; Federico Javier Colazo; Federico Vindver; Matías Andrés Rapacioli
- Producers: Federico Vindver; Hot Plug

Paulo Londra singles chronology
"Nublado" (2022)	"Luces" (2022)	"Cansado" (2022)

Music video
- "Luces" on YouTube

"Luces" is a song by Argentine rapper and singer Paulo Londra. It was part of a double release, on June 29, 2022, through Warner Music Latina. The song was released as the fourth single from his second studio album Back to the Game (2022). It was co-written by Federico Colazo, Federico Vindver and Matías Rapacioli, and was produced by Vindver and Hot Plug.

== Background ==
In a TikTok live stream, where Londra was celebrating the release of his single "Nublado", and 35 minutes after its release, he unexpectedly announced the immediate launch of "Luces", his fourth single for his second studio album.

== Critical reception ==
Laura Coca from the radio station network Los 40 highlighted that with this release, Londra demonstrates "that he is one of the most versatile artists we have in the current urban industry" and his fans on social media "have showered the artist with compliments and praises" for his song and talent, as he ventured into "a genre completely different from the one he has been working in for years".

== Commercial performance ==
"Luces" debuted at number 25 on the Billboard Argentina Hot 100, marking the second highest debut of a song for that week on the chart, trailing behind "Nublado", another single by Londra.

== Music video ==
The music video was directed by Agustín Portela and is set in a nightclub, where Londra plays the role of a waiter who, at a point in the night, is required to take over the DJ booth to play music after the DJ leaves. At first, he doesn't seem to convince the audience until he decides to play the song "Luces", which gets everyone dancing. Throughout the video, Londra dropped an easter egg that he would release four musical collaborations.

== Credits and personnel ==
Credits are adapted from Genius.

- Paulo Londra – songwriter, vocals
- Federico Vindver – songwriter, musical production, record engineering, programming, synthesizer, drum, bass, guitar, keyboards
- Matías Andrés Rapacioli – songwriter, synthesizer
- Federico Javier Colazo – songwriter, programming, synthesizer
- Hot Plug – musical production
- Ignacio Portales – mix engineering assistance

== Charts ==
=== Weekly charts ===
Chart performance for "Luces"
Chart (2022)	Peak position
Argentina Hot 100 (Billboard)	25
Ecuador Pop (Monitor Latino)	19
Global Excl. US (Billboard)	192
Honduras Pop (Monitor Latino)	9
Mexico (Billboard Espanol Airplay)	25
Spain (Promusicae)	59

=== Monthly charts ===
Monthly chart performance for "Luces"
Chart (2022)	Peak position
Paraguay (SGP)	82

== Release history ==
Release dates and formats for "Luces"
Region	Date	Format(s)	Label	Ref.
Various	June 29, 2022	Digital download; streaming	Warner	
