= Are You Entertained =

2022 single by Russ and Ed Sheeran

Single by Russ and Ed Sheeran
- Released: July 22, 2022
- Length: 2:36
- Label: Asylum; Diemon
- Songwriters: Russell Vitale; Ed Sheeran; Fred Gibson
- Producer: Fred Again

Russ singles chronology
"Paddington Freestyle" (2022)	"Are You Entertained" (2022)	"Soft Life" (2022)

Ed Sheeran singles chronology
"For My Hand" (2022)	"Are You Entertained" (2022)	"Noche de Novela" (2022)

Music video
- "Are You Entertained" on YouTube

"Are You Entertained" is a song by American rapper Russ and English singer-songwriter Ed Sheeran. It was released as a single through Asylum Records and Diemon on July 22, 2022. The song was solely produced by Fred Again, who co-wrote the song with the artists.

== Charts ==
Chart performance for "Are You Entertained"
Chart (2022)	Peak position
Argentina Hot 100 (Billboard)	97
Australia (ARIA)	45
Canada Hot 100 (Billboard)	41
Czech Republic Airplay (ČNS IFPI)	61
Global 200 (Billboard)	69
Hungary (Stream Top 40)	35
Ireland (IRMA)	43
Lithuania (AGATA)	83
Netherlands (Single Top 100)	79
New Zealand (Recorded Music NZ)	20
Norway (VG-lista)	40
Slovakia (Singles Digitál Top 100)	42
South Africa Streaming (TOSAC)	71
Sweden (Sverigetopplistan)	52
Switzerland (Schweizer Hitparade)	36
UK Singles (OCC)	47
US Billboard Hot 100	97
US Hot R&B/Hip-Hop Songs (Billboard)	26
US Rhythmic Airplay (Billboard)	31
