= Osvaldo Peredo (musician) =

Argentine singer (1930–2022)

Osvaldo J. Peredo
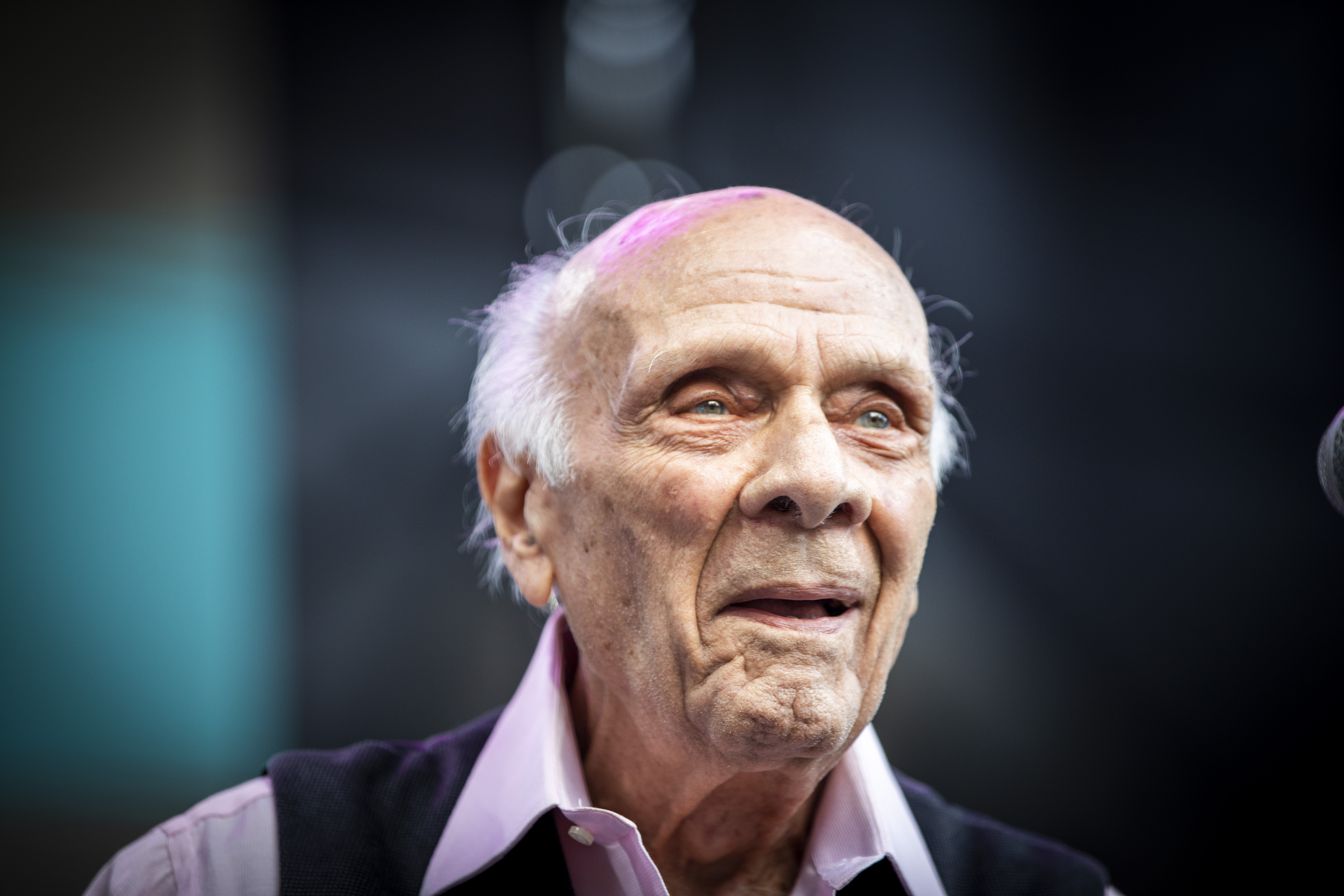
- Born: 1930; Boedo, Buenos Aires, Argentina
- Died: 24 January 2022
- Occupation: Singer

Osvaldo J. Peredo (1930 – 24 January 2022) was an Argentine tango singer. He was a follower of Carlos Gardel. He is credited with the renaissance of the tango in Argentina.

== Biography ==
Peredo was born in 1930 in Boedo, a traditional neighborhood in the city of Buenos Aires, Argentina. Beginning when he was 17, he played football at Club Atlético San Lorenzo de Almagro. Peredo first had a job working in a jewelry factory and then working for the National Meteorological Service. He was good enough at football to be selected to play for Barranquilla Fútbol Club in Colombia. There he fell in love with the music of Carlos Gardel and began his musical career. He sang throughout Colombia and Venezuela before returning to Argentina. In the 21st century he received widespread acclaim for his performances at El Boliche de Roberto.

Peredo died on 24 January 2022, at the age of 91.

== Awards ==
- 2014 - Outstanding Personality of the Culture of the City of Buenos Aires
