= Claudisabel =

Portuguese musical artist (1976–2022)

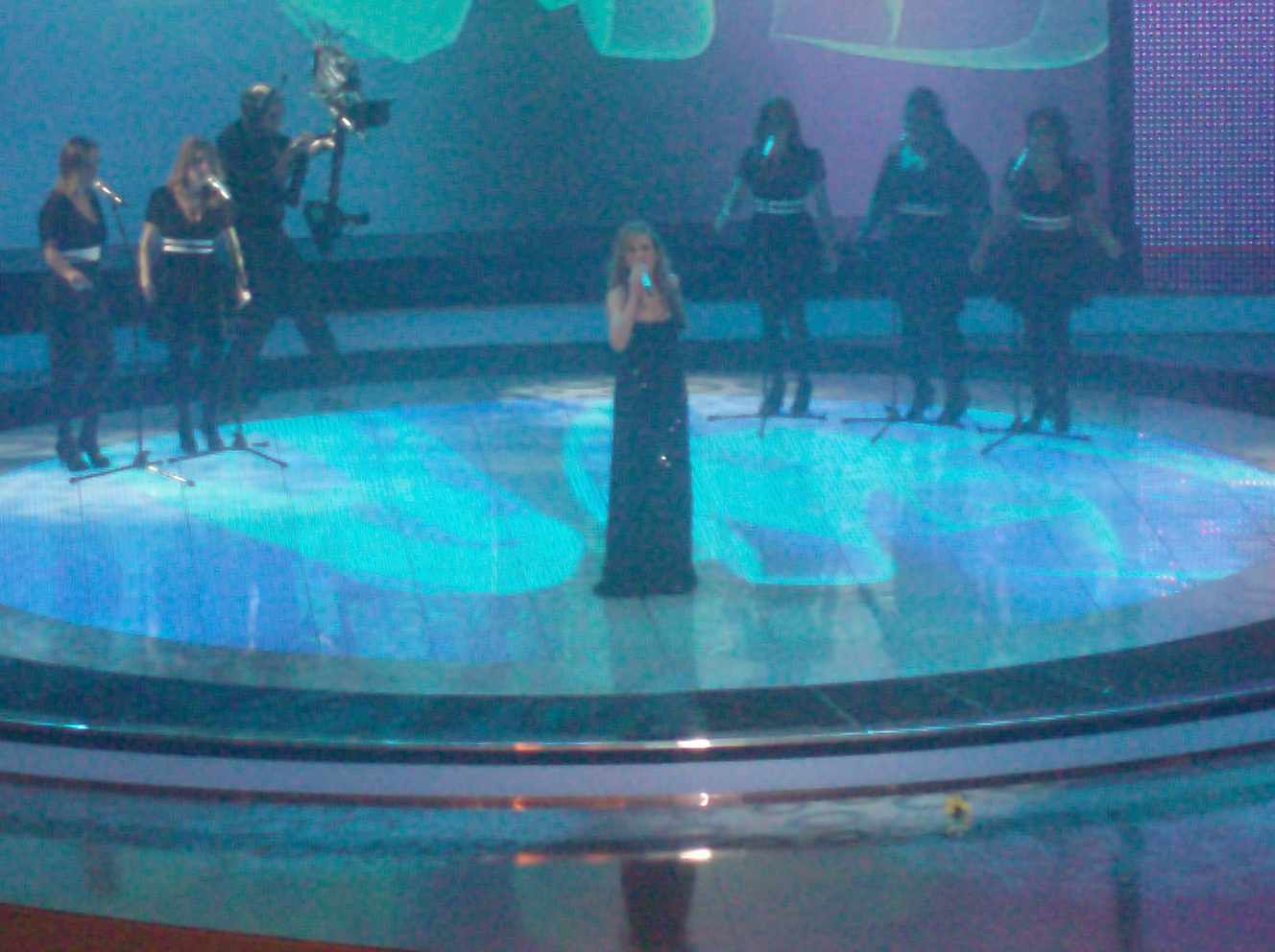
- Claudisabel in 2010

Background information
- Birth name: Cláudia Isabel Leiria Madeira
- Born: 4 October 1976; Faro, Portugal
- Died: 19 December 2022 (aged 46); Alcácer do Sal, Portugal
- Genres: Popular music
- Occupation: Singer
- Instrument: Vocals
- Years active: 1995–2022
- Labels: Nucafé Records

Cláudia Isabel Leiria Madeira (4 October 1976 – 19 December 2022), known professionally as Claudisabel, was a Portuguese singer.

In 2010, she competed in the Festival da Canção where she reached the semifinals with the song Contra Tudo e Todos.

Claudisabel was killed in a car accident on 19 December 2022, at the age of 46.

== Discography ==
- Dizias tu, pensava eu (1995)
- Pensei com o coração (1998)
- Preciso de um herói (1999)
- Meu Sonho Azul (2002)
- Preto no branco (2006)
- Quem és tu (2009)
- Contra tudo e todos (2010)
- Condenada (2020)
