= Plan A (Paulo Londra song) =

2022 single by Paulo Londra

Single by Paulo Londra

from the album Back to the Game
- Language: Spanish
- Released: 23 March 2022
- Genre: Punk rock
- Length: 2:58
- Label: Warner Latina
- Songwriters: Paulo Londra; Federico Vindver; Federico Colazo; Matías Rapacioli
- Producers: Federico Vindver; Hot Plug

Paulo Londra singles chronology
"Party" (2019)	"Plan A" (2022)	"Chance" (2022)

Music video
- "Plan A" on YouTube

"Plan A" is a song by Argentine rapper and singer Paulo Londra. The song was released by Warner Music Latina on 23 March 2022 as the lead single from Londra's second studio album, Back to the Game (2022). The song was written by Londra alongside its producers Federico Colazo and Matías Rapacioli (the producer-duo known as Hot Plug) and Federico Vindver.

"Plan A" has been called a punk-rock heartbreak song that narrates the end of a relationship. The song debuted at number one on the Billboard Argentina Hot 100 with less than two tracking days, becoming Londra's third number-one single on the chart following "Cuando Te Besé and "Adán y Eva" in 2018.

== Background ==
For two and a half years, Londra was unable to continue releasing songs due to a legal conflict between him and music producers Cristian Salazar (Kristo) and Daniel Oviedo (Ovy on the Drums), and the Big Ligas label, whom he accused of manipulating his contract and con him out of keeping the rights to his songs until 2025. After two years of trial, on November 10, 2021, he finally managed to dissociate himself on good terms from Big Leagues, the producer, in a hearing held in Miami, according to a report released by Billboard.

== Composition and lyrics ==
"Plan A" begins playing on a piano base that seems to anticipate a register close to a breakup ballad while Londra sings about wanting to obtain clarity in a relationship. Then, from the seventeenth second on, a dramatic drum beat kicks in and the chorus gets a boost from amplified guitars, adding some intensity to the track and establishing a different sound for Londra, who was heavily embedded in the latin trap scene from Argentina. Subsequently, before the minute, the rock insinuation ends up being exhibited as a personal reinterpretation of the punk-rock-pop typical of the early 21st century.

Regarding the lyrics, Londra commented: "I really wanted to do something new for myself and I really like rock and punk; I imagined a frustrated love".

== Critical reception ==
Overall, "Plan A" has had mixed reviews. Jordi Bardají from Jenesaispop, in his evaluation highlighted the surprise of their punk rock sound, although he said that "it cannot be overlooked that Londra is far from being the most convincing vocalist on this record". Similarly, Juan Manuel Pairone, from the Argentine newspaper La Voz del Interior, praised the innovative proposal of returning with a new genre different from his previous songs, however, he added that: "that punk pop imprint impregnated with adolescent spirit with which he reappeared in scene does not bring anything innovative to current music: on the contrary, it seems like a "copy and paste" of a sound that seemed to have already been rid of when bands like Blink-182 or Sum 41 went out of style".

== Commercial performance ==
Upon its release, the song became a commercial success. In its first twenty-four hours, the song debuted at number two on Spotify Global, becoming the first song to rank at number two by an Argentine artist without collaboration. In addition, his official YouTube video accumulated more than twenty-six million views and reached the top trending position in sixteen countries, including Argentina, Spain, and Mexico.

In Argentina, it became Londra's third number-one single on the Billboard Argentina Hot 100 chart, behind "Cuando Te Besé" and "Adán y Eva" (2018). It debuted in first position in the April 3, 2022 edition. It also debuted on the Monitor Latino airplay chart at number fourteen and, after a week, reached number one. In Spain, the song entered the thirty-third position on the PROMUSICAE list in week twelve of the list, and in seven days he ascended to the first. The song was his second number one, after "Adán y Eva".

== Music video ==
Like the single, the music video premiered on Vevo on March 23, 2022. Directed by Facundo Ballve, it was filmed on the basketball court of Club Atlético Lanús, located in the southern zone of Greater Buenos Aires (Argentina). In the best style of an American youth musical, the singer characterized a player who waits for the opportunity to go out onto the field. Until, finally, the coach ushers him in and he scores because he wants to “go first”, in reference to the lyrics of the song. During the video, at different times, he is also seen giving a show with the other members of his team "Leones con Flow", his group of friends, remaining faithful to his emblematic figure of the lion.

== Charts ==
=== Weekly charts ===
Weekly chart performance for "Plan A"
Chart (2022)	Peak position
Argentina (Argentina Hot 100)	1
Argentina Airplay (Monitor Latino)	1
Bolivia (Billboard)	1
Chile (Billboard)	4
Colombia (Billboard)	4
Colombia (Promúsica)	1
Costa Rica (FONOTICA)	1
Costa Rica (Monitor Latino)	10
Dominican Republic (SODINPRO)	30
Ecuador (Billboard)	1
Global 200 (Billboard)	8
Honduras (Monitor Latino)	17
Mexico (Billboard)	1
Mexico (Billboard Espanol Airplay)	25
Panama (Monitor Latino)	15
Panama (PRODUCE)	16
Paraguay (Monitor Latino)	13
Paraguay (SGP)	5
Peru (Billboard)	1
Peru Pop (Monitor Latino)	15
Spain (Billboard)	1
Spain (PROMUSICAE)	1
Uruguay (CUD)	1
Uruguay (Monitor Latino)	11
US Hot Latin Songs (Billboard)	43
US Hot Rock & Alternative Songs (Billboard)	46
Venezuela Pop (Monitor Latino)	18

=== Year-end charts ===
2022 year-end chart performance for "Plan A"
Chart (2022)	Position
Argentina (Monitor Latino)	26
Argentina Latin Airplay (Monitor Latino)	19
Bolivia (Monitor Latino)	17
Costa Rica (Monitor Latino)	35
Guatemala (Monitor Latino)	95
Panama (Monitor Latino)	98
Paraguay (Monitor Latino)	24
Uruguay (Monitor Latino)	44
Venezuela Pop (Monitor Latino)	38

== Certifications ==
Certifications for "Plan A"
Region	Certification	Certified units/sales
Spain (Promusicae)	Platinum	60,000^{‡}
United States (RIAA)	2× Platinum (Latin)	120,000^{‡}
Streaming
Chile (PROFOVI)	Gold	17,751,026
^{‡} Sales+streaming figures based on certification alone.
