= Back to the Game =

2022 album by Paulo Londra

Studio album by Paulo Londra
- Released: November 23, 2022
- Recorded: 2021–2022
- Genre: Pop rock; reggaeton; EDM; R&B; trap
- Length: 49:27
- Label: Warner Latina
- Producer: Federico Vindver; Timbaland; Hot Plug; Ángel "BabeTruth" López; Rio Root; Andrés Torres; Mauricio Rengifo; Jarom Su'a; Sky Rompiendo; Big One

Paulo Londra chronology
Homerun (2019)	Back to the Game (2022)

Singles from Homerun
- 1. "Plan A" Released: March 23, 2022; 2. "Chance" Released: April 6, 2022; 3. "Nublado" Released: June 29, 2022; 4. "Luces" Released: June 29, 2022; 5. "Cansado" Released: July 28, 2022; 6. "Julieta" Released: August 4, 2022; 7. "Noche de Novela" Released: August 11, 2022; 8. "Party en el Barrio" Released: September 14, 2022; 9. "A Veces" Released: November 3, 2022; 10. "Necio" Released: November 23, 2022

Back to the Game is the second studio album by Argentine rapper and singer Paulo Londra, released by Warner Music Latina on November 23, 2022. Londra co-wrote the album with his record producer and frequent collaborator Federico Vindver, who also produced the album and played every instrument.

Musically, the album explores various genres ranging from rap and trap to pop punk and reggaeton. Back to the Game was described as a work that "brings a renewed breath to Londra's music through a closer exploration of pop punk" and it is a project that "embodies a narrative of his pause in music". Upon release, the album received positive reviews from music critics, who praised its stylistic, varierity of sounds, rhymes, and lyrics. At the 25th Annual Gardel Awards, the album received a nomination for Best Urban Music Album.

Ten singles were released in promotion of the album: "Plan A", "Chance", "Nublado", "Luces", "Cansado", "Julieta", "Noche de Novela", "Party en el Barrio", "A Veces" and "Necio"; the first and lead single topped the major charts in Latin American, including the number one on the Billboard Argentina Hot 100.

== Background ==
After his legal conflict with his former record label Big Ligas in 2020, and the coincidence of the COVID-19 pandemic that prevented him from releasing music for two years, Londra resumed his career with Warner. On March 23, 2022, he released his first song "Plan A" after winning the lawsuit. As part of the release of his first single, Paulo hinted at the title of his second album by gifting a pendant with the inscription Back to the Game to several professional players of the Argentina national football team.

On November 2, 2022, Londra revealed in an interview with Telenoche that he already had "his next album ready". In that same interview, he revealed that the name of the album would be Back to the Game and that he would release six more songs in addition to the ones he had already published. Shortly after, Londra announced through his social media channels that the album would be released on November 23, 2022. Three days before the release, Paulo unveiled the album cover and aesthetic through his official Instagram account, as well as the list of songs that would be part of it.

== Music and lyrics ==
The standard edition of the album contains sixteen tracks. The opening track "Chango" is a pure rap song that describes the conflicts the artist had to go through and his strong desire to return to the music industry. "Plan A" is a rock pop song that deals with romantic frustration. The third track, "Party en el Barrio", is a Latin trap song with Duki, which tells the story of two friends who emerged from the streets and conquer the music scene. "Luces" is an electronic dance music track. The fifth song, "Por deporte," is accompanied by a powerful reggaeton beat and tells the story of being attracted to a girl who enjoys partying. "Noche de Novela" is a pop R&B song with English singer Ed Sheeran. "Nublado" was described as an infectious and refreshing punk rock track, with American musician Travis Barker on drums.

The eighth song, "A Veces," features a collaboration with Colombian singer Feid and is a classic reggaeton track with a strong rhythm and a blend of percussion elements. "Cansado," performed with Joaqo, a close friend of Londra, is a song that complements trap and hip hop. The tenth track, "Tenso" is a heartbreak song where Paulo ventures into cumbia. "Ella" is a soft romantic pop ballad that includes a dembow-like tapping that guides the rhythm of the song. As for the track "Julieta", it is a "hypnotic" romantic reggaeton inspired by William Shakespeare's literary work Romeo and Juliet (1597).

In the pop ballad "Ojalá", Londra talks about overcoming a love and taking separate paths. "Necio", a collaboration with Lit Killah, is an urban music track that harks back to his first album Homerun (2019) and draws on trap foundations, addressing themes such as "imbalances in a romantic relationship". The ballad "Chance" is the fifteenth track, combining elements of trap and narrating a "love-at-first-sight story". The album concludes with "Toc Toc", a freestyle produced by American rapper Timbaland.

== Release and promotion ==
Back to the Game was released on November 23, 2022. Along with it, the music videos for "Necio" with Lit Killah, "Por deporte", "Chango", and "Ella" were also premiered on YouTube.

As part of the album's release, Londra gave a free concert at Parque Las Tejas in his hometown, which was attended by approximately 50,000 people. He performed several songs from the album, including "Plan A", "Luces", "A veces", and "Cansado" with Joaqo. He also debuted two unreleased tracks from the album: "Chango" and "Necio" with Lit Killah. On November 29, 2022, Londra released the official music video for "Ojalá". On December 6, Paulo premiered the official music video for the song "Tenso".

== Critical reception ==
Back to the Game received positive reviews from music critics. Thania Garcia of Variety highlighted that throughout his songs, Londra skillfully navigates between sounds and styles like reggaeton. Darío Porto Toledano from the website Urbano News praised the album, stating that Paulo achieved a great job by offering "highly varied collaborations with internationally renowned artists". In a review for La Nación, Sebastián Chaves gave a mixed critique of the album, stating that only in "Luces" does Londra unleash his best flow without deviating from the tempo and embracing the mood of the song. However, Chaves wrote that in some of the songs, the lyrics don't hit hard and that Londra has an impressive selection of guests but lacks the power to generate an impact.

Billboard named Back to the Game as one of the "Best Latin Albums of 2022" because Londra made a triumphant comeback by offering his characteristic freestyle essence while boldly delving into reggaeton. Radio station Estación K2 named Paulo's work as one of the "top 25 albums of 2022" for being one of the most highly anticipated albums in the music industry, as Londra made a grand return with an album that surpassed expectations.

== Commercial performance ==
Back to the Game, in its first week of release, managed to reach the Spotify charts as the third most streamed studio album in the United States and the ninth in the United Kingdom, making Londra the first Argentine artist to achieve these milestones. According to Spotify, in the global ranking of debut albums for the week, the album reached the number 2 position.

== Accolades ==
List of awards and nominations received by Back to the Game
Year	Award	Category	Result	Ref.
2023	Gardel Awards	Best Urban Music Album	Nominated	

== Track listing ==
Back to the Game track listing
No.	Title	Writer(s)	Producer(s)	Length
1.	"Chango"	Paulo Ezequiel Londra; Federico Vindver	Vindver; Timbaland	2:34
2.	"Plan A"	Londra; Vindver; Federico Javier Colazo; Matías Andrés Rapacioli	Vindver; Hot Plug	2:58
3.	"Party en el Barrio" (with Duki)	Londra; Vindver; José Velázquez; Mauro Ezequiel Lombardo; Rio Root	Ángel "BabeTruth" López; Vindver; Root	3:56
4.	"Luces"	Londra; Vindver; Colazo; Rapacioli	Vindver; Hot Plug	2:52
5.	"Por Deporte"	Londra; Andrés Torres; Vindver; Mauricio Rengifo	Torres; Vindver; Rengifo	2:49
6.	"Noche de Novela" (with Ed Sheeran)	Londra; Edward Christopher Sheeran; Vindver	Vindver	3:11
7.	"Nublado" (with Travis Barker)	Londra; Vindver; Velázquez; Travis Landon Barker	López; Vindver	2:57
8.	"A Veces" (with Feid)	Londra; Vindver; Salomón Villada Hoyos	Vindver	3:11
9.	"Cansado" (with Joaqo)	Londra; Vindver; Colazo; Jarom Su'a; Joaquín Domínguez	Vindver; Hot Plug; Su'a	3:01
10.	"Tenso"	Londra; Vindver	Vindver	2:50
11.	"Ella"	Londra; Alejandro Ramírez Suárez	Sky Rompiendo	3:33
12.	"Julieta"	Londra; Vindver; Ramírez Suárez	Vindver; Sky Rompiendo	3:04
13.	"Ojalá"	Londra; Vindver; Su'a; Root	Vindver; Su'a; Root	2:45
14.	"Necio" (with Lit Killah)	Londra; Daniel Ismael Real; Mauro Román Monzón	Big One	3:38
15.	"Chance"	Londra; Vindver	Vindver	3:24
16.	"Toc Toc" (with Timbaland)	Londra; Vindver; Timothy Zachery Mosley	Timbaland; Vindver	2:37
Total length:				49:27

== Certifications ==
Certifications for Back to the Game
Region	Certification	Certified units/sales
United States (RIAA)	Gold (Latin)	30,000^{‡}
^{‡} Sales+streaming figures based on certification alone.

== Release history ==
Release formats for Back to the Game
Region	Date	Format(s)	Label	Ref.
Various	23 November 2022	Digital download; streaming	Warner Latina	
