= Power of Soul (band) =

Argentine soul band

- Origin: Buenos Aires, Argentina
- Genres: Soul, funk
- Years active: 2006–present
- Members: Titi Lapolla; Osko; Andy Ramos; Mariano; Anibal Alo
- Past members: Mariano Vanrafelghem; Guido Duran; Martín Carrizo; Olgo; Natasha Iurcovich
- Website: www.powerofsoul1.com

Power of Soul is a soul/funk band from Argentina.

In 2006, after A.N.I.M.A.L. disbanded, Titi Lapolla (then A.N.I.M.A.L.'s bassist and background vocalist) kept on composing material, which later became the material in Power of Soul. It was by chance that the songs were recorded, as Titi's friend (and producer) Sebastián Subirana listened to the songs and proposed him to record them. By the end of the year, this album was already in the market, and albeit being completely independent, it is also available in important music retail chains as Musimundo and Yenny.

Their only album to date was recorded almost exclusively by Titi Lapolla, with guitar solos on six songs by Mariano "El Conde" Vanrafelghem, who later became the official electric guitarist of the band. Martín Carrizo (former A.N.I.M.A.L. drummer) provided sequencing on one track as well as drumming for the band on its early days, to later become the official drummer. All songs on the first album are in the English language. This project marks a departure for Titi, as he left behind his traditional bass and backing vocals position in other bands (A.N.I.M.A.L. and Saibo) to become guitarist, singer and leader of his new project.

From December 2006 to February 2007 Power of Soul embarked on a successful tour of Brazil, playing in cities like Rio de Janeiro and Armação dos Búzios and sharing the stage with Donavon Frankenreiter.

The original formation of Power of Soul was Titi Lapolla on acoustic guitar and vocals, Mariano "El Conde" Vanrafelghem on electric guitar, Guido Duran on bass and Martín Carrizo on drums and percussion. In early 2009, the line up changed, now having Osko on drums, Andy Ramos on electric guitar, Natasha on bass and Olgo on percussions. Both Guido and El Conde left in May and June respectively to focus on their own projects.

The band is finishing recording the material that will comprise the next album, featuring many songs in Spanish. Some song titles include Lies, Groove, Vagabundo (Hobo), Tan Fugaz Como La Eternidad (As Fast As Eternity) and Surf.

== Discography ==
=== Power of Soul ===
- Released August 15, 2006
1. "When The Sun Goes Down"
2. "Making Love"
3. "Power of Soul"
4. "It's Time For Me"
5. "So Hard"
6. "My Plan"
7. "Camila"
8. "Look At Me"
9. "Life Goes On" (Acoustic)
10. "It's Time For Me" (Acoustic)

== Videography ==
- When The Sun Goes Down (2008)
