= A.N.I.M.A.L. =

Argentine metal band

- Also known as: "Animal", "Acosados Nuestros Indios Murieron Al Luchar"
- Origin: Buenos Aires, Argentina
- Genres: Groove metal; thrash metal; nu metal
- Years active: 1991–2006; 2015–present
- Label: Universal
- Members: Andrés Giménez; Cristian "Titi" Lapolla; Marcelo Castro
- Past members: Marcelo "Corvata" Corvalán; Claudio Cardacci; Aníbal Alo; Martín Carrizo; Andrés Vilanova
- Website: www.animal.com.ar

A.N.I.M.A.L. (Acosados Nuestros Indios Murieron Al Luchar; meaning "Harassed, Our Indians Died While Fighting") is a heavy metal band from Buenos Aires, Argentina. The band's sound is a combination of thrash metal, groove metal and nu metal, and most lyrics deal with issues of ethnic minorities and indigenous people of Latin America; evident in song titles such as Sólo Por Ser Indios ("Only For Being Indian"), Guerra De Razas ("Race War"), Poder Latino ("Latin Power") and Raza Castigada ("Punished Race").

The band experienced commercial success in the mid-to-late 1990s and toured throughout a number of Latin American countries, the United States and Europe, and also opened for numerous big names from the worldwide rock and metal scene such as Pantera, Biohazard, Bad Religion, Ratos de Porão, Suicidal Tendencies, Sepultura, Soulfly, Megadeth and Slipknot.

== History ==
The band's logo

=== Formation and early years (1991–1995) ===
The band started as Animal with the line-up of Andrés Gimenez (ex-Beso Negro - vocals and guitar), Roberto "el Polaco" Zelasek (ex-Los Violadores- bass) and Anibal Alo (drums), but after Zelasek left the band, they had to change the name to A.N.I.M.A.L for legal reasons (Animal was registered under Zelasek's name, he recorded under this name, but never released any official record). In 1991 Gimenez recruited Marcelo "Corvata" Corvalán as their new bassist and then recorded their self-titled debut album, which (unlike later releases) had a more classic heavy metal oriented sound with some mild grunge influences. During that period of time, the band opened for Biohazard and Bad Religion in the Obras Sanitarias arena in Buenos Aires, and then Pantera at the same venue.

By that same year, drummer Anibal Alo left the band to be briefly replaced by Javier Dorado, who quickly left to form Mate Cosido (alongside Gimenez' ex-Beso Negro's partner Lito Pared), then in 1994, Martín Carrizo entered the band and recorded Fin De Un Mundo Enfermo, which represented a drastic change in their sound to a more groove and thrash oriented sound influenced by the likes of Pantera, Prong, Sepultura and Biohazard. That album was the beginning of their rise to fame, as they sold out Cemento, (a defunct rock concert hall in Buenos Aires, Argentina), numerous times and opened for Suicidal Tendencies and, once again, Pantera.

=== Mainstream success (1996–2000) ===
In 1996, the band flew to Los Angeles and recorded El Nuevo Camino Del Hombre, an album with a heavier yet more melodic sound, a little less thrash oriented and fully embracing their groove metal influences with the incorporation of drop C tuning, a five string bass, clean vocal choruses and even a rap metal track called "Chalito", serving also as a bridge between their previous more generation X oriented sound and the more millennial oriented sound they would embrace in later releases. With this album, the band headlined a show in Obras Sanitarias for the first and only time, and they also opened for Sepultura in the middle of their Roots tour at the same venue.

By 1997, Martín Carrizo left the band while he was under contract for their new album recordings, so while they recruited Andrés "El Niño" Vilanova as their new drummer and went on to the Indigo Ranch andy hired Jimmy DeGrasso as a guest drummer to record Poder Latino which was produced by Max Cavalera and is considered by a lot of fans to be their best release and the band's big break. Once again their sound changed, this time their influences were much closer to the likes of Korn, Coal Chamber, Soulfly and the rising nu metal scene, with bouncing riffs, rap verses, melodic choruses and the drop A tuning. The album included lot of guest musicians such as Metallica's Robert Trujillo, Fear Factory's Christian Olde Wolbers and Argentinian folk musicians Leon Gieco and Chango Farias Gomez. It also includes 3 covers at the later part of the album: "Cop Killer" (originally by Body Count), "Fuerza Para Aguantar" ("Strength To Endure" by The Ramones) and "Cinco Siglos Igual" (Leon Gieco).

During that period of time, the band toured all over Latin America and made their two biggest shows to date as headliners at Buenos Aires Vivo in front of 35,000 people, at the Velodromo of Buenos Aires in front of 15,000 people and then closed that year at Parque Sarmiento in front of 7,000 people.

In 1999 the band returned to Indigo Ranch in Los Angeles to record Usa Toda Tu Fuerza, which was produced by Richard Kaplan and Chuck Johnson, and dug deeper into the band's newfound nu metal influences. The album included a Spanglish version of AC/DC's Highway to Hell featuring Lemmy Kilmister from Motörhead. In 2000 the band toured in the United States as a part of the Warped Tour festival, alongside the likes of Green Day, No Doubt, NOFX, Papa Roach, Millencolin and many more. They also toured in Europe and then returned to Argentina to make a national tour selling out every venue.

=== Final years and hiatus (2000–2006) ===
In late 2000, longtime bassist Corvalán and Vilanova left the band (and then went on to form Carajo), but months later bassist Cristian "Titi" Lapolla (ex-Raptor and Simbiosis) and drummer Marcelo Castro (ex-Ritual) joined the band and went on to record Animal 6 which is remembered as the band's heaviest and most brutal release to date, as it combined the updated sound of their two previous albums with more extreme influences and a slight return to their classic groove metal sound.

Since then the band experienced several line-up changes that included Cristian Lapolla leaving in 2002 and being briefly replaced by Hernan Cotelo (ex-Mate Cosido and V1R7u4L) and then coming back later that yeat, Marcelo Castro leaving in 2003 to be briefly replaced by Javier Dorado (ex-Mate Cosido and O'Connor) and then a returning Martín Carrizo (after Pr3ssion's breakup). Then in late 2003, the band entered to record their final album called Combativo, which came out in 2004 fully embracing the nu metal sound once again. In 2005, they opened for Slipknot on 29 and 30 September at Obras Sanitarias, and then, on 9 October, headlined the indoors stage at Pepsi Music 2005 (headlined by Megadeth at the outdoors stage) to a sold-out crowd.

In 2006, it was announced that the band would take an indefinite break; this resulted in Martín Carrizo (drummer) leaving the band and Andrés Giménez forming a new band called "D-mente" (word play meaning both demente ("lunatic") and devil mente ("devil mind", or "weak mind"—although weak in Spanish is débil not devil—Andrés' nickname). Titi Lapolla and Martín Carrizo are part of Power of Soul.

=== Return (2015–present) ===
In March 2015, it was announced that the band would return with the line-up that recorded their 2001 album Animal 6, and they did two shows on 29 and 31 March at the Vorterix theater, in Buenos Aires, to a sold out crowd. On 6 March 2016, the band recorded their first live DVD set to be released soon along with an audio CD that features said concert and 6 new songs.

== Members ==
Current

- Andrés Giménez – lead vocals, guitar (1991–2006, 2015–present)
- Cristian "Titi" Lapolla – bass (2001–2006, 2015–present)
- Marcelo Castro – drums (2001–2002, 2015–present)

Past

- Marcelo "Corvata" Corvalán – bass (1991–2000)
- Claudio Cardacci – drums (1991)
- Aníbal Alo – drums (1992–1994)
- Martín Carrizo – drums (1994–1997, 2003–2006; died 2022)
- Andrés Vilanova – drums (1998–2000)

Live

- Javier Dorado – drums (1994, 2002–2003)
- Hernan Cotelo – bass (2002)

Timeline

== Discography ==
=== Studio albums ===
- A.N.I.M.A.L. (1993)
- Fin De Un Mundo Enfermo (End of a Sick World) (1994)
- El Nuevo Camino Del Hombre (The New Path of Man) (1996)
- Poder Latino (Latin Power) (1998)
- Usa Toda Tu Fuerza (Use All Your Strength) (1999)
- Animal 6 (2001)
- Combativo (Combative) (2004)
- Una Razón Para Seguir (A Reason to Continue) (2018)
- Legado (Legacy) (2025)
