= Federico Vindver =

Argentine record producer and songwriter (born 1982)

Background information
- Born: Luis Federico Vindver; 18 August 1982 (age 44); Buenos Aires, Argentina
- Genres: Pop; hip-hop; rock; Latin
- Occupations: Record producer; songwriter; multi-instrumentalist

Luis Federico Vindver (born 18 August 1982) is an Argentine record producer, songwriter, and multi-instrumentalist based in Los Angeles, California.

Vindver has produced along with Timbaland and worked with artists such as Justin Timberlake, Kanye West, Coldplay, Yung Tory, Beto Cuevas, Tee Grizzley, Nathy Peluso, Meghan Trainor, Pablo Alborán, Brockhampton, Ludacris, the Blossom, New City and Wisin among others.

He has worked on records that have earned him Grammy and Latin Grammy Awards (including the Latin Grammy Award for Producer of the Year), and he was named Top 5 producer and writer by Billboard.

== Early life ==
Vindver was born in Buenos Aires, Argentina. As a young man, he left the country during its financial crisis in 2002, visiting Spain and Mexico before receiving a full piano scholarship to the Frost School of Music at the University of Miami in Florida. While he studied jazz at college, he learned other musical genres elsewhere. He was playing in a practice room at UM when he was approached and asked if he would play in a local African-American church. There he learned about gospel, R&B and soul. He then became interested in technology and production.

"I was living in a practically destitute situation, because my parents couldn't help me financially and even though I had the full scholarship, I lived in a place where I didn't even have a bed," Vindver said. "At that time, an Argentine friend who lived in Miami gave me a computer that he didn't use, and there I downloaded cracked software to make music, and I started putting together the backing tracks for these gospel groups. As I did that, I started to like that a lot and I started to get more interested in producing, at first with the bands I played in."

== Music career ==
In 2008, while still in college, he briefly became keyboardist and show producer for Lauryn Hill.

After graduation in 2008, Vindver met Ricky Martin's musical director who connected him with Franco De Vita, and he worked with him as arranger and keyboardist. Then he co-wrote the song "Basta Ya" for Martin's Música + Alma + Sexo album, and toured to support it. Vindver continued to tour, playing keyboards with Latin artists Jennifer Lopez and Marc Anthony, then joined his wife to live in Los Angeles, California. At that time, he decided to focus full-time on production. In 2017, through manager/music executive Gary Marella, Vindver met Timbaland and both started working together. They made tracks for rock band Muse, pop vocalist Noah Cyrus, R&B singer Zayn.

In December 2018, Vindver and Timbaland were producing rap artist Saweetie and Lil Mosey, when Kanye West came to the studio. The next summer Vindver and West met again, and bonded over their mutual Christian faith. His early experience playing gospel in Miami churches appealed to West, and they decided to work together on the latter's next album, Jesus Is King.

In October 2019, Kanye West released Jesus Is King, which featured 10 out of 11 songs produced by Vindver. Those 10 songs charted on the Billboard Hot 100. A month after the release of Jesus Is King, four songs he co-wrote and produced appeared on the Coldplay album, Everyday Life. West's album debuted at No. 1 on the Billboard 200 album chart in the United States, while the Coldplay album entered the UK Album Chart at No. 1. Of the songs Vindver wrote on Everyday Life, two were released as singles and charted: "Orphans" went to No. 1 on Billboard's Rock Airplay chart, while "Everyday Life" hit No. 14 on the Billboard Hot Rock & Alternative Songs chart.

In the following years, Vindver wrote and produced for Pharrell Williams, Chance the Rapper, Armin Van Buuren, Tee Grizzley, ASAP Ferg, Brockhampton, Missy Elliott, Ant Clemons, among others.

In 2020, Vindver released an online platform for producers called BeatClub, that permits them to sell their music online and network with other producers and artists.

Vindver continued working with Timbaland, and that year the two producers joined Shucati, Rance, Angel Lόpez, and Sucuki, in working with Chance the Rapper on his track, "Found You", featuring Ludacris.

In November 2020, Josh Groban's album, Harmony, was produced by Bernie Herms, but Vindver produced an additional song for the project—"The Fullest (Feat. Kirk Franklin)."

In 2021, Vindver co-wrote the single, "Higher Power" for Coldplay. The song was produced by Max Martin. Also that year, he wrote and produced "We're In This Together" for Justin Bieber's Freedom EP. '

Throughout his career, Vindver maintained a foothold in the Latin community, producing and writing for artists Ricky Martin ("Basta Ya"), Pablo Alborán ("Hablemos de amor"), C. Tangana ("Te Olvidaste feat. Omar Apollo"), Lali ("Fascinada", "Laligera"), Yendry ("Ya"), and many more.

== Awards ==
Award	Year	Recipient(s) and nominee(s)	Category	Result	Ref.
Grammy Awards	2021	Jesus Is King	Best Contemporary Christian Music Album	Won	
Grammy Awards	2022	Donda	Album of the Year	Nominated	
Grammy Awards	2023	Music of the Spheres	Album of the Year	Nominated	
Grammy Awards	2026	Papote	Best Latin Rock or Alternative Album	Won	
Latin Grammy Awards	2021	"Te Olvidaste"	Record of the Year	Nominated	
Latin Grammy Awards	2021	"Te Olvidaste"	Best Alternative Song	Nominated	
Latin Grammy Awards	2021	"Sana Sana"	Best Rap/Hip Hop Song	Nominated	
Latin Grammy Awards	2021	El Madrileño	Best Engineered Album	Won	
Latin Grammy Awards	2022	Tinta y Tiempo	Album of the Year	Nominated	
Latin Grammy Awards	2022	Aguilera	Album of the Year	Nominated	
Latin Grammy Awards	2022	Aguilera	Best Traditional Pop Album	Won	
Latin Grammy Awards	2022	"Pa' Mis Muchachas"	Record of the Year	Nominated	
Latin Grammy Awards	2022	"El Día Que Estrenaste el Mundo"	Best Alternative Song	Won	
Latin Grammy Awards	2022	"Cuando Me Dé la Gana"	Best Regional Mexican Song	Nominated	
Latin Grammy Awards	2023	"No Es Que Te Extrañe"	Record of the Year	Nominated	
Latin Grammy Awards	2024	"Derrumbe"	Record of the Year	Nominated	
Latin Grammy Awards	2025	Papote	Album of the Year	Nominated	
Latin Grammy Awards	2025	Papote	Best Alternative Music Album	Won	
Latin Grammy Awards	2025	"#Tetas"	Record of the Year	Nominated	
Latin Grammy Awards	2025	"#Tetas"	Song of the Year	Nominated	
Latin Grammy Awards	2025	"#Tetas"	Best Alternative Song	Won	
Latin Grammy Awards	2025	"El Día Del Amigo"	Record of the Year	Nominated	
Latin Grammy Awards	2025	"El Día Del Amigo"	Song of the Year	Nominated	
Latin Grammy Awards	2025	"El Día Del Amigo"	Best Pop Song	Won	
Latin Grammy Awards	2025	—N/a	Producer of the Year	Won	
Latin Grammy Awards	2026	Free Spirits	Album of the Year	Pending	
Latin Grammy Awards	2026	"Ha Ha"	Record of the Year	Pending	
Latin Grammy Awards	2026	"Hasta Jesús Tuvo un Mal Día"	Song of the Year	Pending	
Latin Grammy Awards	2026	"Hasta Jesús Tuvo un Mal Día"	Best Pop/Rock Song	Pending	
Latin Grammy Awards	2026	—N/a	Producer of the Year	Pending	

== Discography ==
Year	Artist	Album	Single	Label	Credit
2011	Ricky Martin	Más Música + Alma + Sexo	"Basta Ya"	Sony Latin	Writer
2013	Wisin	El Regreso del Sobreviviente	"Adrenalina" (featuring Jennifer Lopez and Ricky Martin)	Sony Latin	Producer
2014	Sensato	On The Rise	"Que Lo Que"	Mr. 305 Records	Writer
2015	Wisin	Los Vaqueros La Trilogia	"Que Se Siente El Deseo"	Sony Latin	Producer
2015	Pitbull	Dale	"Que Lo Que" (Sensato featuring Pitbull, Papayo and El Chevo)	Mr. 305 Records	Producer
2016	Brian Cross	Darkness to Light	"Faces & Lighters"	Sony España	Producer
2016	Tyron Hapi	Your Fool	"Your Fool"	Hussie Recordings	Producer
2016	CNCO	Primera Cita	"Primera Cita"	Sony Latin	Producer
2017	Thomas Gold	Dreamer	"Dreamer"	Amada Music B.V.	Producer
2017	Alx Veliz	Higher	"Higher"	Universal Music Canada	Producer
2017	Vintage Trouble	Chapter II - EP II (Live)	"Knock Me Out"	McGee Entertainment	Writer, producer
2017	New City		"Dirty Secrets", "Coachella"	Universal Canada	Writer, producer
2018	Mariah Carey	Caution	"8th Grade"	Epic	Writer
2018	Muse	Simulation Theory	"Propaganda"	Warner Music UK	Writer, producer
2018	Natalia Oreiro	Mi Pobedim	"Mi Pobedim"	Warner Music Argentina	Writer, producer
2018	Noah Cyrus	Team	"Team" (A Timbaland Productions Remix)	Columbia	Producer
2018	Los Unidades / Pharrell Williams	E-Lo	"E-Lo" (featuring Jozzy)	Parlophone Records	Producer
2018	Bruno Martini	Youngr (Remixes)	"Youngr"	AfterCluv	Writer, producer
2018	Little Mix	LM5	"More Than Words"	Syco	Writer
2018	The Internet	Hive Mind	"Come Over" (Timbaland Remix)	Columbia	Producer
2019	Kanye West	Jesus Is King	"Every Hour," "Selah", "Closed on Sunday," "On God", "Everything We Need," "Water," "God Is", "Hands On," "Use This Gospel," "Jesus Is Lord"	GOOD Music/Def Jam	Writer, producer
2019	Coldplay	Everyday Life	"Orphans", "Everyday Life", "Champion of the World", "Church"	Parlophone UK	Producer
2019	Missy Elliott	Iconology	"Why I Still Love You"	Goldmind/Atlantic	Writer, producer
2019	Chance the Rapper	The Big Day	"Big Fish"	Independent	Producer
2019	Sharlene	Viaje	"Yo Pago Lo Mio"	UMG Latino	Writer, producer
2019	Mayra	Voices	"Monster"	AfterCluv	Writer
2019	Yung Tory	Still Here	"Lola", "Me & You", "Picture Me", "Said You Love Me"	Mosley Music Group/Def Jam	Writer, producer
2019	Carson Lueders	Lonely	"Lonely"	Mosley Music Group/Def Jam	Writer, producer
2019	Fitz and the Tantrums	All the Feels	"Ready Or Not"	Elektra	Producer
2019	Beto Cuevas	Colateral	"Rosas En El Lodo", "La Señal", "Por Donde Vas", "La Mitad"	Warner Music Mexico	Writer, producer
2019	For King & Country	Burn The Ships	"God Only Knows" (Timbaland Remix)	Curb/Word	Writer
2019	Tee Grizzley	Scriptures	"God's Warrior", "Sweet Things", "Million Dollar Foreign", "Locksmith", "Heroes", "More Than Friends", "Scriptures"	300 Entertainment	Writer, producer
2019	Dean Lewis	A Place We Knew	"Waves Remix'	Universal Australia	Producer
2019	Lali	Libra	"Laligera"	Sony	Writer, producer
2020	Josh Groban	Harmony	"The Fullest" (featuring Kirk Franklin)	Reprise Records	Producer
2020	Nathy Peluso	Calambre	"Sana Sana", "Trio", "Business Woman", "Delito"	Sony	Producer
2020	Saweetie	Back to the Streets	"Back to the Streets" (featuring Jhené Aiko)	Warner	Writer, producer
2020	Meghan Trainor	A Very Trainor Christmas	"The Christmas Song", "Sleigh Ride", "My Only Wish"	Epic Records	Producer
2020	Teyana Taylor	The Album	"Boomin"	Def Jam	Producer
2020	Don Diablo	Kill Me Better	"Kill Me Better"	Hexagon	Producer
2020	Ludacris (featuring Chance the Rapper)	Found You	"Found You"	DTP Records	Producer
2020	Pablo Alboran	Vertigo	"Hablemos de amor", "Corazon Descalzo", No esta en tus planes"	Warner Spain	Producer
2020	Teyana Taylor	The Album	"Boomin" (featuring Missy Elliott)	Def Jam	Writer, producer
2020	Lali	Libra	"Fascinada"	Sony	Writer, producer
2020	Ludacris	S.O.L.T. (Silence of the Lambs)	"S.O.T.L." (featuring Lil Wayne)	Disturbing Tha Peace Records	Producer
2020	ASAP Ferg	Floor Seats	"Hummer Limo"	RCA Records	Writer producer
2021	Trippie Redd	Pegasus	"Leaders"	1400	Writer, producer
2021	C. Tangana	El Madrileno	"Te Olvidaste" (featuring Omar Pello)	Sony	Writer, producer
2021	Brockhampton	Roadrunner: New Light New Machine	"The Light Pt. II", "I'll Take You On" (featuring Charlie Wilson)	Sony	Writer, producer
2021	The Blossom	97 Blossom	"Hardcore Happy" "Black Eye"	Video Store	Writer, producer
2021	Coldplay		"Higher Power"	Parlophone	Producer
2021	Justin Bieber	Freedom EP	"We're in This Together"	Def Jam	Producer
2021	Yendry		"Ya"	RCA/Sony Latin	Producer, writer
2021	Alicia Keys		"Underdog Remix" (featuring Nicky Jam, Rauw Alejandro)	Sony	Producer
2022	Paulo Londra	Back to the Game	"Noche de Novela"	Warner Music Latina/Asylum Records	Producer
2023	Lauv		Love U Like That	Universal Music Group	Writer, Producer
2024	Justin Timberlake	Everything I Thought It Was	"Fuckin' Up the Disco", "No Angels", "Technicolor", "Infinity Sex", "Love & War", "What Lovers Do", "Paradise"	RCA Records	Writer, Co-producer
2025	Maroon 5	Love Is Like	"All Night", "Priceless", "California"	222 Records, Interscope Records	Producer, Writer, Engineer, Keyboards
2025	Le Sserafim		"Spaghetti" (featuring J-Hope of BTS)	Source Music, Geffen Records	Producer, Writer
2026	K/DA		"WATCH ME", with Sophie Powers, Mimi Webb	Riot Games	Producer
