= Sociedad de Gestión de Productores Fonográficos del Paraguay =

Paraguayan non-profit organization

- Abbreviation: SGP
- Formation: 20 March 2002; 24 years ago
- Type: NGO
- Headquarters: 2221 Avenida España, Asunción, Paraguay
- Location: Paraguay
- Official language: Spanish
- Affiliations: IFPI
- Website: sgp.com.py

The Sociedad de Gestión de Productores Fonográficos del Paraguay (SGP) (English: Society of Management of Phonographic Producers of Paraguay) is a Paraguayan non-profit organization that represents phonographic producers and performers throughout the country. SGP provides monthly top 100 and 50 music charts for Paraguay.

The SGP is an associated member of the International Federation of the Phonographic Industry and also serves as the national ISRC agency.

== Charts ==
The SGP publishes four lists of the most played songs and artists on selected radio stations, for information purposes for the general public visiting their website. The website provides the following charts;

- Top 100 Canciones generales
- Top 100 Artistas generales
- Top 50 de Música Nacional
- Top 50 de Artistas Nacionales

== Music recording certification ==
SGP is the organization awarding music recording certifications in Paraguay. Originally, only albums were certified, with certification levels of 5,000 for Gold album and 10,000 for Platinum for both domestic and international artist. Those numbers have lasted at least until June 2013.

== See also ==
- Monitor Latino
