= Paulo Londra discography =

- Studio albums: 2
- Singles: 20
- Mixtapes: 1

Argentine rapper and singer Paulo Londra has released two studio albums, one mixtape and 20 singles (including two as a featured artist). He gained popularity in 2018 with the singles "Cuando Te Besé" and "Adán y Eva", both which topped the Billboard Argentina Hot 100. In May 2019, Londra released his debut studio album, Homerun, which peaked at number 12 on the Billboard Top Latin Albums chart. In July, Londra appeared as a featured artist on Ed Sheeran's track "Nothing on You" from the album No.6 Collaborations Project.

== Albums ==
=== Studio albums ===
List of studio albums, with selected details, chart positions, sales, and certifications
Title	Details	Peaks				Sales	Certifications
Title	Details	ARG	MEX	SPA	US Latin	Sales	Certifications
Homerun	Released: 23 May 2019; Label: Big Ligas, Warner Music Latina; Format: CD, digital download, streaming	1	4	3	12	US: 185,000	CAPIF: 2× Diamond; PROMUSICAE: Gold; RIAA: 4× Platinum (Latin)
Back to the Game	Released: 23 November 2022; Label: Warner Music Latina; Format: digital download, streaming	—	—	—	—		RIAA: Gold (Latin)

=== Mixtapes ===
Title	Details
Dímelo	Release: 4 June 2018; Record label: Big Ligas; Formats: Digital download, streaming

== Singles ==
=== As lead artist ===
List of singles as lead artist, with selected chart positions and certifications, showing year released and album name
Title	Year	Peak chart positions										Certifications	Album
Title	Year	ARG	COL	ECU	ITA	MEX	PAR	SPA	SWI	URU	US Latin	Certifications	Album
"Relax"	2017	—	—	—	—	—	—	—	—	—	—		Dímelo
"Confiado y Tranquilo"	2017	—	—	—	—	—	—	—	—	—	—		Dímelo
"Me Tiene Mal"	2017	—	—	—	—	—	—	—	—	—	—		Dímelo
"Luna Llena"	2017	—	—	—	—	—	—	—	—	—	—		Dímelo
"Está Bien" (featuring Frijo)	2017	—	—	—	—	—	—	—	—	—	—		Dímelo
"Por Lo Mío"	2017	—	—	—	—	—	—	—	—	—	—		Dímelo
"Cámara Lenta"	2017	—	—	—	—	—	— (Note: "Cámara Lenta" did not enter the Monitor Latino Top 20 Paraguay airplay chart, but peaked at number 13 on the Paraguay Urban Airplay chart.)	—	—	—	—		Dímelo
"Condenado Para el Millón"	2017	—	—	—	—	—	—	—	—	—	—	CAPIF: Platinum	Homerun
"Nena Maldición" (featuring Lenny Tavarez)	2018	7	—	—	—	— (Note: "Nena Maldición" did not enter the Billboard Mexico Airplay chart, but peaked at number 40 on the Mexico Espanol Airplay chart.)	32	—	—	—	—	CAPIF: 2× Platinum; PROMUSICAE: 2× Platinum; RIAA: 3× Platinum (Latin)	Homerun
"Te Amo" (with Piso 21)	2018	8	7	17	—	25	2	46	—	61	—	CAPIF: Platinum; ASINCOL: Platinum; PROMUSICAE: Platinum	Ubuntu
"Dímelo"	2018	5	—	—	—	—	9	—	—	—	—	CAPIF: Platinum	Homerun
"Chica Paranormal"	2018	5	—	—	—	—	—	99	—	—	—	CAPIF: Platinum; PROMUSICAE: Platinum	Homerun
"Cuando Te Besé" (with Becky G)	2018	1	20	11	—	— (Note: "Cuando Te Besé" did not enter the Billboard Mexico Airplay chart, but peaked at number 34 on the Mexico Espanol Airplay chart.)	4	10	—	5	30	CAPIF: Gold; AMPROFON: Diamond+Platinum; PMB: Gold; PROMUSICAE: 3× Platinum; RIAA: 2× Platinum (Latin)	Mala Santa
"Adán y Eva"	2018	1	7	1	18	33	2	1	47	1	25	CAPIF: 2× Platinum; ASINCOL: Platinum; AMPROFON: 3× Platinum; FIMI: 2× Platinum; PROMUSICAE: 5× Platinum; RIAA: 7× Platinum (Latin)	Homerun
"Forever Alone"	2019	16	97	—	—	— (Note: "Forever Alone" did not enter the Billboard Mexico Airplay chart, but peaked at number 41 on the Mexico Espanol Airplay chart.)	89	31	—	—	—	CAPIF: Gold; PROMUSICAE: Platinum	Homerun
"Tal Vez"	2019	2	36	4	—	13	1	4	—	3	43	CAPIF: Gold; PROMUSICAE: 4× Platinum	Homerun
"Solo Pienso En Ti" (featuring De La Ghetto and Justin Quiles)	2019	11	—	—	—	—	12	33	—	—	—	PROMUSICAE: Gold	Homerun
"Por Eso Vine"	2019	16	27	—	—	23	29	47	—	17	—	PROMUSICAE: Platinum	Homerun
"Party" (featuring A Boogie wit da Hoodie)	2019	65	—	—	—	—	—	83	—	—	—		Non-album single
"Plan A"	2022	1	4	1	—	1	5	1	—	11	43	PROMUSICAE: Platinum; RIAA: Gold (Latin)	Back to the Game
"Chance"	2022	4	—	11	—	—	17	39	—	— (Note: "Chance" did not enter the Monitor Latino Top 20 Uruguay airplay chart, but peaked at number 16 on the Uruguayan Chamber of Disc's monthly digital singles chart.)	—		Back to the Game
"Paulo Londra: Bzrp Music Sessions, Vol. 23" (with Bizarrap)	2022	1	15	6	—	12	65	1	—	— (Note: "Paulo Londra: Bzrp Music Sessions, Vol. 23" did not enter the Monitor Latino Top 20 Uruguay airplay chart, but peaked at number one on the Uruguayan Chamber of Disc's monthly digital singles chart.)	—	AMPROFON: Gold; PROMUSICAE: 2× Platinum	Non-album single
"Nublado" (featuring Travis Barker)	2022	23	—	—	—	—	56	—	—	—	—		Back to the Game
"Luces"	2022	25	—	— (Note: "Luces" did not enter the Billboard Ecuador Songs chart, but peaked at number 19 on the Ecuador Pop Airplay chart.)	—	— (Note: "Luces" did not enter the Billboard Mexico Airplay chart, but peaked at number 25 on the Mexico Espanol Airplay chart.)	82	59	—	—	—		Back to the Game
"Julieta"	2022	82	—	—	—	—	—	—	—	—	—		Back to the Game
"Noche de Novela" (featuring Ed Sheeran)	2022	39	—	— (Note: "Noche de Novela" did not enter the Billboard Ecuador Songs chart, but peaked at number 16 on the Ecuador Urban Airplay chart.)	—	—	57	—	—	—	—		Back to the Game
"Party en el Barrio" (with Duki)	2022	8	—	—	—	—	81	30	—	—	—	PROMUSICAE: Gold	Back to the Game
"A Veces" (featuring Feid)	2022	50	9	19	—	—	44	13	—	—	—	PROMUSICAE: Gold	Back to the Game
"Necio" (featuring Lit Killah)	2022	59	—	—	—	—	—	—	—	—	—		Back to the Game
"Posdata"	2024	89	—	—	—	—	—	—	—	—	—		Non-album singles
"Paracaídas"	2024	—	—	—	—	—	87	—	—	—	—		Non-album singles
"Princesa" (with Luck Ra and Valentino Merlo)	2024	10	—	—	—	—	14	—	—	11	—		Non-album singles
"Recién Soltera"	2024	—	—	—	—	—	—	68	—	14	—		Non-album singles
"Que Hicimo'" (with Rusherking)	2024	84	—	—	—	—	—	—	—	—	—		Casa 11
"Protagonista" (with Lit Killah and Big One)	2024	—	—	—	—	—	—	—	—	—	—		Kustom
"Perreito Pa Llorar" (with Lola Indigo)	2024	—	—	—	—	—	—	19	—	—	—	PROMUSICAE: Gold	Nave Dragón
"Itamambuca" (with Luisa Sonza)	2025	—	—	—	—	—	—	—	—	—	—		Non-album singles
"A 200 (Remix)" (with King Savagge, Luck Ra, Jairo Vera, Bayron Fire y Lit Killah)	2025	—	—	—	—	—	—	—	—	—	—		Non-album singles
"Ramen Para Dos" (with María Becerra)	2025	—	—	—	—	—	—	—	—	—	—		Non-album singles
"—" denotes a recording that did not chart or was not released in that territory.

=== As a featured artist ===
List of singles as a featured artist showing year released
Title	Year	Album
"Ni Aqui Ni de Alla" (El Parcerito featuring Paulo Londra)	2017	Non-album single
"MVP (remix)" (Easykid featuring DrefQuila, Paulo Londra and Trainer)	2018	Non-album single

== Other charted songs ==
List of other charted songs, showing year released, chart positions, certifications, and originating album
Title	Year	Peak chart positions									Certifications	Album
Title	Year	ARG	AUS	CAN	COL	ECU	MEX	SPA	PAR	SWE Heat.	Certifications	Album
"Homerun (Intro)"	2019	43	—	—	—	—	—	86	—	—	PROMUSICAE: Gold	Homerun
"Y Yo No Sé"	2019	89	—	—	—	—	—	—	83	—		Homerun
"Nothing on You" (Ed Sheeran featuring Paulo Londra and Dave)	2019	19	65	85	90	89	48	68	—	6	CAPIF: Platinum; MC: Gold; BPI: Silver	No.6 Collaborations Project
"—" denotes a recording that did not chart or was not released in that territory.

== Guest appearances ==
List of non-single guest appearances, showing year released, other performing artists, and originating album
Title	Year	Other artist(s)	Album
"No Puedo Olvidarla"	2015	Col y Pipe	Revolución
"Astral (remix)"	2017	Duki; Wolf; Sync	Non-album single
"Nothing on You"	2019	Ed Sheeran; Dave	No.6 Collaborations Project
