= Solo Pienso En Ti (Paulo Londra song) =

2019 single by Paulo Londra featuring De la Ghetto and Justin Quiles

Single by Paulo Londra featuring De la Ghetto and Justin Quiles

from the album Homerun
- Released: May 14, 2019
- Genre: Latin trap; Latin R&B
- Length: 4:28
- Label: Big Ligas; Warner Latina
- Songwriters: Paulo Londra; Daniel Echavarría Oviedo; Rafael Castillo; Cristian Salazar; Justin Quiles; Pablo Christian Fuentes
- Producer: Ovy on the Drums

Paulo Londra singles chronology
"Tal Vez" (2019)	"Solo Pienso En Ti" (2019)	"Por Eso Vine" (2019)

De la Ghetto singles chronology
"Dios Bendiga (remix)" (2019)	"Solo Pienso En Ti" (2019)	"Te Enamoraste" (2019)

Justin Quiles singles chronology
"Comerte a Besos" (2019)	"Solo Pienso En Ti" (2019)	"Cuaderno" (2019)

Music video
- "Solo Pienso En Ti" on YouTube

"Solo Pienso En Ti" is a song by Argentine rapper and singer Paulo Londra featuring American singers De la Ghetto and Justin Quiles. It is the eighth single from Londra's debut studio album, Homerun (2019). The song was released on May 14, 2019 through Big Ligas and Warner Music Latina.

== Background and composition ==
On May 14, 2019, the song was released surprisingly, without any prior announcement or teaser. At the time of the release, Londra was attending at the 21st Annual Gardel Awards ceremony, where he won in the categories of Best Urban / Trap Collaboration and Best Urban / Trap Song for his single "Cuando Te Besé" in collaboration with American singer Becky G.

"Solo Pienso En Ti" was written by Londra, Cristian Salazar, Daniel Echavarria Oviedo, Justin Quiles, Pablo Christian Fuentes and Rafael Castillo. The musical track combines latin rhythms characteristic of trap and R&B. The lyrics of the song recount the difficulty of being able to forget a great love from the past and feeling regret for letting go of that special person who left a mark on their life.

== Commercial performance ==
The single debuted at position number 93 on the Billboard Argentina Hot 100. The following week, "Solo Pienso En Ti" reached the number 11 position on the chart.

== Accolades ==
Awards and nominations for "Sólo Pienso En Ti"
Year	Organization	Award	Result	Ref(s)
2020	Carlos Gardel Awards	Best Urban / Trap Collaboration	Nominated	

== Music video ==
The video was directed by Felipe Loaiza and features the three singers performing the song against various pastel-colored backgrounds (turquoise, yellow, and pink) in front of a microphone. It also includes the participation of Colombian model Natalia Bernal. On its first day, the video managed to garner 4 million views, which placed it at number 1 on the trending YouTube chart in Argentina. Meanwhile, in Spain, it reached the number 4 position.

== Credits and personnel ==
Credits are adapted from Jaxsta.

- Paulo Londra – songwriter, vocals
- Daniel Echavarría Oviedo (Ovy on the Drums)– songwriter, engineering, musical production
- Justin Quiles – songwriter, vocals
- Pablo Christian Fuentes – songwriter
- Rafael Castillo – songwriter, vocals
- Dave Kutch – engineering
- Alejandro "Mosty" Patiño – engineering
- Juan Pablo Builes – engineering

== Charts ==
Chart performance for "Sólo Pienso En Ti"
Chart (2019)	Peak position
Argentina Hot 100 (Billboard)	11
Argentina Digital Songs (CAPIF)	8
Argentina National (Monitor Latino)	18
Panama (PRODUCE)	86
Paraguay (SGP)	12
Peru (UNIMPRO)	323
Spain (Promusicae)	33

== Certifications ==
Region	Certification	Certified units/sales
Spain (Promusicae)	Gold	30,000^{‡}
Streaming
Chile (PROFOVI)	Gold	15,000,000
^{‡} Sales+streaming figures based on certification alone.

== Release history ==
Release dates and formats for "Sólo Pienso En Ti"
Region	Date	Version	Label	Ref.
Various	May 14, 2019	Digital download; streaming	Big Ligas; Warner Latina	
