= List of Billboard Argentina Hot 100 top-ten singles in 2018 =

This is a list of singles that charted in the top ten of the Billboard Argentina Hot 100 chart in 2018.

== Top-ten singles ==
Key

- ◁ – indicates single's top 10 entry was also its Hot 100 debut

List of Billboard Hot 100 top ten singles that peaked in 2018
Top ten entry date	Single	Artist(s)	Peak	Peak date	Weeks in top ten	Ref.
October 13	"Cuando Te Besé" ◁	Becky G and Paulo Londra	1	October 13	13	
October 13	"No Me Acuerdo" (Note: The single re-entered the top ten on the week ending February 24, 2019.) (Note: The single re-entered the top ten on the week ending March 31, 2019.) ◁	Thalía and Natti Natasha	2	October 13	15	
October 13	"Sin Pijama" ◁	Becky G and Natti Natasha	3	October 13	10	
October 13	"No Te Creas Tan Importante" ◁	Damas Gratis featuring Viru Kumbieron	4	October 13	7	
October 13	"Ya No Tiene Novio" ◁	Sebastián Yatra and Mau y Ricky	2	November 17	16	
October 13	"Me Vas a Extrañar" ◁	Damas Gratis featuring Viru Kumbieron	1	October 20	12	
October 13	"Vaina Loca" ◁	Ozuna and Manuel Turizo	6	October 20	8	
October 13	"No Es Justo" (Note: The single re-entered the top ten on the week ending December 1, 2018.) ◁	J Balvin and Zion & Lennox	8	October 13	2	
October 13	"Clandestino" ◁	Shakira and Maluma	8	October 20	3	
October 13	"Mi Cama (Remix)" ◁	Karol G and J Balvin featuring Nicky Jam	10	October 13	2	
October 20	"Me Niego"	Reik featuring Ozuna and Wisin	9	October 20	3	
October 27	"Taki Taki"	DJ Snake featuring Selena Gomez, Ozuna and Cardi B	1	November 3	21	
November 3	"Mia"	Bad Bunny featuring Drake	3	November 24	22	
November 10	"Amigos con Derechos" (Note: The single re-entered the top ten on the week ending December 29, 2019.)	Reik and Maluma	8	November 17	7	
November 10	"Bebe"	6ix9ine featuring Anuel AA	9	November 10	2	
November 24	"Adán y Eva"	Paulo Londra	1	December 8	24	

=== 2019 peaks ===
List of Billboard Hot 100 top ten singles in 2018 that peaked in 2019
Top ten entry date	Single	Artist(s)	Peak	Peak date	Weeks in top ten	Ref.
December 15	"Me Voy"	Rombai	5	February 10	14	

== See also ==
- List of Billboard Argentina Hot 100 number-one singles of 2018
