= Forever Alone (Paulo Londra song) =

Single by Paulo Londra

from the album Homerun
- Released: February 13, 2019
- Genre: Latin trap
- Length: 3:35
- Label: Big Ligas; Warner
- Songwriters: Paulo Londra; Daniel Echavarría Oviedo; Cristian Salazar
- Producer: Ovy on the Drums

Paulo Londra singles chronology
"Adán y Eva" (2018)	"Forever Alone" (2019)	"Tal Vez" (2019)

Music video
- "Forever Alone" on YouTube

"Forever Alone" is a song by Argentine rapper and singer Paulo Londra from his debut studio album, Homerun (2019). Big Ligas and Warner Music Latina released it as the album's six single on February 13, 2019. Londra co-wrote the song with the producer, Ovy on the Drums. A remix featuring American DJ and music producer Steve Aoki was released on April 1, 2019.

== Background ==
On January 24, 2019, Londra through his official Instagram account announced the release of the song. On January 30, he posted the cover of the single and confirmed that it would be released on February 13. That same day, he uploaded a preview of what would be the music video to his official YouTube channel.

== Lyrics and composition ==
"Forever Alone" is three minutes and 35 seconds long and it is a completely latin trap track. Ovy On The Drums produced the song and provided recording engineering.

In the song, Londra refers to single guys who enjoy good times with friends. The song is regarded as an anti-Valentine's Day anthem because its message is about spending the celebration away from romantic letters and the bouquets of flowers, that's why their launch was a day before February 14. "Forever Alone" it alludes to the internet meme of the black and white drawing that has the face in the shape of a potato, which shows an afflicted and tearful expression, which is often used to represent situations where the person pretends to be isolated and alone.

== Live performance ==
On February 23, 2019, Londra performed the song for the first time live in the city of Mendoza at the Civic Park, where he sang before more than 70 thousand people, within the framework of the City of Encounters Festival. On March 31 of that year, as part of Lollapalooza Argentina, Paulo performed the remix of the single with Steve Aoki, who was also part of the line-up of the festival.

== Credits and personnel ==
Credits are adapted from Jaxsta.

- Paulo Londra – songwriter, vocals
- Daniel Echavarría Oviedo – songwriter, engineering, musical production
- Cristian Salazar – songwriter
- Dave Kutch – engineering
- Alejandro "Mosty" Patiño – engineering

== Charts ==
=== Weekly charts ===
Chart performance for "Forever Alone"
Chart (2019)	Peak position
Argentina Hot 100 (Billboard)	16
Argentina National (Monitor Latino)	8
Colombia (National-Report)	97
Costa Rica Urban (Monitor Latino)	18
Mexico (Billboard Espanol Airplay)	41
Panama (PRODUCE)	85
Peru Urban (Monitor Latino)	5
Peru (UNIMPRO)	308
Spain (Promusicae)	31

=== Monthly charts ===
Monthly chart performance for "Forever Alone"
Chart (2019)	Peak position
Argentina Digital Songs (CAPIF)	10
Paraguay (SGP)	89

== Certifications ==
Certifications for "Forever Alone"
Region	Certification	Certified units/sales
Argentina (CAPIF)	Gold	10,000^{‡}
Spain (Promusicae)	Platinum	60,000^{‡}
^{‡} Sales+streaming figures based on certification alone.

== Release history ==
Release dates and formats for "Forever Alone"
Region	Date	Format(s)	Version	Label	Ref.
Various	February 13, 2019	Digital download; streaming	Original	Big Ligas; Warner	
Various	April 1, 2019	Digital download; streaming	Steve Aoki remix	Big Ligas	
