= List of number-one hits of 2018 (Argentina) =

Argentina's charts are provided by the Argentine Chamber of Phonograms and Videograms Producers (CAPIF) and Monitor Latino. While the former one provides monthly charts on physical album and digital singles sales.

== Albums ==
This is a list of the number-one hits of 2018 on the Argentina's Albums Charts chart, ranked by the Argentine Chamber of Phonograms and Videograms Producers (CAPIF).

Month	Album	Artist(s)	Ref.
January	Sogno	Andrea Bocelli	

== Singles ==
This is a list of the number-one hits of 2018 on the Argentina's Singles Charts chart, ranked by the Argentine Chamber of Phonograms and Videograms Producers (CAPIF).

Ref.	Song	Artist(s)	Ref.
January	"Corazón"	Maluma featuring Nego do Borel	
February	"Dura"	Daddy Yankee	
March	"Dura"	Daddy Yankee	
April	"X"	Nicky Jam and J Balvin	
May	"Te Boté (Remix)"	Nio García, Casper Mágico and Bad Bunny featuring Darell, Nicky Jam and Ozuna	
June	"Te Boté (Remix)"	Nio García, Casper Mágico and Bad Bunny featuring Darell, Nicky Jam and Ozuna	
July	"Sin Pijama"	Becky G and Natti Natasha	
August	"Cuando Te Besé"	Becky G and Paulo Londra	
September	"Cuando Te Besé"	Becky G and Paulo Londra	
October	"Taki Taki"	DJ Snake featuring Selena Gomez, Ozuna and Cardi B	
November	"Adán y Eva"	Paulo Londra	
December	"Adán y Eva"	Paulo Londra	

== See also ==
- 2018 in music
- Argentina Hot 100
- List of Billboard Argentina Hot 100 number-one singles of 2018
- List of airplay number-one hits of the 2010s (Argentina)
