= Ovy on the Drums =

Colombian producer, songwriter, and musician (born 1991)

- Echavarría at the 2026 Latin Grammy Awards
- Born: Daniel Echavarría Oviedo; 9 January 1991 (age 35); Medellín, Colombia
- Occupations: Record producer; songwriter
- Years active: 2016-present
- Musical career
- Genres: Reggaeton; urban pop; Latin R&B; Latin trap
- Label: Warner Latina

Daniel Echavarría Oviedo (born 9 January 1991), known professionally as Ovy on the Drums, is a Colombian record producer, songwriter and former footballer. He is a longtime collaborator of Colombian singer-songwriter Karol G, and has also worked with Blessd, Micro TDH, Myke Towers, and Shakira, among other Latin music acts. Echavarría won a Latin Grammy for Album of the Year and a Grammy Award for Best Música Urbana Album for his production work on Karol G's 2023 album Mañana Será Bonito. He has received a total of eight Latin Grammy nominations. Described as "one of Latin music's top producers", Echavarría has had 32 entries on Billboard's Hot Latin Songs chart as of 2022.

== Early life ==
Daniel Echavarría Oviedo was born in Medellín, Colombia in January 1991. As a child he enjoyed listening to Bob Marley, Modern Talking, The Pet Shop Boys, and the salsa that he heard played at parties. As a teenager, he worked selling chicken and party supplies in a market square in Medellín; he attributed learning the value of hard work to this experience as he would wake up at 3:00am and finish work at 5:00pm. A friend of his cousin introduced Echavarría to beat-making and audio production using FL Studio, a software he has continued using ever since. Echavarría attended school at the Institución Educativa La Salle de Campoamor in Medellín. As a student, he described himself as "dress[ing] as a reggaeton artist" while singing and making videos in Windows Movie Maker. Music became a way for him to channel his restlessness and hyperactivity. Echavarría describes his parents as "the first people who believed in [him] as a musician", giving him a computer and some equipment to make music with. Echavarría briefly played football as a left-back for the Itagüí based Águilas Doradas while they were a Colombian second division, or 'Categoría Primera B', team.

== Music career ==
Echavarría sold his early beats at $5 each, before gradually building connections in the music scene and becoming acquainted with local producers and industry professionals. Echavarría's breakthrough opportunity came as a DJ for Karol G, via an introduction from producers La Compañía, on a tour of Colombian universities. Echavarría went on to work with Giraldo on the production of her debut album Unstoppable, released in 2017.

Echavarría worked on Karol G's 2019 song "Tusa", featuring Nicki Minaj, which received nominations for two Latin Grammy Awards in the categories of Record of the Year and Song of the Year. "Tusa" was the lead single for Giraldo's third studio album KG0516 (2021). The track went on to surpass one billion Spotify streams in April 2021.

In 2020, Argentine singer Paulo Londra named Echavarría as a defendant, alongside Big Ligas LLC, Cristian Andrés Salazar, Ritholz Levy Fields LLP, Matthew Greenberg, and Stephanie Chopurian, in a civil case in the Circuit Court of the Eleventh Judicial Circuit of Miami-Dade county, Florida described as a "complex business dispute". The case involved a dispute concerning the rights to Londra's releases and gained public attention. The case was settled on amicable terms in November 2021.

In 2022, Echavarría received nominations at the 23rd Annual Latin Grammy Awards in the categories of Best Urban Song for "Mamiii", Record and Song of the Year for "Provenza", and Album of the Year for Sebastián Yatra's album Dharma. In the same year, Billboard listed Echavarría at number three on the end of year list of 'Hot Latin Songs Producer of the Year', and at number 21 on the Hot 100 Producer of the Year list. He also received a nomination for Producer of the Year at the 2022 Billboard Latin Music Awards. In the same year, Echavarría signed a partnership with record label Warner Music Latina.

In 2023, he took part in Spotify's Radar program to support emerging artists in developing a global platform, recording singles with Junior Zamora, Valentina Rico, and Loyal Lobos. In March 2023, Echavarría appeared on the Billboard Hot 100 for the first time as a co-lead artist, with Karol G's "Cairo" debuting at number 83.

In November 2024, his song "Mírame", with fellow Colombian singer-songwriter Blessd, reached the number one position on the Billboard Latin Rhythm Airplay chart, becoming Echavarría's first number one song as an artist on a Billboard chart.

== Credits ==
=== Albums: as producer ===
- Donde Quiero Estar (2023) with Quevedo
- Emmanuel (2020) with Anuel AA
- Homerun (2019) with Paulo Londra
- Los Dioses (2021) with Anuel AA and Ozuna
- KG0516 (2021) with Karol G
- Las Leyendas Nunca Mueren (2021) with Anuel AA
- Mañana Será Bonito (2023) with Karol G
- Mañana Será Bonito (Bichota Season) (2023) with Karol G
- Ocean (2019) with Karol G
- Unstoppable (2017) with Karol G

=== Notable song recordings: as producer ===
- "La Plena (W Sound 05)" (2025) with W Sound, Beéle and Ovy On The Drums
- "+57" (2024) with Karol G, Feid, DFZM, J Balvin, Maluma, Ryan Castro and Blessd
- "200 Copas" (2021) with Karol G
- "Adán y Eva" (2018) with Paulo Londra
- "Ay, Dios Mio!" (2020) with Karol G and Danny Ocean
- "Bichota" (2020) with Karol G
- "Cairo" (2022) with Karol G
- "Chica Paranormal" (2018) with Paulo Londra
- "Condenado Para el Millón" (2017) with Paulo Londra
- "Cuando Te Besé" (2018) with Becky G and Paulo Londra
- "Dímelo" (2018) with Paulo Londra
- "El Barco" (2021) with Karol G
- "Forever Alone" (2019) with Paulo Londra
- "Fútbol y Rumba" (2020) with Anuel AA and Enrique Iglesias
- "Location" (2021) with Karol G, Anuel AA, and J Balvin
- "Mamiii" (2022) with Becky G and Karol G
- "Mientras Me Curo del Cora" (2023) with Karol G
- "Nena Maldición" (2018) with Paulo Londra and Lenny Tavárez
- "Playa del Inglés" (2022) with Quevedo and Myke Towers
- "Por Eso Vine" (2019) with Paulo Londra
- "Provenza" (2022) with Karol G
- "Qlona" (2022) with Karol G and Peso Pluma
- "Sin Señal" (2022) with Quevedo
- "Solo Pienso En Ti" (2019) with Paulo Londra, De la Ghetto and Justin Quiles
- "Tal Vez" (2019) with Paulo Londra
- "Te Amo" (2018) with Piso 21
- "Te Fuiste" (2021) with Enrique Iglesias and Myke Towers
- "TQG" (2023) with Karol G and Shakira
- "Tusa" (2021) with Karol G and Nicki Minaj
- "Watati" (2023) with Karol G and Aldo Ranks
- "X Si Volvemos" (2023) with Karol G and Romeo Santos

=== Motion picture soundtrack appearances ===
- "L.H.N.A" featured in The Tax Collector (2020), directed by David Ayer
- "La Vida Es Una" (2022) featured in Puss in Boots: The Last Wish (2022), directed by Joel Crawford
- "Watati" featured in Barbie (2023), directed by Greta Gerwig

== Discography ==
=== Extended plays ===
List of extended plays, with selected details
Title	EP details
Cassette 01 (with Myke Towers)	Released: 14 March 2024; Labels: King Ovy LLC, One World International; Format: Digital download, streaming
Cassette 02 (Chile)	Released: 13 March 2025; Labels: King Ovy LLC, Big Ligas; Format: Digital download, streaming

=== Singles ===
==== As lead artist ====
List of singles as lead artist, with selected chart positions, showing year released and album name
Title	Year	Peak chart positions									Certifications	Album
Title	Year	US	US Latin	ARG	CHI	COL	ECU	PER	SPA	WW	Certifications	Album
"Inolvidable" (with Beéle)	2020	—	—	14	—	—	—	—	83	—	RIAA: 2× Platinum (Latin); PROMUSICAE: Platinum	Non-album singles
"Sigo Buscándote" (with Mau y Ricky)	2020	—	—	41	—	—	—	—	—	—	RIAA: Gold (Latin)	Non-album singles
"¿Miedito o Qué?" (with Danny Ocean featuring Karol G)	2020	—	33	15	—	—	—	—	—	—	RIAA: Platinum (Latin)	Non-album singles
"Tendencia Global" (with Blessd and Myke Towers)	2022	—	—	—	—	4	16	—	56	—	RIAA: 2× Platinum (Latin); PROMUSICAE: Gold	Non-album singles
"Sin Señal" (with Quevedo)	2022	—	—	98	—	—	—	—	4	—	PROMUSICAE: 7× Platinum	Donde Quiero Estar
"Cairo" (with Karol G)	2022	82	11	53	25	12	21	19	14	51	RIAA: 4× Platinum (Latin); PROMUSICAE: 4× Platinum	Mañana Será Bonito
"Chao, Bebé" (with Ozuna)	2022	—	—	98	—	—	—	—	79	—		Non-album singles
"El Hechizo" (with Peso Pluma)	2023	—	33	—	—	—	—	—	—	—	RIAA: 2× Platinum (Latin)	Non-album singles
"Te Mentí" (with Ozuna and Saiko)	2023	—	—	—	—	—	—	—	31	—	PROMUSICAE: Gold	Non-album singles
"Gangster (PQFNEDG)" (with Quevedo and Yandel)	2023	—	—	—	—	—	—	—	31	—	PROMUSICAE: Gold	Non-album singles
"Piscina" (with María Becerra and Chencho Corleone)	2023	—	—	4	—	—	—	—	84	—		Non-album singles
"Desataaa" (with Myke Towers and Saiko)	2023	—	—	—	—	—	—	—	6	—	PROMUSICAE: Platinum	Cassette 01
"Godiva" (with Myke Towers, Blessd and Ryan Castro)	2023	—	—	—	—	8	—	—	70	—		Cassette 01
"Mírame" (with Blessd)	2024	— (Note: "Mirame" did not enter the Billboard Hot 100, but peaked at number 5 on the Bubbling Under Hot 100 chart.)	13	95	7	1	2	7	11	58	RIAA: 3× Platinum(Latin); PROMUSICAE: Platinum	Non-album singles
"Mi Refe" (with Beéle)	2024	—	44	—	23	11	17	15	3	71		Non-album singles
"La Plena (W Sound 05)" (with W Sound and Beéle)	2025	— (Note: "La Plena (W Sound 05)" did not enter the Billboard Hot 100, but peaked at number 14 on the Bubbling Under Hot 100 chart.)	9	1	1	—	1	1	1	11		Non-album singles
"Amista" (with Blessd)	2025	—	43	—	—	—	6	—	54	154		Non-album singles
"Yo y Tú" (with Quevedo and Beéle)	2025	—	39	—	—	—	—	—	3	82		Non-album singles
"Undercromo (W Sound 06)" (with W Sound and Dei V)	2025	—	—	—	—	—	—	—	65	—		Non-album singles
"—" denotes a title that was not released or did not chart in that territory.

==== As featured artist ====
List of singles as featured artist, with certificationsList of singles as lead artist, with selected chart positions, showing year released and album name
Title	Year	Peak chart positions									Certifications	Album
Title	Year	US	US Latin	ARG	CHI	COL	ECU	PER	SPA	WW	Certifications	Album
"La Lá" (Mike Bahía featuring Ovy on the Drums)	2020	—	—	—	—	—	—	—	—	—	RIAA: Gold (Latin)	Non-album singles
"+57" (Karol G, Feid and DFZM featuring Ovy on the Drums, J Balvin, Maluma, Ryan Castro and Blessd)	2024	62	4	62	9	1	1	8	4	20		Non-album singles

==== Other charted songs ====
List of other charted songs, with selected chart positions, showing year released and album name
Title	Year	Peak chart positions	Certifications	Album
Title	Year	SPA	Certifications	Album
"Dime Bbsita (remix)" (with Robledo and Lalo Ebratt featuring Omar Montes and Alex Martini)	2020	47	PROMUSICAE: Gold	Non-album single
"Portate Bonito" (with Anuel AA and Blessd)	2025	65		Non-album single
