= Nena Maldición =

Single by Paulo Londra featuring Lenny Tavárez

from the album Homerun
- Language: Spanish
- English title: "Damn, Baby"
- Released: January 29, 2018
- Genre: Latin ballad; Reggaeton; Latin trap
- Length: 3:48
- Label: Big Ligas; Warner
- Songwriters: Paulo Londra; Daniel Echavarría Oviedo; Cristian Salazar; Julio Manuel González Tavárez
- Producer: Ovy on the Drums

Paulo Londra singles chronology
"Condenado Para el Millón" (2017)	"Nena Maldición" (2018)	"Te Amo" (2018)

Lenny Tavárez singles chronology
"Yo No Lo Veo (Remix)" (2017)	"Nena Maldición" (2018)	"Toma Bebé (Remix)" (2018)

Music video
- "Nena Maldición" on YouTube

"Nena Maldición" is a song by Argentine rapper and singer Paulo Londra featuring Puerto Rican singer Lenny Tavárez from the former's debut studio album Homerun (2019). The song was released on January 29, 2018, as the album's second single through Big Ligas and Warner Music Latina.

== Background and composition ==
On January 14, 2018, Londra took to social media to reveal the cover art and announce the release of the song for January 29. "Nena Maldición" was largely composed by Londra and produced by Ovy on the Drums. The song was described as a "honeyed" latin ballad that incorporates sounds of reggaeton and latin trap.

== Commercial performance ==
In Argentina, the song debut at number 82 on the Billboard Argentina Hot 100 during the tracking week of October 13, 2018. "Nena Maldición" spent 14 weeks on the tally, peaking at number 61 that same year.

== Music video ==
The music video was directed by Jonathan Quintero and it premiered the same day as the single. It features appearances by Colombian model and dancer Isabela Castro Arango. In his first day, the video obtain two and a half million views on YouTube, which placed among the top 20 trends in Latin America. In November 2021, the video managed to surpass one billion views, thus becoming the second most viewed video on Londra's channel, just behind "Adán y Eva", and making him the first Argentine musical artist to achieve that two of their videos surpassing this figure.

== Credits and personnel ==
Credits are adapted from Jaxsta.

- Paulo Londra – songwriter, vocals
- Daniel Echavarría Oviedo – songwriter, engineering, musical production
- Cristian Salazar – songwriter
- Julio Manuel González Tavárez – songwriter, vocals
- Wain – engineering

== Charts ==
=== Weekly charts ===
Chart performance for "Nena Maldición"
Chart (2018)	Peak position
Argentina Hot 100 (Billboard)	61
Argentina National (Monitor Latino)	6
Costa Rica (Monitor Latino)	9
El Salvador (Monitor Latino)	13
Honduras (Monitor Latino)	7
Mexico (Billboard Espanol Airplay)	40
Nicaragua (Monitor Latino)	6
Paraguay (Monitor Latino)	10
Peru (Monitor Latino)	5
Peru (UNIMPRO)	84

=== Monthly charts ===
Monthly chart performance for "Nena Maldición"
Chart (2018)	Peak position
Argentina Digital Songs (CAPIF)	7
Panama (PRODUCE)	156
Paraguay (SGP)	32

=== Year-end charts ===
Year-end chart performance for "Nena Maldición"
Chart (2018)	Position
El Salvador (Monitor Latino)	55
Honduras (Monitor Latino)	22
Nicaragua (Monitor Latino)	33
Paraguay (Monitor Latino)	47
Peru (Monitor Latino)	64

== Certifications ==
Certifications for "Nena Maldición"
Region	Certification	Certified units/sales
Argentina (CAPIF)	2× Platinum	40,000^{‡}
Spain (Promusicae)	2× Platinum	120,000^{‡}
United States (RIAA)	7× Platinum (Latin)	420,000^{‡}
Streaming
Chile (PROFOVI)	Platinum	32,000,000
^{‡} Sales+streaming figures based on certification alone.

== Release history ==
Release dates and formats for "Nena Maldición"
Region	Date	Format(s)	Label	Ref.
Various	January 29, 2018	Digital download; streaming	Big Ligas; Warner	
