= Mírame (Blessd and Ovy on the Drums song) =

Single by Blessd and Ovy on the Drums
- Language: Spanish
- English title: Look at Me
- Released: April 17, 2024
- Genre: Reggaeton
- Length: 2:37
- Label: Cigol; Warner Music Latina
- Songwriters: Stiven Mesa Londoño; Daniel Echavarría Oviedo; Kevyn Cruz
- Producer: Ovy on the Drums

Blessd singles chronology
"Gangsters en la Disco" (2024)	"Mírame" (2024)	"WYA (remix black and yellow)" (2024)

Ovy on the Drums singles chronology
"Piscina" (2024)	"Mírame" (2024)	"Soltera (W Sound 01)" (2024)

Music video
- "Mírame" on YouTube

"Mírame"(transl. "Look at Me") is a song by Colombian singer Blessd and Colombian producer and songwriter Ovy on the Drums. It was written by Blessd, Keityn and Ovy on the Drums, and produced by the latter.

== Background ==
On March 29, 2024, Blessd previewed the song on Instagram.

== Commercial performance ==
"Mírame" debuted at number 32 on the US Billboard Hot Latin Songs chart dated July 13, 2024, before reaching its peak at number 13 two weeks later. On the Billboard Global 200 chart, the song debuted at number 175 on the chart dated July 13, 2024. On August 3, 2024, it reached its peak at number 58 on the chart. "Mírame" reached the top of the Billboard Latin Rhythm Airplay chart on the issue dated November 9, 2024 and peaked at number three on the Billboard Latin Airplay chart dated November 2, 2024. On Spain's PROMUSICAE chart dated June 28, 2024, the song debuted at number 93 before reaching its peak at number 28 three weeks later.

"Mírame" debuted at number five on the Billboard Colombia Songs chart dated May 4, 2024 and reached its top on the issue dated July 20, 2024. The song landed up at the first position of the Billboard Ecuador Songs chart on November 2, 2024. It also peaked at number five in Bolivia and at number seven in Chile and Peru.

== Music video ==
The music video for the song was released on April 17, 2024, on Blessd's YouTube channel and has reached over 210 million views by December, 2024.

== Charts ==
Chart performance for "Mírame"
Chart (2024)	Peak position
Argentina Hot 100 (Billboard)	86
Bolivia (Billboard)	5
Chile (Billboard)	7
Colombia (Billboard)	1
Colombia (Monitor Latino)	1
Ecuador (Billboard)	1
Ecuador (Monitor Latino)	10
Global 200 (Billboard)	58
Peru (Billboard)	7
Peru (Monitor Latino)	6
Puerto Rico (Monitor Latino)	2
Spain (PROMUSICAE)	11
US Bubbling Under Hot 100 (Billboard)	5
US Hot Latin Songs (Billboard)	13
US Latin Airplay (Billboard)	3
US Latin Rhythm Airplay (Billboard)	1

== Certifications ==
Certifications for "Mírame"
Region	Certification	Certified units/sales
Mexico (AMPROFON)	Platinum+Gold	210,000^{‡}
Spain (Promusicae)	2× Platinum	120,000^{‡}
United States (RIAA)	8× Platinum (Latin)	480,000^{‡}
United States (RIAA) Remix version	2× Platinum (Latin)	120,000^{‡}
^{‡} Sales+streaming figures based on certification alone.
