= Homerun (Paulo Londra album) =

2019 studio album by Paulo Londra

Studio album by Paulo Londra
- Released: 23 May 2019
- Recorded: 2017–2019
- Genre: Latin trap
- Length: 62:07
- Label: Big Ligas; Warner Latina
- Producer: Ovy on the Drums

Paulo Londra chronology
Dímelo (2018)	Homerun (2019)	Back to the Game (2022)

Singles from Homerun
- 1. "Condenado Para el Millón" Released: 4 December 2017; 2. "Nena Maldición" Released: 29 January 2018; 3. "Dímelo" Released: 7 May 2018; 4. "Chica Paranormal" Released: 23 July 2018; 5. "Adán y Eva" Released: 5 November 2018; 6. "Forever Alone" Released: 13 February 2019; 7. "Tal Vez" Released: 3 April 2019; 8. "Solo Pienso En Ti" Released: 14 May 2019; 9. "Por Eso Vine" Released: 27 June 2019

Homerun is the debut studio album by Argentine rapper and singer Paulo Londra. It was released on 23 May 2019 by Big Ligas and Warner Music Latina. It was written and recorded with Londra working closely alongside Ovy on the Drums. A sonically diverse urban record with reggaeton songs and sentimental ballads, Homerun experiments with latin trap influences, using a variety of guitar and keyboard sounds from hip hop and Caribbean styles.

Homerun topped album charts in Argentina. It debuted at number three in Chile and Spain; and number four in Mexico. In the United States, Homerun debuted at number twelve in the Billboard Top Latin Albums with first-week 3,000 album-equivalent unit. Nine singles were released from the album, including the international number-one track "Adán y Eva", and the top-10 charting "Nena Maldición", "Dímelo", "Chica Paranormal" and "Tal Vez". At the 22nd Annual Gardel Awards, the album received nominations for Album of the Year and Best Urban Music / Trap Album. In support of the album, Londra embarked on the Homerun Tour in 2019 and 2020.

== Background ==
On May 9, 2019, Londra announced through his social networks that the album would be released on May 23 of that year. That month, Paulo, through his Instagram account, revealed the cover and aesthetics of the album; and Warner Music Latina also unveiled the complete list of songs that would integrate the album. The album, musically, was described as a work with varied rhythms, where "happy and intelligent rhymes" predominate. Its lyrical content "comes from the need to not give half-hearted efforts" and "means will, effort and the example of showing that it is worth doing what you like despite the adversities".

== Music and lyrics ==
Homerun has been described as a genre-hopping reggaeton, latin trap and hip hop. The standard edition of the album contains eighteen tracks and its style is generally characterized by the use of spanglish as a musical resource and Latin American idioms abound in its lyrics.

=== Songs ===
The opening and title track "Homerun (Intro)" is an acoustic track accompanied by a guitar and "works as a summary of the relaxed and grateful character" that Londra is. The second track and seventh single "Tal Vez" is a ballad with reggaeton rhythms, where he talks about "a love that wasn't" and "shows himself deceived". "No Puedo" is described as a "pure trap" song, reflecting "the desperation of not being able to forget a lost love and wanting to get it back". The next track and fifth single "Adán y Eva" is an urban song with "reggae sounds, melodic tones and a romantic lyric that talks about the conquest of a girl and the beginning of a relationship". The fifth track "Demasiado Loco" has a "calm and stripped down base" with rhymes that make a difference, where a "romantic and nostalgic side" shines through. "Maldita Abusadora", the sixth song, is a piece linked "to a rock ballad" with the sound of "a couple of electric guitars". The next track and seventh on the album, "Y Yo No Sé" is a slow reggaeton and is about "waking up in an unfamiliar room" talking "to a fucking minx". The eighth track "So Fresh" has a hip-hop beat, highlighting in the lyrics the phrase: "Ey, mami, no me muero hasta mi Grammy" (Hey, mommy, I ain't dying till my Grammy). The ninth song "Querido Amigo” is characterized for being a trap piece that talks about a boy who steals his friend's girlfriend.

The song "Romeo y Julieta" features elements of trap, dembow and reggaeton. "Por Eso Vine" is a song that mixes trap with reggaeton, using a cumbiero bass as a complement, although it "adds precious keyboards and synthesized strings that elevate it from the average". The twelfth track "Solo Pienso En Ti" also has trap and reggaeton sounds, describing him as a "centennial Romeo". "Forever Alone" is a track that follows the formula of a trap ballad, reminiscent of the song that precedes it. The song and second single "Nena Maldición" is a "mellow ballad". The next track "Dímelo" is a song with Caribbean trap influences. The track and fourth single "Chica Paranormal" is a purely trap song, which talks about "a girl you fall in love with but who is dangerous at the same time". The album's closing song "Sigan Hablando de Mí" is a trap track that is aimed at detractors, in which he sings: “Yo tengo talento, ustedes plata” (I have talent, you have money).

== Promotion and release ==
On the day of the album's release, Londra offered an event called Homerun Experience at the Art Medio Complex in Buenos Aires, where in addition to presenting his album, he also interacted with fans.

=== Cover artwork ===
The album's name refers to the best baseball play known as the home run and the album cover features a photo of Londra as a child wearing an upside down cap and a sweatshirt with Garfield batting and above the character is inscribed the word Home Run.

=== Tour ===
In June 2019, Paulo announced his Homerun Tour in support and promotion of the album, with which he visited Paraguay, Costa Rica, Chile, Spain, Peru, Panama, Guatemala, Uruguay and some cities in Argentina.

== Critical reception ==
Londra's first album garnered positive reviews from the press, which highlighted above all his lyrics far from vulgarity. Karen Montero of the Spanish magazine Mondo Sonoro valued that Londra managed to build an album "without drugs, insults or violence" and on the contrary provides a material with "stories of post-adolescent love and innocence with traces of badass", however, she mentioned that Homerun "is an album without surprises", but that it is "intriguing". Rodrigo Guerra of the Uruguayan newspaper El País noted that the album has "catchy rhythms" and "honest lyrics". Juan Manuel Garrido of the Spanish website Urban Rooster News praised Londra's work, saying that he is a "talented and very versatile artist who can adapt to different musical genres" and noted that Paulo in the song "Maldita Abusadora achieves a spectacular and catchy melody with only two guitars".

The American magazine Billboard praised Londra's work, writing that the artist "has made all the right moves; that he relied on singles and few but timely collaborations that allowed him to grow". In addition, the magazine noted that "Homerun has a sonic backbone that never leaves behind the unmistakable color of Paulo's voice and his way of phrasing", comparing his work as a similarity to Drake's Views (2016) and Ed Sheeran's ÷ (2017) albums.

== Commercial performance ==
In its first week, Homerun debuted at number one on Spotify Spain's top 200 with more than six million plays. This achievement took Homerun to the number 3 position in PROMUSICAE's list of music albums. In Argentina, the album was awarded a double diamond award by the label Warner Music Latina. In the United States, in the week of May 30, 2019, the album reached the number 10 position on Billboard's Latin Rhythm Albums chart and in its first week managed to sell 3,000 units in the American territory. Homerun debuted on Billboard's Top Latin Albums charting at number 12, for a combined total of 185,000 album units sold in the United States.

== Accolades ==
List of awards and nominations received by Homerun
Year	Award	Category	Result	Ref.
2020	Lo Nuestro Awards	Album of the Year	Nominated	
2020	Gardel Awards	Album of the Year	Nominated	
2020	Gardel Awards	Best Urban Music / Trap Album	Nominated	

== Track listing ==
All tracks are written by Paulo Ezequiel Londra, Cristian Salazar and Daniel Echevarría Oviedo, and produced by the latter, except where noted.

Homerun track listing
No.	Title	Writer(s)	Producer(s)	Length
1.	"Homerun (Intro)"	Paulo Londra; Daniel Echavarría Oviedo; Cristian Salazar	Ovy on the Drums	2:29
2.	"Tal Vez"	Londra; Echavarría Oviedo; Salazar	Ovy on the Drums	4:23
3.	"No Puedo"	Londra; Echavarría Oviedo; Salazar	Ovy on the Drums	2:55
4.	"Adán y Eva"	Londra; Echavarría Oviedo; Salazar	Ovy on the Drums	4:16
5.	"Demasiado Loco"	Londra; Echavarría Oviedo; Salazar	Ovy on the Drums	2:46
6.	"Maldita Abusadora"	Londra; Echavarría Oviedo; Salazar	Ovy on the Drums	4:10
7.	"Y Yo No Sé"	Londra; Echavarría Oviedo; Salazar	Ovy on the Drums	3:10
8.	"So Fresh"	Londra; Echavarría Oviedo	Ovy on the Drums	2:47
9.	"Querido Amigo"	Londra; Echavarría Oviedo; Salazar	Ovy on the Drums	3:48
10.	"Romeo y Julieta"	Londra; Echavarría Oviedo; Salazar	Ovy on the Drums	3:01
11.	"Por Eso Vine"	Londra; Echavarría Oviedo; Salazar	Ovy on the Drums	2:58
12.	"Solo Pienso En Ti" (featuring De La Ghetto and Justin Quiles)	Londra; Echevarría Oviedo; Rafael Castillo; Salazar; Justin Quiles; Pablo Christian Fuentes	Ovy on the Drums	4:28
13.	"Forever Alone"	Londra; Echavarría Oviedo; Salazar	Ovy on the Drums	3:34
14.	"Condenado Para el Millón"	Londra; Echavarría Oviedo; Salazar	Ovy on the Drums	3:42
15.	"Nena Maldición" (featuring Lenny Tavárez)	Londra; Echavarría Oviedo; Julio Manuel González Tavárez; Salazar	Ovy on the Drums	3:47
16.	"Dímelo"	Londra; Echavarría Oviedo; Salazar	Ovy on the Drums	3:32
17.	"Chica Paranormal"	Londra; Echavarría Oviedo; Salazar	Ovy on the Drums	3:41
18.	"Sigan Hablando de Mí"	Londra; Echavarría Oviedo; Salazar	Ovy on the Drums	2:40
Total length:				62:07

== Personnel ==
Credits adapted from Tidal.

- Paulo Londra – primary vocals
- De La Ghetto – featured vocals (track 12)
- Justin Quiles – featured vocals (track 12)
- Lenny Tavárez – featured vocals (track 15)
- OvyOnTheDrums – production, recording engineering
- Dave Kutch – mastering (tracks 1–3, 5, 7–14, 16–18)
- Colin Leonard – mastering (track 4)
- Mosty – mastering (track 6), mixing (1–3, 5–13, 17–18)
- Wain – mastering (track 15), mixing (14–16)
- Juan Pablo Builes – mixing (tracks 1–3, 5–9, 11–12, 18)
- Jaycen Joshua – mixing (track 4)

== Charts ==
=== Weekly charts ===
Weekly chart performance for Homerun
Chart (2019)	Peak position
Argentine Albums (CAPIF)	1
Chilean Albums (Punto Musical)	3
Mexican Albums (AMPROFON)	4
Spanish Albums (Promusicae)	3
US Top Latin Albums (Billboard)	12
US Latin Rhythm Albums (Billboard)	10

=== Year-end charts ===
Year-end chart performance for Homerun
Chart (2019)	Position
Mexican Albums (AMPROFON)	59
US Top Latin Albums (Billboard)	43
Chart (2020)	Position
Spanish Albums (PROMUSICAE)	86
Chart (2021)	Position
Spanish Albums (PROMUSICAE)	77

== Certifications ==
Region	Certification	Certified units/sales
Argentina	2× Diamond	
Spain (Promusicae)	Gold	20,000^{‡}
United States (RIAA)	4× Platinum (Latin)	240,000^{‡}
^{‡} Sales+streaming figures based on certification alone.

== Release history ==
Release dates and formats for Homerun
Region	Date	Format(s)	Edition	Label	Ref.
Various	May 23, 2019	CD; digital download; streaming	Standard	Big Ligas; Warner Music Latina	
