= Por Eso Vine =

Single by Paulo Londra

from the album Homerun
- Language: Spanish
- English title: "That's Why I Came"
- Released: June 27, 2019
- Genre: Reggaeton; Latin trap
- Length: 2:58
- Label: Big Ligas; Warner
- Songwriters: Paulo Londra; Daniel Echavarría Oviedo; Cristian Salazar
- Producer: Ovy on the Drums

Paulo Londra singles chronology
"Solo Pienso En Ti" (2019)	"Por Eso Vine" (2019)	"Party" (2019)

Music video
- "Por Eso Vine" on YouTube

"Por Eso Vine" is a song by Argentine rapper and singer Paulo Londra. The song was released on June 27, 2019, through Big Ligas and Warner Music Latina as the ninth single from Londra's debut studio album, Homerun (2019).

== Background and composition ==
On May 15, 2019, a day after the release of his single "Sólo Pienso En Ti", Londra unveiled on social media the aesthetics of his debut album Homerun along with the tracklist, among which "Por Eso Vine". On June 7, Londra was spotted filming a new music video in his hometown, and shortly after, he announced that "Por Eso Vine" would be released as the next single from the album.

"Por Eso Vine" is a reggaeton song with latin trap influences. The single was described as a song about heartbreak, in which a woman continuously experiences romantic disappointment that she seems unable to overcome until a guy arrives, willing to change everything.

== Commercial performance ==
The song debuted at number 85 on the Billboard Argentina Hot 100, and the following week, it climbed 38 positions to reach spot 47 on the chart, earning it the title of the "Top Picker" of the week. In the week of July 13, the single reached its peak, landing at the 16th position on the chart.

== Music video ==
The video was filmed in a bar located in the Güemes neighborhood in Córdoba, where the production was handled by Orco Videos. In the music video, Londra takes on the role of a film director, who orchestrates a set-up to try to bring together two individuals who ultimately end up falling in love. Within 24 hours of its premiere, the video managed to surpass 2 million views on YouTube.

== Credits and personnel ==
Credits are adapted from Jaxsta.

- Paulo Londra – songwriter, vocals
- Daniel Echavarría Oviedo – songwriter, engineering, musical production
- Dave Kutch – engineering
- Alejandro "Mosty" Patiño – engineering
- Juan Pablo Builes – engineering

== Charts ==
=== Weekly charts ===
Chart performance for "Por Eso Vine"
Chart (2019)	Peak position
Argentina Hot 100 (Billboard)	16
Argentina National (Monitor Latino)	5
Argentina Latin (Monitor Latino)	19
Colombia (National-Report)	27
Costa Rica (Monitor Latino)	6
Mexico (Billboard Mexican Airplay)	23
Mexico (Billboard Espanol Airplay)	7
Mexico Pop (Monitor Latino)	18
Peru (Monitor Latino)	16
Peru (UNIMPRO)	168
Spain (Promusicae)	47
Uruguay (Monitor Latino)	17

=== Monthly charts ===
Monthly chart performance for "Por Eso Vine"
Chart (2019)	Peak position
Paraguay (SGP)	29

=== Year-end charts ===
Year-end chart performance for "Por Eso Vine"
Chart (2019)	Position
Peru (Monitor Latino)	92
Chart (2020)	Position
Costa Rica (Monitor Latino)	99

== Certifications ==
Certifications for "Por Eso Vine"
Region	Certification	Certified units/sales
Spain (Promusicae)	Platinum	60,000^{‡}
^{‡} Sales+streaming figures based on certification alone.

== Release history ==
Release dates and formats for "Por Eso Vine"
Region	Date	Version	Label	Ref.
Various	June 27, 2019	Digital download; streaming	Big Ligas; Warner	
