= Tal Vez (Paulo Londra song) =

2019 song by Paulo Londra

Single by Paulo Londra

from the album Homerun
- Language: Spanish
- Released: April 3, 2019
- Length: 4:23
- Label: Big Ligas; Warner Music Latina
- Songwriters: Paulo Londra; Jairo Bascope; Daniel Oviedo; Cristian Salazar
- Producer: Ovy on the Drums

Paulo Londra singles chronology
"Forever Alone" (2018)	"Tal Vez" (2019)	"Solo Pienso En Ti" (2019)

Music video
- "Tal Vez" on YouTube

"Tal Vez" (transl. Perhaps) is a song by Argentine rapper Paulo Londra. Released by Warner Latina and Big Ligas on April 4, 2019, it was written by Londra, Jairo Bascope, Cristian Salazar and Ovy on the Drums, who also produced the song.

== Background and composition ==
On March 20, 2019, Londra posted on his social media the first teaser for "Tal Vez", the seventh single from his debut album, announcing that the song's release would be on April 3, 2019.

"Tal Vez" was written by Londra and Ovy on the Drums, who also produced it. It is described as a reggaeton song that uses elements of latin trap. The lyrics relate a man's crush on a woman who is very confident and catches all eyes, however, the young man is defined as insecure and that his love seems to be unrequited, inevitably falling into suffering and realizing that perhaps he falls in love too fast.

== Commercial performance ==
In the week of April 20, 2019, the single debuted at No. 7 on Billboard Argentina Hot 100. The following week, it climbed up the chart to No. 6 and in the third week it climbed to the number 3. "Tal Vez" peaked when it ranked at number 2 on the chart during the week of May 18, 2019. Following the release of her debut album Homerun on May 23, 2019, the single received a gold single certification from the Cámara Argentina de Productores de Fonogramas y Videogramas (CAPIF).

In Spain, "Tal Vez" made its debut at position 17 on the music hits chart prepared by PROMUSICAE (Productores de Música de España). The single peaked on the chart at number 4 and was certified triple platinum. At the end of 2019, according to Billboard Argentina, "Tal Vez" was the ninth most played song in Argentina.

== Accolades ==
Awards and nominations for "Tal Vez"
Year	Organization	Award	Result	Ref(s)
2019	Quiero Awards	Best Male Artist Video	Nominated	

== Music video ==
The music video was directed and produced by EME Creative. In the video, Londra plays a boy who dresses up as a lion to represent the mascot of a supermarket. During his day, he falls in love with a customer, played by Julieta Bartolomé, who comes in to shop and seeks his attention with the help of her co-workers. "Tal Vez" became Londra's third music video to reach one billion views on YouTube.

== Charts ==
=== Weekly charts ===
Chart (2018–2019)	Peak position
Argentina (Argentina Hot 100)	2
Chile (Monitor Latino)	17
Colombia (National-Report)	36
Costa Rica (FONOTICA)	6
Ecuador (Monitor Latino)	4
Guatemala (Monitor Latino)	11
Latin America (Monitor Latino)	9
Mexico (Billboard Mexican Airplay)	13
Panama (PRODUCE)	32
Paraguay (Monitor Latino)	1
Paraguay (SGP)	57
Peru (Monitor Latino)	2
Puerto Rico Urban (Monitor Latino)	15
Spain (Promusicae)	4
Uruguay (Monitor Latino)	6
US Hot Latin Songs (Billboard)	43
Venezuela Urban (Monitor Latino)	18

=== Year-end charts ===
Chart (2019)	Position
Argentina Airplay (Monitor Latino)	13
Chile Airplay (Monitor Latino)	83
Paraguay (SGP)	57
Spain (PROMUSICAE)	25

== Certifications ==
Region	Certification	Certified units/sales
Argentina (CAPIF)	Gold	10,000^{‡}
Spain (Promusicae)	4× Platinum	160,000^{‡}
Streaming
Chile (PROFOVI)	Platinum	36,000,000
^{‡} Sales+streaming figures based on certification alone.

== Release history ==
Release dates and formats for "Tal Vez"
Region	Date	Format	Label(s)	Ref.
Various	April 3, 2019	Digital download; streaming	Big Ligas; Warner	

== See also ==
- List of Billboard Argentina Hot 100 top-ten singles in 2019
