= Dímelo (Paulo Londra song) =

Single by Paulo Londra

from the album Homerun
- Language: Spanish
- English title: "Tell Me"
- Released: May 7, 2018
- Genre: Latin trap
- Length: 3:32
- Label: Big Ligas; Warner
- Songwriters: Paulo Londra; Daniel Echavarría Oviedo; Cristian Salazar
- Producer: Ovy on the Drums

Paulo Londra singles chronology
"Te Amo" (2018)	"Dímelo" (2018)	"Chica Paranormal" (2018)

Music video
- "Dímelo" on YouTube

"Dímelo" is a song by Argentine rapper and singer Paulo Londra. It was released on May 7, 2018, through Big Ligas and Warner Music Latina, as the third single from his debut studio album, Homerun (2019). Londra wrote the song with the producer Ovy on the Drums and Cristian Salazar also receiving credits for writing.

== Background and composition ==
After the commercial success of the single "Te Amo" with the Colombian boy-band Piso 21, Londra quickly announced on his social media the release of a new song titled "Dímelo". On April 26, 2018, the artist revealed that the single would be released on May 7. A few days before the release, Paulo premiered a preview of what the song would be on his YouTube channel.

The track was written by Londra and produced by Ovy on The Drums. The song is entirely composed over a latin trap beat, presenting a variety in its sound, where the influence of caribbean rhythms stands out.

== Accolades ==
Awards and nominations for "Dímelo"
Year	Organization	Award	Result	Ref(s)
2019	Carlos Gardel Awards	Best Urban / Trap Song	Nominated	

== Music video ==
The music video was directed by Jonathan Quintero and starred Colombian model Daniela Arango, who portrays a young woman going through a critical moment in her relationship with her partner. In its first 24 hours, the song managed to reach three million views on YouTube, placing the video in the top position of the most-watched content in Argentina. In July 2018, two months after its release, the video reached 95 million views. By the end of that year, in December, "Dímelo" reached the milestone of 165 million views on the platform, turning the single into one of Londra's biggest hits of that year.

== Credits and personnel ==
Credits are adapted from Genius.

- Paulo Londra – songwriter, vocals
- Daniel Echavarría Oviedo – songwriter, engineering, musical production
- Cristian Salazar – songwriter
- Wain – engineering

== Charts ==
Chart performance for "Dímelo"
Chart (2018)	Peak position
Argentina Digital Songs (CAPIF)	5
Argentina National (Monitor Latino)	12
Paraguay (Monitor Latino)	9
Panama (PRODUCE)	734
Peru (UNIMPRO)	556

== Certifications ==
Certifications for "Forever Alone"
Region	Certification	Certified units/sales
Argentina (CAPIF)	Platinum	20,000^{‡}
^{‡} Sales+streaming figures based on certification alone.

== Release history ==
Release dates and formats for "Dímelo"
Region	Date	Version	Label	Ref.
Various	May 7, 2018	Digital download; streaming	Big Ligas; Warner	
