= Nothing on You (Ed Sheeran song) =

2019 song by Ed Sheeran featuring Paulo Londra and Dave

Promotional single by Ed Sheeran featuring Paulo Londra and Dave

from the album No.6 Collaborations Project
- Language: English; Spanish
- Released: 12 July 2019
- Length: 3:20
- Label: Asylum; Atlantic
- Songwriters: Ed Sheeran; Paulo Londra; David Omoregie; Fred Gibson
- Producers: Fred Gibson; Max Borghetti; Sam Tsang

Music video
- "Nothing on You" on YouTube

"Nothing on You" is a song recorded by English singer-songwriter Ed Sheeran featuring Argentine rapper Paulo Londra and English rapper Dave from the former's compilation album, No.6 Collaborations Project (2019). It was released as a promotional single through Asylum and Atlantic Records on 12 July 2019. The song was written by Sheeran, Londra, Dave, and Fred Gibson, and produced by Gibson, Max Borghetti and Sam Tsang.

== Background ==
Sheeran announced the collaboration, as well as the entire album's tracklist, on 18 June 2019 via Instagram. Immediately following Sheeran's announcement, Londra shared the "crazy surprise" with his fans on social media, saying: "All I can say at this moment is that dreams do come true and thank you, Ed Sheeran, for giving me the opportunity to do what I do on his album."

As to how the collaboration came together, Londra revealed to Billboard that the album was already "closed", which meant the likelihood that a collaboration between Sheeran and him could appear on it was slim, but it ended up coming together just in time. For Londra, one of the main purposes of this collaboration was to inspire other Latin artists to dream big.

== Composition ==
The track starts with a melodic line of a synthesizer that is repeated during the three-minutes twenty-seconds of the song, acting as its leitmotif. After its first verse and chorus, with Sheeran commanding, Londra attacks the beat. Its entrance to the melodic base denotes the work of a professional rapper. Londra's flow is closed by Dave for Sheeran, with his melodic cadence, to put an end to the song.

== Critical reception ==
Jota Ayerza of Billboard Argentina highlighted Londra's performance, saying: "It seems like if the Córdoba-born singer has been preparing for this moment since his days as freestyler, without even knowing it."

== Music video ==
The accompanying music video for "Nothing on You" was released on 8 August 2019.

== Charts ==
=== Weekly charts ===
Chart (2019)	Peak position
Argentina (Argentina Hot 100)	19
Argentina Airplay (Monitor Latino)	5
Australia (ARIA)	65
Canada Hot 100 (Billboard)	85
Colombia (National-Report)	90
Czech Republic Singles Digital (ČNS IFPI)	66
Ecuador (National-Report)	89
Mexico (Billboard Mexican Airplay)	48
Slovakia Singles Digital (ČNS IFPI)	50
Spain (PROMUSICAE)	68
Sweden Heatseeker (Sverigetopplistan)	6
UK Hip Hop/R&B (OCC)	35
UK Audio Streaming (OCC)	24

=== Year-end charts ===
Chart (2019)	Position
Argentina (Monitor Latino)	51

== Certifications ==
Region	Certification	Certified units/sales
Argentina (CAPIF)	Platinum	20,000^{*}
Canada (Music Canada)	Gold	40,000^{‡}
United Kingdom (BPI)	Silver	200,000^{‡}
^{*} Sales figures based on certification alone.^{‡} Sales+streaming figures based on certification alone.
