= List of Billboard Argentina Hot 100 number-one singles of 2018 =

The Billboard Argentina Hot 100 is a chart that ranks the best-performing songs in the Argentina. Its data, published by Billboard Argentina magazine and compiled by Nielsen SoundScan and BMAT/Vericast, is based collectively on each song's weekly physical and digital sales, as well as the amount of airplay received on Argentine radio stations and TV and streaming on online digital music outlets.

== Chart history ==
No.	Issue date	Song	Artist(s)	Ref.
1	October 14	"Cuando Te Besé"	Becky G and Paulo Londra	
2	October 21	"Me Vas a Extrañar"	Damas Gratis featuring Viru Kumbieron	
2	October 28	"Me Vas a Extrañar"	Damas Gratis featuring Viru Kumbieron	
3	November 4	"Taki Taki"	DJ Snake featuring Selena Gomez, Ozuna and Cardi B	
3	November 11	"Taki Taki"	DJ Snake featuring Selena Gomez, Ozuna and Cardi B	
3	November 18	"Taki Taki"	DJ Snake featuring Selena Gomez, Ozuna and Cardi B	
3	November 25	"Taki Taki"	DJ Snake featuring Selena Gomez, Ozuna and Cardi B	
3	December 2	"Taki Taki"	DJ Snake featuring Selena Gomez, Ozuna and Cardi B	
4	December 9	"Adán y Eva"	Paulo Londra	
4	December 16	"Adán y Eva"	Paulo Londra	
4	December 23	"Adán y Eva"	Paulo Londra	
4	December 30	"Adán y Eva"	Paulo Londra	

== See also ==
- List of number-one hits of 2018 (Argentina)
- List of Billboard Argentina Hot 100 top-ten singles in 2018
- List of Billboard Argentina Hot 100 number-one singles of 2019
