= Chica Paranormal =

Single by Paulo Londra

from the album Homerun
- Language: Spanish
- English title: "Paranormal Girl"
- Released: July 23, 2018
- Genre: Latin trap
- Length: 3:41
- Label: Big Ligas; Warner
- Songwriters: Paulo Londra; Daniel Echavarría Oviedo; Cristian Salazar
- Producer: Ovy on the Drums

Paulo Londra singles chronology
"Dímelo" (2018)	"Chica Paranormal" (2018)	"Cuando Te Besé" (2018)

Music video
- "Chica Paranormal" on YouTube

"Chica Paranormal" is a song by Argentine rapper and singer Paulo Londra, released through Big Ligas and Warner Music Latina on July 23, 2018, as the fourth single from his debut studio album, Homerun (2019). It was written by Londra and produced by Ovy on the Drums.

== Background and composition ==
On July 15, 2018, Londra uploaded a video to Instagram, where he showcased a musical snippet along with the description "Paranormal, what's coming", hinting at the title of his new song. On July 21, he announced "Chica Paranormal" as the next single of his debut studio album and revealed its cover art and release date, July 23.

"Chica Paranormal" is a latin trap song composed by Londra, in which he expresses his feelings towards a girl who is dangerous to fall in love and establish a romantic relationship with her.

== Critical reception ==
Billboard Argentina's Martín Sanzano placed "Chica Paranormal" at the top spot of the highlights in Argentine trap music of the year 2018. About the song and Londra, he said "that it's just an example of his ability to create instant hits", [...] and perhaps it's the best snippet to delve into his sound, into that flow that seems to glide over slow yet danceable beats".

== Commercial performance ==
The song debuted at number 55 on the Billboard Argentina Hot 100, where it remained for six weeks. The single received platinum certification for its high sales in Argentina. In Spain, "Chica paranormal" reached the 99th position on the Top 100 Songs chart. The single was one of the most played trap songs during the years 2018 and 2019 in Latin America. The single put Londra on the international music radar.

== Accolades ==
Awards and nominations for "Chica Paranormal"
Year	Organization	Award	Result	Ref(s)
2019	Carlos Gardel Awards	Best Urban / Trap Song	Nominated	

== Music video ==
The music video was premiered on July 23, 2018, on Londra's official YouTube channel. It was directed by Jonathan Quintero, filmed in Colombia, and features the singer with his friends entering a haunted house. The footage is captured using a green night vision camera, drawing inspiration from the American supernatural horror film Paranormal Activity (2007).

== Credits and personnel ==
Credits are adapted from Genius.

- Paulo Londra – songwriter, vocals
- Daniel Echavarría Oviedo – songwriter, engineering, musical production
- Cristian Salazar – songwriter
- Mosty – engineering

== Charts ==
=== Weekly charts ===
Chart performance for "Chica Paranormal"
Chart (2018)	Peak position
Argentina Hot 100 (Billboard)	55
Argentina National (Monitor Latino)	12
Costa Rica Urban (Monitor Latino)	17
Peru (UNIMPRO)	134
Spain (Promusicae)	99

2022 weekly chart performance for "Chica Paranormal"
Chart (2022)	Peak position
Paraguay (SGP)	54

=== Monthly charts ===
Monthly chart performance for "Chica Paranormal"
Chart (2019)	Peak position
Argentina Digital Songs (CAPIF)	5
Panama (PRODUCE)	216

== Certifications ==
Certifications for "Chica Paranormal"
Region	Certification	Certified units/sales
Argentina (CAPIF)	Platinum	20,000^{‡}
Spain (Promusicae)	Platinum	60,000^{‡}
^{‡} Sales+streaming figures based on certification alone.

== Release history ==
Release dates and formats for "Chica Paranormal"
Region	Date	Version	Label	Ref.
Various	July 23, 2018	Digital download; streaming	Big Ligas; Warner	
