= Condenado Para el Millón =

Single by Paulo Londra

from the album Homerun
- Language: Spanish
- English title: "Condemned to a Million"
- Released: December 4, 2017
- Genre: Latin trap
- Length: 3:42
- Label: Big Ligas
- Songwriters: Paulo Londra; Daniel Echavarría Oviedo; Cristian Salazar
- Producer: Ovy on the Drums

Paulo Londra singles chronology
"Cámara Lenta" (2017)	"Condenado Para el Millón" (2017)	"Nena Maldición" (2018)

Music video
- "Condenado Para el Millón" on YouTube

"Condenado Para el Millón" is a song by Argentine rapper and singer Paulo Londra. It was released on December 4, 2017, through Big Ligas as the first single from Londra's debut studio album, Homerun (2019). The song was the first project Londra worked on with Ovy on the Drums and marked his first commercial success outside of Argentina.

== Background and composition ==
During 2017, Londra independently released several songs that received a positive commercial reception in Argentina, leading him to be contacted, through a Colombian YouTuber, by music producer Ovy on the Drums to start working together. In October 2017, Londra traveled to Colombia, where he met the Big Ligas team and composed the song "Condenado Para el Millón" at Ovy on the Drums' house, where they set up and soundproofed the walls to record the song.

== Critical reception ==
According to La Voz del Interior, in the performance of the song, "Londra begins to display a more confident and virtuosic flow", while the musical foundation of the single has "a style that easily varies in tempo", representing "a more produced music" compared to his previous works.

== Credits and personnel ==
Credits are adapted from Genius.

- Paulo Londra – songwriter, vocals
- Daniel Echavarría Oviedo – songwriter, engineering, musical production
- Cristian Salazar – songwriter
- Wain – engineering

== Charts ==
Chart performance for "Condenado Para el Millón"
Chart (2021)	Peak position
Peru (UNIMPRO)	463

== Certifications ==
Certifications for "Condenado Para el Millón"
Region	Certification	Certified units/sales
Argentina (CAPIF)	Platinum	20,000^{‡}
^{‡} Sales+streaming figures based on certification alone.

== Release history ==
Release dates and formats for "Condenado Para el Millón"
Region	Date	Version	Label	Ref.
Various	December 4, 2017	Digital download; streaming	Big Ligas	
