= Lo Nuestro Award for Album of the Year =

American annual award for Latin music

- Awarded for: quality vocal or instrumental recorded albums
- Country: United States
- Presented by: Univision
- First award: 2016
- Currently held by: Un Verano Sin Ti by Bad Bunny (2023)
- Website: univision.com/premio-lo-nuestro

The Lo Nuestro Award for Album of the Year is an honor presented annually since 2016 by the American television network Univision at the Lo Nuestro Awards. The award was established to recognize the quality of recorded vocal or instrumental albums of Latin music. Nominees and winners are selected based on performance on the Billboard Latin music charts and social media polls, winners are selected via online voting. The trophy awarded is in the shape of a treble clef.

Throughout its history, the Lo Nuestro Awards originally always awarded albums by musical genre, but without any general category. The Album of the Year category was first added in 2016 and has been awarded to date with the exception of 2018 and 2019. The 30th ceremony was held in 2018, and a special program was made instead of voteable categories, while in 2019 it was decided to omit all album categories.

== Winners and nominees ==
Year	Winner(s)	Nominees	Ref.
2016	Hoy Más Fuerte – Gerardo Ortíz	Los Dúo (Deluxe Edition) – Juan Gabriel; Todo Tiene Su Hora – Juan Luis Guerra; Love & Sex – Plan B	
2017	Visualízate – Gente de Zona	Visionary – Farruko; Amor Supremo – Carla Morrison; Recuerden Mi Estilo – Los Plebes del Rancho de Ariel Camacho	
2020	Oasis – J Balvin and Bad Bunny	11:11 – Maluma; Ahora – Christian Nodal; Ahora – Reik; Fantasía – Sebastián Yatra; Homerun – Paulo Londra; Ocean – Karol G; Opus – Marc Anthony; Simplemente Gracias – Calibre 50; Utopía – Romeo Santos	
2021	YHLQMDLG – Bad Bunny	Alter Ego – Prince Royce; AYAYAY! – Christian Nodal; Colores – J Balvin; De Buenos Aires Para el Mundo – Los Ángeles Azules; Guárdame Esta Noche – El Fantasma; Hecho en México – Alejandro Fernández; Más Caro Que Ayer – Gerardo Ortíz; Más futuro que pasado – Juanes; Papi Juancho – Maluma	
2022	El Último Tour Del Mundo – Bad Bunny	Entre Mar y Palmeras (Live) – Juan Luis Guerra; Esta Vida Es Muy Bonita – Banda El Recodo de Cruz Lizárraga; Jose – J Balvin; KG0516 – Karol G; Leyendas – Carlos Rivera; Mexicana Enamorada – Ángela Aguilar; Mis Manos – Camilo; Utopía Live From Metlife Stadium – Romeo Santos; Vamos Bien – Calibre 50	
2023	Un Verano Sin Ti – Bad Bunny	Cumbiana II – Carlos Vives; De Adentro Pa Afuera – Camilo; Dharma – Sebastián Yatra; Esquemas – Becky G; Forajido EP1 – Christian Nodal; Legendaddy – Daddy Yankee; Me Siento a Todo Dar – Banda Los Recoditos; Motomami – Rosalía; Pa'llá Voy – Marc Anthony	

== See also ==
- Latin Grammy Award for Album of the Year
- Billboard Latin Music Award for Top Latin Album of the Year
