= 21st Annual Premios Gardel =

2019 Argentine music awards ceremony

- Date: May 14, 2019
- Location: Ángel Bustelo Auditorium, Mendoza, Argentina
- Hosted by: Iván de Pineda

Highlights
- Most awards: Lali (3); Escalandrum (3)
- Most nominations: Paulo Londra (7)

Television/radio coverage
- Network: TNT Latin America

The 21st Annual Premios Gardel ceremony were held on May 14, 2019. The TNT Latin America networks broadcast the show live from the Ángel Bustelo Auditorium in Mendoza. It was the first time that the ceremony was held outside Buenos Aires. The ceremony recognized the best recordings, compositions, and artists of the eligibility year, which ran from January 1, 2016 to January 31, 2016. The nominations were announced on April 16, 2019 at the Néstor Kirchner Cultural Centre in Buenos Aires.

The ceremony was hosted by Argentina model, actor and TV host Iván de Pineda. The pre-telecast ceremony was held prior to the main event and was hosted by Gabriela Radice and Luis Serrano.

Paulo Londra received the most nominations, with seven, followed by Abel Pintos and Babasónicos, with five each. Lali and Escalandrum tied for the most wins of the night with three each.

== Performers ==
Artist(s)	Song(s)
Victor Heredia; Luciana Jury; Teresa Parodi; Wos	Tribute to Mercedes Sosa: "Gracias a la Vida" "Como un pájaro libre" "Todo cambia"
Lidia Borda; Fernando Barrientos; Salvapantallas; Kódigo	Tribute to Serú Girán: "San Francisco y el Lobo" "Noche de Perros" "Viernes 3 AM" "La grasa de las capitales"
Elena Roger; Ligia Piro; Sol Pereyra; Silvina Moreno	Grandes Mujeres de la Música Argentina: "Serenata para la tierra de uno" "Puerto Pollensa" "Palmas Azules" "Esa Musiquita"
Anitta; Miss Bolivia; Ángela Torres; Virginia Innocenti	"Atención"
Agus Padilla; FMK; Dakillah; Escalandrum	La Fuerza del Rock Nacional: "Ciudad de pobres corazones" "Cerca de la revolución" "De Música Ligera"
Lali; Mono; Los Tekis; Cucho Parisi	A Toda Fiesta: "Por cuatro días locos" "Fuiste" "¿Quién se ha tomado todo el vino?" "No Quiero Trabajar"

== Nominees and winners ==
Nominees were taken from the Gardel Awards website. Winners are listed in bold.

=== General ===
Album of the Year

- **Prender un Fuego – Marilina Bertoldi**
- Cargar La Suerte – Andrés Calamaro
- Discutible – Babasónicos
- Studio 2 – Escalandrum
- Fiesta Nacional (MTV Unplugged) – Los Auténticos Decadentes

Song of the Year

- **"Sin Querer Queriendo" – Lali featuring Mau y Ricky**
- "Verdades Afiladas" – Andrés Calamaro
- "La Pregunta" – Babasónicos
- "Vámonos de Viaje" – Bandalos Chinos
- "Fumar de día" – Marilina Bertoldi

Record of the Year

- **Studio 2 – Escalandrum**
  - **Escalandrum & Horacio Sarria, producers; Facundo Rodríguez, engineer**
- Discutible – Babasónicos
  - Babasónicos & Gustavo Iglesias, producers; Gustavo Iglesias & Greg Calbi, engineers
- "Amor Ausente (En Vivo)" – Eruca Sativa & Abel Pintos
  - Eruca Sativa, producer; Gabriel Pedernera, engineer
- Best Seller – Juan Ingaramo
  - Geiser, producer; Nico Cotton & Rafael Arcaute, engineer
- Sonido Subtropical – La Delio Valdez
  - Andrés Mayo, Mariano Agustín Fernández & Delio Valdez, producers; Mariano Agustín Fernández engineer

Best New Artist

- Instanto – Destino San Javier
- BACH – Bandalos Chinos
- Teoría Espacial – Barbi Recanati
- Conociendo Rusia – Conociendo Rusia
- Clásico – Hipnótica
- Nos Vamos a Morir de Hacer Estrategias de Amor – Los Rusos Hijos de Puta
- Instanto – Destino San Javier
- Escenas de La Nada Mirar – Noelia Sinkunas
- "Adán y Eva" – Paulo Londra
- SMS – Salvapantallas

Collaboration of the Year

- **"Amor Ausente (En Vivo)" – Eruca Sativa & Abel Pintos**
- "No Es No" – Axel & Soledad
- "Cuando Te Besé" – Becky G & Paulo Londra
- "Un Poquito" – Diego Torres & Carlos Vives
- "Amor (En Vivo)" – Los Auténticos Decadentes featuring Mon Laferte

Best Singer-Songwriter Album

- **Constelaciones en el Luna Park (En Vivo) – Lisandro Aristimuño**
- 40 Años – Leo Maslíah
- Instrucciones para Madurar – Roque Narvaja
- Carrousel – Silvina Garré
- La Huella en el Cemento – Sofía Viola

=== Pop ===
Best Female Pop Album

- **Brava – Lali**
- Popular – Maria Campos
- Un Té de Tilo Por Favor – Natalie Pérez
- Quiero Volver – TINI
- Solo Sé – Victoria Bernardi

Best Male Pop Album

- **La Familia Festeja Fuerte (En Vivo Estadio River Plate) – Abel Pintos**
- Dada – Soy Rada and the Colibriquis
- El Otro – Chano
- La Bestia de la Energía – Mauro Conforti & La Vida Marciana

Best Pop Group Album

- **BACH – Bandalos Chinos**
- Clásico – Hipnótica
- Un Regulo Tuyo – Rayos Laser
- SMS – Salvapantallas
- Criaturas – Ser

=== Rock ===
Best Female Rock Album

- **Prender un Fuego – Marilina Bertoldi**
- Del Otro Lado – Bié
- La Génesis – Hilda Lizarazu
- Heidi – Militta Bora
- Umbral – Noe Terceros

Best Male Rock Album

- **Cargar la suerte – Andrés Calamaro**
- Naranja Persa 2 – Ciro y los Persas
- El Vuelo del Dragon, Pt. 1 – Palo Pandolfo
- Sombras en el cielo – Raúl Porchetto
- Fervor – Rocco Posca

Best Rock Group Album

- **Haciendo Cosas Raras – Divididos**
- Discutible – Babasónicos
- 20 Años Celebrando – La Beriso
- Fiesta Nacional (MTV Unplugged) – Los Auténticos Decadentes
- Vanthra – Vanthra

Best Hard Rock/Punk Album

- **Una Razón para Seguir – A.N.I.M.A.L.**
- Teoría del Caos – Deja Vu
- Gritando Verdades – Horcas
- Ruta Hotel – Playa Nudista
- Sentimiento – Sonia

=== Urban/Trap ===
Best Urban/Trap Song or Album

- **"Adán y Eva" – Paulo Londra**
- "Cuando Te Besé" – Becky G & Paulo Londra
- "Oro Negro" – Dakillah
- "Si Te Sentis Sola" – Duki
- Tres Mil Millones de Años Luz – Emanero
- En Espiral – Lo' Pibitos
- "Fama de Puta" – Naomi Preizler
- "Chica Paranormal" – Paulo Londra
- "Dímelo" – Paulo Londra
- "Me Doy Cuenta" – Valen Etchegoyen

Best Urban/Trap Collaboration

- **"Cuando Te Besé" – Becky G & Paulo Londra**
- "Sin Culpa" – Duki featuring DrefQuila
- "Tres Mil Millones de Años Luz" – Emanero featuring Sony
- "De Gira" – Naomi Preizler & Under MC
- "Antireversa" – Sol Pereyra & Mula

=== Tango ===
Best Female Tango Album

- **Puñal de sombra – Lidia Borda**
- Azsulado – Alicia Vignola
- En la boca del león – Eva Fiori Orquesta
- Martingala – Julieta Laso
- Argentígena – María Laura Antonelli

Best Male Tango Album

- **Tango Cosmopolita – Omar Mollo**
- Todo es Amor – Cristian Chinellato
- Roto – Enrique Campos
- Pasional – Jorge Vazquez
- 70 Años de Tango – Roberto Siri

=== Cuarteto ===
Best Cuarteto Album

- **En Vivo con Amigos – Ulises Bueno**
- Estamos Todos de Fiesta – Cuarteto Retro
- 25 – Damián Córdoba
- Vigencia – Negro Videla
- Éxitos de Oro – Nolberto al k la

Best Cuarteto Group Album

- **Obsesión – La Barra**
- 20 Años – La Banda al Rojo Vivo
- Animate! – Q' Lokura
- Aquellas Canciones Inolvidables – Sabroso

=== Tropical ===
Best Female Tropical Album

- **La Voz de los Barrios – Rocío Quiroz**
- Inigualable – Dalila
- No Te Confundas – Eugenia Quevedo
- #ATR – Jackita
- Dos Infieles – Lumila

Best Male Tropical Album

- **En el Gran Rex (En Vivo) – Néstor En Bloque**
- En Vivo – Daniel Cardozo
- Barrios de Mi Tierra (Canciones de Rubén Blades) – Iván Barrios
- Entre Amantes y Enamorados – Mario Luis
- Íntimo (En Vivo) – Rodrigo Tapari

Best Tropical Group Album

- **Sonido Subtropical – La Delio Valdez**
- G.Y.R.D.A. – Girda y los del Alba
- ¡Echale Soda! – Orquesta Plazoleta All Stars
- La Vuelta – Roberto Edgar Volcán
- Viru Kumbieron – Viru Kumbieron

=== Folk ===
Best Female Folklore Album

- **Jallalla – Micaela Chauque**
- Poder Decir – Ceci Mendez
- Canto Soy – Eli Fernández
- Jaaukanigás – Patricia Gómez
- Convicción – Rocío Araujo

Best Male Folklore Album

- **Violeta Azul – Abi González**
- Canto a Rosario – Enrique Llopis
- A Fin de Cuentas (En Vivo) – Facundo Saravia
- Mi Cantar – Jorge Rojas
- Coplas del Violinero – Néstor Garnica

Best Folklore Group Album

- **Patio – Juan Quintero, Santiago Segret & Andrés Pilar**
- Instanto – Destino San Javier
- Un lugar antes de la lluvia – La Llave
- Atemporales – Las Hermanas Atemporales
- Perspectiva Interior – Los Chaza

=== Alternative ===
Best Alternative Pop Album

- Vanthra – Vanthra
- Animal – Ainda Dúo
- Conociendo Rusia – Conociendo Rusia
- Best Seller – Juan Ingaramo
- Nene Mimado – Nahuel Briones

Best Alternative Rock Album

- **Matrioska – Mariana Bianchini**
- Historias de Pescadores y Ladrones de La Pampa Argentina – Gabo Ferro and Sergio CH
- 20 Años: El Show Más Feliz del Mundo (En Vivo) – Los Caligaris
- Vanthra – Vanthra
- Unisex – Zerokill

Best Alternative Folklore Album

- **Trino – Aca Seca**
- Canciones de Tucumán a Rosario – Leopoldo Deza & Litto Nebbia
- Canción Sobre Canción – Liliana Herrero
- Ese Amigo del Alma: 30 Años (En Vivo) – Lito Vitale Quinteto
- Tierra Sin Mal – Silvia Iriondo

=== Electronic ===
Best Electronic Music Album

- **Universo Paralelo – Las Rositas**
- Universal – Brijow
- Superbrillantes – Flavio Etcheto
- Sangre o Saliva – Lola Granillo
- Rapsodia – Mistol Team

=== Romantic/Melodic ===
Best Romantic/Melodic Album

- **Porque Yo Te Amo – Gerónimo Rauch**
- Con Buena Compañía – Dany Martin
- Celebrando a una Leyenda (En Vivo) – Leo Dan
- Heliotrópico – Manuel Moreira
- Románticos 60's – Palito Ortega

=== Music for Visual Media ===
Best Cinema/Television Soundtrack Album

- **Notas de Paso 2 – Ernesto Snajer**
- Camino Sinuoso – Fito Páez
- Caminante del Amor – Leo Sujatovich & Mateo Sujatovich
- Un Gallo para Esculapio – Pablo Borghi
- El Potro, Lo Mejor del Amor – Rodrigo Romero

=== Reggae/Ska ===
Best Reggae/Ska Album

- **Caminarás Caminos – Dread Mar I**
- Neighborhood Rules – Hugo Lobo
- Amanecido – Leonchalon
- Runfla Calavera – Mamita Peyote
- Semillas de Paz – Vero y Pablo

=== Chamamé ===
Best Chamamé Album

- **Cocomarola en Guitarras – Rudi Flores y Las guitarras correntinas**
- Grandes Éxitos – Ernestito Montiel
- Ñande Poetas: Homenaje a Luis Landriscina – Juan Pablo Barebrán & Tajy
- En Dos Hileras – Julio Ramírez
- Franco – Lucas Monzón

=== Jazz ===
Best Jazz Album

- **Studio 2 – Escalandrum**
- Nude – Inés Estévez
- Lentes – Juan Cruz de Urquiza
- Love – Ligia Piro
- Danza – Mariano Otero

=== Classical ===
Best Classical Album

- **Horacio Lavandera - Ludwig van Beethoven – Horacio Lavandera**
- Sola Flauta Sola – Beatriz Plana
- Piezas para Piano – Diana Lopszyc & Saúl Cosentino
- Schubert: Mass No. 2 in G Major, D.167 – Estudio Coral de Buenos Aires
- Bajo Templado – Sebastián Tozzola & Anaïs Crestin

Best Instrumental Tango Orchestra Album

- **Ahora y Siempre – Orquesta Típica Fernández Fierro**
- Atípico – Bernardo Monk Orquesta
- Tanguera – Diego Schissi Quinteto
- Tangos de la posverdad – Juan Pablo Navarro Sexteto
- Cruces Urbanos – Quinteto Negro La Boca

=== World Music ===
Best Instrumental/Fusion/World Music Album

- **Adivino del Tiempo – Marcelo Torres**
- Posdata – Ensamble Chancho a Cuerda
- Todos los Nombres, Todos los Cielos – Ignacio Montoya Carlotto
- En la montaña – Obi Homer

=== Children ===
Best Children's Album

- **Magia todo el día – Luis Pescetti y amigos**
- Firmamento – Dúo Karma
- Minimalitos – Magdalena Fleitas
- Barcos y Mariposas (Vol. 5) – Mariana Baggio
- Simona (Music from the TV Series) – Simona cast

=== Historical ===
Best Catalog Collection

- **Satélite Cerati – Gustavo Cerati**
- El Gusanito en Persona – Jorge de la Vega
- Fuiste Mía un Verano (Edición 50 Aniversario) – Leonardo Favio
- Ave Fenix 2 – Lito Vitale
- 80 años - Jazztaríaenbaterita – Néstor Astarita

=== Recording Engineering ===
Recording Engineer of the Year

- **Studio 2 – Escalandrum**
  - **Facundo Rodríguez, engineer**
- Best Seller – Juan Ingaramo
  - Nico Cotton, engineer
- Sonido Subtropical – La Delio Valdez
  - Mariano Agustín Fernández, engineer
- Prender un Fuego – Marilina Bertoldi
  - Brian Taylor, engineer
- "Physical" – Octafonic
  - Hector Castillo & Luciano Lucerna, engineers

=== Music Video/DVD ===
Best Music Video

- **"Paren de Matarnos" – Miss Bolivia**
- "La Pregunta" – Babasónicos
- "Amor Ausente (En Vivo)" – Eruca Sativa & Abel Pintos
- "La Espesura" – Paula Maffía
- "Chica Feliz" – Ser

Best DVD

- **Fiesta Nacional (MTV Unplugged) – Los Auténticos Decadentes**
  - **Fernando Emliozzi, director**
- La Familia Festeja Fuerte – Abel Pintos
  - Diego Alvarez, director
- Coti Sorokin Y Los Brillantes En El Teatro Colón (Live At Teatro Colón / 2018) – Coti
  - Coti Sorokin & Agustina Tafet, directors
- El Vuelo del Dragon, Pt. 1 – Palo Pandolfo
  - Norberto Hegoburu, director

=== Design ===
Best Cover Design

- **Brava – Lali**
  - **Molokid, graphic designer**
- Satélite Cerati – Gustavo Cerati
  - Alejandro Ros, graphic designer
- Best Seller – Juan Ingaramo
  - Franco Ferrari, graphic designer
- Fuego Artificial – Las Ligas Menores
  - Anabella Cartolano, graphic designer
- Un Té de Tilo Por Favor – Natalie Pérez
  - Gastón Garriga Lacaze, graphic designer

=== Archival Concept ===
Best Archival Concept Album

- **Canción Sobre Canción – Liliana Herrero**
  - **Carlos Villalba, Mariana Isla & Nahuel Carfi, executive producers**
- Coti Sorokin Y Los Brillantes En El Teatro Colón (Live At Teatro Colón / 2018) – Coti
  - Coti Sorokin, executive producer
- Línea de tiempo – Ensamble Real Book Argentina
  - Esteban Sehinkman, executive producer
- Ave Fenix 2 – Lito Vitale
  - Lito Vitale, executive producer
- En la Luna – Virginia Innocenti
  - Virginia Innocenti & Sergio Zabala, executive producers

== Multiple nominations and awards ==
The following received multiple nominations:

Seven:

- Paulo Londra

Five:

- Babasónicos
- Abel Pintos

Four:

- Los Auténticos Decadentes
- Escalandrum
- Juan Ingaramo
- Marilina Bertoldi

Three:

- Bandalos Chinos
- Becky G
- Andrés Calamaro
- Eruca Sativa
- La Delio Valdez
- Lali

Two:

- Gustavo Cerati
- Coti
- Destino San Javier
- Duki
- Emanero
- Liliana Herrero
- Hipnótica
- Conociendo Rusia
- Palo Pandolfo
- Natalie Pérez
- Naomi Preizler
- Salvapantallas
- Ser
- Vanthra
- Lito Vitale

The following received multiple awards:

Three:

- Lali
- Escalandrum

Two:

- Abel Pintos
- Marilina Bertoldi
- Paulo Londra
