= Te Amo (Piso 21 and Paulo Londra song) =

Single by Piso 21 and Paulo Londra

from the album Ubuntu
- Language: Spanish
- English title: "I Love You"
- Released: 15 March 2018
- Genre: pop latino
- Length: 3:21
- Label: Warner Mexico
- Songwriters: OvyOnTheDrums; Juan David Huertas; David Escobar G.; Juan D. Medina; Pablo Mejía B.; Paulo Londra
- Producers: Ovy on the Drums, AlexisVars

Piso 21 singles chronology
| "Adrenalina" (2017) | "Te Amo" (2018) | "La Vida Sin Ti" (2018) |

Paulo Londra singles chronology
| "Nena Maldición" (2018) | "Te Amo" (2018) | "Dímelo" (2018) |

Music video
- "Te Amo" on YouTube

"Te Amo" (transl. "I Love You") is a song by Colombian band Piso 21 and Argentine rapper Paulo Londra, from their second studio album Ubuntu (2018). It was released on 15 March 2018 by the Mexican division of the Warner Music Group as the album's sixth single. The song was written by its performers, and producer OvyOnTheDrums. The song was a commercial success in Latin America, where it peaked in the top ten of various Monitor Latino charts.

== Music video ==
The music video for "Te Amo" premiered on 15 March 2018 on Piso 21's YouTube account. Filmed in Colombia, it was directed by Paloma Valencia of 36 Grados and has been viewed over 560 million times.

== Track listing ==
Digital download
| No. | Title | Writer(s) | Producer(s) | Length |
|---|---|---|---|---|
| 1. | "Te Amo" (with Paulo Londra) | OvyOnTheDrums; Juan David Huertas; David Escobar G.; Juan D. Medina; Pablo Mejía B.; Paulo Londra | OvyOnTheDrums | 3:21 |

== Charts ==
=== Weekly charts ===
| Chart (2018) | Peak position |
|---|---|
| Argentina (Argentina Hot 100) | 31 |
| Argentina Airplay (Monitor Latino) | 8 |
| Bolivia (Monitor Latino) | 4 |
| Colombia (Monitor Latino) | 9 |
| Colombia (National-Report) | 7 |
| Costa Rica (Monitor Latino) | 16 |
| Ecuador Airplay (Monitor Latino) | 11 |
| Ecuador (National-Report) | 17 |
| El Salvador Pop (Monitor Latino) | 15 |
| Guatemala (Monitor Latino) | 18 |
| Mexico (Billboard Mexican Airplay) | 25 |
| Mexico (Billboard Espanol Airplay) | 9 |
| Mexico Pop (Monitor Latino) | 19 |
| Nicaragua (Monitor Latino) | 18 |
| Panama (PRODUCE) | 143 |
| Panama Urbano (Monitor Latino) | 12 |
| Paraguay (Monitor Latino) | 2 |
| Peru (Monitor Latino) | 5 |
| Spain (PROMUSICAE) | 46 |
| Venezuela (National-Report) | 21 |

=== Year-end charts ===
| Chart (2018) | Position |
|---|---|
| Argentina (Monitor Latino) | 14 |

== Certifications ==
| Region | Certification | Certified units/sales |
|---|---|---|
| Argentina (CAPIF) | Platinum | 20,000^{‡} |
| Colombia (ASINCOL) | Platinum | |
| Spain (Promusicae) | Platinum | 40,000^{‡} |
^{‡} Sales+streaming figures based on certification alone.
