= Bandalos Chinos =

Argentine indie pop band

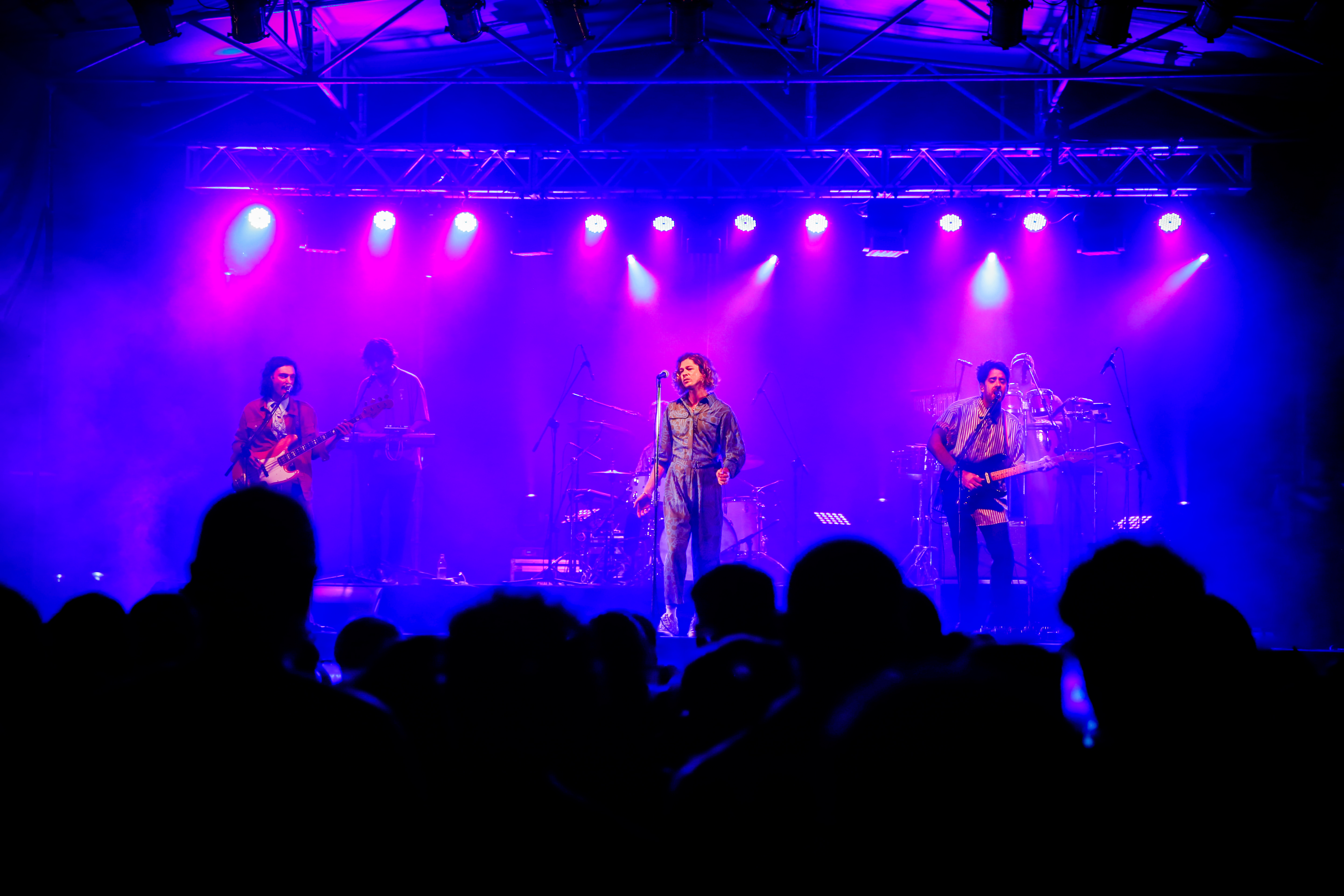

Background information
- Origin: Béccar, Buenos Aires Province, Argentina
- Genres: Indie pop, synthpop
- Years active: 2009-present
- Labels: Discos Crack, Sony Music
- Members: Gregorio "Goyo" Degano; Salvador Colombo; Tomás Verduga; Matías Verduga; Iñaki Colombo; Nicolás Rodríguez del Pozo

Bandalos Chinos is an Argentine indie pop band formed in 2009. The band consists of Gregorio Degano (vocals and synthesizers), Salvador Colombo (synthesizers), Tomás Verduga (guitar and backing vocals), Matías Verduga (drums), Iñaki Colombo (guitars and synthesizers) and Nicolás Rodríguez del Pozo (bass). The band has released five studio albums and has received several awards and nominations including two Gardel Awards and a Latin Grammy Award nomination.

== Career ==
Gregorio "Goyo" Degano and Iñaki Colombo met while attending the same school in San Fernando and started playing music together at 14. After finishing high school in 2009, they formed the band in Béccar, a town in the northern part of the greater Buenos Aires area in Argentina. The name of the band comes from a performance in 2009 where a soundman introduced them as "los chicos" ("the boys" in Spanish) but it was misunderstood as "los chinos", the name would turn into "Banda Los Chinos", later transforming into "Bandalos Chinos". Their debut album Bandalos Chinos, was released in 2012 and was premiered at the Auditorium San Isidro.

Following the release of their first album, they released the EP Nunca Estuve Acá in 2014, consisting of six songs. On January 4, 2017, they released their second EP En el Aire, consisting of five songs. Their second album BACH was released on August 3, 2018, it was recorded at Sonic Ranch Studios in Texas, United States and was produced by Adán Jodorowsky. At the 20th Annual Latin Grammy Awards, the album received nominations for Best Alternative Music Album and Best Engineered Album while at the 21st Annual Gardel Awards, they won Best Pop Group Album.

On October 9, 2020, the band released their third album Paranoia Pop, similar to their previous effort, it was produced by Adán Jodorowsky and was recorded at Sonic Ranch Studios, it also features collaborations with David Aguilar, LOUTA and Tei Shi. To promote the album, the band performed a series of concerts via streaming named Paranoia Pop: El Musical at the Movistar Arena in Buenos Aires. To celebrate the ten year anniversary of the band, they released Feliz Nabibach on December 24, 2020, an album consisting of new versions, demos and live performances of songs from their previous albums.

== Style and influences ==
Among their influences, the band mentions artists such as Luis Alberto Spinetta and Tame Impala.

== Discography ==
=== Studio albums ===
- BACH (2018)
- Paranoia Pop (2020)
- El Big Blue (2022)
- Vándalos (2025)

=== Extended plays ===
- Nunca Estuve Acá (2014)
- En el Aire (2017)

== Members ==
- Gregorio "Goyo" Degano – vocals (2009-present); keyboards (2009-2017)
- Salvador Colombo – keyboards (2011-present)
- Tomás Verduga – guitar and backing vocals (2009-present)
- Matías Verduga – drums (2009-present)
- Iñaki Colombo – guitars and keyboards (2009-present)
- Nicolás Rodríguez del Pozo – bass (2009-present)

== Awards and nominations ==
=== Gardel Awards ===
Year	Category	Nominated work	Result	Ref.
2019	Song of the Year	"Vámonos de Viaje"	Nominated	
2019	Best New Artist	BACH	Nominated	
2019	Best Pop Group Album	BACH	Won	
2021	Best Pop Group Album	Paranoia Pop	Won	
2023	Best Pop Group Album	El Big Blue	Won	

=== Latin Grammy Awards ===
Year	Category	Nominated work	Result	Ref.
2019	Best Alternative Music Album	BACH	Nominated	
2025	Best Pop/Rock Album	Vándalos	Pending	
2025	Best Alternative Song	"El Ritmo"	Pending	

Note: At the 20th Annual Latin Grammy Awards, Zac Hernández and Jerry Ordoñez (engineers), Jack Lahana (mixer) and Chab (mastering engineer) received a nomination for Best Engineered Album for their work in BACH.
