= Adán y Eva =

Single by Paulo Londra

from the album Homerun
- Language: Spanish
- Released: 5 November 2018
- Recorded: 2017
- Genre: Reggaeton
- Length: 4:18
- Label: Big Ligas; Warner Latina
- Songwriters: Paulo Londra; Daniel Echavarría; Cristian Salazar
- Producer: Ovy on the Drums

Paulo Londra singles chronology
"Cuando Te Besé" (2018)	"Adán y Eva" (2018)	"Forever Alone" (2019)

Music video
- "Adán y Eva" on YouTube

"Adán y Eva" is a song by Argentine rapper Paulo Londra. Released by Warner Latina and Big Ligas on 5 November 2018, it was written by Londra, Cristian Salazar and Ovy on the Drums, who also produced the song. The song title makes reference to the Abrahamic characters, Adam and Eve. With "Adán y Eva", Londra became the first and only artist to top the Billboard Argentina Hot 100 chart on two occasions, the first time with "Cuando Te Besé" in October, 2018. The song also reached number one in Costa Rica, Ecuador, Peru, Spain and Uruguay.

== Background ==
In a podcast interview with Argentine journalist Juan Pablo Varsky, Londra revealed that he had originally planned to release another song after "Cuando Te Besé", his collaboration with Becky G, however, after showing "Adán y Eva" to his grandmother, who liked it very much, he decided to contact his producer to tell her that they should move up the release of the single. Finally, the song was released on November 5, 2018.

== Commercial performance ==
"Adán y Eva" became a commercial success. In Argentina, the song debuted at number thirteen on the Billboard Argentina Hot 100 on the week dated November 17, 2018. On week dated November 30, 2018, the song moved to number one, becoming Londra's second single to peak on the top. The song reached number 1 on the Spain music charts during its third week. The single also reached the top of the charts in countries such as Costa Rica, Ecuador, Peru and Uruguay. On Spotify, "Adán y Eva" reached the number 10 spot in the global top enshrining Londra as the most listened Argentine artist of 2018.

In May 2021, the French company S-Money published a financial report, where it revealed that "Adán y Eva" was the tenth highest grossing song worldwide generating a figure of more than three million dollars because of its plays on the Spotify platform.

== Accolades ==
Awards and nominations for "Adán y Eva"
Year	Organization	Award	Result	Ref(s)
2019	Carlos Gardel Awards	Best Urban / Trap Song	Won	
2019	MTV MIAW Awards	Hit of the Year	Won	
2019	Los 40 Music Awards	Song LOS40 Global Show Award	Nominated	
2019	Quiero Awards	Best Urban Video	Nominated	
2019	Quiero Awards	Best Video of the Year	Nominated	
2020	Lo Nuestro Awards	Urban / Trap Song of the Year	Nominated	

== Music video ==
The music video was directed by Jackalope, produced by Viral Films and shot in Medellín, Colombia. The plot centers on Londra, who tries to conquer a girl through a dinner party that in the course of it goes wrong. At the same time, it shows a shadow and puppet theater play that narrates a love story. In November 2021, the video reached one billion views on YouTube, as did his song "Nena Maldición", making Londra the first Argentine artist to have two videos with this number of views.

== Credits and personnel ==
Credits are adapted from Jaxsta.

- Paulo Londra – songwriter, vocals
- Daniel Echavarría Oviedo – songwriter, recording engineer, musical production
- Cristian Salazar – songwriter
- Colin Leonard – mastering engineer
- Jaycen Joshua – mix engineer

== Charts ==
=== Weekly charts ===
Chart (2018–19)	Peak position
Argentina (Argentina Hot 100)	1
Belgium (Ultratop 50 Wallonia)	27
Bolivia (Monitor Latino)	3
Chile (Monitor Latino)	5
Colombia (Monitor Latino)	8
Colombia (National-Report)	7
Costa Rica (Monitor Latino)	1
Ecuador (Monitor Latino)	1
Ecuador (National-Report)	5
Guatemala (Monitor Latino)	6
Honduras (Monitor Latino)	5
Italy (FIMI)	18
Latin America (Monitor Latino)	4
Mexico (Billboard Mexican Airplay)	33
Nicaragua (Monitor Latino)	5
Panama (Monitor Latino)	8
Paraguay (Monitor Latino)	2
Peru (Monitor Latino)	1
Portugal (AFP)	66
Puerto Rico (Monitor Latino)	7
Spain (Promusicae)	1
Switzerland (Schweizer Hitparade)	47
Uruguay (Monitor Latino)	1
US Hot Latin Songs (Billboard)	29
US Latin Airplay (Billboard)	28
Venezuela (National-Report)	8

=== Monthly charts ===
Chart (2018–19)	Peak position
Argentina Digital Songs (CAPIF)	1
Panama (PRODUCE)	3
Paraguay (SGP)	1

=== Year-end charts ===
Chart (2018)	Position
Spain (PROMUSICAE)	91

Chart (2019)	Position
Argentina (Monitor Latino)	5
Italy (FIMI)	37
Spain (PROMUSICAE)	11
US Hot Latin Songs (Billboard)	71

== Certifications ==
Region	Certification	Certified units/sales
Argentina (CAPIF)	2× Platinum	40,000^{‡}
Colombia	Platinum	
Italy (FIMI)	2× Platinum	100,000^{‡}
Mexico (AMPROFON)	3× Platinum	180,000^{‡}
Portugal (AFP)	Gold	5,000^{‡}
Spain (Promusicae)	6× Platinum	360,000^{‡}
United States (RIAA)	11× Platinum (Latin)	660,000^{‡}
Streaming
Chile (PROFOVI)	Diamond	59,000,000
^{‡} Sales+streaming figures based on certification alone.

== Release history ==
Release dates and formats for "Adán y Eva"
Region	Date	Format	Label(s)	Ref.
Various	November 5, 2018	Digital download; streaming	Big Ligas; Warner	

== See also ==
- List of number-one singles of 2018 (Spain)
- List of number-one singles of 2019 (Spain)
- List of airplay number-one hits of the 2010s (Argentina)
- List of Billboard Argentina Hot 100 number-one singles of 2018
- List of Billboard Argentina Hot 100 number-one singles of 2019
