= Premio Lo Nuestro 2020 =

Latin Music awards show

32nd Lo Nuestro Awards
- Date: February 20, 2020
- Site: American Airlines Arena; Miami, Florida, USA
- Hosted by: Pitbull, Thalía, Alejandra Espinoza

Highlights
- Most wins: Daddy Yankee (7)
- Most nominations: Daddy Yankee (12)
- Excellence Award: Raphael

Television/radio coverage
- Network: Univision

The 32nd Lo Nuestro Awards ceremony, presented and televised by American television network Univision y Las Estrellas, recognized the most popular Spanish-language music of 2019 that was played on Uforia Audio Network during the year in 35 categories. The ceremony was hold on February 20, 2020 at the American Airlines Arena in Miami. The ceremony was hosted by American rapper Pitbull, Mexican singer Thalía, and model Alejandra Espinoza with each one being their first time hosting.

== Special Merit Awards ==
- Musical legacy award: Alejandro Fernandez
- Global Icon Award: J Balvin
- Excellence Award: Raphael

== Winners and nominees ==
The nominees for the 32nd Lo Nuestro Awards were announced digitally on January 14, 2020 by Univision.

Artist of the Year: Daddy Yankee; Christian Nodal; Reik; Romeo Santos	Album of the Year: Oasis – J Balvin and Bad Bunny; 11:11 – Maluma; Ahora – Christian Nodal; Ahora – Reik; Fantasía – Sebastián Yatra; Homerun – Paulo Londra; Ocean – Karol G; Opus – Marc Anthony; Simplemente Gracias – Calibre 50; Utopía – Romeo Santos
Song of the Year: "Con Calma" – Daddy Yankee featuring Snow; "Cariño a Medias" – Conjunto Primavera; "Parecen Viernes" – Marc Anthony; "Un Año" – Sebastián Yatra and Reik	Single of the Year: "Con Calma" – Daddy Yankee featuring Snow; "Cariño a Medias" – Conjunto Primavera; "Si Me Das Tu Amor" – Carlos Vives and Wisin; "Un Año" – Sebastián Yatra and Reik
New Artist – Female: Rosalía; Alaya; Cazzu; Mariah; Paloma Mami	New Artist – Male: Lunay; Alex Fernández; Los 2 de la S; Myke Towers; Sech
Remix of the Year: "Soltera" (Remix) – Lunay featuring Daddy Yankee and Bad Bunny; "Baila Baila Baila (Remix) – Ozuna featuring Daddy Yankee, J Balvin, Farruko and Anuel AA; "Calma" (Remix) – Pedro Capó and Farruko; "Me Gusta" (Remix) – Natti Natasha and Farruko; "Otro Trago" (Remix) – Sech and Darell featuring Ozuna, Anuel AA and Nicky Jam	Replay Song of the Year: "Yo Te Amo" – Los Temerarios; "Amor Lunático" – Eddy Herrera; "Cumbia Morena" – Control; "Kiliki Taka Ti" – Toño Rosario; "Volveré" – Wilfrido Vargas
Tour of the Year: X100pre Tour – Bad Bunny; #LaGiraTour – Alejandro Sanz; Por Más US Tour – Bronco; Desde El Alma Tour – Chayanne; Diosa de la Noche Tour – Gloria Trevi and Karol G; Arcoíris Tour – J Balvin; 11:11 World Tour – Maluma; Rayando El Sol Tour – Maná; Y La Historia Continúa Tour – Marco Antonio Solís; Como Antes Tour – Wisin & Yandel	Social Artist of the Year: Anuel AA; Ángela Aguilar; Chiquis Rivera; Natti Natasha; Thalía
Crossover Collaboration of the Year: "Con Calma" – Daddy Yankee featuring Snow; "Contra La Pared" – Sean Paul and J Balvin; "I Can't Get Enough" – Benny Blanco, Tainy, Selena Gomez and J Balvin; "R.I.P." – Sofía Reyes featuring Rita Ora and Anitta; "Runaway" – Sebastián Yatra featuring Jonas Brothers, Daddy Yankee and Natti Natasha	Video of the Year: "Flor" – Los Rivera Destino featuring Bad Bunny; "Aleluya" – Reik and Manuel Turizo; "Blue (Diminuto Planeta Azul)" – Macaco featuring Jorge Drexler and Joan Manuel Serrat; "En Guerra" – Sebastián Yatra and Camilo; "La Prisión De Folsom (Folsom Prison Blues)" – Los Tigres del Norte; "Party" – Paulo Londra featuring A Boogie Wit Da Hoodie; "Rayando El Sol" – Maná featuring Pablo Alborán; "R.I.P." – Sofía Reyes featuring Rita Ora and Anitta; "Tú Eres La Razón (Electrocumbia Remake)" – Raymix; "Tu Rumba" – Ile
Pop/Rock Artist of the Year: Sebastián Yatra; Camilo; Juanes; Luis Fonsi; Pedro Capó	Pop/Rock Song of the Year: "Un Año" – Sebastián Yatra and Reik; "De Cero" – CNCO; "No Te Vayas" – Camilo; "Rayando El Sol" – Maná featuring Pablo Alborán; "Te Confieso" – Camila
Pop/Rock Collaboration of the Year: "Calma" (Remix) – Pedro Capó and Farruko; "Amigos Con Derechos" – Reik and Maluma; "Créeme" – Karol G and Maluma; "Imposible" – Luis Fonsi and Ozuna; "Un Año" – Sebastián Yatra and Reik	Pop/Rock Group or Duo of the Year: CNCO; Jesse & Joy; Maná; Piso 21; Reik
Pop/Ballad Artist of the Year: Luis Fonsi; Camila; Carlos Rivera; Chayanne; Franco de Vita; Jesse & Joy; Luis Miguel; Natalia Jiménez; Ricardo Arjona; Ricardo Montaner	Female Urban Artist of the Year: Karol G; Becky G; Natti Natasha; Paloma Mami; Rosalía
Male Urban Artist of the Year: Daddy Yankee; Bad Bunny; J Balvin; Nicky Jam; Ozuna	Urban Song of the Year: "Con Calma" – Daddy Yankee featuring Snow; "Baila Baila Baila" – Ozuna; "No Lo Trates" – Pitbull, Daddy Yankee and Natti Natasha; "Qué Pretendes" – J Balvin and Bad Bunny; "Te Robaré" – Nicky Jam and Ozuna
Urban Collaboration of the Year: "Secreto" – Anuel AA and Karol G; "Con Calma" – Daddy Yankee featuring Snow; "No Lo Trates" – Pitbull, Daddy Yankee and Natti Natasha; "Qué Pretendes" – J Balvin and Bad Bunny; "Te Robaré" – Nicky Jam and Ozuna	Urban/Pop Song of the Year: "Calma" (Remix) – Pedro Capó and Farruko; "Amigos Con Derechos" – Reik and Maluma; "Créeme" – Karol G and Maluma; "Date La Vuelta" – Luis Fonsi, Sebastián Yatra and Nicky Jam; "Imposible" – Luis Fonsi and Ozuna
Urban/Trap Song of the Year: "Callaíta" – Bad Bunny and Tainy; "Adán y Eva" – Paulo Londra; "Delincuente" – Farruko, Anuel AA and Kendo Kaponi; "Después Que Te Perdí" – Jon Z; "No Me Conoce" (Remix) – Jhay Cortéz featuring J Balvin and Bad Bunny	Tropical Artist of the Year: Romeo Santos; Carlos Vives; Juan Luis Guerra; Marc Anthony; Silvestre Dangond
Tropical Song of the Year: "Inmortal" – Aventura; "Kitipun" – Juan Luis Guerra; "Parecen Viernes" – Marc Anthony; "Si Me Das Tu Amor" – Carlos Vives and Wisin; "Vivir Bailando" – Silvestre Dangond and Maluma	Tropical Collaboration of the Year: "Si Me Das Tu Amor" – Carlos Vives and Wisin; "El Mentiroso" – Gente de Zona and Silvestre Dangond; "Loma de Cayenas" – Vicente García and Juan Luis Guerra; "Tan Buena" – Gente de Zona featuring Mau & Ricky; "Vivir Bailando" – Silvestre Dangond and Maluma
Regional Mexican Artist of the Year: Christian Nodal; El Fantasma; Raymix; Regulo Caro; Remmy Valenzuela	Regional Mexican Song of the Year: "Nada nuevo" – Christian Nodal; "Cariño a medias" – Conjunto Primavera; "En plural" – Los 2 de La S; "Encantadora" – El Fantasma; "Perfecta" – Banda Los Recoditos
Regional Mexican Collaboration of the Year: "Un año" – Banda Los Sebastianes and Sebastián Yatra; "Amor a primera vista" – Los Ángeles Azules, Belinda, Lalo Ebratt featuring Horacio Palencia; "Pa'que nos hacemos" – Luis Coronel and Banda Los Recoditos; "Sin memoria" – Julión Álvarez and Alfredo Olivas; "Tiene razón la lógica" – La Arrolladora Banda El Limón featuring Espinoza Paz	Regional Mexican Group or Duo of the Year: Calibre 50; Banda Los Recoditos; Banda Sinaloense Ms de Sergio Lizárraga; La Arrolladora Banda El Limón; La Maquinaria Norteña
Regional Mexican "Sierreño" Artist of the Year: Ulices Chaidez; Carín León; Jovanny Cadena y Su Estilo Privado; Lenin Ramírez; Virlán García	Regional Mexican "Sierreño" Song of the Year: "Cómo no quererte" – Ulices Chaidez; "Déjame robarte un beso" – Los Crecidos; "Me la aventé" – Carín León; "Platícame de ti" – Arsenal Efectivo; "Sigo chambeando" – Fuerza Regida
Regional Mexican Band of the Year (Song): "Por siempre mi amor" – Banda Sinaloense Ms; "En plural" – Los 2 de La S; "Encantadora" – El Fantasma; "Mentiras" – Remmy Valenzuela; "Perfecta" – Banda Los Recoditos	Regional Mexican Northern Song of the Year: "Simplemente gracias" – Calibre 50; "A punto de empezar" – Duelo; "Cariño a medias" – Conjunto primavera; "Piénsalo bien" – Regulo Caro; "Uno para el otro" – La Maquinaria Norteña
Regional Mexican Mariachi Song of the Year: "Nada nuevo" – Christian Nodal; "Mi persona preferida" – El Bebeto; "Quítate la careta" – Voz de Mando; "Solos" – Ana Bárbara Ft. Christian Nodal; "Te amaré" – Alex Fernandez
