= Hits of the World =

Weekly listing of record charts by Billboard magazine

The Hits of the World is a collection of weekly record charts published by Billboard magazine. It ranks the top 25 songs in more than 40 countries around the globe based on streaming and digital sales. These charts in 40+ countries joined existing chart listings for Billboard-branded licensees in Argentina, Italy, Japan, South Korea and Vietnam, along with Billboard's longstanding third-party partner charts like Official Charts Company in the United Kingdom.

Announced on February 14, 2022, and launched the following day, the tracking period for each chart runs from Friday to Thursday of every week with new charts released every Tuesday.

Hits of the World takes its name from the pages of the old Billboard magazines, where were listed charts around the world.

== Methodology ==
The chart tracks songs' performance from Friday to Thursday and is made available on Tuesday morning. Each chart includes 25 songs, ranked based on streaming data and digital sales provided by MRC Data, in a unique blend for each territory.

== Charts ==
=== Pre-existing charts ===
- Billboard Argentina Hot 100
- Billboard Canadian Albums
- Billboard Canadian Hot 100
- Billboard Italia Hot 100
- Billboard Japan Hot 100
- Billboard K-pop 100 (discontinued and replaced by South Korea Songs chart as of the issue dated May 7, 2022)
- The Official U.K. Albums Chart
- The Official U.K. Songs Chart
- Australia Albums
- Germany Albums
- Greece Albums

=== Later charts ===
- Billboard Brasil Hot 100 (added to Hits of the World on August 28, 2023 following the Billboard Brasil relaunch; in replacement for Brazil Songs)
- China TME UNI Chart (launched by Tencent Music in 2018, incorporated to Hits of the World since 2023)
- Billboard Philippines Hot 100 (added to Hits of the World on July 16, 2024; re-launched on July 3, 2024, in replacement for Philippines Songs)
- Top Philippine Songs (added to Hits of the World on July 16, 2024, in replacement for Philippines Songs)
- Billboard Thailand Top Thai Songs (launched on March 17, 2023, in replacement for Thailand Songs; last charts available dated June 29, 2026) (Note: Launched as a stand-alone chart but is also featured on the Hits of the World section of Billboard.)
- Billboard Thailand Top Thai Country Songs (launched on March 17, 2023, in replacement for Thailand Songs; last charts available dated June 29, 2026)
- Billboard Vietnam Hot 100 (discontinued on December 30, 2023; re-launched on May 27, 2025)

=== Africa ===
- South Africa Songs

=== Asia-Pacific ===
- Australia Songs
- Hong Kong Songs
- India Songs
- Indonesia Songs
- Malaysia Songs
- New Zealand Songs
- Singapore Songs
- South Korea Songs (added on issue dated May 7, 2022 as a replacement of the K-pop Hot 100; discontinued, last charts available dated on January 18, 2025)
- Taiwan Songs
- Thailand Songs (removed as of the issue dated February 26, 2022; re-launched on issue dated August 1, 2026)
- Turkey Songs

=== Europe ===
- Austria Songs
- Belgium Songs
- Croatia Songs
- Czech Republic Songs
- Denmark Songs
- Finland Songs
- France Songs
- Germany Songs
- Greece Songs
- Hungary Songs
- Iceland Songs
- Ireland Songs
- Luxembourg Songs
- Netherlands Songs
- Norway Songs
- Poland Songs
- Portugal Songs
- Romania Songs
- Russia Songs (removed as of the issue dated April 9, 2022)
- Slovakia Songs
- Spain Songs
- Sweden Songs
- Switzerland Songs
- U.K. Songs

=== Latin America ===
- Bolivia Songs
- Chile Songs
- Colombia Songs (removed as of the issue dated March 15, 2025)
- Ecuador Songs
- Mexico Songs
- Peru Songs
