= Cuando Te Besé =

Single by Becky G and Paulo Londra

from the album Mala Santa
- Language: Spanish
- English title: "When I Kissed You"
- Released: August 2, 2018
- Recorded: 2018
- Genre: Reggaeton
- Length: 4:14
- Label: Sony Latin
- Songwriters: Paulo Londra; Cristian Salazar; Daniel Echavarría Oviedo
- Producers: Ovy on the Drums; Jorge Fonseca

Becky G singles chronology
"Zooted" (2018)	"Cuando Te Besé" (2018)	"Díganle (Remix)" (2018)

Paulo Londra singles chronology
"Chica Paranormal" (2018)	"Cuando Te Besé" (2018)	"Adán y Eva" (2018)

Music video
- "Cuando Te Besé" on YouTube

"Cuando Te Besé" is a song by American singer Becky G and Argentine rapper and singer Paulo Londra. Released on August 2, 2018, it was written by Londra, Cristian Salazar and Daniel Echavarría Oviedo. "Cuando Te Besé" was the first song to top the Billboard Argentina Hot 100 chart.

== Background and composition ==
On August 1, 2018, Becky G and Londra revealed through their social medias that they would release a musical collaboration titled "Cuando Te Besé", which was published two days after its announcement. The song was written by Paulo Londra, Ovy on the Drums and Cristian Salazar.

"Cuando Te Besé" is described as a romantic urban music track with the sounds of reggaeton, latin R&B and latin pop, adding some latin trap resources. The lyrics talk about a sweet and sensual exchange between two people and the memory of the best kiss they have ever had.

== Commercial performance ==
The single debuted at No. 1 on the Billboard Argentina Hot 100, marking Becky G and Londra's first No. 1 on the chart, as well as the first song to top the chart. In the United States, "Cuando Te Besé" debuted at No. 48 on the Hot Latin Songs chart and weeks later peaked at No. 30 on the chart.

== Music video ==
The video was directed by Paloma Valencia and produced by 36 Grados. The plot takes place in a car parking lot, where there is a meeting of friends with music and drinks, in which Gomez and Londra connect from the beginning, with looks that lead to an approach, at first distant, but full of tension, and at the time of their approach the two are separated immediately when a police car appears at the site.

== Live performances ==
Gomez performed the song at the Coachella Valley Music and Arts Festival on April 14 and 21, 2023.

== Accolades ==
Awards and nominations for "Cuando Te Besé"
Organization	Year	Category	Result	Ref.
MTV Millennial Awards	2019	Music-Ship of the year	Nominated	
Premios Gardel	2019	Collaboration of the Year	Nominated	
Premios Gardel	2019	Best Urban/Trap Song or Album	Nominated	
Premios Gardel	2019	Best Urban/Trap Collaboration	Won	
Premios Quiero	2018	Best Female Video Artist	Nominated	
Premios Quiero	2018	Best Extraordinary Encounter	Nominated	

== Charts ==
=== Weekly charts ===
Weekly chart performance for "Cuando Te Besé"
Chart (2018–19)	Peak position
Argentina (Argentina Hot 100)	1
Argentina Airplay (Monitor Latino)	4
Bolivia (Monitor Latino)	2
Chile (Monitor Latino)	20
Colombia (National-Report)	20
Costa Rica (Monitor Latino)	5
Dominican Republic (Monitor Latino)	13
Ecuador (Monitor Latino)	11
El Salvador (Monitor Latino)	6
Guatemala (Monitor Latino)	1
Latin America (Monitor Latino)	6
Mexico (Mexico Español Airplay)	34
Nicaragua (Monitor Latino)	9
Panama (PRODUCE)	24
Paraguay (Monitor Latino)	4
Peru (Monitor Latino)	3
Spain (PROMUSICAE)	10
Uruguay (Monitor Latino)	5
US Hot Latin Songs (Billboard)	30
US Latin Airplay (Billboard)	28
US Latin Rhythm Airplay (Billboard)	15

=== Year-end charts ===
2018 year-end chart performance for "Cuando Te Besé"
Chart (2018)	Position
Argentina (Monitor Latino)	48
Spain (PROMUSICAE)	60

2019 year-end chart performance for "Cuando Te Besé"
Chart (2019)	Position
Argentina (Monitor Latino)	44
US Hot Latin Songs (Billboard)	91
Venezuela Airplay (Monitor Latino)	97

== Certifications ==
Certifications and sales for "Cuando Te Besé"
Region	Certification	Certified units/sales
Argentina (CAPIF)	Gold	10,000^{‡}
Brazil (Pro-Música Brasil)	Gold	20,000^{‡}
Mexico (AMPROFON)	2× Diamond+2× Platinum	720,000^{‡}
Peru	2× Diamond	400,000
Spain (Promusicae)	3× Platinum	120,000^{‡}
United States (RIAA)	2× Platinum (Latin)	120,000^{‡}
^{‡} Sales+streaming figures based on certification alone.

== Release history ==
Release dates and formats for "Cuando Te Besé"
Region	Date	Format	Label(s)	Ref.
Various	August 2, 2018	Digital download; streaming	Sony Music Latin	

== See also ==
- List of airplay number-one hits of the 2010s (Argentina)
- List of Billboard Argentina Hot 100 number-one singles of 2018
