= Jaxsta =

Australian online music credits platform

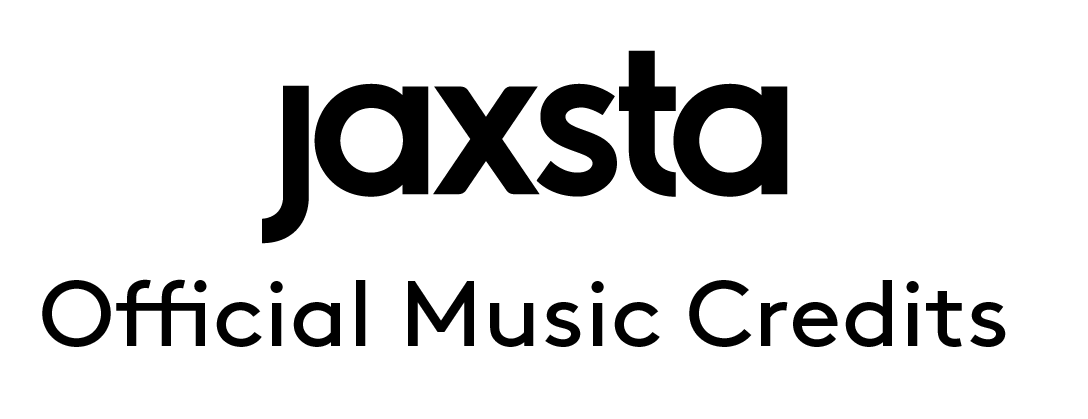
- Industry: Music
- Founded: 2015
- Founder: Jacqui Louez Schoorl; Louis Schoorl
- Defunct: November 21, 2025
- Headquarters: Sydney, New South Wales, Australia
- Key people: Josh Simons (Chief Executive Officer); Jorge Nigaglionii (Chief Financial Officer)
- Parent: Vinyl Group
- Website: jaxsta.com

Jaxsta was an Australia-based database of official music credits, including performers, artists, engineers, producers and songwriters. Jaxsta's data is content-owner supplied rather than crowd-sourced.

== History ==
Jaxsta was founded in Sydney in 2015 by former movie and music industry professional Jacqui Louez Schoorl and her husband Louis Schoorl, a producer and songwriter. Jaxsta has offices in Sydney and Los Angeles, with representatives in London and New York.

The idea for Jaxsta was first formulated by Louez Schoorl in 2006 when she was transitioning from the film to the music industry and noticed music credits metadata was becoming lost with the transition to digital music, as the credits that had once populated vinyl record sleeve and CD booklets were vanishing as downloading was becoming more prevalent. Jaxsta derives its name from the credits on vinyl "jackets" (covers) – the stars of the jackets – i.e. liner notes.

The company was launched in beta mode on June 13, 2019, with the claim that it contained more than 100 million music credits, including those for 1.9 million songwriters, 1.3 million artists, 150,000 producers and 100,000 engineers.

On April 22, 2020 Jaxsta announced it was waiving the $US150 annual membership fee and making Jaxsta membership free for the rest of 2020 to assist the music industry during the COVID-19 pandemic.

On September 10, 2020, Jaxsta came to an agreement with music licensing platform Songtradr in which the latter invested A$1.92 million into the company. This arrangement allowed Jaxsta members to utilise the revenue collection service provided by Songtradr, while the latter would leverage Jaxsta's metadata to identify uncollected fees.

On December 17, 2025, Jaxsta was shut down. The company said "Over the past year, we've worked hard to build a sustainable business […] Despite these efforts, the current model does not scale, which means we can no longer offer the service in a viable way."

== Database ==
Jaxsta claimed to be the "world's only official music credits database", obtaining its metadata directly from record labels, publishers, distributors and industry associations. Its data partners included the three major labels (Universal Music Group, Sony Music Entertainment and Warner Music Group), the Merlin Network of independent music companies and unions including the American Federation of Musicians and SAG-AFTRA, as well as independent distributors such as CDBaby, DistroKid and SoundCloud Repost. The Recording Industry Association of America (RIAA) and The Recording Academy.

A commercial API was available, providing programmatic access to the data. In November 2022 a new feature was added that matched works to recordings, allowing users of its database to secure lost royalties, source song licenses and syncs.

== Awards ==
Jaxsta was named Master of Metadata at the 2023 Music Business Association Bizzy Awards. The award recognizes significant impact data processing, credit clarification, streamlining and more.

== Membership plans ==
Jaxsta's business-to-business membership plan was launched on November 21, 2019. It offered music industry specific tools such as chart alerts for artists and non-artists, industry events calendars, market insights and gave members the ability to claim and manage their Jaxsta profile page .

In August 2021, to coincide with the return of paid memberships, Jaxsta introduced two levels of membership: Jaxsta Core, a free introductory membership, and Jaxsta Plus, which for $US49 a year offered members access to a suite of features such as Credit and Chart Alerts, the ability to claim their profile (or the profiles of those they represent), Prioritize Your Credits, and more.

In June 2022 Jaxsta's membership plans evolved to reflect the music industry's demand for accurate metadata, resulting in the introduction of a further two levels of membership: Business and Enterprise. Jaxsta Plus was rebranded Creator, and Jaxsta Core became the free membership level.

== Jaxsta One Sheet ==
In November 2021, Jaxsta introduced the Jaxsta One Sheet in an effort to help music professionals create a "shareable resume". The One Sheet is pre-populated by information on the user's Jaxsta profile, including credits, social media statistics, TikTok plays, contact details, bio, image and more.

== Content ==
In December 2019, Jaxsta launched its podcast, Humans of Music, hosted by former Rolling Stone Australia editor Rod Yates. Guests have included Snow Patrol frontman Gary Lightbody, Billy Bragg, Bethany Cosentino, Neko Case, John Butler and M-Phazes.

In June 2020, it was announced that Yates would head up Jaxsta's dedicated editorial portal.
