= Paulo Londra =

Argentine rapper and singer (born 1998)

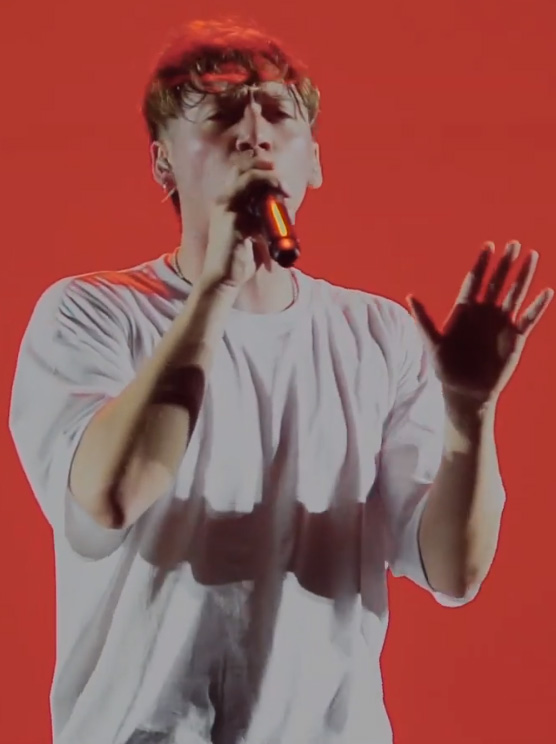
- Londra in 2020
- Born: Paulo Ezequiel Londra; 12 April 1998 (age 28); Córdoba, Argentina
- Occupations: Rapper; singer; songwriter
- Years active: 2017–present
- Partner: Rocío Moreno (2015–2021)
- Children: 2
- Musical career
- Genre: Urbano
- Website: paulolondra.us

Paulo Ezequiel Londra (born 12 April 1998) is an Argentine rapper and singer. His music has topped Argentine charts and has been highly successful across Argentina and Latin America.

== Early life ==
Londra was inspired to become a rap artist by watching Eminem's 8 Mile film. The urge to interpret his lyrics outside of a recording studio led him to improvise and rap in Argentinian squares with friends, gradually creating a local buzz.

At the age of 14, he performed for the first time in a freestyle competition, in a tournament known as Sin Escritura ('Without Writing'). However, Paulo confessed that he did not do well in rap battles, since in those competitions the rappers who threw the most aggressive bars usually won, and he demonstrated another type of more melodic and technical style.

Leaving his comfort zone and freestyling in squares helped with his shyness, and launched a competitive period spanning around five years. He forged his style battling in freestyle contests as the so-called El Quinto Escalón, and rapidly stepped up to Latin trap.

== Career ==
His professional career kicked off with "Relax", a song he uploaded in early 2017. Londra's music avoids themes prominent in urban music, such as violence and drugs.

Londra became well known through his hit songs "Nena Maldición" (featuring Lenny Tavarez), "Te Amo" (with Piso 21), and "Cuando Te Besé" (with Becky G). The latter peaked at number 45 on the Billboard Hot Latin Songs and became the first song to ever top the Billboard Argentina Hot 100. His song "Adán y Eva" also topped Billboard's Argentina Hot 100.

In 2019, he was featured on Ed Sheeran's No.6 Collaborations Project, performing on the song "Nothing on You" along with British rapper Dave. On 26 September of the same year, Londra released the song "Party", a collaboration with the American rapper and singer A Boogie wit da Hoodie.

In May 2020, a conflict between Paulo and his label Big Ligas was made public through Instagram, where Ovy on the Drums and Kristoman were accused of manipulating Londra's contract and defrauding him to have the rights to his songs without the consent of the latter. Londra would later publish an open letter in which he would disclose the reasons for the conflict, claiming that they made him sign with Warner Music without his consent to record his first album, and that they scammed him into signing a contract that linked him to Big Ligas until 2025. This resulted in Paulo not being able to release more music until he could solve the court case that his lawyers are carrying out to be able to terminate his contract with Warner and Big Ligas.

== Discography ==
- Homerun (2019)
- Back to the Game (2022)

== Tours ==
- Leones Con Flow Tour (2018)
- Homerun Tour (2019–2020)

== Awards and nominations ==
Year	Award	Category	Nominated work	Result	Ref.
2018	Jerónimo Awards	Special Distinction	—	Won	
2018	Kids' Choice Awards Argentina	Best New Artist	—	Nominated	
2018	MTV Europe Music Awards	Best Latin America South Act	—	Nominated	
2018	Premios Quiero	Best Urban Video	"Te Amo"	Nominated	
2018	Premios Quiero	Best Collaboration	"Cuando Te Besé"	Nominated	
2018	Martín Fierro Digital Awards	Best Music Artist	—	Nominated	
2018	Latin Music Italian Awards	Best Latin Revelation of The Year	—	Nominated	
2018	Latin Music Italian Awards	Favorite Liryc Song	"Te Amo"	Nominated	
2019	Heat Latin Music Awards	Best New Artist	—	Nominated	
2019	Gardel Awards	Best Urban/Trap Song or Album	"Adán y Eva"	Won	
2019	Gardel Awards	Best Urban/Trap Song or Album	"Chica Paranormal"	Nominated	
2019	Gardel Awards	Best Urban/Trap Song or Album	"Dímelo"	Nominated	
2019	Gardel Awards	Best Urban/Trap Song or Album	"Cuando Te Besé"	Nominated	
2019	Gardel Awards	Collaboration of the Year	"Cuando Te Besé"	Nominated	
2019	Gardel Awards	Best Urban/Trap Collaboration	"Cuando Te Besé"	Won	
2019	Gardel Awards	Best New Artist	—	Nominated	
2019	MTV Millennial Awards	Best Argentine Instagrammer	—	Nominated	
2019	MTV Millennial Awards	Instacrush	—	Nominated	
2019	MTV Millennial Awards	Argentine Artist of the Year	—	Nominated	
2019	MTV Millennial Awards	Hit of the Year	"Adán y Eva"	Won	
2019	MTV Millennial Awards	Collaboration of the Year	"Cuando Te Besé"	Nominated	
2019	Youth Awards	Best New Artist	—	Nominated	
2019	Latin American Music Awards	New Artist of the Year	—	Nominated	
2019	LOS40 Music Awards	LOS40 Global Show Award	"Adán y Eva"	Nominated	
2019	Latin Grammy Awards	Best New Artist	—	Nominated	
2019	MTV Europe Music Awards | Best Latin America South Act	Nominated	—		
2019	Martín Fierro Fashion Awards	Best Male Singer Style	—	Nominated	
2019	Quiero Awards	Best Male Artist Video	"Adán y Eva"	Nominated	
2019	Quiero Awards	Best Trap Video	"No Puedo"	Nominated	
2019	Quiero Awards	Best Urban Video	"Adán y Eva"	Nominated	
2019	Quiero Awards	Best Video of the Year	"Adán y Eva"	Nominated	
2019	Martín Fierro Digital Awards	Best Music Artist	—	Nominated	
2020	Billboard Latin Music Awards	Best New Artist of the Year	—	Nominated	
2020	Lo Nuestro Awards	Album of the Year	Homerum	Nominated	
2020	Lo Nuestro Awards	Video of the Year	"Party"	Nominated	
2020	Lo Nuestro Awards	Urban/Trap Song of the Year	"Adan y Eva"	Nominated	
2020	Spotify Awards	Most Followed Artist	—	Nominated	
2020	Spotify Awards	Most-Streamed Male Artist on Consoles	—	Nominated	
2020	Spotify Awards	Most-Streamed Male Artist – For Users From 13 to 17 Years Old	—	Nominated	
2020	Heat Latin Music Awards	Best South Artist	—	Nominated	
2020	Your Urban Music Awards	Top Latinoamerican Urban Arstist	—	Nominated	
2020	Gardel Awards	Album of the Year	Homerum	Nominated	
2020	Gardel Awards	Best Urban/Trap Song or Album	Homerum	Nominated	
2020	Gardel Awards	Best Urban/Trap Collaboration	"Party"	Nominated	
2020	Gardel Awards	Best Urban/Trap Collaboration	"Sólo Pienso En Ti"	Nominated	
