= Warner Music Latina =

American record label

- Parent company: Warner Music Group
- Founded: 1987
- Genre: Latin music
- Country of origin: United States
- Location: Miami, Florida

Warner Music Latina Inc. (formerly WEA Latina) is a record label part of Warner Music Group that focuses on Latin music. The record label was established in 1987.

== List of artists currently on Warner Music Latina ==
- Alaya
- Alex Ubago
- Andrés Calamaro
- Belinda
- Blessd
- Bohemia Suburbana
- Bonny Lovy
- Buika
- Cosculluela
- DannyLux
- David Amaya
- David Cavazos
- David DeMaria
- David Soliz
- Dawer X Damper from Colombia
- De la Ghetto
- Diana Navarro
- El Sueño de Morfeo
- Fangoria
- Fito & Fitipaldis
- Francisco Céspedes
- Gilberto Gil
- Hombres G
- Huecco
- Isabella Castillo
- Ivan Lins
- Jarabe De Palo
- Jesse & Joy
- Jorge Drexler
- Jorge Villamizar
- Junior H
- Kidd Keo
- La Cruz
- La Ley
- Las Villa from Colombia
- Laura Pausini
- Lena
- Lit Killah
- Los Claxons
- Luis Miguel
- Lupe Fiasco
- Mägo de Oz
- Maná
- Manuel Medrano
- María Becerra
- Mariana Ochoa
- Maite Perroni
- Matamba
- Maxiolly from Colombia
- MC Davo
- Miguel Bosé
- Mijares
- Motel
- Pablo Alborán
- Paulo Londra
- Pedro Infante
- Piso 21
- Reykon
- Sie7e
- Sofía Reyes
- Tommy Torres
- Ximena Sariñana
- Yahir
- Zion & Lennox

== List of artists formerly on Warner Music Latina ==
- Alejandro Sanz
- Bacilos
- Banda Machos
- Banda Pequeños Musical
- Casa de Leones
- Charlie Cruz
- El Poder Del Norte (known as Los Pioneros while under contract to WEA)
- El Tri
- Frankie Negrón
- Glenn Monroig
- Olga Tañón
- Pesado
- Ricardo Arjona (his independent label Metamorfosis is distributed by Warner Music Latina)
- Ricardo Montaner
- Tego Calderón
- Tigrillos
- Tito Nieves
- Wilkins (singer)
- Yolandita Monge

== See also ==
- List of Warner Music Group labels
