= Argentine Chamber of Phonograms and Videograms Producers =

Argentine music industry association

Cámara Argentina de Productores de Fonogramas y Videogramas
- Official logo of CAPIF
- Abbreviation: CAPIF
- Formation: June 25, 1958; 68 years ago
- Type: NGO
- Legal status: Association
- Purpose: Trade organization protecting music production companies' interests
- Headquarters: Buenos Aires
- Location: Argentina
- Director Ejecutivo: Javier Delupí
- Main organ: Comisión Directiva
- Affiliations: IFPI
- Website: www.capif.org.ar

The Argentine Chamber of Phonograms and Videograms Producers (Spanish: Cámara Argentina de Productores de Fonogramas y Videogramas, CAPIF) is an Argentine organization member of the IFPI, which represents the music industry in the country. It is a nonprofit organization integrated by multinational and independent record labels.

== Sales certification ==
CAPIF launched its Gold and Platinum certification program in 1980. Initially, albums required to sell 30,000 units to become Gold and 60,000 units to become Platinum. CAPIF, however, lowered its certification levels in the beginning of 2001 to reflect the declining sales in the recording industry. In 2016, CAPIF once again lowered its certification levels for albums, digital singles and DVD releases, and introduced certifications for music sets (CD+DVD) and certifications based on streaming for both albums and singles.

=== Current accreditation levels ===
Format	Current Accreditation Levels		
Format	Gold	Platinum	Diamond
Album (Note: The same accreditation levels can be applied to album certifications based on either physical sales or digital downloads.)	10,000	20,000	135,000
Single (Note: The current accreditation levels for singles consider either digital downloads or streaming numbers. Certifications for singles based on physical sales were suppressed in 2001.)	10,000	20,000	135,000
Streaming	8,000,000	16,000,000	100,000,000
DVD	5,000	10,000	50,000
CD+DVD	5,000	10,000	50,000

=== Historical accreditation levels ===
==== Albums ====
Period	Gold certification	Platinum certification	Diamond certification
January 1980–December 31, 2000	30,000	60,000	500,000
January 1, 2001 – June 30, 2016	20,000	40,000	250,000
July 1, 2016–present	10,000	20,000	135,000

==== Singles ====
Certification based on	Gold certification	Platinum certification	Diamond certification
Physical sales (suppressed in 2001)	50,000	100,000	N/A
Digital downloads	10,000	20,000	135,000
Streams	8,000,000	16,000,000	100,000,000

==== DVD ====
Period	Gold certification	Platinum certification	Diamond certification
Until 2011	4,000	8,000	N/A
2011–June 30, 2016	7,500	15,000	75,000
July 1, 2016–present	5,000	10,000	50,000

==== Other releases ====
Type of release	Gold certification	Platinum certification	Diamond certification
Compilation albums (suppressed in 2001)	100,000	200,000	N/A
Music sets (CD+DVD) (since 2016)	5,000	10,000	50,000

== CAPIF Charts ==
The CAPIF Charts are the main Argentine music sales charts, issued monthly. The charts are a record of the highest selling singles and albums in various genres. All charts are compiled from data of both physical and digital sales from retailers in Argentina. CAPIF stopped publishing charts since 2018. A weekly top 10 albums chart is now published by Diario de Cultura, while the standard singles chart for the country is now the Argentina Hot 100, published by Billboard.

Current published charts:

- CAPIF Top 10 Streaming Singles

Discontinued:

- CAPIF Top 10 Albums (physical sales)
- CAPIF Top 10 Singles (digital sales)
- CAPIF Top 10 Albums (music stores sales)
- CAPIF Year-End Top 10 Albums (physical sales)
- CAPIF Year-End Top 10 Singles (digital sales)
- CAPIF Year-End Top 10 Albums (music stores sales)

=== Number-ones ===
- 2021-2022 (albums)
- 2017 (albums and singles)
- 2018 (albums and singles)

== See also ==
- List of diamond-certified albums in Argentina
- Sociedad Argentina de Autores y Compositores de Música
