= Deaths in May 2022 =

The following is a list of notable deaths in May 2022.

Entries for each day are listed alphabetically by surname. A typical entry lists information in the following sequence:

- Name, age, country of citizenship at birth, subsequent country of citizenship (if applicable), reason for notability, cause of death (if known), and reference.

== May 2022 ==
=== 1 ===
- James A. Andersen, 97, American politician, member of the Washington House of Representatives (1959–1967) and Senate (1967–1973).
- Stephen Clinch, 52, Irish actor and former heroin addict, heart attack.
- Millie Bailey, 104, American World War II veteran (WAC) and civil servant.
- Naftali Blumenthal, 100, Polish-born Israeli politician, MK (1981–1984).
- Kathy Boudin, 78, American political activist and convicted murderer, cancer.
- Bertha Conton, 98, Sierra Leonean educator.
- Ray Freeman, 90, British chemist.
- Ilan Gilon, 65, Israeli politician, MK (1999–2003, 2009–2021).
- Ángela Hernández, 31, Colombian politician, lawyer and journalist, breast cancer.
- Freddy Johnston, 86, Scottish journalist.
- Dominique Lecourt, 78, French philosopher.
- Mike Liles, 76, American politician, member of the Tennessee House of Representatives (1991–1995).
- Rajshekhar Mansur, 79, Indian classical vocalist.
- Takuya Miyamoto, 38, Japanese footballer (Cerezo Osaka, Montedio Yamagata, Avispa Fukuoka).
- Carlos Eduardo Moreira Ferreira, 83, Brazilian businessman and politician, deputy (1999–2003).
- Henry Coke Morgan Jr., 87, American federal judge, Eastern District of Virginia (since 1992).
- Jim Murphy, 74, American author (The Long Road to Gettysburg, Blizzard! The Storm That Changed America, The Call of the Wolves).
- Ivica Osim, 80, Bosnian football player (Željezničar) and manager (Yugoslavia national team, Sturm Graz), heart attack.
- Ric Parnell, 70, English drummer (Atomic Rooster, Spinal Tap) and actor (This Is Spinal Tap).
- Charles Siebert, 84, American actor (Trapper John, M.D., ...And Justice for All, One Day at a Time), complications from COVID-19.
- Sally Siegrist, 70, American politician, member of the Indiana House of Representatives (2016–2018).
- Roberta Tomber, 68, British archaeologist.
- Josephine Tsang, 62, Hong Kong politician, member of the Islands District Council (since 2014), suicide by charcoal burning.
- Jerry verDorn, 72, American actor (One Life to Live, Guiding Light), cancer.
- Michel Vinaver, 95, French writer and dramatist.
- Régine Zylberberg, 92, Belgian-born French singer and nightclub owner.

=== 2 ===
- Vytautas Beleska, 69, Lithuanian-American musician.
- Max Boyes, 87, British Olympic hurdler (1960).
- Ursula Braun-Moser, 84, German politician, MEP (1984–1989, 1990–1994).
- María José Cantilo, 68, Argentine singer-songwriter.
- Roberto Chapula de la Mora, 66, Mexican politician, member of the Congress of Colima (2000–2003, 2006–2009, since 2021), shot.
- Gianfranco De Bosio, 97, Italian film director (The Terrorist, In Love, Every Pleasure Has Its Pain) and screenwriter.
- Vitali Dzerbianiou, 45, Belarusian Olympic weightlifter (2008).
- Graham Farquharson, 81, Canadian mining engineer.
- Jean-Marie Faux, 98, Belgian Jesuit author, translator and theologian.
- Biancamaria Frabotta, 75, Italian writer.
- Peter Frohmader, 63, German composer, musician and visual artist.
- Nield Gordon, 91, American college basketball coach (Winthrop Eagles).
- João Gago Horta, 79, Portuguese businessman and politician, MP (2002–2005). (death announced on this date)
- Jan Kostrhun, 79, Czech writer and politician, MP (1996–2002).
- Axel Leijonhufvud, 88, Swedish economist.
- Kailia Posey, 16, American beauty pageant and reality show contestant (Toddlers & Tiaras), suicide by hanging.
- Joseph Raz, 83, Israeli philosopher.
- Đuro Seder, 94, Croatian painter.
- John Richard Smoak Jr., 78, American federal jurist, Judge of the U.S. District Court for Northern Florida (since 2005).
- James V. Stanton, 90, American politician, member of the U.S. House of Representatives (1971–1977).
- Rob Stein, 78, American political strategist.
- John Stoffa, 82, American politician.
- Alzina Toups, 94, American chef.
- Norvald Tveit, 94, Norwegian writer and playwright.
- Radim Uzel, 82, Czech sexologist and academic, complications from stomach cancer.
- Yuri Vasenin, 73, Russian football player (Zaria Voroshilovgrad, Soviet Union national team) and manager (Baltika Kaliningrad).

=== 3 ===
- Egidio Alagna, 86, Italian politician, deputy (1983–1992).
- Véronique Barrault, 64, French actress (My True Love, My Wound, Lady Cops, Love and Fear), traffic collision.
- Javier Barrero, 72, Spanish politician, deputy (1982–2016), cancer.
- Jan Béghin, 72, Belgian politician, Flemish MP (1997–1999).
- Fran Boyd, 65, American drug counsellor.
- Tony Brooks, 90, British racing driver (Formula 1).
- Lino Capolicchio, 78, Italian actor (The Garden of the Finzi-Continis, The House with Laughing Windows, The Bloodstained Shadow) and director.
- Wink Davenport, 80, American Olympic volleyball player (1968).
- Francesco D'Agostino, 76, Italian jurist.
- Antonio T. de Nicolás, 91, Spanish-born American scholar and poet.
- Josef Fröwis, 85, Austrian Olympic sport shooter.
- Klaus Hirche, 82, German Olympic ice hockey player (1968).
- George Horvath, 62, Swedish pentathlete, Olympic bronze medalist (1980).
- Wilson Karunaratne, 79, Sri Lankan actor (One Shot, Vijaya Kuweni) and stunt director.
- Valeri Kocharov, 74, Georgian rock guitarist and singer, stroke.
- Julie Lutz, 77, American astronomer and mathematician.
- Ted Luscombe, 97, British Anglican prelate, bishop of Brechin (1975–1990).
- Andra Martin, 86, American actress (Up Periscope, The Thing That Couldn't Die, Yellowstone Kelly).
- Norman Mineta, 90, American politician, member of the U.S. House of Representatives (1975–1995), secretary of commerce (2000–2001) and transportation (2001–2006), heart disease.
- Meda Mládková, 102, Czech art collector.
- Lahcen Sekkouri, 69–70, Moroccan politician.
- Tim Shaffer, 76, American politician, member of the Pennsylvania State Senate (1981–1996).
- Stanislav Shushkevich, 87, Belarusian politician, chairman of the Supreme Council (1991–1994), complications from COVID-19.
- Hiroyuki Watanabe, 66, Japanese actor (Shinjuku Outlaw, Kamen Rider Den-O: I'm Born!, Garo), suicide by hanging.
- Bert Weaver, 90, American golfer.
- Carrie White, 78, American hairdresser, cancer.
- Mieke Wijaya, 83, Indonesian actress (Tiga Dara, Badai Pasti Berlalu, Verses of Love) and model.
- Yu Zhigang, 48, Chinese politician.

=== 4 ===
- Joaquin C. Arriola, 96, Guamanian attorney and politician, senator (1955–1959, 1967–1971) and speaker (1967–1971) of the legislature.
- Baek Nam-chi, 78, South Korean politician, MP (1988–2000).
- Richard Connolly, 94, Australian composer and musician.
- Anne de Leseleuc, 94, French writer, historian, and actress (Royal Affairs in Versailles, Charming Boys).
- Nguyễn Duy Quý, 90, Vietnamese academic and politician, MP (1992–2002).
- Mary Fuller, 99, American sculptor and art historian.
- Herschella Horton, 83, American politician, member of the Arizona House of Representatives (1991–2001).
- Albin Julius, 54, Austrian musician (Der Blutharsch).
- Charoen Khanthawong, 89, Thai politician, MP (1975–2014).
- Zbigniew Kicka, 72, Polish Olympic boxer (1976).
- Pamela Kosh, 93, British-American actress (Days of Our Lives, The King of Queens, Saved by the Bell).
- Józef Leśniak, 54, Polish politician, MP (2015–2019).
- Gerhard Mans, 60, Namibian rugby union player (Free State Cheetahs, South West Africa, national team), traffic collision.
- Donald McKellow, 96, British Olympic cyclist (1952).
- Kenny Moore, 78, American Olympic runner (1968, 1972).
- Harm Ottenbros, 78, Dutch racing cyclist, UCI Road World Champion (1969).
- Lalli Partinen, 80, Finnish Olympic ice hockey player (1968), COVID-19.
- Gunnar Pétursson, 92, Icelandic Olympic cross-country skier.
- Howie Pyro, 61, American punk bassist (D Generation), COVID-19.
- Odir Rocha, 81, Brazilian politician, deputy (1995) and mayor of Palmas (1997–2000).
- Hélène de Saint-Père, 58, French actress (Hôtel de France, Peau d'Ange, Vendredi soir).
- Juhani Salmenkylä, 90, Finnish Olympic basketball official (1964) and orienteering competitor, European relay champion (1964).
- Lars Skåål, 72, Swedish Olympic water polo player (1980).
- Géza Varasdi, 94, Hungarian athlete, Olympic bronze medallist (1952).
- Wukun Wanambi, 59, Australian Yolngu painter.
- Yuliya Voyevodina, 50, Russian Olympic racewalker (2004).

=== 5 ===
- Gary Allen, 76, New Zealand cricketer.
- Sir James Anderton, 89, British police officer, chief constable of Greater Manchester Police (1976–1991).
- Amanda Claridge, 72, British archaeologist, cancer.
- Justin Constantine, 52, American military officer, prostate cancer.
- Lamin Conteh, 45, Sierra Leonean footballer (Beerschot, Meppen, national team).
- Leonid Dukhovny, 83, Ukrainian-American singer-songwriter, fire.
- Serhiy Dyachenko, 77, Ukrainian writer and screenwriter (Dark Planet).
- David L. Fried, 89, American optical physicist.
- Mike Hagerty, 67, American actor (The George Carlin Show, Lucky Louie, Friends), antibiotic reaction.
- Bent Hansen, 89, Danish Olympic cyclist.
- Du'Vonta Lampkin, 25, American football player (Massachusetts Pirates), shot.
- David Humke, 73, American politician.
- José Manuel Liaño Flores, 100, Spanish lawyer and politician, member of Cortes Españolas (1967–1977) and mayor of A Coruña (1976–1979).
- Ronald Lopatny, 77, Croatian water polo player, Olympic champion (1968).
- Faye Marlowe, 95, American actress (Rendezvous with Annie, Hangover Square, Junior Miss).
- Gary Miller, 62, English musician, producer, and songwriter.
- Théodore Nzue Nguema, 48, Gabonese football player (Angers, national team) and manager (Estrellas del Futuro).
- František Plass, 78, Czech football player (Viktoria Plzeň, Czechoslovakia national team) and manager (Chmel Blšany).
- Regina Reyes Mandanas, 57, Filipino politician, member of the House of Representatives (2013–2016).
- Mario Roy, 71, Canadian journalist (La Presse).
- Kevin Samuels, 57, American internet personality.
- Gunnar Sandborg, 94, Norwegian Olympic rower (1948).
- Arthur Tonkin, 92, Australian politician, Western Australia MLA (1971–1987).
- José Félix Villarreal, 75-76, Mexican chess player, shot.
- José Luis Violeta, 81, Spanish footballer (Zaragoza, national team).
- Kenneth Welsh, 80, Canadian actor (Twin Peaks, The Aviator, The Day After Tomorrow), cancer.
- Leo Wilden, 85, German footballer (1. FC Köln, Bayer Leverkusen, West Germany national team).

=== 6 ===
- Clif Evans, 73, Canadian politician.
- Gabriel Garran, 95, French actor and director.
- Seán Garvey, 69, Irish traditional singer.
- Alan Gillis, 85, Irish farmers' leader and politician, MEP (1994–1999).
- Kostas Gousgounis, 91, Greek pornographic actor, heart attack.
- Helen Kleberg Groves, 94, American rancher.
- Alf Hambe, 91, Swedish author, composer, and singer-songwriter.
- George Huang, 86, Taiwanese politician, Changhua County magistrate (1981–1989) and chairman of the Central Election Commission (1994–1995, 1999–2004).
- Jewell, 53, American R&B singer.
- Bill Laskey, 79, American football player (Oakland Raiders, Baltimore Colts, Denver Broncos).
- Patricia A. McKillip, 74, American author (The Forgotten Beasts of Eld, Harpist in the Wind, Ombria in Shadow).
- Kelly Meafua, 31, Samoan rugby player (US Montauban), jumping from bridge.
- Ann Metzinger, 90, American nutritionist.
- Hajdar Muneka, 68, Albanian journalist and diplomat.
- John Akparibo Ndebugre, 72, Ghanaian politician, MP (2005–2009).
- George Pérez, 67, American comic book artist (The Avengers, Crisis on Infinite Earths, Teen Titans) and writer, pancreatic cancer.
- Mirosław Pietrewicz, 81, Polish economist and politician, minister of state treasury and deputy prime minister (1996–1997), MP (1997–2001).
- Ralph Polson, 92, American basketball player (Philadelphia Warriors, New York Knicks).
- Claude Provencher, 72, Canadian architect.
- Bojjala Gopala Krishna Reddy, 73, Indian politician, Andhra Pradesh MLA (1989–2004, since 2009), cardiac arrest.
- George Seals, 79, American football player (Chicago Bears, Kansas City Chiefs, Washington Redskins).
- Al Spalding, 89, American naval architect.
- Mark Sweeney, 62, American politician, member of the Montana Senate (since 2021).
- Marian van der Meer, 85, Dutch politician, senator (1983–1995).
- Dan Vitale, 66, American comedian and actor (Saturday Night Live).

=== 7 ===
- Mike Adamson, 74, American baseball player (Baltimore Orioles).
- Shah Jikrul Ahmad, 70, Bangladeshi politician, MP (2009–2014), heart attack.
- Antón Arieta, 76, Spanish footballer (Athletic Bilbao, Hércules, national team).
- Yuri Averbakh, 100, Russian chess grandmaster and author.
- Ihor Bedzai, 49, Ukrainian naval officer and pilot, shot down.
- Jürgen Blin, 79, German boxer, European heavyweight champion (1972).
- Kevin Corcoran, 90, Australian rules footballer (North Melbourne).
- Elisa Maria Damião, 75, Portuguese politician and trade union activist, MP (1987–1998), MEP (1998–2004).
- Fisseha Desta, 81, Ethiopian military officer and politician, vice president (1987–1991), heart disease.
- Donald Elson, 99, American film, stage and television actor.
- Suzi Gablik, 87, American artist, author and art critic.
- Mickey Gilley, 86, American country singer ("Room Full of Roses", "Don't the Girls All Get Prettier at Closing Time", "Stand by Me").
- Partha Ghosh, 81, Indian reciter.
- Marek Grabowski, 72, Polish doctor and politician.
- Kang Soo-yeon, 55, South Korean actress (The Surrogate Woman, Come Come Come Upward, All That Falls Has Wings), complications from cerebral hemorrhage.
- Jack Kehler, 75, American actor (The Big Lebowski, Men in Black II, Fever Pitch), complications from leukemia.
- Bruce MacVittie, 65, American actor (Million Dollar Baby, The Sopranos, American Buffalo).
- Jack McDonald, 92, Australian footballer (St Kilda).
- Francis J. Meehan, 98, American diplomat, United States ambassador to Czechoslovakia (1979–1980), Poland (1980–1983) and East Germany (1985–1988).
- Sir Paul Mellars, 82, British archaeologist.
- Simion Mironaș, 56, Romanian footballer (CSM Suceava, Gloria Bistrița, Olimpia Satu Mare).
- Dominique Mortemousque, 71, French politician, senator (2002–2008).
- Adel Al Mulla, 51, Qatari footballer (1992 Olympic team, national team), heart attack.
- Kwaku Ohene-Frempong, 76, Ghanaian physician, lung cancer.
- Al Papik, 95, American college football coach (Doane University) and administrator.
- Robin Parkinson, 92, English actor ('Allo 'Allo!, Button Moon, Twisted Nerve).
- Maria Radnoti-Alföldi, 95, Hungarian-German archaeologist and numismatist.
- Amadou Soumahoro, 68, Ivorian politician, president of the National Assembly (since 2019).

=== 8 ===
- André Arthur, 78, Canadian radio host and politician, MP (2006–2011).
- Paul Bladt, 90, French trade unionist and politician, deputy (1981–1986).
- Karl Bruggmann, 86, Swiss Olympic wrestler (1960).
- John Cherry, 73, American film director and screenwriter (Ernest Saves Christmas, Ernest Scared Stupid, Ernest Goes to Jail), complications from Parkinson's disease.
- Harry Dornbrand, 99, American aerospace engineer.
- Syd Farrimond, 81, English footballer (Bolton Wanderers, Tranmere Rovers, Halifax Town), complications from dementia.
- Michel Gervais, 77, Canadian university professor, rector of Université Laval (1987–1997).
- Robert Gillmor, 85, British wildlife artist and illustrator.
- Maria Gusakova, 91, Russian cross-country skier, Olympic champion (1960).
- Hidenori Hasegawa, 84, Japanese politician, member of the Tokyo Metropolitan Assembly (1989–1993).
- Bengt Johansson, 79, Swedish handball player and coach.
- Rajat Kumar Kar, 87, Indian playwright, non-fiction author and broadcaster, heart disease.
- Kim Chi-ha, 81, South Korean poet and playwright.
- Sunny Low, 82, Singaporean ballroom dancer and choreographer, brain haemorrhage.
- Arthur Nzeribe, 83, Nigerian politician, senator (1999–2007).
- Nigel F. Palmer, 75, British Germanist.
- Stefanos Petrakis, 97, Greek Olympic sprinter (1948, 1952).
- Mahendra Raj, 97, Indian engineer (Pragati Maidan, Indian Institute of Management Bangalore, Salar Jung Museum).
- Sunil Kanti Roy, 78, Indian businessman (Peerless Group).
- Antonio Salazar, 33, Mexican footballer (Guadalajara, Chiapas, Santos de Guápiles), burned.
- Ray Scott, 88, American angler, founder of the Bass Anglers Sportsman Society.
- Ľubor Štark, 69, Czech Olympic sprint canoeist.
- Robert J. Vlasic, 96, American executive (Vlasic Pickles, Henry Ford Hospital).
- Fred Ward, 79, American actor (Escape from Alcatraz, The Right Stuff, Tremors).
- Dennis Waterman, 74, English actor (Minder, The Sweeney, New Tricks) and singer, lung cancer.
- Zhuang Qiaosheng, 105, Chinese geneticist and wheat breeder, member of the Chinese Academy of Sciences.

=== 9 ===
- Amarakeerthi Athukorala, 57, Sri Lankan politician, MP (since 2020), beaten.
- Bob Barnard, 88, Australian jazz trumpeter.
- Robert Brom, 83, American Roman Catholic prelate, bishop of Duluth (1983–1989) and San Diego (1990–2013).
- John L. Canley, 84, American soldier, Medal of Honor recipient, cancer.
- Fred Carter, 83, American comic book artist (Chick Publications).
- John H. Coates, 77, Australian mathematician.
- Paolo Dalle Fratte, 70, Italian politician, deputy (2001–2006).
- Midge Decter, 94, American non-fiction writer.
- Denys Dubrov, 33, Ukrainian swimmer, four-time Paralympic champion (2016, 2020).
- Joan Gilmore, 94, American journalist (The Daily Oklahoman).
- Tadeusz Grygiel, 68, Polish basketball player (Śląsk Wrocław).
- Gerald Hannon, 77, Canadian journalist (The Body Politic).
- Olawale Adeniji Ige, 83, Nigerian electrical engineer, minister of communications (1990–1992) and aviation (1993).
- Tim Johnson, 75, American politician, member of the U.S. House of Representatives (2001–2013) and the Illinois House of Representatives (1977–2001).
- Rieko Kodama, 58, Japanese video game designer (Phantasy Star, 7th Dragon, Skies of Arcadia).
- Linda Lê, 58, French writer.
- John Leo, 86, American journalist (The New York Times).
- Jody Lukoki, 29, Dutch-Congolese footballer (Ajax, PFC Ludogorets Razgrad, DR Congolese national team), complications from injuries sustained in a beating.
- Andreas Lütkefels, 57, German Olympic rower (1988).
- David Lytton Cobbold, 2nd Baron Cobbold, 84, British hereditary peer, member of the House of Lords (2000–2014), complications from Parkinson's disease.
- Minoru Nojima, 76, Japanese classical pianist.
- Adreian Payne, 31, American basketball player (Atlanta Hawks, Minnesota Timberwolves, Juventas Utina), shot.
- Qin Yi, 100, Chinese actress (Far Away Love, Woman Basketball Player No. 5, Troubled Laughter).
- Norbert M. Samuelson, 86, American scholar.
- Inge Viett, 78, German militant (2 June Movement, Red Army Faction) and writer.
- Lily Chodidjah Wahid, 74, Indonesian politician, MP (2009–2013).
- Malcolm Walker, 78, American football player (Dallas Cowboys, Green Bay Packers), cancer.
- Davyd Zhvania, 54, Ukrainian politician, minister of emergency (2005) and deputy (2002–2014), shelling.

=== 10 ===
- Manuel Abreu, 63, French-Portuguese football player (Reims, Nancy) and manager (Calais).
- Jim Andreotti, 84, American football player (Toronto Argonauts, Montreal Alouettes).
- James A. Beckford, 79, British sociologist.
- Richard Benson, 67, British-Italian guitarist, singer and television host.
- Bob Blizzard, 71, British politician, MP (1997–2010), lord commissioner of the Treasury (2008–2010).
- Hanns-Peter Boehm, 94, German chemist.
- Doug Caldwell, 94, New Zealand jazz musician.
- Yung-Ping Chen, 91, Chinese-born American economist and gerontologist.
- John Cripps, 95, British-Australian horticulturalist (Cripps Pink).
- Mike Davis, 80, English rugby union player (Sherborne, national team) and coach.
- María Duval, 95, Argentine actress (Historia de una mala mujer).
- Nessim Gaon, 100, Sudanese-Swiss financier.
- Dick Garibaldi, 89, American college basketball player and coach.
- Walter Hirsch, 92, American basketball player (Kentucky Wildcats).
- Leonid Kravchuk, 88, Ukrainian politician, president (1991–1994), two-time people's deputy, and chairman of the Verkhovna Rada (1991).
- Bob Lanier, 73, American Hall of Fame basketball player (Detroit Pistons, Milwaukee Bucks) and coach (Golden State Warriors).
- Kjell Lönnå, 85, Swedish conductor, composer and television host.
- Jesús Mariñas, 79, Spanish journalist, bladder cancer.
- Enrique Metinides, 88, Mexican crime photographer.
- Jock O'Brien, 84, Australian footballer (North Melbourne, Ulverstone, Central District).
- Marcelo Pecci, 45, Paraguayan prosecutor, shot.
- Katsumoto Saotome, 90, Japanese author.
- Shivkumar Sharma, 84, Indian santoor player (Shiv–Hari) and composer (Chandni, Lamhe), cardiac arrest.
- Glyn Shaw, 71, Welsh rugby union (national team) and rugby league (Widnes, Wigan) player.
- Gideon Tinsley, 95, American politician, member of the Oklahoma Senate (1975–1983).
- Karl Van Roy, 83, American politician, member of the Wisconsin State Assembly (2003–2013).
- Richard Worth, 73, New Zealand politician, MP (1999–2009), minister of internal affairs (2008–2009).
- Peter Wu Junwei, 58, Chinese Roman Catholic prelate, prefect apostolic of Xinjiang (since 2010), heart attack.

=== 11 ===
- Shireen Abu Akleh, 51, Palestinian-American journalist (Al Jazeera), shot killed.
- Edward Arnett, 99, American chemist.
- Jim Asato, 94, American college football and baseball coach (Hawaii Rainbow Warrior).
- Peter Atkins, 86, British-born New Zealand Anglican priest, Bishop of Waiapu (1983–1990).
- Sam Basil, 52, Papua New Guinean politician, deputy prime minister (since 2020), MP (since 2007), and minister of finance (2019), traffic collision.
- William Bennett, 86, British flautist.
- Jeroen Brouwers, 82, Dutch writer.
- Patricia Cahill, 77, Irish singer.
- Clarence Dixon, 66, American murderer, execution by lethal injection.
- Norman Dolph, 83, American songwriter ("Life Is a Rock (But the Radio Rolled Me)") and record producer, cancer.
- Marilyn Fogel, 69, American geo-ecologist.
- Ivor Ganahl, 79, Swiss Olympic sailor.
- Paul Ginsborg, 76, British historian.
- Barbara Gloudon, 87, Jamaican journalist, author and playwright.
- George Gorton, 75, American political consultant, complications from Parkinson's disease.
- J. R. Gray, 83, American politician.
- Dallas Grider, 77, American football player and coach.
- Geraldine Grimes, 71, American education activist.
- Henk Groot, 84, Dutch footballer (Ajax Amsterdam, Feyenoord, national team).
- Ian Hall, 82, Guyanese-born British musician, composer and educator.
- Dick Hanley, 86, American Olympic swimmer.
- Margot Heuman, 94, German-born American Holocaust survivor.
- Philip L. Kohl, 75, American anthropologist.
- Harerangi Meihana, 88, New Zealand church leader.
- Sid Mittra, 91, Indian-American economist and academic.
- Tom Page, 91, American football coach (Sam Houston Bearkats).
- Claude Peter, 74, French basketball player (Le Mans Sarthe Basket, national team).
- June Preston, 93, American actress (Anne of Green Gables, Christmas in July), dementia.
- Sukh Ram, 94, Indian politician, minister of communications (1993–1996) and MP (1984–1998), stroke.
- Josef Šorm, 90, Czech Olympic volleyball player.
- Tracy B. Strong, 78, American philosopher.
- Alexander Toradze, 69, Georgian pianist.
- Ryuhei Ueshima, 61, Japanese comedian and actor, suicide by hanging.
- Randy Weaver, 74, American survivalist (Ruby Ridge).

=== 12 ===
- Haleh Afshar, Baroness Afshar, 77, British academic and politician, member of the House of Lords (since 2007).
- Juan Amat, 75, Spanish field hockey player, Olympic silver medalist (1980).
- Ruth Bishop, 89, Australian virologist.
- Gino Cappelletti, 88, American football player (Boston Patriots) and analyst.
- Bernard Carton, 74, French politician, deputy (1988–1993), complications from Alzheimer's disease.
- Luis Albeiro Cortés Rendón, 70, Colombian Roman Catholic prelate, bishop of Vélez (2003–2015) and auxiliary bishop of Pereira (since 2015).
- Kieran Egan, 79, Irish educational philosopher and author (The Educated Mind, Getting It Wrong from the Beginning, An Imaginative Approach to Teaching).
- Djalu Gurruwiwi, 86–87, Australian yidaki player.
- Leif Hansen, 87, Danish Olympic boxer.
- Larry Holley, 76, American college basketball coach (William Jewell Cardinals, Central Methodist Eagles, Northwest Missouri State Bearcats).
- Vannette W. Johnson, 91, American football coach.
- Ramesh Latke, 52, Indian politician, Maharashtra MLA (since 2014), heart attack.
- Paul Makler Sr., 101, American Olympic fencer (1952).
- Daniel Joseph Marion, 76, Canadian politician, commissioner of the Northwest Territories (1999–2000).
- Robert McFarlane, 84, American Marine Corps officer and politician, national security advisor (1983–1985), complications from lung disease.
- Cliff Michael, 88, Canadian politician.
- Henry Mollicone, 76, American composer.
- Brian Muggleton, 80, Australian cricketer (Western Australia).
- Rainer Nägele, 78, Liechtenstein-born American literary scholar.
- Francesco Nucara, 82, Italian politician, deputy (1983–1994, 2006–2013).
- Maria Pańczyk-Pozdziej, 80, Polish politician, senator (2005–2019).
- Giorgio Pasetto, 80, Italian politician, deputy (1996–2006), senator (2006–2008).
- Béla Petsco, 79, American writer (Nothing Very Important and Other Stories).
- Rodney Reid, 82, New Zealand footballer and cricketer.
- Vagish Shastri, 86, Indian grammarian and linguist.
- Alexei Tsvetkov, 75, Russian poet.
- Arnold Walker, 70, English rugby league player (Whitehaven, Workington Town, Cumbria), cancer.
- Arthuryne J. Welch-Taylor, 105, American educator.

=== 13 ===
- Wade Barber, 78, American lawyer and judge, complications from amyotrophic lateral sclerosis.
- Julie Beckett, 72, American teacher and disability rights activist, heart attack.
- Teresa Berganza, 89, Spanish mezzo-soprano.
- Bob Ciaffone, 81, American poker player.
- Karim Djoudi, 63, Algerian politician, minister of finance (2007–2014).
- Jean Faure, 85, French politician, senator (1983–2011).
- Maurice Fisher, 91, American baseball player (Cincinnati Redlegs).
- Ricky Gardiner, 73, Scottish guitarist (Beggars Opera) and composer.
- Arthur Getis, 87, American geographer.
- Sir Angus Grossart, 85, Scottish merchant banker and newspaper executive (Daily Record, Sunday Mail).
- Katsuhiko Kumazaki, 80, Japanese baseball administrator, commissioner of Nippon Professional Baseball (2014–2017), heart failure.
- Lil Keed, 24, American rapper ("Nameless"), liver and kidney failure.
- Jim Lyall, 76–77, Canadian politician, president of Nunatsiavut (2008–2012).
- Henry G. Martin, 70, English filmmaker.
- Alec Mathieson, 101, Australian football player (Geelong).
- Diane McGuinness, 89, American cognitive psychologist.
- Ben Roy Mottelson, 95, American-Danish nuclear physicist, Nobel Prize laureate (1975).
- Khalifa bin Zayed Al Nahyan, 73, Emirati royal and politician, president (since 2004) and ruler of Abu Dhabi (since 2004).
- Simon Preston, 83, English organist, conductor, and composer.
- João Rendeiro, 69, Portuguese banker, founder of Banco Privado Português, suicide by hanging.
- Ed Rynders, 62, American politician, member of the Georgia House of Representatives (2003–2019).
- Viktor Samokhin, 66, Russian football player (Spartak Moscow, CSKA, Soviet Union national team) and coach.
- Uri Savir, 69, Israeli politician, MK (1999–2001) and diplomat.
- Rosmarie Trapp, 93, Austrian-born American singer (Trapp Family).
- Brian Tripp, 77, American visual artist.
- Richard Wald, 92, American television executive (NBC News, ABC News) and journalist (New York Herald Tribune), complications from a stroke.
- Yang Hyong-sop, 96, North Korean politician, chairman of the Supreme People's Assembly (1983–1998), stroke.

=== 14 ===
- América Alonso, 85, Venezuelan actress.
- Andrei Babushkin, 58, Russian human rights activist, politician and publicist, pancreatitis.
- Bernard Bigot, 72, French physicist and civil servant, director general of ITER (since 2015).
- François Blais, 49, Canadian writer (Lac Adélard).
- Piero Carletto, 59, Italian Olympic rower (1988), cancer.
- Donal Courtney, 52, Irish actor, playwright and stage director.
- James Francis Edwards, 100, Canadian fighter pilot.
- Ramez Elmasri, 71, Egyptian-American computer scientist.
- Helen Fein, 87, American sociologist.
- Christian Giudicelli, 79, French novelist and literary critic.
- John W. Huffman, 89, American organic chemist.
- Peter Nicholas, 80, American businessman, co-founder of Boston Scientific, cancer.
- Jagadamba Prasad Nigam, 94, Indian politician.
- Valerio Onida, 86, Italian jurist, judge (1996–2005) and president (2004–2005) of the Constitutional Court.
- Serhii Parkhomenko, 25, Ukrainian military serviceman.
- Maxi Rolón, 27, Argentine footballer (FC Barcelona B, Coquimbo Unido, Fuerza Amarilla), traffic collision.
- Donald Kemp Ross, 78, American public interest lawyer and author.
- André Salifou, 80, Nigerien politician, Minister of Foreign Affairs (1996).
- Art Shurlock, 84, American Olympic gymnast (1964).
- Breno Silveira, 58, Brazilian film director (Two Sons of Francisco, Once Upon a Time in Rio).
- Andrew Symonds, 46, Australian cricketer (Queensland, Kent, national team), traffic collision.
- Urvashi Vaid, 63, Indian-American LGBT activist and author (Virtual Equality).
- David West, 57, American baseball player (Minnesota Twins, Philadelphia Phillies, New York Mets), brain cancer.
- Francesco Zerrillo, 91, Italian Roman Catholic prelate, bishop of Tricarico (1985–1997) and of Lucera-Troia (1997–2007).

=== 15 ===
- Harvey Achziger, 90, American football player (Hamilton Tiger-Cats) and businessman.
- Rainer Basedow, 83, German actor (My Daughter, Your Daughter, Three Men in the Snow, Lina Braake).
- Roland Bezamat, 97, French Olympic cyclist.
- Sir Shane Blewitt, 87, British courtier and military officer.
- Robert Cogoi, 82, Belgian singer.
- Frank Curry, 72, Australian rugby league player and coach (South Sydney).
- Pallavi Dey, 25, Indian actress (Kunjochaya, Saraswatir Prem).
- Jim Ferlo, 70, American politician, member of the Pennsylvania Senate (2003–2015).
- Deborah Fraser, 56, South African gospel singer, stroke.
- Hossein Ghafourizadeh, 78, Iranian Olympic sprinter (1964).
- Lidiya Glubokova, 68, Russian Olympic field hockey player.
- Go Gwi-nam, 88, South Korean politician, member of the National Assembly (1972–1988).
- Ignacy Gogolewski, 90, Polish actor (Three Stories, Tonight a City Will Die, The Codes).
- George Graham, 73, American politician, member of the North Carolina House of Representatives (2013–2019).
- Klara Höfels, 73, German actress (Toni Erdmann, Cut Off).
- Morris Kay, 89, American politician who served in the Kansas House of Representatives
- Tadeusz Kowalczyk, 89, Polish politician and Rural Solidarity activist, MP (1989–1993).
- Knox Martin, 99, Colombian-born American painter and sculptor.
- Kay Mellor, 71, British actress and writer (Children's Ward, Families, Fat Friends).
- David Milgaard, 69, Canadian prisoners' rights advocate, wrongfully convicted of rape and murder, complications from pneumonia.
- Salah Montaser, 88, Egyptian writer and journalist.
- Ken Mulhall, 94, Australian footballer (St Kilda Football Club).
- Martin Munyanyi, 66, Zimbabwean Roman Catholic prelate, bishop of Gweru (2006–2012).
- John Mutton, 74, British politician, member of Coventry City Council (since 1984).
- Stevan Ostojić, 80, Serbian footballer (Red Star Belgrade, Yugoslavia national team).
- Maggie Peterson, 81, American actress (The Andy Griffith Show, The Bill Dana Show) and location manager (Casino).
- Dhu al-Himma Shalish, 71, Syrian military officer.
- Sean Shanahan, 71, Canadian ice hockey player (Montreal Canadiens, Colorado Rockies, Boston Bruins).
- Eugene Saloom, 87, American politician, three-time member of the Pennsylvania House of Representatives.
- Yoshie Takahashi, 90, Japanese Olympic long jumper (1956) and sports administrator, stroke.
- Jerzy Trela, 80, Polish actor (Man of Iron, Danton, The Mother of Kings).
- Șerban Valeca, 65, Romanian engineer and politician, deputy (2000) and senator (2008–2020).
- E. Robert Wallach, 88, American lawyer.

=== 16 ===
- Josef Abrhám, 82, Czech actor (Transport from Paradise, Courage for Every Day, Morgiana).
- John Aylward, 75, American actor (ER, The West Wing, The Way Back).
- Iann Barron, 85, British computer programmer and entrepreneur.
- William N. Dunn, 83, American international relations scholar.
- Seyyed Abdollah Fateminia, 76, Iranian Islamic cleric.
- Feng Jianshen, 69, Chinese politician, CPPCC chairman of Gansu (2011–2018).
- Lothar Gaa, 91, German politician, member of the Landtag of Baden-Württemberg (1968–1984).
- Algis Ignatavicius, 89, Lithuanian-born Australian Olympic basketball player (1956).
- Hilarion Kapral, 74, Canadian-born American Russian Orthodox prelate, first hierarch of the ROCOR (since 2008).
- Klaus-Michael Körner, 69, German politician, member of the Landtag of Mecklenburg-Vorpommern (1998–2011).
- Sidney Kramer, 96, American politician, member of the Maryland Senate (1978–1986).
- David LeMaster, 73, American politician.
- David MacMichael, 95, American whistleblower.
- Albin Molnár, 86, Hungarian Olympic sailor (1960).
- Kjellaug Nakkim, 81, Norwegian politician, MP (1989–2001).
- Ademola Okulaja, 46, Nigerian-born German basketball player (Alba Berlin, FC Barcelona, Brose Baskets).
- Carol Ann Peters, 89, American figure skater and ice dancer.
- Epaminondas Stassinopoulos, 101, German-born American astrophysicist, writer, and World War II resistance member (EKKA).
- Esteban Villa, 91, American artist.

=== 17 ===
- Muhammad Baydoun, 70, Lebanese politician, MP (1992–2005).
- Robert Bertrand, 69, Canadian politician, MP (1993–2004).
- E. Gerald Corrigan, 80, American banker, president of the Federal Reserve Bank of New York (1985–1993), complications from Alzheimer's disease.
- Kristine Gebbie, 78, American academic and public health official, White House AIDS policy coordinator (1993–1994).
- Jeong Rae-hyuk, 96, South Korean military officer and politician, defense minister (1970–1971), MP (1973–1985).
- Marvin Josephson, 95, American talent manager, founder of ICM Partners.
- Rolands Kalniņš, 100, Latvian film director (I Remember Everything, Richard, Four White Shirts), screenwriter, and producer.
- Johan Kleppe, 93, Norwegian politician, MP (1969–1973) and minister of defence (1972–1973).
- Maurice Lindsay, 81, British sports administrator (Preston North End, Wigan Warriors).
- Eliseo Mendoza Berrueto, 91, Mexican politician, president of the Chamber of Deputies (1985) and governor of Coahuila (1987–1993).
- Antonio Oviedo, 83, Spanish football player (Mallorca, Elche) and manager (Atlético Baleares).
- Rick Price, 77, English bassist (The Move, Wizzard).
- Mohamed Rabbae, 81, Moroccan-born Dutch politician and activist, MP (1994–2002).
- Rodri, 88, Spanish footballer (Condal, Barcelona, national team).
- Marnie Schulenburg, 37, American actress (As the World Turns, One Life to Live, Tainted Dreams), breast cancer.
- Thomas Smith, 90, American Olympic sport shooter (1964).
- Vangelis, 79, Greek musician (Aphrodite's Child) and film composer (Chariots of Fire, Blade Runner), Oscar winner (1982), heart failure.

=== 18 ===
- Alexander Astin, 89, American educator and writer.
- Miguel Báez Espuny, 91, Spanish bullfighter and actor (Litri and His Shadow).
- Brian Bedford, 88, Welsh footballer (AFC Bournemouth, Queens Park Rangers, Scunthorpe United).
- Cathal Coughlan, 61, Irish singer-songwriter (Microdisney, The Fatima Mansions).
- DeLos F. DeTar, 102, American chemist.
- Fernando Guimarães Kevanu, 85, Angolan Roman Catholic prelate, bishop of Ondjiva (1988–2011).
- Anne Howells, 81, British operatic mezzo-soprano, myeloma.
- Werner Israel, 90, German-born South African-Canadian physicist.
- Jim Kelly, 80, American football player (Pittsburgh Steelers, Philadelphia Eagles).
- Larry Lacewell, 85, American football player (Arkansas–Monticello Boll Weevils), coach (Arkansas State Indians) and scouting director (Dallas Cowboys).
- A. C. M. Lafir, 86, Sri Lankan cricketer (Ceylon).
- Linda Lawson, 86, American actress (Sometimes a Great Notion, Night Tide, Adventures in Paradise).
- Peter Maitlis, 89, British chemist.
- Faouzi Mansouri, 66, Algerian footballer (Nîmes, Mulhouse, national team).
- Henry Mavrodin, 84, Romanian painter, designer and essayist.
- Mpho Moerane, 52, South African restaurateur and politician, mayor of Johannesburg (2021), traffic collision.
- Bob Neuwirth, 82, American singer-songwriter ("Mercedes Benz").
- Raoul Pleskow, 91, Austrian-born American composer.
- Paul Plimley, 69, Canadian free jazz pianist and vibraphonist, cancer.
- Bobby Ply, 81, American football player (Dallas Texans/Kansas City Chiefs, Buffalo Bills, Denver Broncos).
- Thomas Resetarits, 82, Austrian sculptor.
- Alf Saltveit, 75, Norwegian poet and novelist.
- Steven Seifert, 72, American medical toxicologist.
- Sam Smith, 78, American basketball player (Kentucky Colonels).
- Martin Šustr, 31, Czech footballer (Zbrojovka Brno, Vítkovice, Líšeň), traffic collision.
- Domingo Villar, 51, Spanish writer (Death on a Galician Shore), complications from a stroke.

=== 19 ===
- Sheherezade Alam, 74, Pakistani ceramist.
- Les Brownlee, 82, American colonel and politician.
- Abdul Gaffar Chowdhury, 87, Bangladeshi-born British journalist and songwriter ("Ekusher Gaan").
- Jean-Louis Comolli, 80, French film critic (Cahiers du Cinéma) and director.
- Aseff Ahmad Daula, 81, Pakistani politician, minister of foreign affairs (1993–1996) and education (2008–2010).
- Joseph F. Hoffman, 97, American scientist and academic.
- Mavis Hutchison, 97, South African athlete.
- Hyon Chol-hae, 87, North Korean military officer, vice director of the GPB (1986–1995), multiple organ failure.
- William Lancaster, 84, British social anthropologist.
- Chete Lera, 72, Spanish actor (The Red Squirrel, Secrets of the Heart, Open Your Eyes), traffic collision.
- John Ralston Marr, 94, British Indologist.
- Neil O'Donnell, 72, Scottish footballer (Norwich City, Sheffield Wednesday).
- Stan Openshaw, 75, British geographer.
- Pamela Sharples, Baroness Sharples, 99, British life peer, member of the House of Lords (1973–2017).
- George Shepherd, 84, Canadian Olympic hurdler (1960).
- Michael Sze, 76, Hong Kong civil servant, secretary for constitutional affairs (1991–1994) and executive director of the Trade Development Council (1996–2004).
- Jack Taggart, 72, Canadian ice hockey player.
- Bernard Wright, 58, American funk and jazz singer ("Who Do You Love"), traffic collision.

=== 20 ===
- Muthaffar al-Nawab, 88, Iraqi poet and political critic.
- Roger Angell, 101, American sportswriter and author (Season Ticket: A Baseball Companion), heart failure.
- Glenys Arthur, 86, New Zealand neurologist.
- Ahmed Benaissa, 78, Algerian actor (Barakat!, Rome Rather Than You, The Colonel).
- Sir Colin Campbell, 77, British lawyer, vice-chancellor of the University of Nottingham (1988–2008).
- Griselda El Tayib, 97, British-born Sudanese writer and cultural anthropologist.
- Jeffrey Escoffier, 79, American author and activist.
- Sir Edward Evans-Lombe, 85, British judge.
- Tony Fitzjohn, 76, British conservationist, cancer.
- Glenn Hackney, 97, American politician, member of the Alaska House of Representatives (1973–1977) and Senate (1977–1981), traffic collision.
- Yuri Javadyan, 87, Armenian politician.
- Caroline Jones, 84, Australian broadcaster (This Day Tonight, Four Corners, Australian Story), fall.
- Eugenio López Rodea, 87, Mexican business executive, founder of Jumex.
- Calvin Magee, 59, American football player (Tampa Bay Buccaneers) and coach (Arizona Wildcats, West Virginia Mountaineers), complications from a heart attack.
- Vladimir Nenadić, 51, Serbian footballer (Bečej, Vojvodina, 1. FC Tatran).
- Camille Ninel, 94, French footballer (Olympique Lyonnais, Moulins).
- Ed Nutting, 83, American football player (Dallas Cowboys, Cleveland Browns).
- Hillar Palamets, 94, Estonian historian.
- Betty Reed, 81, American politician, member of the Florida House of Representatives (2006–2014).
- Dame Aroha Reriti-Crofts, 83, New Zealand community activist, president of the Māori Women's Welfare League (1990–1993).
- Susan Roces, 80, Filipino actress (Ang Daigdig Ko'y Ikaw, Patayin Mo Sa Sindak Si Barbara, Ang Probinsyano), cardiopulmonary arrest.
- Domina Eberle Spencer, 101, American mathematician. (death announced on this date)
- Bruce Tabb, 95, American-born New Zealand accountancy academic.
- Corky Taylor, 88, American football player (Los Angeles Rams).
- Kirill Teiter, 69, Estonian politician, MP (1992–1995).

=== 21 ===
- John Brillhart, 91, American mathematician.
- Colin Cantwell, 90, American film concept artist (2001: A Space Odyssey, Star Wars, WarGames).
- Marco Cornez, 64, Chilean footballer (Club Deportivo Palestino, Antofagasta, national team), stomach cancer.
- Hubert Fermina, 74, Dutch politician, member of the House of Representatives (1994–1998).
- David Forbes, 88, Australian sailor, Olympic champion (1972).
- Fon Angwafo III of Mankon, 97, Cameroonian traditional ruler, MP (1962–1988).
- Jane Haist, 73, Canadian Olympic discus thrower (1976).
- Heddy Honigmann, 70, Peruvian-born Dutch film director (O Amor Natural, Crazy, Goodbye).
- Enric Marco, 101, Spanish union worker and fake Holocaust survivor.
- Peter Koper, 75, American journalist, screenwriter (Headless Body in Topless Bar, Island of the Dead) and producer.
- Rosemary Radford Ruether, 85, American feminist theologian.
- Tota Singh, 81, Indian politician, Punjab MLA (1997–2007, 2012–2017), complications from pneumonia.
- Tania Tinoco, 58, Ecuadorian journalist, author, and television producer.
- Emil Aloysius Wcela, 91, American Roman Catholic prelate, auxiliary bishop of Rockville Centre (1988–2007).
- Gordie Windhorn, 88, American baseball player (New York Yankees).
- Yam Bing-yee, 90, Hong Kong Cantonese opera singer and actress.
- Achmad Yurianto, 60, Indonesian military doctor and bureaucrat.
- Jiří Zídek Sr., 78, Czech Hall of Fame Olympic basketball player (1972) and coach.
- Nikolai Zouev, 64, Russian mixed martial artist, heart disease.

=== 22 ===
- Kanamat Botashev, 63, Russian major general.
- Harold Brookfield, 96, British-Australian geographer.
- John Burton, 78, British conservationist and author.
- Alberte de Campou, 86, French Olympic sprinter.
- Doug Carswell, 86, New Zealand cricketer.
- John Clarke, 87, Canadian Olympic sailor (1972).
- Don Collins, 69, American baseball player (Atlanta Braves, Cleveland Indians).
- József Duró, 55, Hungarian football player (Debreceni VSC, national team) and manager (Vecsési).
- Les Dyl, 69, English rugby league player (Leeds Rhinos, Bramley, national team).
- Colin Forbes, 94, British graphic designer.
- Joe Hawke, 82, New Zealand Māori activist and politician, MP (1996–2002).
- Hazel Henderson, 89, British-American futurist and economist.
- Eduard Hercigonja, 92, Croatian philologist, Croatist and literary historian.
- Julian Hochberg, 98, American psychology researcher.
- Takashi Ishii, 75, Japanese film director (Original Sin, Freeze Me, Gonin Saga) and manga artist, cancer.
- Duberildo Jaque, 101, Chilean lawyer and politician, deputy (1961–1973).
- Greg Jein, 76, American visual effects artist (Close Encounters of the Third Kind, Avatar, Star Trek).
- Mohammad Ebrahim Khedri, 84, Afghan four-time Olympic wrestler.
- Andrew Krystal, 62, Canadian news anchor and radio host.
- Lee Lawson, 80, American actress (Guiding Light, One Life to Live, Love of Life), cancer and COVID-19.
- Rodrigo Lozano de la Fuente, 101, Spanish politician, senator (1977–1979).
- John M. Merriman, 75, American historian.
- Miss.Tic, 66, French street artist.
- Dervla Murphy, 90, Irish travel writer (Full Tilt: Ireland to India with a Bicycle) and cyclist.
- Andréi Nakov, 80, French-Bulgarian art historian.
- Oemarsono, 82, Indonesian civil servant and politician, governor of Lampung (1998–2003).
- S. Eugene Poteat, 92, American CIA executive.
- Bonar Sianturi, 77, Indonesian military officer.
- Jaakko Syrjä, 96, Finnish writer, COVID-19.
- Minute Alapati Taupo, 60, Tuvaluan politician, deputy prime minister (since 2019), ambassador to Taiwan (2013–2017).
- Peter Lamborn Wilson, 76, American anarchist author and poet (Temporary Autonomous Zone).
- Evangeline Parsons Yazzie, 75, American Navajo educator and author.

=== 23 ===
- Jamie Bartlett, 55, English-born South African actor (American Ninja 2: The Confrontation, Ernest Goes to Africa, Mandela: Long Walk to Freedom), cardiac arrest.
- Thom Bresh, 74, American country guitarist and singer, esophageal cancer.
- Élie Buzyn, 93, Polish-born French surgeon and Holocaust survivor.
- Don G. Despain, 81, American botanist and plant ecologist.
- Caroline Drummond, 58, British environmental executive and agriculturalist, cancer.
- Francesco Ferrari, 75, Italian politician, MP (1992–2001) and MEP (2007–2009).
- Anita Gradin, 88, Swedish politician, MP (1969–1992) and member of the European Commission (1995–1999).
- Ira A. Hunt Jr., 97, American major general.
- Swarna Kahawita, 75, Sri Lankan film actress (Binaramalee).
- Maja Lidia Kossakowska, 50, Polish fantasy writer, house fire.
- Kathleen Lavoie, 72, American microbiologist and explorer.
- Sergei Loginov, 58, Russian football player (Dinamo Leningrad).
- Sivaji Patnaik, 91, Indian politician, MP (1977–1980, 1989–1996).
- Joe Pignatano, 92, American baseball player (Los Angeles Dodgers, Kansas City Athletics) and coach (New York Mets), World Series champion (1959, 1969), complications from dementia.
- Nancy Clark Reynolds, 94, American television journalist and press secreatary (Ronald Reagan).
- Horst Sachtleben, 91, German actor (Beyond Silence, About a Girl).
- Ilkka Suominen, 83, Finnish politician, speaker of the Parliament (1987, 1991–1993) and president of the Nordic Council (1992).
- Benedicta Ward, 89, British Anglican nun, theologian and historian.
- Wendell, 74, Brazilian football player (Santa Cruz, Botafogo, national team) and manager.
- Zaw Htay, 48, Burmese politician, spokesman of the President Office (2011–2016), heart attack.

=== 24 ===
- Fred Aftalion, 100, French chemical engineer.
- Vladimir Averchev, 75, Russian politician, deputy (1993–2000).
- Don Edward Beck, 85, American psychologist (Spiral Dynamics).
- Luis Calderón, 92, Peruvian footballer (Club Carlos Concha, Sport Boys, national team).
- Gennaro Cannavacciuolo, 60, Italian actor (Un'estate al mare, La vita è una cosa meravigliosa), singer and comedian.
- David Datuna, 48, Georgian-born American artist, lung cancer.
- Hugh Dempsey, 92, Canadian historian and author.
- Kent Floerke, 86, American Olympic triple jumper.
- Alfred Grishin, 81, Russian boxing coach.
- Hamid Yusif Hummadi, 87, Iraqi politician, minister of culture and information (1991–1996).
- Tadeusz Jankowski, 92, Polish Olympic cross-country skier (1964).
- Sajjad Kishwar, 88, Pakistani actor (Zanjeer, Khoon Aur Paani, Janbaaz).
- Ouka Leele, 64, Spanish photographer, cancer.
- Bob Miller, 86, American baseball player (Detroit Tigers, Cincinnati Reds, New York Mets).
- Martha Myers, 97, American dance educator.
- Khyongla Rato, 98–99, Tibetan Buddhist scholar, founder of The Tibet Center.
- Maurizio Silvi, 75, Italian makeup artist (Moulin Rouge!, Gangs of New York, The Great Gatsby).
- Bill Sloan, 87, Canadian-born American ice hockey player.
- Derek Stokes, 82, English footballer (Huddersfield Town, Bradford City, Dundalk).
- John Thompson, 95, American football executive (Minnesota Vikings, Seattle Seahawks).
- Thomas Ulsrud, 50, Norwegian curler, Olympic silver medalist (2010), cancer.

=== 25 ===
- Toby Berger, 81, American information theorist.
- Jean-Louis Chautemps, 90, French jazz saxophonist.
- Paul Cloke, 69, New Zealand geographer.
- Dick Conway, 87, New Zealand rugby union player (Otago, Bay of Plenty, national team).
- Wies van Dongen, 90, Dutch racing cyclist.
- Allie Eagle, 73, New Zealand artist.
- Luis Guillermo Eichhorn, 79, Argentine Roman Catholic prelate, bishop of Gualeguaychú (1996–2004) and Morón (2004–2017), cardiac arrest.
- Lívia Gyarmathy, 90, Hungarian film director and screenwriter.
- Eldon C. Hall, 98, American computer scientist.
- Morton L. Janklow, 91, American literary agent, heart failure.
- Jack Kaiser, 95, American athletics coach (Oneonta Red Sox, Roanoke Red Sox) and administrator (St. John's Red Storm).
- Eduardo Lizalde, 92, Mexican poet.
- Thomas Murphy, 96, American broadcasting executive.
- Gary Nelson, 87, American film and television director (Freaky Friday, The Black Hole, Washington: Behind Closed Doors).
- Pinchas Stolper, 91, American Orthodox rabbi.

=== 26 ===
- José Antolín Toledano, 86, Spanish industrialist.
- Aldiglade Bhamu, 34, Zimbabwean footballer (national team).
- Sir Arnold Burgen, 100, British physician, pharmacologist and academic.
- Ciriaco De Mita, 94, Italian politician, prime minister (1988–1989), two-time deputy, and minister of industry (1973–1974), complications from a fall.
- John Dodson, 3rd Baron Monk Bretton, 97, British hereditary peer, member of the House of Lords (1948–1999).
- Andy Fletcher, 60, English Hall of Fame keyboardist (Depeche Mode), aortic dissection.
- Willibrord Frequin, 80, Dutch journalist and television presenter, complications from Parkinson's disease.
- Jennifer Holden, 85, American actress (Jailhouse Rock, Buchanan Rides Alone, Gang War).
- Richard D. Johnson, 87, American accountant, Iowa state auditor (1979–2003).
- Ann Johnston, 86, Canadian Olympic figure skater (1956).
- Ray Liotta, 67, American actor (Goodfellas, Something Wild, Field of Dreams), Emmy winner (2005), respiratory and heart failure.
- Drew McDermott, 72, American computer scientist.
- Kay McFarland, 84, American football player (San Francisco 49ers), complications from Parkinson's disease.
- Claude Michelet, 83, French writer.
- Luis Montaño, 71, Colombian Olympic footballer.
- Yuri Morozov, 84, Russian ice hockey player (Khimik Moscow Oblast) and coach.
- Elizabeth Raspolic, 83, American diplomat, ambassador to Gabon and São Tomé and Príncipe (1995–1998).
- Phillip Ritzenberg, 90, American journalist (New York Daily News, The Jewish Week), cancer.
- Johannes W. Rohen, 100, German anatomist.
- Sergei Romanovtsev, 96, Russian military and intelligence officer.
- George Shapiro, 91, American talent manager (Carl Reiner, Andy Kaufman) and television producer (Seinfeld).
- Shin Il-ryong, 73, South Korean actor (Ghosts of Chosun, Long Live the Island Frogs).
- Enyu Todorov, 79, Bulgarian freestyle wrestler, Olympic silver medallist (1968).
- Bill Walker, 95, Australian-born American composer and conductor.
- Alan White, 72, English Hall of Fame drummer (Yes, Plastic Ono Band).
- Jimmy Whitehouse, 87, English footballer (Reading).
- Andrew Wyllie, 77, British pathologist.
- Jan Zaprudnik, 95, Belarusian-American historian and publicist.

=== 27 ===
- Alex Beaton, 77, Scottish folk singer and guitarist.
- Guido Bonino, 91, Italian politician, president of the Province of Cuneo (1985–1988).
- Jean Carrère, 92, French rugby union player (RC Toulonnais, national team).
- Gautam Chakroborty, 68, Bangladeshi politician, MP (1996–2006), state minister of water resources (2001–2006), cardiac arrest.
- Don Goldstein, 84, American college basketball player (University of Louisville).
- Shulamit Goldstein, 54, Israeli Olympic rhythmic gymnast (1988).
- Kirsten Hughes, 59, British actress (Jane and the Lost City).
- Arlene Kotil, 88, American baseball player (South Bend Blue Sox).
- John Lanzendorf, 76, American hairstylist and art collector, complications following surgery.
- Samella Lewis, 99, American visual artist and art historian, kidney failure.
- Ahmad Syafi'i Maarif, 86, Indonesian Islamic scholar and philanthropist, leader of Muhammadiyah (1998–2005), heart disease.
- Juan José Mosalini, 78, Argentine bandoneon player.
- Bill Mulich, 96, American politician, member of the Kansas House of Representatives (1969–1972) and senate (1973–1988).
- Stellan Olsson, 85, Swedish film director (Sven Klangs kvintett).
- Ray Pleasant, 94, American politician, member of the Minnesota House of Representatives (1973–1980).
- Gordon Proudfoot, 91, Australian footballer (Fitzroy).
- Marko Račič, 102, Slovenian Olympic athlete (1948).
- Twyla Ring, 84, American politician, member of the Minnesota Senate (1999–2002).
- Claude Rutault, 80, French painter.
- Neal Salisbury, 81-82, American historian.
- Fayez Sarofim, 93, Egyptian-American sports team owner (Houston Texans).
- Michael Sela, 98, Polish-born Israeli immunologist.
- Angelo Sodano, 94, Italian Roman Catholic cardinal, cardinal secretary of state (1991–2006) and dean of the College of Cardinals (2005–2019), COVID-19.
- Ype Stelma, 86, Dutch Olympic rower.
- Jim Wallis, 80, Australian footballer (St Kilda).
- Paul Wenzel, 87, American artist.
- Ramón Wiltz, 95, Cuban Olympic basketball player.

=== 28 ===
- Walter Abish, 90, Austrian-born American author (Alphabetical Africa, How German Is It).
- Patricia Brake, 79, English actress (Eldorado, The Ugliest Girl in Town, Coronation Street), cancer.
- Evaristo Carvalho, 80, São Toméan politician, president (2016–2021) and prime minister (1994, 2001–2002).
- Janine Charbonnier, 95, French pianist and composer.
- Mary Everard, 79, English amateur golfer.
- Rudolf Golosov, 94, Russian naval officer.
- Joanie Greggains, 78, American fitness instructor.
- Péter Haumann, 81, Hungarian actor (Ten Thousand Days, Woyzeck, Kalandorok).
- Bo Hopkins, 84, American actor (The Wild Bunch, American Graffiti, Dynasty), complications from a heart attack.
- Ivandro Cunha Lima, 92, Brazilian lawyer and politician, senator (1977–1982).
- Christopher Kuruneri, 73, Zimbabwean politician, minister of finance (2004), diabetes.
- Marino Masé, 83, Italian actor (Fists in the Pocket, The Carabineers, Il Boss), heart attack.
- Bujar Nishani, 55, Albanian politician, president (2012–2017), minister of justice (2009–2011) and twice minister of the interior, complications from COVID-19.
- Masanori Nishio, 73, Japanese politician, mayor of Hakodate (2007–2011).
- Yves Piétrasanta, 82, French politician, MEP (1999–2004), mayor of Mèze (1977–2001).
- Bobby Ross, 80, Scottish footballer (Grimsby Town, St. Mirren, East Fife).
- David Vardanyan, 72, Armenian politician, member of the supreme council (1990–1995) and national assembly (1995–1999).
- Ernesto Vecchi, 86, Italian Roman Catholic prelate, auxiliary bishop of Bologna (1998–2011) and apostolic administrator of Terni-Narni-Amelia (2013–2014).
- Victor von Halem, 82, German operatic bass singer (Deutsche Oper Berlin).
- Sheikh Ali Warsame, 83, Somali Islamic cleric and preacher.

=== 29 ===
- Ariel Besse, 56, French actress (Beau Pere).
- Antônio Augusto Cançado Trindade, 74, Brazilian jurist, judge of the International Court of Justice (since 2009).
- Dwayne Crompton, 75, American educator, president of the National Association for the Education of Young Children (2005).
- Virgil Dridea, 81, Romanian football player (Petrolul Ploiești) and manager (Plopeni, Dacia Unirea Brăila).
- Fred, 73, Brazilian footballer (1972 Olympic team, Flamengo, national team).
- Tarzan Goto, 58, Japanese professional wrestler (FMW, CWA, AJPW), liver cancer.
- Steven Gluckstern, 71, American entrepreneur.
- Ronnie Hawkins, 87, American-Canadian rock and roll singer-songwriter.
- Richard Herr, 100, American historian.
- Vivian Davidson Hewitt, 102, American art collector and librarian.
- Minoru Iizuka, 89, Japanese Olympic wrestler.
- Ausma Kantāne-Ziedone, 80, Latvian actress and politician, MP (2002–2010).
- Maria Mirecka-Loryś, 106, Polish World War II resistance member.
- Joel Moses, 80, Israeli-American mathematician and computer scientist (Macsyma).
- Sidhu Moose Wala, 28, Indian singer ("47"), actor (Moosa Jatt, Yes I Am Student) and politician, shot.
- Osayuki Godwin Oshodin, 71, Beninese academic administrator, vice-chancellor of University of Benin (2009–2014).
- Lester Piggott, 86, English jockey, nine-time Epsom Derby winner.
- Sarah Ramsey, 83, American thoroughbred horse breeder.
- Ivan Renar, 85, French politician, senator (1985–2011).
- Alden Roche, 77, American football player (Denver Broncos, Green Bay Packers, Seattle Seahawks).
- Stan Rodger, 82, New Zealand politician, MP (1978–1990), minister of labour (1984–1990).
- Raquel Seruca, 59, Portuguese oncobiologist.
- Kasia Al Thani, 45, American-born Qatari royal.
- Yanci Urbina, 58, Salvadoran politician, deputy (2018–2021), heart attack.
- Gary Winram, 85, Australian Olympic swimmer (1956).
- Tony Zarb, 68, Maltese trade unionist, secretary general of General Workers' Union (1998–2015).

=== 30 ===
- Miangul Adnan Aurangzeb, 61, Pakistani politician, MNA (1997–1999), traffic collision.
- John G. Cawelti, 92, American author.
- Friedrich Christian Delius, 79, German writer.
- Craig Farrell, 39, English footballer (Carlisle United, York City, Whitby Town).
- Jeff Gladney, 25, American football player (Minnesota Vikings, TCU Horned Frogs), traffic collision.
- Milton Gonçalves, 88, Brazilian actor (Kiss of the Spider Woman, Subway to the Stars, Moon over Parador) and television director, complications from a stroke.
- David Holford, 82, Barbadian cricketer (West Indies).
- Mary Jackman, 79, Irish politician, senator (1989–1992, 1997–2002).
- Mariusz Linke, 52, Polish mixed martial artist and grappler.
- William Lucas, 93, American politician, sheriff (1969–1983) and executive (1983–1987) of Wayne County, Michigan.
- Morio Matsui, 79, Japanese artist, heart disease.
- Jacques Nicolaou, 91, French comic book author.
- Ramses Ohee, 90, Indonesian politician.
- Boris Pahor, 108, Slovenian writer (Necropolis) and Holocaust survivor.
- Charles A. Rose, 91, American politician, mayor of Chattanooga (1975–1983).
- Roger Shepard, 93, American cognitive scientist and author.
- Costen Shockley, 80, American baseball player (Philadelphia Phillies, Los Angeles Angels).
- Carlo Smuraglia, 98, Italian politician and partisan, senator (1992–2001) and president of ANPI (2011–2017).
- Sir William Sutherland, 88, Scottish police officer, chief constable of Bedfordshire Police (1979–1983) and Lothian and Borders Police (1983–1996), chief inspector of constabulary of Scotland (1996–1998).
- Bob Talamini, 83, American football player (Houston Oilers, New York Jets).
- Sean Thackrey, 79, American winemaker, cancer.
- Paul Vance, 92, American songwriter ("Catch a Falling Star", "Itsy Bitsy Teenie Weenie Yellow Polkadot Bikini", "Tracy") and record producer.
- Pat Yankee, 94, American singer.

=== 31 ===
- Lawrence D. Ackman, 83, American real estate agent.
- Ahn Byong-man, 81, South Korean academic administrator, president of Hankuk University of Foreign Studies (1994–2004).
- Ted Alvarez Jr., 92, American politician.
- Ian Bentley, 66, English Anglican priest, archdeacon of Lynn (2018–2022), liver cancer.
- Paul Brass, 85, American political scientist and academic.
- Bart Bryant, 59, American golfer, traffic collision.
- Maurice Cooreman, 79, Belgian football manager (Kaduna United).
- Dave "Baby" Cortez, 83, American pianist and organist ("The Happy Organ").
- Kenneth W. Dam, 89, American politician, secretary of the treasury (2002–2003).
- Andrée Geulen, 100, Belgian philanthropist.
- Sir Brian Hayes, 93, British civil servant, Permanent Secretary at the Ministry of Agriculture, Fisheries and Food (1978–1983).
- Larry Hillman, 85, Canadian ice hockey player (Toronto Maple Leafs, Boston Bruins, Detroit Red Wings).
- Egbert Hirschfelder, 79, German rower, Olympic champion (1964, 1968).
- Gregory Eebolawola Kpiebaya, 89, Ghanaian Roman Catholic prelate, bishop of Wa (1974–1994) and archbishop of Tamale (1994–2009).
- KK, 53, Indian playback singer (Hum Dil De Chuke Sanam, Humraaz, Om Shanti Om), cardiac arrest.
- Ingram Marshall, 80, American composer.
- Jacques N'Guea, 66, Cameroonian footballer (Canon Yaoundé, national team).
- Jim Parks, 90, English cricketer (Sussex, Somerset, national team), complications from a fall.
- Kelly Joe Phelps, 62, American blues musician.
- Vasile Rădulescu, 77, Romanian politician, deputy (1990–1992).
- Zaire Rezende, 90, Brazilian politician, deputy (1991–2000), complications from COVID-19.
- Gilberto Rodríguez Orejuela, 83, Colombian drug lord (Cali Cartel).
- Joe Segal, 97, Canadian philanthropist.
- Bhim Singh, 80, Indian politician, founder of Jammu and Kashmir National Panthers Party, MP (1988) and Jammu and Kashmir MLA (1977–1987).
- Dave Smith, 72, American sound engineer, founder of Sequential.
- Lawrence Zalcman, 78, American mathematician.
- Wang Zherong, 86, Chinese tank designer, member of the Chinese Academy of Engineering.
