= Klaus-Michael =

Klaus-Michael is a masculine given name, combining Klaus and Michael. Notable people with the name include:

- Klaus-Michael Bogdal, professor of German literature at Bielefeld University
- Klaus-Michael Körner (1952–2022), German politician
- Klaus-Michael Kühne (1937–2026), German billionaire and businessman
- Klaus-Michael Mallmann, German historian
