= Parkhomenko =

Parkhomenko (Ukrainian: Пархоменко) or Parkhomenka (Belarusian: Пархоменка) is a Ukrainian and Belarusian surname. It may refer to:

- Adam Parkhomenko (born 1985), American political strategist
- Alexander Parkhomenko (1886–1921), Ukrainian revolutionary
- Aleksandr Parkhomenko (unknown birth year), Russian producer and DJ, half of Matisse & Sadko
- Aliaksandr Parkhomenka (born 1981), Belarusian decathlete
- Andriy Parkhomenko (born 1971), Ukrainian football coach
- Feofan Parkhomenko (1893–1962), Soviet general
- Ihor Parkhomenko (born 1972), Ukrainian archer
- Kostyantyn Parkhomenko (born 1991), Ukrainian football player
- Natalia Parhomenko (born 1979), Ukrainian handballer
- Oksana Parkhomenko (born 1984), Azerbaijani volleyball player
- Sergey Parkhomenko (disambiguation), multiple individuals
- Serhii Parkhomenko (1997–2022), Ukrainian military serviceman
- Svetlana Parkhomenko (born 1962), Russian tennis player
- Tereshko Parkhomenko (1872–1910), Ukrainian kobzar
- Volodymyr Parkhomenko (born 1957), Ukrainian football coach
- Yegor Parkhomenko (born 2002), Belarusian footballer
- Yelena Parkhomenko (born 1982), Azerbaijani volleyball player
- Yury Parkhomenko (unknown birth year), Russian producer and DJ, half of Matisse & Sadko
