= Gross anatomy =

Study of anatomy at the macroscopic level

Gross anatomy is the study of anatomy at the visible or macroscopic level. It is the counterpart to histology, which studies microscopic anatomy. Gross anatomy of the human body or other animals seeks to understand the relationship between components of an organism in order to gain a greater appreciation of the roles of those components and their relationships in maintaining the functions of life. The study of gross anatomy can be performed on deceased organisms using dissection or on living organisms using medical imaging. Education in the gross anatomy of humans includes training for most health professionals.

== Techniques of study ==
Gross anatomy is studied using both invasive and noninvasive methods with the goal of obtaining information about the macroscopic structure and organisation of organs and organ systems. Among the most common methods of study is dissection, in which the corpse of an animal or a human cadaver is surgically opened and its organs studied. Endoscopy, in which a video camera-equipped instrument is inserted through a small incision in the subject, may be used to explore the internal organs and other structures of living animals. The anatomy of the circulatory system in a living animal may be studied noninvasively via angiography, a technique in which blood vessels are visualised after being injected with an opaque dye. Other means of study include radiological techniques of imaging, such as X-ray and MRI.

== In medical and healthcare professional education ==
Most health profession schools, such as medical, physician assistant, and dental schools, require that students complete a practical (dissection) course in gross human anatomy. Such courses aim to educate students in advanced fundamental human anatomy and seek to establish anatomical landmarks used to aid medical diagnosis. Most schools provide students with cadavers for investigation by dissection, aided by dissection manuals, as well as cadaveric atlases (e.g. Netter's, Rohen's).

Working intimately with a cadaver during a gross anatomy course has been shown to capture the essence of the patient-provider relationship. However, the expense of maintaining cadaveric dissection facilities has limited the time and resources available for gross anatomy teaching in medical schools that are less funded, with some adopting alternative prosection-based or simulated teaching. This, coupled with decreasing time dedicated to gross anatomical courses within the growing greater medical school curriculum, has caused controversy surrounding the sufficiency of anatomical teaching with nearly half of newly qualified doctors believing they received insufficient anatomy teaching due to the course often being condensed into one semester.

Medical schools have implemented on-screen anatomical lessons and tutorials to teach students surgical procedures. The use of technological visual aids accompanied with gross dissection have been shown to be more effective than learning via one modality alone. Online and physically made flashcards and quizzes have been long used.

== See also ==
- Anatomy
- Histology
- Human anatomy
