= Rodrigo Lozano de la Fuente =

Spanish doctor and politician (1920–2022)

Member of the Senate of Spain
- In office 15 July 1977 – 2 January 1979
- Constituency: Cuenca

Mayor of Cuenca
- In office 1961–1966

Personal details
- Born: 16 October 1920 Huerta de la Obispalía, Spain
- Died: 22 May 2022 (aged 101) Cuenca, Spain
- Party: UCD
- Education: Complutense University of Madrid
- Occupation: Doctor

Rodrigo Lozano de la Fuente (16 October 1920 – 22 May 2022) was a Spanish politician. He was Cuenca's mayor from 1961 to 1966 and as a member and senator of the Union of the Democratic Centre from 1971 to 1974, he served in the Senate of Spain from 1977 to 1979.

== Life ==
He was born on 16 October 1920 in Huerta de la Obispalía, Spain, to farmer and rancher Rodrigo Lozano Contreras and wife María de la Fuente Patiño. He studied medicine at the Complutense University of Madrid, specializing in Gynecology, and was the head of the Obstetrics and Gynecology service and Director of the Hospital Virgen de la Luz. In 1960, he became Provincial Councilor of the Movement and served as Cuenca's mayor from 1961 to 1966, President of the Cuenca Provincial Council from 1971 to 1974, and a court attorney from 1961 to 1977. He was the founder of the Union of the Democratic Center in Cuenca and senator in the General Courts for Cuenca from 1977 to 1979. He died in Cuenca on 22 May 2022, at the age of 101.
