= Roberto Chapula de la Mora =

Mexican politician (1955–2022)

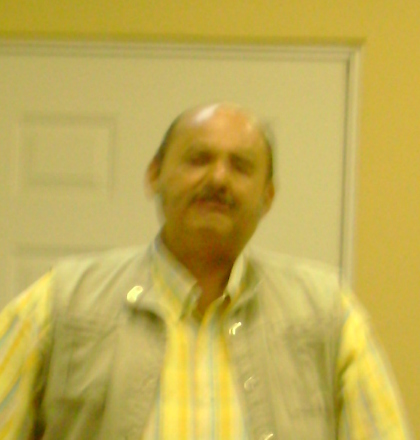
- Chapula in 2008

Member of the Congress of Colima
- In office 1 October 2021 – 2 May 2022
- In office 1 October 2006 – 30 September 2009
- Preceded by: Mario Anguiano Moreno
- Succeeded by: Federico Rangel Lozano
- Constituency: Local District III
- In office 1 October 2000 – 30 September 2003
- Preceded by: Eloísa Chavarrías Barajas
- Succeeded by: José Antonio Orozco Sandoval

Personal details
- Born: 6 November 1955 Colima City, Mexico
- Died: 2 May 2022 (aged 66) Colima City, Mexico
- Party: PVEM

Roberto Chapula de la Mora (6 November 1955 – 2 May 2022) was a Mexican politician. A member of the Ecologist Green Party of Mexico, he served in the Congress of Colima from 2000 to 2003, 2006 to 2009, and 2021 to 2022. He was assassinated in Colima City on 2 May 2022, at the age of 66.
