= Antonio Oviedo =

Spanish footballer and manager (1938–2022)

Personal information
- Full name: Antonio Oviedo Saldaña
- Date of birth: 22 October 1938
- Place of birth: Valencia de Alcántara, Spain
- Date of death: 17 May 2022 (aged 83)
- Height: 1.69 m (5 ft 7 in)
- Position: Forward

Youth career
- Zamora

Senior career*
Years	Team	Apps	(Gls)
- Zamora
1956–1957	Atlético Madrid	0	(0)
1957	Córdoba	9	(11)
1957–1958	Rayo Vallecano	18	(8)
1958–1959	Sevilla	7	(0)
1959–1963	Mallorca	94	(14)
1963–1966	Elche	64	(8)
1966–1967	Granada	0	(0)
1967–1968	Levante	12	(3)
Total		204	(44)

Managerial career
- Margaritense
- 1972–1973: Atlético Baleares
- 1974–1975: Atlético Baleares
- 1976–1978: Atlético Baleares
- 1978–1979: Poblense
- 1979–1981: Mallorca
- 1983–1985: Poblense
- 1985–1986: Atlético Baleares
- 1986–1987: Poli Almería
- 1987–1988: Cacereño
- 1991–1992: Almería
- 1993–1994: Mármol Macael
- * Club domestic league appearances and goals

Antonio Oviedo Saldaña (22 October 1938 – 17 May 2022) was a Spanish footballer who played as a forward, and a manager.

== Club career ==
Born in Valencia de Alcántara, Cáceres, Extremadura, Oviedo joined Atlético Madrid at the age of just 18, from Zamora CF. In February 1957, after making no appearances for the club, he signed for Córdoba CF in Segunda División.

Oviedo made his professional debut on 24 February 1957, starting and scoring the third in a 5–0 routing of Cádiz CF. On 9 June, he scored four goals in a 9–1 thrashing of Algeciras CF.

In January 1958, after a short stint at Rayo Vallecano, Oviedo moved to La Liga with Sevilla FC. He made his debut in the competition on 9 February, in a 5–2 away loss against Athletic Bilbao.

In the 1959 summer, after being rarely used, Oviedo joined RCD Mallorca. He contributed with six goals during his first season, as the Bermellones achieved promotion to the top tier.

In 1963, after suffering relegation, Oviedo signed for Elche CF also in the main category. He left the club in 1966, and after subsequent spells at Granada CF and Levante UD he retired in 1968, aged only 29, due to a knee injury.

== Managerial career ==
Oviedo started up coaching with lowly CD Margaritense. After spells at UD Poblense and CD Atlético Baleares, he was appointed RCD Mallorca manager in 1979; with the side in Tercera División, he achieved two consecutive promotions and took the club back to the second level after a six-year absence.

After being dismissed in December 1981, Oviedo returned to his previous clubs Poblense and Atlético Baleares. In August 1986 he was named CP Almería manager, being also in charge of its successor in 1991.

In the 1993 summer Oviedo was appointed at the helm of newly promoted Mármol Macael CD, but was sacked in January of the following year.
