= Zaire Rezende =

Brazilian politician (1931–2022)

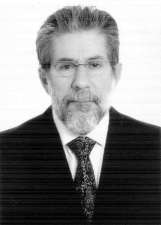

Member of the Chamber of Deputies
- In office 1 February 1991 – 1 February 2000

Personal details
- Born: Uberlândia, Brazil

Zaire Rezende (25 December 1931 – 31 May 2022) was a Brazilian politician.

From 1991 until 2000, he served as a member of the Chamber of Deputies for the Brazilian Democratic Movement.

Rezende died of respiratory complications from COVID-19 at the age of 90 in Uberlândia.
