= Tony Zarb =

Maltese trade unionist (1954–2022)

Tony Zarb (29 January 1954 – 29 May 2022) was a Maltese trade unionist who served as the long-term secretary-general of the General Workers' Union (GWU) in Malta for 16 years from January 1998 to 2015.

== Work ==
Born in Malta, Tony Zarb, MOM worked as cutting operator at the Blue Bell jeans factory in the 1980s in Malta, when he joined the General Workers' Union (GWU) 1981. He rose through the ranks and later took over the union's port & transport section. In October 1998 he was appointed secretary-general and took the office in January 1999. He would hold this post for 16 years until October 2015, when he resigned from his office. During his tenure, he oversaw the Issa Daqshekk campaign, a mass protest against the government which aimed to force it to reduce its plans to increase taxes. One of his main goals was to improve the general working conditions, including foreign workers who were paid little and worked in poor conditions. He opposed the privatisation of the Maltese ports and the liquidation of Malta's national shipping company Sea Malta. He also opposed the entry of Malta into the European Union, which led to considerable criticism against the union, especially from left-wing circles.

For his accomplishments he received the Ġieħ ir-Repubblika, which is the country's highest honour bestowed by the government of Malta. However, almost three years later, the Nationalist Party tabled a motion in parliament to revoke Tony Zarb Gieh ir-Repubblika award. The motion accused Zarb of making statements amounting to apologist remarks with regards to Daphne Caruana Galizia's murder. It also argued that Zarb's remarks (which were captured on video) makes one think that had he been able to stop the murder from happening, he would not have acted, whilst at the same time justifying what the three alleged murderers did.

After his resignation, he entered government service as part-time consultant for the Maltese Office of the Prime Minister (OPM).

He died on 29 May 2022.
