= Vytautas Beleska =

Lithuanian-American musician (1952–2022)

Vytautas Beleska (June 5, 1952 – May 2, 2022), better known as Vyto B, was a Lithuanian-American musician from Chicago, Illinois.

Beleska started playing music at an early age, having studied under Vladas Jakubėnas. Over the course of his life, he played music in multiple countries, including the US, France and Lithuania. He was passionate about his Lithuanian heritage, and worked for the Žilevičius-Kreivėnas Lithuanian musicology archive.

Beleska first started recording in 1964, when he was 12 years old. He formed his own label, Clay Pigeon, to publish the work of himself and other Lithuanian artists in the compilation album First Chips. In the 1970s, he released the album Tricentennial 2076, which later gained a cult reputation as a work of forward thinking outsider music.

He fell sick in 2016. His final work was the album Gridlock, a collaboration with Edward Anderson and his band Mazes. He died in Chicago on May 2, 2022.
