= David Vardanyan =

Armenian politician (1950–2022)

Member of the National Assembly of Armenia
- In office 1995–1999

Member of the Supreme Council of Armenia
- In office 1990–1995

Personal details
- Born: David Manuki Vardanyan; 12 February 1950 Yerevan, Armenian SSR, Soviet Union
- Died: 27 May 2022 (aged 72)
- Party: AZhM
- Education: Yerevan State University

David Manuki Vardanyan (Armenian: Դավիթ Մանուկի Վարդանյան; 12 February 1950 – 27 May 2022) was an Armenian politician. A member of the National Democratic Union, he was a member of the Supreme Council of Armenia from 1990 to 1995 and of the National Assembly of Armenia from 1995 to 1999.

Vardanyan died on 27 May 2022, at the age of 72.
