= Sid Mittra =

American economist (1930–2022)

Dr. Sid Mittra
- Born: May 13, 1930; Benaras, India
- Died: May 11, 2022 (aged 91); Rochester, Michigan, U.S.
- Occupation: Emeritus professor at Oakland University
- Education: PhD in Economics from University of Florida
- Spouse: Bani Mittra

Website
- tobeeornottobee.org

Sid Mittra (May 13, 1930 – May 11, 2022) was an Indian-American economist and academic that was an emeritus professor of finance at Oakland University in Rochester, Michigan and the founder of financial consulting firm Mittra and Associates.

Mittra was also a board member of the International Board of Standards and Practices of Certified Financial Planners. He was also a presenter at World Conference of the International Association for Financial Planning in 2017. He is the author of a textbook on financial planning titled Practicing Financial Planning

== Early life ==
Sid Mittra was born in the small town of Benaras on May 13, 1930. After completing his undergraduate degree from St. Johns College, he enrolled in a masters program at Dayanand Anglo Vedic College (or D.A.V. College). After the completion of his masters program he moved to Bombay as a research assistant in the Reserve Bank of India. He was awarded a Fulbright Grant and went to University of Florida to pursue his PhD in economics.

== Professional life ==
After completing his PhD, Mittra taught at the University of Detroit. After working for the United Nations for an assignment, Mittra became an associate professor at Oakland University in Rochester, Michigan, before changing his research orientation from economics to finance. Mittra subsequently joined the Board of Certified Financial Planners and published a textbook on personal finance entitled, Practicing Financial Planning: A Complete Guide for Professionals, parts of which won a gold in Axiom Business Book Award in 2008. His other publications include Investment Analysis and Portfolio Management, Inside Wall Street, Money and Banking: Theory, Analysis and Policy, and Dimensions in Macroeconomics: A Book of Readings.

Mittra founded a boutique financial planning business called Coordinated Financial Planning, later renamed Mittra & Associates. He also became a member of the International CFP Board.

== Later life and death ==
In his retirement, Mittra wrote an autobiography titled To Bee or Not To Bee.

Mittra died in Rochester, Michigan on May 11, 2022, at the age of 91.
