= Gordon Proudfoot =

Australian rules footballer (1930–2022)

Personal information
- Full name: Gordon Leslie Proudfoot
- Born: 19 November 1930
- Died: 27 May 2022 (aged 91)
- Original team: Frankston
- Height: 180 cm (5 ft 11 in)
- Weight: 76 kg (168 lb)

Playing career^{1}
Years	Club	Games (Goals)
1954–55	Fitzroy	5 (0)
- ^{1} Playing statistics correct to the end of 1955.

Gordon Leslie Proudfoot (19 November 1930 – 27 May 2022) was an Australian rules footballer who played with Fitzroy in the Victorian Football League (VFL).
