= Paolo Dalle Fratte =

Italian politician (1951–2022)

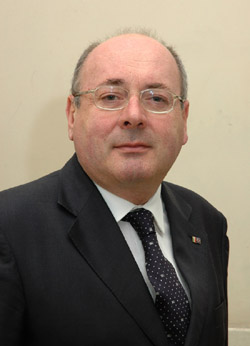

Member of the Chamber of Deputies of Italy
- In office 27 april 2005 – 27 April 2006
- Constituency: Veneto 2

Personal details
- Born: 9 July 1951 Santa Maria di Sala, Italy
- Died: 9 May 2022 (aged 70) Santa Maria di Sala, Italy
- Party: FI

Paolo Dalle Fratte (9 July 1951 – 9 May 2022) was an Italian politician. A member of Forza Italia, he served in the Chamber of Deputies from 2001 to 2006. He died in Santa Maria di Sala on 9 May 2022 at the age of 70.
