= Yuri Javadyan =

Armenian politician (1935–2022)

Minister of Agriculture
- In office February 1991 – December 1991
- Preceded by: position established
- Succeeded by: Gagik Shahbazyan

Personal details
- Born: Yuri Levonovich Javadyan; 1 January 1935 Bnunis, Sisian District, Transcaucasian SFSR, Soviet Union
- Died: 20 May 2022 (aged 87)
- Education: Agricultural Institute of the Armenian Soviet Socialist Republic

Yuri Levonovich Javadyan (Armenian: Յուրի Ջավադյան; 1 January 1935 – 20 May 2022) was an Armenian politician. He served as Minister of Agriculture from February to December 1991. He died on 20 May 2022 at the age of 87.
