= Egidio Alagna =

Italian jurist and politician (1935–2022)

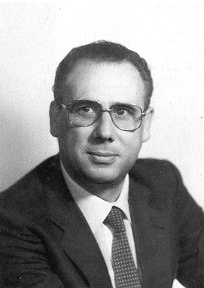
- Alagna in 1983

Member of the Chamber of Deputies of Italy
- In office 12 July 1983 – 22 April 1992
- Constituency: Palermo-Trapani-Agrigento-Caltanissetta constituency

Personal details
- Born: 31 October 1935 Marsala, Italy
- Died: 3 May 2022 (aged 86) Palermo, Italy
- Party: PSI
- Occupation: Judge

Egidio Alagna (31 October 1935 – 3 May 2022) was an Italian politician. A member of the Italian Socialist Party, he served in the Chamber of Deputies from 1983 to 1992. He died in Palermo on 3 May 2022 at the age of 86.
