= Ramses Ohee =

Indonesian pharmacist and politician (1931–2022)

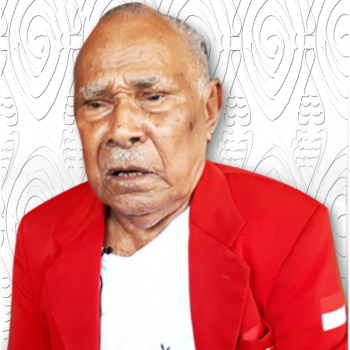

Member of the Papuan People's Representative Council
- In office 16 April 2021 – 30 May 2022
- Governor: Lukas Enembe
- Constituency: Mamta
- In office 13 December 2017 – 31 October 2019
- Governor: Lukas Enembe
- Constituency: Mamta

Member of the Jayapura Regional People's Representative Council
- In office 18 July 1992 – August 1999

Personal details
- Born: 10 October 1931 Asei Besar, Hollandia, Dutch East Indies
- Died: 30 May 2022 (aged 90) Jayapura, Papua, Indonesia

Ramses Ohee (10 October 1931 – 30 May 2022) was a Papuan-Indonesian pharmacist and politician who served as a member of the Jayapura Regional People's Representative Council from 1992 to 1999, and as an appointed member of the Papuan People's Representative Council from 2017 to 2019, and from 2021 until his death. Previously, he worked as an advisor to the government of Netherlands New Guinea and as a pharmacist in the health service of Netherlands New Guinea and the West Irian province.

== Early life and career ==
Ohee was born on 10 October 1931 in Asei Besar, Hollandia (now Jayapura Regency), as the son of Poreu Abner Ohee, the ondoafi (tribal chief) of Asei Besar village, and Pouw Orpa Pallo Yochu. Both of his parents alongside Aitai Baitawi Karubaba were students in Ambon (center of higher learning for eastern regions) which parcitipated in Youth Pledge, facilitated by Sultan of Tidore as delegations of Jong Ambon, which became a cornerstone of the Indonesian national movement.

Ohee attended Sekolah Rakyat (People's School) from 1942 to 1945. He then moved to Yoka, where he pursued further education at Jongen Vervolgschool (boarding school for boys) from 1946 until 1949 and Meer Uitgebreid Lager Onderwijs (junior high school) from 1951 until 1953. Later on he underwent further administration course in Dok V (Hollandia).

Upon graduating from junior high school, on 1 July 1954 Ohee started to work as a clerk in the pharmacy section of the Netherlands New Guinea health service. After several years of working there, Ohee was appointed an advisor to the government in 1959, he also became announcer for Radio Omroep Nieuw Guinea (RONG)'s sports section which was broadcasting local football league of Voetbalbond Hollandia en Omstreken (VHO). Later on he became the head administrator of the malaria eradication program in the pharmacy section on 1 September 1962. After the Netherlands New Guinea was formally annexed by Indonesian as the province of Irian, Ohee continued to work in the health service as a senior bureaucrat in the supplies and pharmacy supervision section according to Irian Governor decree of 31 March 1964, until he decided to retire from the health service on 1 November 1967.

== Political career ==
After his early retirement, Ohee succeeded his father as the ondoafi of Asei Besar village. Ohee was a member of the Djajapura constituency in the PEPERA. Ohee, alongside other electors, voted unanimously in favour of Indonesian control of the region on August 2, 1969. In an interview in 2018, Ohee defended the results of the Act of Free Choice (PEPERA), stating that the election is valid since it has already been confirmed by the United Nations. Ohee stated that those who disputed the results are "illiterates in history" and urged the security forces "embrace and provide understanding with love and compassion" to those who disputed the existence of Papua inside Indonesia.

He underwent many bureaucratic courses for his duty as village leader, such as in Sentani on 5–19 November 1964, in Jakarta 1969 for three months, fisherman course in 1974, fast course for Pamong Desa (village official) 1977 and for Dati II Jayapura in 1988, law counseling for LMA and village leaders in 1989, and village community development in 1990.

Following the Act of Free Choice (PEPERA), Ohee was appointed the Chairman of the Irian Jaya Farmers Association in 1970. He was also elected into the Jayapura Regional People's Representative Council in the 1992 and 1997 elections. As an ondoafi, Ohee since 1970 provided assistance to the local military regiment and the regional military command of Korem 172/PWY and Kodam XVII/ Trikora in maintaining order and security.

The New Order, who had organized the Act of Free Choice (PEPERA), fell from power in 1998 and demands for a greater autonomy for Papua grew bigger. As a leading member of the Papuan tribal council representing LMA Jayapura in 1998 and LMA Port Numbay Kota Jayapura in 1999, Ohee urged the central government to increase the representation for the indigenous Papuans in the Papuan People's Representative Council. Ohee proposed an amendment on the related law to the Constitutional Court of Indonesia in 2010 and was approved by the court. The new representation system, called the special autonomy system, allocated one-fourths of the seats in the council for selection by the provincial government.

Ohee became the chairman of the Red and White Brigade, a pro-Indonesia non-governmental organization in Papua. With his position, Ohee was invited by the government to provide insights about national resilience in Papua in 2008. He participated in the burning of a Free Papua Movement flag in 2016 and awarded Minister of Defense Ryamizard Ryacudu a customary title as a sign of unity.

Ohee registered himself as a candidate for the Papuan People's Representative Council through the special autonomy system, representing the Mamta traditional region. Ohee was selected by the government as an appointed member of the council and was officially installed on 13 December 2017. He ended his first term in 2019 and was selected for a second term in 2021. According to Governor of Papua Lukas Enembe, Ohee was the only non-politically affiliated member of parliament.

In February 2022, Ohee was brought to the Marthen Indey Hospital after he fell sick. The local military regional command provided assistance for his treatment in the hospital. Ohee was transferred to the Dian Harapan Waena Hospital in Jayapura, where he died in the afternoon on 30 May 2022.
