= Sergei Loginov =

Russian footballer (1963–2022)

Personal information
- Full name: Sergei Igorevich Loginov
- Date of birth: 4 September 1963
- Date of death: 23 May 2022 (aged 58)
- Height: 1.80 m (5 ft 11 in)
- Positions: Defender; midfielder

Senior career*
Years	Team	Apps	(Gls)
1982–1984	Zenit Leningrad	0	(0)
1985–1988	Dynamo Leningrad	109	(14)
1989	Dynamo Bryansk	23	(5)
1990–1992	Tekstilshchik Kamyshin	85	(9)
1992	Tekstilshchik-d Kamyshin	1	(0)
1993–1994	Zenit Saint Petersburg	55	(4)
1995–1998	Saturn Ramenskoye	107	(3)
1999	Spartak-Orekhovo	15	(2)
1999–2001	Dinaburg FC	27	(2)
Total		422	(39)
- * Club domestic league appearances and goals

Sergei Igorevich Loginov (Russian: Сергей Игоревич Логинов; 4 September 1963 – 23 May 2022) was a Russian professional footballer who played as a defender or midfielder.

== Honours ==
Dinaburg

- Latvian Football Cup finalist: 2001
