= Yu Zhigang (politician) =

Chinese politician (1973–2022)

Member of the Standing Committee of the National People's Congress
- In office 5 March 2018 – 22 January 2021

Personal details
- Born: May 1973 Luoyang, China
- Died: 3 May 2022 (aged 48) Shenyang, China
- Party: CCP
- Education: Renmin University of China Law School

Yu Zhigang (Chinese: 于志刚; May 1973 – 3 May 2022) was a Chinese politician. A member of the Chinese Communist Party, he served on the Standing Committee of the National People's Congress from 2018 to 2021. He died of a cerebral hemorrhage in Shenyang on 3 May 2022 at the age of 48.
