= Vasile Rădulescu =

Romanian politician (1945–2022)

Vasile Rădulescu (2 January 1945 – 31 May 2022) was a Romanian politician who served as a Deputy.
