= Hidenori Hasegawa =

Japanese politician (1938–2022)

Member of the Tokyo Metropolitan Assembly
- In office July 1989 – July 1993
- Constituency: Suginami

Personal details
- Born: March 6, 1938 Nagano Prefecture, Japan
- Died: May 8, 2022 (aged 84)
- Party: Independent
- Education: Waseda University

Hidenori Hasegawa (Japanese: 長谷川英憲 Hasegawa Hidenori; March 6, 1938 – May 8, 2022) was a Japanese politician. An independent, he served in the Tokyo Metropolitan Assembly from 1989 to 1993. He died on 8 May 2022 at the age of 84.
