= Wade Barber =

American lawyer

Wade Barber (February 11, 1944 – May 13, 2022) was a lawyer, retired judge, and former prosecutor currently practicing law in Pittsboro, North Carolina. Judge Barber served as Senior Resident Superior Court Judge for North Carolina Judicial District 15B from 1998-2006. He returned to private practice in June 2007, and his daughter, Elizabeth Barber, joined the practice in March 2010.

== Education ==
Judge Barber graduated from Pittsboro High School in 1962. He received a B.A. in Economics from Davidson College in 1967 and received a J.D. from the University of North Carolina at Chapel Hill in 1970, where he served as president of his class and vice president of the Student Bar Association.

Over the course of his career, Judge Barber has expanded his legal education by attending numerous conferences and seminars, including intensive programs with the National College of District Attorneys, Cornell University, Duke University School of Law, the University of North Carolina School of Business, the Arizona Supreme Court, and the National Judicial College.

== Career ==
Judge Barber began his career with the Mecklenburg Legal Aid Society. In 1971 he joined the general practice law firm Barber, Holmes, and Barber in Pittsboro. In 1977, Judge Barber left private practice to serve as the District Attorney of Orange and Chatham counties, a position he held until 1984. While District Attorney, Judge Barber was active in the North Carolina District Attorneys Association, serving as President of that body from 1981-1982. As District Attorney, he was particularly helpful in organizing support from the legal community ( for the establishment of the Dispute Settlement Center of Orange County, the first community-based mediation program in North Carolina. He resigned public office in 1985 to practice law and founded the firm Barber, Bradshaw & Vernon in Pittsboro. In 1998, he began his tenure as Senior Resident Superior Court Judge for District 15B, serving Chatham and Orange Counties.

Judge Barber retired from the bench in 2006 and returned to private practice the following year in Pittsboro. In 2010, his daughter, Elizabeth, joined the practice.

== Public service ==
Judge Barber has been dedicated to community leadership and public service throughout his career, and he has helped lead many organizations around North Carolina. He served on the board of directors of the Golden LEAF Foundation and the North Carolina Environmental Defense Fund. Judge Barber has long held an interest in environmental issues in North Carolina and he accepted a nomination to join the EDF board in 2006.

In 1984, Judge Barber was named Chairman of the North Carolina Task Force on Dispute Resolution. Under his leadership, that group recommended the establishment of court mediation, court-based arbitration, and community-based dispute settlement center programs that revolutionized dispute resolution in North Carolina. From 1985-1988, Judge Barber served on the board of governors of the North Carolina Bar Association. Also with the Bar Association, Judge Barber served as Co-Chair of the Centennial Committee (1997–1999) and the Judicial Independence Committee (2006–2010), worked on the Quality of Life Task Force (1989–1991), the Nominating Committee (1994–1995) and the Commission on Public Trust and the Legal Profession (1992–1994).

Judge Barber served as Chairman of the North Carolina Criminal Justice Education and Training Standards Commission from 1981-1985. With his direction, the commission initiated a comprehensive study of the activities of law enforcement, which led to the redesign of the basic law enforcement training course and a doubling of the number of hours required for certification.

Twice, from 1981–1984 and again from 1993–1998, Judge Barber served on the North Carolina Courts Commission. During his second term, he served as Chairman of the Committee on the Structure of the Courts. His leadership led to legislation directing the North Carolina Supreme Court to develop a Case Flow Management Plan in 1995. The committee also initiated studies of the jury process.

He has also served on the North Carolina Criminal Code Commission (1979–1981), as President of the District 15B Bar Association (1989–1990), as Councilor (1995–1998) and as a member of the Ethics Committee (1995–1999, 2006–2007) for the North Carolina State Bar, as Chairman of the State Board of Continuing Legal Education (1990–1992), as a Committee Chairman on the Governor’s Task Force on Drunk Driving (1982–1983), on the Commission on Alternatives to Incarceration (1980–1983), on the Chief Justice’s Advisory Committee on Court Personnel (1981), on the North Carolina News Media/Administration of Justice Council (1980–1982), as President of the North Carolina District Attorney’s Association (1981–1982), on the Alumni Association Board of Directors at the University of North Carolina School of Law (1996–2002), and as an Advisor to the North Carolina Commission on the Future of the Courts (1995–1997).

Judge Barber has also held leadership positions in the Chatham County Democratic Party (Chairman, 1975–1977; Precinct Chairman, 1973–1975), the 4th Congressional District Democratic Party (Chairman, 1976–1977), and the Pittsboro Presbyterian Church (Deacon, 1979–1982; Elder, 1982–1984).

From 1968-1976, Judge Barber served in the United States Army Reserve, where he obtained the rank of Lieutenant.

== Awards ==
Judge Barber was one of the first to receive the North Carolina State Bar Distinguished Service Award. This award honors members of the North Carolina State Bar who have demonstrated exemplary service to the legal profession.

Over his career, he has been awarded the Chatham County Smart Start Distinguished Service Award, the North Carolina Civil Liberties Union Award, the North Carolina Mediation Network Service Award, and the North Carolina Bar Association’s Dispute Resolution Section Service Award.

== Personal life ==
Barber and his wife Marina resided in Chapel Hill, North Carolina. He died from amyotrophic lateral sclerosis on May 13, 2022.
