= Wang Zherong =

Chinese tank designer (1935–2022)

- 王哲荣
- Born: 5 October 1935; Gaoyang County, Hebei, China
- Died: 31 May 2022 (aged 86); 301 Hospital, Beijing, China
- Education: Harbin Military Academy of Engineering
- Scientific career
- Fields: Tank
- Workplaces: China North Industries Corporation

Chinese name
- Simplified Chinese: 王哲荣
- Traditional Chinese: 王哲榮
Transcriptions
Standard Mandarin
- Hanyu Pinyin: Wáng Zhéróng

Wang Zherong (Chinese: 王哲荣; 5 October 1935 – 31 May 2022) was a Chinese tank design expert and an academician of the Chinese Academy of Engineering.

== Biography ==
Wang was born in Gaoyang County, Hebei, on 5 October 1935, during the Republic of China.

In 1956, he was accepted to the Harbin Military Academy of Engineering (now National University of Defense Technology), majoring in tank and armoured vehicle. After graduating in August 1962, he was despatched to the Armored Forces Academy of Science and Technology and was promoted to a group leader in the 201st Institute of the China North Industries Corporation. He served as deputy chief designer of the type 99 tank from January 1985 to January 2001. He was hired as a professor at Beijing Institute of Technology and North University of China in 2005.

On 31 May 2022, he died at the 301 Hospital, in Beijing, at the age of 86.

== Honours and awards ==
- 2001 Member of the Chinese Academy of Engineering (CAE)
- 2001 State Science and Technology Progress Award (First Class) for the type 99 tank
- 2002 Science and Technology Progress Award of the Ho Leung Ho Lee Foundation
