= Lahcen Sekkouri =

Moroccan politician (1952–2022)

Minister of Youth and Sports
- In office 8 October 2015 – 21 October 2016

Personal details
- Born: 1952; Ain Cheggag, Morocco
- Died: 3 May 2022 (aged 69–70); Rabat, Morocco
- Political party: Popular Movement
- Education: Mohammed V University

Lahcen Sekkouri (Arabic: لحسن السكوري; 1952 – 3 May 2022) was a Moroccan politician. A member of the Popular Movement, he served as Minister of Youth and Sports from 2015 to 2016. He died in Rabat on 3 May 2022.
