= Joe Segal =

Canadian businessman and philanthropist (1925–2022)

Joe Segal (January 1925 – 31 May 2022) was a Canadian businessman and philanthropist.

Segal was born in Vegreville, Alberta, moving to Edmonton as a child. He left school at an early age, beginning his business career by going door to door painting garages with army surplus paint after his father's death. After serving in the Second World War, he settled in Vancouver, establishing first an army surplus store and then a clothing store which evolved into the Fields department store chain with more than 100 locations across Western Canada. After Fields acquired a majority stake in Zellers department stores in 1976, followed by a reverse takeover, Segal became a major shareholder in the Hudson's Bay Company when the historic department store purchased Zellers. Segal was a regular at the luxury Four Seasons Hotel Vancouver where he had a table for lunch for over 30 years. He was a major real estate investor, and later a developer with Kingswood Capital Corporation.

Well known for his philanthropy, Segal received the Order of British Columbia in 1992 and then the Order of Canada in 1993. He was a board member of Simon Fraser University and served as chancellor from 1993 to 1999. In 2005, SFU's Segal Graduate School of Business at the Vancouver campus was named after him honouring his contributions to the university. The name of the Joseph & Rosalie Segal & Family Health Centre addictions and mental health treatment facility at Vancouver General Hospital honours their donations to the building of the centre.

He was survived by his wife of 74 years, Rosalie, four children, 11 grandchildren and several great-grandchildren.
