= Antonio T. de Nicolás =

American scholar (1930–2022)

Antonio T. de Nicolas (December 21, 1930 – May 3, 2022) was a Spanish-born American scholar, poet and professor of philosophy. He was professor emeritus of philosophy at the State University of New York at Stony Brook.

De Nicolas received his PhD from Fordham University and authored over 27 books, including translations of works by Ignatius de Loyola and Juan Ramón Jiménez.

In 2014, a collection of essays in honor of de Nicolas was published on the initiative of Christopher Key Chapple who edited the collection.

De Nicolas died on May 3, 2022, at the age of 91.

== Selected publications ==
- Meditations through the Rg Veda: Four-Dimensional Man (1976)
- Avatāra: The Humanization of Philosophy through the Bhagavad Gītā (1976)
- Powers of Imagining: Ignatius de Loyola, a Philosophical Hermeneutic of Imagining through the Collected Works of Ignatius de Loyola (1986).
- Remembering the God to Come (1988)
- The Sea Tug Elegies / Of Angels and Women, Mostly (1991)
- Moksha Smith: Agni's Warrior-Sage, An Epic of the Immortal Fire (2001)
