= Neal Salisbury =

American historian

- Born: 1940; Los Angeles
- Died: May 27, 2022 (aged 81–82)
- Occupation: Historian

Neal Salisbury (1940–2022) was an American historian and university professor. He specialized in Native American history.

== Biography ==
Neal Salisbury was born in 1940 in Los Angeles. He was married to Dana Wallach Salisbury and had one daughter.

== Education ==
He completed his bachelor's and master's degree from UCLA. He studied under Gary Nash who convinced him to become a historian.

== Career ==
He served as the Barbara Richmond 1940 Professor Emeritus in the Social Sciences at Smith College from 1973 to 2014.

== Death ==
Salisbury died on May 27, 2022.

== Awards ==
He has been awarded fellowships by the Smithsonian Institution, the Newberry Library, the National Endowment for the Humanities, the Charles Warren Center at Harvard, the National Humanities Center, the American Antiquarian Society, and the American Council of Learned Societies.

He was also named an honorary member of the Colonial Society of Massachusetts and was the Mellon Distinguished Scholar in Residence at the American Antiquarian Society.

== Bibliography ==
His notable books include:

- Sovereignty and the Goodness of God & Autobiography of Benjamin Franklin & Cherokee Removal
- The Enduring Vision: A History of the American People
- A New Order of Things: Property, Power, and the Transformation of the Creek Indians, 1733–1816
- The Plains Sioux and U.S. Colonialism from Lewis and Clark to Wounded Knee
- The Enduring Vision: A History of the American People, Volume I: To 1877
- Manitou and Providence: Indians, Europeans, and the Making of New England, 1500–1643
