= Anne de Leseleuc =

French actress, writer, and historian (1927–2022)

- Born: Anne-Marie Briois; 6 December 1927; Paris, France
- Died: 4 May 2022 (aged 94); Paris, France
- Education: University of Paris; CNSAD
- Occupations: Actress; Writer; Historian

Anne de Leseleuc, née Anne-Marie Briois, (6 December 1927 – 4 May 2022) was a French actress, writer, and historian.

== Biography ==
Anne de Leseleuc performed under multiple names, including Anne Carrère and Sophie Raynal, the latter of which was the pseudonym for her autobiography, Portrait d'une inconnue.

While in secondary school, Briois took part in theatrical productions and took lessons from Maurice Escande. She attended the University of Paris and CNSAD, paid for through her work as an extra at the Comédie-Française. In 1967, she married Alain de Leseleuc, who was the director of the Théâtre de Paris. In 1975, she resumed her studies at Paris-Sorbonne University and earned a Master of Advanced Studies in art history and archeology. She graduated from the École du Louvre in 1979 and completed her doctorate in the history of the Sorbonne in 1983.

In 1983, de Leseleuc published her first novel, Le Douzième Vautour. She subsequently wrote several works on the history of Gaul and ancient Rome. From 1992 to 1997, she published five historical detective novels and participated in the screenwriting of the 2001 film Vercingétorix : La Légende du druide roi, directed by Jacques Dorfmann.

Anne de Leseleuc died in Paris on 4 May 2022 at the age of 94.

== Filmography ==
- L'Oncle de France (1949)
- Ils sont dans les vignes (1952)
- Miracle of Saint Therese (1952)
- My Husband Is Marvelous (1952)
- Royal Affairs in Versailles (1953)
- Le Guérisseur (1953)
- Cadet Rousselle (1954)
- Nana (1955)
- Napoléon (1955)
- Les carottes sont cuites (1956)
- Marie Antoinette Queen of France (1956)
- La Traversée de Paris (1956)
- OSS 117 Is Not Dead (1957)
- Charming Boys (1957)
- Les Tripes au soleil (1958)
- Life Together (1958)
- Touchez pas aux blondes (1960)
- The Vampire of Düsseldorf (1965)
- Ces messieurs de la famille (1968)
- Ces messieurs de la gâchette (1970)
- The Cop (1970)

== Publications ==
=== Novels ===
==== Marcus Aper ====
- Les Vacances de Marcus Aper (1992)
- Marcus Aper chez les Rutènes (1993)
- Marcus Aper et Laureolus (1994)
- Les Calendes de septembre (1995)
- Le Trésor de Boudicca (1997)

==== Historical detective novels ====
- Vercingétorix, ou l'Épopée des rois gaulois (2001)
- Le Secret de Victorina (2001)

==== Other novels ====
- Le Douzième Vautour (1983)
- Éponine (1985)
- Portrait d'une inconnue (2009)

=== Historical books ===
- Le Chien, compagnon des dieux gallo-romains (1983)
- La Gaule : architecture et civilisation (2001)
- Le Clan des Illyriens (2006)
- Commios, roi des Atrébates (2010)
- Tetricus, empereur gaulois (2012)
- Julien le philosophe (2013)
