= Martha Myers =

American dance educator (1925–2022)

Martha Myers (May 23, 1925 – May 24, 2022) was an American dance educator. She was the founder of the dance department at Connecticut College and a former dean of the school of the American Dance Festival.
