= Ann Metzinger =

American nutritionist (1931–2022)

- Ann Oliva Boudreaux (later Metzinger), from the 1951 yearbook of the Southwestern Louisiana Institute
- Born: August 28, 1931; Lafayette, Louisiana
- Died: May 6, 2022 (aged 90); Louisiana
- Occupation(s): Nutritionist, public health researcher, college professor

Ann Oliva Boudreaux Metzinger (August 28, 1931 – May 6, 2022) was an American nutritionist, college professor and public health researcher. She taught at Tulane University School of Public Health and Tropical Medicine for 42 years, beginning in 1967.

== Early life and education ==
Ann Oliva Boudreaux was born on August 28, 1931, in Lafayette, Louisiana, the daughter of Leo Leon Boudreaux and Blanche Martin Boudreaux. Her father worked for the Southern Pacific Railroad, and her mother worked as a saleslady at a department store.

In 1951, Boudreaux earned a bachelor's degree in Institutional Management at the University of Southwestern Louisiana. She also completed an internship in dietetics at Vanderbilt University Hospital in 1952. She earned two master's degrees, an MS from Louisiana State University in 1958, and a second master's in public health and tropical medicine from Tulane University in 1975. In 1980 she completed a doctoral degree at Tulane. Her dissertation was titled "A Comparison of the Nutrient Intake of Black, Caucasian and Vietnamese Elementary School Students Participating in the National School Lunch Program in the New Orleans Public Schools".

== Career ==
Metzinger became a professor at Tulane's School of Public Health in 1967, and taught nutrition there until her retirement with emeritus status in 2009. Continuing her dissertation interest, she focused on research concerning child nutrition. She founded the college's Dietetic Internship program. She worked at the United States Public Health Service Hospital at Carville, and at the Charity Hospital of New Orleans, early in her career, and later in Zaire, Colombia, Algeria, and Haiti consulting on public health and nutrition projects. She was a nutrition fellow of the Louisiana Geriatric Education Center, and in 2012 received the Lifetime Achievement in Global Health Award from Tulane. She was president of the Louisiana Dietetic Association.

== Personal life ==
Ann Boudreaux married Walter Frederick Metzinger Jr. in 1959. They had two children.

She died on May 6, 2022, at the age of 90. Her gravesite is in Metairie Cemetery.
