= Morio Matsui =

Japanese artist (1942–2022)

- 松井 守男
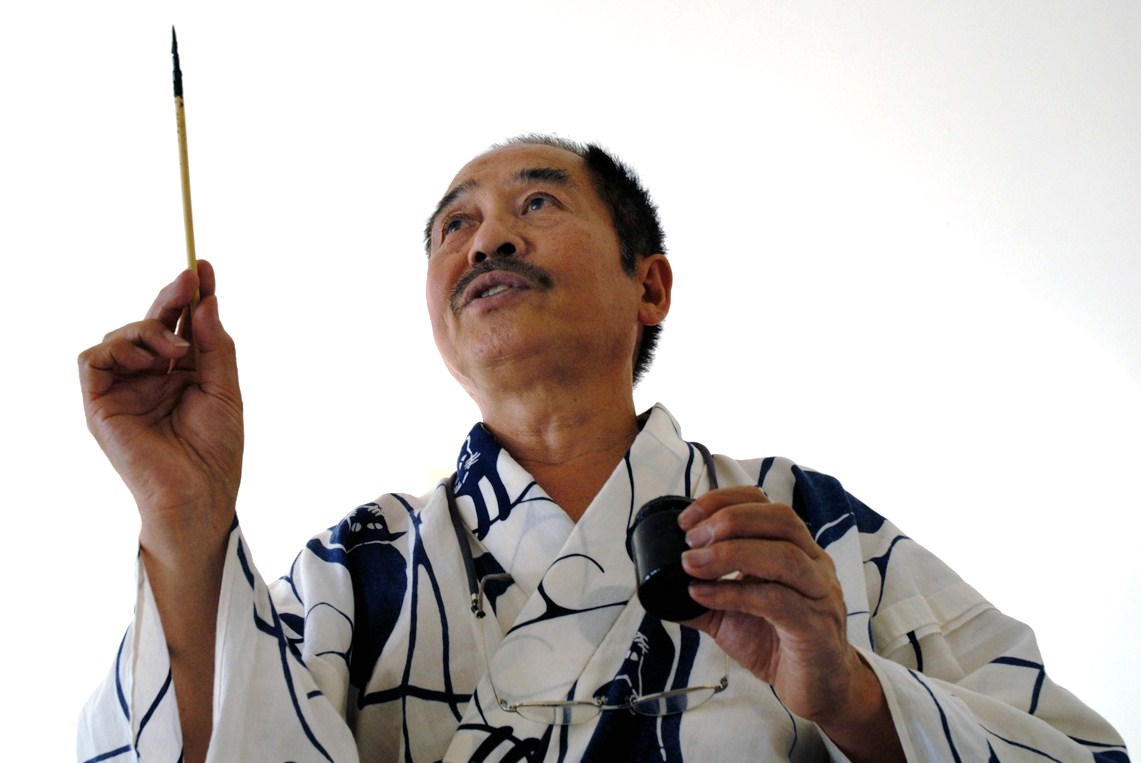
- Matsui in 2007
- Born: 1942; Toyohashi, Aichi, Japan
- Died: 30 May 2022 (aged 79)
- Education: Musashino School of Fine Art, Tokyo
- Occupation: Artist

Morio Matsui (松井 守男, Matsui Morio; 1942 – 30 May 2022) was a Japanese artist who lived and worked in Corsica, France from 1998 until his death.

== Biography ==
Morio Matsui was born in Toyohashi, Aichi, the sixth in a family of seven children. His father was wounded in war, and his mother died when he was 14. He studied at the Musashino College of Fine Art in Tokyo.

In 1967, he moved to Paris, France, on a French government scholarship. He continued his studies at the Académie Julian (Guancé Studio, 1967–1968) and the École des Beaux-Arts in Paris,(Singier Studio, 1967–1972).

Matsui was made Chevalier of the Ordre des Arts et des Lettres in 2000, and was awarded France's Legion of Honour medal in 2003.

== Paintings (selection) ==
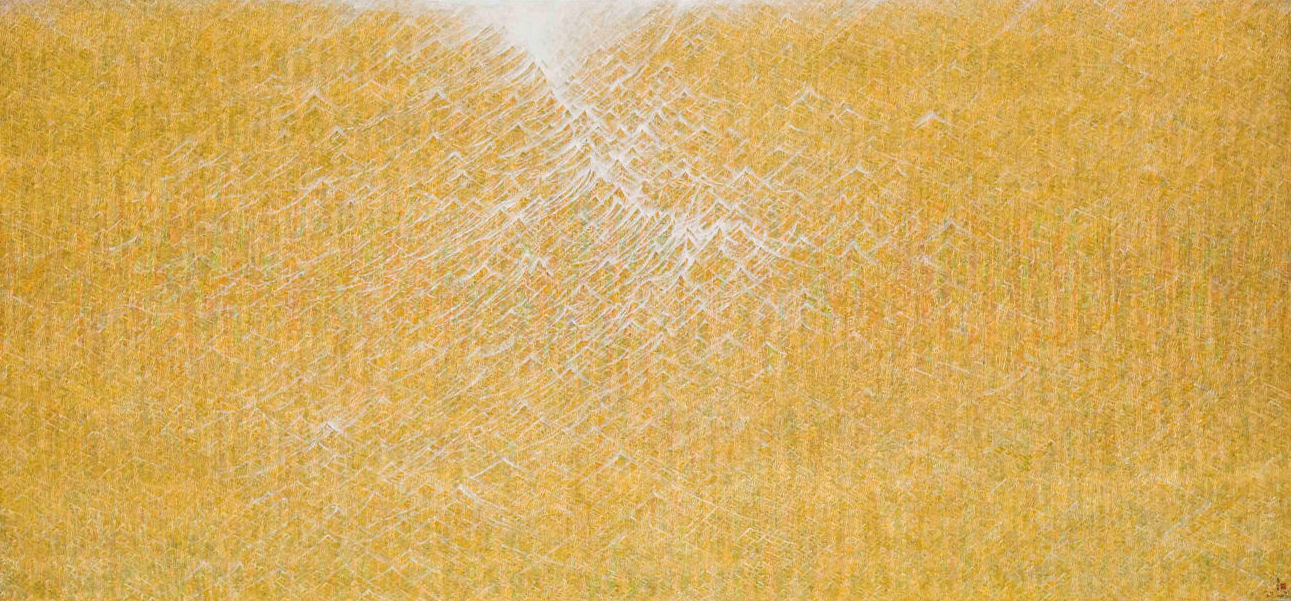
Le Testament

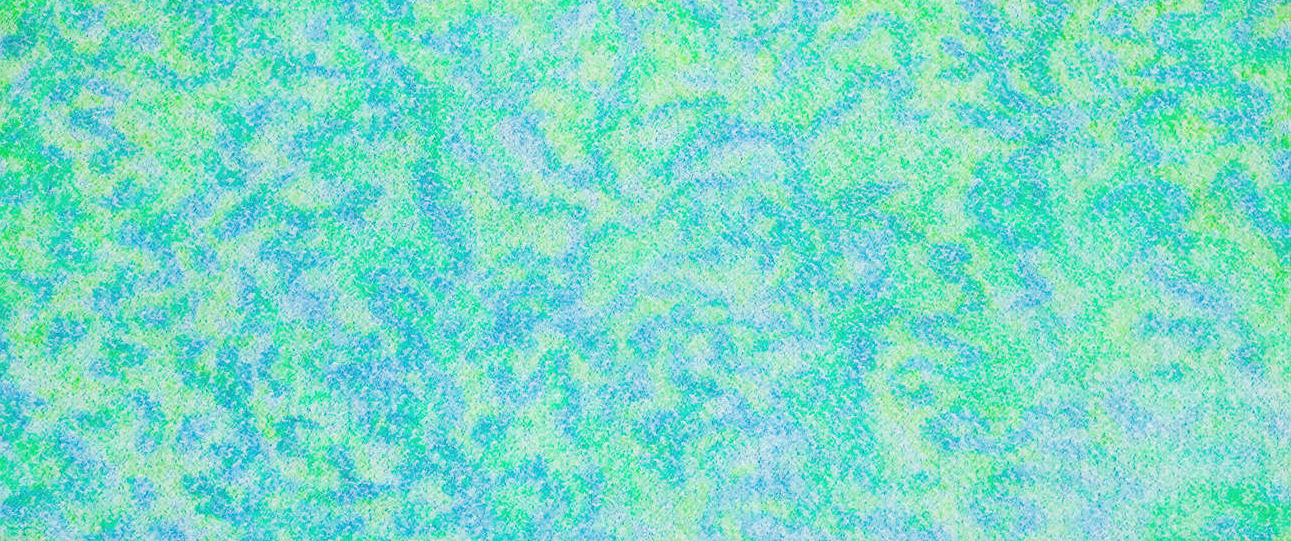
La Nature

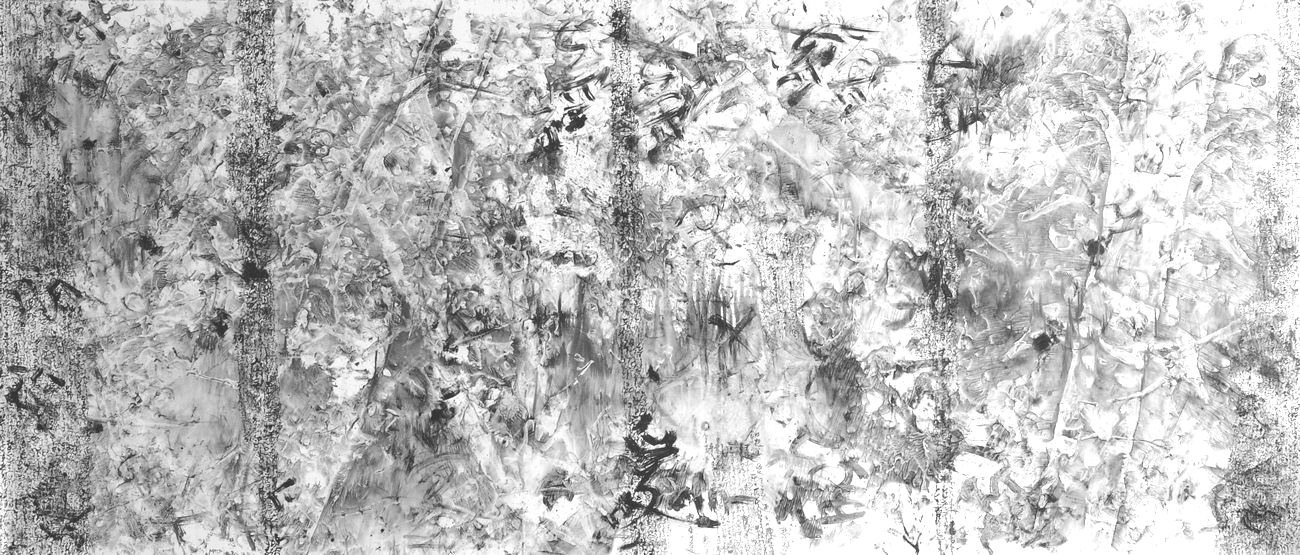
Arbre de Vie

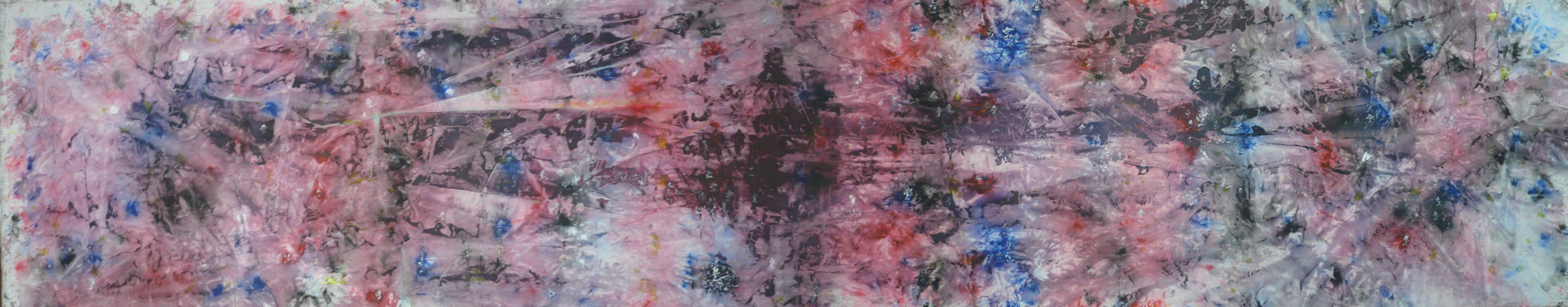
Hope Japan

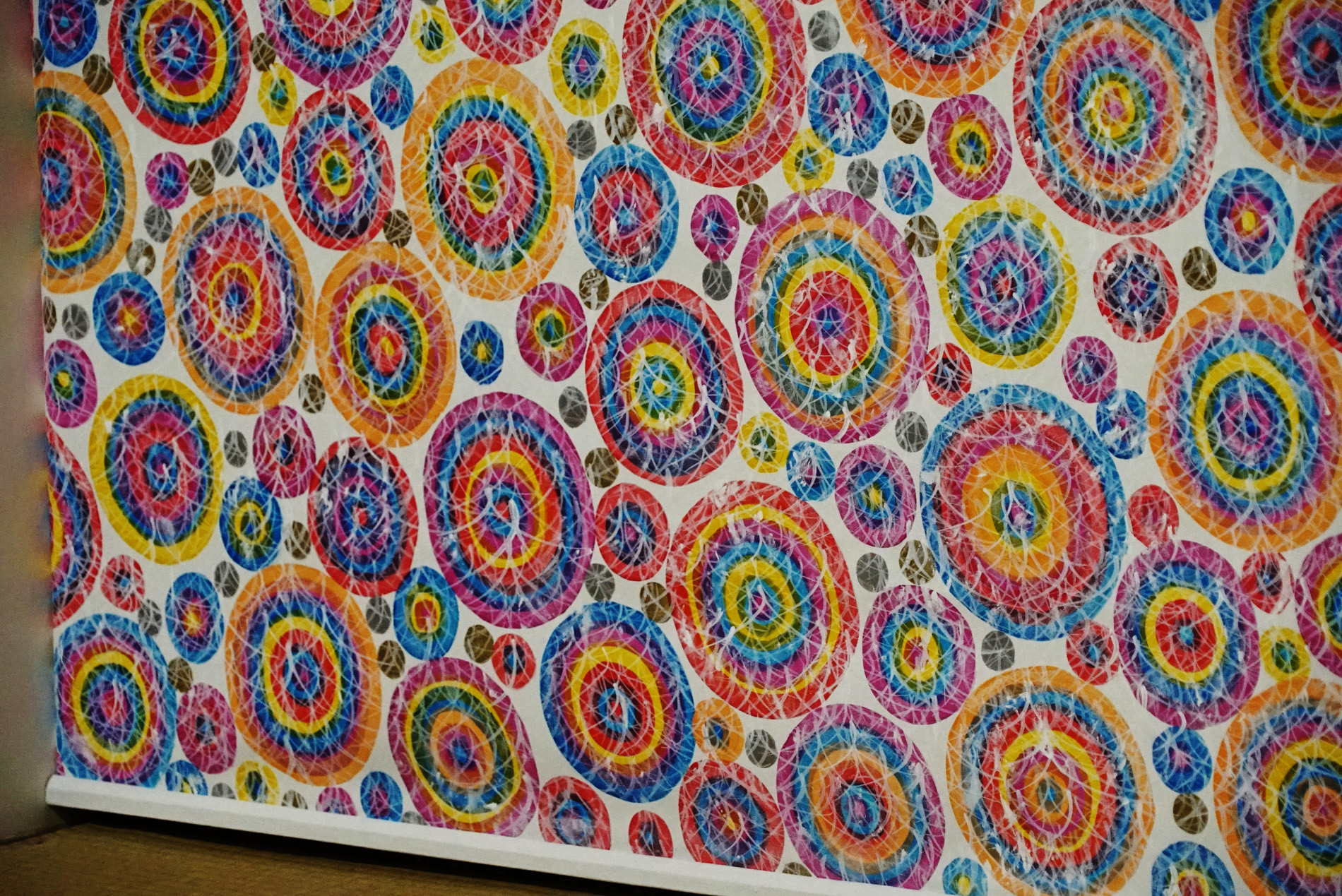
Univers (detail), 2017, oil on canvas, 200 x 200 cm

- Le Testament, oil on canvas, 215 x 470 cm (1985)
- Paysage en noir et blanc, oil on canvas, 200 x 450 cm (1985)
- Kakejiku, oil on canvas, 1000 x 215 cm (1987)
- Triptych: La Crucifixion, La Résurrection, L'Ascension, oil on canvas, (195 x 130 cm) x3 (1998)
- La Nature, oil on canvas, 215 x 500 cm (2004)
- Arbre de Vie, oil on canvas, 215 x 500 cm (2006)
- Soleil levant, oil on canvas, 215 x 500 cm (2007)
- No more Nagasaki, oil on canvas, 215 x 1000 cm (2010)
- Hope Japan, oil on canvas, 215 x 1000 cm (2011-2012)
- Yamato-Damashii (detail), oil on canvas, 215 x 1000 cm (2012)
- Univers, (detail), oil on canvas, 200 x 200 cm (2017)

== Exhibitions ==
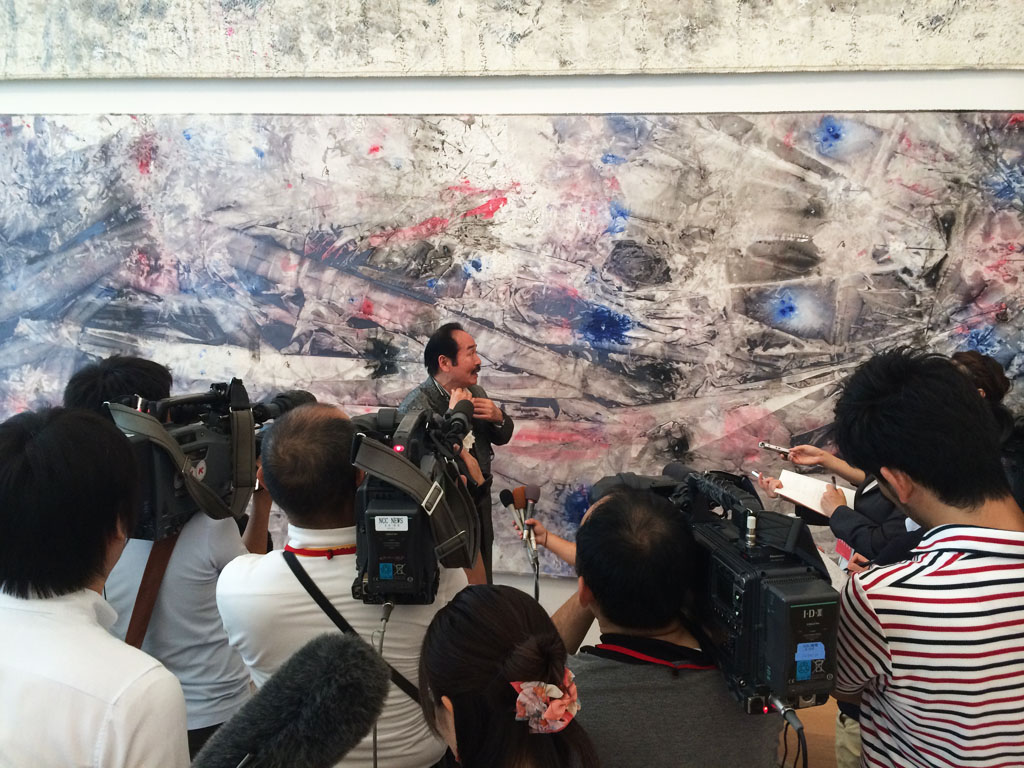
Matsui at the Nagasaki Prefectural Art Museum in 2014

- Galerie de France, Paris Twelve Artists from the Singier studio (1969)
- Eglise de la Madeleine, Paris (1971)
- Salon des Réalités Nouvelles, Paris (1970, 1971, 1974)
- Salon de Mai, Paris (1970, 1971, 1986)
- Bernheim-Jeune Gallery, Paris (1978, 1982, 2007)
- Bibliothèque Nationale, Paris. Contemporary Prints with Pignon, Zao Wou-Ki, Warhol, Picasso (1979)
- Centre Georges Pompidou, Paris. Air France Poster Exhibition with Vasarely, Poliakoff, Mathieu, Hartung, Colin (1981)
- Toyohashi Art Museum, Japan (1986)
- Sogetsu Gallery, Tokyo (1986, 1988, 1990)
- Nichizu Museum of Design, Kyoto (1987)
- Mitsubishi Artium Gallery, Fukuoka, Japan (1989)
- New Chitose Airport Terminal Museum, Sapporo (1992)
- Fesch Museum, Ajaccio. Retrospective (1997)
- La Marge Gallery, Ajaccio (1998)
- Fine Arts Museum, Menton.Masters of Modern Portrait with Giacometti, Warhol, César, Arman, Ben (1999)
- Palais de l'Europe, Menton. Contemporary Nudes Exhibition with Villeglé, Monory, Velikovic, Combas, Di Rosa (2000)
- Ajaccio, Monaco, Paris, Nice, Calvi, Nagasaki. Exhibition of the triptych "La Crucifixion, la Résurrection, l'Ascension" (2000, 2001, 2003, 2004, 2008)
- Saint Paul de Vence Museum (encounter with André Verdet) (2001)
- Galerie de la Marine, Museum of Nice (2002)
- UNESCO, Miro Hall, Paris (2003)
- Expo 2005 in Aichi, French pavilion, Japan (2005)
- Takashimaya, Nihombashi, Tokyo (98 large paintings: 5, 7 and 10 meters) (2005)
- Chanel Nexus Hall, Ginza, Tokyo. 150th anniversary of the diplomatic relations between France and Japan (2008)
- Expo 2008 in Zaragoza, French pavilion, Spain (2008)
- Goto Cultural Center, Nagasaki (2010)
- Toyohashi City Museum of Art & History, Japan Retrospective (2010)
- Nagasaki National Peace Memorial Hall, Nagasaki 65th anniversary (2010)
- 5/R Hall & Gallery, Nagoya (2011)
- Contemporary Arts Festival, Aspretto base, Corsica (2011)
- Nagasaki Prefectural Art Museum (2012)
- Nagasaki Prefectural Art Museum for the 90th anniversary of the Franco-Japanese cultural partnership (1924-2014). 151 paintings plus 17 measuring 10 meters (2014)
- Lourdes Sanctuary(43 paintings in 6 sites). Each year the sanctuary greets 80 000 sick people, 100 000 volunteers and 6 000 000 pilgrims (2015).
- Kyoto Sanctuary. Kamigamo-jinja, Hosein and Sanzen-in Temples where the artist celebrated his 50-year career (2016-2017).
- Tsukiji Honganji Temple, Tokyo (Opening ceremony celebrating the 160th anniversary of diplomatic relations between France and Japan)
- Inaugural Exhibition at the Kanda Myojin shrine in Tokyo (2018)
- Sakuragaoka Museum, Toyokawa (2020)

== Books ==
- 80 works from 1966 to 2000, French-English, 150 pages, DCL editions 2001
- Recent works from 1997 to 2007, French-Japanese, 50 pages, DCL editions 2007
- Matsui Morio - Retrospective, Catalogue of the retrospective at the Toyohashi City Museum of Art & History (Japan) 17 July - 22 August 2010, Japanese-English, 133 pages, Insho-sha editions 2010
- Création de la Lumière in June–July 2014 at Nagasaki Prefectural Art Museum, Japanese, 223 pages, Showado editions, 2014
