= Kevin Corcoran (footballer) =

Australian rules footballer (1931–2022)

Personal information
- Full name: Kevin Corcoran
- Born: 15 August 1931
- Died: 7 May 2022 (aged 90)
- Original team: Kensington
- Height: 175 cm (5 ft 9 in)
- Weight: 68 kg (150 lb)

Playing career^{1}
| Years | Club | Games (Goals) |
| 1952 | North Melbourne | 1 (0) |
- ^{1} Playing statistics correct to the end of 1952.

Kevin Patrick Corcoran (15 August 1931 – 7 May 2022) was an Australian rules footballer who played with North Melbourne in the Victorian Football League (VFL). Corcoran died on 7 May 2022, at the age of 90.
