= David Humke =

American politician

Member of the Nevada Assembly from the 26th district
- In office November 3, 1983 – November 6, 2002
- Preceded by: Paul Prengaman
- Succeeded by: Sharron Angle

Personal details
- Born: October 23, 1948 Waterloo, Iowa
- Died: May 5, 2022 (aged 73) Reno, Nevada
- Party: Republican

David Humke (October 23, 1948 – May 5, 2022) is an American politician who served in the Nevada Assembly from the 26th district from 1983 to 2002.

He died on May 5, 2022, in Reno, Nevada at age 73.
