= Camille Ninel =

French footballer (1928–2022)

Personal information
- Date of birth: 23 March 1928
- Place of birth: Fort-de-France, Martinique, France
- Date of death: 20 May 2022 (aged 94)
- Position: Midfielder

Senior career*
Years	Team	Apps	(Gls)
1950–1951	Metz B		
1951–1961	Lyon	247	(6)
1962–1964	Tarentaise		
1964–1966	Moulins		
1966–1970	Bressuire		

Managerial career
- 1966–1970: Bressuire
- * Club domestic league appearances and goals

Camille Ninel (23 March 1928 – 20 May 2022) was a French professional football player and manager.

== Career ==
Born in Fort-de-France, Martinique, Ninel played as a midfielder for Metz B, Lyon, Tarentaise, Moulins and Bressuire, also managing the latter.
