= Masanori Nishio =

Japanese politician (1949–2022)

- 西尾 正範

Mayor of Hakodate
- In office 27 April 2007 – 26 April 2011
- Preceded by: Hiroshi Inoue
- Succeeded by: Toshiki Kudō

Personal details
- Born: 3 January 1949 Ōno, Hokkaido, Japan
- Died: 28 May 2022 (aged 73) Hakodate, Hokkaido, Japan
- Party: Independent
- Education: Kyoto University

Masanori Nishio (西尾 正範, Nishio Masanori; 3 January 1949 – 28 May 2022) was a Japanese politician.

Nishio was born in Ōno, Hokkaidō, now part of the city of Hokuto. After graduating Kyoto University, he became a public servant in 1973. He was appointed deputy mayor of Hakodate by its then-mayor Hiroshi Inoue (politician) in July 2003, but resigned himself in December 2006 due to a rift with the mayor over the construction of a retirement home. He beat Inoue in the mayoral election held on 22 April 2007, and took office on 27 April.

| Preceded by Hiroshi Inoue | Mayor of Hakodate; 27 April 2007 – 26 April 2011 | Succeeded by Toshiki Kudō |
