= Lily Chodidjah Wahid =

Indonesian politician (1948–2022)

Member of the People's Representative Council
- In office 1 October 2009 – 20 March 2013
- Preceded by: position established
- Succeeded by: Jazilul Fawaid
- Constituency: Jawa Timur II

Personal details
- Born: 4 March 1948 Jombang Regency, Dutch East Indies
- Died: 9 May 2022 (aged 74) Jakarta, Indonesia
- Party: PKB

Lily Chodidjah Wahid (4 March 1948 – 9 May 2022) was an Indonesian politician. A member of the National Awakening Party, she served in the People's Representative Council from 2009 to 2013. She died in Jakarta on 9 May 2022 at the age of 74.
