= Marian van der Meer =

Dutch politician (1936–2022)

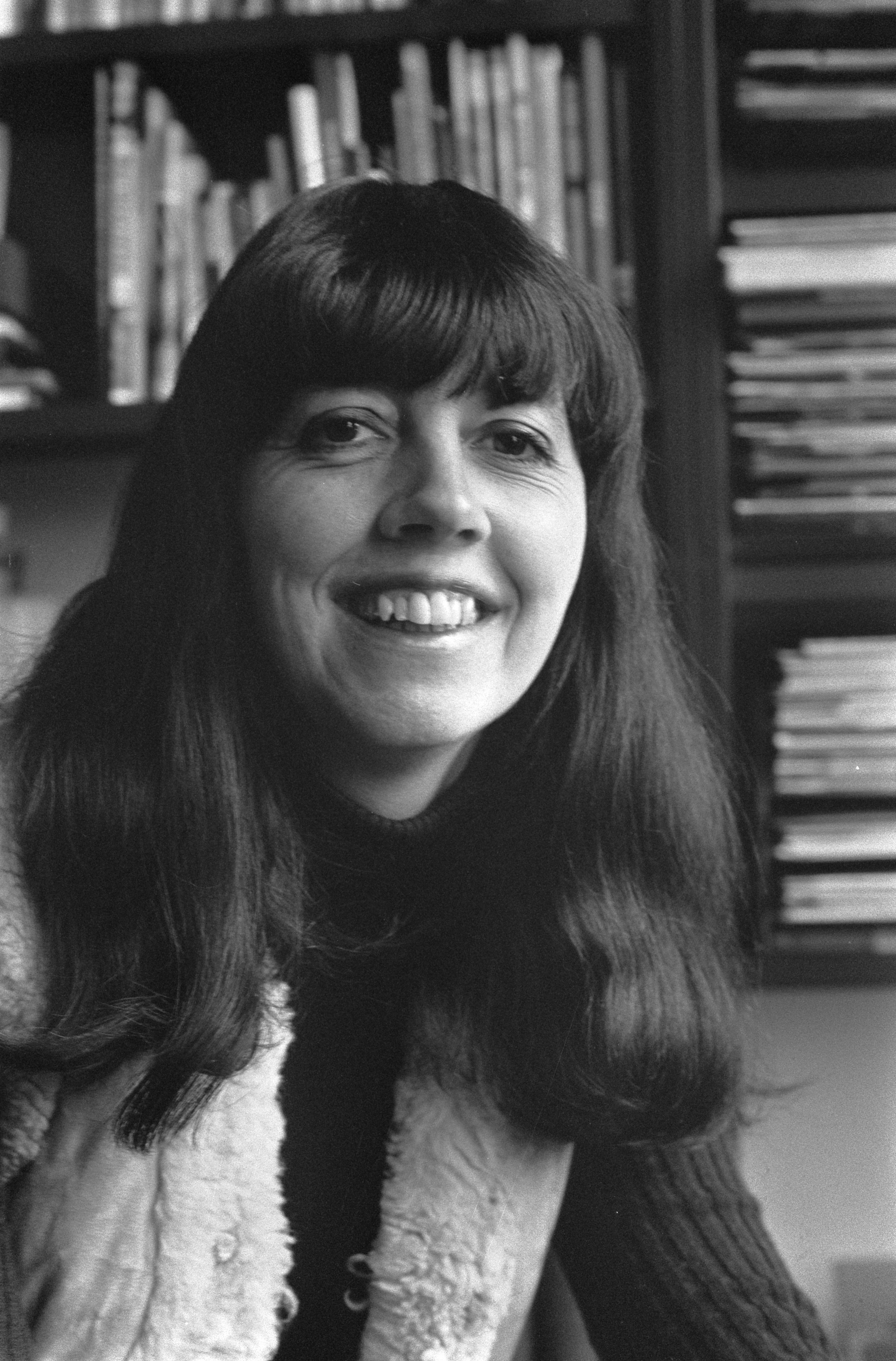
- Van der Meer in 1974

Member of the Senate of the Netherlands
- In office 1983–1995

Member of the Provincial Council of North Holland
- In office 1970–1982

Personal details
- Born: Marie Anne van der Meer; 18 May 1936 Hengelo, Netherlands
- Died: 6 May 2022 (aged 85) Amsterdam, Netherlands
- Party: PvdA

Marie Anne "Marian" van der Meer (18 May 1936 – 6 May 2022) was a Dutch politician. A member of the Labour Party, she served in the Senate from 1983 to 1995. She died in Amsterdam on 6 May 2022 at the age of 85.
