= Freddy Johnston =

Scottish journalist (1935–2022)

Frederick Patrick Mair, better known as Freddy Johnston (September 15, 1935 – May 1, 2022) was a Scottish journalist. He owned and served as the chairman of Johnston Press. He was also known as Mr Freddy.

== Life and career ==
Johnston was born on September 15, 1935, in Edinburgh, as Frederick Patrick Mair to Fred Johnston and Muriel Kathleen. He attended Morrison's Academy, Lancing College and New College, Oxford.

Johnston married Ann in 1961 and they have two children, Michael and Robert, both journalists.

Following graduation, he worked as a journalist for the Liverpool Post and Echo before joining Times Newspaper as an assistant corporate secretary in London.

In 2001, he took retirement.

In 2006, his company acquired The Scotsman.
