= Duberildo Jaque =

Chilean lawyer and politician (1921–2022)

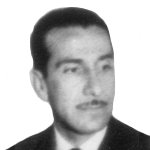

Member of the Chamber of Deputies
- In office 15 May 1961 – 15 May 1973

Personal details
- Born: Duberildo Jaque Araneda; 7 April 1921 Carahue, Chile
- Died: 22 May 2022 (aged 101) Concepción, Chile
- Party: Radical Party of Chile; Chilean Social Democracy Party
- Education: University of Chile
- Occupation: Lawyer

Duberildo Jaque Araneda (7 April 1921 – 22 May 2022) was a Chilean lawyer and politician. A member of the Radical Party and later the Chilean Social Democracy Party, he served in the Chamber of Deputies from 1961 to 1973.

== Life and career ==
Jaque was born on 7 April 1921, to Pedro Jaque and Isidora Araneda in Carahue, Chile. He studied at the Liceo de Temuco and law at the University of Chile and was sworn in with the "Commercial air navigation in Chile" thesis as a lawyer on 2 December 1949. He served as both a professor of Civic Education and Political Economy at the Liceo de Niñas de Concepción and a local police judge in Penco. He was a Public Law Seminar assistant and Administrative Law professor at the School of Law at the University of Concepción.

He was a Ministry of the Interior official from 1945 till 1949. Between 1949 and 1961, he was the Municipality of Concepción's secretary-attorney and occasional deputy mayor.

As a Radical Party of Chile member, he led the Radical Youth of the 8th Commune of the First District of Santiago and was a member of the Radical Assembly of Concepción and the Political Commission of the party in the 23rd National Convention.

In 1961, 1965, and 1969 he was elected deputy for the Seventeenth Departmental Group "Concepción, Tomé, Talcahuano." He was a member of the Permanent Commission of Internal Government, Permanent Commission of Housing and Urbanism and Latin American Integration and National Defense. In 1972 he joined the Radical Party of the Left and in 1973 ran unsuccessfully for reelection.

On 14 March 1983, during the Military dictatorship of Chile he was one of the signatories of the Democratic Manifesto which gave rise to the Democratic Alliance, which brought together Christian Democrats, Socialists, Conservative-Liberals, and Social Democrats to oppose Augusto Pinochet's regime.

Jaque died on 22 May 2022, at the age of 101.
