= Johannes W. Rohen =

German anatomist (1921–2022)

Johannes Wolfgang Rohen (18 September 1921 – 26 May 2022) was a German anatomist.

Born in Münster on 18 September 1921, he was mostly known for his photographic atlas of human anatomy cadaver dissection, Color Atlas of Anatomy - A Photographic Study of the Human Body, one of the most widely used atlases in the field. It has been translated into 18 languages. The 18th translated language is Korean. Rohen died on 26 May 2022, at the age of 100.

== Works ==
- Rohen, Johannes W. (2011) Anatomie des Menschen - Fotografischer Atlas der systematischen und topografischen Anatomie 7th Edition, published by Schattauer, ISBN 978-3-7945-2706-9
