= Klaus-Michael Körner =

German politician (1952–2022)

Member of the Landtag of Mecklenburg-Vorpommern
- In office 1998–2011

Personal details
- Born: 27 November 1952 Cottbus, East Germany
- Died: 16 May 2022 (aged 69)
- Party: SPD
- Education: University of Rostock

Klaus-Michael Körner (27 November 1952 – 16 May 2022) was a German politician. A member of the Social Democratic Party of Germany, he served in the Landtag of Mecklenburg-Vorpommern from 1998 to 2011. He died on 16 May 2022 at the age of 69.
