= Serhii Parkhomenko =

Ukrainian military serviceman (1997–2022)

Serhii Ihorovych Parkhomenko (Ukrainian: Сергій Ігорович Пархоменко; January 14, 1997, Kharkiv – May 14, 2022, Huliaipole, Zaporizhzhia Oblast) was a military serviceman, captain of the Armed Forces of Ukraine, participant in the Russian-Ukrainian war. In August 2022, he was posthumously awarded the title of Hero of Ukraine.

== Biography ==
He was born on January 14, 1997, in the city of Kharkiv, in a family of military aviators. He graduated from the Ivan Bohun Kyiv Military Lyceum.

At the time when his father Ihor Parkhomenko was performing combat missions in the air during the war in Donbas in 2014, Serhiy entered the flight faculty of the Ivan Kozhedub National Technical University, which he successfully graduated in 2019, having obtained the qualification of a 3rd class pilot.

Following the example of his father and grandfather, Serhii expressed a desire to serve in the tactical aviation brigade named after Lieutenant General Vasyl Nikiforov and to fly Sukhoi Su-25 aircraft. Despite his young age, at the time of the 2022 Russian invasion of Ukraine, he already held the position of commander of the aviation unit. According to the Ukrainian Air Force, since the first day of repelling the Russian invasion, he carried out 38 combat sorties, during which he destroyed more than 20 enemy tanks, more than 50 armored combat vehicles, 55 vehicles, 20 fuel tanks and several hundred Russian soldiers and officers.

On May 14, 2022, Captain Serhiy Parkhomenko died while performing a combat mission in Zaporizhzhia Oblast, near the city of Huliaipole.

Since active hostilities were ongoing in the region where Parkhomenko came from, on May 18, 2022, he was buried in Vinnytsia.

He was survived by his parents, wife and son, who was born in March 2022.

== Awards ==
- the title of Hero of Ukraine with the award of the «Golden Star» order (May 20, 2022, posthumously) — for personal courage and heroism, shown in the defense of state sovereignty and territorial integrity of Ukraine, loyalty to the military oath.
- Order of Bohdan Khmelnytskyi III Class (May 2, 2022) — for personal courage and selfless actions shown in the defense of state sovereignty and territorial integrity of Ukraine, loyalty to the military oath.

== Sources ==
- Anastasia Olekhnovich, Two months before his death, Hero of Ukraine Serhiy Parkhomenko became a father… // ArmiyaInform. — 2022. — May 21.
