= Deaths in March 2022 =

The following is a list of notable deaths in March 2022.

Entries for each day are listed alphabetically by surname. A typical entry lists information in the following sequence:

- Name, age, country of citizenship at birth, subsequent country of citizenship (if applicable), reason for notability, cause of death (if known), and reference.

== March 2022 ==
=== 1 ===
- Brahim Boutaleb, 84, Moroccan academic and politician, deputy (1977–1983).
- Yvonne Ciannella, 95, American coloratura soprano.
- Clement Crisp, 95, British dance critic (Financial Times).
- George DeLeone, 73, American football coach (Southern Connecticut Owls), cancer.
- Jim Denomie, 67, American Ojibwe painter, cancer.
- Conrad Janis, 94, American musician and actor (Mork & Mindy, Margie, That Hagen Girl), organ failure.
- Gordon Kannegiesser, 76, Canadian ice hockey player (St. Louis Blues, Houston Aeros, Indianapolis Racers), complications from amyotrophic lateral sclerosis.
- Herbert Kelman, 94, American social psychologist.
- Gareth Knight, 91, British occultist.
- Alevtina Kolchina, 91, Russian cross-country skier, Olympic champion (1964).
- Kendrew Lascelles, 86, English-born South African actor (Candy Stripe Nurses).
- Warner Mack, 86, American country singer-songwriter ("Is It Wrong (For Loving You)", "The Bridge Washed Out").
- Alfred Mayer, 85, Austrian politician.
- Katie Meyer, 22, American soccer player (Stanford Cardinal), NCAA champion (2019), suicide.
- Noni Olabisi, 67, American painter and muralist.
- Hugh O'Shaughnessy, 87, British journalist and writer.
- Richard E. Rumble, 99, American rear admiral.
- Amnon Shamosh, 93, Israeli writer and poet.
- Wang Bei, 90, Chinese actress (Crows and Sparrows, The Life of Wu Xun).
- Bob Wellings, 87, British television presenter and journalist (Nationwide).
- George Wigton, 93, American basketball coach.
- Dale Young, 93, American politician.

=== 2 ===
- Israel Beltrán Montes, 74, Mexican politician, deputy (1991–1994, 2006–2009), complications from COVID-19.
- Johnny Brown, 84, American actor (Good Times, Rowan & Martin's Laugh-In, The Plastic Man Comedy/Adventure Show) and singer.
- Yosef Carmon, 88, Israeli actor (Alila, Sweet Mud) and stage director.
- Robert Cohen, 91, French boxer, world bantamweight champion (1954).
- Olivier Cousi, 62, French lawyer, bâtonnier of the Paris Bar Association (since 2020).
- John S. Crosby, 89, American lieutenant general.
- Evérard Daigle, 96, Canadian politician, New Brunswick MLA (1974–1987).
- Cathy Daley, 66, Canadian visual artist and educator.
- Kenneth Duberstein, 77, American lobbyist, White House chief of staff (1988–1989).
- Edward Gold, 85, American composer and pianist, complications from dementia.
- Eberhard Goldhahn, 94, German politician, MP (1990).
- Roger Graef, 85, American-born British documentary filmmaker, cancer.
- William Jolitz, 65, American software programmer, developer of the 386BSD operating system, sarcoma.
- Milton Klein, 98, American nuclear engineer.
- Oleksandr Korpan, 27, Ukrainian military pilot, shot down.
- Alan Ladd Jr., 84, American film producer (Braveheart, Gone Baby Gone) and studio executive (20th Century Fox), Oscar winner (1996), kidney failure.
- Autherine Lucy, 92, American civil rights activist.
- Chris Madden, 73, American interior designer and television host, head injuries sustained in a fall.
- Moussa Okanla, 71, Beninese scholar and diplomat, minister of foreign affairs (2007–2008).
- Shane Olivea, 40, American football player (San Diego Chargers), heart disease.
- Keith Ortego, 58, American football player (Chicago Bears).
- Jean-Pierre Pernaut, 71, French news reader and broadcaster, lung cancer.
- Robert John Rose, 92, American Roman Catholic prelate, bishop of Gaylord (1981–1989) and Grand Rapids (1989–2003).
- John Stahl, 68, Scottish actor (Game of Thrones, Victoria & Abdul, Take the High Road), cancer.
- Volodymyr Struk, 57, Ukrainian politician, deputy (2012–2014) and mayor of Kreminna (since 2020), shot.
- Frédérick Tristan, 90, French writer and poet.
- Tony Walton, 87, British set and costume designer (Pippin, All That Jazz, Mary Poppins), Oscar and Tony winner, complications from a stroke.

=== 3 ===
- Josef Bauer, 88, Austrian artist.
- Şenol Birol, 86, Turkish football player (Beşiktaş, Fenerbahçe, national team) and manager.
- Yuan-Shih Chow, 97, Chinese-American probabilist.
- Valeriy Chybineyev, 34, Ukrainian army major, killed in battle.
- Frank Connor, 86, Scottish football player (St Mirren, Albion Rovers) and manager (Raith Rovers).
- Tim Considine, 81, American actor (My Three Sons, The Mickey Mouse Club, Patton).
- Angela Crow, 86, British actress (Coronation Street, Grange Hill, Barney Is My Darling).
- Andrea Danyluk, 59, American computer scientist, pancreatic cancer.
- John Duffy, 58, Canadian political strategist and writer.
- Sunday O. Fadulu, 81, Nigerian microbiologist.
- Yona Fischer, 89, Israeli art curator.
- Francesca Gargallo, 65, Italian-born Mexican philosopher, cancer.
- Sir Charles Gray, 79, British barrister and judge.
- Thomas B. Hayward, 97, American Navy admiral, chief of naval operations (1978–1982).
- Bruce Johnstone, 85, South African racing driver.
- Terrence Kaufman, 84, American linguist.
- Le Havre, 16, Irish-born racehorse and sire.
- Oddvar J. Majala, 89, Norwegian politician, MP (1981–1989).
- Walter Mears, 87, American journalist (Associated Press), Pulitzer Prize winner (1977), cancer.
- Abune Merkorios, 83, Ethiopian Orthodox prelate, patriarch of the Ethiopian Orthodox Tewahedo Church (1988–1991, since 2018).
- Jun Misawa, 69, Japanese baseball player and politician, member of the House of Representatives (1996–2000).
- Denroy Morgan, 76, Jamaican-born American reggae musician, cancer.
- Kyotaro Nishimura, 91, Japanese author, liver cancer.
- Timothy Oulton, 55, British furniture designer.
- Albert Pobor, 65, Croatian football manager (Hrvatski Dragovoljac, Vrbovec, Brežice 1919).
- Clément Richard, 83, Canadian lawyer, businessman, and politician, Quebec MNA (1976–1985).
- Luiz Pinguelli Rosa, 80, Brazilian nuclear physicist.
- Felton Ross, 94, British-American physician and medical missionary.
- William Samb, Papua New Guinean politician, MP (since 2015).
- Bruno Saul, 90, Estonian politician.
- Otto Schweizer, 97, German footballer (Bayern Munich).
- Heinz Wassermann, 82, German footballer (Rot-Weiss Essen, Mainz 05).
- Maryan Wisniewski, 85, French footballer (Lens, Sochaux, national team).
- Dean Woods, 55, Australian cyclist, Olympic champion (1984).
- Indra Yasin, 67, Indonesian politician, regent of North Gorontalo (since 2012).
- Rich Yonakor, 63, American basketball player (San Antonio Spurs).

=== 4 ===
- Guido Anzile, 93, Italian-born French road racing cyclist.
- Anne Beaumanoir, 98, French neurophysiologist, Resistance member during World War II, Righteous Among the Nations (1996).
- Ruth Bidgood, 99, Welsh poet.
- Willy Buer, 93, Norwegian footballer (Odd, Lyn, national team).
- Terry Cooney, 88, American baseball umpire (MLB).
- Iwan Edwards, 84, British-born Canadian choral conductor.
- Robert Faricy, 95, American Jesuit priest and theologian.
- Joel Gerber, 81, American judge.
- Miguel Grinberg, 84, Argentine writer, poet, and journalist.
- Jean-Guy Guilbault, 90, Canadian politician, MP (1984–1993).
- Jimbeau Hinson, 70, American country music singer-songwriter.
- Wilhelm Huberts, 84, Austrian football player (Grazer AK, Eintracht Frankfurt, national team) and manager.
- Dai Jones, 78, Welsh television presenter (Cefn Gwlad).
- Elsa Klensch, 92, Australian-born American journalist and television presenter (Style with Elsa Klensch).
- Valentin Knysh, 84, Russian politician, deputy (1995–2003).
- Juan Pablo de Laiglesia, 73, Spanish diplomat, state secretary for international cooperation (2018–2020) and president of AECID (2018–2020).
- Colin Lewis, 79, British Olympic racing cyclist (1964), cancer.
- Stewart Lord, 81, Australian footballer (Geelong).
- Peter Marcuse, 93, German-American lawyer and urban planner.
- Paula Marosi, 85, Hungarian fencer, Olympic champion (1964).
- Rod Marsh, 74, Australian Hall of Fame cricket player (Western Australia, national team) and coach, heart attack.
- Keven McKenna, 77, American politician, member of the Rhode Island House of Representatives (1979–1985) and president of the Rhode Island Constitutional Convention (1985–1986).
- Juan Carlos Muñiz, 37, Mexican journalist, shot.
- Ed Ochiena, 84, Canadian football player (Toronto Argonauts, Hamilton Tiger-Cats).
- Bill Phipps, 79, Canadian religious leader, moderator of the United Church of Canada (1997–2000).
- Renee Poussaint, 77, American television journalist.
- James Remnant, 3rd Baron Remnant, 91, British hereditary peer, member of the House of Lords (1967–1999).
- Sunith Francis Rodrigues, 88, Indian military officer, chief of the army staff (1990–1993), chairman of COSC (1991–1993) and governor of Punjab (2004–2010).
- Mitchell Ryan, 88, American actor (Dark Shadows, Dharma & Greg, Lethal Weapon), heart failure.
- Paul Shefflin, 41, Irish hurler (Ballyhale Shamrocks).
- Karl Swan, 90, American politician, member of the Utah State Senate (1971–1991).
- Shane Warne, 52, Australian Hall of Fame cricketer (Victoria, Hampshire, national team), delivered the Ball of the Century, heart attack.
- Hugh Webster, 78, American politician.

=== 5 ===
- Masood Akhtar, 81, Pakistani actor (Shabana, Watan Kay Rakhwalay, Moosa Khan), lung cancer.
- Lynda Baron, 82, British actress (Open All Hours, Come Outside, EastEnders).
- Elguja Burduli, 80, Georgian actor (Dark Eyes, The Sun of the Sleepless, A Chef in Love) and singer.
- Agostino Cacciavillan, 95, Italian Roman Catholic cardinal, president of the Administration of the Patrimony of the Apostolic See (1998–2002).
- Dennis Cunningham, 86, American civil rights lawyer.
- Luz Fernandez, 86, Filipino actress (Feng Shui, The Ghost Bride, Mang Kepweng Returns) and television presenter, cardiac arrest.
- Takashi Hikino, 71, Japanese economist.
- Adrienne L. Kaeppler, 86, American anthropologist and author.
- Lil Bo Weep, 22, Australian rapper and singer.
- Antonio Martino, 79, Italian politician, deputy (1994–2018), minister of foreign affairs (1994–1995) and defence (2001–2006).
- Gladys Moisés, 60, Argentine lawyer and politician, cancer.
- Immanuel Ngatjizeko, 69, Namibian politician, MP (since 2000).
- Patricio Renán, 77, Chilean singer.
- Roberto Rivas Reyes, 67, Nicaraguan magistrate, president of the Supreme Electoral Council (2000–2018), sepsis and COVID-19.
- Sally Schmitt, 90, American restaurateur, founder of The French Laundry.
- Taro Shigaki, 70, Japanese actor (Shin Heike Monogatari, Hans Christian Andersen's The Little Mermaid, Swan Lake), heart failure.
- Nils Dag Strømme, 76, Norwegian Olympic boxer (1968, 1972).
- James W. Truran, 81, American physicist.
- Colin Wesley, 84, South African cricketer (national team), complications from a stroke.
- Roy Winston, 81, American football player (Minnesota Vikings).
- Zhang Zhongxian, 96, Chinese military officer, political commissar of Guangzhou Military Region (1985–1992).
- Vladimir Zhoga, 28, Ukrainian Sparta Battalion commander, killed in battle.

=== 6 ===
- Ahmad Muhammad Al-Khatib, 95, Kuwaiti doctor and politician, MP (1963–1965, 1971–1976, 1985–1996).
- Robbie Brightwell, 82, British sprinter, Olympic silver medalist (1964).
- Celeste Gold Broughton, 96, American writer and socialite.
- Bhim Prasad Dahal, 67, Indian politician, MP (1996–2004), renal failure.
- Alan R. Drengson, 87–88, Canadian philosopher.
- Hubert Fattal, 51, Lebanese businessman and perfumer, stabbed.
- Frank Fleming, 68, American politician, member of the Montana House of Representatives (since 2018).
- Jean-Antoine Fiori, 39, French rally driver, racing accident.
- Kjell Grengmark, 87, Swedish curler.
- Berty Gunathilake, 97, Sri Lankan actor (Cheriyo Captain, Somy Boys, Vala In London) and comedian.
- Kenneth Ives, 87, British actor (Doctor Who) and director (Poldark, Secret Army).
- June Kirby, 94, American actress (Kismet, Guys and Dolls) and model.
- Margit Korondi, 89, Hungarian gymnast, Olympic champion (1952, 1956).
- Luc Laventure, 77, French journalist, director of France Ô and La Première.
- Pavlo Lee, 33, Ukrainian actor and television presenter, bombing.
- Mao Yongze, 91, Chinese nuclear engineer, member of the Chinese Academy of Engineering.
- Geraldo Melo, 86, Brazilian businessman and politician, senator (1995–2003), governor of Rio Grande do Norte (1987–1991), lung cancer.
- Frank O'Farrell, 94, Irish football player (West Ham, national team) and manager (Manchester United).
- John Parlett, 96, British Olympic runner (1948).
- Andrew Reddy, 89, Irish Olympic boxer (1952, 1960).
- Pau Riba i Romeva, 73, Spanish musician, pancreatic cancer.
- Sayed Hyder Ali Shihab Thangal, 74, Indian Islamic scholar, cancer.
- Giuseppe Wilson, 76, Italian footballer (Internapoli, Lazio, national team), stroke.

=== 7 ===
- Paul Anderson, 87, British sailor, Olympic bronze medalist (1968).
- Per Magnar Arnstad, 84, Norwegian politician and entrepreneur.
- Vasily Astafyev, 102, Russian Soviet army colonel.
- Ramón Báez Romano, 93, Dominican golfer and politician.
- Max Benker, 89, Swiss Olympic gymnast.
- George Boscawen, 9th Viscount Falmouth, 102, British peer, member of the House of Lords (1962–1999).
- Berkrerk Chartvanchai, 77, Thai boxer, WBA flyweight champion (1970).
- Sir Jeremy Child, 3rd Baronet, 77, British actor (Privilege, The Stud, Darkest Hour).
- Renny Cushing, 69, American politician, four-time member of the New Hampshire House of Representatives, prostate cancer complicated by COVID-19.
- José Ricardo Díaz Pardeiro, 77, Spanish historian.
- John F. Dunlap, 99, American politician, member of the California State Assembly (1967–1974) and senate (1974–1978).
- Robert M. Farnsworth, 92, American author and academic.
- Olegario Farrés, 87, Paraguayan Olympic sport shooter.
- Avraham Hirschson, 81, Israeli politician, MK (1983–1984, 1992–2009), minister of finance (2006–2007).
- István T. Horváth, 68, Hungarian American chemist.
- Mia Ikumi, 42, Japanese manga artist (Tokyo Mew Mew, Super Doll Licca-chan), subarachnoid hemorrhage.
- Charles Mansolillo, 72, American lawyer and politician, member of the Rhode Island House of Representatives (1973–1975).
- Oleksandr Marchenko, 57, Ukrainian politician, deputy (2014–2019), killed in battle.
- Geoffrey Thorndike Martin, 87, British Egyptologist.
- Jean Mouchel, 93, French politician, MEP (1982–1983, 1984–1989).
- Nadungamuwa Raja, 69, Sri Lankan elephant, heart attack.
- Christy O'Brien, 88, Irish hurler (Borris-in-Ossory, Laois).
- Benjamín Prado Casas, 96, Chilean politician, senator (1965–1973).
- Yuriy Prylypko, 61, Ukrainian politician, mayor of Hostomel (since 2015), shot.
- Sumy Sadurni, 32, Chilean photojournalist, traffic collision.
- Donna Scheeder, 74, American librarian, president of IFLA (2015–2017), cancer.
- Shahnawaz Tanai, 72, Afghan military officer and politician, minister of defence (1988–1990) and chief of the general staff (1988–1990).
- Rafiq Tarar, 92, Pakistani jurist and politician, president (1998–2001), senator (1997–1998) and justice of the Supreme Court (1991–1994), heart attack.
- Teng Jinxian, 84, Chinese film director, producer, and screenwriter.
- Héctor Vargas Bastidas, 70, Chilean Roman Catholic prelate, bishop of Arica (2003–2013) and Temuco (since 2013).
- Jan Welmers, 84, Dutch composer and organist.
- Jesús Zúñiga, 74, Mexican politician, mayor of Unión de Tula (1987–1988), deputy (2015–2018) and member of the Congress of Jalisco (2018–2021), shot.

=== 8 ===
- Nelson W. Aldrich Jr., 86, American author.
- Joseph R. Bowen, 71, American politician, member of the Kentucky Senate (2011–2019), heart attack.
- Tomás Boy, 70, Mexican footballer (Tigres UANL, Atlético Español, national team), pulmonary embolism.
- Desislav Chukolov, 47, Bulgarian politician, MEP (2007–2009).
- René Clemencic, 94, Austrian composer.
- Patrick Duggan, 86, Irish actor (Deathstalker).
- Margaret Farrow, 87, American politician, member of the Wisconsin State Assembly (1986–1989) and Senate (1989–2001), lieutenant governor of Wisconsin (2001–2003).
- Annah Faulkner, 72, Australian novelist.
- Go for Gin, 30, American racehorse, Kentucky Derby winner (1994), heart failure.
- Grandpa Elliott, 77, American musician, complications from skin infection.
- Johnny Grier, 74, American football official (NFL).
- Ad Havermans, 87, Dutch politician, mayor of The Hague (1985–1996).
- Ghanam Al-Jumhur, 90–91, Kuwaiti politician, MP (1963–1999).
- Gordon Lee, 87, English football player (Aston Villa) and manager (Newcastle United, Everton).
- Fernando Carlos Maletti, 72, Argentine Roman Catholic prelate, bishop of San Carlos de Barlioche (2001–2013) and Merlo–Moreno (since 2013).
- Sergei Mandreko, 50, Russian-Tajik football player (Rapid Wien, VfL Bochum, Russia national team) and manager, complications from amyotrophic lateral sclerosis.
- Leo Marx, 102, American historian.
- Georges Michel, 75, French rugby union player (Tarbes Stadoceste).
- Ron Miles, 58, American jazz musician, complications from polycythemia vera.
- Mun Jong-nam, North Korean diplomat, ambassador to Italy (2017) and Syria (since 2018), stroke.
- Gyo Obata, 99, American architect.
- Ron Pember, 87, British actor (Secret Army, Oh! What a Lovely War, Murder by Decree), stage director, and dramatist.
- Luiz Cláudio Pereira, 60, Brazilian shot putter, Paralympic champion (1992).
- Valeriy Petrov, 67, Ukrainian football player (Atlantyka Sevastopol, Tavriya Simferopol) and manager, COVID-19.
- Jim Richards, 75, American football player (New York Jets).
- Volodymyr Rohovsky, 68, Ukrainian footballer (Lokomotyv Kherson, Shakhtar Donetsk, national team). (death announced on this date)
- Maria Simon, 103, Austrian sociologist.
- Peter Smithwick, 85, Irish judge (Smithwick Tribunal).
- Sargur Srihari, 72, Indian-American scientist, complications from glioblastoma.
- Ron Stander, 77, American boxer, complications from diabetes.
- Kateryna Stupnytska, 25, Ukrainian military officer, missile attack.
- Isao Suzuki, 89, Japanese jazz double-bassist, COVID-19.
- Oleh Svynchuk, 29, Ukrainian soldier, missile attack.
- Serhii Vasich, 50, Ukrainian soldier, missile attack.
- Dominique Warluzel, 64, French-born Swiss lawyer and playwright.
- Yuriko, 102, American dancer and choreographer.
- Eddy Yusuf, 66, Indonesian politician, regent of Ogan Komering Ulu (2003–2008).

=== 9 ===
- Aijaz Ahmad, 81, Indian-born American Marxist philosopher.
- David Ash, 78, English cricketer (Yorkshire, Cumberland).
- Annerose Baier, 75, German ice dancer.
- Benjamin Chaha, 82, Nigerian politician.
- Justice Christopher, 40, Nigerian footballer (Antwerp, Trelleborg, national team).
- David Crooks, 90, New Zealand air force officer, chief of the air staff (1983–1986), chief of defence staff (1986–1987).
- Inge Deutschkron, 99, German-Israeli journalist and author.
- Joe D'Orazio, 99, British professional wrestler.
- Ron Hansen, 78, Canadian politician, Ontario MPP (1990–1995).
- Hilman Hariwijaya, 57, Indonesian writer.
- Masamitsu Hidaka, 61, Japanese animator (Pokémon).
- Fong Seow Hor, 85, Malaysian Olympic swimmer.
- Serhii Kotenko, 54, Ukrainian military officer, shot.
- John Korty, 85, American film director (The Autobiography of Miss Jane Pittman, Who Are the DeBolts? And Where Did They Get Nineteen Kids?) and animator.
- Jimmy Lydon, 98, American actor (Twice Blessed, Life with Father, The First Hundred Years).
- Burton L. Mack, 90, American biblical scholar.
- Robert McLendon, 85, American politician, member of the Arizona House of Representatives (1983–2001).
- Yves Michalon, 77, French communicator, writer, and publisher.
- James Pickands, 90, American mathematical statistician.
- Donald Pinkel, 95, American pediatrician, director of St. Jude Children's Research Hospital (1962–1973).
- Richard Podolor, 86, American musician (The Pets) and record producer (Steppenwolf, Three Dog Night).
- Marvin J. Roshell, 89, American politician, member of the Wisconsin Senate (1979–1992).
- Vladislav Shoot, 81, Russian-British composer.
- Bernard Talon, 91, French politician, senator (1971–1980).
- Louis Weil, 86, American Episcopal priest and liturgical scholar.
- David Wheeler, 72, American politician, member of the Alabama House of Representatives (since 2018).
- Edwin Zarowin, 95, American track and field coach.

=== 10 ===
- Samuel Bogley, 80, American politician.
- Robert Cardenas, 102, Mexican-born American air force brigadier general.
- Sorapong Chatree, 71, Thai actor (Out of the Darkness, Plae Kao, The Legend of Suriyothai), lung cancer.
- Emilio Delgado, 81, American actor (Sesame Street, I Will Fight No More Forever, A Case of You), multiple myeloma.
- Sir J. H. Elliott, 91, British historian and Hispanist, pneumonia.
- Annie Flanders, 82, American magazine publisher.
- Vladimir Frolov, 54–55, Russian major general.
- León Genuth, 90, Argentine Olympic wrestler (1952).
- Mario Gigante, 98, American mobster (Genovese crime family).
- Georges Ginoux, 88, Belgian-born French politician, senator (2004–2005).
- Gerry Goyer, 85, Canadian ice hockey player (Chicago Blackhawks).
- Jürgen Grabowski, 77, German footballer (Eintracht Frankfurt, West Germany national team).
- Ian Hannaford, 82, Australian footballer (Port Adelaide, South Australia).
- Kimberley Kitching, 52, Australian politician, senator (since 2016).
- Dimitris Kontominas, 82, Greek businessman.
- Magne Landrø, 84, Norwegian Olympic sport shooter (1960, 1964).
- Robert W. Lucky, 86, American electrical engineer and inventor.
- Hiram Maristany, 76, American photographer.
- Gavin Martin, 60, Northern Irish music journalist.
- Zora Martin-Felton, 91, American museum director and curator.
- Bobbie Nelson, 91, American pianist and singer.
- Odalis Pérez, 44, Dominican baseball player (Atlanta Braves, Los Angeles Dodgers, Kansas City Royals), fall.
- Alvard Petrossyan, 75, Armenian writer, philologist and publicist.
- Annerose Schmidt, 85, German classical pianist.
- Mario Terán, 79, Bolivian military warrant officer, executioner of Che Guevara.
- José Vieira, 89, Portuguese Olympic rower.

=== 11 ===
- Rupiah Banda, 85, Zambian politician, president (2008–2011) and vice-president (2006–2008), colon cancer.
- Mohammed Saeed Bekheitan, 77, Syrian politician.
- Sandra Cavalcanti, 96, Brazilian politician, linguist and academic, deputy (1987–1995).
- Guayo Cedeño, 48, Honduran musician and record producer, respiratory failure.
- Frank De Coninck, 77, Belgian diplomat, ambassador to the Holy See (2006–2010).
- Sir William Fittall, 68, British civil servant, secretary general of the Archbishops' Council (2002–2015).
- Paul Genevay, 83, French sprinter, Olympic bronze medalist (1964).
- Giovanni Giuliano, 72, Italian politician, president of the Province of Imperia (2001–2010).
- Arthur A. Goren, 96, American historian.
- Norman K. Gottwald, 95, American political activist and biblical scholar.
- Julian Heicklen, 90, American chemist and civil liberties activist.
- Rustam Ibragimbekov, 83, Azerbaijani screenwriter (White Sun of the Desert, Burnt by the Sun, The Barber of Siberia), film director and producer.
- Jun Kondō, 92, Japanese theoretical physicist (Kondo effect), pneumonia.
- Elizabeth Larner, 89, British actress (Up Pompeii!, Triangle, The Two Ronnies).
- Jacobus Luna, 80, Indonesian politician, regent of Bengkayang (2000–2010).
- Brad Martin, 48, American country singer ("Before I Knew Better"), cirrhosis.
- Michelle Materre, 67, American film distributor and educator.
- Gerardo Rozín, 51, Argentinian journalist and television host (Telefe).
- Roger Sangwin, 84, English rugby union player.
- João Evangelista Martins Terra, 97, Brazilian Roman Catholic prelate, auxiliary bishop of Brasília (1994–2004).
- Timmy Thomas, 77, American R&B singer-songwriter ("Why Can't We Live Together") and musician.
- Laurent Vimont, 61, French businessman.
- Martha Vonk-van Kalker, 78, Dutch politician, senator (1977–1981).
- Nebojša Vučićević, 59, Serbian football player (OFK Beograd, Partizan) and manager (Hajduk Kula).
- Cora Faith Walker, 37, American politician, member of the Missouri House of Representatives (2017–2019), non-ischemic cardiomyopathy.
- Sally Watson, 98, American author.

=== 12 ===
- Dmytro Apukhtin, 44, Ukrainian soldier, shot.
- Barry Bailey, 73, American guitarist (Atlanta Rhythm Section), complications from multiple sclerosis.
- Traci Braxton, 50, American R&B singer (The Braxtons) and television personality (Braxton Family Values), esophageal cancer.
- David Jarrett Collins, 86, American inventor and businessman.
- Vatsala Deshmukh, 92, Indian actress (Toofan Aur Deeya, Ladki Sahyadri Ki, Jal Bin Machhli Nritya Bin Bijli).
- Alan J. Faller, 93, American meteorologist and oceanographer.
- Vera Gissing, 93, Czech-British author and translator.
- Eliezer Goldberg, 90, Israeli jurist, judge of the Supreme Court (1983–1998) and state comptroller (1998–2005).
- Henry Herscovici, 95, Israeli Olympic sports shooter (1968, 1972).
- Valerii Hudz, 51, Ukrainian military officer.
- Dragoljub Jeremić, 43, Serbian footballer (Partizan, Radnički Kragujevac, Bežanija).
- Kandikonda, 48, Indian lyricist (Itlu Sravani Subramanyam, Idiot, Satyam), throat cancer.
- Pentti Karvonen, 90, Finnish Olympic steeplechase runner (1960).
- Colin Kitching, 88, Australian Olympic footballer.
- Alain Krivine, 80, French politician, MEP (1999–2004).
- Fujiya Matsumoto, 89, Japanese Olympic sailor (1964).
- Marshall W. Moore, 92, American politician, member of the North Dakota House of Representatives (1981–1987).
- Robert Vincent O'Neil, 91, American screenwriter, film director (Wonder Women, Angel, Avenging Angel) and producer.
- Karl Offmann, 81, Mauritian politician, president (2002–2003).
- George Pease, 4th Baron Gainford, 95, British architect and nobleman.
- Chris Pfeiffer, 51, German stunt rider, suicide.
- Biagio Proietti, 81, Italian screenwriter (Death Occurred Last Night, The Killer Reserved Nine Seats, The Black Cat) and film director.
- Selwyn Ryan, 86, Trinidad and Tobago political scientist.
- Günther Schwarz, 80, German politician, member of the Landtag of Saarland (1975–1990).
- Pete St John, 90, Irish folk singer-songwriter ("The Fields of Athenry", "The Rare Ould Times").
- Av Westin, 92, American television producer (CBS Morning News).
- Jessica Williams, 73, American jazz pianist and composer.

=== 13 ===
- Quinn H. Becker, 91, American army lieutenant general.
- Erhard Busek, 80, Austrian politician, vice-chancellor (1991–1995).
- Chiang Chen, 98, Hong Kong industrialist, founder and chairman (1958–2018) of Chen Hsong.
- Vic Elford, 86, British racing driver, cancer.
- Gerry Frank, 99, American businessman, journalist and civil servant.
- Gary Gresdal, 75, Canadian ice hockey player (Quebec Nordiques).
- Paul Hampshire, 40, Scottish footballer (Raith Rovers, Berwick Rangers, East Fife), traffic collision.
- Anissa Hassouna, 69, Egyptian politician, MP (2016–2020), cancer.
- Leif Hermann, 80, Danish politician, MP (1984–1990).
- Maureen Howard, 91, American novelist, memoirist, and editor.
- William Hurt, 71, American actor (Kiss of the Spider Woman, Broadcast News, The Incredible Hulk), Oscar winner (1986), prostate cancer.
- Ajdar Ismailov, 83, Azerbaijani philologist, co-founder of New Azerbaijan Party.
- Harue Kitamura, 93, Japanese politician, mayor of Ashiya, Hyōgo (1991–2003), aspiration pneumonia.
- Albert Kresch, 99, American painter.
- Pawel Kwiek, 70, Polish photographer.
- Mary Lee, 100, Scottish singer and comedian.
- Li Guangxi, 92, Chinese operatic tenor, stroke.
- Igor Mandić, 82, Croatian writer, literary critic, and columnist.
- Sam Massell, 94, American businessman and politician, mayor of Atlanta (1970–1974).
- Peter McMahon, 90, Australian politician, member of the New South Wales Legislative Council (1973–1981).
- Micaela, Countess of Paris, 83, Chilean-Spanish aristocrat.
- Christopher Moore, 70, American preservationist, complications from COVID-19 and pneumonia.
- Antonio Nachura, 80, Filipino jurist, associate justice of the Supreme Court (2007–2011), solicitor general (2006–2007) and deputy (1998–2004).
- Bernard Nussbaum, 84, American attorney, White House Counsel (1993–1994).
- Adam Odzimek, 77, Polish Roman Catholic prelate, auxiliary bishop of Sandomierz (1985–1992) and Radom (1992–2019).
- Brent Renaud, 50, American photojournalist, writer (The New York Times), and filmmaker (Warrior Champions: From Baghdad to Beijing), shot.
- Ľubomír Roman, 77, Slovak actor (St. Peter's Umbrella, The Sun in a Net, Soul at Peace) and politician, member of the National Council (1994–1998), minister of culture (1994).
- Aliaksiej Skoblia, 31, Belarusian soldier (Armed Forces of Ukraine).
- Tang Chuan, 69, Taiwanese actor (All in 700, Let's Go Crazy on LIVE!, Gold Leaf) and television producer.
- Stephen Tarabalka, 29, Ukrainian fighter pilot (Ghost of Kyiv), shot down.
- Sandra Warner, 87, American actress (Mr. Smith Goes to Washington, Some Like It Hot, Ask Any Girl) and model.

=== 14 ===
- Brigitte Chamarande, 66, French actress (Subway, L'Étudiante, Betty), bone cancer.
- Martin Parfait Aimé Coussoud-Mavoungou, 62, Congolese businessman and politician, complications from liver surgery.
- Michael Cudahy, 97, American entrepreneur and philanthropist.
- Terry Dunleavy, 93, New Zealand winemaker.
- Jason Edwards, 52, Australian rugby league player (Newcastle Knights).
- Jack R. Gannon, 85, American author and deaf culture historian.
- Charles Greene, 76, American sprinter, Olympic champion (1968).
- Scott Hall, 63, American Hall of Fame professional wrestler (WWF, WCW, TNA), complications from hip surgery.
- Dave Hill, 81, American football player (Kansas City Chiefs).
- Sharif Ali bin al-Hussein, 65, Iraqi royal and politician.
- Kenichi Itō, 84, Japanese diplomat and political scientist, pneumonia.
- Kumudben Joshi, 88, Indian politician, MP (1973–1985), governor of Andhra Pradesh (1985–1990).
- Anil Joshiyara, 68, Indian politician, Gujarat MLA (since 1995), complications from COVID-19.
- Mykola Kravchenko, 38, Ukrainian politician and soldier.
- Eileen Mackevich, 82, American historian.
- Jorge Silva Melo, 73, Portuguese theatre director and playwright, co-founder of Teatro da Cornucópia.
- Eric Mercury, 77, Canadian singer, songwriter and musician.
- Marilyn Miglin, 83, American entrepreneur, inventor and television host (Home Shopping Network).
- Bill Miller, 92, American politician, member of the North Carolina Senate (2006–2007), complications from pneumonia.
- Sandeep Nangal Ambian, 38, British-Indian kabaddi player (national team), shot.
- Miriam Hederman O'Brien, 89, Irish barrister and academic.
- Peter Padfield, 89, Indian-born British naval historian and author.
- José Ramiro Pellecer Samayoa, 92, Guatemalan Roman Catholic prelate, auxiliary bishop of Guatemala (1967–2010).
- Michael F. Price, 70, American value investor and philanthropist.
- Azizur Rahman, 82, Bangladeshi film director (Ashikkhito, Chhutir Ghonta).
- Morten Schakenda, 55, Norwegian baker, lung cancer.
- Francisco Solís Peón, 53, Mexican politician, Mexico City MLA (2000–2003), complications from COVID-19.
- Pervis Spann, 89, American broadcaster, music promoter and radio personality (WVON).
- David Stephenson, 63, English rugby player (Salford, Wigan Warriors, national team).
- Mina Swaminathan, 88, Indian educationist.
- Akira Takarada, 87, Japanese actor (Godzilla, Life of an Expert Swordsman, A-Ge-Man: Tales of a Golden Geisha).
- Steve Wilhite, 74, American computer scientist, inventor of the GIF, COVID-19.
- Popó Vaz, 37, Brazilian police officer and digital influencer.

=== 15 ===
- Cabo Anselmo, 80, Brazilian navy officer and informant, leader of 1964 Sailors' Revolt.
- Thomas Barnett, 85, English footballer (Romford, Crystal Palace, St Albans City).
- Arturo Bonín, 78, Argentine actor (Asesinato en el Senado de la Nación).
- Arnold W. Braswell, 96, American air force lieutenant general.
- Piet Bukman, 88, Dutch politician, minister of defence (1988) and agriculture (1990–1994), Speaker of the House of Representatives (1994–1998).
- Lauro Cavazos, 95, American politician, secretary of education (1988–1990).
- Gordon Cooper, 91, American football player.
- Jean-Pierre Corteggiani, 79, French Egyptologist (The Pyramids of Giza: Facts, Legends and Mysteries).
- C. William Gear, 87, British-American mathematician.
- Dennis González, 67, American jazz trumpeter.
- Mohammad Alavi Gorgani, 81–82, Iraqi-born Iranian grand ayatollah.
- Marrio Grier, 50, American football player (New England Patriots).
- Barbara Maier Gustern, 87, American vocal coach, brain injuries.
- Til Hazel, 91, American real estate developer.
- Jürgen W. Heike, 73, German politician, member of the Landtag of Bavaria (1994–2018).
- Randy J. Holland, 75, American judge, member of the Delaware Supreme Court (1986–2017).
- Joan Langdon, 99, Canadian Olympic swimmer (1936).
- Lu Liang-Huan, 85, Taiwanese golfer.
- Ma Shaoxin, 86, Chinese actor (Decisive Engagement: The Liaoxi-Shenyang Campaign).
- Tony Marchi, 89, English football player (Tottenham Hotspur, Vicenza) and manager (Northampton Town).
- Norpipah Abdol, 67, Malaysian politician, Malacca State MLA (2008–2018), complications from cancer and COVID-19.
- Nina Novak, 94, Polish-born Venezuelan ballerina and choreographer.
- Patrick Osakwe, 73, Nigerian politician, senator (1999–2011).
- Eugene Parker, 94, American solar physicist (Parker Solar Probe).
- Jean Potvin, 72, Canadian ice hockey player (New York Islanders, Philadelphia Flyers, Minnesota North Stars) and radio broadcaster, Stanley Cup champion (1980, 1981).
- Vic Preston Jr, 71, Kenyan rally driver.
- Anneli Sauli, 89, Finnish actress (Miriam, Doctor Sibelius, The Man Without a Past).
- Bob Williams, 80, American politician, member of the Washington House of Representatives (1979–1983, 1983–1989).

=== 16 ===
- Denis Baylor, 82, American neurobiologist, cardiac arrhythmia.
- Egidius Braun, 97, German football administrator, president of the DFB (1992–2001).
- Chen Jingxiong, 100, Chinese engineer, member of the Chinese Academy of Engineering.
- Walter Coblenz, 93, American film producer (All the President's Men, The Candidate, The Onion Field).
- William Conan Davis, 95, American physical chemist.
- Merri Dee, 85, American journalist (WGN-TV).
- Vic Fazio, 79, American politician, chair of the House Democratic Caucus (1995–1999), member of the U.S. House of Representatives (1979–1999), melanoma.
- Andy Geddes, 62, Scottish footballer (Dundee), cancer.
- Syed Makbul Hossain, 75, Bangladeshi politician, MP (1986–1988, 2001–2006).
- Dzintars Jaundžeikars, 66, Latvian politician, minister of the interior (2005–2006) and MP (2002–2010).
- Dick Knostman, 90, American basketball player (Syracuse Nationals).
- Shankarrao Genuji Kolhe, 92, Indian politician, Maharashtra MLA (1972–1984, 1990–2004).
- Natta Konysheva, 86, Russian painter.
- Richard Lipez, 83, American journalist and author, pancreatic cancer.
- Graham McColl, 87, Australian footballer (Carlton).
- Margaret M. McGowan, 90, British historian.
- Ben Micah, Papua New Guinean politician.
- Mish Michaels, 53, Indian-born American meteorologist (WHDH, The Weather Channel).
- Shamaa Mohammed, 64, Omani television actress, heart attack.
- Alton Morgan, 89, American politician, member of the Maine House of Representatives (1997–1999).
- Barbara Morrison, 72, American jazz singer.
- Pierce Mullen, 88, American historian.
- Phillis Nolan, 76, Irish lawn bowler, world champion (1988, 1992, 1996).
- Pierre Pichette, 68, Canadian sledge hockey player, Paralympic silver medalist (1998).
- Kendall Rhine, 79, American basketball player (Kentucky Colonels, Houston Mavericks), cancer.
- Józef Różański, 90, Polish politician, MP (1976–1985).
- Khaled Khalifa Al-Shammari, 65, Kuwaiti Olympic runner.
- Slobodan Škrbić, 77, Serbian footballer (Red Star Belgrade, Lille OSC, Yugoslavia national team).
- Kunimitsu Takahashi, 82, Japanese racing driver, motorcyclist, and team owner, four-time All-Japan Sports Prototype champion, lymphoma.
- Ralph Terry, 86, American baseball player (New York Yankees, Kansas City Athletics, New York Mets). World Series champion (1961, 1962), complications from head injury.
- Helene Vannari, 73, Estonian actress (Rahu tänav, All My Lenins, Mindless).
- Pete Ward, 84, Canadian-born American baseball player (Chicago White Sox, New York Yankees, Baltimore Orioles).
- Bobby Weinstein, 82, American songwriter ("Goin' Out of My Head", "It's Gonna Take a Miracle", "I'm on the Outside (Looking In)").

=== 17 ===
- Christopher Alexander, 85, Austrian-born British-American architect and design theorist.
- Pascal Beaudet, 65, French politician, member of the Departmental Council of Seine-Saint-Denis (2015–2021), mayor of Aubervilliers (2003–2008, 2014–2016).
- Ingeborg Botnen, 88, Norwegian politician, MP (1981–1993).
- Peter Bowles, 85, English actor (Rumpole of the Bailey, To the Manor Born, The Bounder), cancer.
- Emmett C. Burns Jr., 81, American politician, member of the Maryland House of Delegates (1995–2015).
- Clemens Cornielje, 63, Dutch politician, MP (1994–2005), King's commissioner of Gelderland (2005–2019), brain tumor.
- Artem Datsyshyn, 43, Ukrainian ballet dancer, missile attack.
- Jean-Pierre Demailly, 64, French mathematician.
- Domenico DeMarco, 85, Italian pizzaiolo, founder of Di Fara Pizza.
- Piotr Drzewiecki, 71, Polish footballer (Ruch Chorzów, national team).
- Vaughn Flora, 77, American politician, member of the Kansas House of Representatives (1995–2008), cancer.
- Sir Wira Gardiner, 78, New Zealand soldier, public servant and writer.
- Dru C. Gladney, 65, American anthropologist.
- Bill Johnson, 65, American author, complications from Marfan syndrome.
- Jaroslav Kurzweil, 95, Czech mathematician.
- Edward Harding MacBurney, 94, American Anglican prelate, bishop of Quincy (1988–1994).
- Bobby Nalzaro, 58, Filipino journalist and radio presenter (DYSS).
- Tony Nash, 85, British bobsledder, Olympic champion (1964).
- Gerrit Noordzij, 90, Dutch typographer.
- Martha Palafox Gutiérrez, 73, Mexican politician, deputy (1997–2000, 2003–2006) and senator (2012–2018).
- Elsa Papadimitriou, 80, Greek politician, MP (1993–2011).
- Alan Rees, 84, Welsh rugby player (national team) and cricketer (Glamorgan).
- Jean-Luc Ribar, 57, French footballer (Saint-Étienne, Stade Rennais).
- Tadao Sato, 91, Japanese film critic, theorist and historian.
- David Schmeidler, 82–83, Israeli mathematician and economic theorist.
- Oksana Shvets, 67, Ukrainian actress, missile attack.
- Jean Simonet, 94, Belgian Olympic runner.
- Hisanori Takada, 40, Japanese footballer (FF Lillehammer, Persitara, Pegasus), fall.
- Ramdeo Singh Yadav, 75, Indian politician, Bihar MLA (1980–1995), heart attack.
- Yuri Vechkasov, 73, Russian politician, senator (1996–2001).

=== 18 ===
- Ahmad Daifallah Al-Azeib, Yemeni diplomat.
- Harold Akin, 77, American football player (San Diego Chargers).
- Aleksei Bakharev, 45, Russian-Ukrainian footballer (Lada-Tolyatti, Rotor Volgograd, Shakhtar Donetsk).
- Tom Barrise, 68, American basketball coach (New Jersey Nets).
- David Callender, 91, British Olympic rower.
- Antonio Castro Leache, 77, Spanish politician, member of the Valencian Courts (1987–1999).
- Kelly Cherry, 81, American author and poet.
- Erik Christensen, 90, American football player (Washington Redskins).
- John Clayton, 67, American Hall of Fame sportswriter (The Pittsburgh Press, The News Tribune) and reporter (ESPN).
- Ezio Damolin, 77, Italian Olympic skier (1964, 1968, 1972).
- Bob Daniels, 86, American basketball coach (Kentucky Wesleyan Panthers).
- Murray Day, 90, New Zealand squash administrator, president of the World Squash Federation (1975–1981).
- Alfons Dirnberger, 80, Austrian footballer (national team).
- John Arthur Eaves, 85, American politician, member of the Mississippi House of Representatives (1972–1976).
- Jaap Flier, 88, Dutch dancer and choreographer.
- Glen Glenn, 87, American rockabilly singer.
- Goonew, 24, American rapper, shot.
- Lenard Gustafson, 88, Canadian politician, MP (1979–1993) and senator (1993–2008).
- Eugene E. Habiger, 82, American general.
- Oddrun Hokland, 79, Norwegian Olympic athlete (1964).
- Chaim Kanievsky, 94, Polish-born Israeli Haredi rabbi.
- Andy Lochhead, 81, Scottish footballer (Burnley, Aston Villa, Leicester City).
- Alex MacLellan, 91, Canadian ice hockey player (Michigan Wolverines).
- Bernabé Martí, 93, Spanish tenor.
- Pepper Martin, 85, Canadian-American professional wrestler (NWA) and actor (Superman II, The Rockford Files).
- George McCallum, 86, Scottish footballer (Third Lanark).
- Nan Melville, 72, American photographer.
- George Montague, 98, British LGBT rights activist.
- Philippe Nassif, 50, French journalist and philosopher, suicide.
- Younes Nazarian, 91, Iranian-American investor and philanthropist.
- Robert Prentiss, 85, American politician, member of the New York State Assembly (1995–2005).
- Borys Romanchenko, 96, Ukrainian Holocaust survivor, bombing.
- Andrei Soluyanov, 62, Russian politician, deputy (1995–1999).
- Åge Sørensen, 84, Norwegian footballer (Vålerenga, national team).
- Bobby Starr, 85, American singer (The Intruders).
- Budi Tek, 65, Indonesian art collector and philanthropist, pancreatic cancer.
- Sheila Waters, 93, British calligrapher.
- Grigory Yastrebenetsky, 98, Russian sculptor.
- Don Young, 88, American politician, member of the U.S. House of Representatives (since 1973), Alaska Senate (1971–1973), and House of Representatives (1967–1971).

=== 19 ===
- Shahabuddin Ahmed, 92, Bangladeshi jurist and politician, president (1990–1991, 1996–2001) and chief justice (1990–1995).
- Federico Martín Aramburú, 42, Argentine rugby union player (US Dax, Glasgow Warriors, national team), shot.
- Bill Archie, 92, American college football coach (Norfolk State).
- Joseph Baber, 84, American composer and violist.
- William C. Camp, 76, American politician, member of the New Mexico House of Representatives (1985–1989).
- Pierre Carron, 89, French sculptor and painter.
- Lyell Cresswell, 77, New Zealand composer, liver cancer complicated by COVID-19.
- Tom Duffy, 92, Irish circus ringmaster.
- Joel Hasse Ferreira, 77, Portuguese politician, MEP (2004–2009) and five-time deputy.
- Linda Garrou, 79, American politician, member of the North Carolina Senate (1999–2013).
- Pat Goss, 80, American mechanic and television presenter (MotorWeek).
- Luis Guinot, 86, American diplomat.
- Dilara Hashem, 85, Bangladeshi novelist.
- He Luli, 87, Chinese politician and paediatrician, vice chairperson of the CPPCC (1996–1998) and Standing Committee of the NPC (1998–2008).
- Alan Hopgood, 87, Australian actor (Bellbird, Prisoner, Neighbours), producer, and writer, prostate cancer.
- Ben Jordan, 90, American Hall of Fame bull rider.
- Michail Jurowski, 76, Russian conductor (Nordwestdeutsche Philharmonie, Leipzig Opera).
- Paul Kavanagh, Irish businessman and politician, senator (1989).
- Roberts Ķīlis, 54, Latvian politician and social anthropologist, minister for education and science (2011–2013).
- John Michael Małek, 93, Polish-American engineer.
- Bill McLennan, 80, Australian statistician.
- Scoey Mitchell, 92, American actor (Barefoot in the Park, Rhoda), comedian, and director.
- Ku Pao-ming, 71, Taiwanese actor (Letter 1949, The Village of No Return, End of Summer) and comedian, heart failure.
- Tom Moody, 60s, American visual artist, critic and blogger, complications from COVID-19.
- Pierre Naftule, 61, Swiss writer and theatre director, complications from amytrophic lateral sclerosis.
- Ansah Owusu, 42, English footballer (Raith Rovers, Bristol Rovers, Chelmsford City).
- Bruce Rigsby, 84–85, American-Australian anthropologist.
- Winfield W. Scott Jr., 94, American military officer, superintendent of the United States Air Force Academy (1983–1987).
- Dave Sims, 52, English rugby union player (Gloucester, Exeter Chiefs, national team).
- Mallu Swarajyam, 91, Indian politician, Andhra Pradesh MLA (1978–1987), multiple organ failure.
- Marian Zembala, 72, Polish surgeon, academic and politician, deputy (2015–2019).

=== 20 ===
- Abdullah Al-Nibari, 85, Kuwaiti politician, MP (1971–1976, 1992–1999).
- Raimon Carrasco, 98, Spanish football executive, president of FC Barcelona (1977–1978).
- Marina Goldovskaya, 80, Russian-American documentary film director, academic, and cinematographer.
- Eric Hall, 89, British Olympic racewalker (1956, 1960).
- Adriana Hoffmann, 82, Chilean botanist, environmentalist, and author.
- Richard Labonté, 72, Canadian writer and editor, stomach cancer.
- Debra Majeed, 68, American religious historian and activist, complications following surgery.
- Miguel Navarro, 92, Spanish Olympic distance runner (1960).
- Jacob Oulanyah, 56, Ugandan politician, speaker of the parliament (since 2021).
- Andrei Paliy, 51, Russian military officer, killed in combat.
- Brent Petrus, 46, American football player (New York Dragons), epilepsy.
- Arnaldo Rosa Prata, 94, Brazilian politician, mayor of Uberaba (1971–1973).
- John Purvis, 83, British politician, MEP (1979–1984, 1999–2009), cancer.
- Ralph Riach, 86, Scottish actor (Hamish Macbeth, Chancer, Cloud Atlas).
- John V. Roach, 83, American microcomputer pioneer, led development of the TRS-80.
- Adam Shakoor, 74, American lawyer, jurist and activist.
- Howard C. Tibbals, 85, American sculptor (The Howard Bros. Circus).
- Gaétan Turcotte, 67, Canadian Olympic water polo player (1976).
- Vijjota, 92, Burmese Buddhist monk, thathanabaing (since 2017).
- Zaki Fatin Abdel Wahab, 61, Egyptian actor (The Sixth Day, Alexandria Again and Forever, Mercedes) and film director.
- Wen Shengchang, 100, Chinese oceanographer and academic (Ocean University of China), member of the Chinese Academy of Sciences.
- Reine Wisell, 80, Swedish racing driver.
- Don Ylvisaker, 88, American mathematical statistician.
- Tom Young, 89, American college basketball coach (Rutgers Scarlet Knights, Catholic University Cardinals, Old Dominion Monarchs).

=== 21 ===
- Yuz Aleshkovsky, 92, Russian-American writer, poet, and singer-songwriter.
- Shinji Aoyama, 57, Japanese film director, screenwriter and composer (EM Embalming, Eureka, Tokyo Park), esophageal cancer.
- Waldemar Bergendahl, 88, Swedish film producer (My Life as a Dog, The Slingshot, Adam & Eva).
- Samuel Cabrera, 61, Colombian road cyclist, lightning strike.
- Yvan Colonna, 61, French Corsican nationalist and convicted murderer, complications from stab wounds.
- Harold Curry, 89, American politician, member of the New Jersey General Assembly (1964–1968).
- Lawrence Dane, 84, Canadian actor (Running, For the Record, Scanners), pancreatic cancer.
- Nolberto Freitas, 77, Uruguayan Olympic boxer.
- Nicholas Furlong, 93, Irish journalist and historian.
- Rosa Gómez de Mejía, 82, Dominican socialite, first lady (2000–2004), heart attack.
- Sara Suleri Goodyear, 68, Pakistani-American writer.
- Kip Hawley, 68, American businessman and government official, administrator of the Transportation Security Administration (2005–2009), lung cancer.
- Gérard Istace, 86, French politician, deputy (1981–1986, 1988–1993).
- Lee Koppelman, 94, American urban planner.
- William Randall Lolley, 90, American Christian clergyman.
- Verne Long, 96, American politician, member of the Minnesota House of Representatives (1963–1974).
- Soumeylou Boubèye Maïga, 67, Malian politician, prime minister (2017–2019) and minister of foreign affairs (2011–2012).
- Vitaly Melnikov, 93, Russian film director (The Elder Son, Poor Poor Paul, The Admirer) and screenwriter.
- Nikolai Osyanin, 80, Russian footballer (Krylia Sovetov Kuybyshev, Spartak Moscow, Soviet Union national team).
- LaShun Pace, 60, American gospel singer, organ failure.
- Mohammad Reyshahri, 75, Iranian politician and cleric, minister of intelligence (1984–1989), member of the Assembly of Experts (since 2016) and prosecutor-general (1991–1993).
- Rodolfo Sacco, 98, Italian legal scholar.
- Carlos Salinas, 83, Peruvian Olympic footballer.
- Eva Ingeborg Scholz, 94, German actress (1-2-3 Corona, The Time with You, The Lost One).
- Raymond Séguy, 92, French Roman Catholic prelate, bishop of Gap (1981–1987) and Autun (1987–2006).
- Tallavajjala Sundaram, 71, Indian stage actor, director, and writer.
- Fevzi Zemzem, 80, Turkish football player (Göztepe, national team) and manager.

=== 22 ===
- Nalie Agustin, 33, Canadian health and wellness advocate, cancer.
- Mohd Azizan Baba, 40, Malaysian football player (Kuala Lumpur, Sarawak) and manager (SAMB).
- Eva Castillo, 52, Filipino singer, kidney disease.
- Robert D. Cess, 89, American atmospheric scientist.
- Terry Darracott, 71, English footballer (Everton, Tulsa Roughnecks, Wrexham).
- Dame Miriam Dell, 97, New Zealand women's advocate.
- Morus Elfryn, 73, Welsh musician and production manager.
- Grindstone, 29, American racehorse, Kentucky Derby winner (1996).
- Elspeth Howe, Baroness Howe of Idlicote, 90, British peer, member of the House of Lords (2001–2020), cancer.
- Tadao Mitome, 83, Japanese photographer, prostate cancer.
- Ted Mooney, 70, American novelist and journalist (Art in America), heart disease.
- Pierre Papadiamandis, 85, French pianist and composer.
- Barrington Patterson, 56, English kickboxer and mixed martial artist, heart attack.
- George Perez, 84, American baseball player (Pittsburgh Pirates).
- Edmund Michał Piszcz, 92, Polish Roman Catholic prelate, archbishop of Warmia (1988–2006).
- Jacques Rougerie, 90, French historian.
- Maxie Santillan Jr., 66, American actor (Pirates of the Caribbean: The Curse of the Black Pearl, The SpongeBob SquarePants Movie, Pair of Kings).
- Sunanda Sanyal, 84, Indian academic, sepsis and multiple organ failure.
- Thiounn Mumm, 96, Cambodian civil servant.
- Milovan Vitezović, 77, Serbian writer, professor and screenwriter.
- Elnardo Webster, 74, American basketball player (UG Gorizia, New York Nets, CB Cajabilbao).
- Zipping, 20, Australian racehorse.

=== 23 ===
- Amina Mohamed Abdi, 40, Somali politician, MP (since 2012), bombing.
- Madeleine Albright, 84, Czechoslovak-born American politician, secretary of state (1997–2001) and ambassador to the United Nations (1993–1997), cancer.
- Auti Angel, 52, American actress (Musical Chairs), singer and dancer, breast cancer.
- Mohamed El-Ashram, 66, Egyptian Olympic wrestler.
- Spartak Borisov, 85, Russian politician, vice president of Sakha (1998–2002) and mayor of Yakutsk (1995–1997).
- Charles G. Boyd, 83, American air force general, lung cancer.
- Rusty Clark, 75, American football player (Edmonton Eskimos, BC Lions).
- Sterling R. Cockrill, 96, American politician, member (1957–1970) and speaker (1967–1968) of the Arkansas House of Representatives.
- Andrzej Cwojdziński, 94, Polish conductor, composer, and music teacher.
- Hassan Dhuhul, Somali politician, MP (since 2012), bombing.
- Boris Dorfman, 98, Romanian-born Ukrainian writer and scholar.
- James Downey, 82, Canadian academic administrator, president of the University of New Brunswick (1980–1990) and the University of Waterloo (1993–1999).
- Raymond C. Eubanks Jr., 88, American politician.
- Dermot Fitzpatrick, 81, Irish politician, TD (1987–1992, 2002–2007) and senator (1997–2002).
- Peter Goddard, 78, Canadian journalist (Toronto Star).
- Trevor Hart, 86, Australian cricketer.
- Guðrún Helgadóttir, 86, Icelandic children's author and politician, speaker of the Althing (1988–2001).
- Kaneaster Hodges Jr., 83, American politician, senator (1977–1979).
- Ivan Hollett, 81, English footballer (Chesterfield, Mansfield Town, Crewe Alexandra).
- Joël Houssin, 68, French author, complications from multiple sclerosis.
- Zinaida Ignatyeva, 84, Russian pianist and music teacher.
- Edward Johnson III, 91, American businessman (Fidelity Investments).
- Russell Kerr, 92, New Zealand ballet dancer, choreographer, and producer.
- Abdul Munim Khaleel, 100, Egyptian military officer.
- Özcan Köksoy, 82, Turkish footballer (Fenerbahçe, Fatih Karagümrük, national team).
- Ramesh Chandra Lahoti, 81, Indian jurist, chief justice (2004–2005).
- Jimmy Lindley, 86, British jockey.
  - Anthony Liu, 34, American Samoan Olympic judoka.
- Som Marandi, 58, Indian politician, MP (1998–1999).
- Busby Noble, 62, New Zealand Māori activist and Antarctic adventurer, cancer.
- John I. Pitt, 85, Australian mycologist, lymphoma.
- William Powell, 74, British barrister and politician, MP (1983–1997).
- Rabindra Kumar Rana, 75, Indian politician, MP (2004–2009).
- Arthur Riggs, 82, American geneticist, cancer.
- Max Walsh, 84, Australian journalist.
- Stan Wilson, 73, Australian cricketer (Western Australia, South Australia).
- Zhang Ziyi, 97, Chinese zootechnician, member of the Chinese Academy of Engineering.

=== 24 ===
- John Andrews, 88, Australian architect (Cameron Offices, CN Tower, Gund Hall).
- Kirk Baptiste, 59, American sprinter, Olympic silver medalist (1984).
- Dieter Bokeloh, 80, German Olympic ski jumper (1964).
- Dagny Carlsson, 109, Swedish blogger and influencer.
- Abhishek Chatterjee, 57, Indian actor (Dahan, Bariwali, Alo), heart attack.
- Chen Chengda, 92, Chinese football player (Shanghai, national team) and manager.
- Denise Coffey, 85, English actress (Waltz of the Toreadors, Georgy Girl, Sir Henry at Rawlinson End), comedian and writer.
- Randy Cornor, 67, American country singer.
- Sergio Costa, 72, Italian-born British businessman, co-founder of Costa Coffee.
- Patricia Ann Ferguson, 86, Scottish civil engineer.
- Johnny Fripp, 101, Canadian skier and football player (Ottawa Rough Riders).
- Oleksandr Harbuz, 19, Ukrainian soldier, execution by gunshot. (death announced on this date)
- Rafael Llopis, 88, Spanish psychiatrist, essayist, and translator.
- Marty Martinello, 91, Canadian football player (Toronto Argonauts, Montreal Alouettes, Hamilton Tiger-Cats).
- Kenny McFadden, 61, American-born New Zealand basketball player and coach (Wellington Saints), kidney disease.
- John McLeod, 88, Scottish composer.
- Richard A. Murphy, 77, American neuroscientist.
- Arcadio Poveda, 91, Mexican astronomer.
- Luis Roldán, 78, Spanish politician and convicted fraudster, director general of the Civil Guard (1986–1993).
- G. Kendall Sharp, 87, American jurist, judge for the U.S. District Court for Middle Florida (since 1983).
- Louie Simmons, 74, American powerlifter and strength coach.
- Gil Stein, 94, American lawyer and ice hockey executive, president of the National Hockey League (1992–1993).
- Olga Sukhenko, 51, Ukrainian politician, village head of Motyzhyn, shot.
- Ivan Yagan, 87, Russian writer.

=== 25 ===
- Grace Alele-Williams, 89, Nigerian academic administrator, vice-chancellor of the University of Benin (1985–1992).
- Birago Balzano, 86, Italian cartoonist (Zora).
- Reza Baraheni, 86, Iranian novelist, poet, and political activist.
- Thalekunnil Basheer, 77, Indian politician, MP (1977–1991).
- Mira Calix, 52, South African-born British visual artist and musician.
- Dr Cann, Ghanaian broadcaster (Happy FM).
- Sir John Chapple, 90, British field marshal, commander-in-chief, land forces (1987–1988), chief of the general staff (1988–1992), and governor of Gibraltar (1993–1995).
- Adebiyi Daramola, 64, Nigerian academic.
- Ivan Dikunov, 80, Russian sculptor, complications from COVID-19.
- Dirck Halstead, 85, American photojournalist (The Digital Journalist).
- Valerie Harris, 86, British Olympic swimmer.
- Taylor Hawkins, 50, American Hall of Fame musician (Foo Fighters, Taylor Hawkins and the Coattail Riders, The Birds of Satan).
- Kathryn Hays, 87, American actress (Ride Beyond Vengeance, Counterpoint, As the World Turns).
- Bobby Hendricks, 84, American singer (The Drifters), Alzheimer's disease.
- Philip Jeck, 69, English composer.
- Maksym Kagal, 30, Ukrainian kickboxer.
- Milivoj Karakašević, 73, Serbian table tennis player.
- Keith Martin, 55, American R&B singer, heart attack. (body discovered on this date)
- Nguyễn Hữu Việt, 33, Vietnamese Olympic swimmer (2004, 2008), asthma.
- Alan Palmer, 95, British author.
- Cat Pausé, 42, American fat studies academic and activist.
- Yakov Rezantsev, 48, Russian general, air strike.
- Vaʻele Paʻiaʻaua Iona Sekuini, 58, Samoan politician, MP (since 2021), heart attack.
- Mxolisa Sokatsha, 57, South African politician, member of the National Assembly (since 2019), traffic collision.

=== 26 ===
- Ba Dai, 91, Chinese politician, deputy (1964–1988).
- Bang Jun-seok, 51, South Korean composer (Tell Me Something, Bloody Beach, Joint Security Area), music director, and singer-songwriter, stomach cancer.
- Joseph Blenkinsopp, 94, American academic theologian.
- Claudette Bradshaw, 72, Canadian politician, MP (1997–2006) and minister of labour (1998–2004), lung cancer.
- Joseph E. Brooks, 80, American politician.
- James Butler, 90, British sculptor.
- Bethany Campbell, 80, American writer.
- Jeff Carson, 58, American country singer ("Not on Your Love", "The Car", "Holdin' Onto Somethin'"), heart attack.
- Gianni Cavina, 81, Italian actor (The House with Laughing Windows, House of Pleasure for Women, Christmas Present).
- Duan Qing, 68, Chinese philologist.
- George Groombridge, 94, New Zealand politician.
- Peter Gunby, 87, English football player (Bradford City) and manager (Leeds United, Harrogate Town).
- Jesse Hickman, 83, American baseball player (Kansas City Athletics).
- Joan Joyce, 81, American Hall of Fame softball player (Raybestos Brakettes) and coach (Florida Atlantic Owls), and golfer (LPGA Tour).
- Violetta Kolesnikova, 83, Russian animator (The Bremen Town Musicians, Winnie-the-Pooh, The Mystery of the Third Planet).
- Theodore Kryzak, 66, American politician, member of the Maine House of Representatives (since 2018).
- Garry Leach, 67, British comic book artist (Judge Dredd, Tharg's Future Shocks, Dan Dare).
- Tina May, 60, English jazz singer, cancer.
- John K. Menzies, 74, American diplomat, blood clot.
- Aimé Mignot, 89, French football player (Lyon) and manager (Angers, Alès), peritonitis.
- James Moriarty, 85, Irish Roman Catholic prelate, auxiliary bishop of Dublin (1991–2002) and bishop of Kildare and Leighlin (2002–2010).
- Rosalind Morris, 101, Welsh-born American plant geneticist.
- Bennet Murdock, 96, American psychologist.
- Rosa Palomino, 71, Peruvian Aymara indigenous leader, journalist and human rights activist.
- Tom Reynolds, 85, Australian politician, Victorian MLA (1979–1999).
- Mike Riddell, 69, New Zealand Christian minister and writer.
- Joe Williams, 88, American college basketball coach (Florida State Seminoles, Furman Paladins, Jacksonville Dolphins), cancer.
- Teofil Wilski, 86, Polish Roman Catholic prelate, auxiliary bishop of Kalisz (1995–2011).

=== 27 ===
- Lars Bloch, 83, Danish-Italian actor (A Stranger in Town, The Virgo, the Taurus and the Capricorn, Fracchia contro Dracula).
- Titus Buberník, 88, Slovak footballer (ČH Bratislava, LASK Linz, Czechoslovakia national team).
- Garret Cowenhoven, 80, American politician, member of the New Hampshire House of Representatives (1987–1995).
- Jim Dietz, 83, American college baseball player and coach.
- Jaroslav Falta, 71, Czech motocross racer, heart failure.
- Ashton Hawkins, 84, American lawyer and museum board member (Metropolitan Museum of Art, Dia Art Foundation).
- Karl Korte, 93, American composer.
- Rocky King, 64, American professional wrestler and referee (WCW).
- John LaGrone, 77, American football player (Edmonton Eskimos).
- Maurice Langdon, 87, New Zealand cricketer (Northern Districts).
- Lyubomir Milchev-Dandy, 58, Bulgarian journalist, writer, and television personality, beaten.
- Ayaz Mutallibov, 83, Azerbaijani politician, prime minister (1989–1990) and president (1990–1992).
- Valora Noland, 80, American actress (Beach Party, The Passionate Strangers, The War Wagon).
- Enrique Pinti, 82, Argentine actor (Sentimental, Tango, Angel Face) and comedian, complications from diabetes.
- Martin Pope, 103, American physical chemist.
- Oleksandr Rzhavskyy, 63, Ukrainian politician.
- Andur Sahadevan, 70, Indian journalist and film critic.
- Ripunath Seth, 63, Indian politician, Odisha MLA (1995–2000).
- James Vaupel, 76, American scientist.
- Alexandra Zabelina, 85, Russian fencer, Olympic champion (1960, 1968, 1972).

=== 28 ===
- Scott Bennie, 61, Canadian role-playing game designer (Dungeons & Dragons), complications from pneumonia.
- Georges Bou-Jaoudé, 78, Lebanese Maronite Catholic hierarch, archbishop of Tripoli (2005–2020).
- Marvin J. Chomsky, 92, American television director (Roots, The Wild Wild West, Star Trek).
- Raja Izuddin Chulan, 71, Malaysian royal.
- Marion Créhange, 84, French computer scientist.
- Doris Derby, 82, American civil rights activist and photographer, cancer.
- Anita Doherty, 73, Bahamian athlete, educator and philanthropist.
- Naci Erdem, 91, Turkish footballer (Fenerbahçe, Galatasaray, national team) and coach.
- B. B. Gurung, 92, Indian politician, chief minister of Sikkim (1984).
- Dame June Jackson, 82, New Zealand Māori activist and public servant, member of the Parole Board (since 1991).
- Lee Kelly, 89, American sculptor.
- Serhiy Kot, 63, Ukrainian historian.
- Eugene Melnyk, 62, Canadian businessman and philanthropist, owner of the Ottawa Senators (since 2003) and founder of Biovail.
- Richard Moore, 49, Scottish journalist and racing cyclist.
- Antonios Naguib, 87, Egyptian Coptic Catholic cardinal, patriarch of Alexandria (2006–2013).
- Raquel Pankowsky, 69, Mexican actress (My Mexican Shivah, No eres tú, soy yo).
- Helmer Strømbo, 73, Norwegian curler, European champion (1975).
- Mircea Tomuș, 88, Romanian writer and literary historian.
- David Vikøren, 95, Norwegian shipping executive, chief executive of the Norwegian Shipowners' Association (1977–1991).
- Kenneth Walters, 87–88, British mathematician and rheologist.
- Susan Welch, 78, American political scientist.
- Barrie Youngfellow, 75, American actress (It's a Living).

=== 29 ===
- June Shagaloff Alexander, 93, American civil rights activist.
- Paul Benioff, 91, American physicist.
- Harry Beverley, 74, English rugby league player (Workington Town, Fulham RLFC, national team).
- Melanie Clark Pullen, 46, Irish actress (EastEnders) and film producer, breast cancer.
- Joyce Fairbairn, 82, Canadian politician, senator (1984–2013).
- Godfrey Fowler, 90, British physician and academic, Professor of General Practice at the University of Oxford (1996–1997).
- Paul Goodchild, 61, Australian trumpeter, cancer.
- William G. Hamilton, 90, American physician.
- Paul Herman, 76, American actor (The Sopranos, Crazy Heart, The Irishman).
- Charles Jeffrey, 87, British-Russian botanist.
- Irini Konitopoulou-Legaki, 90, Greek singer.
- John Lear, 79, American conspiracy theorist and pilot.
- Kevin Lippert, 63, American book publisher, complications from brain cancer.
- Jun Lopito, 64, Filipino rock guitarist.
- Peter McDonald, 98, Irish Olympic footballer (1948).
- Nancy Milford, 84, American biographer.
- John T. Richardson, 98, American academic and priest, president of DePaul University (1981–1993).
- Rüdiger von Sachsen, 68, German prince, disputed head of the Royal House of Saxony (since 2012).
- Zigmunds Skujiņš, 95, Latvian writer.
- Thomas F. Staley, 86, American author and scholar.
- Miguel Van Damme, 28, Belgian footballer (Cercle Brugge), leukaemia.
- Terry Wallis, 57, American extended coma recoverer.
- Andy Wickham, 74, British record producer.
- Jennifer Wilson, 89, British actress (The Brothers, Coronation Street).
- Kerry-Jayne Wilson, 72, New Zealand biologist.
- Alan Wooler, 68, English football player (Aldershot, FinnPa, Boston Minutemen) and manager.

=== 30 ===
- Charles G. Anderson, 92, American police officer and politician, chief of the Anchorage Police Department (1974–1980), member of the Alaska House of Representatives (1981–1983).
- James Bedingfield, 97, American politician, member of the Oregon House of Representatives (1965–1969).
- Bob Brown, 88, Australian politician, MP (1980–1998), minister for land transport (1988–1993).
- Andrzej Butra, 60, Polish veterinarian and politician.
- Juan Carlos Cárdenas, 76, Argentine footballer (Racing Club, Veracruz, national team).
- Ernie Carroll, 92, Australian puppeteer (Hey Hey It's Saturday, The Daryl and Ossie Show).
- Dolores Castro, 98, Mexican poet, essayist and literary critic.
- Mathew Cheriankunnel, 91, Indian Roman Catholic prelate, bishop of Nalgonda (1976–1986) and Kurnool (1988–1991).
- Martin A. Conway, 69, British psychologist.
- Sir John Craven, 81, English businessman.
- Yanick Étienne, 64, Haitian singer, cancer.
- Egon Franke, 86, Polish fencer, Olympic champion (1964).
- Abdelilah Mohammed Hassan, 88, Iraqi football manager (Al-Quwa Al-Jawiya, Al-Talaba, national team).
- Martin Hochertz, 53, American football player (Washington Redskins, Miami Dolphins).
- Thomas Huffman, 77, American archaeologist.
- David Irvine, 75, Australian diplomat, director general of ASIO (2009–2014) and of ASIS (2003–2009).
- Stephen Keener, 79, American voice actor (The Transformers).
- Roger Laouenan, 89, French writer and historian.
- Fred Markus, 84, Canadian Olympic cyclist (1956).
- Manabu Miyazaki, 76, Japanese writer and social critic.
- Wolf Muser, 75, German actor (Santa Barbara, Alias, The Man in the High Castle).
- Abdul Kahar Othman, 68, Singaporean drug trafficker, execution by hanging.
- Tom Parker, 33, English pop singer (The Wanted), glioblastoma.
- John Peake, 97, British field hockey player, Olympic silver medallist (1948).
- Nancy Ramey, 81, American swimmer, Olympic silver medalist (1956).
- Bill Sylvester, 93, American football player (Butler Bulldogs).
- Sidney Topol, 97, American businessman.
- Willy Vanden Berghen, 82, Belgian racing cyclist, Olympic bronze medallist (1960).
- Nathaniel Ian Wynter, 67, Jamaican musician (Bob Marley and the Wailers), cancer.
- John Zaritsky, 79, Canadian filmmaker (Right to Die?, Just Another Missing Kid, Romeo and Juliet in Sarajevo), Oscar winner (1982).
- Urbano Zea, 80, Mexican Olympic basketball player (1960).

=== 31 ===
- Georgi Atanasov, 88, Bulgarian politician, prime minister (1986–1990).
- Kirori Singh Bainsla, 81, Indian military officer and social activist.
- Jennifer Belcher, 78, American politician, member of the Washington House of Representatives (1983–1993).
- Vladimir Bochkov, 75, Russian politician, senator (2013–2018).
- Rıdvan Bolatlı, 93, Turkish footballer (1952 Olympic team, Ankaragücü, national team).
- John Bruhin, 57, American football player (Tampa Bay Buccaneers).
- Andrzej Bujakiewicz, 82, Polish conductor and teacher.
- Shirley Burkovich, 89, American baseball player (Chicago Colleens, Springfield Sallies, Rockford Peaches).
- Günter Deckert, 82, German political activist.
- Patrick Demarchelier, 78, French fashion photographer.
- Joanne G. Emmons, 88, American politician, member of the Michigan Senate (1991–2002) and House of Representatives (1987–1990).
- Zoltán Friedmanszky, 87, Hungarian football player (Ferencváros) and manager (Matanzas).
- Ángel María Gianola, 95, Uruguayan politician, minister of industry and labour (1960–1963) and the interior (1994–1995).
- Ed Glassgow, 87, American politician.
- Easa Saleh Al Gurg, Emirati businessman and diplomat.
- Richard Howard, 92, American poet, Pulitzer Prize winner (1970).
- Moana Jackson, 76, New Zealand Māori lawyer and academic.
- Joseph Kalichstein, 76, American classical pianist, pancreatic cancer.
- Patricia MacLachlan, 84, American author (Sarah, Plain and Tall, Skylark).
- Franz M. Matschinsky, 90, German-American physician, pharmacologist and biochemist.
- Sven Melander, 74, Swedish journalist (Aftonbladet), television personality (Snacka om nyheter), and actor (Sällskapsresan), esophageal cancer.
- Tullio Moneta, 84, Italian mercenary, co-leader of the 1981 Seychelles coup d'état attempt.
- Graham Nerlich, 92, Australian philosopher.
- Oon Chiew Seng, 106, Singaporean gynaecologist.
- Francesc Pardo i Artigas, 75, Spanish Roman Catholic prelate, bishop of Girona (since 2008).
- Marek Pasionek, 61, Polish lawyer and government official.
- Patricia Poblete, 75, Chilean economist, minister of housing and urbanism (2006–2010).
- Athauda Seneviratne, 90, Sri Lankan politician, MP (1970–1977, 1989–2015).
- Niculae Spiroiu, 85, Romanian engineer, military general and politician, minister of defense (1991–1994).
- Bob Todd, 72, English footballer (Wigan Athletic, Workington, Scarborough).
- Oleksiy Tsybko, 55, Ukrainian rugby player (national team) and politician, mayor of Smila (2015–2018).
- Vasyl Turyanchyk, 86, Ukrainian football player (Dynamo Kyiv, SKVO Lvov) and manager (Karpaty Mukacheve).
- Kei Yamamoto, 81, Japanese actor (The Bullet Train, SP, Hachiko Monogatari), pneumonia.
