= William Camp =

William Camp may refer to:

- William B. Camp, United States comptroller of the currency
- William C. Camp, member of the New Mexico House of Representatives

== See also ==
- William Nelson Camp Jr. House, a historic home in Fairview, Buncombe County, North Carolina
- Bill Camp, American actor
