= Otto Schweizer =

Otto Schweizer may refer to:

- Otto Ernst Schweizer, German architect
- Otto Schweizer (footballer), German footballer
- J. Otto Schweizer, Swiss-American sculptor
