= Listen and Learn =

Listen and Learn may refer to:

== Film and TV ==
- "Listen and Learn", TV advertisement by JUST EAT

== Music ==
- Listen & Learn (Hexstatic album)
- Listen and Learn, a 2001 album by Screaming Orphans

== Educational materials ==
- Listen & Learn (language courses), foreign language courses published by Dover Publications
- Listen and Learn, educational audio and video album by ILAM for Music education in Africa

== See also ==
- "Stop, Listen and Learn", an episode of the Canadian-British children's series Noddy
- Listen, Learn, Read On, a 2002 Deep Purple box set, or the title track
- "Listen and Learn with Phonics", Sally Watson
- "Look, Listen and Learn", Shanghai Foreign Language School
