= David Ash =

David Ash may refer to:

- David Ash (cricketer) (1944–2022), English former cricketer
- David Ash (American football) (born 1992), American football quarterback
- L. David Ash (died 1991), automotive stylist at Ford Motor Company
