= Robert Faricy =

American Jesuit priest and theologian (1926–2022)

Fr. Robert Faricy, S.J. (August 29, 1926 – March 4, 2022) was a Jesuit priest and theologian who was an Emeritus Professor of Spirituality and lived in Milwaukee, Wisconsin. He was an Emeritus Professor of Spirituality at the Pontifical Gregorian University in Rome.

== Work ==
The subjects of Faricy's teaching and writing include theology, philosophy, general spirituality, comparative spirituality, ecotheology, contemplative prayer, spiritual discernment, and the writings of Pierre Teilhard de Chardin, Thomas Aquinas, Thomas Merton, and Flannery O'Connor. He has also written extensively on Marian apparitions, especially at Medjugorje in Bosnia Herzegovina. He has written over thirty books, most of them originally in English and most translated into several languages, as well as several hundred articles in journals, magazines, encyclopedias, and dictionaries of theology and of spirituality.

Faricy has given talks and conducted spiritual retreats in Italy, the United States, Mexico, Ireland, and many other countries, speaking at conferences and conventions and in churches. He has been active in the Catholic Charismatic Renewal, acting as Spiritual Director of the Italian Charismatic Renewal for its first eleven years, and in the renewal of the religious life for Catholic priests, brothers, and sisters. He has been a program innovator and speaker for the Catholic cable television network EWTN and president of Southern California Renewal Communities (SCRC).

Faricy died on March 4, 2022, in Wauwatosa, Wisconsin.

== See also ==
- Society of Jesus

== Books authored ==
- Teilhard de Chardin's Theology of the Christian in the World, 1967
- Praying for Inner Healing, 1979, ISBN 978-0334012887
- The Spirituality of Teilhard de Chardin, Robert Faricy, 1981, ISBN 978-0866836081
- The End of the Religious Life, Robert Faricy, 1983, ISBN 978-0866836906
- Contemplating Jesus, Robert Faricy and R. Wicks, 1986, ISBN 978-0809127573
- The Contemplative Way of Prayer: Deepening Your Life With God, Robert Faricy and Lucy Rooney S. N. D., 1986, ISBN 978-0892833085
- Seeking Jesus in Contemplation and Discernment, Robert L. Faricy and Michael Scanlon, 1987, ISBN 978-0870611421
- The Lord's Dealing: The Primacy of the Feminine in Christian Spirituality, Robert L. Faricy, 1988, ISBN 978-0809130030
- Wind and Sea Obey Him: Approaches to a Theology of Nature, Robert Faricy and Mary E. Jegen, 1988, ISBN 978-0870611599
- A Medjugorje Retreat, Robert L. Faricy and Lucy Rooney, 1989, ISBN 978-0818905582
- Your Wounds I Will Heal, Robert Faricy and Lucy Rooney, 1999, ISBN 978-1878718532
- The Healing of the Religious Life, Robert Faricy and Scholastica Blackborow, 1991, ISBN 978-1-878718-02-0
- Our Lady Comes to Scottsdale: Is It Authentic?, Robert Faricy and Lucy Rooney, 1993 and 2000, ISBN 978-1882972241
- Return to God: The Scottsdale Message, Robert Faricy and Lucy Rooney, 1993, ISBN 978-1882972098
- Knowing Jesus In The World, Robert Faricy and Lucy Rooney, 1996 ISBN 978-1882972661
- Lord Jesus, Teach Me to Pray: A Seven Week Course in Personal Prayer, Robert Faricy and Lucy Rooney, 1997, ISBN 978-1882972555
- Prayer Power: Secrets of Healing and Protection, Janice T. Connell and Robert Faricy, 1998, ISBN 978-0060615222
- Praying With Mary: Contemplating Scripture at Her Side, Robert Faricy and Lucy Rooney, 2002, ISBN 978-0819859372
- Full of Grace: Miraculous Stories of Healing and Conversion Through Mary's Intercession, Christine Watkins and Robert Faricy, 2010, ISBN 978-1594712265
- Praying, Robert Faricy, 2012, ISBN 978-0334012818
