= Sunday O. Fadulu =

Microbiologist and medical researcher

Dr. Sunday O. Fadulu (1940–2022) was a microbiologist and medical researcher, most recognized for his work with sickle cell anemia.

== Early life and education ==
Fadulu was born in Ibadan, Nigeria in 1940, the oldest of eight children. After emigrating to the United States, he graduated from Oklahoma Baptist University in 1964. He received a master's degree and Ph.D. from the University of Oklahoma.

== Career ==
In 1972, Fadulu joined the faculty of Texas Southern University. He was promoted to associate professor in 1978, and became full professor in 1983.

He holds a patent for the treatment of the disease which claimed the lives of two of his brothers in Nigeria. Speaking of his father and the death of his brothers, he has stated, "My father was a man who would never fail. He was so strong," Fadulu said in the chapel service. "The night my brother died, he had my brother in his arms, and I saw his face, and it said that he had failed. I remember the discouragement on his face. I said then that I would find a cure and to do that I would have to go to America."

Fadulu's research used an extract of the African "chewing stick," which he discovered, reverses sickling of red blood cells. The extract also provides protection from the disease. Medication for treating sickle cell anemia has been through the first phases of approval through the Federal Food and Drug Administration.

== Personal life ==
Fadulu was married to his wife Jacqueline in 1968. They had two sons and one daughter. Fadulu died on March 3, 2022.
