= Yuri Vechkasov =

Russian politician (1948–2022)

Member of the Federation Council of Russia
- In office 23 January 1996 – 21 December 2001
- Preceded by: position established
- Succeeded by: Alexander Pashkov
- Constituency: Penza Oblast

Chairman of the Legislative Assembly of Penza Oblast
- In office 11 February 1994 – 14 April 2002
- Preceded by: position established
- Succeeded by: Viktor Lazutkin

Personal details
- Born: Yuri Ivanovich Vechkasov; 6 June 1948 Novoye Demkino, Penza Oblast, Russian SFSR, Soviet Union
- Died: 17 March 2022 (aged 73) Penza, Russia
- Education: Penza State Agricultural Academy

Yuri Ivanovich Vechkasov (Russian: Ю́рий Ива́нович Вечка́сов; 6 June 1948 – 17 March 2022) was a Russian politician. He served in the Federation Council from 1996 to 2001. He died in Penza on 17 March 2022, at the age of 73.
