= Ed Ochiena =

Retired Canadian football player (1938–2022)

Profile
- Positions: Halfback, End

Personal information
- Born: January 26, 1938; Toronto, Ontario
- Died: March 4, 2022 (aged 84); Collingwood, Ontario
- Listed height: 6 ft 2 in (1.88 m)
- Listed weight: 184 lb (83 kg)

Career history
- 1959–1961: Toronto Argonauts
- 1962: Hamilton Tiger Cats

Edward Alexander Ochiena (January 26, 1938 – March 4, 2022) was a Canadian professional football player who played for the Toronto Argonauts and Hamilton Tiger Cats.

He died on March 4, 2022.
