= Gladys Moisés =

Argentine politician (1961–2022)

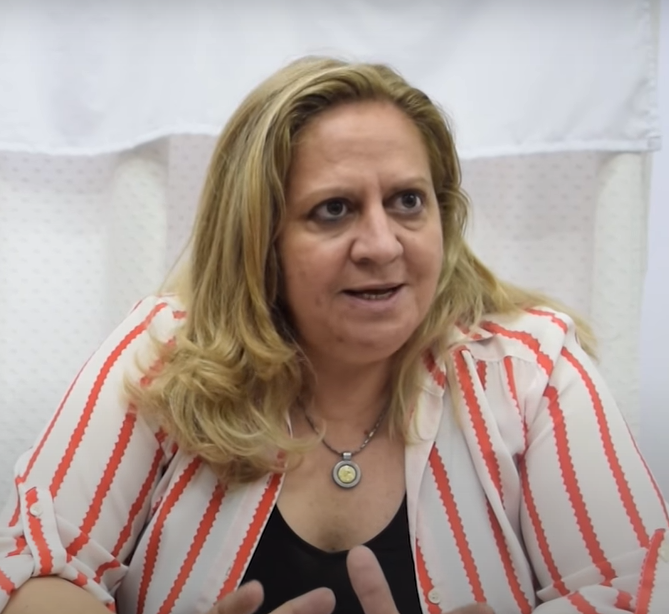
- Moisés in 2017

Member of the Cámara de Diputados de la Provincia de Salta
- In office 24 November 2017 – 23 November 2021
- Constituency: Metán Department

Executive Director of PAMI in Salta Province
- In office 20 January 2016 – 30 August 2017
- Preceded by: Herman Spollansky
- Succeeded by: Nicolás Sivila

Personal details
- Born: Gladys Rosa Moisés; 10 September 1961 San José de Metán, Argentina
- Died: 5 March 2022 (aged 60) San José de Metán, Argentina
- Party: PRO
- Education: National University of Tucumán

Gladys Rosa Moisés (10 September 1961 – 5 March 2022) was an Argentine politician. A member of the Republican Proposal, she served in the Cámara de Diputados de la Provincia de Salta from 2017 to 2021 and was Executive Director of PAMI in the Salta Province from 2016 to 2017. She died of cancer in San José de Metán on 5 March 2022, at the age of 60.
