= Olivier Cousi =

French lawyer (1959–2022)

Bâtonnier of the Paris Bar Association
- In office 1 January 2020 – 2 March 2022
- Preceded by: Marie-Aimée Peyron

President of the Alliance des Avocats pour les Droits de l’Homme
- In office July 2015 – 2 March 2022

Secretary of the Conférence des avocats du barreau de Paris
- In office 1 January 1988 – 31 December 1988

Personal details
- Born: 2 June 1959 9th arrondissement of Paris, France
- Died: 2 March 2022 (aged 62) France
- Education: Lycée Carnot; Paris 2 Panthéon-Assas University; French Press Institute; Sciences Po
- Occupation: Lawyer

Olivier Cousi (French: [ɔlivje kuzi]; 2 June 1959 – 2 March 2022) was a French lawyer.

== Biography ==
Cousi was born into a family who had lived in Eure-et-Loire and was the son of lawyer Pierre Cousi. He received a baccalauréat from the Lycée Carnot in 1976, graduated from the French Press Institute in 1980, and earned a law degree from Sciences Po in 1983. He also earned a Master of Advanced Studies under the regulation of the French independent administrative authority from Paris 2 Panthéon-Assas University in 1983. He became a licensed lawyer in 1985 and joined the international law firm Gide Loyrette Nouel.

Cousi served as secretary of the Conférence des avocats du barreau de Paris in 1988 under the leadership of Philippe Lafarge. He became President of the Alliance des Avocats pour les Droits de l’Homme in July 2015. After being defeated in the 2016 ordinal elections, he was elected 221st Bâtonnier of the Paris Bar Association in 2018. He took office on 1 January 2020 alongside his Vice-Bâtonnier, Nathalie Roret. During his campaign, he publicly sought to "restore a political role" to the Paris Bar.

Cousi died following a long illness on 2 March 2022, at the age of 62.
