= Ivan Dikunov =

Russian sculptor (1941–2022)

- Born: Ivan Pavlovich Dikunov; 14 April 1941; Pavlovsky District, Voronezh Oblast, Russian SFSR, Soviet Union
- Died: 25 March 2022 (aged 80)
- Occupation: Sculptor

Ivan Pavlovich Dikunov (14 April 1941 – 25 March 2022) was a Russian sculptor.

== Biography ==
Dikunov was born in Pavlovsky District, Voronezh Oblast. He graduated from his high school in 1958. He studied sculpture at Tavricheskaya Art School, later attending the St. Petersburg Academy of Arts from 1964 to 1970. he also attended Leningrad Art College. Dikunov became a member of the Artists' Union of the USSR in 1974.

Dikunov taught at the Voronezh Art School from 1988 to 1995. He then taught at the Voronezh State University and was chairperson of the Artists' Union of the USSR from 1985 to 1991. He was awarded medals such as Honored Artist of the RSFSR and the People's Artist of the Russian Federation. Dikunov was made an Honorary Citizen of the Voronezh Region by the Governor of Voronezh Oblast on 9 June 2009. He was also a member of the Petrovsky Academy of Science and Arts.

Dikunov died from complications of COVID-19 in March 2022, at the age of 80.
