= Debra Majeed =

American religious historian (1954–2022)

- Born: January 7, 1954
- Died: March 20, 2022 (aged 68); Charlotte, North Carolina
- Occupation: Islamic scholar
- Employer(s): Beloit College; Loyola University Chicago
- Known for: Muslim womanist thought
- Notable work: Polygyny: What It Means When African American Muslim Women Share Their Husbands

Debra Mubashshir Majeed (January 7, 1954 – March 20, 2022) was an American religious historian, activist and womanist.

== Early life ==
Debra Majeed was born in 1954 to an African-American Catholic family, but later became a Protestant. At 16, her family moved to Los Angeles.

She earned her B.A. from Pepperdine University in journalism, but found it difficult to find a job, opting to work in commercial businesses.

At the time, Majeed was a conservative Christian and worked in a church. She met two men questioning their sexuality who inspired her to enroll in an M.A. program in theology at Fuller Evangelical Theological Seminary in Pasadena, California. She felt a calling to ministry and also earned her M. Div. Majeed became a minister in the United Methodist Church. In Pasadena, she served as a minister at Scott United Methodist Church.

== Career ==
She converted to Islam in 1998 at age 42 while studying the appeal of Islam to Black American men in Chicago in a joint doctoral program with Northwestern University and Garrett-Evangelical Seminary.

She briefly taught American religion at Loyola University Chicago. In 1999, Majeed took a position teaching philosophy and religious studies at Beloit College in Beloit, Wisconsin.

Majeed was the first Black woman and first Muslim to be tenured in the history of the college. She held the title of Edwin F. Wilde Jr. Distinguished Service Professor. She retired from teaching in 2020 and became Beloit's first Black and Muslim professor to achieve Emeritus status.

Majeed is best known for her 2016 work, Polygyny: What It Means When African American Muslim Women Share Their Husbands, an ethnography studying Muslim followers of W.D. Muhammad. Her book approaches polygyny from a Muslim womanist perspective. Majeed advocated for and invented the term "Muslim womanism", a recognition of what it means to be simultaneously Black, Muslim, and a woman. Majeed was critical of the centering of Christian women and perspectives in womanist thought. Her work dealt with issues of race, marriage and family life, gender, and family law.

The Professor Debra Majeed Honors Scholarship was established in her honor for racial minority students in the University of Wisconsin-Milwaukee Honors College.

== Activism ==
Majeed was an activist for women's rights, particularly in the context of marriage and the family, regardless of family structure. She founded Queen City Family Advocates, that deals with familial well-being. Majeed was a certified Guardian ad Litem for abused children.

== Death ==
Majeed died from complications due to surgery on March 20, 2022, in Charlotte, North Carolina. She was 68 years old.

== Works ==
=== Articles ===
- "THE BATTLE HAS BEEN JOINED": Gay and Polygynous Marriages Are Out of the Closet and in Search of Legitimacy in CrossCurrents, Vol. 54, No. 2 (Summer 2004), pp. 73–81
- "Khalidah's Story: An African American Muslim Women's Journey to Freedom"

=== Books ===
- Polygyny: What It Means When African American Muslim Women Share Their Husbands. Gainesville: University Press of Florida, 2016. ISBN 0-8130-5406-0

=== Chapters ===
- "Sexual Identity, Marriage, and Family" in The Cambridge Companion to American Islam
- "Womanism encounters Islam: a Muslim Scholar Considers the Efficacy of a Method Rooted in the Academy and the Church" in Deeper Shades of Purple: Womanism in Religion and Society
- "We Can Be Our Own Survivors:" African American Muslim Women on Love, Loss, and Life Following the Death of a Spouse" in Tying the Knot: a Feminist/Womanist guide to Muslim marriage in America
- "Muslim Marriage: A Womanist Perspective on Troubling U.S. Traditions" in Ain't I a Womanist, too?: Third-Wave Womanist Religious Thought
- "Ethics of Sisterhood: African American Muslim Women and Polygyny" in The Polygamy Question
- "Resisting the Veil of Universalism: Muslim Womanist Philosophy as a Lens for Authentic Representations of African American Muslim Women" in Muslima Theology: The Voices of Muslim Women Theologians
- “Afterword” from Polygyny: What It Means When African American Muslim Women Share Their Husbands, in Half of Faith: American Muslim Marriage and Divorce in the Twenty-First Century
- "Polygyny and the Performance of Gendered Power among African American Muslims" in New Horizons of Muslim Diaspora in North America and Europe
