= Bill Miller (North Carolina politician) =

American politician (1929–2022)

William Benjamin Miller Sr.
- Born: September 15, 1929
- Died: March 14, 2022 (aged 92)
- Occupations: Politician and businessman
- Website

William Benjamin Miller Sr. (September 15, 1929 – March 14, 2022) was an American politician and businessman.

Miller worked in sales and sales management. He served as chairman of the Forsyth County Republican Party. In 2006, he served in the North Carolina Senate. Miller died from complications of pneumonia on March 14, 2022, at the age of 92.
