= Heinz Wassermann =

German footballer (1939–2022)

Personal information
- Date of birth: 26 June 1939
- Place of birth: Oberhausen, Rhineland, Prussia, Germany
- Date of death: 3 March 2022 (aged 82)
- Place of death: Mainz, Rhineland-Palatinate, Germany
- Position: Left back

Senior career*
Years	Team	Apps	(Gls)
1960–1964	Rot-Weiss Essen		
1964–1970	Mainz 05	180	(15)
1970–1971	VfR Groß-Gerau		
- * Club domestic league appearances and goals

Heinz Wassermann (26 June 1939 – 3 March 2022) was a German footballer who played as a left back.

== Career ==
Born in Oberhausen, Wassermann moved from Rot-Weiss Essen to Mainz 05 in 1964, staying with the club until 1970 and making 200 competitive appearances for the club, scoring 18 goals. He then spent a year with VfR Groß-Gerau.

== Personal life ==
Wassermann died in Mainz, Rhineland-Palatinate on 3 March 2022, at the age of 82.
