= Felton Ross =

British-American physician(1927–2022)

Dr. Felton Ross
- Born: William Felton Ross; May 9, 1927; Leominster, England
- Died: March 3, 2022 (aged 94); Goshen, Indiana
- Education: London Hospital Medical College (1954)
- Occupations: Physician, christian missionary
- Spouse: Una Dickinson (m. 1959)
- Children: 5
- Medical career
- Research: Leprosy research

William Felton Ross (May 9, 1927 – March 3, 2022), known as Felton Ross, was a British–American physician and medical missionary who served as the medical director of the American Leprosy Missions.

== Early life ==
Ross was born in Leominster, England in 1927. He had his education at Lucton School and Lancing College. Following two years of service in the Royal Army Service Corps, Ross gained a medical degree (MB.B.S.) from The London Hospital Medical College in 1954.

== Career ==
Ross' leprosy work began in 1957 when he joined the British Colonial Office as a medical officer and received leprosy training in Nigeria. He received training in leprosy surgery during a 12-month World Health Organization fellowship in India in 1960. From 1961 until 1966, he was the area superintendent for Nigeria's leprosy program. In 1966, the American Leprosy Missions (ALM) appointed Ross as director of training at the All-Africa Leprosy Education and Rehabilitation Training Center (ALERT) in Addis Ababa. Ross moved to the United States and served as the medical director of ALM from 1976 until 1997 and continued as a medical advisor and board member for several more years. Ross also worked in Paraguay, Morocco, Nigeria, India, Brazil and many other locations.

== Personal life ==
Ross married Una Dickinson, a former missionary nurse, in May 1959. Together they had five children. Ross died in 2022 in Goshen, Indiana.
