= Laurent Vimont =

French businessman (1961–2022)

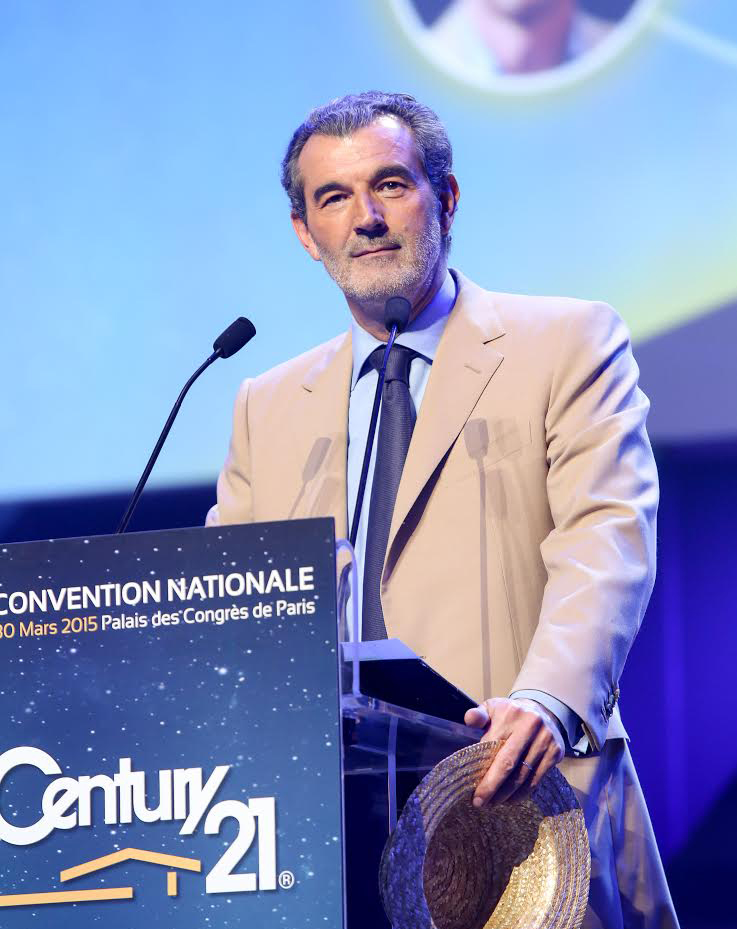
- Vimont in 2015
- Born: Jean-Charles Laurent Vimont; 7 February 1961; Montreuil, France
- Died: 11 March 2022 (aged 61); France
- Occupation: Businessman

Jean-Charles Laurent Vimont (7 February 1961 – 11 March 2022) was a French businessman. He had served as president of the French subsidiary of Century 21 Real Estate, a branch of Realogy.

== Biography ==
Vimont began his career in real estate in 1984 as an advisor for Cerim-immobilier in Melun, where he worked until 1987. That year, the Century 21 network was established in France, for which he became responsible for franchise marketing. In 1989, he took charge of network organization, leading developers within the company. In 2001, he became chairman of Naxos, the information technology subsidiary of Century 21.

In 2006, Century 21 France was purchased by Nexity. Its CEO, Alain Dinin, appointed Vimont President of Century 21 France in 2009. After his appointment, he continued working alongside his predecessor, Hervé Bléry.

Following a vacation in Miami, Vimont suffered a heart attack and died on 11 March 2022, at the age of 61.

== Decorations ==
- Knight of the National Order of Merit (2011)
- Knight of the National Order of the Legion of Honour (2019)
