= Dr Cann =

Ghanaian broadcaster (died 2022)

- Also known as: Dr Cann
- Born: Francis Ebo Cann; Ghana
- Origin: Ghana
- Died: 25 March 2022
- Genres: Highlife, Hip hop, Afro-pop, R&B and Afrobeat
- Occupation: Broadcaster
- Instrument: Turntables

Francis Ebo Cann also known us Dr Cann was a Ghanaian broadcaster.

== Career ==
He worked for radio stations like GBC Radio in Accra, Radio Winaby in Cape Coast and Sunrise FM in Koforidua. He finally joined Happy FM where he was the host of Showbiz Extra and Ayeeko Ayeeko an entertainment show.

== Death ==
He had a short illness that led to his death.
