= Charles Mansolillo =

American lawyer and politician (1949–2022)

Charles R. Mansolillo (March 8, 1949 – March 7, 2022) was an American lawyer and politician.

Mansolillo was born in Providence, Rhode Island. He graduated from Classical High School in 1967 and from Saint Michael's College in 1971. He graduated from Suffolk University Law School and was admitted to the Rhode Island bar. He served in the Rhode Island House of Representatives in 1973 and 1974. Mansolillo died on March 7, 2022, one day before his 73rd birthday.
