= Edwin Zarowin =

American track and field coach (1926–2022)

Biographical details
- Born: June 12, 1926
- Died: March 9, 2022 (aged 95)
- Education: New York University

Coaching career (HC unless noted)
- 1962 -1984: Brooklyn Tech
- 1985 - 2015: Hunter College

Accomplishments and honors

Awards
- Hunter College Hall of Fame (1996)

Edwin Zarowin was a former track and field coach for Hunter College and Brooklyn Tech. Zarowin won the CUNYAC Coach of the Year 33 times during his tenure. He passed on March 9, 2022.

== Early life ==
Zarowin was a World War II Veteran prior to going to NYU where he earned a BA in Education. While at NYU, he played football and wrestled.

== Brooklyn Tech ==
Zarowin worked at Brooklyn Tech, where he also took on the additional duty as a track coach for 21 years. He additionally worked as an AP Health and Physical Education Teacher. He started coaching track in 1962. He retired from Brooklyn Tech after 33 years. He stepped down from Brooklyn Tech Track the winner of the outdoor city championships.

== Hunter College ==
Zarowin coached Track and Field as well as Cross Country at Hunter College. While there he coached 3 National Champions, 23 All Americans, 33 Coach of the Year and was elected to the Hunter College Hall of Fame in 1996. Zarowin won 15 Men's Outdoor Titles, and 3 Women's Outdoor titles. This was a part of his combined 45 titles for the Hunter Hawks. In 2015, at the age of 88, Zarowin was offered an archivist position in lieu of coaching. This was a take it or leave it approach. To which he stated, ""If this is the only option open to me, you will -- in essence -- have fired me."" He filed an EEO complaint for age discrimination against Hunter College.

== Mentions ==
Zarowin was mentioned in the book, The Truth About Your Future concerning never getting old.
