= José Ricardo Díaz Pardeiro =

Galician writer and historian (1944–2022)

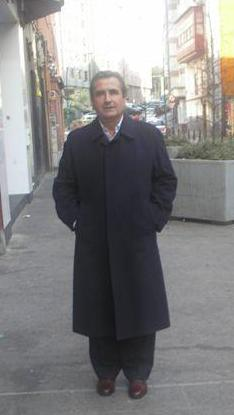
José Ricardo Díaz Pardeiro

José Ricardo Díaz Pardeiro, (19 November 1944 – 7 March 2022) born in Ferreira do Valadouro, Lugo, Spain, was a Galician writer and historian, writing about the city of A Coruña, in Galicia, Spain. He died on 7 March 2022, at the age of 77.

== Bibliography ==
=== Books ===
- La vida cultural en la Coruña: El Teatro, 1882-1915
- Crónicas coruñesas
- Miscelánea coruñesa
