= Yves Michalon =

French writer (1945–2022)

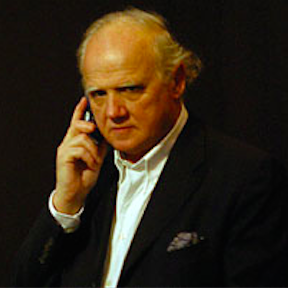
- Born: 7 January 1945; Paris, France
- Died: 9 March 2022 (aged 77); France
- Occupations: Communicator, writer and publisher
- Awards: Paul Flat Prize (1980)

Yves Michalon (7 January 1945 – 9 March 2022) was a French communicator, writer and publisher. After 20 years in communication (1974 creation of the MBC agency which became Bélier Rive Gauche in 1986, vice-president of EuroRSCG France in 1992), he created the association Est Libertés in 1990, whose main aim was to support efforts to democratize Eastern Europe and support democratic political parties in Albania, Bulgaria, Romania and Serbia (development of programs with the European Union, in interface with the French political parties, etc.).

== Éditions Michalon ==
In late 1994, Michalon established Éditions Michalon in Paris which published books, essays, and papers on non-fiction topics but entered receivership in April 2008. Through its subsidiaries CDE and Sodis, Gallimard had held an 18% stake in Michalon but did not continue with a bailout of Éditions Michalon. On 16 November 2009, Jean-Charles Gérard's Max Milo obtained Éditions Michalon through receivership retaining Yves Michalon as its editor, then on 30 October 2012, L'Harmattan purchased Éditions Michalon but retained Yves Michalon as editor at his eponymous publishing house YME (Yves Michalon Editions) until 18 June 2020 when Michalon left.

== Defamation by Corinne Maier ==
In 2012, Corinne Maier was found guilty in French court of defamation against Yves Michalon receiving a €1000 suspended fine and was ordered to pay Michalon €1 in damages and €3000 for his legal fees.

== Personal life ==
Michalon died on 9 March 2022, at the age of 77.

== Publications ==
- 1979: Le pousse-caillou, Éditions Robert Laffont
- 1981: La Passion selon St Just, Albin Michel
- 1984: Des lézards et des hommes, Albin Michel
- 1988: Les heures supplémentaires, Albin Michel
- 1992: Boulevard de l'absolu, Albin Michel
