= John Michael Małek =

Polish-American engineer (1928–2022)

- Jan Michał Małek
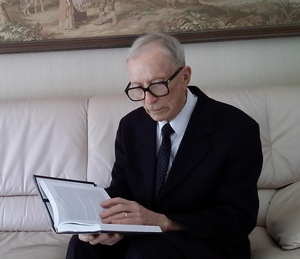
- Born: 18 May 1928; Piotrków Trybunalski, Poland
- Died: 19 March 2022 (aged 93); United States
- Occupations: engineer, entrepreneur, real estate investor, developer, founder of Polish-American Foundation for Economic Research and Education (PAFERE), Polonia Institute, The Mackiewicz Prize

John Michael Małek (18 May 1928 – 19 March 2022) was a Polish-American engineer, entrepreneur, real estate investor and developer, economics enthusiast, and activist and philanthropist.

== Early life ==
Małek was born in Piotrków Trybunalski, Poland. He received a master's degree in chemical engineering from Warsaw University of Technology (Politechnika Warszawska) and subsequently worked in the pharmaceutical industry. In 1958, unable to tolerate Poland's Soviet-imposed communist system which squelched political and economic freedom and private enterprise, he succeeded in leaving Poland for France where he was granted political asylum in Paris and worked as an engineer for 8 years.

Małek arrived in the United States in the summer of 1967 and worked for 10 years at two successive engineering companies as a chemical process engineer. During his time as an engineer and inventor, Małek obtained several US patents for his innovations in the field of coal liquefaction. After several years of engineering and consultation practice, he began to divide his time and endeavors between real estate investments & development and philanthropic activities – areas in which he was continuously active until his death.

== Public Activity and Accomplishments ==
Despite emigrating from Poland, Małek continued to care deeply for his fatherland. He became an active member of various Polish-American organizations, including the Polish American Congress and the North American Study Center for Polish Affairs (STUDIUM), an organization composed largely of American and Canadian university professors of Polish origin. After the introduction of martial law in Poland in 1981, Małek also became very involved in the anti-Yalta movement and in the Pomost organization, whose main purpose was to serve as a bridge between American Polonia and the Solidarity movement in Poland.

After the fall of communism in Poland, Małek became involved in promoting economic education with the goal of familiarizing Poles with the principles of the free market economy including the mechanisms of national wealth creation. In the early 1990s, he translated from English into Polish the book Anti-Capitalistic Mentality written by the economist and propagator of the free market Ludwig von Mises. He also contributed financially or as translator to the publication of other important free market books in Poland, including Mises’ Human Action, Hernando de Soto’s The Mystery of Capital: Why Capitalism Triumphs in the West and Fails Everywhere Else, and the anthology Clichés of Politics. This undertaking eventually led Małek to found the Polish-American Foundation for Economic Research and Education (PAFERE) in the year 2000 and its Polish counterpart – PAFERE Polska – in 2007. The guiding philosophy of PAFERE is that the injunction “Thou Shalt not Steal!” is the most important imperative for the economy. Compliance with this injunction, by both governments and citizens, is a prerequisite for optimal economic development and prosperity.

John Michael Małek was a member of the prestigious Mont Pelerin Society, whose membership includes over 500 economists from around the world, including at least six Nobel Prize winners.

Along with Zbigniew Zarywski, a Polish entrepreneur, Małek established a literary prize named in honor of Polish writer Józef Mackiewicz The Mackiewicz Prize that has been awarded every year since 2002 at a special ceremony at the Literary Institute in Warsaw on Polish Independence Day, 11 November.

In 2015, Małek co-founded Polonia Institute, a tax-exempt organization in the United States, whose mission is to protect the reputation of Poland, Poles, and Polonia in the United States and around the world, as well as to advocate for Poland's and Polonia's aspirations via education, research, analysis, advocacy, and legal solutions.

On 22 November 2016, John Michael Małek was awarded the Commander's Cross of Polonia Restituta for lifetime achievements in furthering the good of Polonia and Poland by the President of the Polish Republic.

== Private life ==
Małek was married to Krystyna and had one daughter and two grandchildren.
