= Jürgen W. Heike =

German politician (1949–2022)

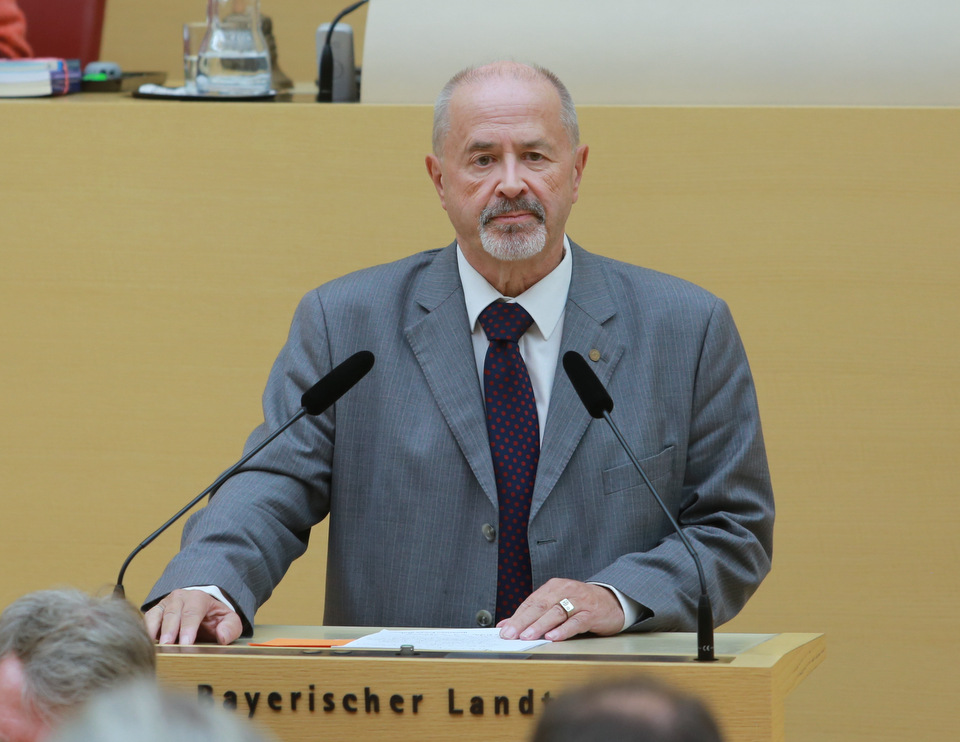
- Heike in 2017

Member of the Landtag of Bavaria
- In office 20 October 1994 – 5 November 2018

Personal details
- Born: March 9, 1949 Neustadt bei Coburg, Allied-occupied Germany
- Died: 15 March 2022 (aged 73) Neustadt bei Coburg, Bavaria, Germany
- Party: CSU
- Education: University of Erlangen–Nuremberg

Jürgen W. Heike (9 March 1949 – 15 March 2022) was a German politician. A member of the Christian Social Union in Bavaria, he served in the Landtag of Bavaria from 1994 to 2018. He died in Neustadt bei Coburg on 15 March 2022, at the age of 73.
