= William G. Hamilton =

American physician (1932–2022)

- Born: William Garnet Hamilton; January 11, 1932; Altus, Oklahoma, U.S.
- Died: March 29, 2022 (aged 90); Croton-on-Hudson, New York, U.S.
- Education: Princeton University; Columbia University Vagelos College of Physicians and Surgeons
- Occupation: Physician
- Spouse: Linda Homek
- Children: 2

William Garnet Hamilton (January 11, 1932 – March 29, 2022) was an American physician.

== Life and career ==
Hamilton was born in Altus, Oklahoma, the son of Elizabeth (Garnett) Hamilton, a homemaker and Milton Hamilton, a salesman. He and his family moved to Shreveport, Louisiana. His parents later became divorced. Hamilton's mother remarried and they moved to Portage, Wisconsin. Hamilton attended Princeton University, where he earned a degree in engineering in 1954. He served in the United States Army.

He later applied to medical school. Hamilton was accepted at Columbia University Vagelos College of Physicians and Surgeons where he studied orthopedic surgery. He graduated in 1964, and established his own practice in Manhattan, New York in 1969.

Hamilton worked as a physician specializing in orthopedic surgery for New York City Ballet and American Ballet Theatre. He also worked as a sports physician and with performers in Broadway shows.

Hamilton died in March 2022 of heart failure at his home in Croton-on-Hudson, New York, at the age of 90.
