= Miguel Grinberg =

Argentine writer, poet, and journalist (1937–2022)

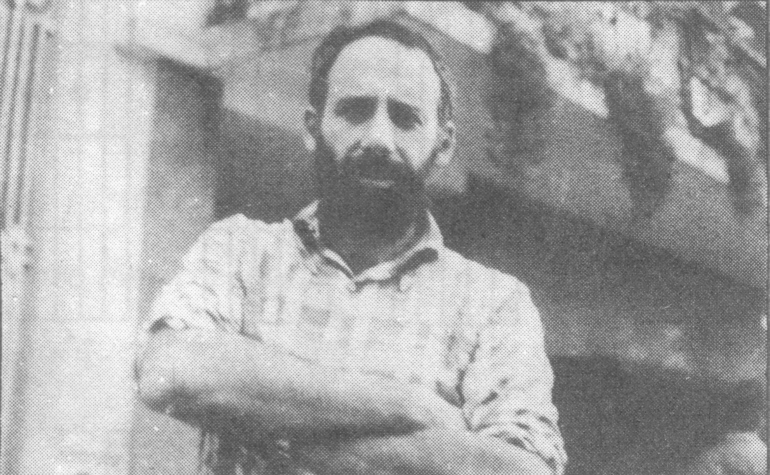
Miguel Grinberg in 1983

Miguel Grinberg (18 August 1937 – 4 March 2022) was an Argentine writer, translator, poet, and journalist. He died on 4 March 2022, at the age of 84.
