= Willy Buer =

Norwegian footballer (1928–2022)

Personal information
- Date of birth: 8 June 1928
- Date of death: 4 March 2022 (aged 93)
- Position: Forward

Senior career*
Years	Team	Apps	(Gls)
1951–1954	IF Odd		
1954	Lyn Fotball		

International career
1950	Norway B	1	(0)
1954	Norway	1	(0)
- * Club domestic league appearances and goals

Willy Buer (8 June 1928 – 4 March 2022) was a Norwegian footballer who played as a forward. He made one appearance for the Norway national team in 1954.
