= Arnaldo Rosa Prata =

Brazilian farmer and politician (1927–2022)

Mayor of Uberaba
- In office 1971–1973
- Preceded by: Randolfo Borges Júnior
- Succeeded by: Hugo Rodrigues da Cunha

Personal details
- Born: 10 April 1927; Uberaba, Brazil
- Died: 20 March 2022 (aged 94); Uberaba, Brazil
- Political party: ARENA; PMDB
- Occupation: Farmer

Arnaldo Rosa Prata (10 April 1927 – 20 March 2022) was a Brazilian politician. A member of the National Renewal Alliance, he served as mayor of Uberaba from 1971 to 1973.

Rosa Prata died in Uberaba on 20 March 2022 at the age of 94.
