= Martha Vonk-van Kalker =

Dutch politician (1943–2022)

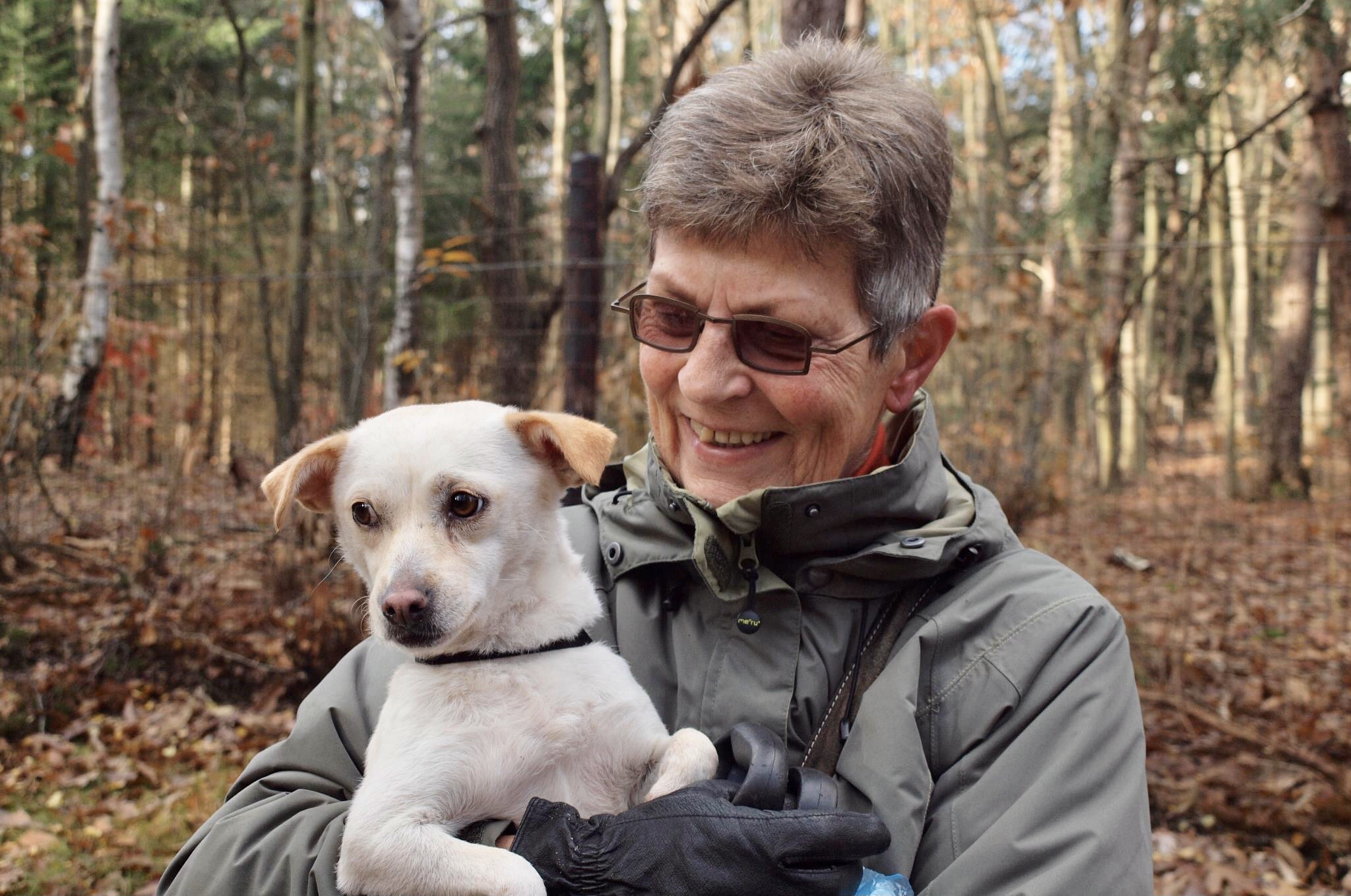

Member of the Senate of the Netherlands
- In office 1977–1981

Personal details
- Born: Martha Catharina Annie Vonk-van Kalker; 23 September 1943 Groningen, Netherlands
- Died: 11 March 2022 (aged 78) Zoetermeer, Netherlands
- Party: PvdA

Martha Catharina Annie Vonk-van Kalker (23 September 1943 – 11 March 2022) was a Dutch politician. A member of the Labour Party, she served in the Senate from 1977 to 1981. She died in Zoetermeer on 11 March 2022, at the age of 78.
