= Dennis Cunningham =

American civil rights lawyer (1936–2022)

Dennis Dickson Cunningham (January 2, 1936 – March 5, 2022) was an American civil rights lawyer. He was a founder of the People’s Law Office. After the killings of Fred Hampton and Mark Clark, he successfully sued the United States government on behalf of the Black Panthers. In 1982, the case was settled for $1.85 million.
