= Garret Cowenhoven =

American politician (1941–2022)

Garret Peter Cowenhoven VI (1941 – March 27, 2022) was an American politician

Cowenhoven was born in Brooklyn, in New York City, New York and grew up in Greens Farms, Connecticut. He graduated from Worcester Academy. Cowenhoven joined the United States Army. He went to University of California, Berkeley and to American University. In 1976, Cowenhoven moved to Amherst, New Hampshire. He served on the Amherst Board of Selectman and then in the New Hampshire House of Representatives from 1987 to 1995. Cowenhoven died in Concord, New Hampshire.
