= Alan J. Faller =

American meteorologist (1929–2022)

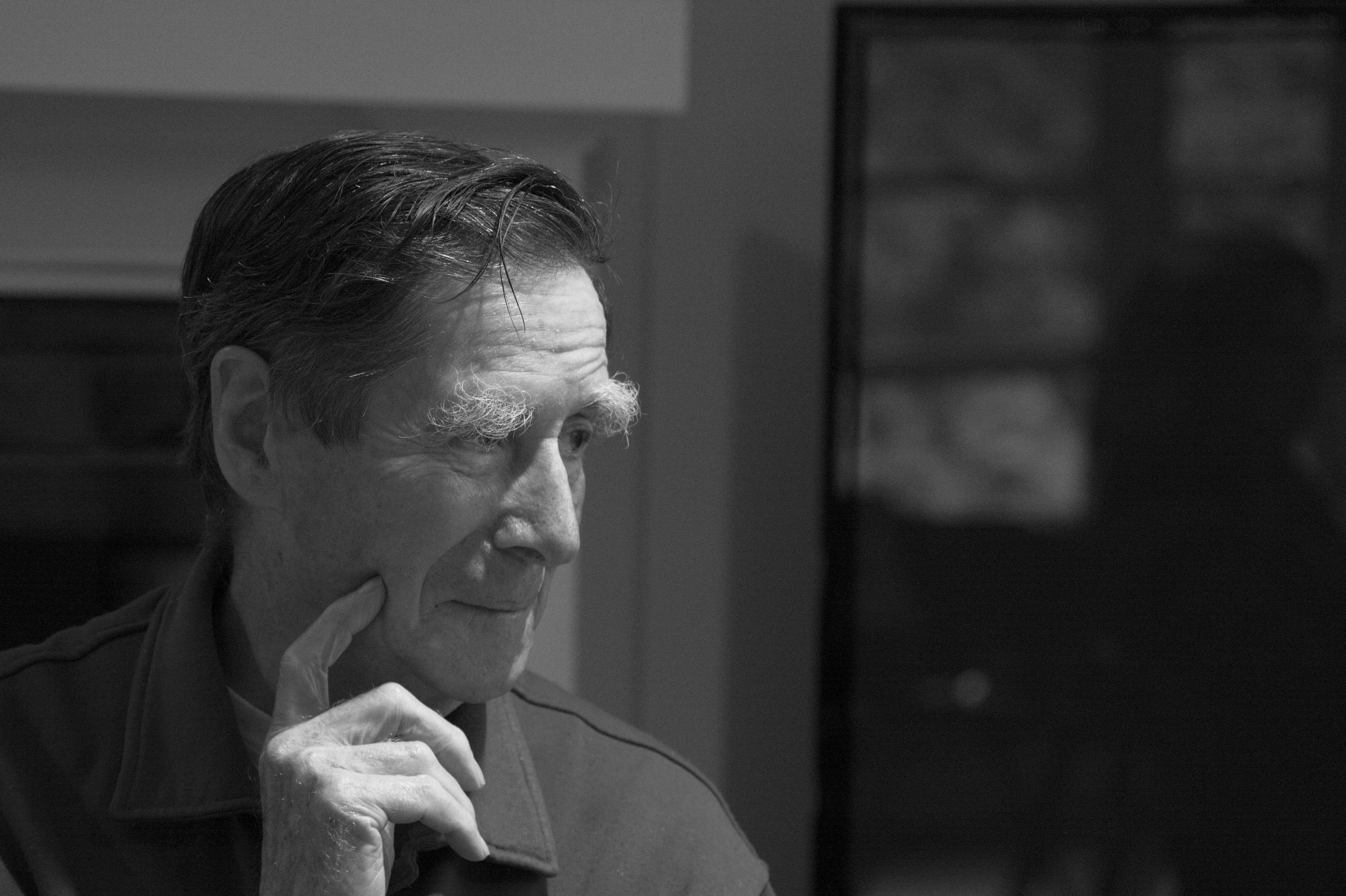
- Faller in 2013
- Born: Alan Judson Faller; March 4, 1929; Roslindale, Massachusetts, U.S.
- Died: March 12, 2022 (aged 93); Melrose, Massachusetts
- Education: MIT (B.S., 1951; M.Sc., 1953, Sc.D. 1957 - Atmospheric Sciences)
- Known for: Small oceanic and atmospheric circulation research
- Awards: Guggenheim Fellowship
- Scientific career
- Fields: Meteorology, oceanography

Alan Judson Faller (March 4, 1929 – March 12, 2022) was an American meteorologist and oceanographer specializing in small oceanic and atmospheric circulation. He was the son of the Olympic runner Fred Faller.

== Career ==
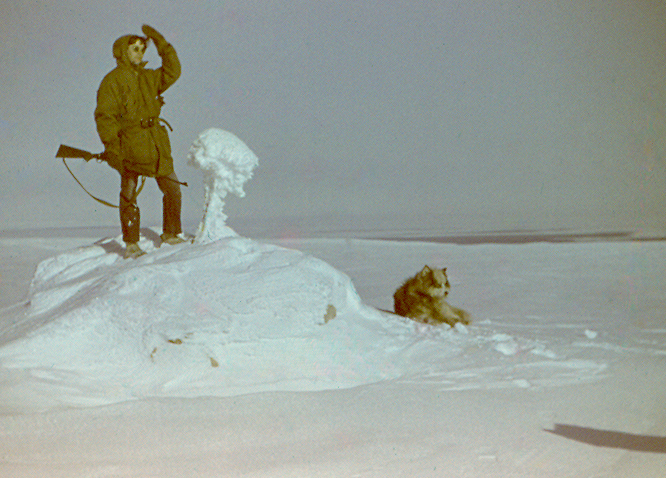
Alan Faller at the cairn on Griffith Island near Resolute Bay

In 1949, Faller took a one-year sabbatical from his studies at MIT to spend a year in the arctic (at the Resolute Bay weather station) collecting atmospheric data with weather balloons. While there, he and an associate discovered a cairn on Griffith Island, marking what appeared to be a grave. As a result of Faller's notice to a Canadian archeologist, it was later discovered through research that this was the grave of an officer on HMS Resolute, buried there in 1850 during the Resolute's first search for Sir John Franklin and pursuit of the Passage.

After returning to MIT and completing his Sc.D., Faller was a researcher at WHOI from 1954 to 1963. From 1963 to 1989 he was a professor at the University of Maryland in the Institute of Fluid Dynamics and Applied Mathematics. His research was critical in the understanding of Langmuir circulations. and two instabilities of Ekman boundary layers.

== Selected writings ==
Some of Alan J. Faller's publications include:

- Faller, Alan (1956). "Atmospheric Model Studies". Oceanus. IV: 2–11.
- Faller, Alan (1959). "Further examples of stationary planetary flow patterns in bounded basins". Tellus. XII (2): 159–170. doi:10.3402/tellusa.v12i2.9380.
- Faller, Alan (1961). An Experimental Analogy to and Proposed Explanation of Hurricane Spiral Bans (PDF). 2nd Technical Conference on Hurricanes. Miami Beach, FL.
- Faller, Alan (1963). "An Experimental Study of the Instability of the Laminar Ekman Boundary Layer". Journal of Fluid Mechanics. 15 (4): 560–576. doi:10.1017/s0022112063000458.
- Faller, Alan (1964). "The angle of windrows in the ocean". Tellus. XVI (3): 363–370. doi:10.3402/tellusa.v16i3.8932.
- Faller, Alan; Kaylor, R.E. (1966). "A numerical study of the instability of the laminar Ekman boundary layer". J. Atmos. Sci. 23 (5): 466–480. doi:10.1175/1520-0469(1966)023<0466:ansoti>2.0.co;2.
- Faller, Alan; Kaylor, R.E. (1969). "Oscillatory and transitory Eckman boundary layer". Deep-Sea Res. 16: 45–58.
- Faller, Alan; Kaylor, R.E. (1970). "Numerical Studies of Penetrative Convective Instabilities". Journal of Geophysical Research. 75 (3): 521. doi:10.1029/jc075i003p00521.
- Faller, Alan; Mooney, K.A. (1971). "The Ekman Boundary-Layer Stress Due to Flow Over a Regular Array of Hills". Boundary-Layer Meteorology. 2: 83–107. doi:10.1007/bf00718090. S2CID 123402415.
- Faller, Alan (1971). "Oceanic Turbulence and the Langmuir circulations". Annual Review of Ecology and Systematics. 2: 201–236. doi:10.1146/annurev.es.02.110171.001221.
- Faller, Alan (1986). "The Roles of Langmuir Circulations in the Dispersion of Surface Tracers". Journal of Physical Oceanography. 18 (8): 2402–2417.
- Faller, Alan (1992). "Approximate Second-order Two-point Velocity Relations for Turbulent Dispersion". Journal of Fluid Mechanics. 244: 713–720. doi:10.1017/s0022112092003276.
- Faller, Alan J. (2003). The Weather and Climate of Monhegan, 04852. Melrose, MA. 02176: Mainstay Publishing. ISBN 0965859339.

== Awards and honors ==
- John Simon Guggenheim Memorial Foundation Fellow, awarded in 1960 (Natural Sciences, Earth Science)
- Fellow of the American Physical Society, awarded in 1974
- Fellow of the American Meteorological Society
- Professor Emeritus, University of Maryland
