= Tallavajjala Sundaram =

Indian stage actor, director, writer (1950–2022)

- Born: 29 October 1950; Ongole, Andhra Pradesh, India
- Died: 21 March 2022 (aged 71); Hyderabad, Telangana, India
- Occupations: Stage actor; director; writer
- Spouse: Sirisha

Tallavajjala Sundaram (29 October 1950 – 21 March 2022) was a Telugu stage actor, director and writer.

== Biography ==
Sundaram was born on 29 October 1950 in Ongole, Andhra Pradesh. After completing his BSc, he completed his PG Diploma in Performing Arts at Osmania University. After settling in Hyderabad, he devoted his life to drama writing and performing.

Sundaram died of a heart attack on 21 March 2022 at his residence in Chikkadpally, Hyderabad.

== Personal life ==
He married Sirisha, who died four years before his death. He had a son and a daughter.
