= Eberhard Goldhahn =

German politician (1927–2022)

Member of the Bundestag
- In office 3 October 1990 – 20 December 1990

Member of the Volkskammer
- In office 5 April 1990 – 3 October 1990

Personal details
- Born: 8 March 1927 Bernsbach, Saxony, Germany
- Died: 2 March 2022 (aged 94)
- Party: CDU

Eberhard Goldhahn (8 March 1927 – 2 March 2022) was a German politician.

A member of the Christian Democratic Union of Germany, he served in the Volkskammer and the Bundestag in 1990.

Goldhahn died on 2 March 2022, at the age of 94.
