= Luc Laventure =

French journalist (1945–2022)

- Born: 1 February 1945; Grand'Rivière, Martinique
- Died: 6 March 2022 (aged 77); Paris, France
- Occupation: Director of France Ô

Luc Laventure ([lyk lavɑ̃ˈtyr] 1 February 1945 – 6 March 2022) was a French journalist and the director of France Ô and La Première from 1998 to 2011.

Luc born in France and worked in public broadcasting from 1967. He spent most of his career at FR3 Martinique and RFO. He has always worked for the promotion and visibility of the overseas territories in the French audiovisual sector.

He created the online media Outremers360, of which he was president and director of strategy from 2015.

Laventure died on 6 March 2022, at the age of 77.

== Biography ==
Luc Laventure began his career as a journalist at the Office de Radiodiffusion Télévision Française (ORTF) in Martinique in 1967. He was director of France Ô and Outre-Mer 1re from 1998 to 2011. In 2004, he was considered the “number two in overseas television.” He created the online media outlet Outremers360, of which he has been president and director of strategy since 2015.

He is described as “the great figurehead of overseas territories in the world of journalism.”

In 2011, he was awarded the insignia of Knight of the Legion of Honor.

He died following a sudden illness during the night of March 5 to 6, 2022.
