= Jean-Antoine Fiori =

French rally driver (1982–2022)

- Nationality: French
- Born: October 1, 1982
- Died: March 6, 2022 (aged 39) Eccica-Suarella, Corsica, France

France Rally Cup
- Years active: 2007-2022
- Starts: 34
- Wins: 11

Jean-Antoine Fiori was a French rally driver. He was the son of French WRC driver Guy Fiori.

== Career ==
Fiori started competing in rally in 2007, where he entered four races in the A6 class of the France Rally Cup. He achieved one class win among those four races, at Rallye National de Pila Canale. Between 2008 and 2015, he raced in several classes, recording 2 more class wins. In 2015, he participated in the Tour de Corse, placing third in the RC4 class and 37th overall. He moved to driving solely in the R2 class for the France Rally Cup in 2016 onwards, recording eight class wins.

== Death ==
On 6 March 2022, Fiori died in an accident while he was driving in the Rallye Régional d'Eccica Suaredda. During the final stage, 2 km away from the finish, Fiori lost control of his Peugeot 208 R2, which slid off the road and fell into a ravine. Fiori was dead by the time assistance arrived to the vehicle. His co-driver, Julien Tavera, was transported to the hospital with serious injuries after the accident.

== References and external links ==
Driver profile at ewrc-results
