= Stephen Keener =

American actor (1942–2022)

- Born: Stephen Dewayne Keener; December 3, 1942; Cheyenne, Wyoming
- Died: March 30, 2022 (aged 79); Malden, Missouri
- Occupation: voice artist
- Years active: 1986 - 1987

Stephen Keener (December 3, 1942 – March 30, 2022) was a former classically trained actor who provided the voice of various characters in the latter seasons of Transformers. He died on March 30, 2022, from unknown causes.

== Voice roles ==
- Fortress Maximus
- Hardhead
- Hun-Gurr
- Mindwipe
- Scattershot
- Scorponok
