= Nan Melville =

American photographer (1949–2022)

Nan Melville (October 7, 1949 – March 18, 2022) was an American photographer. She specialized in dance photography.
