= Fong Seow Hor =

Malaysian Olympic swimmer (1937–2022)

Fong Seow Hor 冯朝虎
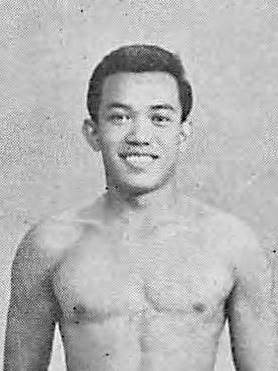

Personal information
- Born: 8 January 1937 Penang, Malaysia
- Died: 9 March 2022 (aged 85) Penang, Malaysia

Sport
- Sport: Swimming

Fong Seow Hor

Chinese name
- Traditional Chinese: 馮朝虎
- Simplified Chinese: 冯朝虎
- Pha̍k-fa-sṳ: Phùng Chhàu-fú
- Jyutping: Fung4 Ciu4 Fu2
- Hokkien POJ: Pâng Tiâu-hó͘
- Tâi-lô: Pâng Tiâu-hóo

Fong Seow Hor (Chinese: 冯朝虎; 8 January 1937–9 March 2022) was a Malaysian former swimmer. He competed at the 1956 Summer Olympics and the 1960 Summer Olympics. He died on 9 March 2022 in Penang, at the age of 85.
