= Dmytro Apukhtin =

Ukrainian colonel (1977–2022)

- Дмитро Олександрович Апухтін
- Born: April 1, 1977; Zaporizhzhia, Ukrainian SSR, Soviet Union
- Died: March 12, 2022 (aged 44); Mariupol, Donetsk region, Ukraine
- Education: National Academy of the National Guard of Ukraine
- Military career
- Allegiance: Ukraine
- Branch: Ukrainian Ground Forces
- Service years: 1997–2022
- Rank: Colonel
- Conflicts: Russo-Ukrainian War; Russian invasion of Ukraine
- Awards: Hero of Ukraine

Dmytro Oleksandrovich Apukhtin (Ukrainian: Дмитро Олександрович Апухтін; April 1, 1977, Zaporizhzhia – March 12, 2022, Mariupol, Donetsk region, Ukraine) — was a Ukrainian colonel who served as deputy commander of the 23rd Public Security Protection Brigade "Khortytsia" of the National Guard of Ukraine. A participant in the Russian-Ukrainian war, he died during the Battle of Mariupol.

== Military service ==
Apukhtin was a graduate of the National Academy of the National Guard of Ukraine (2018, master's degree).

In 2014, Dmytro Apukhtin performed combat and special tasks in the area of an anti-terrorist operation to assist the State Border Guard Service of Ukraine in guarding the state border in the Donetsk region.

Also, from 2014, he repeatedly participated in anti-terrorist operations, the execution of combat and special tasks in the area of the operation of the United Forces.

He headed the units of the National Guard of Ukraine as part of the relevant groups of the United Forces.

Since December 2021, he headed the battalion group of the Southern Special Operations Command of the NSU group in the East Special Operations Center in the area of the United Forces operation .

In the 23rd Public Security Protection Brigade of NSU he served as deputy brigade commander for the past three years. He transferred to the new place of service from the 9th operational regiment of the NSU (military unit 3029), which is also stationed in the city of Zaporizhzhia.

He served for 25 years in the Ukrainian military.

Apukhtin was killed in action on March 12, 2022, near Mariupol during the attack of an enemy column.

== Personal life ==
Apukhtin lived in Zaporizhzhia. He was married, and had two sons and daughter.

== Awards ==
- The title of "Hero of Ukraine" with the Order of the Golden Star (March 25, 2022, posthumously) — for personal courage and heroism, shown in the defense of the state sovereignty and territorial integrity of Ukraine, loyalty to the military oath.
- Award of the President of Ukraine for participation in the anti-terrorist operation (2016 p.).

== Sources ==
- Agibalova V., Kovalenko, S. Dmytro Apukhtin died heroically while defending Mariupol. 02/04/2022, 09:57 // ArmyInform. — 2022. — April 2.
