= Raymond C. Eubanks Jr. =

American judge and politician

Member of the South Carolina House of Representatives
- In office 1965–1968

Personal details
- Born: December 18, 1933 Spartanburg, South Carolina, U.S.
- Died: March 23, 2022 (aged 88)
- Education: Wofford College; University of South Carolina School of Law
- Occupation: Judge

Raymond C. Eubanks Jr. (December 18, 1933 – March 23, 2022) was an American politician. He served as a member of the South Carolina House of Representatives.

== Life and career ==
Eubanks was born in Spartanburg, South Carolina. He attended Spartanburg High School, Wofford College and the University of South Carolina School of Law. He served in the United States Air Force.

In 1965, Eubanks was elected to the South Carolina House of Representatives, representing Spartanburg County, South Carolina. He then ran for the senate in 1968 but lost to Paul M. Moore. In 1980, he was appointed by Governor Richard Riley to serve as a probate judge in Spartanburg County.

Eubanks died on March 23, 2022, at the age of 88. He had been married to Carolyn West Eubanks who died in 2020 and with whom he had two children.
