= Ghanam Al-Jumhur =

Kuwaiti politician (1931–2022)

Ghanam Al-Jumhour

Member of the National Assembly of Kuwait
- In office 1963–1999

Personal details
- Born: 1931 Kuwait City, Kuwait
- Died: 8 March 2022 (aged 90–91) Kuwait City, Kuwait
- Party: Independent

Ghanam Al-Jumhour (Arabic: غنام الجمهور; 1931 – 8 March 2022) was a Kuwaiti politician. An independent, he served in the National Assembly from 1963 to 1999. He died in Kuwait City on 8 March 2022.
