= Adam Shakoor =

American lawyer (1947–2022)

Adam Shakoor (born Adam Caddell; 1947 – March 20, 2022) was an American lawyer, jurist and activist.

Born in the northeast Detroit area and raised in the Sojourner Truth public housing complex, Shakoor studied law at Wayne State University, where he converted to Islam and changed his surname to Shakoor. Following his activism in the 1960s, Shakoor became an attorney. In 1979, he led two successful cases: the defense of the right of Masjid Wali Muhammad, a Detroit mosque, to issue Adhans over a loudspeaker, and a lawsuit against the Michigan Department of Corrections to push for religious accommodations for inmates, leading to the appointment of the Department's first Islamic chaplain. For his efforts, he was subsequently appointed Chief Judge of the 36th District Court by Governor William Milliken in 1981. He was the first Muslim ever appointed to an American judgeship.

After serving two terms, Shakoor retired from the bench in 1989 and served as deputy mayor under Detroit mayor Coleman Young until 1993. After his time as deputy mayor, Shakoor worked as a managing partner for a local law firm from 1994 to 1997, when he joined the firm Shakoor, Grubba & Miller. He launched his own firm, Adam Shakoor & Associates in 2004. He was retained as counsel by Rosa Parks from 1995 until her death in 2005.

Shakoor was married to Gail Lawrence-Shakoor. He had a prior marriage with whom he had eight children.
