= Trevor Hart =

Australian cricketer

Personal information
- Full name: Trevor Herbert Hart
- Born: 18 November 1935; Melbourne, Australia
- Died: 23 March 2022 (aged 86); Mordialloc, Melbourne, Australia
- Batting: Right-handed
- Bowling: Right-arm fast-medium

Domestic team information
- Years: Team
- 1959: Victoria
- Source: Cricinfo, 3 December 2015

Trevor Herbert Hart (18 November 1935 – 23 March 2022) was an Australian cricketer. He played one first-class cricket match for Victoria in 1959.

Hart died in March 2022, at the age of 86.

== See also ==
- List of Victoria first-class cricketers
