= Marshall W. Moore =

American politician (1929–2022)

Marshall W. Moore (December 9, 1929 – March 12, 2022) was an American politician and civil engineer.

Moore was born in Forbes, North Dakota, and he moved with his family to Fargo, North Dakota. He graduated from North Dakota Agricultural College (now North Dakota State University) with a degree in civil engineering. Moore served in the United States Air Force after his graduation. He worked for the Wisconsin Department of Highways from 1956 to 1960. Moore returned to Fargo, North Dakota, and was the co-owner of Moore Engineering with his brother. Moore served in the North Dakota House of Representatives from 1981 to 1987. He then served as state director for the Farmers Home Administration. Moore also served as director of the North Dakota Department of Transportation. Moore died at Sanford Health Center in Bismarck, North Dakota on March 12, 2022, at the age of 92.
