= Richard E. Rumble =

United States Navy admiral (1922–2022)

- Born: October 26, 1922; San Diego, California, U.S.
- Died: March 1, 2022 (aged 99); Virginia Beach, Virginia, U.S.
- Military career
- Allegiance: United States
- Branch: United States Navy
- Rank: Rear admiral

Richard Edwards Rumble (October 26, 1922 – March 1, 2022) was a rear admiral in the United States Navy. He was a former commandant of the Fifth Naval District (1974–1976) and First Naval District. He died on March 1, 2022, at the age of 99.
