= Per Magnar Arnstad =

Norwegian politician (1937–2022)

State Secretary of the Ministry of Transport
- In office 30 October 1972 – 16 October 1973

Personal details
- Born: 6 December 1937 Skatval, Norway
- Died: 7 March 2022 (aged 84) Oslo, Norway
- Party: Sp
- Education: University of Oslo

Per Magnar Arnstad (6 December 1937 – 7 March 2022) was a Norwegian entrepreneur and politician.

== Life and career ==
Arnstad studied at the University of Oslo before directing multiple companies from 1969 and 1997. From 1969 to 1971, he directed Norsk Brædselolje, NHO Transport from 1988 to 1992, and Oslo og Follo busstrafikk from 1993 to 1997.

While at the University of Oslo, Arnstad was a member of the Centre Party student group. He then served as secretary of the party's political group in the Storting from 1965 to 1969 and later was the party's general secretary from 1969 to 1972. In Korvald's Cabinet, he served as State Secretary under Minister of Transport and Communications John Austrheim from 30 October 1972 to 16 October 1973.

Arnstad died in Oslo on 7 March 2022, at the age of 84.
