= Antonio Castro Leache =

Spanish politician (1944–2022)

Member of the Corts Valencianes
- In office 27 July 1987 – 23 July 1999
- Constituency: Province of Valencia

Personal details
- Born: 10 May 1944 Barajas de Melo, Spain
- Died: 18 March 2022 (aged 77)
- Party: PSOE

Antonio Castro Leache (10 May 1944 – 18 March 2022) was a Spanish politician. A member of the Spanish Socialist Workers' Party, he served in the Corts Valencianes from 1987 to 1999. He died on 18 March 2022 at the age of 77.
