= Roger Laouenan =

French writer and historian (1932–2022)

- Born: 28 August 1932; Ploulec'h, France
- Died: 30 March 2022 (aged 89); Lannion, France
- Occupations: Writer; Historian

Roger Laouenan (28 August 1932 – 30 March 2022) was a French writer and historian.

== Biography ==
Born into a family with a peasantry background, Laouenan became a journalist with Le Télégramme. He is a friend of Anjela Duval and published her biography. He was the author of the series Les Bretons dans la Grande guerre, a reference for the history of experiences by the Bretons in World War I.

Laouenan died in Lannion on 30 March 2022, at the age of 89.

== Bibliography ==
- La Nuit du pendu (1959)
- Le Dernier Breton (1978)
- Anjela Duval (1982)
- Le Tocsin de la moisson (1994)
- La Moisson rouge (1994)
- Les Fiancés de la Toussaint (1996)
- Nous les poilus (1998)
- Les Coquelicots de la Marne (1994)
- Les Semailles de guerre (2000)
- Le Pays de Lannion dans la grande guerre (2002)
- Le Moral de l'arrière, Le Trégor dans la Grande Guerre (2002)
- Les Poilus : Dans les tranchées de la Grande Guerre (2003)
- Ce soir d'août (2004)
- Des Demoiselles au feu : L'épopée des fusiliers marins (2004)
- Le pain bleu (2009)
- Le repaire du papillon (2011)
- Les Bretons sous les gaz (2014)
