= Günther Schwarz (politician) =

German politician (1941–2022)

Member of the Landtag of Saarland
- In office 1975–1990

Personal details
- Born: 11 November 1941 Blieskastel, Rhineland, Prussia, Westmark, Germany
- Died: 11 March 2022 (aged 80)
- Party: CDU

Günther Schwarz (11 November 1941 – 12 March 2022) was a German politician.

A member of the Christian Democratic Union of Germany, he served in the Landtag of Saarland from 1975 to 1990. Since 2008, he had been chairman of the Saarland Senior Citizens' Union.

Schwarz died on 12 March 2022, at the age of 80.
