= William C. Camp =

American politician (1946–2022)

William C. Camp (February 20, 1946 – March 19, 2022) was an American politician.

Camp was born in Chicago, Illinois. He moved to Albuquerque, New Mexico, with his family. Camp served in the United States Army Reserve and was commissioned a major. He received his bachelor's and master's degrees from University of New Mexico. Camp owned a restaurant in Albuquerque. He served in the New Mexico House of Representatives from 1984 to 1988. Camp died in Scottsdale, Arizona.
