= Otto Schweizer (footballer) =

German footballer (1924–2022)

Personal information
- Date of birth: 9 November 1924
- Place of birth: Munich, Germany
- Date of death: 3 March 2022 (aged 97)
- Position: Striker

Youth career
- 1939–1943: Bayern Munich

Senior career*
Years	Team	Apps	(Gls)
1943–1953	Bayern Munich	186	(38)
Total		186	(38)
- * Club domestic league appearances and goals

Otto Schweizer (9 November 1924 – 3 March 2022) was a German footballer who spent 14 years as a player with Bayern Munich, ten with the first team, for whom he also served as captain. Schweizer played as a striker.

Schweizer was an honorary member of Bayern Munich's council from 2004 to 2016. Schweizer was later honoured with Bayern Munich's "number 1" club membership in 2018. Schweizer died in March 2022, at the age of 97. At the time of his death, he had an 83-year association with the club.
