= David Ash (cricketer) =

English cricketer (1944–2022)

David Leslie Ash (18 February 1944 – 9 March 2022) was an English first-class cricketer. He played three matches for Yorkshire County Cricket Club in 1965 at the age of 21. A slow left arm bowler and right-handed batsman, he scored a total of 22 runs but failed to take a wicket.

Ash was educated at Fulneck School. He played for Yorkshire 2nd XI from 1963 to 1966, and went on to appear for Cumberland in 1968, and gave them valuable service for several seasons along with Penrith C.C., where he was professional from 1968 to 1975, taking 512 wickets at 10.14.
