= Sally Watson =

American author (1924–2022)

Sally Watson (January 28, 1924 – March 11, 2022) was an American author best known for her English Family Tree series, which encompasses generations of a family with roots in England and Scotland, and branches that stretch to early America. Other books are set in such places as Ancient Egypt and early modern Israel, and she also wrote two memoirs.

== Biography ==
Watson was born in Seattle, Washington and attended Reed College. She began writing fiction in 1953; while doing so she worked for Great Books and co-wrote the audio-visual reading course, Listen and Learn with Phonics. In 1964 she moved to England, where she lived for 24 years, writing meticulously researched juvenile historical fiction featuring feisty and adventurous heroines, such as Jade, published by Henry Holt and Company. Her other activities included Scottish highland dance, teaching Judo, in which she earned a black belt, and Mensa International. The publishing climate for juvenile fiction eventually changed, and by the mid-1970s her books had gone out of print.

Watson eventually returned to the United States, taking up residence in Santa Rosa, California, where she became active in feral cat rescue organizations. All the while her fans were pleading for her books to be republished; eventually Image Cascade reprinted many of the novels. Sally has continued to add to her English family tree series and has also published several young adult novels set in Ancient Egypt. Her most recent books are Tailwavers, a story for all cat lovers, told in part through a series of letters, The Next Pharaoh, a novel continuing her Egyptian history, Return of the Exiles, set during the rebirth of Israel, and Dance to a Different Piper, a memoir covering the first 30 years of her long and productive life.

Watson died on March 11, 2022, in her hometown of Santa Rosa, California, at the age of 98.

== Bibliography ==
=== English family tree series ===
The historical novels Sally Watson has laid in Great Britain and America are separate and complete, yet are united by a family tree. They romp across four centuries, from 1582 London to 1892 Northern California. No one gets a starring role twice, but main characters sometimes reappear in another book in a relatively minor role as grandparent, sibling, cousin, lover or even a wayward eyebrow. The predominant family trait seems to be producing and marrying strong-willed women. Though the protagonists range in age from eleven to adult, and some are specifically juvenile and others definitely adult, the characterization, vocabulary, and plotting are appropriate to all ages from—say—eleven up.

- Highland Rebel (1954)
- Mistress Malapert (1955)
- Witch of the Glens (1962)
- Lark (1964)
- The Hornet's Nest (1968)
- Jade (1969)
- Linnet (1971)
- The Outrageous Oriel (2006) (Young adult)
- Loyal and the Dragon (2008) (Young adult)
- Castle Adamant (2009) (Young adult)

=== Juvenile historical novels ===
- To Build a Land (1957)
- Poor Felicity (1961)
- Other Sandals (1966)
- The Mukhtar's Children (1968)
- Magic at Wychwood (1970)
- The Wayward Princess (2006)
- The Delicate Pioneer (2007) (slight revision of "Poor Felicity")

=== Adult novels ===
- The Ivory Cat (2007)
- The Missing Queen (2008)
- The Angry Earth (2009)
- The Next Pharaoh (2012)
- Return of the Exiles (2014)

=== Autobiographical Works ===
- Tailwavers (2010)
- Dance to a Different Piper (2015)

== Honors ==
To Build a Land won the Woodward Annual Award in 1959.

Witch of the Glens was on the Horn Book Magazine honor list in 1963.

The Mukhtar's Children was named as a Horn Book Magazine Fanfare Best Book of the Year in 1968 .

Magic at Wychwood was recommended by Library Journal in 1970.

Linnet was a Junior Literary Guild selection in 1971.
