= John and Mable Ringling Museum of Art =

Art museum in Sarasota, Florida, US

The Ringling Museum
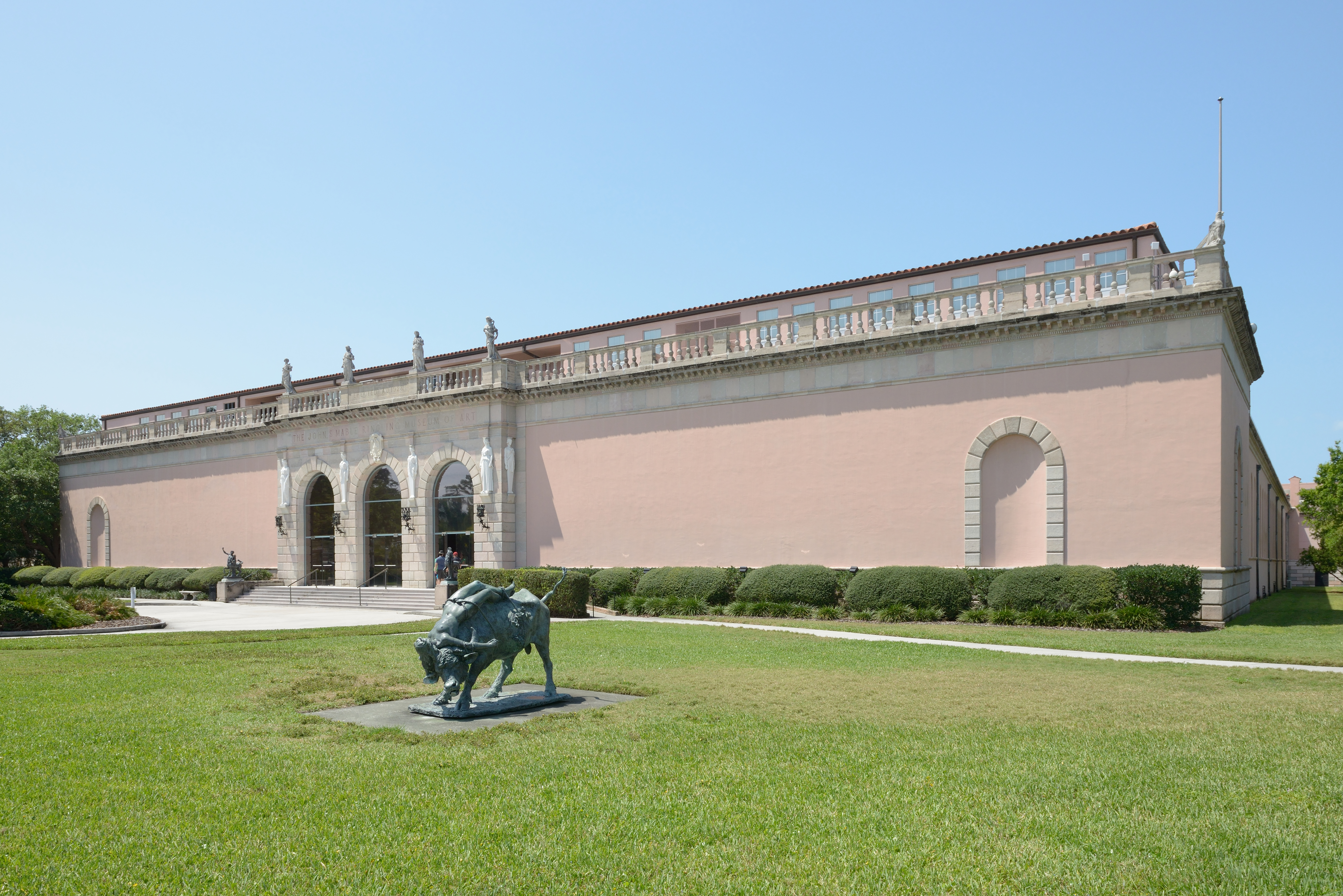
- Main facade of the museum

- Location in Florida
- Location: 5401 Bay Shore Road; Sarasota, Florida
- Coordinates: 27°22′59″N 82°33′33″W
- Type: Art museum
- Executive director: Steven High
- Curator: Sarah Cartwright
- Architect: John H. Phillips
- Public transit access: Sarasota County Area Transit
- Website: www.ringling.org

The Ringling Museum also called the John and Mable Ringling Museum of Art is the official art museum of the state of Florida, located in Sarasota, Florida, United States. It was established in 1927 as the legacy of Mable Burton Ringling and John Ringling for the people of Florida. Florida State University assumed governance of the museum in 2000.

The institution offers 21 galleries of European paintings as well as Cypriot antiquities and Asian, American, and contemporary art. The museum's art collection consists of more than 10,000 objects, including paintings, sculpture, drawings, prints, photographs, and decorative arts from ancient through contemporary periods. Notable holdings include 16th–20th-century European paintings, especially a significant collection of works by Peter Paul Rubens. Other artists represented include Benjamin West, Marcel Duchamp, Mark Kostabi, Baruj Salinas, Diego Velázquez, Paolo Veronese, Rosa Bonheur, Gianlorenzo Bernini, Giuliano Finelli, Lucas Cranach the Elder, Frans Hals, Nicolas Poussin, Joseph Wright of Derby, Thomas Gainsborough, Eugène Boudin, and Benedetto Pagni.

In all, more than 150,000 square feet (14,000 m^{2}) have been added to the campus, which includes the art museum, the Circus Museum, Ca' d'Zan, and the historic Asolo Theater. New additions to the campus include the McKay Visitor's Pavilion, the Kotler-Coville Glass Pavilion exhibiting studio glass art, the Johnson-Blalock Education Building housing The Ringling Art Library and Cuneo Conservation Lab, the Tibbals Learning Center complete with a miniature circus, the Searing Wing, a 30,000-square-foot (2,800 m^{2}) gallery for special exhibitions attached to the art museum, the Chao Center for Asian Art, and the Monda Gallery for Contemporary Art.

== History ==
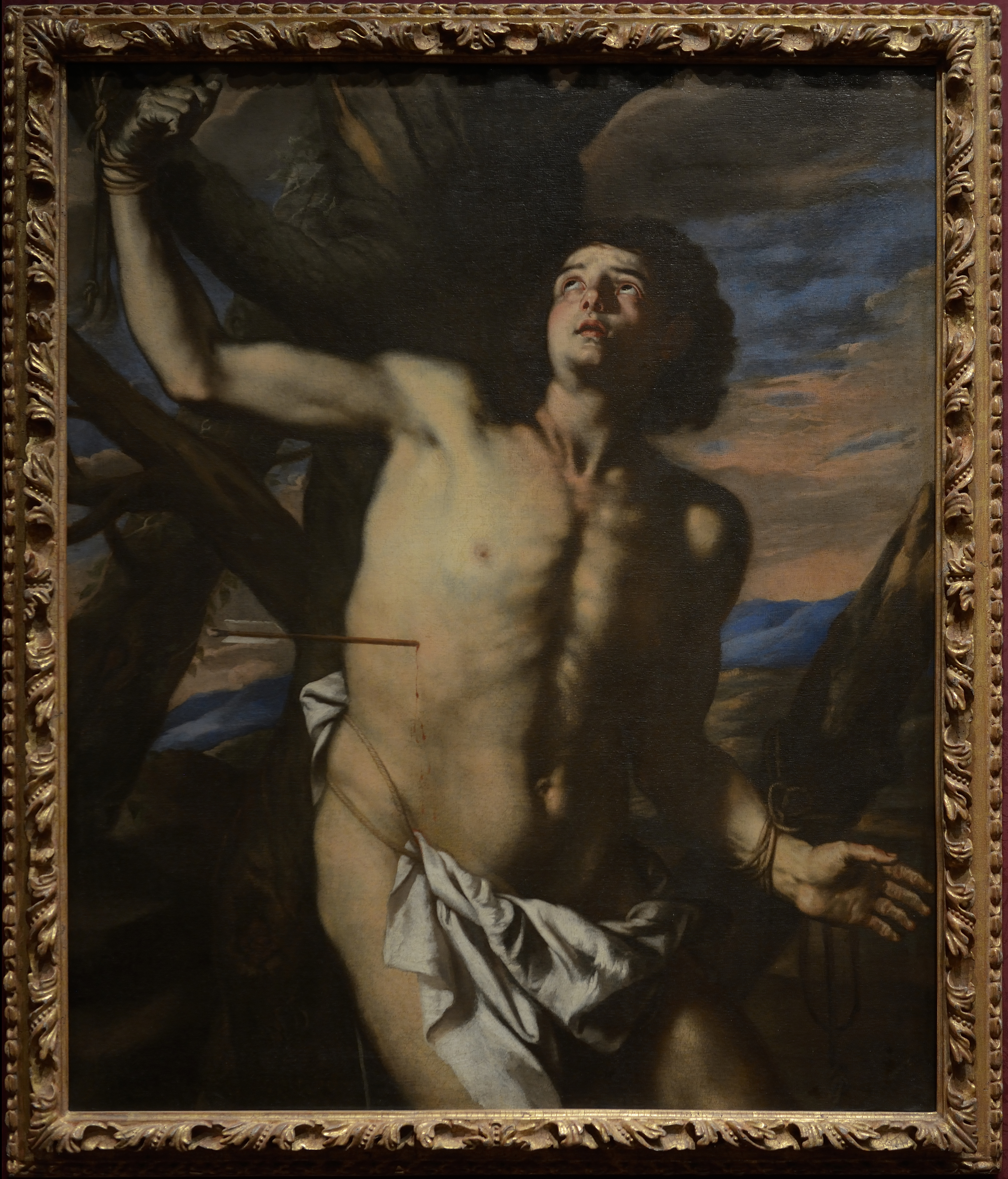
Saint Sebastian by Niccolò De Simone in the Neapolitan paintings section

=== Construction and planning ===
In 1925, John Ringling hired architect John H. Phillips to design the museum. Phillips believed Sarasota would be an ideal location for a museum with Italian-inspired architecture. Dredging and filling were carried out on the marshy Shell Beach site to prepare for construction, which began on June 27, 1927. Due to financial constraints, Ringling abandoned two other concurrent projects: the Sarasota Ritz-Carlton and Ringling Estates.

Ringling also envisioned establishing an art school on the museum grounds. Following the death of his wife, Mable, in June 1929, he became increasingly determined to found the John Ringling University. However, this never materialized due to his financial limitations and lack of experience in higher education.

Initial construction was undertaken by Hageman and Harris, later replaced by Chase and McElroy. Although originally scheduled to open in February 1930, the museum's debut was delayed. It opened briefly in 1930 and again in 1931 before officially opening on January 17, 1932.

=== Opening to Florida State University transfer ===
John Ringling willed his property and art collection, plus a $1.2 million endowment, to the people of the State of Florida upon his death in 1936. One instruction of the will stated that no one had permission to ever change the official name of the museum. For the next 10 years, the museum was open irregularly and not maintained professionally. Ca' d'Zan was not opened to the public while the state fought with Ringling's creditors over the estate (Ringling was nearly bankrupt at his death; Florida would finally prevail in court in 1946).

A. Everett "Chick" Austin Jr., who was the former director of the Wadsworth Athenaeum and a member of the International Brotherhood of Magicians, was appointed director of the museum in 1946. From 1932 to 1946, the museum had no director. Although Mable Ringling was listed as director in the museum's charter, she died in 1929 before it opened.

Dr. Laurence J. Ruggiero was director of the John and Mable Ringling Museum of Art from 1985 to 1992. He had served in the Finance Department and as Assistant to the President at the Metropolitan Museum of Art, and was director of the Oakland Museum Association. In 1989, the Circus Gallery was renovated. On January 19, 1991, the newly restored museum reopened. Curators from the Metropolitan Museum of Art, the Baltimore Museum, and Metropolitan architect Arthur Rosenblatt contributed to the initial evaluation. Restoration work was carried out by museum staff, conservators, and exhibition designer George Sexton, with construction funded by the State of Florida. The project received support from the Florida Legislature, Governors Bob Graham, Bob Martinez, and Lawton Chiles, and numerous private donors.

Even after prevailing in court, the Florida Department of State, which initially held responsibility for the museum, did virtually nothing to manage the endowment or maintain the property. The local community, assuming the museum was the state's responsibility, also provided little support. By the late 1990s, Ca' d'Zan was falling apart, and the exterior footpaths and roads were in disrepair. The museum had a serious roof leak, its security systems were inadequate to protect the collection, and the Asolo Theater building had been condemned. Meanwhile, the $1.2 million endowment had grown to only $2 million.

=== Florida State University transfer ===
The State of Florida transferred responsibility for the museum to Florida State University in 2000. As part of the reorganization, a board of trustees was created, consisting of no more than 31 members, with at least one-third required to be residents of either Manatee or Sarasota counties.

In 2002, the state appropriated $42.9 million in construction funds on the condition that the museum raise $50 million in private-sector support within five years. The museum ultimately raised $55 million by the deadline.

In January 2007, a $76 million expansion and renovation of the Museum of Art was completed. The Arthur F. and Ulla R. Searing Wing was added as the final component of a five-year master plan that transformed the museum. It is now the sixteenth largest art museum in the United States.

In 2013, the John and Mable Ringling Museum of Art was renamed The Ringling.

=== Continued developments ===
The Ringling continued expanding its galleries and educational spaces in the years following the major renovations. In 2016, the Ting Tsung and Wei Fong Chao Center for Asian Art opened, dedicated to fostering appreciation of Asian history and art. The expansion was design by Boston based architecture firm Machado-Silvetti. That same year, the Keith D. Monda Gallery for Contemporary Art debuted as the first space at The Ringling focused specifically on modern art.

In 2018, the Kotler-Coville Glass Pavilion opened as the new entrance to the Historic Asolo Theater. It showcases a growing collection of studio glass and offers free public admission.

=== 2024 hurricanes ===
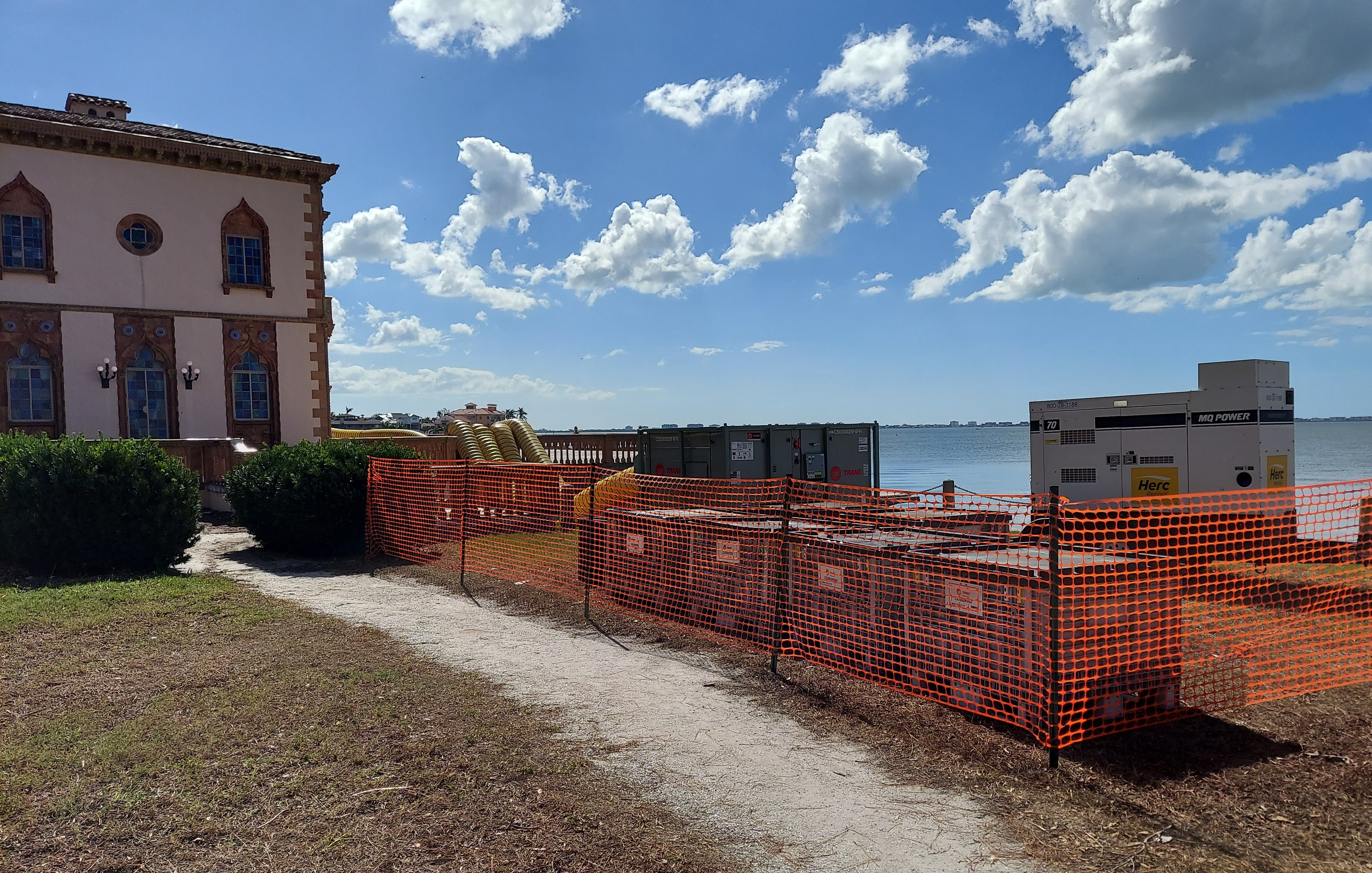
Temporary HVAC units on north lawn of Ca' d'Zan in November, 2024

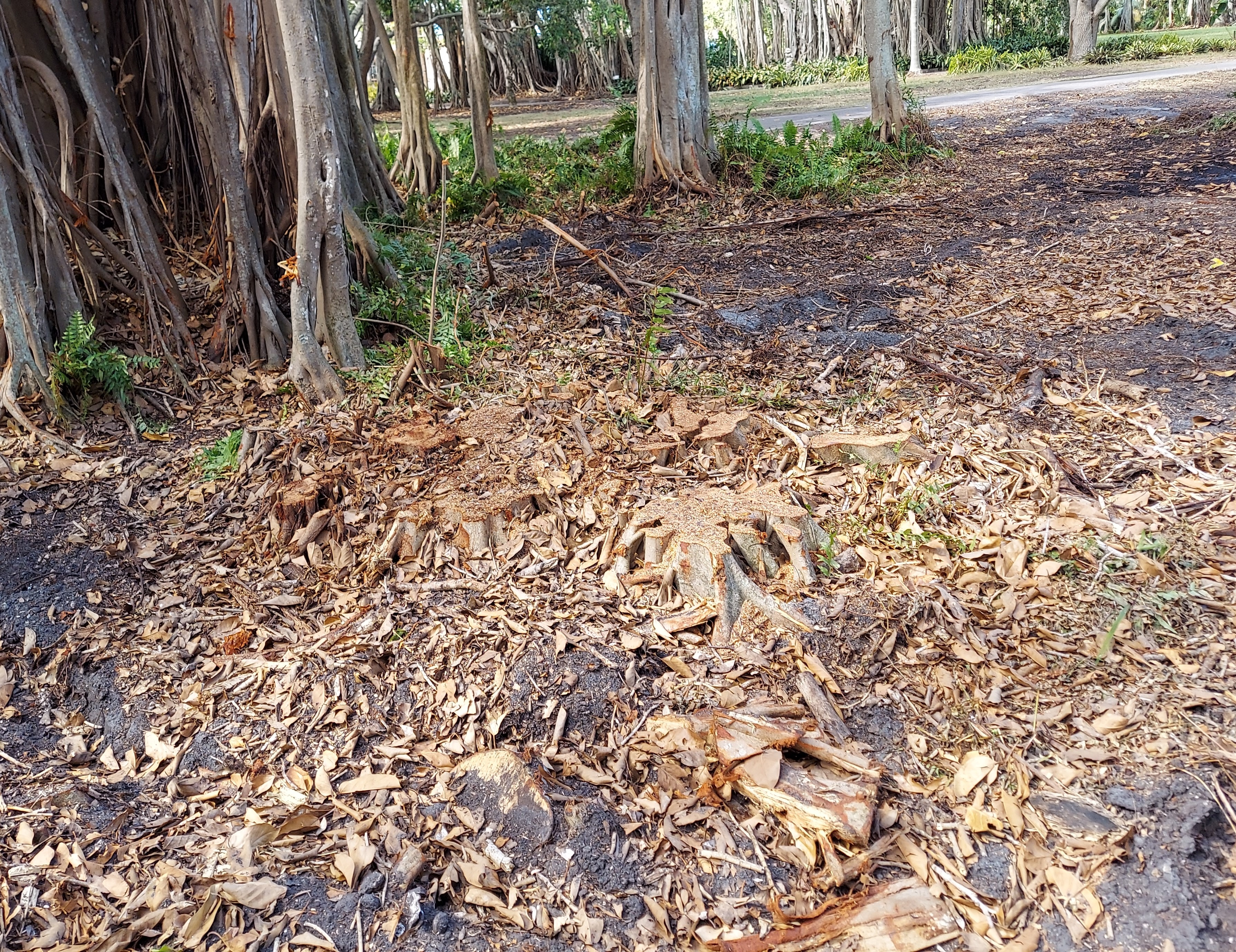
Stump of a hurricane-damaged banyan tree

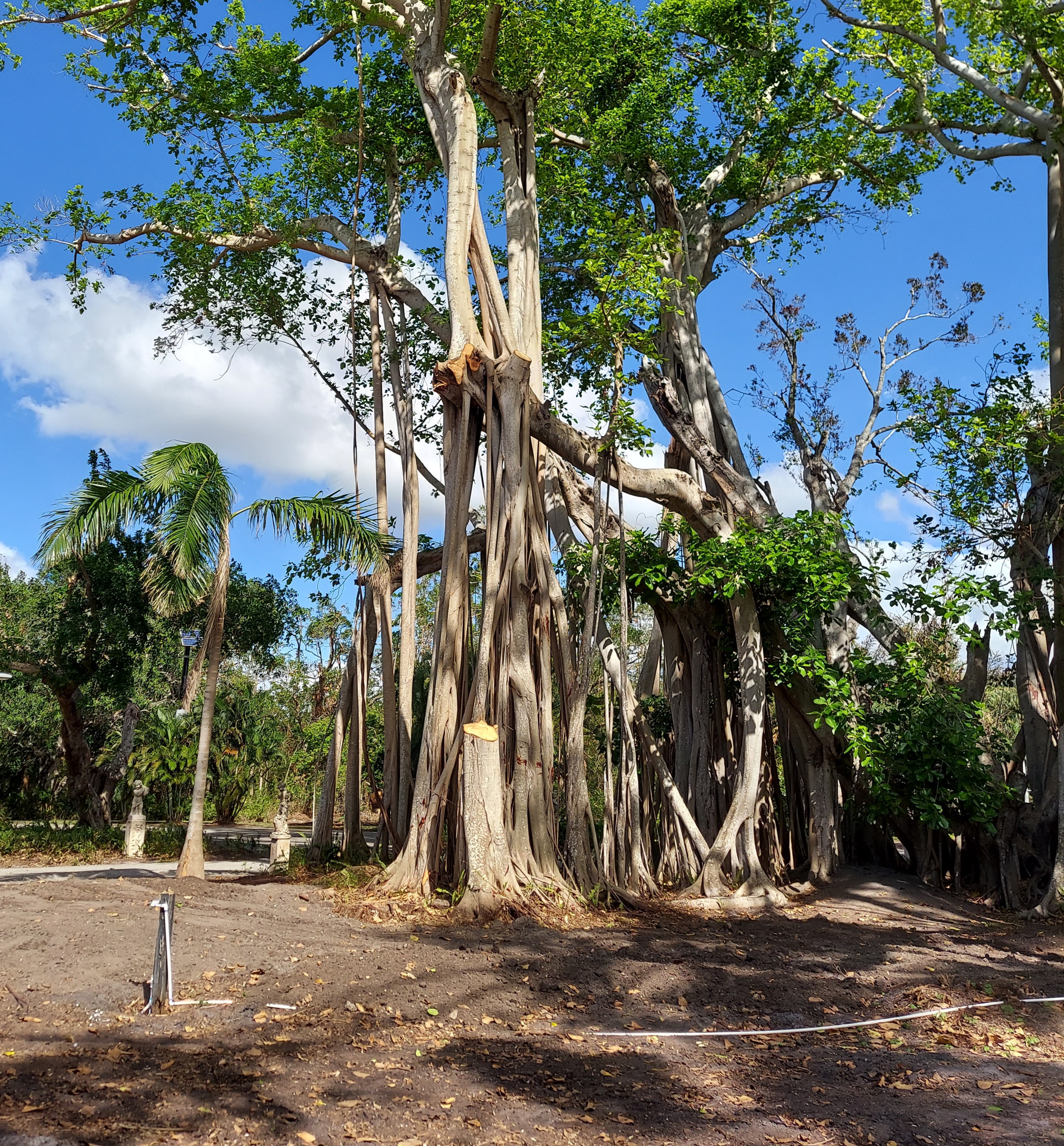
Cut-back banyan trees near the Ringling Cottage in the estate's northeast area

In September and October 2024, Hurricanes Helene and Milton struck Florida's west coast, causing significant flooding and wind damage to Sarasota and the Ringling estate.

The roof of the Circus Museum was damaged, resulting in interior water infiltration. While no exhibits were harmed, the building was closed to the public for several weeks during repairs.

The Joseph's Coat skyspace exhibit by James Turrell, located in the Searing Wing of the Museum of Art, also closed temporarily during storm cleanup. It reopened in early December 2024.

Ca' d'Zan, the Ringlings' 1926 waterfront mansion, sustained major damage to its lower terrace, roof, and climate control systems. Eight feet of water flooded the basement housing the HVAC and other infrastructure. Displaced roof tiles led to water damage in upstairs rooms, and unmoored boats struck the terrace's support columns. Museum staff and FSU affiliates quickly worked to stabilize the building's interior environment. The mansion was closed to visitors indefinitely while restoration planning commenced.

The estate's grounds were among the hardest hit, especially the large hammocks of banyan trees and strangler figs. The Millennium Tree Trail remained closed for weeks as crews removed damaged trees.

The Historic Asolo Theater and the Museum of Art sustained no lasting damage, and all collections were unharmed. After power was restored following Hurricane Milton, the Ringling Museum reopened within days, offering free admission as a respite for Sarasota residents recovering from the storms.

== Ringling estate ==
Aside from the art museum, the estate also includes the Ringlings' mansion, Ca' d'Zan; Mable Ringling's rose garden; the Circus Museum and Tibbals Learning Center; the historic Asolo Theater; the Ringling Art Library; the Secret Garden, which contains the graves of John and Mable Ringling; and the FSU Center for the Performing Arts.

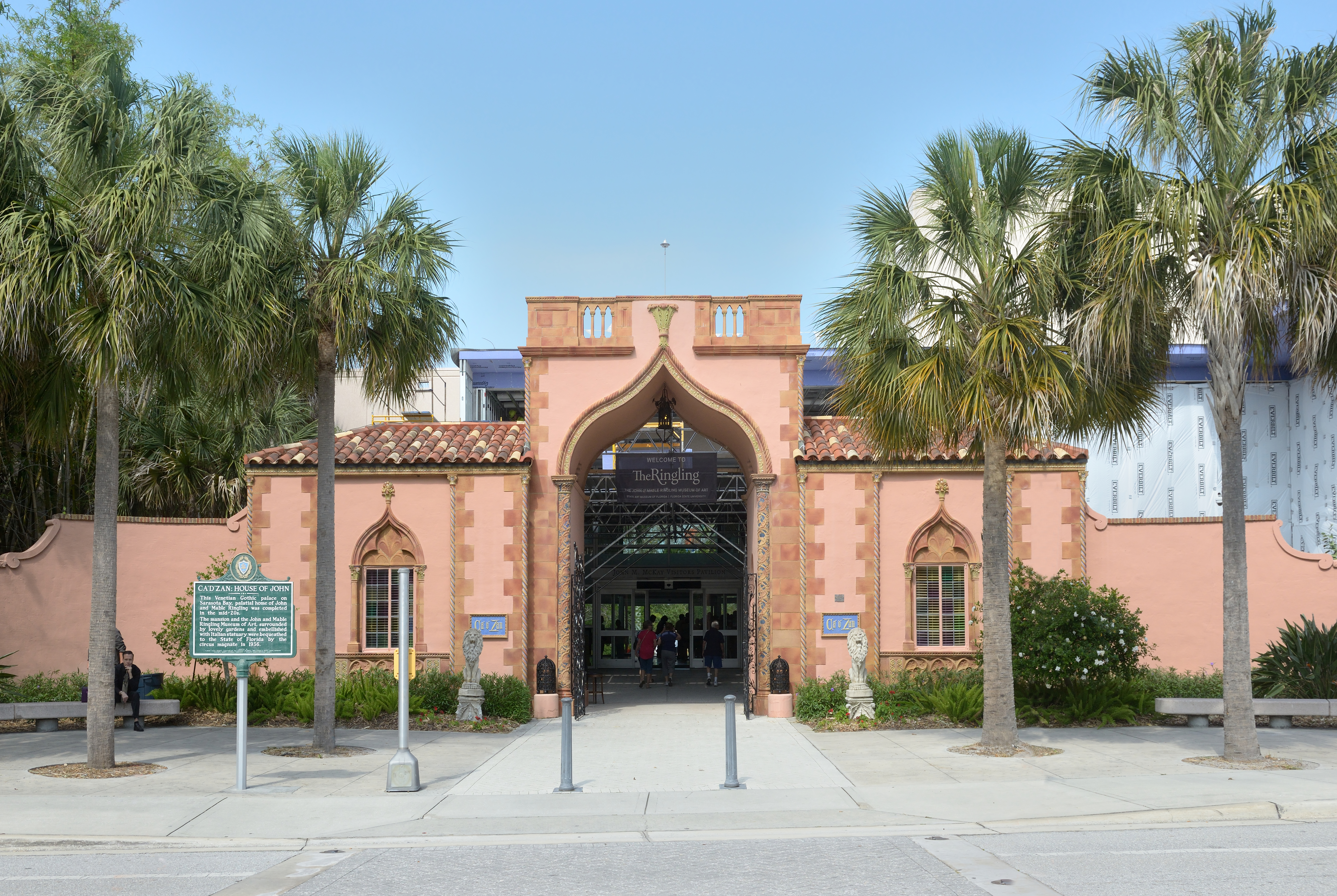
Main entrance

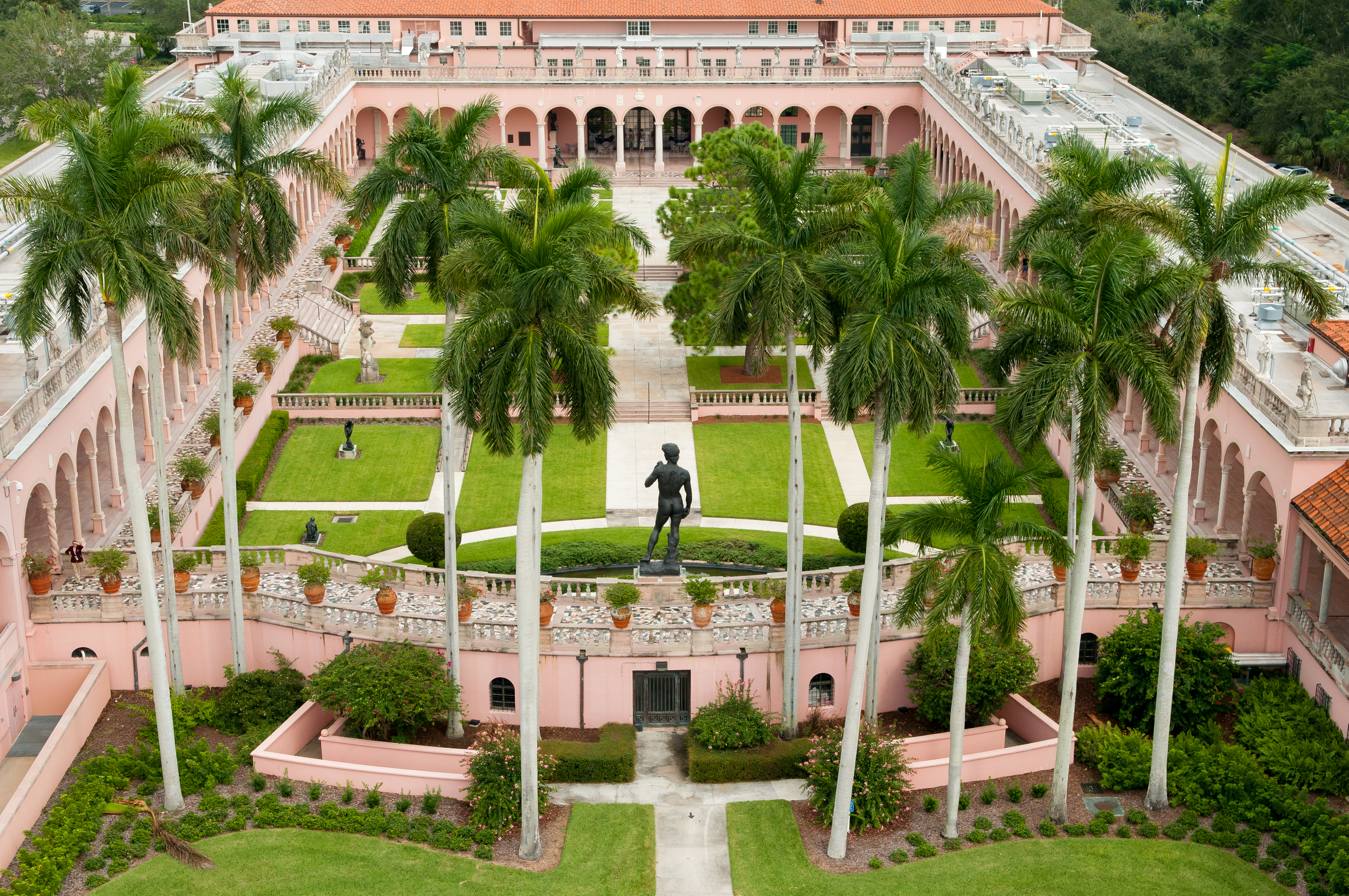
Aerial view of the museum courtyard

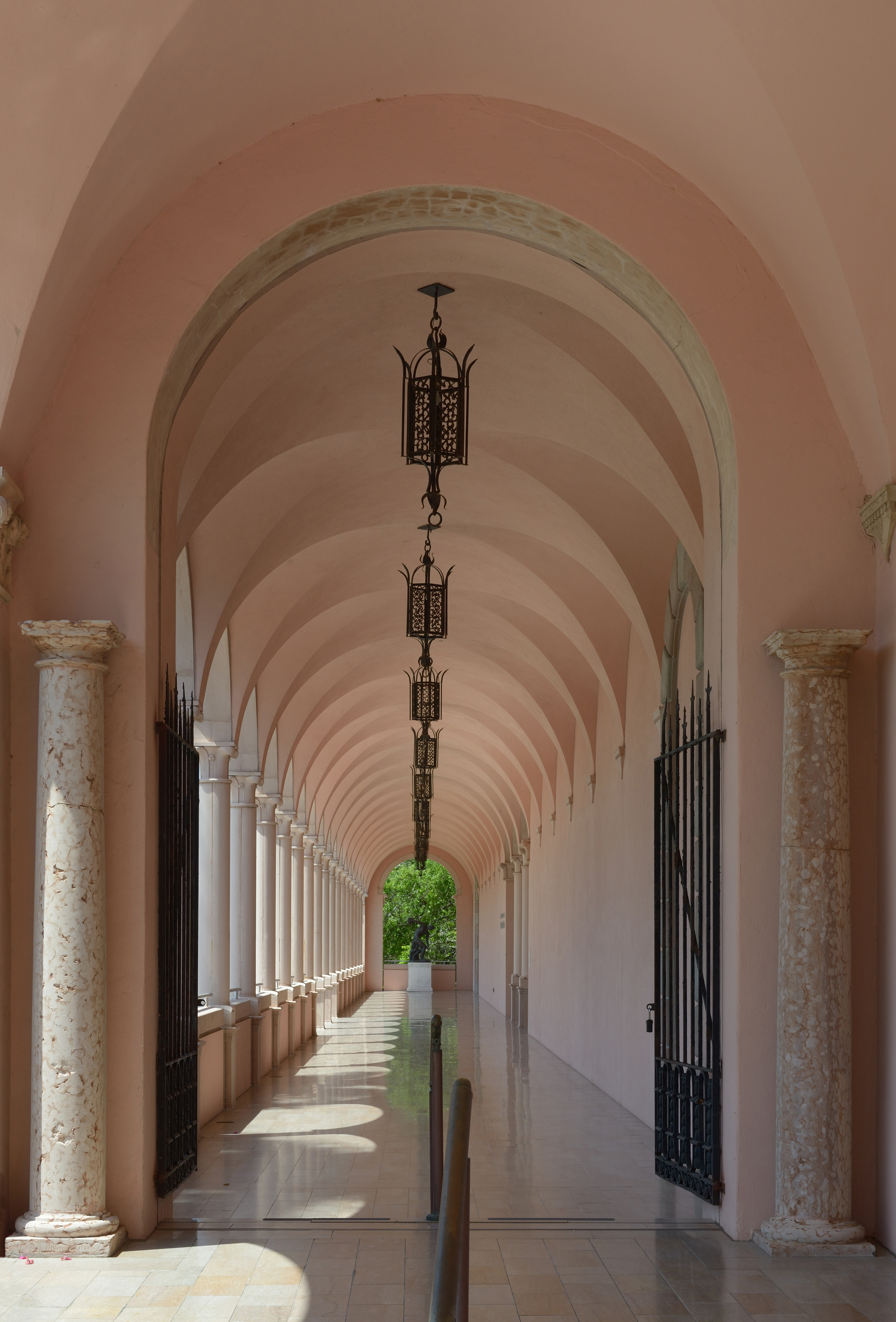
Museum of Art Loggia

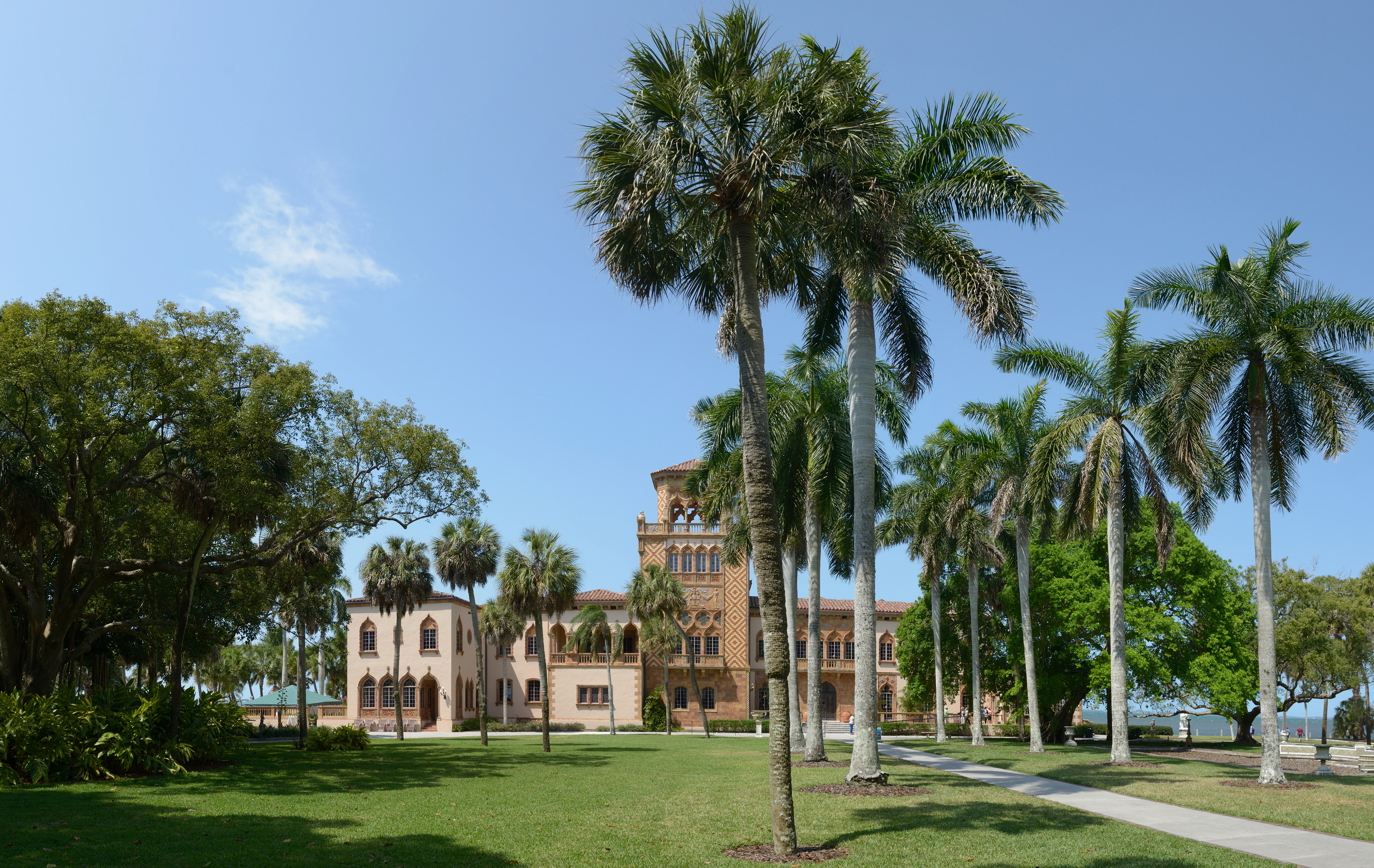
Ca' d'Zan

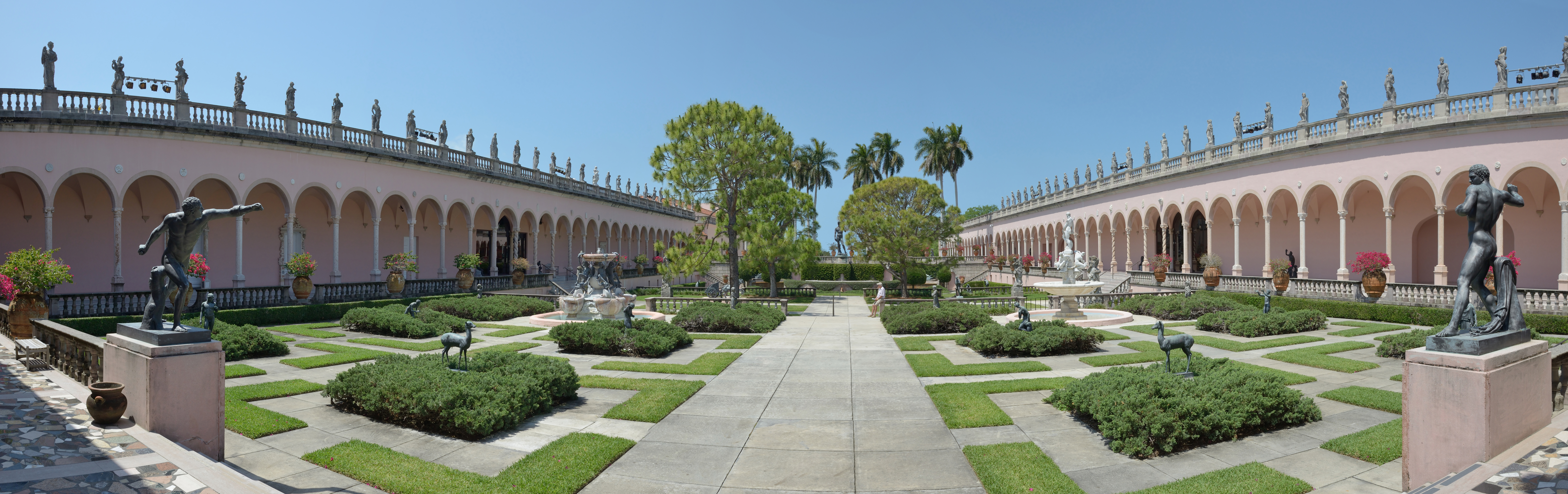
Statues courtyard

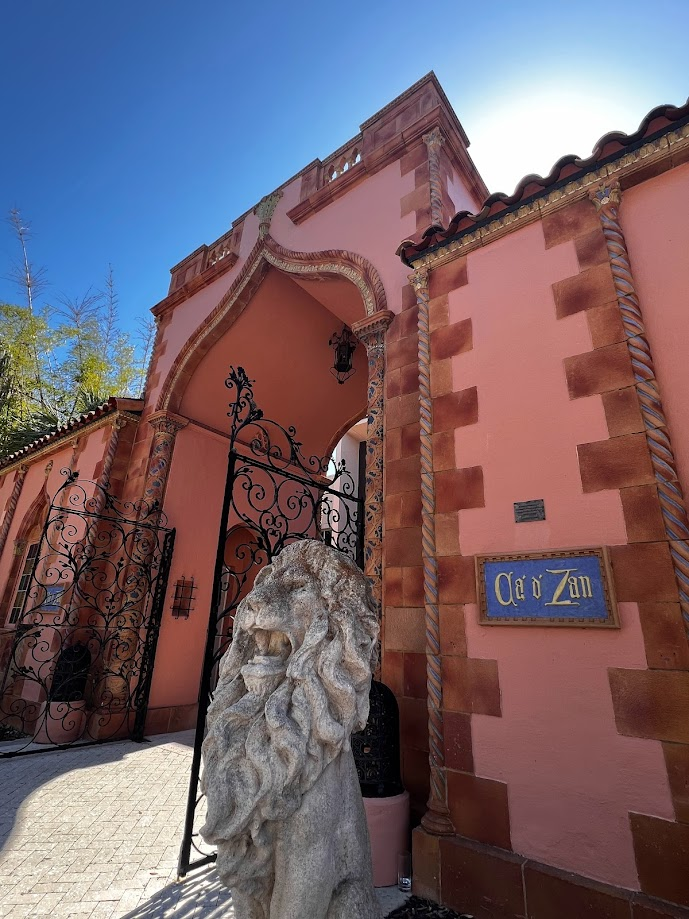
Mansion entrance – street view

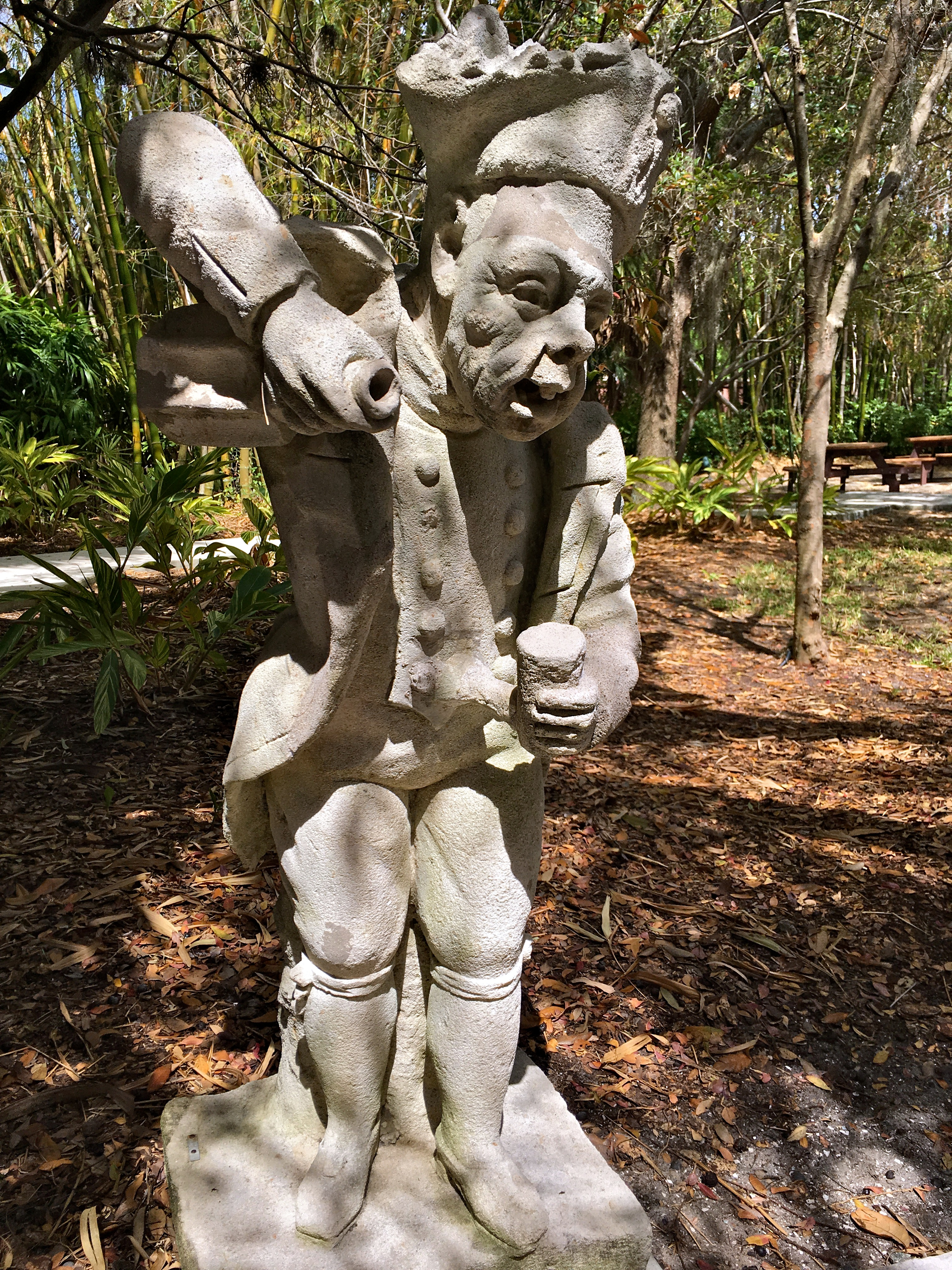
Stone statue in the garden

=== Dwarf Garden ===
The Dwarf Garden showcases stone statues that the Ringlings brought back with them during their years of travel in Europe. The Commedia dell'arte-like figures are arranged along a circular path and between banyan tree hammocks and thick stands of bamboo.

=== Ca' d'Zan ===
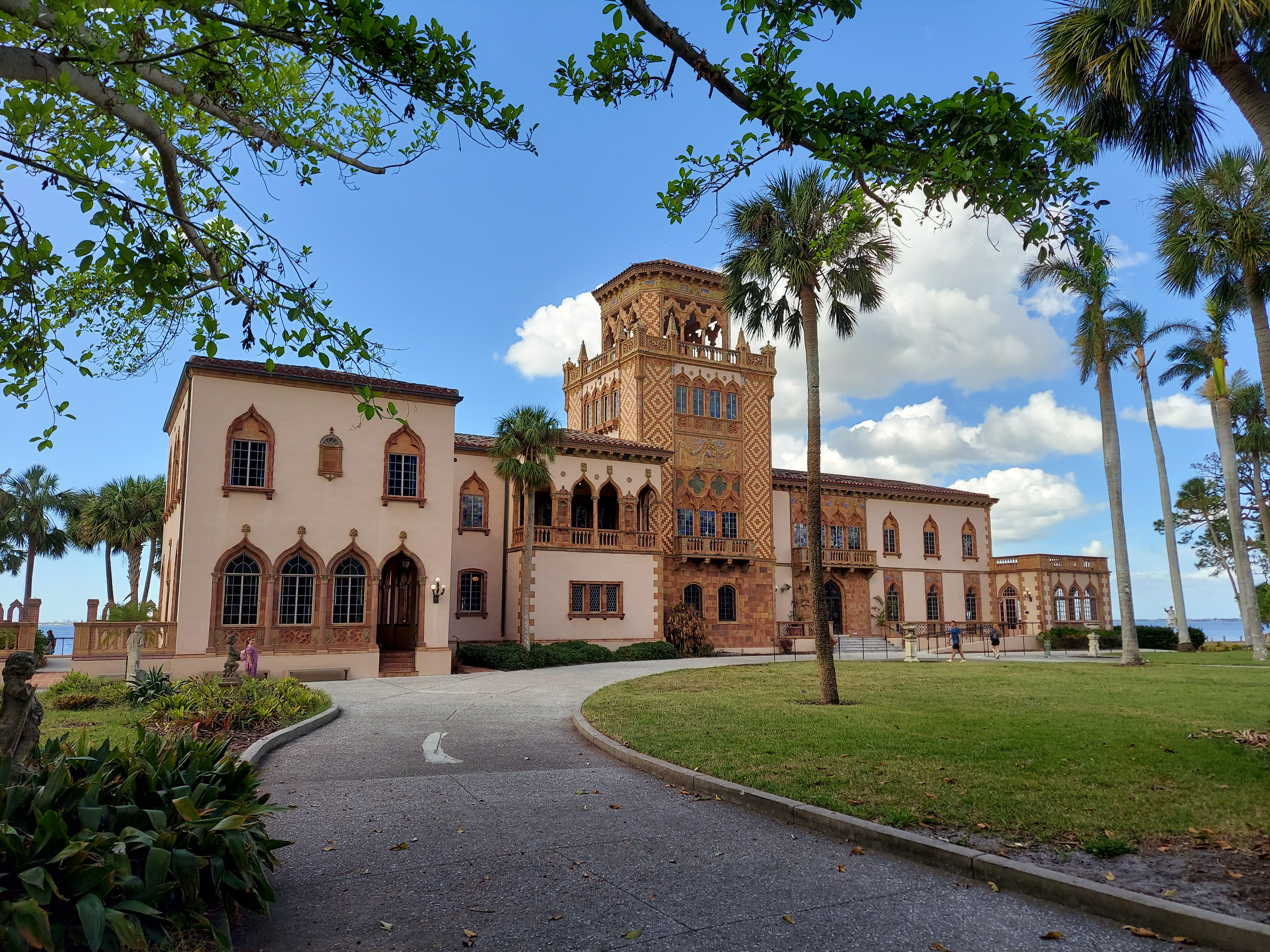
Front facade of Ca' d'Zan

Ca' d'Zan (House of John) is the waterfront residence built for Mable and John Ringling. The mansion was designed by architect Dwight James Baum, with input from the Ringlings, and constructed by Owen Burns. It was completed in 1926.

The house is designed in the Venetian Gothic style. Overlooking Sarasota Bay, it served as a hub for Sarasota's cultural life for many years. The residence was restored in 2002.

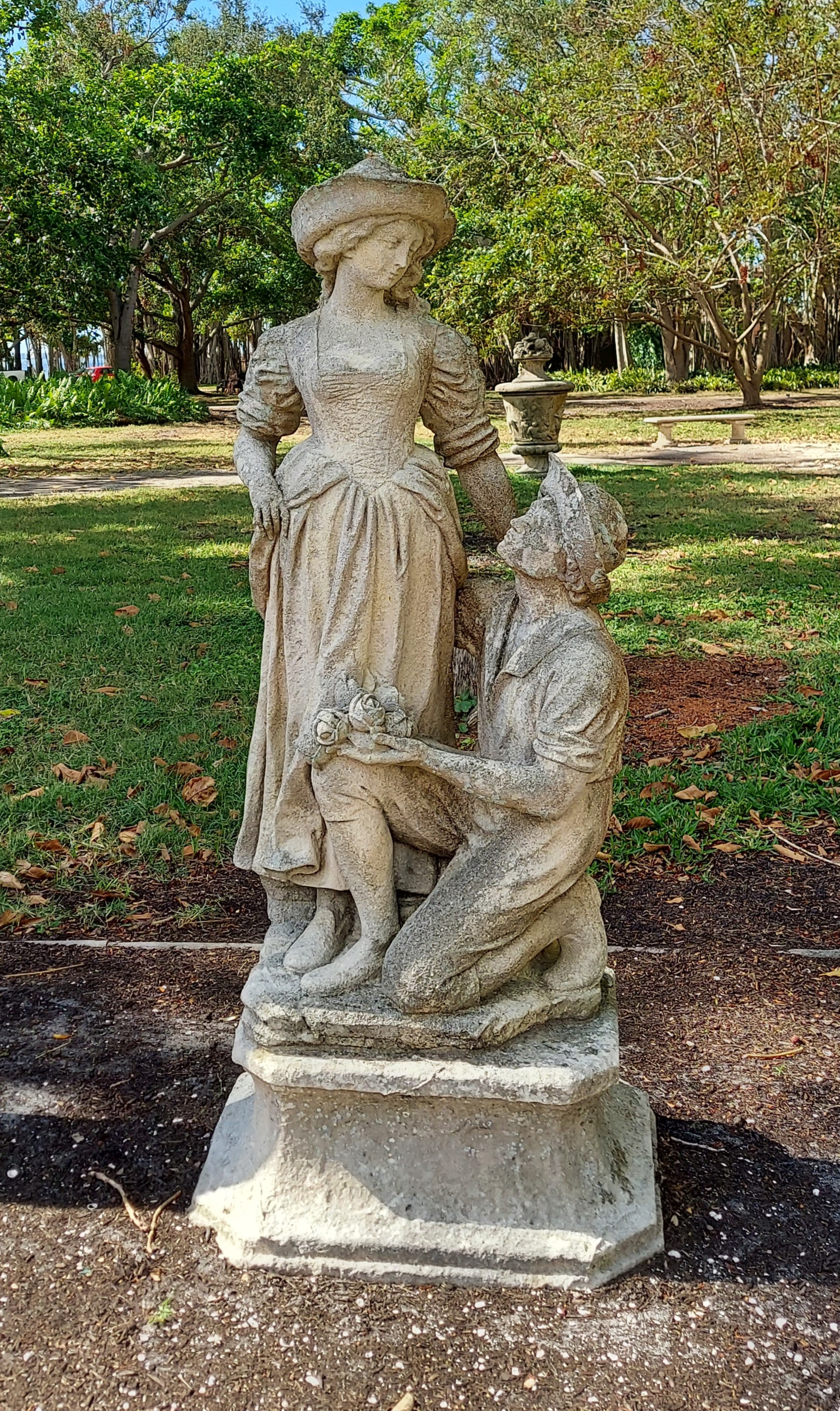
A romantic statue bordering Mable's Rose Garden at The Ringling

=== Rose Garden ===
Mable Ringling's rose garden was completed in 1913, while she and John were residing in another house on the estate. It is located near the original Mary Louise and Charles N. Thompson residence, within the landscaped grounds overlooking Sarasota Bay.

John and Mable Ringling are both buried near the rose garden, in a section known as the Secret Garden. The rose garden is surrounded by stone statues arranged in pairs, depicting figures in Italian peasant clothing engaged in scenes of courtship.

=== Circus Museum and the Tibbals Learning Center ===
The Circus Museum, established in 1948, was the first museum in the United States dedicated to documenting circus history. Its collections include handbills, posters, art prints, business records, wardrobe, performance props, circus equipment, and parade wagons.

The adjacent Tibbals Learning Center houses The Howard Bros. Circus model. Built by Howard Tibbals, this 3/4-inch-to-the-foot scale model replicates the Ringling Bros. and Barnum & Bailey Circus as it appeared from 1919 to 1938. It is billed as the "world's largest miniature circus."

=== Wisconsin railroad car ===
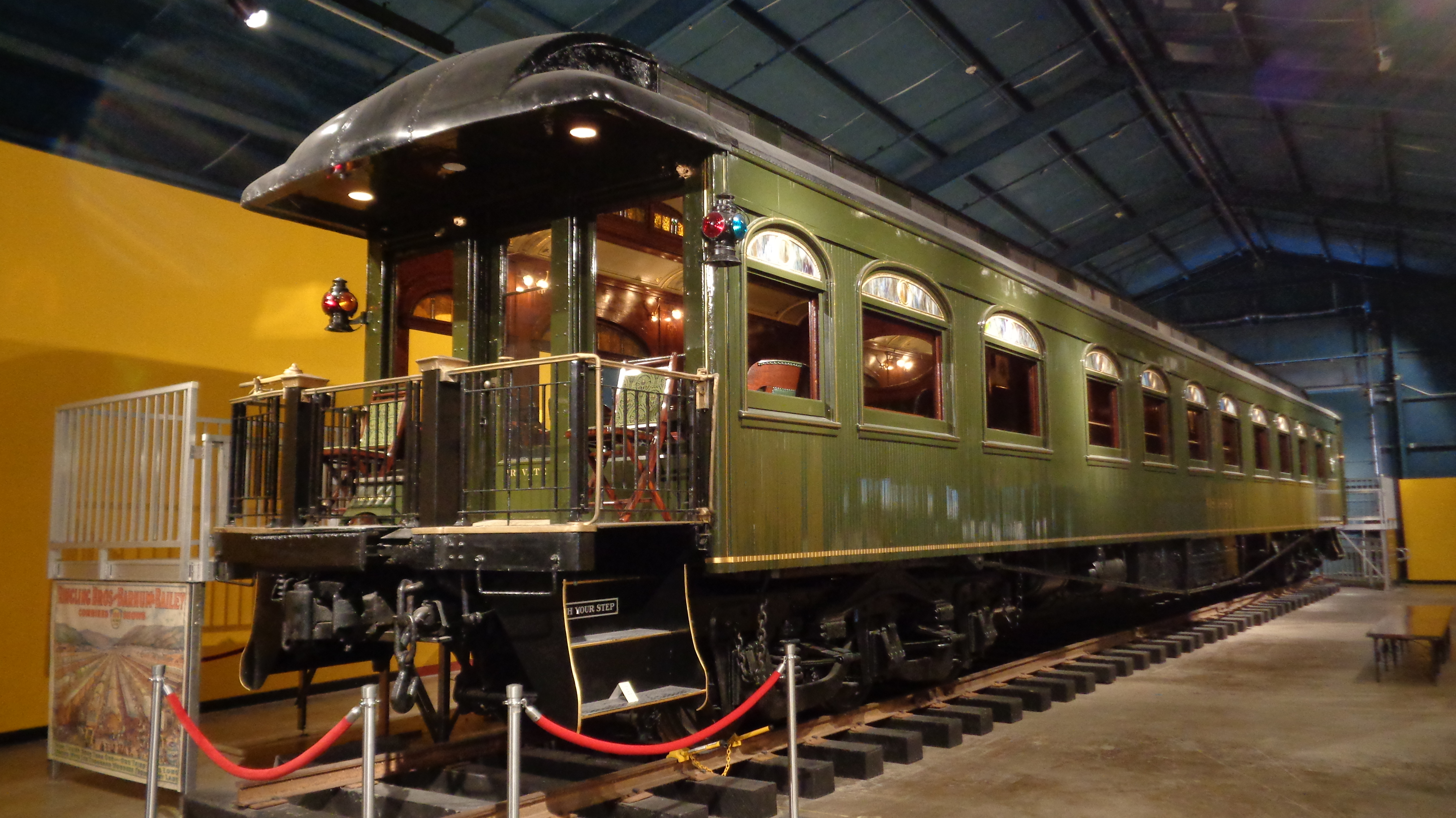
The Wisconsin railroad car in 2019

John Ringling owned a private railroad car and used it from 1905 to 1917 to travel with his circus, take vacations, and conduct business trips. He named it after his home state of Wisconsin, which was also where his circus was quartered.

The Wisconsin was built by the Pullman Company in Pullman, Illinois. Its cost of $11,325.23 was only about half the price of a comparable Pullman car at the time, as it was outfitted with walls taken from other railroad cars. The wooden observation car weighs 65 short tons (59 metric tons) and is 79 feet (24 m) long, 14 feet (4.3 m) tall, and 10 feet (3.0 m) wide. It is divided into an observation room, three staterooms, a dining room, a kitchen, a bathroom, and servants' quarters. The interior is made of mahogany and other woods, with intricate moldings, gold-leaf stencils, and stained glass. The 10-foot-high ceilings are painted viva gold, baize green, and fiery brown.

When New York City banned wooden train cars from its tunnels, Ringling decided to sell the Wisconsin. The Norfolk Southern Railroad later purchased it and renamed it Virginia, using it as a business car for its officials. It was then sold to the Atlantic & East Carolina Railway, which renamed it Carolina, adapted it into a fishing lodge, and placed it in Morehead City, North Carolina. The North Carolina Transportation Museum acquired the car next and kept it in covered storage on its grounds in Spencer, North Carolina.

The car's next and current owner is the John and Mable Ringling Museum. A $417,240 federal grant awarded to the Florida Department of Transportation (FDOT) helped pay for restoration of the exterior, which was completed by the Edwards Rail Car Company in Montgomery, Alabama. An anonymous donation of $100,000 funded the interior restoration, returning it to its Gilded Age state, with work done on-site at the museum. The Sarasota County Parks, Recreation, and Natural Resources (PRNR) donated tracks made available through the Rails to Trails project, and volunteers from the Florida Railroad Museum in Parrish laid them.

=== Ringling Art Library ===
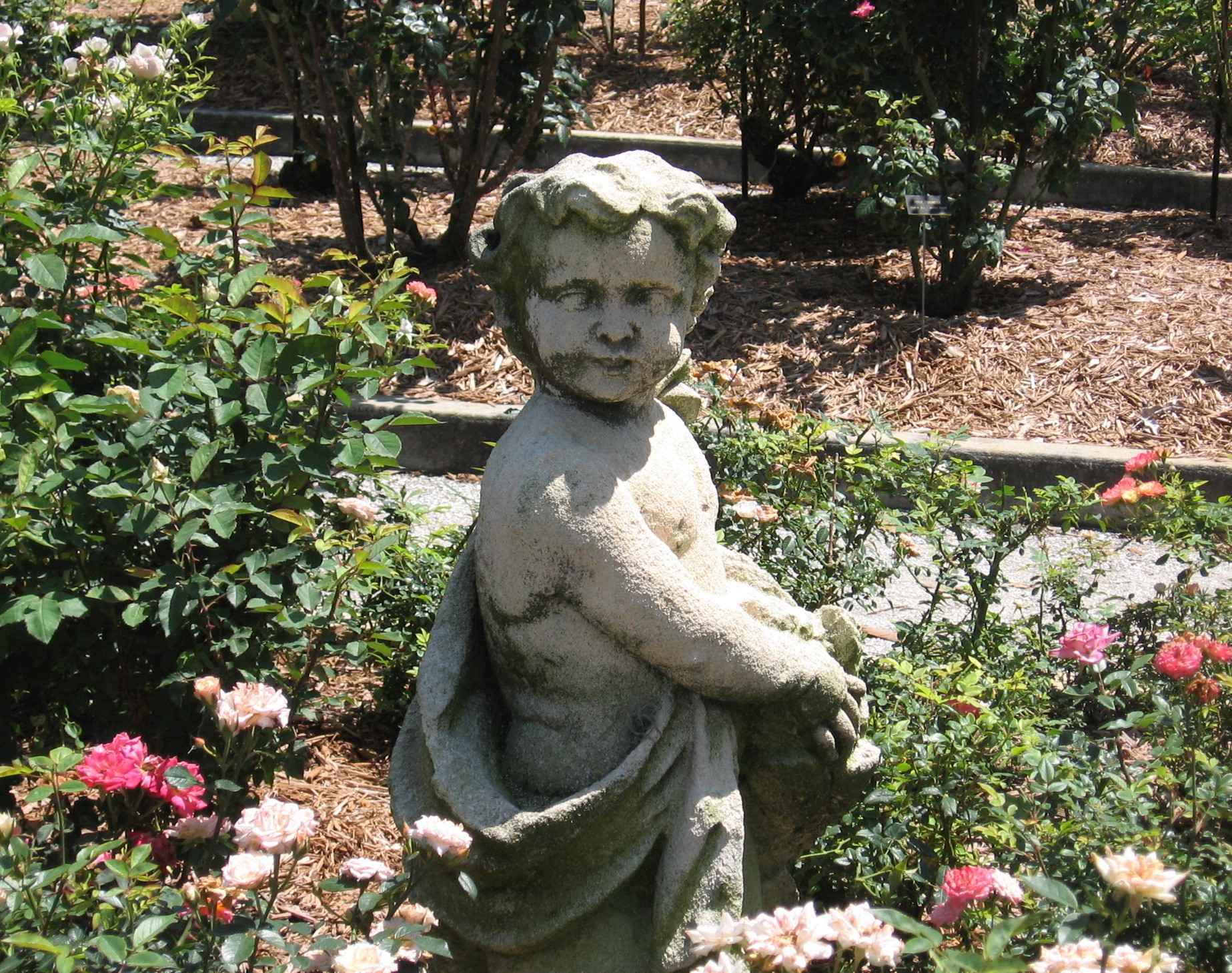
Statue in the Mable Ringling Rose Garden

The Ringling Art Library is one of the largest art reference libraries in the southeastern United States. Though it has been a part of the Ringling Museum of Art since its opening in 1946, the library gained a permanent home and reading room in 2007. The library was originally located inside one of the two late 19th-century interiors designed by Richard Morris Hunt, in gallery 20, the Astor Gallery (originally the oak-paneled library of John Jacob Astor). The first 500 books were art books that John Ringling bequeathed to the state of Florida. The collection of nearly 90,000 volumes includes some 800 books originally owned by John Ringling himself and the collection of the Ringling's first director, A. Everett Austin Jr. The collection covers the 16th–21st centuries and topics like fine and decorative art, art history, architecture, fashion, and theater. The library contains 70,000 items including a collection of rare books from the 16th century to the present, collections of European art (especially Renaissance and Baroque, favorites of John Ringling), Asian art, studio glass, circus history and culture, 60,000 books and other materials spanning the entire history of art and architecture, and hundreds of specialized art databases. It even contains a facsimile of the Gutenberg Bible, gifted to John Ringling by a German rare book collector.

The purpose of the library is to "support research and interpretation of the Museum's permanent collections, to meet the needs of the professional Museum staff, and to support the educational and administrative goals of The Ringling Center for the Cultural Arts and The John and Mable Ringling Museum of Art." Library staff work daily with educators, the circus museum, Ca' d'Zan, curators of the Museum of Art, and the exhibition preparator. The Ringling Center for the Cultural Arts was formed in 2000. Florida State University now stands as an umbrella over the Ringling Museum and the Asolo Center for the Performing Arts, further uniting the visual and performing arts. The library showcases John Ringling's love for Baroque art, Italian and Northern Old Masters not only in the collection it boasts but also in the Italian villa-like museum designed to house it. It is unknown if John Ringling intended to have a formal library on the grounds of the art museum, as the library came to be after his passing. It was only in 1946 that the State of Florida assumed ownership of his book collection, which was stored in the Astor Library. It remained there for over twenty years and moved to the third floor of the wing in 1966. It remains there to this day. A new spacious library is being planned by Florida State University, with John Ringling's book collection being honored in its own room. This private room will consist of shelving and exhibition cases to showcase highlights of Ringling's collection.

The library hosts a free book club, the Literati Book Club, which discusses famous authors and art history. Each month, the Literati Book Club offers two meetings at which the same book is discussed: one meeting in the evening, and another in the morning. As of 2021 and until further notice, the Literati Book Club is meeting via Zoom. Other regular events include a Saturday for Educators Workshop series designed to enhance educators' understanding of The Ringling's collections and special exhibitions, while also providing an opportunity for networking, collaboration, and inspiration. The Ringling Art Library also hosts an online blog. The library is open to the public and there is a reading room for patrons to view and use materials; however, the collection is non-circulating and items cannot be checked out.

The Art Library maintains a large digital image collection of items within Special Collections through Flickr. The library is a non-circulating research library. The library has open stacks, and visitors may browse through the collection and enjoy the materials in the library's reading room. As a part of Florida State University libraries, researchers at the Ringling have access to an ebook library, scholarly databases, and curated research guides. The library is one of the 11 libraries of the Florida State University Library system. It is also one of the largest and most comprehensive art research libraries in the southeastern United States. The collection is also searchable through the FSU Libraries Catalog. Admission to the library is free and open to the public on weekdays, from 1–5.

=== The Secret Garden ===
In 1991, John, Mable, and his sister, Ida Ringling North, were buried on the property just in front and to the right of the Ca' d'Zan. It is called the Secret Garden, and John is buried between the two women. A locked gate encloses the three graves and tombstones, with a garden and statues situated in front of the gate. During visiting hours, the gate is unlocked and opened. On the anniversary of John Ringling's birthday, neighboring New College students often sneak in and place a cigar on his grave.

== See also ==
- Circus World Museum
- Ringling International Arts Festival
