= Tibbals =

Tibbals is an English patronymic surname. Notable people with the surname include:

- Chauntelle Tibbals, American sociologist
- Howard C. Tibbals (1936–2022), American artist
- Todd Tibbals (1910–1988), American architect
