= Bill Schultz =

Bill or William Schultz may refer to:

- Bill Schultz (American football) (born 1967), American retired football player
- Bill Schultz (producer) (born 1960), American television producer
- William Henry Victor Schultz (born 1997), American rapper better known as Sueco
- Bill Schultz (Fender) (1926–2006), CEO of Fender Musical Instruments Corporation
- Bill Schultz (rugby league, born 1891) (1891–1975), Australian rugby league footballer
- William Schultz (rugby league) (1938–2015), known as Bill, New Zealand rugby league footballer
- William L. Schultz (1923–2009), American circus performer, teacher, and writer
- Captain Willy Schultz, a comic book character

== See also ==
- William Schulz (disambiguation), including Bill Schulz
