= William L. Schultz =

American circus performer (1923–2009)

William L. (Bill) Schultz
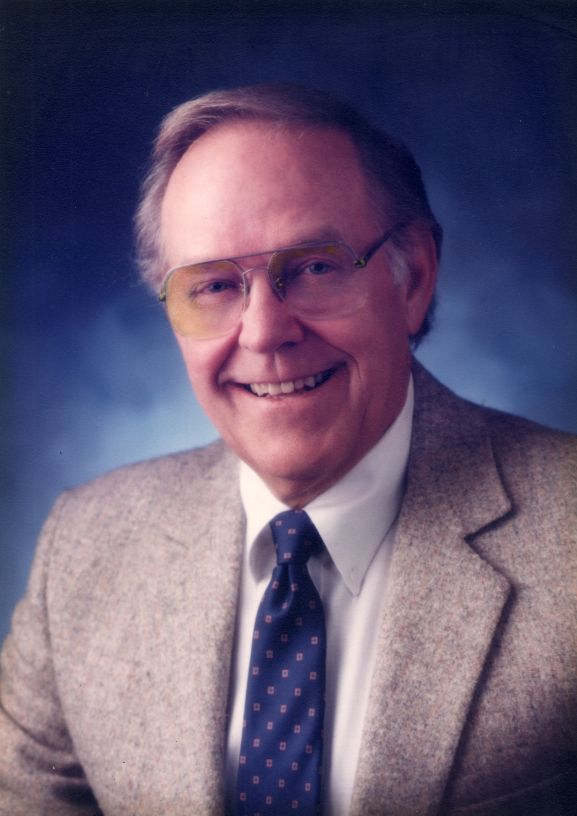
- Born: November 25, 1923; Manitowoc, Wisconsin, US
- Died: June 7, 2009 (aged 85); Manitowoc, Wisconsin, US
- Occupation(s): Circus performer; Circus World Museum Director; YMCA Director
- Known for: National Paddleball Champion; National Racquetball Champion; Director of the Chicago Great Circus Parade; Wisconsin Racquetball Association Hall of Fame

William 'Bill' L. Schultz (November 25, 1923 – June 7, 2009) was a late 20th century American circus performer (acrobat and flying trapeze artist), national paddleball champion, national racquetball champion, U.S. Marine, Big Time wrestler, the youngest executive director of the YMCA, and poet. He also sparred with John Wayne and other Hollywood celebrities.

== Early life ==
William 'Bill' L. Schultz was born in 1923 in Manitowoc, Wisconsin, USA into his father, William ('Billy', 'Lester') Schultz's Circus. Born into a circus family, Schultz developed into an acrobat and all-around athlete. Following high school and one year at the University of Wisconsin (UW), he enlisted in the Marine Corps in 1942. He became a Marine Champion in boxing and wrestling, later touring and performing alongside professional athletes and Hollywood stars at War Bond shows throughout the United States.

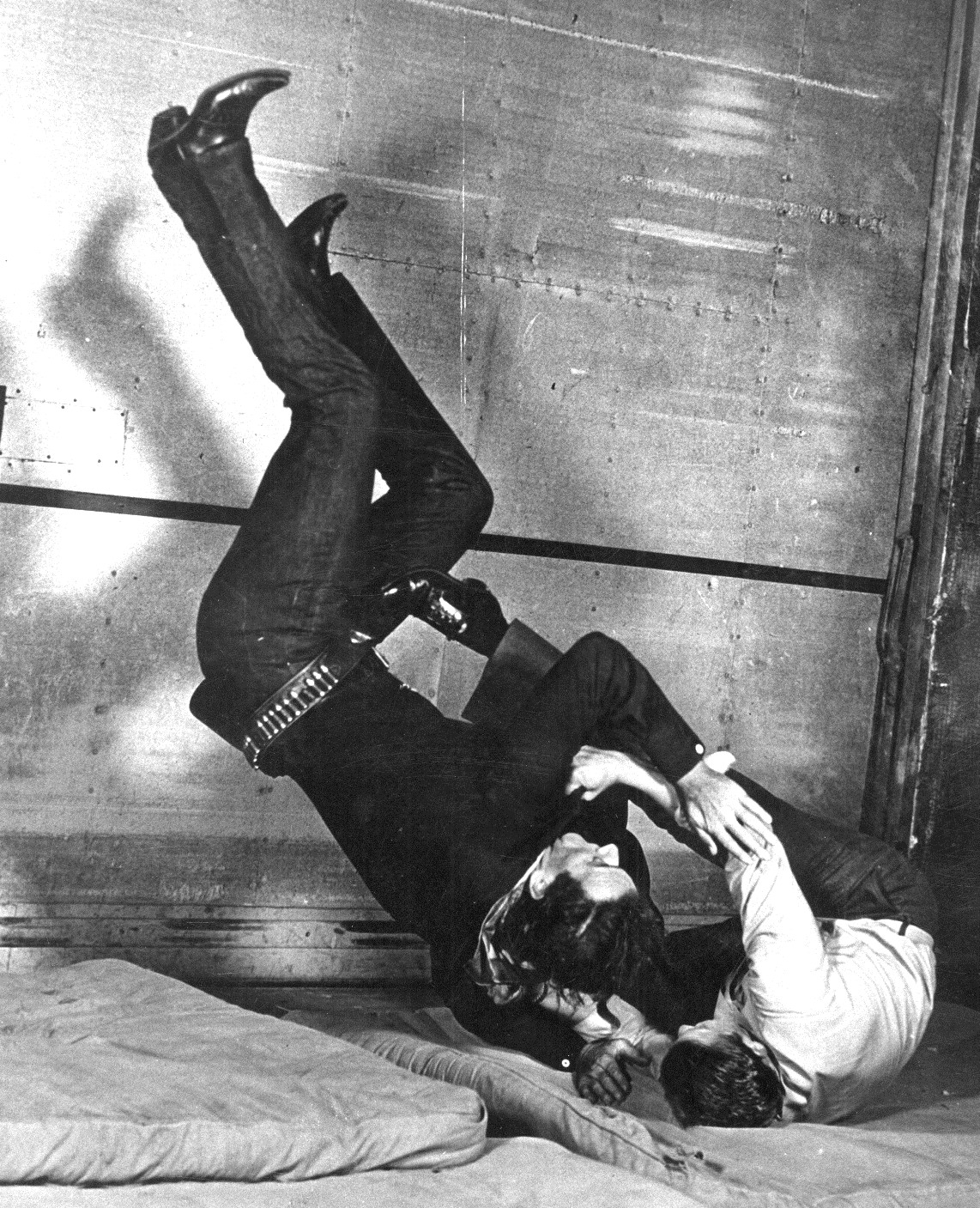
Bill Schultz grapples with John Wayne (1943, Hollywood)

== Education and YMCA career ==
Following the war, Schultz returned to the University of Wisconsin and earned a Bachelor's degree and Master's degree in Physical Education. During this time, he served as captain of the Gymnastics Team and earned the title of Big Ten Champion on the flying rings. Schultz performed in the half-time shows of UW football and basketball games, entertaining fans with cartwheels on the fifty-yard line and handstands in the rafters of the old Field House. Subsequently, Schultz turned down an offer to perform with the Ringling Brothers and Barnum & Bailey Circus, instead beginning a career with the YMCA. He served as Physical Director of the Madison (Wisconsin, USA) YMCA in 1949, and later became the youngest YMCA executive director in the country (Keokuk, IA). During his career, he traveled to build many YMCAs, while becoming a national champion in Paddleball in 1962 and Racquetball in 1968.

== Circus World and Circus Parades ==
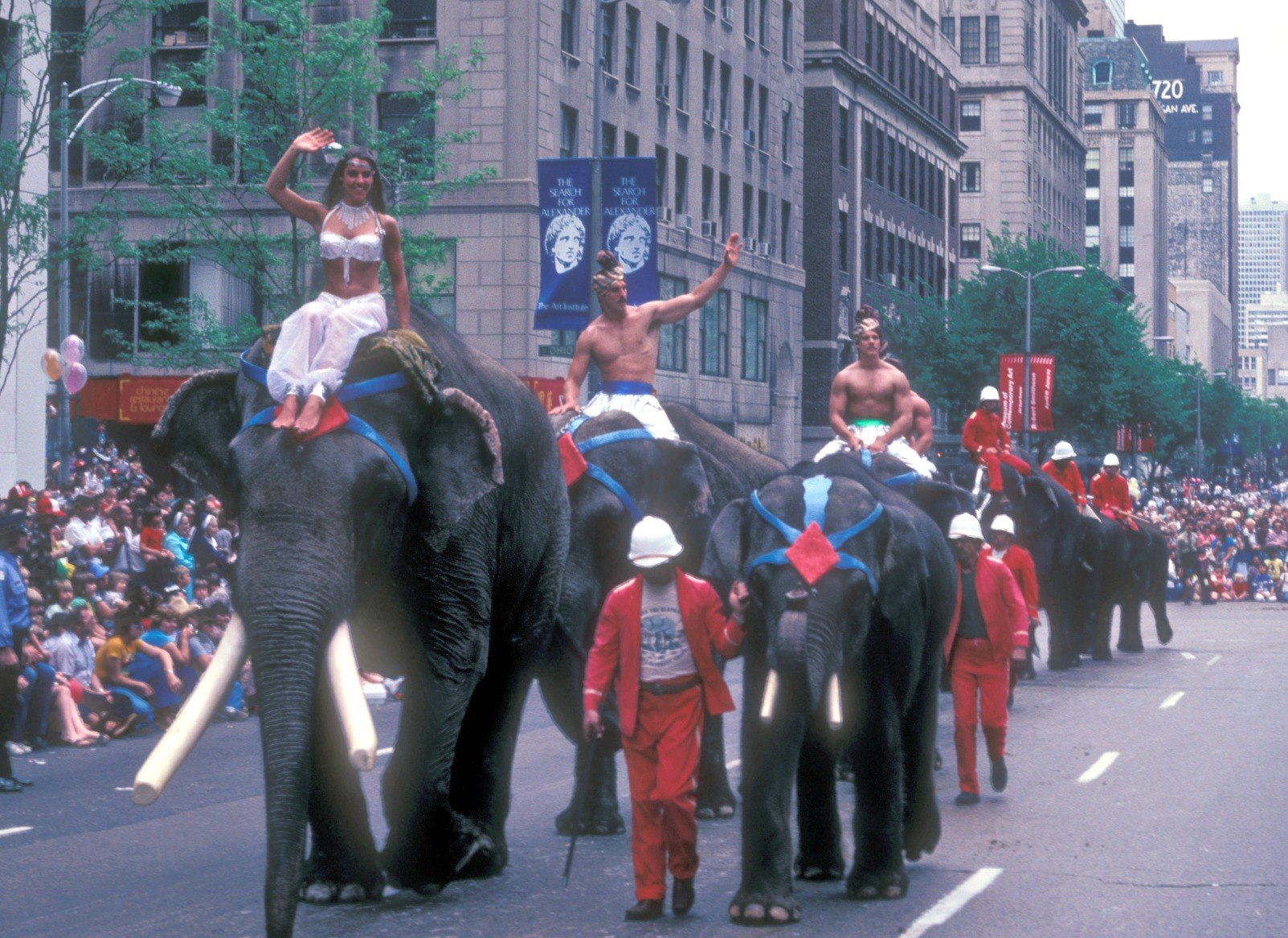
The Chicago Circus Parade (1982)

Going home to his circus roots, Schultz became Executive Director of the Circus World Museum in Baraboo (Wisconsin) in 1972. During the next 12 years, he developed the Museum and Library to become the state's leading attraction. In 1980, Schultz brought the Great Circus Parade and 100,000 visitors to the streets of Baraboo. In 1981 and 1982 he staged the largest Circus Parade in the world for the city of Chicago. The Chicago Circus Parade was attended by over one million spectators lining the Michigan Avenue parade route.

== Later life ==
After retiring from the circus in 1984, Schultz became a substitute teacher, teaching throughout Wisconsin. In 1993 Schultz wrote and illustrated The Joy of Remembering, a book summarizing his philosophical and practical reflections on life. He promoted the book with talks throughout the country. Subsequently, Schultz wrote and self-published The Alphabet of Life, a book that shared a lesson on life for each letter of the alphabet. Between 1992 and 1997, Schultz wrote his memoirs, titled My Life.

In 2004, Schultz was one of four inaugural inductees into the Wisconsin Racquetball Association Hall of Fame. Following Schultz's death in 2009, his memoirs were published as Bill Schultz: Ringmaster of Sport.

== Books authored by William L Schultz ==
- Schultz, William L. The Joy of Remembering. Madison, Wis: Fox Point Pub, 1993.
- Schultz, William L. The Alphabet of Life. Madison, Wis: Point Pub. Co, 1998.
- My Life (1997)
- Bill Schultz: Ringmaster of Sport (2016)
