= Chappie Fox =

American writer

Charles Philip "Chappie" Fox (May 27, 1913 – September 12, 2003) was a circus historian and philanthropist born in Milwaukee, Wisconsin, who greatly expanded the Circus World Museum and helped found the Great Circus Parade in Milwaukee.

Fox took over the tiny museum, in Baraboo, Wisconsin, in 1960, and began to collect and restore antique circus wagons. These wooden wagons had been built in the late 19th and early 20th century, and lay in disrepair across the United States and Europe. Today, the museum owns over 200 of these wagons.

In 1963, Fox and Ben Barkin, under the sponsorship of the Schlitz Brewing Company, began the Great Circus Parade.

A self-trained circus historian, Fox wrote and edited many books about circus animals, advertising and imagery, and also authored many children's stories. He died of heart disease at a nursing home in Baraboo and is survived by his wife Sophie and daughter, Barbara Fox McKellar.

== Bibliography ==
=== Circus history ===
- Circus parades, a pictorial history of America's greatest pageant, Watkins Glen, N.Y., Century House, 1953.
- A ticket to the circus; a pictorial history of the incredible Ringlings, Seattle : Superior, 1959.
- A pictorial history of performing horses., Seattle, Superior, 1960.
- The circus comes to town. Milwaukee, Inland Press, c1963.
- The circus in America (with Tom Parkinson). Waukesha, Wis., Country Beautiful, 1969.
- American circus posters in full color (editor). New York : Dover, 1978. ISBN 0-486-23693-5.
- The great circus street parade in pictures (with F. Beverly Kelley). New York : Dover, c1978. ISBN 0-486-23571-8.
- Old-time circus cuts : a pictorial archive of 202 illustrations (editor). New York : Dover, 1979. ISBN 0-486-23653-6.
- Circus baggage stock, a tribute to the Percheron horse. Boulder, Colo. : Pruett, c1983. ISBN 0-87108-625-5.
- Billers, banners, and bombast: the story of circus advertising (with Tom Parkinson). Boulder, Colo. : Pruett, c1985. ISBN 0-87108-609-3.
- Horses in harness (edited by Jean Van Dyke). Greendale, WI : Reiman, c1987. ISBN 0-89821-080-1.
- The great circus street parade in pictures (with F. Beverly Kelly, 2nd ed.). New York : Dover, 1990. ISBN 0-486-26201-4.
- America's great circus parade: its roots, its revival, its revelry. Greendale, WI : Reiman, c1993.
- Horse drawn wagon collection at the Circus World Museum, Baraboo, Wisconsin (editor). Milwaukee : Great Circus Parade, c1994.
- The circus in America (with Tom Parkinson). Santa Monica, CA: Hennessey & Ingalls, 2002. ISBN 0-940512-33-5.

=== Children's books ===
- Frisky, try again. Chicago, Reilly & Lee, 1959
- Come to the circus. Chicago, Reilly & Lee, 1960.
- A fox in the house. Chicago : Reilly & Lee, 1960.
- Mr. Stripes the gopher. Chicago, Reilly & Lee, 1962.
- Birds will come to you. Chicago : Reilly & Lee, 1963.
- Mr. Duck's big day. Chicago, Reilly & Lee, 1963.
- Snowball, the trick pony. Chicago, Reilly & Lee, 1964.
- When autumn comes. Chicago, Reilly & Lee, c1966.
- Opie Possum's trick. Chicago, Reilly & Lee, 1968.
- Sweet Sue's adventures (story by Sam Campbell). Brushton, N.Y. : TEACH Services, c2002. ISBN 1-57258-210-3.
