= William Schulz =

William or Bill Schulz may refer to:

- William R. Schulz (born 1931), American politician
- Bill Schulz (editor) (William Martin Schulz, 1939–2019), American conservative journalist and editor
- William F. Schulz (born 1949), American human rights activist
- Bill Schulz (television personality) (William Dawes Schulz, born 1975), American journalist, writer, and television personality

== See also ==
- William Schultz (disambiguation)
- William T. Schulte (1890–1966), American politician
- William Schutz (1925–2002), American psychologist
