= The Howard Bros. Circus =

Circus replica in Sarasota, Florida, USA

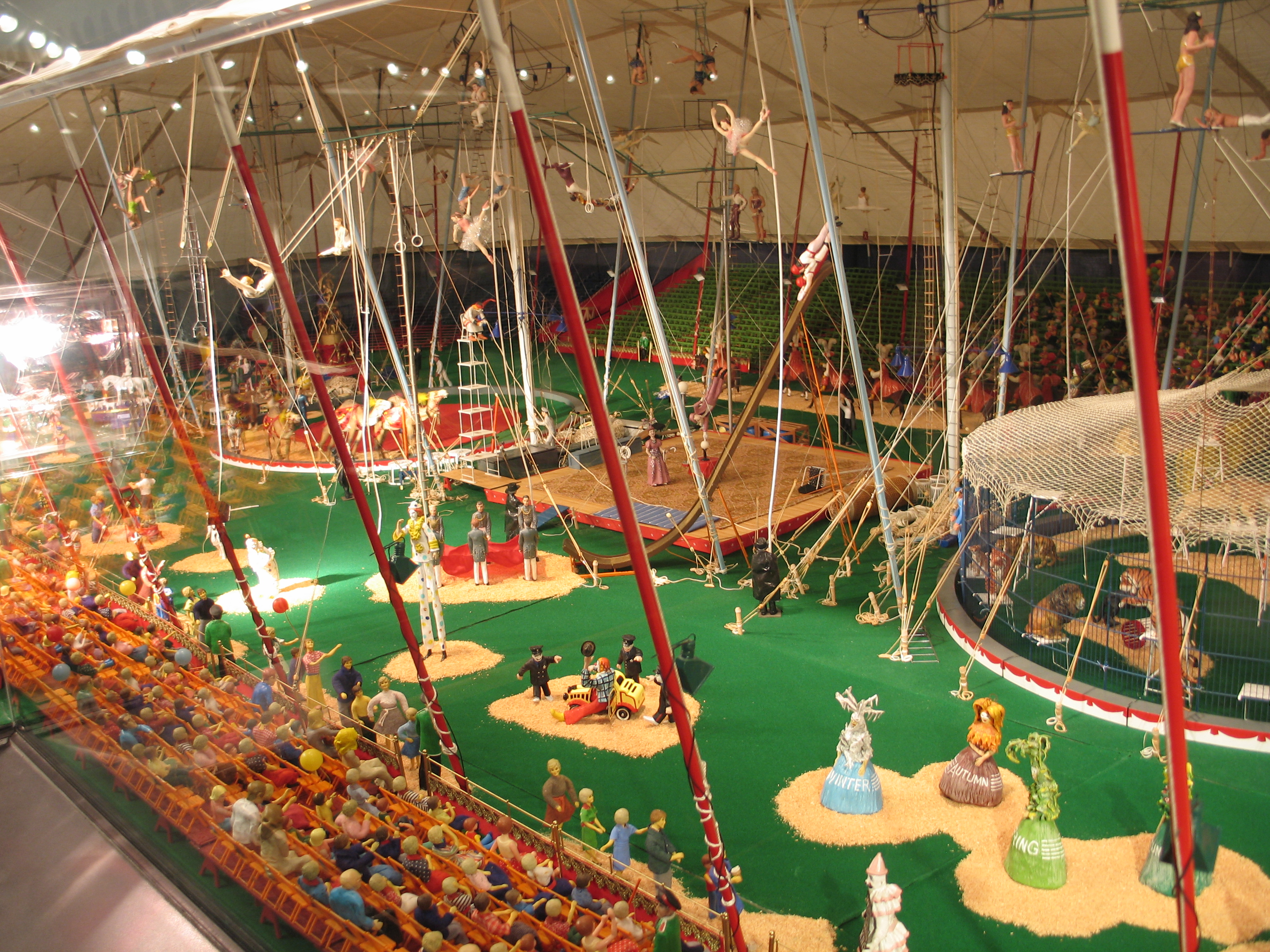

The Howard Bros. Circus is a ¾-inch-to-the-foot scale replica of Ringling Bros. and Barnum & Bailey Circus located on the Ringling Estate in Sarasota, Florida. It includes a complete reproduction of the entire circus (circa the 1920s).

== History ==
The name for the circus comes from the name of the creator, Howard C. Tibbals. Tibbals asked Ringling management if he could use their name for his circus when he started building it, but they refused. So he called it The Howard Bros. Circus instead. There never was a full-scale Howard Bros. Circus.

Tibbals began toying with circuses in 1943, at the age of 7. At 12 he was given a lathe and jigsaw, which advanced his model building. Tibbals started working on the model in earnest in 1956. Much of the circus was completed by 1974, but it did not premiere until the 1982 World's Fair in Knoxville, Tennessee. In 2004, Tibbals set up the circus at its current location in the Ringling Estate's Tibbals Learning Center, which includes a full-scale replica of Tibbals's workshop. It took Tibbals over one year to set up the circus in its current location.

== Gallery ==
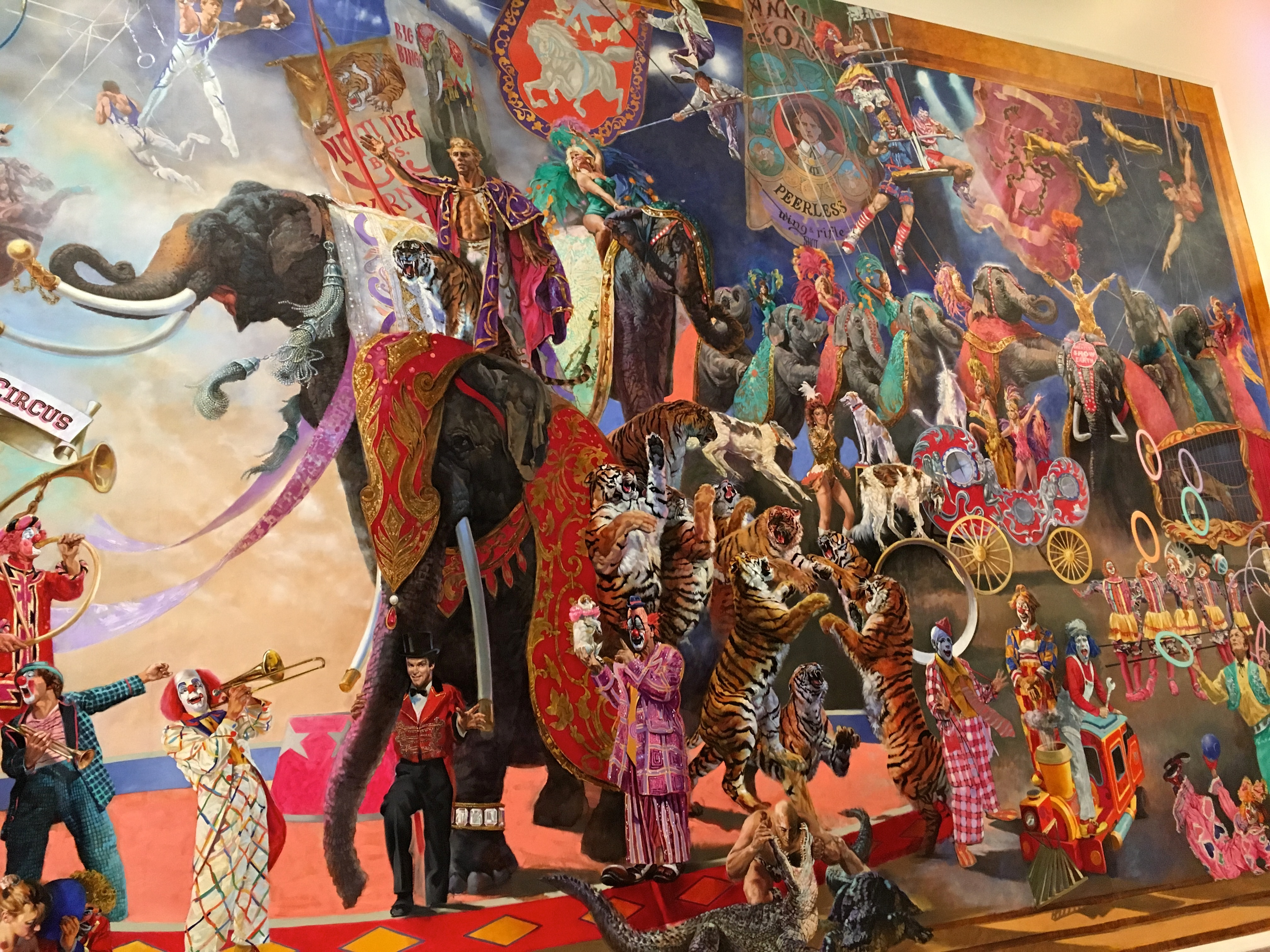
Mural at the Tibbals Learning Center

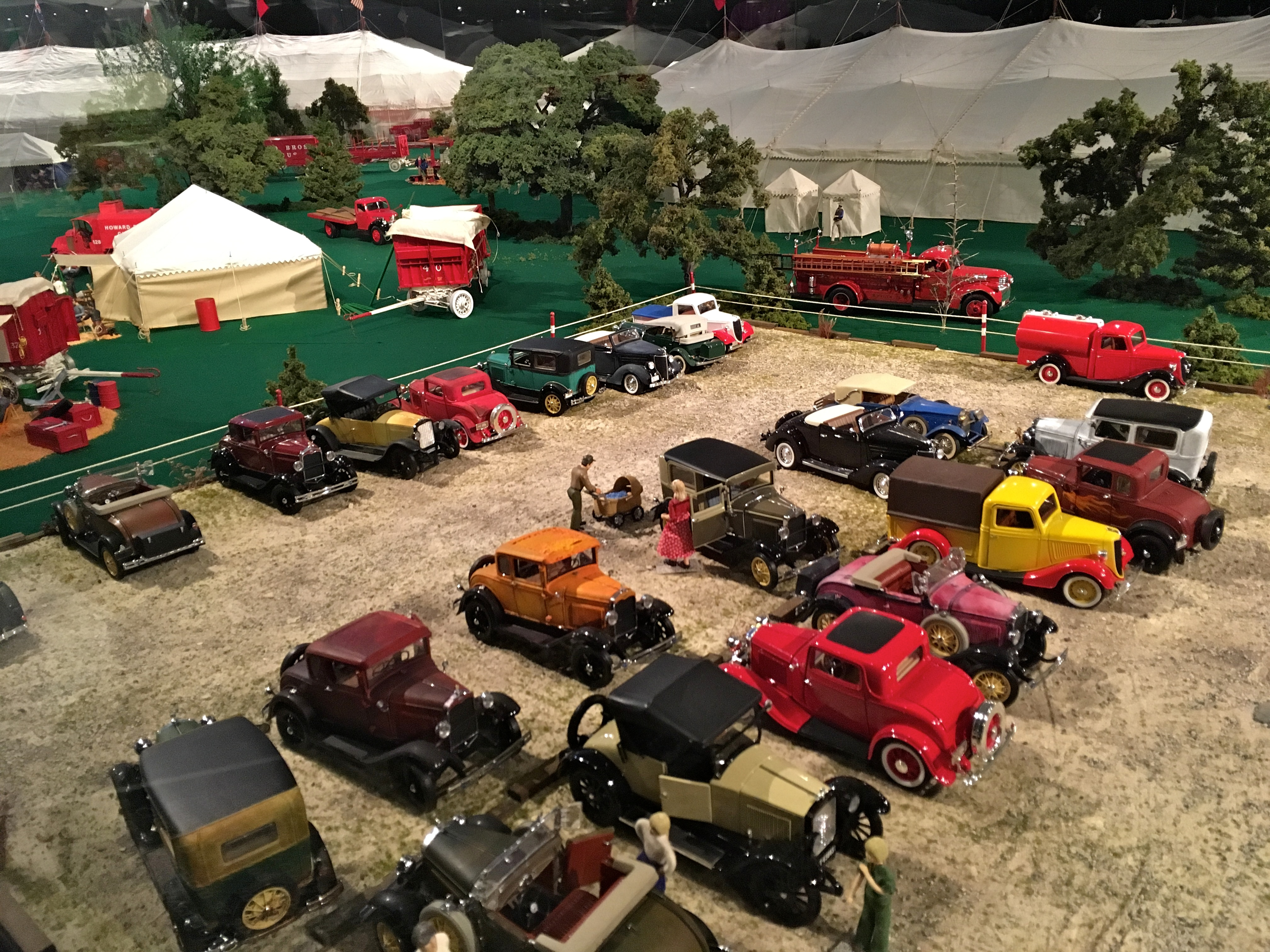
Patron parking space

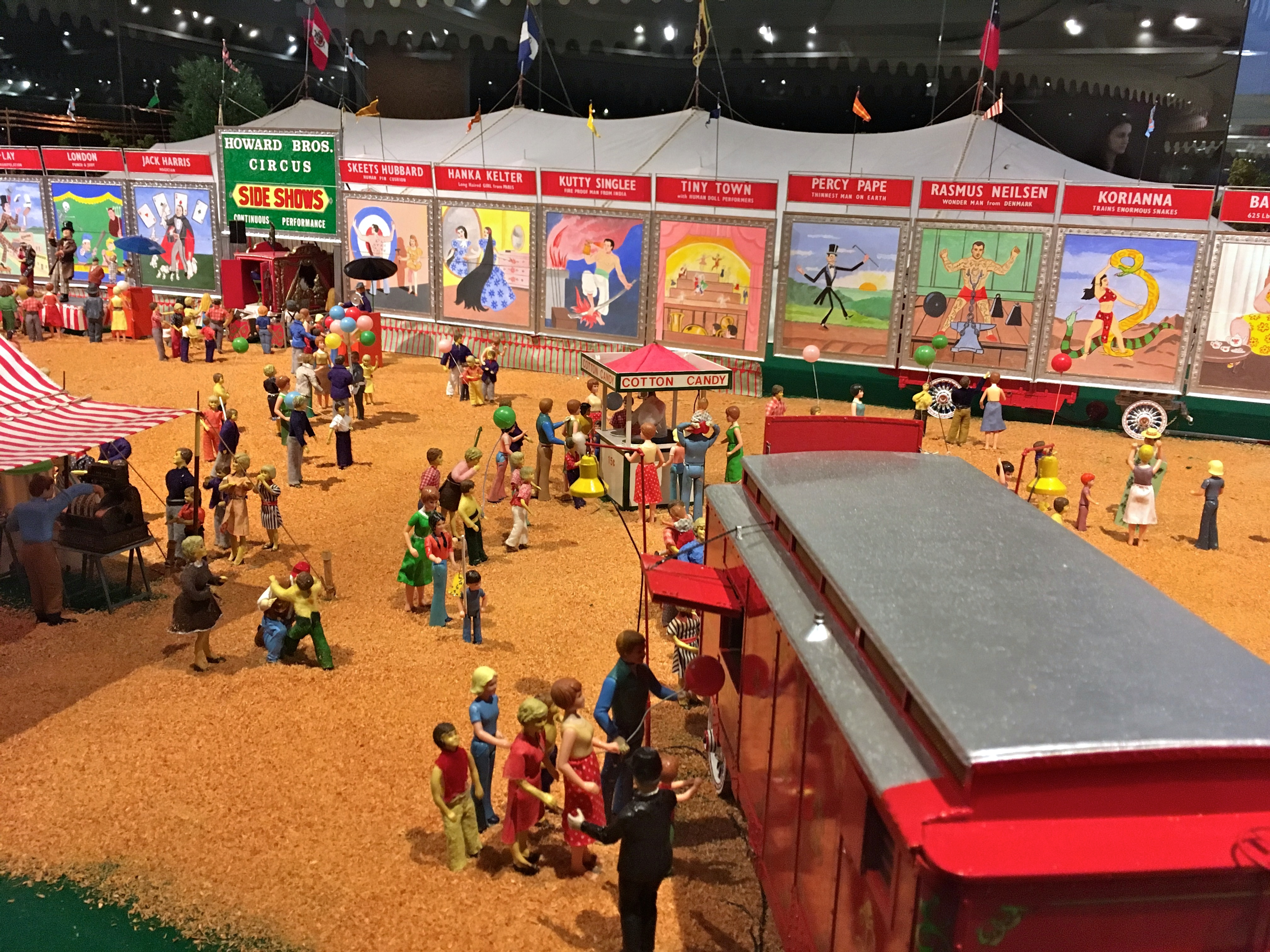
Side shows

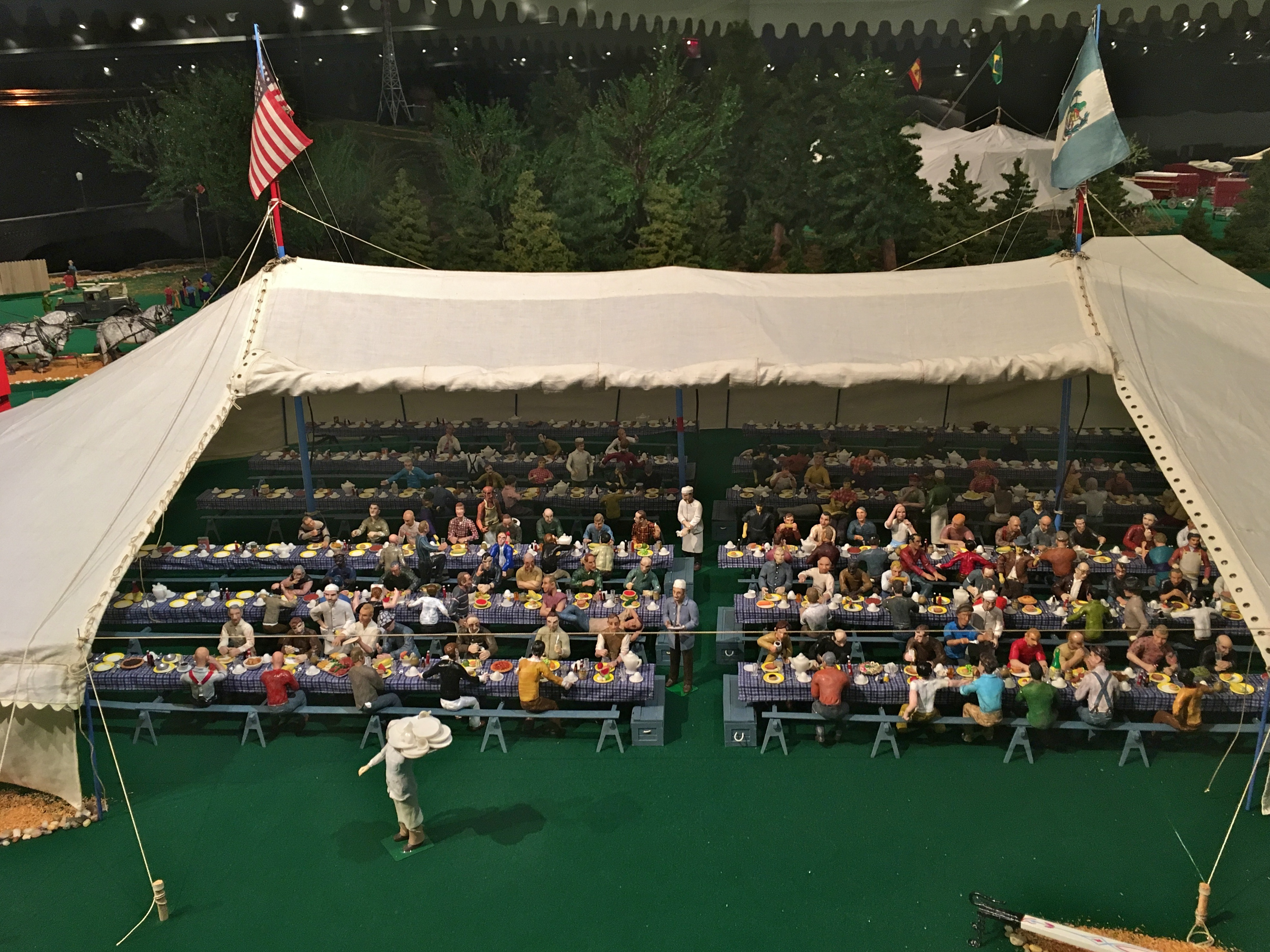
Mess tent

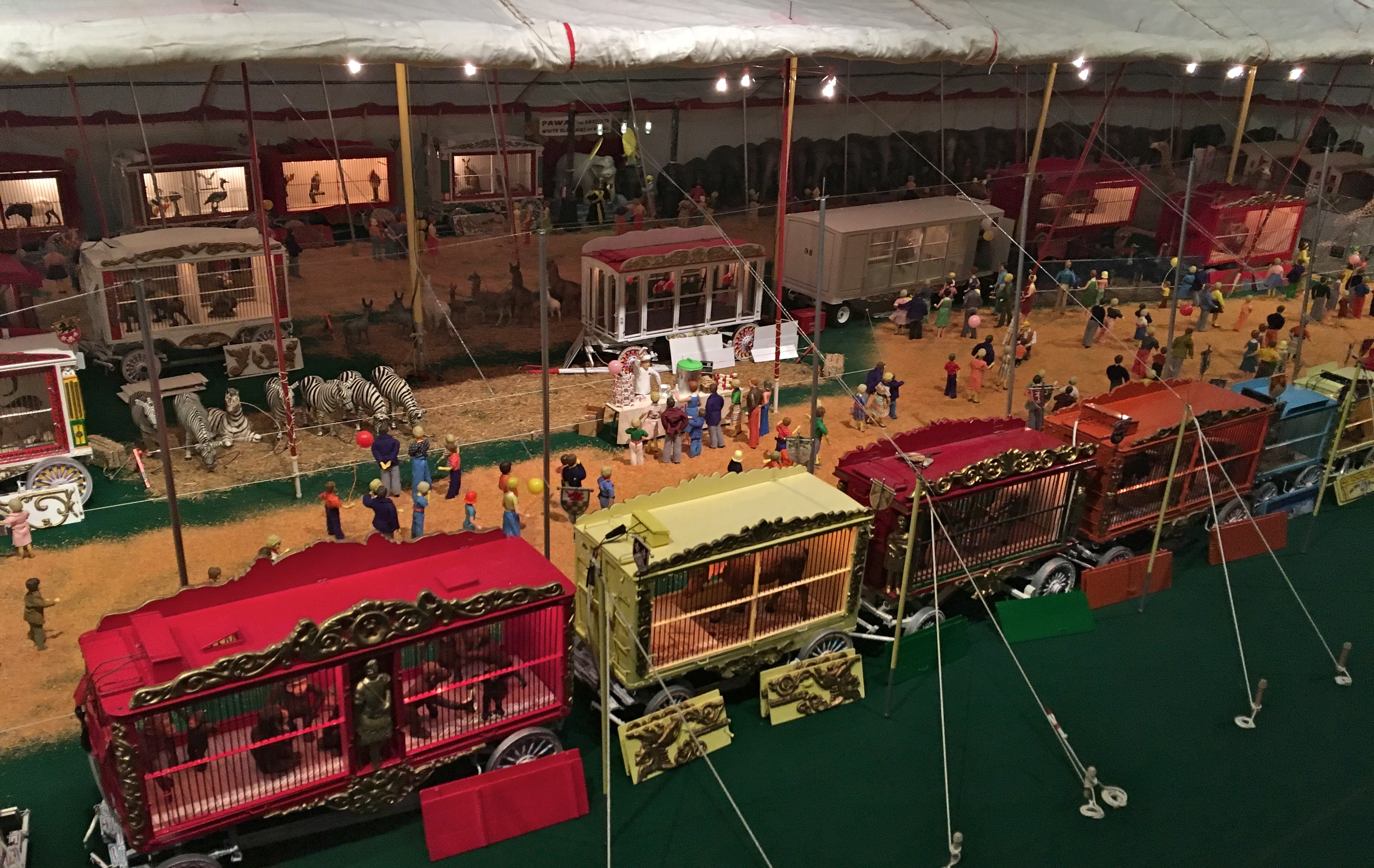
Menagerie tent
