= Niccolò De Simone =

Italian painter

Niccolò De Simone, also called Nicolò Fiammingo, Lo Zet, or Lopet, (c. 1600 - c. 1677) was a Flemish painter, active during 1636–1654 in Naples, Kingdom of Naples. He was born in Liège. His style suggests he was in the circle or influenced by Jusepe de Ribera, Massimo Stanzione, Bernardo Cavallino, and Mattia Preti. Bernardo de' Dominici claims he was also painting in Spain and Portugal. A painting attributed to Simone is found in the John and Mable Ringling Museum of Art.

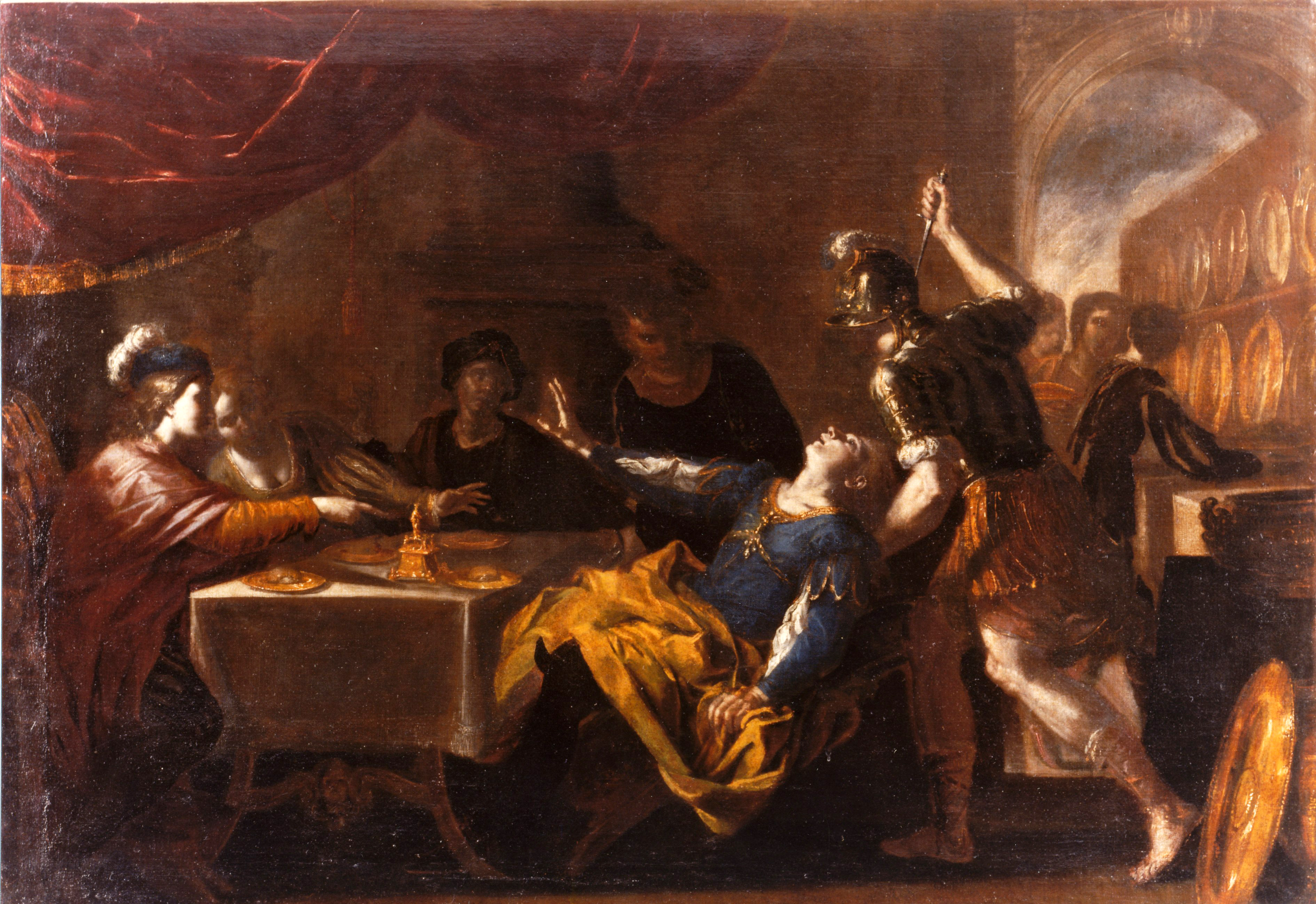
Banquet of Absalom
