= Great Circus Parade =

American marching band and circus parade

Coordinates: 43°02′25.5″N 87°53′56.2″W

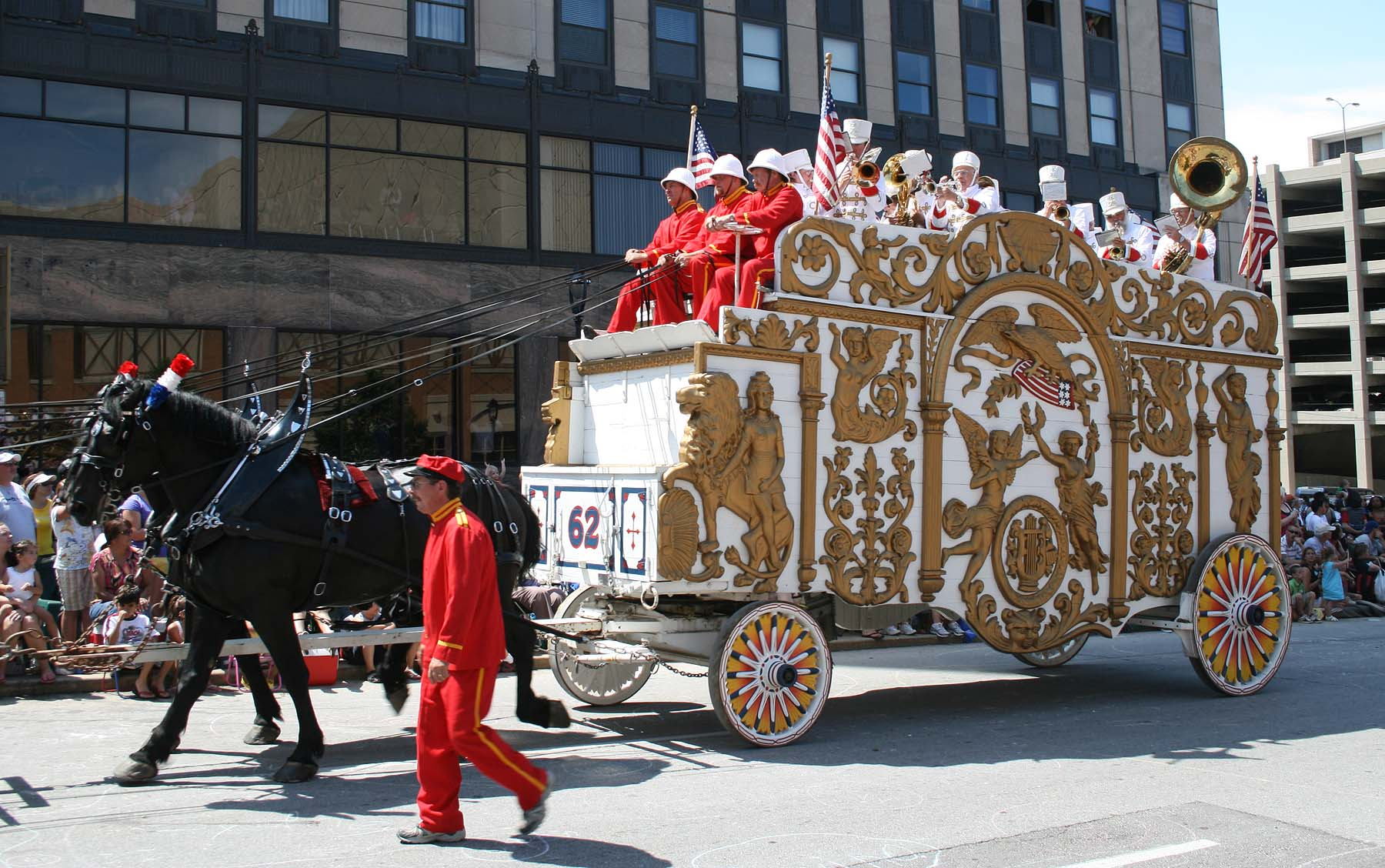
A bandwagon in the 2009 parade

The Great Circus Parade is a parade of marching bands, circus wagons, clowns, performers, and animals. Between 1963 and 2009, it has been held 30 times in Milwaukee, Wisconsin, and a few times in Chicago and Baraboo, Wisconsin. A fundraiser for the Circus World Museum, the parade typically draws hundreds of thousands of attendees. The parade recreates how people in the late 19th century and early 20th century gathered along stops on a circus's route to see whether a circus was worth viewing.

== Exhibits ==
The parade features circus wagons and animals from the Circus World Museum in Baraboo, Wisconsin and marching bands from Wisconsin. The animals and wagons travel from Baraboo to the parade locale on special circus trains. Baraboo is the original 1884 home of the Ringling Brothers Circus.

The 2009 parade exhibited 50 circus wagons, between 250 and 400 horses, and 30 bands on a two-hour long route. The chief parade clown, Ernest Borgnine, commented that he saw "nothing but miles and miles of smiles."

== History ==
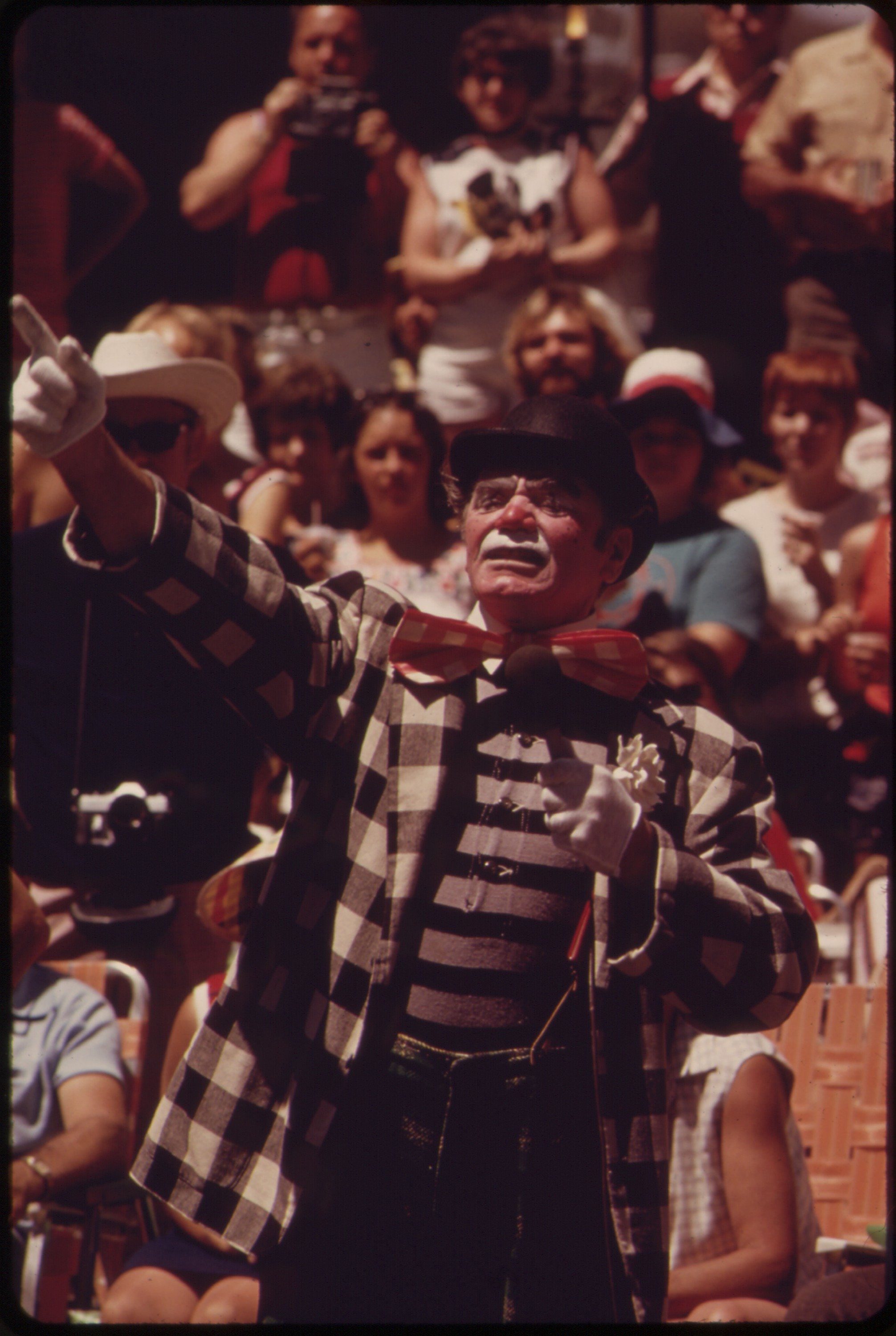
Ernest Borgnine, emcee, 1973

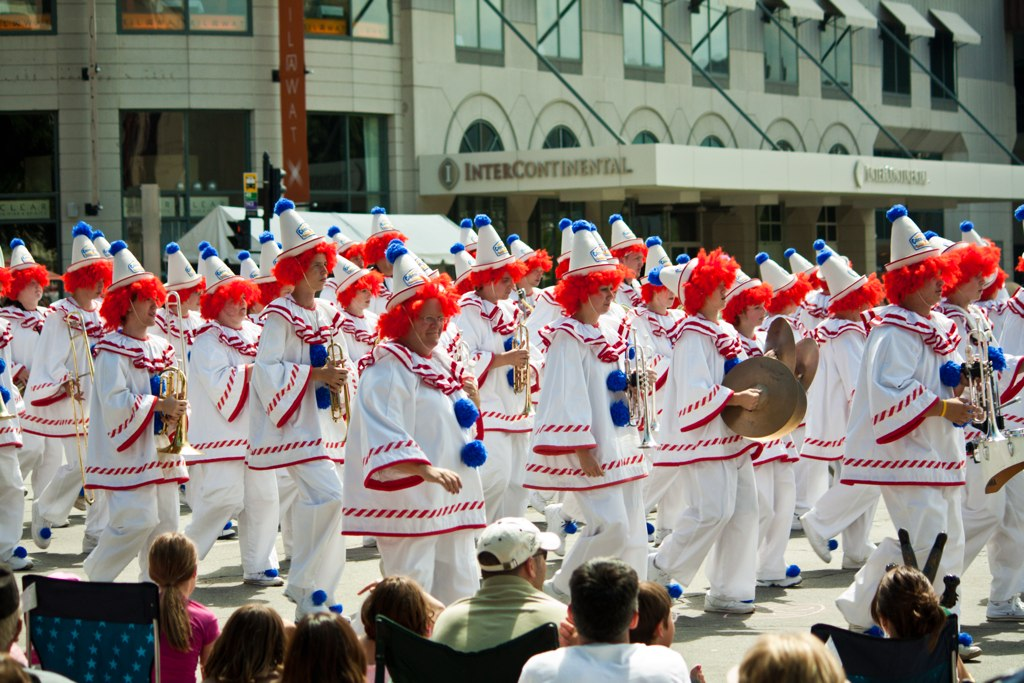
A marching band dressed as clowns

The Great Circus Parade was founded by Chappie Fox and Ben Barkin and first held in Milwaukee in 1963. It continued annually in Milwaukee until 1973. Between 1980 and 2005, it was held in Milwaukee, Chicago or Baraboo, Wisconsin. No parade was held between 2006 and 2008.

The parade resumed in 2009, returning to Milwaukee on July 12, after a six-year hiatus, after organizers raised $1.5 million. The 2009 parade celebrated the 50th anniversary of the Circus World Museum. The animals and wagons were on display at Veteran’s Park in Milwaukee for several days before the parade. The parade followed a 3.4-mile (5.5 km) course from Milwaukee’s lakefront on Lake Michigan through Milwaukee’s downtown. The founder's nephew, Bill Fox, helped raise funds for the 2009 event, and he expects the event to be held every two to three years to allow time for fund raising.

== See also ==
- Showman's wagons
