= Howard C. Tibbals =

American sculptor (1936–2022)

Howard Charles Tibbals (August 10, 1936 – March 20, 2022) was the artist and sculptor who created The Howard Bros. Circus, a 3/4-inch-to-one-foot scale replica of the Ringling Bros. and Barnum & Bailey Circus. The replica is now located on the Ringling Estate, in Sarasota, FL.

Tibbals was born in 1936. He saw his first circus at age 3. In 1943 he watched the circus unload from trains and began playing circus. For his 12th birthday, in 1948, he was given a lathe and jigsaw, which he used in his model building. Tibbals begin creating the circus's big top in 1956. He built his first circus wagon in 1959 (wagon #40). Most of the circus was completed in 1974, but it was not premiered until 1982, at the World's Fair in Knoxville, TN. As of 2004, the entire circus is on display at the Ringling Estate, in Sarasota, FL.

Howard Tibbals died on March 20, 2022, at his home in Sarasota, Florida.
