= Circus World Museum =

Museum complex in Baraboo, Wisconsin, US

- Ringling Brothers Circus Winter Headquarters
- U.S. National Register of Historic Places
- U.S. National Historic Landmark
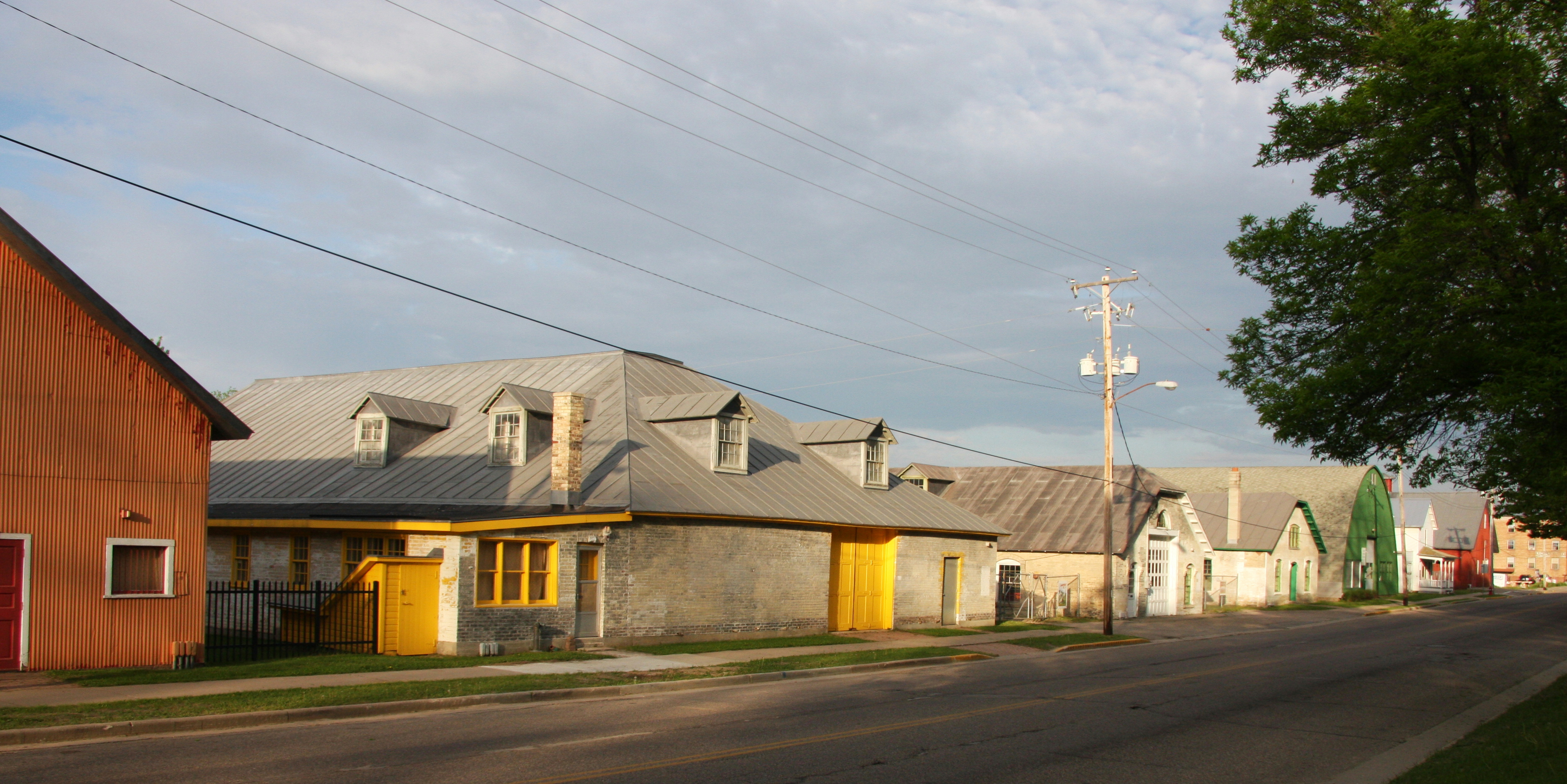
- Circus World seen from Water Street
- Location: 550 Water Street; Baraboo, Wisconsin
- Coordinates: 43.4669°N 89.7353°W
- Built: 1884
- NRHP reference No.: 69000032

Significant dates
- Added to NRHP: August 4, 1969
- Designated NHL: August 4, 1969

The Circus World Museum is a museum complex in Baraboo, Wisconsin, devoted to circus-related history. The museum features circus artifacts and exhibits and hosts daily live circus performances throughout the summer. It is owned by the Wisconsin Historical Society and operated by the non-profit Circus World Museum Foundation. The museum was the major participant in the Great Circus Parade held from 1963 to 2009.

== History ==
Circus World Museum is located in Baraboo, Wisconsin, because Baraboo was home to the Ringling Brothers. It was from Baraboo in 1884 that the Ringling Brothers Circus began their first tour as a circus. Over six seasons, the circus expanded from a wagon show to a railroad show with 225 employees, touring cities across the United States each summer. Baraboo remained the circus's headquarters and wintering grounds until 1918, when the Ringling Brothers Circus combined with the Barnum and Bailey Circus, which the Ringling Brothers had bought out in 1908. The combined entity, Ringling Bros. and Barnum & Bailey Circus, was successful until 2017 when it took its final bow on Sunday, May 21, 2017, in Uniondale, New York.

In 1954, John M. Kelley, a former attorney for the Ringling Brothers, incorporated the Circus World Museum with the intent of forming a museum of the Ringling Brothers Circus and circus history in general. By this time the popularity of circuses and other live shows was declining in favor of new media, such as television. After an initial period of organization and fundraising, the museum acquired a large site in Baraboo that included the former wintering grounds of the Ringling Brothers Circus. This site was deeded to the State Historical Society of Wisconsin (now called the Wisconsin Historical Society) to be used as the museum's location, and the Circus World Museum opened to the public on July 1, 1959.

Owned by the Wisconsin Historical Society, the museum sits on some of the land owned by the Ringlings, and includes eight of the ten remaining Ringling buildings on the grounds. Circus World Museum holds one of the largest collections of circus materials in the world, including circus wagons, posters, photography, and artifacts used by shows from all over the United States. The museum also has smaller collections of Wild West shows and carnival materials.

== Exhibits ==
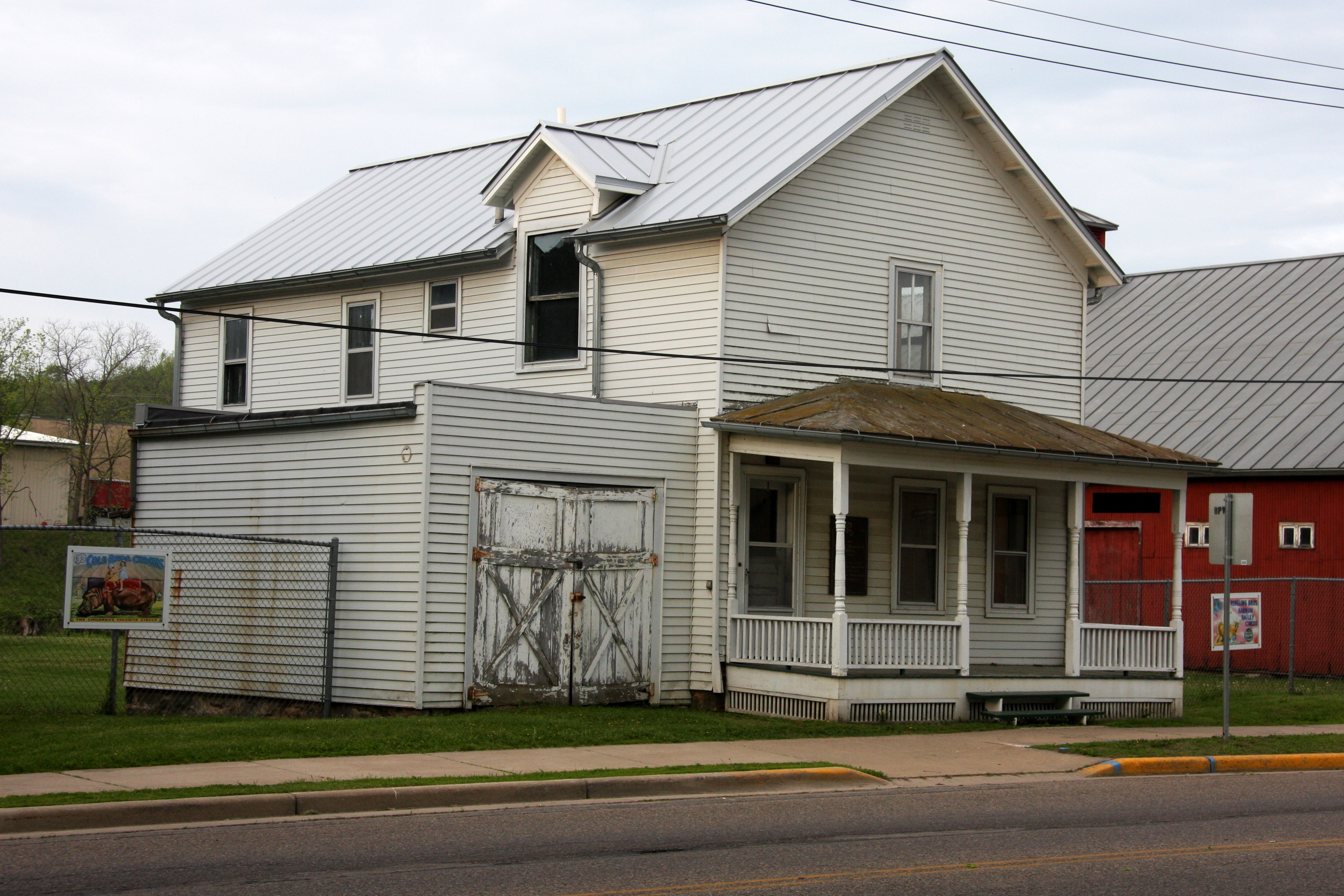
Office in Ringlingville

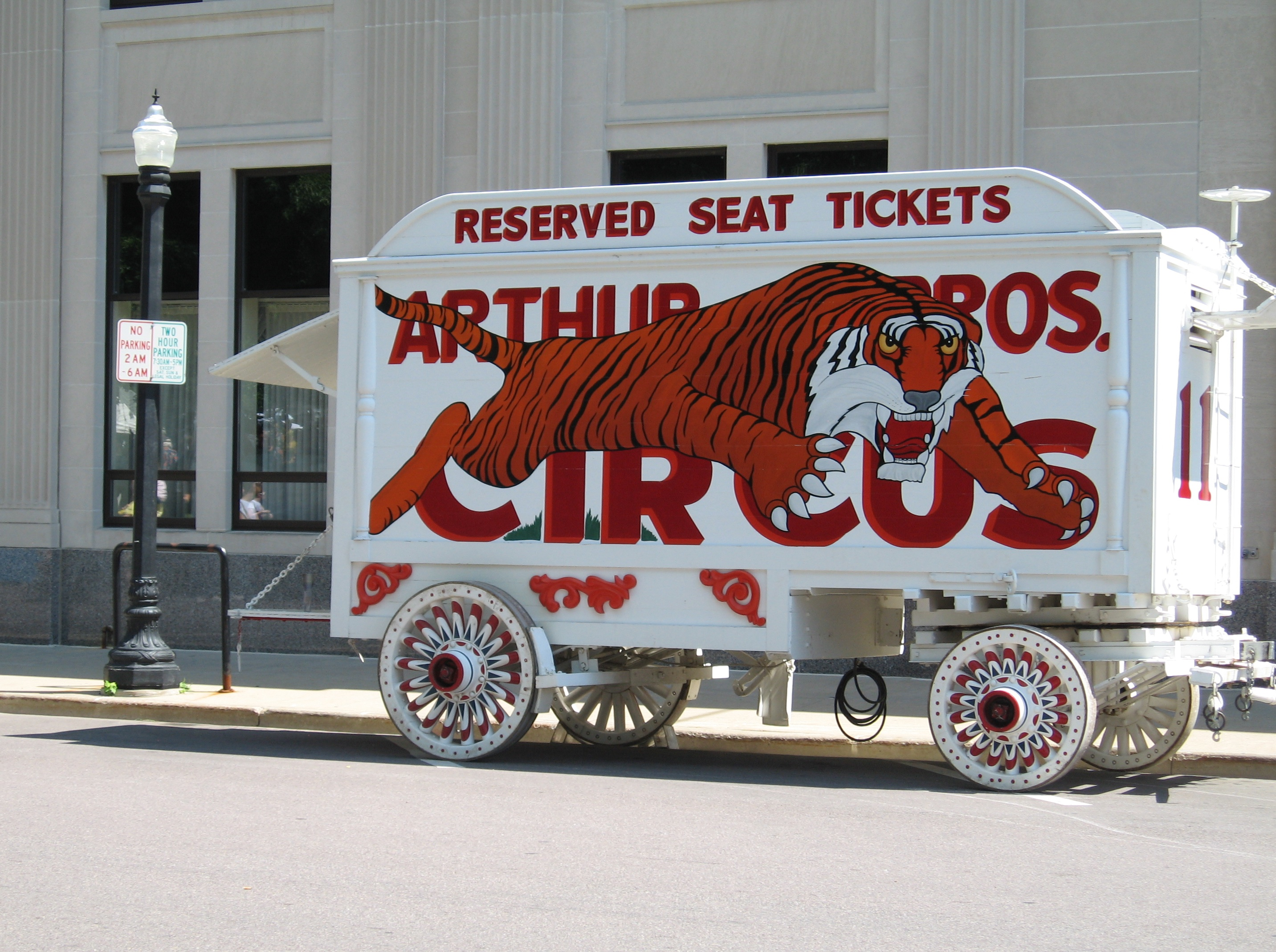
Wagon on display at Circus World Museum

Circus World Museum encompasses several buildings holding numerous exhibits on circus history.

Ringlingville consists of the remaining buildings of the original wintering grounds of the Ringling Brothers Circus, a National Historic Landmark. Buildings in Ringlingville include the Ring Barn, Elephant House, Animal House, Baggage Horse Barn, Winter Quarters Office, and Wardrobe Department. Tours of Ringlingville present information on the history of the Ringling Brothers Circus, as well as offering behind-the-scenes glimpses into the efforts taken by the circus while preparing for shows.

The Irvin Feld Exhibit Hall is the museum's largest building, and houses exhibits on the history of the Ringling Brothers Circus, as well as other exhibits relating to general aspects of circuses and circus history.

The Hippodrome is a permanent big-top that houses the museum's daily circus and magic show performances.

The W.W. Deppe Wagon Pavilion houses a collection of fifty restored antique circus wagons.

The C.P. Fox Wagon Restoration Center is used by the museum to refurbish Circus Wagons, and visitors to the building can view wagon restorations that are in progress.

The Robert L. Parkinson Library and Research Center is a research facility holding collections of circus-related books, photographs, archives, and periodicals. The library is open to the public at no charge while staff are present.

== Transportation ==
Due to the long distance between Baraboo and Milwaukee, the Circus World Museum's parade was annually hauled by rail over Chicago and Northwestern (C&NW), Milwaukee Road (MR), Wisconsin and Southern (WSOR), Wisconsin Central (WC), and Soo Line (SOO) trackage, and this lasted until 2000. When traveling by rail, the museum's Circus train would normally be pulled by diesel locomotives, but on some occasions, it would be pulled by a steam locomotive. Such steam locomotives include Chicago Burlington and Quincy No. 4960 in 1965 and 1966, Grand Trunk Western No. 5629 in 1967 and 1968, Southern Railway No. 4501 in 1973, and C&NW No. 1385 in 1985, 1986, and 1987.

== Great Circus Parade ==
The Great Circus Parade, which featured historic circus wagons from the Circus World Museum, was held in Milwaukee in 1963, and in various cities between 1985 and 2005, primarily Milwaukee (1985–2003) and Baraboo, Wisconsin (2004–2005), and Chicago, Illinois. When held in Milwaukee, the parade entailed a two-day journey by train across Wisconsin, from Baraboo to Milwaukee, making brief stops at cities along the way. An encampment on Milwaukee's lakefront allowed visitors to view the circus wagons up close, take elephant, camel, and zebra rides, and view historical circus artifacts. The parade itself took a three-mile route through downtown Milwaukee. It was on hiatus during the mid-2000s, but it returned to Milwaukee in 2009.

== See also ==
- List of National Historic Landmarks in Wisconsin
- National Register of Historic Places listings in Sauk County, Wisconsin
