= 2022 in Poland =

- Decades: 2000s; 2010s; 2020s
- See also: Other events of 2022; Timeline of Polish history

Events in the year 2022 in Poland.

== Incumbents ==
Incumbents
Position	Person	Party
President	Andrzej Duda	Independent (Supported by Law and Justice)
Prime Minister	Mateusz Morawiecki	Law and Justice
Marshal of the Sejm	Elżbieta Witek	Law and Justice
Marshal of the Senate	Tomasz Grodzki	Civic Platform

== Events ==
Ongoing — COVID-19 pandemic in Poland

=== January–February ===
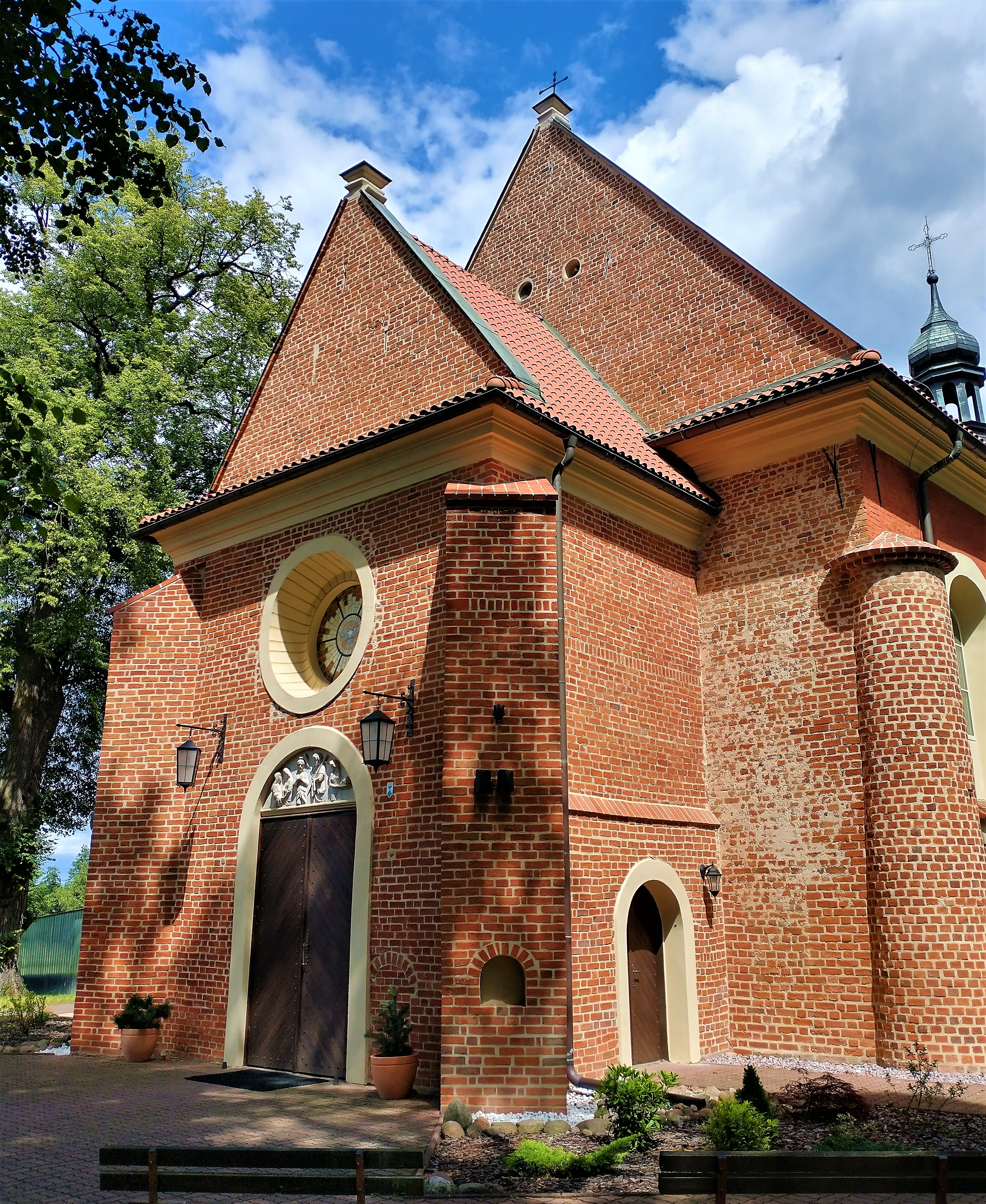
Gothic church in Cegłów in 2022

- 1 January – Ten localities were granted town rights: Bolimów, Cegłów, Iwaniska, Izbica, Jedlnia-Letnisko, Kaczory, Lutomiersk, Nowe Miasto, Olsztyn, and Pruszcz.
- 5 January – President Andrzej Duda tests positive for COVID-19 for the second time. He previously tested positive in October 2020.
- 6 January – The Far right nationalist Confederation Liberty and Independence party Facebook page is taken down by Facebook.
- 11 January – Poland surpasses 100,000 deaths from COVID-19, becoming the 15th nation to do so.
- 21 January – Poland reports a record 36,665 new COVID-19 cases in the past 24 hours, thereby bringing the nationwide total of confirmed cases to 4,443,217.
- 22 January – Poland reports a record for the second consecutive day of 40,876 new COVID-19 cases, thereby bringing the nationwide total of confirmed cases to 4,484,095.
- 26 January – Poland reports a record 53,420 new COVID-19 cases in the past 24 hours, thereby bringing the nationwide total of confirmed cases to 4,637,776.
- 8 February – Poland indefinitely postpones its deadline of March 1 for mandatory full vaccination of teachers, members of the army and police officers because it cannot be met.
- 18 February – U.S. Secretary of Defense Lloyd Austin announces the sale of 250 M1 Abrams main battle tanks to Poland amid tensions with Russia. The Polish Land Forces will become the first European military to operate the American M1 Abrams.
- 26 February – Poland says that around 100,000 Ukrainians have crossed the border since the Russian invasion of Ukraine began.

=== March–April ===
- 11 March – Sejm passes the Homeland Defence Act, increasing the number of active personnel, increasing defence spending, modernizing the army and introducing voluntary basic military recruit training.
- 23 March – Poland expels 45 staff of the Russian embassy in Warsaw for "spying activities"
- 14 April – United Poland calls for tougher blasphemy laws in Poland, such as three-year jail terms for insulting church or interrupting mass.

=== May–June ===
- 14 May
  - Lech Poznań won their eighth Polish Football Championship (see 2021–22 Ekstraklasa).
  - ZAKSA Kędzierzyn-Koźle won their ninth Polish Volleyball Championship defeating Jastrzębski Węgiel in the finals (see 2021–22 PlusLiga).
- 27 May – Śląsk Wrocław won their 18th Polish Basketball Championship defeating Legia Warsaw in the finals (see 2021–22 PLK season).
- 27 June - Completed transition of the digital terrestrial television broadcasting standard from DVB-T / MPEG-4 to DVB-T2 / HEVC

=== July–August ===
- 1 August - state-owned Oil Company PKN Orlen finalised the merger with state-owned Oil Company Lotos.
- 11 August - 2022 Oder environmental disaster
- 26 August – 11 September: 2022 FIVB Volleyball Women's World Championship co-hosted by the Netherlands and Poland

=== September–October ===
- 1 September – Jarosław Kaczyński, leader of the Law and Justice party, announced the government's intent to officially demand that the German government pay 6.2 trillion zł ($1.32 trillion) in reparations.
- 25 September – Motor Lublin won their first Team Speedway Polish Championship defeating Stal Gorzów Wielkopolski in the finals (see 2022 Polish speedway season).
- 27 September – Baltic Pipe is commissioned.
- 7 October – United Poland and Zbigniew Ziobro submit a citizens' legislative initiative for the tougher blasphemy laws with close to 400,000 (Higher than the 100,000 needed) signatures to parliament.
- 9 October – Three people are killed when a wooden tourist boat carrying 14 people capsizes in Gdańsk.
- 10 October – state-controlled oil and gas company, PGNiG Shareholders approve the company's takeover by state-owned Oil Company PKN Orlen, this came after PKN Orlen Shareholders done the same.
- 12 October – Jarosław Kaczyński, leader of the Law and Justice party, says that the Polish Pis government might buy PKP Energetyka and Żabka convenience store from CVC Capital Partners.
- 17 October: The European Commission announce EU cohesion funds (75 billion euros) for Poland would be frozen.

=== November–December ===
- 2 November – Poland's Minister of National Defence Mariusz Błaszczak announces the construction of a barrier along the border with the Russian exclave of Kaliningrad, as Poland believes that Russia will use the border to illegally transport African and Asian immigrants to Europe.
- 15 November – Two missiles impact the territory of Poland near the village of Przewodów near the border with Ukraine.
- 17 November – Germany offers to deploy German Air Force jets to protect Polish airspace in response to the missile strike on Przewodów, Lublin Voivodeship, which killed two people.
- 22 November – Germany says it will deploy Patriot surface-to-air missile systems on the Poland–Ukraine border in order to protect Polish airspace. Polish Defense Minister Mariusz Błaszczak says he has accepted the German proposal.

== Holidays ==
- 1 January - New Year's Day
- 6 January - Epiphany
- 17 April - Easter Sunday
- 18 April - Easter Monday
- 1 May - May Day

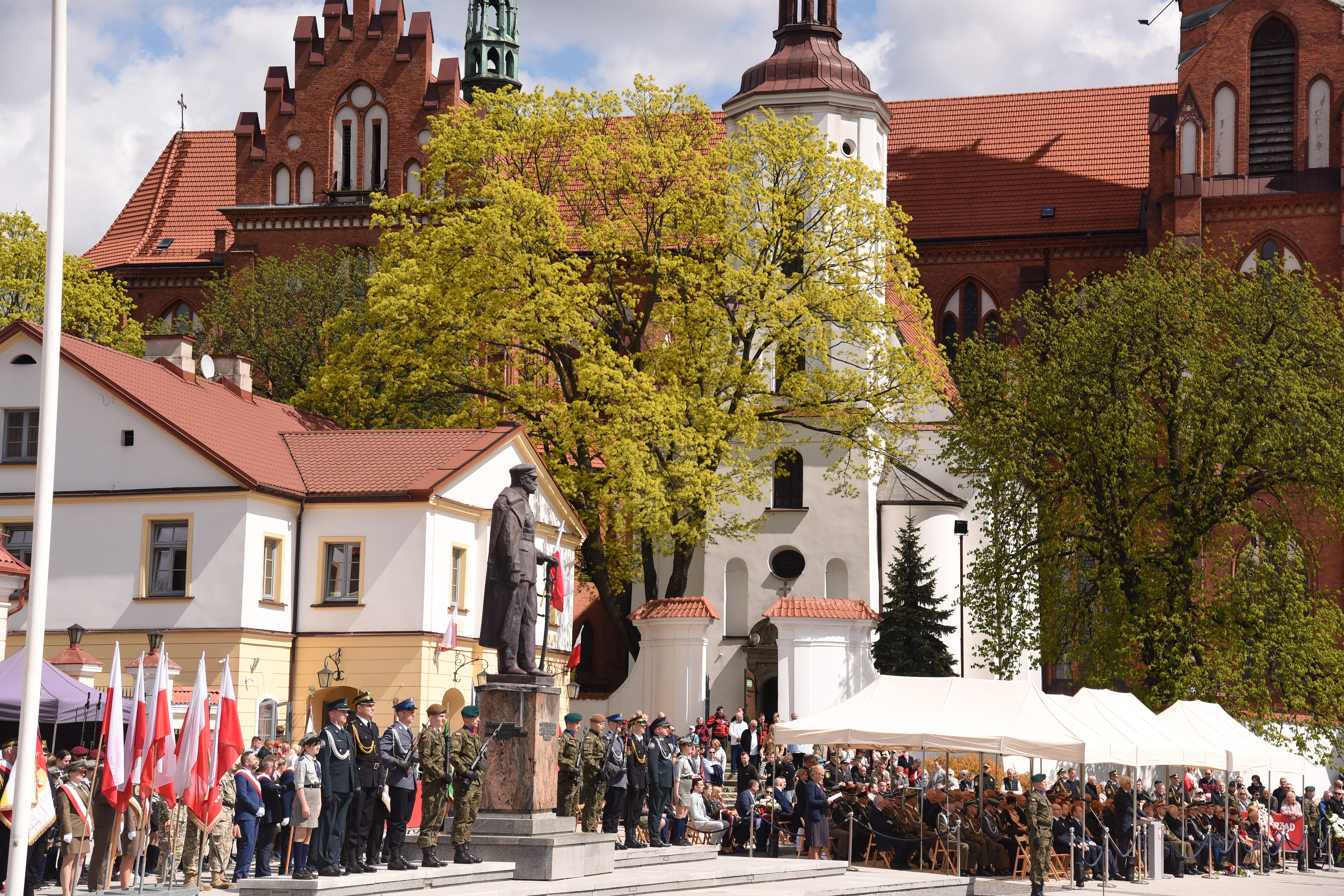
2022 3 May Constitution Day in Białystok

- 3 May - 3 May Constitution Day
- 5 June - Whit Sunday
- 16 June - Corpus Christi
- 15 August - Assumption Day
- 1 November - All Saints' Day
- 11 November - Independence Day
- 25 December - Christmas Day
- 26 December – 2nd Day of Christmas

== Deaths ==
=== January ===
- 1 January — Janusz Łęski, film director (b. 1930)
- 3 January — Zbigniew Łój, Olympic field hockey player (b. 1945)
- 5 January — Marian Machowski, footballer (b. 1932)
- 7 January — John Swantek, American Polish Catholic prelate (b. 1933)
- 11 January — Jerzy Głowacki, Olympic cyclist (b. 1950)
- 19 January
  - Antonina Girycz — actress (b. 1939)
  - Stanisław Grędziński, Olympic sprinter (b. 1945)
- 21 January — Czesław Krakowski, politician (b. 1950)
- 23 January
  - Barbara Krafftówna, actress (b. 1928)
  - Zofia Walasek, Olympic middle-distance runner (b. 1933)
- 24 January — Tadeusz Bradecki, actor (b. 1955)
- 26 January — Jan Michalik, Olympic wrestler (b. 1948)

=== February ===
- 1 February — Stanisław Olejniczak, Olympic basketball player (b. 1938)
- 3 February — Jarosław Marek Rymkiewicz, writer and literary critic (b. 1935)
- 4 February — Jerzy Osiatyński, politician (b. 1941)
- 6 February
  - Ryszard Kubiak, Olympic rowing coxswain (b. 1950)
  - Zdzisław Jan Ryn, psychiatrist and diplomat (b. 1939)
- 7 February
  - Jerzy Bartmiński, linguist and ethnologist (b. 1939)
  - Zbigniew Namysłowski, jazz musician and composer (b. 1939)
  - Andrzej Rapacz, Olympic biathlete (b. 1948)
- 8 February — Krzysztof Kuszewski, epidemiologist and state official (b. 1940)
- 9 February — Jan Magiera, Olympic cyclist (b. 1938)
- 10 February
  - Roman Kostrzewski, heavy metal musician (b. 1960)
  - Stefan Żywotko, football manager (b. 1920)
- 14 February — Daniel Passent, journalist and writer (b. 1938)
- 15 February — Józef Zapędzki, Olympic sport shooter (b. 1929)
- 18 February
  - Witold Paszt, singer (b. 1953)
  - Zdzisław Podkański, politician (b. 1949)
- 20 February — Krystyna Meissner, theatre director (b. 1933)
- 24 February — Jan Gomola, footballer (b. 1941)

=== March ===
- 13 March
  - Pawel Kwiek, photographer (b. 1951)
  - Adam Odzimek, Roman Catholic prelate (b. 1944)
- 16 March — Józef Różański, politician (b. 1931)
- 17 March — Piotr Drzewiecki, footballer (b. 1950)
- 19 March — Marian Zembala, surgeon, academic and politician (b. 1950)
- 22 March — Edmund Michał Piszcz, Roman Catholic prelate (b. 1929)
- 23 March — Andrzej Cwojdziński, conductor, composer and music teacher (b. 1928)
- 26 March — Teofil Wilski, Roman Catholic prelate (b. 1935)
- 30 March
  - Andrzej Butra, veterinarian and politician (b. 1961)
  - Egon Franke, Olympic fencer (b. 1935)
- 31 March
  - Andrzej Bujakiewicz, conductor and teacher (b. 1939)
  - Marek Pasionek, lawyer and government official (b. 1961)

=== April ===
- 1 April
  - Ryszard Frąckiewicz, diplomat, ambassador to Australia and Japan (b. 1931)
  - Jolanta Lothe, actress (b. 1942)
- 3 April — Andrzej Wiśniewski, football coach (b. 1956)
- 5 April — Stanisław Kowalski, masters athlete, nation's oldest living man (since 2018) (b. 1910)
- 7 April — Ludwik Dorn, politician (b. 1954)
- 18 April — Andrzej Korzyński, composer (b. 1940)
- 20 April — Erwina Ryś-Ferens, four-time Olympic speed skater (b. 1955)
- 27 April — Adam Lepa, Roman Catholic prelate and theologian (b. 1939)

=== May ===
- 4 May —
  - Zbigniew Kicka, Olympic boxer (b. 1950)
  - Józef Leśniak, politician (b. 1968)
- 6 May — Mirosław Pietrewicz, economist and politician (b. 1941)
- 7 May — Marek Grabowski, doctor and politician (b. 1950)
- 9 May — Tadeusz Grygiel, basketball player (b. 1954)
- 12 May — Maria Pańczyk-Pozdziej, politician (b. 1942)
- 15 May —
  - Ignacy Gogolewski, actor (b. 1931)
  - Tadeusz Kowalczyk, politician and activist (b. 1933)
  - Jerzy Trela, actor (b. 1942)
- 23 May —
  - Élie Buzyn, Polish-born French surgeon and Holocaust survivor (b. 1929)
  - Maja Lidia Kossakowska, fantasy writer (b. 1972)
- 24 May — Tadeusz Jankowski, Olympic cross-country skier (b. 1930)
- 29 May — Maria Mirecka-Loryś, World War II resistance member (b. 1916)
- 30 May — Mariusz Linke, mixed martial artist and grappler (b. 1969)

=== June ===
- 2 June — Kai Bumann, German-Polish conductor and teacher (b. 1961)
- 3 June — Adam Wolańczyk, actor (b. 1936)
- 4 June — Bolesław Tejkowski, politician, sociologist and engineer (b. 1933)
- 9 June — Biruta Lewaszkiewicz-Petrykowska, lawyer and judge (b. 1927)
- 10 June — Kazimierz Rynkowski, politician and lawyer (b. 1933)
- 14 June — Aleksander Mackiewicz, politician and economist (b. 1944)
- 17 June — Nicole Tomczak-Jaegermann, Polish-Canadian mathematician (b. 1945)
- 20 June — Józef Walaszczyk, leatherworker and businessman (b. 1919)
- 26 June — Jerzy Kopa, football player and manager (b. 1943)
- 30 June — Kazimierz Zimny, athlete (b. 1935)

=== July ===
- 4 July — Janusz Kupcewicz, football player and manager (b. 1955)
- 13 July — Anna Jakubowska, World War II combatant and community activist (b. 1927)
- 24 July — Janina Altman, Polish-Israeli chemist and Holocaust survivor (b. 1931)
- 26 July — Uri Orlev, Polish-Israeli children's author (b. 1931)

=== August ===
- 1 August — Teresa Ferenc, poet (b. 1934)
- 2 August — Jan Budkiewicz, publicist, screenwriter, and politician (b. 1934)
- 2 August — Zbyszko Piwoński, politician, voivode of Zielona Góra (1984–1990) and senator (b. 1929)
- 7 August — Henryk Dziewior, entrepreneur and politician (b. 1948)
- 8 August — Zofia Posmysz, journalist and author (b. 1923)
- 12 August — Natalia LL, visual artist (b. 1937)
- 13 August — Tadeusz Bartczak, chemist and crystallographer (b. 1935)
- 14 August — Stefan Gierowski, painter and avant garde artist (b. 1925)
- 14 August — Svika Pick, Polish-born Israeli singer and songwriter (b. 1949)
- 15 August — Rajmund Zieliński, Olympic cyclist (b. 1940)
- 16 August — Stanisław Masternak, politician (b. 1946)
- 19 August — Tekla Juniewicz, supercentenarian (b. 1906)
- 22 August — Edmund Borowski, sprinter (b. 1945)
- 27 August — Tadeusz Ferenc, economist and politician (b. 1940)
- 30 August — Tadeusz Myler, politician (b. 1949)

=== September ===
- 1 September — Adam Kułach, diplomat (b. 1965)
- 4 September — Janusz Batugowski, footballer (b. 1948)
- 4 September — Edward Hulewicz, singer (b. 1937)
- 6 September — Ligia Borowczyk, actress (b. 1932)
- 13 September — Grzegorz Matuszak, sociologist and politician (b. 1941)
- 16 September — Stanisław Żytkowski, lawyer and politician (b. 1948)
- 21 September — Edward Mosberg, holocaust survivor (b. 1926)
- 21 September — Tomasz Wołek, journalist and sports commentator (b. 1947)
- 23 September — Franciszek Pieczka, actor (b. 1928)
- 28 September — Jan Styrna, Roman Catholic prelate (b. 1941)
- 29 September — Mieczysław Gil, MP (b. 1944)

=== October ===
- 1 October — Lech Krzysztof Paprzycki, judge (b. 1947)
- 3 October — Jerzy Urban, journalist (b. 1933)
- 9 October — Leszek Tadeusz Biały, politician (b. 1940)
- 12 October — Dariusz Raczyński, footballer (b. 1962)
- 14 October — Feliks W. Kres, writer (b. 1966)
- 17 October — Zbigniew Senkowski, politician (b. 1955)
- 19 October — Stanisław Ciosek, politician (b. 1939)
- 21 October — Marcin Giżycki, film and art historian (b. 1951)
- 22 October — Leszek Engelking, writer (b. 1955)
- 23 October — Marian Fuks, historian (b. 1914)
- 24 October — Tomasz Wójtowicz, volleyball player (b. 1953)
- 28 October — Helena Łazarska, operatic and vocal pedagogue (b. 1934)
- 28 October — Andrzej Magowski, footballer (b. 1966)
- 30 October — Jack Terry, Polish-American author and Holocaust survivor (b. 1930)
- 30 October — Lucyna Wiśniewska, politician (b. 1955)
- 30 October — Marek Wojtera, politician (b. 1963)

=== November ===
- 4 November — Igor Sypniewski, footballer (b. 1974)
- 5 November — Gabriela Cwojdzińska, pianist and politician (b. 1928)
- 5 November — Irène Kaufer, author (b. 1950)
- 12 November — Zbigniew Cyganik, politician (b. 1932)
- 14 November — Jerzy Połomski, singer and actor (b. 1933)
- 14 November — Adam Zieliński, politician (b. 1931)
- 16 November — Piotr Pankanin, politician (b. 1948)
- 17 November — Barbara Hyla-Makowska, teacher and politician (b. 1946)
- 18 November — Sever Sternhell, chemist (b. 1930)
- 25 November — Edward Leier, Ice hockey player (b. 1927)

=== December ===
- 7 December — Jan Nowicki, actor (b. 1939)
- 12 December — Zbigniew Wawer, historian (b. 1956)
- 12 December — Mirosław Hermaszewski, cosmonaut (b. 1941)
- 13 December — Mariusz Walter media mogul (b. 1937)
- 16 December — Bogdan Łysak, politician (b. 1936)
- 20 December — Tadeusz Werno, Roman Catholic prelate (b. 1931)
- 20 December — Lech Kuropatwiński, politician (b. 1947)
- 21 December — Ludwik Synowiec, Ice hockey player (b. 1958)
- 22 December — Maria Nowak, economist (b. 1935)
- 24 December — Andrzej Pstrokoński, basketball player (b. 1936)
- 25 December — Bogusław Litwiniec, politician (b. 1931)
- 25 December — Haim Drukman, Polish-born Israeli Orthodox rabbi and politician (b. 1932)
- 26 December — Emilian Kamiński, actor (b. 1952)
- 27 December — Andrzej Iwan, footballer (b. 1959)

== See also ==
- Withdrawn Kraków bid for the 2022 Winter Olympics
