= Kuszewski =

Kuszewski (feminine: Kuszewska; plural: Kuszewscy) is a Polish surname. Notable people with the surname include:

- Krzysztof Kuszewski (1940–2022), Polish politician
- Marcin Kuszewski (born 1977), Polish hurdler
- Marian Kuszewski (1933–2012), Polish fencer
