= Drzewiecki =

Drzewiecki (feminine: Drzewiecka; plural: Drzewieccy) is a Polish surname. Notable people with the surname include:

- Andy Drzewiecki (born 1947), English weightlifter
- Gary Drzewiecki (born 1954), American businessman and politician
- Jerzy Drzewiecki (1902–1990), Polish aeroplane constructor
- Karol Drzewiecki (born 1995), Polish tennis player
- Luke Drzewiecki (born 2003), American football player
- Mirosław Drzewiecki (born 1956), Polish politician
- Piotr Drzewiecki (footballer) (1950–2022), Polish footballer
- Piotr Drzewiecki (mayor) (1865–1943), Polish politician
- Ron Drzewiecki (1933–2015), American football player
- Stanisław Drzewiecki (born 1987), Polish pianist
- Stefan Drzewiecki (1844–1938), Polish scientist
- Zbigniew Drzewiecki (1890–1971), Polish pianist
