= Bartczak =

Bartczak is a Polish surname. It may refer to:

- Agnieszka Bartczak (born 1981), Polish wheelchair tennis player
- Andrzej Marian Bartczak (1945–2025), Polish artist and educator
- Carolina Bartczak (born 1985), German–born Canadian actress
- Grzegorz Bartczak (born 1985), Polish soccer player
- Jolanta Bartczak (born 1964), Polish long jumper
- Mateusz Bartczak (born 1979), Polish soccer player
- Michał Bartczak (born 1987), Polish handball player
- Robert Bartczak (born 1996), Polish soccer player
- Tadeusz Bartczak (1935–2022), Polish chemist
