= Zbyszko Piwoński =

Polish teacher and politician (1929–2022)

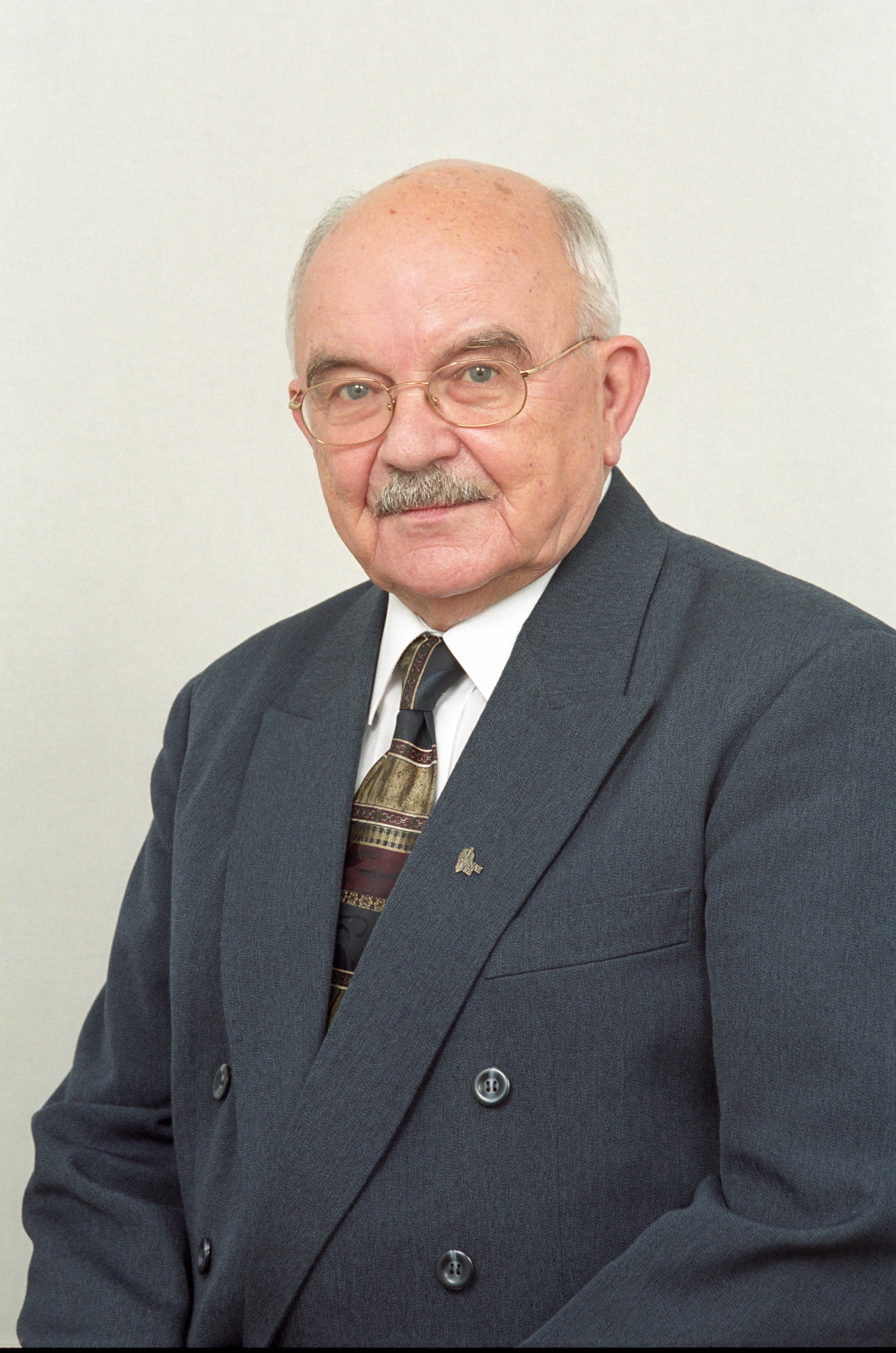
- Piwoński in 2006

Member of the Senate of Poland
- In office 15 October 1993 – 18 October 2005

Voivode of Zielona Góra Voivodeship
- In office 1984–1990
- Preceded by: Walerian Mikołajczak
- Succeeded by: Jarosław Barańczak

Personal details
- Born: 9 July 1929; Stawiska, Poland
- Died: 2 August 2022 (aged 93)
- Political party: PZPR; SLD
- Education: University of Opole
- Occupation: Teacher

Zbyszko Piwoński (9 July 1929 – 2 August 2022) was a Polish teacher and politician. A member of the Polish United Workers' Party and later the Democratic Left Alliance, he served as Voivode of Zielona Góra Voivodeship from 1984 to 1990 and was a Senator from 1993 to 2005.

Piwoński died on 2 August 2022, at the age of 93.
