= Coat of arms of the Lubusz Voivodeship =

Polish coat of arms

Coat of arms of Lubusz Voivodeship
- Armiger: Lubusz Voivodeship
- Adopted: 26 June 2000
- Shield: Vertically divided Iberian style escutcheon with red on the left side, and green on the right side
- Compartment: left half of the white (silver) eagle, with yellow (golden) crown, legs, a ring on its tail, and a przepaska on its wing, placed on the left side, and two yellow (golden) six-pointed stars, placed vertically, placed on the right side

The coat of arms of Lubusz Voivodeship, Poland, features an Iberian style escutcheon divided vertically onto two sides, of which, the left side has red background, with left side of a white (silver) eagle, with yellow (golden) crown, legs, a ring on its tail, and a przepaska on its wing, while the right side, has green background with two yellow (golden) six-pointed stars, placed vertically. It was established in 2000.

== Design ==
The coat of arms is an Iberian style escutcheon divided vertically onto two sides. The left side consists of red background, with a left half of the white (silver) eagle, with yellow (golden) crown, legs, a ring on its tail, and a przepaska on its wing, in the form of thin upwards curved bar ended with trillium-like shape. The right side had green background with two yellow (golden) six-pointed stars, placed vertically.

The white (silver) eagle on the red background has been based on the coat of arms of Poland, and symbolizes the alliance of the voivodeship to that country. The green colour symbolizes the forests that cover around half of the region, while 2 stars symbolize the two seat cities of the voivodeship: Zielona Góra, and Gorzów Wielkopolski.

== History ==
The coat of arms of the Lubusz Land used from 14th to 16th century.

The coat of arms of the Lubusz Land began being used in the first half of the 14th century, as the symbol of the Roman Catholic Diocese of Lebus. The diocese was dissolved in 1598. It consisted of a red shield depicting two crossed white (silver) pike poles, and a yellow (golden) hexagram (six-pointed star) above them. Currently, its design is used in the coat of arms of the Roman Catholic Archdiocese of Berlin and the Roman Catholic Diocese of Zielona Góra and Gorzów.

The coat of arms of the Zielona Góra Voivodeship used from 1985 to 1998.

Prior to establishment of the Lubusz Voivodeship, within its current borders, from 1975 to 1998, existed the Zielona Góra Voivodeship. It had adopted its coat of arms on 18 July 1985. The coat of arms had a red Norman style escutcheon with square top and acute base. Inside the shield was featured a white (silver) eagle with elevated wings, and a green figure in a shape of the borders of the voivodeship, with two blue rivers featured on it: Oder and Lusatian Neisse.

The Lubusz Voivodeship was established in 1998. Its coat of arms was adopted by the Lubusz Regional Assembly, on 26 June 2000 with resolution no. XVIII/114/2000. The flag and the coat of arms were designed by Wojciech Strzyżewski. The coat of arms is additionally present in the centre of the state flag of the voivodeship.

== See also ==
- flag of the Lubusz Voivodeship
