= Zielona Góra Voivodeship (1975–1998) =

Voivodeship of Poland from 1975 to 1998

- Voivodeship of the Polish People's Republic and Third Republic of Poland
- 1975–1998
- Flag Coat of arms

- The administrative subdivisions of Poland from 1975 to 1998, including the Zielona Góra Voivodeship.
- Capital: Zielona Góra
- Area
  - 1997: 8,868 km^{2} (3,424 sq mi)
- Population
  - 1975: 580 000
  - 1997: 677 800
- Government
  - Type: Voivodeship
- Voivode
  - 1975–1980 (first): Jan Lembas
  - 1997–1998 (last): Marian Miłek
- History
  - Established: 1 June 1975
  - Disestablished: 31 December 1998
- Contained within
  - Country: Polish People's Republic (1975–1989); Third Republic of Poland (1989–1998)
- Political subdivisions: 57 gminas (1997)
Preceded by	Succeeded by
Zielona Góra Voivodeship	Lubusz Voivodeship; Greater Poland Voivodeship

The Zielona Góra Voivodeship (Note: Polish: Województwo zielonogórskie) was a voivodeship (province) of the Polish People's Republic from 1975 to 1989, and the Third Republic of Poland from 1989 to 1998. Its capital was Zielona Góra, and it was centered on the southern Lubusz Land, in west-centre part of the county. It was established on 1 June 1975, from the part of the Zielona Góra Voivodeship, and existed until 31 December 1998, when it was incorporated into then-established Lubusz and Greater Poland Voivodeships.

== History ==
The Zielona Góra was established on 1 June 1975, as part of the administrative reform, and was one of the voivodeships (provinces) of the Polish People's Republic. It was formed from the part of the territory of the Zielona Góra Voivodeship. Its capital was located in the city of Zielona Góra. In 1975, it was inhabited by 580 000 people.

On 9 December 1989, the Polish People's Republic was replaced by the Third Republic of Poland. In 1997, the voivodeship had a population of 677 800, and in 1998, it had an area of 8,868 km^{2} (3,424 sq mi). It existed until 31 December 1998, when most of its territory being incorporated into then-established Lubusz Voivodeship, with some additionally being incorporated into the Greater Poland Voivodeship.

== Subdivisions ==
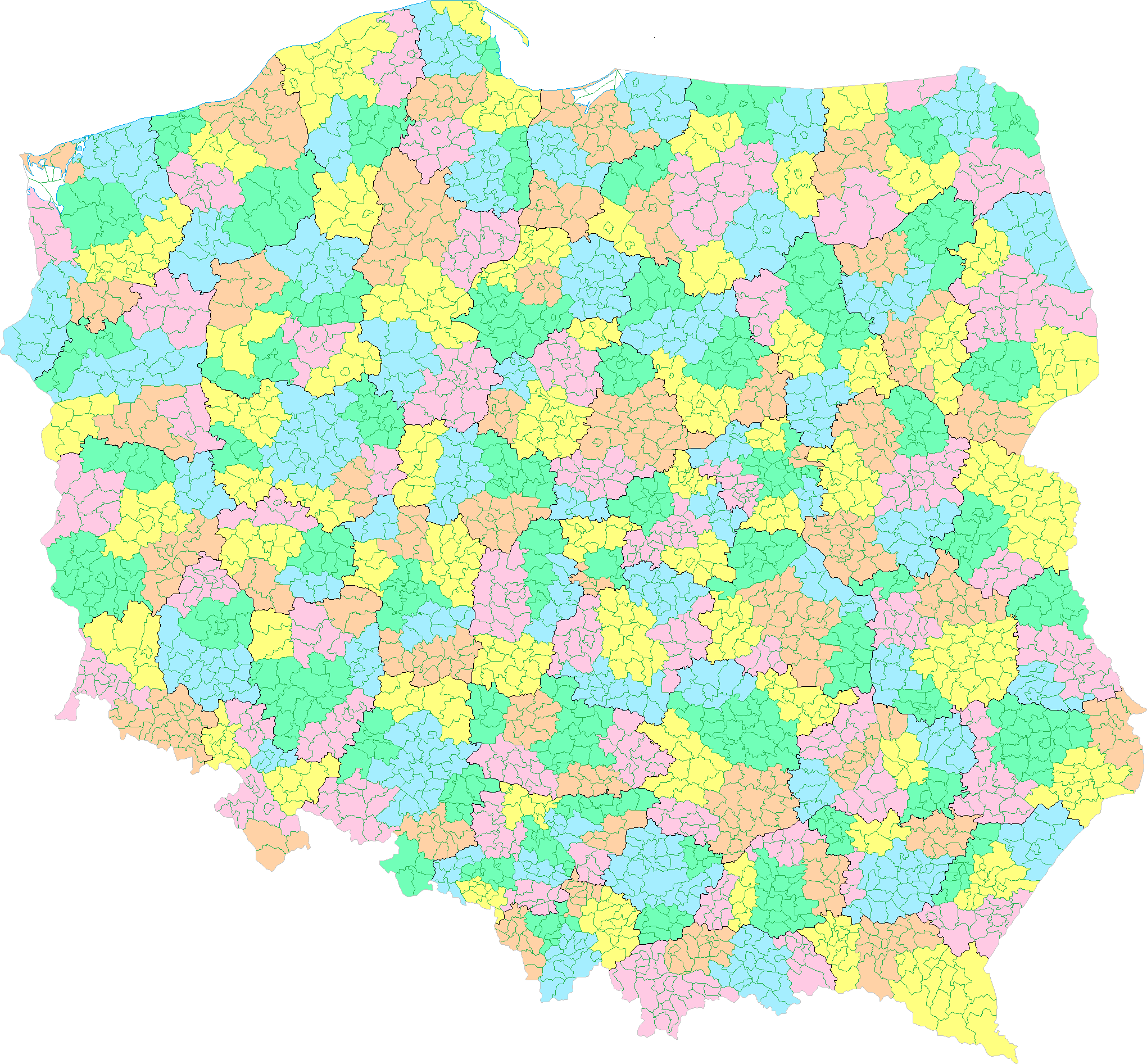
The district offices and gminas (municipalities) of Poland in 1998, including the Zielona Góra Voivodeship.

In 1997, the voivodeship was divided into 57 gminas (municipalities), including 7 urban municipalities, 21 urban-rural municipalities, and 29 rural municipalities. It had 28 cities and towns.

From 1990 to 1998, it was additionally divided into six district offices, each comprising several municipalities.

== Demographics ==
=== Population ===
Year	Population
1975	580 000
1980	609 200
1985	646 000
1990	658 700
1995	660 000
1997	677 800

=== Settlements ===
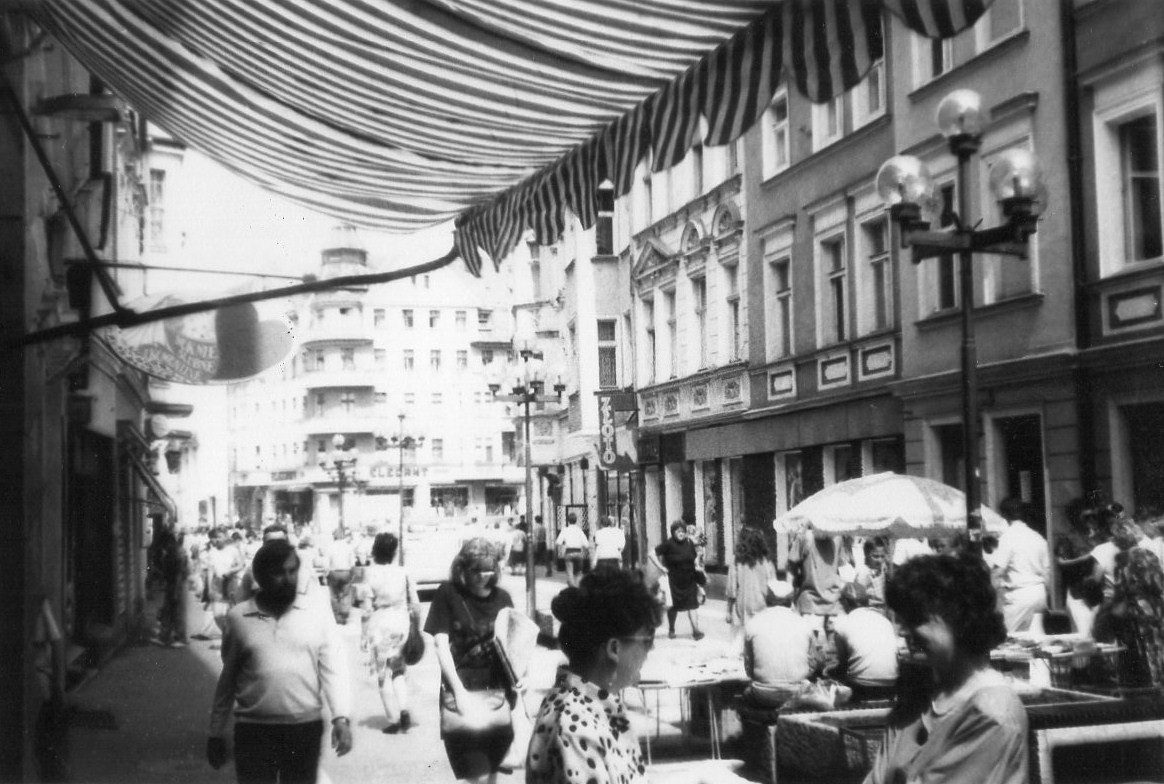
Zielona Góra in 1992

In 1997, the voivodeship had 28 cities and towns. In 1998, the biggest cities and towns by population were:

- Zielona Góra (118 182);
- Nowa Sól (42 662);
- Żary (40 732);
- Żagań (28 170);
- Świebodzin (22 539);
- Gubin (18 893);
- Sulechów (18 250);
- Lubsko (15 511);
- Wolsztyn (13 879);
- Szprotawa (13 139);
- Krosno Odrzańskie (13 000);
- Kożuchów (9 967);
- Zbąszyń (7 500);
- Zbąszynek (5 100);
- Iłowa (4 100);
- Sława (4000).

== Symbols ==
The voivodeship had addopped its flag and coat of arms on 18 July 1985. The coat of arms had a red Norman style escutcheon (shield) with square top and acute base. Inside the shield was featured a white (silver) eagle with elevated wings, and a green figure in a shape of the borders of the voivodeship, with two blue rivers featured on it: Oder and Lusatian Neisse. Its flag was a rectangle divided horizontally into two stripes, a yellow one on the top, and a green one on the bottom.

== Leaders ==
The leader of the administrative division was the voivode. Those were:

- 1975–1980: Jan Lembas;
- 1980–1982: Zbigniew Cyganik;
- 1982–1984: Walerian Mikołajczak;
- 1984–1990: Zbyszko Piwoński;
- 1990–1993: Jarosław Barańczak;
- 1993–1997: Marian Eckert;
- 1997–1998: Marian Miłek.
