= Krupske, Lviv Oblast =

Krupsko
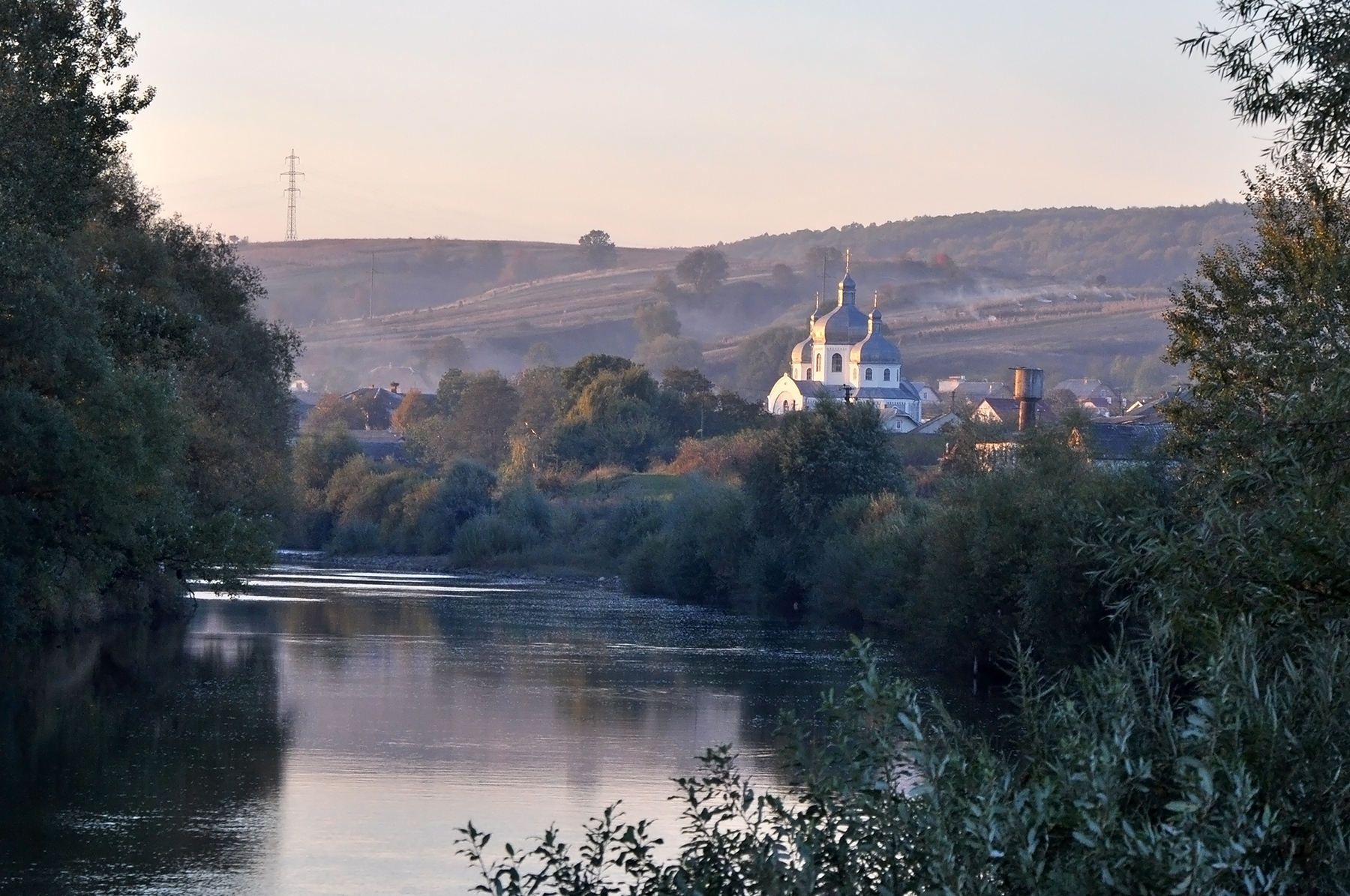
- Krupsko Church

- Location within Lviv Oblast Location within Ukraine
- Coordinates: 49°27′45″N 24°02′00″E

Population
  - Total: 1,494

Krupske (Ukrainian: Крупське; Polish: Krupsko) is a village in Ukraine. It belongs to the Stryi Raion of Lviv Oblast and has 1494 inhabitants.

== History ==
Stanisław Beydo Rzewuski of the Krzywda coat of arms for some time owned the village of Krupsko in the Żydaczów district during the First Polish Republic.

During the Second Polish Republic, until 1934, the village was an independent unit commune in the Żydaczów County in the Stanisławów Voivodeship. In connection with the merger reform, on August 1, 1934, it was incorporated into the newly created rural collective commune of the Rozdół commune in the same county and voivodeship. After the war, the village entered the administrative structures of the Soviet Union.

== Notable people ==
- Tekla Juniewicz, one of the oldest people ever (1906-2022)
