= Flag of Lubusz Voivodeship =

Flag of the Lubusz Voivodeship, Poland

Lubusz Voivodeship
- Use: civil flag
- Proportion: 5:8
- Adopted: 26 June 2000
- Design: Four stripes, which are, from top to bottom, yellow (golden), white, (silver), red, and green, with top and bottom stripes being twice the size of the 2 middle stripes
- Designed by: Wojciech Strzyżewski
- Use: state flag
- Proportion: 5:8
- Adopted: 26 June 2000
- Design: Four stripes, which are, from top to bottom, yellow (golden), white, (silver), red, and green, with top and bottom stripes being twice the size of the 2 middle stripes, and with the coat of arms of the voivodeship placed in the centre
- Designed by: Wojciech Strzyżewski

The civil flag of the Lubusz Voivodeship, Poland is a rectangle divided into 4 stripes, which are, from top to bottom, yellow (golden), white, (silver), red, and green. Top and bottom stripes are twice the size of the 2 middle stripes. The state flag features the design of the civil flag, with the coat of arms of the voivodeship placed in the centre. It was adopted on 26 June 2000.

== Design ==
The civil flag of the Lubusz Voivodeship a rectangle, with the aspect ratio of height to width of 5:8, that is divided into 4 stripes. Those stripes are, from top to bottom, yellow (golden), white, (silver), red, and green. Top and bottom stripes are twice the size of the 2 middle stripes.

The state flag is a civil flag with the coat of arms of the voivodeship placed in the centre. The coat of arms is an Iberian style escutcheon divided vertically onto two sides. The left side consists of red background, with a left half of the white (silver) eagle, with yellow (golden) crown, legs, a ring on its tail, and a przepaska on its wing, in the form of thin upwards curved bar ended with trillium-like shape. The right side had green background with two yellow (golden) six-pointed stars, placed vertically. The white (silver) eagle on the red background has been based on the coat of arms of Poland, and symbolizes the alliance of the voivodeship to that country. The green colour symbolizes the forests that cover around half of the region, while 2 stars symbolize the two seats cities of the voivodeship: Zielona Góra, and Gorzów Wielkopolski.

== History ==
The flag of the Zielona Góra Voivodeship used between 1985 and 1998.

Prior to establishment of the Lubusz Voivodeship, within its current borders, from 1975 to 1998, existed the Zielona Góra Voivodeship. It had adopted its flag on 18 July 1985. It was a rectangle divided horizontally into two stripes, a yellow one on the top, and a green one on the bottom.

The Lubusz Voivodeship was established in 1999. Its flag had been adopted by the Lubusz Regional Assembly, on 26 June 2000 with the resolution no. XVIII/114/2000. The flag and the coat of arms were designed by Wojciech Strzyżewski.

== See also ==
- coat of arms of the Lubusz Voivodeship
