= Zbigniew Cyganik =

Polish politician (1932–2022)

Voivode of Zielona Góra
- In office 1980–1982
- Preceded by: Jan Lembas
- Succeeded by: Walerian Mikołajczak

Personal details
- Born: 20 November 1932 Kraków, Poland
- Died: 12 November 2022 (aged 89) Zielona Góra, Poland
- Party: PZPR

Zbigniew Cyganik (20 November 1932 – 12 November 2022) was a Polish politician. A member of the Polish United Workers' Party, he served as Voivode of Zielona Góra from 1980 to 1982.

Cyganik died in Zielona Góra on 12 November 2022, at the age of 89.
