= Maria Mirecka-Loryś =

Polish freedom fighter (1916–2022)

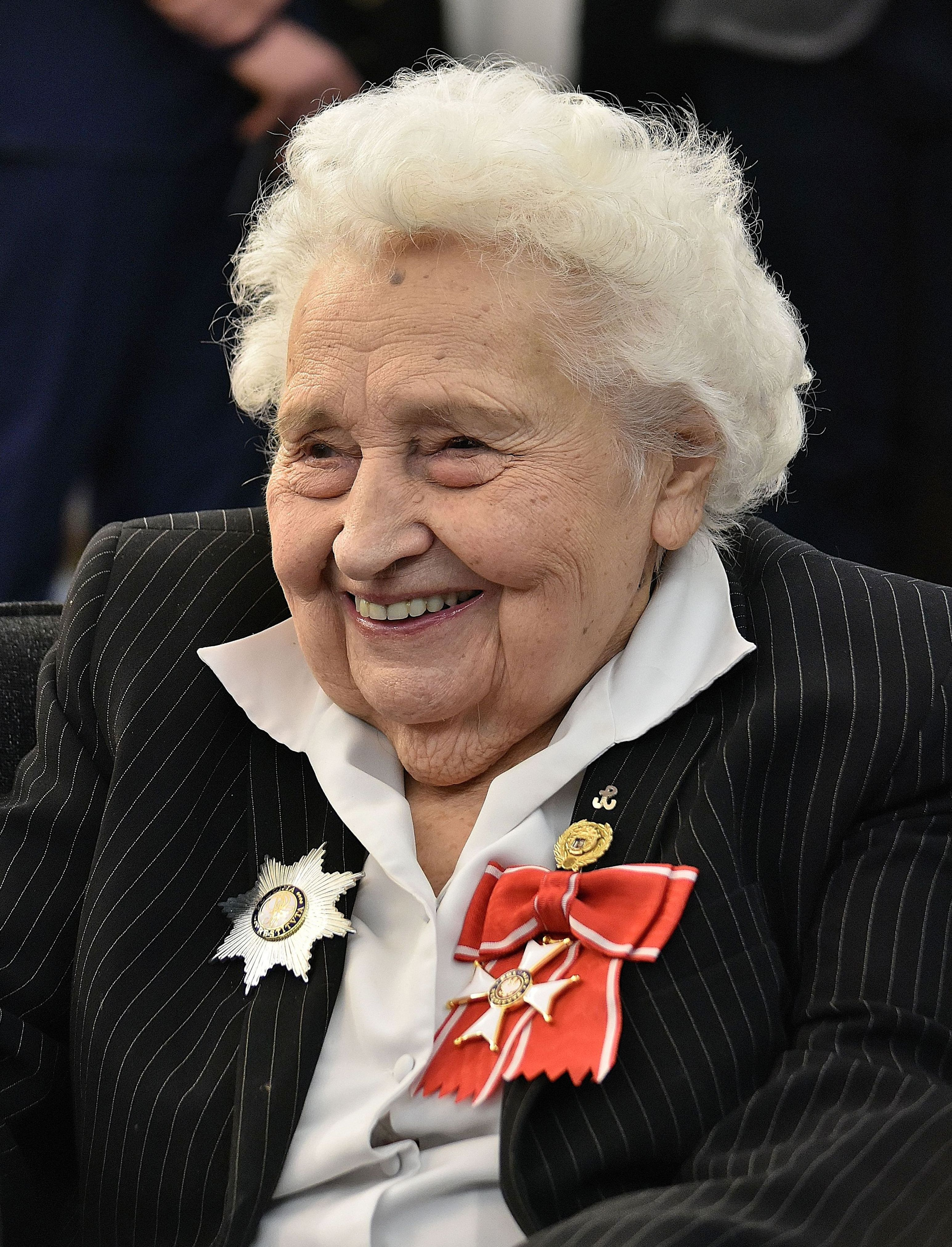
- Mirecka-Loryś in 2016
- Born: 7 February 1916; Ulanów, Galicia and Lodomeria, Cisleithania, Austria-Hungary (now Poland)
- Died: 29 May 2022 (aged 106)
- Military career
- Allegiance: Polish Underground State
- Service years: 1939–1946
- Rank: Major
- Unit: Polish II Corps
- Conflicts: Second World War; Anti-communist resistance in Poland
- Awards: Order of Polonia Restituta; Cross of Merit; Partisan Cross; Armia Krajowa Cross; Pro Patria Medal

Maria Mirecka-Loryś (7 February 1916 – 29 May 2022) was a Polish World War II Resistance member. She was a member of the National Military Organization, Commander in Chief of the Women's National Military Union, member of the Union of Polish Women in America, and director of the National Board of the American Polish Congress.

== Awards and honours ==
- Cross of Merit
- Cross of Valour
- Pro Patria Medal
- Commander's Cross of the Order of Polonia Restituta
