= Barbara Hyla-Makowska =

Polish politician (1946–2022)

Member of the Sejm
- In office 14 October 1993 – 18 October 2005

Personal details
- Born: Barbara Zofia Szczygielska; 30 March 1946 Przasnysz, Poland
- Died: 17 November 2022 (aged 76)
- Party: SLD
- Education: Jan Długosz University
- Occupation: Teacher

Barbara Zofia Hyla-Makowska (née Szczygielska, 30 March 1946 – 17 November 2022) was a Polish teacher and politician. A member of the Democratic Left Alliance, she served in the Sejm from 1993 to 2005.

Hyla-Makowska died on 17 November 2022, at the age of 76.
