= Leszek Tadeusz Biały =

Polish teacher and politician (1940–2022)

Member of the Sejm
- In office 25 November 1991 – 31 May 1993
- Constituency: District No.7

Personal details
- Born: 22 March 1940 Srebrna, Zichenau, East Prussia, Nazi Germany
- Died: 9 October 2022 (aged 82)
- Party: SLD
- Education: University of Warsaw
- Occupation: Teacher

Leszek Tadeusz Biały (22 March 1940 – 9 October 2022) was a Polish politician. A member of the Democratic Left Alliance, he served in the Sejm from 1991 to 1993.

Biały died on 9 October 2022, at the age of 82.
