= Stanisław Żytkowski =

Polish lawyer and politician (1948–2022)

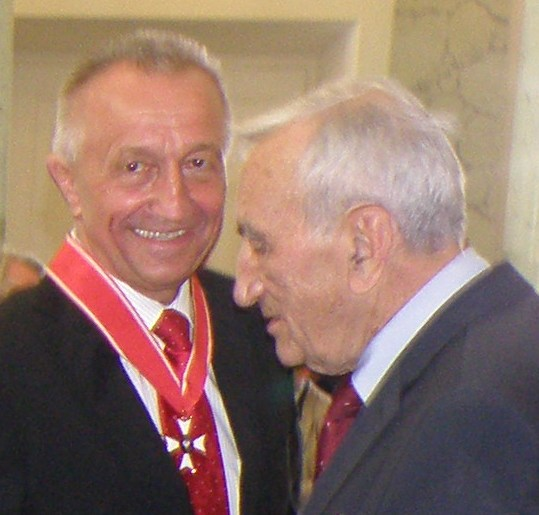
- Żytkowski (left) in 2011

Member of the Senate of Poland
- In office 18 June 1989 – 25 November 1991

Personal details
- Born: 1 January 1948 Gorzów Wielkopolski, Poland
- Died: 16 September 2022 (aged 74) Gorzów Wielkopolski, Poland
- Party: KO "S"; UD
- Education: Adam Mickiewicz University in Poznań
- Occupation: Lawyer

Stanisław Żytkowski (1 January 1948 – 16 September 2022) was a Polish lawyer and politician. A member of the Solidarity Citizens' Committee and later the Democratic Union, he served in the Senate of Poland from 1989 to 1991.

Żytkowski died in Gorzów Wielkopolski on 16 September 2022, at the age of 74.
