= Zbigniew Wawer =

Polish historian and author (1956–2022)

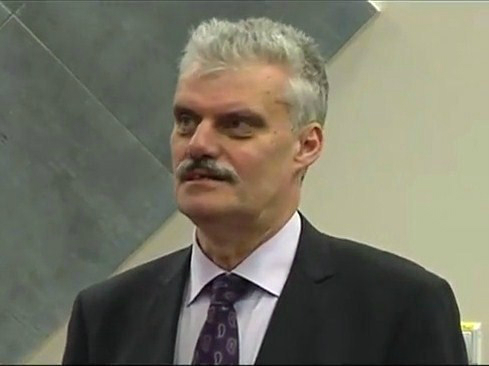
Zbigniew Wawer (2013)

Zbigniew Wawer (17 March 1956 – 12 December 2022) was a Polish historian, specializing in Polish Armed Forces in the West military history in World War II. He was the author of several books, articles, and documentaries.

Wawer died on 12 December 2022, at the age of 66.

== Works ==
- Monte Cassino. Walki 2 Korpusu Polskiego. Wydawnictwo Bellona S.A., Warszawa 2009, s. 424. ISBN 978-83-11-11519-4
- Od Buzułuku do Monte Cassino. ZP Grupa Sp. z o.o.. s. 160. ISBN 978-83-61529-39-2
- Tobruk 1941. Bellona, 2011. s. 200. ISBN 978-83-11-12157-7

== Sources ==
- Ukazało się "Monte Cassino. Walki 2 Korpusu Polskiego" Zbigniewa Wawra
- "Monte Cassino. Walki 2 Korpusu Polskiego" - Zbigniew Wawer
- "Czerwone maki...". Recenzja książki: Zbigniew Wawer, Monte Cassino. Walki 2 Korpusu Polskiego
- Zbigniew Wawer - filmografia
