= Józef Leśniak =

Polish politician (1968–2022)

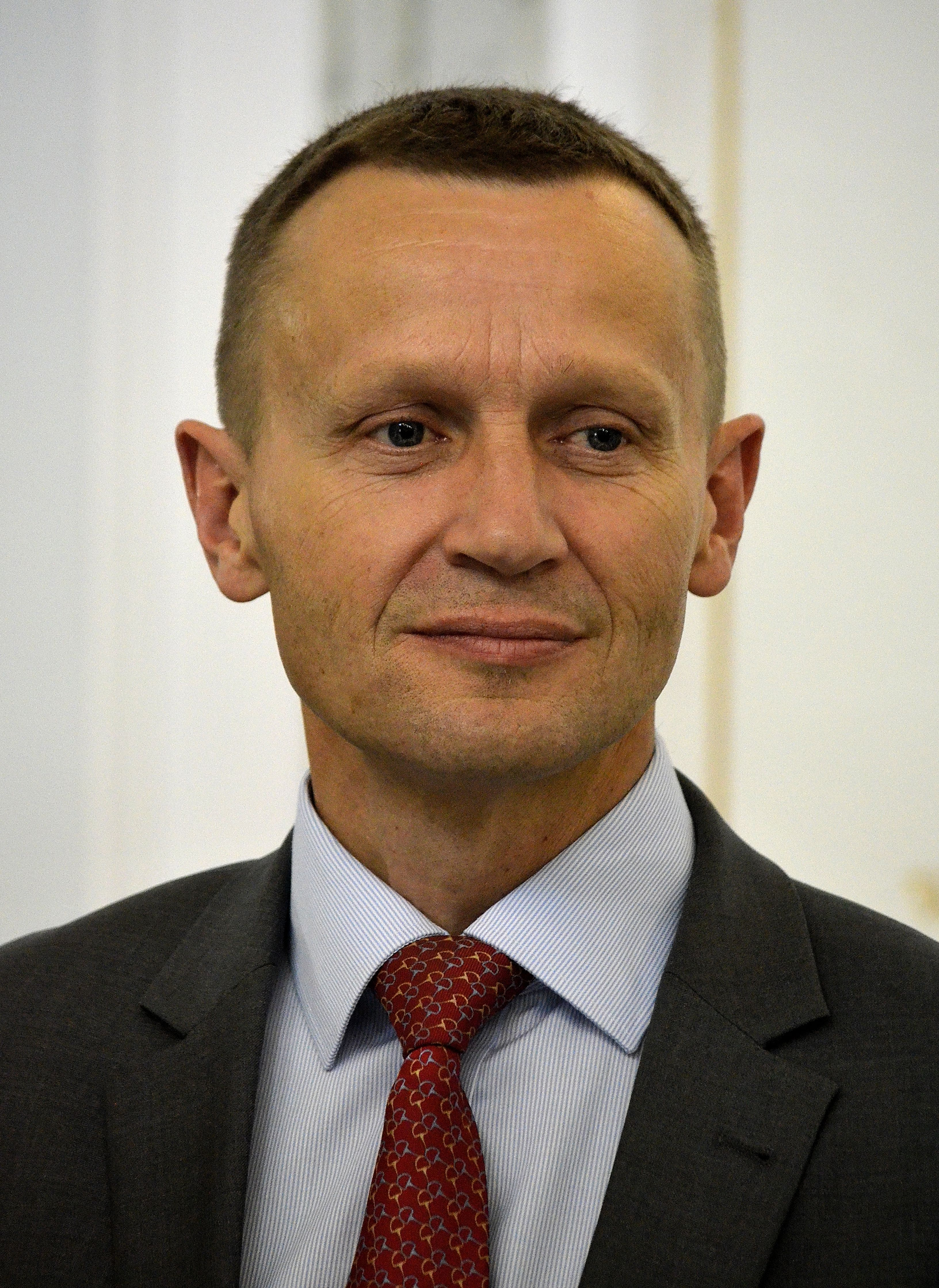
- Leśniak in 2015

Member of the Sejm
- In office 12 November 2015 – 11 November 2019
- Constituency: District No. 14

Personal details
- Born: Józef Krzysztof Leśniak; 6 March 1968; Limanowa, Poland
- Died: 4 May 2022 (aged 54)
- Political party: PiS
- Education: SGH Warsaw School of Economics

Józef Krzysztof Leśniak (6 March 1968 – 4 May 2022) was a Polish politician. A member of the Law and Justice party, he served in the Sejm from 2015 to 2019. He died on 4 May 2022, at the age of 54.
