= Grzegorz Matuszak =

Polish sociologist and politician (1941–2022)

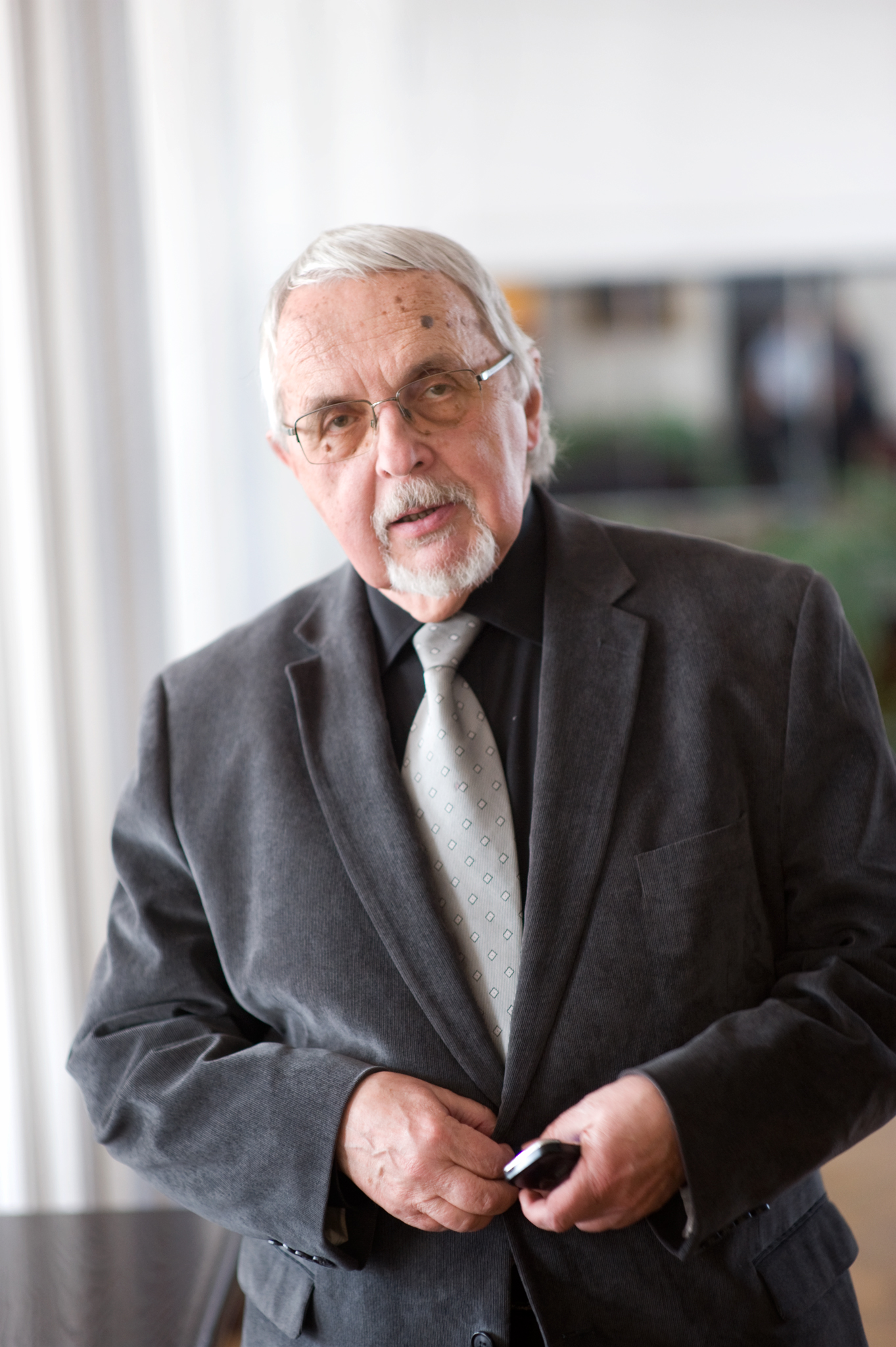
- Matuszak in 2013

Member of the Senate of Poland
- In office 19 October 2001 – 18 October 2005

Personal details
- Born: Grzegorz Jan Matuszak; 8 January 1941 Łódź, Reichsgau Wartheland, Nazi Germany
- Died: 13 September 2022 (aged 81)
- Party: SLD
- Education: University of Łódź; Wyższa Szkoła Nauk Społecznych
- Occupation: Sociologist

Grzegorz Jan Matuszak (8 January 1941 – 13 September 2022) was a Polish politician. A member of the Democratic Left Alliance, he served in the Senate of Poland from 2001 to 2005.

Matuszak died on 13 September 2022, at the age of 81.
