= Czesław Krakowski =

Polish politician (1950–2022)

Member of the Senate of Poland
- In office 14 October 1993 – 20 October 1997

Personal details
- Born: 7 June 1950 Płock, Poland
- Died: 21 January 2022 (aged 71) Płock, Poland
- Party: PSL

Czesław Krakowski (7 June 1950 – 21 January 2022) was a Polish politician. A member of the Polish People's Party, he served in the Senate of Poland from 1993 to 1997. He died in Płock on 21 January 2022, at the age of 71.
