= Andrzej Bujakiewicz =

Polish conductor (1939–2022)

- Born: 21 September 1939; Winna Góra, Greater Poland Voivodeship, Poland
- Died: 31 March 2022 (aged 82); Kalisz, Poland
- Occupation: Conductor

Andrzej Bujakiewicz (21 September 1939 – 31 March 2022) was a Polish conductor.

== Biography ==
Bujakiewicz was born in Winna Góra, Greater Poland Voivodeship. He attended the State Music High School in Poznań, where he began to learn about conducting. He worked as a teacher at the State Music High School in Poznań, from 1959 to 1965. Bujakiewicz served as assistant conductor for the Pomeranian Philharmonic from 1963 to 1964, and directed the choirs at the Nicolaus Copernicus University in Torun from 1965 to 1973. He also served as the conductor for the State Symphony Orchestra in Zielona Góra from 1967 to 1972. Bujakiewicz served as the director for the H. Melcer State Music School in Kalisz from 1973 to 2007.

Bujakiewicz worked as a lecturer at the Higher Teacher Training School in Zielona Góra from 1972 to 1973. In 1974, he established a school orchestra, in which he served as the artistic director. His school orchestra became the Kalisz Philharmonic. Bujakiewicz was honored with medals, such as Order of Polonia Restituta, Cross of Merit, Medal of the Commission for National Education, Meritorious Activist of Culture and Bronze Medal for Merit to Culture – Gloria Artis. In 1983, he was honored with the Honorary Badge of the City of Kalisz. Bujakiewicz was also honored with the Award of the President of the City of Kalisz in 2009.

Bujakiewicz died in March 2022 in Kalisz, at the age of 82.
