= Bogusław Litwiniec =

Polish theatre director and politician (1931–2022)

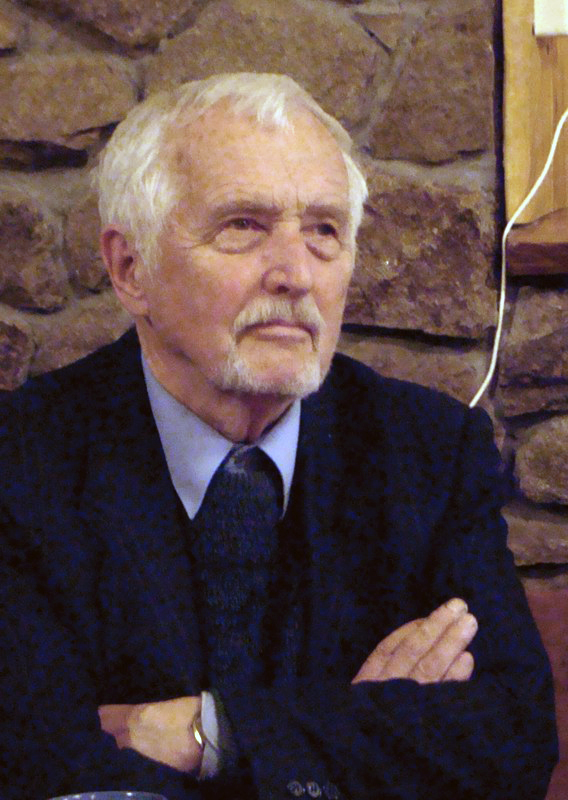
- Litwiniec in 2008

Member of the European Parliament
- In office 1 May 2004 – 19 July 2004
- Constituency: Poland

Member of the Senate of Poland
- In office February 2001 – 18 October 2005

Personal details
- Born: 1 November 1931 Ostróg, Poland
- Died: 25 December 2022 (aged 91) Wrocław, Poland
- Party: SLD; PPS
- Education: University of Warsaw
- Occupation: Theatre director

Bogusław Litwiniec (1 November 1931 – 25 December 2022) was a Polish theatre director and politician. A member of the Democratic Left Alliance, he served in the Senate of Poland from 2001 to 2005 and in the European Parliament from May to July 2004.

Litwiniec died in Wrocław on 25 December 2022, at the age of 91.
