= Stanisław Masternak =

Polish farmer and politician (1946–2022)

Stanisław Masternak MP

Member of Sejm
- In office 1993–2001

Starosta of Sandomierz County
- In office 2006–2018

Personal details
- Born: Stanisław Kazimierz Masternak; 22 February 1946; Samborzec, Poland
- Died: 16 August 2022 (aged 76)
- Political party: Polish People's Party

Stanisław Kazimierz Masternak (22 February 1946 – 16 August 2022) was a Polish farmer and politician. He served as a member of the Sejm from 1993 to 2001.

Born in Samborzec, Masternak attended the Technical School of Agricultural Mechanization before running a farm. He served as starosta for Sandomierz County from 2006 to 2018. Masternak was awarded the Gold Cross of Merit in 2004, and the Knight's Cross of the Order of Polonia Restituta in 2013.

Masternak died on 16 August 2022, at the age of 76.
