= Tadeusz Grygiel =

Polish basketball player (1954–2022)

Personal information
- Born: 6 February 1954
- Died: 9 May 2022 (aged 68)
- Listed height: 6 ft 4 in (1.93 m)
- Position: Shooting guard

Career history
- 1970–1983: Śląsk Wrocław

Tadeusz Grygiel (6 February 1954 – 9 May 2022) was a Polish basketball player. He played shooting guard for Śląsk Wrocław from 1970 to 1983.

== Awards ==
- Champion of the PLK (1977, 1979, 1980, 1981)
