= Andrzej Butra =

Polish veterinarian and politician (1961–2022)

Deputy Minister of Agriculture and Rural Development
- In office 16 March 2011 – 27 July 2012

Personal details
- Born: Andrzej Zbigniew Butra; 8 October 1961 Poland
- Died: 30 March 2022 (aged 60) Poland
- Party: PSL
- Education: Wrocław University of Environmental and Life Sciences
- Occupation: Veterinarian

Andrzej Zbigniew Butra (8 October 1961 – 30 March 2022) was a Polish veterinarian and politician. A member of the Polish People's Party, he served as Deputy Minister of Agriculture and Rural Development from 2011 to 2012. He died on 30 March 2022, at the age of 60.

== Biography ==
In 1985, he graduated from the University of Environmental and Life Sciences in Wrocław with a degree in veterinary studies. He completed postgraduate studies in veterinary administration and ethology at his alma mater, in internal control and auditing at the Opole University of Technology, and in agriculture and natural environment at the University of Opole. In 1992, he defended his doctoral thesis in veterinary medicine titled "Application of beta-adrenergic receptor blockers in the therapy of mammary gland inflammation and prevention of disorders in postpartum uterine involution in cows."

After graduation, until 1989, he worked at the Provincial Veterinary Institute in Opole, and then until 1990, at the State Agricultural Farm in Bierdzany. From 1990 to 2008, he ran a private veterinary practice specializing in animal reproduction. Simultaneously, he worked in financial companies and from 1992 to 1993 at the Animal Breeding and Insemination Station in Kluczbork. He also worked at the School-Kindergarten Complex and Gymnasium in Chocianowice. In 2002, he became the head of the county office at the Agency for Restructuring and Modernization of Agriculture in Kluczbork, and in 2007, he took the same position in the branch in Oleśno. From June 2008 to February 2011, he was the head of the field office of the Agricultural Market Agency in Kluczbork. From 2009 to 2011, he was also a reviewer for the Main Examination Commission on veterinary exam questions.

He became involved in the activities of the Polish People's Party. In 2012, he became the vice president of the party in the Opole district and the president of the party's structures in Kluczbork. He was elected to the Kluczbork county council in 2010, 2014, and 2018, and became its chairman.

On March 16, 2011, he was appointed Undersecretary of State in the Ministry of Agriculture and Rural Development. He was dismissed from this position on July 27, 2012, following the resignation of Minister Marek Sawicki and his deputies associated with the Polish People's Party. He later served as the president of the Opole branch of the Agency for Agricultural Real Estate until 2015 and then as the head of the Opole Agricultural Advisory Center in Łosiów until 2016. In 2015, he ran for the Senate in electoral district No. 51, receiving 7.86% of the vote and finishing fifth out of six candidates.
