= Marek Pasionek =

Polish government official and lawyer (1961–2022)

Undersecretary of State of the Chancellery of the Prime Minister of Poland
- In office 12 December 2005 – 25 May 2007

Deputy Public Prosecutor General
- In office 7 March 2016 – 31 March 2022

Personal details
- Born: Marek Waldemar Pasionek; 7 January 1961 Gliwice, Poland
- Died: 31 March 2022 (aged 61)
- Education: University of Silesia in Katowice
- Occupation: Lawyer

Marek Waldemar Pasionek (7 January 1961 − 31 March 2022) was a Polish lawyer and government official. He served as Deputy Public Prosecutor General from 2016 to 2022. Pasionek died on 31 March 2022, at the age of 61.
