= Marcin Kuszewski =

Polish hurdler

Personal information
- Nationality: Polish
- Born: 19 May 1977 (age 48)

Sport
- Sport: Track and field
- Event: 110 metres hurdles

Marcin Kuszewski (born 19 May 1977) is a Polish hurdler. He competed in the men's 110 metres hurdles at the 2000 Summer Olympics.
