= Adam Lepa =

Polish priest (1939–2022)

The Most Reverend Adam Lepa
- Auxiliary Bishop Emeritus of Łódź
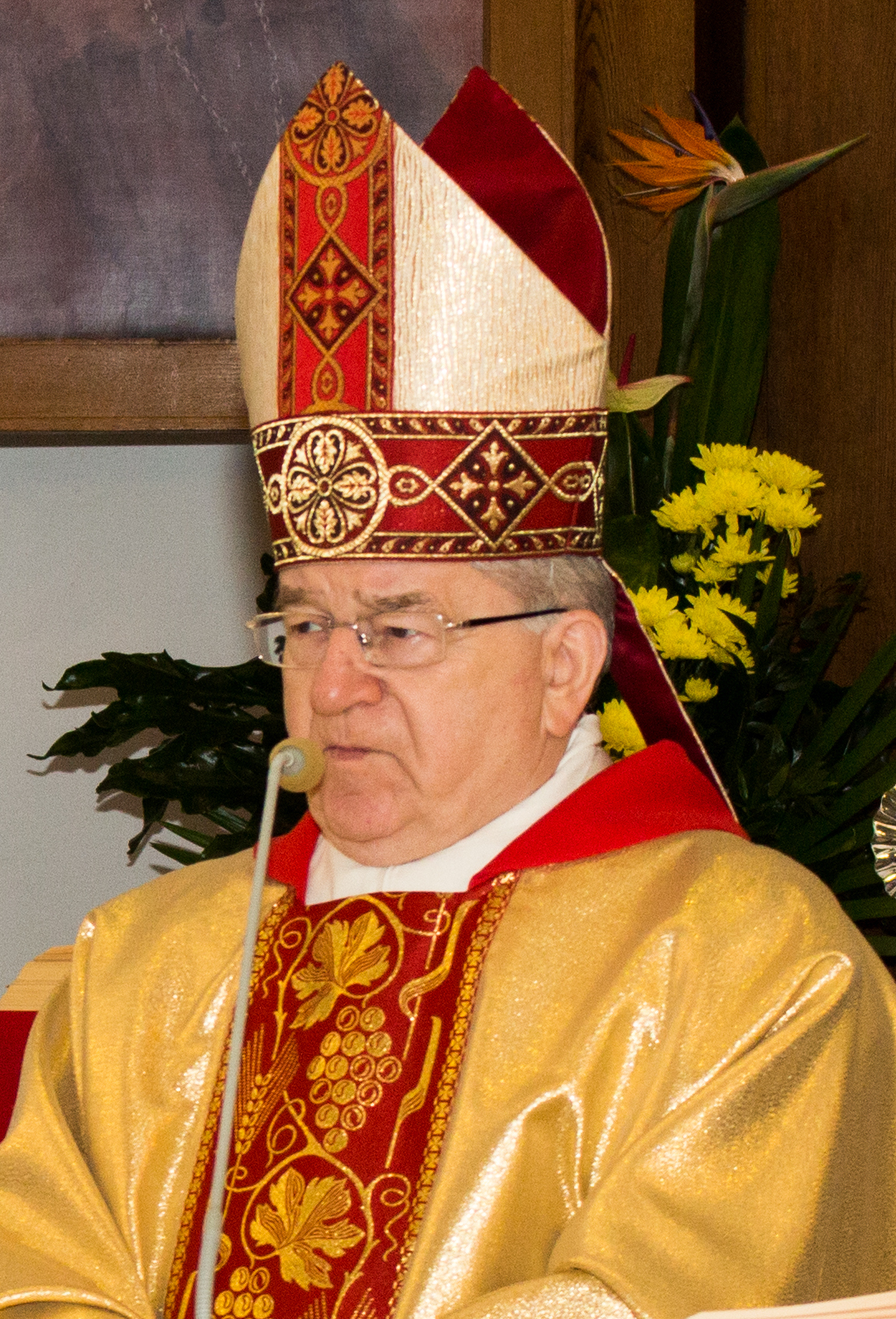
- Diocese: Łódź
- Appointed: 4 December 1987
- Term ended: 27 May 2014
- Other post: Titular Bishop of Regiana (1987–2022)

Orders
- Ordination: 18 March 1962 by Jan-Wawrzyniec Kulik
- Consecration: 2 January 1988 by Józef Glemp

Personal details
- Born: 17 March 1939 Łódź, Poland
- Died: 27 April 2022 (aged 83)

Adam Lepa (17 March 1939 – 27 April 2022) was a Polish Roman Catholic prelate.

Lepa was born in Poland and was ordained to the priesthood in 1962. He served as titular bishop of Regiana and as the auxiliary bishop of the Roman Catholic Archdiocese of Łódź, Poland, from 1988 until his retirement in 2014.

Catholic Church titles
Preceded by —	Auxiliar Bishop of Łódź; 1987–2014	Succeeded by —
Preceded by José Vicente Henriquez Andueza	Titular Bishop of Regiana; 1987–2022	Succeeded by Sede vacante
