= Ryszard Frąckiewicz =

Polish diplomat (1931–2022)

Polish Ambassador to Japan
- In office November 1986 – 1991
- Preceded by: Wojciech Chabasiński
- Succeeded by: Henryk Lipszyc

Polish Ambassador to Australia
- In office 27 April 1978 – 20 October 1983
- Preceded by: Eugeniusz Wiśniewski
- Succeeded by: Ireneusz Kossakowski

Personal details
- Born: 22 April 1931 Sielec, Polesie Voivodeship, Second Polish Republic
- Died: 1 April 2022 (aged 90)
- Party: PZPR
- Education: Main School of Planning and Statistics in Warsaw
- Occupation: Diplomat

Ryszard Frąckiewicz (22 April 1931 – 1 April 2022) was a Polish diplomat and an economist.

Ryszard Frąckiewicz in 1952 graduated from economics at the Main School of Planning and Statistics in Warsaw. He was student of Oskar Lange. From 1964 to 1969, he was a department director in the Polish Ministry of Foreign Affairs. He was a member of the Union of Polish Youth and, since 1953, of the Polish United Workers' Party (PZPR). As a diplomat he was posted in Washington, D.C. twice: ca from 1960 to 1964 and ca from 1970 to 1973. From 13 July 1971 to 23 December 1971 he was heading the Embassy as Chargé d'affaires. He served as ambassador of the Polish People's Republic to Australia from 1978 to 1983 and was also accredited to New Zealand. Between 1986 and 1991 he was ambassador to Japan.

He died on 1 April 2022 at the age of 90, and was buried in Warsaw.

== Works ==
- Baturo, Ryszard; Frąckiewicz, Ryszard; Natorf, Włodzimierz; Rozalicz, Kazimierz (1977). Wybrane zagadnienia organizacji i techniki pracy dyplomatycznej (in Polish). Warszawa: Wyższa Szkoła Nauk Społecznych przy KC PZPR.
