= Józef Różański (politician) =

Polish politician (1931–2022)

Józef Rożański

Member of the Sejm
- In office 21 March 1976 – 31 August 1985

Personal details
- Born: 28 November 1931 Nowy Targ, Poland
- Died: 16 March 2022 (aged 90) Nowy Targ, Poland
- Party: PD
- Education: University School of Physical Education in Kraków

Józef Rożański (28 November 1931 – 16 March 2022) was a Polish politician. A member of the Alliance of Democrats, he served in the Sejm from 1976 to 1985. He died in Nowy Targ on 16 March 2022, at the age of 90.
