= Tadeusz Kowalczyk =

Polish farmer and politician (1933–2022)

Member of the Sejm
- In office 18 June 1989 – 31 May 1993

Personal details
- Born: 5 January 1933 Bieliny, Kielce Voivodeship, Poland
- Died: 15 May 2022 (aged 89)
- Party: KO "S"
- Education: University of Łódź
- Occupation: Farmer

Tadeusz Kowalczyk (5 January 1933 – 15 May 2022) was a Polish politician. A member of the Solidarity Citizens' Committee, he served in the Sejm from 1989 to 1993. He died on 15 May 2022 at the age of 89.
