= Bogdan Łysak =

Polish engineer and politician (1936–2022)

Member of the Sejm
- In office 25 March 1976 – 31 July 1985

Personal details
- Born: Bogdan Stanisław Łysak; 12 May 1936 Kielce, Poland
- Died: 16 December 2022 (aged 86)
- Party: SD
- Education: Wrocław University of Economics
- Occupation: Engineer

Bogdan Stanisław Łysak (12 May 1936 – 16 December 2022) was a Polish engineer and politician. A member of the Alliance of Democrats, he served in the Sejm from 1976 to 1985.

Łysak died on 16 December 2022, at the age of 86.
