= Piotr Pankanin =

Polish chemist and politician (1948–2022)

Member of the Sejm
- In office 19 September 1993 – 20 October 1997
- Constituency: Constituency No. 6

Member of the Senate of Poland
- In office 26 November 1991 – 31 May 1993
- Constituency: Bydgoskie Voivodeship

Personal details
- Born: Piotr Jerzy Pankanin; 16 May 1948 Złotów, Poland
- Died: 16 November 2022 (aged 74)
- Party: NSZZ „Solidarność” UP
- Education: Nicolaus Copernicus University in Toruń
- Occupation: Chemist

Piotr Jerzy Pankanin (16 May 1948 – 16 November 2022) was a Polish chemist and politician. A member of Solidarity and later the Labour Union, he served in the Senate from 1991 to 1993 and the Sejm from 1993 to 1997.

Pankanin died on 16 November 2022, at the age of 74.
