= Maria Nowak (economist) =

Polish economist (1935–2022)

Maria Nowak (27 March 1935 – 22 December 2022) was a Polish economist.

== Biography ==
Nowak was born on 27 March 1935. After getting her diploma for the London School of Economics, Nowak worked for the French Agency for Development and for the World Bank. Since the 1980s, she has been working in the field of micro-credit based on the model of the Grameen Bank of Bangladesh. Nowak founded the Association for the Rights to Economic Enterprise (ADIE).

Nowak served as President of ADIE and of the European Microfinance Network (EMN).

Nowak died on 22 December 2022, at the age of 87.
