= Marek Grabowski (politician) =

Polish doctor and politician (1950–2022)

Undersecretary of State to the Ministry of Health
- In office 5 September 2006 – 24 August 2007

Personal details
- Born: 8 February 1950 Częstochowa, Poland
- Died: 7 May 2022 (aged 72) Częstochowa, Poland
- Party: SLD; SRP
- Education: Medical University of Silesia
- Occupation: Doctor

Marek Grabowski (8 February 1950 – 7 May 2022) was a Polish doctor and politician. A member of Self-Defence of the Republic of Poland, he served as undersecretary of state to the Ministry of Health from 2006 to 2007. He died in Częstochowa on 7 May 2022 at the age of 72.
