= Gabriela Cwojdzińska =

Polish pianist and politician (1928–2022)

Member of the Senate of Poland
- In office 18 June 1989 – 25 November 1991

Personal details
- Born: Gabriela Teresa Goślińska; 21 February 1928 Poznań, Poland
- Died: 5 November 2022 (aged 94) Koszalin, Poland
- Party: KO "S" UD
- Education: Academy of Music in Kraków
- Occupation: Pianist

Gabriela Teresa Cwojdzińska (née Goślińska, 21 February 1928 – 5 November 2022) was a Polish pianist and politician. A member of the Solidarity Citizens' Committee and the Democratic Union, she served in the Senate from 1989 to 1991.

Cwojdzińska died in Koszalin on 5 November 2022, at the age of 94.
