= Adam Wolańczyk =

Polish actor (1936–2022)

- Born: 9 May 1936; Cieszanów, Poland
- Died: 3 June 2022 (aged 86)
- Education: Łódź Film School
- Occupation: Actor
- Years active: 1960–2007

Adam Wolańczyk (9 May 1936 – 3 June 2022) was a Polish actor.

== Biography ==
Wolańczyk graduated from the acting department of Łódź Film School in 1960. He appeared in Johnnie Waterman, directed by Jan Jakub Kolski, and Pan Tadeusz, directed by Andrzej Wajda. In 1989, he received the Silver Cross of Merit. In the final years of his career, he performed at the Teatr Dramatyczny im. Jerzego Szaniawskiego.

Adam Wolańczyk died on 3 June 2022 at the age of 86.
