= Zbigniew Senkowski =

Polish trade unionist and politician (1955–2022)

Member of the Sejm
- In office 20 October 1997 – 18 October 2001
- Constituency: Constituency No. 48

Personal details
- Born: 27 October 1955 Wałbrzych, Poland
- Died: 17 October 2022 (aged 66)
- Party: AWS
- Occupation: Trade unionist

Zbigniew Senkowski (27 October 1955 – 17 October 2022) was a Polish trade unionist and politician.

A member of Solidarity Electoral Action, he served in the Sejm from 1997 to 2001.

Senkowski died in October 2022, at the age of 66.
