= Zbigniew Łój =

Polish field hockey player (1945–2022)

Personal information
- Nationality: Polish
- Born: 4 August 1945 Donaueschingen, Allied-occupied Germany
- Died: 3 January 2022 (aged 76) Częstochowa, Poland

Sport
- Sport: Field hockey

Zbigniew Łój (4 August 1945 – 3 January 2022) was a Polish field hockey player. He competed in the men's tournament at the 1972 Summer Olympics. He died in Częstochowa on 3 January 2022, at the age of 76.
