= Marian Fuks (historian) =

Polish historian (1914–2022)

Marian Fuks (28 September 1914 – 23 October 2022) was a Polish historian specializing in the history of Polish Jews in Warsaw. He was director of the Jewish Historical Institute in the years 1968–1969 and 1971–1973 and one of the oldest men in Poland. Fuks died on 23 October 2022, at the age of 108.
