= Pawel Kwiek =

Polish photographer (1951–2022)

Paweł Kwiek
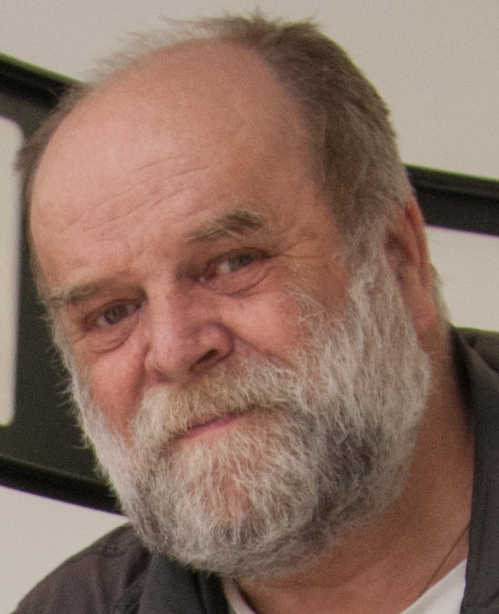
- Kwiek in 2014
- Born: Paweł Kwiek; 16 March 1951; Warsaw, Poland
- Died: 13 March 2022 (aged 70)
- Education: Leon Schiller National Higher School of Film, Television and Theatre PWSFTviT in Łódź; Academy of Fine Arts in Warsaw
- Known for: Photographer; cinematographer; lighting director
- Movement: Contemporary art

Paweł Kwiek (16 March 1951 – 13 March 2022) was a Polish contemporary visual artist, photographer, cinematographer, and lighting director. Kwiek worked with film, painting, photographic cycles and artistic actions. He was a participant in a wide array of exhibitions of Polish art in Poland and abroad and the author of theoretical texts about neo-avant-garde art. Kwiek was also a poet and a performer.

In 1973, Kwiek graduated from the Leon Schiller National Higher School of Film, Television and Theatre PWSFTviT in Łódź, Department of Direction of Photography and Television Production. Lecturer at the PWSTTviF in Łódź and the Academy of Fine Arts in Warsaw (in 1977–1978), Head of the Photography Department of the newspaper "Życie Warszawy" (1991). Lived and worked in Warsaw. Affiliation: Polish Filmmakers Association, creative group Workshop of the Film Form (until 1980), Association of Polish Art Photographers, Association of Artists of Other Art Forms (until 1994), MEDIA KONTAKT, "Jewish Motifs" Association. Co-founder of the Lodz-based avant-garde artistic group Workshop of the Film Form and member of the group in the 1970s. Around the same time that the Workshop came into being Kwiek created his famous project Face (Twarz, 1971), which criticised the regime of the 1st Secretary of the Polish Communist Party KC PZPR Władysław Gomulka (soon after he resigned from his office) and mocked the figure of the former 1st Secretary. In 1971, Kwiek worked with his brother Przemysław, Zofia Kulik and Jan S. Wojciechowski on the film Open Form (pol. Forma Otwarta), whose title marks a reference to the Open Form Theory conceived by Oskar Hansen with a view to "improving communication and social individualism".

Open Form was an experiment that explored the potential of such communication. Kwiek's film 1, 2, 3... Cinematographer's Exercises (1, 2, 3... ćwiczenia operatorskie, 1972) was spontaneous improvisation that challenges the activities of political organisations (Union of Socialist Youth) at the Film School in Łódź. Pawel Kwiek was one of the first in Poland to experiment with video (e.g. Video A, 1974; Video C, 1975). During the strike at the Film School in 1980, Kwiek recorded the film Solidary Waiting with Jacek Jozwiak. At the time, he was already a member of the Independent Self-governing Trade Union "Solidarity" and an activist of the Committee for the Renewal of the Film School (Ruch Odnowy Uczelni). After 13 December 1981, Kwiek was expelled from the Film School. One of the forerunners of video art, Kwiek worked with experimental film and video, photography, drawing. Author of manifestos and founder of artistic projects that borrow from other spheres of art, culture and related fields of knowledge: philosophy, cybernetics, poetry, sociology. Works by Paweł Kwiek belong to collections of the CCA Ujazdowski Castle in Warsaw, Museum of Modern Art in Warsaw, ERSTE Foundation in Vienna. As an artist, Kwiek is recognised as a representative of the Polish neo-avant-garde movement of the 1970s. Honoured with the Medal "150 Years of Polish Photography". Released in 2013, the trilingual book 1, 2, 3... Cinematographer's Exercises. Paweł Kwiek. Photography, Film, Video discusses Paweł Kwiek's work from the 1970s and includes essays by David Crowley, Marika Kuźmicz, Mark Nash and Łukasz Ronduda.

Kwiek died on 13 March 2022.

== Selected works ==
- 1, 2, 3... Cinematographer's Exercises (orig. pol: 1, 2, 3... ćwiczenia operatorskie, 1972) – experimental political film
- Niechcice (1973) – film made in the State Agricultural Farm of Niechcice
- A Poem about Consciousness (pol. Poemat o świadomości, 1977) – film features high school undergraduates
- Encounters with Light (Spotkania ze światłem, 1991) – photographic cycle

== Selected solo exhibitions ==
- 1979 – "Participation, Cognition, Decision" ("Uczestnictwo, poznanie, decyzja") – Mała Galeria, Warsaw;
- 1983 – "Revelation" ("Objawienie") – Mała Galeria, Warsaw;
- 1988 – "Ecumenism of Art" ("Ekumenizm sztuki") – Mała Galeria, Warsaw;
- 1989 – "Lech Wałęsa's Thought Forms" ("Myślokształty Lecha Wałęsy") – Mała Galeria, Warsaw;
- 1990 – "Spiritual Meeting Gifts. Hermetic Paintings" ("Pamiątki spotkań duchowych. Obrazy hermetyczne") – Centre for Contemporary Art Ujazdowski Castle, Warsaw;
- 1991 – "Meetings with Light" ("Spotkania ze światłem") – Mała Galeria, Warsaw;
- 1994 – "Between Water and Air" ("Pomiędzy wodą a powietrzem") – Mała Galeria, Warsaw;
- 2000 – "19 Photographs" ("19 fotografii") – Mała Galeria, Warsaw;
- 2008 – "Inter-Drawings" ("Międzyrysunki") – Galeria Senatorska, Warsaw; "Six Compositions" ("Sześć kompozycji") – Art NEW Media, Warsaw;
- 2010 – "Light – Love – Peace of Mind" ("Światło – miłość – spokój") – Centre for Contemporary Art Ujazdowski Castle, Warsaw.
