= Jan Budkiewicz =

Polish writer and politician (1934–2022)

Jan Budkiewicz MP

Member of the Sejm
- In office 19 September 1993 – 20 October 1997

Personal details
- Born: Jan Edward Budkiewicz; 19 May 1934 Warsaw, Poland
- Died: 2 August 2022 (aged 88) Warsaw, Poland
- Party: SLD
- Education: University of Warsaw; Łódź Film School
- Occupation: Publicist, screenwriter

Jan Edward Budkiewicz (19 May 1934 – 2 August 2022) was a Polish publicist, screenwriter, and politician. A member of the Democratic Left Alliance, he served in the Sejm from 1993 to 1997.

Budkiewicz died in Warsaw on 2 August 2022, at the age of 88.
