= Irène Kaufer =

Belgian activist and trade unionist (1950–2022)

- Born: 26 February 1950; Kraków, Poland
- Died: 5 November 2022 (aged 72); Brussels, Belgium
- Education: Université libre de Bruxelles
- Occupations: Activist; Trade unionist

Irène Kaufer (26 February 1950 – 5 November 2022) was a Polish author, feminist and LGBTQ+ activist, and trade unionist.

== Biography ==
Kaufer was born in Kraków on 26 February 1950 to Jewish parents who had escaped the Holocaust. The family moved to Brussels in 1958. In 1968, she studied psychology at the Université libre de Bruxelles. On 11 November 1972, she took part in the journée des femmes in Brussels, which began her feminist activism.

A member of the lesbian community, she commenced her activism with the group Biches Sauvages, which was later renamed Homo-L. She took part in the foundation of a women's house on Rue du Méridien 79 in Saint-Josse-ten-Noode.

After working for a cultural trade company for the majority of her career, Kaufer finished her career as a project manager at Garance, a non-profit organization dedicated to the prevention of gender-based violence and promotion of feminist self-defense. She regularly contributed to the feminist magazine Axelle, as well as occasionally to other publications.

Irène Kaufer died in Brussels on 5 November 2022, at the age of 72.

== Bibliography ==
- Fausses pistes (1996)
- Parcours féministes (2005)
- Déserteuses (2015)
- Dibbouks (2021)
