= Tekla Juniewicz =

Polish supercentenarian (1906–2022)

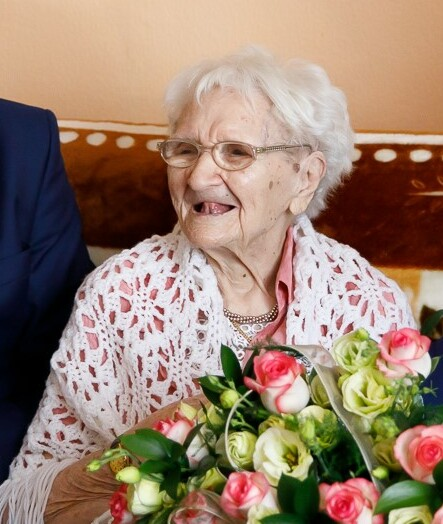
- Juniewicz in 2019
- Born: Tekla Dadak; 10 June 1906; Krupsko, Austria-Hungary
- Died: 19 August 2022 (aged 116 years, 70 days); Gliwice, Poland
- Burial place: Gliwice, Poland
- Known for: Oldest Polish person ever
- Spouse: Jan Juniewicz (m. 1927; died 1980)
- Children: 2

Tekla Juniewicz (née Dadak; 10 June 1906 – 19 August 2022) (Polish pronunciation: [ˈtɛkla juɲɛvit͡ʂ]) was a Polish supercentenarian who, living to the age of 116 years and 70 days, was the oldest living Polish person from 20 July 2017 until her death on 19 August 2022, and remains the oldest validated Polish person ever.

== Biography ==
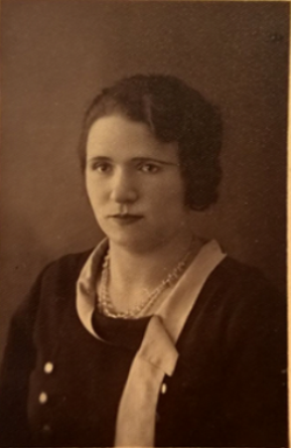
Juniewicz in the 1930s

=== Personal life ===
Tekla Juniewicz was born as Tekla Dadak on 10 June 1906 in Krupsko, then in Austria-Hungary but now in Ukraine. Her father, Jan Dadak, worked for Count Karol Lanckoroński, and her mother Katarzyna was a housewife who died during World War I. Juniewicz married Jan Juniewicz in 1927, with whom she had two children. They moved to Borysław, which was then a town in eastern Poland, but is now part of Ukraine. In 1945, when the area was annexed by the Soviet Union, she left the territory along with her husband and daughters and settled in Gliwice, formerly the German city of Gleiwitz.

=== Death ===
Juniewicz died on 19 August 2022, due to a stroke and heart complications. She was buried in Gliwice, the city in which she had lived for most of her life. The then-Prime Minister of Poland, Mateusz Morawiecki, attended the funeral. She was the last surviving validated person born in 1906.

== Family ==
Juniewicz had two daughters, five grandchildren, four great-grandchildren and four great-great-grandchildren.

== See also ==
- List of the verified oldest people
