= Homeland Defence Act =

Polish law

Sejm of the Republic of Poland
- Long title: Act of 11 March 2022, on the defence of the Fatherland
- Citation: Dz.U. 2022 poz. 655
- Territorial extent: Poland
- Passed by: Sejm
- Passed: 11 March 2022
- Enacted: 23 April 2022
- Signed by: Andrzej Duda
- Signed: 18 March 2022
- Status: In force

The Homeland Defence Act (Polish: Ustawa o obronie Ojczyzny), also known as the Act on the Defence of the Fatherland or the Act of 11 March 2022, on the defence of the Fatherland, is a Polish law intended to strengthen the Polish Armed Forces by increasing the number of active personnel to 300,000, increasing defence spending to 3% of GDP by 2023, modernizing the army and introducing voluntary basic military service.

== History ==
The bill has been signed into law in response to the 2022 Russian invasion of Ukraine with the leader of Poland's ruling Law and Justice party, Jarosław Kaczyński, stating that "Poland must have at its disposal the armed forces adequate to the kind of situation we have today – forces that will be able to fend off an attack and will be strong enough to prevent such an attack from happening." The defence minister of Poland Mariusz Błaszczak further declared that the ultimate aim is to increase the defence spending to 5% of GDP for Poland to have "the most powerful land forces in Europe."

In the spring of 2022, Poland negotiated a contract with the United States for 23 billion złoty (€4.9 billion) to purchase 250 Abrams tanks to replace the 240 Soviet-era tanks that were sent to Ukraine. Poland also struck a $4.6 billion contract for 32 F-35 fighters, adding to the F-16s already in service with its air force. Poland has recently committed a large portion of its military budget to Korean-made armaments, where it has signed a series of contracts to purchase tanks, planes, and other weaponry. Poland has placed an order with Korea for $10–$12 billion in military equipment. These contracts include the purchase of 218 K239 Chunmoo rocket launchers, 48 FA-50 light attack aircraft, 200 K9 Thunder howitzers, and 180 K2 Black Panther tanks. By the middle to late 2020s, the Koreans are expected to provide 1,000 K2 tanks and 600 K9 Howitzers, complementing the current supplies.
