= Krzysztof Kuszewski =

Polish epidemiologist and politician (1940–2022)

Minister of Health and Social Welfare
- In office 17 September 1997 – 17 October 1997
- Preceded by: Ryszard Jacek Żochowski
- Succeeded by: Wojciech Maksymowicz

Personal details
- Born: 19 July 1940 Opatów, General Government, Germany
- Died: 8 February 2022 (aged 81)
- Education: Wrocław Medical University
- Occupation: Epidemiologist

Krzysztof Kuszewski (19 July 1940 – 8 February 2022) was a Polish politician. He served as Minister of Health and Social Welfare from 17 September to 17 October 1997. He died on 8 February 2022 at the age of 81.
