= Voivode =

Historical Slavic noble title

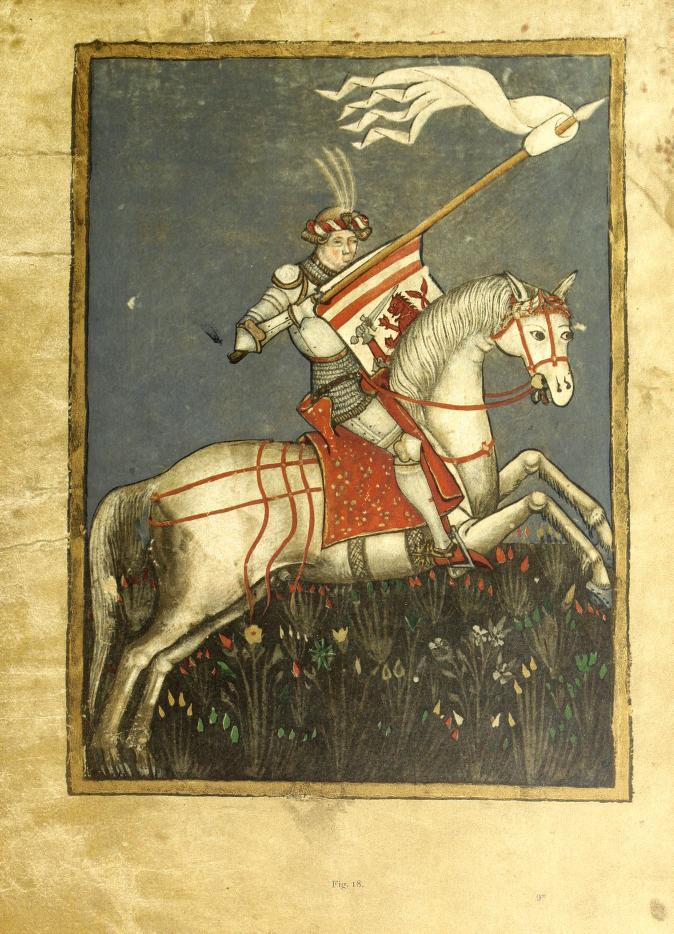
The voivode Hrvoje Vukčić Hrvatinić on horseback

Voivode (Note: German: Woiwode; German: [vɔɪ̯ˈvoːdə]; Czech: vévoda; Czech: [ˈvɛːvoda]; Serbo-Croatian: во̏јвода / vȍjvoda; IPA: [ʋôjʋoda]; Bulgarian: войво́да, romanized: vojvóda; IPA: [ʋôjʋoda]; Greek: βοεβόδας, romanized: voevódas; IPA: [vɔevˈoðas]; Hungarian: vajda; IPA: [ˈvɒjdɒ]; Macedonian: војвода, romanized: vojvoda; IPA: [ˈvɔjvɔda]; Romanian: voievod; IPA: [vo.jeˈvod]; Polish: wojewoda; IPA: [vɔ.jɛˈvɔ.da]; Russian: воево́да, romanized: vojevóda; IPA: [və(j)ɪˈvodə]; Ukrainian: воєво́да, romanized: vojevóda; IPA: [wɔjeˈwɔdɐ]; Ottoman Turkish: ویوده, romanized: voyvoda; IPA: [βoj.ˈβo.da]) (Note: /ˈvɔɪvoʊd/ VOY-vohd, /ˈvaɪvoʊd, ˈveɪ-/ V(A)Y-vohd) (Note: Also known as voivod, voievod, voevod, vaivode, voivoda, vojvoda, vaivada or wojewoda.) is a title denoting a military leader or warlord in Central, Southeastern and Eastern Europe, in use since the Early Middle Ages. It primarily referred to the medieval rulers of the Romanian-inhabited states and of governors and military commanders of Polish, Hungarian, Lithuanian, Balkan, Russian and other Slavic-speaking populations.

In the Polish–Lithuanian Commonwealth, voivode was interchangeably used with palatine. In the Tsardom of Russia, a voivode was a military governor. Among the Danube principalities, and in Bohemia, voivode was considered a princely title.

== Etymology ==
The term voivode comes from two roots. Church Slavonic: вой(-на), romanized: voj(-na), means "war, fight," while Church Slavonic: водя, romanized: vodya, means "leading", thus in Old Slavic together meaning "war leader" or "warlord". The Latin translation is comes palatinus for the principal commander of a military force, serving as a deputy for the monarch. In early Slavic, vojevoda meant the Latin: bellidux, lit. 'the military leader in battle'. The term has also spread to non-Slavic languages, like Hungarian (vajda), Romanian, and Albanian, in areas with Slavic influence.

== History ==
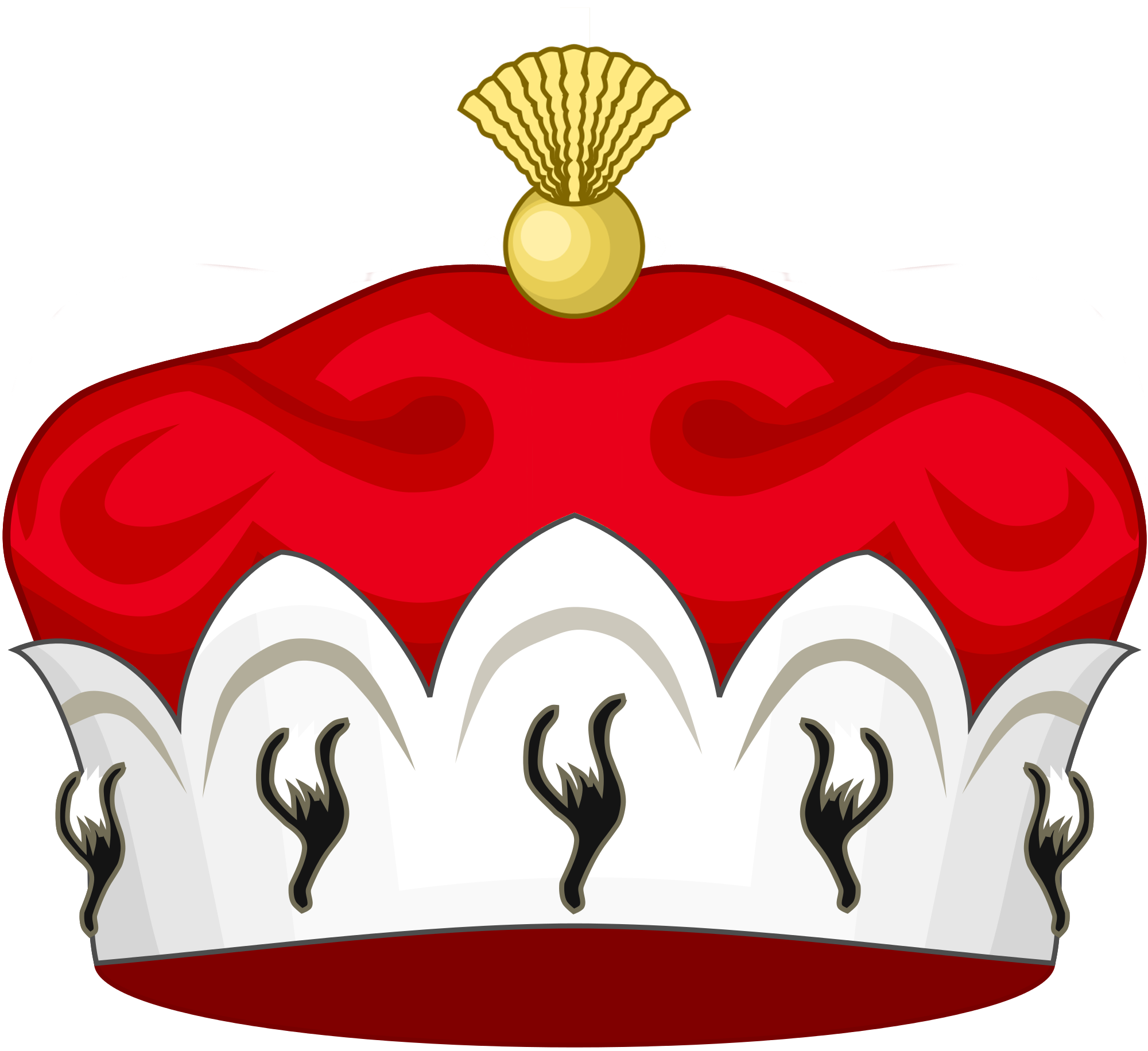
Voivode Hat (heraldry)

During the Byzantine Empire it referred to military commanders mainly of Slavic-speaking populations, especially in the Balkans, the Bulgarian Empire being the first permanently established Slavic state in the region. The title voevodas (Greek: βοεβόδας) originally occurs in the work of the 10th-century Byzantine emperor Constantine VII in his De Administrando Imperio, in reference to Hungarian military leaders.

The title was used in medieval Bohemia, Bosnia, Bulgaria, Croatia, Greece, Hungary, Macedonia, Moldavia, Poland, Rügen, Russian Empire, Ukraine, Serbia, Transylvania and Wallachia. In the Late Middle Ages the voivode, Latin translation is comes palatinus for the principal commander of a military force, deputising for the monarch gradually became the title of territorial governors in Poland, Hungary and the Czech lands and in the Balkans.

During the Ottoman administration of Greece, the Ottoman Voivode of Athens resided in the ancient Gymnasium of Hadrian.

The Serbian Autonomous Province of Vojvodina descends from the Serbian Vojvodina, with Stevan Šupljikac as Vojvoda or Duke, that became later Voivodeship of Serbia and Banat of Temeschwar.

== Title of nobility and provincial governorship ==
The transition of the voivode from military leader to a high ranking civic role in territorial administration (Local government) occurred in most Slavic-speaking countries and in the Balkans during the Late Middle Ages. They included Bulgaria, Bohemia, Moldavia and Poland. Moreover, in the Czech lands, but also in the Balkans, it was an aristocratic title corresponding to dux, Duke or Prince. Many noble families of the Illyricum still use this title despite the disputes about the very existence of nobility in the Balkans.

=== Bosnian grand dukes ===
Grand Duke of Bosnia (Serbo-Croatian: Veliki Vojvoda Bosanski; Latin: Bosne supremus voivoda / Sicut supremus voivoda regni Bosniae) was a court title in the Kingdom of Bosnia, bestowed by the king to highest military commanders, usually reserved for most influential and most capable among highest Bosnian nobility who already held title of vojvoda. To interpret it as an office post rather than a court rank could be even more accurate. Unlike usage in Western Europe, Central Europe, or in various Slavic lands from Central to North-East Europe, where analogy between grand duke and grand prince was significant, with both titles corresponding to sovereign lower than king but higher than duke. In Bosnia, the title grand duke corresponded more to the Byzantine military title megas doux. It is possible to register some similarities with equivalent titles in neighboring Slavic lands, such as Serbia; however, in neighboring countries, the title duke, in Slavic vojvoda, also had military significance, but in that sense "grand duke" was specifically, even exclusively, Bosnian title.

=== Ottoman Empire ===
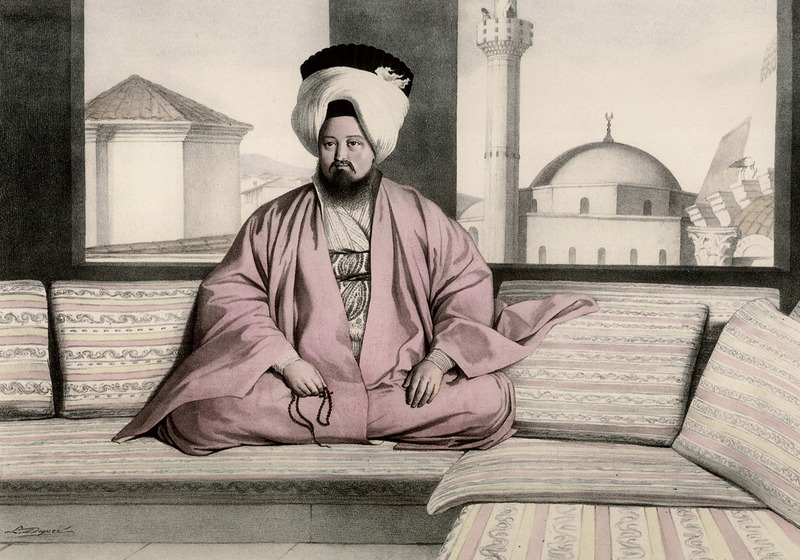
Mohammed Rushien Efendi, Ottoman Voivode of Athens, 1827

In some provinces and vassal states of the Ottoman Empire, the title of voivode (or voyvoda) was employed by senior administrators and local rulers. This was common to the extent in Ottoman Bosnia, but especially in the Danubian Principalities, which protected the northern borders of the empire and were ruled by the Greek Phanariotes. The title "Voyvoda" turned into another position at the turn of the 17th century. The governors of provinces and sanjaks would appoint someone from their own households or someone from the local elites to collect the revenues.

==== Ottoman Greece ====
The American diplomat Nicholas Biddle recorded in 1806 that chief Ottoman administrator of Athens was also called the voivode. One such holder of this title, Hadji Ali Haseki, was voivode on five separate occasions before his final banishment and execution in 1795 after angering both the Greek and Turkish residents of Athens and making powerful enemies at the Porte.

=== Polish–Lithuanian usage ===
==== Polish–Lithuanian Commonwealth ====
In 16th-century Poland and Lithuania, the wojewoda was a civic role of senatorial rank and neither (formally) heritable nor a title of nobility. His powers and duties depended on his location. The least onerous role was in Ruthenia while the most powerful wojewoda was in Royal Prussia. The role began in the crown lands as that of an administrative overseer, but his powers were largely ceremonial. Over time he became a representative in the local and national assemblies, the Sejm. His military functions were entirely reduced to supervising a mass mobilization and in practice he ended up as little more than overseer of weights and measures.

Appointments to the role were usually made until 1775 by the king. The exceptions were the voivodes of Polock and Vitebsk who were elected by a local poll of male electors for confirmation by the monarch. In 1791, it was decided to adopt the procedure throughout the country but the 18th-century Partitions of Poland put a stop to it. Polish voivodes were subject to the Law of Incompatibility (1569) which prevented them from simultaneously holding ministerial or other civic offices in their area.

==== Second Polish Republic ====
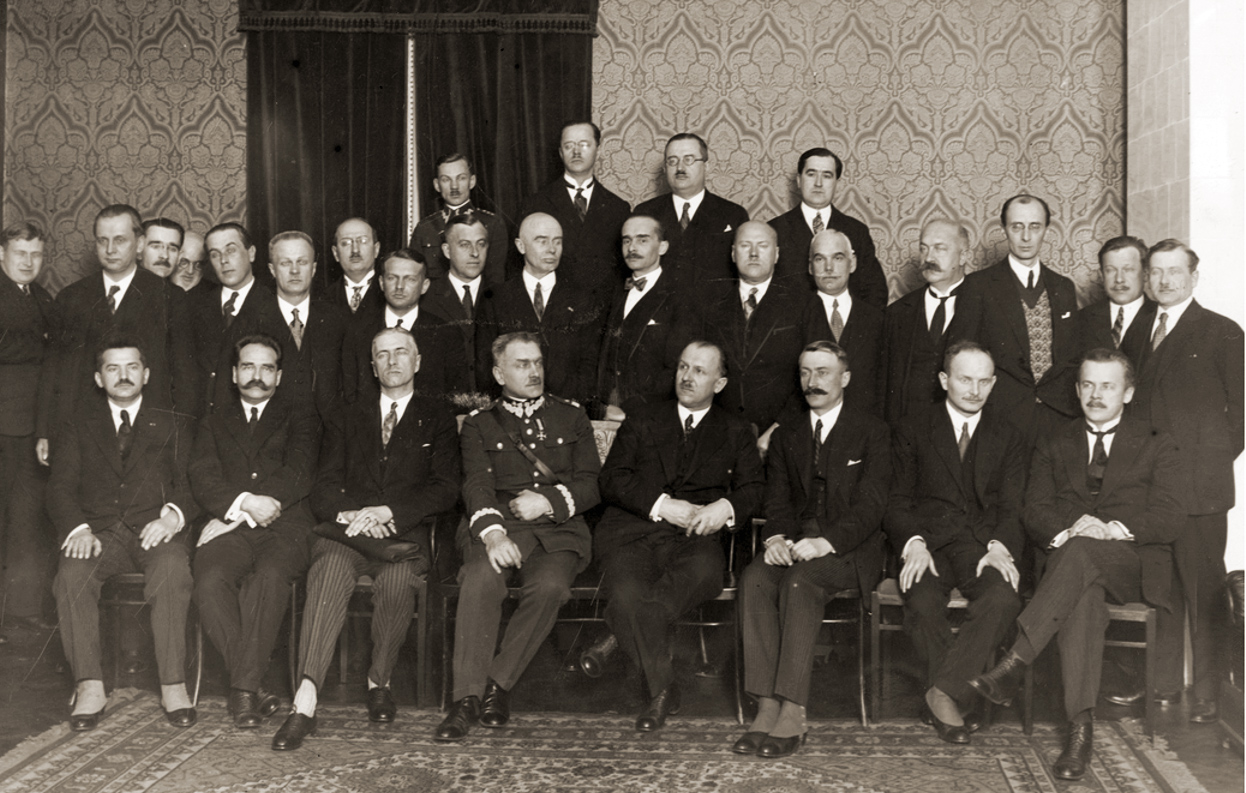
Meetings of the Voivodes in Warsaw, 1929

Following the declaration of independence and the establishment of the Second Polish Republic and its armed forces, the legal basis for establishing voivodeships and restoring the institution of the voivode was the Act of 2 August 1919. The Ordinance of the President of the Republic of Poland of 19 January 1928 did not depart from the voivodeships and the voivodes who headed them. Pursuant to the Act of 2 August 1919, the voivode retained a double position in the voivodeship: he was a representative of the central government in the voivodeship, as well as the head of the general administration bodies subordinated to him. As part of the first function, apart from representing the government at state ceremonies, the voivode was responsible for coordinating the activities of the entire state administration in the voivodeship in accordance with the basic political line of the government.The scope of the voivode was therefore broad and went beyond the area of matters belonging to the Ministry of the Interior. He also had the right to issue legal acts with force in the territory of the voivodeship.

His duties included carrying out the orders of individual ministers and taking care of all matters of state administration, excluding tasks falling within the competence of the military, judicial, fiscal, educational, railway, postal and telegraph administration and land offices. Since he had to take care of public security and order in the territory under his control, he was the head of the State Police, in certain situations he could declare a state of emergency and even request military assistance.

The process of organizing and unifying the territorial administration intensified in the 1920s, especially after the May Coup. Their culmination was the regulation of the President of Poland, Ignacy Mościcki, of 1928, on the organization and scope of operation of general administration authorities. This act stipulated that the general administration authorities in the regions were voivodes.

Confidential resolutions of the Council of Ministers issued on 6, 9, and 18 August 1923 established a catalogue of means of influence for the voivodes in relation to all non-combined branches. Since the main task of the voivode was still to ensure security and order, as well as the authority of the government, which required a strong position and quick decision-making, the Council of Ministers, by the regulation of 11 February 1924, enabled voivodes to independently shape the structure of offices subordinate to them and establish departments and divisions with the consent of the minister responsible for a given group of matters and the minister of internal affairs. Only the presidential and budget-economic departments mandatorily existed in each voivodeship office.

Contrary to the provisions of the Act of 1919, the competences of the voivode according to the new legislation was much more wide-ranging. It granted the voivode special supervisory and intervention powers in relation to non-combined administration (Polish: Administracja niezespolona). It could convene meetings of heads of non-combined administration bodies for the purpose of coordination their work from the point of view of the interests of the state, demand explanations from them in specific matters and suspend the enforcement of orders contrary to government policy, could also interfere in personnel matters of non-combined administration bodies.

The voivode was nominated by the president, personally subordinated to the minister of internal affairs, to the chairman of the Council of Ministers and to individual ministers. In cyclical reports, the voivodes informed among other things, the Ministry of Internal Affairs and other voivodes about the public mood and actions taken, paying attention mainly to the political activity opposed to the ruling camp. In the thirties, the voivode was responsible for the implementation of the goals and policies of the Sanation camp, hence this position was held by people belonging to the most loyal members of the ruling political group.

==== Polish People's Republic ====
===== 1944–1950 =====
The Polish Committee of National Liberation (PKWN) in its Manifesto of 22 July 1944, referred to the March Constitution of 1921, but at the same time stated that it exercises power through Voivodeship, Powiat, city and gmina national councils and through authorized representatives. Where national councils do not exist, democratic organizations are obliged to establish them immediately. According to the decree of the Polish Committee of National Liberation of 21 August 1944, these "authorised representatives" were voivodes and starostes. The provincial department (Polish: Wydział wojewódzki), introduced for the first time in Poland, was the executive body of the Voivodeship National Council. The chairman was the voivode or his deputy. Voivodes were initially appointed by the PKWN at the request of the minister of public administration. The Voivode was appointed and dismissed by the PKWN, from 31 December 1944, the Provisional Government did so at the request of the minister of public administration, and after the adoption of the Small Constitution of 1947 the President of Poland at the request of the minister of public administration in consultation with the president of the Council of Ministers after consulting the competent Voivodeship National Council. The dismissal of a voivode by the appointing authority required a request from the minister of public administration. The voivode's resignation could be demanded by the voivodeship national council on its own initiative or on the initiative of one of the poviat national councils.

The tasks of the voivode with the help of the voivodeship departments:

- Preparation of matters to be discussed by the voivodeship national council or its presidium;
- Deciding on all matters not reserved for the decision of the council or its presidium;
- Implementing the resolution of the council or its presidium;
- Performing, at the request of the council or its presidium, control over the activities of executive bodies of the lower level of self-government and state administration bodies;
- Exercising orderly authority over presidents, vice-presidents, members of city councils, and members of poviat departments;
- Perform other activities entrusted to it by the laws;
- Reporting on its activities to the presidium of the appropriate national council, at least once a month.

From 1946 the voivode was subjected to social control of the voivodeship national council and was obliged to submit periodic reports to it (actually the presidium) on the general line of his activities. The voivode ceased to be the chairman of the voivodeship national council, but due to the position he held, he was a member of the voivodeship national council. Instead, he was the chairman of the provincial government department (the executive body of the council and elected by it), reporting to the provincial national council in this regard. In according to statue of 20 March 1950, the institution of the Voivode was abolished and his competences was transferred to the Voivodeship National Council and it's presidium.

===== 1973–1990 =====
As part of the 1972-1975 administrative reform, the Voivode position was reintroduced according to the law published on 22 November 1973. receiving powers which were at the hands of the Presidium of the Voivodeship National Councils. Thus, the model of the collegial structure of administrative bodies was abandoned. Although the presidiums were left in the system of national councils, their role and position was reduced to the internal organ of the council, representing the council outside. Since the publishing of the law amending the Act on National Councils of 1973, departments and other organizational units previously subordinated directly to the Presidium of National Councils were transformed into a comprehensively recognized office (Polish: urząd) with the help of which the voivode was to perform his tasks as state administration body. The Voivodes were to be appointed by the Prime Minister following a consultation with the respective Voivodeship National Council. Their competencies included

- Undertake actions aimed at performing tasks resulting from the social and economic development plan of the country;
- Develop, on the basis of the guidelines of the Council of Ministers, draft plans for the socio-economic development of the area and draft budgets;
- Responsible for carrying out tasks resulting from these plans;
- Responsible for ensuring the proper use of funds allocated for "socio-economic development of the area and improvement of the living, educational, social and cultural conditions of the inhabitants";
- Coordinate the activities related to local economy of all state and cooperative units and social organizations, issuing recommendations regarding the implementation of tasks resulting from the socio-economic development plan of a given voivodeship;
- Control the performance of tasks specified in the socio-economic plan by state and cooperative units and social organizations;
- Undertake activities in the field of development of socialized and individual agriculture, tasks aimed at protecting the natural environment, ensuring cleanliness and order as well as fire and flood protection;
- Coordinate activities in the field of development of science, higher education and technology;
- Carry out the tasks entrusted by law in the field of state defense;
- Organize social forces and means for the protection of public order and security, supervise and control the activities of the Milicja Obywatelska and Volunteer Reserve of the Milicja Obywatelska in this regard, and issued orders to these bodies;
- Visit prisons and familiarized themselves with their conditions and made appropriate recommendations or applied to superior units.
- Ensure compliance of the operation of organizational units not subordinated to national councils with the socio-economic plan and the needs of the voivodeship. To support this, the voivode had the right to apply to the heads of these units for punishing, suspending or dismissing an employee who neglects his official duties, shows an inappropriate attitude towards people or violates work discipline. Secondly, the voivode had the right to suspend the head of an organizational unit not subordinated to the national council in "in the event of a gross violation of official duties causing serious social and economic damage".

The Voivode, providing conditions for the Voivodeship National Council to perform its statutory tasks, participated in its sessions and meetings of its presidium, ensured the implementation of the Voivodeship National Council resolutions and decisions of the presidium and submitted reports on their implementation, presented the WRN with draft plans for the social and economic development of the voivodeship and the budget, submitted reports from their implementation and cooperated with the presidium of the Voivodeship National Council in matters related to the implementation of the tasks of the presidium and the preparation of the council session, applied to the presidium to convene a session of the WRN and the subject of its deliberations. In addition, the voivode cooperated with the Voivodeship National Council committees and councillors, assisted them in the implementation of tasks, in maintaining communication with residents and the residents' self-government and in conducting control activities, and presented drafts of major ordinances and decisions to the WRN committees for consultation and informed about the implementation of the committee's conclusions.

Voivodes were served by voivodeship offices. The voivode could also perform some of his tasks with the help of "united field offices, enterprises, plants and institutions" subordinated to him. The functions and status of the voivode were clarified in January 1978 in the regulation of the Council of Ministers. The preamble to this act states, inter alia, that "the voivode, while performing his tasks in the field of managing the national economy in the voivodeship, is guided by the resolutions of the Polish United Workers' Party as the guiding political force of society in socialist construction. This regulation specified the basic rights and duties of the voivode as the representative of the government, the executive and managing body of the Voivodeship National Council and the local state administration body at the voivodeship level." An important competence of the voivode in this function was to exercise control over the implementation of voters' postulates and motions. The voivode, on the basis of the guidelines of the council of ministers, also prepared draft plans for the socio-economic development of the voivodeship and draft budgets, implemented the plan and budget adopted by the voivodeship national council and performed other tasks related to the comprehensive development of the voivodeship and meeting the needs of society, focusing on key problems, especially concerning the complex of agriculture and food economy, improving market supply, housing construction and housing management, as well as meeting the communal and living needs of the population.

It was also specified that the voivode performed and organized the performance of tasks in the voivodeship resulting from the provisions of generally applicable law, orders of the Prime Minister and resolutions of the WRN. Voivodes also controlled the performance by units subordinated and not subordinated to national councils of tasks resulting from laws and other acts of law. In this regard, they had the right to take the necessary decisions to ensure their full implementation.

In 1988 further regulations clarified the voivode's competences and tasks compared to the earlier regulations of 1975 and 1983. As the representative of the central government in the voivodeship, the voivode coordinated the work of all state administration bodies operating in the voivodeship in the field of meeting the needs of the population and socio-economic development of the area; organized control over the performance of state administration tasks in the voivodeship resulting from acts and ordinances, resolutions and orders of the chief state administration bodies; ensured the cooperation of organizational units operating in the voivodeship in the field of maintaining law and order, as well as preventing natural disasters and removing their effects. In addition, he was responsible for the ad hoc tasks commissioned by the council of ministers, the government presidium, the prime minister and the minister responsible for administration. Such a definition of competences constituted a qualitative change in relation to the amended regulation. Acting as a government representative, the voivode also represented the central authorities at state ceremonies and during official meetings in the voivodeship.

==== Modern Poland ====
===== 1991–1999 =====
The reactivation, by the Act of 8 March 1990, of a self-governing commune with legal personality, its own sphere of public tasks, its own authorities and territory, independent of other local bodies of state (government) administration, forced a new look at the role of the voivode as a local body of state administration. The legal position of the voivode after 1990 was in line with the territorial division of the country, where communes were the basic territorial division units, while the voivodeship was the basic territorial division unit for the performance of government administration. In this concept, the voivode as a body of general government administration, in particular:

- Manages and coordinated the work and ensured the conditions for the operation of the government administration in the voivodeship, voivodeship services and inspections and others provincial units;
- Supervises the activities of local government units to the extent and on the terms specified by laws;
- Issues decisions in individual cases in the field of government administration belonging to its properties;
- Represents the State Treasury on the terms and to the extent specified by statutes and exercised the powers and duties of the founding body towards state-owned enterprises;
- Publishes the provincial official journal;
- Issues orders in matters within its jurisdiction;
- Performs other tasks specified by law.

The voivode was also a higher-ranking authority within the meaning of the regulations of the Code of Administrative Procedure in relations to heads of regional offices of general government administration and local government bodies within the scope of commissioned government administration tasks carried out by these bodies.

The voivode, as a representative of the government, also performed tasks commissioned by the Council of Ministers. He had the right to issue recommendations to local government administration bodies operating in the voivodeship and, in particularly justified cases, he could suspend the activities of each body conducting administrative enforcement for a specified period of time. Special administration bodies and municipal bodies, within the scope of government administration tasks performed by them, were obliged to provide the voivode, at his request, with explanations in every case conducted in the voivodeship. The voivode also issued opinions on the appointment and dismissal of heads of special administration and appointed and dismissed, in consultation with the competent minister, heads of services, inspections and other organizational units. However, in relation to state-owned companies, the voivode issued opinions on candidates for members of supervisory bodies appointed by the representative of the state treasury and had the right to nominate candidates for members of the company's supervisory body.

The position of voivodes at that time was justified by the fact that there was no self-government voivodeship, and the administrative voivodeship was strictly governmental in nature and was headed by the voivode as the land manager, who, together with the local government assembly, represented the voivodeship outside. However, its position was not as strong as before 1990, because the Constitutional Act of 1992 clearly indicated that local government was the basic form of organizing local public life, while other types of local government units were to be defined by law. Also, the establishment of new bodies - financial supervision in the form of the Regional Chamber of Accounts and the Adjudication Committee and Boards of Appeals changed the scope of competences of voivodes.

Within the scope of his competence and competence, the voivode as a representative of the government and the representative of the state's interests could organize control of tasks in the field of government administration, defined detailed objectives of the government's policy in the voivodeship, adapted to local conditions, coordinated the cooperation of all organizational units of government and local government administration operating on in the area of the voivodeship in the field of preventing threats to human life and health, environmental threats, maintaining public order and state security, protecting civil rights, preventing natural disasters, preventing threats as well as combating and removing their effects. The voivode also coordinated tasks in the field of defense and state security in the voivodeship, represented the government at state ceremonies and performed other tasks commissioned by the Council of Ministers. The Small Constitution of 1992 did not assign any special tasks to the voivodes in the field of taking care of the development of the voivodeship or the development of its resources, because already then it was realized that the administrative division into 49 administrative units does not meet the requirements of the time and that the voivode is in fact not the host of region, but a representative of the Council of Ministers and, on its behalf, the Prime Minister.

===== 1999–present =====
The 1999 administrative reform in Poland reduced the numbers of voivodeships from 49 to 16 thus making each voivodeship much larger in size. This caused many discussions, also protests and conflicts and questions regarding the role of the voivodes in the system. The new act of 5 June 1998 on government administration in the voivodeship it was specified that the voivode is:

- Representative of the Council of Ministers in the voivodeship;
- Head of the combined government administration;
- A supervisory authority over local government units;
- A higher-level authority within the meaning of the provisions on administrative proceedings.

The voivode, as a representative of the Council of Ministers, was responsible for implementing the government's policy. The voivode's powers also included issuing orders binding on all government administration bodies, and in emergency situations also binding on the bodies of local government units. The voivode could also, in particularly justified cases, suspend the activities of each body conducting administrative enforcement for a specified period of time. On the other hand, the non-combined administration bodies (Polish: Administracja niezespolona) were obliged to agree with the voivode on the drafts of local law enacted by them, in order to ensure compliance of their activities with the voivode's orders and to submit annual information to the voivode on their activities in the voivodeship. In addition, the voivode's competences included all matters in the field of government administration not reserved for other bodies and supervision over the activities of local government units, representing the State Treasury in relation to state property and exercising other powers resulting from representing the State Treasury and exercising the powers and duties of the founding body towards state-owned enterprises. The voivode, at the request of the staroste, with the opinion of the competent head of the combined service, inspection or voivodeship guard, could create, transform and liquidate organizational units constituting the auxiliary apparatus of the heads of powiat services, inspections and guards, unless separate provisions provided otherwise. Governor could appoint and dismiss the heads of combined services, inspections and guards voivodeships, except for Voivodeship Police Commander, who was appointed after consultation opinion of the voivode.

In addition, the voivode has powers and responsibilities regarding defense in the voivodeship, as specified in the Homeland Defence Act:

- Defines detailed directions of action for the heads of combined services, inspections and guards, and non-combined administration bodies and local government units in the implementation of defense tasks;
- Manages the implementation of projects related to increasing the state's defense readiness carried out by marshals of voivodeships, starostes, commune heads (mayors, presidents of cities), entrepreneurs and other organizational and social organizations based in the voivodeship;
- Coordinates the undertakings necessary to secure the mobilization of military units and the provision of defense services;
- Manages the implementation of projects related to the preparation of management positions for local authorities;
- Organizes the use of local forces and resources for the needs of the defense of the state and the area of the voivodship, including protecting the population, material and cultural goods against means of destruction, as well as providing assistance to the injured;
- Controls and evaluates the performance of defense tasks by authorities, entities, entrepreneurs and organizational units;
- Organizes public education on defense preparation and conducts defense training and exercises.

In 2001 the powers and competences of the voivodes was reduced as some of their authority was transferred to the Voivodeship sejmik.

Voivodes continue to have a role in local government in Poland today, as authorities of voivodeships and overseers of self-governing local councils, answerable not to the local electorate but as representatives/emissaries of the central government's Council of Ministers. They are appointed by the Chairman of the Council of Ministers and among their main tasks are budgetary control and supervision of the administrative code.

== Military rank ==
Home Guard

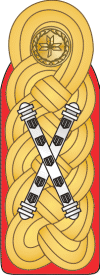
Air Force

Insignia of Vojskovodja

(1901–1918)

(1918–1945)

Epaulettes for the rank Voivode (Kingdom of Serbia and Kingdom of Yugoslavia)

=== Independent State of Croatia ===
Following the Axis occupation of Yugoslavia, the rank of Vojvoda was continued in the Independent State of Croatia as Vojskovodja. The rank was used by both the Croatian Home Guard and the air force.

=== Serbia and Yugoslavia ===
In the Kingdom of Serbia and its later iteration, the Kingdom of Yugoslavia, the highest military rank was Vojvoda. After the Second World War, the newly formed Yugoslav People's Army stopped using the royal ranking system, making the name obsolete.

== Bibliography ==
- Bjelajac, Mile (2004). Generali i admirali Kraljevine Jugoslavije 1918–1941. Belgrade: Institut za novu istoriju Srbije. ISBN 8670050390.
- Franz Ritter von Miklosich (1886). Etymologisches Wörterbuch der slavischen Sprachen. W. Braumüller. p. 393.
- Konstantin Jireček; Vatroslav Jagić (1912). Staat und gesellschaft im mittelalterlichen Serbien: studien zur kulturgeschichte des 13.15. jahrhunderts. In Kommission bei Alfred Hölder.
- Sychowicz, Krzysztof; Wasilewski, Jarosław, eds. (2019). Wojewodowie białostoccy 1919–1944 (in Polish). Instytut Pamięci Narodowej. ISBN 978-83-8098-689-3.
- Béla Köpeczi, ed. History of Transylvania, vol. I., 411, 457. (archived URL)
- voivode. (n.d.). Webster's Revised Unabridged Dictionary. Retrieved 15 November 2007, from Dictionary.com
- F.Adanir, "Woywoda", The Encyclopaedia of Islam (XI: 215 a)
- M. Kokolakis, "Mia autokratoria se krisi, Kratiki organosi-Palaioi Thesmoi-nees prosarmoges" [An Empire in Crisis: State Organization – Old Institutions – New Adjustments], in Istoria tou neou ellinismou, Vol. 1, publ. Ellinika Grammata, Athens 2003, p. 49.
