= Piotr Drzewiecki (footballer) =

Polish footballer (1950–2022)

Personal information
- Full name: Piotr Karol Drzewiecki
- Date of birth: 29 April 1950
- Place of birth: Chorzów, Poland
- Date of death: 17 March 2022 (aged 71)
- Place of death: Langenfeld, Germany
- Height: 1.75 m (5 ft 9 in)
- Position: Defender

Senior career*
Years	Team	Apps	(Gls)
1969–1980	Ruch Chorzów	231	(3)

International career
1974	Poland	3	(0)
- * Club domestic league appearances and goals

Piotr Karol Drzewiecki (29 April 1950 – 17 March 2022) was a Polish footballer who played as a defender. He made three appearances for the Poland national team in 1974.

He died in March 2022.

== Honours ==
Ruch Chorzów

- Ekstraklasa: 1973–74, 1974–75, 1978–79
- Polish Cup: 1973–74
