= Tadeusz Bartczak =

Polish chemist (1935–2022)

- Born: 28 July 1935; Warsaw, Poland
- Died: 13 August 2022 (aged 87); Łódź, Poland
- Education: Lodz University of Technology
- Scientific career
- Fields: Chemistry, crystallography
- Workplaces: Lodz University of Technology

Tadeusz Bartczak (28 July 1935 – 13 August 2022) was a Polish chemist and professor at the Lodz University of Technology.

In 1957, he obtained a master's degree in chemical engineering at the Faculty of Chemistry, Technical University of Lodz. In 1955, he started working at the Department of Inorganic Chemistry at the Technical University, in co-operation with professor, Edward Józefowicz. In 1965, he was awarded a doctoral degree. In the academic year 1969/1970, he worked at the Oxford University with professor, Dorothy Crowfoot Hodgkin—a Nobel Prize laureate. In the same year, he was nominated as a member of the Oxford University and a member of the Linacre College. He was a student of professor, Zdzisław Gałdecki. From 1982 to 1984, he worked at the University of Notre Dame and the Northwestern University in the United States. In 1986 he obtained his PhD; in 1997, he was awarded the title of professor, and full professor in 2001.

A specialist in crystal chemistry and X-ray structural analysis, his achievements included 80 publications. He also promoted four doctors.

From 1990 to 1993, he was the vice dean, and from 1993 to 1999 the head of doctoral studies of the Faculty of Chemistry at Technical University of Lodz. From 1997 to 2000, he was the president of Crystal Chemistry Division of the Chemical Society.

Bartczak died on 13 August 2022, at the age of 87.
