= Deaths in February 2022 =

The following is a list of notable deaths in February 2022.

Entries for each day are listed alphabetically by surname. A typical entry lists information in the following sequence:

- Name, age, country of citizenship at birth, subsequent country of citizenship (if applicable), reason for notability, cause of death (if known), and reference.

== February 2022 ==
=== 1 ===
- Sergei Anashkin, 60, Kazakh footballer (national team).
- Brian Augustyn, 67, American comic book editor and writer (The Flash, Gotham by Gaslight, Justice League), stroke.
- Isaac Bardavid, 90, Brazilian actor and voice actor, pulmonary emphysema.
- Walter Barylli, 100, Austrian violinist.
- Jan Callewaert, 65, Belgian businessman.
- Rustica Carpio, 91, Filipino actress (Captive) and playwright.
- Heo Cham, 72, South Korean radio and television presenter and singer.
- Bud Clark, 90, American politician, mayor of Portland, Oregon (1985–1992), heart failure.
- Fred Cook, 74, Australian footballer (Footscray, Yarraville, Port Melbourne).
- Paul Danahy, 93, American politician, member of the Florida House of Representatives (1966–1974).
- Remi De Roo, 97, Canadian Roman Catholic prelate, bishop of Victoria (1962–1999).
- Ramendra Chandra Debnath, 66, Indian politician, renal failure.
- James Douglas, 89, Scottish composer and conductor.
- Lotfollah Safi Golpaygani, 102, Iranian Marja', secretary of the Guardian Council (1980–1985), cardiac arrest.
- Paolo Graziosi, 82, Italian actor (China Is Near, Italian Race, Pinocchio), COVID-19.
- Robin Herman, 70, American writer and journalist (The New York Times), ovarian cancer.
- James R. Hildreth, 94, American major general.
- Juan Iglesias Marcelo, 90, Spanish politician, mayor of Cáceres (1983–1987) and senator (1982–2000), multiple organ failure.
- Shintaro Ishihara, 89, Japanese novelist and politician, governor of Tokyo (1999–2012), minister of transport (1987–1988), pancreatic cancer.
- Wilfrido Lucero, 86, Ecuadorian politician, prefect of Carchi Province (1970–1974), member (1979–1990, 1998–2007) and two-time president of the National Congress.
- Easton McMorris, 86, Jamaican cricketer (West Indies, national team).
- Laurie Mithen, 87, Australian footballer (Melbourne).
- Stanisław Olejniczak, 83, Polish Olympic basketball player (1964).
- Antonio Ortega Franco, 80, Mexican Roman Catholic prelate, auxiliary bishop of México (2004–2019).
- Leslie Parnas, 90, American cellist.
- Wolfgang Schwanitz, 91, German intelligence official, head of the Stasi (1989–1990).
- Harriet S. Shapiro, 93, American lawyer, heart failure.
- Tito Stagno, 92, Italian journalist.
- Joe Stephens, 86, American politician, Mayor of Saginaw, Michigan (1977–1979), brain and lung cancer.
- Ellen Tiedtke, 91, German actress (Ohne Pass in fremden Betten, The Fiancee), cabaret artist and singer.
- Richard L. Tierney, 85, American writer, poet and literary scholar (H. P. Lovecraft).
- Larry Warner, 76, American politician, member of the Texas House of Representatives (1987–1991).
- Glenn Wheatley, 74, Australian entertainment executive, talent manager (Little River Band, John Farnham) and musician (The Masters Apprentices), complications from COVID-19.
- Maurizio Zamparini, 80, Italian football executive, owner of Palermo (2002–2018), complications from peritonitis.
- Jon Zazula, 69, American record label executive, founder of Megaforce Records.

=== 2 ===
- Djilali Abdi, 78, Algerian footballer (national team).
- Hanna Abu-Hanna, 93, Palestinian poet and writer.
- Adnan Abu Odeh, 88, Jordanian politician, minister of culture (1970–1972) and senator (1974–1982).
- Gajanan Dharmshi Babar, 78, Indian politician, MP (2009–2014), complications from COVID-19.
- Alberto Baillères, 90, Mexican businessman, chairman of Grupo BAL (since 1959).
- J. Alexander Baumann, 79, Swiss politician, MP (1995–2011), heart attack.
- Georges Bertin, 73, French sociologist.
- Robert Blalack, 73, Panamanian-born American visual effects artist (Star Wars, RoboCop, The Day After), Oscar winner (1978), cancer.
- Frank Bradford, 80, American politician, member of the Georgia House of Representatives (1997–1999).
- Ivano Comba, 61, Italian footballer (Sant'Angelo, Piacenza, Rondinella).
- Ramesh Deo, 93, Indian actor (Anand, Aap Ki Kasam, Mere Apne), heart attack.
- Joe Diorio, 85, American jazz guitarist.
- Jim Donoahue, 87, Canadian graphic designer (Government of Canada wordmark, TSN).
- Arthur Feuerstein, 86, American chess player.
- Steve Finney, 48, English footballer (Swindon Town, Carlisle United, Chester City).
- Bill Fitch, 89, American Hall of Fame basketball coach (Cleveland Cavaliers, Boston Celtics, Houston Rockets), NBA champion (1981).
- Ed Foreman, 88, American politician, member of the United States House of Representatives (1963–1965, 1969–1971).
- Ezio Frigerio, 91, Italian costume designer and art director (Cyrano de Bergerac).
- Olivier Léonhardt, 58, French politician, senator (since 2017), cancer.
- Amir Locke, 22, American musician, shot.
- Pablo Manzoni, 82, Italian makeup artist, complications from back surgery.
- Paul F. McMillan, 65, British chemist.
- Jan Netopilík, 85, Czech Olympic long jumper (1960).
- Irén Pavlics, 87, Hungarian-Slovenian writer.
- Ralph Presley, 91, American politician, member of the Georgia House of Representatives (1992–1993).
- Roy Purdon, 94, New Zealand harness racing trainer (Christopher Vance, Chokin, Petite Evander).
- Sophie Rieger, 88, German politician, member of the Landtag of Bavaria (1990–1998).
- Gloria Rojas, 82, American television journalist (Eyewitness News, Like It Is).
- Tilden Santiago, 81, Brazilian politician, MP (1991–2003), complications from COVID-19.
- Bill Short, 84, American baseball player (New York Yankees, Baltimore Orioles, New York Mets).
- Wolfgang Stuck, 82, German tennis player.
- László Szigeti, 64, Slovak politician, minister of education (2006).
- Mosese Taga, 57, Fijian rugby union player (national team).
- Noel Treacy, 70, Irish politician, TD (1982–2011), European affairs minister (2004–2007).
- Klaas Tuinstra, 76, Dutch politician, MP (1986–1994).
- Monica Vitti, 90, Italian actress (L'Avventura, The Girl with the Pistol, The Pizza Triangle), complications from Alzheimer's disease.
- Paul Willen, 93, American architect.
- Penelope Windust, 76, American actress (You Don't Mess with the Zohan, Murder, She Wrote, V).
- Jochen Wolf, 80, German politician, member of the Landtag of Brandenburg (1990–1994).
- Hamid Zouba, 86, Algerian football player and manager (national team).

=== 3 ===
- Lauro António, 79, Portuguese film director (Morning Undersea), producer and screenwriter.
- Georges Athanasiadès, 92, Swiss organist and choirmaster.
- Chorobek Baigazakov, 75, Kyrgyz politician, deputy (1990–1995).
- Mickey Bass, 78, American bassist, composer and arranger.
- Herbert Benson, 86, American medical doctor and cardiologist, kidney failure.
- James Billings, 89, American operatic soprano.
- Renée Pietrafesa Bonnet, 83, Uruguayan composer and pianist.
- Manuel Bromberg, 104, American artist.
- Harry Carmean, 99, American artist.
- Lani Forbes, 34, American author, neuroendocrine cancer.
- Donny Gerrard, 75, Canadian singer (Skylark), cancer.
- Douglas Goldhamer, 76, American rabbi, founder of the Hebrew Seminary.
- Joseph Hitti, 96, Lebanese-born Australian Maronite Catholic eparch.
- Alex Ingram, 77, Scottish footballer (Queen's Park, Ayr United, Nottingham Forest), complications from dementia.
- Tom Kiernan, 83, Irish rugby player (Munster, Lions, national team).
- Dieter Mann, 80, German actor (Der letzte Zeuge, Downfall, 13 Semester), complications from Parkinson's disease.
- Iwao Matsuda, 84, Japanese politician, member of the House of Councillors (since 1998), hypoglycemia.
- Anthony J. Mercorella, 94, American politician, member of the New York State Assembly (1966–1972) and New York City Council (1973–1975).
- Madis Milling, 51, Estonian television and radio presenter and politician, MP (since 2015).
- Antonio Miró, 74, Spanish fashion designer.
- Martin B. Moore, 84, American politician, member of the Alaska House of Representatives (1971–1972), COVID-19.
- Mike Moore, 80, American baseball executive, president of the National Association of Professional Baseball Leagues (1991–2007).
- Janė Narvilienė, 76, Lithuanian politician, MP (2000–2004).
- Erna Paris, 83, Canadian author.
- Frank Pietrzok, 57, German politician, member of the Bürgerschaft of Bremen (1999–2005), paragliding accident.
- Bob Proctor, 87, Canadian self-help author and lecturer.
- Abu Ibrahim al-Hashimi al-Qurashi, 45, Iraqi Islamic militant, leader of the Islamic State (since 2019), suicide by explosion.
- Sir Duncan Rice, 79, Scottish academic.
- Jarosław Marek Rymkiewicz, 86, Polish writer and literary critic.
- John Sanders, 76, American baseball player (Kansas City Athletics) and coach (Nebraska Cornhuskers), cancer.
- Christos Sartzetakis, 92, Greek judge and politician, president (1985–1990), acute respiratory failure.
- Bill Stevenson, 88, Canadian football player (Calgary Stampeders).
- Maggie Tlou, South African politician, MP (since 2019).
- Ludmila Vaňková, 94, Czech writer.
- Jan op den Velde, 90, Dutch Olympic rower.
- Francisco Raúl Villalobos Padilla, 101, Mexican Roman Catholic prelate, bishop of Saltillo (1975–1999), COVID-19.
- Felipe Virzi, 79, Panamanian politician and businessman, second vice president (1994–1999).
- Evelyn Wawryshyn, 97, Canadian baseball player (Muskegon Lassies, Fort Wayne Daisies).
- Dean Zayas, 83, Puerto Rican actor, director, and playwright.

=== 4 ===
- FRM Nazmul Ahasan, 66, Bangladeshi lawyer and jurist, judge of the Bangladesh Supreme Court, Appellate Division (since 2022), COVID-19.
- Thomas A. Ban, 92, Hungarian-born Canadian psychiatrist, stroke.
- Emília Barreto, 87, Brazilian beauty queen, Miss Brazil (1955).
- Nancy Berg, 90, American model and actress (Fail Safe).
- Tibor Bodnár, 66, Hungarian Olympic sports shooter (1976, 1980).
- Sergio Bravo, 72, Chilean screenwriter (Romané, La Doña) and lyricist ("Chile, la alegría ya viene").
- Peter Brideoake, 76, Australian musician and composer.
- Ashley Bryan, 98, American children's author and illustrator (Freedom Over Me).
- Davie Cattanach, 75, Scottish footballer (Falkirk, Celtic, Stirling Albion).
- Oscar Chaplin III, 41, American Olympic weightlifter (2000, 2004).
- Kerry Chater, 76, Canadian musician (Gary Puckett & The Union Gap) and songwriter.
- Leland Christensen, 62, American politician, member of the Wyoming Senate (2011–2019), complications from COVID-19.
- Avern Cohn, 97, American jurist, judge of the U.S. District Court for Eastern Michigan (since 1979).
- Jason Epstein, 93, American editor and publisher.
- Neil Faulkner, 64, British archaeologist, historian, and writer, blood cancer.
- Gianluca Floris, 57, Italian writer and bel canto singer.
- Vasyl Folvarochnyi, 81, Ukrainian novelist, poet and journalist.
- Rolando Gonçalves, 77, Portuguese footballer (Porto, national team).
- Don Johnston, 85, Canadian politician, MP (1978–1988) and secretary-general of the OECD (1996–2006).
- Kim In-hyeok, 26, South Korean volleyball player.
- Georges Labazée, 78, French politician, senator (2011–2017).
- Ana Carmen Macri, 105, Argentine politician, deputy (1952–1955).
- Zolani Marali, 44, South African lightweight boxer.
- Kyle Mullen, 24, American football player (Yale).
- Olcay Neyzi, 94, Turkish pediatrician.
- Srboljub Nikolić, 56, Serbian football player (HNK Šibenik, FK Bor) and manager (Jasenica).
- Dóra Ólafsdóttir, 109, Icelandic centenarian, oldest living Icelander (since 2019).
- Jerzy Osiatyński, 80, Polish politician, deputy (1989–2001) and minister of finance (1992–1993).
- Paul Overgaard, 91, American politician, member of the Minnesota House of Representatives (1963–1969) and Senate (1971–1973).
- Robert Owens, 75, American politician, member of the Massachusetts House of Representatives (1973–1975).
- Pierre Petit, 92, Martinican politician, deputy (1993–2002).
- Colin Quinn, 40, Irish Gaelic footballer (Louth).
- Peetam Ram, 71, Indian politician, Uttar Pradesh MLA (1996–2007, 2012–2017), complications from COVID-19.
- Gene Ransom, 65, American basketball player (Golden State Warriors), shot.
- Julie Saul, 67, American art gallerist, leukemia.
- Sonia Chalif Simon, 96, American art historian.
- Üner Tan, 84, Turkish neuroscientist and evolutionary biologist.

=== 5 ===
- Rayan Aourram, 5, Moroccan child. (death announced on this date)
- Christel Apostel, 86, German politician, landrat of Wesel (1994–1996).
- Mavie Bardanzellu, 83, Italian actress (Beatrice Cenci, The Battle of Sinai, Shadows Unseen).
- Martin Barnes, 83, British civil engineer.
- Santonio Beard, 41, American football player (Alabama Crimson Tide), shot.
- Kenneth H. Brown, 85, American novelist and playwright (The Brig).
- John Bryson, 86, Australian author.
- Victor Buturlin, 75, Russian film director (Applause, Applause..., The Gardener) and screenwriter.
- Chandupatla Janga Reddy, 86, Indian politician, MP (1984–1988).
- Cho Soon-seung, 92, South Korean politician, MP (1988–2000).
- Geoff Crewdson, 83, English rugby player (Keighley, Hunslet, national team).
- Rubén Fuentes, 95, Mexican classical violinist and composer.
- David Fuller, 80, American politician, member of the Montana Senate (1983–1987), COVID-19.
- Todd Gitlin, 79, American sociologist and author, cardiac arrest complicated by COVID-19.
- Angélica Gorodischer, 93, Argentine writer.
- Guo Pingtan, 89, Chinese politician, member of the National People's Congress (1983–1988).
- Wayne Hankey, 77, Canadian religious philosopher.
- Per Christian Hemmer, 88, Norwegian physicist.
- John Honderich, 75, Canadian newspaper publisher and editor (Toronto Star), heart attack.
- Damodar Hota, 86, Indian classical vocalist, musicologist and composer.
- Emanuel Hurwitz, 86, Swiss psychoanalyst and politician, member of the Cantonal Council of Zürich (1979–1984).
- Raymond A. Jordan, 78, American politician, member of the Massachusetts House of Representatives (1975–1994).
- Ian Kennedy, 89, British comics artist (Dan Dare, Ro-Busters, Judge Dredd).
- Anne R. Kenney, 72, American archivist.
- Ivan Kučírek, 75, Czech Olympic cyclist (1964, 1968, 1972).
- Roy Lambert, 88, English footballer (Rotherham United).
- Vijaya Malalasekera, 76, Sri Lankan cricket player (Cambridge University) and administrator.
- Fernando Marías, 63, Spanish writer.
- Boris Melnikov, 83, Russian fencer, Olympic champion (1964).
- Josh Muir, 30, Australian artist.
- Christian Nau, 77, French land sailor.
- Bruce William Nickerson, 80, American civil rights and gay rights attorney.
- Kenta Nishimura, 54, Japanese novelist.
- Abdizhamil Nurpeisov, 97, Kazakh writer and translator.
- Leili Pärnpuu, 72, Estonian chess player.
- Ananda Prasad, 94, Indian-born American biochemist.
- Tom Prince, 52, American professional bodybuilder.
- Ernst Sabila, 89, Belarusian Protestant religious leader.
- Ibrahim Sutar, 81, Indian social worker.
- Warren Woodcock, 85, Australian tennis player.
- Anani Yavashev, 89, Bulgarian actor (Rio Adio, We Were Young).

=== 6 ===
- Angiolo Bandinelli, 94, Italian politician, deputy (1986–1987).
- Haven J. Barlow, 100, American politician, member of the Utah House of Representatives (1952–1955) and senate (1955–1994).
- Sigal G. Barsade, 56, Israeli-American business theorist and researcher, glioblastoma.
- Horst Bertl, 74, German footballer (Hannover 96, Borussia Dortmund, Hamburger SV).
- Yahya Butt, 60, Pakistani bodybuilder.
- Maria Carrilho, 78, Portuguese politician, MP (1995–1999, 2005–2009) and MEP (1999–2004).
- Chang Feng, 98, Chinese actor (If I Were for Real, The Coldest Winter in Peking, Shanghai 13).
- Jerome Chazen, 94, American businessman and philanthropist.
- Ed Cooke, 86, American football player (New York Titans/Jets, Denver Broncos, Miami Dolphins).
- Héliodore Côté, 87, Canadian politician.
- George Crumb, 92, American composer (Ancient Voices of Children, Black Angels, Makrokosmos), Pulitzer Prize (1968) and Grammy winner (2001).
- Charles B. Deane Jr., 84, American lawyer and politician, member of the North Carolina Senate (1971–1975).
- Gary DeLaune, 88, American sportscaster, complications from COVID-19.
- Jean-Pierre Gredy, 101, French playwright.
- Ronnie Hellström, 72, Swedish footballer (Hammarby, 1. FC Kaiserslautern, national team), esophageal cancer.
- Sandy Hucul, 88, Canadian ice hockey player and coach (Phoenix Roadrunners).
- Syl Johnson, 85, American blues and soul singer ("Is It Because I'm Black", "Take Me to the River").
- Abram Khasin, 98, Russian chess international master and correspondence grandmaster.
- Günther Knauss, 78, German Olympic ice hockey player (1968).
- Ryszard Kubiak, 71, Polish rowing coxswain, Olympic bronze medallist (1980).
- Lata Mangeshkar, 92, Indian playback singer (Parichay, Kora Kagaz, Lekin...), composer and politician, MP (1999–2005), complications from COVID-19.
- Kazuhiko Masumoto, 85, Japanese politician, member of the House of Representatives (1972–1976), bile duct cancer.
- Frank McAtamney, 87, New Zealand rugby union player (Otago, national team).
- Lin Meiring, 88, South African Olympic swimmer.
- Abdelmalek Ali Messaoud, 66, Algerian footballer (USM Alger, USM Annaba, national team).
- Alice Moretti, 100, Swiss politician, member of the Grand Council of Ticino (1971–1987).
- Hans Neuenfels, 80, German writer, theatre director, and opera director, COVID-19.
- Eleanor Owen, 101, American journalist and mental health professional.
- Frank Pesce, 75, American actor (Midnight Run, Beverly Hills Cop II, Maniac Cop), complications from dementia.
- Sayyid Al-Qemany, 74, Egyptian writer and philosopher.
- Azita Raji, 60, Iranian-born American diplomat, banker, and philanthropist, ambassador to Sweden (2016–2017), metastatic breast cancer.
- Vi Redd, 93, American jazz saxophonist.
- Wanda Robson, 95, Canadian civil rights activist.
- Zdzisław Jan Ryn, 83, Polish psychiatrist and diplomat, ambassador to Chile (1991–1997) and Argentina (2007–2008).
- Raymond C. Smith, 78, American rear admiral.
- Wolfgang Stammler, 84, German politician, member of the Landtag of Hesse (1995–1997).
- Henry Thillberg, 91, Swedish footballer (Malmö, national team), heart failure.
- Ilmārs Verpakovskis, 63, Latvian footballer (FK Liepājas Metalurgs, RAF Jelgava, national team).
- John Vinocur, 81, American journalist and editor (The New York Times, International Herald Tribune), sepsis.

=== 7 ===
- Abhijatabhivamsa, 54, Burmese Buddhist monk, leukemia.
- Noel Allanson, 96, Australian footballer (Essendon) and cricketer (Victoria).
- Séamus Barron, 75, Irish hurler (Rathnure, Wexford).
- Jerzy Bartmiński, 82, Polish linguist and ethnologist.
- Bob Bruninga, 73, American electrical engineer, complications from sarcoma and COVID-19.
- Jacques Calonne, 91, Belgian artist.
- Chen Shih-yung, 73, Taiwanese politician, county magistrate of Chiayi (1989–1993).
- Boris Deich, 83, Ukrainian politician, MP (2002–2014), COVID-19.
- William H. Folwell, 97, American Episcopal prelate, bishop of Central Florida (1970–1989).
- Jakub Gurecký, 16, Czech motorcycle racer, training collision.
- Jason Heinrichs, 51, Canadian-born American musician and record producer.
- Ivan Hudec, 74, Slovak politician, minister of culture (1994–1998).
- Hans-Ulrich Klose, 86, German politician, member of the Landtag of North Rhine-Westphalia (1985–2005).
- Dan Lacey, 61, American painter, brain cancer.
- Margarita Lozano, 90, Spanish actress (Viridiana, A Fistful of Dollars, Napoleon and Me).
- Günter Maschke, 79, German political scientist.
- Miodrag Mitić, 62, Serbian Olympic volleyball player (1980).
- Jamal Al-Muhaisen, 72, Palestinian politician, governor of Nablus Governorate (2007–2009).
- Robert Mulcahy, 89, American college athletics administrator (Rutgers University).
- Zbigniew Namysłowski, 82, Polish jazz musician and composer.
- Gustav Ortner, 86, Austrian diplomat, ambassador to the Holy See (1997–2001).
- Bruce Owen, 90, Canadian lawyer and politician, member of the Legislative Assembly of Ontario (1987–1990), heart attack.
- Kristine Raahauge, 72, Greenlandic municipal politician, activist, eskimologist and writer
- Bushra Rahman, 77, Pakistani writer and politician, MNA (2002–2013) and Punjab MPA (1985–1990).
- Andrzej Rapacz, 73, Polish Olympic biathlete (1972, 1976).
- Sir Christopher Slade, 94, British judge, Lord Justice of Appeal (1982–1991).
- Praveen Kumar Sobti, 74, Indian Olympic hammer and discus thrower (1968, 1972) and actor (Mahabharat), heart attack.
- William A. Tiller, 92, Canadian-born American materials scientist.
- Bruno Trani, 94, Italian Olympic sailor (1960).
- Douglas Trumbull, 79, American special effects supervisor (2001: A Space Odyssey, Blade Runner) and film director (Silent Running), complications from mesothelioma.
- Dick Young, 84, American football coach.
- Fábio Zambiasi, 55, Brazilian footballer.

=== 8 ===
- Arnaldo Arocha, 85, Venezuelan politician, deputy (1969–1974, 1984–1989) and twice governor of Miranda.
- Mervyn Banting, 84, English Anglican priest, archdeacon of the Isle of Wight (1996–2003).
- Sérgio Barcelos, 78, Brazilian politician, deputy (1991–2003).
- Miriam Beerman, 98, American painter.
- Javier Berasaluce, 91, Spanish footballer (Deportivo Alavés, Racing de Santander, Real Madrid).
- Joe B. Cannon, 87, American politician.
- M. E. Chamberlain, 89, British historian.
- Mark H. Collier, American religious scholar and academic administrator, president of Baldwin–Wallace College (1999–2006).
- George Spiro Dibie, 90, American cinematographer (Night Court, Growing Pains, Sister, Sister), five-time Emmy winner.
- Borivoj Dovniković, 91, Croatian film director, animator and caricaturist.
- Leonid Filimonov, 86, Russian politician, Soviet minister of oil and gas industry (1989–1991) and Tomsk deputy (1997–2001).
- Dottie Frazier, 99, American diver.
- Boris Furmanov, 85, Russian politician, minister of architecture, construction and housing (1991–1992).
- Bamber Gascoigne, 87, British television presenter (University Challenge) and author (The Great Moghuls).
- Igor Gubskiy, 67, Ukrainian artist.
- Ricky Hunter, 85, Canadian professional wrestler (NWA, WWF).
- Klaus Immer, 97, German politician, MP (1972–1987).
- Charlotte Thomson Iserbyt, 91, American freelance writer and policy advisor.
- Jean-Henri Jaeger, 78, French surgeon and academic.
- Aleksandr Kashtanov, 93, Russian agronomist and politician, member of the Supreme Soviet of the Russian SFSR (1971–1980).
- Oshadie Kuruppu, 27, Sri Lankan badminton player, leukemia.
- Krzysztof Kuszewski, 81, Polish epidemiologist and state official, under-secretary of state (1994–1997) and acting minister of health (1997).
- Bill Lienhard, 92, American basketball player (Kansas Jayhawks), Olympic champion (1952).
- Donald Cyril Lubick, 95, American attorney and tax policy expert.
- Andrée Michel, 101, French sociologist and activist.
- Rosalind Miles, 82, American actress (Shaft's Big Score!, The Black Six, Friday Foster).
- Luc Montagnier, 89, French virologist, Nobel Prize laureate (2008).
- Mick Newman, 89, Canadian-born English footballer (West Ham United, Dartford, Dagenham).
- Valentina Polukhina, 85, Russian-British literary scholar.
- Jackie Robinson, 94, American basketball player, Olympic champion (1948).
- Hélio Rosas, 92, Brazilian politician, deputy (1987–1999).
- Gerhard Roth, 79, Austrian writer.
- David Rudman, 78, Russian-American sambo wrestler.
- Cliff Sander, 90, Australian Olympic footballer (1956).
- Daniel Sili, 91, Brazilian Olympic water polo player.
- Herbert Thalhammer, 66, Austrian politician.
- John Q. Trojanowski, 75, American neuroscientist.
- Toshiya Ueda, 88, Japanese voice actor (The Adventures of Pepero, Rascal the Raccoon, The Promised Neverland).
- Makoto Watanabe, 85, Japanese diplomat, grand chamberlain (1996–2007).
- Götz Werner, 78, German businessman, co-founder of dm-drogerie markt.
- Gerald Williams, 55, American baseball player (New York Yankees, Atlanta Braves, Tampa Bay Devil Rays), cancer.

=== 9 ===
- Rudy Abbott, 81, American baseball coach (Jacksonville State Gamecocks), complications from COVID-19.
- Jim Angle, 75, American journalist (Fox News).
- Abune Antonios, 94, Eritrean Orthodox prelate, patriarch of the Eritrean Orthodox Tewahedo Church (2004–2006).
- Vladimir Belkov, 80, Russian football player (Tekstilshchik Ivanovo) and manager (Avtoagregat Kineshma, Spartak-Telekom Shuya).
- Fannie Birckhead, 86, American community organizer and politician.
- David Botwinik, 101, Lithuanian-born Canadian composer.
- Alan Brinn, 81, English rugby union player.
- Valerio Carrara, 70, Italian politician, senator (2001–2013).
- William Childress, 89, American author (Out of the Ozarks, An Ozark Odyssey) and poet.
- Betty Davis, 77, American funk and soul singer, cancer.
- Candi Devine, 64, American professional wrestler (AWA).
- Johnny Ellis, 61, American politician, member of the Alaska House of Representatives (1987–1993) and Senate (1993–2017).
- Luz Odilia Font, 92, Puerto Rican actress.
- Jeremy Giambi, 47, American baseball player (Oakland Athletics, Kansas City Royals, Philadelphia Phillies), suicide by gunshot.
- Javier Gonzales, 55, American politician, mayor of Santa Fe (2014–2018), cancer.
- Friedbert Grams, 79, German politician, member of the Landtag of Mecklenburg-Vorpommern (1990–2002).
- Graham Harle, 90, British-born Canadian politician, Alberta MLA (1972–1986).
- George Harris, 81, English footballer (Watford, Reading).
- Alicia Hermida, 89, Spanish actress (Maribel and the Strange Family, Black Humor, El bosque animado).
- Joseph Horovitz, 95, Austrian-born British composer (Captain Noah and His Floating Zoo) and conductor.
- Fabio Duque Jaramillo, 71, Colombian Roman Catholic prelate, bishop of Armenia (2003–2012) and Garzón (since 2012).
- Harold R. Johnson, 68, Canadian lawyer and writer.
- La Verite, 4, Swedish racehorse.
- Ronald Lou-Poy, 87, Canadian lawyer and community leader.
- Jan Magiera, 83, Polish Olympic cyclist (1964, 1968).
- Ian McDonald, 75, English musician (King Crimson, Foreigner, Steve Hackett).
- Juan R. Melecio Machuca, 87, Puerto Rican lawyer, director of the Office of Legislative Services (1981–1988).
- Gustavo Mhamed, 45, Argentine footballer (Huracan) and coach (Quilmes AC), colon cancer.
- Yahya A. Muhaimin, 78, Indonesian politician, minister of national education (1999–2001).
- Peter Neilson, 67, English-born New Zealand politician, minister of works and development (1990) and MP (1981–1990).
- Nora Nova, 93, Bulgarian singer.
- Snežana Pantić, 43, Serbian karateka, breast cancer.
- Johnny Raper, 82, Australian Hall of Fame rugby league player (St. George, New South Wales, national team), complications from dementia.
- Kuli Roberts, 49, South African journalist, television presenter and actress (Angeliena).
- Ralph W. Sallee, 94, American meteorologist and naval officer.
- Reinhard Schwabenitzky, 74, Austrian film director (Parole Chicago, Tour de Ruhr), producer and screenwriter.
- Jaime Serra, 101, Portuguese politician, deputy (1976–1985).
- Mirian Shvelidze, 75, Georgian stage designer and painter.
- Super Muñeco, 59, Mexican professional wrestler.
- Kazuyoshi Torii, 75, Japanese manga artist and professor, pancreatic cancer.
- Jack Willis, 87, American journalist and filmmaker (The House of Mirth, Paul Jacobs and the Nuclear Gang), assisted suicide.
- André Wilms, 74, French actor (Juha, La Vie de bohème, Life Is a Long Quiet River).
- Paul A. Yost Jr., 93, American admiral, commandant of the Coast Guard (1986–1990).
- Ziad Al-Zaza, 66, Palestinian politician, COVID-19.

=== 10 ===
- Peter Awelewa Adebiyi, 78, Nigerian Anglican prelate, bishop of Owo (1993–1999) and Lagos West (1999–2013).
- Saleh Ajeery, 101, Kuwaiti astronomer.
- Piero Bellotti, 79, Italian Olympic wrestler (1968).
- Herb Bergson, 65, American politician, mayor of Duluth (2004–2008), complications from surgery.
- Sugnya Bhatt, 80, Indian jurist, judge of the Gujarat High Court (1994–1995), COVID-19.
- Evgeniya Brik, 40, Russian actress (Stilyagi, Yolki 1914, Friday), cancer.
- Paulo Carotini, 76, Brazilian Olympic water polo player (1964).
- Olivia Cajero Bedford, 83, American politician, member of the Arizona House of Representatives (2003–2011) and senate (2011–2019).
- Steve Cotter, 81, Canadian football player (BC Lions, Edmonton Eskimos).
- Henry Danton, 102, British classical dancer.
- Elizabeth Dickson, British lawn bowler. (death announced on this date)
- Ken Dixon, 92, British confectioner (Rowntree's).
- Dale Doig, 86, American teacher and politician, mayor of Fresno, California (1985–1989).
- Bruce Duffy, 70, American author, brain cancer.
- Mary Ellen Duncan, 80, American academic administrator, president of the State University of New York at Delhi (1991–1998) and Howard Community College (1998–2008).
- Brian Dunning, 70, Irish flautist and composer.
- Sir Manuel Esquivel, 81, Belizean politician, prime minister (1984–1989, 1993–1998) and MP (1984–1998).
- Olsen Filipaina, 64, New Zealand rugby league player (Balmain, national team), kidney failure.
- Philip Fletcher, 75, British public servant.
- Duvall Hecht, 91, American rower (Olympic champion, 1956), and publisher, founder of Books on Tape.
- Sir Godfrey Kelly, 93, Bahamian Olympic sailor (1960, 1964, 1968, 1972).
- Mongush Kenin-Lopsan, 96, Russian writer, poet, and historian.
- Jörgen Kolni, 75, Swedish Olympic sailor (1968, 1976).
- Roman Kostrzewski, 61, Polish heavy metal musician (Kat).
- Eduard Kukan, 82, Slovak politician, member of the National Council (1994–1998, 2006–2009), minister of foreign affairs (1994, 1998–2006) and MEP (2009–2019), heart attack.
- Jiří Linha, 91, Czech vocalist and chorus master.
- Mwele Ntuli Malecela, 58, Tanzanian civil servant, cancer.
- Nikolai Manoshin, 83, Russian football player (Torpedo Moscow, CSKA Moscow, Soviet Union national team) and manager.
- Tom McCormick, 96, American politician, member of the New Hampshire House of Representatives (2002–2004).
- A. L. Mentxaka, Irish writer and academic.
- Mino Milani, 94, Italian journalist, writer, and cartoonist.
- Mane Nett, 73, Chilean actress.
- Ingvar Oldsberg, 76, Swedish television presenter (På spåret, Bingolotto) and sports journalist, heart attack.
- Maria Antònia Oliver Cabrer, 75, Spanish writer.
- Aleksander Omelyanchuk, 74, Ukrainian physicist.
- Waverly Person, 95, American seismologist.
- Donatella Raffai, 78, Italian radio and television writer and presenter.
- Francesco Samà, 81, Italian politician, deputy (1983–1992).
- R. R. Singh, 86, Indian politician, mayor of Mumbai (1993–1994).
- Anthony Stern, 77, British experimental filmmaker and glass maker.
- Craig Stowers, 67, American jurist, associate justice (2009–2020) and chief justice (2015–2018) of the Alaska Supreme Court.
- Joseph Surasarang, 84, Thai Roman Catholic prelate, bishop of Chiang Mai (1987–2009).
- Givi Toidze, 89, Georgian painter and artist.
- Erwan Vallerie, 77, French cultural activist, fall.
- John Wesley, 93, American painter.
- Stefan Żywotko, 102, Polish football manager (Arkonia Szczecin, Warta Poznań, JS Kabylie).

=== 11 ===
- Jean Bénabou, 89–90, Moroccan-born French mathematician.
- Chen Wen-min, 102, Taiwanese film director, screenwriter, and producer.
- Lorinda Cherry, 77, American computer scientist and programmer.
- Pranab R. Dastidar, 88, Indian nuclear physicist.
- Ilia Datunashvili, 84, Georgian footballer (Kolmeurne Lanchkhuti, Lokomotivi Kutaisi, Dinamo Tbilisi).
- Lucien Degauchy, 84, French politician, deputy (1993–2017).
- Ed DeWitt, 87, American Olympic wrestler.
- Dawn Gibbins, 60–61, British philanthropist and entrepreneur.
- Addai II Giwargis, 74, Iraqi Orthodox prelate, catholicos-patriarch of the Ancient Church of the East (since 1972).
- John Hlay, 91, American football player (Ohio State Buckeyes).
- Kevin Hogarth, 88, Australian Olympic boxer.
- Mel Keefer, 95, American cartoonist (Mac Divot), Inkpot Award inductee (2007).
- Philippe van Kessel, 76, Belgian actor (Largo Winch II, Eternity, Working Girls) and stage director.
- Knightowl, 55, Mexican-born American Chicano rapper, complications from COVID-19.
- Lula, 75, Brazilian football player (Internacional, national team) and manager (Itaperuna).
- Ted Mappus, 95, American politician, member of the South Carolina House of Representatives (1987–1991).
- Chet McCracken, 75, American drummer (The Doobie Brothers).
- Ally Mtoni, 28, Tanzanian footballer (Young Africans, Ruvu Shooting, national team).
- Caroline Balderston Parry, 76-77, Canadian writer and musician, pancreatic cancer.
- Jean-Marc Piotte, 81, Canadian philosopher and academic, heart attack.
- Syed Mohammad Qaisar, 81, Bangladeshi politician and convicted war criminal, minister of agriculture (1988–1991) and MP (1979–1988).
- Mike Rabon, 78, American musician (The Five Americans) and songwriter ("Western Union").
- Mārtiņš Rītiņš, 72, British-born Latvian chef, businessman, and television presenter, COVID-19.
- Dan Robinson, 95, American football coach (Western Carolina Catamounts).
- George Rock, 85, Barbadian cricketer (national team).
- Ravi Tandon, 86, Indian film director and producer (Anhonee, Apne Rang Hazaar, Ek Main Aur Ek Tu).
- Isabel Torres, 52, Spanish actress (Veneno) and television presenter, lung cancer.
- Hugo Torres Jiménez, 73, Nicaraguan Sandinista guerrilla and military leader.
- Ken Turner, 86, Australian footballer (Collingwood).
- Pedro Villagrán, 75, Spanish politician, senator (2004–2008).
- Jack C. Watson, 93, American judge, justice of the Louisiana Supreme Court (1979–1996).
- Tall Oak Weeden, 85, American indigenous rights activist.

=== 12 ===
- Rahul Bajaj, 83, Indian automotive executive and politician, chairman of Bajaj Group (1965–2021) and MP (2006–2010), pneumonia.
- William G. Batchelder, 79, American politician, member (1969–1998, 2007–2014) and speaker (2011–2014) of the Ohio House of Representatives.
- Frank Beckmann, 72, German-born American broadcaster (WJR), complications from vascular dementia.
- Valerie Boyd, 58, American writer and biographer.
- Alexander Brody, 89, Hungarian-American businessman, author, and marketing executive.
- Zurab Chumburidze, 95, Georgian linguist.
- Mireille Delmas-Marty, 80, French jurist.
- Bob DeMeo, 66, American jazz drummer.
- João Carlos Di Genio, 82, Brazilian businessman.
- Pierre Girard, 95, Swiss Olympic sailor.
- Javier Gómara, 95, Spanish politician, deputy (1982–1986) and president of the Navarrese parliament (1987–1991).
- Tomás Osvaldo González Morales, 86, Chilean Roman Catholic prelate, bishop of Punta Arenas (1974–2006), COVID-19.
- Howard Grimes, 80, American drummer (Hi Rhythm Section), kidney failure.
- Gladys Guarisma, 83, Venezuelan linguist.
- Francis Xavier Sudartanta Hadisumarta, 89, Indonesian Roman Catholic prelate, bishop of Malang (1973–1988) and Manokwari–Sorong (1988–2003).
- Makoto Hasebe, 70, Japanese politician, mayor of Yurihonjō (2009–2021).
- Robert M. Hayes, 95, American information scientist.
- Carmen Herrera, 106, Cuban-born American artist.
- Tatsu Ishimoda, 97, Japanese politician, member of the House of Representatives (1972–1976).
- Calvin Jones, 58, American baseball player (Seattle Mariners), cancer.
- Brian Kan, 84, Hong Kong racehorse trainer and politician.
- Marguerite Kerrigan, 90, American baseball player (Rockford Peaches).
- Zinaida Kiriyenko, 88, Russian actress (And Quiet Flows the Don, Fate of a Man, Chronicle of Flaming Years) and singer.
- Moldomusa Kongantiyev, 63, Kyrgyz politician, minister of the interior (2008–2010).
- William Kraft, 98, American composer and conductor.
- Pete Liske, 79, American football player (Calgary Stampeders, Denver Broncos, Philadelphia Eagles).
- Walter López Reyes, 81, Honduran politician, vice president (1994–1998).
- Edmur Mesquita, 67, Brazilian politician, São Paulo MLA (1999–2003), COVID-19.
- Jit Murad, 62, Malaysian actor (Beyond Rangoon, Waris Jari Hantu, 1957: Hati Malaya) and playwright.
- Szabolcs Pásztor, 62, Hungarian Olympic fencer (1988).
- Bhanumati Rao, 98, Indian classical dancer and stage actress.
- Ivan Reitman, 75, Czechoslovak-born Canadian film director (Ghostbusters, Meatballs, Kindergarten Cop) and producer, founder of The Montecito Picture Company.
- Robert Ruwe, 80, American tax judge.
- James Seawright, 85-86, American sculptor.
- Mark Shulman, 70, Australian rugby league player (St. George).
- Stevan Tontić, 75, Bosnian writer and translator.
- Antoni Vadell Ferrer, 49, Spanish Roman Catholic prelate, auxiliary bishop of Barcelona (since 2017), pancreatic cancer.
- Karl Vaino, 98, Estonian politician, secretary of the Communist Party (1978–1988).
- Aurelio de la Vega, 96, Cuban-American composer and educator.
- Beryl Vertue, 90, English television producer (Men Behaving Badly, Sherlock, Jekyll), founder of Hartswood Films.
- Nolan Williams, 80, American politician, member of the Alabama House of Representatives (1975–1995).
- Sharon Wohlmuth, 75, American photographer and author.
- Sue Yenger, 83, American politician, member of the Iowa Senate (1979–1983).
- Charles Yohane, 48, Zimbabwean footballer (AmaZulu, Bidvest Wits, national team), shot.
- Zakaria Damane, Central African warlord, shot.

=== 13 ===
- King Louie Bankston, 49, American rock musician (The Exploding Hearts).
- Berit Berthelsen, 77, Norwegian Olympic athlete (1964, 1968).
- Shagdaryn Bira, 94, Mongolian historian.
- Ann Buchanan, 80, British academic.
- Hilda Margery Clarke, 95, English painter.
- Dasril Panin Datuk Labuan, 74, Indonesian politician, member of the People's Representative Council (1982–1987, 1993–2003).
- Peter Earnest, 88, American intelligence officer and museum director (International Spy Museum), heart failure.
- Peter Gray, 86, Irish Olympic sailor.
- Kajazun Gyurjyan, 99, Armenian stage actor.
- Enrique Hernández-Luike, 93, Spanish magazine publisher and poet.
- Ferdinand Hueter, 62, Austrian politician.
- John Keston, 97, British-born American stage actor and runner, complications from COVID-19.
- M. C. Leist, 79, American politician, member of the Oklahoma House of Representatives (1987–2007).
- Emanuel Marx, 94, German-born Israeli social anthropologist.
- Mikhail Naidov, 89, Russian miner and politician.
- Eduardo Pardo, 68, Bolivian economist and diplomat, ambassador to Cuba (since 2021).
- Aron Pinczuk, 82, Argentine-American physicist.
- Bob Pritikin, 92, American advertising executive, creative director and author.
- Fabio Restrepo, 62, Colombian actor (Sumas y restas, Rosario Tijeras), COVID-19.
- Aled Roberts, 59, Welsh politician, AM (2011–2016).
- Val Robinson, 80, English field hockey player (national team), cancer.
- Enzo Robutti, 88, Italian actor (Mr. Kinky, Tell Me You Do Everything for Me, Dog's Heart).
- Eduardo Romero, 67, Argentine golfer (PGA Tour, European Tour) and politician, mayor of Villa Allende (since 2015).
- Francisco Sánchez Martínez, 54, Colombian long-distance runner.
- Burghart Schmidt, 79, German philosopher.
- Halyna Sevruk, 92, Ukrainian artist.
- Johnny Whiteley, 91, English rugby league player (Hull F.C., Great Britain) and coach.
- Sandra Worthen, 84, American politician, member of the Delaware House of Representatives (1973–1978).
- Thomas Yuen, 70, Chinese-born American technology executive, co-founder of AST Research.
- Anatoly Zaytsev, 82, Russian politician, minister of railways (1996–1997).

=== 14 ===
- Geoff Barker, 73, English footballer (Darlington, Grimsby Town).
- Ralf Bursy, 66, German singer and music producer.
- Herbert V. Camp, 86, American politician, member of the Connecticut House of Representatives (1969–1975).
- Bob Conley, 88, American baseball player (Philadelphia Phillies).
- David Cory, 93, Australian politician.
- Joan Croll, 93, Australian radiologist.
- Kenny Ejim, 27, Canadian basketball player (Zornotza, Saskatchewan Rattlers, Hamilton Honey Badgers).
- Tony Fuochi, 66, Italian voice actor, complications from COVID-19.
- Francine-Charlotte Gehri, 98, Swiss writer.
- Alan J. Greiman, 90, American politician and jurist, member of the Illinois House of Representatives (1972–1987), heart failure.
- Mickie Henson, 59, American professional wrestling referee (WCW, WWE), complications from COVID-19.
- Ingeborg Heuser, 94, German dancer, choreographer and teacher.
- Graham Houghton, 84, New Zealand historian, co-founder of the South Asia Institute of Advanced Christian Studies.
- Borislav Ivkov, 88, Serbian chess grandmaster.
- Driss El Khouri, 83, Moroccan writer.
- Larisa Kislinskaya, 63, Russian journalist. (death announced on this date)
- Elliott Leyton, 82, Canadian social anthropologist, educator and author.
- Lin Kun-hai, 68, Taiwanese television producer and entrepreneur, co-founder and chairman of Sanlih E-Television.
- Nancy Lord, 70, American politician, medical researcher and attorney, COVID-19.
- Željko Mijač, 68, Croatian football player (Hajduk Split, Rijeka) and manager (Standard Liège).
- Raees Mohammad, 89, Pakistani cricketer (Karachi, Peshawar).
- Jean-Jacques Moine, 67, French Olympic swimmer (1972).
- Julio Morales, 76, Uruguayan footballer (Racing Club de Montevideo, Austria Wien, national team).
- Richard Mulder, 83, American politician, member of the Minnesota House of Representatives (1995–2002).
- Bhargavi Narayan, 84, Indian actress (Eradu Kanasu, Hanthakana Sanchu, Pallavi Anu Pallavi) and writer.
- Sandy Nelson, 83, American drummer ("Teen Beat", "Let There Be Drums"), complications from a stroke.
- Khayal Zaman Orakzai, Pakistani politician, MNA (since 2013), cancer.
- Daniel Passent, 83, Polish journalist (Polityka) and writer, ambassador to Chile (1997–2002).
- Hubert de Ravinel, 87, French-born Canadian television producer and writer.
- Robert E. Rose, 82, American justice and politician, lieutenant governor of Nevada (1975–1979).
- Uli Sckerl, 70, German politician, member of the Landtag of Baden-Württemberg (since 2006).
- Alfred Sole, 78, American film director (Alice, Sweet Alice, Pandemonium) and production designer (Veronica Mars), suicide.
- Tom Veitch, 80, American comic book writer (The Light and Darkness War, Animal Man, Star Wars) and novelist, COVID-19.
- Mary Willey, 80, Australian politician and journalist.
- Yoo Sang-yeol, 81, South Korean administrator and entrepreneur.

=== 15 ===
- Rustam Akramov, 73, Uzbek football manager (national team, India national team).
- Artur Albarran, 69, Portuguese journalist, leukaemia.
- Lidiya Belozyorova, 76, Ukrainian actress.
- Marie Chamming's, 98, French Resistance member and writer.
- David Chidgey, Baron Chidgey, 79, British politician, MP (1994–2005) and member of the House of Lords (since 2005).
- Mohamed Haddou Chiguer, 90, Moroccan politician.
- Bill Dando, 89, American college football player (San Francisco, Detroit) and coach (Buffalo).
- Richard Estell, 58, American football player (Kansas City Chiefs, Hamilton Tiger-Cats).
- Youhanna Golta, 85, Egyptian Coptic Catholic hierarch, auxiliary and curial bishop of Alexandria (1986–2020).
- Arnaldo Jabor, 81, Brazilian film director (Pindorama, All Nudity Shall Be Punished, Tudo Bem), screenwriter and producer.
- Michael Janus, 55, American politician, member of the Mississippi House of Representatives (1996–2009).
- Jeong Changhwa, 81, South Korean politician.
- Charles Juravinski, 92, Canadian businessman and philanthropist, founder of Flamboro Downs.
- Onur Kumbaracıbaşı, 83, Turkish civil servant, minister of public works (1991–1994), COVID-19.
- Bappi Lahiri, 69, Indian singer, composer (Asha O Bhalobasha, Disco Dancer, Namak Halaal) and record producer, complications from obstructive sleep apnea.
- Juan Carlos Lallana, 83, Argentine footballer (national team).
- Roger Lambrecht, 90, Belgian businessman and footballer, president of K.S.C. Lokeren Oost-Vlaanderen (1994–2019).
- Dominique Marcas, 101, French actress (Where Is Madame Catherine?, Liza, Mozart's Sister).
- Siegfried Martsch, 68, German politician, member of the Landtag of North Rhine-Westphalia (1990–2000).
- Tamaz Mechiauri, 67, Georgian politician, COVID-19.
- David Melnick, 83, American poet.
- Peter Merseburger, 93, German journalist and author.
- Sandhya Mukherjee, 90, Indian playback singer (Nishi Padma, Jaagte Rahoo, Mamta), cardiac arrest.
- Bobby Neill, 88, Scottish boxer, complications from COVID-19.
- Corneliu Olar, 62, Romanian politician
- P. J. O'Rourke, 74, American humorist (National Lampoon), journalist, and author (Parliament of Whores, Give War a Chance), lung cancer.
- Dong Puno, 76, Filipino journalist and television host (Viewpoint, Business Today, Dong Puno Live).
- Juan Antonio Quintana, 83, Spanish actor (Amar en tiempos revueltos).
- Edgars Račevskis, 85, Latvian conductor.
- Duane Raver, 94, American illustrator.
- Bill Robinson, 96, American automobile designer (Chrysler).
- Arif Şentürk, 81, Yugoslav-born Turkish folk singer.
- Taranath Sharma, 87, Nepalese writer and literary critic.
- Deep Sidhu, 37, Indian barrister, actor (Ramta Jogi, Jora 10 Numbaria) and activist, traffic collision.
- Woodrow Stanley, 71, American politician, mayor of Flint (1991–2002) and member of the Michigan House of Representatives (2009–2014).
- LeRoy W. Svendsen Jr., 93, American major general.
- Taina Tudegesheva, 64, Russian poet.
- Vivi l'internationale, 75, Beninese singer.
- Nachman Wolf, 70, Israeli athlete, Paralympic champion (1984, 1988).
- Józef Zapędzki, 92, Polish sport shooter, Olympic champion (1968, 1972).

=== 16 ===
- Ba Ge, 67, Taiwanese actor (Orchids and My Love) and television presenter, pancreatic cancer.
- Boris Balmont, 94, Russian politician.
- R. Wayne Baughman, 81, American Olympic wrestler (1964, 1968, 1972).
- Roger Blades, 58, Barbadian cricketer (Bermuda national team) and police officer.
- Vasilios Botinos, 77, Greek footballer (Olympiacos Volos, Olympiacos, national team), COVID-19.
- John Bowler, 85, English football executive, chairman of Crewe Alexandra (1987–2021).
- Erling Brandsnes, 76, Norwegian politician.
- Cristina Calderón, 93, Chilean Yaghan singer, ethnographer, and writer, COVID-19.
- Minita Chico-Nazario, 82, Filipino jurist, associate justice of the supreme court (2004–2009).
- Michel Deguy, 91, French poet and translator.
- Walter Dellinger, 80, American lawyer and academic, acting solicitor general (1996–1997).
- Luigi De Magistris, 95, Italian Roman Catholic cardinal, regent (1979–2001) and pro-major penitentiary (2001–2003) of the Apostolic Penitentiary.
- Hans-Georg Dulz, 85, German footballer (Borussia Dortmund, SSV Reutlingen 05, Eintracht Braunschweig).
- Dorce Gamalama, 58, Indonesian television presenter, COVID-19.
- Harry E. Goldsworthy, 107, American Air Force officer.
- Dražen Gović, 40, Croatian footballer (Zadar, Šibenik, DPMM), traffic collision.
- Gail Halvorsen, 101, American pilot ("Operation Little Vittles"), respiratory failure.
- Jeffrey Hyland, 75, American real estate businessman.
- Esmaeil Jabbarzadeh, 61–62, Iranian politician, MP (1992–2008) and governor of East Azerbaijan (2013–2017), cardiac arrest.
- Stuart Jack, 72, British diplomat, governor of the Cayman Islands (2005–2009).
- Chennaveera Kanavi, 93, Indian poet and writer, complications from COVID-19.
- Leonard Kessler, 101, American children's book author.
- Andrey Lopatov, 64, Russian basketball player, Olympic bronze medalist (1980).
- Didier-Léon Marchand, 96, French Roman Catholic prelate, bishop of Valence (1978–2001).
- Saeed Marie, 67, Egyptian judge, president of the Supreme Constitutional Court (since 2019).
- Américo Martín, 84, Venezuelan politician, deputy (1979–1984).
- Alpheus Muheua, 65, Namibian politician.
- Declan O'Brien, 56, American film director and screenwriter (Wrong Turn, The Marine 3: Homefront, Joy Ride 3: Roadkill).
- John Aloysius O'Mara, 97, American-born Canadian Roman Catholic prelate, bishop of Thunder Bay (1976–1991) and Saint Catharines (1991–2002).
- Pheung Kya-shin, 91, Burmese guerrilla leader and drug smuggler, chairman of Kokang Special Region (1989–1993, 1995–2009).
- Jean-Marie Queneau, 87, French artist.
- Roger Rager, 73, American Hall of Fame racing driver (USAC, CART).
- Marco Salvador, 73, Italian writer and historian.
- Chelique Sarabia, 81, Venezuelan musician and songwriter.
- Mona Saudi, 76, Jordanian sculptor and publisher.
- Amos Sawyer, 76, Liberian politician, interim president (1990–1994), cardiac arrest.
- Jack Smethurst, 89, English actor (Love Thy Neighbour, Man About the House, King Ralph) and comedian.
- Ramón Stagnaro, 67, Peruvian guitarist.
- Toni Stricker, 91, Austrian composer and violinist.
- William Underhill, 88, American sculptor and metalworker.
- Valentino Valli, 92, Italian footballer (Milan, Atalanta).
- Anthony Wood, 96, British heraldic artist.

=== 17 ===
- Romāns Apsītis, 83, Latvian jurist and politician, deputy (1993–1998) and minister of justice (1994–1995).
- Bernard Ballet, 81, French actor (Uranus, The Birth of Love).
- Jack Bendat, 96, American-born Australian businessman.
- Nigel Berlyn, 87, English-born Australian rear admiral.
- David Brenner, 59, American film editor (Born on the Fourth of July, Man of Steel, Independence Day), Oscar winner (1990).
- Vincent Burke, 70, New Zealand film and television producer.
- Steve Burtenshaw, 86, English football player (Brighton & Hove Albion) and manager (Sheffield Wednesday, Queens Park Rangers).
- Gary Chaison, 78, American industrial relations scholar and labor historian.
- Levon Chaushian, 75, Armenian composer.
- Fausto Cigliano, 85, Italian singer, guitarist and actor (Maid, Thief and Guard, Cerasella, Passione).
- Pasquale DeBaise, 95, American politician, member of the Connecticut House of Representatives (1967–1973).
- Hermann Erlhoff, 77, German football player and manager (Schalke 04, Rot-Weiss Essen).
- James Felt, 96, American philosopher.
- Máté Fenyvesi, 88, Hungarian footballer (Ferencváros, national team) and politician, MP (1998–2006).
- Gerardo Humberto Flores Reyes, 96, Guatemalan Roman Catholic prelate, bishop of Verapaz (1971–2001).
- Lee Gentil, 87, Puerto Rican Olympic sailor.
- Dallas Good, 48, Canadian musician (The Sadies).
- Sharon Green, 79, American author (The Blending).
- Jim Hagedorn, 59, American politician, member of the U.S. House of Representatives (since 2019), kidney cancer.
- Roddie Haley, 57, American sprinter.
- Marc Hamilton, 78, Canadian singer ("Comme j'ai toujours envie d'aimer"), COVID-19.
- Sudhir Joshi, 81, Indian politician, mayor of Mumbai (1973–1974).
- Chris King, 72, British geologist.
- Pradeep Kottayam, 61, Indian actor (Vinnaithaandi Varuvaayaa, Raja Rani, Ithihasa), heart attack.
- František Václav Lobkowicz, 74, Czech Roman Catholic prelate, bishop of Ostrava-Opava (since 1996).
- Geoff Malone, 79, Australian architect and actor (Homesdale), founder of the Singapore International Film Festival.
- Billy McEwan, 70, Scottish football player (Rotherham United, Chesterfield) and manager (Sheffield United).
- André Messelis, 91, Belgian road racing cyclist.
- Charlie Milstead, 84, American football player (Houston Oilers).
- Ahmed Mostafa, 81, Egyptian footballer (1964 Olympic team, Zamalek, national team).
- Askia Muhammad, 76, American photojournalist and writer.
- Gilbert Postelle, 35, American convicted murderer, execution by lethal injection.
- Asavadi Prakasarao, 77, Indian writer and poet, cardiac arrest.
- Martín Quirós, 92, Spanish politician, member of the Valencian Courts (1991–2002).
- Ginette Ravel, 81, Canadian singer and lyricist.
- François Ricard, 74, Canadian writer and academic.
- Giuseppe Ros, 79, Italian boxer, Olympic bronze medallist (1964), COVID-19.
- Sol Sanders, 96, American journalist.
- Roger Savory, 97, Canadian Iranologist.
- John Scott, 71, Canadian artist.
- Surajit Sengupta, 70, Indian footballer (East Bengal, national team), complications from COVID-19.
- George Silides, 99, American politician, member of the Alaska Senate (1973–1974).
- Martin Tolchin, 93, American journalist (The New York Times) and author, co-founder of The Hill and Politico, cancer.
- Henny Trayles, 84, German-born Uruguayan actress (Verano del '98, Floricienta, Graduados).
- Clarence "Pooh Bear" Williams, 47, American football player (Florida State Seminoles, Buffalo Bills), traffic collision.
- Ahmad Zulkifli Lubis, 50, Indonesian voice actor.

=== 18 ===
- Terry Arthur, 81, English rugby union player.
- Ambalang Ausalin, 78, Filipino weaver.
- Gabriel Bach, 94, German-born Israeli jurist, judge of the Supreme Court (1982–1997).
- Luigi Di Bartolomeo, 79, Italian politician, president of Molise (1992–1993), mayor of Campobasso (2009–2014) and senator (2006–2008).
- John Brewer, 71, American sprinter, paralympic champion (1988).
- Danic Champoux, 46, Canadian documentary filmmaker (Self(less) Portrait).
- Leo Fong, 93, Chinese-American actor (Enforcer from Death Row, The Last Reunion), film director (Fight to Win), and martial artist.
- Steve Fonyo, 56, Canadian runner, seizure.
- Sir Christopher Foster, 91, British economist.
- Dorothée Gizenga, 60, Congolese political activist.
- François Gros, 96, French biologist.
- Hans-Olof Johansson, 85, Swedish Olympic sprinter (1960).
- Brad Johnson, 62, American actor (Always, Soldier of Fortune, Inc.) and model (Marlboro Man), complications from COVID-19.
- Anish Khan, 28, Indian student activist, fall from building.
- Daniel LeMahieu, 75, American politician, member of the Wisconsin State Assembly (2003–2015).
- Bardhyl Londo, 74, Albanian writer and poet.
- Mauri, 87, Spanish footballer (Athletic Bilbao, national team).
- Michele McNally, 66, American photojournalism editor (The New York Times).
- R. G. E. Murray, 102, English-Canadian bacteriologist.
- Boris Nevzorov, 72, Russian actor (Find and Neutralize, Stalingrad, The Fool) and film director, COVID-19.
- Hugh Niblock, 72, Irish Gaelic footballer (Magherafelt, St Gall's).
- Witold Paszt, 68, Polish singer, complications from COVID-19.
- Lindsey Pearlman, 43, American actress (Chicago Justice).
- Hans-Erik Pedersen, 78, Danish Olympic boxer.
- Zdzisław Podkański, 72, Polish politician, minister of culture and art (1996–1997), MP (1993–2004) and MEP (2004–2009).
- Héctor Pulido, 79, Mexican football player (1968 Olympic team, Cruz Azul, national team) and manager.
- David Rabeeya, 83, Israeli-American author and poet.
- Alexander Savchenko, 70, Kazakh politician, senator (2008–2014).
- Deborah Senn, 72, American politician.
- Chris Scicluna, 62, Maltese singer-songwriter (Chris and Moira).
- George Shirkey, 85, American football player (Houston Oilers, Oakland Raiders).
- Shamil Sultanov, 69, Russian politician, deputy (2003–2007).
- Trevor Swift, 73, English footballer (Rotherham United).
- Harold Titter, 91, New Zealand businessman.
- Gennadi Yukhtin, 89, Russian actor (The Rumyantsev Case, Spring on Zarechnaya Street, Ballad of a Soldier), COVID-19.

=== 19 ===
- Doug Baillie, 85, Scottish footballer (Falkirk, Airdrieonians, Rangers).
- Joey Beauchamp, 50, English footballer (Oxford United, Swindon Town, West Ham United), suicide by hanging.
- Sergei Beletzkiy, 68, Russian archaeologist and historian, COVID-19.
- David Boggs, 71, American electrical and radio engineer, co-inventor of Ethernet, heart failure.
- David Bradley, 69, American politician, member of the Arizona Senate (2013–2021) and House of Representatives (2003–2011), cancer.
- Gary Brooker, 76, English musician (Procol Harum), cancer.
- Jean-Luc Brunel, 75, French model scout, suicide by hanging.
- Nigel Butterley, 86, Australian composer.
- Bert Coan, 81, American football player (Kansas City Chiefs, San Diego Chargers).
- Chuck Dunaway, 87, American radio personality.
- Emile Francis, 95, Canadian Hall of Fame ice hockey player, coach (New York Rangers), and executive (Hartford Whalers, St. Louis Blues).
- Marino Golinelli, 101, Italian businessman and art collector.
- Roy W. Gould, 94, American electrical engineer and physicist.
- Dan Graham, 79, American visual artist.
- Franz Grave, 89, German Roman Catholic prelate, auxiliary bishop of Essen (1988–2008).
- Peter Grayburn, 96, New Zealand businessman.
- Monique Hanotte, 101, Belgian Resistance member.
- Adlene Harrison, 98, American politician, mayor of Dallas (1976).
- Patrick Hughes, 78, Irish cricketer (national team).
- Maggy Hurchalla, 81, American environmental activist, cardiac arrest.
- Walid Ikhlasi, 86, Syrian writer.
- Franz Krug, 86, German politician, member of the Landtag of Bavaria (1970–1978).
- Kyi Hla Han, 61, Burmese golfer, executive chairman of the Asian Tour.
- Enid Luff, 86, Welsh musician and composer.
- Wilfred Machage, 65, Kenyan politician, deputy (2003–2013) and senator (2013–2017).
- Álvaro Manzano, 66, Ecuadorian conductor.
- Xavier Marc, 74, Mexican actor (Two Mules for Sister Sara, The Bridge in the Jungle, The Legend of Zorro).
- Kakuichi Mimura, 90, Japanese football player (Toho Titanium, national team) and manager.
- Nightbirde, 31, American singer-songwriter, cancer.
- Jan Pieńkowski, 85, Polish-born British author and illustrator (Meg and Mog), complications of dementia.
- Jacques Poos, 86, Luxembourgish politician, minister of finances (1976–1979) and foreign affairs (1984–1999), deputy prime minister (1984–1999).
- Rajesh, 89, Indian actor (Boregowda Bangalorige Banda, Devara Duddu, Thavarumane Udugore).
- Irma Rosnell, 94, Finnish politician, MP (1954–1987).
- Richard Shannon, 90, British historian.
- Sir Richard Shepherd, 79, British politician, MP (1979–2015).
- Norman Shutt, 92, British Olympic biathlete.
- Malcolm Snider, 74, American football player (Atlanta Falcons, Green Bay Packers) and orthopedic surgeon.
- Christopher Stalford, 39, Northern Irish politician, MLA (since 2016).
- Charley Taylor, 80, American Hall of Fame football player (Washington Redskins) and coach.
- Ravish Tiwari, 40, Indian journalist.
- Raymond Uytterhaeghe, 74, French Olympic wrestler.
- Gábor Vida, 92, Hungarian Olympic figure skater (1952).
- Gerhard Wächter, 75, German politician, MP (2002–2009).

=== 20 ===
- Vasiliy Bebko, 89, Ukrainian-born Russian diplomat.
- Bob Beckel, 73, American political commentator (The Five, USA Today), campaign manager, and civil servant.
- Abderrahim Berrada, 83–84, Moroccan lawyer and human rights activist.
- Leo Bersani, 90, American literary theorist.
- Stewart Bevan, 73, British actor (Doctor Who, Emmerdale, The Ghoul).
- John Bonney, 75, Australian footballer (St Kilda).
- Eduardo Bonomi, 73, Uruguayan guerrilla member and politician, minister of the interior (2010–2020) and labour (2005–2009), senator (since 2020), cardiac arrest.
- Jose Fabian Cadiz, 61, Filipino physician and politician.
- Shakuntala Choudhary, 101, Indian social worker.
- Sami Clark, 73, Lebanese singer.
- HO de Villiers, 76, South African rugby union player (national team).
- Jamal Edwards, 31, British entrepreneur, author, and DJ, founder of SB.TV, cardiac arrest.
- Ken Epp, 82, Canadian politician, MP (1993–2008).
- Dawda Fadera, Gambian diplomat, ambassador to the United States (since 2018).
- Pierluigi Frosio, 73, Italian football player (Cesena, Perugia) and manager.
- Thomas K. Gaisser, 81, American particle physicist.
- Daniel Gómez, 73, Mexican Olympic water polo player (1968, 1972, 1976).
- Sam Henry, 65, American drummer (Wipers), complications from stomach cancer.
- Christian Herwartz, 78, German Roman Catholic priest.
- Joni James, 91, American singer ("Why Don't You Believe Me?").
- Merle Kodo Boyd, 77, American Zen master.
- Yevgeny Kozlovsky, 92, Russian geologist and politician, minister of geology (1975–1989).
- Marcel LaFrance, 81, Canadian racing driver.
- Nils Lindberg, 88, Swedish composer and jazz musician.
- Fedor Madurov, 79, Russian sculptor and graphic artist.
- Ivan Matušík, 91, Slovak architect.
- Diane McNaron, 74–75, American singer.
- Krystyna Meissner, 88, Polish theatre director.
- Babatunde Ogunnaike, 65, Nigerian-born American chemical engineer.
- Réal Ouellet, 86, Canadian writer and academic.
- Sadhan Pande, 71, Indian politician, West Bengal MLA (since 1985).
- Jack Parker, 94, British Olympic hurdler (1952, 1956).
- Margaret Richards, 93, Scottish architect.
- Quazi Rosy, 73, Bangladeshi poet and politician, MP (2014–2018), COVID-19.
- Teruhiko Saigō, 75, Japanese singer and actor (The Fall of Ako Castle), prostate cancer.
- Liz Shore, 94, British general practitioner and civil servant.
- Robert Silverman, 88, Canadian cycling activist.
- Felix Strok, 90, Russian diplomat.
- Oleksandr Sydorenko, 61, Ukrainian swimmer, Olympic champion (1980), COVID-19.
- Francesca Tardioli, 56, Italian diplomat, ambassador to Australia (since 2018), fall.
- Henry Tippie, 95, American businessman.
- Maurice Tremblay, 77, Canadian politician, MP (1984–1993).
- DeWain Valentine, 86, American minimalist sculptor.
- Martin Yeritsyan, 90, Armenian violinist.

=== 21 ===
- Julio Abreu, 67, Paraguayan Olympic swimmer (1976).
- Ernie Andrews, 94, American jazz singer.
- Nava Arad, 83, Israeli politician, MK (1981–1992, 1995–1996).
- Neil Balnaves, 77, Australian media executive and arts philanthropist, boating accident.
- Joaquín Bernadó, 86, Spanish bullfighter.
- Sir Robert Burgess, 74, British sociologist and academic.
- Roger Carter, 87, British mathematician.
- Chor Yuen, 88, Hong Kong film director (Emperor and His Brother, The Duel of the Century, Perils of the Sentimental Swordsman), screenwriter and actor.
- John Emery, 90, Canadian bobsledder, Olympic champion (1964), melanoma.
- Paul Farmer, 62, American medical anthropologist.
- Miguel Gallardo, 66, Spanish comic book author (El Víbora).
- Eduardo González Pálmer, 87, Mexican footballer (Club América, national team).
- John Healey, 94, British Olympic rower.
- Nikolai Litus, 97, Ukrainian film director (Queen of the Gas Station, Flying Days).
- Mekapati Goutham Reddy, 50, Indian politician, Andhra Pradesh MLA (since 2014), heart attack.
- Celeste Sánchez Romero, 32, Mexican politician, deputy (since 2021), suicide by drug overdose.
- Rosemarie Sansone, 77, American politician.
- Jürgen Schreiber, 75, German journalist and author.
- Robert Sward, 88, American-Canadian author and poet.
- Merlin Swartz, 88, American religion scholar.
- Shad Thyrion, 24, American murder victim.
- Anatoliy Turusin, 82, Russian politician, deputy (1990–1993), MP (1994–1999).
- Bernardas Vasiliauskas, 83, Lithuanian pianist and organist.
- Abdul Waheed, 85, Pakistani field hockey player, Olympic champion (1960).

=== 22 ===
- Robert Ackerman, 84, American politician and lawyer, Parkinson's disease.
- Abdinasir Haji Ahmed, 67, Somali cleric and Islamic preacher for Dawah, Assassinated by Al-Shabaab.
- The Amazing Johnathan, 63, American magician and stand-up comedian.
- Christos Angourakis, 69, Greek athlete, Paralympic silver medallist (1992).
- David Banks, 74, British newspaper editor and broadcaster, editor of the Daily Mirror (1992–1994), pneumonia.
- Árpád Bánkuti, 80, Hungarian Olympic ice hockey player.
- Jesús Tirso Blanco, 64, Argentine Roman Catholic prelate, bishop of Lwena (since 2008).
- Louis Bourgeois, 84, French footballer (Lille OSC, Stade de Reims).
- Kausar Ahmed Chaudhury, 77, Bangladeshi astrologer and lyricist.
- Julio Cruz, 67, American baseball player (Seattle Mariners, Chicago White Sox).
- Thomas Demakos, 98, American judge.
- Charles Dempsey, 84, American art historian, heart attack.
- Ivan Dziuba, 90, Ukrainian literary critic and activist, minister of culture (1992–1994).
- Muvaffak "Maffy" Falay, 91, Turkish trumpeter.
- Giancarlo Gallesi, 90, Italian football player (Milan, Genoa) and coach (Vigevano).
- José Isidro Guerrero Macías, 70, Mexican Roman Catholic prelate, bishop of Mexicali (since 1997), COVID-19.
- Kamil Jalilov, 84, Azerbaijani musician.
- Anna Karen, 85, South African-born English actress (EastEnders, On the Buses, Carry On), injuries sustained in a house fire.
- Eberhard Kube, 85, German mime artist.
- K. P. A. C. Lalitha, 73, Indian actress (Amaram, Shantham, Kadinjool Kalyanam).
- Mark Lanegan, 57, American musician (Screaming Trees, The Gutter Twins) and singer-songwriter ("Nearly Lost You").
- Alberto Lembo, 77, Italian politician, deputy (1994–2001).
- F. Donald Logan, 91, American historian.
- Peggy Luhrs, 76, American women's rights activist, pancreatic cancer.
- Duane Marble, 90, American geographer.
- Germain Marc'hadour, 100, French priest and writer, founder of Moreana.
- Bob Marrs, 94, American saddle maker.
- José Martí Gómez, 84, Spanish journalist (Diario de Barcelona, El País, La Vanguardia).
- Georges Montillier, 82–83, French actor (CIA contro KGB, My New Partner).
- Talal Najjar, 69, Syrian Olympic weightlifter.
- Lasse Näsi, 91, Finnish politician, MP (1991–1995).
- Judith Pipher, 81, Canadian-born American astrophysicist, director of the Mees Observatory (1979–1994).
- Kumar Rupesinghe, 79, Sri Lankan human rights activist.
- Geraldo Sarno, 83, Brazilian film director (Colonel Delmiro Gouveia).
- Alex Siebenhaar, 94, Swiss Olympic rower (1952).
- Magnus Thue, 42, Norwegian politician.
- Josephine Veasey, 91, British mezzo-soprano.
- Michael Woodroofe, 81, American mathematician and statistician.

=== 23 ===
- Carlos Barbosa-Lima, 77, Brazilian classical and jazz guitarist.
- Sheila Benson, 91, American journalist and film critic (Los Angeles Times, Pacific Sun).
- Tatiana Birshtein, 93, Russian molecular scientist.
- Juan Pablo Colmenarejo, 54, Spanish journalist (Cadena COPE), stroke.
- Karl Paul Donfried, 81, American theologian and New Testament scholar.
- Margaret Baker Genovesi, 89, Australian opera singer.
- Arnoldo Granella, 82, Italian-French footballer (Le Havre AC, OGC Nice).
- Don Grist, 83, American politician and jurist, member of the Mississippi House of Representatives (1976–1990).
- Mehdi Hasan, 85, Pakistani journalist, media historian, and academic.
- Edmund Keeley, 94, Syrian-born American novelist and poet.
- George Kinley, 84, American politician, member of the Iowa House of Representatives (1971–1973) and Senate (1973–1992).
- Mike Kmech, 87, Canadian football player (Edmonton Eskimos).
- Jaakko Kuusisto, 48, Finnish composer, conductor, and violinist, brain cancer.
- Jayananda Lama, 65, Nepali folk singer and actor (Chhakka Panja 2, Nai Nabhannu La 5).
- Bernard Langer, 89, Canadian surgeon.
- Rehman Malik, 70, Pakistani politician, minister of the interior (2008–2013) and senator (2009–2012, 2015–2021), complications from COVID-19.
- Yoel Marcus, 90, Israeli journalist and political commentator.
- Colin Masica, 90, American linguist.
- Rusty Mae Moore, 80, American transgender rights activist.
- Kenneth Ozmon, 90, American-born Canadian academic administrator, president of Saint Mary's University (1979–2000).
- Riky Rick, 34, South African rapper, suicide.
- Britta Schall Holberg, 80, Danish politician, MP (1984–1988, 2005–2011), minister of the interior (1982–1986).
- Alberto Sirlin, 91, Argentine theoretical physicist.
- Oleksiy Skrypnyk, 57, Ukrainian politician, deputy (2014–2019), blood clot.
- Antonietta Stella, 92, Italian operatic soprano.
- Andrew Streitwieser, 94, American chemist.
- Joeli Vidiri, 48, Fijian rugby union player (Counties Manukau, New Zealand, national team), complications from COVID-19.
- Ramón José Viloria Pinzón, 62, Venezuelan Roman Catholic prelate, bishop of Puerto Cabello (2004–2010).
- Per Voigt, 91, Norwegian Olympic ice hockey player (1952).
- Jorge Zabalza, 78, Uruguayan guerrilla and politician, oesophageal cancer.
- Ion Adrian Zare, 62, Romanian football player (Bihor Oradea, Siófok, national team) and manager.

=== 24 ===
- Valentin Bakulin, 77, Russian politician, member of the Federation Council (2001–2004).
- Ken Burrough, 73, American football player (Houston Oilers, New Orleans Saints).
- Roberto Carpio, 91, Guatemalan politician, vice president (1986–1991).
- John Chipman, 95, Canadian-born American economist.
- Lillian Chrystall, 95, New Zealand architect.
- John Clubbe, 84, American academic.
- Viktória Cvengrošová, 80, Slovak architect (NTC Arena).
- Dmitry Debelka, 46, Belarusian wrestler, Olympic bronze medalist (2000).
- Francisco Dias Alves, 86, Brazilian politician, deputy (1982–1988).
- Charles E. Entenmann, 92, American businessman, heart complications.
- Lee Everett Alkin, 85, British spiritual healer, psychic and pop singer, cancer.
- Jan Gomola, 80, Polish footballer (Górnik Zabrze, national team).
- Andrii Ivashko, 41–42, Ukrainian soldier, shot.
- Walter Kaegi, 84, American historian.
- Sally Kellerman, 84, American actress (M*A*S*H, Back to School, Brewster McCloud), heart failure.
- Ivanka Khristova, 80, Bulgarian shot putter, Olympic champion (1976).
- Dmytro Kolomiiets, 48, Ukrainian fighter pilot, shot down.
- Tarik Kopty, 77, Israeli actor (The Syrian Bride, Lemon Tree).
- John Landy, 91, Australian middle-distance runner and viceroy, governor of Victoria (2001–2006), Olympic bronze medalist (1956).
- Henry Lincoln, 92, British television writer (Doctor Who), author (The Holy Blood and the Holy Grail) and actor (The Avengers).
- Johnny McGovern, 89, Irish hurler (Bennettsbridge).
- Eduardo Mirás, 92, Argentine Roman Catholic prelate, archbishop of Rosario (1994–2005), complications from COVID-19.
- Paddy Murray, 68, Irish journalist (Evening Herald, Sunday World, Sunday Tribune).
- Kathleen Nord, 56, German swimmer, Olympic champion (1988).
- Gary North, 80, American Christian social theorist and economist.
- Bandula Padmakumara, 71, Sri Lankan journalist and television presenter.
- Deanie Parrish, 99, American WASP pilot during World War II.
- Nida Patcharaveerapong, 37, Thai actress, singer, and racing driver, drowned.
- Morley Sewell, 89, British veterinarian.
- Vitalii Skakun, 25, Ukrainian soldier, explosion.
- Cliff Stanford, 67, British entrepreneur, co-founder of Demon Internet, pancreatic cancer.
- Luan Starova, 80, Albanian writer.
- Va'aiga Tuigamala, 52, Samoan-born New Zealand rugby league (Wigan Warriors) and rugby union (New Zealand, Samoa) player.
- Sir Tony Wrigley, 90, British historian and demographer.
- Catherine Wybourne, 67, British Benedictine nun, commentator, and blogger, cancer.

=== 25 ===
- Al Autry, 69, American baseball player (Atlanta Braves).
- Abdul Hai Baloch, 76, Pakistani politician, MNA (1970–1977), traffic collision.
- Hemananda Biswal, 82, Indian politician, MP (2009–2014) and chief minister of Odisha (1989–1990, 1999–2000).
- Byun Jang-ho, 81, South Korean film director (The Tragedy of Deaf Sam-yong, The Executioner, Potato).
- Paul Cantor, 76, American literary critic.
- Janet Cooling, 70, American painter, breast cancer.
- Estanislao de Grandes, 74, Spanish diplomat, COVID-19.
- Gérard-Joseph Deschamps, 92, Canadian Roman Catholic prelate, bishop of Daru (1966–1999) and Bereina (1999–2002).
- Lorna Fejo, 91, Australian Warumungu woman, member of the stolen generations.
- Farrah Forke, 54, American actress (Wings, Heat, Mr. Rhodes), cancer.
- Oliver Frank, 58, German singer.
- Laurel Goodwin, 79, American actress (Girls! Girls! Girls!, Papa's Delicate Condition, The Glory Guys).
- Robert Hicks, 71, American author.
- Shirley Hughes, 94, English writer (Dogger).
- Lionel James, 59, American football player (San Diego Chargers).
- Klaus Keil, 87, German scientist, cancer.
- Alibaba Mammadov, 93, Azerbaijani singer, composer, and teacher.
- Hennadii Matuliak, 44, Ukrainian military aviator, shot down.
- J. Bradley Morris, 84, American politician, member of the Oregon House of Representatives (1973–1977).
- Oleksandr Oksanchenko, 53, Ukrainian fighter pilot, shot down during the Battle of Kyiv.
- Michel Le Royer, 89, French actor (La Fayette, Nutty, Naughty Chateau, Her Harem).
- Eleonore Schönborn, 101, Austrian politician.
- Nancy Achin Sullivan, 63, American politician, member of the Massachusetts Senate (1991–1993).
- Irina Tsvila, 52, Ukrainian artist and soldier.
- Dimitris Tsovolas, 79, Greek politician, minister of finance (1985–1989), cancer.
- Richard S. Varga, 93, American mathematician.
- Dick Versace, 81, American basketball coach (Bradley Braves, Indiana Pacers), executive (Vancouver/Memphis Grizzlies), and sportscaster.

=== 26 ===
- Ralph Ahn, 95, American actor (Lawnmower Man 2: Beyond Cyberspace, Amityville: A New Generation, New Girl).
- Santha Bhaskar, 82, Indian-born Singaporean dancer and choreographer.
- Tova Borgnine, 80, Norwegian-born American cosmetics executive.
- Jean-Luc Cairon, 60, French Olympic gymnast (1984) and convicted sex offender.
- Jānis Cakuls, 95, Latvian Roman Catholic prelate, apostolic administrator (1990–1991), and auxiliary bishop (1991–1993) of Riga.
- Moss Cass, 95, Australian politician, MP (1969–1983), minister for the environment (1972–1975) and media (1975).
- Barrie R. Cassileth, 83, American cancer researcher, complications of Alzheimer's disease.
- Inna Derusova, 51, Ukrainian military medic, shot.
- Michail Goleminov, 65, Bulgarian pianist, conductor and composer.
- Yūsuke Kawazu, 86, Japanese actor (Cruel Story of Youth, The Human Condition, Godzilla vs. Mechagodzilla II).
- Carroll Ketchum, 84, American politician, member of the Vermont House of Representatives (2001–2005).
- Carol Lazzaro-Weis, 72, American scholar and translator.
- Lee O-young, 88, South Korean critic and novelist, minister of culture (1989–1990), cancer.
- Luboš Lom, 57, Czech Olympic cyclist (1988).
- Evgeny Maslin, 84, Russian general.
- Gilbert Moevi, 87, French footballer (FC Girondins de Bordeaux).
- Kevin Neufeld, 61, Canadian rower, Olympic champion (1984), cancer.
- Sunny Obazu-Ojeagbase, 71, Nigerian publisher and author.
- Danny Ongais, 79, American Hall of Fame racing driver (NHRA, CART), heart failure.
- Duckson Puslas, 31, Sri Lankan footballer (national team).
- Andy Remic, 50, British author, cancer.
- Ingo Renner, 81, German-born Australian glider pilot.
- Paddy Roberts, 82, Irish footballer (Shelbourne).
- Antonio Seguí, 88, Argentine cartoonist and painter.
- Snootie Wild, 36, American rapper ("Yayo", "Made Me"), shot.
- Srihadi Soedarsono, 90, Indonesian painter.
- Beth Sulzer-Azaroff, 92, American psychologist.
- Nick Tesco, 66, British singer (The Members).
- Donald Walter Trautman, 85, American Roman Catholic prelate, auxiliary bishop of Buffalo (1985–1990) and bishop of Erie (1990–2011).

=== 27 ===
- Herman Abdullah, 71, Indonesian politician, mayor of Pekanbaru (2001–2011).
- Ichiro Abe, 99, Japanese judoka.
- Alan Anderson, 82, Scottish footballer (Heart of Midlothian, Millwall, national team).
- Yahya Atan, 67, Malaysian Olympic field hockey player (1984), stroke.
- Dennis Barton, 82, Canadian politician, Alberta MLA (1971–1975).
- Hans-Christian Biallas, 65, German politician and Protestant theologian, president of the Klosterkammer Hannover.
- Richard C. Blum, 86, American investor, lung cancer.
- Ketil Børde, 87, Norwegian diplomat, ambassador to Switzerland (1985–1989) and Sweden (1994–2000).
- Veronica Carlson, 77, British actress (Dracula Has Risen from the Grave, The Horror of Frankenstein, Frankenstein Must Be Destroyed) and model.
- José Carlos Castanho de Almeida, 91, Brazilian Roman Catholic prelate, bishop of Itumbiara (1987–1994) and Araçatuba (1994–2003).
- Marcel Conche, 99, French philosopher.
- Charles Csuri, 99, American artist, pioneer of computer art.
- Ned Eisenberg, 65, American actor (Law & Order: Special Victims Unit, Limitless, Flags of Our Fathers), bile duct cancer.
- Kenneth B. Ellerbe, 61, American fire chief (DC FEMS).
- Leona Farris, 104, American educator.
- Brian Fawcett, 77, Canadian writer (Cambodia: A Book for People Who Find Television Too Slow) and cultural analyst.
- Marietta Giannakou, 70, Greek politician, minister of health (1990–1991) and education (2004–2007), MEP (2009–2014).
- Ken Grandberry, 70, American football player (Chicago Bears).
- Dick Guindon, 86, American cartoonist.
- Hanna Havrylets, 63, Ukrainian composer.
- Teiko Inahata, 91, Japanese poet.
- Peter Klæboe, 92, Norwegian chemist.
- Fred Lasher, 80, American baseball player (Minnesota Twins, Detroit Tigers, Cleveland Indians).
- Gaetano Giani Luporini, 85, Italian composer, complications from COVID-19.
- MC Skibadee, 47, British electronic music artist and MC.
- Joseph J. Nahra, 94, American judge.
- Sonny Ramadhin, 92, Trinidad and Tobago cricketer (West Indies).
- Ronald Roskens, 89, American academic, chancellor of University of Nebraska Omaha (1972–1977) and president of the University of Nebraska system (1977–1989).
- Robert M. Schaefer, 91, American politician, member (1959–1967) and speaker (1965–1967) of the Washington House of Representatives.
- Oleksii Seniuk, 47, Ukrainian military officer, air raid.
- Ramasamy Subramaniam, 82, Malaysian Olympic middle-distance runner (1964, 1968).
- Hanna Sumska, 88, Ukrainian actress.
- Victor Tatarskiy, 82, Russian radio and television presenter.
- Mahmood Ashraf Usmani, 70, Pakistani Islamic scholar, jurist, and author.
- Manouchehr Vossough, 78, Iranian actor and film producer, cancer.
- Kent Waldrep, 67, American college football player (TCU Horned Frogs) and disability rights activist.
- Harald Weinrich, 94, German classical scholar.
- Marie Weir, 95, Scottish field hockey player.
- Lari Williams, 81, Nigerian actor (The Village Headmaster), poet and playwright.
- Nick Zedd, 63, American filmmaker (Geek Maggot Bingo), author and painter, cirrhosis, cancer, and hepatitis C.

=== 28 ===
- Jordie Albiston, 60, Australian poet.
- Ignacio Alcorta, 84, Spanish Olympic rower.
- Anthony Appleyard, 78–79, British scholar.
- Kirk Baily, 59, American actor (Salute Your Shorts, Bumblebee, Trigun), complications of lung cancer.
- Abdullatief Barnes, 80, South African cricketer (Transvaal).
- Peter Caras, 80, American illustrator, cancer.
- Mary Coombs, 93, British computer programmer.
- Grenville Davey, 60, English sculptor, winner of the Turner Prize (1992).
- Ike Delock, 92, American baseball player (Boston Red Sox, Baltimore Orioles).
- Abuzed Omar Dorda, 77, Libyan politician, prime minister (1990–1994).
- Mike Fair, 79, American politician, member of the Oklahoma House of Representatives (1967–1969, 1979–1987) and Senate (1989–2005).
- Norihiro Inoue, 63, Japanese voice actor (Aoi, Dai-Guard, Negima!?).
- Merril Jessop, 86, American bishop, de facto head of the Fundamentalist Church of Jesus Christ of Latter Day Saints (2007–2011).
- Dan Kearns, 65, Brazilian-born Canadian football player (Edmonton Eskimos, Winnipeg Blue Bombers), pancreatic cancer.
- Radhika Khanna, 47, Indian-born American fashion designer, entrepreneur, and author, multiple organ failure.
- Kim Jung-ju, 54, South Korean businessman, founder of Nexon.
- Leonhard Lapin, 74, Estonian architect, artist, and poet.
- Sir William Lithgow, 2nd Baronet, 87, Scottish industrialist.
- Roger Lonsdale, 87, British literary scholar and academic.
- John H. MacNaughton, 92, American Anglican prelate, bishop of Episcopal Diocese of West Texas (1987–1995), stroke.
- Sir Christopher Mallaby, 85, British diplomat, ambassador to Germany (1988–1993) and France (1993–1996).
- Mac Martin, 96, American bluegrass musician.
- Hans Menasse, 91, Austrian footballer (First Vienna FC, national team).
- John A. Murphy, 95, Irish historian and politician, senator (1977–1982, 1987–1993).
- Jimmy O'Donnell, 81, Irish Gaelic footballer (Seán McDermotts, Cootehill Celtic).
- Dominique Paturel, 90, French actor (The Devil and the Ten Commandments, The Seven Deadly Sins, Good Little Girls).
- Bhichai Rattakul, 95, Thai politician, minister of foreign affairs (1975, 1976) and twice deputy prime minister, lung cancer.
- Leo Reed, 83, American football player (Houston Oilers, Denver Broncos) and labor leader.
- Osbert de Rozario, 97, Singaporean Olympic field hockey player (1956).
- Harold Simon, 101, South African pilot.
- Andrei Sukhovetsky, 47, Russian general, shot.
- Priscilla Reuel Tolkien, 92, British literary preservationist.
- Yadlapati Venkata Rao, 102, Indian politician, Andhra Pradesh MLA (1967–1983) and MP (1998–2004).
