= Yoo Sang-yeol =

South Korean public official (1940–2022)

Vice-Minister of Construction
- In office 7 September 1993 – 23 December 1994
- Preceded by: Lee Kun-young
- Succeeded by: position abolished

Personal details
- Born: 10 September 1940 Cheongju, Korea, Empire of Japan
- Died: 14 February 2022 (aged 81)
- Party: Independent
- Education: Seoul National University

Yoo Sang-yeol (Korean: 유상열; 10 September 1940 – 14 February 2022) was a South Korean public official. An independent, he served as Vice-Minister of Construction from 1993 to 1994. He died on 14 February 2022, at the age of 81.
