= Tatsu Ishimoda =

Japanese politician (1924–2022)

- 石母 田達

Member of the House of Representatives
- In office 10 December 1972 – 9 December 1976
- Preceded by: Makoto Monji
- Succeeded by: Seat abolished
- Constituency: Kanagawa 1st

Personal details
- Born: 11 May 1924 Ishinomaki, Miyagi, Japan
- Died: 12 February 2022 (aged 97) Atsugi, Kanagawa, Japan
- Party: Communist
- Education: Tokyo College of Industrial Arts

Tatsu Ishimoda (Japanese: 石母田 達 Ishimoda Tatsu; 11 May 1924 – 12 February 2022) was a Japanese politician. A member of the Japanese Communist Party, he served in the House of Representatives from 1972 to 1976. He died in Atsugi on 12 February 2022, at the age of 97.
