= Franz Krug =

German politician (1935–2022)

Member of the Landtag of Bavaria
- In office 1970–1978

Landrat of Erlangen-Höchstadt
- In office 1978–2002
- Preceded by: Georg Daßler
- Succeeded by: Eberhard Irlinger

Personal details
- Born: 26 March 1935 Amberg, Bavaria, Germany
- Died: 19 February 2022 (aged 86)
- Party: CSU

Franz Krug (26 March 1935 – 19 February 2022) was a German politician.

A member of the Christian Social Union in Bavaria, he served in the Landtag of Bavaria from 1970 to 1978. He died in February 2022, at the age of 86.
