= Evgeny Maslin =

Russian general (1937–2022)

- Евгений Петрович Маслин

Personal details
- Born: May 20, 1937 Novotomnikovo, Tambov region, RSFSR, USSR
- Died: February 26, 2022 (aged 84) Moscow, Russia

Military service
- Rank: Colonel general

Evgeny Maslin (1937-2022) was a Soviet Russian general. He was the head of the 12th Chief Directorate of the Russian Ministry of Defense. He was responsible for the security of nuclear weapons. After the collapse of the USSR, Maslin secured the nuclear arsenal without letting a single weapon be lost.
