= Francisco Dias Alves =

Brazilian politician (1936–2022)

Member of the Chamber of Deputies of Brazil
- In office 1982–1988

Member of the Legislative Assembly of São Paulo
- In office 1978–1982

Personal details
- Born: 20 January 1936; Baturité, Brazil
- Died: 24 February 2022 (aged 86); Guarulhos, Brazil
- Political party: PMDB
- Education: Seminário Presbiteriano Conservador de São Paulo

Francisco Dias Alves (20 January 1936 – 24 February 2022) was a Brazilian politician.

A member of the Brazilian Democratic Movement, he served in the Chamber of Deputies from 1982 to 1988. He died in Guarulhos on 24 February 2022, at the age of 86.
