= Daniel Sili =

Brazilian water polo player 1930–2022

Daniel José Sili
Personal information
- Nationality: Brazilian
- Born: 25 October 1930
- Died: 8 February 2022 (aged 91); Rio de Janeiro, Brazil

Sport
- Sport: Water polo

Daniel José Sili (25 October 1930 – 8 February 2022) was a Brazilian water polo player. He competed in the men's tournament at the 1952 Summer Olympics.
