= Mikhail Naidov =

Russian miner and politician (1932–2022)

Chairman of the Executive Committee of the Kemerovo Regional Council of People's Deputies
- In office May 1990 – December 1990

Personal details
- Born: Mikhail Ivanovich Naidov; 20 October 1932 Tyazhinsky District, West Siberian Krai, Russian SFSR, Soviet Union
- Died: 13 February 2022 (aged 89) Kemerovo, Russia
- Party: CPSU
- Education: Tomsk Polytechnic University
- Occupation: Miner

Mikhail Ivanovich Naidov (Russian: Михаи́л Ива́нович На́йдов; 20 October 1932 – 13 February 2022) was a Soviet and Russian miner and politician.

A member of the Communist Party, he served as chairman of the executive committee of the Kemerovo Regional Council of People's Deputies from May to December 1990. He died in Kemerovo on 13 February 2022, at the age of 89.
