= Duane Raver =

American printmaker and illustrator

- Born: Duane DeForest Raver, Jr; May 4, 1927; Newton, Iowa, United States
- Died: February 15, 2022 (aged 94); Garner, North Carolina, United States
- Education: Iowa State College
- Known for: Printmaker; Illustrator

Duane Raver was an American artist and illustrator, known for his watercolor illustrations of fish.

== Life ==
He was the only child of Duane Raver Sr. and Mabel Raver. Raver recalls, “My folks were very active and often went down to the lake so I fished from a very early age. In those days, we fished small ponds, lakes and rivers for small and largemouth bass, northern pike, panfish, walleye and channel catfish”.

The family moved to Ames, Iowa where he produced his first book of fish illustrations titled “Sketches of American Game Fish” in 1943.

Raver received a degree in fishery biology from Iowa State College in 1949. His first job was with the North Carolina Wildlife Commission working in the fisheries division for ten years. In 1960 he transferred to the commission’s Education Division as editor and illustrator for North Carolina magazine.

Duane may have created one of the most viewed art works of all time. Two identical billboards of a salmon over 60 feet long, with the caption "Not Quite Actual Size", have faced north- and south-bound traffic for decades. Occupants of some 36,600 vehicles per day (13,359,000 cars per year) on South Carolina Interstate 95 crossing the Santee Cooper River have had a chance to see this art.
