= Siegfried Martsch =

German politician (1953–2022)

Member of the Landtag of North Rhine-Westphalia
- In office 31 May 1990 – 1 June 2000

Personal details
- Born: 17 September 1953 Bochum, North Rhine-Westphalia, West Germany
- Died: 15 February 2022 (aged 68)
- Party: Alliance 90/The Greens

Siegfried Martsch (17 September 1953 – 15 February 2022) was a German politician.

A member of Alliance 90/The Greens, he served in the Landtag of North Rhine-Westphalia from 1990 to 2000. Martsch died on 15 February 2022, at the age of 68.
