= Sérgio Barcelos =

Brazilian politician (1943–2022)

Member of the Chamber of Deputies of Brazil
- In office 1991–2003

Personal details
- Born: Sérgio Cerqueira Barcelos; 4 October 1943; Rio de Janeiro, Brazil
- Died: 8 February 2022 (aged 78); João Pessoa, Brazil
- Political party: DEM
- Education: Federal University of Rio de Janeiro

Sérgio Cerqueira Barcelos (4 October 1943 – 8 February 2022) was a Brazilian politician. A member of the Democrats, he served in the Chamber of Deputies from 1991 to 2003. He died in João Pessoa on 8 February 2022, at the age of 78.
