= Réal Ouellet =

Canadian writer and academic (1935–2022)

- Born: 29 September 1935; Saint-Alexandre-de-Kamouraska, Quebec, Canada
- Died: 20 February 2022 (aged 86); Quebec City, Quebec, Canada
- Education: Université Laval; University of Paris
- Occupations: Writer; Professor

Réal Ouellet (29 September 1935 – 20 February 2022) was a Canadian writer and academic.

== Biography ==
After his studies in psychology and literature at the Université Laval, Ouellet earned a doctorate from the University of Paris in 1963 with a thesis titled "Les relations humaines dans l’œuvre de Saint-Exupéry". That year, he became teaching literature at Laval. He was one of the founders of Études littéraires in 1968.

Ouellet was a specialist on literature, theatre, and literary representations of New France and the French West Indies in the 17th and 18th centuries. He was the first president of the Société canadienne d’étude du dix-huitième siècle and organized its congress in 1975 in Quebec City. In 1988, he received a Killam grant in 1988 from the Canada Council. In January 2007 he co-led a symposium titled "Représentation, métissage et pouvoir. La dynamique coloniale des échanges entre Autochtones, Européens et Canadiens" alongside Denys Delâge.

He worked in collaboration with Université Laval. his book and research were focusing on "travel relation and novel".

Ouellet died in Quebec City on 20 February 2022, at the age of 86.

== Publications ==
=== Studies ===
- Les relations humaines dans l’œuvre de Saint-Exupéry (1971)
- L’univers du roman (1972)
- Lettres persanes (1976)
- L’Univers du théâtre (1978)
- La Relation de voyage en Amérique (xvie – xviiie siècles). Au carrefour des genres (2010)

=== Collective works ===
- Rhétorique et conquête missionnaire. Le jésuite Paul Lejeune (1993)
- Culture et colonisation en Amérique du Nord : Canada, États-Unis, Mexique. Culture and Colonization in North America : Canada, United States, Mexico (1994)
- Transferts culturels et métissages. Amérique/Europe, xvie – xxe siècles (1996)
- Mythes et géographies des mers du Sud. Études suivies de l'Histoire des navigations aux Terres australes de Charles de Brosses (2006)

=== Novels ===
- L’aventurier du hasard. Le baron de Lahontan. Roman (1996)
- Regards et dérives. Nouvelles (1997)
- Par ailleurs. Nouvelles (2005)
- Cet océan qui nous sépare (2008)
