= Uli Sckerl =

German politician (1951–2022)

Member of the Landtag of Baden-Württemberg
- In office 26 March 2006 – 14 February 2022

Personal details
- Born: Hans-Ulrich Sckerl; 28 April 1951 Weinheim, Baden-Württemberg, West Germany
- Died: 14 February 2022 (aged 70)
- Party: Alliance 90/The Greens

Hans-Ulrich Sckerl (28 April 1951 – 14 February 2022) was a German politician. A member of Alliance 90/The Greens, he served in the Landtag of Baden-Württemberg from 2006 to 2022. He died on 14 February 2022, at the age of 70.
