= Thomas Demakos =

American judge (died 2022)

Thomas Demakos (November 28, 1923 – February 22, 2022) was an American judge. He was a justice of the New York State Supreme Court.
