= Peter Klæboe =

Norwegian chemist (1929–2022)

Peter Klæboe (17 November 1929 – 27 February 2022) was a Norwegian chemist.

He took the cand.real. degree at the University of Oslo in 1956, the PhD degree at the University of Oklahoma in 1960 and the dr.philos. degree in Oslo in 1967. Upon returning from the US in 1960 he was hired as lecturer at the University of Oslo, advancing to docent and then professor of physical chemistry. His pioneering field was molecular spectroscopy. Retiring as a professor in 1999, he continued his research nonetheless and had by his 80th birthday penned 350 scientific articles. He was a fellow of the Norwegian Academy of Science and Letters and the Royal Norwegian Society of Sciences and Letters.

Klæboe died on 27 February 2022.
