= Peggy Luhrs =

American women's rights activist (1945–2022)

Peggy Luhrs (April 6, 1945 – February 22, 2022) was an American women's rights activist. She was active in the feminist and gay rights movements in Vermont from the 1970s until her death.

== Biography ==
Luhrs, was born in Los Angeles, California, on April 6, 1945, with three younger sisters, just before the end of World War II. Her father was with the Merchant Marines and his family moved around depending on his assignment, finally settling in Saugerties, New York, where Luhrs grew up.

She met Terry, the man who would become her husband, in high school. She attended the Pratt Institute in New York City, so she could study architecture and design. In 1969, the young couple moved to St. George, Vermont, for his job at IBM. The next winter, they had a son and named him Justin. In 1972 (before the Roe v. Wade case), Luhrs and lawyer Sandy Baird worked together to start the Vermont Women's Health Center, which was "the first clinic in the state to offer safe, legal abortions."

By 1973, she had come out as a lesbian and had already left her husband.

Luhrs died on February 22, 2022 of pancreatic cancer.
