= Edmur Mesquita =

Brazilian politician (1954–2022)

Member of the Legislative Assembly of São Paulo
- In office 1999–2003

Personal details
- Born: Edmur Mesquita de Oliveira; 17 May 1954; São Paulo, Brazil
- Died: 12 February 2022 (aged 67); São Paulo, Brazil
- Political party: PSDB

Edmur Mesquita de Oliveira (17 May 1954 – 12 February 2022) was a Brazilian politician.

== Biography ==
A member of the Brazilian Social Democracy Party, he served in the Legislative Assembly of São Paulo from 1999 to 2003. He died of COVID-19 in São Paulo on 12 February 2022, at the age of 67.
