= Hans-Ulrich Klose (politician, born 1935) =

German politician (1935–2022)

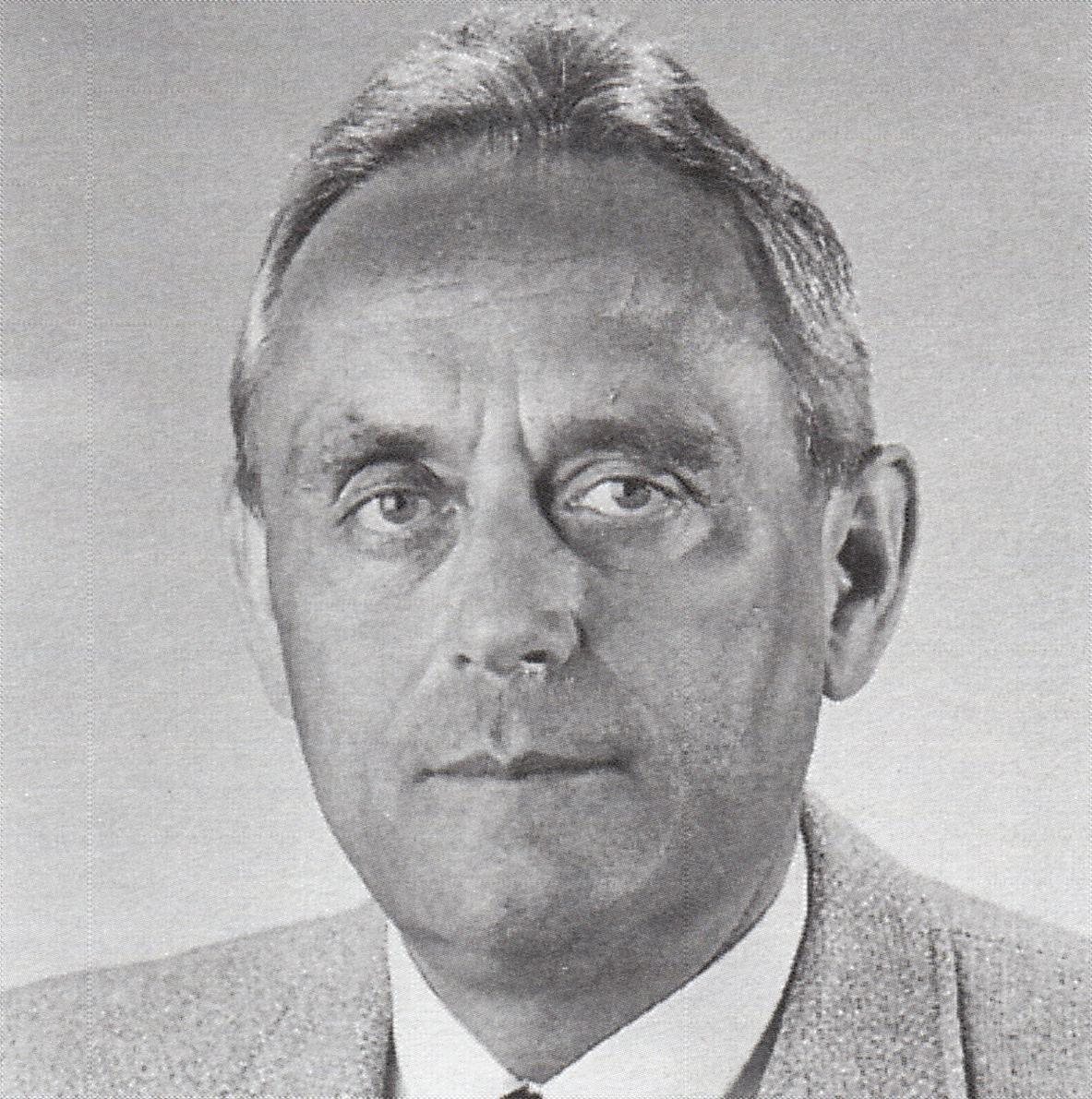
- Klose in 1994

Member of the Landtag of North Rhine-Westphalia
- In office 30 May 1985 – 8 June 2005

Personal details
- Born: 29 March 1935 Rüdersdorf, Brandenburg, Prussia, Germany
- Died: 7 February 2022 (aged 86) Korschenbroich, North Rhine-Westphalia, Germany
- Party: CDU

Hans-Ulrich Klose (29 March 1935 – 7 February 2022) was a German politician. A member of the Christian Democratic Union of Germany, he served in the Landtag of North Rhine-Westphalia from 1985 to 2005. He died in Korschenbroich on 7 February 2022, at the age of 86.
