= Iryna Tsvila =

Ukrainian artist and soldier (1969–2022)

- Born: Iryna Volodymyrivna Tsvila; 29 April 1969; Kyiv Oblast, Ukrainian SSR, USSR
- Died: 25 February 2022 (aged 52); Kyiv, Ukraine
- Military career
- Allegiance: Ukraine
- Branch: Ukrainian Ground Forces
- Service years: 2014–2022
- Conflicts: Russo-Ukrainian War; War in Donbas; Russian invasion of Ukraine; Battle of Kyiv †

Iryna Volodymyrivna Tsvila (Ukrainian: Ірина Володимирівна Цвіла; 29 April 1969 – 25 February 2022) was a Ukrainian teacher and photographer who participated in the Russo-Ukrainian War to defend her country against the Russian invasion and was killed during the Battle of Kyiv.

== Biography ==
After receiving pedagogical education, she worked at the Kyiv International School "Meridian" until 2006.

In 2014, she volunteered during the war in Donbas for the Sich Battalion. She later served for the Ukrainian Army's National Response Guard Brigade. During the Dignity Revolution and the Russo-Ukrainian War, she devoted herself to photography, holding a personal exhibition in the village of Sviatopetrivske in 2017. She was also involved in writing, participating in the publication of the book Voices of War. Stories of Veterans. In 2018, she founded the brand VERBA.

=== Works ===
- Voices of War. Stories of veterans

== Death ==
Tsvila was killed on 25 February 2022, during the Battle of Kyiv, during an armored assault by Russian troops. Her husband also died during the Battle of Kyiv.

== Bibliography ==
- Подобна, Є. Дівчата зрізають коси. Книга спогадів. — К.І.С, 2020. — 346 с. — ISBN 978-617-7420-39-1
- Чабарай, Г. Ірина Цвіла: «Можливо, я розридаюся, коли настане перемога, а доти не час киснути» // Тиждень. — 2017. — 14 вересня.
- Максименко, О. «Цвісти за будь-яких обставин» — війна і повернення Ірини Цвілої // Без броні. — 2020. — 20 січня.
- Бурлакова, В. Ірина Цвіла, позивний Лінза: «Для всіх, хто пройшов війну, це загальна біда — повернутися у „цивілізоване“ життя. Бо де воно цивілізованіше — ще питання» // Цензор. — 2021. — 5 жовтня.
