= Pedro Villagrán =

Spanish politician (1946–2022)

Pedro Villagrán (23 June 1946 – 11 February 2022) was a Spanish politician who served as a PSOE Senator for Málaga province between 2004 and 2013. Born in Jerez de la Frontera Spain, he died on 11 February 2022, at the age of 75.
