= Hubert de Ravinel =

Canadian television producer, writer, and academic (1934–2022)

- Born: 22 February 1934; Fontainebleau, France
- Died: 14 February 2022 (aged 87); Montreal, Quebec, Canada
- Education: Université de Montréal
- Occupations: Television producer Writer; Professor

Hubert de Ravinel CQ (22 February 1934 – 14 February 2022) was a French-born Canadian television producer, writer, and academic.

== Biography ==
De Ravinel earned a law degree in 1956, a degree in political science in 1957, and a master's degree in andragogy from the Université de Montreal in 1991. He arrived in Montreal in 1962 after spending two years in Chicago. He was a co-founder of the International Federation of Little Brothers of the Poor in Canada and served as its Director until 1977. He was also a founding member of the Association québécoise de gérontologie. From 2000 to 2010, he was an administrator of the Conseil d’administration de l'organisme Baluchon Alzheimer, serving as treasurer and vice-president.

A gerontology professor from 1977 to 1988, de Ravinel also published a weekly column in La Presse from January 1986 to December 1989. He published four essays on aging, a topic on which he also hosted numerous radio and television programs on Ici Radio-Canada Télé and Télé-Québec.

De Ravinel died in Montreal, Quebec on 14 February 2022, at the age of 87.

== Publications ==
- Vieillir au Québec (1972)
- L'Âge démasqué (1979)
- Les Enfants du bout de la vie (1980)
- Au fil de l'âge (1988)
- Le Défi de vieillir (1991)
- Le Courage et la Tendresse (1992)
- Car j'aime et j'espère (1994)
- Vieillir au masculin (1997)
- Le Temps libéré (2003)

== Distinctions ==
- Knight of the Order of La Pléiade (1995)
- Prix Claire-Bonenfant (1999)
- Knight of the National Order of Quebec (2002)
- Knight of the Legion of Honour (2012)
