= Sugnya Bhatt =

Indian judge (1941–2022)

Sugnya Kamalashanker Bhatt (25 March 1941 – 10 February 2022) was an Indian judge of the Gujarat High Court.

== Biography ==
Born in the British Raj, she was the first woman to be nominated as additional judge in the Gujarat High Court on 17 October 1994. She was transferred to the Kerala High Court and required to join on 4 November 1994 which she did not. So she ceased to be a judge on 2 January 1995. She headed a commission for the inquiry in the 2013 Gujarat surveillance case which ended in October 2014 before its completion of work following a petition.

She also headed the State Commission of Backward Classes in Gujarat.

Bhatt died from multiple organ dysfunction syndrome at a private hospital in Ahmedabad, while being treated for COVID-19, on 10 February 2022, at the age of 80.
