= Mohamed Haddou Chiguer =

Moroccan politician (1932–2022)

Minister of the Interior
- In office 1975 – October 1977
- Preceded by: Mohamed Benhima
- Succeeded by: Mohamed Benhima

Personal details
- Born: 1932 Khémisset Province, Morocco
- Died: 15 February 2022 (aged 89–90) Rabat, Morocco
- Party: RNI

Mohamed Haddou Chiguer (Arabic: محمد حدو الشيكر; 1932 – 15 February 2022) was a Moroccan politician. A member of the National Rally of Independents, he served as Minister of the Interior from 1975 to 1977. He died in Rabat on 15 February 2022, at the age of 90.
