= Zurab Chumburidze =

Georgian philologist and critic (1926–2022)

Zurab Chumburidze (Georgian: ზურაბ ჭუმბურიძე; 6 July 1926 – 12 February 2022) was a Georgian philologist and critic.

== Life and career ==
Chumburidze was born in Terjola District on 6 July 1926. He graduated from the faculty of philology at Tbilisi State University in 1949. He became a Doctor of Sciences in the field of philology in 1969, and a professor from 1970. Chumburidze was a member of Communist Party of the Soviet Union from 1948, as well as the Georgian Writers' Union. He authored nearly 250 literary and linguistic works, much of which were published as books.

Chumburidze died on 12 February 2022, at the age of 95.

== Works ==
His major works include:

- "Issues about Georgian literary language and style" (1956; debut publication)
- "Literary language and art" (1962)
- "What is your name?" (1966, 1971, 1982, 1992, 2003)
- "Literary writings" (1975)
- "The mercy of mother language" (1982)
- "Following Georgian manuscripts" (1983, 2000)
- "The story of old Georgian manuscripts" (1983, 2000)
- "A future tense in Kartvelian languages" (1986)

== Sources ==
- (Georgian) What is your name?, Zurab Chumburidze, back-cover, 2003.
- (Georgian) Georgian Soviet Encyclopedia, v. 11, pg. 408, Tbilisi, 1987.
