= J. Bradley Morris =

American politician (1937–2022)

J. Bradley Morris (September 10, 1937 – February 25, 2022) was an American politician.

Bradley lived in Medford, Oregon, and graduated from University of Oregon. He served in the United States Army reserves with the rank of captain. Morris served in the Oregon House of Representatives from 1973 to 1977.
