= Gustavo Mhamed =

Argentine footballer (1977–2022)

Personal information
- Date of birth: 28 January 1977
- Place of birth: Buenos Aires, Argentina
- Date of death: 9 February 2022 (aged 45)
- Position: Forward

Youth career
- Vélez Sarsfield

Senior career*
Years	Team	Apps	(Gls)
1997–1999	Huracán		
1999–2000	Defensa y Justicia		
- * Club domestic league appearances and goals

Gustavo Mhamed (28 January 1977 – 9 February 2022) was an Argentine professional football player and coach who played for Vélez Sarsfield, Huracán and Defensa y Justicia, and later coached at Quilmes. Mhamed died from colon cancer on 9 February 2022, at the age of 45. His son Lucas Mhamed is also a professional footballer.
