= Janet Cooling =

American painter (1951–2022)

- Born: October 14, 1951; Chester, Pennsylvania
- Died: February 25, 2022 (aged 70); Richmond, Virginia
- Known for: Painting
- Website: jcooling.com

Janet Cooling (1951–2022) was an American painter and educator.

Cooling was born on October 14, 1951, in Chester, Pennsylvania. She attended the Pratt Institute and the School of the Art Institute of Chicago. Cooling taught from 1985 to 2009 at San Diego State University. Cooling died on February 25, 2022, in Richmond, Virginia.

In 1981 her work was included in the exhibition Young Americans at the Allen Memorial Art Museum at Oberlin College. In 1982 her work was included in the exhibition Extended Sensibilities: Homosexual Presence in Contemporary Art at the New Museum in New York. Her work was included in the 1984 Venice Biennale.

Cooling was influenced by the Chicago Imagists. Her 1979 painting "Bed of Dreams" is described in the The power of feminist art: the American movement of the 1970's history and impact.
