= Jiří Linha =

Czech conductor (1930–2022)

Jiří Linha (15 November 1930 – 10 February 2022) was a Czech conductor, composer, vocalist and chorus master, the head of vocal-instrumental band Linha Singers.

== Life and career ==
Born in Prague, Czechoslovakia, on 15 November 1930, Linha began his musical education at the age of six by playing the violin. Soon he joined the Prague Philharmonic Children's Choir as a soprano and, toward the end of World War II, as a baritone to the Czech Choir conducted by Jan Kűhn. Both ensembles regularly cooperated with the Czech Philharmonic Orchestra and Prague Symphony Orchestra.

He studied at the Faculty of Education of Charles University, from where he left in 1953 as a music teacher for secondary school. In 1961 he left for the Artistic Ensemble of the Ministry of the Interior (USMV). In 1964, he founded the band Linha Singers.

Linha died in his sleep on 10 February 2022, at the age of 91.
