= Joe B. Cannon =

American politician

Member of the Texas House of Representatives
- In office January 13, 1959 – January 12, 1965

Personal details
- Born: January 29, 1935 Thornton, Texas, U.S.
- Died: February 8, 2022 (aged 87)
- Party: Democratic
- Profession: lawyer

Joe Barnett Cannon (January 29, 1935 – February 8, 2022) was an American politician. He served as a Democratic member in the Texas House of Representatives from 1959 to 1964.
