= Michele McNally =

American photojournalism editor (1955–2022)

- Born: June 25, 1955
- Died: February 18, 2022 (aged 66); Yonkers, New York
- Education: Queens College (theater arts); Brooklyn College
- Occupation: Photojournalism editing
- Employer(s): Time-Life (1980s); Fortune Magazine 1986–2004; The New York Times 2004–2018
- Title: Director of Photography
- Awards: · Jim Gordon Editor of the Year Award · Angus McDougall Visual Editing Award 2015, 2017

Michele McNally (June 25, 1955 – February 18, 2022) was an American photojournalism editor at The New York Times. She was the director of photography there during a 14-year span from 2004 to 2018. During her tenure, the newspaper won numerous awards for photojournalism, including Pulitzer Prizes, George M. Polk Awards, Overseas Press Club honors, Emmys and other citations for excellence in photography. As an editor, she won the Jim Gordon Editor of the Year Award for photojournalism from the National Press Photographers Association, and she won the Angus McDougall Visual Editing Award in 2015 and 2017. She was active as a judge in numerous photography journalism competitions. Her work often involved looking carefully at particular photographs to ascertain whether any of them had been staged or doctored, and she often weighed in on issues regarding particular photos. In evaluating photographs for news pictures, when depicting real situations and events, her policy was not to permit photographs which were staged.

McNally died in Yonkers, New York, on February 18, 2022, at the age of 66.
