= Jeong Changhwa =

South Korean politician (1940–2022)

Member of the National Assembly of South Korea
- In office 3 April 1998 – 29 May 2004
- In office 11 April 1981 – 29 May 1992

Personal details
- Born: 7 July 1940 Uiseong County, Korea, Empire of Japan
- Died: 15 February 2022 (aged 81)
- Party: DJP; GNP
- Education: Yonsei University

Jeong Changhwa (Korean: 정창화; 7 July 1940 – 15 February 2022) was a South Korean politician. A member of the Democratic Justice Party and later the Grand National Party, he served in the National Assembly from 1981 to 1992 and again from 1998 to 2004. He died on 15 February 2022, at the age of 81.
