= La Verite (horse) =

Horse

- Sire: Readly Express
- Grandsire: Ready Cash
- Dam: Bardot Boko
- Damsire: Dream Vacation
- Sex: Gelding
- Foaled: 24 May 2017
- Died: 9 February 2022 (aged 4)
- Country: Sweden
- Colour: Bay
- Breeder: Kontio Stable AB
- Owner: Kontio Stable AB
- Trainer: Katja Melkko
- Record: 12: 7-2-0
- Earnings: 386,000 SEK

La Verite (24 May 2017 – 9 February 2022) was a Swedish-bred American standardbred sired by Swedish champion Readly Express.

== Background ==
La Verite was a bay gelding sired by Readly Express and his grandsire was French champion trotter Ready Cash. La Verite's dam, Bardot Boko was sired by Dream Vacation. He was bred and owned in Sweden by Kontio Stable AB, and was sent to training with Katja Melkko.

== Racing career ==
=== 2021: four-year-old season ===
La Verite made his racing debut as a four-year-old on 4 January 2021 on Färjestadstravet, in which he came fifth. He took his first victory in his second start, on 12 March 2021 on Romme travbana, after he went off stride. During his four-year-old season he raced 10 times with a record of 5-2-0.

=== 2022: five-year-old season ===
As a four-year-old he took two victories in a row. In his third start on 9 February 2022 at Solvalla he went off as a post-favorite. In the race, driver Jorma Kontio felt that something was wrong with La Verite, that went down in the middle of the race. La Verite later died at the track, at the age of 4.

== Pedigree ==
Pedigree of La Verite
Sire (Sweden) Readly Express 2012	(France) Ready Cash; 2005	(France) Indy de Vive	(France) Viking's Way
Sire (Sweden) Readly Express 2012	(France) Ready Cash; 2005	(France) Indy de Vive	(France) Tekiflore
Sire (Sweden) Readly Express 2012	(France) Ready Cash; 2005	(France) Kidea	(France) Extreme Dream
Sire (Sweden) Readly Express 2012	(France) Ready Cash; 2005	(France) Kidea	(France) Doceanide du Lilas
Sire (Sweden) Readly Express 2012	(Sweden) Caddie Dream; 2005	(Italy) Viking Kronos	(United States) American Winner
Sire (Sweden) Readly Express 2012	(Sweden) Caddie Dream; 2005	(Italy) Viking Kronos	(United States) Conch
Sire (Sweden) Readly Express 2012	(Sweden) Caddie Dream; 2005	(Sweden) Fatima Lavec	(United States) Sugarcane Hanover
Sire (Sweden) Readly Express 2012	(Sweden) Caddie Dream; 2005	(Sweden) Fatima Lavec	(United States) Margit Lobell
Dam (Sweden) Bardot Boko 2008	(United States) Dream Vacation; 1997	(United States) Pine Chip	(United States) Arndon
Dam (Sweden) Bardot Boko 2008	(United States) Dream Vacation; 1997	(United States) Pine Chip	(United States) Pine Speed
Dam (Sweden) Bardot Boko 2008	(United States) Dream Vacation; 1997	(United States) Dream On Victory	(United States) Valley Victory
Dam (Sweden) Bardot Boko 2008	(United States) Dream Vacation; 1997	(United States) Dream On Victory	(United States) Crown Dream
Dam (Sweden) Bardot Boko 2008	(France) Margherita Rosa; 2000	(France) Abo Volo	(France) Lurabo
Dam (Sweden) Bardot Boko 2008	(France) Margherita Rosa; 2000	(France) Abo Volo	(France) Grande Volo
Dam (Sweden) Bardot Boko 2008	(France) Margherita Rosa; 2000	(France) Bruyere Rose	(France) Mon Tourbillon
Dam (Sweden) Bardot Boko 2008	(France) Margherita Rosa; 2000	(France) Bruyere Rose	(France) Quadrique
