= Juan Iglesias Marcelo =

Spanish politician (1931–2022)

Mayor of Cáceres
- In office 23 May 1983 – 30 June 1987
- Preceded by: Manuel Domínguez Lucero
- Succeeded by: Carlos Sánchez Polo

Member of the Senate of Spain
- In office 20 April 1979 – 30 June 1987
- Constituency: Cáceres

Personal details
- Born: Juan Ángel Iglesias Marcelo; 1 March 1931 Cáceres, Spain
- Died: 1 February 2022 (aged 90) Cáceres, Spain
- Party: PSOE

Juan Ángel Iglesias Marcelo (1 March 1931 – 1 February 2022) was a Spanish politician. A member of the Spanish Socialist Workers' Party, he served in the Senate of Spain from 1979 to 1987 and was mayor of Cáceres from 1983 to 1987. He died in Cáceres on 1 February 2022, at the age of 90.
