= Frank Pietrzok =

German politician (1964–2022)

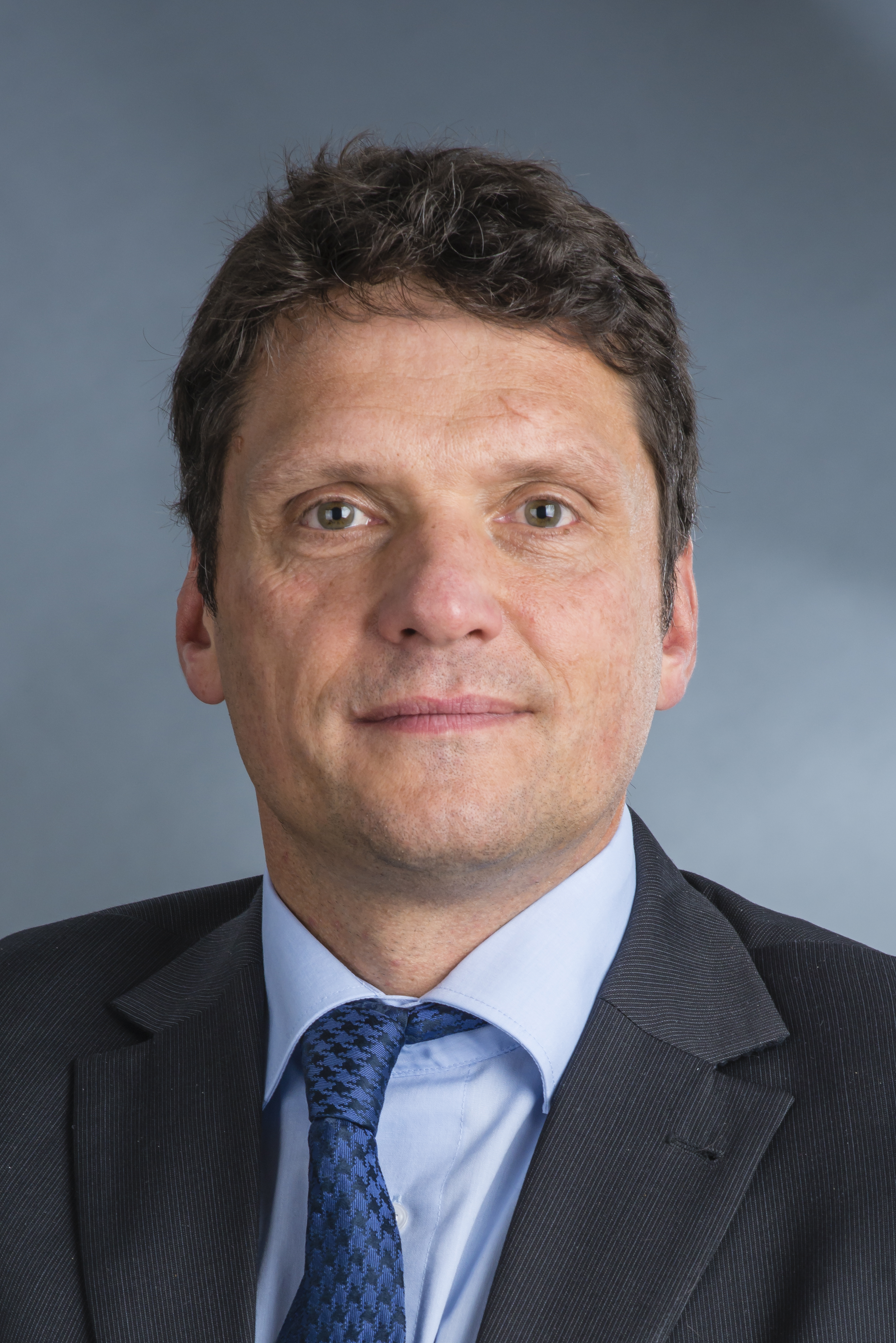
- Pietrzok in 2015

Member of the Bürgerschaft of Bremen
- In office June 1999 – 8 November 2005

Personal details
- Born: 20 June 1964 Xanten, North Rhine-Westphalia, West Germany
- Died: 3 February 2022 (aged 57) La Unión, Colombia
- Party: SPD
- Education: Free University of Berlin

Frank Pietrzok (20 June 1964 – 3 February 2022) was a German politician.

A member of the Social Democratic Party of Germany, he served in the Bürgerschaft of Bremen from 1999 to 2005. He died in a paragliding accident at La Unión, Colombia, on 3 February 2022, at the age of 57.
