= Christel Apostel =

German politician (1935–2022)

Landrat of Wesel
- In office 1994–1996
- Preceded by: Werner Röhrich
- Succeeded by: Bernhard Nebe

Personal details
- Born: 15 May 1935 Duisburg, Rhineland, Prussia, Germany
- Died: 5 February 2022 (aged 86) Moers, North Rhine-Westphalia, Germany
- Party: SPD

Christel Apostel (15 May 1935 – 5 February 2022) was a German politician. A member of the Social Democratic Party of Germany, she served as Landrat of Wesel from 1994 to 1996. She died in Moers on 5 February 2022, at the age of 86.
