= Valentin Bakulin =

Russian politician (1945–2022)

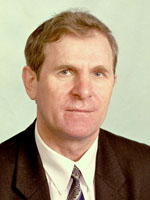
- Bakulin in 2008

Member of the Federation Council of Russia
- In office 9 January 2001 – 19 February 2004
- Succeeded by: Yury Smirnov

Member of the Supreme Soviet of the Soviet Union
- In office 1989–1991

Personal details
- Born: Valentin Ivanovich Bakulin; 30 January 1945 Ivanovo, Russian SFSR, Soviet Union
- Died: 24 February 2022 (aged 77) Ivanovo, Russia
- Party: CPSU; CPRF

Valentin Ivanovich Bakulin (Russian: Валентин Иванович Бакулин; 30 January 1945 – 24 February 2022) was a Russian politician. A member of the Communist Party of the Russian Federation, he served in the Federation Council from 2001 to 2004. He died in Ivanovo on 24 February 2022, at the age of 77.
