= Eberhard Kube =

German mime artist (1936–2022)

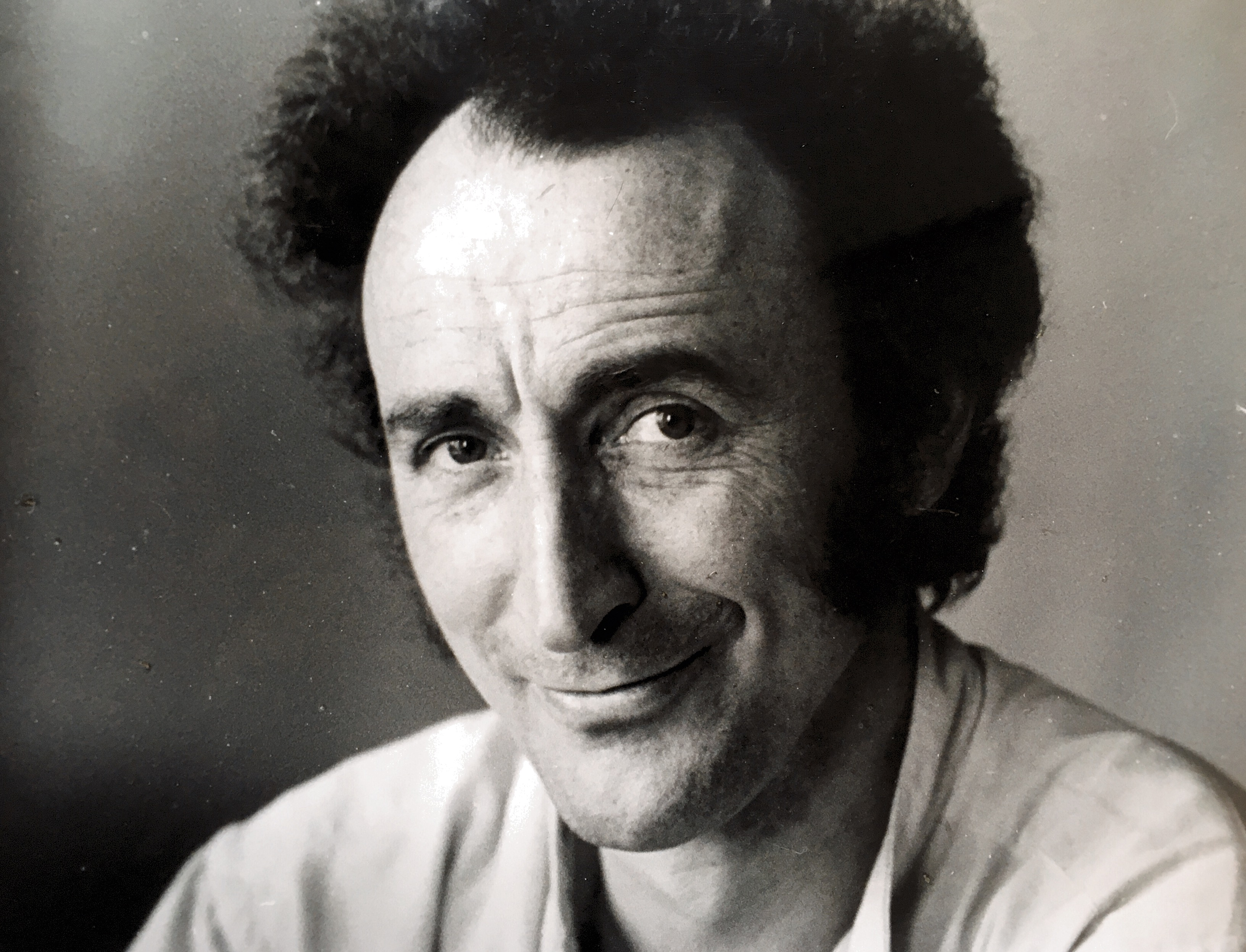
Eberhard Hermann Wilhelm Kube

Eberhard Hermann Wilhelm Kube (19 April 1936 – 22 February 2022) was a German mime artist.

Born in Berlin-Lichtenberg, Brandenburg, Prussia, Germany, Kube died in Wrechen, Mecklenburg-Vorpommern, Germany, on 22 February 2022, at the age of 85.

== Partial filmography ==
- 1964: Die Suche nach dem wunderbunten Vögelchen
- 1964: Harlekin, Pantalone und wir (Kurzfilm)
- 1971: Faxenmacher
- 1976: Mario und der Zauberer (Mário a kúzelník)
- 1978: Electra (Kurzfilm)
- 1978: Der besondere Tag
- 1982: Die Horatier und die Kuriatier
- 1982: Der Diener zweier Herren
