= Marie Chamming's =

French writer and resistant (1923–2022)

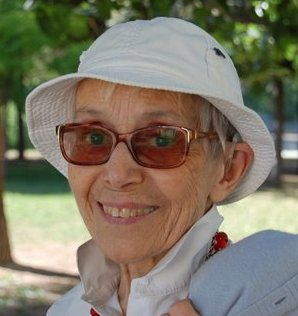
- Chamming's in 2014
- Born: Marie Henriette Françoise Krebs; 3 May 1923; 7th arrondissement of Paris, France
- Died: 15 February 2022 (aged 98)
- Occupations: Writer; Resistant

Signature
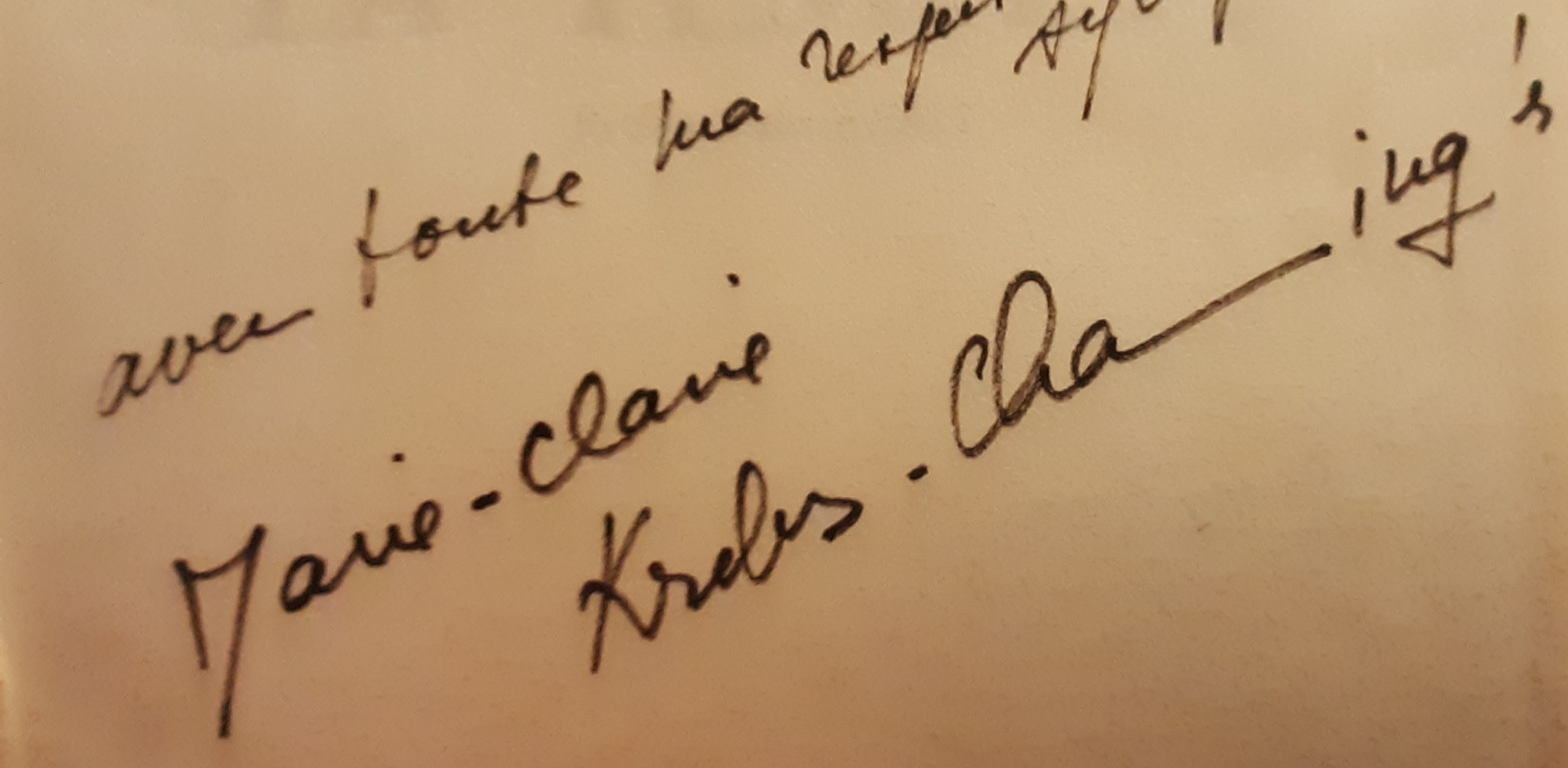

Marie Chamming's (née Krebs, 3 May 1923 – 15 February 2022) was a French writer and resistant.

== Biography ==
The daughter of entrepreneur Louis Krebs, Marie Henriette Françoise Krebs was born on 3 May 1923 in the 7th arrondissement of Paris. During World War II, she became a special liaison to Special Air Service Captain Henri Deplante while a part of the French Resistance. She met an SAS paratrooper, Georges Chamming's, whom she married at the Liberation of Paris. She then wrote J'ai choisi la tempête, for which she won the Prix Vérité in 1964.

Chamming's died on 15 February 2022, at the age of 98.

== Distinctions ==
- Resistance Medal (1946)
- Prix Vérité (1964)
- Knight of the Ordre National du Mérite (1972)
- Officer of the National Order of the Legion of Honour (2020)
