= Raymond Uytterhaeghe =

French wrestler

Personal information
- Nationality: French
- Born: 25 October 1947; Hellemmes-Lille, France
- Died: 19 February 2022 (aged 74)

Sport
- Sport: Wrestling

Raymond Uytterhaeghe (25 October 1947 – 19 February 2022) was a French wrestler. He competed in two events at the 1968 Summer Olympics.
