= Sophie Rieger =

German architect and politician (1933–2022)

Member of the Landtag of Bavaria
- In office 1990–1998

Personal details
- Born: 26 December 1933 Beuthen, Upper Silesia, Prussia, Germany
- Died: 2 February 2022 (aged 88)
- Party: Alliance 90/The Greens
- Education: Technical University of Munich

Sophie Rieger (26 December 1933 – 2 February 2022) was a German politician.

A member of Alliance 90/The Greens, she served in the Landtag of Bavaria from 1990 to 1998. She died on 2 February 2022, at the age of 88.
