= Javier Gómara =

Spanish politician (1927–2022)

Javier Gómara (7 January 1927 – 12 February 2022) was a Spanish politician who served as a Deputy.
