= Hélio Rosas =

Brazilian politician (1929–2022)

Member of the Chamber of Deputies of Brazil
- In office March 1987 – 1999

Personal details
- Born: Hélio César Rosas; 24 March 1929 Pindamonhangaba, Brazil
- Died: 8 February 2022 (aged 92)
- Party: PMDB
- Education: Centro Universitário das Faculdades Metropolitanas Unidas

Hélio César Rosas (24 March 1929 – 8 February 2022) was a Brazilian politician.

A member of the Brazilian Democratic Movement, he served in the Chamber of Deputies from 1987 to 1999. He died on 8 February 2022, at the age of 92.
