= Makoto Hasebe (politician) =

Japanese politician (1951–2022)

- 長谷部 誠

Mayor of Yurihonjō
- In office 17 April 2009 – 16 April 2021
- Preceded by: Hiroshi Yanagida
- Succeeded by: Takanobu Minato

Member of the Akita Prefectural Assembly
- In office 30 April 1983 – 2005
- Constituency: Yuri District

Personal details
- Born: 17 February 1951 Iwaki, Akita, Japan
- Died: 12 February 2022 (aged 70)
- Party: Independent
- Education: Doshisha University

Makoto Hasebe (Japanese: 長谷部誠 Hasebe Makoto; 17 February 1951 – 12 February 2022) was a Japanese politician.

An independent, he served as mayor of Yurihonjō from 2009 to 2021. He died on 12 February 2022, at the age of 70.
