= Jörgen Kolni =

Swedish sailor (born 1946)

Personal information
- Nationality: Swedish
- Born: 19 July 1946 Copenhagen, Denmark

Sport
- Sport: Sailing

Jörgen Kolni (born 19 July 1946) is a Swedish Olympic and World Class Sailor sailor. He competed at the 1968 Summer Olympics and the 1976 Summer Olympics. and several World Championships.
