= Ted Mappus =

American politician (1926–2022)

Theodore Tobias Mappus Jr. (July 20, 1926 – February 11, 2022) was an American politician.

Mappus was born in Charleston, South Carolina, and graduated from Charleston High School. He went to Newberry College and graduated from Duke University in 1946. He served in the United States Navy during World War II and the Korean War and was conmmissioned a lieutenant. Mappus was involved with the insurance business. He served in the South Carolina House of Representatives from 1987 to 1991 and was a Republican. He died on February 11, 2022, in Charleston, South Carolina, at the age of 95.
