= Julie Saul =

American gallerist (1954–2022)

Julie Saul (December 31, 1954 – February 4, 2022) was an American gallerist. She founded her gallery, Julie Saul Projects, in 1986. The gallery is a major exhibitor of traditional and avant-garde contemporary photography. Saul was born in Tampa, Florida. She died from leukemia on February 4, 2022, in Tampa, Florida, at the age of 67.
