= Antonio Miró =

Catalan fashion designer (1947–2022)

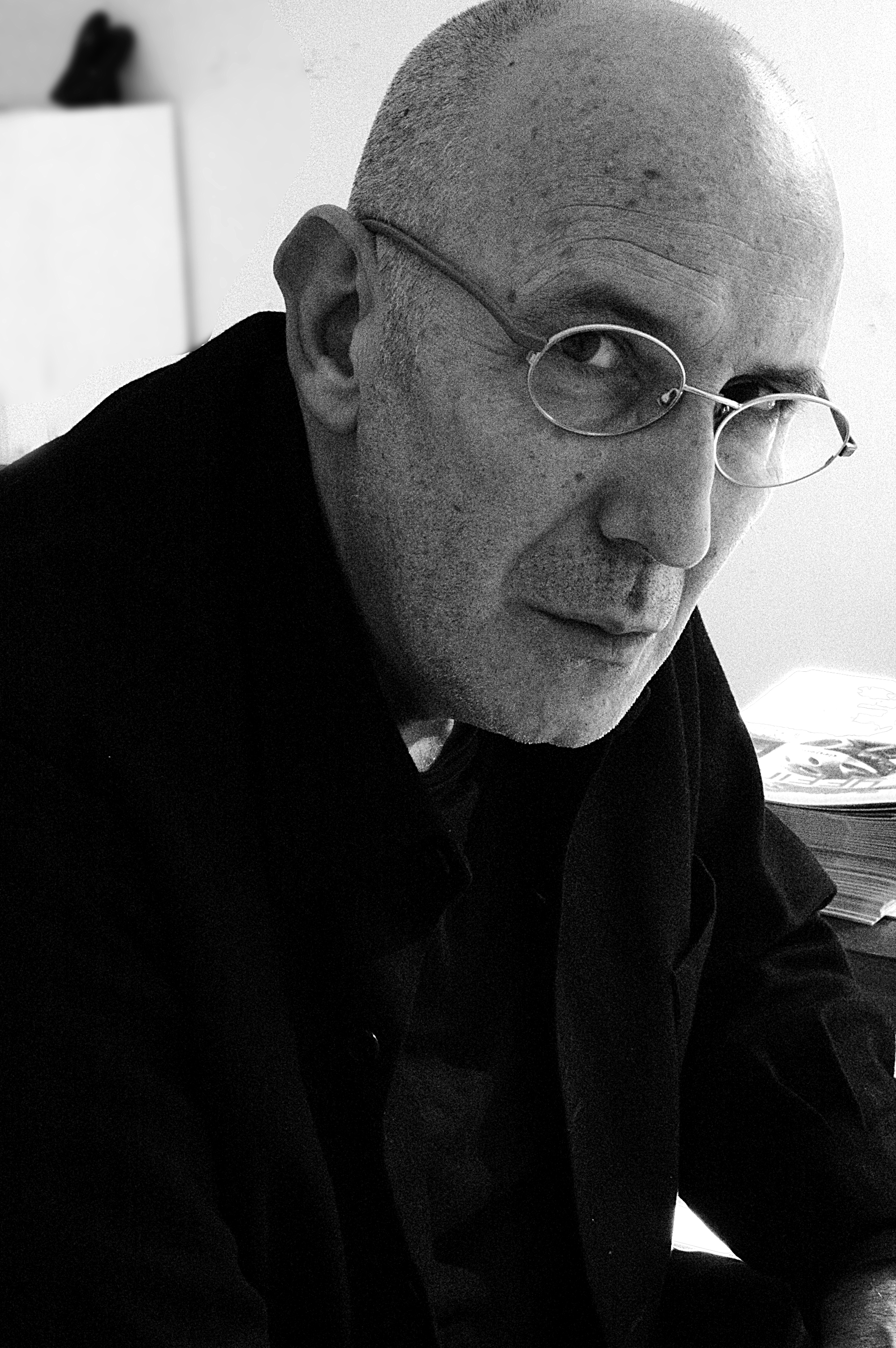
Antonio Miró in 2005

Antonio Miró (18 March 1947 – 3 February 2022) was a Spanish fashion designer.

Miró was born in Sabadell, Spain. He designed the costumes for the 1979 Spanish drama Caniche and other films. He launched his own fashion brand in 1979. Miró also designed the costumes for the opening ceremony of the 1992 Summer Olympics in Barcelona.

Miró died on 3 February 2022 in Barcelona, Spain from a heart attack, at the age of 74.
