= Francesco Samà =

Italian politician (1940–2022)

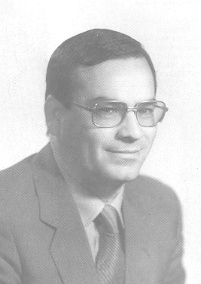

Member of the Chamber of Deputies of Italy
- In office 12 July 1983 – 22 April 1992

Mayor of Melissa
- In office 1964–1970

Personal details
- Born: 2 July 1940 Melissa, Italy
- Died: 10 February 2022 (aged 81) Crotone, Italy
- Party: PCI

Francesco Samà (2 July 1940 – 10 February 2022) was an Italian politician.

A member of the Italian Communist Party, he served in the Chamber of Deputies from 1983 to 1992. He died in Crotone on 10 February 2022, at the age of 81.
