= Georges Bertin =

French sociologist (1948–2022)

- Born: 25 February 1948; France
- Died: 2 February 2022 (aged 73); France
- Occupation: Sociologist

Georges Bertin (25 February 1948 – 2 February 2022) was a French sociologist.

== Biography ==
Bertin was Director of Research in Social Sciences at the Conservatoire national des arts et métiers (CNAM) in Pays-de-la-Loire from 2006 to 2016. He was a member of GRECO CRI and directed the Cercle de Recherches Anthropologiques sur l'Imaginaire (CRAI). CRAI succeeded the Groupe de Recherches sur l'Imaginaire de l'Ouest, which he founded in 1994.

He was also a member of the International Arthurian Society and, from 1990 to 2013, was co-president of the Association francophone internationale de recherches scientifiques en éducation. He was founding president of CENA, becoming honorary president after his retirement. From 2006 to 2016, he was executive director of the sociology journal Esprit critique.

Bertin was particularly focused on myths and symbolism. He coordinated a research mission with CNAM and the University of Angers titled the Mouvement Utopia. He was a member of the Imaginales d'Épinal. In 2010, he began working on transcultural questions from a diachronic and synchronic perspective. He also worked on cross-cultural phenomena and societal relations through networking.

He died on 2 February 2022, at the age of 73.

== Works ==
- Promenades en Normandie avec Lancelot du Lac (1988)
- Guide des Chevaliers de la Table Ronde en Normandie (1991)
- Rites et sabbats en Normandie (1992)
- L'imaginaire de l'âme (1996)
- La quête du Saint Graal et l'imaginaire (1997)
- Pentecôte, de l'intime au social (1998)
- Apparitions-disparitions (1999)
- Développement local et intervention sociale (2003)
- Druides : les Maîtres du temps, les prêtres et leur postérité (2003)
- L'imaginaire social à la dérive (2003)
- Fantômes et apparitions (2004)
- Un imaginaire de la pulsation : lecture de Wilhelm Reich (2004)
- Les grandes images : lecture de Carl Gustav Jung (2005)
- La Pierre et le Graal, une expérience de quête initiatique (2006)
- Imaginaire et santé (2007)
- La légende arthurienne, racines et réceptions (2007)
- Un glossaire arthurien (2010)
- Figures de l'Autre (2010)
- Présence de l'Invisible, les apparitions dans l'Ouest (2010)
- La coquille et le bourdon, essai sur les imaginaires du chemin de Compostelle (2010)
- De la Quête du Graal au Nouvel Age (2010)
- Imaginaires et Utopies entre marges et marchés, en codirection avec Nizia Villaça (2010)
- Les imaginaires du Nouveau Monde (2011)
- Pour une autre Politique culturelle, institution et développement (2011)
- Imaginaires, Savoirs, Connaissance, collectif codirigé avec Yvon Pesqueux (2012)
- Cultures et communications interculturelles (2012)
- La tribu du lâcher prise, mythes et symboles du chemin de Compostelle (2014)
- Figures de l'Utopie, histoire et actualité (2014)
- Une société du sacré? Sacralisation, désacralisations et re-sacralisations dans les sociétés contemporaines (2014)
- La société transculturelle (2014)
- Actualité de la mythocritique (2014)
- La quête des chevaliers et dames de la Table Ronde (2015)
- De quête du Graal en Avalon (2016)
- Entre caverne et lumière, essai sur l'imaginaire en loge de francs-maçons (2017)
- Un imaginaire transculturel (2018)
- De la loge aux réseaux, la franc-maçonnerie au défi des siècles (2019)
- Herméneutiques et dynamiques de sens, L'année de la recherche en sciences de l'éducation (2019)
- Topologies de l'imaginal (2020)
- Le Sacré, actualité, de sacralisation, actualisations (2020)
- Le Christ s'est arrêté à Dozulé (2020)
- Figures de Perceval (2021)
- Mystères de l'Apocalypse de Jean (2021)
