= Francesca Tardioli =

Italian diplomat (1965–2022)

Ambassador of Italy to Australia
- In office 16 September 2019 – 20 February 2022

Personal details
- Born: 8 September 1965 Foligno, Umbria, Italy
- Died: 20 February 2022 (aged 56) Foligno, Umbria, Italy

Francesca Tardioli (8 September 1965 – 20 February 2022) was an Italian diplomat. She served as Ambassador of Italy to Australia from 2019 to 2022.

== Biography ==
Tardioli was born in Foligno, Umbria and graduated from the University of Perugia with a degree in political science. In 1991, she joined the Ministry of Foreign Affairs. From November 1995 to August 1998, she was consul in Nuremberg. Later, from September 2004 to July 2008, she was Permanent Representative of NATO.

Tardioli died after falling from a balcony at her home in Foligno on 20 February 2022, at the age of 56.

== Honours ==
=== National honours ===
- 4th Class / Officer: Order of Merit of the Italian Republic: 3 June 2021
