= Harriet S. Shapiro =

American attorney (1928–2022)

Harriet S. Shapiro (September 7, 1928 – February 1, 2022) was an American attorney. She was the first female attorney in the United States Solicitor General’s office. Shapiro died on February 1, 2022, at the age of 93.
