= José Martí Gómez =

Spanish journalist and commentator (1937–2022)

José Martí Gómez (1937 – 22 February 2022) was a Spanish journalist and commentator.

== Early life and education ==
José Martí Gómez was born in Morella, Castellón, Valencian Community, Spain. He graduated with a degree in teaching from the University of Valencia. His studies included analyses of various communication media.

== Career ==
Martí Gómez began his career in journalism in 1963, as an editor for Diario de Barcelona. After two years, he accepted a position with the Castellón newspaper El Periódico Mediterráneo, which was allied with the Movimiento Nacional. In 1970, he was hired by El Correo Catalán.

Martí Gómez wrote for the weekly newspaper Por Favor, contributing satire and political commentary. With the arrival of democracy in Spain, he worked for the newspaper El País. He wrote in the Barcelona newspaper La Vanguardia and participated in the social gatherings of the Cadena SER.

== Personal life and death ==
Martí Gómez died on 22 February 2022, at the age of 84.

== Awards and recognition ==
He was awarded many prizes, most notably the National Prize of Journalism of Catalonia in 2008.

== Works ==
In 2016 he published a book of memoirs, El oficio más hermoso del mundo (The Most Beautiful Post in the World), a memoir addressing five decades of Spanish political, social and cultural life through the lens of journalism in decline.
