= Louis Bourgeois (footballer) =

French footballer (1937–2022)

Personal information
- Date of birth: 31 July 1937
- Place of birth: Billy-Berclau, France
- Date of death: 22 February 2022 (aged 84)
- Place of death: France
- Height: 1.80 m (5 ft 11 in)
- Position: Forward

Senior career*
Years	Team	Apps	(Gls)
1954–1960	Lille		
1960–1963	USL Dunkerque		
1963–1969	Reims		
1969–1971	USL Dunkerque		
1971–1984	US Billy-Berclau		
- * Club domestic league appearances and goals

Louis Bourgeois (31 July 1937 – 22 February 2022) was a French footballer who played as a forward for Lille, USL Dunkerque, Reims, and US Billy-Berclau. He died on 22 February 2022, at the age of 84.

== Honours ==
- Division 2: 1965–66
