= Julia Obermeier =

German politician

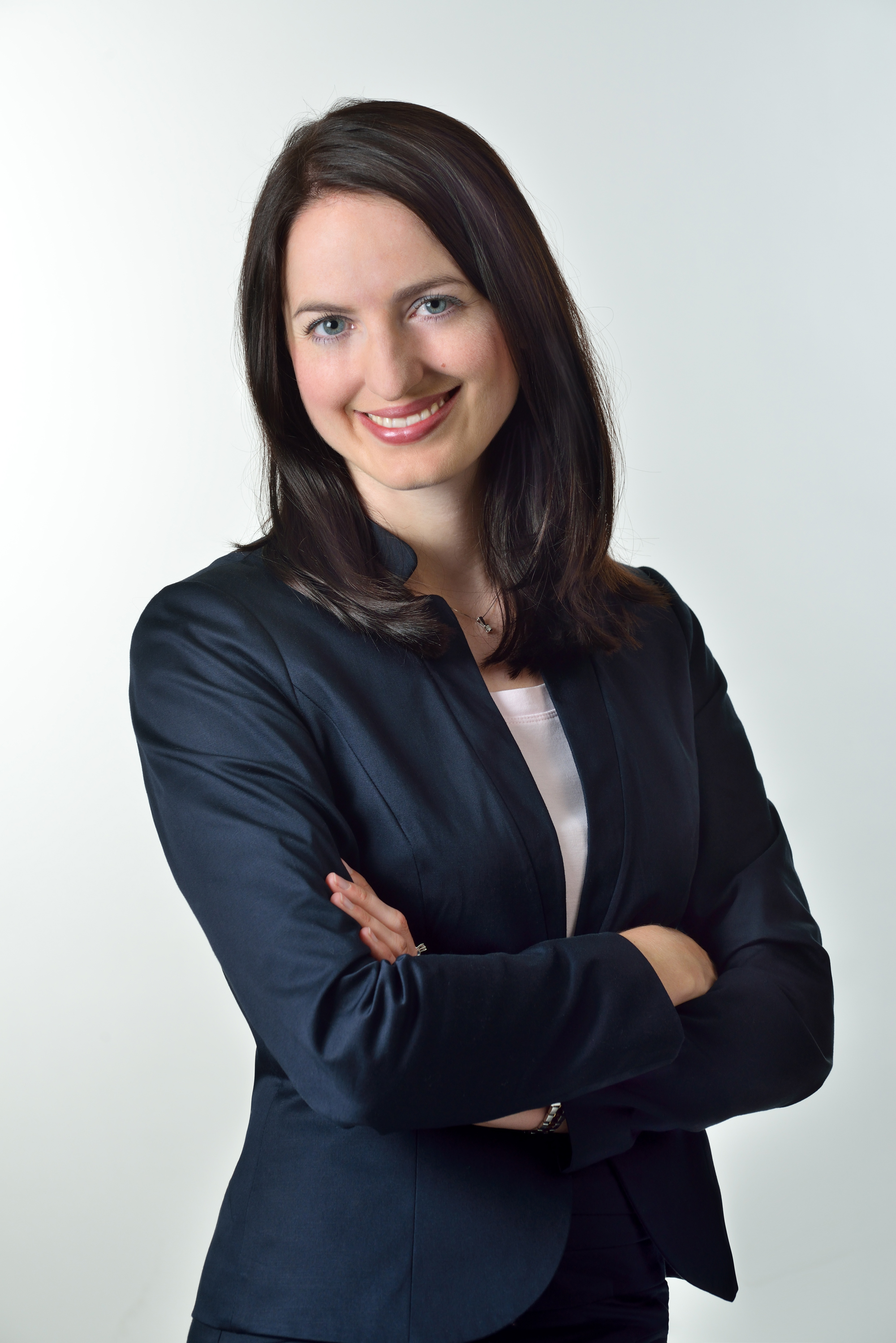
- Bartz in 2013
- Born: Julia Bartz; February 7, 1984 (age 42); Munich, Germany
- Occupation: Politician
- Political party: CSU

Julia Obermeier (born Julia Bartz 7 September 1984) is a German politician (CSU). She was a member of the German parliament (Bundestag) from 2013 to 2017, and was a member of the assembly's defence committee. Since 2015 she has also been a member of the Parliamentary Assembly of the Council of Europe.

== Life ==
Julia Bartz was born in Munich. Between 1990 and 1994 she attended junior school at Maitenbeth, then progressing to the secondary school ("Gymnasium") in Gars am Inn (Mühldorf district) where she remained till passing her school final exams ("Abitur") in 2003. She then, till 2008, studied political sciences, law and sociology at LMU Munich. At the same time, in 2006/2007 she was employed as assistant to the Director for European Research Policy and Innovation with the Degusa Specialist Chemical Company's office in Brussels. After that she worked as a research assistant in the office of the party general secretary. In 2009 she took a position in the "Planning staff" of the CSU group in the Bavarian Parliament ("Landtag"), becoming its deputy head in 2013.

== The party ==
Julia Bartz joined Bavaria's ruling centre-right Christian Social Union (party / CSU) in 2004. She is also a member of the party's Women's Union and Youth Union. Between 2007 and 2013 she served as a member of the executive with the Youth Union for Upper Bavaria. Between 2009 and 2011, and again since 2013, she has been a member of the Bavarian executive of the Youth Union. Between 2013 and 2015 she headed up the secretariat in the regional executive of the Upper Bavarian Women's Union. Since 2015 she has been chair of the regional executive of the Munich-West Women's Union and of the CSU local group in Munich-Aubing where she has lived since her marriage early during 2015.

Julius Obermeier is a member of the recently relaunched CSU Programme and Policy Commission being headed up by Markus Blume. She is a member of the party executive working group on Foreign and Security policy. She is also involved in the party executive working group in Munich on Migration and Integration.

Engaging in local politics, between 2007 and 2015, as Julia Bartz, she was village president for Maitenbeth, and from 2008 until 2015 a member of the Maitenbeth local council. One regional tier up, in 2014 she became a member of the local assembly for Mühldorf (district).

== The Bundestag ==
In the 2013 national Bundestag election the name of Julia Bartz from Mühldorf appeared at place 39 on the CSU list for Bavaria. As at the previous election, the CSU vote share entitled it to 45 seats. Bartz was comfortably elected. She is a member of the Bundestag Defence Committee and an alternate member of the Food and Agriculture Committee. She is a member of the Parliamentary Assembly of the Council of Europe. She is a deputy member of the NATO Parliamentary Assembly and of the Interparliamentary Conference for Joint Foreign and Security Policy and for Joint Security and Defence Policy.

In 2015 the CDU/CSU Bundestag group conscripted her to the council of the foundation trust for the support of exceptional hardship cases in the Federal Army and former (East German) National People's Army. After heavy losses of the CDU/CSU in the 2017 election, she had to quit the parliament.

== Other activities ==
Her own web page lists numerous other memberships and activities, many of a quasi-political character. She has an episcopal mandate to investigate allegations of sexual abuse involving the catholic Military Ordinariate. In 2016, Cardinal Marx, the Archbishop of Munich and Freising, appointed a member of the General Council of the Bavarian Catholic Academy for the ensuing four-year term.

She is also actively involved in other organisations involving welfare and women.

== Personal ==
Julia Obermeier comes from a Roman Catholic family. She has been married since January/February 2015.
