= Haag in Oberbayern =

- Municipality
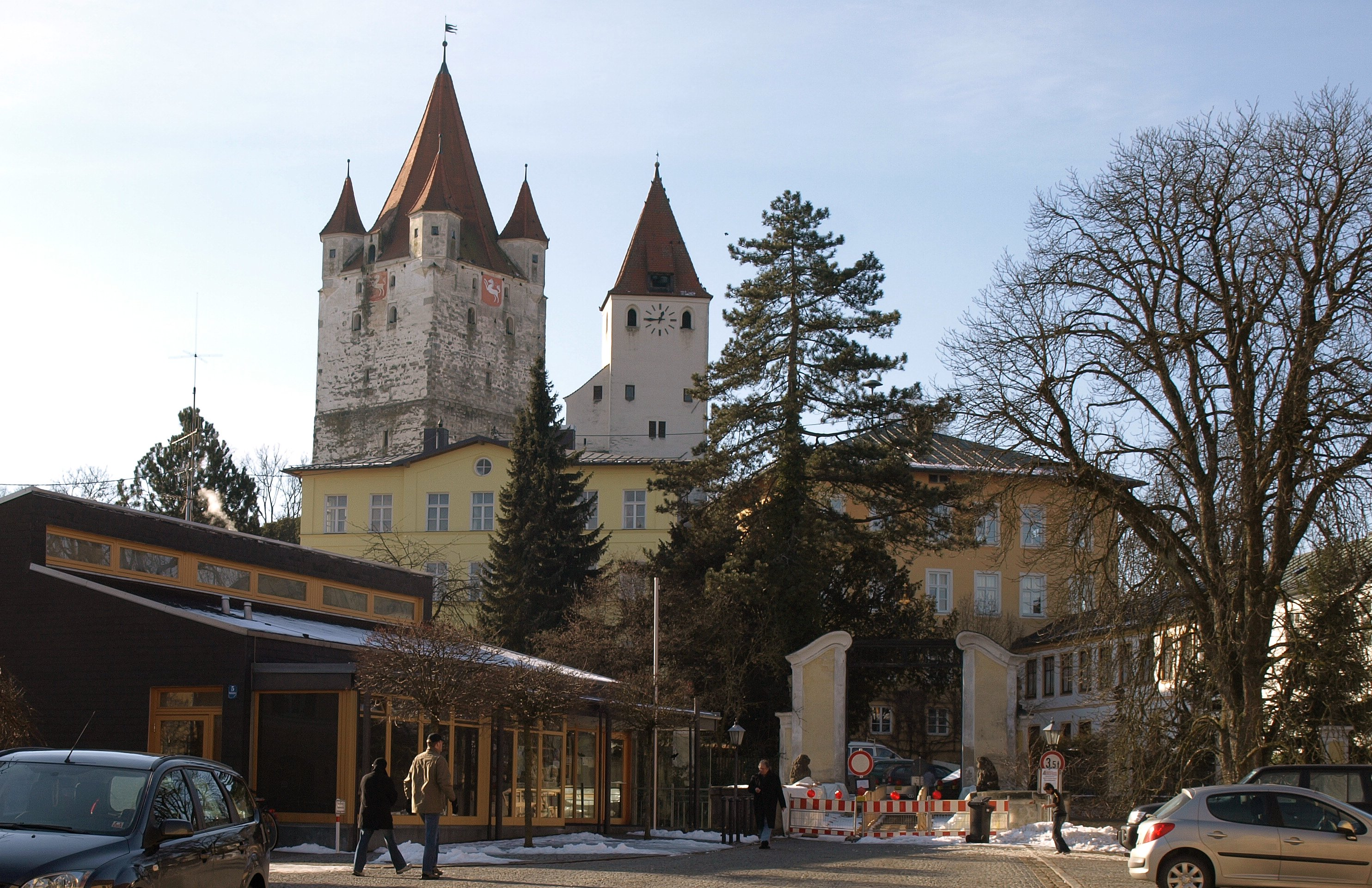
- Haag Castle seen from the market square

- Coat of arms

- Location of Haag in Oberbayern within Mühldorf district
- Interactive map of Haag in Oberbayern
- Location within Germany Location within Bavaria
- Coordinates: 48°10′N 12°11′E
- Country: Germany
- State: Bavaria
- Admin. region: Oberbayern
- District: Mühldorf

Government
  - Mayor (2020–26): Elisabeth Schätz (SPD)

Area
  - Total: 20.37 km^{2} (7.86 sq mi)
- Elevation: 540 m (1,770 ft)

Population (2025-12-31)
  - Total: 6,541
  - Density: 321.1/km^{2} (831.7/sq mi)
- Time zone: UTC+01:00 (CET)
  - Summer (DST): UTC+02:00 (CEST)
- Postal codes: 83527
- Dialling codes: 08072
- Vehicle registration: MÜ
- Website: www.markt-haag.de

Haag in Oberbayern (German pronunciation: [ˈhaːk ʔɪn ˈʔoːbɐˌbaɪɐn], lit. 'Haag in Upper Bavaria') is a municipality in the district of Mühldorf in Bavaria in Germany, in December 2013 the municipality had a population of 6359.

== Geography ==
Haag is situated about 50 km east of Munich, 15 km south of Dorfen, 21 km west of Waldkraiburg, 14 km north of Wasserburg am Inn, and 32 km from the county seat in Mühldorf. Via the Bundesstraße 15 the distance to Landshut is 48 km. Rosenheim is 38 km away.

== Notable residents ==
- Karl Gebhardt (1897–1948), Nazi SS physician who conducted criminal medical experiments, executed for war crimes
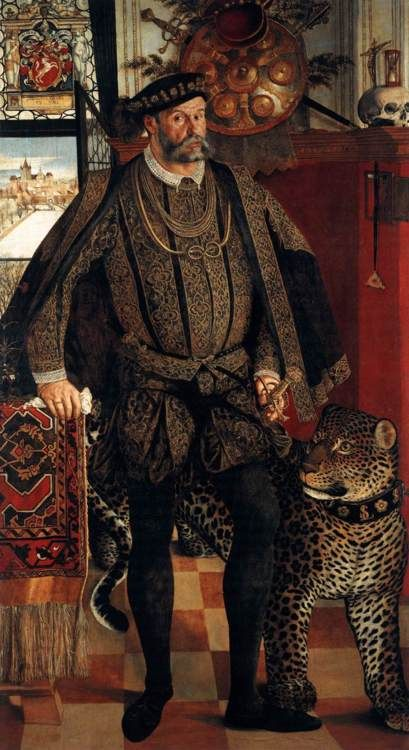
Ladislaus or Laßla von Fraunberg by Hans Muelich, 1557

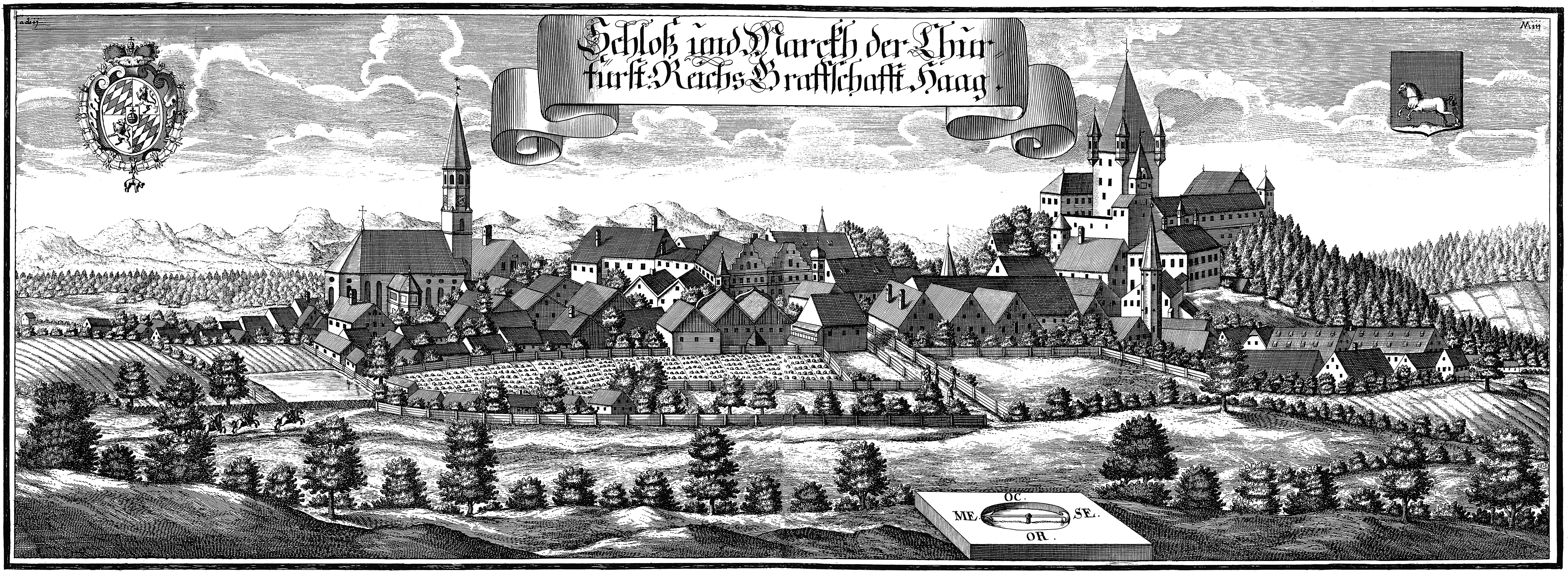
“Marckh Haag” by Michael Wening, 18th century

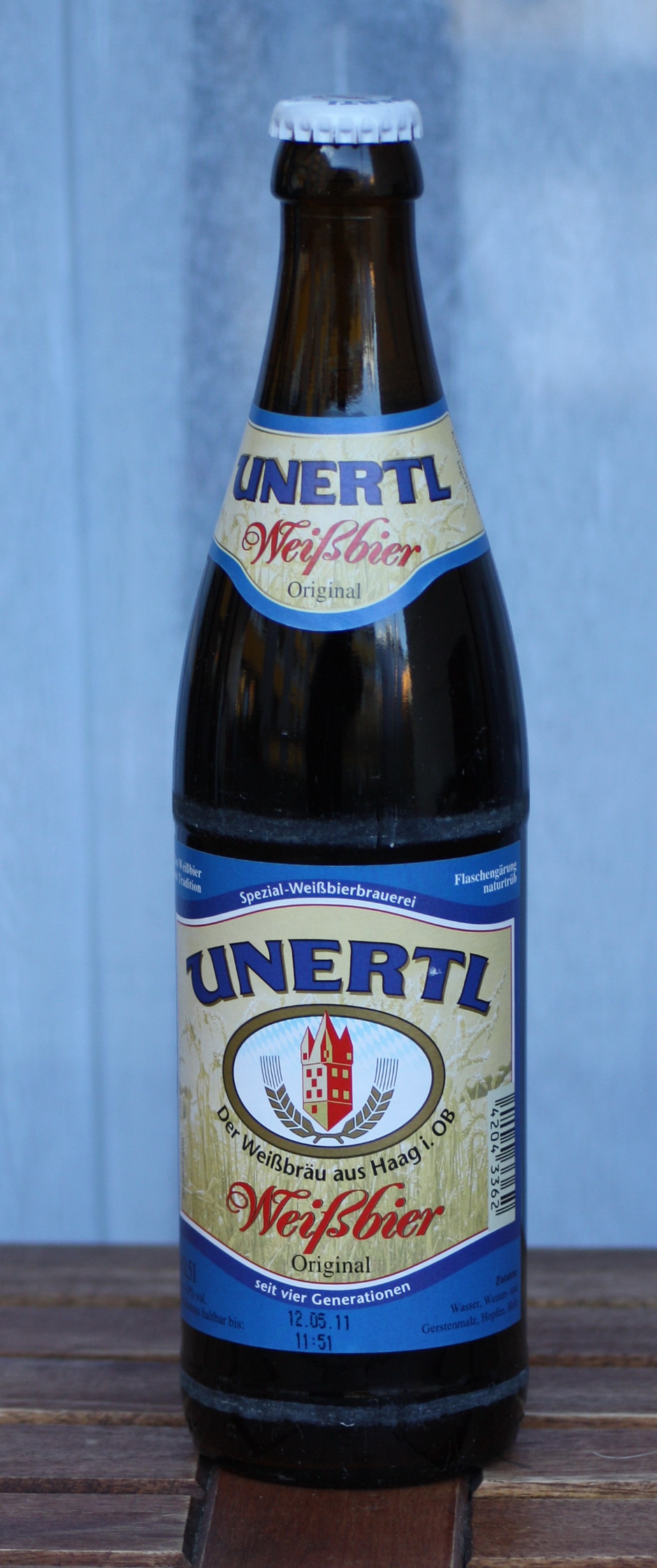
Unertl weissbier from Haag
