= Marek Krejčí =

Slovak footballer

Personal information
- Date of birth: 20 November 1980
- Place of birth: Bratislava, Czechoslovakia (now Slovakia)
- Date of death: 26 May 2007 (aged 26)
- Place of death: near Maitenbeth, Bavaria, Germany
- Height: 1.86 m (6 ft 1 in)
- Position: Striker

Senior career*
Years	Team	Apps	(Gls)
1998–2000	Inter Bratislava	45	(6)
2000–2001	Spartak Trnava	16	(2)
2001–2003	Győri ETO	3	(0)
2003–2004	Artmedia Bratislava	34	(15)
2004–2005	→ Wacker Burghausen (loan)	27	(5)
2005–2007	Wacker Burghausen	60	(21)
Total		185	(49)

International career
2004–2007	Slovakia	1	(0)
- * Club domestic league appearances and goals

Marek Krejčí (20 November 1980 – 26 May 2007) was a Slovak footballer who played as a striker.

== Career ==
Born in Bratislava, he started his career with local club Inter Bratislava, moving to Spartak Trnava in November 2000. He went on to move to Hungarian side Győri ETO in September 2001, eventually returning to Slovakia in the summer of 2003, when he signed a contract with one of the country's top clubs Artmedia Bratislava. He only spent one season with the team, winning the Slovak Cup in 2004 and making two UEFA Cup appearances in the autumn of 2003, scoring two goals. He was also the second best goalscorer of the Slovak League for the 2003–04 season, scoring 15 goals. On 31 March 2004, he played his first and only game for the Slovak national team, playing the first half of their friendly match against Austria which ended in a 1–1 draw.

In the summer of 2004, he joined German 2. Bundesliga side Wacker Burghausen on a one-season loan from Artmedia Bratislava, but the deal was made permanent upon the end of the 2004–05 season. He made his debut for the club on 3 October 2004 in a 4–2 win over 1860 München in which he also scored one goal. In three seasons of playing for Wacker Burghausen, he made 87 appearances and scored 26 goals in the 2nd Bundesliga. He had a contract until 2008 with the club and was thinking of staying with them for another season despite their relegation to the third division in 2007. Towards the end of the 2005–06 season, he was rumoured with a move to the Bundesliga after scoring 14 goals in the 2. Bundesliga and sharing the position of the league's second best goalscorer with Karlsruhe's Giovanni Federico.

== Death ==
He died in a road accident near Maitenbeth in Bavaria in the early morning of 26 May 2007, around 5:40 CEST. He was driving his Audi S3 on the road B12 in direction Mühldorf, being on his way back to Burghausen from Munich, when he lost control over the car in a left turn. The car subsequently swung off the road and continued to spin for about 50 metres before its roof hit a tree in the adjacent forest. Krejčí was left trapped inside the vehicle and the fire brigade were unable to save him. No other cars were involved in the accident, but the road was closed for about three hours. Probable cause of the accident was suspected to have been excessive speeding. He left behind his wife and 10-year-old daughter. On 29 May 2007, Wacker Burghausen decided to retire his shirt number 11.
