= Taufkirchen =

Taufkirchen is the name of several places:

== Germany (Bavaria) ==
- Taufkirchen (Munich), a small municipality south of Munich, near Oberhaching and Unterhaching in southern Germany
- Taufkirchen (Vils), a municipality in the district of Erding in Bavaria in Germany
- Taufkirchen (Mühldorf), a municipality in the district of Mühldorf in Bavaria in Germany

== Austria ==
- Taufkirchen an der Pram
- Taufkirchen an der Trattnach
