= Kraiburg =

- Municipality
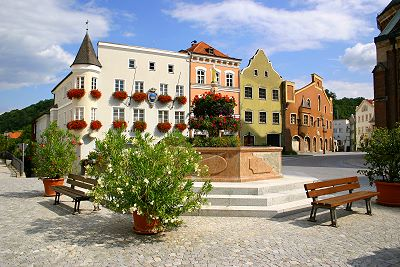
- Market square in Kraiburg

- Coat of arms

- Location of Kraiburg within Mühldorf am Inn district
- Interactive map of Kraiburg
- Location within Germany Location within Bavaria
- Coordinates: 48°11′N 12°26′E
- Country: Germany
- State: Bavaria
- Admin. region: Oberbayern
- District: Mühldorf am Inn
- Municipal assoc.: Kraiburg am Inn

Government
  - Mayor (2020–26): Petra Jackl (CSU)

Area
  - Total: 27.56 km^{2} (10.64 sq mi)
- Elevation: 462 m (1,516 ft)

Population (2025-12-31)
  - Total: 4,001
  - Density: 145.2/km^{2} (376.0/sq mi)
- Time zone: UTC+01:00 (CET)
  - Summer (DST): UTC+02:00 (CEST)
- Postal codes: 84559
- Dialling codes: 08638
- Vehicle registration: MÜ
- Website: www.markt-kraiburg.de

Kraiburg is a municipality in the district of Mühldorf in Bavaria in Germany. It lies on the river Inn.
