= Obertaufkirchen =

- Municipality
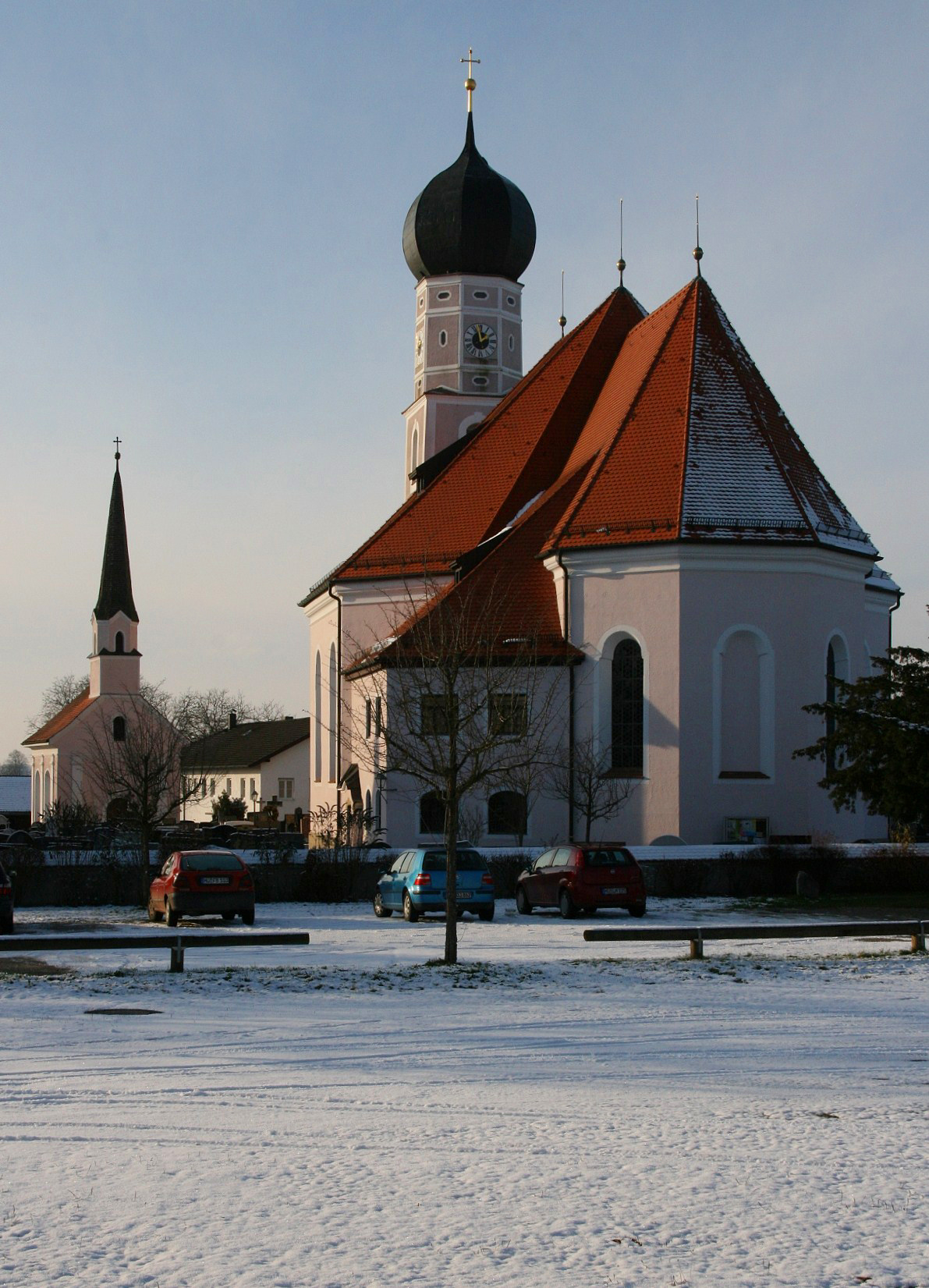
- Church of Saints Magdalene and Martin

- Coat of arms

- Location of Obertaufkirchen within Mühldorf am Inn district
- Interactive map of Obertaufkirchen
- Location within Germany Location within Bavaria
- Coordinates: 48°16′N 12°17′E
- Country: Germany
- State: Bavaria
- Admin. region: Oberbayern
- District: Mühldorf am Inn

Government
  - Mayor (2020–26): Franz Ehgartner

Area
  - Total: 31.64 km^{2} (12.22 sq mi)
- Elevation: 457 m (1,499 ft)

Population (2025-12-31)
  - Total: 2,733
  - Density: 86.38/km^{2} (223.7/sq mi)
- Time zone: UTC+01:00 (CET)
  - Summer (DST): UTC+02:00 (CEST)
- Postal codes: 84419
- Dialling codes: 08082
- Vehicle registration: MÜ
- Website: www.obertaufkirchen.de

Obertaufkirchen is a municipality in the district of Mühldorf in Bavaria in Germany.
