= Unterreit =

- Municipality
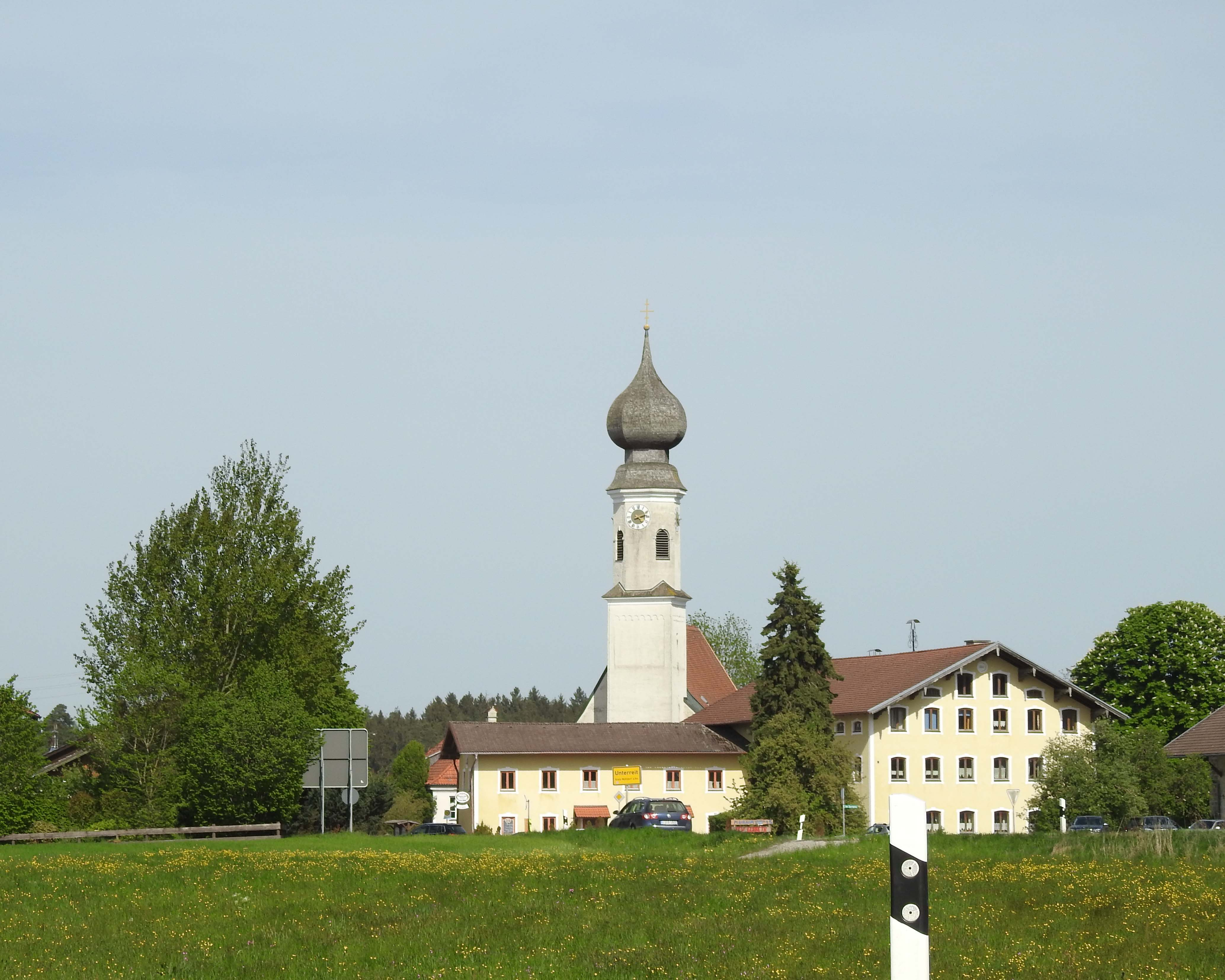
- Unterreit seen from the west

- Coat of arms

- Location of Unterreit within Mühldorf am Inn district
- Interactive map of Unterreit
- Location within Germany Location within Bavaria
- Coordinates: 48°7′N 12°20′E
- Country: Germany
- State: Bavaria
- Admin. region: Oberbayern
- District: Mühldorf am Inn
- Municipal assoc.: Gars am Inn

Government
  - Mayor (2020–26): Christian Seidl (FW)

Area
  - Total: 32.20 km^{2} (12.43 sq mi)
- Elevation: 478–560 m (1,568–1,837 ft)

Population (2025-12-31)
  - Total: 1,754
  - Density: 54.47/km^{2} (141.1/sq mi)
- Time zone: UTC+01:00 (CET)
  - Summer (DST): UTC+02:00 (CEST)
- Postal codes: 83567
- Dialling codes: 08073
- Vehicle registration: MÜ
- Website: www.unterreit.de

Unterreit is a municipality in the district of Mühldorf in Bavaria in Germany.
