= Rechtmehring =

- Municipality
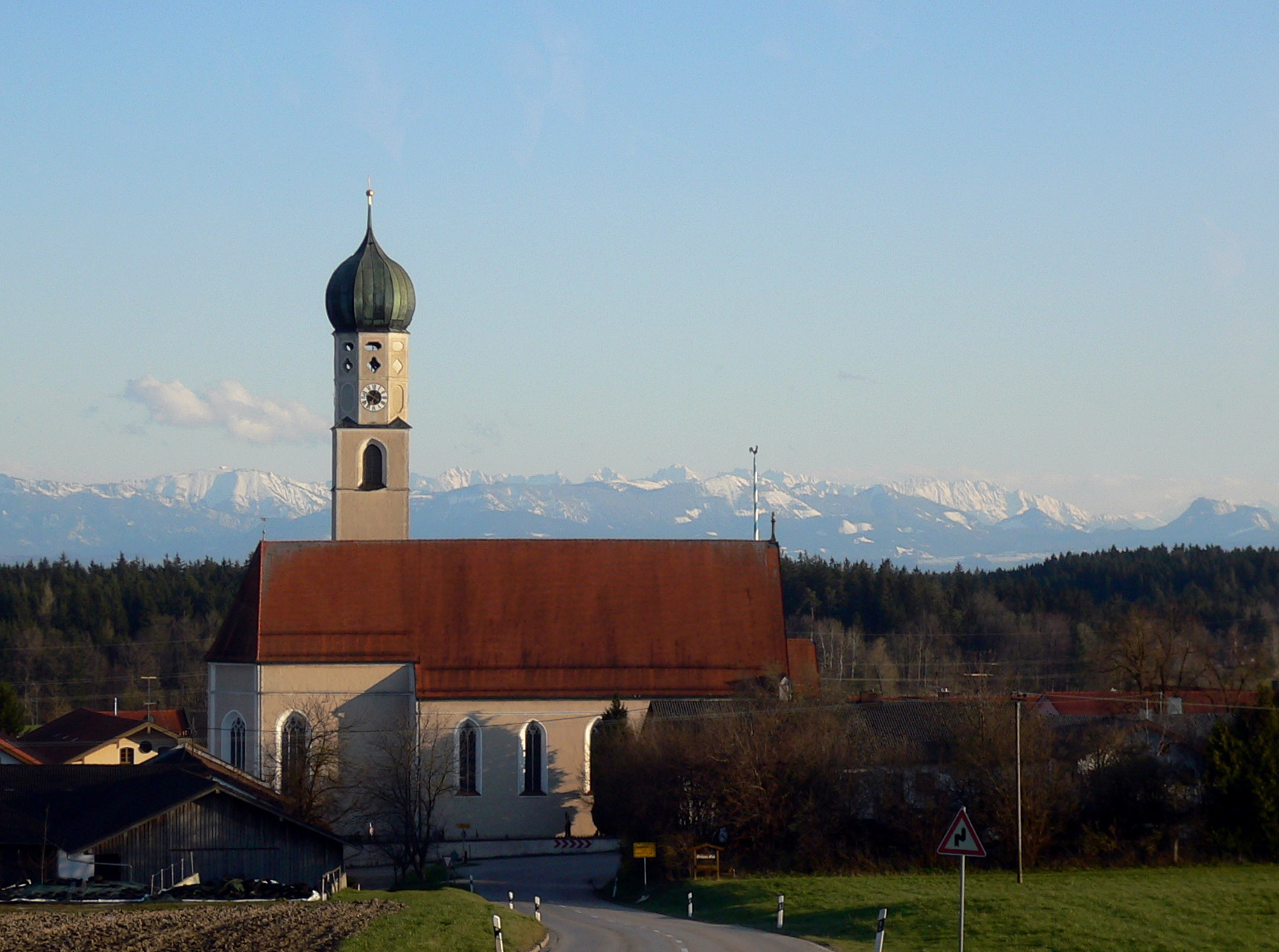
- Church of Saint Korbinian

- Coat of arms

- Location of Rechtmehring within Mühldorf am Inn district
- Interactive map of Rechtmehring
- Location within Germany Location within Bavaria
- Coordinates: 48°07′N 12°10′E
- Country: Germany
- State: Bavaria
- Admin. region: Oberbayern
- District: Mühldorf am Inn
- Municipal assoc.: Maitenbeth
- Subdivisions: 59 Ortsteile

Government
  - Mayor (2020–26): Sebastian Linner

Area
  - Total: 24.33 km^{2} (9.39 sq mi)
- Elevation: 505 m (1,657 ft)

Population (2025-12-31)
  - Total: 2,107
  - Density: 86.60/km^{2} (224.3/sq mi)
- Time zone: UTC+01:00 (CET)
  - Summer (DST): UTC+02:00 (CEST)
- Postal codes: 83562
- Dialling codes: 08076
- Vehicle registration: MÜ
- Website: www.rechtmehring.de

Rechtmehring is a municipality in the district of Mühldorf in Bavaria in Germany.
