= Kirchdorf, Upper Bavaria =

Kirchdorf
- Municipality
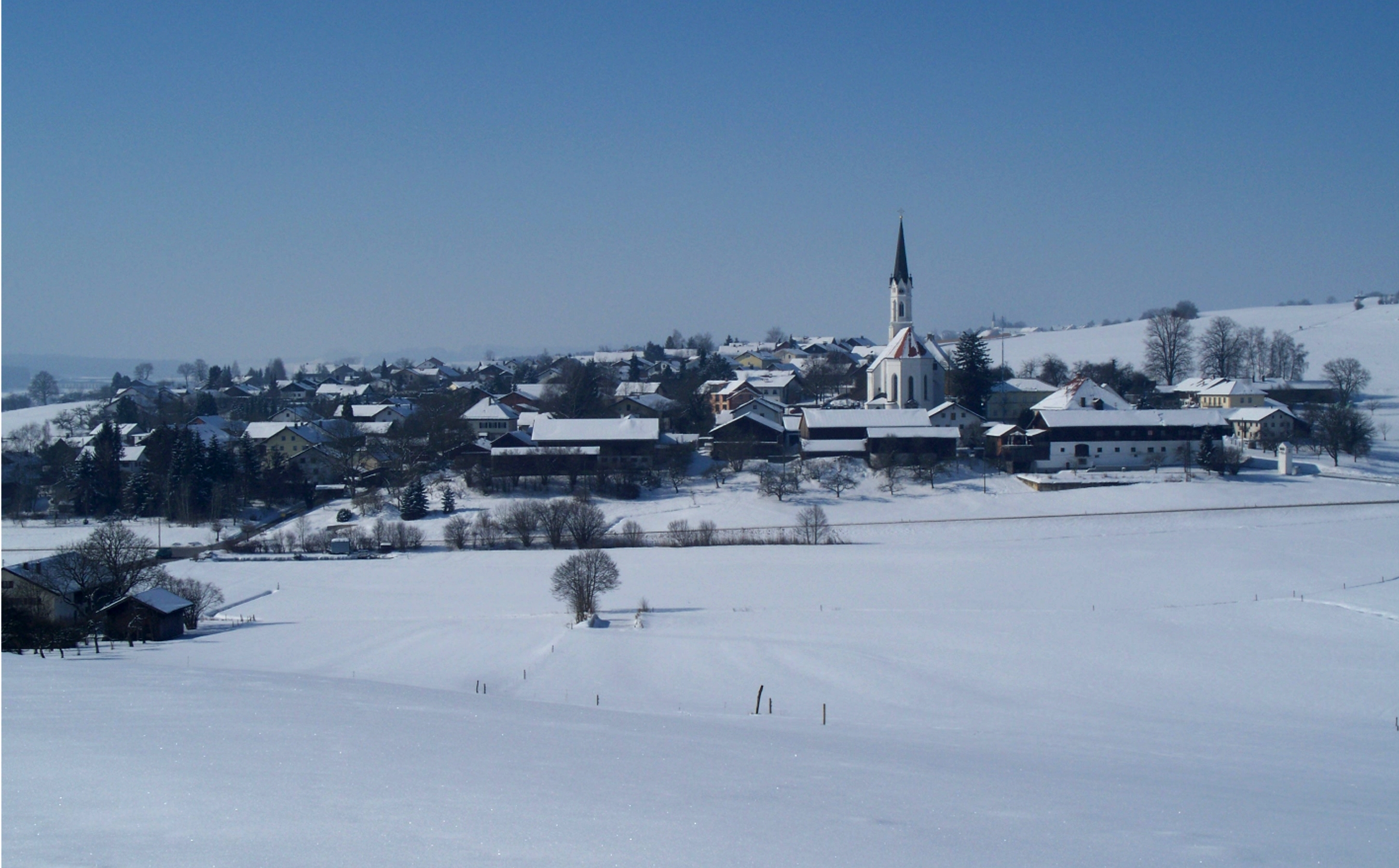
- Kirchdorf in winter

- Coat of arms

- Location of Kirchdorf within Mühldorf am Inn district
- Interactive map of Kirchdorf
- Location within Germany Location within Bavaria
- Coordinates: 48°11′N 12°12′E
- Country: Germany
- State: Bavaria
- Admin. region: Oberbayern
- District: Mühldorf am Inn
- Municipal assoc.: Reichertsheim

Government
  - Mayor (2020–26): Christoph Greißl (FW)

Area
  - Total: 21.03 km^{2} (8.12 sq mi)
- Elevation: 551 m (1,808 ft)

Population (2025-12-31)
  - Total: 1,338
  - Density: 63.62/km^{2} (164.8/sq mi)
- Time zone: UTC+01:00 (CET)
  - Summer (DST): UTC+02:00 (CEST)
- Postal codes: 83527
- Dialling codes: 08072
- Vehicle registration: MÜ
- Website: www.kirchdorf-online.de

Kirchdorf (German pronunciation: [ˈkɪʁçdɔʁf]) is a municipality in the district of Mühldorf in Bavaria in Germany.
