= Egglkofen =

- Municipality
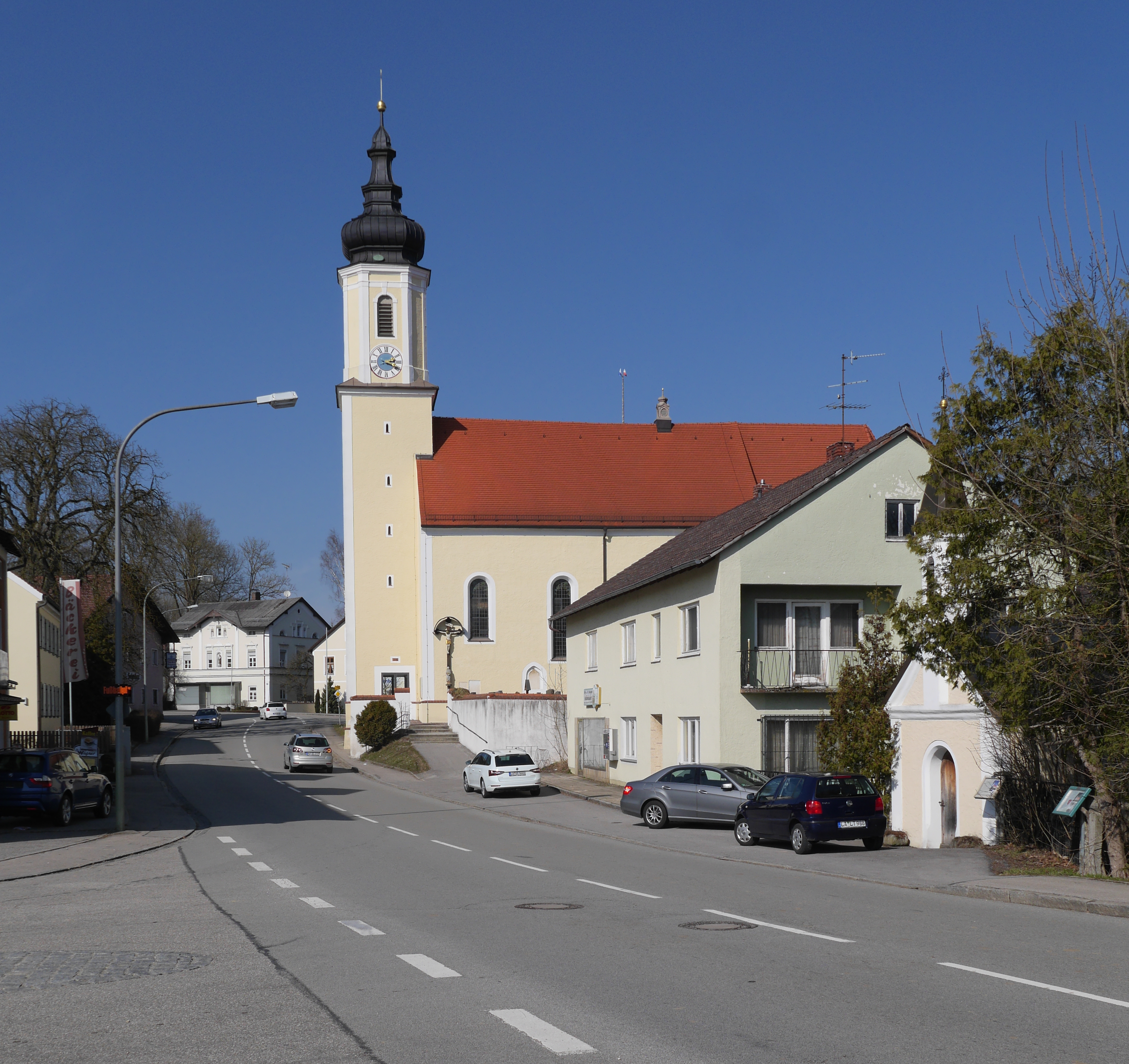
- Church of the Assumption of the Virgin Mary

- Coat of arms

- Location of Egglkofen within Mühldorf am Inn district
- Interactive map of Egglkofen
- Location within Germany Location within Bavaria
- Coordinates: 48°24′N 12°27′E
- Country: Germany
- State: Bavaria
- Admin. region: Oberbayern
- District: Mühldorf am Inn
- Municipal assoc.: Neumarkt-Sankt Veit

Government
  - Mayor (2020–26): Johann Ziegleder

Area
  - Total: 13.99 km^{2} (5.40 sq mi)
- Elevation: 447 m (1,467 ft)

Population (2025-12-31)
  - Total: 1,375
  - Density: 98.28/km^{2} (254.6/sq mi)
- Time zone: UTC+01:00 (CET)
  - Summer (DST): UTC+02:00 (CEST)
- Postal codes: 84546
- Dialling codes: 08639
- Vehicle registration: MÜ
- Website: www.egglkofen.de

Egglkofen is a municipality in the district of Mühldorf in Bavaria in Germany.
