= Oberneukirchen =

- Municipality
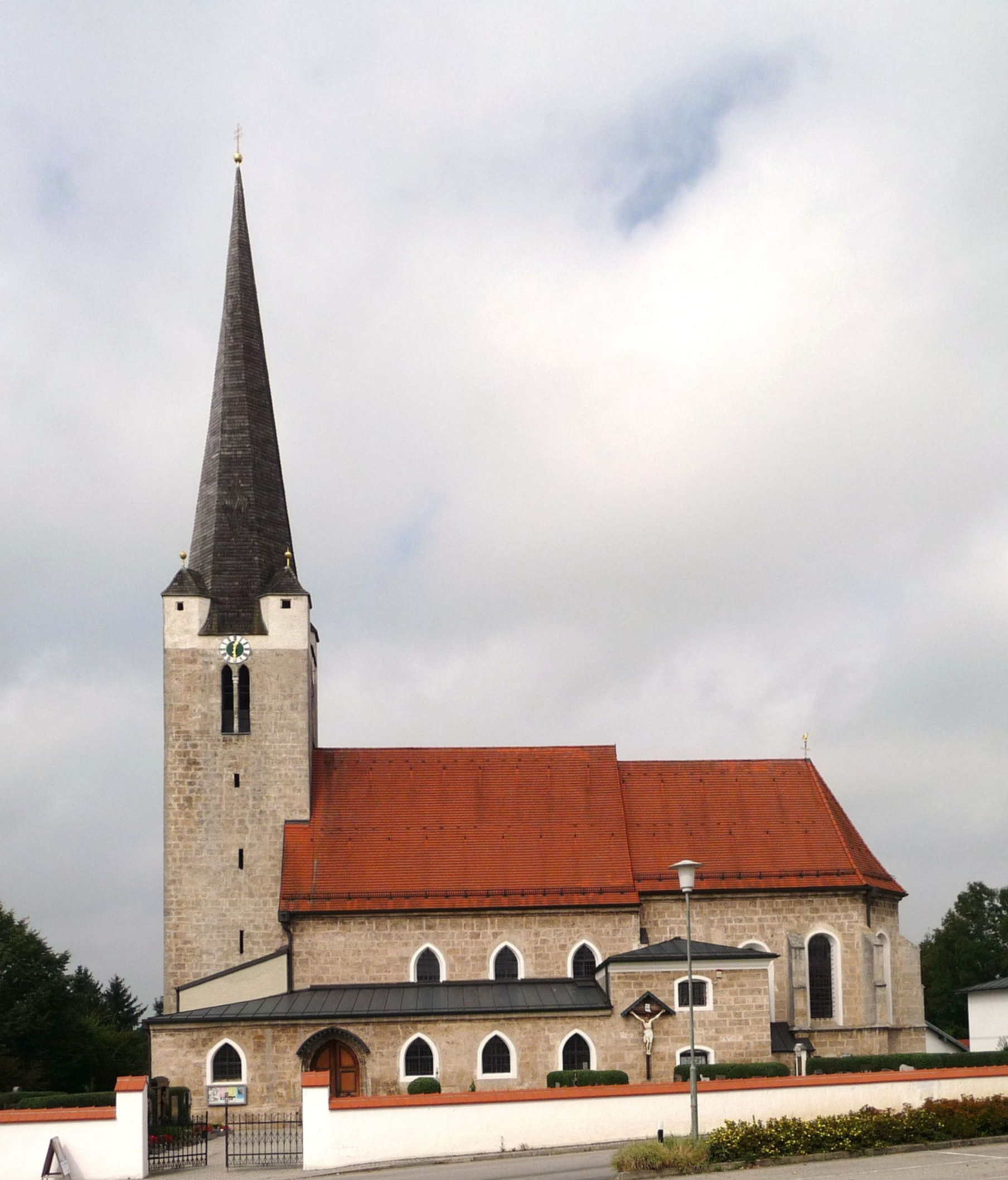
- Church of Saint Margaret

- Coat of arms

- Location of Oberneukirchen within Mühldorf am Inn district
- Interactive map of Oberneukirchen
- Location within Germany Location within Bavaria
- Coordinates: 48°11′N 12°31′E
- Country: Germany
- State: Bavaria
- Admin. region: Oberbayern
- District: Mühldorf am Inn
- Municipal assoc.: Polling

Government
  - Mayor (2020–26): Anna Meier (FW)

Area
  - Total: 19.59 km^{2} (7.56 sq mi)
- Elevation: 461 m (1,512 ft)

Population (2025-12-31)
  - Total: 829
  - Density: 42.3/km^{2} (110/sq mi)
- Time zone: UTC+01:00 (CET)
  - Summer (DST): UTC+02:00 (CEST)
- Postal codes: 84565
- Dialling codes: 08630
- Vehicle registration: MÜ
- Website: www.oberneukirchen.de

Oberneukirchen is a municipality in the district of Mühldorf in Bavaria in Germany.
