= Neumarkt-Sankt Veit =

- Town
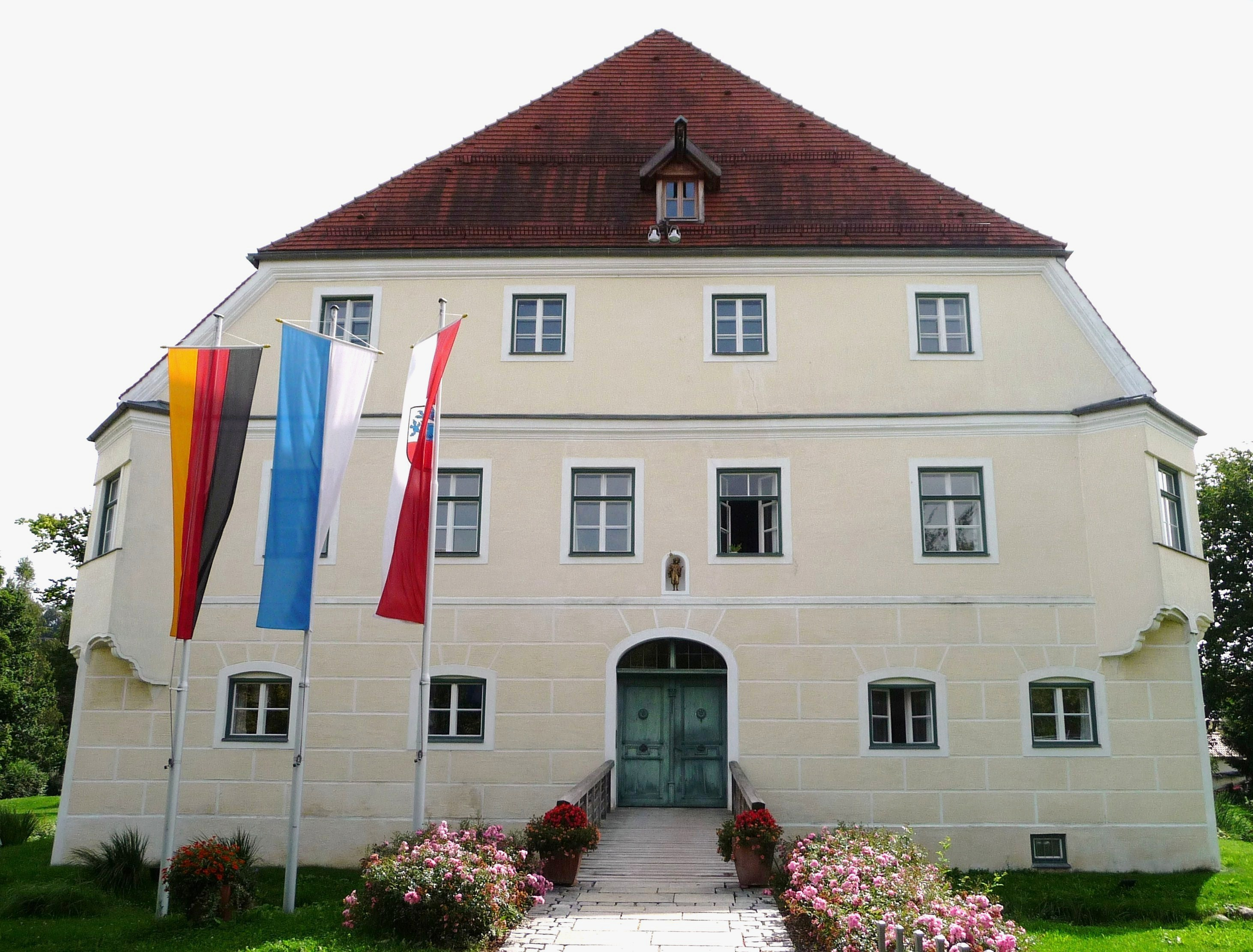
- Town hall

- Coat of arms

- Location of Neumarkt-Sankt Veit within Mühldorf am Inn district
- Interactive map of Neumarkt-Sankt Veit
- Location within Germany Location within Bavaria
- Coordinates: 48°22′N 12°30′E
- Country: Germany
- State: Bavaria
- Admin. region: Oberbayern
- District: Mühldorf am Inn
- Municipal assoc.: Neumarkt-Sankt Veit

Government
  - Mayor (2020–26): Erwin Baumgartner

Area
  - Total: 61.07 km^{2} (23.58 sq mi)
- Elevation: 457 m (1,499 ft)

Population (2025-12-31)
  - Total: 6,408
  - Density: 104.9/km^{2} (271.8/sq mi)
- Time zone: UTC+01:00 (CET)
  - Summer (DST): UTC+02:00 (CEST)
- Postal codes: 84494 8267
- Dialling codes: 08639
- Vehicle registration: MÜ
- Website: www.neumarkt-sankt-veit.de

Neumarkt-Sankt Veit (German pronunciation: [ˈnɔʏmaʁkt zaŋkt ˈfaɪt]; until 1934 Neumarkt an der Rott) is a town in the district of Mühldorf, in Bavaria, Germany. It is located on the river Rott, 10 kilometers north of Mühldorf, and 33 kilometers southeast of Landshut.

== Mayor ==
Erwin Baumgartner (UWG) has been the mayor since 2002; he was reelected in 2008, 2014 and 2020.

== Twin towns ==
Neumarkt-Sankt Veit is twinned with:

- Caneva, Italy, since 2002

== Notable people from Neumarkt-Sankt Veit ==
- August Hauner (1811-1884), pediatrician and university lecturer, founder of the Hauner Children Hospital in Munich
- Franz Ackermann (born 1963), artist
