= Polling (Verwaltungsgemeinschaft) =

- Verwaltungsgemeinschaft
- Location of Polling within Mühldorf district
- Interactive map of Polling
- Location within Germany Location within Bavaria
- Coordinates: 48°13′N 12°34′E
- Country: Germany
- State: Bavaria
- Admin. region: Upper Bavaria
- District: Mühldorf
- Seat: Polling
- Subdivisions: 2 municipalities

Area
  - Total: 63.45 km^{2} (24.50 sq mi)

Population (2025-12-31)
  - Total: 4,153
  - Density: 65.45/km^{2} (169.5/sq mi)
- Time zone: UTC+01:00 (CET)
  - Summer (DST): UTC+02:00 (CEST)
- Website: www.gemeinde-polling.de

Polling is a Verwaltungsgemeinschaft (municipal association) in the district of Mühldorf in Bavaria, Germany. Its seat is in Polling.

It consists of the following municipalities:

1. Oberneukirchen
2. Polling
