= August Hauner =

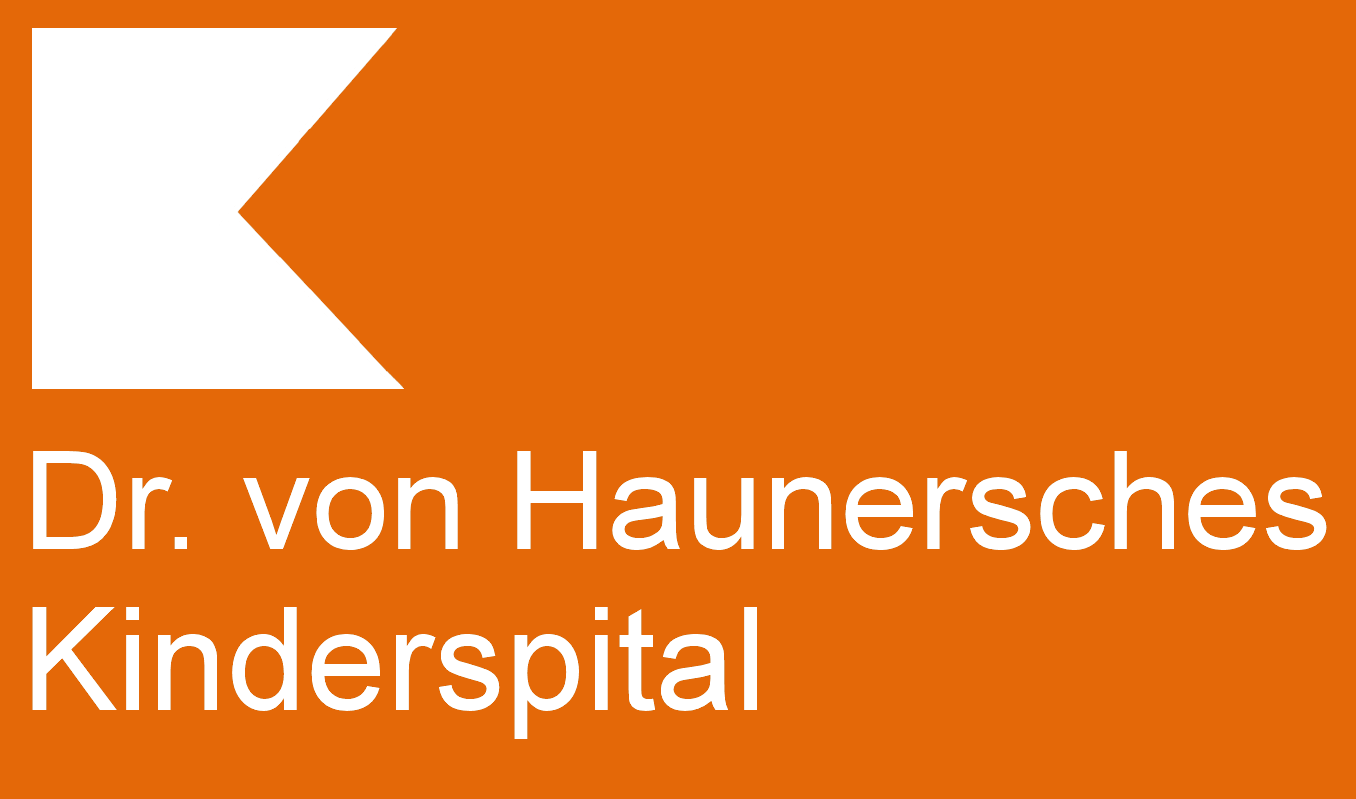
Logo of the Dr. von Haunerschen Kinderspitals

August Hauner (29 October 1811 – 11 June 1884) was a German pediatrician and founder of the Hauner Children's Hospital in Munich, which today is part of LMU Munich's hospital complex. He was born in Neumarkt-Sankt Veit.

He studied medicine at the Ludwig-Maximilians-Universität München (LMU) and the University of Vienna, and in 1837 relocated to Tann, Bavaria as a general practitioner. Later, he performed similar duties in Murnau am Staffelsee. In 1845, he moved to Munich, where he opened a small private hospital for treatment of underprivileged sick children. The original facility had six hospital beds with a busy out-patient clinic. Gradually, over the years, the hospital grew in size and stature.

In 1850, he obtained his habilitation at Munich, and began teaching clinical courses in pediatrics. In 1853, he was made an "honorary professor" with no entitlement to a salary. Then in 1882, a new hospital building was constructed on the Lindwurmstraße, two years prior to his death.

== Written works ==
Beginning in 1852, he was co-editor of Behrend's Journal für Kinderkrankheiten, a journal in which he published extensively on his experiences in pediatrics. He was the author of the following works in pediatrics:

- Beiträge zur Paediatrik (1863); (Contributions to pediatrics).
- Grundzüge der physischen Erziehung der Kinder (1868); (Principles of physical education for children).
