= Niederbergkirchen =

- Municipality
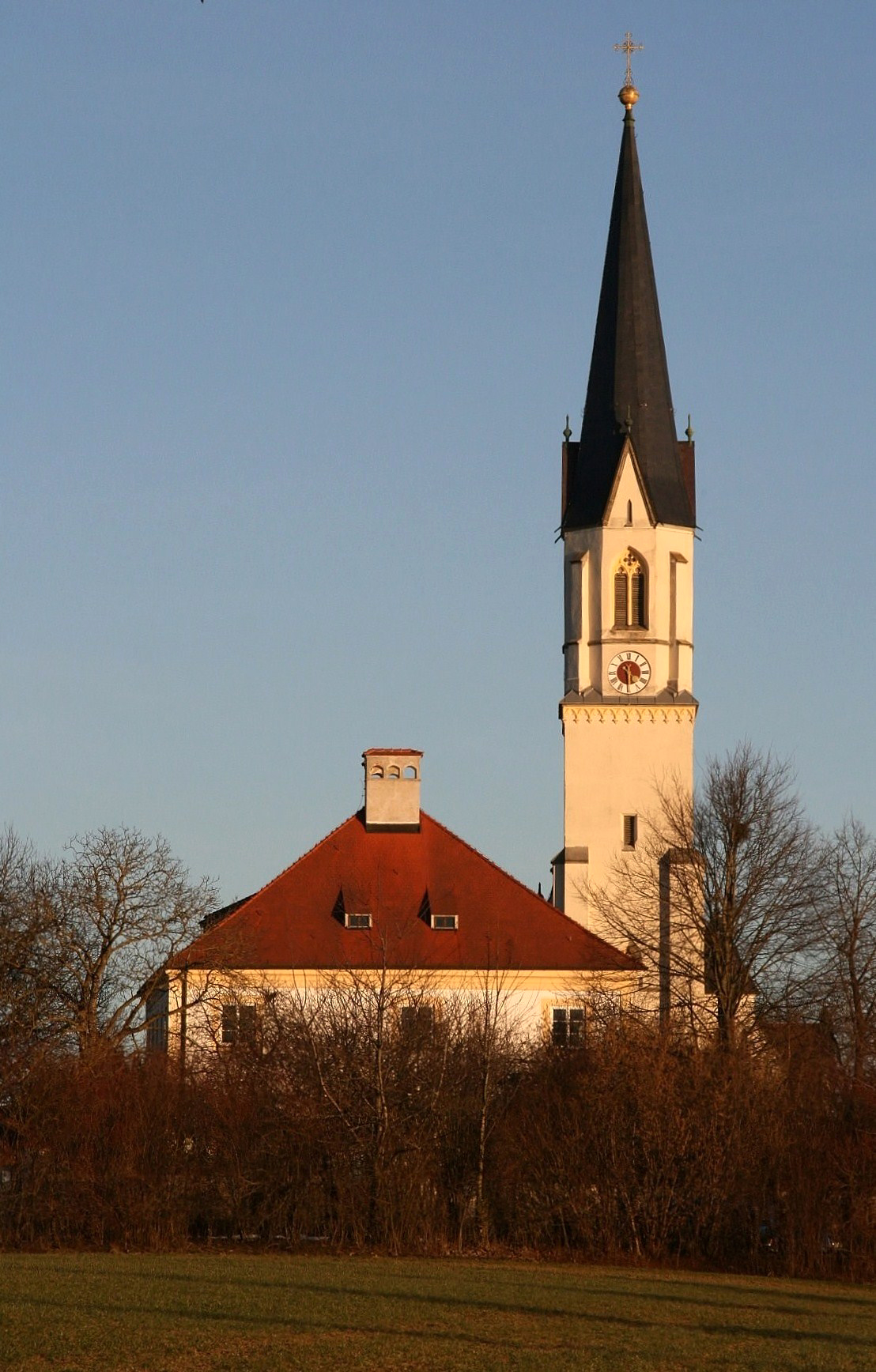
- Saint Blaise Church and the rectory

- Coat of arms

- Location of Niederbergkirchen within Mühldorf am Inn district
- Interactive map of Niederbergkirchen
- Location within Germany Location within Bavaria
- Coordinates: 48°32′N 12°30′E
- Country: Germany
- State: Bavaria
- Admin. region: Oberbayern
- District: Mühldorf am Inn
- Municipal assoc.: Rohrbach

Government
  - Mayor (2020–26): Werner Biedermann (CSU)

Area
  - Total: 24.70 km^{2} (9.54 sq mi)
- Elevation: 489 m (1,604 ft)

Population (2025-12-31)
  - Total: 1,217
  - Density: 49.27/km^{2} (127.6/sq mi)
- Time zone: UTC+01:00 (CET)
  - Summer (DST): UTC+02:00 (CEST)
- Postal codes: 84494
- Dialling codes: 08639, 08635
- Vehicle registration: MÜ
- Website: www.niederbergkirchen.de

Niederbergkirchen is a municipality in the district of Mühldorf in Bavaria in Germany.
