= Heldenstein =

- Municipality
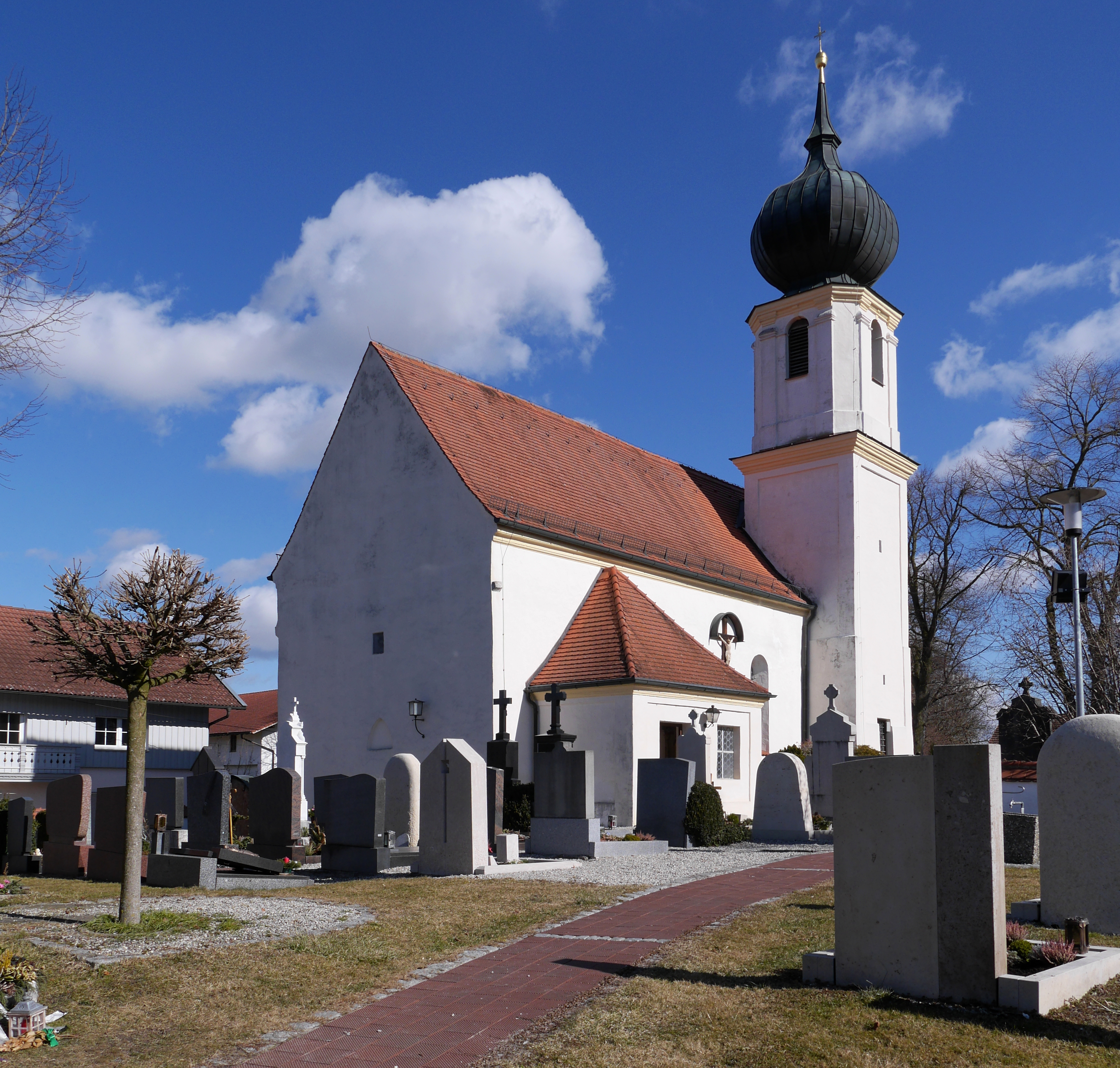
- Church of Saint Peter in Weidenbach

- Coat of arms

- Location of Heldenstein within Mühldorf am Inn district
- Interactive map of Heldenstein
- Location within Germany Location within Bavaria
- Coordinates: 48°15′N 12°22′E
- Country: Germany
- State: Bavaria
- Admin. region: Oberbayern
- District: Mühldorf am Inn
- Municipal assoc.: Heldenstein

Government
  - Mayor (2020–26): Antonia Hansmeier (CSU)

Area
  - Total: 19.85 km^{2} (7.66 sq mi)
- Elevation: 450 m (1,480 ft)

Population (2025-12-31)
  - Total: 2,813
  - Density: 141.7/km^{2} (367.0/sq mi)
- Time zone: UTC+01:00 (CET)
  - Summer (DST): UTC+02:00 (CEST)
- Postal codes: 84431
- Dialling codes: 08636
- Vehicle registration: MÜ
- Website: www.heldenstein.de

Heldenstein is a municipality in the district of Mühldorf in Bavaria in Germany.
