= Aschau am Inn =

- Municipality
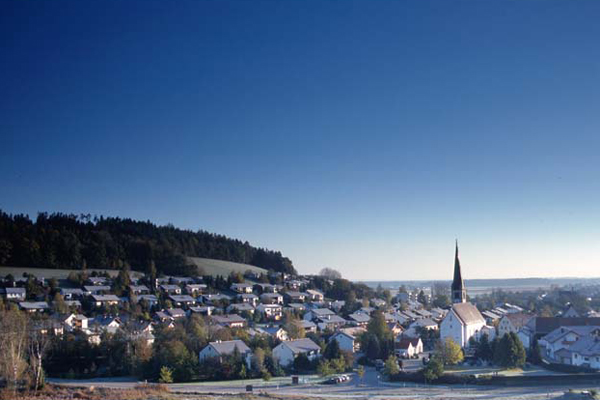
- Aschau in winter

- Coat of arms

- Location of Aschau am Inn within Mühldorf am Inn district
- Interactive map of Aschau am Inn
- Location within Germany Location within Bavaria
- Coordinates: 48°12′N 12°21′E
- Country: Germany
- State: Bavaria
- Admin. region: Oberbayern
- District: Mühldorf am Inn

Government
  - Mayor (2020–26): Christian Weyrich

Area
  - Total: 20.76 km^{2} (8.02 sq mi)
- Elevation: 457 m (1,499 ft)

Population (2025-12-31)
  - Total: 3,274
  - Density: 157.7/km^{2} (408.5/sq mi)
- Time zone: UTC+01:00 (CET)
  - Summer (DST): UTC+02:00 (CEST)
- Postal codes: 84544
- Dialling codes: 08638
- Vehicle registration: MÜ
- Website: www.aschau-a-inn.de

Aschau am Inn (German pronunciation: [ˈaʃaʊ ʔam ˈʔɪn], lit. 'Aschau on the Inn') is a municipality in the district of Mühldorf in Bavaria in Germany with about 3400 inhabitants (2020).

== Notable people ==
- Johannes Muschol (1949–1981); a member of the GDR border troops shot the German citizen as he jumped over the Berlin Wall into the death strip.
- Joseph Ratzinger (1927-2022), Pope Benedict XVI, spent his elementary school years from 1932 to 1937 in Aschau am Inn.
