= Gars am Inn (Verwaltungsgemeinschaft) =

- Verwaltungsgemeinschaft
- Location of Gars am Inn within Mühldorf district
- Interactive map of Gars am Inn
- Location within Germany Location within Bavaria
- Coordinates: 48°09′N 12°17′E
- Country: Germany
- State: Bavaria
- Admin. region: Upper Bavaria
- District: Mühldorf
- Seat: Gars am Inn
- Subdivisions: 2 municipalities

Area
  - Total: 75.86 km^{2} (29.29 sq mi)

Population (2025-12-31)
  - Total: 5,780
  - Density: 76.2/km^{2} (197/sq mi)
- Time zone: UTC+01:00 (CET)
  - Summer (DST): UTC+02:00 (CEST)
- Website: www.gars.de

Gars am Inn is a Verwaltungsgemeinschaft (municipal association) in the district of Mühldorf in Bavaria, Germany. Its seat is in Gars am Inn.

It consists of the following municipalities:

1. Gars am Inn
2. Unterreit
