= Niedertaufkirchen =

- Municipality
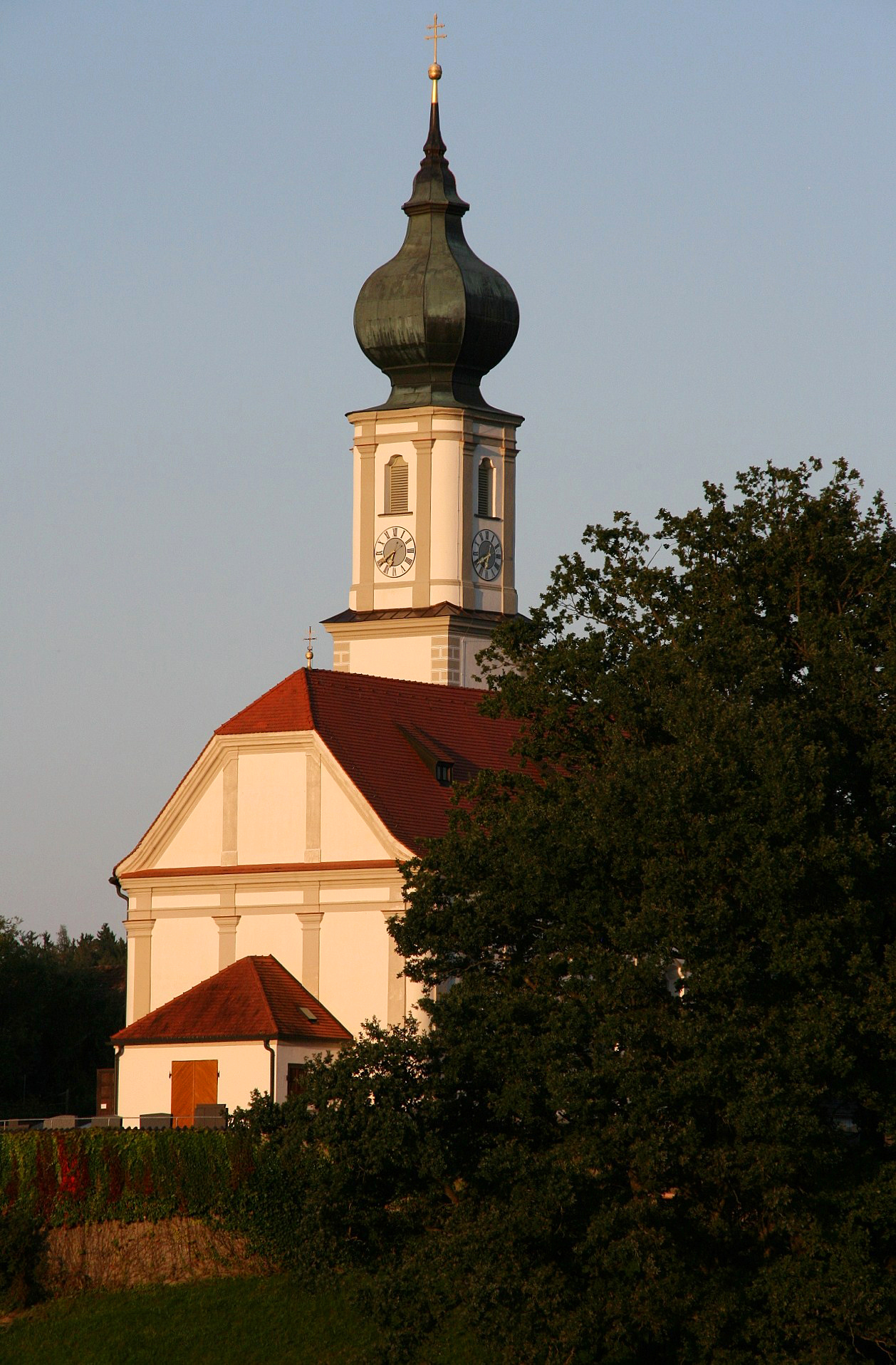
- Saint Martin Church

- Coat of arms

- Location of Niedertaufkirchen within Mühldorf am Inn district
- Interactive map of Niedertaufkirchen
- Location within Germany Location within Bavaria
- Coordinates: 48°20′N 12°33′E
- Country: Germany
- State: Bavaria
- Admin. region: Oberbayern
- District: Mühldorf am Inn
- Municipal assoc.: Rohrbach

Government
  - Mayor (2020–26): Sebastian Winkler (FW)

Area
  - Total: 26.69 km^{2} (10.31 sq mi)
- Elevation: 442 m (1,450 ft)

Population (2025-12-31)
  - Total: 1,431
  - Density: 53.62/km^{2} (138.9/sq mi)
- Time zone: UTC+01:00 (CET)
  - Summer (DST): UTC+02:00 (CEST)
- Postal codes: 84494
- Dialling codes: 08639
- Vehicle registration: MÜ
- Website: www.Niedertaufkirchen.de

Niedertaufkirchen is a municipality in the district of Mühldorf in Bavaria in Germany.
