= Erharting =

- Municipality
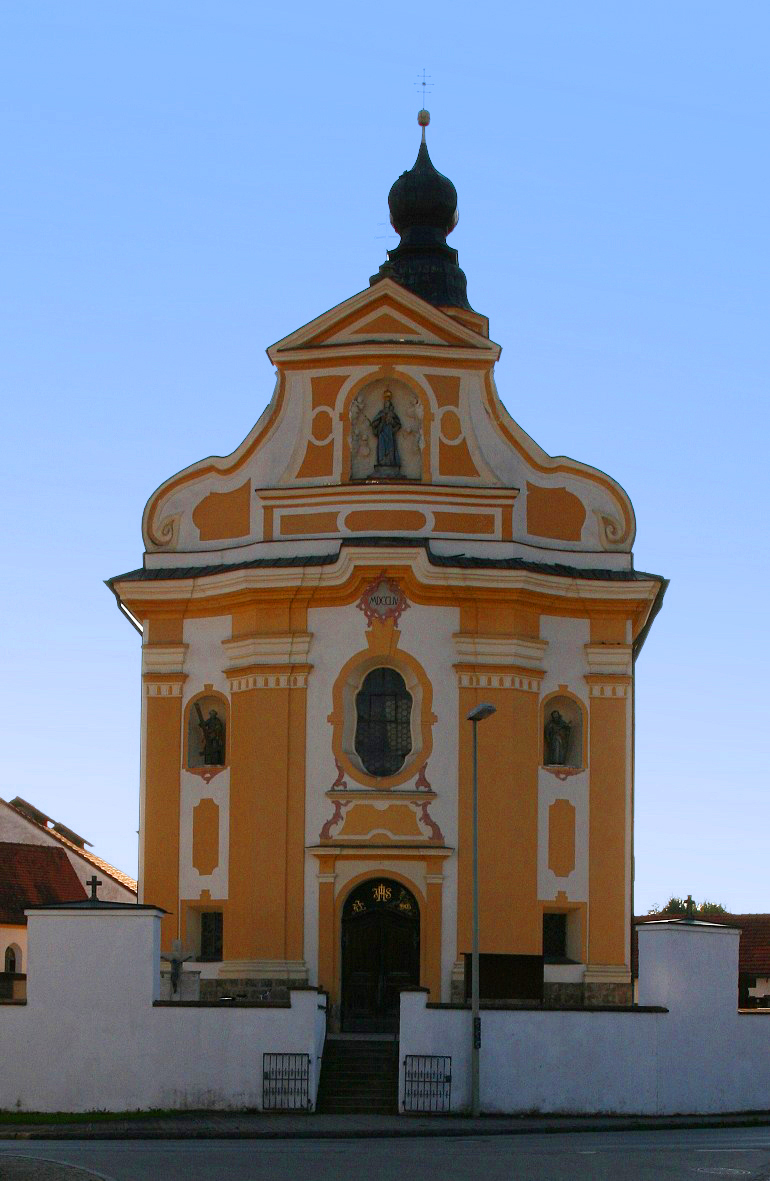
- Church of Saints Peter and Paul

- Coat of arms

- Location of Erharting within Mühldorf am Inn district
- Interactive map of Erharting
- Location within Germany Location within Bavaria
- Coordinates: 48°17′N 12°35′E
- Country: Germany
- State: Bavaria
- Admin. region: Oberbayern
- District: Mühldorf am Inn
- Municipal assoc.: Rohrbach

Government
  - Mayor (2020–26): Matthias Huber

Area
  - Total: 13.69 km^{2} (5.29 sq mi)
- Elevation: 390–470 m (1,280–1,540 ft)

Population (2025-12-31)
  - Total: 1,005
  - Density: 73.41/km^{2} (190.1/sq mi)
- Time zone: UTC+01:00 (CET)
  - Summer (DST): UTC+02:00 (CEST)
- Postal codes: 84513
- Dialling codes: 08631, 08635
- Vehicle registration: MÜ
- Website: www.erharting.de

Erharting is a municipality in the district of Mühldorf in Bavaria in Germany.
