= Reichertsheim (Verwaltungsgemeinschaft) =

- Verwaltungsgemeinschaft
- Location of Reichertsheim within Mühldorf district
- Interactive map of Reichertsheim
- Location within Germany Location within Bavaria
- Coordinates: 48°12′N 12°17′E
- Country: Germany
- State: Bavaria
- Admin. region: Upper Bavaria
- District: Mühldorf
- Seat: Reichertsheim
- Subdivisions: 2 municipalities

Area
  - Total: 52.39 km^{2} (20.23 sq mi)

Population (2025-12-31)
  - Total: 3,067
  - Density: 58.54/km^{2} (151.6/sq mi)
- Time zone: UTC+01:00 (CET)
  - Summer (DST): UTC+02:00 (CEST)

Reichertsheim is a Verwaltungsgemeinschaft (municipal association) in the district of Mühldorf in Bavaria, Germany. Its seat is in Reichertsheim.

It consists of the following municipalities:

1. Kirchdorf
2. Reichertsheim
