= Kraiburg am Inn (Verwaltungsgemeinschaft) =

- Verwaltungsgemeinschaft
- Location of Kraiburg am Inn within Mühldorf district
- Interactive map of Kraiburg am Inn
- Location within Germany Location within Bavaria
- Coordinates: 48°11′N 12°26′E
- Country: Germany
- State: Bavaria
- Admin. region: Upper Bavaria
- District: Mühldorf
- Seat: Kraiburg
- Subdivisions: 3 municipalities

Area
  - Total: 62.06 km^{2} (23.96 sq mi)

Population (2025-12-31)
  - Total: 6,172
  - Density: 99.45/km^{2} (257.6/sq mi)
- Time zone: UTC+01:00 (CET)
  - Summer (DST): UTC+02:00 (CEST)
- Website: www.vg-kraiburg.de

Kraiburg am Inn is a Verwaltungsgemeinschaft (municipal association) in the district of Mühldorf in Bavaria, Germany. Its seat is in Kraiburg.

It consists of the following municipalities:

1. Kraiburg
2. Jettenbach
3. Taufkirchen
