= Lohkirchen =

- Municipality
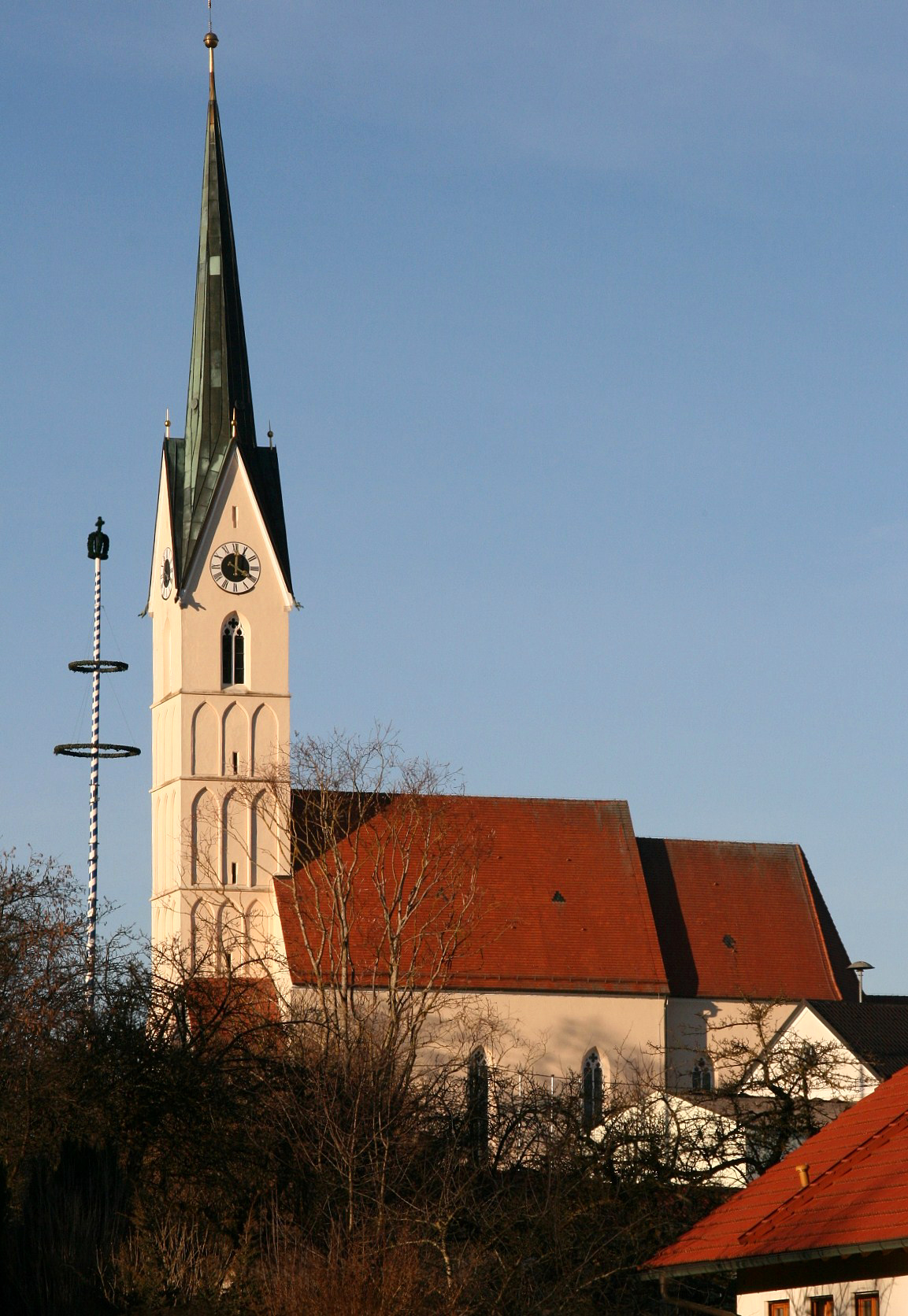
- Church of the Assumption of the Virgin Mary

- Coat of arms

- Location of Lohkirchen within Mühldorf am Inn district
- Interactive map of Lohkirchen
- Location within Germany Location within Bavaria
- Coordinates: 48°19′N 12°27′E
- Country: Germany
- State: Bavaria
- Admin. region: Oberbayern
- District: Mühldorf am Inn
- Municipal assoc.: Oberbergkirchen

Government
  - Mayor (2020–26): Siegfried Schick

Area
  - Total: 14.88 km^{2} (5.75 sq mi)
- Elevation: 490 m (1,610 ft)

Population (2025-12-31)
  - Total: 833
  - Density: 56.0/km^{2} (145/sq mi)
- Time zone: UTC+01:00 (CET)
  - Summer (DST): UTC+02:00 (CEST)
- Postal codes: 84494
- Dialling codes: 08637
- Vehicle registration: MÜ
- Website: www.lohkirchen.de

Lohkirchen is a municipality in the district of Mühldorf in Bavaria in Germany.
