= Maitenbeth (Verwaltungsgemeinschaft) =

- Verwaltungsgemeinschaft
- Location of Maitenbeth within Mühldorf district
- Interactive map of Maitenbeth
- Location within Germany Location within Bavaria
- Coordinates: 48°09′N 12°05′E
- Country: Germany
- State: Bavaria
- Admin. region: Upper Bavaria
- District: Mühldorf
- Seat: Maitenbeth
- Subdivisions: 2 municipalities

Area
  - Total: 55.33 km^{2} (21.36 sq mi)

Population (2025-12-31)
  - Total: 4,183
  - Density: 75.60/km^{2} (195.8/sq mi)
- Time zone: UTC+01:00 (CET)
  - Summer (DST): UTC+02:00 (CEST)
- Website: www.maitenbeth.de

Maitenbeth is a Verwaltungsgemeinschaft (municipal association) in the district of Mühldorf in Bavaria, Germany. Its seat is in Maitenbeth.

It consists of the following municipalities:

1. Maitenbeth
2. Rechtmehring
