= Zangberg =

Municipality in the district of Mühldorf in Bavaria in Germany

- Municipality
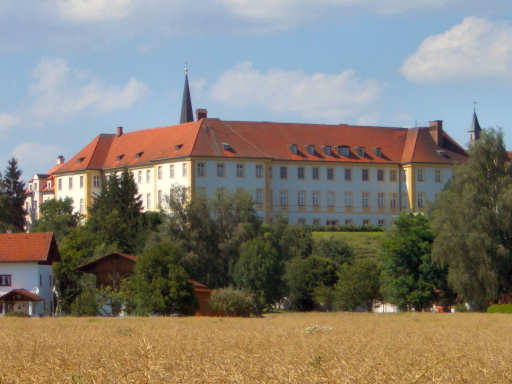
- Zangberg Abbey

- Coat of arms

- Location of Zangberg within Mühldorf am Inn district
- Interactive map of Zangberg
- Location within Germany Location within Bavaria
- Coordinates: 48°16′29″N 12°25′31″E
- Country: Germany
- State: Bavaria
- Admin. region: Oberbayern
- District: Mühldorf am Inn
- Municipal assoc.: Oberbergkirchen

Government
  - Mayor (2020–26): Georg Auer

Area
  - Total: 9.83 km^{2} (3.80 sq mi)
- Elevation: 430 m (1,410 ft)

Population (2025-12-31)
  - Total: 1,162
  - Density: 118/km^{2} (306/sq mi)
- Time zone: UTC+01:00 (CET)
  - Summer (DST): UTC+02:00 (CEST)
- Postal codes: 84539
- Dialling codes: 08636 08637 (Permering, Emerkam, Weiher, Grön, Landenham, Stegham, Kaps)
- Vehicle registration: MÜ
- Website: www.zangberg.de

Zangberg (German pronunciation: [ˈtsaŋbɛʁk]) is a municipality in the district of Mühldorf in Bavaria in Germany.

== Geography ==
Zangberg is located in the region Südostoberbayern at the northern part of the valley of the river Isen.

There are two local subdistricts: Weilkirchen, Zangberg.

The municipality of Zangberg has the following local districts: Atzging, Emerkam, Englhör, Hausmanning, Herrnteisenbach, Kaps, Kröppen, Landenham, Moos, Moosen, Palmberg, Permering, Stegham, Taubenthal, Weiher and Weilkirchen.

== History ==
Zangberg was mentioned the first time in 1285, while Weilkirchen was already attested in 788. It belonged to the district of Landshut and the district court of Neumarkt St. Veit. In course of the administrative reform of Bavaria in 1818 the current municipality was founded.

The village is determined by the 17th Century medieval building of the present monastery of St. Joseph. From 1862 until 1941 the Visitandines, also known as the Salesian Sisters, had a school for aristocratic girls, whose most famous pupil was probably Zita of Bourbon-Parma, later Empress of Austria as the wife of Charles I of Austria. There is still a Visitandine community here.

During World War II, a subcamp of Dachau concentration camp was located here.

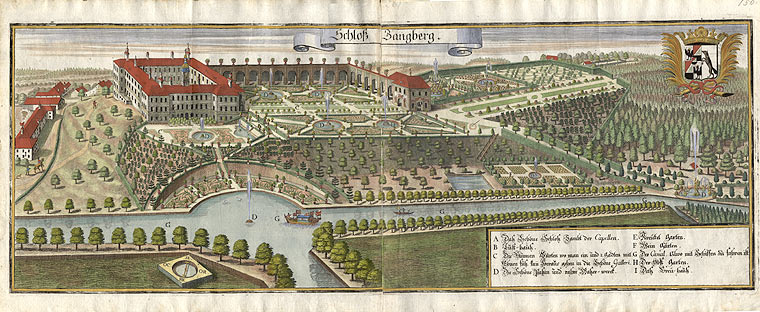
Depiction of Zangberg by Michael Wening (1645-1718).

Since Yvonne the cow lived in the woods near Zangberg, the village has been known as "Kuahort".

=== Demographics ===
In 1970 Zangberg had only 569 residents. The population grew to 800 in 1987 and to 947 in 2000. In 2004 the population reached 1000 residents.

== See also ==
- Georg, Elisabeth, and Barbara von Zangberg, illegitimate children of Henry XVI, Duke of Bavaria (1386-1450)
- Anita Orientar
