= Rohrbach (Verwaltungsgemeinschaft) =

- Verwaltungsgemeinschaft
- Location of Rohrbach within Mühldorf district
- Interactive map of Rohrbach
- Location within Germany Location within Bavaria
- Coordinates: 48°17′N 12°33′E
- Country: Germany
- State: Bavaria
- Admin. region: Upper Bavaria
- District: Mühldorf
- Seat: Erharting
- Subdivisions: 3 municipalities

Area
  - Total: 65.07 km^{2} (25.12 sq mi)

Population (2025-12-31)
  - Total: 3,653
  - Density: 56.14/km^{2} (145.4/sq mi)
- Time zone: UTC+01:00 (CET)
  - Summer (DST): UTC+02:00 (CEST)
- Website: www.vg-rohrbach.de

Rohrbach is a Verwaltungsgemeinschaft (municipal association) in the district of Mühldorf in Bavaria, Germany. Its seat is in Erharting.

It consists of the following municipalities:

1. Erharting
2. Niederbergkirchen
3. Niedertaufkirchen
