= Buchbach =

- Municipality
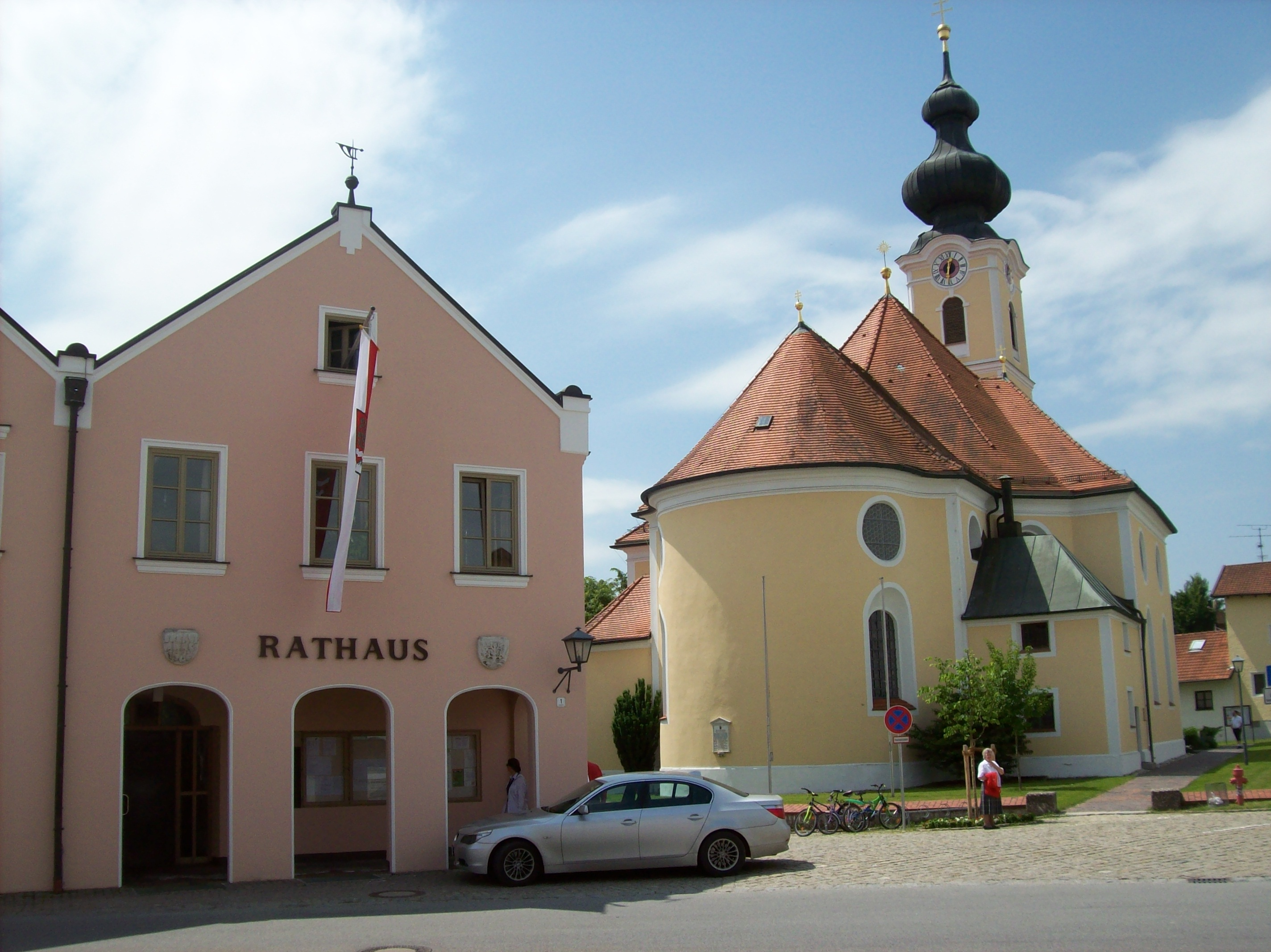
- Town hall and Church of Saint James

- Coat of arms

- Location of Buchbach within Mühldorf am Inn district
- Interactive map of Buchbach
- Location within Germany Location within Bavaria
- Coordinates: 48°19′N 12°17′E
- Country: Germany
- State: Bavaria
- Admin. region: Oberbayern
- District: Mühldorf am Inn

Government
  - Mayor (2020–26): Thomas Einwang jun.

Area
  - Total: 28.85 km^{2} (11.14 sq mi)
- Elevation: 449 m (1,473 ft)

Population (2025-12-31)
  - Total: 3,386
  - Density: 117.4/km^{2} (304.0/sq mi)
- Time zone: UTC+01:00 (CET)
  - Summer (DST): UTC+02:00 (CEST)
- Postal codes: 84428
- Dialling codes: 08086
- Vehicle registration: MÜ
- Website: www.buchbach.de

Buchbach (German pronunciation: [ˈbuːxbax]) is a municipality in the district of Mühldorf in Bavaria in Germany.

== Geography ==
The municipality is located in the region of southeastern Upper Bavaria in the foothills of the Alps. Buchbach borders directly on the districts of Erding and Landshut. The state capital Munich is about 63 km away.

== History ==
Buchbach was first mentioned in a document in 788. From 928 to 1803, with a brief interruption from 1266 to 1275, Buchbach belonged to the Prince-Archbishopric of Salzburg. Since 1266 it was documented as Markt (market). From 1803 it was part of the Electorate and later Kingdom of Bavaria. In the course of the administrative reforms in Bavaria, the municipality was created in 1818.

== Sports ==
Since 2026, Buchbach has been home to Peterka Arena, an ice hockey performance center featuring a 21 × 12 metre skills rink, operated by German player JJ Peterka and his father Dennis.
