= Rattenkirchen =

- Municipality
- Coat of arms

- Location of Rattenkirchen within Mühldorf am Inn district
- Interactive map of Rattenkirchen
- Location within Germany Location within Bavaria
- Coordinates: 48°15′N 12°19′E
- Country: Germany
- State: Bavaria
- Admin. region: Oberbayern
- District: Mühldorf am Inn
- Municipal assoc.: Heldenstein

Government
  - Mayor (2020–26): Rainer Greilmeier (CSU)

Area
  - Total: 19.87 km^{2} (7.67 sq mi)
- Elevation: 474 m (1,555 ft)

Population (2025-12-31)
  - Total: 1,075
  - Density: 54.10/km^{2} (140.1/sq mi)
- Time zone: UTC+01:00 (CET)
  - Summer (DST): UTC+02:00 (CEST)
- Postal codes: 84431
- Dialling codes: 08082, 08636
- Vehicle registration: MÜ
- Website: www.rattenkirchen.de

Rattenkirchen is a municipality in the district of Mühldorf in Bavaria in Germany.
