= Schönberg, Upper Bavaria =

Schönberg
- Municipality
- Coat of arms

- Location of Schönberg within Mühldorf am Inn district
- Interactive map of Schönberg
- Location within Germany Location within Bavaria
- Coordinates: 48°20′N 12°26′E
- Country: Germany
- State: Bavaria
- Admin. region: Oberbayern
- District: Mühldorf am Inn
- Municipal assoc.: Oberbergkirchen

Government
  - Mayor (2020–26): Alfred Lantenhammer (CSU)

Area
  - Total: 25.33 km^{2} (9.78 sq mi)
- Elevation: 470 m (1,540 ft)

Population (2025-12-31)
  - Total: 1,121
  - Density: 44.26/km^{2} (114.6/sq mi)
- Time zone: UTC+01:00 (CET)
  - Summer (DST): UTC+02:00 (CEST)
- Postal codes: 84573
- Dialling codes: 08652
- Vehicle registration: MÜ
- Website: Official website

Schönberg (German pronunciation: [ˈʃøːnbɛʁk]) is a municipality in the district of Mühldorf in the Upper Bavaria region of Bavaria, Germany.
