= Oberbergkirchen (Verwaltungsgemeinschaft) =

- Verwaltungsgemeinschaft
- Location of Oberbergkirchen within Mühldorf district
- Interactive map of Oberbergkirchen
- Location within Germany Location within Bavaria
- Coordinates: 48°18′N 12°23′E
- Country: Germany
- State: Bavaria
- Admin. region: Upper Bavaria
- District: Mühldorf
- Seat: Oberbergkirchen
- Subdivisions: 4 municipalities

Area
  - Total: 77.62 km^{2} (29.97 sq mi)

Population (2025-12-31)
  - Total: 4,882
  - Density: 62.90/km^{2} (162.9/sq mi)
- Time zone: UTC+01:00 (CET)
  - Summer (DST): UTC+02:00 (CEST)
- Website: www.oberbergkirchen.de

Oberbergkirchen is a Verwaltungsgemeinschaft (municipal association) in the district of Mühldorf in Bavaria, Germany. Its seat is in Oberbergkirchen.

It consists of the following municipalities:

1. Lohkirchen
2. Oberbergkirchen
3. Schönberg
4. Zangberg
