= Polling, Mühldorf =

Polling
- Municipality
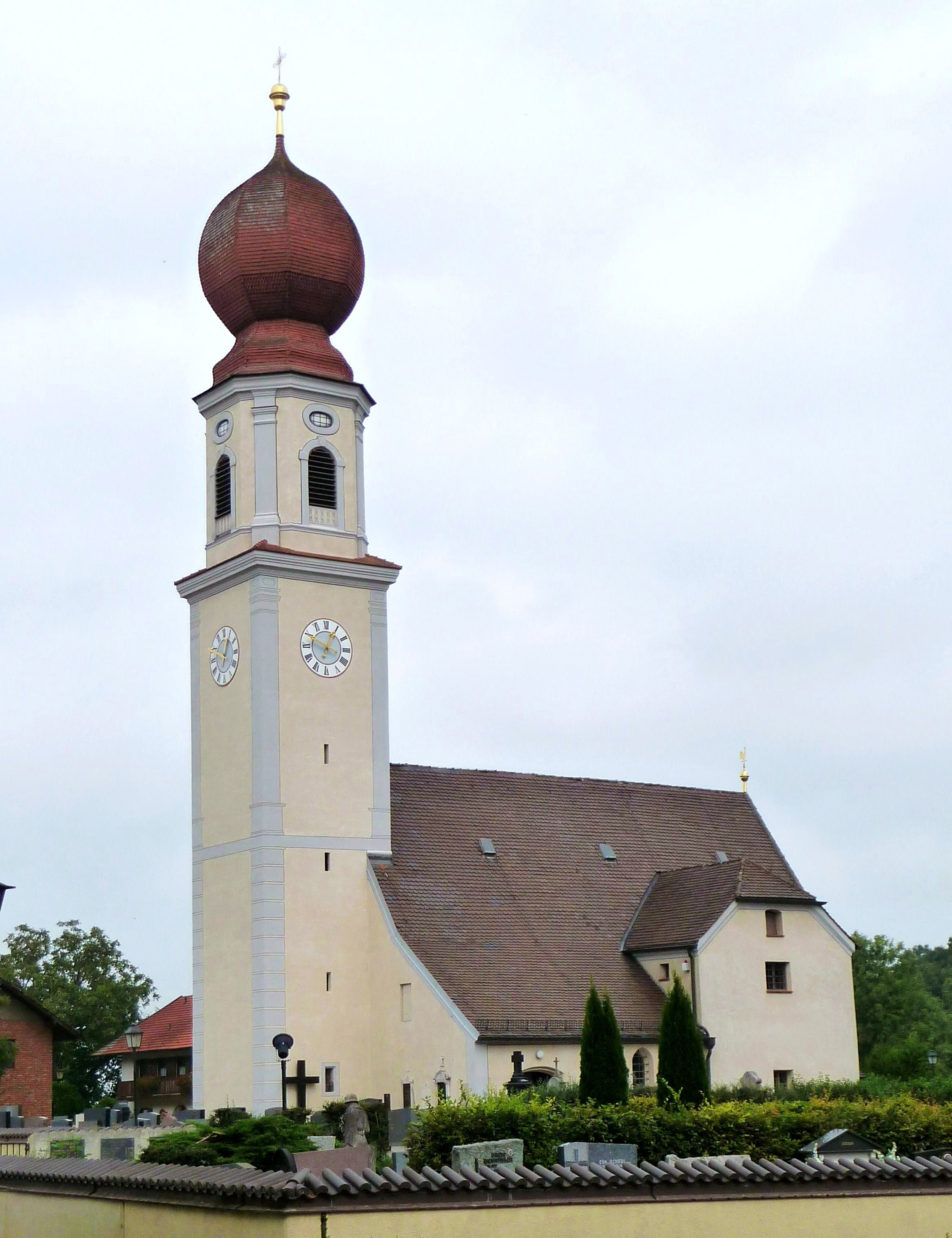
- Church of the Visitation of the Virgin Mary

- Coat of arms

- Location of Polling within Mühldorf district
- Interactive map of Polling
- Location within Germany Location within Bavaria
- Coordinates: 48°13′N 12°34′E
- Country: Germany
- State: Bavaria
- Admin. region: Oberbayern
- District: Mühldorf
- Municipal assoc.: Polling

Government
  - Mayor (2020–26): Lorenz Kronberger

Area
  - Total: 43.85 km^{2} (16.93 sq mi)
- Elevation: 410 m (1,350 ft)

Population (2025-12-31)
  - Total: 3,324
  - Density: 75.80/km^{2} (196.3/sq mi)
- Time zone: UTC+01:00 (CET)
  - Summer (DST): UTC+02:00 (CEST)
- Postal codes: 84570
- Dialling codes: 08633
- Vehicle registration: MÜ
- Website: Official website

Polling (German pronunciation: [ˈpɔlɪŋ]) is a municipality in the district of Mühldorf in Bavaria in Germany. It lies on the river Inn.
