= Neumarkt-Sankt Veit (Verwaltungsgemeinschaft) =

- Verwaltungsgemeinschaft
- Location of Neumarkt-Sankt Veit within Mühldorf district
- Interactive map of Neumarkt-Sankt Veit
- Location within Germany Location within Bavaria
- Coordinates: 48°22′N 12°30′E
- Country: Germany
- State: Bavaria
- Admin. region: Upper Bavaria
- District: Mühldorf
- Seat: Neumarkt-Sankt Veit
- Subdivisions: 2 municipalities

Area
  - Total: 75.05 km^{2} (28.98 sq mi)

Population (2025-12-31)
  - Total: 7,783
  - Density: 103.7/km^{2} (268.6/sq mi)
- Time zone: UTC+01:00 (CET)
  - Summer (DST): UTC+02:00 (CEST)
- Website: www.vgnsv.de

Neumarkt-Sankt Veit is a Verwaltungsgemeinschaft (municipal association) in the district of Mühldorf in Bavaria, Germany. Its seat is in Neumarkt-Sankt Veit.

It consists of the following municipalities:

1. Neumarkt-Sankt Veit
2. Egglkofen
