= Franz Ackermann =

German painter and installation artist (born 1963)

- Born: 1963 (age 62–63); Neumarkt-Sankt Veit, Bavaria, West Germany
- Education: Akademie der Bildenden Kunste, Munich
- Known for: Painting, Installation art
- Movement: Contemporary art

Franz Ackermann (born 1963 in Neumarkt-Sankt Veit, Bavaria) is a German painter and installation artist based in Berlin. He makes cartoonish abstraction.

== Life ==
Munich subway station Georg-Brauchle-Ring (U1) designed by Franz Ackermann

He attended the Akademie der Bildenden Kunste in Munich from 1984 to 1988 and the Hochschule für bildende Künste Hamburg from 1989 to 1991, where he studied under Bernhard J. Blume. His studies took him to Hong Kong thanks to the German Academic Exchange Service. Since 2001 he has been a professor of painting at the Karlsruhe Art Academy.

The themes of his works focus often on issues like travelling, globalization and the aesthetics of large urban areas. Of particular note is the series of paintings about travelling called Mind Maps. The paintings from that series include small format watercolor or gouache sketches. The first painting of the Mind Maps was created on a Chinese block measuring 13 by 17 cm in Hong Kong. Ackermann still likes to work in small sizes. The papers show almost realistic architectural views, biomorphic ornamentation, cartographic moments (e.g. suggested streets), mixed with abstract, bright and broken color areas and geometric constructions.

In 2012, Ackermann spent two months in Buenos Aires, Argentina. The result were 25 large format wooden panels containing his maps, which were shown in November of the same year in an annex of the Faena Arts Center in Buenos Aires. In 2013, he designed several interior wall segments in the hallways and rooms of the judges' building at the Baumgarten Building, the headquarters of the Federal Constitutional Court, in Karlsruhe.

In 2004, Ackermann was nominated for the Hugo Boss Award. In 2005 he received the "IFM Kunst am Bau Prize 2005" for his mural The Great Journey at the Munich Georg Brauchle-Ring subway station, in Munich.

He has exhibited in several countries. In 2002 he took part in the 25th São Paulo Biennale with large-format works. He also entered the Venice Biennale, in 2003. His other exhibitions have been "Drawing Now: 8 Propositions" at the Museum of Modern Art in New York City, "Hybrids" at Tate Liverpool, "Global Navigation System" at Palais de Tokyo in Paris and "Seasons in the Sun" at the Stedelijk Museum, in Amsterdam.

He is represented by Neugerriemschneider in Berlin, Gavin Brown's Enterprise, in New York, Meyer Riegger gallery in Karlsruhe, Galeria Fortes Vilaca, in São Paulo, and Gio Marconi, in Milan.

== Art market ==
The best selling of his paintings was Mental Map: Evasion IV (1996–1997), who sold by £288,000 ($585,794) at Philipps, London, on 13 October 2007.

== Public collections ==
His works are held in several public collections, including the Carnegie Museum of Art, in Pittsburgh, the Denver Art Museum, the Kunsthalle Basel, the Kunstmuseum Wolfsburg, the Metropolitan Museum of Art, in New York, the Museum of Modern Art, in New York, and the San Francisco Museum of Modern Art.

== See also ==
- List of German painters
