= Anita Orientar =

German painter, art historian and writer (1896 – 1994)

Dr. Anita Orientar
- Born: 24 January 1894; Bahia, Brazil
- Died: 1994 (aged 99–100); Zangberg, Germany

Academic work
- Discipline: Art history

Anita Orientar (8 January 1896, Bahia, Brazil–1994, Zangberg) was a German painter, art historian and writer.

== Life ==
Anita Orientar was born in Bahia, Brazil on 8 January 1896. Her father was a Romanian diamond merchant (Note: The information about Romania is provided by Wendland, but no further details. Orienter's father may also have come from a part of Austria-Hungary that became Romanian after 1918; this is unclear) and her mother was a German Jew from Berlin. Antisemitism caused her family to move several times. Mother and daughter moved from Brazil to Paris between 1897 and 1899.

Between 1899 and 1926, she lived in Berlin. In 1928, she went to Italy, settling near Lake Garda. In 1939, Orintar returned to Rio de Janeiro with her father, who had gone blind, and her mother, who had heart problems. She lived in Brazil until 1962, then moved to New York for a year and then to Vence, where she remained until 1978. From 1978 to 1994, she resided at the Zangberg Monastery in Bavaria, Germany, where she died.

She held a PhD in art history.

== Career ==
At the age of six, she visited a museum with her mother and where she discovered her interest in art. However, the constant change of country that was part of her life limited her artistic activities. Initially, she began to paint Italian landscapes in watercolours. It was during this period that she painted The Mysteries of the Rosary for a church on Lake Garda (Italy).

During her time in Brazil from 1939 to 1962, her participation in an exhibition at the National Museum of Fine Arts led to numerous requests for her works for churches. In 1963, she returned to Europe and dedicated herself to abstract painting. She converted from Judaism to Catholicism at the age of 33 and wrote about religion.

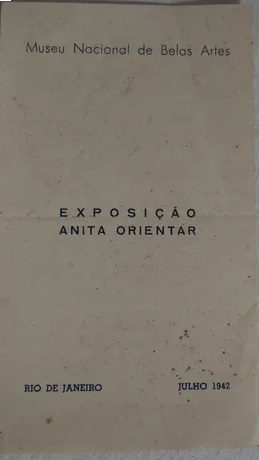
Catalogue of the exhibition at the Museu Nacional de Belas Artes (1942)

== Works ==
- Orienter, Anita (1921). Der seelische Ausdruck in der altdeutschen Malerei: ein entwicklungsgeschichtlicher Versuch. München: Delphin.
  - Die Wandlungen des Ausdrucks in der altdeutschen Kunst. 1969.
- Ein Pilger nur. Leipzig: St. Benno-Verlag. 1967.
  - Un Pèlerinage judéo-chrétien. 1968.
- Gottsuche – Gottbegegnung. Eine Untaugliche will die Welt bekehren. Maximilian Kolbe-Verlag. 1980.
- Im Licht des Ostermorgens. Fastenzeit-Betrachtungen. 1981.
- Kommet zu meinem Geschenk!. 1993.

== Exhibitions ==
- 1925 - Berlin, Heller Gallery, Kurfürstendamm
- 1942, 1944 - Rio de Janeiro, National Museum of Fine Arts
- 1946 - Rio de Janeiro, Copacabana Palace
- 1950 - New York, New York Public Library, 42nd Street
- 1962 - New York, Duncan Galleries
- 1963 - Munich, Gurlitt
- 1966 - Nice, St. Thomas Hall
