= Reichertsheim =

- Municipality
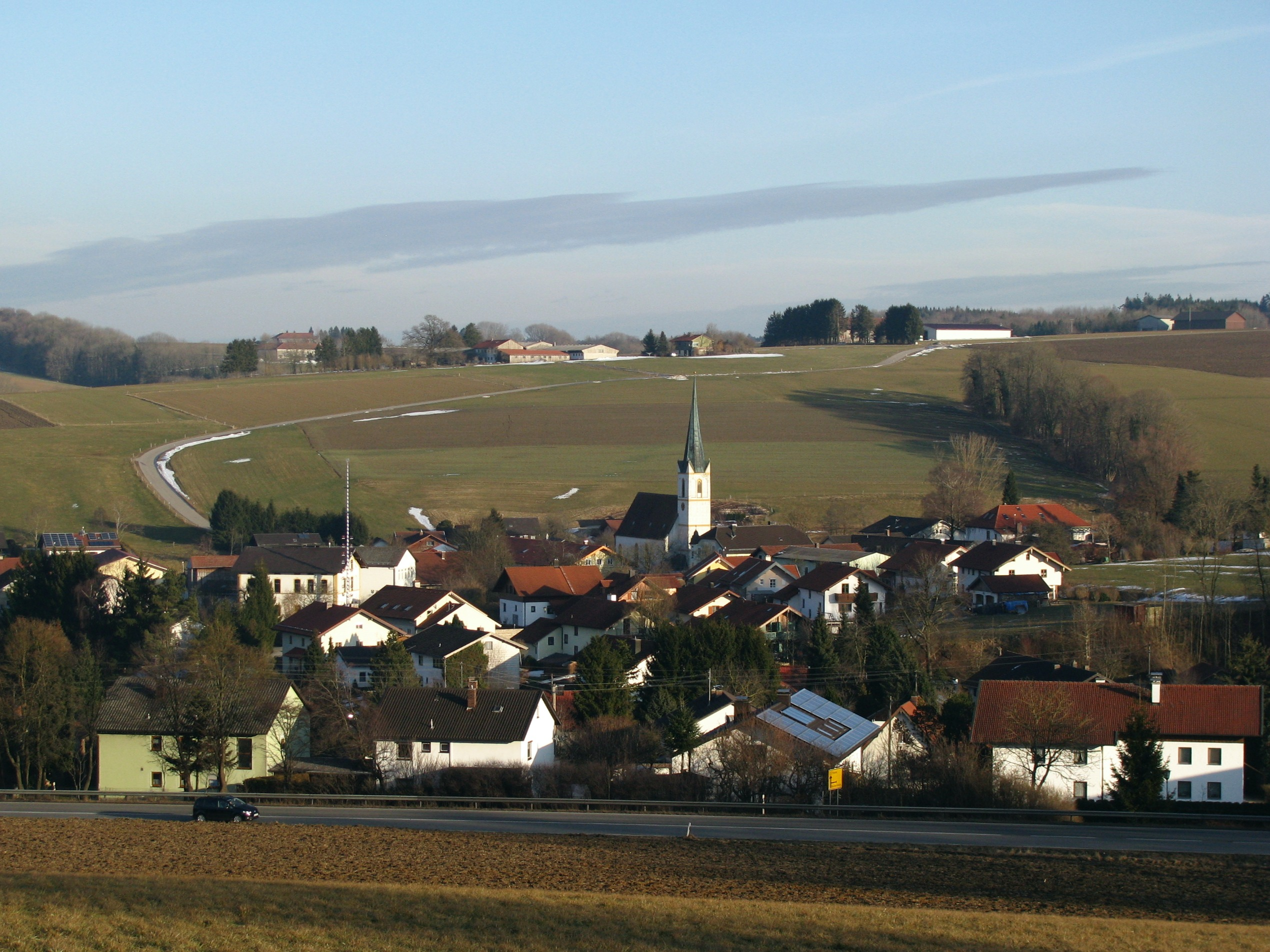
- Reichertsheim

- Coat of arms

- Location of Reichertsheim within Mühldorf am Inn district
- Interactive map of Reichertsheim
- Location within Germany Location within Bavaria
- Coordinates: 48°12′N 12°17′E
- Country: Germany
- State: Bavaria
- Admin. region: Oberbayern
- District: Mühldorf am Inn
- Municipal assoc.: Reichertsheim

Government
  - Mayor (2020–26): Franz Stein

Area
  - Total: 31.38 km^{2} (12.12 sq mi)
- Elevation: 521 m (1,709 ft)

Population (2025-12-31)
  - Total: 1,729
  - Density: 55.10/km^{2} (142.7/sq mi)
- Time zone: UTC+01:00 (CET)
  - Summer (DST): UTC+02:00 (CEST)
- Postal codes: 84437
- Dialling codes: 08073
- Vehicle registration: MÜ
- Website: www.gemeinde-reichertsheim.de

Reichertsheim is a municipality in the district of Mühldorf in Bavaria in Germany.
