= Oberbergkirchen =

- Municipality
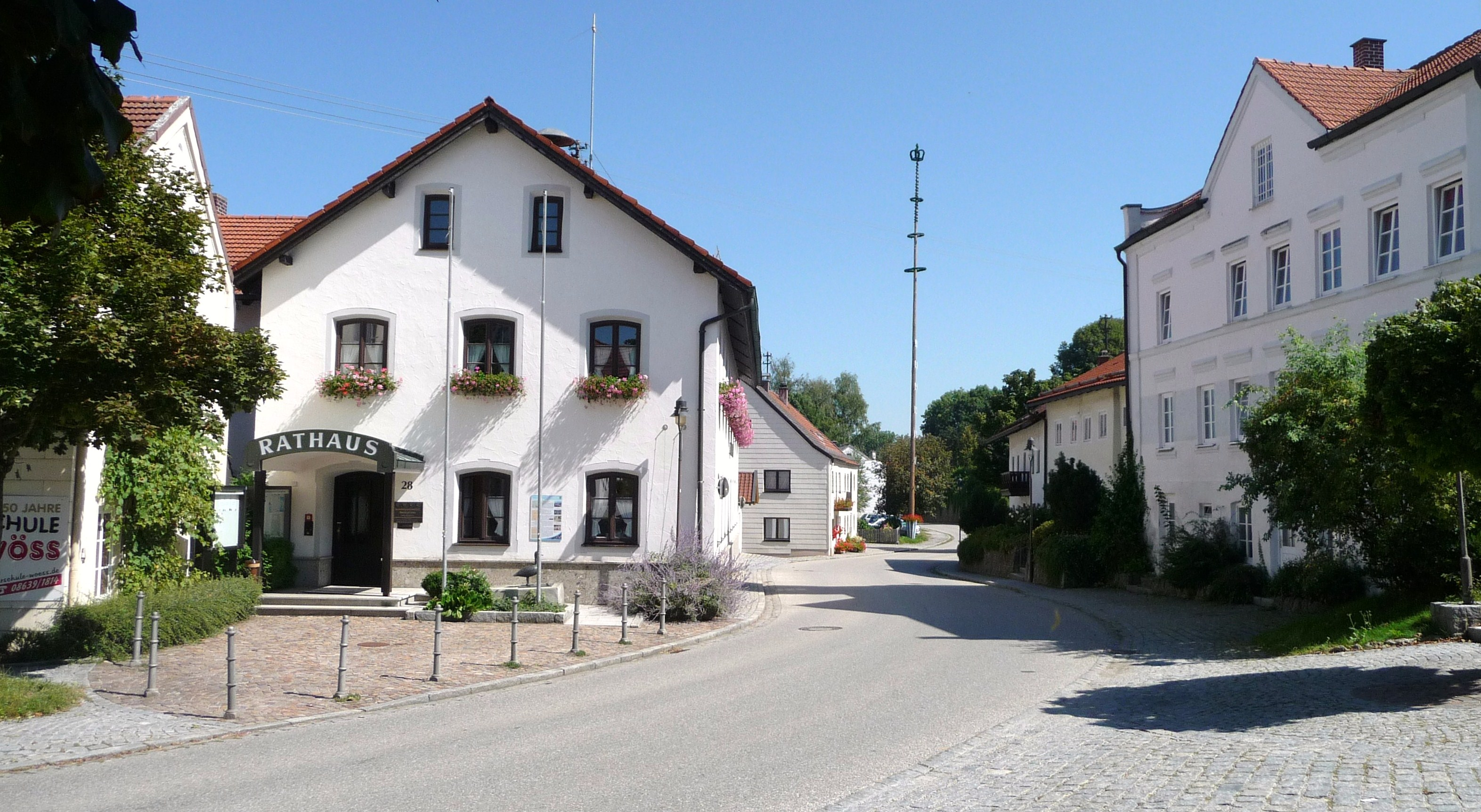
- Town hall

- Coat of arms

- Location of Oberbergkirchen within Mühldorf am Inn district
- Interactive map of Oberbergkirchen
- Location within Germany Location within Bavaria
- Coordinates: 48°17′N 12°22′E
- Country: Germany
- State: Bavaria
- Admin. region: Oberbayern
- District: Mühldorf am Inn
- Municipal assoc.: Oberbergkirchen

Government
  - Mayor (2020–26): Michael Hausperger (CSU)

Area
  - Total: 27.54 km^{2} (10.63 sq mi)
- Elevation: 485 m (1,591 ft)

Population (2025-12-31)
  - Total: 1,766
  - Density: 64.12/km^{2} (166.1/sq mi)
- Time zone: UTC+01:00 (CET)
  - Summer (DST): UTC+02:00 (CEST)
- Postal codes: 84564
- Dialling codes: 08637
- Vehicle registration: MÜ
- Website: www.oberbergkirchen.de

Oberbergkirchen is a municipality in the district of Mühldorf in Bavaria in Germany.
