= Heldenstein (Verwaltungsgemeinschaft) =

- Verwaltungsgemeinschaft
- Location of Heldenstein within Mühldorf district
- Interactive map of Heldenstein
- Location within Germany Location within Bavaria
- Coordinates: 48°15′N 12°22′E
- Country: Germany
- State: Bavaria
- Admin. region: Upper Bavaria
- District: Mühldorf
- Seat: Heldenstein
- Subdivisions: 2 municipalities

Area
  - Total: 39.72 km^{2} (15.34 sq mi)

Population (2025-12-31)
  - Total: 3,888
  - Density: 97.89/km^{2} (253.5/sq mi)
- Time zone: UTC+01:00 (CET)
  - Summer (DST): UTC+02:00 (CEST)
- Website: www.heldenstein-online.de

Heldenstein is a Verwaltungsgemeinschaft (municipal association) in the district of Mühldorf in Bavaria, Germany. Its seat is in Heldenstein.

It consists of the following municipalities:

1. Heldenstein
2. Rattenkirchen
