= Waldkraiburg =

- Town
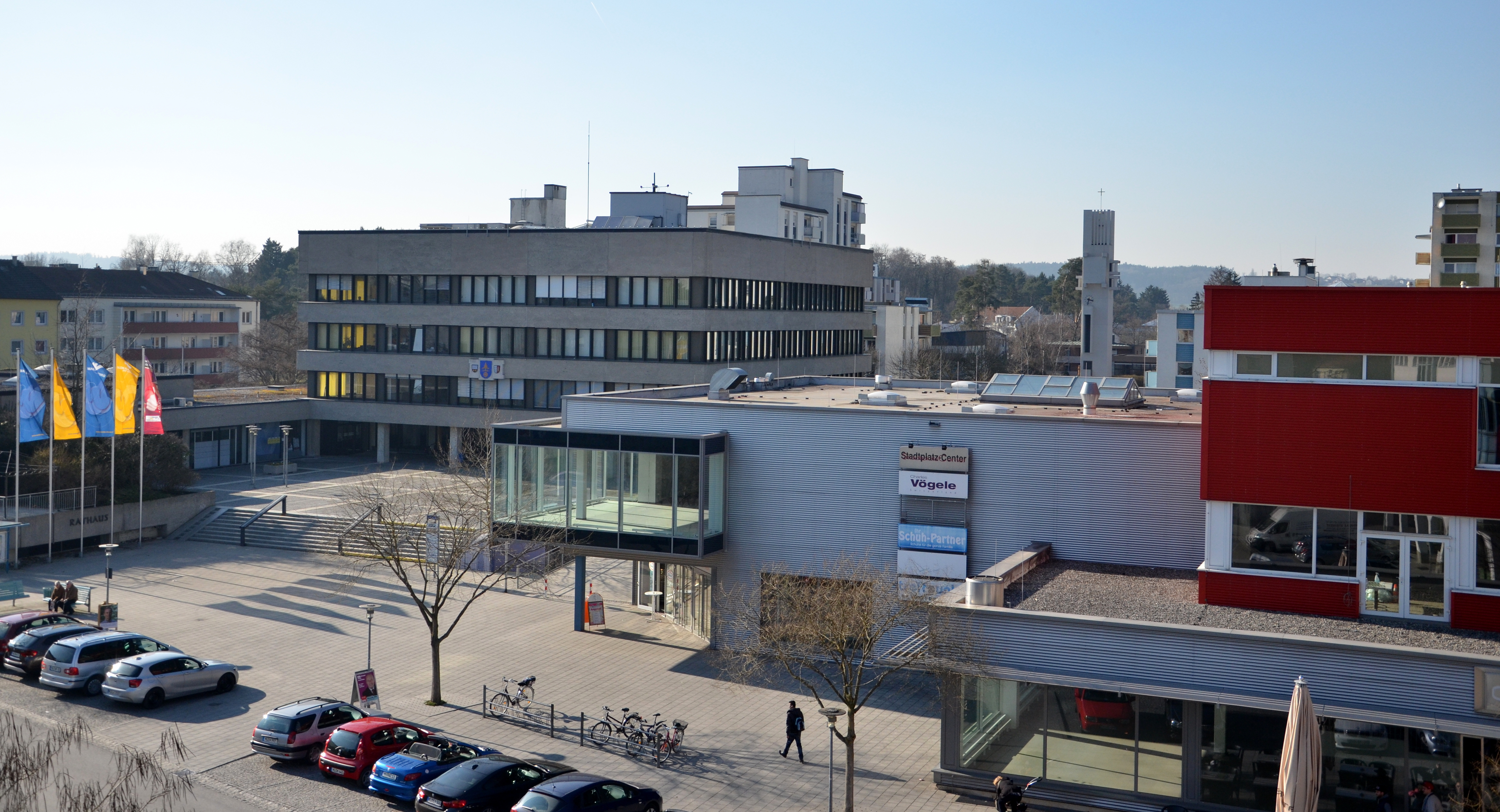
- Town hall

- Coat of arms

- Location of Waldkraiburg within Mühldorf am Inn district
- Interactive map of Waldkraiburg
- Location within Germany Location within Bavaria
- Coordinates: 48°13′N 12°24′E
- Country: Germany
- State: Bavaria
- Admin. region: Oberbayern
- District: Mühldorf am Inn

Government
  - Mayor (2020–26): Robert Pötzsch

Area
  - Total: 21.56 km^{2} (8.32 sq mi)
- Elevation: 436 m (1,430 ft)

Population (2025-12-31)
  - Total: 25,851
  - Density: 1,199/km^{2} (3,105/sq mi)
- Time zone: UTC+01:00 (CET)
  - Summer (DST): UTC+02:00 (CEST)
- Postal codes: 84478
- Dialling codes: 08638
- Vehicle registration: MÜ
- Website: www.waldkraiburg.de

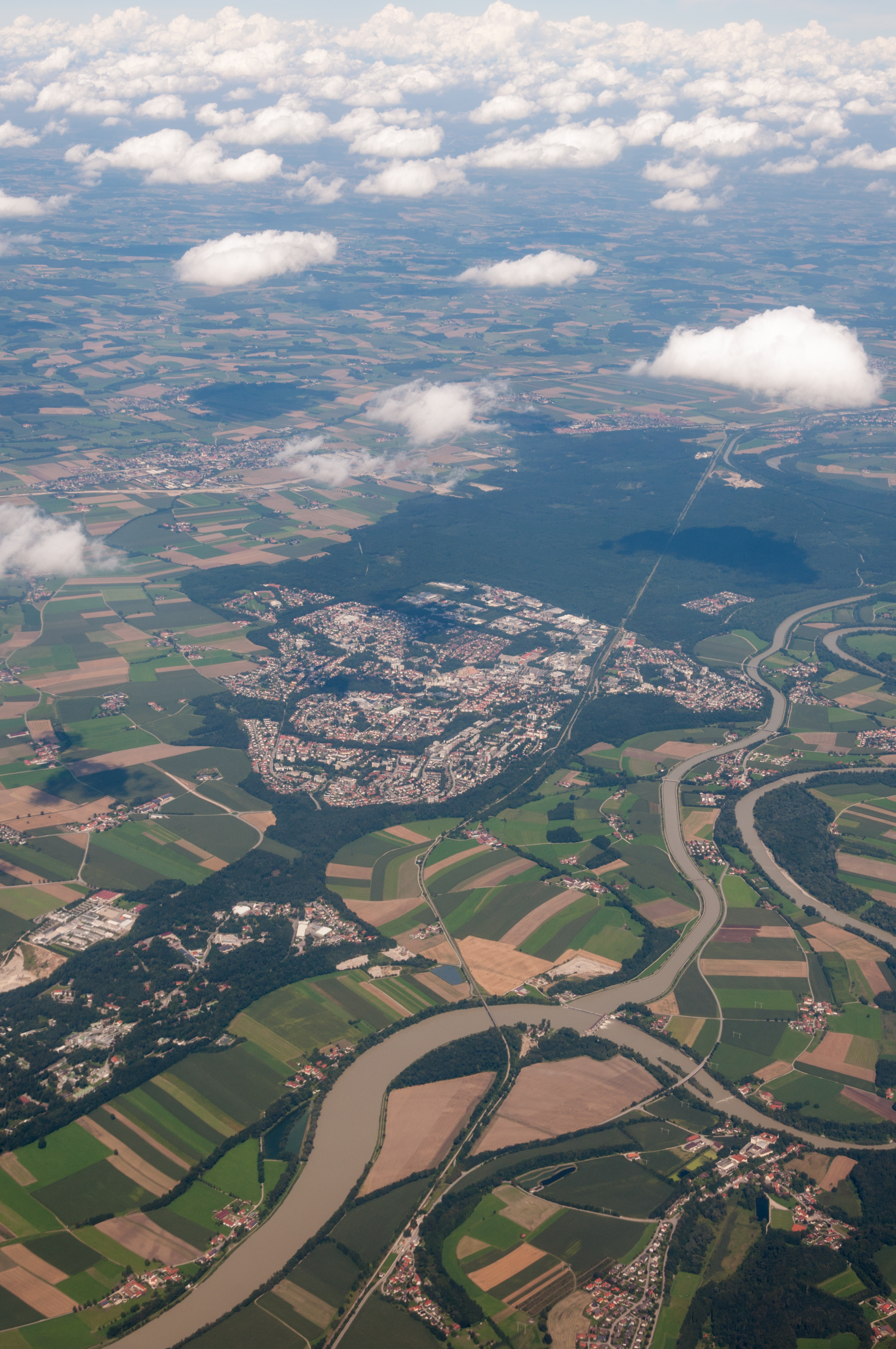
Aerial view of Waldkraiburg

Waldkraiburg (German pronunciation: [valtˈkʁaɪbʊʁk]; Central Bavarian: Woidkroaburg) is a town in the district of Mühldorf, in Bavaria, Germany with a population of about 24,000. It is the biggest town in the district of Mühldorf. It is located on the river Inn, approximately ten kilometers southwest of Mühldorf and sixty kilometers east of Munich. Waldkraiburg is one of the Bavarian displaced person cities. During World War II, an armour factory fabricated gunpowder in this area. The remaining bunkers were soon used as makeshift housing for displaced persons from Bohemia.

Officially founded on April 1, 1950, the community grew fast and, in 1960, it was granted the rights of a town. Today, chemical and engine building factories are located in Waldkraiburg.

== Sport clubs and other associations ==
- EHC Waldkraiburg
- EC Grizzly's
- Runningclub LC Bayern
- Motorclub Waldkraiburg in the ADAC
- Rock'n Roll & Boogie-Club "Hot Socks"
- Shooting Club Waldkraiburg
- Squashclub Waldkraiburg
- Diving Club TC Manta
- Dancing Club Weiß-Blau 70 e.V. Waldkraiburg
- VfL Waldkraiburg

== Partner cities ==
- Sartrouville, France

== Notable people ==
- Ferdinand Staeger (1880–1976), in Waldkraiburg; he was a German painter
- Emilie Schindler is buried in Waldkraiburg; She was the wife of Oskar Schindler
- Peter Maffay grew up in Waldkraiburg

=== Sons and daughters of the city ===
- Julia Mürkens: January 1, 2007; she was invested "Miss Bayern"
