= Mühldorf (district) =

Coordinates: 48°15′N 12°25′E

- District
- Flag Coat of arms
- Country: Germany
- State: Bavaria
- Adm. region: Upper Bavaria
- Capital: Mühldorf

Government
  - District admin.: Maximilian Heimerl (CSU)

Area
  - Total: 805.32 km^{2} (310.94 sq mi)

Population (31 December 2025)
  - Total: 122,314
  - Density: 151.88/km^{2} (393.37/sq mi)
- Time zone: UTC+01:00 (CET)
  - Summer (DST): UTC+02:00 (CEST)
- Vehicle registration: MÜ
- Website: landkreis-muehldorf.de

Mühldorf is a Landkreis (district) in Upper Bavaria, Germany. It is bounded by (from the north and clockwise) the districts of Landshut, Rottal-Inn, Altötting, Traunstein, Rosenheim, Ebersberg and Erding.

== History ==
Most parts of the district have belonged to Bavaria from the 13th century on. The archbishopric of Salzburg possessed some estates in the region as well from the year 798. In 1803, when the clerical states of Holy Empire were dissolved, Bavaria annexed these estates.

== Geography ==
The district is located in generally plain countryside on either bank of the river Inn.

== Coat of arms ==
The coat of arms displays:

- the heraldic lion of Salzburg
- the heraldic lion of the Electorate of the Palatinate

== Towns and municipalities ==
Clickable map of towns and municipalities in the district

Towns
1. Mühldorf
2. Waldkraiburg
Märkte
1. Buchbach
2. Haag in Oberbayern
Municipalities
1. Ampfing
2. Aschau am Inn
3. Mettenheim
4. Obertaufkirchen
5. Schwindegg

Verwaltungsgemeinschaften
1. Gars am Inn; 1. Gars am Inn^{1,3}; 2. Unterreit; 2. Heldenstein; 1. Heldenstein^{1}; 2. Rattenkirchen	3. Kraiburg am Inn; 1. Kraiburg^{1,3}; 2. Jettenbach; 3. Taufkirchen	4. Maitenbeth; 1. Maitenbeth^{1}; 2. Rechtmehring; 5. Neumarkt-Sankt Veit; 1. Neumarkt-Sankt Veit^{1,2}; 2. Egglkofen	6. Oberbergkirchen; 1. Lohkirchen; 2. Oberbergkirchen^{1}; 3. Schönberg; 4. Zangberg; 7. Polling; 1. Oberneukirchen; 2. Polling^{1}	8. Reichertsheim; 1. Kirchdorf; 2. Reichertsheim^{1}; 9. Rohrbach; 1. Erharting^{1}; 2. Niederbergkirchen; 3. Niedertaufkirchen
^{1}seat of the Verwaltungsgemeinschaft; ^{2}town; ^{3}Markt

== Bibliography ==
Freed, John B. Noble Bondsmen: Ministerial Marriages in the Archdiocese of Salzburg, 1100-1343. (Ithaca, NY: Cornell University Press, 1995).
