= Taufkirchen, Mühldorf =

Taufkirchen
- Municipality
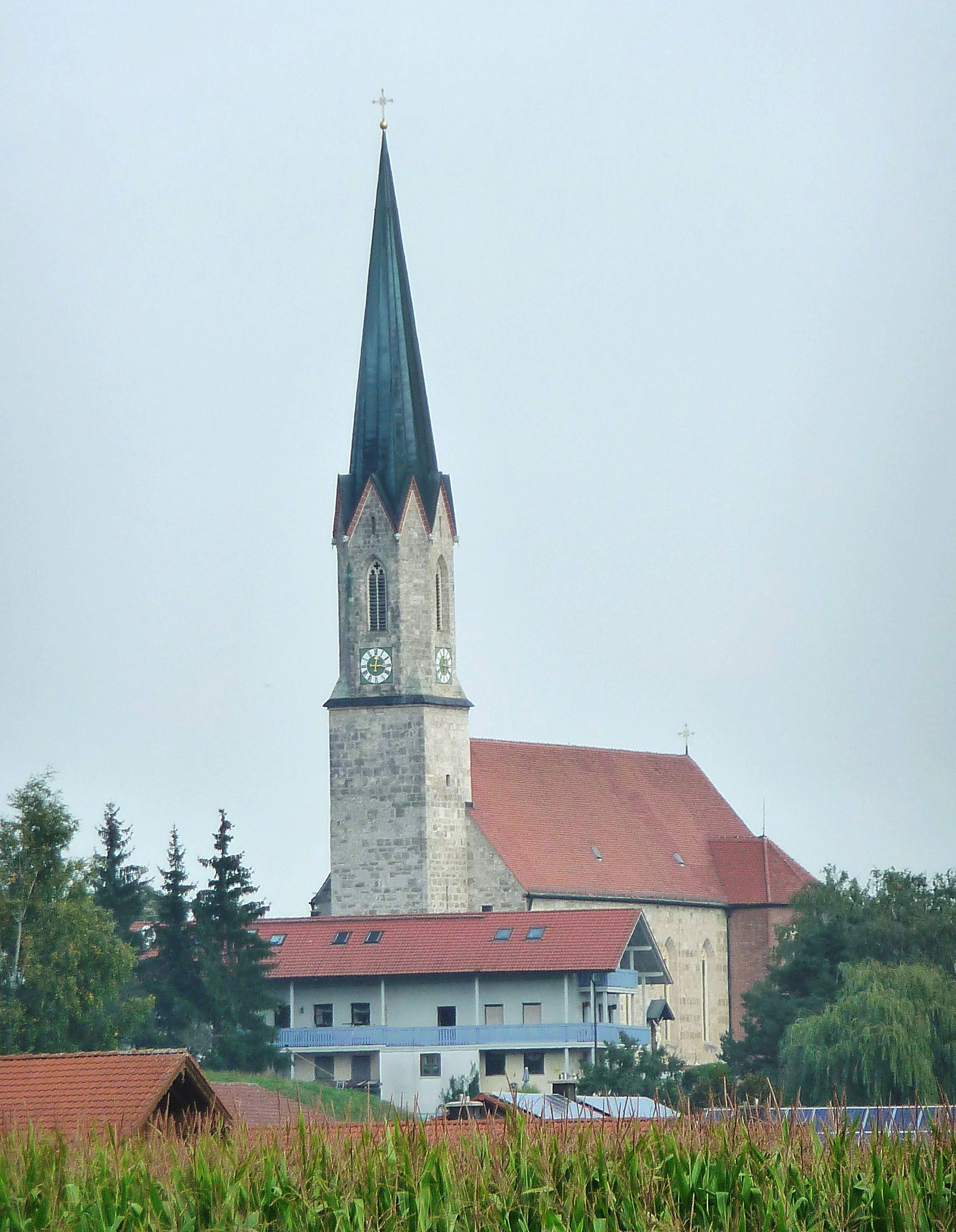
- Parish church of Saint Jacob

- Coat of arms

- Location of Taufkirchen within Mühldorf district
- Interactive map of Taufkirchen
- Location within Germany Location within Bavaria
- Coordinates: 48°12′N 12°30′E
- Country: Germany
- State: Bavaria
- Admin. region: Oberbayern
- District: Mühldorf
- Municipal assoc.: Kraiburg am Inn

Government
  - Mayor (2020–26): Alfons Mittermaier

Area
  - Total: 25.33 km^{2} (9.78 sq mi)
- Elevation: 468 m (1,535 ft)

Population (2025-12-31)
  - Total: 1,389
  - Density: 54.84/km^{2} (142.0/sq mi)
- Time zone: UTC+01:00 (CET)
  - Summer (DST): UTC+02:00 (CEST)
- Postal codes: 84574
- Dialling codes: 08638, 08630, 08622
- Vehicle registration: MÜ
- Website: taufkirchen.lra-mü.de

Taufkirchen (German pronunciation: [taʊfˈkɪʁçn̩]) is a municipality in the district of Mühldorf in Bavaria in Germany.
