= Maitenbeth =

- Municipality
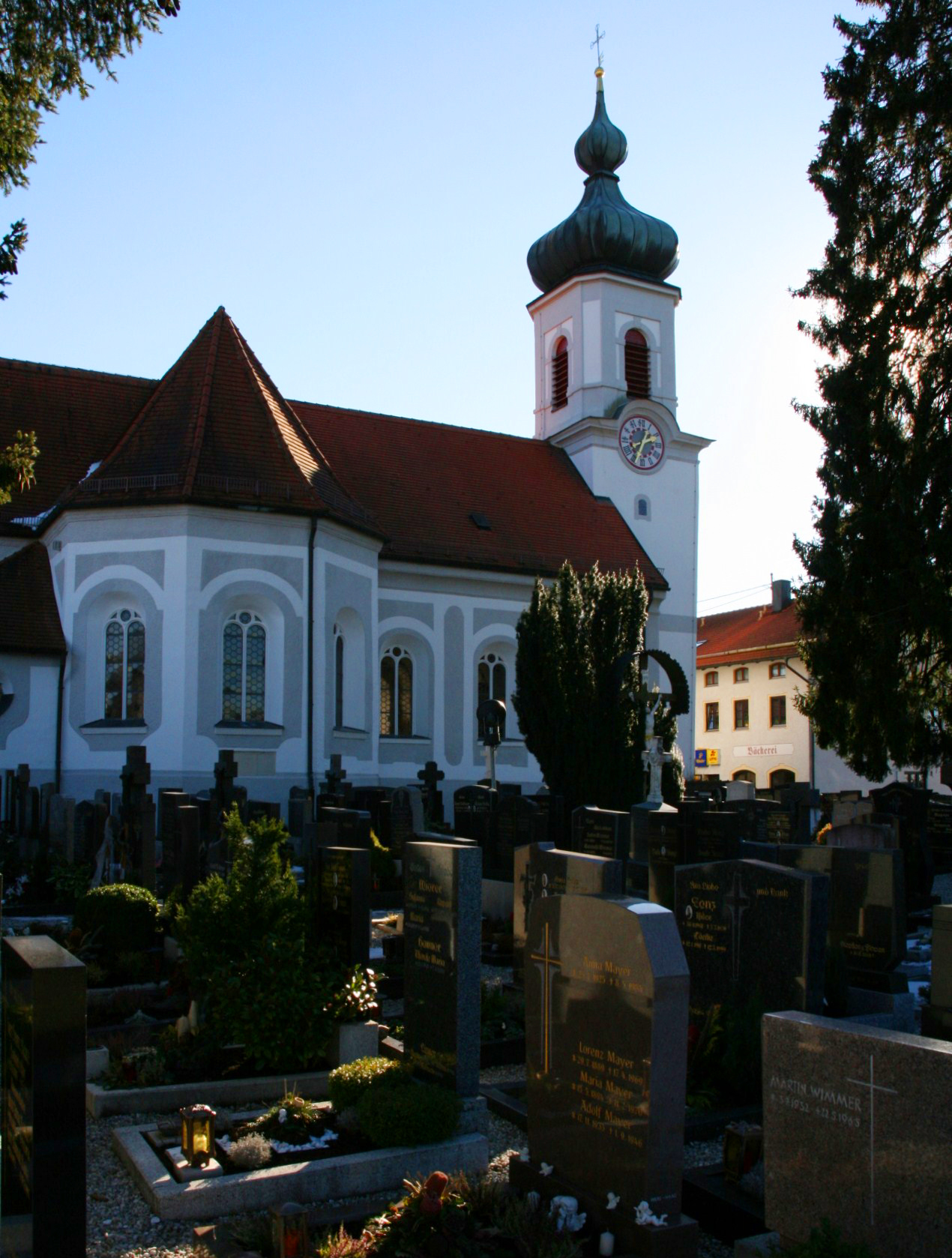
- Saint Agatha Church

- Coat of arms

- Location of Maitenbeth within Mühldorf am Inn district
- Interactive map of Maitenbeth
- Location within Germany Location within Bavaria
- Coordinates: 48°09′00″N 12°05′30″E
- Country: Germany
- State: Bavaria
- Admin. region: Oberbayern
- District: Mühldorf am Inn
- Municipal assoc.: Maitenbeth
- Subdivisions: 58 Ortsteile

Government
  - Mayor (2020–26): Thomas Stark

Area
  - Total: 30.94 km^{2} (11.95 sq mi)
- Elevation: 609 m (1,998 ft)

Population (2025-12-31)
  - Total: 2,076
  - Density: 67.10/km^{2} (173.8/sq mi)
- Time zone: UTC+01:00 (CET)
  - Summer (DST): UTC+02:00 (CEST)
- Postal codes: 83558
- Dialling codes: 08076
- Vehicle registration: MÜ
- Website: www.maitenbeth.de

Maitenbeth is a municipality in the district of Mühldorf in Bavaria in Germany.

Maitenbeth consists of 58 official localities:

- Barthub
- Berg
- Bernreit
- Brand
- Brandstätt
- Bräustätt
- Dichtldorn
- Dieblstätt
- Edgarten
- Eßbaum
- Etschlohe
- Feichten
- Gassen
- Ginhub
- Gmain
- Goldbrunn
- Haslach
- Hatzmoos
- Heilbrunn
- Hennezogl
- Hof
- Honau
- Innach
- Kopfsöd
- Kramerberg
- Kreuz
- Kronsöd
- Lacken
- Lichtfelden
- Löfflmoos
- Lohen
- Luhestätt
- Luxstätt
- Maitenbeth
- Marsmeier
- Mitterhof
- Moos
- Neukirchen
- Niesberg
- Oberöd
- Ochsenfurt
- Oed
- Perzl
- Pfaffenberg
- Pointner
- Rain
- Rappolten
- Rückertsbichl
- Schellenberg
- Schranken
- Seilbach
- Siebenhart
- Steinweg
- Straß
- Straßmaier
- Tegernbach
- Thal
- Weinhub
