= 2022 in Austria =

- Decades: 2000s; 2010s; 2020s
- See also: Other events of 2022; List of years in Austria

Events in the year 2022 in Austria.

== Incumbents ==
- President: Alexander Van der Bellen
- Chancellor: Karl Nehammer

=== Governors ===
- Burgenland: Hans Peter Doskozil
- Carinthia: Peter Kaiser
- Lower Austria: Johanna Mikl-Leitner
- Salzburg: Wilfried Haslauer Jr.
- Styria:
  - Hermann Schützenhöfer (until June 4)
  - Christopher Drexler (from June 4)
- Tyrol:
  - Günther Platter (until October 25)
  - Anton Mattle (from October 25)
- Upper Austria: Thomas Stelzer
- Vienna: Michael Ludwig
- Vorarlberg: Markus Wallner

== Events ==
- January 1 – Austria legalizes assisted suicide for people over the age of 18 years who are terminally ill or who suffer from a permanent, debilitating condition.
- January 20 – The Austrian National Council votes 137–13 to approve a bill requiring people over 18 years to receive the COVID-19 vaccine beginning on 1 February, becoming the first country in the European Union to do so.
- February 28 – Diplomats from the U.S., United Kingdom, France, Germany, Russia, China, and Iran gather in Vienna, Austria to seek a deal to revive the 2015 Iran deal.
- May 9 – Münchendorf derailment
- May 22 – Austria confirms its first case of monkeypox.
- August 18 – 2022 European derecho: Five people are killed by storms in Austria.
- September 25 – The 2022 Tyrolean state election was held. Incumbent Günther Platter resigns and Anton Mattle gets elected
- October 9 – 2022 Austrian presidential election: Incumbent president Alexander van der Bellen secures reelection after receiving more than 50% of the votes.
- December 8 – Austria announces that it will veto Bulgaria and Romania's accession to the Schengen Area, citing fears of increased illegal immigration.
- December 15 – At least four people are injured, one of them seriously, when an avalanche hits the ski resort Zürs/Lech in Vorarlberg, Austria. Emergency services rescue all of the ten people who had been buried alive.

== Deaths ==
=== January ===
- January 8 – Manfred Srb, 80, Austrian politician, MP (1986–1994) (b. 1941).
- January 10
  - Alfred Gager, 79, Austrian footballer (Austria Wien, Wacker Wien, national team) (b. 1942).
  - Friedrich Kurrent, 90, Austrian architect and author (b. 1931).
- January 11 – Herman Rechberger, 74, Austrian-born Finnish composer (b. 1947).
- January 19 – Elmar Fischer, 85, Austrian Roman Catholic prelate, bishop of Feldkirch (2005–2011), COVID-19 (b. 1936).
- January 20 – Karolos Trikolidis, 74, Austrian conductor (b. 1947).
- January 26 – Ernst Stankovski, 93, Austrian actor (To Be Without Worries, The Good Soldier Schweik, Help, I Love Twins) (b. 1928).
- January 27 – Karl Spiehs, 90, Austrian film producer (Dance with Me Into the Morning, Always Trouble with the Teachers, Cola, Candy, Chocolate) (b. 1931).
- January 28 – Brigitte Kowanz, 64, Austrian artist (b. 1957).

=== February ===
- February 1 – Walter Barylli, 100, Austrian violinist (b. 1921).
- February 7 – Gustav Ortner, 86, Austrian diplomat, ambassador to the Holy See (1997–2001) (b. 1935).
- February 8
  - Gerhard Roth, 79, Austrian writer (b. 1942).
  - Herbert Thalhammer, 66, Austrian politician (b. 1955).
- February 9
  - Joseph Horovitz, composer (Captain Noah and His Floating Zoo) and conductor (b. 1926).
  - Reinhard Schwabenitzky, 74, Austrian film director (Parole Chicago, Tour de Ruhr), producer and screenwriter (b. 1947).
- February 13 – Ferdinand Hueter, 62, Austrian politician (b. 1960).
- February 18 – Toni Stricker, 91, Austrian composer and violinist (b. 1930).
- February 25 – Eleonore Schönborn, 101, Austrian politician (b. 1920).
- February 28 – Hans Menasse, 91, Austrian footballer (First Vienna FC, national team) (b. 1930).

=== March ===
- March 1 – Alfred Mayer, 85, Austrian politician (b. 1936).
- March 3 – Josef Bauer, 88, Austrian artist (b. 1934).
- March 4 – Wilhelm Huberts, 84, Austrian football player (Grazer AK, Eintracht Frankfurt, national team) and manager (b. 1938).
- March 8
  - René Clemencic, 94, Austrian composer (b. 1928).
  - Maria Simon, 103, Austrian sociologist (b. 1918).
- March 13 – Erhard Busek, 80, Austrian politician, vice-chancellor (1991–1995) (b. 1941).
- March 17 – Christopher Alexander, 85, Austrian-born British-American architect and design theorist (b. 1936).
- March 18 – Alfons Dirnberger, 80, Austrian footballer (national team) (b. 1941).

=== April ===
- April 1 – Gerhard J. Woeginger, 57, Austrian mathematician (b. 1964).
- April 7 – Hellmuth Matiasek, 90, Austrian theatre director, theatre manager (Theater am Gärtnerplatz), and drama school president (Bayerische Theaterakademie August Everding) (b. 1931).
- April 8 – Mimi Reinhardt, 107, Austrian secretary (Oskar Schindler) (b. 1915).
- April 18 – Hermann Nitsch, 83, Austrian artist (Viennese Actionism) (b. 1938).
- April 21 – Renate Holm, 90, German-Austrian actress (The Count of Luxemburg) and operatic soprano (Vienna State Opera) (b. 1931).
- April 24 – Willi Resetarits, 73, Austrian singer, comedian, and human rights activist, fall (b. 1948).
- April 26 – Inge Bernstein, 91, Austrian-born English judge (b. 1931).
- April 27 – Maria L. Marcus, 88, Austrian-born American lawyer (b. 1933).

=== May ===
- May 4 – Albin Julius, 54, Austrian musician (Der Blutharsch) (b. 1967).
- May 13 – Rosmarie Trapp, 93, Austrian-born American singer (Trapp Family) (b. 1929).
- May 18 – Thomas Resetarits, 82, Austrian sculptor (b. 1939).

=== June ===
- June 4 – Frank Hoffmann, 83, German-Austrian actor (Ace of Aces, Derrick) (b. 1938).
- June 8 – Wolfgang Reisinger, 66, Austrian jazz percussionist, ruptured aneurysm (b. 1955).
- June 12 – Heidi Horten, 81, Austrian art collector (b. 1941).
- June 13 – Theresia Haidlmayr, 66, Austrian politician and disability rights activist, MP (1994–2008) (b. 1955).
- June 14 – Hermann Fillitz, 98, Austrian art historian (b. 1924).
- June 20
  - Kurt Equiluz, 93, Austrian operatic tenor (Vienna State Opera) (b. 1929).
  - Stefan Geosits, 94, Austrian Roman Catholic priest and historian (b. 1928).
- June 25 – Dietmar Streitler, 58, Austrian Olympic wrestler (1984) (b. 1964).
- June 26 – Hans Hollmann, 89, Austrian director and actor (b. 1933).

=== July ===
- July 4 – Robert Hoffmann, 82, Austrian actor (The Adventures of Robinson Crusoe, The Last Roman, The Sea Wolves) (b. 1939).
- July 13 – Sixtus Lanner, 88, Austrian politician, MP (1971–1996) (b. 1934).
- July 16 – Herbert W. Franke, 95, Austrian scientist and writer (b. 1927).
- July 17 – Ilona Graenitz, 79, Austrian politician, MP (1986–1995) and MEP (1995–1999) (b. 1943).
- July 20 – Alice Harnoncourt, 91, Austrian violinist (Concentus Musicus Wien) (b. 1930).
- July 22 – Stefan Soltész, 73, Hungarian-Austrian conductor (b. 1949).
- July 24 – Lotte Ingrisch, 92, Austrian author (b. 1930).

=== August ===
- August 7 – Gerd Kaminski, 79, Austrian legal scholar (b. 1942).
- August 19 – Egon Pajenk, 72, Austrian footballer (SK Rapid Wien, Admira, national team) (b. 1950).
- August 24 – Lily Renée, 101, Austrian-born American comic book artist (b. 1921).
- August 28 – Peter Stephan Zurbriggen, 79, Swiss Roman Catholic archbishop, apostolic nuncio to Austria (2009–2018) (b. 1943).

=== September ===
- September 15 – Alois Roppert, 88, Austrian politician, MP (1979–1994) (b. 1934).
- September 27 – Kurt Binder, 78, Austrian theoretical physicist (b. 1944).

=== October ===
- October 3 – Johann Müllner, 90, Austrian farmer and politician (b. 1932).
- October 4 – Felicitas Kuhn, 96, Austrian children's book illustrator (b. 1926).
- October 6 – Günter Vetter, 86, Austrian politician (b. 1936).
- October 13 – Dagmar Rom, 94, Austrian skier, Olympic silver medallist (1952) (b. 1928).
- October 16 – Josef Zemann, 99, Austrian mineralogist and geologist (b. 1923).
- October 17 – Peter Polleruhs, 72, Austrian engineer and politician, MP (1993–2002) (b. 1949).
- October 19 – Kassian Lauterer, 88, Austrian Roman Catholic priest, abbot of Wettingen-Mehrerau (1968–2009) and member of the Cistercians (since 1952) (b. 1934).
- October 22 – Dietrich Mateschitz, 78, Austrian businessman, co-founder of Red Bull GmbH (b. 1944).

=== November ===
- November 1 – Karl Svoboda, 92, Austrian politician, member of the Municipal Council and Landtag of Vienna (1979–1996) (b. 1929).
- November 4 – Alois Reicht, 94, Austrian politician, MP (1979–1988) (b. 1928).
- November 13 – Johanna Priglinger, 36, Austrian politician, member of the Landtag of Upper Austria (2013–2015) (b. 1986).
- November 16 – Gerhard Rodax, 57, Austrian footballer (Admira, Rapid Vienna, national team), hit by train (b.1965).
- November 22 – Peter Sternad, 76, Austrian Olympic hammer thrower (1972, 1976) (b. 1946).
- November 29 – Edmund Freibauer, 85, Austrian politician, president of the Landtag of Lower Austria (1998–2008) (b. 1937).
- November 30 – Christiane Hörbiger, 84, Austrian actress (The Major and the Bulls, Das Erbe der Guldenburgs, Julia – Eine ungewöhnliche Frau) (b. 1938).

=== December ===
- December 4 – Karl Merkatz, 92, Austrian actor (Ein echter Wiener geht nicht unter, Der Bockerer, Lethal Obsession) (b. 1930).
- December 9 – Fredrick Terna, 99, Austrian-born American painter and Holocaust survivor (b. 1923).
- December 12 – Josef Schagerl, 99, Austrian sculptor (b. 1923).
- December 13 – Ludwig Hoffmann-Rumerstein, 85, Austrian Roman Catholic official, lieutenant ad interim (2017) of the Sovereign Military Order of Malta (b. 1937).
- December 14 – Franz Kurzreiter, 78, Austrian politician, member of the Landtag of Lower Austria (1986–2003) (b. 1944).
- December 17
  - Elmar Kunauer, 82, Austrian Olympic sprinter (1960) (b.1940).
  - Albert Reichmann, Austrian-Canadian real estate executive (b. 1929).
- December 31 – Tom Karen, 96, Austrian-born British industrial designer (b. 1926).
