= Josef Bauer =

Josef Bauer may refer to:

- Josef Bauer (politician) (1915–1989), German politician of the Christian Social Union of Bavaria
- Josef Bauer (SS officer) (1881–1958), German politician, Nazi Party member and SS officer
- Josef Bauer (artist) (1934–2022), Austrian artist
