= Altötting (electoral district) =

Federal electoral district of Germany

Coordinates: 48°13′38″N 12°30′57″E

211 Altötting
- Electoral district for the Bundestag
- Altötting in 2025
- State: Bavaria
- Population: 227,400 (2019)
- Electorate: 168,656 (2021)
- Major settlements: Waldkraiburg; Mühldorf; Burghausen
- Area: 1,374.6 km^{2}

Current electoral district
- Created: 1949
- Party: CSU
- Member: Stephan Mayer
- Elected: 2002, 2005, 2009, 2013, 2017, 2021, 2025

Altötting is an electoral constituency (German: Wahlkreis) represented in the Bundestag. It elects one member via first-past-the-post voting. Under the current constituency numbering system, it is designated as constituency 211. It is located in southern Bavaria, comprising the districts of Altötting and Mühldorf.

Altötting was created for the inaugural 1949 federal election. Since 2002, it has been represented by Stephan Mayer of the Christian Social Union (CSU).

== Geography ==
Altötting is located in southern Bavaria. As of the 2021 federal election, it comprises the districts of Altötting and Mühldorf.

== History ==
Altötting was created in 1949. In the 1949 election, it was Bavaria constituency 1 in the numbering system. In the 1953 through 1961 elections, it was number 196. In the 1965 through 1976 elections, it was number 200. In the 1980 through 1998 elections, it was number 199. In the 2002 election, it was number 215. In the 2005 election, it was number 214. In the 2009 and 2013 elections, it was number 213. In the 2017 and 2021 elections, it was number 212. From the 2025 election, it has been number 211.

Originally, the constituency comprised the districts of Altötting, Mühldorf, and Wasserburg am Inn. In the 1976 election, it comprised the districts of Altötting, Mühldorf, and Erding. In the 1980 through 1994 elections, it comprised the districts of Altötting, Mühldorf, and Ebersberg. In the 1998 and 2002 elections, it comprised the districts of Altötting (excluding the Verwaltungsgemeinschaft of Kirchweidach), Mühldorf, and Ebersberg. It acquired its current borders in the 2005 election.

Election	No.	Name	Borders
1949	1	Altötting	Altötting district; Mühldorf district; Wasserburg am Inn district
1953	196	Altötting	Altötting district; Mühldorf district; Wasserburg am Inn district
1957	196	Altötting	Altötting district; Mühldorf district; Wasserburg am Inn district
1961	196	Altötting	Altötting district; Mühldorf district; Wasserburg am Inn district
1965	200	Altötting	Altötting district; Mühldorf district; Wasserburg am Inn district
1969	200	Altötting	Altötting district; Mühldorf district; Wasserburg am Inn district
1972	200	Altötting	Altötting district; Mühldorf district; Wasserburg am Inn district
1976	200	Altötting	Altötting district; Mühldorf district; Erding district
1980	199	Altötting	Altötting district; Mühldorf district; Ebersberg district
1983	199	Altötting	Altötting district; Mühldorf district; Ebersberg district
1987	199	Altötting	Altötting district; Mühldorf district; Ebersberg district
1990	199	Altötting	Altötting district; Mühldorf district; Ebersberg district
1994	199	Altötting	Altötting district; Mühldorf district; Ebersberg district
1998	199	Altötting	Altötting district (excluding Kirchweidach Verwaltungsgemeinschaft); Mühldorf district; Ebersberg district
2002	215	Altötting	Altötting district (excluding Kirchweidach Verwaltungsgemeinschaft); Mühldorf district; Ebersberg district
2005	214	Altötting	Altötting district; Mühldorf district
2009	213	Altötting	Altötting district; Mühldorf district
2013	213	Altötting	Altötting district; Mühldorf district
2017	212	Altötting	Altötting district; Mühldorf district
2021	212	Altötting	Altötting district; Mühldorf district
2025	211	Altötting	Altötting district; Mühldorf district

== Members ==
The constituency has been held by the Christian Social Union of Bavaria (CSU) during all but one Bundestag term since its creation. It was first represented by Georg Mayerhofer of the Bavaria Party (BP) from 1949 to 1953. Josef Bauer of the CSU was elected in 1953 and served until 1969. Valentin Dasch then served a single term. Karl-Heinz Spilker was representative from 1972 to 1994, followed by Josef Hollerith from 1994 to 2002. Stephan Mayer was elected in 2002, and re-elected in 2005, 2009, 2013, 2017, 2021, and 2025.

Election	Member	Party	%
1949	Georg Mayerhofer	BP	33.5
1953	Josef Bauer	CSU	45.8
1957	Josef Bauer	CSU	62.1
1961	Josef Bauer	CSU	64.4
1965	Josef Bauer	CSU	69.4
1969	Valentin Dasch	CSU	65.6
1972	Karl-Heinz Spilker	CSU	65.9
1976	Karl-Heinz Spilker	CSU	70.2
1980	Karl-Heinz Spilker	CSU	64.5
1983	Karl-Heinz Spilker	CSU	67.2
1987	Karl-Heinz Spilker	CSU	62.3
1990	Karl-Heinz Spilker	CSU	56.8
1994	Josef Hollerith	CSU	60.5
1998	Josef Hollerith	CSU	58.2
2002	Stephan Mayer	CSU	65.7
2005	Stephan Mayer	CSU	64.7
2009	Stephan Mayer	CSU	60.7
2013	Stephan Mayer	CSU	65.8
2017	Stephan Mayer	CSU	54.5
2021	Stephan Mayer	CSU	43.3
2025	Stephan Mayer	CSU	43.9

== Election results ==
=== 2025 election ===
Federal election (2025): Altötting
Notes:	Blue background denotes the winner of the electorate vote. Pink background denotes a candidate elected from their party list. Yellow background denotes an electorate win by a list member, or other incumbent. A ✓ or ✗ denotes status of any incumbent, win or lose respectively.						
Party	Candidate	Votes	%	±%	Party votes	%	±%
CSU	✓ Stephan Mayer	60,164	43.9	▲0.6	54,393	39.6	▲5.4
AfD	Andreas Anton Wahrlich	32,226	23.5	▲12.5	33,187	24.2	▲13.4
SPD	Jürgen Fernengel	11,870	8.7	▼2.7	11,493	8.4	▼5.8
Greens	Peter Biela	10,399	7.6	▼1.1	10,713	7.8	▼1.7
FW	Klaus Hamal	8,638	6.3	▼3.8	7,504	5.5	▼6.1
Left	Julia Weisenberger	5,867	4.3	▲1.8	6,212	4.5	▲2.4
FDP	Sandra Maria Bubendorfer-Licht	4,037	2.9	▼4.2	4,887	3.6	▼6.8
BSW					4,548	3.3	
ÖDP	Martin Ludwig Antwerpen	2,187	1.6	▼0.4	839	0.6	▼0.4
dieBasis	Hans Josef Schiffbahn	1,580	1.2	▼1.6	800	0.6	▼1.7
Tierschutzpartei					1,057	0.8	▼0.3
Volt					550	0.4	▲0.2
die PARTEI					501	0.4	▼0.3
BP					340	0.2	▼0.4
BD					114	0.1	
Humanists					88	0.1	
MLPD					28	0.0	
Informal votes		743			457		
Total valid votes		136,968			137,254		
Turnout		137,711	82.0	▲5.2			
CSU hold	Majority	27,938	20.4	▼11.5			

=== 2021 election ===
Federal election (2021): Altötting
Notes:	Blue background denotes the winner of the electorate vote. Pink background denotes a candidate elected from their party list. Yellow background denotes an electorate win by a list member, or other incumbent. A ✓ or ✗ denotes status of any incumbent, win or lose respectively.						
Party	Candidate	Votes	%	±%	Party votes	%	±%
CSU	✓ Stephan Mayer	55,693	43.3	▼11.2	44,060	34.2	▼9.8
SPD	Annette Heidrich	14,620	11.4	▼1.0	18,309	14.2	▲1.9
AfD	Klaus Lang	14,220	11.1	▼2.1	13,940	10.8	▼3.7
FW	Ilse Ertl	13,049	10.1		14,857	11.5	▲9.0
Greens	Christoph Arz	11,145	8.7	▲2.6	12,248	9.5	▲2.7
FDP	Sandra Bubendorfer-Licht	9,245	7.2	▲1.6	13,298	10.3	▲1.4
dieBasis	Edgar Siemund	3,509	2.7		3,003	2.3	
Left	Sebastian Misselhorn	3,155	2.5	▼2.4	2,769	2.1	▼3.1
Tierschutzpartei					1,395	1.1	▲0.2
ÖDP	Bernhard Suttner	2,509	2.0	▼0.9	1,302	1.0	▼0.3
BP	Simon Wahl	1,416	1.1		881	0.7	▼0.7
PARTEI					872	0.7	0.0
Pirates					389	0.3	0.0
Team Todenhöfer					334	0.3	
Unabhängige					222	0.2	
Volt					196	0.2	
Gesundheitsforschung					165	0.1	0.0
NPD					103	0.1	▼0.2
V-Partei3					106	0.1	▼0.1
Humanists					94	0.1	
Bündnis C					55	0.0	
du.					53	0.0	
The III. Path					50	0.0	
LKR					24	0.0	
MLPD					19	0.0	0.0
DKP					15	0.0	0.0
Informal votes		880			681		
Total valid votes		128,561			128,760		
Turnout		129,441	76.7	▲1.4			
CSU hold	Majority	41,073	31.9	▼9.5			

=== 2017 election ===
Federal election (2017): Altötting
Notes:	Blue background denotes the winner of the electorate vote. Pink background denotes a candidate elected from their party list. Yellow background denotes an electorate win by a list member, or other incumbent. A ✓ or ✗ denotes status of any incumbent, win or lose respectively.						
Party	Candidate	Votes	%	±%	Party votes	%	±%
CSU	✓ Stephan Mayer	68,435	54.5	▼11.3	55,417	44.0	▼14.6
AfD	Oliver Multusch	16,486	13.1	▲9.8	18,330	14.6	▲10.5
SPD	Annette Heidrich	15,479	12.3	▼2.0	15,511	12.3	▼2.8
Greens	Peter Uldahl	7,584	6.0	▲0.6	8,608	6.8	▲1.1
FDP	Sandra Bubendorfer-Licht (Note: Bubendorfer-Licht entered the Bundestag on the FDP list after the resignation of Jimmy Schulz in December 2019.)	7,070	5.6	▲3.6	11,209	8.9	▲5.0
Left	Erich Utz	6,060	4.8	▲2.3	6,659	5.3	▲2.4
FW					3,172	2.5	▼0.1
BP					1,718	1.4	0.0
ÖDP	Elisabeth Sieber	3,637	2.9		1,685	1.3	▲0.1
Tierschutzpartei					1,078	0.9	▲0.2
PARTEI					814	0.6	
Pirates					422	0.3	▼1.4
NPD					295	0.2	▼0.4
DM					216	0.2	
V-Partei³					185	0.1	
Gesundheitsforschung					176	0.1	
BüSo	Franz Maier	787	0.6	▲0.3	136	0.1	0.0
BGE					130	0.1	
DiB					127	0.1	
MLPD					13	0.0	0.0
DKP					9	0.0	
Informal votes		1,248			876		
Total valid votes		125,538			125,910		
Turnout		126,786	75.4	▲8.5			
CSU hold	Majority	51,949	41.4	▼10.0			

=== 2013 election ===
Federal election (2013): Altötting
Notes:	Blue background denotes the winner of the electorate vote. Pink background denotes a candidate elected from their party list. Yellow background denotes an electorate win by a list member, or other incumbent. A ✓ or ✗ denotes status of any incumbent, win or lose respectively.						
Party	Candidate	Votes	%	±%	Party votes	%	±%
CSU	✓ Stephan Mayer	72,915	65.8	▲5.0	64,998	58.6	▲6.8
SPD	Annette Heidrich	15,921	14.4	▼0.7	16,797	15.2	▲1.8
Greens	Sofie Voit	6,030	5.4	▼2.2	6,394	5.8	▼2.3
FW	Andreas Altmann	3,841	3.5		2,884	2.6	
AfD	Lorenz Kreft	3,669	3.3		4,496	4.1	
Left	Alexander Lebedew	2,832	2.6	▼2.3	3,241	2.9	▼2.1
Pirates	Frank Zimmermann	2,318	2.1		1,902	1.7	0.0
FDP	Ullrich Kastner	2,293	2.1	▼6.5	4,365	3.9	▼8.6
REP					541	1.5	▼0.5
BP					1,485	1.3	▲0.2
ÖDP					1,349	1.2	▼0.1
Tierschutzpartei					759	0.7	▲0.1
NPD					702	0.6	▼0.6
DIE VIOLETTEN		654	0.6		350	0.3	▲0.1
DIE FRAUEN					213	0.2	
Party of Reason					136	0.1	
BüSo		388	0.3	▼0.9	116	0.1	▼0.2
PRO					79	0.1	
RRP					39	0.0	▼0.6
MLPD					15	0.0	0.0
Informal votes		985			985		
Total valid votes		110,861			110,861		
Turnout		111,846	66.9	▼0.6			
CSU hold	Majority	56,994	51.4	▲5.8			

=== 2009 election ===
Federal election (2009): Altötting
Notes:	Blue background denotes the winner of the electorate vote. Pink background denotes a candidate elected from their party list. Yellow background denotes an electorate win by a list member, or other incumbent. A ✓ or ✗ denotes status of any incumbent, win or lose respectively.						
Party	Candidate	Votes	%	±%	Party votes	%	±%
CSU	✓ Stephan Mayer	67,284	60.7	▼4.0	57,712	51.9	▼6.4
SPD	Werner Groß	16,724	15.1	▼5.3	14,831	13.3	▼6.8
FDP	Raffaela Bubendorfer	9,508	8.6	▲4.1	13,992	12.6	▲4.1
Greens	Peter Uldahl	8,477	7.7	▲2.4	8,923	8.0	▲2.4
Left	Christian Peiker	5,362	4.8	▲2.4	5,641	5.1	▲2.4
Pirates					1,896	1.7	
ÖDP					1,517	1.4	
NPD	Markus Fridgen	2,045	1.8	0.0	1,347	1.2	▼0.1
BP					1,297	1.2	▲0.4
REP					1,086	1.0	▼0.3
FAMILIE					789	0.7	▲0.1
RRP					720	0.6	
Tierschutzpartei					650	0.6	
BüSo	Franz Maier	1,369	1.2	▲0.4	309	0.3	▲0.1
DIE VIOLETTEN					251	0.2	
CM					143	0.1	
PBC					99	0.1	0.0
DVU					63	0.1	
MLPD					20	0.0	0.0
Informal votes		1,738			1,221		
Total valid votes		110,769			111,286		
Turnout		112,507	67.5	▼7.7			
CSU hold	Majority	50,560	45.6	▲1.3			

=== 2005 election ===
Federal election (2005): Altötting
Notes:	Blue background denotes the winner of the electorate vote. Pink background denotes a candidate elected from their party list. Yellow background denotes an electorate win by a list member, or other incumbent. A ✓ or ✗ denotes status of any incumbent, win or lose respectively.						
Party	Candidate	Votes	%	±%	Party votes	%	±%
CSU	✓ Stephan Mayer	73,539	64.7	▼5.4	17,871	58.3	▼11.3
SPD	Bastian Höcketstaller	25,111	20.4	▼1.0	24,770	20.1	▲1.3
Greens	George Gafus	6,451	5.2	▲1.0	6,894	5.6	▲0.7
FDP	Konrad Kammergruber	5,514	4.5	▲1.5	10,413	8.4	▲4.9
Left	Stefan Heider	3,006	2.4	▲1.6	3,328	2.7	▲2.2
NPD	Johann Unterstaller	2,280	1.9		1,666	1.4	▲1.1
REP					1,528	1.2	▲0.3
BüSo	Franz Maier	1,020	0.8	▲0.8	271	0.2	▲0.2
BP					971	0.8	▲0.6
Familie					720	0.6	
GRAUEN					381	0.3	▲0.2
Feminist					266	0.2	▲0.1
PBC					151	0.1	▲0.1
MLPD					52	0.0	0.0
Informal votes		1,947			1,586		
Total valid votes		122,921			123,282		
Turnout		124,868	75.1	▼5.2			
CSU hold	Majority	54,428	44.3				
