= Dasch =

Dasch is a German surname. Notable people with the surname include:

- Annette Dasch (born 1976), German opera singer
- George John Dasch (1903–1992), German World War II spy
- Valentin Dasch (1930–1981), German politician
