= André Heller =

Austrian artist, author, singer and actor

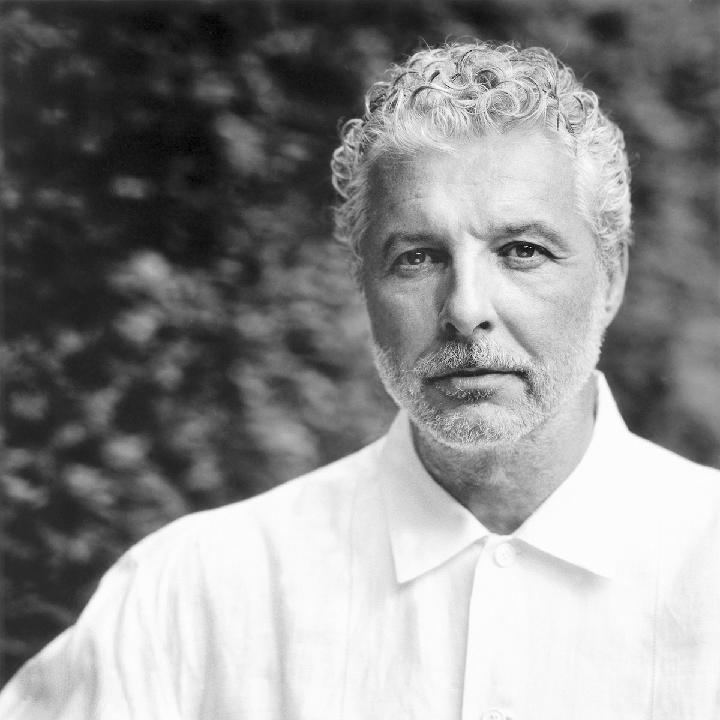
- Heller in 2006

Background information
- Labels: Amadeo, BASF, United Artists, Intercord

Franz André Heller (German pronunciation: [fʁant͡s anˈdʁeː ˈhεlɐ]; born 22 March 1947 as Francis Charles Georges Jean André Heller-Hueart) is an Austrian artist, author, poet, singer, songwriter, and actor.

== Biography ==
Heller was born in Vienna into a wealthy Jewish family of sweets manufacturers, Gustav & Wilhelm Heller. His parents were Stephan Heller (1895–1958) and Elisabeth Heller (1914–2018). He visited Café Hawelka almost daily. It was in this coffeehouse that he met many men of letters including Friedrich Torberg, H. C. Artmann, and occasionally Elias Canetti, as well as Hans Weigel, and Helmut Qualtinger, with whom he later on collaborated and performed. He took acting classes from Hans Weigel and his cohabitee Elfriede Ott.

=== Theatre, radio, television, songs ===
Heller has been writing prose, poetry, and songs since 1964. He left school shortly before obtaining the Matura, (he went to a Jesuit boarding school). From 1965 to 1967, he was a moderately successful actor at various Viennese avant-garde theatres.

=== Public figure ===
In 1967, Heller co-founded Ö3, the ORF's then-progressive pop music station, where he was one of the hosts of the daily Musicbox programme. That same year, he recorded his first LP record with the title Nr1 that was released in 1970. His second LP called, Platte was released in 1971, and, subsequently, his first play premiered entitled, King-Kong-King-Mayer–Mayer–Ling at Vienna Festival in 1972.

=== Chansonnier ===
As a poet songwriter, his work spans across a period of more than 15 years selecting diverse topics and writing for a German-speaking audience. He has worked with not only international names such as Ástor Piazzolla, Dino Saluzzi, and Freddie Hubbard, but also with Austrian artists such as Toni Stricker, Wolfgang Ambros, and Helmut Qualtinger. Heller's own poetry has been set to music. He has also sung texts by other authors. For instance, "Catherine", from 1970, was set to one of the first hits of Heller. The text came from the then still largely unknown Reinhard Mey, and the music from the Austro-Canadian Jack Grunsky. With Werner Schneyder, he created Viennese German songs that are translated from Jacques Brel, such as "Franz" (after the Brel title "Jef"). Using intimate memories of traumatic childhood experiences, and insights into his life, as well as his Catholic-Jewish origin, he created songs with the title "Angstlied" (Verwunschen, 1980). Titles like "Miruna, die Riesin von Göteborg" (Verwunschen, 1980) are, in turn, influenced by the Vienna School of Fantastic Realism. "Das Lied vom idealen Park" (Narrenlieder 1985), or, as a duet with Wolfgang Ambros, he also introduced the Bob Dylan cover, "Für immer jung" (Stimmenhören, 1983), are now titles that are part of the Austro-pop cannon. In 1983, he appeared on Stimmenhören with the song "Erhebet euch Geliebte", a song at the time of the peace movement in the early 1980s. Since the early 1980s, he turned increasingly to large public productions, installations and performances, until 1982, where his concert career came to close. In 1985, the album, Narrenlieder, was released. Between 1967 and 1985, he published a total of fourteen LPs, twelve of those were gold records, and earned him seven times platinum. In 1991, he wrote, looking back on this period:

I started in 1967, to put my poems together using my voice on record and in recitals before millions of people. This was following the example of Bob Dylan's first meaningful and self-published poetry ... 1982 was certainly the zenith of that career, where I had to stop my concerts. I realized at this point, it was spoiled for me, because at 8 pm, I had to act gifted in front of a few thousand listeners, just because they had paid for admission. – Heller in the liner notes of Kritische Gesamtausgabe published in 1991.

However, on his 60th birthday, Heller gave a concert in April 2007 at the Viennese Radiokulturhaus, after twenty-five years of absence from the stage in a recital entitled, Konzert für mich (Concert for me).

Between 1968 and 1983, Heller recorded 15 albums as a singer of his own texts, and in part of his own compositions. He was on the road with 9 international concert tours, and was the host and entertainer in 12 evening-filling TV shows.

In 2006, thanks to the initiative of Chris Gelbmann, he released his last album called, Ruf und Echo. The 3-CD compendium is the first release in the past 20 years, containing new songs, and interpretations of old hits by artists like Brian Eno, Xavier Naidoo, Thomas D, and The Walkabouts.

=== Cultural manager ===
Heller was appointed as an Artistic Director of the Artistic and Cultural Programme that ran parallel to the 2006 FIFA World Cup in Germany. His company, Artevent, was also responsible for the presentation of the Germany bid for the 2006 FIFA World Cup project. He designed the final presentation in 2000 for the successful West German application, and, in 2003, designed a "Fußball-Globus", an architectural project consisting of a huge lit-up football globe that toured through Germany standing in public places such as Brandenburg Gate in Berlin. Heller invented the motto for the Football World Cup, Die Welt zu Gast bei Freunden (A time to make friends).

For the World Cup, Heller planned an opening gala in Berlin's Olympic Stadium, where Brian Eno, and Peter Gabriel would be involved. On 13 January 2006, it was canceled by FIFA. The reason cited was that the turf, which would have been re-installed after the end of the gala, would not be in perfect condition for the first game there.

In 2017 he curated the grand reopening of the Weltmuseum Wien at Vienna's Heldenplatz, featuring artists from around the globe and attracting an audience of more than 7,500.

=== Actor ===
From 1976 until 1981, Heller played major roles in various international movies.

In the late 1960s, Heller joined as a financier in the film, Moos auf den Steinen, with Erika Pluhar in one of the main roles, for which he claims to have used up his inheritance. It was not long before he was in front the camera as an actor: Heller played roles in Hans-Jürgen Syberberg's Hitler: A Film from Germany, in Fear Not, Jacob! by Radu Gabrea, in Doktor Faustus by Franz Seitz, and in Peter Schamoni's Frühlingssinfonie, in Maximilian Schell's 1979 film, Geschichten aus dem Wienerwald, which is based on Ödön von Horváth's play. In 1969, Heller participated in a televised version of Arthur Schnitzler's tragicomedy, Das weite Land, directed by Peter Beauvais. In 1989, he also worked as a stamp artist; on behalf of the United Nations Postal Administration, he designed a stamp to commemorate UN Vienna's tenth anniversary.

=== Publications ===
Heller has received numerous international awards. He has to date written 14 printed publications, among them are collections of stories Die Ernte der Schlaflosigkeit in Wien, Auf und Davon, Schlamassel, and Als ich ein Hund war, the novel Schattentaucher, and the collection of poems Sitzt ana und glaubt, er is zwa (with Helmut Qualtinger), as well as two picture books Jagmandir – Traum und Wirklichkeit, and Die Zaubergärten des André Heller. 21 TV documentaries have been produced about Heller's projects, productions, and plans. These were done by the likes of Werner Herzog, Syberberg, and Elsa Klensch, among others.

=== Private life ===
Heller was married from 1970 to 1984 to the actress, singer, and author Erika Pluhar. For some years, he lived in the 1970s with the actress Gertraud Jesserer, and much later, with the actress Andrea Eckert. Heller was romantically involved for short periods in the mid-1980s with Anke Kesselaar, Rudi Carrell's former wife.

Heller lives in an apartment in the Palais Windisch-Graetz in Vienna's Innere Stadt quarter that is owned by the Augustinian monastery of Klosterneuburg. In 2000, Heller received, there, the then German Chancellor Gerhard Schröder. Heller lives temporarily in the Giardino Botanico in Gardone Riviera. He currently lives with the former model Albina Schmid in Vienna, and travels the world. He has one son, Ferdinand, who goes under the stage name "Left Boy" for his music.

== Performances, installations, stage designs ==
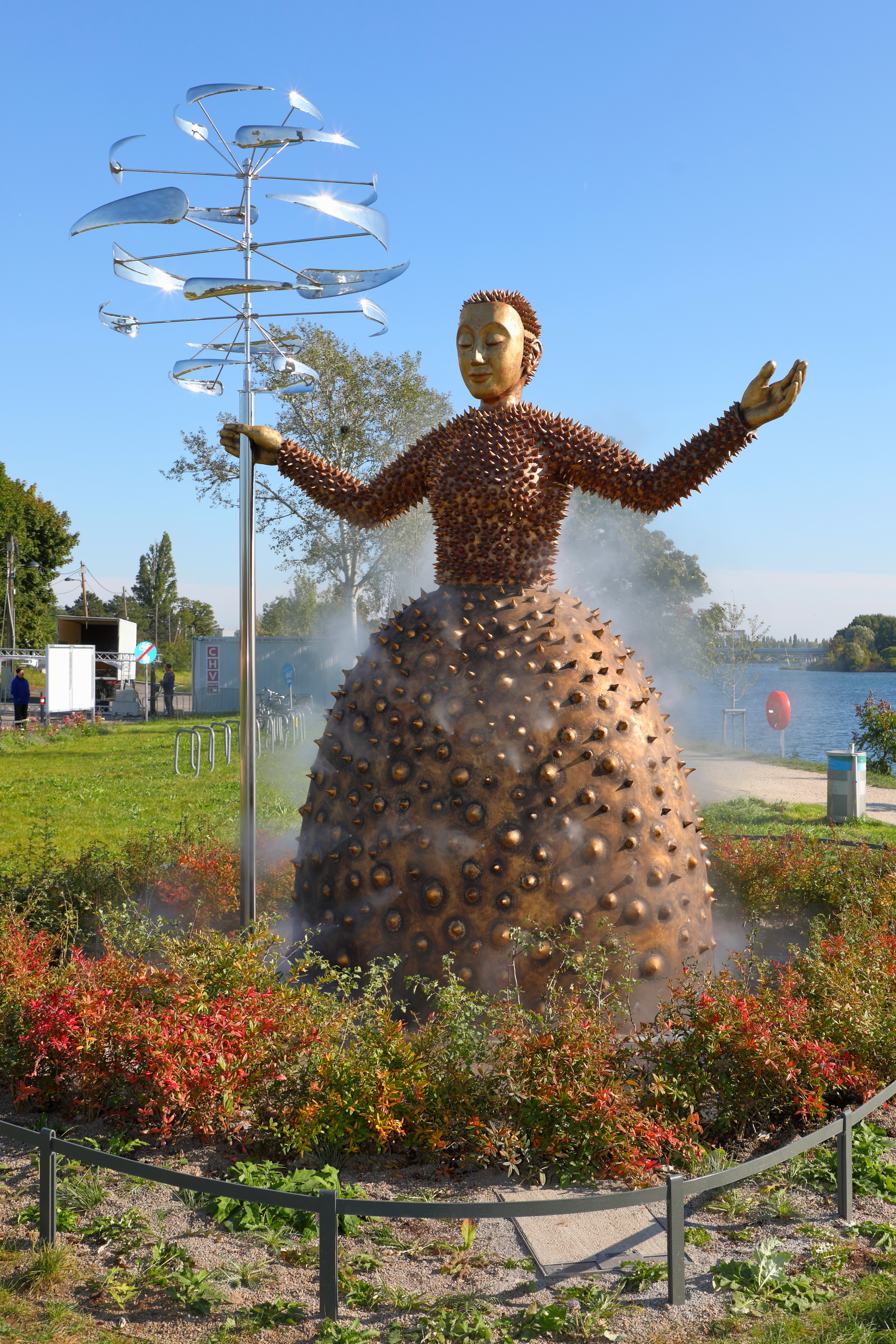
„Die Wasserwächterin“ in Bank-Austria-Park in Vienna (2025)

- 1981 – Flic Flac, a poetic music hall performance as part of the Vienna Festival the tour through Europe
- 1983 – The Pyro-Poem of Theater des Feuers (Teatro de Fogo) modeled on baroque light and color games held in Lisbon. Heller financed this spectacle from his own pocket that almost put him on the brink of bankruptcy.
- 1984 – Sturz durch Träume a fire show before the Reichstag building in Berlin attracts 650 000 paying spectators
- 1984 – Feuertheater mit Klangwolke in front of the Berlin Reichstag
- 1985 – Misstraue der Idylle for the Bundesgartenschau in Berlin, Heller created a floral painting from 40,000 plants.
- 1985 – Begnadete Körper had its premiere on 2 November, in the Deutsches Theater in Munich. Great masters of the acrobatics schools in Anhui and Beijing tour through Europe. Heller was the first non-Chinese artist to be allowed to work with Chinese master acrobats and to present their refined skills to the West.
- 1986 – In Graz, Heller created a Dichtergarten (poetry garden) where he had a core set of important writers create poems with flower shapes
- 1986 – Himmelszeichen hot air balloon sculptures that are celestial signs floating above the skies of London, Munich, Venice, Oslo, New York, Moscow, San Francisco and across the Niagara Falls.
- 1986 – Salut für Olga The show sought a revival of vaudeville arts
- 1987 – Luna Luna, staged in Hamburg, was Heller's Festival of Modern Art. Numerous well-known contemporary artists participated, including Jean-Michel Basquiat, Roy Lichtenstein, Salvador Dalí, Joseph Beuys, Keith Haring, Friedensreich Hundertwasser and Jim Whiting.
- 1987 – Lachen Machen Clown Parade
- 1988 – Body and Soul, a show of black American heritage stage show with musicians, singers, dancers, and grotesque comedy artists from Harlem, Mubale, and New Orleans; tour through New York and Europe. (Spirituals, New Orleans jazz, ragtime, bebop, sandshoe, blues, soul, scat, tap dancing)
- 1988 – Giardino Botanico Fondazione André Heller Acquisition of Fondazione André Heller in Gardone Riviera, Italy, approximately 10.000 m^{2} botanical gardens
- 1989 – Chinese National Circus
- 1991 – Jagmandir, the eccentric private theater of the Maharana of Udaipur, India
- 1991 – Sinking Giant flower sculpture and fountain Versinkende Riesin in the gardens of Schönbrunn Palace, Vienna
- 1991 – Wonderhouse at the Broadhurst Theatre on Broadway in New York City
- 1992 – Bamboo Man a 55-meter-high sculpture floating in the harbor of Hong Kong
- 1992 – Wintergarten-Varieté with Bernhard Paul, inauguration of the theatre-building in Berlin, Germany
- 1995 – Swarovski Crystal Worlds Heller designed in Wattens, Tyrol
- 1996 – Brockhaus Enzyklopädie 2000 design of the 24-volume deluxe edition of this encyclopedia for the 20th edition (also: Millennium Edition)
- 1997 – Boat of Salt in the Dead Sea in Israel
- 1997 – The Dumb Prophet, a light sculpture in Aït Benhaddou, Morocco
- 1997 – Yumé – Flight through dreams a Japanese kaleidoscope, Tokyo and European tour
- 1998 – Meteorit a place of amazement, wonder chambers on the Energy theme for the Rheinisch-Westfälische Elektrizitätswerk, Essen, Germany
- 1998 – Anima Planning for an animal park on a former Krupp site in Bochum (not implemented)
- 1999 – Voices of God an event with spiritual singers, musicians, and dancers from 12 cultures, Marrakesh, Morocco
- 2000 – Der Erdgeist, a 14-meter-high sculpture, half-man, half bird, watches over the pavilion's Living Planet Square, the World Wide Fund for Nature at the Expo
- 2002 – In The Heart of Light – Night of The Prima Donnas: A poetic documentation of a myth conceived and produced by André Heller and adapted for the screen by Pepe Danquart
- 2002 – Foreboding/La Voix Humaine. The Théâtre du Châtelet in Paris was the venue for the staging of "Anticipation / La Voix Humaine", a cooperation between André Heller and Jessye Norman in October 2002.
- 2003 – Football Globe the architectural herald for the 2006 FIFA World Cup in Germany; one tour in Germany, one tour internationally (Tokyo, Paris, Milan, Zurich)
- 2004 – Jessye Norman, a documentary by André Heller and Othmar Schmiderer
- 2005 – Afrika! Afrika! African music, dance and acrobat show (performing 2005 until at least 2009)
- 2006 – Opening Ceremony of the 2006 FIFA World Cup
- 2007 – Extension of the Swarovski Crystal Worlds.
- 2011 – Magnifico a fantastic horse show, showing a kaleidoscope of fairy tale scenes around the horse motif
- 2015 – Opening of the 'Al Noor Insel' in Sharjah commissioned by Shurooq, the Sharjah Investment and Development Authority, in the United Arab Emirates.
- 2016 – Opening of the 'Anima Garden' southeast of Marrakesh near Ourika.
- 2017 – Inauguration of the "Weingöttin" (Vine Goddess), at the Castle of Taggenbrunn, at the vineyard of Andrea and Alfred Riedl.
- 2017 – New design of one room named "Heroes of Peace" in the Swarovski Crystal Worlds.
- 2017 – Grand Reopening of the Weltmuseum Wien in Vienna
- 2025 - 'Remassuri‘, a 75-minute show about Viennese music, together with Ernst Molden and Ursula Strauss

== Works ==
- King Kong King Mayer-Ling – ein Stück Theater, opening premiere of the Vienna Festival, Austria
- Sein und Schein – play, premiered in 1993 at the Burgtheater in Vienna
- Im toten Winkel – documentary about Hitler's secretary Traudl Junge, won the Panorama Audience Award for the Berlinale 2002
- Scheitern, scheitern, besser scheitern a conversation between Gert Voss and Harald Schmidt

=== Writing ===
- Sie nennen mich den Messerwerfer (TBV Fischer 1974)
- Die Ernte der Schlaflosigkeit in Wien – illustrated book (Goldmann 1975)
- Auf und davon (Hoffmann and Campe, 1979)
- Die Sprache der Salamander – Songs 1971–1981 (Hoffmann and Campe, 1981)
- Flic Flac – A vaudeville poetic photographs by Stefan Moses – pictorial (Ullstein, 1982)
- Wallfahrten zum Allerheiligsten der Phantasie (Henschel Verlag 1990)
- Schlamassel (S. Fischer, 1993)
- Brockhaus-Enzyklopädie 2000 – Shaping the 24-volume luxury edition (1998)
- Bilderleben – Öffentliches & Privates – pictorial (dvdrip 2000)
- Als ich ein Hund war (Yale University Press 2001)
- Schattentaucher(dvdrip 2003)
- Wie ich lernte, bei mir selbst Kind zu sein: Eine Erzählung (How I learned to be with my child self) A narrative story based on his childhood, youth at a Jesuit boarding school, (S. Fischer, 2008)

== Discography ==
- Die frühen Jahre (1966–1969)
- No. 1 (1970)
- Platte (1971)
- Das war André Heller (1972)
- Neue Lieder (1973)
- A Musi A Musi (1974)
- Bei lebendigem Leib (live, 1975)
- Abendland (1976)
- Basta (1978)
- Bitter und Süß (1978)
- Ausgerechnet Heller (1979)
- Heurige und gestrige Lieder (with Helmut Qualtinger, 1979)
- Verwunschen (1980)
- Stimmenhören (1983)
- Narrenlieder (1985)
- Liebeslieder (1989)
- Kritische Gesamtausgabe 1967–1991 (1991)
- Ruf und Echo (2003)
- Bestheller 1967–2007 (2008)
- Spätes Leuchten (2019)

== Awards ==
- 1986 – Bambi Award
- 1993 – Berlin Bär (BZ-Culture Award)
- 2004 – Amadeus Austrian Music Award for Ruf und Echo
- 2004 – André Heller was elected to the list of 50 most important Austrians over the past 50 years with a readership survey from the daily Kurier.
- 2011 – Romy for Scheitern, Scheitern, besser Scheitern, Best Documentary TV
- 2011 – Raimund-Ring
