= Alois Reicht =

Austrian postbeamter and politician (1928–2022)

Member of the National Council of Austria
- In office 8 October 1979 – 25 November 1988

Personal details
- Born: 25 April 1928 Trautmannsdorf in Oststeiermark, Austria
- Died: 4 November 2022 (aged 94) Gralla, Austria
- Party: SPÖ
- Occupation: Postbeamter

Alois Reicht (25 April 1928 – 4 November 2022) was an Austrian postbeamter and politician. A member of the Social Democratic Party, he served in the National Council from 1979 to 1988.

Reicht died in Gralla on 4 November 2022, at the age of 94.
