= Münchendorf derailment =

2022 Rail accident in Austria

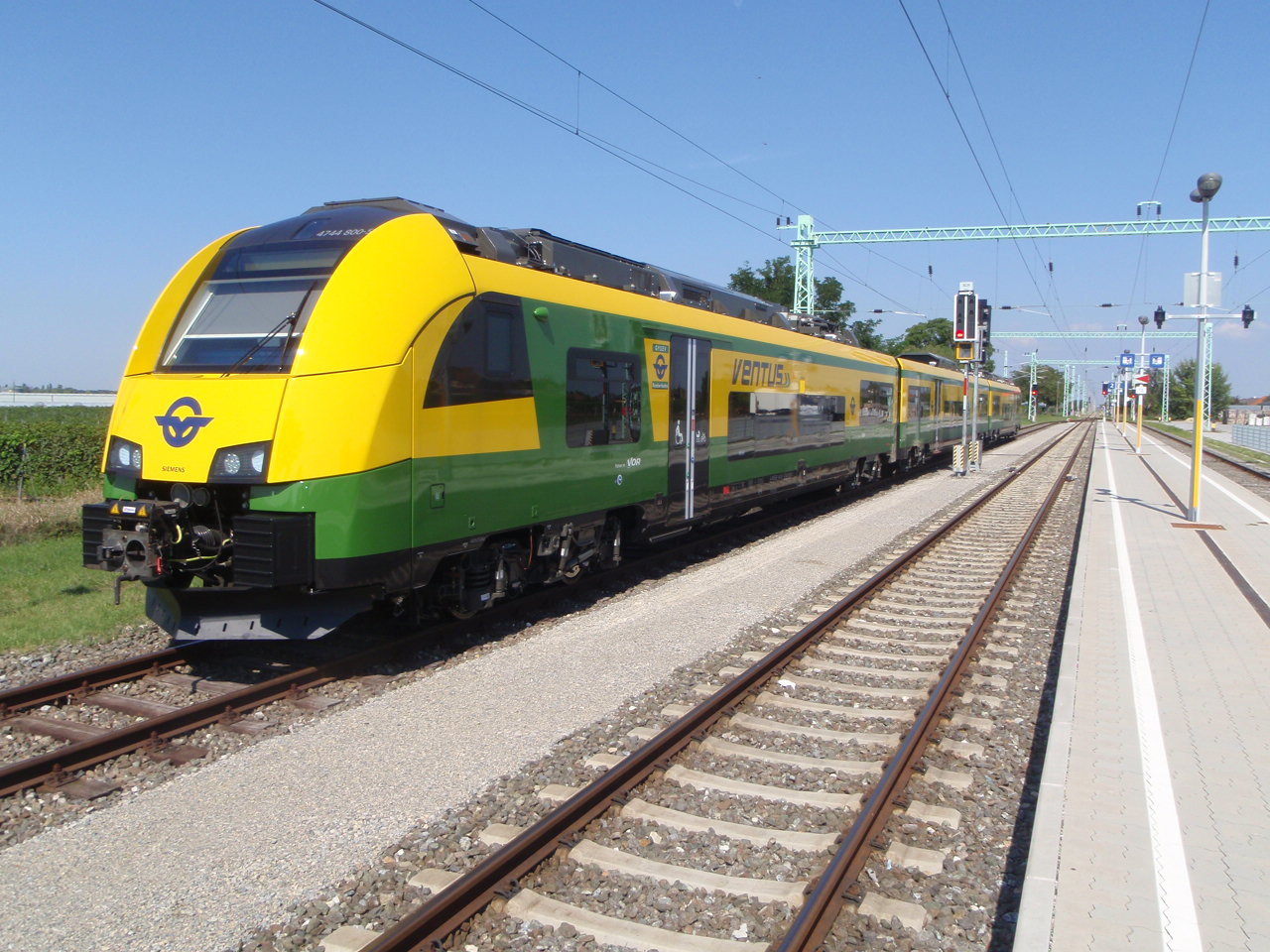
- A GySEV Ventus train, similar to that involved in the accident

Details
- Date: 9 May 2022; ~18:00 local time (16:00 UTC)
- Location: Münchendorf
- Country: Austria
- Line: Pottendorfer line
- Operator: Raaberbahn (train); ÖBB Infra (railway line)
- Incident type: Derailment
- Cause: Under investigation

Statistics
- Trains: 1
- Passengers: 56
- Crew: 1
- Deaths: 1
- Injured: 13

On 9 May 2022, a passenger train derailed near Münchendorf, in the Mödling district of Lower Austria, Austria. One person was killed.

== Accident ==
The accident occurred shortly after 18:00 local time (16:00 UTC). A passenger train comprising two Siemens Desiro ML Ventus electric multiple units derailed near Münchendorf, in the Mödling district of Lower Austria, Austria. The Raaberbahn train was travelling from Deutschkreutz via Vienna to Bratislava, Slovakia on the Pottendorf line which is operated by ÖBB Infra. Unit 4746-311 was leading. All six carriages were derailed, with two of them ending up on their sides alongside the railway. Of the 57 people on the train, one was killed and thirteen were injured, two seriously.

The alarm was raised at 18:27, with the Achau, Guntramsdorf and Münchendorf fire brigades attending the scene. The train driver was cut from the wreckage. Four helicopters were sent to the site. This was the first fatal rail accident in Austria since a collision at Niklasdorf in 2018.

It was reported that the train had gone through a set of points at more than 100 kilometres per hour (62 mph), almost double the speed limit.
