= Norman Marcus =

American lawyer (1932–2008)

- Born: August 31, 1932; New York City, U.S.
- Died: June 30, 2008 (aged 75); New York City, U.S.
- Education: Columbia College (BA); Yale Law School (JD)
- Occupation: Lawyer
- Employer: New York City Planning Commission (1963–1985)
- Spouse: Maria L. Marcus

Norman Marcus (August 31, 1932 – June 30, 2008) was an American lawyer and zoning expert. He served as general counsel of the New York City Planning Commission for over twenty years and played a key role in designing zoning laws to preserve the historic integrity of New York City's old neighborhoods while allowing for new development.

== Biography ==
Marcus was born on August 31, 1932, in The Bronx. He graduated from Columbia College in 1953 and Yale Law School in 1957. At Yale, he met his wife, Maria Eleanor Lenhoff, who became Joseph M. McLaughlin professor of law at Fordham University, and the two married in 1956.

Marcus joined the New York City Planning Commission in 1963 and for 20 years was its general counsel. In that capacity, Marcus devised legal codes that helped transfer air rights above historic Broadway theaters in Theater District, Manhattan and above Grand Central Terminal, preserving their historic architecture while allowing construction of new skyscrapers. He also pioneered inclusionary zoning, which offers tax breaks to developers of luxury housing if they set aside a portion of their building for low-to-middle income tenants.

Marcus helped draft the 1982 Loft Law, which legalized artists' occupation of old warehouses in manufacturing districts and their transformation into work spaces and residential apartments by protecting them from rising rents, poor conditions, and eviction.

After leaving the commission in 1985 after a 22-year career, Marcus taught zoning laws at New York University, the Cardozo School of Law, Pratt Institute and the Princeton University School of Architecture.

Marcus died of cancer on June 30, 2008.
