= Jag Mandir (film) =

1991 film

- Written by: Werner Herzog
- Directed by: Werner Herzog
- Starring: André Heller; Arvind Singh Mewar
- Narrated by: Werner Herzog
- Country of origin: Germany
- Original language: German

Production
- Producer: Werner Herzog
- Cinematography: Rainer Klausmann; Wolfgang Dickmann; Anton Peschke
- Editor: Michou Hutter
- Running time: 85 minutes

Original release
- Release: 1991

Jag Mandir, sometimes known by its subtitle, The Eccentric Private Theatre of the Maharaja of Udaipur (German: Das excentrische Privattheater des Maharadscha von Udaipur), is a 1991 documentary film directed for television by Werner Herzog. The bulk of the film consists of footage of an elaborate theatrical performance for the Maharaj Arvind Singh Mewar at the City Palace of Udaipur, Rajasthan staged by André Heller.

== Production ==
The film was made at Heller's request. Heller explains in the film that he sent several colleagues throughout India to find performers for the show, including dancers, musicians, contortionists, and magicians. About 10,000 performers were located, and of these about 2,000 were chosen to appear in the show, which lasted several hours on a single day. Herzog's footage was filmed at the actual show, with some segments filmed in the rehearsals in the previous days.

Herzog's narration explains that the event was requested of the Maharana by a local wise man who saw the sinking of the city's palaces into the Pichola Lake as a sign that the local culture was deteriorating, and that the Maharana needed to stage the performance to reinvigorate interest in the various cultures represented. This story was invented by Herzog for the film, to "put it all into some context."
