= Trautmannsdorf in Oststeiermark =

- Former municipality
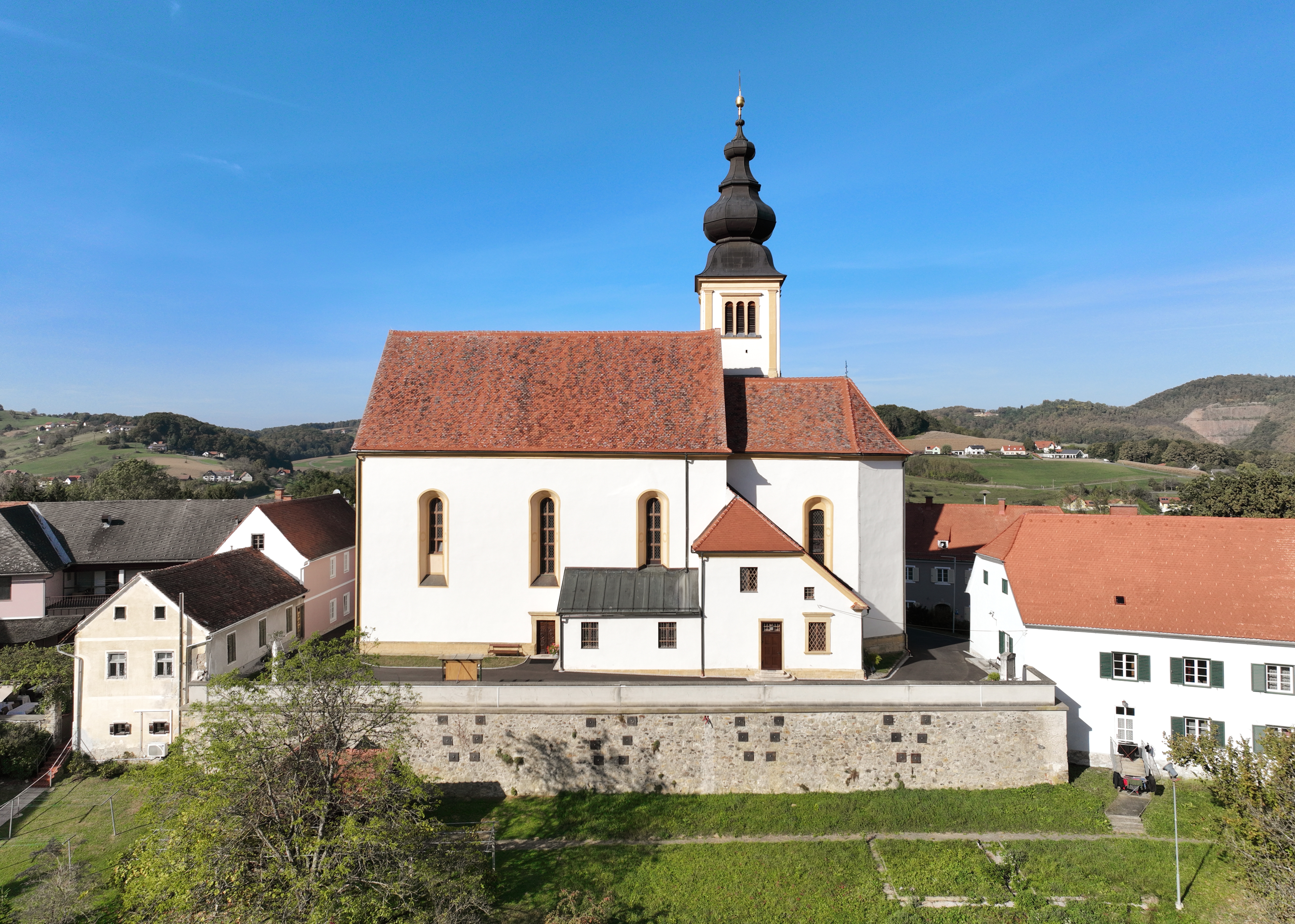
- Trautmannsdorf parish church

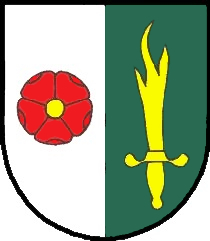
- Coat of arms

- Location within Austria
- Coordinates: 46°52′00″N 15°53′00″E
- Country: Austria
- State: Styria
- District: Südoststeiermark

Area
  - Total: 7.29 km^{2} (2.81 sq mi)
- Elevation: 326 m (1,070 ft)

Population (1 January 2016)
  - Total: 859
  - Density: 118/km^{2} (305/sq mi)
- Time zone: UTC+1 (CET)
  - Summer (DST): UTC+2 (CEST)
- Postal code: 8343, 8344
- Area code: +43 3159
- Vehicle registration: FB
- Website: www.trautmannsdorf-st.at

Trautmannsdorf in Oststeiermark is a former municipality with 859 inhabitants (1 January 2016) in the district of Südoststeiermark in the Austrian state of Styria. Since 1 January 2015 Trautmannsdorf is part of a new municipality with Bad Gleichenberg, Bairisch Kölldorf and Merkendorf. The new municipality is called Bad Gleichenberg.

== Population ==
Historical population
Year	Pop.	±%
1869	735	—
1880	814	+10.7%
1890	864	+6.1%
1900	804	−6.9%
1910	774	−3.7%
1923	780	+0.8%
1934	783	+0.4%
1939	747	−4.6%
1951	721	−3.5%
1961	769	+6.7%
1971	850	+10.5%
1981	878	+3.3%
1991	857	−2.4%
2001	877	+2.3%
2013	862	−1.7%
