= Stephan Mayer =

German politician

Stephan Mayer MdB
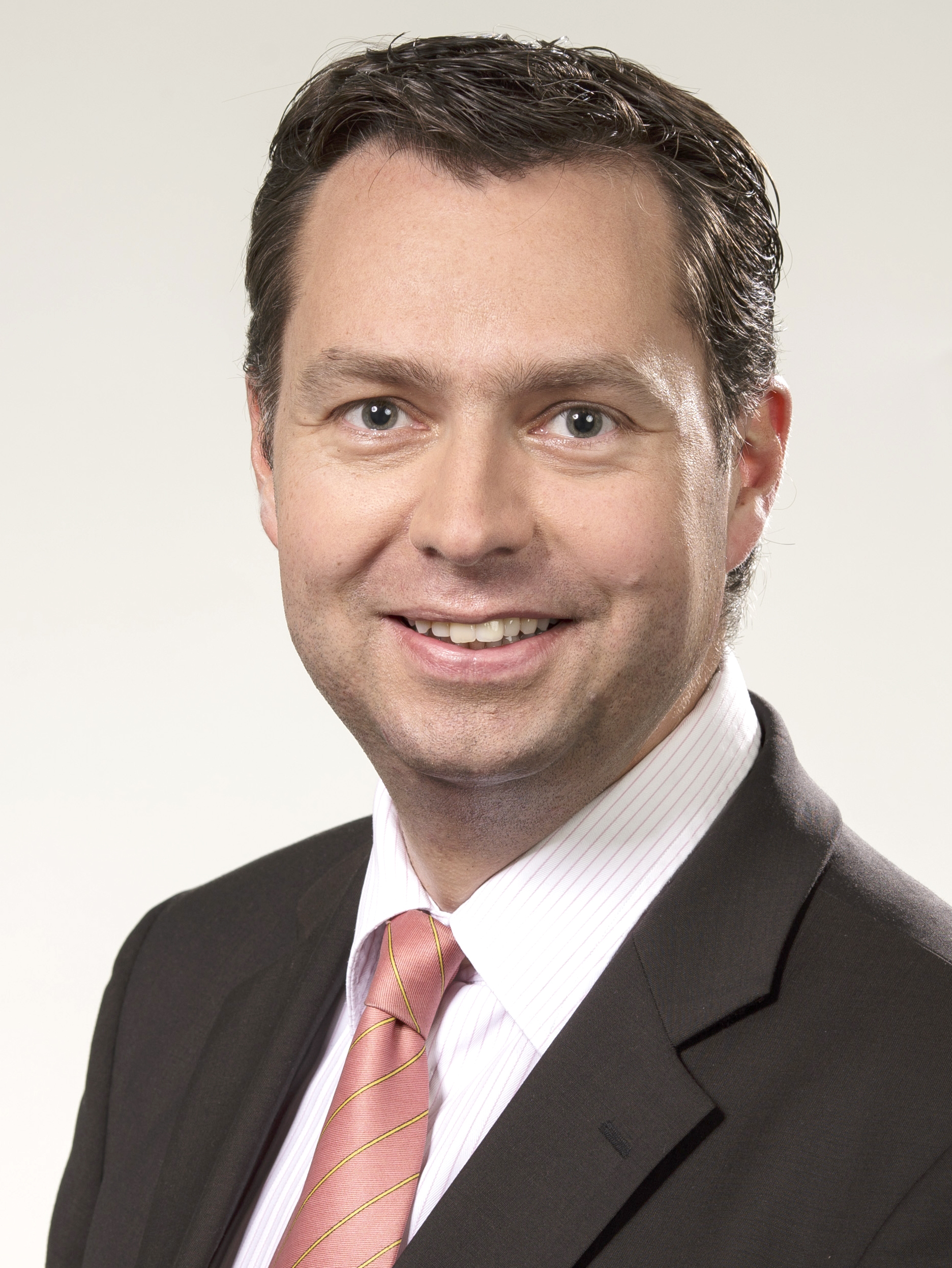
- Mayer in 2012

Secretary General of the Christian Social Union
- In office 23 February 2022 – 3 May 2022
- Leader: Markus Söder
- Deputy: Tanja Schorer-Dremel
- Preceded by: Markus Blume
- Succeeded by: Martin Huber

Parliamentary State Secretary for the Interior and Sports
- In office 14 March 2018 – 8 December 2021
- Minister: Horst Seehofer
- Preceded by: Ole Schröder

Member of the Bundestag; for Altötting
- Incumbent
- Assumed office 17 October 2002
- Preceded by: Josef Hollerith

Personal details
- Born: 15 December 1973 (age 52) Burghausen, West Germany
- Party: Christian Social Union
- Education: LMU Munich
- Occupation: Lawyer

Stephan Ernst Johann Mayer (born 15 December 1973) is a German lawyer and politician of the Christian Social Union (CSU) who has been a member of the German Bundestag since 2002. In 2022, he briefly served as the Secretary General of the CSU, under the leadership of the party's chairman Markus Söder.

== Early life ==
Mayer was born in Burghausen (Bavaria). In 1993, after leaving school, he attended LMU Munich to study law. He graduated in 1997 after passing the first state examination in Law. In 2000, he passed the second state examination and since 2009 has worked as a lawyer for the Nachmann Vilgertshofer Scharf Barfuß Rechtsanwalts GmbH in Munich.

== Political career ==
From 1994 to 2003, Mayer was chairman of the Regional Association of the youth organisation Junge Union in Altötting. Since 1997 he has been a deputy chairman of the CSU district association Altötting and to the council of the CSU Upper Bavaria district, led by Ilse Aigner. Since 2006, Mayer has been a Deputy Regional Chairman of the Union of Expellees (Union der Vertriebenen (UdV)), and since 2009 a member of the CSU leadership under party chairman Horst Seehofer.

=== Member of Parliament (2002–present) ===
Since the 2002 elections, Mayer has been a member of the Bundestag. In the 2009 elections, he received 60.7 percent of the primary votes and thus achieved the third best result in Germany.

In the Bundestag, Mayer was a full member of the Committee on Internal Affairs and of the Sports Committee. In that capacity, he was his parliamentary group's rapporteur on privacy law. He was a member of the Parliamentary Oversight Panel (PKGr) that provides parliamentary oversight of Germany's intelligence services. He chairs the so-called G10 Commission, which takes decisions on the necessity and admissibility of restrictions on the privacy of correspondence, posts and telecommunications pursuant to Article 10 of the Basic Law. He was an alternate member of the Committee on Transport, Building and Urban Development and of the NSA Investigation Committee. Within the group of CSU parliamentarians, Mayer chaired the Working Group for Internal Affairs, law, sport, voluntary work, culture and media of the CSU.

In addition to his committee assignments, Mayer served as chairman of the German-British Parliamentary Friendship Group.

In the negotiations to form a coalition government of the Christian Democrats (CDU together with the Bavarian CSU) and the Free Democratic Party (FDP) following the 2009 federal elections, Mayer was part of the CDU/CSU delegation in the working group on internal and legal affairs, led by Wolfgang Schäuble and Sabine Leutheusser-Schnarrenberger. Later, in the negotiations to form a Grand Coalition of the Christian Democrats and the Social Democrats (SPD) following the 2013 federal elections, he was part of the CDU/CSU delegation in the working group on integration and migration, led by Maria Böhmer and Aydan Özoğuz.

In February 2016, Mayer accompanied the president of the German Bundestag Norbert Lammert on a visit to the Zaatari refugee camp in Jordan to learn more about the plight of Syrians fleeing the Syrian civil war.

In the fourth government under Chancellor Angela Merkel, Mayer served as Parliamentary State Secretary in the Federal Ministry of the Interior under Horst Seehofer from 2018 to 2021.

Since the 2021 elections, Mayer has been serving as his parliamentary group's spokesperson for sports.

In November 2021, a search committee under the leadership of former President of Germany Christian Wulff recommended Mayer as candidate to succeed Alfons Hörmann as president of the German Olympic Sports Confederation (DOSB); instead Mayer later announced his candidacy as vice-president under the leadership of Thomas Weikert but had to resign shortly after when it was found that the role was incompatible with the German government's cooling-off period for former cabinet members.

== Other activities ==
- German Football Association (DFB), Egidius Braun Foundation, Member of the Board of Trustees
- Federation of Expellees (BdV), president
- Kuratorium Sport & Natur, deputy chairman of the board (since 2015)
- Association of German Foundations, Member of the Parliamentary Advisory Board (since 2009)
- Foundation Flight, Expulsion, Reconciliation, Member of the board of trustees (since 2005)
- Foundation for Data Protection, Member of the advisory board
- German Historical Museum (DHM), Member of the board of trustees (since 2005)
- Foundation "Remembrance, Responsibility and Future", alternate member of the board of trustees (since 2005)
- German-Hungarian Youth Office, Member of the board of trustees
- Foundation Archives of Parties and Mass Organisations of the GDR in the Federal Archives (SAPMO), Member of the board of trustees (2009–2013)

From 2010 until 2018, Mayer served as the president of the Federal Agency for Technical Relief (Technisches Hilfswerk-Bundesvereinigung e.V.) and president of the Federal Civil Defence and Protection against disasters in Federal Republic of Germany.

== Political positions ==
Following the 2016 Munich shooting, Mayer called for a review of Germany's gun laws and for stricter enforcement, arguing that "I support stricter regulations on the weapons trade and the creation of a European weapons registry modeled on the German national registry."

In early 2017, Mayer and his colleague Armin Schuster of the CDU presented a joint proposal for a flexible target for how many asylum seekers Germany should accept each year as a compromise to end a row between CDU and CSU over immigration. In a letter to the two parties’ chairpersons, Chancellor Angela Merkel and Minister-President Horst Seehofer, they called for Germany to set a new target each year based on the humanitarian situation in crisis zones worldwide and on Germany's ability to absorb newcomers.

In June 2017, Mayer voted against Germany's introduction of same-sex marriage.
