= Gardone Riviera =

Gardone Riviera Gardù de Riera
- Comune
- Comune di Gardone Riviera
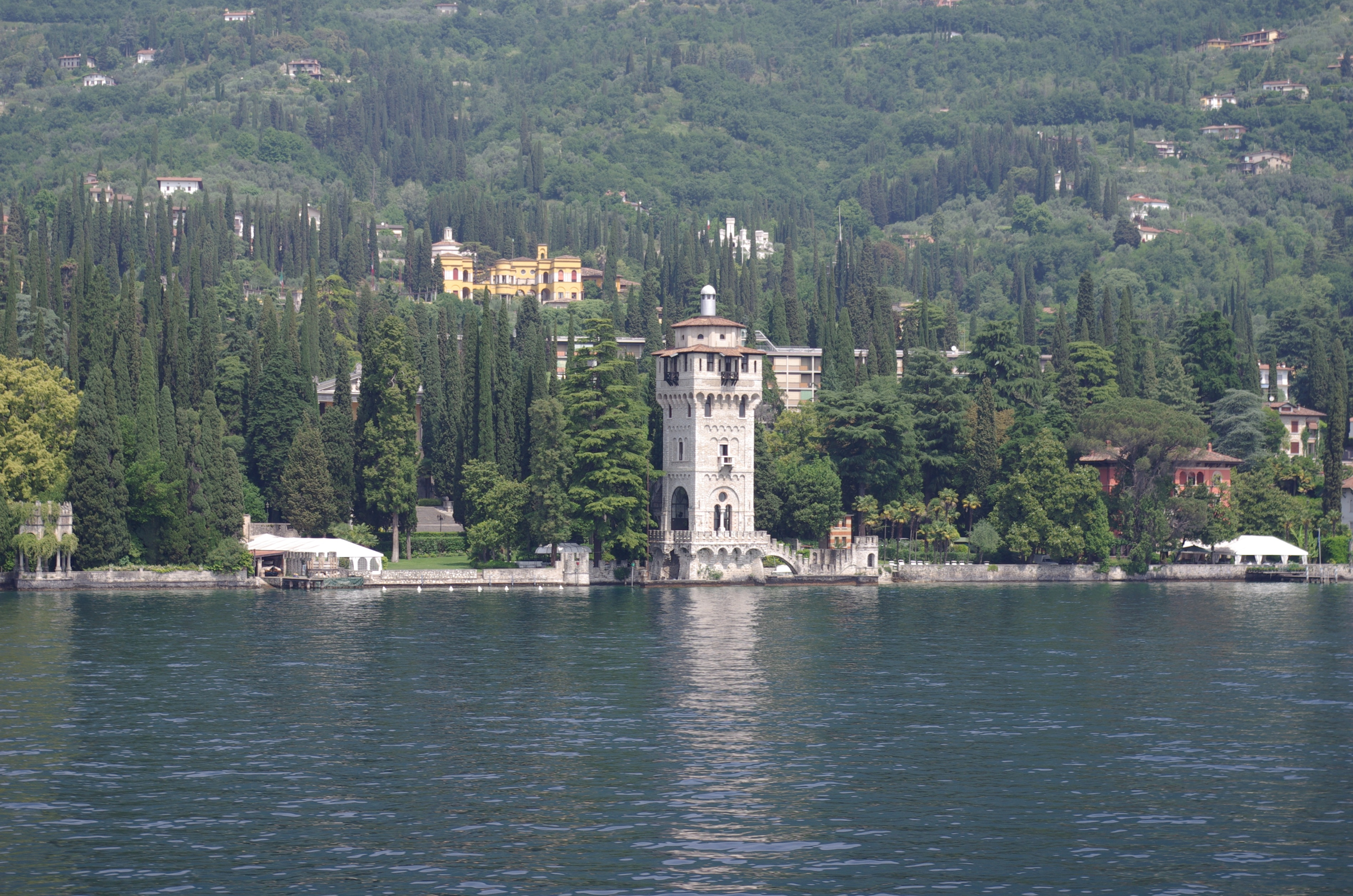
- Panorama of Gardone Riviera

- Coat of arms

- Location within Italy Location within Lombardy
- Coordinates: 45°37′N 10°34′E
- Country: Italy
- Region: Lombardy
- Province: Brescia (BS)
- Frazioni: Fasano, San Michele, Morgnaga, Tresnico

Government
  - Mayor: Andrea Cipani

Area
  - Total: 20 km^{2} (7.7 sq mi)

Population (2011)
  - Total: 2,782
  - Density: 140/km^{2} (360/sq mi)
- Time zone: UTC+1 (CET)
  - Summer (DST): UTC+2 (CEST)
- Postal code: 25083
- Dialing code: 0365
- Website: Official website

Gardone Riviera (Gardesano: Gardù de Riera) is a town and comune in the province of Brescia, in Lombardy. It is situated on the western shore of Lake Garda. It is one of I Borghi più belli d'Italia ("The most beautiful villages of Italy").

== Twin towns ==
Gardone Riviera is twinned with:

- Arcachon, France, since 1980
- Pescara, Italy, since 2010

== Main sights ==
- The Vittoriale degli Italiani is a former residence of the poet Gabriele D'Annunzio. He donated it to the Italian State before his death. It is now a national monument and houses a MAS fast military ship and the plane on which D'Annunzio raided Vienna.
- The English band King Crimson recorded in its auditorium the songs "Three of a Perfect Pair" and "Blastic Rhino" for the album Heavy ConstruKction recorded (June 21, 2000).
- The Giardino Botanico Fondazione André Heller is a botanical garden maintained by artist André Heller.
