= Giardino Botanico Fondazione André Heller =

Botanical garden in Italy

Coordinates: 45°37′15″N 10°33′43″E

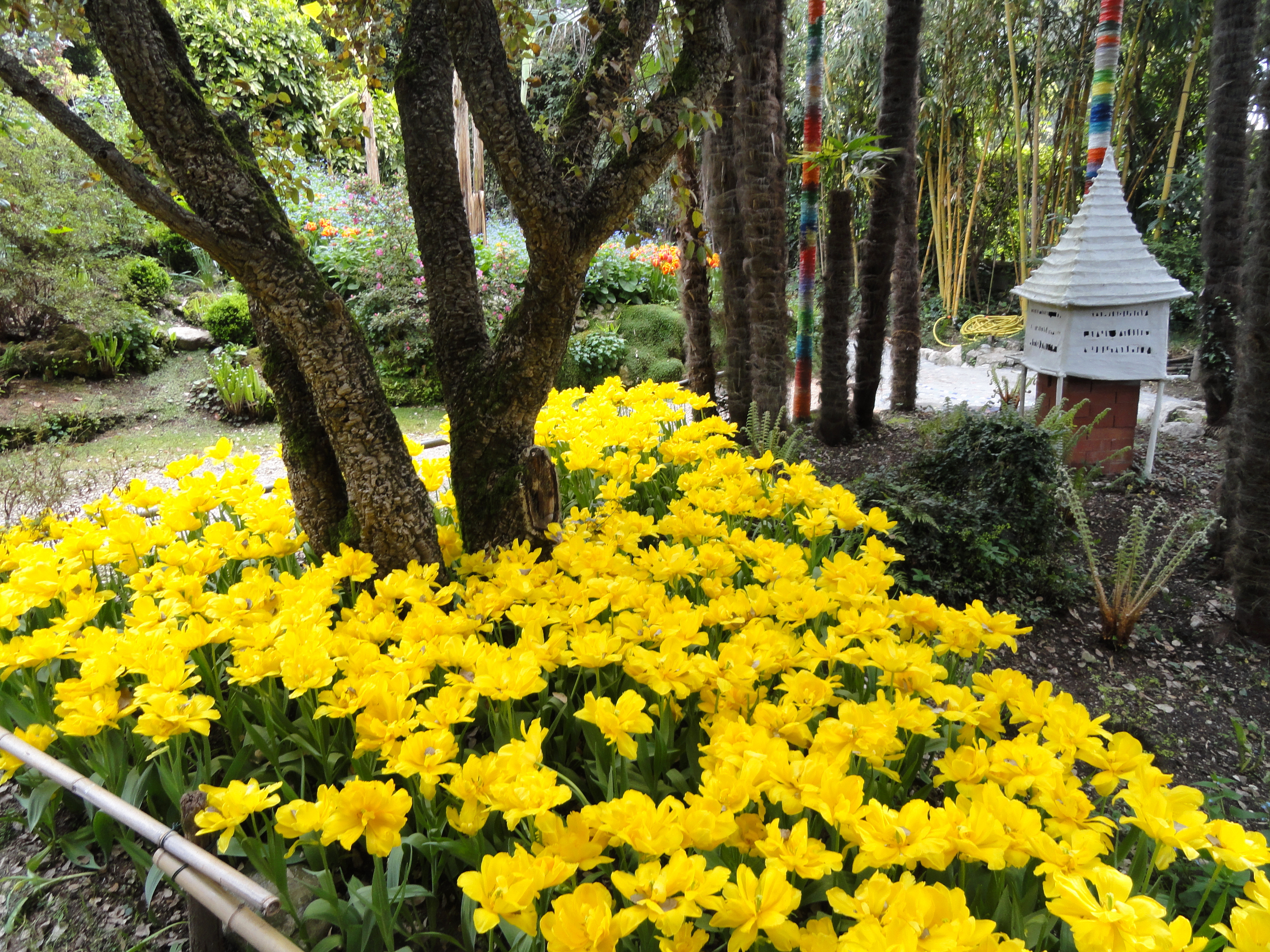
Giardino Botanico Fondazione André Heller

The Giardino Botanico Fondazione André Heller (2 acres), also known as the Giardino Botanico A. Hruska, is a botanical garden located on the grounds of the André Heller Foundation above Lake Garda, in via Roma, Gardone Riviera, Province of Brescia, Lombardy, Italy. It is open daily in the warmer months.

The garden was established circa 1901 by Arturo Hruska (1889–1971), an Austrian dentist and botanist, who from 1910 to 1971 collected many species on the grounds of his villa, organized as a dense forest of bamboo, Japanese ponds, streams, and waterfalls, as well as alpine plants in ravines. Since 1988 it has been owned by artist André Heller, and now contains interesting sculptures by Keith Haring, Roy Lichtenstein, and so forth, set among more than 500 species including cactus, edelweiss, ferns including Osmunda regalis, magnolias, orchids, water lilies, and trees.

== See also ==
- List of botanical gardens in Italy
