= Josef Bauer (politician) =

German politician (1915–1989)

Member of the Bundestag; for Altötting
- In office 6 October 1953 – 20 October 1969
- Preceded by: Georg Mayerhofer
- Succeeded by: Valentin Dasch

Personal details
- Born: 10 June 1915 Wasserburg am Inn, Germany
- Died: 15 July 1989 (aged 74) Wasserburg am Inn, West Germany
- Party: Christian Social Union

Josef Bauer (10 June 1915 – 15 July 1989) was a German politician and a member of the Bundestag for the Christian Social Union in Bavaria from 1953 to 1969.

== Biography ==
Bauer was born in Wasserburg am Inn in 1915.

On 4 November 1937 he became a member of the Nazi Party. He started from 1953 as a town councillor in Bavaria.

From 1963 to 1969 he was deputy chairman of the CSU regional committee in CDU/CSU the Bundestag faction. He represented the constituency Altötting in the parliament. He represented during the 5th Bundestag.

From 1962 to 1970 Bauer was also state parliament delegate for the CSU in Bavaria.

He was governor of Landkreis Wasserburg am Inn from 1970 to 1972.

== See also ==
- List of Bavarian Christian Social Union politicians
