= Münchendorf =

Münchendorf Mingaduaf
- Municipality
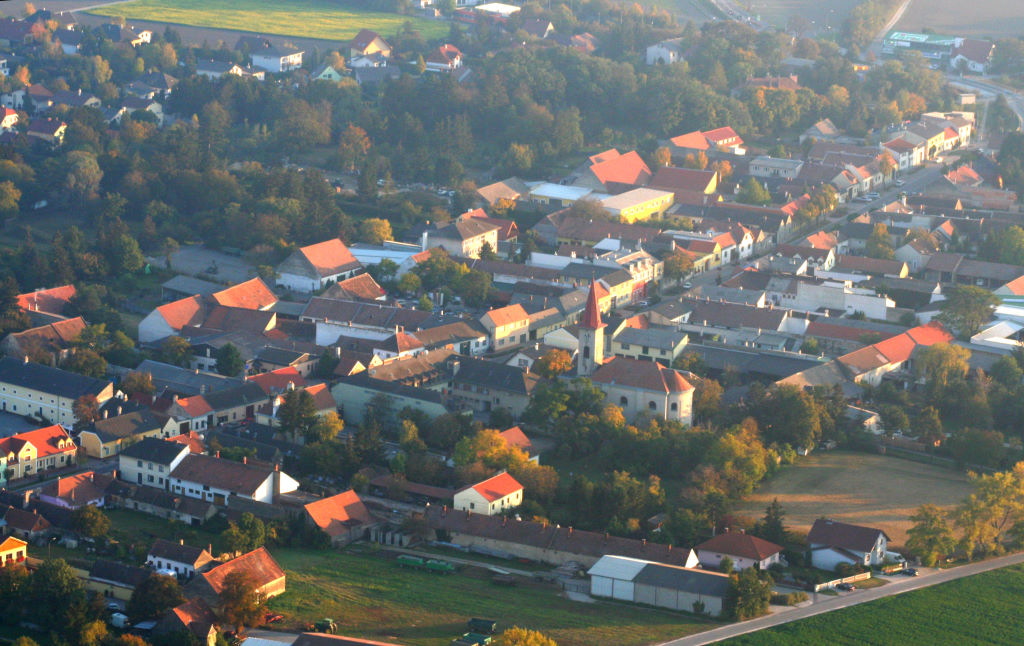
- Aerial view

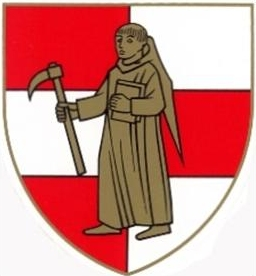
- Coat of arms

- Location within Austria
- Coordinates: 48°1′N 16°22′E
- Country: Austria
- State: Lower Austria
- District: Mödling

Government
  - Mayor: Josef Ehrenberger (SPÖ)

Area
  - Total: 20 km^{2} (7.7 sq mi)
- Elevation: 186 m (610 ft)

Population (2018-01-01)
  - Total: 2,992
  - Density: 150/km^{2} (390/sq mi)
- Time zone: UTC+1 (CET)
  - Summer (DST): UTC+2 (CEST)
- Postal code: 2482
- Area code: 02259
- Website: www.muenchendorf.at

Münchendorf (German: [ˈmʏnçn̩ˌdɔʁf]; Central Bavarian: Mingaduaf) is a town in the district of Mödling in the Austrian state of Lower Austria.

== Population ==
Historical population
Year	Pop.	±%
1971	1,055	—
1981	1,152	+9.2%
1991	1,690	+46.7%
2001	2,229	+31.9%
2011	2,498	+12.1%
