= Johann Müllner =

Austrian politician (1932–2022)

Member of the Landtag of Burgenland
- In office 1978–1991

Personal details
- Born: 20 July 1932 Wallern im Burgenland, Burgenland, Austria
- Died: 3 October 2022 (aged 90)
- Party: SPÖ
- Occupation: Farmer

Johann Müllner (20 July 1932 – 3 October 2022) was an Austrian farmer and politician. A member of the Social Democratic Party, he served in the Landtag of Burgenland from 1978 to 1991.

Müllner died on 3 October 2022, at the age of 90.
