= Franz Kurzreiter =

Austrian farmer and politician (1944–2022)

Member of the Landtag of Lower Austria
- In office 1986–2003

Personal details
- Born: 10 December 1944 Kottaun, Geras, Alpine and Danube Reichsgaue
- Died: 14 December 2022 (aged 78)
- Party: ÖVP
- Occupation: Farmer

Franz Kurzreiter (10 December 1944 – 14 December 2022) was an Austrian politician. A member of the Austrian People's Party, he served in the Landtag of Lower Austria from 1986 to 2003.

Kurzreiter died on 14 December 2022, at the age of 78.
