= Peter Polleruhs =

Austrian engineer and politician (1949–2022)

Member of the National Council of Austria
- In office 1 May 1993 – 21 January 2002

Personal details
- Born: 28 October 1949 Kapfenberg, Allied-occupied Austria
- Died: 17 October 2022 (aged 72)
- Party: ÖVP
- Education: HTL Kapfenberg
- Occupation: Engineer

Peter Polleruhs (28 October 1949 – 17 October 2022) was an Austrian engineer and politician. A member of the Austrian People's Party, he served in the National Council from 1993 to 2002.

Polleruhs died on 17 October 2022, at the age of 72.
