= Ferdinand Hueter =

Austrian politician (1960–2022)

Member of the Landtag of Carinthia
- In office 31 March 2004 – 13 February 2022

Personal details
- Born: 31 January 1960
- Died: 13 February 2022 (aged 62)
- Party: ÖVP

Ferdinand Hueter (31 January 1960 – 13 February 2022) was an Austrian politician. A member of the Austrian People's Party, he served in the Landtag of Carinthia from 2004 to 2022. He died on 13 February 2022, at the age of 62.
