= Bairisch Kölldorf =

- Former municipality
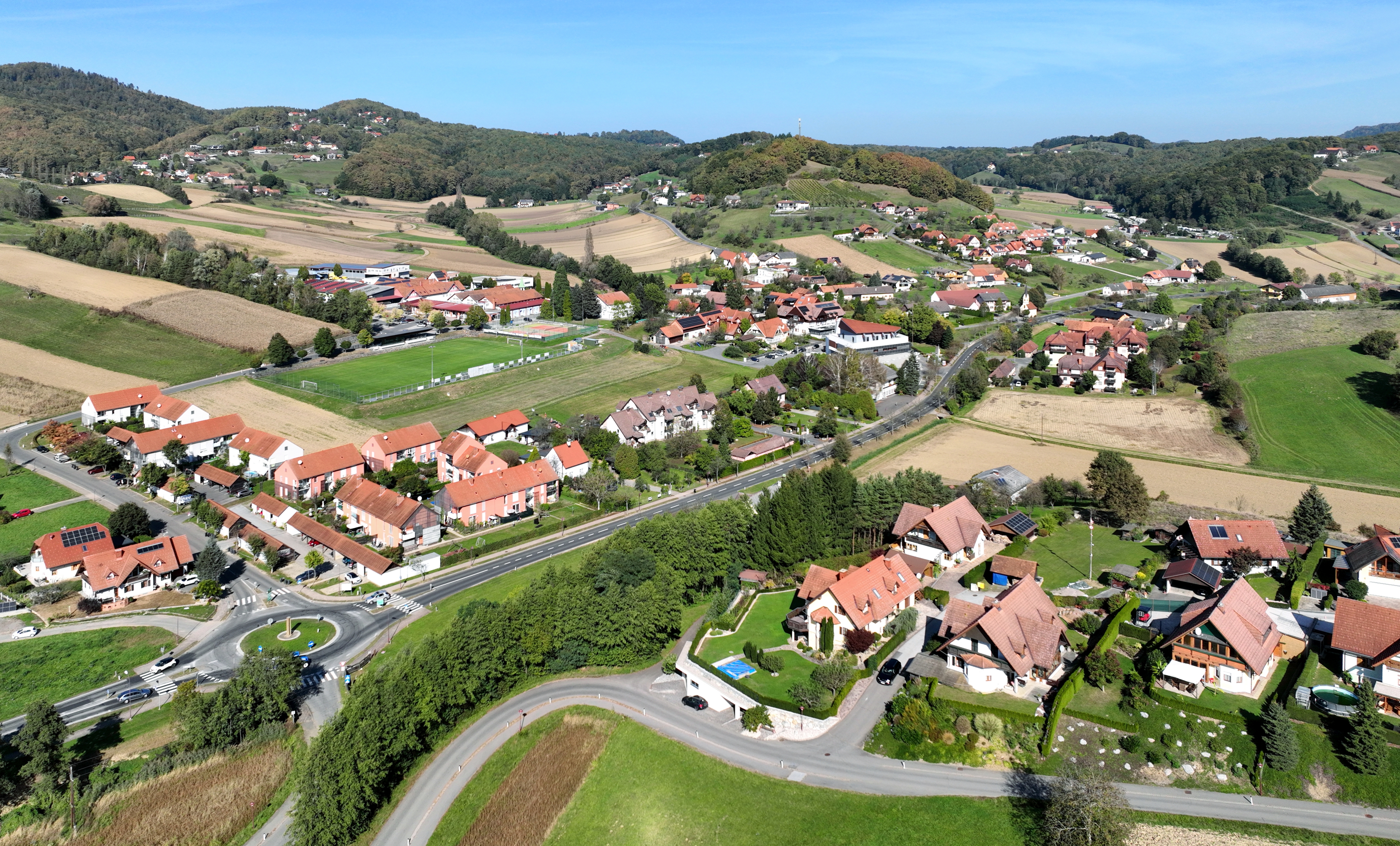
- South-southwest view of Bairisch Kölldorf

- Coat of arms

- Location within Austria
- Coordinates: 46°52′00″N 15°57′00″E
- Country: Austria
- State: Styria
- District: Südoststeiermark

Area
  - Total: 6.34 km^{2} (2.45 sq mi)
- Elevation: 280 m (920 ft)

Population (1 January 2021)
  - Total: 988
  - Density: 156/km^{2} (404/sq mi)
- Time zone: UTC+1 (CET)
  - Summer (DST): UTC+2 (CEST)
- Postal code: 8344
- Area code: +43 3159
- Vehicle registration: SO

Bairisch Kölldorf is a former municipality in the district of Südoststeiermark in the Austrian state of Styria. Since the 2015 Styria municipal structural reform, it is part of the municipality Bad Gleichenberg.

== Geography ==
The municipality lies about 45 km southeast of Graz and 11 km southeast of Feldbach in the east Styrian hills.
