= Josef Schagerl =

Austrian sculptor (1923–2022)

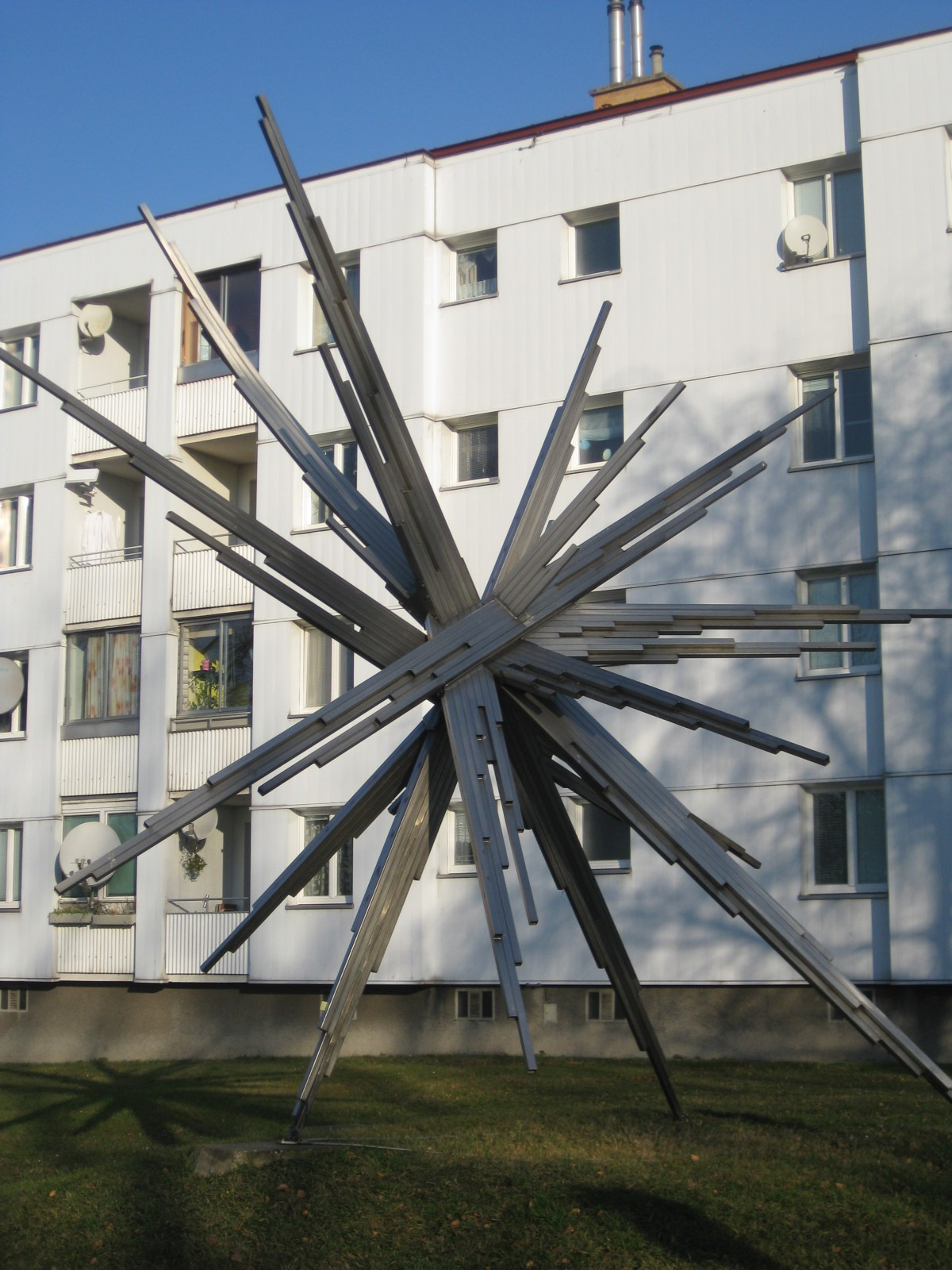
- Raumstürmer ST 86 (1971)
- Born: 25 August 1923; Gaming, Austria
- Died: 12 December 2022 (aged 99)
- Education: Academy of Fine Arts Vienna
- Occupation: Sculptor

Josef Schagerl (25 August 1923 – 12 December 2022) was an Austrian sculptor.

== Biography ==
Schagerl was the son of Josef Schagerl Sr. and his wife, Rosa. After completing an apprenticeship as a carpenter from 1938 to 1941, he worked in his father's studio. That year, he was drafted into military service and returned in 1946. He then attended the Academy of Fine Arts Vienna, where he graduated with a degree in sculpture in 1952. From 1951 to 1964, he worked on restoration of historical sights in Vienna, including the design of a tombstone for Gustav Klimt in 1962. As a freelance artist, he contributed to multiple percent for art projects.

Schagerl died on 12 December 2022, at the age of 99.

== Exhibitions ==
- Josef Schagerl – Poesie der Geometrie (Lower Austria Museum, 2013)

== Publications ==
- Das Werk des Bildhauers Josef Schagerl (1994)
- Das Werk von Josef Schagerl (2004)
