= Johanna Priglinger =

Austrian politician (1986–2022)

Member of the Landtag of Upper Austria
- In office 7 November 2013 – 23 October 2015

Personal details
- Born: 19 October 1986 Linz, Austria
- Died: 13 November 2022 (aged 36)
- Party: ÖVP
- Occupation: Lawyer

Johanna Priglinger (19 October 1986 – 13 November 2022) was an Austrian politician. A member of the Austrian People's Party, she served in the Landtag of Upper Austria from 2013 to 2015.

Priglinger died on 13 November 2022, at the age of 36.
