= Alfred Mayer (politician) =

Austrian politician (1936–2022)

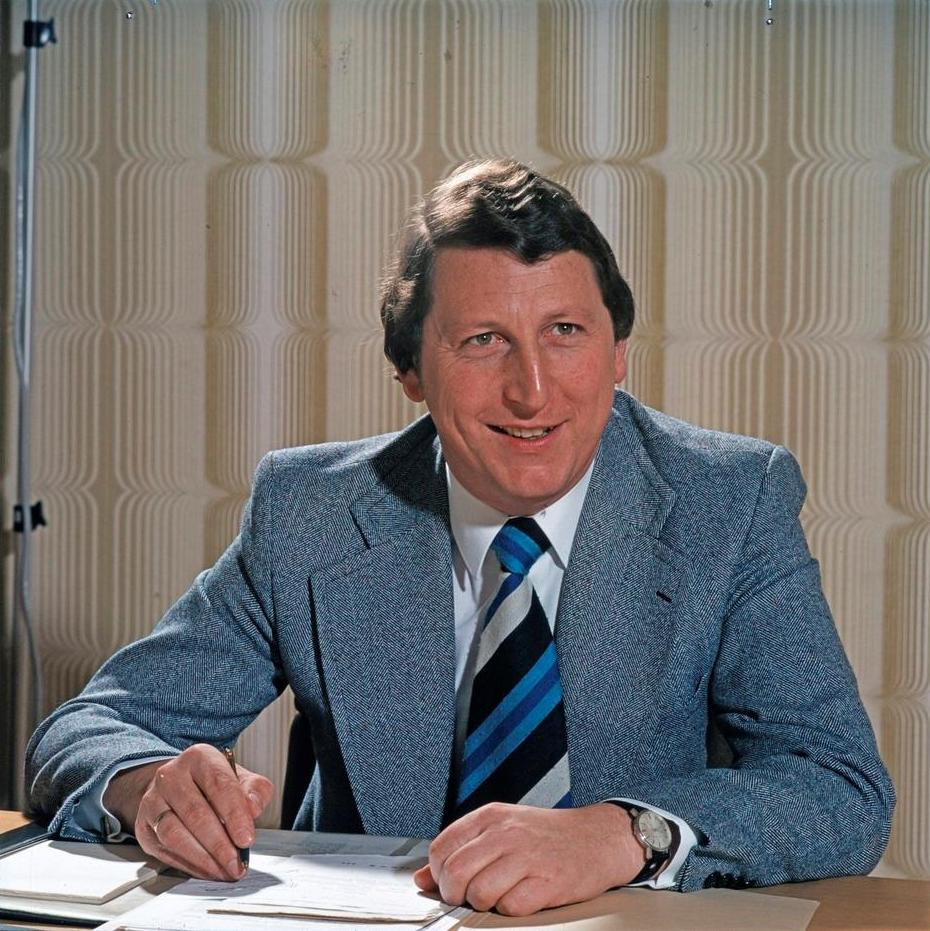

Landesrat of Vorarlberg
- In office 4 November 1974 – 3 February 1993
- Succeeded by: Hans-Peter Bischof

Personal details
- Born: 5 March 1936 Bregenz, Vorarlberg, Austria
- Died: 1 March 2022 (aged 85)
- Party: ÖVP
- Education: Sparkasse Bludenz

Alfred Mayer (5 March 1936 – 1 March 2022) was an Austrian politician.

A member of the Austrian People's Party, he served as a Landesrat of Vorarlberg from 1974 to 1993.

He died on 1 March 2022, at the age of 85.
