= Edmund Freibauer =

Austrian professor and politician (1937–2022)

President of the Landtag of Lower Austria
- In office 16 April 1998 – 10 April 2008
- Preceded by: Franz Romeder
- Succeeded by: Hans Penz

Personal details
- Born: 20 February 1937 Ringelsdorf, Austria
- Died: 29 November 2022 (aged 85)
- Party: ÖVP
- Education: University of Vienna
- Occupation: Professor

Edmund Freibauer (20 February 1937 – 29 November 2022) was an Austrian professor and politician. A member of the Austrian People's Party, he served as president of the Landtag of Lower Austria from 1998 to 2008.

Freibauer died on 29 November 2022, at the age of 85.
