= Herman Rechberger =

Austrian-born Finnish composer (1947–2022)

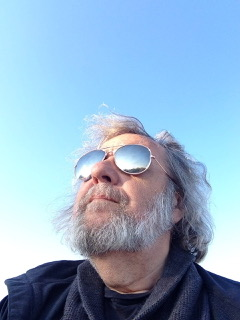
- Rechberger in 2013
- Born: 14 February 1947; Linz, Allied-occupied Austria
- Died: 11 January 2022 (aged 74)
- Occupation: Composer

Herman Rechberger (14 February 1947 – 11 January 2022) was an Austrian-born Finnish composer, conductor and musician.

== Life and career ==
Born in Linz, Allied-occupied Austria, Rechberger studied classical guitar at the Bruckner-Konservatorium in his hometown and later continued his musical studies in Zürich and at the Brussels Conservatory. In 1970 he moved to Finland to attend the Sibelius Academy in Helsinki, graduating in recorder, guitar and composition. He was granted citizenship in 1974, and after working for a few years as a music teacher he worked at the Finnish Broadcasting Company as a music journalist, a producer of contemporary music and as director of Yle Experimental Studio.

Rechberger's compositions spanned different genres, including operas, symphonies, happenings, sonic sculptures, electronic music, orchestral compositions as well as reconstructions of ancient music. He was also active as a recorder player, touring with Sonores Antiqui and The Poor Knights, and as a conductor.

He died on 11 January 2022, at the age of 74.
