= Alois Roppert =

Austrian politician (1934–2022)

Member of the National Council of Austria
- In office 5 June 1979 – 6 November 1994

Personal details
- Born: 25 May 1934 Sollenau, Austria
- Died: 15 September 2022 (aged 88)
- Party: SPÖ
- Occupation: Trade unionist

Alois Roppert (25 May 1934 – 15 September 2022) was an Austrian politician. A member of the Social Democratic Party of Austria, he served in the National Council from 1979 to 1994.

Roppert died on 15 September 2022 at the age of 88.
