= Josef Bauer (SS officer) =

German Nazi politician

Munich Director National Socialist Teachers League
- In office 1941 – 8 May 1945

Senior City School Director, Munich
- In office 20 June 1933 – 8 May 1945

Reichstag Deputy
- In office 12 November 1933 – 8 May 1945

Chairman, Bavarian Teachers Association
- In office 1933 – 1 January 1938

Personal details
- Born: 25 January 1881 Munich, Kingdom of Bavaria, German Empire
- Died: 30 April 1958 (aged 77) Munich, West Germany
- Party: Nazi Party
- Profession: Schoolteacher
- Civilian awards: Golden Party Badge

Military service
- Allegiance: German Empire
- Branch/service: Royal Bavarian Army
- Years of service: 1915–1918
- Rank: Leutnant
- Unit: Life Infantry Regiment; 2nd Infantry Regiment
- Battles/wars: World War I
- Military awards: Iron Cross, 2nd class

Josef Bauer (25 January 1881 – 30 April 1958) was a German schoolteacher who became a Nazi Party official and politician. He held several leadership positions in the Nazi educational establishment and served as a deputy in the Reichstag. He was also an SS-Brigadeführer.

== Early life ==
Bauer, was born the son of a blacksmith and a teacher in Munich. He attended Volksschule, teacher preparatory school and university. He worked as a teacher in Mitterfels, Passau, and Munich. In 1911, he undertook a study tour of England. From 1915 to 1918, he served in the First World War in the Royal Bavarian Army with the Life Infantry Regiment and the 2nd Infantry Regiment on the western front. He attained the rank of Leutnant and was awarded the Iron Cross, 2nd class.

== Nazi Party career ==
Bauer first joined the Nazi Party in November 1922 and participated in the Beer Hall Putsch in Munich as a storm troop leader in the Sturmabteilung (SA). After the ban on the Nazi Party was lifted, he rejoined the Nazi Party on 1 April 1925 (membership number 34). As an early Party member, he later would be awarded the Golden Party Badge. He became an Ortsgruppenleiter (local group leader) in Munich and, in 1930, a Reich speaker and head of the Gau speaker school. From 1932 to 1933, Bauer was a member of the Landtag of Bavaria, where he was chairman of the Nazi Party parliamentary group.

After the Nazis seized power, he was appointed to the Munich City School Board on 23 April 1933. From 20 June, he held the title of Senior City School Director and held this position until the end of the National Socialist regime. In Munich, Bauer led the movement to abolish denominational schools in favor of public schools. In November 1933, he was elected to the Reichstag from electoral constituency 24, Upper Bavaria–Swabia. He would retain this seat until the end of the Nazi regime in May 1945. From 1933 until its dissolution and incorporation into the National Socialist Teachers League (NSLB) on 1 January 1938, Bauer was chairman of the Bavarian Teachers Association. In 1937, he became a political director in the Main Office for Local Politics in the Party's Reichsleitung (national leadership), where he directed the department for municipal school issues. From 1941, he was the director of the Munich district office of the office of educators in the NSLB.

Bauer had been a member of the SA since the early 1920s, and reached the rank of SA-Obersturmführer. He transferred to the Schutzstaffel (SS) in January 1935 (SS number 264,413), entering with the rank of SS-Standartenführer. In 1936, he was promoted to SS-Oberführer and on 1 January 1940 to SS-Brigadeführer. Bauer died in Munich in April 1958.

=== Mein Kampf signed books ===
In February 2014, a rare two-volume set of Mein Kampf signed by Adolf Hitler, which had been Hitler’s holiday gift to Bauer, sold for $64,850 at Nate D. Sanders Auctions in Los Angeles. In the autograph, Hitler sent Bauer his best wishes for the Christmas season.
