= Sandra Bubendorfer-Licht =

German interpreter and politician

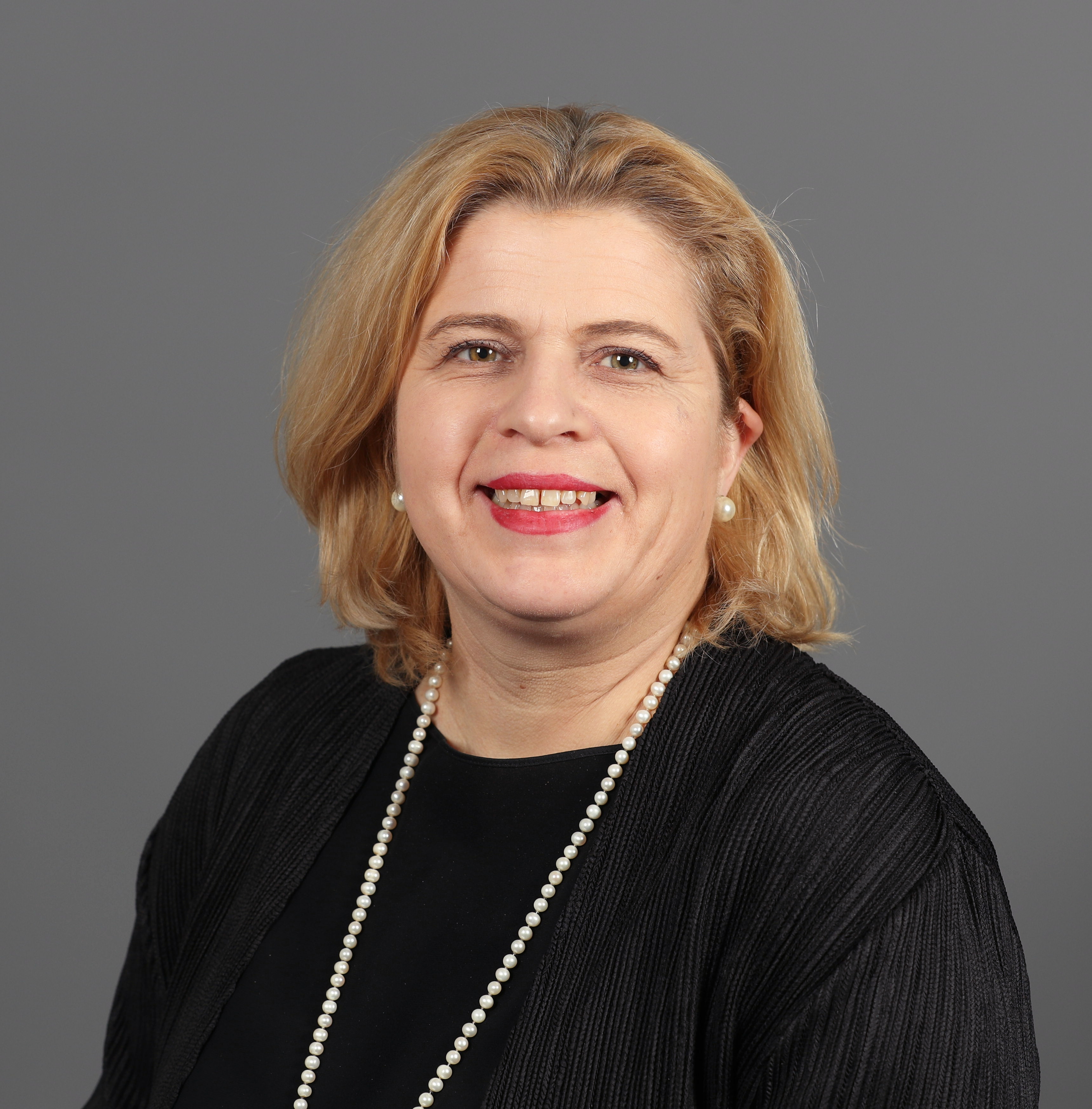
- Bubendorfer-Licht in 2020

Member of the Bundestag for Bavaria
- In office 9 December 2019 – 25 March 2025
- Constituency: FDP List

Personal details
- Born: 5 September 1969 (age 56) Mühldorf a. Inn, West Germany
- Party: Free Democratic Party
- Children: 2
- Education: Sprachen & Dolmetscher Institut München

Sandra Bubendorfer-Licht (born 5 September 1969) is a German interpreter and politician of the Free Democratic Party (FDP) who served as a member of the Bundestag from the state of Bavaria from 2019 to 2025.

== Political career ==
Bubendorfer-Licht is chairwoman of the district association Mühldorf am Inn of the FDP Bavaria. She is an observer on the state executive committee of the FDP Bavaria.

In the 2017 federal elections, Bubendorfer-Licht was a direct candidate in the Altötting constituency and ran for 13th place on the list for the FDP in Bavaria. On 9 December 2019 she moved up to the Bundestag to replace the late Jimmy Schulz. In parliament, she was a member of the Committee on Home Affairs and the Committee on Petitions. Following the 2021 elections, she served as her parliamentary group’s spokesperson for religious communities.
