= Karolos Trikolidis =

Austrian conductor (1947–2022)

Karolos Trikolidis (24 July 1947 – 20 January 2022) (German: Karl Kaspar Trikolidis, Greek: Κάρολος Τρικολίδης) was a conductor of Greek-Austrian origin.

== Life and career ==
Trikolidis was born in Bad Aussee, Allied-occupied Austria, to a Greek father and Austrian mother. He studied at the music universities of Vienna and Salzburg. He studied violin with Günter Pichler, composition with Alfred Uhl and Cesar Bresgen, percussion with Richard Hochrainer and conducting with Hans Swarowsky and Miltiades Caridis. He took part as active participant in the annual masterclasses of Franco Ferrara, Pierre Boulez and Herbert von Karajan. Along with Swarowsky and Caridis, he received conducting lessons by composer and conductor Bruno Maderna.

He started to work as assistant to Giuseppe Patanae and Sir Adrian Boult, and after competing in Paris he was chosen to work as selected fellowship conductor of the Boston Symphony Orchestra next to Leonard Bernstein, Seiji Ozawa and André Previn. He won the first prizes of the international conducting competitions in Besançon in 1970, Florence in 1971 and Budapest in 1977.

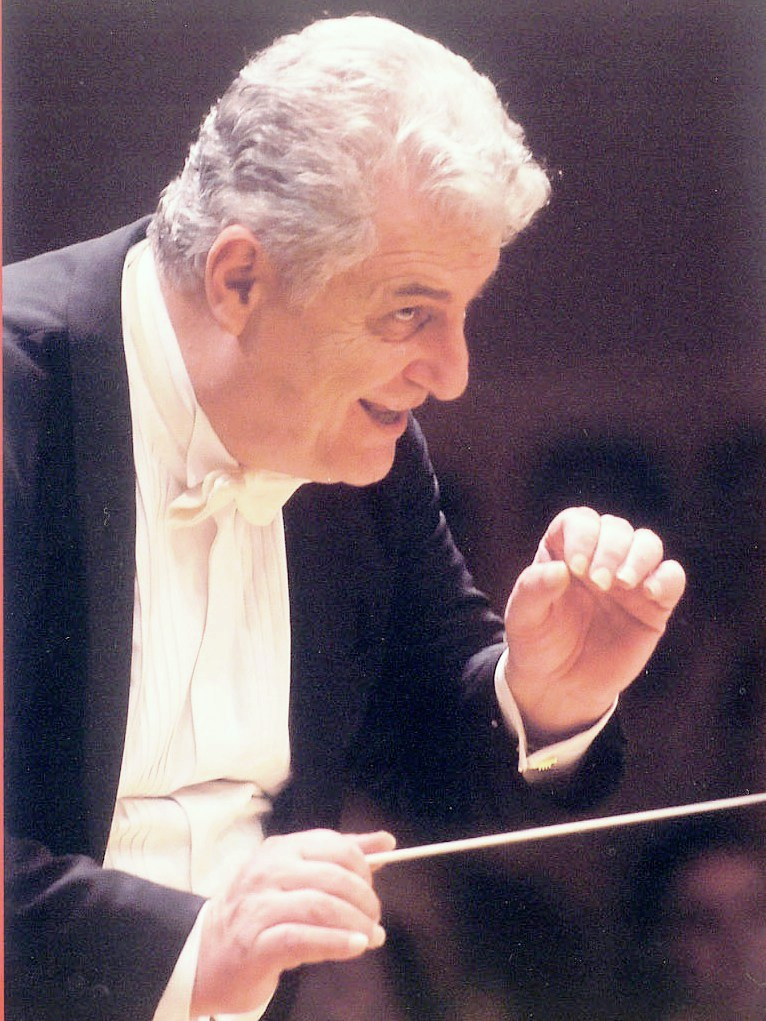

From 1972 on he worked in permanent positions as 1st Kapellmeister at several Opera houses in West Germany and Hungary, served as permanent conductor of the Ballet National de Marseille "Roland Petit" with which he toured through Europe, was also invited by the Aterballetto and the Ballets of Bolshoi and Kremlin, worked as principal guest conductor of the Iceland Symphony Orchestra, as general music director of the Debrecen Philharmonic Orchestra and repeatedly as guest conductor of the Russian National Orchestra for concerts in Moscow and tours to the Volga cities and the Athens Festival.

Trikolidis was at the same time, from 1972, the permanent conductor and music director of the Thessaloniki State Symphony Orchestra for 38 years. As guest conductor he repeatedly conducted more than 140 orchestras in Europe, Australia, Russia and Japan, including: the Orchestre national de l'ORTF, the Russian National Orchestra, the Symphony Orchestras of Berlin, Nuremberg, Prague, Melbourne, the Symphony Orchestra of the Hungarian Radio and Television, the BBC National Orchestra of Wales, the Radio Symphony Orchestras of Hilversum, Sofia, Budapest, Belgrade, Bucharest, Lille, Athens and Moscow, the Budapest Philharmonic, Dresden Philharmonic, Yerevan Philharmonic, the Slovenian Philharmonic Orchestra, the Gulbenkian Orchestra in Lisbon, the George Enescu Philharmonic Orchestra, the Bruckner Orchestra Linz, the Graz Philharmonic, the Tonkünstler Orchestra in Vienna, the State Symphony Orchestra of Brandenburg in Berlin and the Athens State Orchestra.

He appeared at the festivals of Dresden, Paris, Budapest, Aix-en-Provence, Besançon, Athens, Vienna “Music Summer” and the “Dimitria festival” of Thessaloniki. He conducted in radio productions and TV concerts with ABC, BBC, ORTF, RAI, WDR, ORF, MRT, NRU, and a cycle of 12 TV concerts with the Hungarian television. He has recorded CDs with: a) the Budapest Philharmonic Orchestra (Hungaroton), Verdi – Overtures, b) the Gulbenkian Symphony Orchestra of Lisbon (Syrinx), Mozart – Piano Concertos with soloist Georges Pludermacher) with the Iceland Symphony Orchestra (S.C.U.), Works of Icelandic composers.

Trikolidis died on 20 January 2022, at the age of 74.
