= Gustav Ortner =

Austrian diplomat (1935–2022)

Austrian Ambassador to the Holy See
- In office 1997–2001

Personal details
- Born: 17 February 1935 Vienna, Austria
- Died: 7 February 2022 (aged 86)
- Education: Vienna University of Economics and Business; University of Vienna

Gustav Ortner (17 February 1935 – 7 February 2022) was an Austrian diplomat. He was Austrian Ambassador to the Holy See from 1997 to 2001. He died on 7 February 2022, at the age of 86.
