= Maria Simon (sociologist) =

Austrian scholar of social work (1918–2022)

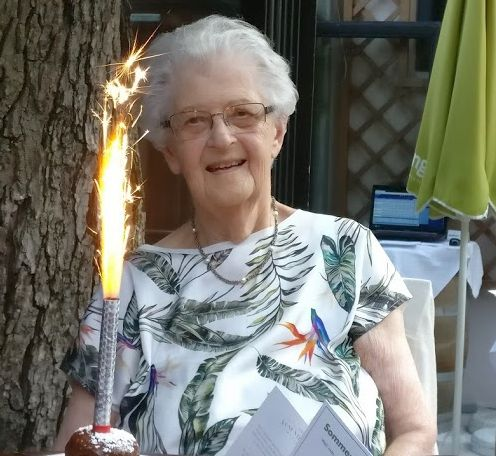
- Simon in 2018
- Born: 6 August 1918; Vienna, Austria-Hungary
- Died: 8 March 2022 (aged 103); Vienna, Austria
- Spouse: Joseph Simon (m. 1944)

Academic background
- Education: University of Oxford; University of London; University of Vienna (PhD, 1952)
- Influences: Anna Freud; Dorothy Burlingham; August Aichhorn; Alfred Winterstein; Bruno Bettelheim

Academic work
- Discipline: Sociology
- Sub-discipline: Social work
- Institutions: University of Arkansas; Institute for Advanced Studies in Vienna; Akademie für Sozialarbeit der Stadt Wien

Maria Dorothea Simon (née Pollatschek; 6 August 1918 – 8 March 2022) was an Austrian psychologist and scholar of social work. Born into a Jewish family in Vienna near the end of the First World War, she was educated in Austria and Czechoslovakia but emigrated to London after the latter was annexed by Germany in 1938. While in the United Kingdom, she worked at the Hampstead Nurseries, an experimental child care centre run by the psychoanalyst Anna Freud. She was married to the jurist and resistance activist Joseph Simon.

After a period in Denmark, Simon studied psychology in Vienna and worked as an academic in the United States. Having returned to Austria in 1963, she was appointed to the directorship of the Akademie für Sozialarbeit der Stadt Wien, an academy for social work in 1970. During her tenure, which lasted until 1983, the academy reformed Austrian social work education in accordance with contemporary professional standards. Simon is credited by the sociologist Barbara Louis with breaking "new ground for future generations [of female students]" (German: "für die nachfolgenden Generationen [von Studentinnen] ... wegweisend") in her field. She lived to the age of 103 and remained involved with her subject during retirement.

== Early life and education ==
Maria Dorothea Pollatschek was born into a Jewish family in Vienna on 6 August 1918. Her father Rudolf was a Bohemian engineer from Mnichovo Hradiště. Her mother Juliane, who came from a family of assimilated Jews in Vienna, was the first woman to study at the Exportakademie, a university for business and economics. Simon attended a primary school in Vienna's Börsegasse and later a gymnasium for daughters of civil servants. As a student, Simon joined the socialist Zionist youth movement Hashomer Hatzair.

It was on a skiing holiday put on by the organisation in 1934 that she met her future husband Joseph Simon, who was a member of the Austrian resistance to Nazism. He later joined the United States Army and helped prepare the Allied landing in Normandy. After the war, he worked as a jurist. Simon trained to be a preschool teacher from 1934 to 1936 but did not find employment in Austria. Because of her father's Bohemian origins, Simon held Czechoslovak citizenship and was able to move to Prague, where she continued her education at the Masarykschule für Sozial- und Gesundheitsfürsorge, an institute for social work supported by the Rockefeller Foundation.

In 1939, after Czechoslovakia was annexed by Germany, Simon emigrated to the United Kingdom, where she was supported by the Czech exile government and worked in a number of jobs, including as a maid and cleaner. From 1940, she was employed at the Hampstead Nurseries, a war nursery run by the psychoanalysts Dorothy Burlingham and Anna Freud, whom Simon had met during her training in Austria. Freud in particular was later acknowledged by Simon as a major influence on her work. Despite being primarily founded to alleviate the need for child care in war time, the Hampstead Nurseries also specialised in the development of new techniques for the study of child psychology. In 1941, she enrolled at the University of Oxford to study for a diploma in social work. In 1944, she completed the course and married Joseph Simon who had also emigrated from Austria. She joined the British Army, working as a teacher while studying economics and politics at the University of London via distance learning.

== Academic career ==
From 1945 to 1946, Simon lived with a host family in Denmark while her husband worked at the Embassy of the United States in Copenhagen. The couple's first of four children was born during this period. In 1946, she moved to Seattle and worked for the Jewish Family Welfare Service. She later stated that her experience with psychoanalysis, a popular field within psychology at the time, was a decisive factor in her hiring. Having obtained American citizenship, she returned to her native Austria in 1947, where she studied the teaching methods of the psychoanalysts August Aichhorn and Alfred Winterstein. She began working on a doctorate in psychology at the University of Vienna, which she completed in 1952. While living in Vienna, she worked for the American occupation forces as a labour advisor.

Since she did not find academic employment in Austria, Simon embarked on an academic career in the United States. From 1957 to 1961 she held an assistant professorship in clinical psychology at the University of Arkansas, taught courses with the Austrian psychiatrist Bruno Bettelheim at the University of Chicago, and was a guest lecturer at Hofstra University. Although she had better career prospects in the United States, Simon moved back to Austria in 1963 and joined the Institute for Advanced Studies in Vienna as a research assistant in sociology. During her time at the institute, she published interdisciplinary research including on family pathology, suicide, and the living conditions of unmarried mothers.

=== Directorship of the Akademie für Sozialarbeit ===
In 1970, Simon was appointed director of the Akademie für Sozialarbeit der Stadt Wien (Academy for Social Work of the City of Vienna), which in 2001 was merged into the University of Applied Sciences Campus Vienna. At the time of her appointment the academy suffered from low application numbers, which Simon attributed to "outdated" and " entirely inorganic" (German: "veralted ... und völlig unorganisch") instruction methods. During her tenure the academy reformed Austrian social work education in accordance with contemporary professional standards. These reforms included the introduction of new forms of teaching such as projects and interdisciplinary lessons, a student–staff liaison committee, and a more egalitarian admissions policy. Starting in 1971, Simon was the chairwoman of an alliance of directors of social work schools. The alliance lobbied the Ministry of Education to upgrade the status of its teaching institutes and to extend the length of social work courses from two to three years. While the schools were granted academy status and a modernised curriculum in 1976, the ministry did not agree to a course length extension.

Simon worked to embed Austria within international social work structures and contributed to the decision by the International Association of Schools of Social Work to base its headquarters in Vienna for ten years. She directed the academy until she reached the mandatory retirement age in 1983. According to a 2013 interview with Wiener Zeitung, she felt that she should not have left the position at that time and would have preferred to continue for another decade.

== Retirement and death ==
In her retirement, Simon remained active as the founder of Hilfe für Angehörige psychisch Erkrankter, a charity for the mentally ill and their families. She was also a Senior Representative at the World Federation for Mental Health. As of 2018, she lived in Vienna's Döbling district and had spent more than a third of her lifetime in retirement. Simon died in Vienna on 8 March 2022, at the age of 103.

== Legacy ==
The sociologist Barbara Louis describes Simon's contribution to the development of Austrian social work during her directorship as "fundamental and enduring" (German: "fundamental und nachhaltig"). Discussing her accomplishments as a lecturer, she credits Simon with having combined her international academic experience with innovative teaching methods. This combination allowed her to open new perspectives to Austrian students in a time when modes of instruction were generally conservative. According to Louis, Simon "broke new ground for future generations [of female students]" (German: "für die nachfolgenden Generationen [von Studentinnen] ... wegweisend") in her field. In a volume on the Austrian scholar of social work Ilse Arlt, the sociologists Peter Pantucek and Maria Maiss label Simon as a "legend" (German: "Legende") in her field, writing that both Simon and Arlt viewed social work and its study as a "continuation of the Enlightenment project" (German: "Fortführung des Projekts der Aufklärung").
