= Valentin Dasch =

German politician

Member of the Bundestag; for Altötting
- In office 20 October 1969 – 15 September 1972
- Preceded by: Josef Bauer
- Succeeded by: Herbert Prochazka

Member of the Landtag of Bavaria; for Upper Bavaria
- In office 2 December 1966 – 18 December 1969
- Preceded by: Multi-member district
- Succeeded by: Alfons Weinzierl

Personal details
- Born: 1 May 1930 Oberbergkirchen, Germany
- Died: 2 August 1981 (aged 51) Zangberg, West Germany
- Party: Christian Social Union
- Children: 10

Valentin Dasch (1 May 1930 – 2 August 1981) was a German politician, representative of the Christian Social Union in Bavaria.

He was a member of the Landtag of Bavaria from 1966 to 1969 and from 1969 to 1972 a member of the national Bundestag.

== See also ==
- List of Bavarian Christian Social Union politicians
