= Fredrick Terna =

Painter (1923–2022)

- Born: October 8, 1923; Vienna, Austria
- Died: December 8, 2022 (aged 99); New York City, New York, U.S.

Frederick Terna (October 8, 1923 – December 8, 2022) was an Austrian-born American painter and Holocaust survivor who lived for many years in Brooklyn, New York.

== Early life and Shoah ==
Frederick Terna was born Friedrich Arthur Taussig to Jochanan "Jan" and Lona (née Herzog) Taussig in Vienna on October 8, 1923. In 1926, his brother Tomáš "Tommy" was born. Later that year, the family moved back to their hometown of Prague. After the German invasion of 1939, the brothers Fred and Tommy were barred from attending school as Jews. Terna's family went into hiding in the Czech countryside and acquired false identities changing their name to "Terna" from "Taussig." The false identity was discovered in 1941 and the family was sent to concentration camps. Terna was interned at the Lípa forced labor camp from October of that year to March 1943. He was then transferred to the Theresienstadt concentration camp, where he was briefly reunited with his father, who had been deported to Theresienstadt in December 1941. In the fall of 1944 Terna was deported to Auschwitz. Towards the end of 1944 he was transferred again to Kaufering, a sub-camp of Dachau. He was liberated in April 1945 and spent the next few months in a hospital. His entire family was murdered in the Shoah.

== Later life and artistic career ==
In 1946 Terna went to Paris and studied painting at the Académie de la Grande Chaumière and at the Académie Julian. In 1952 he moved to New York City, where he lived for the remainder of his life. His artistic oeuvre dealt with his experiences in the concentration camps and with themes of Jewish thought and history. His paintings are part of important public and private collections, including the Smithsonian Institution and the Albertina. Terna has taught a course on the history of Jewish art at the New School.

Terna died on December 8, 2022, at the age of 99. Terna's funeral was held at Kane Street Synagogue in Brooklyn, where he had been a longtime member.
