= Hermann Fillitz =

Austrian art historian (1924–2022)

Hermann Fillitz (20 April 1924 – 14 June 2022) was an Austrian art historian.
