= Friedrich Kurrent =

Austrian architect and author (1931–2022)

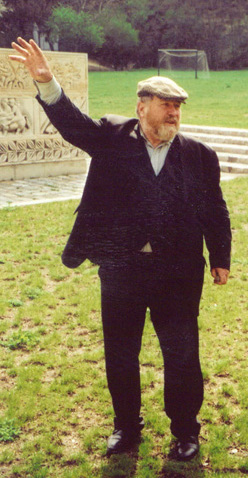
- Kurrent c. 2004
- Born: 10 September 1931; Hintersee, Austria
- Died: 10 January 2022 (aged 90)
- Occupations: Architect; Author

Friedrich Kurrent (10 September 1931 – 10 January 2022) was an Austrian architect and author.

== Biography ==
Friedrich Kurrent attended the Gewerbeschule Salzburg and studied architecture at the Academy of Fine Arts Vienna under Clemens Holzmeister. In 1950, together with Wilhelm Holzbauer, Otto Leitner, and Johannes Spalt, he co-founded the architecture collective arbeitsgruppe 4. The group is considered to have played a significant role in redefining Austrian architecture in the post-war period.

Kurrent was particularly engaged in efforts to preserve historically significant buildings, often opposing their demolition. One of his personal ambitions, the construction of a new synagogue at Vienna's Schmerlingplatz, remained unrealized.

In parallel with his architectural practice, Kurrent also pursued a career in teaching, exerting considerable influence on future generations of architects, including in Germany. From 1968 to 1971, he worked as an assistant to Ernst A. Plischke at the Academy of Fine Arts Vienna. In 1973, he succeeded Johannes Ludwig as full professor at the Chair of Design and Spatial Planning at the Technical University of Munich. Starting in 1976, he also taught sacred architecture as the successor to Josef Wiedemann at the same university. From 1981 to 1983, he served as dean of the Faculty of Architecture, and he retired in 1996.

As a member of the architectural collective "ARGE Architekten Altes AKH", Kurrent played a leading role in converting the Old General Hospital (Altes AKH) in Vienna into a university campus. In addition to his teaching and architectural work, he actively promoted architecture and building culture to the broader public. In 1965, he co-founded the Austrian Society for Architecture as one of its more outspoken founding members. He also collaborated with the Wittmann furniture workshops. He was also a member of the Bayerische Akademie der Schönen Künste.

In 1958, Kurrent met his future wife, sculptor and ceramic artist Maria Biljan-Bilger. In Sommerein, where they lived, he designed the Maria Biljan-Bilger Exhibition Hall, completed in 2004, as a permanent space to preserve and exhibit her extensive body of work.

Kurrent died on 10 January 2022, at the age of 90.

== Works ==
- Parscher Pfarrkirche Zum Kostbaren Blut in Salzburg (1956)
- Pfarrkirche Steyr-Ennsleite in Steyr (1961)
- Kolleg St. Josef Salzburg-Aigen in Aigen (1964)
- Zentralsparkasse Floridsdorf in Floridsdorf (1974)
- Wohnhaus Nobilegasse in Vienna (1987)
- Kino Liliom in Augsburg (1989)
- Bergkapelle in Ramingstein (1991)
- Wohnturm in Krems an der Donau (1995)
- Evangelische Segenskirche in Aschheim (1997)
- Katholische Pfarrkirche Sankt Laurentius in Kirchham (1998)
- Maria Biljan-Bilger Ausstellungshalle Sommerein in Sommerein (2004)

== Awards ==
- City of Vienna Prize for Architecture (1979)
- Austrian Decoration for Science and Art (1997)
- Decoration of Honour for Services to the Republic of Austria (2017)
