= Maria L. Marcus =

American lawyer (1933–2022)

- Born: Maria Eleanor Erica Lenhoff; June 23, 1933; Vienna, Austria
- Died: April 27, 2022 (aged 88)
- Education: Oberlin College; Yale Law School
- Occupations: Lawyer; professor
- Spouse: Norman Marcus (m. 1956; died 2008)

Maria L. Marcus (June 23, 1933 – April 27, 2022) was an American lawyer who served as a Joseph M. McLaughlin Professor of Law at Fordham University.

== Early life and family ==
Marcus was born as Maria Eleanor Erica Lenhoff on 23 June 1933 in Vienna, Austria in a Jewish family. Her father was Arthur Lenhoff an Austrian supreme court justice who was thrown out of the court for his religion in 1938. Marcus and her family fled to America under the guise of a ski trip when she was 6 to escape Nazi persecution. She received a bachelor's degree in English from Oberlin College in 1954 and a law degree from Yale Law School in 1957. She was married to Norman Marcus.

== Career ==
Between 1961 and 1967, Marcus was an associate counsel for the NAACP. From 1967 to 1978, she was an Assistant Attorney General. In 1976, she became the chief of the office's litigation bureau where she worked until 1978.

In 1978, she joined Fordham University as a professor and became the second woman to attain tenured full professor status.

In 2011, she was retired as a professor.

== Publications ==
- Austria's Pre-War Brown v. Board of Education
- Foreword: Is There a Threat to Judicial Independence in the United States Today
- Policing Speech on the Airwaves: Granting Rights, Preventing Wrongs
- Learning Together: Justice Marshall's Desegregation Opinions
- Wanted: A Federal Standard for Evaluating the Adequate State Forum
- Federal Habeas Corpus After State Court Default: A Definition of Cause and Prejudice
- Conjugal Violence: The Law of Force and the Force of Law
