= Herbert Thalhammer =

Austrian politician (1955–2022)

Member of the Landtag of Vorarlberg
- In office 7 October 1987 – 23 October 1989

Personal details
- Born: 12 July 1955 Hallstatt, Allied-occupied Austria
- Died: 6 February 2022 (aged 66)
- Party: The Greens – The Green Alternative
- Education: Vorarlberg Teaching University

Herbert Thalhammer (12 July 1955 – 6 February 2022) was an Austrian politician.

A member of The Greens – The Green Alternative, he served in the Vorarlberg Teaching University from 1987 to 1989. He died on 6 February 2022, at the age of 66.
