= Toni Stricker =

Austrian composer (1930–2022)

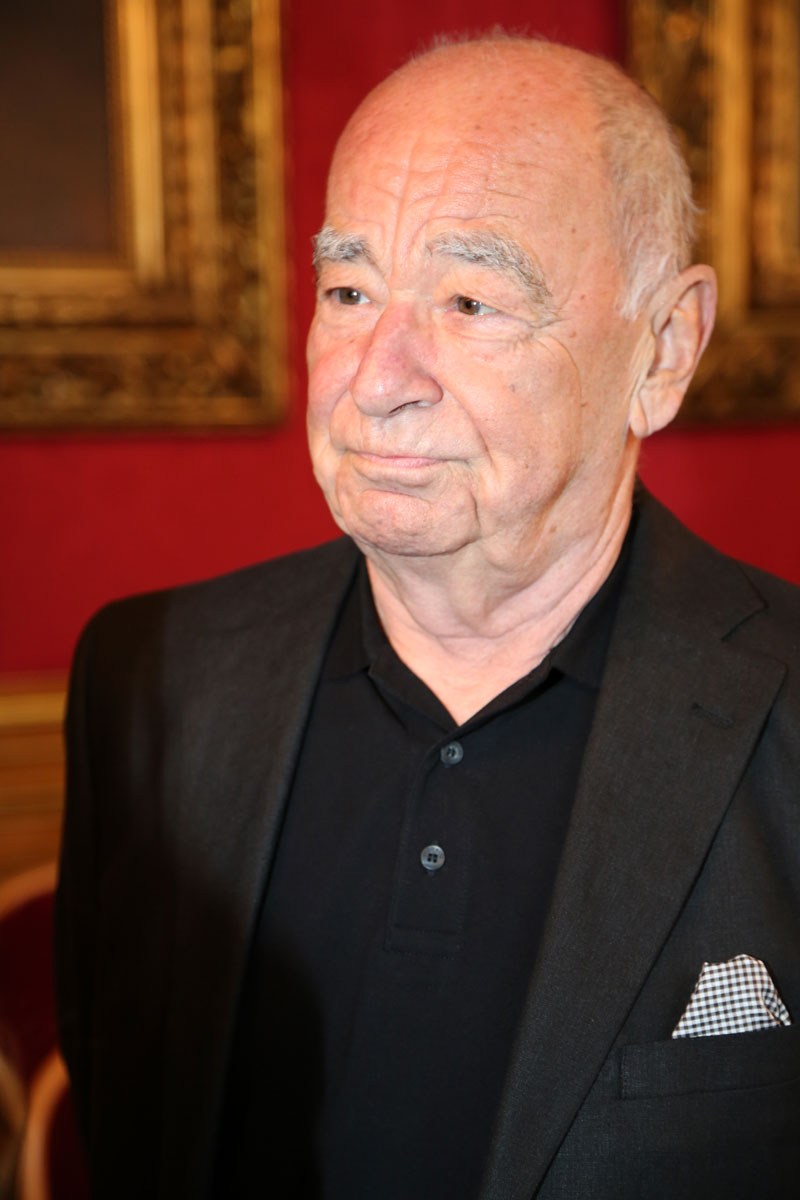

Background information
- Born: 4 April 1930; Vienna, Austria
- Died: 16 February 2022 (aged 91) Bad Sauerbrunn, Austria
- Years active: 1957–2015

Toni Stricker (4 April 1930 – 16 February 2022) was an Austrian composer and violinist. He died on 16 February 2022, at the age of 91.
