= Josef Bauer (artist) =

Austrian artist (1934–2022)

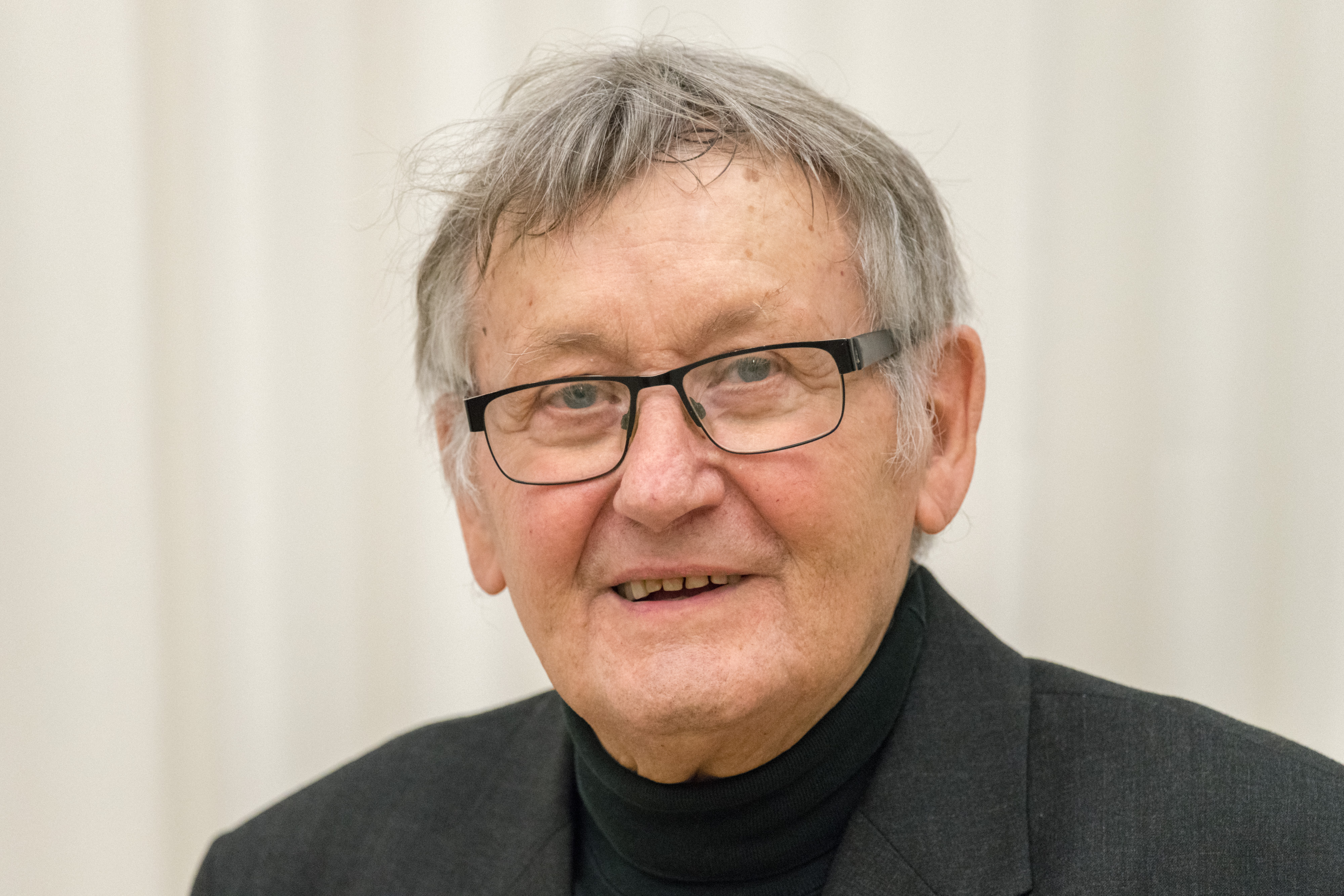
- Josef Bauer in 2019
- Born: 12 January 1934; Wels, Austria
- Died: 3 March 2022 (aged 88)
- Occupation: Artist

Josef Bauer (12 January 1934 – 3 March 2022) was an Austrian artist.

== Life and work ==
Bauer was born in Wels, Austria, on 12 January 1934. After his studies of painting in the school of arts in Linz, the main artistic style of his works became the so-called tactile poetry. In 1994 Bauer was awarded the cultural award of Linz and one year later the cultural award of Upper Austria for fine arts.

Bauer died on 3 March 2022, at the age of 88.

== Exhibitions (extract) ==
- 2005 Galerie Eder, "Die 70er Jahre", Linz
- 2002 Galerie Atrium, "Bilder, Objekte Installationen", Kremsmünster
- 1998 Galerie MAERZ, "Hinzufügungen", Linz
- 1994 Bielefelder Kunstverein
- 1992 OÖ. Landesgalerie, Linz
- 1990 Studio allerArt, [Dorn]
- 1986 Galerie Flutlicht, Vienna
- 1985 Stadtgalerie Bielefeld
- 1979 Kunstmuseum Hannover
- 1978 Galerie Nächst St. Stephan, Vienna
- Galerie Festetics, Salzburg
- 1974 Neue Galerie am Landesmuseum Joanneum, Graz
- 1970 Galerie im Griechenbeisl, Vienna
- 1968 Schloß Parz bei Grieskirchen
- Galerie im Griechenbeisl, Vienna

== Bibliography ==
- Farbnamen with a preface by Burghard Schmidt. (Linz 2005)
- Farbnamen (Linz: Eigenverlag, 2004)
- Bilder, Objekte, Installationen, 1985–1998. (Linz 1998)
- Ausstellungskatalog. (Linz: Landesgalerie, 1992)
- Zeile für Zeile / Line by Line. Monographie. (Linz: edition neue texte, 1977)
- Taktile Poesie 1965 bis 1974. Ausstellungskatalog. (Graz: Neue Glaerie am Landesmuseum Johanneum Graz, 1974)
- Hinstellungen. Ausstellungskatalog. (Vienna: Galerie im Griechenbeisl, 1968)
