= Wasserburg am Inn (district) =

- District
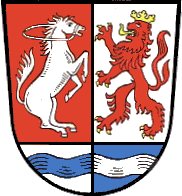
- Coat of arms
- Interactive map of Wasserburg am Inn
- Country: Germany
- State: Bavaria
- Adm. region: Upper Bavaria
- Disbanded: 1 June 1972
- Capital: Wasserburg am Inn
- Time zone: UTC+01:00 (CET)
  - Summer (DST): UTC+02:00 (CEST)
- Vehicle registration: WS

Wasserburg am Inn is a former German district (Landkreis) in Oberbayern. The district encompassed the historical region of the County of Haag and Wasserburg. The district was disestablished on June 1, 1972, as part of the district reform in Bavaria. Its territory was distributed among the districts of Rosenheim, Mühldorf am Inn, Erding, and Ebersberg. The district contained 4 market towns and 22 rural municipalities. The district administration was located in the town of Wasserburg am Inn.
