= 2022 in Norway =

- Centuries: 19th; 20th; 21st
- Decades: 2000s; 2010s; 2020s
- See also: List of years in Norway

Events in the year 2022 in Norway.

== Overview ==
The year was dominated by the Russian invasion of Ukraine. Norway took in Ukrainian refugees fleeing the invasion of their country. Norwegian government sent foreign aid to Ukraine, and condemned and sanctioned Russia for waging the war.

As the rest of Europe and in the world, Norway continued to be affected by the COVID-19 pandemic and Delta cron hybrid variant, but much less so than in January 2020 and February 2022. The 2021–2023 inflation surge led to increased prices on many goods.

== Incumbents ==
- Monarch – Harald V.
- President of the Storting – Masud Gharahkhani (Labour).
- Prime Minister – Jonas Gahr Støre (Labour).

== Events ==
Ongoing – COVID-19 pandemic in Norway

=== January ===
- 24 January – The daily number of COVID-19 Deltacron infections has peaked in Norway.

=== February ===
- 1 February – Norway lifts almost all remaining COVID-19-related restrictions except for face mask rules due to the country's high vaccination rate.
- 25 February –
  - Norway joined Denmark and Sweden were transition to the living with COVID-19 endemic phase.
  - Ukrainians, Norwegians, and Russians hold a joint anti-war protest in Kirkenes, Norway, calling for Vladimir Putin to be tried at the International Criminal Court at The Hague, Netherlands.

=== March ===
- 7 March – One person dies and seven crew members are rescued after a fishing trawler capsizes in the North Sea while travelling to Norway, according to the Norwegian Coast Guard.
- 18 March – Four crew members are killed as a United States Marine Corps MV-22B Osprey aircraft crashes in Beiarn Municipality, Norway, while participating in the NATO military exercise Cold Response.
- 22 March – Despite Deltacron cases fall, King Harald V tests positive for Delta cron hybrid variant of COVID-19.

=== May ===
- 20 May – Three people are wounded, one critically, in a stabbing attack in Nore og Uvdal Municipality, Norway. Police say that the attack was due to a domestic dispute between the perpetrator and his wife.
- 31 May – Monkey pox detected for the first time in Norway.

=== June ===
- 1 June –
  - The Storting votes against a proposal to give 16-year-olds voting rights in municipal and county council elections.
  - The Storting votes against a proposal to amend the Constitution by opening up for a republic in Norway.
- 2 June –
  - Peggy Hessen Følsvik is elected as LO leader for three years, after she has been acting leader since March 2022.
  - Hans Sverre Sjøvold resigns as head of PST.
- 3 June –
  - Parliament adopts a defense agreement with the United States, where it establishes "agreed areas" at Rygge, Sola and Evenes Air Station, and at Ramsund Naval Station. In these areas, can the US establish military infrastructure, after approval by Norway. The infrastructure will become Norwegian property.
  - LO's congress decides to work for an international boycott of Israel.
- 7 June – Princess Märtha Louise and Durek Verrett announce their engagement.
- 9 June – The Cause of Death Registry reports 241 deaths of overdose for 2021, the lowest number since 2013.
- 10 June –
  - The government decided to terminate the contract for the Norwegian Defense' 14 NH90 helicopters, deliver back the helicopters that have been delivered, and claim back NOK 5 billion from the supplier because the delivery is delayed.
  - NHO and Finance Norway decide to merge.
- 11 June – The new National Museum of Art, Architecture and Design opens in Vika, Oslo.
- 14 June – The Norwegian Parliament decided that the counties of Viken, Vestfold and Telemark and Troms and Finnmark, as well as Ålesund municipality, will be split up from 1 January 2024.
- 15 June – Electric scooters are reclassified from "bicycle" to "motor vehicle", and thus gets an alcohol limit of 0.2, an age limit of 12 years and a helmet requirement for children under the age of 15.
- 24 June – Kongsberg attack: A court in Norway finds the attacker not criminally responsible due to paranoid schizophrenia and sentences him to compulsory mental treatment.
- 25 June – The mass shooting in Oslo 2022.
- 29 June – A major data attack (denial of service attack) affected many Norwegian websites, such as Altinn, ID-porten, NRK, Politiet, Arbeidstilsynet and NAV. The attack was early on linked to a Russian hacker group, Killnet.

=== July ===
- 1 July –
  - Ferry crossings with less than 100,000 passengers per year (52 county road ferries and seven national road ferries) will be free to use.
  - Svalbard: The government introduces a requirement of 3 years residence in Norway to have the right to vote in the Longyearbyen Local Government, and to be eligible for election in the Local Government. The requirement goes to persons who are not Norwegian citizens.
- 5 July – Foreign Minister Anniken Huitfeldt formally signed Norway's approval of Finland and Sweden's applications for membership in NATO.
- 6 July – A new data attack (DDoS) affects several Norwegian newspapers, such as VG, Bergens Tidende, Aftenposten and Stavanger Aftenblad, which experienced a few hours with instability due to this.
- 22 July – The Norwegian Public Roads Administration reports 63 deaths in traffic in Norway in the first half of the year, a doubling from the same period in 2021, the number was 31.

=== August ===
- 14 August – The walrus Freya, who had been observed in several countries around the North Sea since 2019, was killed by the Directorate of Fisheries in Frognerkilen in Oslo.
- 22 August – The new rescue helicopter base in Tromsø Municipality was opened.

=== September ===
- 27 September –
  - Norway raises its "emergency preparedness" in response to sightings of "unidentified drones" near its offshore oil and gas facilities in the North Sea, and is coordinating with its armed forces, police, and oil and gas industry operators, according to energy minister Terje Aasland.
  - Leaders from Poland, Norway and Denmark hold a ceremony to open the Baltic Pipe natural gas pipeline that will transport natural gas from the Norwegian shelf via Denmark to Poland.

=== October ===
- 31 October – Two people are killed and another is injured by a helicopter crash in Verdal Municipality in Trøndelag.

=== December ===
- 12 December – A medieval ship is discovered at the bottom of the large lake Mjøsa.
- 15 December – Viggo Kristiansen was officially acquitted of the Baneheia case, by the Borgarting Court of Appeal.

== Sports ==
- Norway at the 2022 Winter Olympics

== Deaths ==
=== January ===
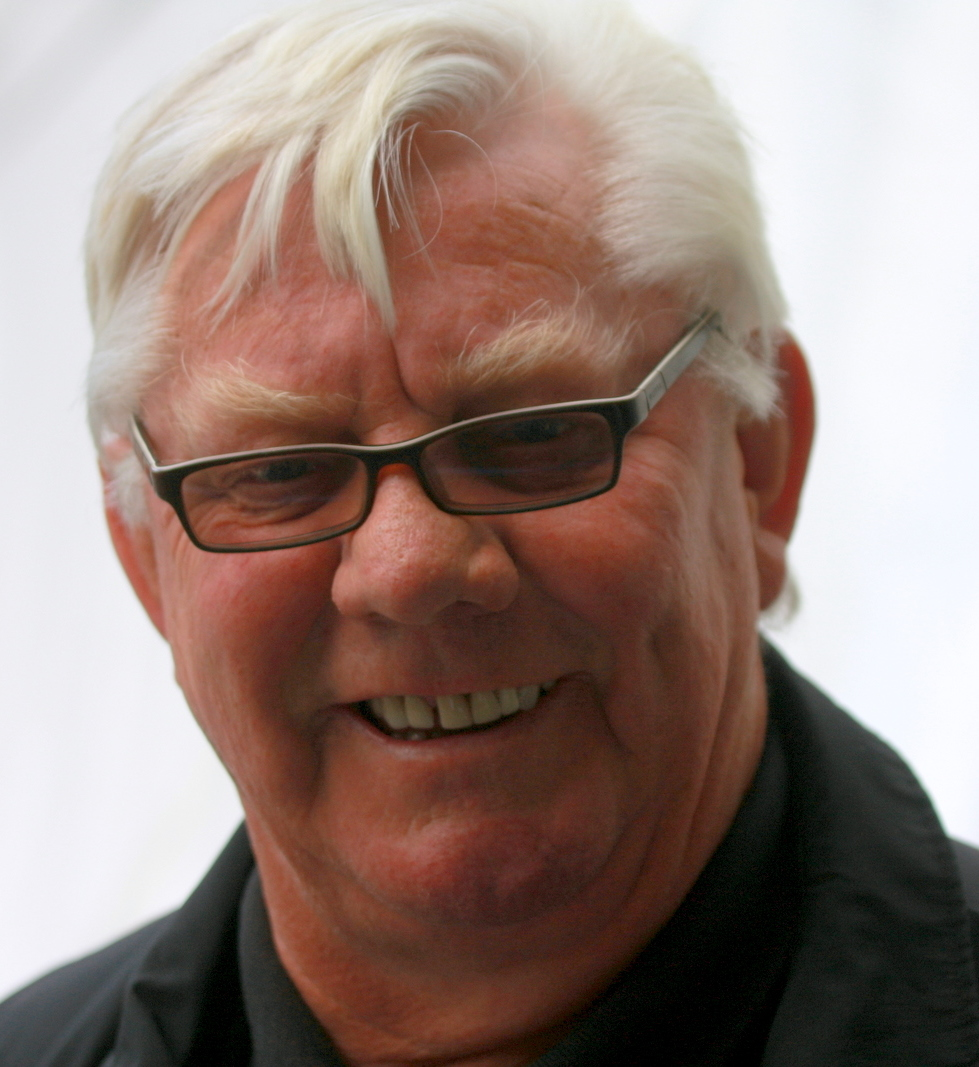
Nils Arne Eggen, manager for Rosenborg

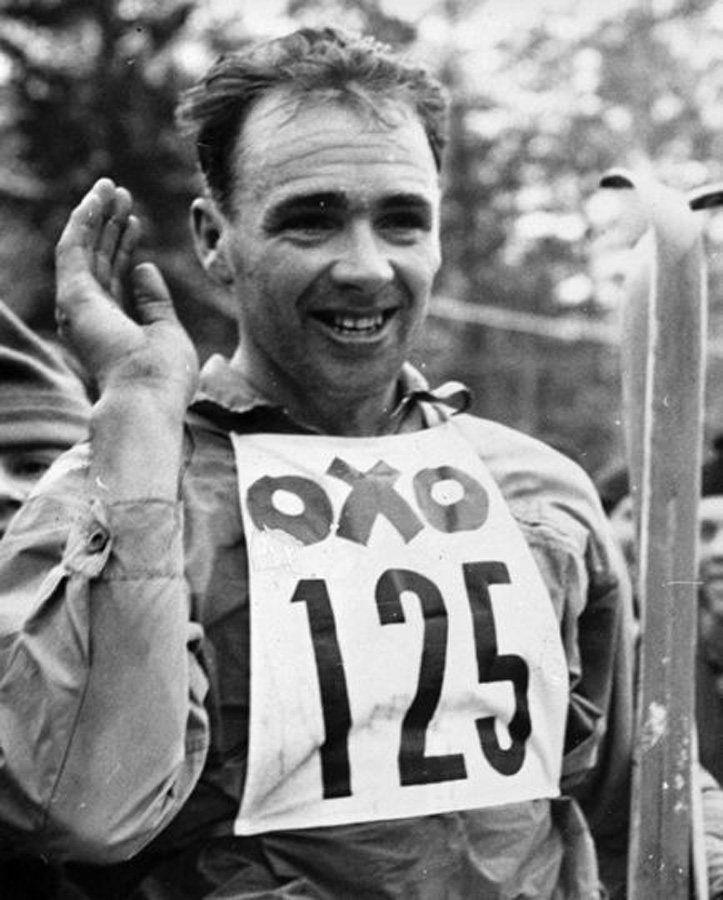
Sverre Stensheim

- 5 January – Arnljot Strømme Svendsen, economist, politician and writer (born 1921).
- 5 January – Sverre Bentzen, actor (born 1941).
- 9 January – Nils Henrik Måsø, politician (born 1952).
- 10 January – Nils A. Røhne, politician (born 1949).
- 10 January – Øystein Lønn, writer (born 1936).
- 11 January – Liv Lundberg, author (born 1944).
- 12 January – Jan Einar Greve, lawyer (born 1933).
- 17 January – Reidar Webster, civil servant (born 1935).
- 18 January – Arvid Nyberg, politician (born 1928).
- 19 January – Nils Arne Eggen, football manager (born 1941).
- 21 January – Gerd Høsteng, politician (born 1945).
- 22 January – Sverre Stensheim, cross-country skier (born 1933).

=== February ===
- 5 February – Per Christian Hemmer, physicist (born 1933).
- 13 February – Berit Berthelsen, athlete (born 1944).
- 16 February – Erling Brandsnes, politician (born 1945).
- 20 February – Magnus Thue, politician (born 1980).
- 23 February – Per Voigt, ice hockey player (born 1951).
- 27 February – Ketil Børde, diplomat (born 1935).

=== March ===
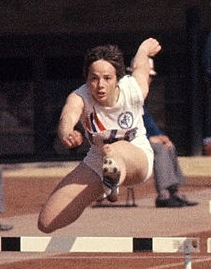
Oddrun Hokland

- 3 March – Oddvar J. Majala, politician (born 1932).
- 5 March – Nils Dag Strømme, boxer (born 1945).
- 10 March – Magne Landrø, sport shooter (born 1937).
- 10 March – Borghild Hillestad, politician (born 1936).
- 14 March – Morten Schakenda, chef (born 1966).
- 17 March – Ingeborg Botnen, librarian and politician (born 1934).
- 18 March – Olav Eldholm, geophysicist (born 1941).
- 18 March – Oddrun Hokland, athlete and organizational leader (born 1942).
- 18 March – Åge Sørensen, footballer (born 1937).
- 27 March – Marit Rotnes, politician (born 1928).
- 28 March – David Vikøren, shipping executive (born 1926).
- 30 March – Roar Høyland, industrial designer (born 1930).

=== April ===
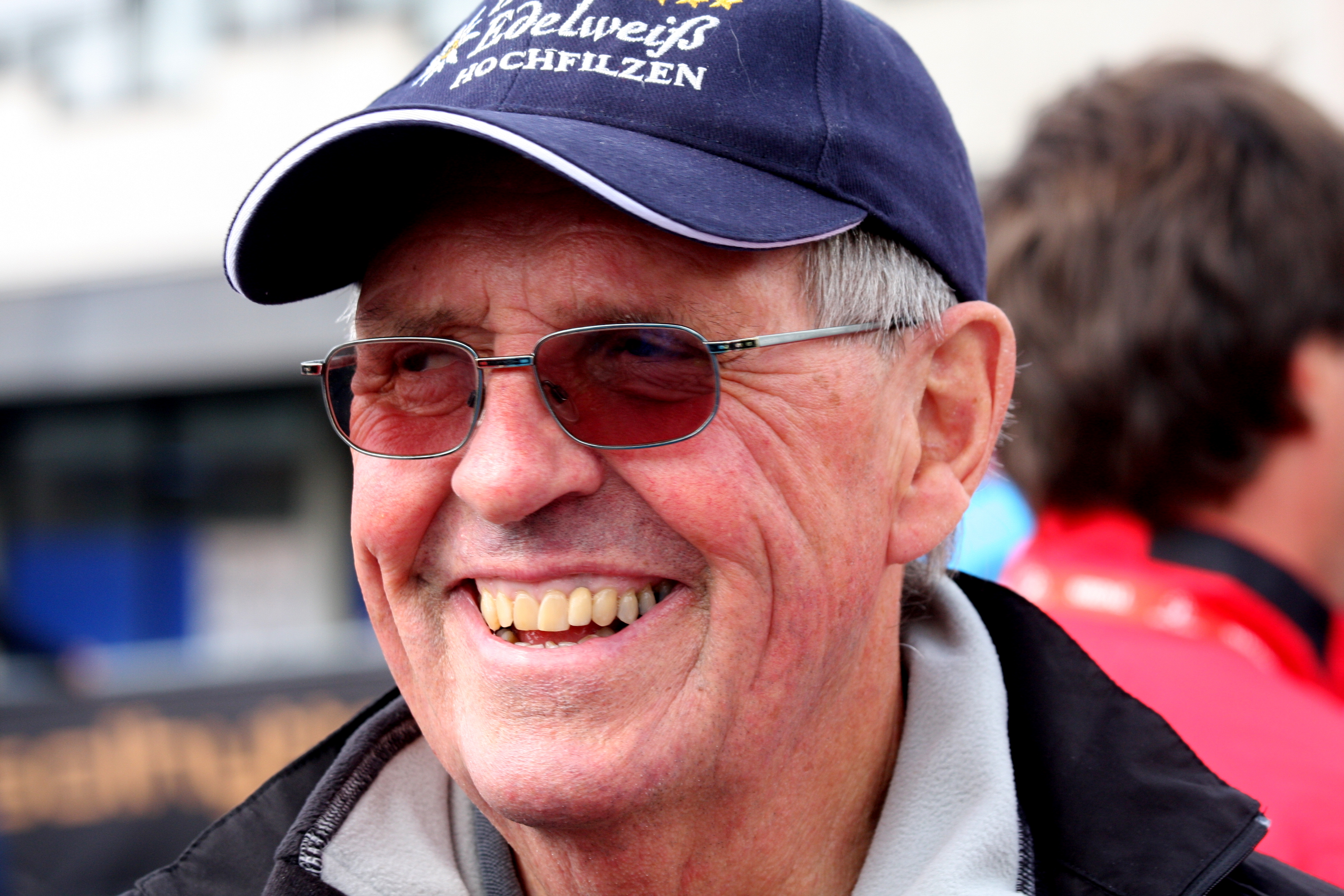
Jon Herwig Carlsen

- 3 April – Einar Østby, cross-country skier (born 1935).
- 10 April – Jon Herwig Carlsen, sports commentator (born 1937).
- 12 April – Arne Zwaig, chess player (born 1947).
- 14 April – Trygve Thue, guitarist and music producer (born 1950).
- 16 April – Sivert Langholm, historian (born 1927).
- 22 April – Synnøve Liaaen Jensen, chemist (born 1932).

=== May ===
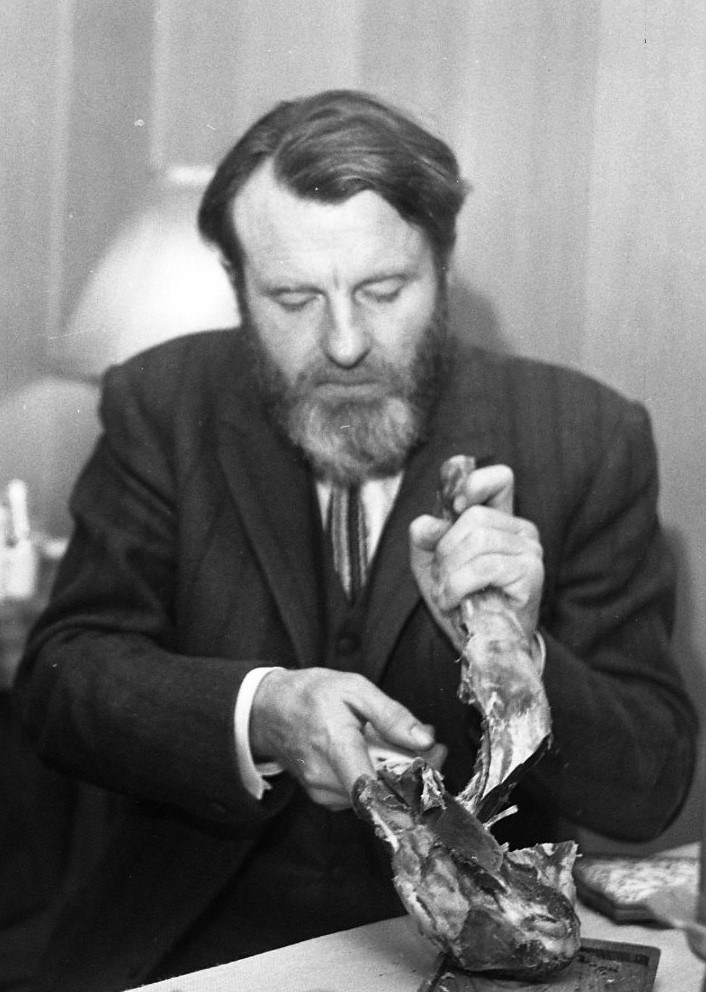
Norvald Tveit

- 1 May – Aage Müller-Nilssen, priest (born 1940).
- 2 May – Norvald Tveit, writer and playwright (born 1927).
- 5 May – Gunnar Sandborg, rower (born 1927).
- 16 May – Kjellaug Nakkim, politician (born 1940).
- 17 May – Johan Kleppe, veterinarian and politician (born 1928).
- 18 May – Alf Saltveit, writer (born 1946).
- 24 May – Thomas Ulsrud, curler (born 1971).

=== June ===
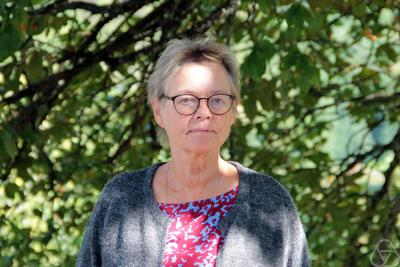
Berit Stensønes

- 3 June – Kari Frisell, operatic soprano and pedagogue (born 1922).
- 5 June –
  - Oddleif Olavsen, politician (born 1945).
  - Berit Stensønes, mathematician (born 1956).
- 16 June – Steinar Amundsen, sprint canoeist (born 1945).
- 22 June – Gerd Grønvold Saue, journalist and novelist (born 1930).

=== July ===
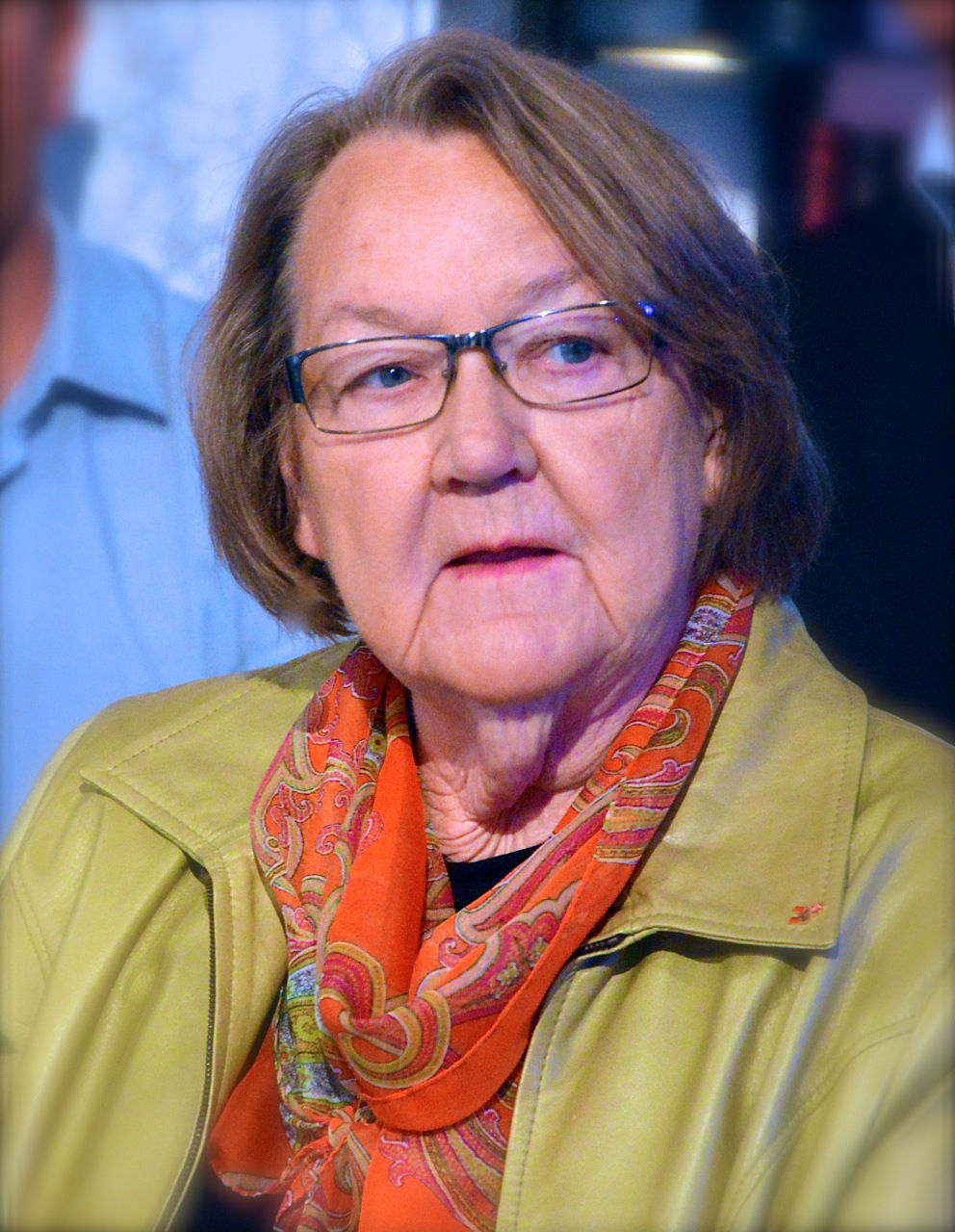
Marit Paulsen

- 10 July – Bjørn Inge Mo, politician (born 1968).
- 14 July – Gunnar Mathisen, politician (born 1936).
- 15 July – Knut Korsæth, educator and politician (born 1932).
- 16 July – Egil Bakke, civil servant (born 1927).
- 25 July – Geir Børresen, actor and entertainer (born 1942).
- 26 July – Marit Paulsen, writer and politician (born 1939, died in Sweden).
- 29 July – Svein Eirik Fauskevåg, literary historian (born 1942).

=== August ===
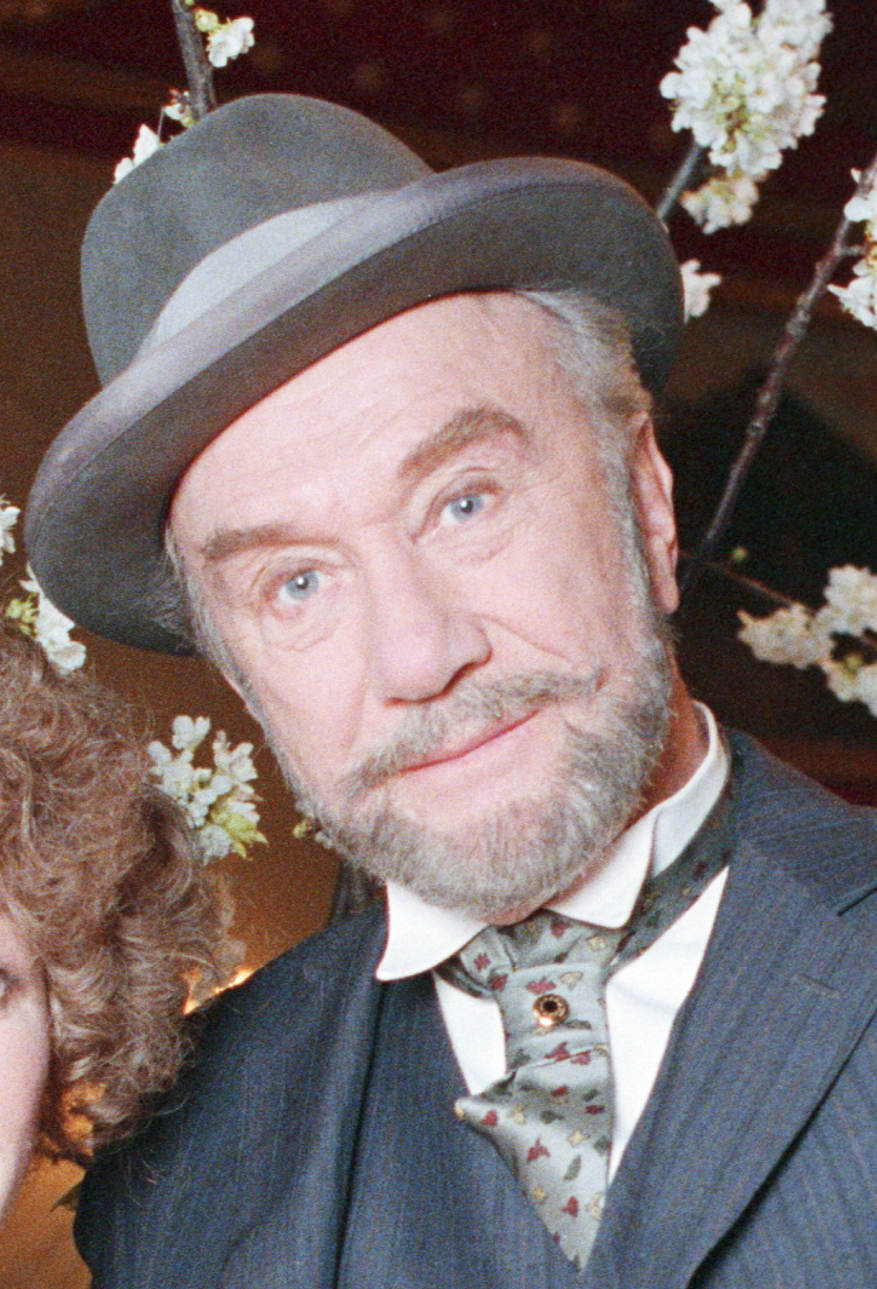
Espen Skjønberg

- 4 August – Thorleif Andresen, cyclist (born 1945).
- 8 August – Per Jansen, actor (born 1941).
- 14 August – Arne Legernes, footballer (born 1931).
- 16 August – Odd Reinsfelt, politician (born 1941).
- 19 August – Per Knutsen, writer and playwright (born 1951).
- 20 August – Audun Heimdal, orienteering and ski orienteering competitor (born 1997).
- 21 August – Astrid Hansen, orienteering competitor (born 1933).
- 26 August – Espen Skjønberg, actor (born 1924).

=== September ===
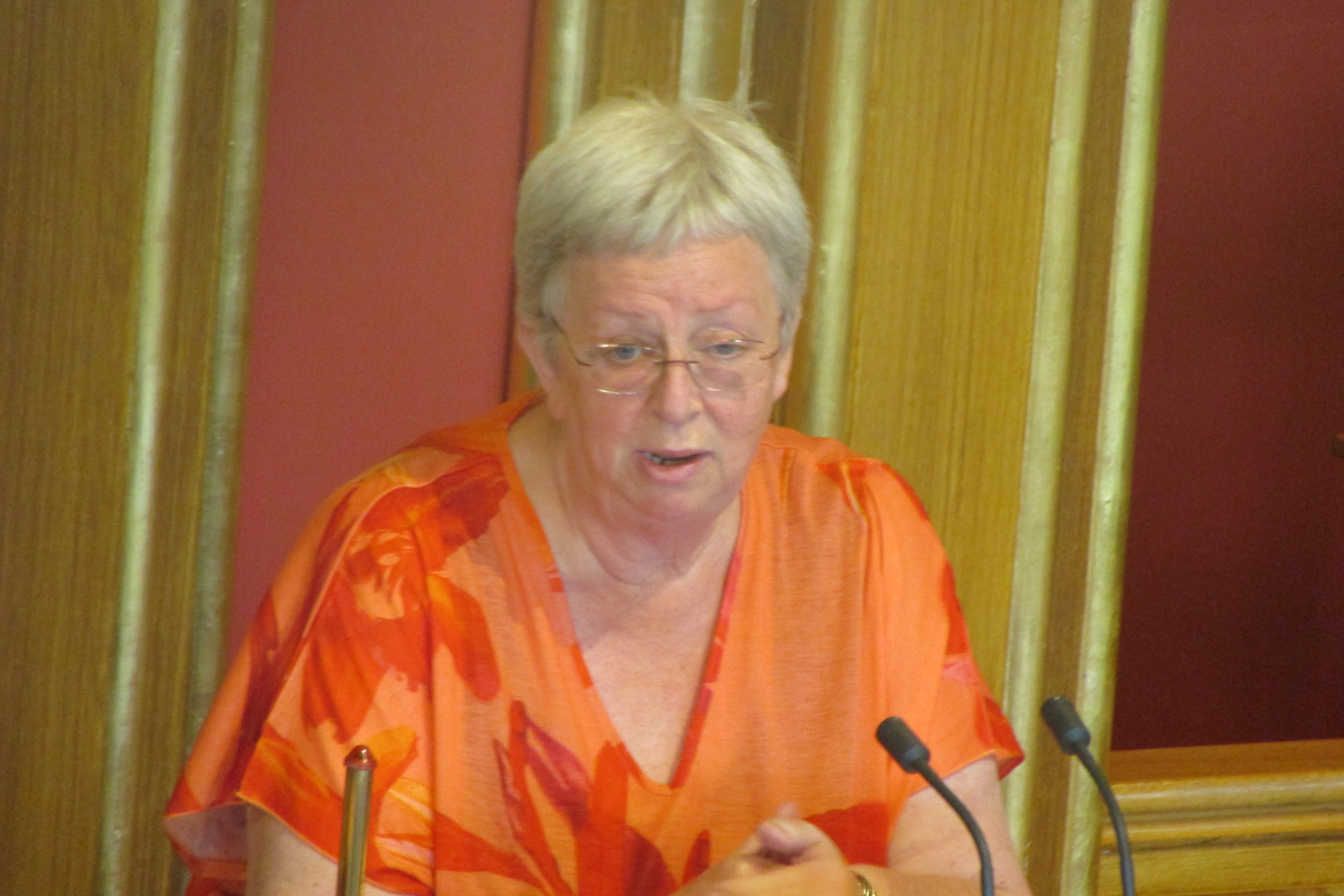
Torhild Bransdal

- 3 September – Eva Børresen, ceramist (born 1920).
- 6 September – John S. Tveit, politician (born 1931).
- 12 September – Britt Hildeng, politician (born 1943).
- 15 September – Nils Christian Moe-Repstad, poet (born 1972).
- 28 September – Torhild Bransdal, politician (born 1956).
- 29 September – Egil Bjerklund, ice hockey player (born 1933).
- 29 September – Marit Christensen, journalist (born 1948).
- 30 September – Martin Stavrum, politician (born 1938).

=== October ===
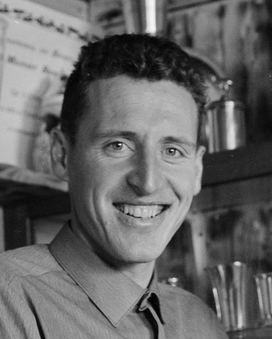
Ole Ellefsæter

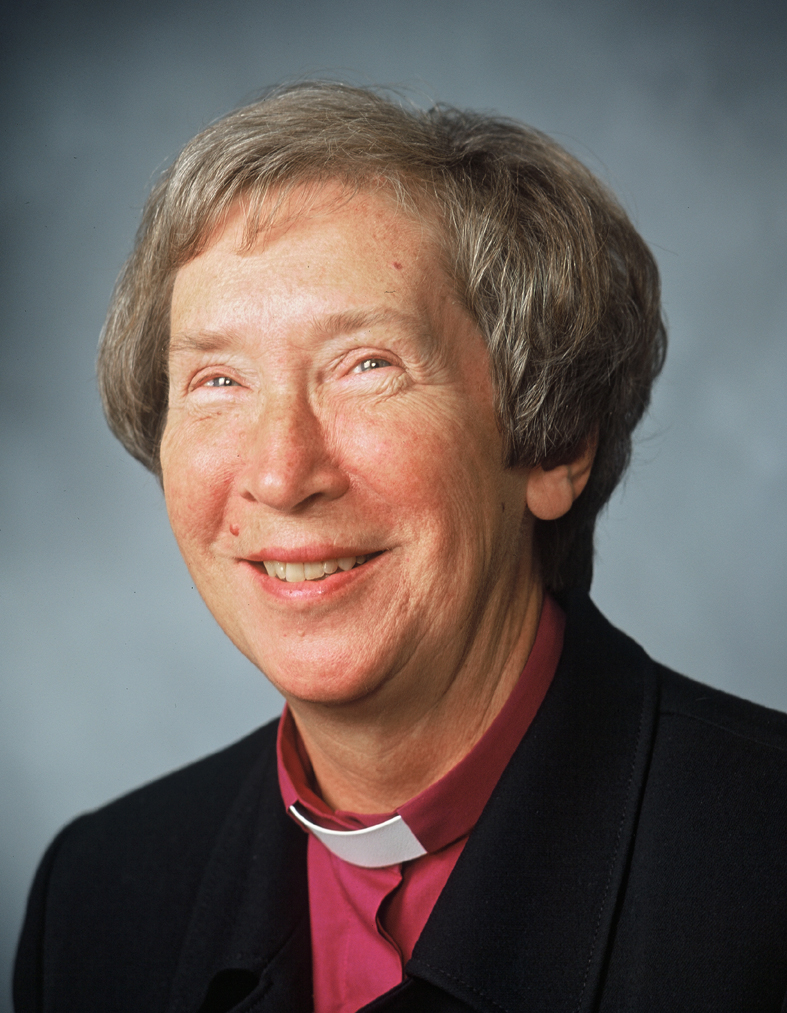
Rosemarie Köhn

- 2 October – Bjarne Mørk Eidem, politician and civil servant (born 1936).
- 3 October – Per Bredesen, footballer (born 1930).
- 6 October – Carl Fredrik Bunæs, sprinter (born 1939).
- 7 October – Torfinn Bjarkøy, civil servant (born 1952).
- 11 October – Frøydis Armand, actress (born 1949).
- 13 October – Halvor Næs, ski jumper (born 1928).
- 18 October – Ole Ellefsæter, cross country skier (born 1939).
- 22 October – Aksel Nærstad, politician (born 1952).
- 27 October – Fritz Huitfeldt, politician (born 1939).
- 30 October
  - Rosemarie Köhn, bishop (born 1939).
  - Reza Rezaee, politician (born 1960).

=== November ===
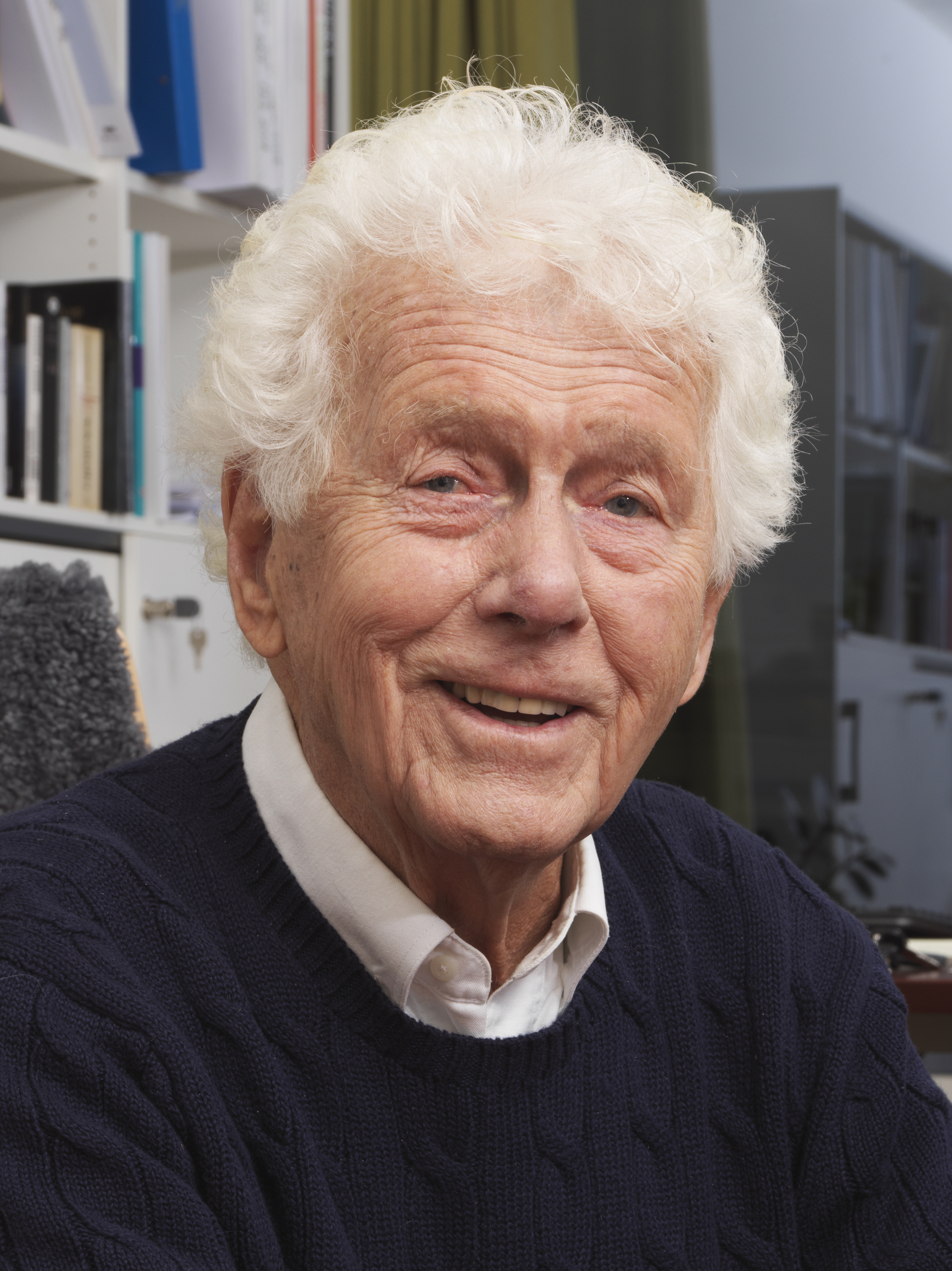
Toralv Maurstad

- 2 November – Jakob Eng, politician (born 1937).
- 4 November – Toralv Maurstad, actor (born 1926).
- 6 November – Tomm Kristiansen, journalist and writer (born 1950).
- 9 November – Mattis Hætta, singer (born 1959).
- 11 November – Per Flatberg, environmentalist (born 1937).
- 17 November – Annika Biørnstad, media executive (born 1957).
- 18 November – Per Arne Olsen, politician (born 1961).
- 29 November – Sigurd Frisvold, military officer (born 1947)

=== December ===
- 4 December – Gino Scarpa, printer (born 1924)
- 12 December – Erik Tønseth, industrialist (born 1946)
- 22 December – Odd-Bjørn Fure, historian (born 1942)
- 29 December – Shabana Rehman, comedian (born 1976).
- 31 December – Knut Hanselmann, politician (born 1946).
