= Hemmer =

Hemmer is a surname. Notable people with the surname include:

- Bill Hemmer (born 1964), American television news anchor
- Caleb Hemmer (born 1981), American politician from Tennessee, U.S.
- Frank Hemmer (born 1963), West German-German slalom canoeist
- Hans Ritter von Hemmer, (1869–1931), officer in the Royal Bavarian Army, Knight Commander of the Military Order of Max Joseph
- Jane Hemmer (born 1947), American artist, farmer and politician from Gainesville, Georgia, U.S.
- Jarl Hemmer (1893–1944), Finland-Swedish author from Vaasa, Finland
- Ludwig Hemmer (?-1925), German printer and graphic artist
- Mari Hemmer (born 1983), Norwegian long-track speedskater
- Martin Hemmer, German slalom canoeist who competed in the early 1990s
- Nicole Hemmer, American historian
- Nina Hemmer (born 1993), German freestyle wrestler
- Per Christian Hemmer (1933-2022), Norwegian physicist
- Pierre Hemmer (1950–2013), Swiss engineer and entrepreneur
- Rafael Lozano-Hemmer (born 1967), Mexican-Canadian electronic artist

== Other uses ==
- Hemmer is also the name of a character in Star Trek: Strange New Worlds
