= Borde (disambiguation) =

Borde, Børde or Börde may refer to:

== Places ==
- Börde, region of highly fertile lowland in North Germany
- Börde (district), subdivision of Saxony-Anhalt

== Surname ==
- Andrew Borde (c. 1490–1549), English traveller and writer
- Arvind Borde, American cosmologist, co-author of the Borde–Guth–Vilenkin theorem
- Chandu Borde (b. 1934), Indian cricketer
- François Borde (1899–1987), French rugby union player
- Ketil Børde (1935–2022), Norwegian civil servant
- Percival Borde (1922–1979), Trinidadian dancer
- Ramesh Borde (1952–2021), Indian cricketer
