= Hemmert =

Hemmert is a surname. Notable people with the surname include:

- Dan Hemmert, American businessman and politician
- Terri Hemmert (born 1948), American radio personality, musicologist, and instructor

== See also ==
- Hemmer
