= Osv. =

2010 play by Johan Harstad

Paperback edition, 2011

Osv. (Norwegian abbreviation meaning 'And so on'. English title is Etc.) is a two-part play by Johan Harstad from 2010. It was published as a book on November 1, 2010, and was nominated for the Brage Prize the same year. With a length of just over 500 pages, it is among the longest plays ever published in Norway.

In 2014, Johan Harstad received the Norwegian Ibsen Award for Osv.

== Writing and publication ==
Work on Osv. was started shortly after Harstad was hired as the in-house playwright at the Nationaltheatret in Oslo, Norway. A staged reading of the play as a work-in-progress was held at the National Theatre on September 17 and 19 of 2009. The cast was as follows: Anders T. Andersen (Alan), Trond Brænne (Joseph Zimmer), Endre Hellestveit (Lefèvre/Roger), Ole Johan Skjelbred (Peter/Benjamin), Finn Schau (Bowman), Marte M. Solem (Lisa), Henrik Mestad (Salko), Ingjerd Egeberg (Nola), Anne Marie Ottersen (Kay/Priest) and Mattis Herman Nyquist (Pascal).

A full-scale production of the finished play is expected be performed at the National Theatre in 2013.

== Characters ==
The play is written for a minimum of ten actors, each of which plays two or more of the over thirty roles.

There are nine main characters:

- Joseph Zimmer, Vietnam veteran and accountant with Denburg & Low.
- Edward Bowman, Vietnam veteran, runs a souvenir shop in Washington, D.C.'s Constitution Gardens.
- Alan Zimmer, A freelance war photographer. Joseph's son.
- Salko, Bosnian Muslim, working at the Holiday Inn in Sarajevo.
- Nola Zimmer, Editor for the BBC. Joseph's daughter.
- Roger, Nola's husband.
- Kay Zimmer, Senior editor at a publishing house. Joseph's wife.
- Pascal, Teacher. Former member of the Interahamwe.
- Lefevre, French aid worker. Patriot. Anti-American.

== Plot ==
Most of the play takes place in 1994–1995 and focuses on a period in the 1990s marked by devastating armed conflicts, genocide and wars. The action alternates between parallel events in Washington, D.C., London, Sarajevo, Kigali, Grozny, etc. Towards the end of part two, the action moves to the years 2001 and 2004, briefly covering the September 11 attacks and the battle for Fallujah, Iraq, in 2004.

In the opening scene, which takes place in 1995, we meet Alan, Nola and Kay outside a church in London, where the funeral of their father and husband Joseph Zimmer is about to take place. The action then moves back to the previous year: Joseph Zimmer has left his wife and home and moved into a park in Washington, D.C., in order to force himself to confront what he experienced as a soldier in Vietnam. In London, Nola is about to lose her grip on reality after losing her husband and children in a terrible attack on the London Underground system. Her mother, Kay, arrives in London to take care of her, while his son Alan throughout the play works his way from Bosnia to Rwanda and finally to Chechnya as a war photographer. Their lives are all about to perish in various ways, and Kay's desire were to recreate the seemingly happy family they had been, is becoming increasingly unrealistic. In addition to the Zimmer family, the play also follows the development of several of the characters the family interacts with along the way.

== Themes ==
Etc. is a play about how hard it can be to stay alive in a world that seem to lack even the most basic compassion for human suffering, a world which constantly and repeatedly sees disastrous wars, despite the fact that man in many other areas, such as in science and technology, has made outstanding progress. The title is also possible to play on just this, that the wars will continue indefinitely, even though the leaders in every conflict seeks to give the impression that a victory would bring permanent peace to the area or the world as a whole.

Skating Sport plays a certain role in the play. Several of the characters discuss the career and private life of figure skater Tonya Harding, focusing on her problems during the Olympic Games in Lillehammer in 1994 and looking both at her story as a parallel to humanity itself and the country they are currently in. It is also possible to see this preoccupation with figure skating in terms of its essence, that both the traditional speed skating and figure skating ends up exactly where you started, despite all the energy that went on to complete the exercise. Which may have similarities with many wars.
