= Odd Selmer =

Norwegian writer (1930–2024)

- Born: 7 February 1930; Strinda Municipality, Norway
- Died: 2 March 2024 (aged 94)
- Occupations: Journalist, author
- Awards: Norwegian Ibsen Award (1988)

Odd Selmer (7 February 1930 – 2 March 2024) was a Norwegian journalist, novelist, crime fiction writer and playwright. Probably best known for his audio plays, he was awarded the Norwegian Ibsen Award in 1988.

== Early and personal life ==
Selmer was born in Strinda on 7 February 1930, to Jul Olaf Selmer and Dagmar Thekla Aarum. He grew up in Lillehammer, from the age of seven. In 1956 he married hotelier Reidun Lilleseth.

== Career ==
Selmer started his working career as journalist, working for the newspaper Morgenbladet from 1951 to 1953, and for Møre Dagblad from 1953 to 1954. He attended Journalistakademiet from 1955 to 1956. He worked one year for the Norwegian News Agency, and eventually for Adresseavisen from 1959 to 1971.

His book debut was the travelogue Gjennom Canada i prærievognens spor from 1958. Then he followed up with the crime novels Døden kommer bakfra from 1963, and Skriftemålet from 1965.

He is probably best known for his audio plays. These include Amerikaturen from 1971, Virkelighetens verden (1972), Reisende (1972), Vennskapets frukter (1972), and Misjonæren (1973). He wrote the play Spill in 1973, and the novel Gullburet in 1975. This contemporary novel is a critical depiction of a political and art society in Oslo. Further audio plays are Alpinisten (1975), Butikksjefen (1976), and En våken og fri presse (1976). He wrote the plays Dobbeltspill in 1979 and Det er min vår i høst in 1981, and the audio plays Som gul morild i blodet (1981), Paradisløpet (1984), and Otium (1985). Further the audio play series På egne ben from 1988, and the series Fru Mao from 1989, and the audio play Pappas dag from 1990.

In 1977 he wrote a historical novel about the eccentric "Lady" Barbara Arbuthnott, a Scottish Lady who settled in Sunndal Municipality in the 1870s. Later novels are Det året Mao døde (1984), and Og verden var som ny from 1992, set in Kristiania and Wien around 1900.

His audio plays have been translated into fifteen languages. He was awarded the Ibsen Prize in 1988 for the audio play series På egne ben.

Selmer died on 2 March 2024, at the age of 94.
