= Ambulanse =

Book by Johan Harstad

- First edition cover
- Author: Johan Harstad
- Original title: Ambulanse
- Language: Norwegian
- Genre: Short story collection
- Publisher: Gyldendal Norsk Forlag
- Publication date: 2002

Ambulance (Original title: Ambulanse) is a collection of short stories by the Norwegian author Johan Harstad, published in 2002. The collection contains eleven short stories, all connected to each other. The main character in one of the stories shows up as an 'extra' in the next, and several stories are told from different angles. The overall link between the short stories is an ambulance driving through an unnamed city.

Harstad received the Bjørnson Stipend for the collection. It has also been published in France and Finland, and many of the short stories have been published in anthologies in Germany, France, England, United States, Italy and India.
