= Darlah =

2008 novel by Johan Harstad

DARLAH
- Cover of the 2008 Norwegian release
- Author: Johan Harstad
- Language: Norwegian
- Genre: horror, science fiction
- Publisher: Cappelen Damm, Little, Brown
- Publication date: September 15, 2008 (Norway), July 10, 2012 (USA)
- Publication place: Norway
- Media type: Print (hardcover and electronic book) and audio-CD
- Pages: 370
- ISBN: 0375866566
- LC Class: PZ7.H26736Se 2012

DARLAH (English title: 172 Hours on the Moon) is a 2008 young adult science fiction/horror novel by Norwegian author Johan Harstad. The book was originally published in Norway on September 15, 2008 by Cappelen Damm, with an English language translation being published by Little, Brown in New York City on July 10, 2012. Rights to DARLAH have also been sold to sixteen other countries: Denmark, Sweden, Finland, Iceland, Faroe Islands, France, the Netherlands, Germany, UK, Turkey, Bangladesh, Vietnam, Taiwan, South Korea, Mexico and Brazil. In 2008 Harstad's work on DARLAH won him a Brage Prize.

== Plot ==
After a prologue set in 2010, the book begins in 2012, after NASA has announced its intent to hold a contest for teenagers between the ages of 14 and 18. Three winners will be selected from all over the world, with the prize being a coveted spot on an upcoming mission to return to the Moon. The stunt is believed to be a way of increasing both funding and public interest, but the real reason is that NASA intends to study a mystical phenomenon with a sinister edge that was previously discovered during the original Moon landings. This is the reason that NASA stopped sending people to the Moon in the 1970s.

Three teenagers from Norway, Japan, and France (Mia, Midori, and Antoine respectively) are excited at the rare opportunity to see the Moon firsthand as well as stay in the formerly secret lunar base DARLAH 2, which was built in the 1970s during Operation DP7. Their excitement is short-lived as they realize that this base might become their tomb, discovering what keeps other from visiting the Moon: beings that can only be described as doppelgängers, which are revealed to have appeared in Earth's history before. Before the Moon landings, they were harmless, but after a radio telescope receives what has been called the "6EQUJ5" signal, humans decide to investigate. The code "6EQUJ5" has been following the three teenagers everywhere since shortly after they are selected to travel to the Moon, with Mia seeing "6E" written on a hobo's jacket, Antoine seeing "QU" on a crashing plane, which never existed, and Midori seeing "J5" as the airport gate leading to where she is to depart for the United States. Ever since the first Moon landing, the doppelgangers have attacked any and all astronauts, nearly killing the crew of Apollo 13, and after analyzing a detached doppelgänger arm, NASA finds that the beings are not living, as they are composed of an unknown inorganic material.

Meanwhile, a retired NASA custodian from the era of the first Moon landings, living in a retirement home, slowly remembers the horrible secret that will mean the teenagers' imminent death if they are allowed to travel to the Moon. Back on Earth, after the doppelgängers attack the Moon base, the children and their "chaperones" are declared dead, leaving no hope for them. One by one, each are killed by their doppelgängers: the two engineers on the mission are locked in an airless room to suffocate; Antoine and Mia's short-lived romance is extinguished by his disappearance with the mission commander; the lunar module pilot, a young woman, is murdered by Antoine's doppelgänger, leaving Mia and Midori to fend for themselves.

The retired NASA worker tries to alert the military, but because of an inability to speak, fails, and dies shortly afterwards.

Mia and Midori run to the kitchen of DARLAH 2 to hide from the doppelgängers, which have infiltrated the base, first posing as Mia. They hide in the kitchen and then run to the greenhouse, finding the moonbase commander camped out under a tree. He tells them to run to the escape pod in the underground moonbase DARLAH 1, which can only carry three people. Mia tries to persuade him to join them, since there is room, but he believes he should die on the base, saying he has a gun and can defend himself. Mia and Midori find spacesuits and go outside, having to traverse some of the moonscape to get to the pod. Along the way, they find the bodies of Antoine and the astronaut he disappeared with. Mia pauses to mourn Antoine, and moves on. Once inside the room leading to the pod, Midori suddenly acts childish and tries to thwart Mia's attempts to make it to the pod. Mia realizes Midori is dead and has been replaced with a doppelgänger, having been killed when they were hiding in the kitchen. The Midori doppelgänger muses about how "silly" Midori was, believing in urban legends, including the legend of Kuchisake-onna. Imitating the legend, the Midori doppelgänger splits her mouth, leaving two scars, and asks "Watashi kirei?" ("Am I beautiful now?") Mia makes a desperate escape to the pod, the doppelgänger changing its shape to match Mia's. The two Mias fight, and Mia gets into the escape pod, with the other Mia desperately beating on the sides, trying to get access, but failing and shrieking as the pod takes off.

The pod crash-lands on Earth several days later, and Mia's parents rent her the most expensive hotel room in New York. She runs into the hobo from the beginning of the book and kills him, revealing that the Mia on Earth is a doppelgänger, and can make a copy of itself with every person it kills. Mia's family comes to visit her, and her little brother is frightened by her, saying her eyes are scary. She kills Mia's family, making many copies of herself, and proceeds to kill everyone in the hotel.

A mission report appears at the end of the book from the spacecraft Providence, returning to the Moon on the way to Europa in 2081, finding the bodies of Mia, the lunar module pilot, the engineers and the moonbase commander. The commander shot himself, and the rest were either suffocated (the two engineers and Mia) or had an unknown cause of death (the lunar module pilot). The Providence has not encountered the doppelgängers, and says they have found the cause of the "DP7 event on Earth in 2019" (Mia killing everybody) and have found a letter written by Mia. She says goodbye in this letter, saying she has very little time left and that the space suit's gloves make it hard to write. The report ends.

== US marketing campaign ==
Prior to the US release of 172 Hours on the Moon in July 2012, Little, Brown, the publishing house, created an extensive media campaign to promote the book. A website was made, where visitors were met by the text "Do you want to go to the moon? Are you between the ages of 14 and 18? Spend 172 Hours on the moon at moon base Darlah 2", trying to get them to believe that the upcoming mission to the Moon was in fact real. Visitors were asked to submit their e-mail in order to compete for a ticket allowing them to come along on the expedition into space. In addition, a Facebook-profile was created, as well as a Twitter account where Mia, Midori and Antoine, the three teenage protagonists in the novel updated followers in real-time about the last preparations leading up to the announced liftoff, which was in fact just the date and time for the release of the book.

During the media campaign Little, Brown also put up a number of video clips on YouTube, further enhancing the experience of a real upcoming mission by allowing the viewers (and potential readers of the novel) to meet the three main characters through found footage-style snippets of private video logs, press conferences, home video and footage apparently shot on the Moon itself.

Harstad also attended the 2012 San Diego Comic-Con, taking part in panel discussions with other sci-fi/horror novelists, such as Mark Z. Danielewski, as well as doing signings. At the Hachette Book Groups booth on the main expo floor, Little, Brown gave away packs of custom designed Space ice cream, with the sentence "This could be your last meal" on the front, along with a picture of the Moon on a pitch black background and the title of the book.

== Reception ==
Reception for the various translations of DARLAH has been positive, with The Guardian calling it "out of this world". The Hollywood Reporter also gave a positive review, citing the mixture of horror and sci-fi as a highlight of the novel. Kirkus Reviews and Publishers Weekly praised the book, with Publishers Weekly stating that although "readers don’t get to know the characters terribly well" that this added to the book's atmosphere. The book received the 2008 Brage Prize for children's literature.
