= Finn Iunker =

Norwegian playwright (born 1969)

Finn Iunker (born 27 March 1969) is a Norwegian playwright born in Arendal Municipality. He lives in Oslo. Finn Iunker made his debut as a dramatist in 1994 with The Answering Machine. He is amongst the Norwegian dramatists whose plays are most frequently staged, but mostly abroad. He was awarded the Ibsen-award in company with Liv Heløe in 2006, and was up for nomination in 2003’s Nordisk Dramatikerpris. He has just published a collection of short prose; Fortellinger, to rave reviews. He has also written Ifigeneia and Dealing with Helen.

== About Ifigeneia ==
Iunker’s Ifigeneia has sprung from Euripede’s tragedy Iphigeneia in Aulis based on the myth of Agamemnon, leader of the Greek forces in Troy who makes the agonising choice of sacrificing his daughter to win favourable winds for his ships sailing against Troy. Parallels are drawn between the cynicism of leaders then and now, lines made more visible by Iunker’s highly modern language with an underlying streak of farce.

== Play ==
His play Ifigeneia premiered in Antwerp where it was produced by the Flemish Theatre company Skagen. Three years later, on 26 October 2006 his play was staged for the first time in his own home country, Norway, where it was produced in Oslo at the Black Box Theatre by the Norwegian theatre company Verk Produksjoner.

== Awards ==
- 2006 - Ibsen Prize
