= Barbara Arbuthnott =

Scottish writer (1822–1904)

- Born: Barbara Elrington Douglas; 22 September 1822; Templemore, Ireland
- Died: 28 August 1904 (aged 81)
- Spouses: James Allen; Neil Ferguson; William Arbuthnott

Barbara Elrington Douglas Arbuthnott (12 September 1822 – 28 August 1904) was a Scottish woman who lived in Sunndal Municipality, Norway where she engaged in charitable work and wrote about her life.

== Biography ==
Douglas was born into a wealthy Scottish family in Templemore, Ireland. Her father, Sir Neil Douglas, KCB, KCH (dies 1853) was a Scottish officer and Lieutenant General in the British army. Her mother was the daughter of a wealthy banker in Edinburgh. In her youth, she studied the Greek, Latin and German languages in Brussels (1831–1840). She met Queen Victoria in 1842. On her father's travels in the East she learned to speak Hindi.

She first married James Allen (1846–1849) who died of cholera, then Neil Ferguson, who died in the Crimean War. In London she had met the famous Norwegian violinist and theatre founder Ole Bull. She came to Sunndal, in Møre og Romsdal county, Norway on her honeymoon with her third husband (married 6 December 1865), Hon William Arbuthnott, son of 8th Viscount of Arbuthnott. They were divorced, after her 20-year-old son from her first marriage died, allegedly because she thought her husband had provoked an epileptic seizure by quarrelling with her son, who then died at Fokstua coach inn on 15 September 1868.

She was renowned, among other things, for driving her sick son with a horse and wagon across the Dovrefjell mountain range, while trying to save his life. After her son's death she bought the farm Løken, which is now a local museum.

She then cleared the land for a new farm, Elverhøy. She taught herself to speak Norwegian, cohabited with the translator, Oluf Endresen from Sunndal, and was said to be very generous, giving magnificent parties for the bourgeoisie. She took an interest in the local health service and the local rifle club, founded a local library and was an agricultural pioneer. She brought poultry and swine from Great Britain to the valley. And she wrote books about chicken farming, The Henwife (1861) and The Henwife – Her own experience in her own Poultry-Yard (1870).

She had built Alfheim, the mountain farm high up above the valley of Grødalen, in 1876. Her English bank went bankrupt in 1886. She sold some of its properties, but bankruptcy and forced sales was inevitable. She lived with the local teacher Lars Hoaas. Her board and lodging were paid for by benevolent neighbours. From 1892 to her death she lived in poverty at Einabu near the village of Grøa.

== Legacy ==
- Leikvin Cultural Heritage Park (Leikvin Bygdemuseum) has a collection from Barbara Arbuthnott's estate.
- The musical Lady Arbuthnott – The mistress of Elverhøy (Lady Arbuthnott -Frua på Elverhøy), by Norwegian playwright, Stig Nilsson with music by Lars Ramsøy-Halle, has been performed annually since the Sunndal Cultural Festival (Sunndal Kulturfestival) of 1996.
- The documentary film, Lady Arbuthnott – The Queen of Sunndal was shown during 1999 on the Norwegian Broadcasting Corporation.

== Other sources ==
- Hauge, Eiliv Odde (1957) Lady Arbuthnott og hennes menn (Gyldendal) ISBN 82-91132-06-2
- Selmer, Odd (1977) Barbara Arbuthnott (Gyldendal norsk Forlag) ISBN 978-82-05-10524-9
