= Norwegian Ibsen Award =

The Norwegian Ibsen Award (Norwegian: Ibsenprisen) is awarded to promote Norwegian drama and is awarded only to playwrights, named after playwright Henrik Ibsen.

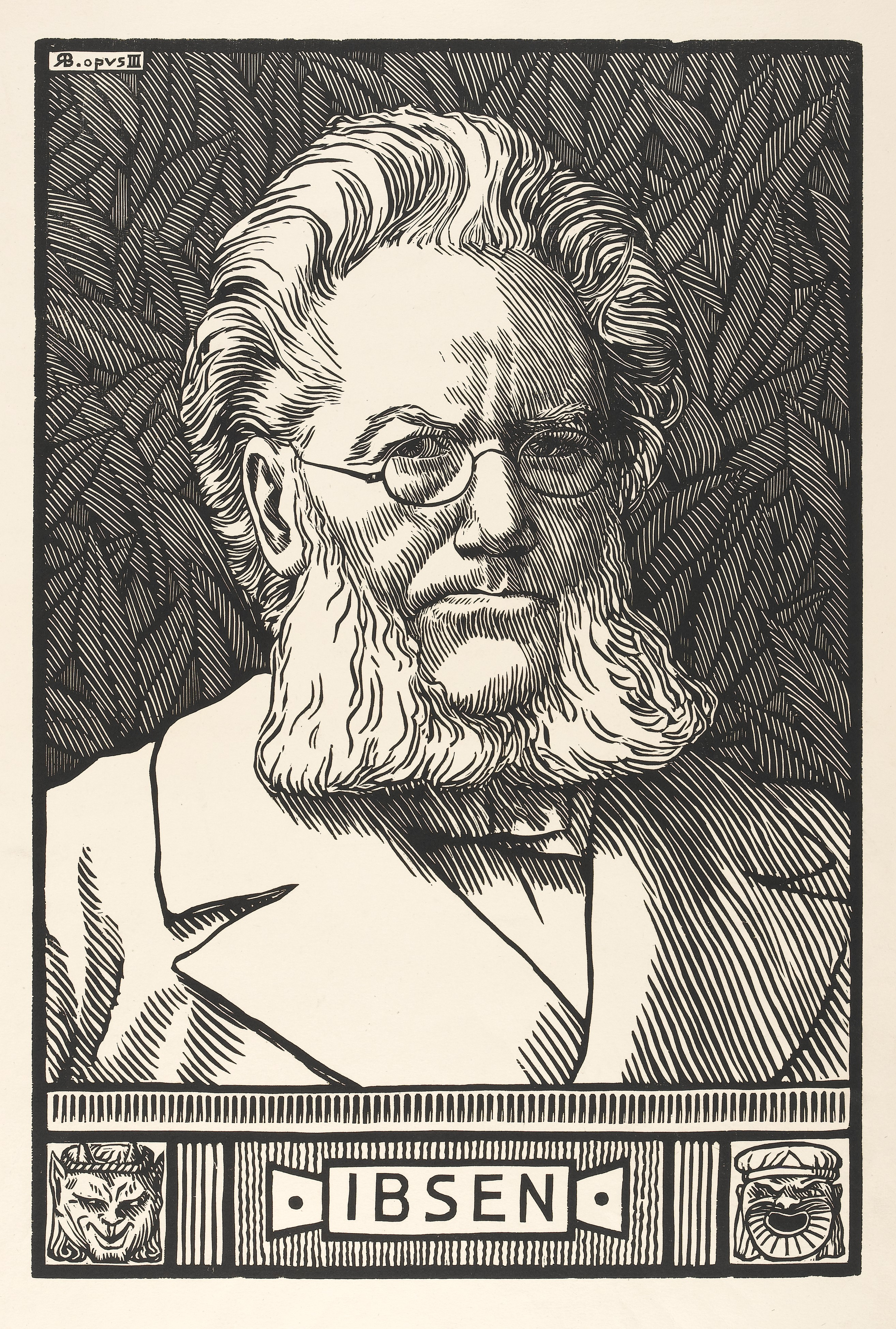
Henrik Ibsen (1828–1906)

== History ==
The prize is awarded by Skien municipality, the hometown of author and playwright Henrik Ibsen, and has been awarded every year since 1986. The prize is awarded to a Norwegian playwright who has published a new work in the past year which has been produced by a professional theater, radio theater, or on television. It may also be awarded for the cumulative work in authoring dramatic works.

Formerly, the prize was awarded annually in Skien on March 20, in commemoration of the birthday of Henrik Ibsen. Since 2008 it has been awarded in September at the International Ibsen Conference held in Skien, together with the International Ibsen Award (Den internasjonale Ibsenprisen) established in 2008 and first awarded to British theatre and film director Peter Brook.

Since 2005 the prize has consisted of a monetary award of 150,000 kroner and a statuette of Ibsen designed by Nina Sundbye.

The jury consists of six members, one from each of these organizations:

- Norwegian Critics' Association (Norsk litteraturkritikerlag)
- Norwegian Drama Forum (Norsk Dramaturgforum)
- Norwegian Stage Instructor Association (Norsk Sceneinstruktørforening)
- Norwegian Theater Directors' Association (Norsk Teaterleder–Forening)
- Oslo National Academy of the Arts/University of Oslo (Kunsthøgskolen i Oslo/Universitetet i Oslo)
- Skien municipality with Theatre Ibsen (Skien kommune ved Teater Ibsen)

The responsibility for public relations is handled by the firm Kulturmeglerne.

== Prizewinners ==
- 1986 – Arne Skouen for overall dramatic contributions
- 1987 – Peder Cappelen for Eufemianatten
- 1988 – Odd Selmer for På egne ben
- 1989 – Julian Garner for Svarte okser
- 1990 – Edvard Rønning for Himmelplaneten
- 1991 – Marit Tusvik for Mugg
- 1992 – Bjørg Vik for Møte i Venezia
- 1993 – Norvald Tveit for overall dramatic contributions
- 1994 – Eva Sevaldson for Framtida er avlyst
- 1995 – Terje Nordby for Isblomst
- 1996 – Jon Fosse for Namnet
- 1997 – Jesper Halle for Dagenes lys
- 1998 – Petter S. Rosenlund for En umulig gutt
- 1999 – Cecilie Løveid for Østerrike and for overall dramatic contributions
- 2000 – Tor Åge Bringsværd for overall dramatic contributions
- 2001 – Nina Valsø for Ubuden gjest
- 2002 – Niels Fredrik Dahl for Som torden
- 2003 – Wetle Holtan for De som lever
- 2004 – Per HV Schreiner for Den brysomme mannen
- 2005 – Maria Tryti Vennerød for Dama i luka
- 2006 – Liv Heløe og Finn Iunker
- 2007 – Christopher Grøndahl for Tundra and for Silent Winds of Blackpool
- 2008 – Edvard Hoem for Mikal Hetles siste ord
- 2009 – Christopher Nielsen for Verdiløse menn
- 2010 – Kate Pendry for Erasmus Tyrannus Rex
- 2011 – Lennart Lidström for Pingviner i Sahara
- 2012 - Fredrik Brattberg for Tilbakekomstene
- 2014 - Johan Harstad for Osv.
- 2015 - Cecilie Løveid for Visning
- 2016 - Mette Edvardsen for We to be
- 2017 – Tore Vagn Lid, Cecilie Løveid and Nordahl Grieg for Vår ære/vår makt
- 2018 – Malmfrid Hovsveen Hallum for Solveigs 2. sang
- 2019 – Demian Vitanza for Tyngde
- 2020 – Lisa Charlotte Baudouin Lie for sceneteksten Mare

== See also ==
- International Ibsen Award
