= From Here on In You Just Get Older =

1st edition, 2001

From Here on In You Just Get Older (Original title: Herfra blir du bare eldre) is a collection of short prose by the Norwegian author Johan Harstad. Published in 2001, the texts circle around people waiting to be saved. Harstad writes about people who have lost the ability to communicate, resignation and trial and error en route to finding a way to live one's life. It is a book about people that know that the polar ice is melting, a book about those who never dare admit that they need to be saved, those who know that one day they will be forgotten, those about to disappear both from themselves and the world around them.
