= Johan Harstad =

Norwegian author

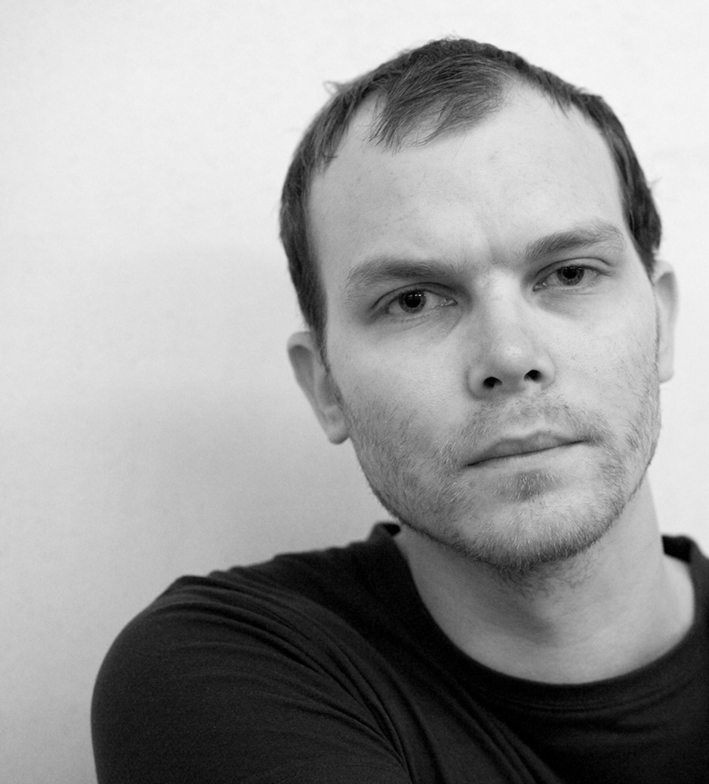
- Johan Harstad, 2009
- Born: 10 February 1979 (age 47); Stavanger, Norway
- Writing career
- Genres: Novels, short stories, plays, non-fiction

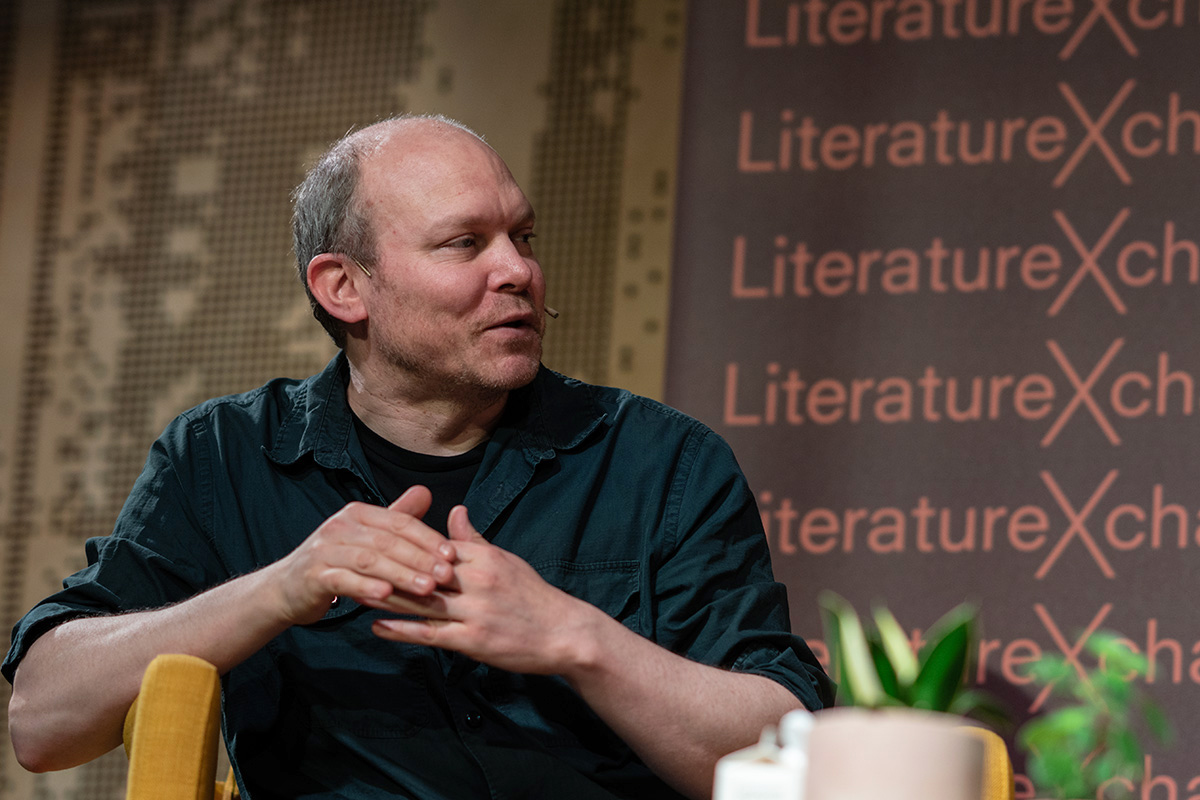
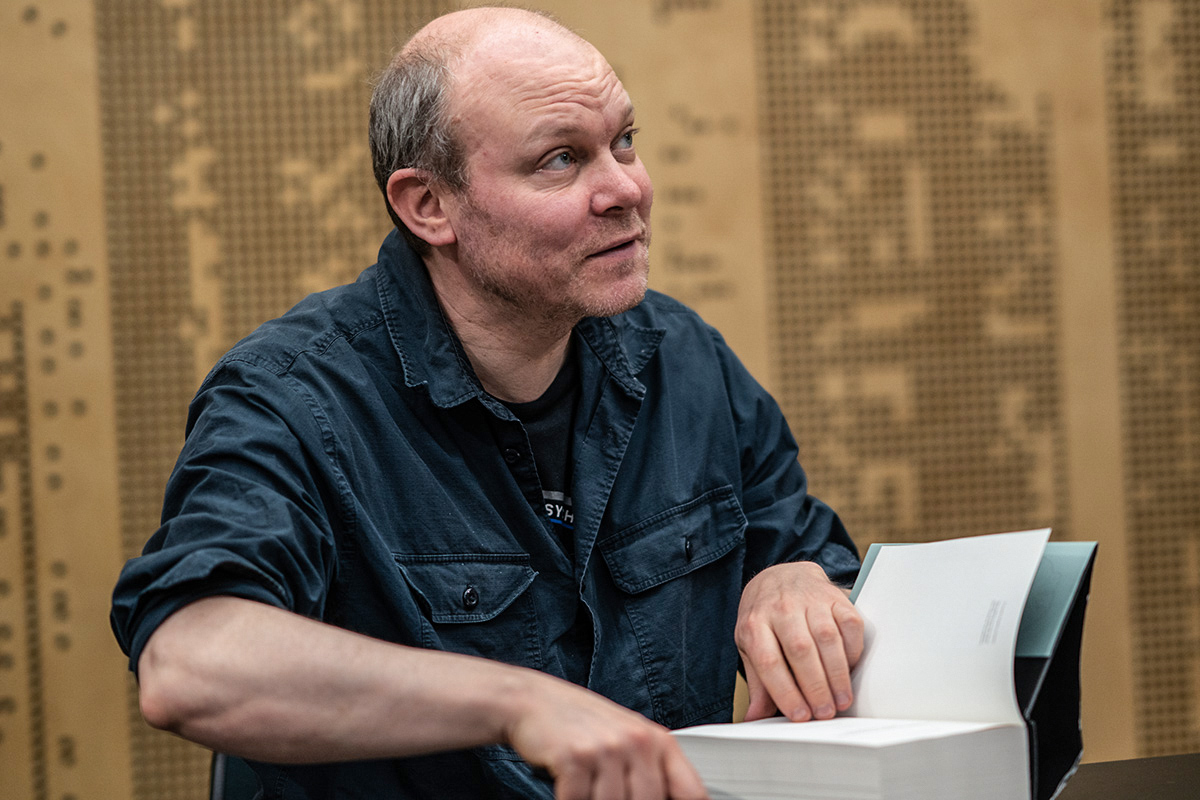
LiteratureXcange Festival in Aarhus
(Denmark 2026)

Johan Harstad (born 10 February 1979) is a Norwegian novelist, short story writer, playwright and graphic designer. He lives in Oslo.

== Writing career ==
=== Fiction ===
Harstad was born in Stavanger. He made his literary debut in 2001, with a collection of short prose entitled Herfra blir du bare eldre ('From here on in you only get older'). The following year he published a collection of short stories called Ambulanse ('Ambulance') and 2005 saw the publication of his first novel, Buzz Aldrin, hvor ble det av deg i alt mylderet? ('Buzz Aldrin, What Happened to You in All the Confusion?'). The novel is mainly set in the Faroe Islands in the North Atlantic Ocean. It deals with a person who, instead of trying to be best, decides to be second best in life, like his hero, Buzz Aldrin, the second man on the Moon. In 2009 the novel was made into a television series, starring Chad Coleman as well as other, well known Scandinavian actors, including Pål Sverre Valheim Hagen and Bjarne Henriksen. Rights to the book have been sold to United States, Australia, Sweden, Denmark, Finland, the Netherlands, Germany, the Faroe Islands, Italy, Russia, Turkey, South Korea and France. Demanding that the book be translated into English, an editor in the publishing house Simon & Schuster likened Harstad's work with that of Jonathan Safran Foer. The book was published in English by Seven Stories Press in New York in June 2011, and was named a Kirkus Reviews Best Fiction Title of 2011 and one of Electric Literature's Most Beautiful Books of the Year.

In 2007, Harstad published Hässelby, a novel about the children's book character Alfie Atkins' life as an adult, who ultimately is held responsible for the end of the world. The novel is influenced by David Lynch's TV series Twin Peaks, the theory of Synchronicity and Arthur Koestler's book The Roots of Coincidence.

In 2008 he published his first sci-fi / horror novel, 172 Hours on the Moon, a crossover between young adult fiction and adult fiction. The novel, dealing with a return to the Moon in 2012 (2019 in the US edition), is partly a homage to sci-fi and horror films from the 1970s and 1980s. For DARLAH he was awarded the 2008 Brage Prize in the category children's literature. The rights to the novel has been sold to United States, Sweden, Denmark, Finland, the Netherlands, Germany, the Faroe Islands, Turkey, South Korea, France, Mexico, Taiwan, Brazil and Serbia.

In 2015 he published Max-Mischa-Tetoffensiven, a more than a 1000 pages long novel centered around the life of the playwright and theatre director Max Hansen who moved from his native Norway to the U.S. as a teenager. The Dutch translation of this work was awarded the 2018 Europese Literatuur Prijs, a prize for translated European literature.

Harstad was awarded the Dobloug Prize in 2019.

=== Plays ===
Harstad is also a playwright, and four of his works was published in 2008 as Bsider ('B-sides'). In late 2008 Harstad was hired as an in-house playwright at the National Theatre of Norway, as the first to hold such a position. During his time at the National Theatre he started working on an extensive two part play which was published in 2010 as Osv. ('Etc.'). The play, which in its Norwegian edition is over 500 pages long, is set in 1994 and centers around an American family whose relationship is falling apart. The father, a Vietnam War veteran, suffers a nervous breakdown more than two decades after his homecoming and moves into the park at Constitution Gardens in Washington D.C., next to the Vietnam Veterans Memorial wall. The daughter struggles in London, after the loss of her husband and the son is a war photographer, covering conflicts in Europe and Africa. The Bosnian War, the first Chechen war and the Rwandan genocide plays a big part in the play, both as a setting and as examples of growing conflicts in the mid-1990s. For this play, Harstad received, in 2014, the Norwegian Ibsen Award. Also, he was nominated for another Brage Prize Award.

In 2011 Harstad oversaw the first production of the complete Memoirs of a Breadman-trilogy at Black Box Teater in Oslo, a theater known for its focus on modern and contemporary theater. The plays are all a mix between comedy, tragedy and absurdism. The first part, Akapulco, takes place in a fictitious Swiss village in Mexico around 1920–1930. The second part, Ellis Iland is set in Manhattan between 1906 and 1917 and focus on two immigrants, a German man called Barker and a Ukrainian man called Stoklitsky, who struggles to make a life for themselves in the city. Barker is an accountant, but is forced by their landlady to work in the New York City sewer hunting alligators while Stoklitsky, who just happens to be tone deaf, tries to compose a symphony for theremins, containing only perfect fifths. The trilogy was one of three candidates for the 2012 Norwegian Ibsen Award.

Though no official explanation has been given by the author, many of the geographical names in Harstad's plays are intentionally misspelled (e.g. Washingtin, Akapulco, Ellis Iland, Mattrhorn). In the Memoirs of a Breadman, references are also made to places such as Ithalia, Mexicoo, U.E.S.A, Zyrich, Miilano, Providense and Chikago.

=== Non-fiction ===
In 2012 Harstad published his first non-fiction work, Blissard - A Book About Motorpsycho. The book is a mix between a biography of the Norwegian band Motorpsycho and their 1996 album Blissard, a personal account of the author's long-time relationship with the band's music and his own teenage years. More than 140 pages of the books total of 330 is made up by footnotes, where Harstad expands on band trivia, details, digressions, literary detours and personal stories as well as including interviews with people affiliated with the band, poetry, reviews and newspaper clippings.

== Bibliography ==
=== Books ===
- Herfra blir du bare eldre. Oslo: Gyldendal. 2001. ISBN 8205297894.
- Ambulanse. Oslo: Gyldendal. 2002. ISBN 8205307369.
- Buzz Aldrin, hvor ble det av deg i alt mylderet?. Oslo: Gyldendal. 2005. ISBN 8205339597.
- Hässelby. Oslo: Gyldendal. 2007. ISBN 9788205375772.
- Darlah – 172 timer på månen [172 Hours on the Moon]. 2008.
- Bsider. Oslo: Gyldendal. 2008. ISBN 9788205386013.
- Osv. Oslo: Gyldendal. 2010. ISBN 9788205406131.
- Max, Mischa & Tetoffensiven. Oslo: Gyldendal. 2015. ISBN 9788205473140.
- Ferskenen [The Red Handler]. 2018.

==== In translation ====
- 172 Hours on the Moon. Translated by Tara Chance. Little, Brown. 2013.
- The Red Handler. Translated by David Smith. Open Letter. 2024.
- Buzz Aldrin, What Happened to You in All the Confusion?: A Novel. Translated by Deborah Dawkin. Seven Stories Press. 2012.

=== Plays ===
- Grader av hvitt, 2007
- Washington, 2007
- Krasnoyarsk, 2008
- Brødmannens memoarer del 1: Akapulco, 2007
- Brødmannens memoarer del 2: Ellis Iland, 2009
- Osv., 2010
