= Torhild Bransdal =

Norwegian politician (1956–2022)

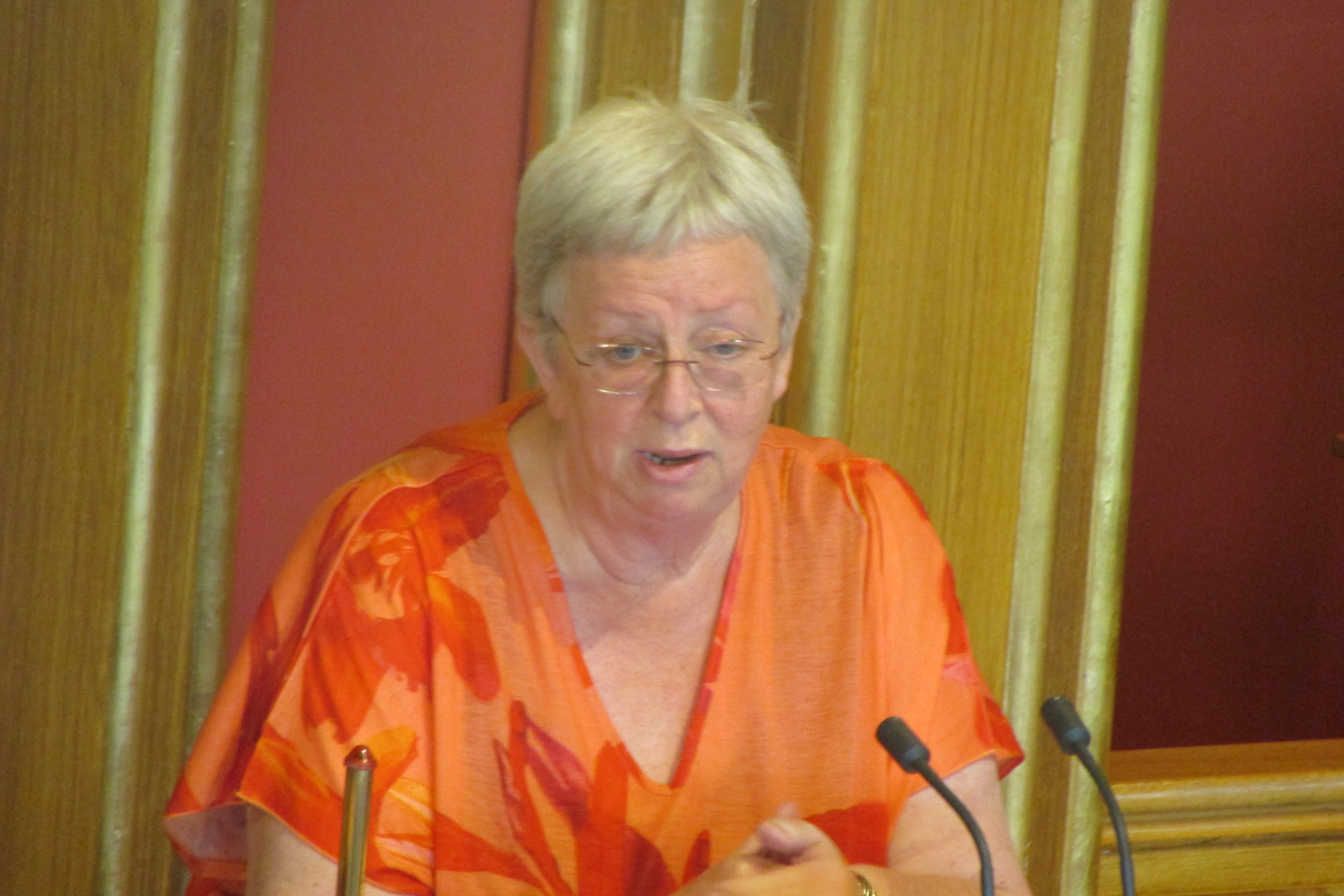
- Torhild Bransdal

Member of the Norwegian Parliament
- In office 1 October 2017 – 30 September 2021
- Constituency: Vest Agder

Mayor of Vennesla Municipality
- In office 1 October 1999 – 29 September 2017
- Preceded by: John Edvard Olsen
- Succeeded by: Nils Olav Larsen

Personal details
- Born: Magny Torhild Roland Bransdal; 10 April 1956
- Died: 28 September 2022 (aged 66)
- Party: Christian Democratic Party
- Occupation: Politician

Torhild Bransdal (10 April 1956 – 28 September 2022) was a Norwegian politician. She served as mayor of Vennesla Municipality from 1999 to 2017, and was the female mayor in Norway who had been in office for the longest time. She was elected representative to the Storting for the period 2017–2021 for the Christian Democratic Party.

== Political career ==
=== Local politics ===
Bransdal was a member of the municipal council of Vennesla Municipality from 1991 to 2019. She was also the mayor of Vennesla Municipality from 1999 to 2017. She thus became the female mayor in Norway who had been in office for the longest time.

=== Parliament ===
Bransdal was elected deputy representative to the Storting for the periods 2009–2013 and 2013–2017 from the constituency of Vest-Agder. She was elected ordinary representative to the Storting for the period 2017–2021, representing the Christian Democratic Party.

In the Storting, she was a member of the Standing Committee on Local Government and Public Administration from 2017 to 2021, and also a delegate to the Nordic Council during the same period.

== Death ==
Torhild Bransdal died at the Hospital of Southern Norway on 28 September 2022, after suffering from cancer for an extended period.
