= Oddleif Olavsen =

Norwegian politician (1945–2022)

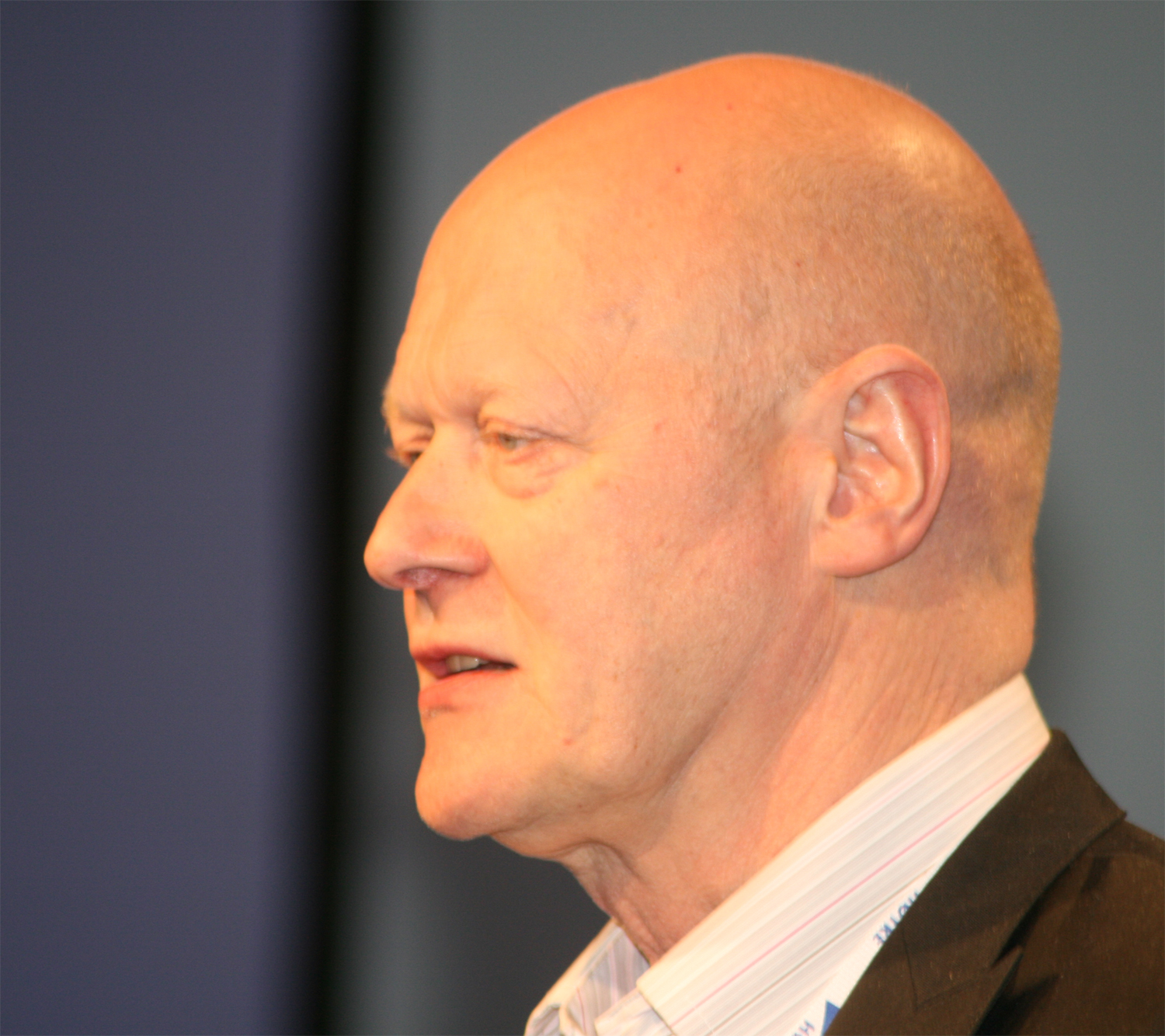
- Olavsen in 2009

Mayor of Bodø Municipality
- In office 1995–1999
- Preceded by: Per Pettersen
- Succeeded by: Odd Tore Fygle

Member of the Nordland County Council
- In office 2003–2007

Personal details
- Born: 9 October 1945 Lofoten, Norway
- Died: 5 June 2022 (aged 76) Norway
- Party: H
- Education: Bodø lærerhøgskole

Oddleif Olavsen (9 October 1945 – 5 June 2022) was a Norwegian politician.

== Biography ==
A member of the Conservative Party, he served as mayor of Bodø Municipality from 1995 to 1999. He then served on the Nordland County Council from 2003 to 2007.

Olavsen also played football for FK Bodø/Glimt as a goalkeeper in the late 1960s and early 1970s.

Oddleif Olavsen died on 5 June 2022 at the age of 76.
