= Aage Müller-Nilssen =

Norwegian priest and organizational leader (1940–2022)

- Born: 29 February 1940; Oslo, Norway
- Died: 1 May 2022 (aged 82)
- Education: Theology
- Occupations: Priest and organizational leader
- Organization: Church City Mission
- Awards: Order of St. Olav (2005)

Aage Müller-Nilssen (29 February 1940 – 1 May 2022) was a Norwegian theologian and organizational leader.

== Personal life ==
Müller-Nilssen was born in Oslo on 29 February 1940 and grew up in Bærum, a son of parish priest Alfred Müller Nilssen and Ellen Olsen. He was married to nurse Anne Marit Kristoffersen from 1963 until her death in 2002.

== Career ==
Having worked as priest in Oslo from 1968, he served as secretary-general for the Church City Mission from 1974 to 1999, and subsequently worked as priest for the organization.

He was decorated Knight, First Class of the Order of St. Olav in 2005.

Müller-Nilssen died on 1 May 2022, at the age of 82.
