= Nils Henrik Måsø =

Saami politician, journalist and editor from Norway

- Born: 23 September 1952
- Died: 9 January 2022 (aged 69)
- Occupation: Journalist
- Political party: Centre Party

Nils Henrik Måsø (23 September 1952 – 9 January 2022) was a Saami politician, journalist and editor from Norway.

Måsø was a journalist for the Sami newspaper Ságat, starting as freelance journalist from 1979, a part time assignment from 1983, and appointed district leader for Ságat in Tana from 1989. From 2001 he was chief editor of the Sami newspaper Min Áigi. He was a politician for the Centre Party, a leader of the Finnmark chapter of the party. He served as deputy mayor of Tana Municipality, and was elected member of the Sámi Parliament of Norway and of the Finnmark county council. Måsø died on 9 January 2022.
