= Ludwig Hemmer =

German photographer and publisher

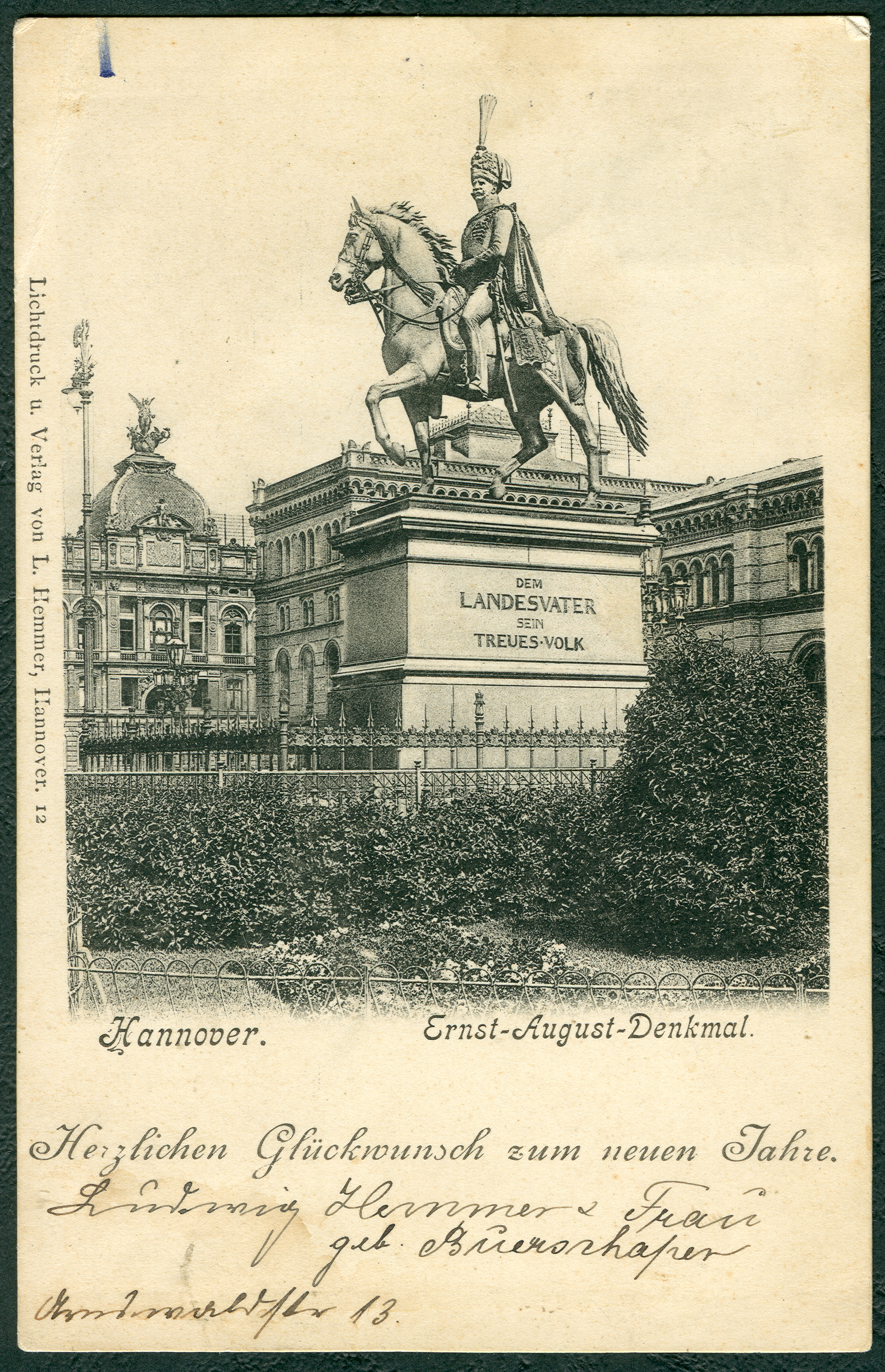
Picture postcard with consecutive number 12 (Ernst-August monument) and a "Congratulations on the new year" by Ludwig Hemmer + Frau, née Buerschaper, from the Arnswaldstraße 13

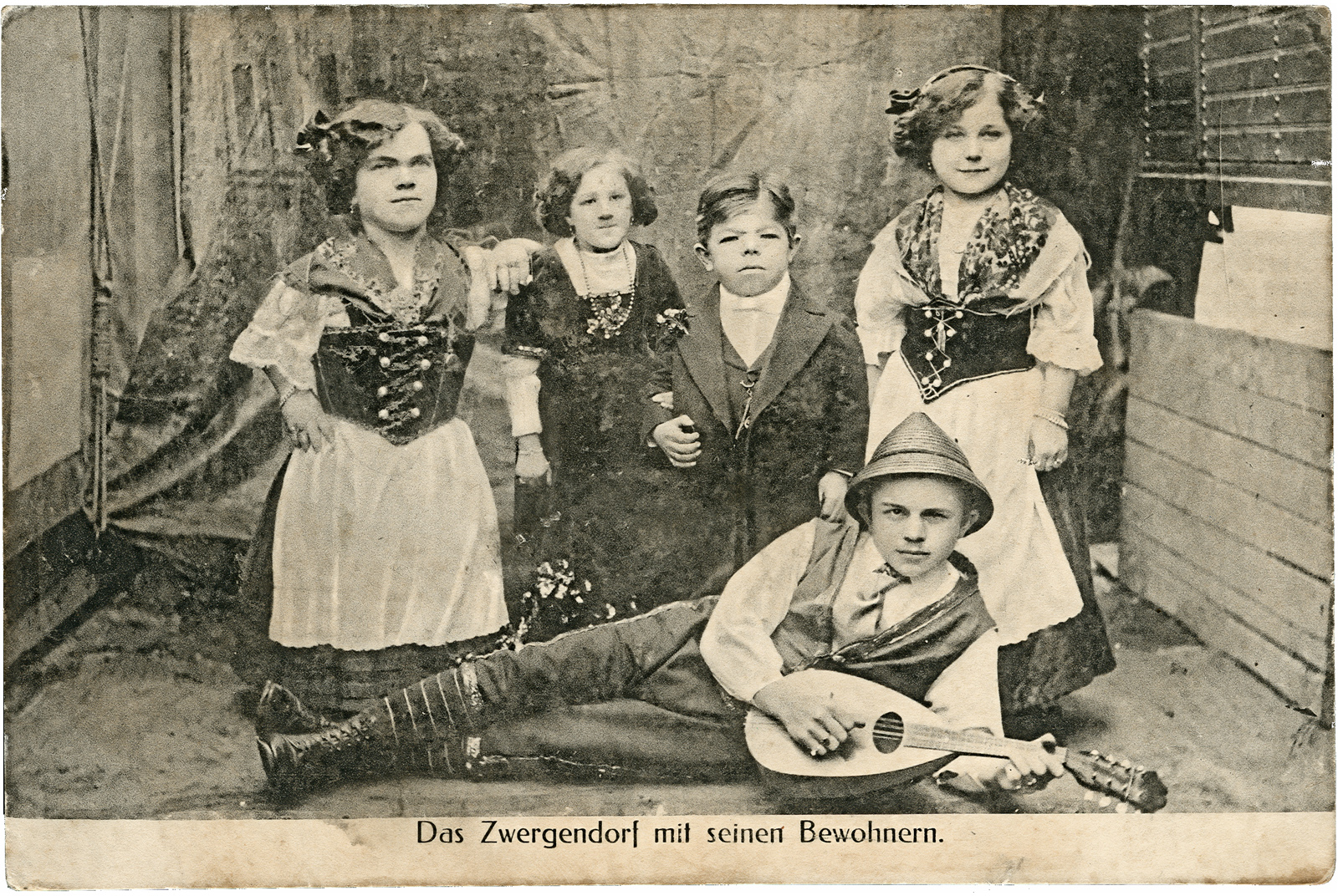
Picture postcard without numbering, titled "The dwarf village and its inhabitants".

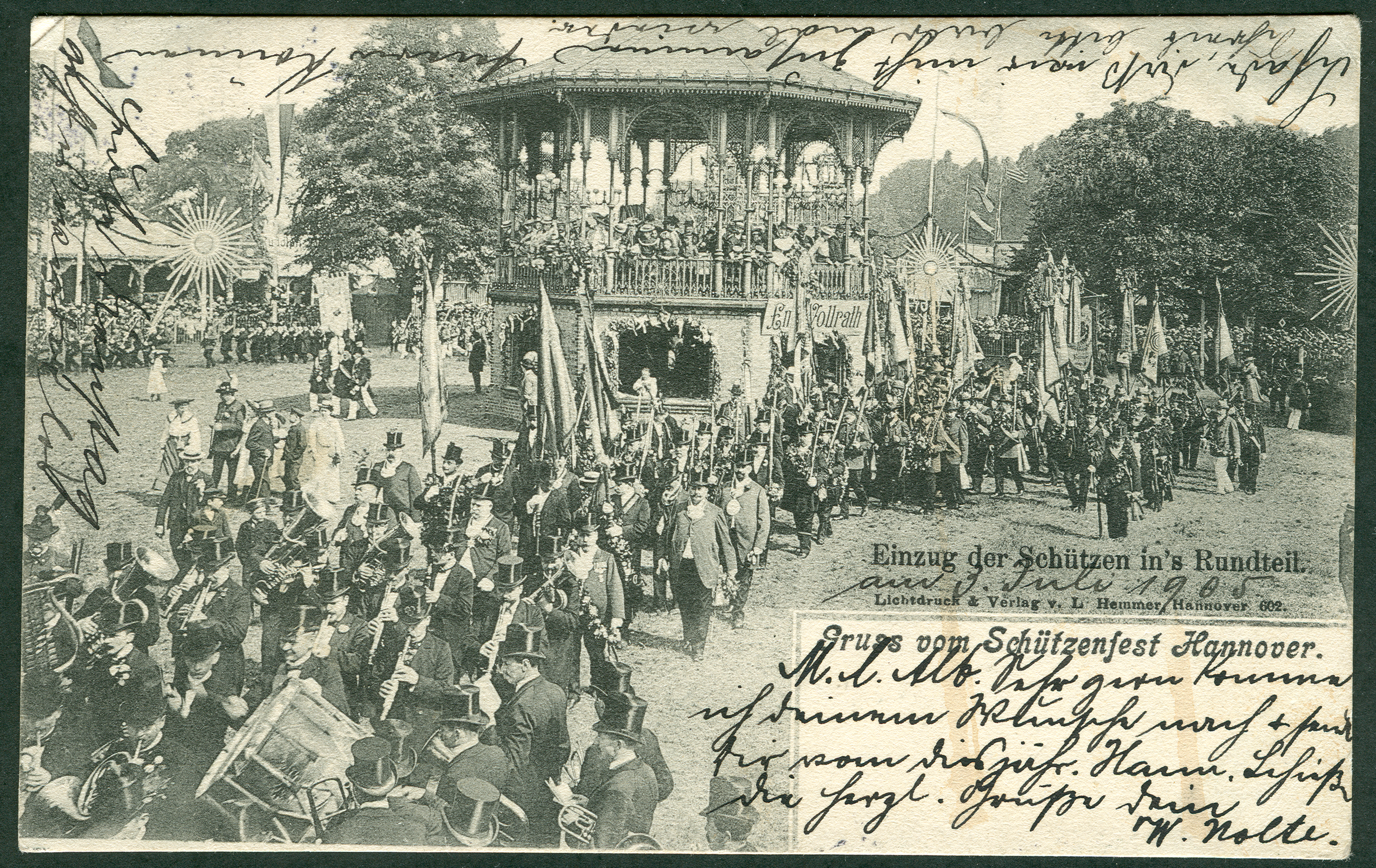
Entry of the Schützenverein into the "Rundteil" on the old Schützenplatz. Picture postcard number 602; photo around 1900

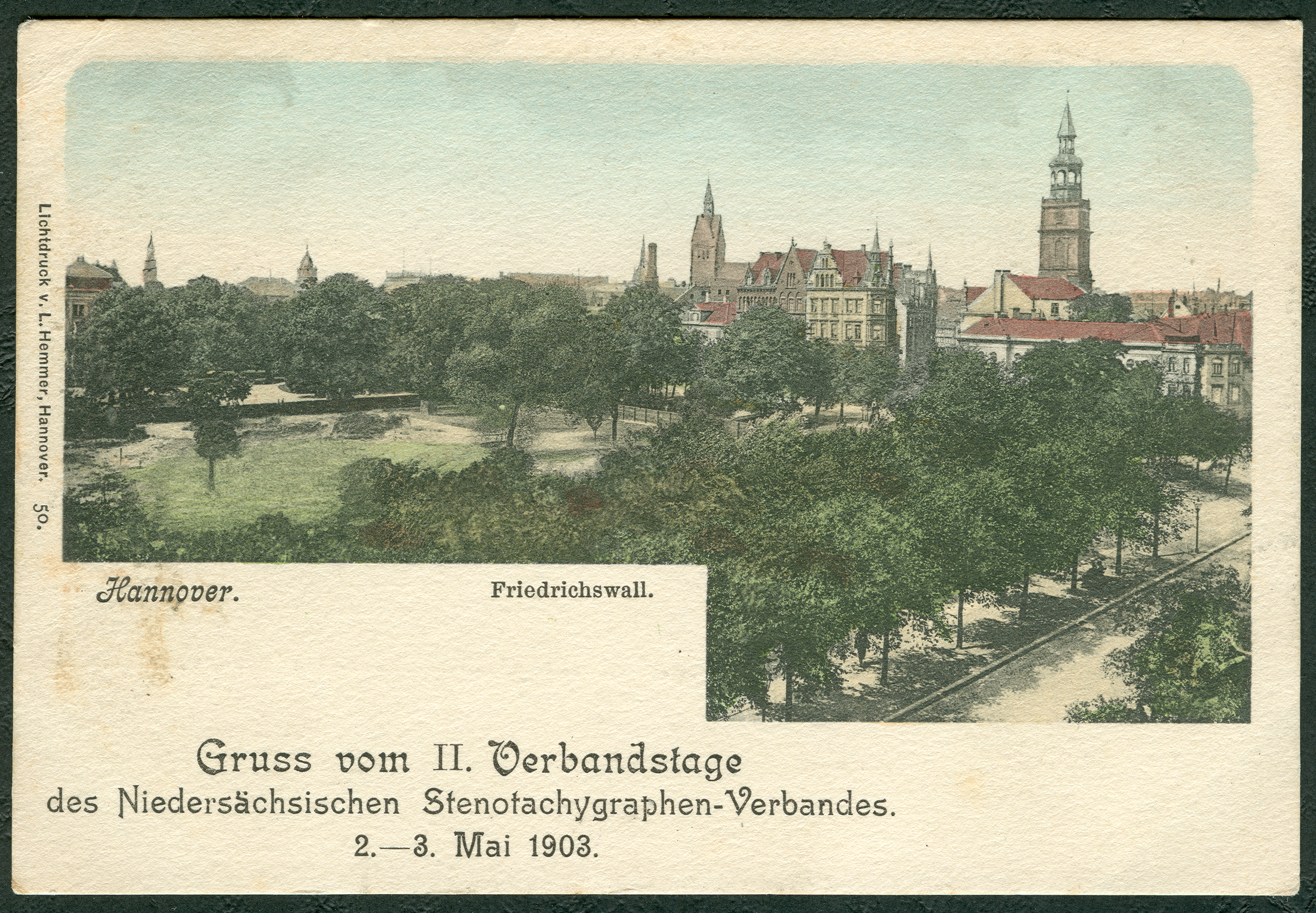

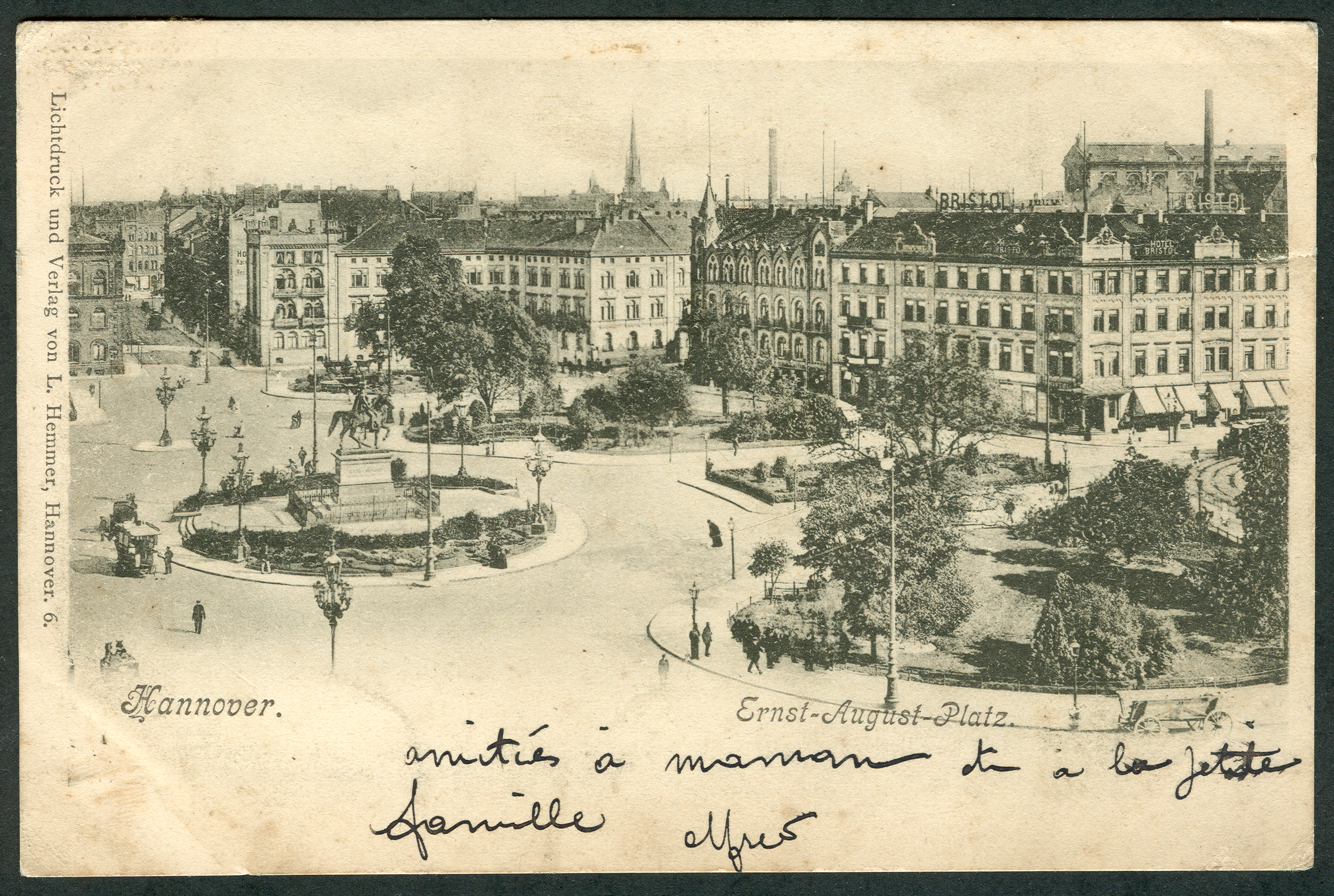
ca 1900: postcard Number 6 "Hannover. Ernst-August-Platz", collotype and publishing by Ludwig Hemmer

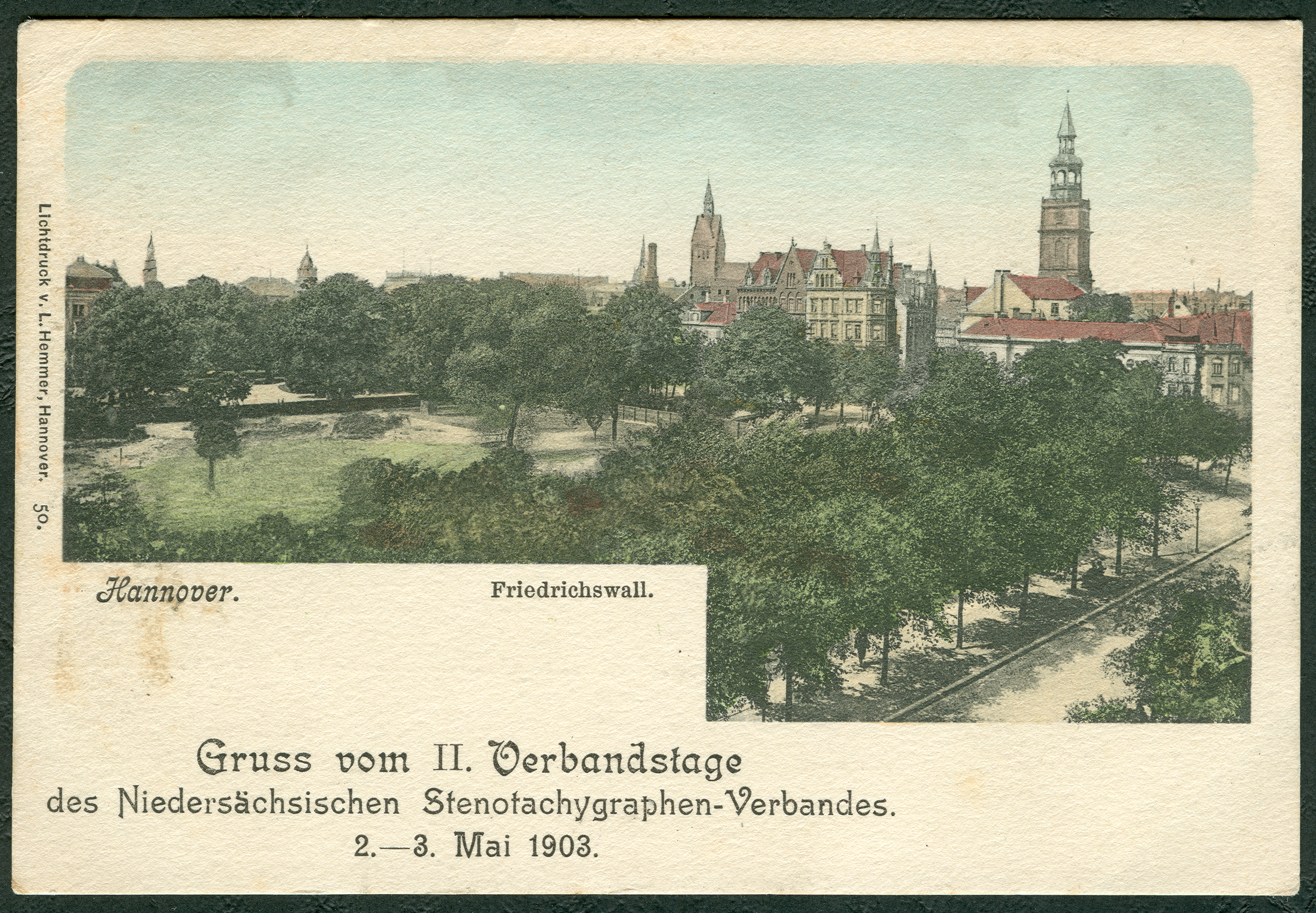
Coloured view from the Lower Saxony State Museum across the square of the not-yet-built New Town Hall to the Friedrichswall; the additional printing for the "II Association Day of the Lower Saxony Stenotachygraph Association 2.-3. May 1903" classifies this document as a so-called "event" or "souvenir" card

Ludwig Hemmer (? - 1925) was a German printer and graphic artist in Hanover. The versatile entrepreneur, photographer and publisher of numbered postcards distributed his works produced in collotype under the name "L. Hemmer".

== Life ==
The Graphische Kunstanstalt was founded in 1876 by a Mr Hammers († 1899). In 1897, Hemmer became a partner in the company, which then traded as "Hammers & Hemmer". In 1902, Hammers was no longer named when the firm was mentioned. In Paul Siedentopf's ...Buch der alten Firmen... (see further reading), next to the company logo "LH" in a square are the headings "Ludwig Hemmer, Graphische Kunstanstalt / collotype, prints, clichés, Designs, drawings, commercial art, advertising art" and as address Arnswaldtstraße 13, which was created as a street in 1888.

From this address, the picture postcard with the serial number 12 is known with a view of the Ernst-August-Denkmal, which was handwritten by "Ludwig Hemmer + Frau, geb. Buerschaper" and addressed to the family August Reese.

After Hemmer's death, the company became Walter Hemmer in 1925.

== Work ==
Similar to his Hanoverian colleague Karl Friedrich Wunder, Hemmer also produced

- a still unexplored number of numbered, partly also colorized picture postcards. So far, numbering greater than 600 could be identified.
- an unknown number of picture postcards without numbering.

Hemmer's Kunstanstalt provided the printing blocks of the text illustrations.

- Die Kunstdenkmäler der Provinz Hannover, edition commissioned by the Provincial Commission for the Research and Preservation of Monuments in the Province of Hanover by Dr. phil. Carl Wolff, Stadtbaurat, vol. III (Regierungsbezirk Lüneburg), 1. Kreise Burgdorf and Landkreis Fallingbostel, with 2 plates and 62 text illustrations, self-published by the Provincial Administration, Theodor Schulze's Buchhandlung, Hannover 1902
