= Olav Eldholm =

Norwegian geologist (1941 – 2022)

Olav Eldholm (12 May 1941 – 18 March 2022) was a Norwegian geophysicist.

He finished the cand.real. degree in marine geophysics at the University of Bergen in 1967. He then studied at the Lamont-Doherty Geological Observatory, Columbia University.

He was hired at the University of Oslo in 1974, finished the dr.philos. degree in 1976, and later returned to the University of Bergen. He headed the Institute of Geoscience from 2003 to 2009. He was inducted into the Norwegian Academy of Science and Letters in 1982 and the Academia Europaea in 1990.

His work, including his teaching, had a major bearing on the Norwegian petroleum industry. He was therefore knighted as a Knight, First Class of the Order of St. Olav in 2007. A submarine volcano at the Vøring Plateau, Eldhø, was named after him in 2021. Eldholm retired in 2009, but was active as a professor emeritus almost until his death in March 2022, aged 80.
