= Synnøve Liaaen Jensen =

Norwegian chemist (1932–2022)

Synnøve Liaaen Jensen (1 March 1932 – 22 April 2022) was a Norwegian chemist.

She took the dr.techn. degree in 1963 as the first woman in Norway, and became the first female professor at the Norwegian Institute of Technology. She was a professor of theoretical chemistry there from 1970 to her retirement. She also received an honorary degree at the University of Zurich in 1986. She was a fellow of the Norwegian Academy of Science and Letters and the Norwegian Academy of Technological Sciences.
