= Svein Eirik Fauskevåg =

Norwegian literary historian (1942–2022)

Svein Eirik Fauskevåg (5 August 1942 – 29 July 2022) was a Norwegian literary historian.

He was born in Harstad. He finished a magister degree in the history of ideas at the University of Oslo in 1969. In 1978 he began a Doctorate of Philosophy degree, defending a thesis concerning Marquis de Sade. From 1981 Fauskevåg was a professor of Romance literature at the University of Trondheim, mainly French. Fauskevåg was inducted into the Norwegian Academy of Science and Letters in 2003.

Fauskevåg mainly published his works in France. Beyond the subjects of his study being French, Sade studies were frowned upon at the University of Oslo in the 1970s. According to Martin Wåhlberg, he, in part due to his homosexuality, was considered an outsider in the 1960s. Fauskevåg, who remained unmarried, was also a convert to Roman Catholicism.
