= Magnus Thue =

Norwegian politician (1980–2022)

State Secretary of the Ministry of Finance
- In office 2020–2021

State Secretary of the Ministry of Trade, Industry and Fisheries
- In office 2018–2020

State Secretary of the Ministry of Education and Research
- In office 2016–2018

Personal details
- Born: 13 February 1980 Eidskog, Norway
- Died: 21 February 2022 (aged 42)
- Party: Conservative Party
- Education: University of Oslo

Magnus Thue (13 February 1980 – 20 February 2022) was a Norwegian politician. A member of the Conservative Party, he held various State Secretary positions: at the Ministry of Education and Research from 2016 to 2018, the Ministry of Trade, Industry and Fisheries from 2018 to 2020, and the Ministry of Finance from 2020 to 2021.

Thue died on 21 February 2022, at the age of 42.
