= Norvald Tveit =

Norwegian writer and playwright (1927–2022)

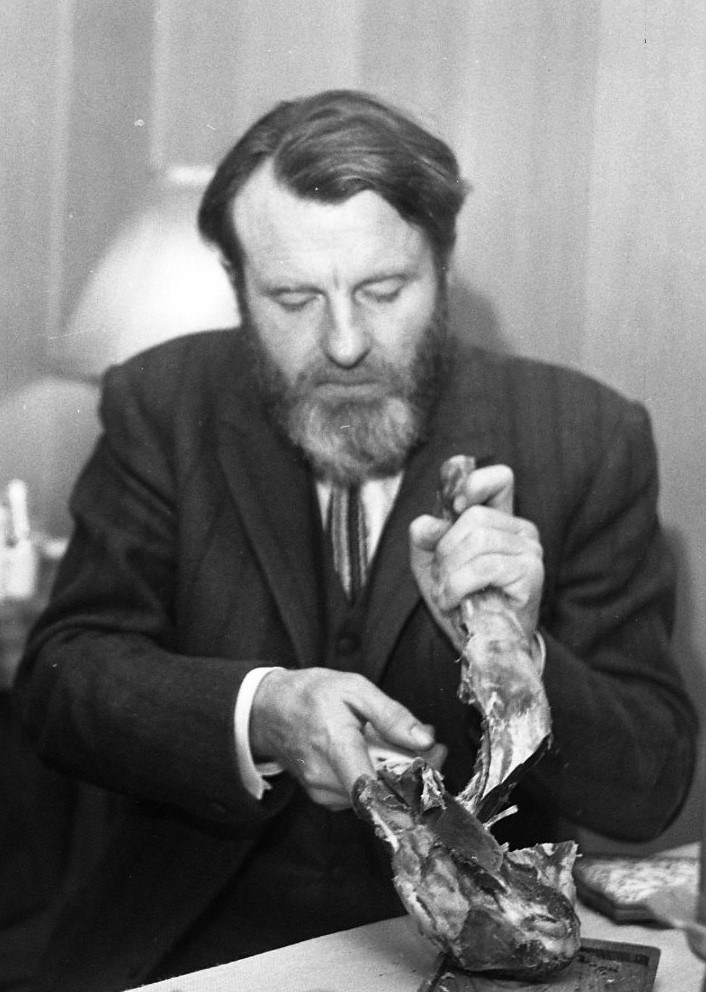
- Born: 22 December 1927; Leirvik, Hyllestad Municipality, Norway
- Died: 2 May 2022 (aged 94)
- Occupations: Writer and playwright
- Notable work: Splint (1977)
- Awards: Norwegian Ibsen Award (1993); King's Medal of Merit (2007)

Norvald Tveit (22 December 1927 – 2 May 2022) was a Norwegian writer and playwright, born in the village of Leirvik in Hyllestad Municipality.

== Career ==
Tveit made his literary debut in 1960 with the biografical story En sjel og en skjorte. His plays include the comedies Splint (1977), Ungkarsfesten (1998) and Uventa lykke for Anders Lone (2001), and I satans vald from 1986. He also wrote four episodes of the TV series Vestavind, and has written books on local history as well as biographies.

He was awarded the Norwegian Ibsen Award in 1993, for his overall dramatic contributions. He was awarded the Cultural prize of Sogn og Fjordane in 2003. In 2007 he received the King's Medal of Merit in gold.
