= Per Christian Hemmer =

Norwegian physicist (1933–2022)

Per Christian Møller Hemmer (14 May 1933 – 5 February 2022) was a Norwegian physicist.

He was born in Tromøy Municipality as a son of Alv Kristiansen and Hilda Møller. He married Ellen Vorvik in 1955.

He became a student in 1951 and graduated from the Norwegian Institute of Technology in 1956. He took the doctorate already in 1959, and was a research fellow at the University of Copenhagen from 1959 and the Rockefeller University from 1961. He led a project in Oslo between 1963 and 1965, was appointed as docent at the Norwegian Institute of Technology in 1969 and promoted to professor in theoretical physics in 1969. He was a member of the Norwegian Academy of Science and Letters from 1966 and the Norwegian Academy of Technological Sciences from 1967. He was vice president of the International Union of Pure and Applied Physics from 1984 to 1990. He has also contributed to the use of Norwegian language in university physics education, by writing introductory text books in both thermal physics and quantum mechanics that are used at NTNU and elsewhere.
