= Ketil Børde =

Norwegian civil servant and diplomat (1935–2022)

Ketil Børde (3 February 1935 – 27 February 2022) was a Norwegian civil servant and diplomat.

He was born in Oslo, is a political scientist by education and was hired in the Ministry of Foreign Affairs in 1959. He became deputy under-secretary of state there in 1981 before serving as Norway's ambassador to Switzerland from 1985 to 1989. Following a period as special adviser in the Ministry of Foreign Affairs from 1991 to 1994, he was Norway's ambassador to Sweden from 1994 to 2000.
