= Deaths in November 2022 =

The following is a list of notable deaths in November 2022.

Entries for each day are listed alphabetically by surname. A typical entry lists information in the following sequence:

- Name, age, country of citizenship at birth, subsequent country of citizenship (if applicable), reason for notability, cause of death (if known), and reference.

== November 2022 ==
=== 1 ===
- Mbazulike Amaechi, 93, Nigerian politician, minister of aviation (1963–1966).
- Lahbib Ayoub, 70–71, Western Saharan militant (Polisario Front).
- Harry Bates, 95, American architect.
- Bruce Bingham, 82, American sailboat designer.
- George Booth, 96, American cartoonist (Leatherneck Magazine, The New Yorker), complications from dementia.
- Tsuneo Fukuhara, 89, Japanese composer and music producer, aortic stenosis.
- Gael Greene, 88, American restaurant critic (New York), cancer.
- Steven Griffith, 61, American Olympic ice hockey player (1984).
- S. William A. Gunn, 96, Canadian surgeon.
- Moshe Ha-Elion, 97, Greek-born Israeli Holocaust survivor and writer.
- Vinny Harvey, 85, Irish Gaelic footballer (Éire Óg, Carlow) and manager.
- John Raymond Henry, 79, American sculptor.
- Albert G. Howson, 91, British mathematician.
- Filep Karma, 63, Indonesian Papuan independence activist, diving accident.
- Wilson Kiprugut, 84, Kenyan middle-distance runner, Olympic silver medallist (1968).
- Ernie Lazar, 77, American researcher, kidney disease.
- Trevor H. Levere, 78, English-born Canadian historian.
- James Litton, 87, American musician.
- Lu Shuming, 66, Chinese actor (A Terra-Cotta Warrior).
- Aydin Mammadov, 90, Azerbaijani politician.
- Max Maven, 71, American magician and mentalist, brain cancer.
- Romano Mazzoli, 89, American politician and lawyer, member of the U.S. House of Representatives (1971–1995) and Kentucky Senate (1968–1970).
- Vijayakumar Menon, 76, Indian art critic, writer and translator.
- Charles Nokan, 85, Ivorian academic and writer.
- Clay Pinney, 76, American special effects artist (Independence Day, Backdraft, Who Framed Roger Rabbit), Oscar winner (1997).
- Brent Pope, 49, Canadian ice hockey player (Cardiff Devils, Slough Jets, London Racers), cancer.
- Mashiur Rahman, 69, Bangladeshi politician, MP (1991–2006), heart attack.
- John Ross, 90, Canadian Olympic runner (1952).
- Patricia Ruanne, 77, British ballerina.
- Norman D. Shumway, 88, American politician, member of the U.S. House of Representatives (1979–1991), brain cancer.
- Karl Svoboda, 92, Austrian politician, member of the Municipal Council and Landtag of Vienna (1979–1996).
- Takeoff, 28, American rapper (Migos) and songwriter ("Versace", "MotorSport"), shot.
- Joseph Tarsia, 88, American recording engineer and studio owner (Sigma Sound Studios).
- Oswald Van Ooteghem, 98, Belgian politician, senator (1974–1987), member of the Flemish Council (1980–1987).

=== 2 ===
- Brent T. Adams, 74, American judge.
- Ela Bhatt, 89, Indian social activist, founder of SEWA and chancellor of the Gujarat Vidyapith (since 2015).
- Bubba Cascio, 90, American racehorse trainer.
- Ray Chénier, 87, Canadian politician, MP (1979–1984).
- Alan Chui Chung-San, 70, Hong Kong actor (The Rebellious Reign, Kung Fu vs. Yoga, Two Fists Against the Law).
- Leo Delcroix, 72, Belgian politician, senator (1991–1999), minister of defence (1992–1994).
- Jakob Eng, 85, Norwegian politician, MP (1973–1985).
- Mauro Forghieri, 87, Italian mechanical engineer.
- Gerald Geis, 89, American politician, member of the Wyoming Senate (1975–1987, 1993–2017).
- Dick Hall, 84, American politician.
- Nicholas Harding, 66, English-born Australian painter, Archibald Prize winner (2001), cancer.
- Mats Hillert, 97, Swedish metallurgist.
- Brigid Hogan-O'Higgins, 90, Irish politician, TD (1957–1977).
- Doc Kimmel, 95, American physician and politician, member of the Florida House of Representatives (1980–1982, 1984–1986).
- Bello Musa Kofarmata, 34, Nigerian footballer (Kano Pillars, Heartland, national team).
- Patricia Laurent Kullick, 60, Mexican novelist, complications from surgery.
- Dejan Mikavica, 58, Serbian historian and politician, deputy (2004–2007).
- Michael Möllenbeck, 52, German Olympic discus thrower (1996, 2000, 2004).
- Ronnie Radford, 79, English football player (Hereford United, Newport County) and manager (Worcester City).
- T. P. Rajeevan, 63, Indian novelist (Paleri Manikyam: Oru Pathirakolapathakathinte Katha), kidney disease.
- Sir Erich Reich, 87, Austrian-born British entrepreneur and philanthropist.
- Atilio Stampone, 96, Argentine pianist, composer and arranger.
- Jambey Tashi, 44, Indian politician, Arunachal Pradesh MLA (since 2009).
- Franco Tatò, 90, Italian businessman, CEO (1996–2002) and chairman (2002–2005) of Enel, chairman of RCS MediaGroup (2002–2003), stroke.
- Andrey Titenko, 103, Ukrainian-born Russian World War II veteran, Hero of the Soviet Union (1945).
- Emil Valtchev, 72, Bulgarian Olympic volleyball player.
- Ron Watts, 79, American basketball player (Boston Celtics).

=== 3 ===
- Fatima Bernawi, 83, Palestinian militant (Palestinian Freedom Movement).
- Marc Berthier, 87, French designer and architect.
- Richard E. Berendzen, 84, American astronomer.
- Lois Curtis, 55, American artist and disability rights activist (Olmstead v. L.C.), pancreatic cancer.
- Peter Danckert, 82, German politician, MP (1998–2013).
- Benoît Dauga, 80, French rugby union player (Stade Montois, national team).
- Alice Estes Davis, 93, American costume designer.
- Gerd Dudek, 84, German saxophonist, clarinetist and flautist.
- Ray Guy, 72, American Hall of Fame football player (Oakland/Los Angeles Raiders), Super Bowl champion (XI, XV, XVIII), chronic obstructive pulmonary disease.
- Sadek Hadjeres, 94, Algerian politician.
- Elinor Lander Horwitz, 93, American author.
- Colin Irwin, 71, British music journalist (Melody Maker), heart attack.
- Yocheved Kashi, 93, Israeli military officer.
- Lisa Lodwick, 34, British archaeologist, breast cancer.
- Noel McKoy, 62, British soul singer.
- Douglas McGrath, 64, American film director and screenwriter (Emma, Bullets Over Broadway, Saturday Night Live), heart attack.
- Kevin O'Neill, 69, British comic book illustrator (The League of Extraordinary Gentlemen, Marshal Law, Nemesis the Warlock), cancer.
- Uzzi Ornan, 99, Israeli linguist and social activist.
- Antonio Piva, 80, Italian politician, deputy (1994–2001).
- Eldon Raynor, 89, Bermudian cricketer (national team).
- Francis Rion, 89, Belgian football referee.
- Siegfried Stritzl, 78, American soccer player (New York Cosmos, national team).
- Tang Xiyang, 92, Chinese environmentalist.
- G. S. Varadachary, 90, Indian film critic and journalist.
- Henk de Velde, 73, Dutch seafarer, colon cancer.
- Wang Tao, 52, Chinese footballer (Dalian Wanda, Beijing Guoan, national team).

=== 4 ===
- Pyotr Aksyonov, 76, Russian politician.
- Dave Butz, 72, American football player (Washington Redskins, St. Louis Cardinals).
- Daniel Batalha Henriques, 56, Portuguese Roman Catholic prelate, auxiliary bishop of Lisbon (since 2018).
- James Chambaud, 95, French doctor, sporting director, and politician, mayor of Lons (1983–2014).
- Colia Clark, 82, American civil rights activist and politician.
- François Colimon, 88, Haitian Roman Catholic prelate, coadjutor bishop (1978–1982) and bishop (1982–2008) of Port-de-Paix, member of the SMM.
- David Davis, 86, American television writer and producer (The Bob Newhart Show, Taxi, Rhoda), Emmy winner (1979).
- Dow Finsterwald, 93, American golfer (PGA Tour, Senior PGA Tour), PGA Championship winner (1958).
- Doris Grumbach, 104, American novelist and literary critic (The New Republic).
- Manuel Hawayek, 77, Puerto Rican Olympic sport shooter (1972, 1976, 1984).
- J. J. Johnston, 89, American actor (Fatal Attraction, An Innocent Man, JFK), boxing historian and writer.
- Nicole Josy, 76, Belgian singer (Eurovision Song Contest 1973), fall.
- Mel Leckie, 38, Australian Paralympic cyclist (2008).
- Fazil Mammadov, 58, Azerbaijani politician, minister of taxes (2000–2017), kidney failure.
- Toralv Maurstad, 95, Norwegian actor (Song of Norway, The Pinchcliffe Grand Prix), director of the National Theatre (1978–1986).
- Balakh Sher Mazari, 94, Pakistani politician, caretaker prime minister (1993).
- Sidney Mobell, 96, American artist and philanthropist.
- Iso Moreira, 75, Brazilian politician, Goiás MLA (2001–2022).
- Ibrahim Munir, 85, Egyptian Islamic activist.
- Ken Plummer, 76, British sociologist.
- Alois Reicht, 94, Austrian politician, MP (1979–1988).
- Alvin Segal, 89, Canadian-American businessman and philanthropist.
- Bill Sheffield, 94, American politician, governor of Alaska (1982–1986).
- Bambang Subianto, 77, Indonesian economist and politician, minister of finance (1998–1999).
- Igor Sypniewski, 47, Polish footballer (Panathinaikos, Łódź, national team).
- John Warrington, 74, British-born New Zealand cricketer (Auckland, Northern Districts) and footballer (Birmingham City).
- Yang Shuzi, 89, Chinese engineer and academic administrator, president of HUST (1993–1997) and member of the Chinese Academy of Sciences.
- Alfredo Zecca, 73, Argentine Roman Catholic prelate, archbishop of Tucumán (2011–2017), heart failure.

=== 5 ===
- Luis Alegre Salazar, 58, Mexican businessman and politician, deputy (2018–2021), cardiac arrest.
- Hyder Ali, 79, Indian cricketer (Railways).
- Daniele Barioni, 92, Italian operatic tenor.
- Paul Bidwell, 73, British archaeologist.
- Barbara Boyd, 80, American politician, member of the Ohio House of Representatives (1992–2000, 2007–2014).
- Aaron Carter, 34, American singer ("Crush on You", "Aaron's Party (Come Get It)", "Leave It Up to Me"), drowned due to mixed drug intoxication.
- Alejandro Chomski, 53, Argentine film director and screenwriter (Today and Tomorrow, Feel the Noise, A Beautiful Life).
- Gabriela Cwojdzińska, 94, Polish pianist and politician, senator (1989–1991).
- Jeremy Davies, 87, English Roman Catholic priest and exorcist, co-founder of the International Association of Exorcists.
- Val Delory, 95, Canadian ice hockey player (New York Rangers).
- Tyrone Downie, 66, Jamaican keyboardist (Bob Marley and the Wailers).
- Peter Duus, 88, American Japanologist and historian.
- Ivan Eyre, 87, Canadian painter.
- Coy Gibbs, 49, American racing driver (NASCAR Craftsman Truck Series, NASCAR Busch Series), football player (Stanford Cardinal), and coach.
- Turhan Göker, 92, Turkish Olympic runner (1952).
- Han Zhiqing, 64, Chinese military officer and politician, deputy (2008–2013).
- Buddy Harris, 73, American baseball player (Houston Astros).
- Irène Kaufer, 72, Polish-born Belgian author, activist, and trade unionist.
- Ian Ker, 80, English Roman Catholic priest and scholar.
- Verdel Kolve, 88, American academic.
- Carmelo La Bionda, 73, Italian musician (La Bionda) and songwriter ("There for Me", "One for You, One for Me"), cancer.
- Bob Le Sueur, 102, British humanitarian.
- Michael Maccoby, 89, American psychoanalyst and anthropologist, heart attack.
- Kalevi Mattila, 87, Finnish politician, MP (1975–1995).
- John G. McKnight, 91, American engineer and businessman.
- Karmenu Mifsud Bonnici, 89, Maltese politician, prime minister (1984–1987).
- Shyam Saran Negi, 105, Indian school teacher, country's first voter.
- Herch Moysés Nussenzveig, 89, Brazilian physicist, member of the Brazilian Academy of Sciences and president of the Brazilian Physical Society (1981–1983).
- Tame One, 52, American rapper (Artifacts, The Weathermen, Leak Bros), heart failure.
- Bill Treacher, 92, British actor (EastEnders, The Musketeer, Dixon of Dock Green), COVID-19 and pneumonia.
- Yoshiaki Unetani, 78, Japanese Olympic runner (1972), pneumonia.

=== 6 ===
- John Alderson, 93, New Zealand cricketer (Canterbury).
- Mike Beard, 72, American baseball player (Atlanta Braves).
- Ali Birra, 72, Ethiopian singer.
- Paul Blackburn, 88, English cricketer.
- Michael Boyce, Baron Boyce, 79, British navy officer, chief of the defence staff (2001–2003), first sea lord (1998–2001), and member of the House of Lords (since 2003), cancer.
- Jake Crouthamel, 84, American football player (Boston Patriots), coach, and college athletics administrator.
- Eldred Evans, 85, British architect.
- Gary Wade Finley, 62, American racecar driver.
- Yann Gaillard, 86, French politician, senator (1994–2014).
- Carlo Galli, 91, Italian footballer (Roma, Milan, national team).
- Marketa Goetz-Stankiewicz, 95, Czech-born Canadian scholar and translator.
- Sheila E. Hixson, 89, American politician, member of the Maryland House of Delegates (1976–2019).
- Hurricane G, 52, American rapper (Hit Squad), lung cancer.
- Alan Jinkinson, 87, British trade union leader, general secretary of UNISON (1993–1996).
- Betty Johnson, 93, American singer.
- Tomm Kristiansen, 72, Norwegian journalist (NRK).
- Ellen Levine, 79, American media executive.
- Don Lewis, 81, American vocalist, electronic multi-instrumentalist, and electronic engineer.
- John McClelland, 71, Northern Irish firefighter, cancer.
- Peter McNab, 70, Canadian-born American ice hockey player (Boston Bruins, Buffalo Sabres) and broadcaster (Altitude), cancer.
- Paul McNaughton, 69, Irish rugby union player (Greystones RFC, Wanderers, national team).
- Robert Merkulov, 91, Russian Olympic speed skater (1956).
- Morteza Mohammadkhan, 76, Iranian economist and politician, minister of economy and financial affairs (1993–1997).
- Geraldo Nascimento, 86, Brazilian Roman Catholic prelate, auxiliary bishop of Fortaleza (1982–1997).
- Sig Ohlemann, 84, German-born Canadian Olympic runner (1960).
- Don Orehek, 94, American magazine cartoonist and illustrator (The Saturday Evening Post, Playboy, The Christian Science Monitor).
- Edward C. Prescott, 81, American economist, Nobel Prize laureate (2004), cancer.
- Wayne Riddell, 86, Canadian organist and conductor.
- Joel Sherzer, 80, American anthropological linguist, complications from Parkinson's disease.
- John Stone, 73, American law enforcement official and sheriff.
- Chaim Walkin, 77, Chinese-born Israeli Orthodox rabbi.

=== 7 ===
- Graeme Anderson, 83, Australian footballer (Carlton).
- Sir Roger Bhatnagar, 80, Indian-born New Zealand entrepreneur.
- Nahum Buch, 89, Israeli Olympic swimmer (1952).
- Michel Bühler, 77, Swiss singer-songwriter, poet and writer, heart attack.
- Michael Butler, 95, American theater producer (Hair).
- Ted Chiricos, 80, American criminologist, cancer.
- Jeff Cook, 73, American musician (Alabama), complications from Parkinson's disease.
- Philippe Corentin, 86, French author and illustrator.
- Chrysostomos II, 81, Cypriot Orthodox prelate, archbishop of Cyprus (since 2006), liver cancer.
- Eamonn Darcy, 89, Irish football player (Shamrock Rovers, Drumcondra) and manager (women's national team).
- Delia Domínguez, 91, Chilean poet.
- Donald Ewart, 92, American electrical engineer.
- Kendrick Frazier, 80, American science fiction writer and skeptic (Skeptical Inquirer).
- Frank Henry, 67, Irish Gaelic footballer (Shamrock Gaels, Leixlip, Sligo).
- Doug Johnson, 80, American politician, member of the Minnesota House of Representatives (1971–1972) and Senate (1977–2002).
- Nigel Jones, Baron Jones of Cheltenham, 74, British politician, MP (1992–2005) and member of the House of Lords (since 2005), complications during surgery.
- Wayne G. Kenyon, 89, American politician.
- Byoungho Lee, 58, South Korean computer scientist.
- Austin Noonan, 89, Irish footballer (Cork Celtic, Cork Hibernians).
- Brian O'Doherty, 94, Irish art critic.
- Tom Owen, 73, British actor (Last of the Summer Wine, Tottering Towers).
- Leslie Phillips, 98, British actor (Carry On, The Navy Lark, Harry Potter and the Philosopher's Stone) and author.
- Juan Pizarro, 77, Spanish physician and politician, mayor of Úbeda (1995–1999, 2003–2007) and deputy (1991–1993).
- Sir Evelyn de Rothschild, 91, British financier, chairman of The Economist (1972–1989), stroke.
- Héctor Sabatino Cardelli, 81, Argentine Roman Catholic prelate, auxiliary bishop of Rosario (1995–1998), bishop of Concordia (1998–2004) and of San Nicolás de los Arroyos (2004–2016).
- Éva Szabó, 77, Hungarian tennis player.
- Pilar Valero, 52, Spanish basketball player (Ros Casares Godella, national team).
- Jan Vermaat, 83, Dutch sculptor.

=== 8 ===
- Lee Bontecou, 91, American sculptor.
- Mary Lythgoe Bradford, 92, American editor (Dialogue: A Journal of Mormon Thought).
- Sir David Butler, 98, British psephologist, kidney failure.
- Viktor Cherkesov, 72, Russian intelligence officer.
- Jafrul Islam Chowdhury, 72, Bangladeshi politician, MP (1996–2013) and minister of environment (2001–2006).
- Alan Clarkson, 88, English archdeacon.
- Mario Conti, 88, Scottish Roman Catholic prelate, bishop of Aberdeen (1977–2002) and archbishop of Glasgow (2002–2012).
- Adrian Dingle, 45, American football player (San Diego Chargers).
- Will Ferdy, 95, Belgian comedian and singer.
- Sam Gardiner, 82, Northern Irish politician, MLA (2003–2016) and three-time mayor of Craigavon.
- Claes-Göran Hederström, 77, Swedish singer (Eurovision Song Contest 1968).
- Maurice Karnaugh, 98, American physicist, mathematician, and inventor (Karnaugh map).
- Pierre Kartner, 87, Dutch musician and songwriter (The Smurfs), bone cancer.
- William Frederick Knight, 88, British voice actor (Ghost in the Shell, Cowboy Bebop: The Movie, Akira).
- Mick Lawler, 80, Irish hurler.
- Lohithaswa, 80, Indian actor (Muniyana Madari, Athiratha Maharatha, Ellaranthalla Nanna Ganda), heart attack.
- Dan McCafferty, 76, Scottish singer (Nazareth) and songwriter ("Broken Down Angel", "Hair of the Dog").
- Daniel Mejías, 40, Andorran footballer (Montijo, Andorra, national team).
- Melody Miller, 77, American political aide, heart attack.
- Pirkko Nieminen, 83, Finnish Olympic gymnast (1960).
- Marie Poledňáková, 81, Czech film director (I Enjoy the World with You, Jak dostat tatínka do polepšovny, You Kiss like a God), screenwriter and writer.
- Peter Reith, 72, Australian politician, minister for defence (2001) and small business (1997–2001), MP (1982–2001), complications from Alzheimer's disease.
- Tang Youqi, 102, Chinese physical chemist, member of the Chinese Academy of Sciences.
- Christodoulos Taramountas, 65, Cypriot lawyer and politician, MP (2001–2006).
- Tenzin Pelsang, 56–57, Chinese Tibetan Buddhist monk and political prisoner. (death announced on this date)
- Tiutchev, 29, English racehorse.
- Karl Von Steiger, Canadian professional wrestler, heart failure.
- Bobby Wanbon, 78, Welsh rugby league player (St Helens, Warrington, national team).
- Yang Xusong, 60, Chinese politician, mayor of Shanwei (2015–2020).
- George Young, 85, American runner, Olympic bronze medallist (1968).
- Fernand Zago, 80, French rugby union player (US Montauban, national team).
- Zhang Quanjing, 90, Chinese politician, head of the organization department (1994–1999).

=== 9 ===
- Rasha al-Harazi, 25, Yemeni journalist and photographer, car bomb.
- Joan Andersen, 73, Canadian curler and journalist, euthanasia.
- Bao Tong, 90, Chinese political dissident, myelodysplastic syndrome.
- Rolando Boldrin, 86, Brazilian actor, singer and television presenter, respiratory and renal failure.
- Ivan Čarnogurský, 89, Slovak businessman and politician, people's deputy of Czechoslovakia (1992).
- Myrna Casas, 88, Puerto Rican playwright and stage actress.
- Dagny Corcoran, 77, American art book dealer.
- Gal Costa, 77, Brazilian singer.
- Michael Cross, 80, British Royal Air Force officer.
- Anne Fakhouri, 48, French author, cancer.
- Einārs Gņedojs, 57, Latvian footballer (Zvejnieks Liepāja, Skonto Rīga, national team).
- Jane Gross, 75, American sportswriter (Newsday, The New York Times).
- Roland Guillas, 86, French footballer (Bordeaux, Grenoble, national team).
- Mattis Hætta, 63, Norwegian singer ("Sámiid ædnan", Eurovision Song Contest 1980).
- Ham Kee-yong, 91, South Korean long-distance runner.
- Fred Hickman, 66, American broadcaster (CNN, ESPN, Black News Channel), liver cancer.
- Yurii Karmazin, 65, Ukrainian politician and judge, MP (1994–2006, 2007–2012).
- Hans-Joachim Klein, 74, German political militant (Revolutionary Cells).
- Lê Lựu, 79, Vietnamese writer.
- Charlotte Mayer, 93, Czech-born British sculptor.
- Bob Newman, 86, American football player (Washington State Cougars).
- Carlos Pacheco, 60, Spanish comics artist (Avengers Forever, X-Men: Legacy, Fantastic Four), complications from amyotrophic lateral sclerosis.
- Gabriela Pérez Paredes, 83–84, Chilean lawyer and judge.
- Joan Peters, 83, American dancer and choreographer, congestive heart failure.
- Oleksiy Remeniuk, 66, Ukrainian politician, MP (1998–2006), traffic collision.
- Garry Roberts, 72, Irish guitarist (The Boomtown Rats).
- Paul Schrade, 97, American trade union activist.
- Werner Schulz, 72, German politician, MP (1990–2005) and MEP (2009–2014), heart attack.
- Michael Shafir, 78, Romanian-Israeli political scientist.
- Behrouz Souresrafil, 71, Iranian journalist (Kayhan London).
- Kirill Stremousov, 45, Russian-Ukrainian politician and blogger, deputy head of the Kherson military-civilian administration (since 2022), traffic collision.
- Charles Wambebe, 76, Nigerian pharmacologist.
- John Webb, 86, British Olympic race walker (1968).

=== 10 ===
- Debra R. Anderson, 73, American politician, member (1977–1989) and speaker (1987–1988) of the South Dakota House of Representatives.
- Henry Anglade, 89, French road racing cyclist.
- Hédi Balegh, Tunisian academic, writer, and translator.
- Luigi Bartesaghi, 90, Italian-born Canadian Olympic cyclist (1960).
- Kevin Conroy, 66, American actor (Batman: The Animated Series, Justice League, Search for Tomorrow), intestinal cancer.
- Peter Dawes, 94, English Anglican prelate, bishop of Derby (1988–1995).
- Robert Eardley, 77, Bahamian Olympic sailor.
- Keith Farmer, 35, Northern Irish motorcycle racer.
- Roberto Guilherme, 84, Brazilian actor and comedian (Os Trapalhões), cancer.
- Humaydi Daham al-Hadi, 86, Syrian politician, co-governor of the Jazira canton (since 2014).
- Agustín Hernández Navarro, 98, Mexican architect and sculptor.
- Eugene F. Irschick, American teacher.
- Nitsa Marouda, 87, Greek actress (The Downfall, Teddy Boy agapi mou, Who Is Thanassis), heart attack.
- Gary Martin, 64, American journalist (Las Vegas Review-Journal).
- Lajos Máté, 94, Hungarian Olympic alpine skier (1948).
- Dillibe Onyeama, 71, Nigerian author and publisher, heart attack.
- Juan Carlos Orellana, 67, Chilean footballer (Colo-Colo, O'Higgins, national team), complications from amyotrophic lateral sclerosis.
- Vassilis Papazachos, 93, Greek seismologist, academic, and politician.
- Alan Park, 60, Canadian comedian and actor (Royal Canadian Air Farce), cancer.
- John Pochée, 82, Australian jazz drummer and bandleader.
- Frank Prihoda, 101, Czechoslovak-born Australian Olympic alpine skier (1956).
- Zuiyen Rais, 81, Indonesian politician, mayor of Padang (1993–1999, 2000–2003).
- Jack Reed, 89, American baseball player (New York Yankees).
- David Rhodes, 75, American author (Driftless).
- Billy Russell, 87, English footballer (Sheffield United, Bolton Wanderers, Rochdale).
- Hervé Télémaque, 85, Haitian-born French painter.
- Alfredo Torres, 87, Mexican footballer (Atlas, national team).
- Nik Turner, 82, British musician (Hawkwind).
- Ghulam-Sarwar Yousof, 82, Malaysian academic and writer.
- Yue Chi-ming, 78, Hong Kong actor (Aces Go Places 3, My Lucky Stars, From Vegas to Macau), complications from a stroke.

=== 11 ===
- Mina Adamaki, 78, Greek actress (Crying... Silicon Tears, Oi Treis Harites), cancer.
- John Aniston, 89, Greek-born American actor (Days of Our Lives, Love of Life, Search for Tomorrow).
- Rabin Banikya, Indian politician, member of the Assam Legislative Assembly (1996–2001, 2006–2011).
- Sir Ian Barker, 88, New Zealand jurist, King's Counsel (since 1973), judge of the High Court (1976–1997).
- Wally Bellett, 88, English footballer (Chelesea, Plymouth Argyle, Chester).
- Alphonse Bilung, 89, Indian Roman Catholic prelate, bishop of Rourkela (1979–2009).
- Ian Campbell, 94, Chilean Hall of Fame rugby union player (national team).
- Claudius de Cap Blanc, 69, French sculptor, suicide by gunshot.
- Jacques De Coster, 77, Belgian teacher and politician, member of the Brussels Regional Parliament (1989–1999, 2005–2009).
- Arthur Engel, 94, German mathematician.
- Per Flatberg, 85, Norwegian pharmacist and environmentalist.
- Gallagher, 76, American comedian, multiple organ failure.
- Serhii Khomik, 35-36, Ukrainian military helicopter pilot, shot down.
- Rajni Kumar, 99, British-born Indian educationist, founder of the Springdales Schools.
- Ronald Leighty, 92, American politician.
- Keith Levene, 65, English guitarist (The Clash, Public Image Ltd) and songwriter ("Flowers of Romance"), liver cancer.
- Choji Murata, 72, Japanese baseball player (Tokyo/Lotte Orions) and coach (Fukuoka Daiei Hawks), carbon monoxide poisoning.
- Rab Noakes, 75, Scottish musician (Stealers Wheel).
- Mikołaj Pomarnacki, 88, Polish Olympic fencer (1964).
- Henry Rosovsky, 95, American economist and academic administrator, cancer.
- Francisco Javier Sanz Alonso, 69, Spanish chess player.
- Wolf Schneider, 97, German journalist (Süddeutsche Zeitung, Stern, Die Welt), author and language critic.
- Siddhaanth Vir Surryavanshi, 46, Indian actor (Mamta, Kyun Rishton Mein Katti Batti), cardiac arrest.
- Sven-Bertil Taube, 87, Swedish singer and actor (The Eagle Has Landed, Puppet on a Chain, The Girl with the Dragon Tattoo).
- Ernesto Togni, 96, Swiss Roman Catholic prelate, bishop of Lugano (1978–1985).
- Sir Simon Towneley, 100, British author, lord lieutenant of Lancashire (1976–1997).
- Joan Vila-Grau, 90, Spanish painter and glassmaker.

=== 12 ===
- Jim Bohannon, 78, American broadcaster (America in The Morning, Larry King Show, Face the Nation), esophageal cancer.
- Gene Cipriano, 94, American woodwindist and session musician (The Wrecking Crew).
- Honor Dell Cleary, 84, Australian educator.
- John Connaughton, 73, English footballer (Manchester United, Port Vale).
- Zbigniew Cyganik, 89, Polish politician, voivode of Zielona Góra (1980–1982).
- David English, 76, British actor (A Bridge Too Far, Lisztomania), cricketer (MCC) and writer, heart attack.
- Samuel Folsom, 102, American marine pilot.
- Pierre Fournier, 72, Canadian cartoonist, co-creator of Red Ketchup.
- Budd Friedman, 90, American comedian and producer, founder of The Improv, heart failure.
- Tawanna P. Gaines, 70, American politician, bladder cancer.
- Cor van der Gijp, 91, Dutch football player (Feyenoord, national team) and manager (SC Veendam).
- Neva Gilbert, 93, American model (Playboy).
- Hideo Haga, 101, Japanese photographer.
- Henry Halliday, 76, British-Irish pediatrician and neonatologist.
- Carroll Hubbard, 85, American politician, member of the U.S. House of Representatives (1975–1993) and Kentucky Senate (1968–1975).
- Valérie Issarny, French scientist.
- Tharcisse Kasongo Mwema Yamba-Yamba, 70, Congolese journalist and politician.
- Goran Kovačević, 51–52, Serbian politician, deputy (since 2014).
- Henry R. McPhee Jr., 97, American government official.
- Mehran Karimi Nasseri, 76, Iranian-born stateless refugee, inspiration for The Terminal, heart attack.
- Kazuki Ōmori, 70, Japanese film director (Disciples of Hippocrates, Godzilla vs. Biollante, The Boy Who Saw the Wind), acute myeloid leukemia.
- Claude Perchat, 70, French graphic designer and illustrator.
- Frank D. Robinson, 92, American aeronautical engineer (Robinson R22, Robinson R44), founder of Robinson Helicopter Company.
- Klaus Peter Sauer, 81, German biologist and ecologist.
- Lolita Schneiders, 91, American politician, member of the Wisconsin State Assembly (1981–1997).
- Mohammad Nejatullah Siddiqi, 91, Indian economist.
- Velta Skurstene, 91, Latvian actress.
- Martha M. Vertreace-Doody, 76, American poet and author.
- Susan Wakefield, 79, New Zealand tax accountant.
- Steve Webber, 74, American baseball coach (Georgia Bulldogs).

=== 13 ===
- Heather Anderson, 28, Australian footballer (Adelaide), suicide.
- Julio Baraibar, 77, Uruguayan diplomat and politician, minister of labor and social affairs (2009–2010).
- René Bidouze, 99, French trade unionist, secretary-general of the Finance Federation (1963–1970) and Federal Union of State Trade Unions (1970–1978).
- Colin Campbell, 91, British petroleum geologist (Rimini protocol).
- Chuck Carr, 55, American baseball player (Florida Marlins, New York Mets, Milwaukee Brewers).
- Constantin Codrescu, 91, Romanian actor (The Bugler's Grandsons, The Sun Rises, The Mill of Good Luck).
- Alois Dauenhauer, 93, German politician, member of the Landtag of Rhineland-Palatinate (1975–1991).
- Mike Dixon, 85, English footballer (Luton Town).
- Willie Donald, 69, Scottish cricketer (Aberdeenshire, national team).
- Jerry Holland, 66, Irish rugby union player (Munster, national team) and coach.
- Anthony Johnson, 38, American mixed martial artist, hemophagocytic lymphohistiocytosis.
- Golam Mostafa Khan, 82, Bangladeshi dancer.
- Barbara Love, 85, American feminist writer.
- Dhanik Lal Mandal, 90, Indian politician, MP (1977–1984) and governor of Haryana (1990–1995).
- Brent Moss, 50, American football player (Wisconsin Badgers, St. Louis Rams), lung failure.
- Nodar Natadze, 93, Georgian linguist and politician, MP (1989–1995).
- John Noseda, 74, Swiss lawyer and politician, member of the Grand Council of Ticino (1979–1999).
- Sir Eldryd Parry, 91, British academic and physician.
- Éamon Phoenix, 69, Irish historian and author.
- Johanna Priglinger, 36, Austrian politician, member of the Landtag of Upper Austria (2013–2015).
- Bert Sitters, 80, Dutch Olympic swimmer (1960, 1964).
- Frederick Swann, 91, American organist, cancer.
- Guy Vassal, 81, French playwright.

=== 14 ===
- Sue Baker, 75, British television presenter (Top Gear), motor neurone disease.
- Kevin Beardmore, 62, English rugby league player (Castleford, Great Britain, national team).
- Geoff Cochrane, 71, New Zealand poet, novelist and short story writer.
- Frank Dooley, 93, American Olympic swimmer.
- Arden Eversmeyer, 90, American LGBT rights activist, founder of the Old Lesbian Oral Herstory Project.
- Zdenka Fantlová, 100, Czech actor, writer and Holocaust survivor.
- Werner Franke, 82, German molecular biologist, cerebral haemorrhage.
- Michael Hawkins, 83, American actor (Ryan's Hope).
- Mary Norbert Körte, 88, American poet.
- Johanna Lüttge, 86, German shot putter, Olympic silver medallist (1960).
- Kristie Macrakis, 64, American historian.
- Virginia McLaurin, 113, American social worker.
- Kay Meredith, 86, American equestrian, writer and novelist.
- Tommy Murphy, 79, Irish hurler (Rower-Inistioge, Kilkenny).
- Jan Nekovář, 59, Czech mathematician.
- Jean-Philippe Omotunde, 55, French-Cameroonian writer, heart attack.
- Pappu, 44, Indian cinematographer (Second Show, Koothara, Ayaal Sassi), amyloidosis.
- Vicky Phelan, 48, Irish cancer campaigner and malpractice suit plaintiff (CervicalCheck cancer scandal), cervical cancer.
- Jerzy Połomski, 89, Polish singer and actor.
- Jean Pontier, 90, French politician, deputy (1997–2002).
- Pál Révész, 88, Hungarian mathematician.
- Mohammed Al-Sanousi, 84, Kuwaiti politician, minister of information (2006).
- Aleksandr Sloboda, 102, Belarusian politician, member of the Supreme Council (1991–1994).
- Kiyoyuki Yanada, 57, Japanese voice actor (Ronin Warriors, Digimon, Perfect Blue), cancer.
- Adam Zieliński, 91, Polish lawyer and politician, president of the Supreme Administrative Court (1982–1992), MP (1989–1991) and ombudsman (1996–2000).

=== 15 ===
- Albert T. Blackwell Jr., 97, American jurist, justice of the Maryland Court of Appeals (1987–1990).
- Luiz Antônio Fleury Filho, 73, Brazilian politician, governor of São Paulo (1991–1994) and deputy (1999–2007), heart failure.
- Frida, 13, Mexican search and rescue dog (Mexican Navy).
- Shanghai Kate Hellenbrand, 79, American tattoo artist.
- Jarrick Hillery, 46, American football player.
- Tim Holt, 79, British statistician, director of the Central Statistical Office (1995–1996) and the Office for National Statistics (1996–2000).
- Geoff Howells, 87, Australian footballer.
- Veronica Hurst, 91, English actress (Laughter in Paradise, The Maze).
- Jin Tielin, 82, Chinese vocal coach, president of the China Conservatory of Music (1996–2009).
- Hideaki Kase, 85, Japanese historical revisionist.
- Vadym Khlupianets, 26, Ukrainian ballet dancer and soldier, shot.
- Krishna, 79, Indian actor (Sakshi, Pandanti Kapuram) and politician, MP (1989–1991), cardiac arrest.
- Pierre de Lagarde, 90, French historian and television producer.
- Heimo Linna, 96, Finnish politician, MP (1966–1987), minister of agriculture and forestry (1973–1975, 1975–1976).
- Alison Megarrity, 61, Australian politician, New South Wales MLA (1999–2011).
- Gustavo Moncayo, 69, Colombian human rights activist, liver cancer.
- Gulam Abbas Moontasir, 80, Indian basketball player (Bombay University, national team) and actor (Khoon Ki Takkar).
- Carolina Ödman-Govender, 48, Swiss physicist and academic, pancreatic cancer.
- Gene Perret, 85, American television producer and writer (The Carol Burnett Show, Welcome Back, Kotter, Three's Company), Emmy winner (1974, 1975, 1978), liver failure.
- Jimmy O'Rourke, 76, Scottish footballer (Hibernian, St Johnstone, Motherwell).
- John Palasik, 68, American politician, member of the Vermont House of Representatives (since 2019).
- Gudrun Parker, 102, Canadian filmmaker (Royal Journey, The Stratford Adventure).
- José León Sánchez, 93, Costa Rican novelist.
- Manuel Sanguily, 89, Cuban Olympic swimmer (1952, 1956), complications from COVID-19.
- Marcus Sedgwick, 54, British novelist (Floodland, The Book of Dead Days, My Swordhand Is Singing).
- Ikhtiyar Shirinov, 69–70, Azerbaijani lawyer and politician, prosecutor general (1992–1993).
- Luis Zingerle, 89, Italian politician, member of the Landtag of South Tyrol (1979–1988).

=== 16 ===
- Christopher Allmand, 86, English medievalist and historian.
- Nicki Aycox, 47, American actress (Dark Blue, Jeepers Creepers 2, Cold Case), leukemia.
- Raphael Bagoyan, 74, Armenian politician, minister of labor and social affairs (1995–1996).
- Michel Bourgeois, 82, French politician, deputy (2001–2002).
- Vadim Boyko, Russian colonel, suicide by gunshot.
- Bjørn Brinck-Claussen, 80, Danish chess player.
- Fernando Campana, 61, Brazilian designer (Campana brothers).
- Robert Clary, 96, French-American actor (Hogan's Heroes, Days of Our Lives, The Bold and the Beautiful).
- Christopher Duffy, 86, British military historian.
- Harry Dunlop, 90, American baseball coach (Kansas City Royals, San Diego Padres, Cincinnati Reds).
- Lucinda Florio, 75, American teacher, first lady of New Jersey (1990–1994).
- Austin Garvin, 76, Irish Gaelic footballer (Claremorris).
- Deborah R. Gilg, 70, American lawyer, U.S. attorney for the District of Nebraska (2009–2017), colon cancer.
- Tim Gimlette, 95, British physician.
- Mick Goodrick, 77, American jazz guitarist, complications from Parkinson's disease.
- Francisco Laranjo, 67, Portuguese painter, cancer.
- Carol Leigh, 71, American sex workers' rights activist, cancer.
- Mike Macaluso, 71, American basketball player (Buffalo Braves).
- Alexander Martynyuk, 77, Russian ice hockey player (Spartak Moscow, Soviet Union national team).
- Karupaiya Mutusami, 69, Malaysian politician, MP (since 2018), heart attack.
- Piotr Pankanin, 74, Polish chemist and politician, senator (1991–1993), MP (1993–1997).
- Peter J. Parsons, 86, British classical scholar.
- Michael Pertschuk, 89, British-born American attorney, commissioner of the Federal Trade Commission (1977–1984), pneumonia.
- David Ralston, 68, American politician, member (since 2003) and speaker (since 2010) of the Georgia House of Representatives, member of the State Senate (1993–1999).
- Gerhard Rodax, 57, Austrian footballer (Admira, Rapid Vienna, national team), hit by train.
- Isabel Salgado, 62, Brazilian Olympic volleyball player (1980, 1984), acute respiratory distress syndrome.
- David Sherman, 78, American novelist (StarFist).
- Nasser Takmil Homayoun, 85, Iranian historian.
- Abdul Majid Thuneibat, 77, Jordanian politician, senator (2007–2012).
- Les Wothke, 83, American college basketball coach (Winona State Warriors, Western Michigan Broncos, Army Black Knights)

=== 17 ===
- Ernesto Abaterusso, 66, Italian politician, deputy (1992–1994, 1996–2001).
- Aino Autio, 90, Finnish Olympic sprinter (1952).
- Annika Biørnstad, 64, Norwegian media executive (NRK).
- Fred Brooks, 91, American computer scientist (OS/360) and writer (The Mythical Man-Month).
- Jean-Michel Caradec'h, 72, French journalist and writer.
- Jimmy Cole, 90, American college football player (Memphis Tigers) and official.
- Azio Corghi, 85, Italian composer (Divara – Wasser und Blut) and musicologist.
- Charles J. Cunningham, 90, American lieutenant general.
- Nick Fisher, 63, British scriptwriter (The Giblet Boys), journalist and angler (River Cottage: Gone Fishing). (body discovered on this date)
- Michael Gerson, 58, American journalist (The Washington Post) and speechwriter, White House Director of Speechwriting (2001–2006), complications from kidney cancer.
- Aleksandr Gorshkov, 76, Russian figure skater, Olympic champion (1976) and president of the Figure Skating Federation of Russia (since 2010).
- Anne Harris, 58, American author ("Still Life With Boobs").
- Barbara Hyla-Makowska, 76, Polish teacher and politician, deputy (1993–2005).
- Daljeet Kaur, 69, Indian actress (Putt Jattan De, Patola, Singh vs Kaur).
- Teri Keane, 97, American actress (The Edge of Night, One Life to Live, Loving).
- Leslie Lazarus, 93, Australian endocrinologist.
- Dave Little, 91, Australian footballer (Collingwood).
- Don Luce, 88, American anti-war activist, coronary ischemia.
- Staughton Lynd, 92, American conscientious objector, peace activist, and civil rights activist.
- Ken Mansfield, 85, American record producer (The Beatles).
- Shettima Mustafa, 82, Nigerian politician, minister of agriculture (1990–1992), defence (2008–2009) and the interior (2009–2010).
- Charlotte Newfeld, 91, American LGBT activist.
- Tom Rice, 101, American soldier and paratrooper, complications from prostate cancer.
- Paul H. Roberts, 93, British physicist.
- Bert Seabourn, 91, American painter.
- Philippe Simonnot, 81, French economist and journalist (Le Figaro, Le Monde).
- B. Smyth, 30, American singer and songwriter, pulmonary fibrosis.
- Tomáš Svoboda, 82, French-born Czech-American classical composer and pianist.
- Larry Trujillo, 82, American politician.
- Udo Walendy, 95, German author and Holocaust denier.
- Ted Wheeler, 91, American Olympic middle-distance runner (1956).
- Irineu Sílvio Wilges, 86, Brazilian Roman Catholic prelate, bishop of Cachoeira do Sul (2000–2011).
- Ellen Wittlinger, 74, American author (Hard Love), Creutzfeldt-Jakob disease.

=== 18 ===
- Artashes Aznauryan, 84, Armenian doctor and politician, minister of health (1989–1990).
- Colin Bateman, 92, English footballer (Watford).
- Steve Braun, 63, American politician, member of the Indiana House of Representatives (2012–2014), cancer.
- Thelma Burns, 86, American community activist.
- Loren Cameron, 63, American photographer, author, and activist (Body Alchemy), suicide.
- Bruce L. Christensen, 79, American television executive, president of PBS (1984–1992).
- Myriam Cliche, 61, Canadian poet and illustrator.
- Derek Denton, 98, Australian biochemist.
- Youssou Diagne, 84, Senegalese politician, president of the National Assembly (2001–2002).
- Maureen Doherty, 70, British fashion designer.
- Tommy Facenda, 83, American Hall of Fame rock and roll singer and guitarist.
- Dwight Garner, 58, American football player (California Golden Bears, Washington Redskins), prostate cancer.
- Michael Hampe, 87, German theatre and opera director, and academic, general manager of the Cologne Opera (1975–1995).
- Dick Johnstone, 86, New Zealand Olympic cyclist (1964).
- Francis Joseph, 62, English footballer (Wimbledon, Brentford, Reading).
- Jean Lapointe, 86, Canadian actor (Orders, The Last Tunnel), singer and politician, senator (2001–2010).
- Liu Huaqiu, 82, Chinese politician, deputy (1987–1992).
- George Lois, 91, American art director (Esquire) and advertising executive, co-founder of Papert Koenig Lois.
- Sinikka Luja-Penttilä, 98, Finnish politician and writer, minister of social affairs and health (1979–1982).
- Neil MacLean, New Zealand jurist, chief coroner (2007–2015) and District Court judge (1993–2014).
- Michael Morris, 80, British-born Canadian visual artist.
- Per Arne Olsen, 61, Norwegian politician, governor of Vestfold og Telemark (since 2019) and mayor of Tønsberg (2003–2009), cancer.
- Manfred Palmen, 77, German politician, member of the Landtag of North Rhine-Westphalia (2000–2012).
- Ned Rorem, 99, American composer (Miss Julie, Bertha, Air Music), Pulitzer Prize winner (1976).
- Paul Ssemogerere, 90, Ugandan politician, MP (1962–1971), minister of internal affairs (1985–1988) and foreign affairs (1988–1994).
- Sever Sternhell, 92, Polish-born Australian academic and organic chemist.
- Tabassum, 78, Indian actress (Manjhdhar, Pyaar Ke Do Naam: Ek Raadha, Ek Shyaam) and television host (Phool Khile Hain Gulshan Gulshan), cardiac arrest.
- Päiviö Tommila, 91, Finnish historian, member of the Academy of Finland (since 2004).
- Rafi Usmani, 86, Pakistani Islamic scholar, mufti (since 1976) and president (since 1986) of Darul Uloom Karachi.
- Mervyn Wilson, 100, Irish Anglican priest, dean of Dromore (1990–1992).

=== 19 ===
- Ele Alenius, 97, Finnish politician, deputy minister of finance (1966–1970) and MP (1966–1977).
- Greg Bear, 71, American science fiction writer (The Forge of God, Queen of Angels, Blood Music), stroke.
- Shirley Bear, 86, Canadian Tobique First Nation artist and poet.
- Raymond Blanco, 87, American football coach and academic administrator (University of Louisiana).
- Kwesi Botchwey, 78, Ghanaian politician, minister for finance and economic planning (1982–1995).
- Jule Campbell, 96, American fashion reporter and editor (Sports Illustrated Swimsuit Issue).
- Kenley R. Dove, 86, American philosopher.
- Roger G. H. Downer, 79, Irish academic administrator, president of the University of Limerick (1998–2006).
- Rory Dwyer, 89, Irish footballer (Shelbourne).
- Mick Ellard, 76, Irish sports journalist (Irish Examiner).
- Nico Fidenco, 89, Italian singer and composer (Bury Them Deep, Supermen Against the Orient, Black Emanuelle).
- Jason David Frank, 49, American actor (Mighty Morphin Power Rangers, Sweet Valley High, The Junior Defenders), suicide by hanging.
- Herrad Frey, 89, French Olympic archer (1972).
- Hédi Fried, 98, Romanian-born Swedish author and Holocaust survivor.
- Flora Gasser, 89, Filipino actress (Inday Inday sa Balitaw, Moron 5 and the Crying Lady).
- Joëlle Guillais, 70, French writer, stroke.
- Danny Kalb, 80, American blues guitarist (The Blues Project).
- Gwendolyn Leick, 71, Austrian-born British historian and Assyriologist.
- Madan, Indian film director (Aa Naluguru, Pellaina Kothalo, Gunde Jhallumandi), stroke.
- Janine Magnin-Lamouche, 102, French Olympic hurdler (1948).
- Babu Mani, 59, Indian footballer (Mohun Bagan, national team).
- Simon Stock Palathara, 87, Indian Syro-Malabar Catholic prelate, bishop of Jagdalpur (1993–2013).
- Geórgia Quental, 83, Brazilian actress.
- Edward Staback, 85, American politician, member of the Pennsylvania House of Representatives (1985–2013).
- Tariq Teddy, 46, Pakistani comedian and actor (Salakhain).
- Daisy Tourné, 71, Uruguayan politician, MP (1995–2007, 2009–2020) and minister of the interior (2007–2009), pancreatic cancer.
- Tuan Tuan, 18, Chinese giant panda, euthanized.

=== 20 ===
- Gianni Bisiach, 95, Italian journalist and writer.
- Hebe de Bonafini, 93, Argentine civil rights activist (Mothers of the Plaza de Mayo).
- Farmer Brooks, 65, Canadian professional wrestler.
- Joyce Bryant, 95, American singer, dancer and civil rights activist.
- Aaroor Dass, 91, Indian screenwriter (Pasamalar, Vettaikkaran, Thaikku Thalaimagan).
- Norrie Davidson, 88, Scottish footballer (Aberdeen, Heart of Midlothian, Partick Thistle).
- Timothy F. Degnan, 82, American politician.
- Buster Drayton, 70, American boxer, IBF light middleweight champion (1986–1987).
- Lesley Elliott, 76, New Zealand domestic violence campaigner.
- Gray Frederickson, 85, American film producer (The Godfather, Apocalypse Now, The Outsiders), Oscar winner (1975).
- Sir Ian Grant, 79, British corporate director, chairman of Crown Estate (2002–2009).
- Michael Armand Hammer, 67, American businessman (Occidental Petroleum), cancer.
- Dave Hillman, 95, American baseball player (Chicago Cubs, Boston Red Sox, New York Mets).
- Djamel-Eddine Houhou, 88, Algerian diplomat and politician, minister of public health (1984–1988).
- Pascal Josèphe, 68, French businessman.
- Steve Kubby, 75, American political activist.
- Mickey Kuhn, 90, American actor (Gone with the Wind, Red River, Broken Arrow).
- Kay Lande, 92, American composer and singer.
- Albert Nipon, 95, American fashion designer.
- Gunilla Palmstierna-Weiss, 94, Swedish costume designer (Marat/Sade), Tony winner (1966).
- Jay Pasachoff, 79, American astronomer.
- Frank Rankmore, 83, Welsh footballer (Peterborough United, Northampton Town, national team).
- Riho Sibul, 64, Estonian singer and guitarist (Ultima Thule).
- Roland Storme, 88, Belgian footballer.
- Jean-Marie Straub, 89, French film director (From the Clouds to the Resistance, Sicilia!, The Chronicle of Anna Magdalena Bach).
- Hıncal Uluç, 83, Turkish journalist (Sabah) and writer.

=== 21 ===
- Stefan Bajohr, 72, German politician, member of the Landtag of North Rhine-Westphalia (1995–2000).
- Bill Bergan, 80, American college athletics coach (Iowa State Cyclones).
- Gabriel Camargo Salamanca, 80, Colombian politician and football executive, senator (1998–2002) and three-time president of Deportes Tolima, cancer.
- Andreas De Leenheer, 81, Belgian academic and biologist, rector of Ghent University (2001–2005).
- Michael Feingold, 77, American critic (The Village Voice), translator and playwright.
- Karim Gazzetta, 27, Swiss footballer (FC Winterthur, Lausanne Ouchy, Zrinjski Mostar), suicide by jumping.
- Kaoru Hoshino, 75, Japanese racing driver.
- Shah M. Abul Hussain, 85, Bangladeshi politician, MP (1996–2006).
- Ali Imam, 71, Bangladeshi children's writer.
- Wilko Johnson, 75, English guitarist (Dr. Feelgood), songwriter ("Roxette"), and actor (Game of Thrones).
- Patsy Kar, 87, Hong Kong actress (The Story of a Discharged Prisoner), COPD.
- Nuzhat Katzav, 90, Iraqi-born Israeli politician, MK (1974–1977).
- Vera Korsakova, 102, Russian politician, people's deputy of the Russian SFSR (1959–1963). (death announced on this date)
- Gary Lauk, 82, Canadian politician, British Columbia MLA (1966–1986).
- Jeremy Lloyds, 68, English cricket player (Somerset, Orange Free State, Gloucestershire) and umpire.
- Marijane Meaker, 95, American writer (Spring Fire), cardiopulmonary arrest.
- Kálmán Mészöly, 81, Hungarian football player (Vasas, national team) and manager.
- Avvai Natarajan, 86, Indian academic administrator, vice chancellor of Tamil University (1992–1995).
- Jürgen Nöldner, 81, German footballer (ASK Vorwärts Berlin, East Germany national team), Olympic bronze medallist (1964).
- Sylvie O'Dy, 71, French journalist and writer, editor-in-chief of L'Express (1987–2001).
- Ray Oldenburg, 90, American urban sociologist and author (Celebrating the Third Place, The Great Good Place).
- David Pownall, 84, British playwright.
- Reinaldo del Prette Lissot, 70, Venezuelan Roman Catholic prelate, auxiliary bishop (1994–1997) and archbishop (since 2007) of Valencia, bishop of Maracay (2003–2007).
- E. P. Sanders, 85, American New Testament scholar (New Perspective on Paul).
- Oleksandr Sharkovsky, 85, Ukrainian mathematician (Sharkovskii theorem).
- Abdul Samad Siddiqui, 87, Indian politician, MP (1988–1994).
- Josef Svoboda, 93, Czech-Canadian scientist and academic.
- Sally Todd, 86, American model and actress (Frankenstein's Daughter, The Unearthly, The Saga of the Viking Women and Their Voyage to the Waters of the Great Sea Serpent).
- Toma Tomov, 76, Bulgarian Olympic water polo player.
- Peter Trynchy, 91, Canadian politician, Alberta MLA (1971–2001).
- François Vendasi, 82, French entrepreneur and politician, senator (2005–2014), mayor of Furiani (1995–2014).

=== 22 ===
- Ki Joko Bodo, 58, Indonesian supranaturalist and actor (Terowongan Casablanca).
- Sir John Bourn, 88, British auditor, comptroller and auditor general (1988–2008).
- Edward S. Briggs, 96, American naval vice admiral.
- John Y. Brown Jr., 88, American businessman and politician, governor of Kentucky (1979–1983) and co-owner of KFC (1963–1971), complications from COVID-19.
- Dame Frances Campbell-Preston, 104, British courtier, lady-in-waiting to Queen Elizabeth The Queen Mother (1965–2002).
- Erasmo Carlos, 81, Brazilian singer-songwriter ("Sentado à Beira do Caminho"), kidney disease.
- Vic Carrabotta, 93, American comic book artist (Journey into Mystery, Strange Tales, Uncanny Tales).
- George Donnelly, 80, American football player (San Francisco 49ers).
- José Manuel Duarte Cendán, 86, Spanish psychiatrist and politician, senator (1977–1986), MEP (1986–1987, 1990–1994).
- Jean Dumesnil, 77–78, Canadian academic and cardiographer.
- Shems Friedlander, 82, American Islamic scholar and writer.
- Joe Hardstaff, 87, English cricketer (Free Foresters, Combined Services, Marylebone) and air commodore.
- Edward Kellett-Bowman, 91, British politician, MEP (1979–1984, 1988–1999).
- Raşit Küçük, 76, Turkish Islamicist
- Romeo Lahoud, 91, Lebanese theatre director and composer.
- Lin Yu-sheng, 88, Taiwanese philosopher and historian, member of Academia Sinica.
- Roberto Maroni, 67, Italian politician, minister of labour (2001–2006) and twice of the interior, president of Lombardy (2013–2018), brain cancer.
- Cecilia Suyat Marshall, 94, American civil rights activist and historian.
- Bernadette Mayer, 77, American poet and writer.
- Pablo Milanés, 79, Cuban singer-songwriter.
- Jack Pierce, 85, Canadian politician, Ontario MPP (1985–1987).
- Yurii Shukhevych, 89, Ukrainian dissident and politician, MP (2014–2019) and Hero of Ukraine.
- Peter Sternad, 76, Austrian Olympic hammer thrower (1972, 1976).
- Ota Ulč, 92, Czech-American author and columnist.
- Raymond Wieczorek, 93, American politician, member of the Executive Council of New Hampshire (2002–2012) and mayor of Manchester, New Hampshire (1990–2000).
- Urs Wild, 86, Swiss chemist.
- Geoff Wonfor, 73, English television director (The Beatles Anthology).

=== 23 ===
- Joyce Anderson, 90, Canadian painter and art teacher.
- Caroline Andrew, 80, Canadian political scientist and activist, complications from dementia.
- John Beasley, 78, American basketball player (Dallas/Texas Chaparrals, Utah Stars).
- Pierre Biémouret, 79, French rugby union player (SU Agen, national team).
- Paula D'Hondt, 96, Belgian politician, senator (1974–1991) and minister of public works (1988–1989).
- Milovan Danojlić, 85, Serbian poet, essayist and literary critic, member of the Serbian Academy of Sciences and Arts.
- Mladomir Puriša Đorđević, 98, Serbian film director (Girl, The Morning, Noon) and screenwriter.
- Clarence Gilyard, 66, American actor (Walker, Texas Ranger, Die Hard, Matlock).
- Hugo Helmig, 24, Danish singer-songwriter.
- Rudy Hernández, 90, Dominican baseball player (Washington Senators (1901–1960), Washington Senators (1961–1971)).
- Grant James, 87, American actor (Tombstone, One Piece, Bernie).
- David Johnson, 71, English football player (Ipswich Town, Liverpool, national team) and manager, throat cancer.
- Elvey MacDonald, 81, Argentine-born Welsh writer.
- Betty Ray McCain, 91, American politician and political strategist.
- Jorge Medina, 54, Bolivian civil rights activist and politician, deputy (2010–2015).
- O'dell Owens, 74, American physician, public health official and health advocate, medical director of the Cincinnati Health Department (2015–2016).
- John Rodgers, 92, American Anglican theologian and bishop.
- Enrique Rodríguez, 71, Spanish boxer, Olympic bronze medallist (1972).
- José Ruy, 92, Portuguese comic book author.
- Richard Shepherd, 77, British restaurateur (Langan's Brasserie).
- Muthu Sivalingam, 79, Sri Lankan politician, MP (since 1994).
- António da Cunha Telles, 87, Portuguese film director and producer (Os Verdes Anos, Belarmino, Without Fear or Blame).
- Éamonn Wallace, 63, Irish hurler (Erin's Own, Kilkenny).

=== 24 ===
- Christian Bobin, 71, French author and poet.
- Patrick Curtis, 83, American film producer (The Sorcerers) and actor (Gone With the Wind).
- Chanoch Ehrentreu, 89, German-born British rabbi.
- Hans Magnus Enzensberger, 93, German author and poet (Der Untergang der Titanic, The Number Devil).
- Moisés Fuentes, 37, Mexican boxer, WBO mini flyweight champion (2011–2013), complications from injuries sustained in a fight.
- Margaret Hamilton, 80–81, Australian publisher.
- Qairat Işçanov, 72, Kazakh politician, senator (2005–2017).
- Mimi Kilgore, 87, American arts patron.
- Taufik Kurniawan, 55, Indonesian politician, MP (2004–2018).
- Richard Lawrence, 80, American politician, member of the Vermont House of Representatives (2005–2019).
- Li Guowen, 92, Chinese novelist.
- Li Jingfei, 65, Chinese actor (Romance of the Three Kingdoms).
- James J. Lorimer, 96, American attorney, co-founder of Arnold Sports Festival.
- André Malherbe, 66, Belgian Grand Prix motocross racer.
- Seán McCague, 77, Irish sports administrator, president of the Gaelic Athletic Association (2000–2003).
- Neil Robinson, 65, English footballer (Everton, Swansea City, Grimsby Town), cardiac arrest.
- Issei Sagawa, 73, Japanese murderer and cannibal, pneumonia.
- Börje Salming, 71, Swedish Hall of Fame ice hockey player (Toronto Maple Leafs, Detroit Red Wings, Brynäs IF), complications from amyotrophic lateral sclerosis.
- Ismail Tara, 73, Pakistani actor (Haathi Mere Saathi, Chief Sahib) and comedian (Fifty Fifty), kidney failure.

=== 25 ===
- Thierry de Beaucé, 79, French civil servant and writer.
- Héctor Bonilla, 83, Mexican actor (Rojo Amanecer, Mina, Wind of Freedom) and director.
- Todor Boyadzhiev, 83, Bulgarian engineer and politician, MP (2001–2005).
- Preston Callison, 99, American attorney and politician, member of the South Carolina House of Representatives (1965–1966, 1969–1970).
- Irene Cara, 63, American singer ("Flashdance... What a Feeling") and actress (Sparkle, Fame), Oscar winner (1983), cardiovascular disease.
- Billy Gordon, 49, Australian politician, Queensland MLA (2015–2017).
- Mochamad Hasbi, 83, Indonesian army officer and politician.
- Beryl Kimber, 94, Australian violinist.
- Charles Koppelman, 82, American music executive (EMI) and co-founder of SBK Records.
- Edward Leier, 95, Polish-born Canadian ice hockey player (Chicago Blackhawks).
- Al Mair, 82, Canadian music industry executive and founder of Attic Records
- Alan Neaves, 97, Australian public servant and jurist, judge on the Federal Court (1983–1995).
- Don Newkirk, 56, American musician, composer and record producer.
- Sammie Okposo, 51, Nigerian gospel singer.
- Karel Oomen, 89, Belgian Olympic wrestler (1960).
- Roni Peiponen, 25, Finnish footballer (Klubi 04, Åsane, HJK Helsinki).
- Jacques Postel, 95, French academic and psychiatrist.
- Erzsébet Vasvári-Pongrátz, 68, Hungarian Olympic sports shooter (1992).
- Joan Viliamu, 56, Niuean politician.
- Sheila Vogel-Coupe, 93, British prostitute.
- Grahame Woods, 88, Canadian cinematographer (Wojeck) and writer (War Brides, Glory Enough for All).

=== 26 ===
- Henrie Adams, 68, Dutch orchestral conductor.
- Renato Balestra, 98, Italian fashion designer.
- Ann E. Berthoff, 96, American composition scholar.
- Daniel Brush, 75, American painter, sculptor and jeweler.
- Jens Bullerjahn, 60, German politician, minister of finance of Saxony-Anhalt (2006–2016) and member of the Landtag (1990–2016), complications from amyotrophic lateral sclerosis.
- Luciano Caramel, 86, Italian art critic and historian.
- Rochelle Costi, 61, Brazilian visual artist and photographer.
- Martin Drennan, 78, Irish Roman Catholic prelate, bishop of Galway, Kilmacduagh and Kilfenora (2005–2016).
- Al Falle, 79, Canadian politician, Yukon MLA (1978–1985).
- Vikram Gokhale, 77, Indian actor (Tadipaar, Prem Bandhan) and film director (Aaghaat).
- Fernando Gomes, 66, Portuguese footballer (Porto, Sporting CP, national team), pancreatic cancer.
- David Ray Griffin, 83, American professor, author (The New Pearl Harbor), and 9/11 conspiracy theorist, co-founder of the Center for Process Studies.
- Trevor Holmes, 83, English cricketer.
- Eleanor Jackson Piel, 102, American civil rights lawyer.
- María Dolores Juliano, 90, Argentine anthropologist.
- James B. Kaler, 83, American astronomer, complications from Parkinson's disease.
- Marcel Lefebvre, 81, Canadian screenwriter (The Rebels, There's Always a Way to Find a Way), composer, and lyricist.
- Lin Ling-san, 78, Taiwanese politician, minister of transportation and communications (2002–2006).
- Vladimir Makei, 64, Belarusian politician, minister of foreign affairs (since 2012).
- Antonino Mannino, 82, Italian politician, deputy (1983–1992).
- Chris Mitchell, 75, Australian footballer (Geelong, East Perth, Carlton).
- Robert Morris, 79, British historian.
- David Murray, 72, Barbadian cricketer (West Indies, national team).
- Monique Nemni, 86, Italian-born Canadian linguist and writer (Young Trudeau), heart attack.
- Albert Pyun, 69, American film director (The Sword and the Sorcerer, Cyborg, Captain America), complications from dementia.
- Mike Robinson, 66, American football player (Cleveland Browns).
- Freddie Roman, 85, American comedian and actor (Finding North, Red Oaks).
- Paul J. Swain, 79, American Roman Catholic prelate, bishop of Sioux Falls (2006–2019).
- Louise Tobin, 104, American jazz singer.
- Doddie Weir, 52, Scottish rugby union player (Newcastle Falcons, Border Reivers, national team), complications from amyotrophic lateral sclerosis.
- Charles Wolf, 96, American basketball coach (Cincinnati Royals, Detroit Pistons).

=== 27 ===
- Richard Baawobr, 63, Ghanaian Roman Catholic cardinal, bishop of Wa (since 2016) and superior general of the White Fathers (2010–2016).
- Robert Blum, 94, American Olympic fencer (1964, 1968).
- Gábor Csapó, 72, Hungarian water polo player, Olympic champion (1976), respiratory failure.
- Audrey Eagle, 97, New Zealand botanical illustrator.
- Jake Flint, 37, American Red Dirt singer-songwriter.
- Henry Grossman, 86, American photographer, fall.
- Freddie Ross Hancock, 92, British-American publicist.
- Brian Hogan, 74, English rugby league player (St Helens, Wigan, national team).
- Barbara Marty Kälin, 68, Swiss politician, councillor (2000–2007).
- Stavros Katsanevas, 69, Greek-French astrophysicist.
- Allen Kay, 77, American advertising executive and entrepreneur.
- Daniela Maccelli, 72, Italian Olympic gymnast (1968).
- Dame Clare Marx, 68, British surgeon, president of the Royal College of Surgeons of England (2014–2017), pancreatic cancer.
- James J. McNamara, 95, American politician, member of the Vermont House of Representatives (1994–2000).
- Mick Meagan, 88, Irish football player (Everton, Huddersfield Town, national team) and manager.
- Oscar White Muscarella, 91, American archaeologist, complications from lymphoma, vascular disease, and COVID-19.
- Monty's Pass, 29, Irish racehorse. (death announced on this date)
- Joan Neiman, 102, Canadian politician, senator (1972–1995).
- Maurice Norman, 88, English footballer (Tottenham Hotspur, Norwich City, national team), cancer.
- Mehmet Oğuz, 73, Turkish footballer (Galatasaray, Fenerbahçe, national team).
- Gianfranco Piccioli, 78, Italian film director, screenwriter (The Flower with the Petals of Steel) and film producer (Beach House, Bix).
- Shen Qihan, 100, Chinese geologist, member of the Chinese Academy of Sciences.
- James Reardon-Anderson, 78, American academic administrator and scholar.
- Yoichi Sai, 73, Japanese film director (A Sign Days, All Under the Moon, Blood and Bones) and screenwriter, bladder cancer.
- Rupert Scofield, 73, American financier.
- Harry Vandermeulen, 94, Belgian politician, governor of Limburg (1978–1995).
- Liz VanLeeuwen, 97, American politician, member of the Oregon House of Representatives (1981–1999).
- Francesc Vendrell i Vendrell, 82, Spanish diplomat.
- Bernard Viot, 85, French racing cyclist.
- Murray Waxman, 97, Canadian Olympic basketball player (1948).
- Sir Allan Wright, 93, New Zealand farming leader, businessman and sports administrator, president of Federated Farmers (1977–1981), chancellor of Lincoln University (1990–1994).
- James Wright, 94, Australian doctor and media personality.
- Elena Xausa, 38, Italian illustrator, appendiceal cancer.
- Hans Zehetmair, 86, German politician, member of the Landtag of Bavaria (1974–1978, 1990–2003).
- Tim Zuck, 75, Canadian painter, complications from dementia.

=== 28 ===
- Nawawi Ahmad, 61, Malaysian politician, MP (2013–2018) and Kedah MLA (2004–2013).
- Takeshi Aragaki, 66, Japanese Go player.
- Rob Armitage, 65, Canadian curler, World Senior champion (2013), pancreatic cancer.
- Danny Belisle, 85, Canadian ice hockey player (New York Rangers) and coach (Washington Capitals).
- Jean Calder, 89, Australian humanitarian worker.
- Lucia Capacchione, 85, Italian-American psychologist and art therapist.
- Jim Cody, 79, Australian rugby league footballer (Western Suburbs).
- Bernard Crettaz, 84, Swiss sociologist and ethnologist.
- Sandy Dawson, 50, Australian barrister, brain cancer.
- Gilson Dipp, 78, Brazilian jurist and magistrate, minister of the Superior Court of Justice (1998–2014).
- Cliff Emmich, 85, American actor (Payday, Thunderbolt and Lightfoot, Mouse Hunt), lung cancer.
- Carlo Facchin, 84, Italian football player (Reggiana, Reggina) and manager (women's national team).
- John Heron, 94, British social scientist.
- Davor Janjić, 53, Bosnian actor (A Little Bit of Soul, My Uncle's Legacy, Welcome to Sarajevo).
- Shajahan Khan, 70, Bangladeshi politician, MP (1996).
- Sir Michael Knight, 90, British Royal Air Force officer.
- Tomáš Kvapil, 66, Czech politician, minister of regional development (1997–1998) and MP (1998–2010).
- Ramsay MacMullen, 94, American historian.
- Abdulaziz al-Maqaleh, 85, Yemeni poet and writer.
- Donald McEachin, 61, American politician, member of the U.S. House of Representatives (since 2017), member of the Virginia Senate (2008–2017) and twice of the House of Delegates, colorectal cancer.
- Jenny McLeod, 81, New Zealand composer and music theorist.
- S. M. Muneer, 77, Pakistani businessman and industrialist.
- Kunio Nakamura, 83, Japanese conglomerate executive, president of Panasonic (2000–2005), pneumonia.
- Jacob Needleman, 88, American philosopher.
- Andrew Nickolds, 73, British television writer (Agony, The Lenny Henry Show, Crown Court).
- Rajko Petrov Nogo, 77, Serbian poet and essayist.
- O Taeseok, 82, South Korean playwright and theatre director.
- Dieter Oesterhelt, 82, German biochemist.
- Sir Michael Parker, 81, British army officer and event organiser.
- Tom Phillips, 85, English artist (A Humument), cancer.
- Torben Rechendorff, 85, Danish politician, minister for ecclesiastical affairs (1988–1993) and MP (1990–1998).
- Nello Sbaiz, 81, Italian football player (AS Saint-Étienne, FC Lorient) and manager (FC Lorient).
- Peter Schmid, 95, German archaeologist.
- Norman Snow, 72, American actor (The Last Starfighter, Man from Atlantis, Manhunter).
- Jan Steinhauser, 78, Dutch Olympic rower (1968).
- Milton Street, 81, American businessman and politician, member of the Pennsylvania State Senate (1981–1984) and House of Representatives (1979–1980).
- Volodymyr Vakulenko, 50, Ukrainian poet and children's writer. (death announced on this date)
- Toru Watanabe, 61, Japanese actor and singer, sepsis.

=== 29 ===
- Jakes Abeberry, 92, French lawyer, politician, and writer.
- Mike Addesa, 77, American college ice hockey coach (Holy Cross, Rensselaer, Boston Bulldogs).
- Andrés Balanta, 22, Colombian footballer (Deportivo Cali, Atlético Tucumán, national U-23 team), cardiac arrest.
- Mohamed Betchine, 88, Algerian military officer and politician.
- Mike Blake, 66, Canadian ice hockey player (Los Angeles Kings), cancer.
- Anthony Hampden Dickson, 87, Jamaican Roman Catholic prelate, bishop of Bridgetown (1971–1995).
- Ljubomir Đurković, 70, Montenegrin writer and poet.
- Edmund Freibauer, 85, Austrian politician, president of the Landtag of Lower Austria (1998–2008).
- Sigurd Frisvold, 75, Norwegian military officer, chief of defence (1999–2005).
- Derek Granger, 101, British film and television producer, and screenwriter (Brideshead Revisited, A Handful of Dust, Where Angels Fear to Tread).
- Alistair Grimason, 65, Irish Anglican priest, dean of Tuam (since 2000).
- Brad William Henke, 56, American actor (Orange Is the New Black, Bright) and football player (Denver Broncos).
- Steve Jensen, 67, American Olympic ice hockey player (1976).
- Kevin Johnson Jr., 37, American convicted murderer, execution by lethal injection.
- Aline Kominsky-Crumb, 74, American underground comics artist (Twisted Sisters, Wimmen's Comix, Weirdo), pancreatic cancer.
- Robert Lawlor, 84, American mythographer and symbologist.
- Tapunuu Niko Lee Hang, 68, Samoan politician, minister of finance (2006–2011) and MP (since 2001).
- Serge Livrozet, 83, French writer and actor (Time Out).
- Albert J. McNeil, 102, American choral conductor, founder of the Albert McNeil Jubilee Singers.
- Hiroshi Miyamura, 97, American soldier, Medal of Honor recipient.
- Mohd Hashim Mustapha, 56, Malaysian football player (Kelantan, Kedah, national team) and manager, complications from diabetes.
- Jeff Moore, 56, American college basketball player (Auburn Tigers).
- Gray Nelson, 95, New Zealand public servant and diplomat.
- Adam Ostrowski, 77, Polish Olympic wrestler (1968, 1972, 1976).
- Ouija Board, 21, British Thoroughbred racehorse.
- John Prados, 71, American author and historian.
- Lee W. Quimby, 90, American politician, member of the New Hampshire House of Representatives (2000–2002).
- Jagmel Singh Rooprai, 78, Kenyan Olympic field hockey player.
- Galina Savelyeva, 94, Russian gynaecologist.
- Joceline Schriemer, 62, Canadian politician.
- Richard Shelton, 89, American author and poet.
- Stephen Alexander Smith, 64, Canadian legal scholar.
- Antônio Soares Dias, 77, Brazilian lawyer and politician, deputy (1983–1990).
- Chuck Stobart, 90, American college football player (Ohio Bobcats) and coach (Toledo Rockets, Utah Utes).
- Lisa Vollmer, 85, German politician, member of the Landtag of Hesse (1985–1999).
- Richard Waller, 93, American clarinetist.
- Rodney Ward, 81, British Olympic figure skater.

=== 30 ===
- Al Bemiller, 84, American football player (Buffalo Bills).
- Ashley Bickerton, 63, Barbadian-born American visual artist, complications from amyotrophic lateral sclerosis.
- Anne Cameron, 84, Canadian author (Dreamspeaker, Orca's Song).
- Anne Green, 71, Australian swimming coach, cancer.
- Robert Gulden, 74, American cave surveyor and cartographer.
- Evert Gunnarsson, 92, Swedish rower, Olympic silver medalist (1956).
- John Hadl, 82, American Hall of Fame football player (Kansas Jayhawks, San Diego Chargers, Los Angeles Rams) and coach.
- Sir Murray Halberg, 89, New Zealand middle-distance runner, Olympic champion (1960).
- George C. Herring, 86, American historian, lung cancer.
- Olive Mary Hilliard, 97, South African botanist and taxonomist.
- Christiane Hörbiger, 84, Austrian actress (The Major and the Bulls, Das Erbe der Guldenburgs, Julia – Eine ungewöhnliche Frau).
- Billy Hudson, 84, American politician, member of the Mississippi State Senate (2008–2020).
- Jean-Louis Idiart, 72, French politician, deputy (1993–2012).
- Jiang Zemin, 96, Chinese politician, general secretary of the Communist Party (1989–2002) and president (1993–2003), mayor of Shanghai (1985–1988), leukemia and multiple organ failure.
- Seiichi Kanai, 82, Japanese professional golfer.
- Nagnath Lalujirao Kottapalle, 74, Indian writer and academic administrator, vice-chancellor of Dr. Babasaheb Ambedkar Marathwada University (1988–1991).
- Christine McVie, 79, English Hall of Fame musician (Fleetwood Mac) and songwriter ("Don't Stop", "Everywhere"), stroke.
- Shirley Meredeen, 92, British journalist and activist.
- Ray Nelson, 91, American science fiction writer (The Ganymede Takeover, The Prometheus Man).
- Kumble Sundara Rao, 88, Indian Yakshagana artist and politician, Karnataka MLA (1994–1999).
- Davide Rebellin, 51, Italian Olympic racing cyclist (1992, 2008), traffic collision.
- Othman Saadi, 91–92, Algerian writer, diplomat, and politician, MP (1977–1982).
- Elena Santoni, 92, Italian Olympic gymnast (1948).
- Arlo Schmidt, 91, American politician, member of the North Dakota House of Representatives (1995–2010).
- Federico Silva, 99, Mexican painter and sculptor.
- Pete Sutherland, 71, American folk musician, euthanasia.
- Uruguay Tourné, 93, Uruguayan politician, MP (1963–1973, 1985–1989).
- David Tringham, 87, British assistant director (Robin Hood: Prince of Thieves, Highlander, Dirty Rotten Scoundrels).
- Meinhard von Gerkan, 87, German architect (Berlin Tegel Airport, Berlin Hauptbahnhof), co-founder of Gerkan, Marg and Partners.
- Shatzi Weisberger, 92, American civil rights activist.
- Steve Witiuk, 93, Canadian ice hockey player (Chicago Blackhawks).
- Hale Zukas, 79, American disability rights activist.
