= Velta =

Velta is both a surname and a given name.

== Given name ==
Velta
- Gender: Female
- Name day: 24 November

Origin
- Meaning: Gift
- Region of origin: Latvia

Velta is a feminine Latvian given name. Notable individuals named Velta include:

- Velta Benn (1917–2010), American pilot
- Velta Līne (1923–2012), Latvian actress
- Velta Ruke-Dravina (1917–2003), Latvian linguist and folklorist
- Velta Skurstene (1930–2022), Latvian actress
- Velta Sniķere (born 1920), Latvian poet
- Velta Toma (1912–1999), Latvian poet

== Surname ==
Notable people with the surname Velta include:

- Rune Velta (born 1989), Norwegian ski jumper
