= Donald Ewart =

American electrical engineer (1930–2022)

- Born: Donald Norton Ewart; July 16, 1930; Buffalo, New York, U.S.
- Died: November 7, 2022 (aged 92); Fort Mill, South Carolina, U.S.
- Education: Cornell University; Union College
- Occupation: Electrical engineer

Donald Norton Ewart (July 16, 1930 – November 7, 2022) was an American electrical engineer.

== Life and career ==
Ewart was born in Buffalo, New York on July 16, 1930, the son of Joseph Norton Ewart and Mildred Lane Cushing. He attended Cornell University, earning his BS degree in electrical engineering in 1954. He also earned his MSEE degree at Union College, and served as a first lieutenant in the Wright-Patterson Air Force Base in Dayton, Ohio.

In 1960, Ewart joined General Electric (GE), a multinational conglomerate in Schenectady, New York. During his time at GE, he specialized in the field of interconnected power systems and worked in the department of utility systems engineering, holding the titles of systems dynamics and control manager in 1969, and systems engineering manager in 1977. In 1978, he was named a fellow of the Institute of Electrical and Electronics Engineers, "for pioneering contributions to the analysis of the control and dynamics of large-scale electric power systems".

== Death ==
Ewart died at his home in Fort Mill, South Carolina on November 7, 2022, at the age of 92.
