= Jean Pontier =

French politician (1932–2022)

Member of the French National Assembly
- In office 5 July 1997 – 18 June 2002
- Preceded by: Jacques Dondoux (acting)
- Succeeded by: Gérard Weber
- Constituency: Ardèche's 2nd constituency

Mayor of Tournon-sur-Rhône
- In office 25 March 2001 – 22 March 2008
- Preceded by: Jean-Pierre Frachisse
- Succeeded by: Frédéric Sausset

Member of the General Council of Ardèche
- In office 27 March 1994 – 18 March 2001
- Preceded by: André Tourasse
- Succeeded by: Maurice Quinkal
- Constituency: Canton of Tournon-sur-Rhône

Mayor of Saint-Jean-de-Muzols
- In office 24 March 1989 – 4 July 1997
- Preceded by: Noël Passas
- Succeeded by: Maurice Plantier

Personal details
- Born: 13 November 1932 Nîmes, France
- Died: 14 November 2022 (aged 90) Tournon-sur-Rhône, France
- Party: PRG

Jean Pontier (13 November 1932 – 14 November 2022) was a French politician of the Radical Party of the Left. He was notably mayor of Saint-Jean-de-Muzols from 1989 to 1997, a member of the General Council of Ardèche from 1994 to 2007, a member of the National Assembly for Ardèche's 2nd constituency from 1997 to 2002, and mayor of Tournon-sur-Rhône from 2001 to 2008.

Pontier died in Tournon-sur-Rhône on 14 November 2022, at the age of 90.
