= Yang Xusong =

Chinese politician (1962–2022)

Mayor of Shanwei
- In office August 2015 – January 2020
- Preceded by: Wu Zili
- Succeeded by: Lu Feng

Personal details
- Born: February 1962 Jingzhou, Hubei, China
- Died: 8 November 2022 (aged 60) Shenzhen, Guangdong, China
- Party: CCP
- Education: Hubei University; Xi'an Jiaotong University

Yang Xusong (Chinese: 杨绪松; February 1962 – 8 November 2022) was a Chinese politician. A member of the Communist Party, he served as mayor of Shanwei from 2015 to 2020.

On 24 February 2018, he was elected as the representative of the 13th National People's Congress.

Yang died in Shenzhen on 8 November 2022, at the age of 60.
