= Alphonse Bilung =

Indian Roman Catholic prelate (1933–2022)

His Excellency Alphonse Bilung
- Bishop Emeritus of Rourkela
- Archdiocese: Cuttack-Bhubaneswar
- Appointed: 4 July 1979
- Term ended: 2 April 2009
- Predecessor: Post created
- Successor: John Barwa

Orders
- Ordination: 3 October 1961
- Consecration: 3 November 1979 by Henry Sebastian D'Souza

Personal details
- Born: 5 June 1933 Kusumdegi, British India
- Died: 11 November 2022 (aged 89) Rourkela, Odisha, India

Alphonse Bilung (5 June 1933 – 11 November 2022) was an Indian Roman Catholic prelate. Bilung was born in India and ordinated to the priesthood in 1961. He served as the Bishop of Roman Catholic Diocese of Rourkela from 1979 to until his retirement in 2009.

Catholic Church titles
| Preceded by Post created | Bishop of Rourkela; 1979–2009 | Succeeded by John Barwa |
