= Tenzin Pelsang =

Tibetan Buddhist monk (1965–2022)

- Born: 1965; Luhuo County, China
- Died: November 2022 (aged 56–57)
- Education: Drepung Monastery
- Occupation: Buddhist monk

Tenzin Pelsang (1965 – November 2022) was a Tibetan Buddhist Geshe and monk who led the Dranggo Monastery. A political prisoner arrested in 2012 and freed in 2018, he died from injuries sustained in prison in November 2022.

== Biography ==
According to the Tibetan Centre for Human Rights and Democracy, Tenzin was born in the village of Norpa in Luhuo County in 1965. After learning Tibetan and Mandarin in primary school, he became a monk and studied Tibetan Buddhism. In 1986, he joined the Drepung Monastery, located at the foot of Mount Gephel. After graduating as a Geshe in 2009, he returned to Tibet and joined the Dranggo Monastery.

Two months after the January 2012 protests in Luhuo County, Chinese police with the Ministry of Public Security arrested Tenzin. He was accused of leading the protests and was held for ten months before being sent to Chengdu. He was in prison from 2012 to 2018 along with two other monks, who were sentenced to six years and five years, respectively.

According to Tibet Watch, Tenzin died from injuries sustained in prison in November 2022. It was said that local authorities interfered with his medical treatment following his release.
