= Paul Blackburn (cricketer) =

English cricketer (1934–2022)

Personal information
- Born: 29 March 1934; Heaton Moor, Lancashire, England
- Died: 6 November 2022 (aged 88); Wales
- Source: Cricinfo, 9 April 2017

Paul Hamer Blackburn (29 March 1934 – 6 November 2022) was an English cricketer. He played one first-class match for Cambridge University Cricket Club in 1954. Blackburn died in Wales on 6 November 2022, at the age of 88.

== See also ==
- List of Cambridge University Cricket Club players
