= Eldon Raynor =

Bermudian cricketer (1933–2022)

Personal information
- Full name: Eldon Winfield Raynor
- Born: 26 April 1933; Bermuda
- Died: 3 November 2022 (aged 89)
- Batting: Right-handed
- Bowling: Right-arm slow

Domestic team information
- Years: Team
- 1971/72: Bermuda

Career statistics
Competition	First-class
Matches	1
Runs scored	34
Batting average	17.00
100s/50s	–/–
Top score	34
Balls bowled	36
Wickets	–
Bowling average	–
5 wickets in innings	–
10 wickets in match	–
Best bowling	–
Catches/stumpings	1/–
- Source: CricketArchive, 13 October 2011

Eldon Raynor (26 April 1933 in Bermuda – 3 November 2022) was a Bermudian cricketer. He was a right-handed batsman and a right-arm slow bowler. He played one first-class match for Bermuda, against New Zealand in 1972. It was the maiden first-class match to be played by the Bermuda cricket team.

Raynor died on 3 November 2022.
