= Antonino Mannino =

Italian politician (1939–2022)

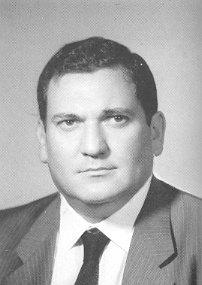

Member of the Chamber of Deputies of Italy
- In office 12 July 1983 – 22 April 1992
- Constituency: Palermo

Personal details
- Born: 7 December 1939 Carini, Italy
- Died: 26 November 2022 (aged 82) Partinico, Italy
- Party: PCI

Antonino Mannino (7 December 1939 – 26 November 2022) was an Italian politician. A member of the Italian Communist Party, he served in the Chamber of Deputies from 1983 to 1992.

Mannino died in Partinico on 26 November 2022, at the age of 82.

== Biography ==
In 1961, he served as provincial secretary of the Italian Communist Youth Federation. A leader of the Sicilian branch of the PCI, he served as secretary of the PCI in Palermo in 1972 and of the provincial federation in 1974. He was elected to the Chamber of Deputies in 1983 as a candidate for the Italian Communist Party in the Palermo-Trapani-Agrigento-Caltanissetta district during the 1983 general election, receiving 33,026 preferential votes. Re-elected in the 1987 general election with 34,321 votes. he remained a member of parliament until 1992. That year, he became provincial secretary of the PDS, a position he held until 1993, when he was elected mayor of Carini. He held that office until December 1997, when he was not re-elected. From 2002 to 2005, he served as president of the “Pio La Torre” (where he had previously worked)
