= John Alderson (cricketer) =

New Zealand cricketer (1929–2022)

Personal information
- Full name: John Dalton Alderson
- Born: 3 February 1929; Glen Innes, Auckland, New Zealand
- Died: 6 November 2022 (aged 93); Karaka, New Zealand
- Batting: Right-handed
- Bowling: Right-arm medium-pace

Domestic team information
- Years: Team
- 1949–50 to 1950–51: Canterbury

Career statistics
Competition	First-class
Matches	7
Runs scored	29
Batting average	4.14
100s/50s	0/0
Top score	7 not out
Balls bowled	830
Wickets	17
Bowling average	24.23
5 wickets in innings	1
10 wickets in match	0
Best bowling	5/66
Catches/stumpings	6/0
- Source: Cricinfo, 2 February 2018

John Dalton Alderson (3 February 1929 – 6 November 2022) was a New Zealand first-class cricketer. He played for Canterbury in the 1949–50 and 1950–51 seasons.

Alderson attended Christchurch Boys' High School, where he broke the school's javelin record in 1947. He then trained as a teacher at Canterbury College in Christchurch.

An opening bowler, Alderson took 5 for 66 in the first innings of his first-class debut against Wellington in 1949–50. He was less successful later, and lost his place in the team after two seasons.

After his cricket career, Alderson ran the family brickyard in Christchurch before moving to Auckland in 1965 and taking up dairying. He died at his farm at Karaka on 6 November 2022, at the age of 93. He and his wife Gloria, who predeceased him, had two sons.
