= Dave Little =

Australian rules footballer (1931–2022)

Personal information
- Full name: Dave Little
- Born: 7 January 1931
- Died: 17 November 2022 (aged 91)
- Original team: Korumburra

Playing career^{1}
Years	Club	Games (Goals)
1953–55	Collingwood	10 (1)
- ^{1} Playing statistics correct to the end of 1955.

Dave Little (7 January 1931 – 17 November 2022) was an Australian rules footballer who played with Collingwood in the Victorian Football League (VFL).
