= José Ruy =

Portuguese comic book author (1930–2022)

- Born: José Ruy Matias Pinto; 9 May 1930; Amadora, Portugal
- Died: 23 November 2022 (aged 92); Amadora, Portugal
- Education: Escola Secundária Artística António Arroio
- Occupation: Comic book author

José Ruy Matias Pinto (9 May 1930 – 23 November 2022) was a Portuguese comic book author. He had been active since the end of the 1940s.

== Works ==
- 1a Exposição portuguesa de histórias aos quadradinhos e ilustração infantil (1952)
- A Lei da Selva (2016)
