= Antônio Soares Dias =

Brazilian lawyer and politician (1945–2022)

Member of the Chamber of Deputies of Brazil
- In office 1983–1990

Member of the Legislative Assembly of Minas Gerais
- In office 1975–1979

Personal details
- Born: 7 September 1945; Montes Claros, Minas Gerais, Brazil
- Died: 29 November 2022 (aged 77); Belo Horizonte, Minas Gerais, Brazil
- Political party: ARENA
- Education: Federal University of Minas Gerais
- Occupation: Lawyer

Antônio Soares Dias (7 June 1945 – 29 November 2022) was a Brazilian lawyer and politician. A member of the National Renewal Alliance, he served in the Chamber of Deputies from 1983 to 1990.

Soares died in Belo Horizonte on 29 November 2022, at the age of 77.
