= Michael Cross (RAF officer) =

British Royal Air Force officer (1942–2022)

- Nickname: Mike
- Born: 1942
- Died: 9 November 2022 (aged 80)
- Allegiance: United Kingdom
- Branch: Royal Air Force
- Rank: Group captain
- Awards: OBE

Group Captain William Michael Cross OBE (1942 – 9 November 2022) was a British Royal Air Force officer who was Chief of Staff of the Air Cadet Organisation. He retired from the post in 2006.

== Trek to the South Pole ==
On 17 January 2003 Mike Cross, aged 60, became the eldest person to travel to the South Pole and, along with his son William Cross, became the first diabetes sufferer to reach the South Pole. Michael and his son William are also the first father and son team to make the journey.

== Personal life and death ==
Cross died on 9 November 2022, at the age of 80.
