= Jacques De Coster =

Belgian teacher and politician (1945–2022)

Member of the Parliament of the Brussels-Capital Region
- In office 19 October 2005 – 7 June 2009
- In office 12 July 1989 – 13 June 1999

Personal details
- Born: 5 January 1945 Etterbeek, Belgium
- Died: 11 November 2022 (aged 77) Woluwe-Saint-Lambert, Belgium
- Party: PS
- Occupation: Teacher

Jacques De Coster (5 January 1945 – 11 November 2022) was a Belgian politician of the Socialist Party. First working as a teacher, he served in the Parliament of the Brussels-Capital Region from 1989 to 1999 and again from 2005 to 2009.

De Coster died in Woluwe-Saint-Lambert on 11 November 2022, at the age of 77.
