= Francisco Laranjo =

Portuguese painter and educator (1955–2022)

Francisco Laranjo (1955 – 15 November 2022) was a Portuguese contemporary painter and educator.

== Work ==
Laranjo was born in 1955 in Lamego, Portugal. He was the director of the School of Arts and associate professor of Porto University and has been lecturer in many universities in cities such as Bilbao, Ottawa, Sheffield, Alexandria, Sofia, Paris and Athens.

As an artist, he has exhibited extensively and in several countries, including Portugal, the Netherlands, Belgium, Germany, Canada, India, United Kingdom, and China.

From his many individual shows, it is possible to highlight the following in Porto (Iter Duriense, Nasoni Gallery, 1993), UK (Simultaneities, Lanchester Gallery, Coventry and The Gallery in Cork Street, London, 1997), Aylmer, Quebec and Toronto, Ontario, Canada (Intimate Land, Chateau Cartier and Camões Institute, 1998), Rio de Janeiro, Brazil (Espelho, Museum of the Republic, 2002), Riga, Latvia (Recent Work, Latvian Academy of Art and Bastejs Gallery, 2002).

Laranjo received several scholarships for post-graduate research, including grants from the Calouste Gulbenkian Foundation (1981–1983), National Scientific Board (Egypt and The Netherlands, 1995), European Committee (1995–1999) and the Goethe Institut, Dresden, Germany.

Laranjo lived and worked in Porto, Portugal. He died from cancer on 16 November 2022, at the age of 67.

== Museums and public collections ==
- JAP, Modern Art Centre, Calouste Gulbenkian Foundation, Lisbon, Portugal
- Institute of Contemporary Arts, Kunsan National University, Republic of Korea
- Ministry of Culture, Porto, Portugal
- Ministry of Finances Collection, Lisbon, Portugal
- Amadeo de Souza-Cardoso Museum, Amarante, Portugal
- Serralves Foundation Museum of Contemporary Art, Porto, Portugal
- MARGS, Museu de Arte de Rio Grande do Sul, Porto Alegre, Brazil
- ASP, Museum Wroclaw, Poland
- Macao Cultural Centre, People's Republic of China
- Teixeira Lopes House Museum, Vila Nova de Gaia, Portugal

== Other institutions where his work is represented ==
- Banco Borges & Irmão
- Banco Comercial de Macau
- Millennium - BCP
- Banco de Fomento Nacional
- Banco de Portugal
- Banco Espírito Santo & Comercial de Lisboa
- Banco Internacional do Funchal
- Banco Português do Atlântico
- Banco Português de Investimento
- Banque Nationale de Paris
- BIC - Banco Internacional de Crédito
- Caixa Geral de Depósitos
- Porto University - School of Arts
- Porto University - School of Humanities
- Cupertino de Miranda Foundation
- Eng^{o} António de Almeida Foundation
- Fundação Oriente
- Porto Polytechnic Institute
- Portugal Telecom

== Sources ==
- http://www.portoturismo.pt/index.php?cron=1&m=1&s=4&tipo=4 (Porto City Hall tourism website)
- http://www.axisart.ca/artists/franciscoLaranjo.php
