= Henry R. McPhee Jr. =

American government official (1925–2022)

Henry Roemer McPhee Jr. (January 11, 1925 – November 12, 2022) was an American government official who was Associate Special Counsel to President Dwight D. Eisenhower.

McPhee was born in Ames, Iowa on January 11, 1925. He was educated at Princeton University. During the Second World War, McPhee served as a naval officer on destroyer escorts in the Pacific. McPhee was appointed as a Special Assistant in the White House in 1954. He became an Assistant Special Counsel to President Dwight D. Eisenhower in 1957, and on November 12, 1958, he was appointed Associate Special Counsel to the President. As a member of the White House Staff, McPhee worked primarily with economic and legal matters, especially in connection with the development of legislative programs. He helped draft, research and coordinate special legislative messages, statements, memoranda, and speeches for the President, particularly those approving or vetoing legislations. He also helped develop, from the legal standpoint, staff studies dealing with such matters as civil aeronautics, conflict of interest cases, executive privilege, and the use of the President's name. McPhee resigned from his position on January 20, 1961.

McPhee died on November 12, 2022, at the age of 97.
