= James Chambaud =

French doctor, sporting director, and politician (1927–2022)

Mayor of Lons
- In office 13 March 1983 – 8 March 2014
- Preceded by: Maurice Baudrit
- Succeeded by: Nicolas Patriarche

Chairman of Pau FC
- In office 1962–1975
- Preceded by: José Bidegain
- Succeeded by: Pierre Clède

Personal details
- Born: 25 May 1927
- Died: 4 November 2022 (aged 95) Pau, France
- Party: RPR; UMP
- Occupation: Doctor; Sporting director

James Chambaud (25 May 1927 – 4 November 2022) was a French doctor, sporting director, and politician. He served as chairman of Pau FC from 1962 to 1975 and was mayor of Lons from 1983 to 2014.

== Biography ==
A gastroenterologist by training, Chambaud interned at a hospital in Bordeaux. He opened his first practice in Pau in August 1955. He then succeeded José Bidegain as chairman of Pau FC, a position he held until 1975.

On 13 March 1983, Chambaud was elected mayor of Lons. As mayor, he was involved in the launch of the Étoiles de Pau, an eventing competition. During his mandate, the population of Lons tripled, with 5000 inhabitants in 1981 and 13,000 in 2014. By the end of his mandate, it had become the second-most populated municipality in Béarn. In 2015, the Espace James Chambaud, a performance hall in Lons, was dedicated to him.

Chambaud died in Pau on 4 November 2022, at the age of 95.
