= Pascal Josèphe =

French businessman (1954–2022)

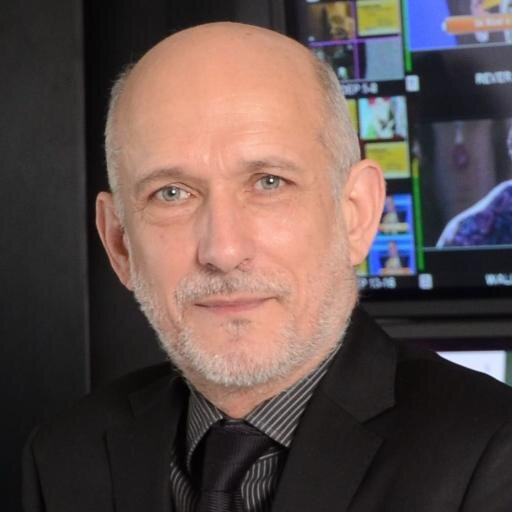
- Josèphe in 2013
- Born: 20 November 1954; Chinon, France
- Died: 20 November 2022 (aged 68)
- Education: Institut d'études politiques de Strasbourg; École supérieure de journalisme de Lille
- Occupation: Businessman

Pascal Josèphe (20 November 1954 – 20 November 2022) was a French television businessman. He directed multiple television channels, including TF1, La Cinq, France 2, and France 3. He was also a member of the diversity board of the Conseil supérieur de l'audiovisuel.

In his later career, Josèphe directed the NGO Media Governance Initiative. In his candidacy for president of France Télévisions, he came in second in the vote to Delphine Ernotte.

Josèphe died on 20 November 2022, his 68th birthday.

== Bibliography ==
- L'Information: communiquer avec les citoyens dans la commune (1983)
- Un amour de télévision : elle n'est plus ce qu'elle était, elle ne sera pas ce que vous croyez (1989)
- La Société immédiate (2008)
