= Antonio Piva =

Italian businessman and politician (1942–2022)

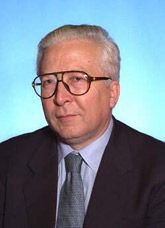

Member of the Chamber of Deputies of Italy
- In office 15 April 1994 – 29 May 2001
- Preceded by: position established
- Succeeded by: Federico Bricolo
- Constituency: Villafranca di Verona

Personal details
- Born: 8 April 1942 Monselice, Italy
- Died: 3 November 2022 (aged 80)
- Party: FI
- Occupation: Businessman

Antonio Piva (8 April 1942 – 3 November 2022) was an Italian businessman and politician. A member of Forza Italia, he served in the Chamber of Deputies from 1994 to 2001.

Piva died on 3 November 2022, at the age of 80.
