= Ted Chiricos =

American criminologist (died 2022)

Ted Chiricos was an American criminologist and the William Julius Wilson Professor of Criminology at Florida State University.

== Early life and education ==
Chiricos received a bachelor in Sociology from Merrimack College in 1963, a masters in sociology from University of Massachusetts Amherst in 1965 and a Ph.D. in sociology from University of Massachusetts Amherst in 1968. Chiricos died of cancer on November 7, 2022.
