= Mimi Kilgore =

American arts patron (1935–2022)

Emilie deMun "Mimi" Smith Kilgore (November 13, 1935 – November 24, 2022) was an American arts patron and heiress. She was the co-founder of the Susan Smith Blackburn Prize.

== Early life and education ==
Emilie deMun Smith was born November 13, 1935, in Houston, Texas. She was one of three children. Her father C. Cabanne Smith was a banker and veteran of World War II (Third Army). Her mother Lucy (Thompson) Smith was an arts patron.

She grew up in the neighborhood of River Oaks. She attended The Kinkaid School and then went on to Smith College, graduating magna cum laude in 1957 after studying in France for a year.

== Career ==
Kilgore moved to New York City after college to work in the art world. She worked as an art librarian at the Frick Collection.

In 1970, she moved back to Houston with her husband and two sons after her father started an oil royalty business in Texas.

During the 1970s, she was the art curator for Fayez Sarofim.

In the summer of 1970, Kilgore met the painter Willem de Kooning at a party. She became his muse and lover. A few weeks after meeting, they went on a public tour of houses in the Hamptons. While they were at one house, Kilgore found a frog that was run over and flattened by a car tire. The shape of the frog reminded her of one of de Kooning’s paintings, so she gave it to de Kooning as a gift. He kept the flattened frog for the rest of his life.

Kilgore’s sister, Susan Smith Blackburn, an actress and writer, died of breast cancer in 1977. Kilgore and the husband of her sister Bill Blackburn, created a prize in her honor that would be given to female playwrights.

== Boards ==
Kilgore served on the boards of the Museum of Fine Arts, Houston and the Contemporary Arts Museum. She was on the board of Guild Hall, in East Hampton, New York. She was the commissioner of the Municipal Arts Committee of the city of Houston.

== Personal life ==
In 1958, Kilgore married William S. Gilbreath III. Together they had a son. They divorced in 1963. In 1965, she married John E. Kilgore Jr. Together they had a son. They divorced in 1985.
