= Pierre de Lagarde =

French historian and television producer (1932–2022)

- Born: 25 March 1932; Meudon, France
- Died: 15 November 2022 (aged 90); Paris, France
- Occupations: Historian; Television producer

Pierre de Lagarde (25 March 1932 – 15 November 2022) was a French historian and television producer and director. He devoted his career to the protection and enhancement of the architectural heritage of France. He produced and directed the show Chefs-d'œuvre en péril, broadcast from 1962 to 1974 and 1976 to 1992.

== Biography ==
At the age of 16, de Lagarde began hitchhiking, visiting churches and castles. This led him to direct and produce Chefs-d'œuvre en péril, first broadcast on Antenne 2 from 1962 to 1974. It quickly became very popular with French audiences. However, the broadcast was halted in 1974 following a dispute with the Minister of Justice. It resumed in 1976 and continued until de Lagarde's retirement in 1992.

From 2001 to 2006, de Lagarde directed Église de France on KTO, which discussed historic religious buildings in France. Throughout his career, he received tens of thousands of letters detailing important, endangered historical buildings in France. An inventory of his work is now held at the Médiathèque du patrimoine et de la photographie. In 1964, he was made a Knight of the Ordre des Arts et des Lettres and in 1990, a Knight of the Legion of Honour. He also served on the board of directors of the Société pour la protection des paysages et de l'esthétique de la France.

De Lagarde died in Paris on 15 November 2022, at the age of 90.

== Publications ==
- Chefs-d'œuvre en péril (1964)
- Guide des chefs-d'œuvre en péril (1967)
- Guide des chefs-d'œuvre en péril : Île-de-France (1969)
- La mémoire des pierres (1980) (Prix Roland-de-Jouvenel)
- Vie et histoire du XVIIIe arrondissement (1996)
- Le Grand duel (1997)
- L'amour dans tous ses états (2001)
- Dictionnaire inattendu des témoins de l'invisible (2009)
- La Pesée des âmes (2012)
- Le Grand cirque : souvenirs romancés (2015)
- Dictionnaire amoureux du patrimoine (2019)
