= Oswald Van Ooteghem =

Belgian politician (1924–2022)

Member of the Flemish Council
- In office 21 October 1980 – 12 December 1987

Member of the Cultural Council for the Dutch Cultural Community
- In office 4 April 1974 – 20 October 1980

Member of the Senate of Belgium
- In office 10 March 1974 – 12 December 1987

Member of the Provincial Council of East Flanders
- In office 1965–1974

Personal details
- Born: 14 August 1924 Ghent, Belgium
- Died: 1 November 2022 (aged 98) Gentbrugge, Belgium
- Party: VU
- Education: Sint-Lucasinstituut

Oswald Van Ooteghem (14 August 1924 – 1 November 2022) was a Belgian politician.

His father, Herman Van Ooteghem, was a military leader in the far-right Vlaamsch Nationaal Verbond which collaborated with Nazi Germany during World War II. Oswald Van Ooteghem himself interrupted his architecture studies in 1941 to join the Flemish Legion, which fought alongside the Waffen-SS on the Eastern Front. After the war, he became a prominent member of the Sint-Maartensfonds, an association that defended the interests of former Nazi collaborators. Van Ooteghem also became a member of the People's Union. In this capacity, he served in the Senate from 1974 to 1987 and in the Flemish Council from 1980 to 1987. In 1977, he was a founding member of the pro-Apartheid "friendship association" Protea.

Van Ooteghem died in Gentbrugge on 1 November 2022, at the age of 98.
