= Tang Youqi =

Chinese physical chemist (1920–2022)

- 唐有祺
- Born: 11 July 1920; Nanhui County, Jiangsu, China
- Died: 8 November 2022 (aged 102); Beijing, China
- Education: Tongji University; California Institute of Technology
- Spouse: Zhang Lizhu
- Scientific career
- Fields: Physical chemistry
- Workplaces: Peking University

Tang Youqi (Chinese: 唐有祺; pinyin: Táng Yǒuqí; 11 July 1920 – 8 November 2022) was a Chinese physical chemist who was a professor at Peking University, and an academician of the Chinese Academy of Sciences.

He was a member of the 6th, 7th and 8th Central Committee of Jiusan Society. He was a member of the 6th National Committee of the Chinese People's Political Consultative Conference and a member of the Standing Committee of the 7th and 8th Chinese People's Political Consultative Conference.

== Biography ==
Tang was born in Nanhui County (now Pudong New Area of Shanghai), Jiangsu, on 11 July 1920, to Tang Zongtai (唐宗泰), a drugstore owner. He attended Xinchang Primary School and Shanghai High School. In 1937, he was accepted to Tongji University, and worked at Kunming Arsenal Phosphorus Plant (昆明兵工厂制磷厂) after graduation. He moved to Chongqing Yuxin Iron and Steel Plant (重庆渝鑫钢铁厂) in January 1943 and co-founded Chongqing Zhongsheng Electrochemical Smelter (重庆钟声电化冶炼厂) in October. He joined the faculty of Tongji University School of Medicine in August 1945. In 1946, he was admitted to California Institute of Technology, studying chemistry under Linus Pauling.

Tang returned to China in September 1951 and that same year became associate professor of the Department of Chemistry, Tsinghua University. In 1952, the Communist government carried out a nationwide readjustment of colleges and universities, the department was merged into Peking University. He was promoted to full professor in December 1963. In 1984, he was chosen as director of the Institute of Physical Chemistry, Peking University, and became director of the Beijing State Key Laboratory of Molecular Dynamic and Steady State Structural Chemistry in 1991.

On 8 November 2022, he died from an illness at Peking University Third Hospital, at the age of 102.

== Personal life ==
In 1952, Tang married Zhang Lizhu (张丽珠), an expert in obstetrics and gynecology, who bore him a son and a daughter.

== Honours and awards ==
- 1980 Member of the Chinese Academy of Sciences (CAS)
- 1996 Science and Technology Progress Award of the Ho Leung Ho Lee Foundation
