= Fernand Zago =

French rugby union player (1942–2022)

- Born: 27 February 1942 Saint-Lys, France
- Died: 8 November 2022 (aged 80) Pertuis, France
- Height: 175 cm (5 ft 9 in)
- Weight: 95 kg (209 lb; 14 st 13 lb)

Rugby union career
- Position: Prop
Senior career
Years	Team	Apps	(Points)
?–?	Sporting club rieumois	?	(?)
?–?	US Montauban	?	(?)
?–?	La Voulte sportif	?	(?)
?–?	Stade union Cavaillon	?	(?)
International career
Years	Team	Apps	(Points)
1963	France	2	(0)

Fernand Zago (27 February 1942 – 8 November 2022) was a French rugby union player who played as a prop. He appeared in two matches for the French national team in the 1963 Five Nations Championship, a 24 to 5 victory over Ireland and a 6 to five loss to England.
