= Nello Sbaiz =

Italian footballer (1941–2022)

Personal information
- Date of birth: 8 May 1941
- Place of birth: Ronchis, Italy
- Date of death: 28 November 2022 (aged 81)
- Height: 1.77 m (5 ft 10 in)
- Position: Defender

Youth career
- 1957–1960: Saint-Étienne

Senior career*
Years	Team	Apps	(Gls)
1960–1967	Saint-Étienne	187	(3)
1967–1972	Lorient	67	(2)
Total		254	(5)

Managerial career
- 1972–1976: Lorient
- * Club domestic league appearances and goals

Nello Sbaiz (8 May 1941 – 28 November 2022) was an Italian football player and manager who played as a defender. He was the brother of Pierre Sbaiz.

== Biography ==
Sbaiz played for AS Saint-Étienne from 1957 to 1967. He then joined FC Lorient. He played 150 matches in Division 1 and 80 matches in Division 2. He played two matches in the European Cup and one match in the UEFA Cup Winners' Cup.

== Honours ==
Saint-Étienne

- French Division 1: 1964, 1967
- French Division 2: 1963
- Coupe de France: 1962
- Challenge of Champions: 1967
