= Shirley Meredeen =

British journalist and activist (1930–2022)

Shirley Lucille Meredeen (née Lewis; 10 June 1930 – 1 November 2022) was a British journalist and activist. She was a founding member of Growing Old Disgracefully.

== Biography ==
Shirley Lucille Meredeen was born in Newington Green, north London, on 10 June 1930. Her parents came to the UK from Russia in 1900 as Refugees. She left school at 17 and worked at the News Chronicle in Fleet Street as a secretary. She did the women's pages in country newspapers and became a chief reporter. She acquired a degree at 41, worked as a student councillor and wrote books.

After retiring, she with Madeleine Levius founded Growing Old Disgracefully.

Meredeen was honoured in BBC'S 100 Women in 2013.

Meredeen died on 1 November 2022, at the age of 92.
