= Tim Gimlette =

Physician (1927–2022)

Thomas Michael Desmond Gimlette (7 January 1927 – 16 November 2022) was a pioneer in the use of radioactive material in medicine.
