= Kristie Macrakis =

American author and professor (1958–2022)

- Born: March 11, 1958; Boston, Massachusetts, U.S.
- Died: November 14, 2022 (aged 64); Atlanta, Georgia, U.S.
- Resting place: Cambridge
- Occupation: Professor

Kristie Irene Macrakis (March 11, 1958 – November 14, 2022) was an American historian of science, author and professor in the School of History, Technology and Society at the Georgia Institute of Technology. She was the author or editor of five books and was widely known for her work at the intersection of history of espionage and history of science and technology.

== Biography ==
Macrakis received her PhD in the history of science at Harvard University. After teaching at Harvard University for a year as a lecturer, Macrakis spent a year in Berlin on an Alexander von Humboldt Foundation Chancellor's Scholar for Future Leaders, before taking up a position at Michigan State University where she advanced from Assistant to Full Professor, before taking up a Full Professor position at Georgia Tech.

Prisoners, Lovers, and Spies (2014) and Seduced by Secrets (2008) were her single authored books. Nigel Jones wrote in The Spectator that Prisoners, Lovers and Spies is "beguilingly informative and sweeping survey of hidden communication." Kirkus Reviews named it one of the best nonfiction books of 2014 and called it "lively...engaging" and "An engrossing study of unseen writing and the picaresque misadventures of those who employ it."

Seduced by Secrets was hailed as the "best book" on the Ministry for State Security by Benjamin Fischer in the International Journal of Intelligence and CounterIntelligence, while Joseph Goulden, of the Washington Times, gave it "a five cloak-and-dagger rating. Good reading for the specialist and the layman alike."

Macrakis was also the author of numerous articles, both scholarly and popular. While a graduate student at Harvard she found that the Rockefeller Foundation funded science in Nazi Germany; that work was covered in the Frankfurter Allgemeine Zeitung, 29 October 1986. Her most widely read popular magazine article is "The Case of Agent Gorbachev," published in American Scientist.

Following a brief illness, Macrakis died on November 14, 2022, at the age of 64.

== Books authored ==
- Surviving the Swastika: Scientific Research in Nazi Germany. New York: Oxford University Press, 1993 ISBN 978-0195070101
- Science under Socialism: East Germany in Comparative Perspective. Cambridge, MA: Harvard University Press, 1999 (with Dieter Hoffmann). ISBN 978-0674794771
- Seduced by Secrets: Inside the Stasi's Spy-Tech World. New York: Cambridge University Press, 2008. ISBN 978-0521887472
- East German Foreign Intelligence: Myth, Reality and Controversy. New York, London: Routledge, 2009 (with Thomas Wegener Friis). ISBN 978-0415664592
- Prisoners, Lovers, and Spies: The Story of Invisible Ink from Herodotus to al-Qaeda. New Haven, London: Yale University Press, 2014. ISBN 978-0300179255
- Espionage. Essential Knowledge Series. Cambridge, London: The MIT Press, 2022. ISBN 9780262545020
- Nothing Is Beyond Our Reach: America's Techno-Spy Empire. United States: Georgetown University Press, 2023. ISBN 9781647123239
