= René Bidouze =

French trade unionist (1922–2022)

Secretary-General of the Finance Federation
- In office 1963–1970

Secretary-General of the Federal Union of State Trade Unions
- In office 1970–1978
- Preceded by: Roger Loube
- Succeeded by: Thérèse Hirszberg

Personal details
- Born: 2 December 1922 Jurançon, France
- Died: 13 November 2022 (aged 99) Paris, France
- Party: PCF
- Education: Enseignement primaire supérieur de Pau
- Occupation: Trade unionist

René Bidouze (2 December 1922 – 13 November 2022) was a French trade unionist. He was director of the civil servants of the General Confederation of Labour (CGT).

== Biography ==
After his studies at the Enseignement primaire supérieur de Pau, he worked as a teacher at the academic inspectorate of Basses-Pyrénées. After his compulsory service with the Chantiers de la jeunesse française, he was incorporated into the Service du travail obligatoire, from which he escaped.

After the Liberation, Bidouze became secretary of the Mouvement Jeunes Communistes de France, which he had joined during the time of the Popular Front and the Spanish Civil War. He then became a member of the federal bureau of the French Communist Party, then served as federal secretary from 1950 to 1952.

Successful in the indirect contributions competition, he made a career in this administration in Pau from 1942 to 1952 and later in Île-de-France. After passing the principal inspector competition, he ended his career as a tax collector Aisne in 1959. He retired from public service in 1981.

From 1958 to 1978, Bidouze held responsibility in the federal offices of the CGT. He was Secretary-General of the Finance Federation. During this time, he was Vice-President of Les Amies et Amis de la Commune de Paris 1871, as well as Vice-President of the Association des juristes démocrates. He became a member of the Institut CGT d'histoire sociale upon its creation in 1982.

René Bidouze died in Paris on 13 November 2022, at the age of 99.
