= Samuel Folsom =

American marine pilot (1920–2022)

Samuel Bruce Folsom (July 24, 1920 – November 12, 2022) was an American marine pilot. He received the Distinguished Flying Cross and a Purple Heart.

The Library of Congress has information on him in its Veterans History Project Collection including a video interview.

He wrote a memoir. He died on November 12, 2022, at the age of 102.
