= Gabriel Camargo Salamanca =

Colombian businessman (1942–2022)

Gabriel Camargo Salamanca (23 May 1942 – 21 November 2022) was a Colombian businessman and sports director who worked in politics as a departmental deputy, municipal councilor and senator of the republic. At the start of the 2020s he was the largest shareholder of Deportes Tolima.

== Life ==
Salamanca was born in Tunja, Boyacá, Colombia, and he married Leonor Serrano (born 1 May 1936), a marriage from which three children were born (Gabriel, Catherine and Caesar Alexander). Gabriel Camargo was known through the company Incubacol and for more than 20 years as a leader of the football professional Colombian.

Salamanca died of cancer in Bogotá on 21 November 2022, at the age of 80.

== Political life ==
Among the public positions he has held are: senator of the Republic of Colombia, deputy of the Departmental Assembly of Cundinamarca between 1994 and 1998, and councilor of Fusagasuga.

For the parliamentary elections of 1998, he joined the Partido Somos Colombia, with which he campaigned to obtain the position of senator of the Republic for the period 1998 to 2002, winning the elections with 39,146 votes where the majority of votes in his favor were obtained in Cundinamarca, Tolima and Boyacá, serving in the Third Commission of the Senate, this as Holder of the Seat.

== Works in Colombian sports ==
Salamanca started in the sport, in his youth, when he practiced athletics, becoming national runner-up in the 100 m. At the University of Tunja he played baseball and soccer as a goalkeeper. Later he was the director of the Athletics League of Boyacá, before having contacts with the Junior of Barranquilla through the then president of that club, Fuad Char.

However, it was the engineer Luis Ernesto Camacho, in the company of Héctor Rivera, who spoke with Gabriel Camargo and Eduardo Robayo to offer them Deportes Tolima. Camargo and Robayo studied the offer and were involved in Colombian soccer since the end of the 1970s.

== Maximum shareholder of Deportes Tolima ==
Since that golden age of Kokoriko Tolima, the businessman and leader has been linked to the red and gold team. However, after the resounding triumphs between 1981 and 1982, he left and withdrew his financial support from the institution until the mid-nineties when he returned to stay and manage the destinies of the "Pijao" cast, even in that stormy 1993, when the tolimense team descended and participated in the Tournament of the First B in 1994.

His friendship with Alfonso Trujillo Ortiz, a businessman from Girardot who lived in Ibagué 55 years ago, led him to offer him the presidency of the club, while he dedicated himself to different trades. His resume and the affection of people from various regions, led Gabriel Camargo Salamanca to reach the Senate of the Republic for two terms, from where he projected his political career. Among his administrative achievements is the achievement of resources for the Manuel Murillo Toro stadium, the meeting of sponsors for the team and the support of different politicians in the region.

Gabriel Camargo Salamanca, as owner of the Tolima institution, led Deportes Tolima to four out of five subtitles and habitual participations in Copa Libertadores and Copa Sudamericana, added to this the most important achievements of the red wine and gold institution in this case its first, second and third title of the national rent in the Torneo Completion 2003 the Apertura Tournament 2018, the Apertura Tournament 2021, in addition to this the title of the Copa Colombia of 2014 and the Superliga de Colombia of 2022.

== Personal distinctions ==
Distinction Cacique Calarcá of the Government of Tolima, Adoptive Son of Ibagué, Adoptive Son of Tolima, declared by the Departmental Assembly, on 19 April 2022. Order of Tolima (1st Class) and Distinction of the Federation National Poultry Farmers.
