= Serhii Khomik =

Ukrainian military pilot

- Native name: Сергій Хомік
- Birth name: Serhii Yaroslavovych Khomik
- Born: 1986 Susval, Volyn Oblast
- Died: 11 November 2022 (aged 35–36) near the village of Berestove, Donetsk Oblast
- Allegiance: Ukraine
- Branch: Ukrainian Air Force
- Rank: Colonel
- Conflicts: Russo-Ukrainian War
- Awards: Order for Courage

Serhii Yaroslavovych Khomik (Ukrainian: Сергій Ярославовик Хомік; 1986, Susval, Volyn Oblast — 11 November 2022, near the village of Berestove, Donetsk Oblast) was a Ukrainian military pilot of the I class, colonel of the 456th Transport Aviation Brigade of the Air Force of the Armed Forces of Ukraine, a participant of the Russian-Ukrainian war.

== Biography ==
In 2008, after graduating from the Ivan Kozhedub National Air Force University, he served as a pilot-navigator of the helicopter search and rescue unit of a helicopter squadron.

He participated in the UN peacekeeping mission in Africa.

During the Russian-Ukrainian war, the officer flew about 1000 combat missions (ATO/JFO — about 800; 2022 — almost 250). Colonel Khomik's crew carried out successful combat missions, and more than 20 pilots mastered combat skills under his leadership.

Commander of a helicopter squadron. On 11 November 2022, two Mi-8s of the Armed Forces of Ukraine took off to destroy the Russian occupiers in Donetsk Oblast. The flight was going on as usual, and the lead helicopter under the command of Colonel Serhii Khomik approached the training area. Then there was a flash. The machine made a sharp maneuver to the left. For a few more seconds, the commander used superhuman efforts to keep the burning helicopter in the air. A few moments later, the lead helicopter "met the ground" near the village of Berestove in Donetsk Oblast. At the cost of his own life, Serhii Khomik saved his comrades.

He was buried on 17 November 2022 in the family village.

He is survived by his parents, wife and two children.

== Awards ==
- Order for Courage, I class (23 December 2022)
- Order for Courage, II class (7 November 2022)
- Order for Courage, III class (2 May 2022)

== Honoring the memory ==
Vinnytsia plans to name a place in honor of Serhii Khomik.
