= Claudius de Cap Blanc =

French sculptor (1953–2022)

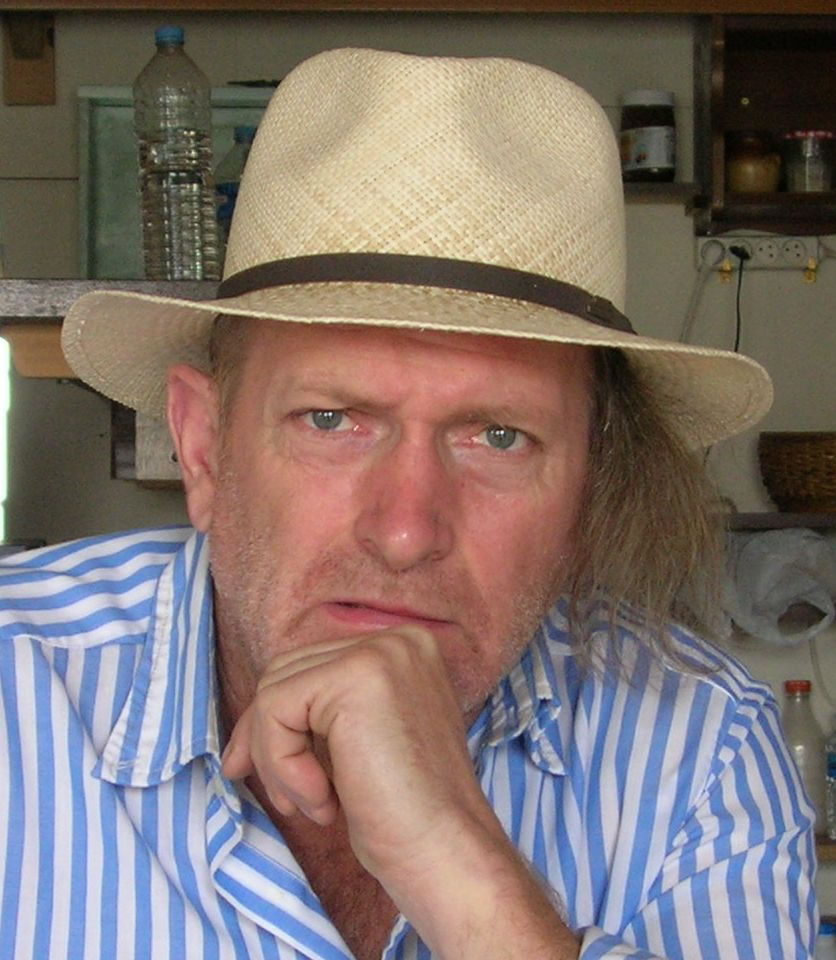
- de Cap Blanc in 2008
- Born: Jean-Claude Lagarde; 1 November 1953; Oust, Ariège, France
- Died: 11 November 2022 (aged 69); Ganac, France
- Occupation: Sculptor

Claudius de Cap Blanc (1 November 1953 – 11 November 2022), pseudonym of Jean-Claude Lagarde, was a French sculptor. He was known as a "vulvographer" for his paintings and engravings of the human vulva.

== Biography ==
Lagarde was born in Oust, Ariège on 1 November 1953 into a peasant family. His name was a replacement for his deceased older brother, also Jean-Claude, after his death at 22 months of age from gangrene. He was found dead on 11 November 2022 in Ganac from a self-inflicted gunshot wound, at the age of 69.

== Works ==
- Art affabulatoire (1994–2006)
- Redresseur de torts
- L'Inverseur de tendance
- Frein à dépense
- Règle de conduite
- Réconciliateur
- Pèse-mot
- Semoir "à tout vent"
- Machine à verser dans le tragique
- L'Auto-aliénateur
- L'Amidonnoir
- Le Sèche-larme
- Le Maïeutiqueur
- La Roue à mouvement perpétuel
- La Machine à joindre les deux bouts

In 2007, Lagarde began devoting himself to vulvography, painting and engraving on the rocks and trees of the Ariège Pyrenees and in public place. The lack of authorization of these works led to his prosecution for vandalism, for which he was fined 6000 euros and sentenced to two months in prison. His sentence was followed by a conference at the Parc pyrénéen de l'art préhistorique put on by prehistorian Jean Clottes.

== Radio ==
In 2012, Lagarde was the subject of the radio documentary Derrière le miroir, Claudius de Cap Blanc, produced by Sophie Bocquillon and broadcast by France Culture.

== Film ==
In 2021, Lagarde was the subject of the documentary À l'aube du vulvolithique, directed by Fabrice Leroy and first shown at the Cinéma Le Casino.

== Television ==
- Éclats de rue (1994)
- TF1 20 heures (1995)
- JT Toulouse Soir (1995)
- Vent Sud Pyrénées (1996)
- Alice Pyrénées France 3 (1998)
- Vent Sud Pyrénées (1998)
- Demain c'est dimanche, Pyrénées (1998)
- Magazine 12-14 (2001)
- JT Toulouse midi 15 minutes, Pyrénées (2003)
- Les dossiers de France 3, Pyrénées (2003)
- JT Toulouse midi, Pyrénées (2005)
- Midi pile Midi Pyrénées (2011)
- JT Toulouse soir, Pyrénées (2011)
- 12-13 édition Midi-Pyrénées (2016)

== Publications ==
- Le Premier Testament des Mangphus (2017)
- La Vulve et ses proscrits (2018)
- L'ère vulvolithique (2018)
- L'Ère Vulvolithique (2018)
- La Somme Vulvographique (2018)
- La Première lettre (2018)
- À la Recherche du Temps Lithique (2018)
- Le Signe de a Vulve (2019)
- Le Vulvificat (2021)
- Vulvoglyphes (2021)
- Gynéçance (2021)
