= Geoff Howells (Australian footballer) =

Australian rules footballer

Personal information
- Full name: Geoffrey Benjamin Howells
- Born: 1 September 1935
- Died: 15 November 2022 (aged 87)
- Height: 183 cm (6 ft 0 in)
- Weight: 83 kg (183 lb)
- Position: Defence

Playing career^{1}
Years	Club	Games (Goals)
1954–60	Hawthorn	59 (27)
1967	Sorrento	17 (unknown)
- ^{1} Playing statistics correct to the end of 1960.

Geoff Howells (1 September 1935 – 15 November 2022) was an Australian rules footballer who played with Hawthorn in the Victorian Football League (VFL).
