= Pyotr Aksyonov =

Russian engineer and politician (1946–2022)

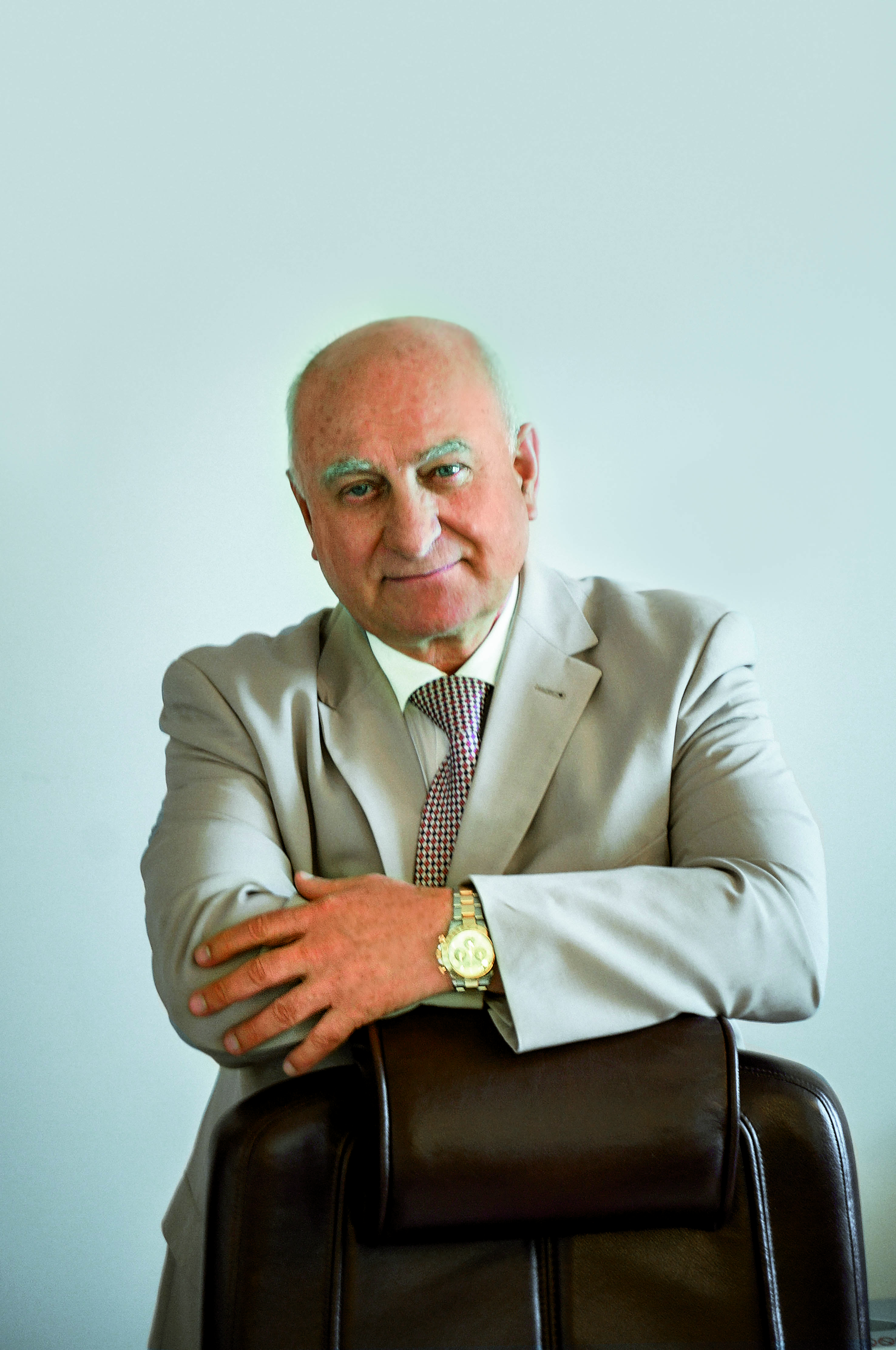
- Aksyonov in 2016

Prefect of the Southern Administrative Okrug
- In office 2000–2002
- Preceded by: Aleksandr Belyaev
- Succeeded by: Pyotr Biryukov

Prefect of the South-Western Administrative Okrug
- In office 1993–2000
- Preceded by: Yuri Prytula
- Succeeded by: Valery Vinogradov

Personal details
- Born: Pyotr Nikolayevich Aksyonov; 25 August 1946 Pavlovskoe, Lebedyansky District, Lipetsk Oblast, Russian SFSR, USSR
- Died: 4 November 2022 (aged 76) Moscow, Russia
- Education: All-Union Correspondence Institute of Civil Engineering
- Occupation: Engineer

Pyotr Nikolayevich Aksyonov (Russian: Пётр Никола́евич Аксёнов; 25 August 1946 – 4 November 2022) was a Russian engineer and politician. He served as a prefect of the South-Western Administrative Okrug from 1993 to 2000 and of the Southern Administrative Okrug from 2000 to 2002.

Aksyonov died on 4 November 2022, aged 76, in Moscow.
