= Dagny Corcoran =

American art book dealer (died 2022)

Dagny Corcoran (1944/1945 – November 9, 2022) was an American art book dealer. She was the curator and owner of the bookstore Art Catalogues, which she opened in the late 1970s in West Hollywood, California. The store was later located in the Museum of Contemporary Art, Los Angeles from 2005 to 2009 and the Los Angeles County Museum of Art from 2010 to 2019. The store is currently located in Culver City.
