= S. William A. Gunn =

Canadian surgeon (1926–2022)

Sisvan William Aram Gunn (February 10, 1926 – November 1, 2022) was a Canadian surgeon, author, involved with various international health organizations.

Sisvan William Aram Gunn was born on February 10, 1926, in Vancouver, British Columbia, Canada. He completed his medical studies in Geneva.

Prior to joining the World Health Organization, Gunn was a lecturer in History of Medicine and Science at the University of British Columbia in Vancouver. Formerly head of Emergency Relief Operations of the WHO. Later, Scientific director vice president of the European Center for Disaster Medicine; founder and president of the Medical Society of the World Health Organization and president of the board of the International Association for Humanitarian Medicine (IAHM).

Gunn authored and co-authored over 300 professional publications and 20 mono-graphs.

Gunn was awarded the honorary doctorate of Palermo University.

Gunn died on November 1, 2022, at the age of 96.
