= Lisa Vollmer =

German politician (1937–2022)

Member of the Landtag of Hesse
- In office 5 April 1985 – 4 April 1999
- Constituency: Party list (1985–1995); Kassel-Stadt II (1995–1999)

Personal details
- Born: Lisa Goßmann; 23 July 1937 Kassel, Germany
- Died: 29 November 2022 (aged 85)
- Party: SPD
- Occupation: Social worker

Lisa Vollmer (née Goßmann; 23 July 1937 – 29 November 2022) was a German social worker and politician. A member of the Social Democratic Party, she served in the Landtag of Hesse from 1985 to 1999.

Vollmer died on 29 November 2022 at the age of 85.
