= Jean Dumesnil =

Canadian academic and cardiologist (1944–2022)

- Born: 1944; Montreal, Quebec, Canada
- Died: 22 November 2022 (aged 77–78); Quebec City, Quebec, Canada
- Education: Université de Montréal
- Occupation(s): Professor; Cardiologist

Jean Dumesnil CQ (1944 – 22 November 2022) was a Canadian academic and cardiologist. He was distinguished by his work on coronary dilations and echocardiography.

== Bibliography ==
- Bon poids, bon cœur avec la méthode Montignac (2002)
- Bon poids, bon cœur au quotidien : de l'épicerie à la table : conseils et recettes (2004)

== Honors ==
- Annual Achievement Award of the Canadian Society of Echocardiography (1999)
- Knight of the National Order of Quebec (2004)
- Honorary fellow of the American Society of Echocardiology (2010)
- Professor emeritus of the Université Laval (2011)
