= Harry Bates (architect) =

American architect (1927–2022)

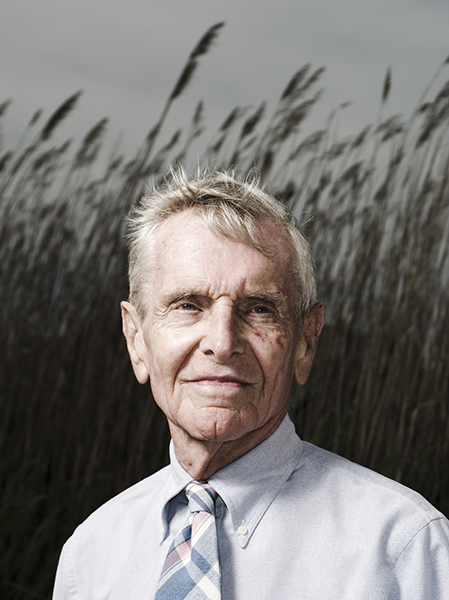
- Architect Harry Bates in 2006

Harry Bates (April 27, 1927 – November 1, 2022) was an American architect. He designed modernist houses on Fire Island and in the Hamptons. Bates was born in Lake City, Florida. He died in Fernandina Beach, Florida.
