= Ernesto Abaterusso =

Italian politician (1956–2022)

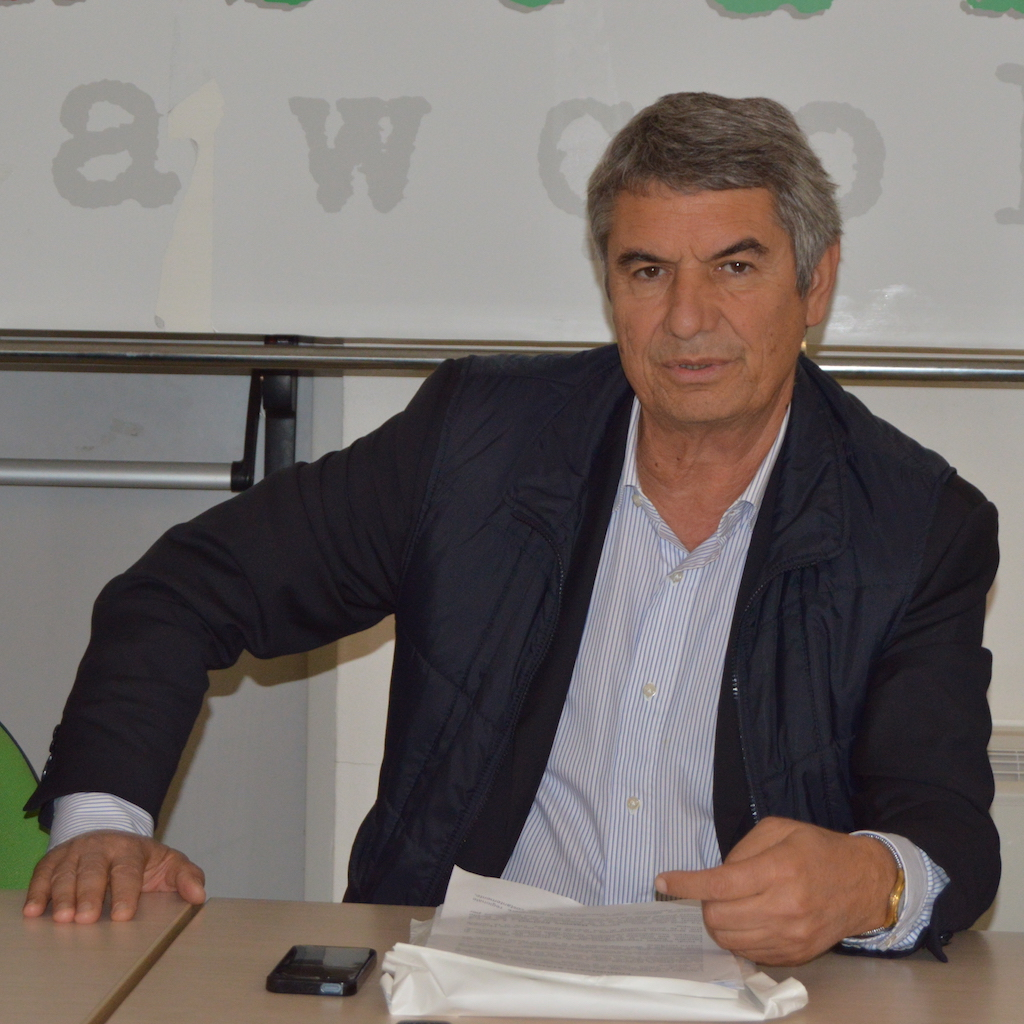
- Abaterusso in 2015

Member of the Chamber of Deputies
- In office 23 April 1992 – 14 April 1994
- Constituency: Lecce
- In office 9 May 1996 – 29 May 2001
- Constituency: Tricase

Personal details
- Born: 18 February 1956 Patù, Italy
- Died: 17 November 2022 (aged 66) Bari, Italy
- Party: PCI (till 1991); PDS (1991–1998); DS (1998–2007); PD (2007–2017); Art1 (2017–2022)
- Education: University of Bologna
- Profession: Agricultural Cooperation Manager

Ernesto Abaterusso (18 February 1956 – 17 November 2022) was an Italian politician. A member of the Democratic Party of the Left, the Democrats of the Left, the Democratic Party, and Article One, he served in the Chamber of Deputies from 1992 to 1994 and again from 1996 to 2001.

Abaterusso died on 17 November 2022, at the age of 66.
