= Sylvie O'Dy =

French journalist and writer (1951–2022)

- Born: 11 January 1951; Chamalières, France
- Died: 21 November 2022 (aged 71); Paris, France
- Education: Centre de formation des journalistes de Paris
- Occupations: Journalist; Writer

Sylvie O'Dy (11 January 1951 – 21 November 2022) was a French journalist and writer. She served as editor-in-chief of L'Express from 1987 to 2001, as well as of Ça m'intéresse and Glifpix. She was also president of the Comité Contre l'Esclavage Moderne from 1999 to 2005.

== Bibliography ==
- L’Etat EDF (1978)
- Esclaves en France (2001)
