= Manuel Hawayek =

Puerto Rican sports shooter (1945–2022)

Personal information
- Born: 17 March 1945 San Juan, Puerto Rico
- Died: 4 November 2022 (aged 77) San Juan, Puerto Rico

Sport
- Sport: Sports shooting

Manuel Hawayek (17 March 1945 – 4 November 2022) was a Puerto Rican former sports shooter. He competed at the 1972, 1976 and the 1984 Summer Olympics.
