= John Noseda =

Swiss politician (1948–2022)

Member of the Grand Council of Ticino
- In office 1979–1999

Personal details
- Born: 18 March 1948 Mendrisio, Switzerland
- Died: 13 November 2022 (aged 74) Lugano, Switzerland
- Party: PPD (until 1978); PS (since 1992)
- Education: University of Geneva
- Occupation: Lawyer

John Noseda (18 March 1948 – 13 November 2022) was a Swiss politician. A member of the Democratic People's Party and later the Swiss Socialist Party, he served in the Grand Council of Ticino from 1979 to 1999.

Noseda died in Lugano on 13 November 2022.
