= Artashes Aznauryan =

Armenian politician (1938–2022)

Minister of Health of the Armenian SSR
- In office 1989–1990
- Preceded by: Emil Gabrielian
- Succeeded by: Mihran Nazaretyan

Personal details
- Born: Artashes Vardani Aznauryan; 19 September 1938 Batumi, Georgian SSR, USSR
- Died: 18 November 2022 (aged 84)
- Party: CPSU
- Education: Yerevan State Medical University
- Occupation: Doctor

Artashes Vardani Aznauryan (Armenian: Արտաշես Վարդանի Ազնաուրյան; 19 September 1938 – 18 November 2022) was an Armenian doctor and politician. A member of the Communist Party of the Soviet Union, he served as Minister of Health of the Armenian SSR from 1989 to 1990.

Aznauryan died on 18 November 2022, at the age of 84.
