= Luis Zingerle =

Italian politician (1933–2022)

Member of the Landtag of South Tyrol
- In office 26 July 1979 – 12 December 1988

Personal details
- Born: Alois Anton Zingerle; 11 August 1933 Schalders, Vahrn, Italy
- Died: 15 November 2022 (aged 89) Raas, Natz-Schabs, Italy
- Party: SVP
- Education: University of Innsbruck
- Occupation: Teacher

Alois Anton Zingerle (11 August 1933 – 15 November 2022) was an Italian politician. A member of the South Tyrolean People's Party, he served in the Landtag of South Tyrol from 1979 to 1988.

Zingerle died in Natz-Schabs on 15 November 2022, at the age of 89.
