= Hédi Balegh =

Tunisian academic and journalist (died 2022)

- Died: 10 November 2022
- Occupations: Professor; Journalist; Translator

Hédi Balegh (Arabic: الهادي البالغ, romanized: al-Hādī al-bāligh; died 10 November 2022) was a Tunisian academic, writer, journalist, television and radio presenter, and translator.

Balegh was an associate professor of French at the Faculty of Letters, Arts and Humanities at Manouba University. In the 1990s, he published Proverbes tunisiens in three volumes. He was credited with translating The Little Prince by Antoine de Saint-Exupéry into Tunisian Arabic.

== Publications ==
- Proverbes tunisiens (Volume 1, 1993)
- Proverbes tunisiens (Volume 2, 1994)
- Proverbes tunisiens (Volume 3, 1998)
- لبيتيت برنسي (The Little Prince, 1997)
