= Jacques Postel =

French academic and psychiatrist (1927–2022)

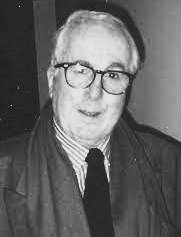
- Born: 1 January 1927
- Died: 25 November 2022 (aged 95)
- Education: University of Lyon; Faculté des lettres de Paris
- Occupations: Professor; Psychiatrist

Jacques Postel (1 January 1927 – 25 November 2022) was a French academic and psychiatrist. He was editor of the magazine L'Évolution psychiatrique from 1984 to 1991.

== Biography ==
Postel was born on 1 January 1927. He earned a doctorate from the University of Lyon in 1955. After his degree, he began working as a neuropsychiatrist at the Sainte-Anne Hospital Center in Paris. He also worked as a professor of clinical psychopathology at Paris Diderot University. In 1983, he published Nouvelle Histoire de la psychiatrie alongside Claude Quétel.

Jacques Postel died on 25 November 2022, at the age of 95.

== Publications ==
- Contribution à l'étude des troubles de la reconnaissance de l'image spéculaire de soi chez les personnes âgées : l'épreuve spéculaire dans les démences tardives (1967)
- L'évolution psychique de l'enfant : intelligence, affectivité, langage (1970)
- Genèse de la psychiatrie : les premiers écrits psychiatriques de Philippe Pinel (1981)
- La Vie et l’œuvre psychiatrique de Frantz Fanon (2007)
- Éléments pour une histoire de la psychiatrie occidentale (2007)
- Trois destins de femmes en asile psychiatrique : Anne-Marie, Madeleine, Suzanne (2014)
