= Han Zhiqing =

Chinese major general (1958–2022)

- 韩志庆

Head of Logistics Support Department of the PLA Ground Force
- In office 2016 – November 2022
- Preceded by: New title

Personal details
- Born: August 1958 Linqing, Shandong, China
- Died: 5 November 2022 (aged 64) China
- Party: Chinese Communist Party
- Education: PLA National Defence University; Military Academy of the General Staff of the Armed Forces of Russia

Military service
- Allegiance: People's Republic of China
- Branch/service: People's Liberation Army Ground Force
- Years of service: 1976–2022
- Rank: Major general
- Unit: 26th Army

Han Zhiqing (simplified Chinese: 韩志庆; traditional Chinese: 韓志慶; pinyin: Hán Zhìqìng; August 1958 – 5 November 2022) was a major general of the People's Liberation Army (PLA) of China and the head of Logistics Support Department of the PLA Ground Force.

== Biography ==
Han was born in Linqing, Shandong, in August 1958. He joined the People's Liberation Army (PLA) in December 1976, and joined the Chinese Communist Party in 1978. He was a graduate student of the PLA National Defence University and the Military Academy of the General Staff of the Armed Forces of Russia.

Han died on 5 November 2022, at the age of 64.

== Career ==
He commanded the Neichangshan Fortress Command in Jinan Military Region from August 2006 to March 2008.

He served as Chief of Staff of 26th Army in April 2008, and held that office until December 2010, when he was promoted to Deputy Army Commander.

In July 2009, by executive Order of the Chairman of the Central Military Commission, he was awarded the military rank of major general.

In March 2013, he was appointed Deputy Chief of Staff of the East Sea Fleet, and served until March 2014. Then he rose to become head of Joint Logistics Department of the Jinan Military Region.

In December 2015, he was appointed head of Logistics Support Department of the PLA Ground Force.

Han was a delegate to the 11th National People's Congress.

== Book ==
- Military Research and Thinking (军事研究与思考)

Military offices
New title	Head of Logistics Support Department of the PLA Ground Force; 2016–2022	Succeeded by TBA
