= Alois Dauenhauer =

German politician (1929–2022)

Member of the Landtag of Rhineland-Palatinate
- In office 1975–1991

Personal details
- Born: 17 July 1929 Rodalben, Bavaria, Germany
- Died: 13 November 2022 (aged 93)
- Party: CDU
- Education: Leibniz-Gymnasium Pirmasens

Alois Dauenhauer (17 July 1929 – 13 November 2022) was a German politician. A member of the Christian Democratic Union, he served in the Landtag of Rhineland-Palatinate from 1975 to 1991.

Dauenhauer died on 13 November 2022, at the age of 93.
