= Stefan Bajohr =

German lecturer and politician (1950–2022)

Member of the Landtag of North Rhine-Westphalia
- In office 1 June 1995 – 1 June 2000

Personal details
- Born: 4 October 1950 Bad Harzburg, Lower Saxony, West Germany
- Died: 21 November 2022 (aged 72)
- Party: Alliance 90/The Greens
- Education: Bielefeld University; University of Zurich; University of Marburg
- Occupation: Lecturer

Stefan Bajohr (4 October 1950 – 21 November 2022) was a German university lecturer, social scientist, and politician. A member of Alliance 90/The Greens, he served in the Landtag of North Rhine-Westphalia from 1995 to 2000.

Bajohr died on 21 November 2022 at the age of 72.
