= Iso Moreira =

Brazilian farmer and politician (1947–2022)

Member of the Legislative Assembly of Goiás
- In office 2001 – 26 May 2022

Personal details
- Born: Aloísio Moreira dos Santos; 21 June 1947; Mambaí, Brazil
- Died: 4 November 2022 (aged 75); Rio de Janeiro, Brazil
- Political party: PSDB
- Occupation: Farmer

Aloísio Moreira dos Santos, known as Iso Moreira, (21 June 1947 – 4 November 2022) was a Brazilian politician. A member of the Brazilian Social Democracy Party, he served in the Legislative Assembly of Goiás from 2001 to 2022.

Moreira died from COVID-19 in Rio de Janeiro, on 4 November 2022, at the age of 75, during the COVID-19 pandemic in Brazil.
