= Thelma Burns =

Thelma D. Burns
- Born: 1936
- Died: November 18, 2022

Thelma D. Burns was a community activist in Boston. She has served as a director of the non-profit, Action for Boston Community Development (ABCD) for 35 years. She has also served as a leader on community boards including the Mayor’s Senior Advisory Council, and the Roxbury YMCA.

Burns was born in Cambridge, MA. Burns received her bachelor's in education from Boston University and a master's in Education Administration from Harvard University. She became a Robert F. Kennedy Fellow in 1968. She served as the METCO director for Belmont Public Schools for 28 years.

In May 2016, the ABCD building in Roxbury was named in her honor. In 2023, she was recognized as one of "Boston’s most admired, beloved, and successful Black Women leaders" by the Black Women Lead project. In 2024, a scholarship fund for high schoolers was named in her honor.
