= Valérie Issarny =

French computer scientist (1964–2022)

Valérie Issarny (19 April 1964 – 12 November 2022) was a Director of Research at the National Institute for Research in Digital Science and Technology (INRIA), France. Issarny was known for her research in middleware solutions for distributed collaborative services, including mobile services deployed over smartphones that interact with sensors.

Issarny's awards include being recognized as one of the “12 Etoiles de l’Europe” (12 Stars of Europe) in 2013, an award given by the French Ministry of Research. In 2014, she was recognised as Chevalier de la Légion d'honneur (Knight of the Legion of Honour) for her contributions to science and European scientific cooperation in research and education.

== Early life and education ==
Issarny got her PhD (Thesis title: Un modèle pour le traitement des exceptions dans les programmes parallèles (A model of exception handling for parallel programs), under the direction of Jean-Pierre Banâtre and "Habilitation à diriger des recherches" (authorization/accreditation to supervise research) in computer science from the University of Rennes I, France, in 1991 and 1997, respectively. In 2007 she gave birth to her only daughter, Lily Issarny.

Issarny died on 12 November 2022.

== Research and career ==
Issarny's research was on middleware solutions facilitating the development of distributed collaborative services, which include mobile services deployed over smartphones and interacting with sensors and actuators.

From 2002 to 2013, Issarny investigated distributed software systems that make use of wirelessly networked devices, with a special focus on service-oriented systems. Then, her research moved towards mobile distributed systems and supporting middleware, the aspects of emergence and evolution, very-large-scale mobile sensing, and mobile social crowd-sensing, and smart cities (e.g. as co-founder of Ambiciti, mobile app for street-level air and noise pollution). She had given keynotes on adaptive middleware and participatory smart cities.

She had led the CityLab@Inria research program dedicated to studying urban software systems promoting citizen engagement. She was involved in the development Appcivist for as an online community collaboration platform for Participatory Budgeting for the City of Vallejo, which received the Berkeley Chancellor's Award for Public Service 2015-16 for Campus-Community collaboration with the City of Vallejo.

Her work on FP7 ICT FET IP CONNECT project has been recognized by the French Ministry of Research. In the CONNECT project, Issarny worked on building “emergent middleware,” that is, the on-the-fly synthesis of the middleware in the form of software mediators that are required for the networked systems to be able to interact.

Issarny was the Editor-in-Chief of ACM Transactions on Autonomous and Adaptive Systems (TAAS), and served as Secretary/Treasurer of the ACM Europe Council. She was the associate editor of IEEE Transactions on Software Engineering, IEEE Transactions on Services Computing, and ACM Transactions on the Internet of Things. From 2007 to 2011, she was associate editor for the software engineering area of the ACM Computing Surveys.

== Awards ==
In 2013, Issarny was recognized as one of the 12 "Etoiles de l’Europe".

Issarny was made Knight of France's Légion d'honneur for her contributions to higher education and research in 2014.

In 2017, Valérie Issarny, Rafael Angarita and Nikolaos Georgantas were awarded a "best paper award" by the IEEE International Conference on Collaboration and Internet Computing for their publication “USNB: Enabling Universal Online Social Interactions".
