= Velta Skurstene =

Latvian actor (1930–2022)

- Born: December 19, 1930; Talsi, Latvia
- Died: November 12, 2022 (aged 91)
- Occupation: Actress

Velta Skurstene (19 December 1930 – 12 November 2022) was a Latvian stage, radio, and film actress. She acted in various Latvian films, including "Kapteiņa Enriko pulkstenis", "Dāvana vientuļai sievietei", "Meldru mežs", "Un rasas lāses rītausmā", "Džimlai Rūdi rallallā!".

Skurstene died on 12 November 2022, at the age of 91.
