= 2022 in literature =

This article contains information about the literary events and publications of 2022.

== Events ==
- 1 January
  - The 2022 New Year Honours List in the UK includes novelist Anthony Horowitz, cookery writer Claudia Roden and publisher Peter Usborne, all of whom receive the CBE.
  - A. A. Milne's Winnie-the-Pooh enters the public domain in the United States.
- 5 January – The Robert B. Silvers Foundation awards the inaugural Robert B. Silvers Prizes to recognize excellence in journalism, literary criticism, and arts writing.
- 11 January – Maya Angelou becomes the first African-American woman to appear on a quarter-dollar coin in the United States.
- 25 January – Colm Tóibín is named the new Laureate for Irish Fiction.
- 22 April – The results of a survey carried out by Mayank Kejriwal and Akarsh Nagaraj at the University of Southern California's Viterbi School of Engineering, using AI, reveal evidence of gender bias in literature.
- 4 May – Ram Nath Kovind becomes the first President of India to address a regional language literary event in the northeast when he attends the closing session of the annual conference of the Bodo Sahitya Sabha in Tamulpur, western Assam.
- 28 May – Biblioteca Gabriel García Márquez in Barcelona, designed by Suma Arquitectura, is formally inaugurated.
- 2 June – British literary figures recognised in the 2022 Birthday Honours include novelists Ian Rankin (knighthood) and Salman Rushdie; the latter is made a Companion of Honour, along with illustrator Sir Quentin Blake.
- 15 June – Opening of Shakespeare North in Prescot in northwest England, incorporating a replica early-17th century playhouse.
- 12 August – Indian-born British-American novelist Salman Rushdie is stabbed multiple times as he is about to give a public lecture at the Chautauqua Institution in Chautauqua, New York, United States.

=== Anniversaries ===
- 200th anniversary of the death of English poet Percy Bysshe Shelley
- 150th anniversary of Publishers Weekly
- 150th Anniversary of Demons by Fyodor Dostoevsky
- 100th anniversary of the Newbery Medal
- 100th anniversary of the birth of poet Philip Larkin
- 100th anniversary of the publication of
  - In a Grove by Ryūnosuke Akutagawa
  - One of Ours by Willa Cather
  - "The Problem of Thor Bridge" by Arthur Conan Doyle
  - The Waste Land by T. S. Eliot
  - The Beautiful and Damned by F. Scott Fitzgerald
  - Tales of the Jazz Age by F. Scott Fitzgerald
    - "The Curious Case of Benjamin Button"
  - Siddhartha by Hermann Hesse
  - Ulysses by James Joyce
  - "A Hunger Artist" by Franz Kafka
  - Aaron's Rod by D. H. Lawrence
  - Babbitt by Sinclair Lewis
  - "Celephaïs" by H. P. Lovecraft
  - "Herbert West–Reanimator" by H. P. Lovecraft
  - "The Music of Erich Zann" by H. P. Lovecraft
  - "The Tomb" by H. P. Lovecraft
  - The Garden Party and Other Stories by Katherine Mansfield
    - "The Garden Party"
  - The Velveteen Rabbit by Margery Williams
  - Jacob's Room by Virginia Woolf

== New books ==
Dates after each title indicate U.S. publication, unless otherwise indicated.

=== Fiction ===
New adult fiction, sorted by date of publication
Author	Title	Date of Pub.	Ref.
Jessamine Chan	The School for Good Mothers	January 4	
Noah Hawley	Anthem	January 4	
Nita Prose	The Maid	January 4	
Jabari Asim	Yonder	January 11	
Diane Chamberlain	The Last House On The Street	January 11	
Hanya Yanagihara	To Paradise	January 11	
May Nikki	Wahala	January 11	
Colleen Hoover	Reminders of Him	January 18	
Sequoia Nagamatsu	How High We Go In the Dark	January 18	
Weike Wang	Joan is Okay	January 18	
Blackburn Lizzie Damilola	Yinka, Where Is Your Huzband?	January 18	
Isabel Allende	Violeta	January 25	
Tochi Onyebuchi	Goliath	January 25	
Marlon James	Moon Witch, Spider King	February 15	
Sheila Heti	Pure Colour	February 15	
Quan Barry	When I'm Gone, Look for Me in the East	February 22	
Lucy Foley	The Paris Apartment	February 22	
Ashley Herring Blake	Delilah Green Doesn't Care	February 22	
Julie Otsuka	The Swimmers	February 22	
Rebecca Serle	One Italian Summer	March 1	
Simone St. James	The Book of Cold Cases	March 1	
Jennifer Egan	The Candy House	April 5	
Bonnie Garmus	Lessons in Chemistry	April 5	
Emily St. John Mandel	Sea of Tranquility	April 5	
Douglas Stuart	Young Mungo	April 5	
Lisa Hsiao Chen	Activities of Daily Living	April 12	
Kimberly Brock	The Lost Book of Eleanor Dare	April 12	
Holly Black	Book of Night	May 3	
Hernan Diaz	Trust	May 3	
Elif Batuman	Either/Or	May 24	
Akwaeke Emezi	You Made a Fool of Death with Your Beauty	May 24	
Nina LaCour	Yerba Buena	May 31	
Lydia Conklin	Rainbow, Rainbow	May 31	
Ottessa Moshfegh	Lapvona	June 21	
Gabrielle Zevin	Tomorrow, and Tomorrow, and Tomorrow	July 5	
Amber Gill	Until I Met You	July 7 (UK)	
Alexis Hall	Husband Material	August 2	
Tess Gunty	The Rabbit Hutch	August 2	
Shehan Karunatilaka	The Seven Moons of Maali Almeida	August 4 (UK)	
R. F. Kuang	Babel, or the Necessity of Violence	August 23	
Suzette Mayr	The Sleeping Car Porter	August 29 (Canada)	
Simon Jimenez	The Spear Cuts Through Water	August 30	
Maggie O'Farrell	The Marriage Proposal	August 31 (UK)	
Gayl Jones	The Birdcatcher	September 13	
Tamsyn Muir	Nona the Ninth	September 13	
Andrew Sean Greer	Less Is Lost	September 20	
Yiyun Li	The Book of Goose	September 20	
Celeste Ng	Our Missing Hearts	October 4	
Colleen Hoover	It Starts with Us	October 18	
George Saunders	Liberation Day: Stories	October 18	
Onyi Nwabineli	Someday, Maybe	November 1	
Tegan Nia Swanson	Things We Found When the Water Went Down	December 6	

=== Children and young adults ===
New children's and young adult fiction, sorted by date of publication
Author	Title	Date of pub.	Ref.
Akshaya Raman	The Ivory Key	January 4	
Jacqueline Woodson	The Year We Learned to Fly	January 4	
Sue Lynn Tan	Daughter of the Moon Goddess	January 11	
Nnedi Okorafor	Akata Woman	January 18	
Eva Chen	I Am Golden	February 1	
Leanne Hall	The Gaps	February 8	
Akwaeke Emezi	Bitter	February 15	
V. E. Schwab	Gallant	March 1	
Sabaa Tahir	All My Rage	March 1	
Deborah Falaye	Blood Scion	March 8	
Kelly Barnhill	The Ogress and the Orphans	March 8	
Casey McQuiston	I Kissed Shara Wheeler	May 3	
Jen Ferguson	The Summer of Bitter and Sweet	May 10	
Laura Kate Dale	Me and My Dysphoria Monster	August 18	
Aaron Reynolds	Creepy Crayon!	August 23	
Mo Willems	The Pigeon Will Ride the Roller Coaster!	September 6	
John Boyne	All the Broken Places	September 15	
Malinda Lo	A Scatter of Light	October 4	
Liz Montague	Maybe an Artist	October 18	
Kim Spencer	Weird Rules to Follow	October 18	
Jeff Kinney	Diary of a Wimpy Kid: Diper Överlöde	October 25	
DeuxMoi & Jessica Goodman	Anon Pls.	November 8	
Ammaar Reshi/ChatGPT	Alice and Sparkle	December 4	

=== Poetry ===
- Ocean Vuong – Time Is a Mother (April 5, US)

=== Nonfiction ===
New nonfiction, sorted by date of publication
Author	Title	Date of pub.	Ref.
Imani Perry	South to America: A Journey Below the Mason Dixon to Understand the Soul of a Nation	January 25	
Daniel H. Pink	The Power of Regret: How Looking Backward Moves Us Forward	February 1	
Chuck Klosterman	The Nineties	February 8	
Andre Henry	All the White Friends I Couldn't Keep	March 22	
Alexandra Lange	Meet Me by the Fountain: An Inside History of the Mall	June 14	
Ed Yong	An Immense World: How Animal Senses Reveal the Hidden Realms Around Us	June 21	
Elizabeth Alexander	The Trayvon Generation	June 28	
Patrick Radden Keefe	Rogues: True Stories of Grifters, Killers, Rebels and Crooks	June 28	
Philip Rosenthal and Jenn Garbee	Somebody Feed Phil the Book	October 18	
Quentin Tarantino	Cinema Speculation	November 1	
Michelle Obama	The Light We Carry: Overcoming in Uncertain Times	November 15	
Oskar Lafontaine	Ami, it's time to go! Plädoyer für die Selbstbehauptung Europas	November 21	
Leila Philip	Beaverland	December 6	
Jessica Grose	Screaming on the Inside	December 6	

=== Biography and memoirs ===
New biographies and memoirs, sorted by date of publication
Author	Title	Date of pub.	Ref.
Bernardine Evaristo	Manifesto: On Never Giving Up	January 18	
Laura Gao	Messy Roots: A Graphic Memoir of a Wuhanese-American	March 8	
Elena Ferrante	In the Margins: On the Pleasures of Reading and Writing	March 15	
Maud Newton	Ancestor Trouble: A Reckoning and a Reconciliation	March 29	
Hannah Gadsby	Ten Steps to Nanette	March 29 (Australia)	
Delia Ephron	Left on Tenth: A Second Chance at Life	April 12	
Janelle Monáe	The Memory Librarian	April 19	
Viola Davis	Finding Me	April 26	
Jennette McCurdy	I'm Glad My Mom Died	August 9	
Yasmín Ramírez	¡Ándale, Prieta! A Love Letter to My Family	August 2	

== Films ==
- Matilda the Musical

== Deaths ==
2022 deaths, sorted by date of death
Individual	Background	Date of death	Age	Cause of death	Ref.
Zheng Min	Chinese poet	January 3	101		
F. Sionil José	Filipino novelist and journalist	January 6	97		
Terry Teachout	American author, critic, biographer, playwright, stage director, and librettist	January 13	65		
Ron Goulart	American author of Groucho Marx mysteries	January 14	89	Respiratory arrest	
Thiago de Mello	Brazilian poet and translator	January 14	95		
André Leon Talley	American fashion author, editor, and journalist	January 18	73	Complications of a heart attack and COVID-19	
Lani Forbes	American young adult novelist`	February 3	35	Neuroendocrine cancer	
Ashley Bryan	American writer and illustrator of children's books	February 4	98		
Jason Epstein	American editor and publisher	February 4	93	Congestive heart failure	
Kenta Nishimura	Japanese novelist	February 5	54		
Bruce Duffy	American novelist	February 10	70	Brain cancer	
P. J. O'Rourke	American political satirist and journalist	February 15	74	Lung cancer	
Jan Pieńkowski	Polish-born English writer and illustrator of children's books (Meg and Mog)	February 19	85	Complications of dementia	
Shirley Hughes	English writer and illustrator of children's books	February 25	94		
Nelson W. Aldrich Jr.	American author, editor, and journalist	March 8	86	Complications from Parkinson's disease	
Maureen Howard	American novelist, memoirist, and editor	March 13	91		
Yuz Aleshkovsky	Russian-American writer, poet, and singer-songwriter	March 21	92		(in Russian)
Ted Mooney	American novelist and journalist (Art in America)	March 22	70	Heart disease	
Richard Howard	American poet, critic, and translator	March 31	92		
David McKee	English writer and illustrator of children's books (Elmer the Patchwork Elephant, Not Now, Bernard)	April 6	87		
Jack Higgins	British crime writer	April 9	92		
Serhiy Dyachenko	Ukrainian fantasy novelist	May 5	77		
Patricia A. McKillip	American fantasy novelist (The Forgotten Beasts of Eld)	May 6	74		
Kim Chi-ha	South Korean poet and playwright	May 8	81		
Peter Lamborn Wilson	American anarchist author and poet (Temporary Autonomous Zone)	May 22	76-77		
Morton L. Janklow	American literary agent	May 25	91		
Walter Abish	Austrian-born American author of experimental novels and short stories	May 28	90		
Boris Pahor	Slovenian writer (Necropolis)	May 30	108		
George Lamming	Barbadian novelist (In the Castle of My Skin) and poet	June 4	94		
Duncan Hannah	American visual artist and author	June 11	69	Heart attack	
A. B. Yehoshua	Israeli novelist, essayist, and playwright	June 14	85	Cancer	
Raffaele La Capria	Italian writer and screenwriter (Hands over the City, Many Wars Ago)	June 26	99		
Frank Moorhouse	Australian novelist and screenwriter	June 26	83		
Susie Steiner	British crime novelist	July 2	51	Brain cancer	
Joan Lingard	Scottish author (The Kevin and Sadie series)	July 12	90		
Stuart Woods	American novelist (Chiefs)	July 22	84		
Melissa Bank	American author (The Girls' Guide to Hunting and Fishing)	August 2	61	Lung cancer	
David McCullough	American author. Historian, and biographer (Truman, John Adams)	August 7	89		
Raymond Briggs	English author, illustrator, cartoonist and graphic novelist (The Snowman, Father Christmas, Fungus the Bogeyman)	August 9	88	Pneumonia	
Nicholas Evans	English journalist, novelist (The Horse Whisperer), and screenwriter	August 9	72	Heart attack	
Jean-Jacques Sempé	French cartoonist (Le Petit Nicolas)	August 11	89		
Frederick Buechner	American novelist (A Long Day's Dying (1950), Godric (1980)), memoirist (The Sacred Journey (1982), Now and Then (1982)), essayist, poet, theologian, and preacher	August 15	96		
Joseph Delaney	English author (Spook's)	August 16	77		
Hadrawi	Somali poet	August 18	78-79		
Michael Malone	American writer	August 19	80	Pancreatic cancer	
Peter Straub	American writer (Julia, Ghost Story, and The Talisman)	September 4	79		
Mariella Mehr	Swiss novelist, playwright and poet	September 5	74		
Javier Marías	Spanish novelist (A Heart So White and Tomorrow in the Battle Think on Me)	September 11	70	Pneumonia	
Yadollah Royaee	Iranian poet	September 14	90		
Tibor Frank	Hungarian historian	September 15	74		
Saul Kripke	American philosopher and logician	September 15	81		
Hilary Mantel	British novelist (Wolf Hall)	September 22	70		
Knud Sørensen	Danish novelist, essayist and poet	September 26	94		
Marguerite Andersen	German-born Canadian writer, poet and translator	October 1	97		
Charles Fuller	American playwright (A Soldier's Play, Zooman and the Sign)	October 3	83		
Rebecca Godfrey	Canadian author	October 3	54	Lung cancer	
David Huerta	Mexican poet	October 3	72		
Peter Robinson	British-born Canadian crime writer	October 4	72		
Temsüla Ao	Indian poet and writer (Laburnum For My Head)	October 9	76		
Bruno Latour	French philosopher and sociologist (Laboratory Life, Science in Action, We Have Never Been Modern)	October 9	75	Pancreatic cancer	
Thomas Cahill	American scholar and writer (How the Irish Saved Civilization)	October 18	82		
John Jay Osborn Jr.	American writer (The Paper Chase)	October 19	77	Squamous cell cancer	
Anton Donchev	Bulgarian novelist (Time of Parting) and screenwriter	October 20	92		
Leszek Engelking	Polish writer and translator	October 22	67		
Mike Davis	American writer, political activist, urban theorist, and historian (City of Quartz, Late Victorian Holocausts, Set the Night on Fire)	October 25	76	Cancer	
Julie Powell	American author (Julie & Julia)	October 25	49	Cardiac arrest	
Gerald Stern	American poet, essayist, and educator	October 27	97		
Bahaa Taher	Egyptian novelist and short story writer	October 27	87		
Hava Pinhas-Cohen	Israeli writer and poet	October 29	67		
Gael Greene	American author	November 1	88		
Doris Grumbach	American novelist, memoirist, biographer, literary critic, and essayist	November 4	104		
Geoff Cochrane	New Zealand poet, novelist and short story writer	November 14	71		
Marcus Sedgwick	British writer, illustrator and musician	November 15	54		
Joëlle Guillais	French writer	November 19	70	Stroke	
Marijane Meaker	American writer (Spring Fire)	November 21	95	Cardiac arrest	
Bernadette Mayer	American poet and writer	November 22	77		
Milovan Danojlić	Serbian poet, essayist and literary critic	November 23	85		
Christian Bobin	French author and poet	November 24	71		
Hans Magnus Enzensberger	German author, poet, translator, and editor (Der Untergang der Titanic, The Number Devil)	November 24	93		
Abdulaziz Al-Maqaleh	Yemeni poet and essayist	November 28	85		
Ray Nelson	American science fiction writer (The Ganymede Takeover, The Prometheus Man)	November 30	91		
Dominique Lapierre	French author	December 4	91		
Claude Mossé	French historian	December 12	97		
Manfred Messerschmidt	German historian (Germany and the Second World War)	December 18	96		
Xi Xi	Chinese novelist and poet	December 18	85	Heart failure	
Françoise Bourdin	French novelist	December 25	70		
Begoña Huertas	Spanish writer	December 25	57		
Vijayasarathi Sribhashyam	Indian writer, Sanskrit grammarian, and literary critic	December 28	86		
Marion Meade	American biographer and novelist	December 29	88		

== Awards ==
=== Adult ===
2022 literature awards, ordered alphabetically by award
Award	Category	Date awarded	Recipient(s)	Work	Date Published	Ref.
America Award in Literature			Gerhard Rühm	—	—	
American Academy of Arts and Letters	Arts and Letters Awards in Literature	May	Catherine Barnett	—	—	
American Academy of Arts and Letters	Arts and Letters Awards in Literature	May	Jo Ann Beard	—	—	
American Academy of Arts and Letters	Arts and Letters Awards in Literature	May	Aleshea Harris	—	—	
American Academy of Arts and Letters	Arts and Letters Awards in Literature	May	Sarah Manguso	—	—	
American Academy of Arts and Letters	Arts and Letters Awards in Literature	May	Joyelle McSweeney	—	—	
American Academy of Arts and Letters	Arts and Letters Awards in Literature	May	Susan Brind Morrow	—	—	
American Academy of Arts and Letters	Arts and Letters Awards in Literature	May	Doug Peacock	—	—	
American Academy of Arts and Letters	Arts and Letters Awards in Literature	May	Adrian Nathan West	—	—	
American Academy of Arts and Letters	Benjamin Hadley Danks Award	May	Martyna Majok	—	—	
American Academy of Arts and Letters	Harold D. Vursell Memorial Award	May	Joshua Cohen	The Netanyahus		
American Academy of Arts and Letters	Katherine Anne Porter Award	May	Lynne Tillman	—	—	
American Academy of Arts and Letters	Morton Dauwen Zabel Award	May	Patricia Lockwood	Priestdaddy		
American Academy of Arts and Letters	Award of Merit for Poetry	May	Stephen Dobyns	—	—	
American Academy of Arts and Letters	Rosenthal Family Foundation Award	May	Kirstin Valdez Quade	The Five Wounds		
American Academy of Arts and Letters	Sue Kaufman Prize for First Fiction	May	Jackie Polzin	Brood		
American Academy of Arts and Letters	Thornton Wilder Prize for Translation	May	Edith Grossman	Love in the Time of Cholera		
Andre Norton Award		May 21	Darcie Little Badger	A Snake Falls to Earth		
Baillie Gifford Prize		Nov 17	Katherine Rundell	Super-Infinite: The Transformations of John Donne		
BBC National Short Story Award			Saba Sams	"Blue 4eva"		
Booker Prize	Booker Prize	Oct 17	Shehan Karunatilaka	The Seven Moons of Maali Almeida		
Booker Prize	International Booker Prize	May	Geetanjali Shree with Daisy Rockwell (trans.)	Tomb of Sand		
Bookseller/Diagram Prize for Oddest Title of the Year		Dec 9	Lindsay Bryde and Tommy Mayberry	RuPedagogies of Realness: Essays on Teaching and Learning With RuPaul's Drag Race		
Bram Stoker Award	Best Novel (Horror)	TBA	TBA	TBA		
British Book Awards	Author of the Year	May 23	Marian Keyes	—	—	
British Book Awards	Book of the Year	May 23	Marcus Rashford with Carl Anka	You Are a Champion: How To Be the Best You Can Be		
British Book Awards	Fiction Book	May 23	Meg Mason	Sorrow and Bliss		
British Book Awards	Début Book	May 23	Caleb Azumah Nelson	Open Water		
British Book Awards	Crime & Thriller	May 23	William McIlvanney, Ian Rankin	The Dark Remains		
Caine Prize for African Writing		Jul 18	Idza Luhumyo	"Five Years Next Sunday"		
Carnegie Medal		~Jun 15	Katya Balen	October, October		
Center for Fiction First Novel Prize		Dec 6	Noor Naga	If an Egyptian Cannot Speak English		
Duff Cooper Prize		March 2023	Anna Keay	The Restless Republic		
Edgar Awards	Novel	Apr 28	James Kestrel	Five Decembers		
Edgar Awards	Raven Award	Apr 28	Lesa Holstine	—	—	
Edgar Awards	Ellery Queen Award	Apr 28	Juliet Grames	—	—	
Edgar Awards	Mystery Writers of America's Grand Master	Apr 28	Laurie R. King	—	—	
Eugie Award		Sep 4	Sarah Pinsker	"Where Oaken Hearts Do Gather"		
European Book Prize	Novel		Antonio Scurati	M. L'uomo della provvidenza		
Folio Prize			Colm Tóibín	The Magician		
Franz Kafka Prize		TBA	TBA	TBA		
Giller Prize		Nov 7	Suzette Mayr	The Sleeping Car Porter	August 29	
Governor General's Awards	English Fiction	November 16	Sheila Heti	Pure Colour		
Governor General's Awards	English Non-Fiction	November 16	Eli Baxter	Aki-wayn-zih: A Person as Worthy as the Earth		
Governor General's Awards	English Poetry	November 16	Annick MacAskill	Shadow Blight		
Governor General's Awards	English Drama	November 16	Dorothy Dittrich	The Piano Teacher: A Healing Key		
Governor General's Awards	English Children's Literature	November 16	Jen Ferguson	The Summer of Bitter and Sweet		
Governor General's Awards	English Children's Illustration	November 16	Naseem Hrab and Nahid Kazemi	The Sour Cherry Tree		
Governor General's Awards	French to English Translation	November 16	Judith Weisz Woodsworth	History of the Jews in Quebec		
Governor General's Awards	French Fiction	November 16	Alain Farah	Mille secrets mille dangers		
Governor General's Awards	French Non-Fiction	November 16	Sylveline Bourion	La Voie romaine		
Governor General's Awards	French Poetry	November 16	Maya Cousineau Mollen	Enfants du lichen		
Governor General's Awards	French Drama	November 16	David Paquet	Le poids des fourmis		
Governor General's Awards	French Children's literature	November 16	Julie Champagne	Cancer ascendant Autruche		
Governor General's Awards	French Children's illustration	November 16	Nadine Robert and Qin Leng	Trèfle		
Governor General's Awards	English to French translation	November 16	Mélissa Verreault	Partie de chasse au petit gibier entre lâches au club de tir du coin		
Hugo Award	Best Novel	Sep 24	Arkady Martine	A Desolation Called Peace		
Hugo Award	Best Novella	Sep 24	Becky Chambers	A Psalm for the Wild-Built		
Hugo Award	Best Novelette	Sep 24	Suzanne Palmer	"Bots of the Lost Ark"		
Hugo Award	Best Short Story	Sep 24	Sarah Pinsker	"Where Oaken Hearts Do Gather"		
Hugo Award	Lodestar Award	Sep 24	Naomi Novik	The Last Graduate		
Hugo Award	Astounding Award	Sep 24	Shelley Parker-Chan	She Who Became the Sun		
International Dublin Literary Award			Alice Zeniter (translated by Frank Wynne)	The Art of Losing		
International Thriller Writer Award	Audiobook	Jun 5	S. A. Cosby with Adam Lazarre-White (narrator)	Razorblade Tears		
International Thriller Writer Award	E-Book Original Novel	Jun 5	E. J. Findorff	Blood Parish		
International Thriller Writer Award	First Novel	Jun 5	Amanda Jayatissa	My Sweet Girl		
International Thriller Writer Award	Hardcover Novel	Jun 5	S. A. Cosby	Razorblade Tears		
International Thriller Writer Award	Paperback Original Novel	Jun 5	Amanda Jayatissa	Bloodline		
International Thriller Writer Award	Short Story	Jun 5	Scott Loring Sanders	"The Lemonade Stand"		
International Thriller Writer Award	Young Adult Novel	Jun 5	Courtney Summers	The Project		
International Thriller Writer Award	ThrillMaster	Jun 5	Frederick Forsyth	—	—	
International Thriller Writer Award	ThrillMaster	Jun 5	Diana Gabaldon	—	—	
Lambda Literary Award	Anthology	Jun 13	Briona Simone Jones	Mouths of Rain: An Anthology of Black Lesbian Thought		
Lambda Literary Award	Bisexual Fiction	Jun 13	Alix Ohlin	We Want What We Want		
Lambda Literary Award	Bisexual Nonfiction	Jun 13	Aisha Sabatini Sloan	Borealis		
Lambda Literary Award	Bisexual Poetry	Jun 13	Aurielle Marie	Gumbo Ya Ya		
Lambda Literary Award	Children's	Jun 13	JR Ford and Vanessa Ford	Calvin		
Lambda Literary Award	Drama	Jun 13	R. Eric Thomas	Mrs. Harrison		
Lambda Literary Award	Erotica	Jun 13	Samuel R. Delany	Big Joe		
Lambda Literary Award	Gay Fiction	Jun 13	Brontez Purnell	100 Boyfriends		
Lambda Literary Award	Gay Memoir or Biography	Jun 13	Brian Broome	Punch Me Up to the Gods: A Memoir		
Lambda Literary Award	Gay Poetry	Jun 13	John Keene	Punks: New & Selected Poems		
Lambda Literary Award	Gay Romance	Jun 13	Larry Benjamin	Excellent Sons: A Love Story in Three Acts		
Lambda Literary Award	Graphic Novel	Jun 13	Lee Lai	Stone Fruit		
Lambda Literary Award	Lesbian Fiction	Jun 13	Mia McKenzie	Skye Falling		
Lambda Literary Award	Lesbian Memoir or Biography	Jun 13	Sophie Santos	The One You Want to Marry (And Other Identities I've Had)		
Lambda Literary Award	Lesbian Poetry	Jun 13	Tamiko Beyer	Last Days		
Lambda Literary Award	Lesbian Romance	Jun 13	Milena McKay	The Headmistress		
Lambda Literary Award	LGBTQ Studies	Jun 13	Anna Lvovsky	Vice Patrol: Cops, Courts, and the Struggle over Urban Gay Life before Stonewall		
Lambda Literary Award	Mystery	Jun 13	John Copenhaver	The Savage Kind		
Lambda Literary Award	Nonfiction	Jun 13	Sarah Schulman	Let the Record Show: A Political History of ACT UP New York, 1987–1993		
Lambda Literary Award	Speculative Fiction	Jun 13	Cadwell Turnbull	No Gods, No Monsters		
Lambda Literary Award	Transgender Fiction	Jun 13	Jeanne Thornton	Summer Fun		
Lambda Literary Award	Transgender Nonfiction	Jun 13	Da’Shaun Harrison	Belly of the Beast: The Politics of Anti-Fatness as Anti-Blackness		
Lambda Literary Award	Transgender Poetry	Jun 13	Mason J	Crossbones on My Life		
Lambda Literary Award	Young Adult	Jun 13	A. R. Capetta	The Heartbreak Bakery		
Miguel de Cervantes Prize			Rafael Cadenas	—	—	
Miles Franklin Award			Jennifer Down	Bodies of Light		
Nobel Prize in Literature		Oct 6	Annie Ernaux	—	—	
Premio Planeta de Novela		Oct 16	Luz Gabás	Lejos de Luisiana	November 4	
Premio Strega Prize			Mario Desiati	Spatriati		
Prix Goncourt		Nov 3	Brigitte Giraud	Vivre vite	August 24	
Publishing Triangle	Audre Lorde Award for Lesbian Poetry	May 11	Cheryl Boyce Taylor	Mama Phife Represents		
Publishing Triangle	Edmund White Award for Debut Fiction	May 11	Robert Jones Jr.	The Prophets		
Publishing Triangle	Ferro-Grumley Award for LGBTQ Fiction	May 11	Anthony Veasna So	Afterparties		
Publishing Triangle	Judy Grahn Award for Lesbian Nonfiction	May 11	Briona Simone Jones	Mouths of Rain: An Anthology of Black Lesbian Thought		
Publishing Triangle	Publishing Triangle Award for Trans and Gender-Variant Literature	May 11	Ari Banias	A Symmetry		
Publishing Triangle	Randy Shilts Award for Gay Nonfiction	May 11	Brian Broome	Punch Me Up to the Gods: A Memoir		
Publishing Triangle	Thom Gunn Award for Gay Poetry	May 11	John Keene	Punks: New & Selected Poems		
Pulitzer Prize	Pulitzer Prize for Fiction		Joshua Cohen	The Netanyahus		
Pulitzer Prize	Pulitzer Prize for Drama		James Ijames	Fat Ham		
Pulitzer Prize	Pulitzer Prize for Nonfiction		Andrea Elliott	Invisible Child: Poverty, Survival & Hope in an American City		
Pulitzer Prize	Pulitzer Prize for History		Nicole Eustace	Covered with Night		
Pulitzer Prize	Pulitzer Prize for History		Ada Ferrer	Cuba: An American History		
Pulitzer Prize	Pulitzer Prize for Biography		Winfred Rembert	Chasing Me to My Grave		
Pulitzer Prize	Pulitzer Prize for Biography		Erin I. Kelly	Chasing Me to My Grave		
ReLit Awards	Novel	May 20	Conor Kerr	Avenue of Champions		
ReLit Awards	Short fiction	May 20	Sydney Hegele	The Pump		
ReLit Awards	Poetry	May 20	Charlie Petch	Why I Was Late		
Silvers-Dudley Prize	Robert B. Silvers Prize for Literary Criticism	Jan 5	Elaine Blair	—	—	
Silvers-Dudley Prize	Robert B. Silvers Prize for Literary Criticism	Jan 5	Merve Emre	—	—	
Silvers-Dudley Prize	Robert B. Silvers Prize for Literary Criticism	Jan 5	Becca Rothfeld	—	—	
Silvers-Dudley Prize	Robert B. Silvers Prize for Journalism	Jan 5	Alma Guillermoprieto	—	—	
Silvers-Dudley Prize	Robert B. Silvers Prize for Journalism	Jan 5	Nesrine Malik	—	—	
Silvers-Dudley Prize	Robert B. Silvers Prize for Journalism	Jan 5	Thomas Meaney	—	—	
Silvers-Dudley Prize	Grace Dudley Prize for Arts Writing	Jan 5	Vinson Cunningham	—	—	
Silvers-Dudley Prize	Grace Dudley Prize for Arts Writing	Jan 5	Jason Farago	—	—	
Silvers-Dudley Prize	Grace Dudley Prize for Arts Writing	Jan 5	Ingrid Rowland	—	—	
Trillium Book Award	English Prose	Jun 21	Ann Shin	The Last Exiles		
Trillium Book Award	English Poetry	Jun 21	Bardia Sinaee	Intruder		
Trillium Book Award	French Prose	Jun 21	Robert Marinier	Un conte de l’apocalypse		
Trillium Book Award	French Poetry	Jun 21	Chloé LaDuchesse	Exosquelette		
Women's Prize for Fiction		Jun 15	Ruth Ozeki	The Book of Form and Emptiness		
Writers' Trust of Canada	Shaughnessy Cohen Prize for Political Writing	May 2	Joanna Chiu	China Unbound: A New World Disorder		
Writers' Trust of Canada	RBC Bronwen Wallace Award for Emerging Writers	June 6	Teya Hollier	"Watching, Waiting"	—	
Writers' Trust of Canada	RBC Bronwen Wallace Award for Emerging Writers	June 6	Patrick James Errington	"If Fire, Then Bird"	—	
Writers' Trust of Canada	Atwood Gibson Writers' Trust Fiction Prize	Nov 2	Nicholas Herring	Some Hellish		
Writers' Trust of Canada	Dayne Ogilvie Prize	Nov 2	Francesca Ekwuyasi	Butter Honey Pig Bread		
Writers' Trust of Canada	Hilary Weston Writers' Trust Prize for Nonfiction	Nov 2	Dan Werb	The Invisible Siege: The Rise of Coronaviruses and the Search for a Cure		
Writers' Trust of Canada	Latner Writers' Trust Poetry Prize	Nov 2	Joseph Dandurand		—	
Writers' Trust of Canada	Matt Cohen Award	Nov 2	Candace Savage		—	
Writers' Trust of Canada	Vicky Metcalf Award for Literature for Young People	Nov 2	Elise Gravel		—	
Writers' Trust of Canada	Writers' Trust Engel/Findley Award	Nov 2	Shani Mootoo		—	
Writers' Trust of Canada	Balsillie Prize for Public Policy	Nov 29	John Lorinc	Dream States: Smart Cities, Technology, and the Pursuit of Urban Utopias	—	

=== Children's, Teen, and Young Adult ===
Award	Category	Date awarded	Recipient(s)	Work	Date Published	Ref.
American Indian Youth Literature Award	Picture Book	Jan 24	Daniel W. Vandever with Corey Begay (Illus.)	Herizon		
American Indian Youth Literature Award	Middle Grade Book	Jan 24	Brian Young	Healer of the Water Monster		
American Indian Youth Literature Award	Young Adult Books	Jan 24	Eric Gansworth	Apple (Skin to the Core)		
American Library Association	Caldecott Medal	Jan 24	Andrea Wang with Jason Chin (Illus.)	Watercress		
American Library Association	Children's Literature Legacy Award	Jan 24	Grace Lin	—	—	
American Library Association	Excellence in Nonfiction for Young Adults	Jan 24	Gail Jarrow	Ambushed!: The Assassination Plot Against President Garfield		
American Library Association	Geisel Award	Jan 24	Corey R. Tabor	Fox at Night		
American Library Association	Margaret Edwards Award	Jan 24	A.S. King	—	—	
American Library Association	Michael L. Printz Award	Jan 24	Angeline Boulley	Firekeeper's Daughter		
American Library Association	Mildred L. Batchelder Award	Jan 24	Sachiko Kashiwaba	Temple Alley Summer		
American Library Association	Newbery Medal	Jan 24	Donna Barba Higuera	The Last Cuentista		
American Library Association	Odyssey Award	Jan 24	C. G. Esperanza	Boogie Boogie, Y'all		
American Library Association	Pura Belpré Award, Author	Jan 24	Donna Barba Higuera	The Last Cuentista		
American Library Association	Pura Belpré Award, Illustrator	Jan 24	Raúl Gonzalez	¡Vamos! Let's Cross the Bridge		
American Library Association	Pura Belpré Award, Young Adult	Jan 24	Raquel Vasquez Gilliland	How Moon Fuentez Fell in Love with the Universe		
American Library Association	Schneider Family Book Award	Jan 24	Darren Lebeuf and Ashley Barron (Illus.)	My City Speaks		
American Library Association	Sibert Medal	Jan 24	Cynthia Levinson and Evan Turk (Illus.)	The People's Painter: How Ben Shahn Fought for Justice with Art		
American Library Association	Stonewall Book Award, Children's / YA	Jan 24	Kyle Lukoff	Too Bright to See		
American Library Association	Stonewall Book Award, Children's / YA	Jan 24	Malinda Lo	Last Night at the Telegraph Club		
American Library Association	Virginia Hamilton Award for Lifetime Achievement	Jan 24	Nikki Grimes	—	—	
American Library Association	William C. Morris Award	Jan 24	Angeline Boulley	Firekeeper's Daughter		
Andre Norton Award		May 21	Darcie Little Badger	A Snake Falls to Earth		
Asian/Pacific American Award	Picture Book	Jan 24	Andrea Wang and Jason Chin (Illus.)	Watercress		
Asian/Pacific American Award	Children's Literature	Jan 24	Hena Khan	Amina's Song		
Asian/Pacific American Award	Young Adult Literature	Jan 24	Malinda Lo	Last Night at the Telegraph Club		
Boston Globe-Horn Book Award	Picture Book	Jun 22	Jason Reynolds with Jason Griffin (illus.)	Ain't Burned All the Bright		
Boston Globe-Horn Book Award	Fiction and Poetry	Jun 22	Sabaa Tahir	All My Rage		
Boston Globe-Horn Book Award	Nonfiction	Jun 22	Brandy Colbert	Black Birds in the Sky: The Story and Legacy of the 1921 Tulsa Race Massacre		
Carnegie Medal		~Jun 15	Katya Balen	October, October		
Coretta Scott King Book Award	Author	Jan 24	Carole Boston Weatherford	Unspeakable: The Tulsa Race Massacre		
Coretta Scott King Book Award	Illustrator	Jan 24	Floyd Cooper	Unspeakable: The Tulsa Race Massacre		
Ezra Jack Keats Book Award	Writer	March 8	Paul Harbridge	Out Into the Big Wide Lake		
Ezra Jack Keats Book Award	Illustrator	March 8	Gracey Zhang	Lala's Word		
Sydney Taylor Book Award	Picture Book	Jan 24	Susan Kusel with Sean Rubin (Illus.)	The Passover Guest		
Sydney Taylor Book Award	Middle Grade	Jan 24	Veera Hiranandani	How to Find What You're Not Looking For		
Sydney Taylor Book Award	Young Adult	Jan 24	Aden Polydoros	The City Beautiful		
