= Mossé =

Ethnic groups

- Mossi people known as Mossé in their language Mooré

Mossé is a French surname. Notable people with the surname include:

- Gérald Mossé (born 1967), jockey
- Claude Mossé (1924–2022), French historian of ancient Greece
- fr:Claude Mossé (journaliste) (born 1928), French journalist
