= We Need New Stories =

Book

- Author: Nesrine Malik
- Genre: Non-fiction
- Publisher: W&N
- Publication date: 2019

We Need New Stories is a non-fiction book written by journalist and author Nesrine Malik in 2019. It discusses "toxic myths" on matters such as freedom of speech, political correctness, racial and identity politics, and national myths (particularly in relation to the United Kingdom and the United States, and how these impact decision-making), discussing how these concepts have been misrepresented – often to oppose progressive causes – and encouraging readers to question accepted norms.

It was first released in paperback on 20 August 2020 and a new edition was released in 2021.

== Reception ==
Robin Jones positively reviewed the book for The Paris Review, as did Sonja van der Westhuizen in a review for the South African Sunday Times.

In a review for The Guardian, Helen Charman writes, "Malik deconstructs the 'six key myths' of contemporary western society to contest the idea of exceptionalism that has come to define our current political situation," and "Malik is rigorous in her assembling of the evidence that counteracts these dominant stories, illustrating that the events of the past three years were, in fact, a point in a historical continuum." Bidisha, in a review for The Guardian, writes "Malik steers refreshingly clear of journalese and the book resembles a solid work of social science or political philosophy more than a common grab bag of extended articles." In a review for The Irish Times, Rachel Andrews writes, "Malik's tone is less musing than [Dayna] Tortorici's - she is a Guardian columnist accustomed to direct and forceful argument - but she presents her case persuasively, with admirable clarity, and in doing so cuts through a lot of the messy, often befuddling noise."

In 2020, following the release of the paperback edition of We Need New Stories, Brit Dawson of Dazed describes the book as "a revolutionary and uplifting piece of work that exposes and unpicks the toxic myths that aim to isolate the individual and stop the resistance." Publishers Weekly describes the 2021 edition of We Need New Stories as "a persuasive debunking of political and cultural myths that impede social justice in the U.S. and U.K." and writes that "Malik fluidly incorporates her experiences as a media commentator and the daughter of a conservative Muslim family, and draws on the work of scholars including Judith Butler and Jerry Lembcke. This is a lucid reminder that the fight for equality is a battle of ideas."
