= DeuxMoi =

Celebrity gossip Instagram account

Deuxmoi

Instagram information
- Page: curators of pop culture
- Genre: Celebrity gossip
- Followers: 2.3 million (June 2026)
- Website: www.deuxmoi.world

Deuxmoi (also stylized DeuxMoi or @deuxmoi) is a pseudonymous Instagram account which publishes celebrity gossip.

== History ==
The Deuxmoi account was originally used as a fashion-focused blog by two friends. During the COVID-19 pandemic, one of the two account holders asked its followers to share stories about celebrities. The account operator began posting screenshots of direct messages with stories of celebrity encounters for followers to see. The earliest stories concerned, respectively, Leonardo DiCaprio and Jonah Hill. Ownership of the handle, or the identities of those running the account, may have changed in 2021.

The Spotify Original live podcast Deux Me After Dark ran from September 2021 to November 2022. In January 2022, the podcast Deux U premiered.

In November 2022, the proprietor of the account published a novel, Anon Pls. The novel, written with Jessica Goodman, follows a fictional version of the account creator's life.

=== Content ===
The account is known for publishing stories and celebrity information considered mundane, such as food preferences, or reactions to chance encounters with fans. The account's operator has said she does not publish "sad" stories, such as those about "family situations" or "substance abuse". The account does not verify the content it publishes. The account often highlights celebrity visits to New York City restaurants, such as Carbone and Via Carota.

=== Identity ===
In May 2022, Internet culture reporter Brian Feldman wrote that there are several individuals behind Deuxmoi. Feldman wrote that Deuxmoi's founders are Meggie Kempner, a granddaughter of noted socialite Nan Kempner through her son James, and Melissa Lovallo. Lovallo still apparently runs DeuxMoi.

== Influence and reception ==
The account's focus on mundane gossip has been referred to as "toothless". DeuxMoi's focus on sightings at restaurants in New York has led to followers of the account dining at certain venues in the hopes of seeing celebrities.

On November 30, 2023, Deuxmoi shared a post claiming that American singer-songwriter Taylor Swift and her then-boyfriend, British actor Joe Alwyn, secretly married in London. A second post speculated that Swift's song "You're Losing Me" was inspired by a miscarriage that caused a rift between the now-exes. Swift's publicist, Tree Paine, refuted the marriage claims and called for accountability from DeuxMoi. The account later withdrew the second claim and apologized.

It was reported in 2023 that a HBO series inspired by Anon Pls. is in the works.
