= Blood Scion =

2022 young adult fantasy novel by Deborah Falaye

- First edition
- Author: Deborah Falaye
- Language: English
- Series: Blood Scion
- Genres: Young adult, Fantasy
- Publisher: HarperTeen
- Publication date: 8 March 2022
- Publication place: Nigeria
- ISBN: 978-0-06-322081-2

Blood Scion is a 2022 young adult fantasy novel by Nigerian Canadian writer Deborah Falaye. Falaye's debut novel, inspired by Nigerian and Yoruba mythology, was published on 8 March 2022 by HarperTeen, an imprint of HarperCollins as the first book in a planned series.

Writing the book over 10 years, Falaye drew inspiration from novels like Things Fall Apart, A Long Way Gone and They Fight Like Soldiers, They Die Like Children and as well as West African mythology and the Yoruba culture and language. The kidnapping of school girls in Nigeria by terrorists, colonization and the trauma felt by child soldiers settling after years of war and conflict motivated her to develop the story of Blood Scion.

== Development ==
Falaye grew up in Nigeria where she was fed daily with Nigerian and Yoruba mythology and culture mostly by her grandmother until she migrated to Canada with her family and noticed how different she was from other black kids. She had always wanted to write a book based on her culture and wrote two unpublished books before settling on Blood Scion. Falaye began writing the book in 2012 and drew inspiration from the Orisha and Chinua Achebe's Things Fall Apart which was the first book she read while growing up. She was also motivated by the then trending #BringBackOurGirls movement in Nigeria which stood against kidnapping of school girls by Boko Haram terrorists and the trauma of faced by child soldiers who have taken part in wars.

== Plot ==
Set in a Nigerian inspired world, Sloane Folashadé is a Yoruba girl and a Scion — people with magic who are descendants of the ancient Orisha gods and are hunted by the Lucis who colonized the fictional country of Nagea and stripped them off their culture and heritage. On her 15th birthday, she is drafted alongside her age mates to become one of the child soldier of the Lucis. Sloane refuses to run away with her village boyfriend and is taken to the island of Avalon where she will be trained to fight against other Scion and also partake in the genocide of the Yoruba people. Sloane will have to hide her identity, find out what happened to her dead mother who she believes was killed by the Lucis and destroy the Lucis from within the Army.

== Reception ==
The book received generally positive receptions from book reviewers and readers alike and will was among the most anticipated book of 2022. It was recommended by several media outlets including The Mary Sue, Bustle, BuzzFeed and Tor.com . A starred review from Booklist Review called the novel "fast pace and engaging."

A review by YA Book Central called the novel "a riveting and compelling YA dark fantasy." Sarah Perchikoff in a review for Culturess stated that "Blood Scion will captivate you from beginning to end."

Kirkus Reviews called the book "a powerful commentary on colonization and the right to rebel". Publishers Weekly praised the novel stating that "Falaye’s harrowing duology opener of survival, sacrifice, and vengeance illustrates the effects of trauma and the strength of love in driving acts potentially heinous and heroic."
