= The Ganymede Takeover =

1967 novel by Philip K. Dick

- Cover of first edition (paperback)
- Author: Philip K. Dick and Ray Nelson
- Cover artist: Jack Gaughan
- Language: English
- Genre: Science fiction
- Publisher: Ace Books
- Publication date: 1967
- Publication place: United States
- Media type: Print (hardback & paperback)
- Pages: 157

The Ganymede Takeover is a 1967 science fiction novel by American writers Philip K. Dick and Ray Nelson. It is an alien invasion novel, and similar to Dick's earlier solo novel The Game-Players of Titan.

== Plot summary ==
The novel takes place on a future Earth (vidphones, telepaths, androids, ionocraft are normal) recently conquered by aliens from Ganymede: limbless, worm-like creatures whose physical needs are attended to by a slave-race of specialist 'creeches'. Mekkis is the leader of a Ganymedean faction that opposed the war when his Oracle (a creature capable of precognition) foresaw a 'coming darkness'. The apparent success of the invasion means he is now discredited. As a result, Mekkis is saddled with the troublesome Bale of Tennessee, home to the last remaining core of resistance, the 'Neeg-parts' led by Black Muslim leader Percy X. Unknown to all concerned, another resistance movement operates covertly under cover of the World Psychiatric Association. One of its agents, Doctor Paul Rivers, is seeking to protect Percy X by assassinating his former girlfriend, TV host Joan Hiashi who is collaborating with the Ganymedeans to capture Percy X. Although Joan Hiashi switches sides after discovering that Percy X is a trained telepath who can read her mind, Percy X is still captured thanks to a tracking device planted on her by racist landowner Gus Swenesgard.

Mekkis offers Percy X the chance to become the puppet ruler of Tennessee. When the offer is violently declined, Mekkis sends Percy X and Joan to the Norwegian clinic of psychiatric genius Rudolph Balkani, who has had exceptional success turning resistors into enthusiastic collaborators via sensory deprivation therapy. Dr. Rivers manages to free Joan and Percy X, replacing them with androids. On discovering the ruse, Rudolph Balkani commits suicide. This along with a number of other suicides (encouraged by the World Psychiatric Association) lead the Ganymedians to wrongly assume that Balkani has helped the resistance infiltrate their collaborationist regime. Judging their proxy rule of Earth to be impractical, they decide to withdraw from the planet and destroy all life through a device that will block the sun's rays.

Meanwhile, the Neeg-parts have seized a cache of weapons developed by Rudolph Balkani during the war — machines that turn illusions thought up by their users into reality, and a 'hell-weapon' that was never used against the aliens, as it would destroy humanity as well. After most of his troops desert due to the psychological problems caused by the illusion machines, Percy X is finally defeated by an army of robots created by Gus Swenesgard. Dr. Rivers is sent to kill Percy X, both to prevent his capture and stop him activating the hell-weapon.

Mekkis has become obsessed with the theories of Rudolph Balkani. In order to get revenge on his enemies he forms a telepathic link with Percy X that will enable the hell-weapon to destroy those Ganymedians who are not on Earth. After killing Percy X, Rivers is able to switch off the device before humanity is destroyed, but the Ganymedians instinctively form a group mind in times of danger, and so become trapped in a permanent existential and experiential 'hell' within a dark void, unable to contact their creeches for help.

The novel ends with the creeches returning to Ganymede to start their own society, and the World Psychiatric Association supporting Gus Swenesgard as a useful puppet ruler until democracy is restored, though Dr. Rivers can't help wondering as to their true motives.
