= Jessica Grose =

American writer

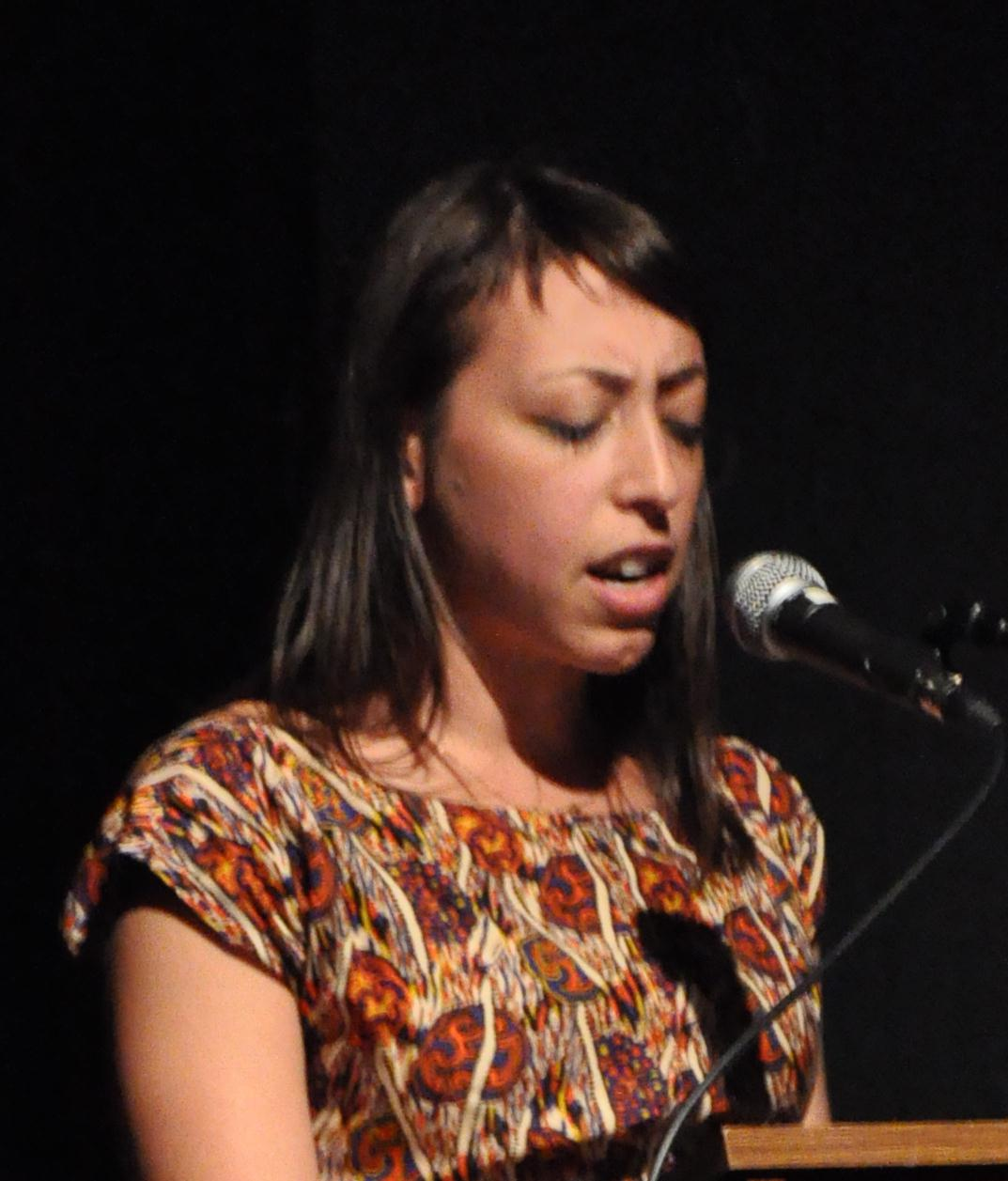
- Jessica Grose in 2010
- Born: United States
- Education: Brown University
- Occupations: Journalist; Editor; Novelist
- Years active: 2009–present
- Website: JessicaGrose.com

Jessica Ebenstein Grose is an American journalist, editor, and novelist. She is the author of the 2012 novel Sad Desk Salad, the co-author of the 2009 book LOVE, MOM: Poignant, Goofy, Brilliant Messages from Home, and the 2016 novel Soulmates. Since October 2021, Grose has written for The New York Times opinion section.

== Early life ==
Grose was born in New York City and is the daughter of psychiatrist and photographer Judith Ebenstein Grose and cardiologist Richard M. Grose.

In 2004, Grose graduated from Brown University.

== Career ==
Grose began her journalism career as associate editor of Jezebel, a blog owned by Gawker Media. Soon after, Grose and author Doree Shafrir began a popular blog titled Postcards From Yo Momma, which became the basis for a book published by Hyperion Books in March 2009 titled LOVE, MOM: Poignant, Goofy, Brilliant Messages from Home.

Grose was named managing editor of Slate's women's site DoubleX in 2009, and co-hosted its "DoubleX Gabfest" podcast alongside Hanna Rosin and Noreen Malone.

In 2012, Grose published her debut novel Sad Desk Salad through William Morrow Paperbacks / HarperCollins. It was billed "The Devil Wears Prada for the blogger age" and praised for its wit and accurate portrayal of the media by its reviewers and authors Jennifer Weiner and Amy Sohn. The novel chronicles writer Alex Lyons and satirizes the frenetic pace and moral traps of high-traffic blogging. The story is inspired by Grose's own early media career editing popular websites, including Slate and Jezebel.

Grose was deputy editor of Vulture, the culture blog of New York magazine.

Grose covers women's issues, parenting, and contemporary culture. She is a regular contributor to Fast Company, Bloomberg Businessweek, and Slate magazines. Her essays and featured reporting appear in The New York Times, Glamour, New York, Elle, The New Republic, Spin and The Village Voice.

In June 2015, Grose became editor-in-chief of Lenny Letter, a feminist newsletter and online publication co-founded by Lena Dunham and Jenni Konner.

In 2018, Grose became the parenting columnist for The New York Times. In October 2021, she moved to the New York Times opinion section to write a newsletter about what it means to be a parent.

Her book Screaming on the Inside: The Unsustainability of American Motherhood was published in December 2022.

== Personal life ==
In 2010, Grose married Michael Winton. She defined herself as a "secular, mildly observant Jew".

== Works ==
Monographs

- Shafrir, Doree; Grose, Jessica (2009). LOVE, MOM: Poignant, Goofy, Brilliant Messages from Home. New York: Hyperion. ISBN 978-1-401-32342-4. OCLC 232978087.
- Grose, Jessica (2022). Screaming on the Inside: The Unsustainability of American Motherhood. Mariner Books. ISBN 9780063078352.

Novels

- Grose, Jessica (2012). Sad Desk Salad. New York: William Morrow Paperbacks. ISBN 978-0-062-18834-2. OCLC 777623143.
- Grose, Jessica (2016). Soulmates: A Novel. New York: William Morrow. ISBN 978-0-062-39157-5. OCLC 958933366.

Selected articles

- Grose, Jessica (January 31, 2011). "Our Newlywed Money Dilemma: We just got married. How should we manage our finances?". Slate. also known as Home Economics: How Couples Manage Their Money ASIN B0051GT8U6
- Grose, Jessica (September 29, 2016). "I Love My Kids, I Just Don't Feel Bad About Leaving Them to Work". ELLE.
