= Thomas Cahill =

American scholar and writer (1940–2022)

- Born: Thomas Quinn Cahill; March 29, 1940; The Bronx, New York City, U.S.
- Died: October 18, 2022 (aged 82); Manhattan, New York City, U.S.
- Education: Columbia University
- Occupations: Scholar, writer
- Spouse: Susan Neunzig (m. 1966)
- Children: 2
- Writing career
- Notable work: The Hinges of History series

Thomas Quinn Cahill (March 29, 1940 – October 18, 2022) was an American scholar and writer. He was best known for The Hinges of History series, a prospective seven-volume series in which the author recounts formative moments in Western civilization.

== Early life ==
Cahill was born in the Bronx on March 29, 1940. His father, Patrick, worked as an insurance executive; his mother, Margaret (Buckley), was a homemaker. Cahill attended Regis High School in Manhattan, where he studied ancient Greek and Latin. He was thrown out and went on to graduate from Fordham Preparatory School. He continued his study of Greek and Latin literature, as well as medieval philosophy, scripture, and theology, at Fordham University. There he completed a Bachelor of Arts in classical literature and philosophy in 1964, before obtaining a pontifical degree in philosophy the following year as part of his studies to become a priest for the Jesuits. He ultimately decided not to pursue the priesthood, and went on to complete his Master of Fine Arts in film and dramatic literature at Columbia University in 1968.

== Career ==
Cahill resided in Ireland for 18 months from 1970 to 1971 to perform research for A Literary Guide to Ireland for Scribner's. After returning to the US, he taught at Queens College, Fordham University, and Seton Hall University. During the early 1970s, he co-authored two books with his wife, who was also a writer as well as an anthropologist. The couple later established Cahill and Company, a mail-order book company, in 1976. Cahill served as the North American education correspondent for The Times of London, and was for many years a regular contributor to the Los Angeles Times Book Review. He was also a contributor to the magazine Irish America. His manuscript for How the Irish Saved Civilization: The Untold Story of Ireland's Heroic Role From the Fall of Rome to the Rise of Medieval Europe was rejected by five publishing houses before it was accepted by Nan A. Talese at Doubleday in 1991. It sold approximately two million copies after it was published four years later and was on The New York Times Best Seller list for almost two years. It was intended as the first book in a seven-part series called Hinges of History. Cahill eventually completed six before his death.

In anticipation of writing The Gifts of the Jews (1998), Cahill studied scripture at Union Theological Seminary in New York. He also spent two years as a visiting scholar at the Jewish Theological Seminary of America, where he studied Hebrew and the Hebrew Bible. In addition to Hebrew, he read French, Italian, and German. In 1999, he was awarded an honorary doctorate from Alfred University in New York. Prior to retiring to writing full-time, Cahill was the director of religious publishing at Doubleday for six years. He and his wife divided their time between New York and Rome.

Cahill's book, A Saint on Death Row: The Story of Dominique Green, represented a departure from the Hinges of History series. It was both the story of Dominique Green, a young man from Houston who was on death row in Texas, and of the effect that knowing him had on Cahill. Arrested at age eighteen for the fatal shooting of a man during a robbery outside a Houston convenience store, Green acknowledged he took part in the robbery but insisted he did not pull the trigger. Cahill first heard about Green from Judge Sheila Murphy who was working on the appeal of the case. She requested that he visit Green, which he did in December 2003. Cahill was so impressed with Green that he joined the ultimately unsuccessful fight for Green's life, even enlisting Green's hero, Desmond Tutu, to make a historic visit to Dominique and to plead publicly for mercy. Green was executed at the age of 30 on October 26, 2004, after spending twelve years on death row. Green made a final statement before his execution:

There was a lot of people that got me to this point and I can't thank them all. But thank you for your love and support. They have allowed me to do a lot more than I could have on my own. I have overcome a lot. I am not angry but I am disappointed that I was denied justice. But I am happy that I was afforded you all as family and friends. I love you all. Please just keep the struggle going. I am just sorry and I am not as strong as I thought I was going to be. But I guess it only hurts for a little while. You are all my family. Please keep my memory alive.

== Personal life ==
Cahill married Susan Neunzig in 1966. They remained married until his death. Together, they had two children: Joseph and Kristin.

Cahill died in his sleep on October 18, 2022, at his home in Manhattan. He was 82, and suffered a heart attack.

== Publications ==
- Big City Stories by Modern American Writers, with Susan Cahill, Bantam, 1971. ISBN 9780553029451
- A Literary Guide to Ireland, with Susan Cahill, Scribner, 1973. ISBN 9780684130309
- Looking for Books: How to Find Hard-to-Find Books, Ampersand, 1988. ISBN 9780943119021
- Jesus' Little Instruction Book, Bantam, 1994. ISBN 9780553374339
- Pope John XXIII, Viking, 2002. ISBN 9780753817032
- A Saint on Death Row, from Nan A. Talese/Random House, March 2009. ISBN 9780385520195

=== The Hinges of History series ===
- How the Irish Saved Civilization, Nan A. Talese/Doubleday, 1995. ISBN 9780385418492
- The Gifts of the Jews, Nan A. Talese/Doubleday, 1998. ISBN 9780385482493
- Desire of the Everlasting Hills: The World Before and After Jesus, Nan A. Talese/Doubleday, 1999. ISBN 9780385482516
- Sailing the Wine-Dark Sea: Why the Greeks Matter, Nan A. Talese/Doubleday, 2003. ISBN 9780385495530
- Mysteries of the Middle Ages: The Rise of Feminism, Science, and Art from the Cults of Catholic Europe, Nan A. Talese/Doubleday, 2006; some printings are called Mysteries of the Middle Ages: And the Beginnings of the Modern World. ISBN 9780385495561
- Heretics and Heroes: Ego in the Renaissance and the Reformation (2013). ISBN 9780385534161

== See also ==
- James Parks Morton Interfaith Award
