= Nesrine Malik =

Sudanese-born journalist and author

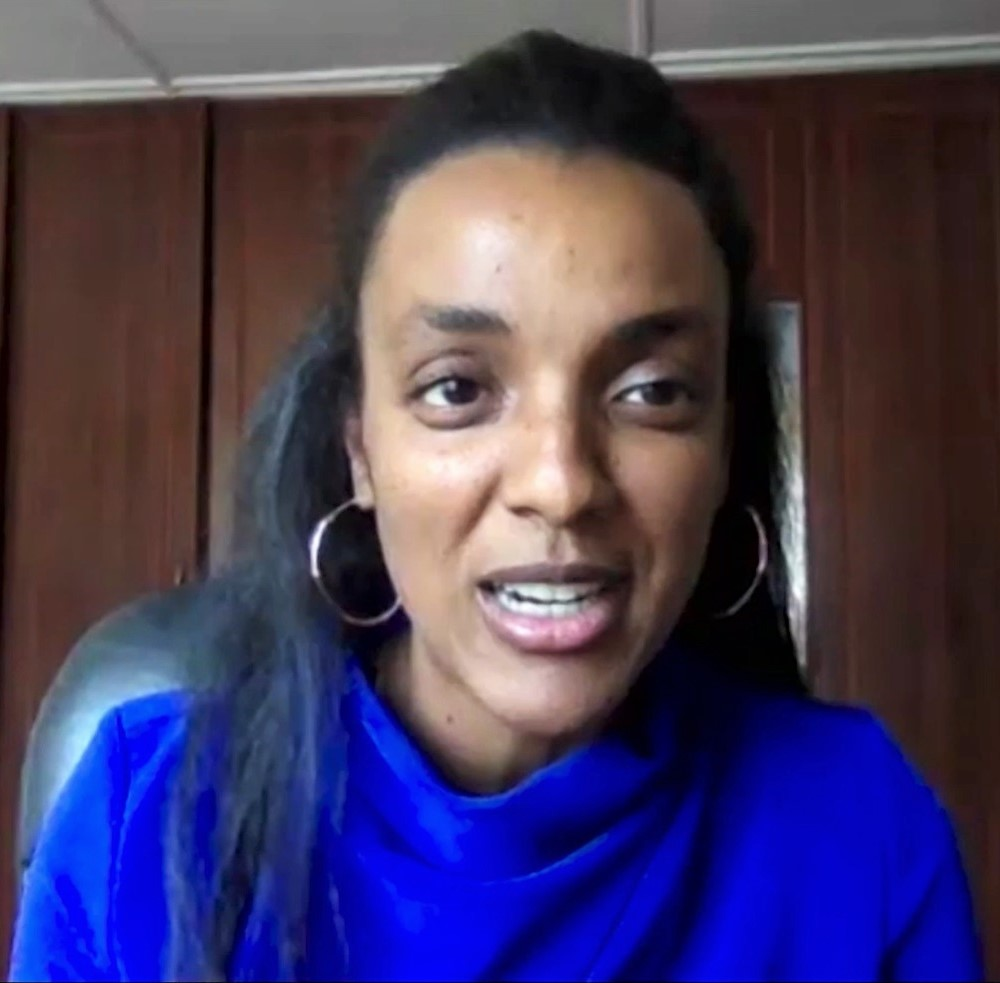
- Malik in 2021
- Born: Nesrine; Khartoum
- Citizenship: Sudan
- Education: The American University in Cairo; The University of Khartoum; The University of London
- Occupations: Journalist; author
- Employer: The Guardian
- Notable work: We Need New Stories: Challenging the Toxic Myths Behind Our Age of Discontent
- Awards: 2017 Journalist/Writer of the Year" by the Diversity in Media Awards; 2017 Society and Diversity Commentator of the Year" at the Editorial Intelligence Comment Awards.; 2019, The Orwell Prize for her work on Britain's "social evils" in "exposing the hostile environment".; 2021, the Orwell Foundation longlisted Malik again for the Orwell Prize for journalism.; 2021, the inaugural Robert B. Silvers Prize for Journalism

Nesrine Malik FRSL is a Sudanese-born journalist and author of We Need New Stories: Challenging the Toxic Myths Behind Our Age of Discontent (W&N, 2019). Based in London, Malik is a columnist for The Guardian and served as a panellist on the BBC's weekly news discussion programme Dateline London.

== Early life ==
Malik was born in Khartoum, Sudan, and was raised in Kenya, Egypt and Saudi Arabia. She attended The American University in Cairo and the University of Khartoum as an undergraduate, before moving to the UK in 2004 to complete her post-graduate study at the University of London.

== Career ==
Alongside her career as a journalist, Malik spent ten years in emerging markets private equity. She writes on British and American politics, identity politics and Islamophobia. Her comments in The Guardian after the Charlie Hebdo shooting were quoted in New York magazine and The New York Times, a topic that she also spoke about on the BBC's Newsnight alongside David Aaronovitch of The Times and Myriam François-Cerrah of the New Statesman. Malik's columns and dispatches for Foreign Policy magazine focus on Sudanese politics.

In 2015, Malik and Peter Hitchens discussed the role of the hijab and Muslim cultural identity in Britain on Channel 4 News. In 2016, Malik was one of three columnists featured in The Guardian's "The Web We Want" series discussing online abuse and negative comments they had received online regarding their work. Following this, she contributed to a session at the British Parliament with the aim of tackling the chilling effect online abuse has on emerging writers.

In 2018, journalist Peter Oborne described Malik in the British Journalism Review as writing "with wit and punch about race, class, and gender, as well as Islam". Oborne characterised her as an example of a rising generation of politicized Muslim journalists who "use their identities to shed light on the inequalities in British society. They treat Islam as a political identity as much as a religious one. Being Muslim gives this millennial generation an air not of religious but of political defiance. For them, it is a tool for showing that Britain remains a country dominated by a small group of people."

In 2019, Malik published We Need New Stories: Challenging the Toxic Myths Behind Our Age of Discontent, which was described by the South African Sunday Times as a book in which "Malik examines and deciphers falsehoods that society has come to accept as truth." It was released in paperback in 2020, and a new edition was published in 2021.

In 2020, she appeared on The Moral Maze as part of a debate hosted by Michael Buerk along with Mona Siddiqui, Tim Stanley, Andrew Doyle; the debate was over the "morality of the British Empire".

In 2025, Malik co-founded the magazine Equator.

== Honours and awards ==
In 2017, Malik was nominated "Journalist/Writer of the Year" by the Diversity in Media Awards. In the same year, she was honoured as "Society and Diversity Commentator of the Year" at the Editorial Intelligence Comment Awards.

In 2019, the Orwell Foundation longlisted Malik for the Orwell Prize for her work on Britain's "social evils" in "exposing the hostile environment". In both 2019 and 2020, Malik was shortlisted as "Comment Journalist of the Year" at the British Journalism Awards. In 2021 the Orwell Foundation longlisted Malik again for the Orwell Prize for journalism.

In 2021, Malik received the inaugural Robert B. Silvers Prize for Journalism. She was elected a Fellow of the Royal Society of Literature in 2023.
