= Yinka, Where Is Your Huzband? =

2022 novel by Lizzie Damilola Blackburn

- First edition
- Author: Lizzie Damilola Blackburn
- Language: English
- Genre: Romantic fiction
- Set in: London, England
- Publisher: Pamela Dorman Books
- Publication date: January 18, 2022
- Publication place: Nigeria
- Media type: Print (hardcover)
- Pages: 384 pages
- ISBN: 9780593299005 (first edition)
- OCLC: 1252740062

Yinka, Where Is Your Huzband? is a novel written by Nigerian novelist Lizzie Damilola Blackburn. The novel, which is her debut novel, was first published by Pamela Dorman Books, an imprint of Penguin Random House in 2022.

== Plot ==
The novel revolves around Yinka, a British-Nigerian Oxford graduate who is being pressured into getting married.

== Development ==
The novel began as a short story in a blog called "Christian-based dilemmas" which Blackburn ran. She was in her 20s, she was pressured by her mother to settle down, then she decided to write a story about it. The short story developed into a novel when she met Jackie Lau in a blogging workshop.

== Reception ==
Kristen Stewart of Library Journal described it as "... a sensitive, humorous chronicle of a young woman/'s journey of self-discovery ... This universal story of a young woman coming into her own contains many elements of Nigerian culture ... Readers who like the novels of Marian Keyes and Cecelia Ahern will find much to enjoy here." Alicia Rancilio of Associated Press described it as funny and big-hearted. She further stated that "Yinka, Where is Your Huzband? is more than a book about a woman looking for a man. It addresses themes such as female friendships, Black beauty standards and religion."
