= Brian Broome =

American writer and academic (born 1969/1970)

Brian Broome (born 1969 or 1970) is an American memoirist, poet, and screenwriter from Ohio. He is best known for his award-winning memoir Punch Me Up to the Gods.

== Education and career ==
Broome received his Bachelor of Fine Arts degree from Chatham University and his Master of Fine Arts degree from the University of Pittsburgh, where he also worked as a K. Leroy Irvis Fellow and an instructor in the Writing Program. His first full-length book, Punch Me Up to the Gods, was purchased by Houghton Mifflin Harcourt while he was still a student.

Broome currently writes for The Washington Post and is a Writer in Residence at St. Mary’s College in Moraga, California.

== Awards ==
In 2021, Broome was named Pittsburgh's Person of the Year in the Literature category.

Awards
Year	Work	Award	Result	Ref.
2018	"Gravel"	Martin Luther King, Jr. Writing Award for College Prose	Winner	
2019	“In the Hypocrisy of the Opioid Epidemic, White Means Victim, Black Means Addict”	Vann Award for Online/Health-Science-Environment	Winner	
2020	"Garbage"	Cortada Short Film Festival's Audience Choice Award	Winner	
2020	"Garbage"	Portland Short Fest	Semi-finalist	
2021	Punch Me Up to the Gods	Kirkus Prize for Nonfiction	Winner	
2022	Punch Me Up to the Gods	Israel Fishman Non-Fiction Award	Honor	
2022	Punch Me Up to the Gods	Lambda Literary Award for Gay Memoir or Biography	Winner	
2022	Punch Me Up to the Gods	Randy Shilts Award for Gay Nonfiction	Winner	
