= The Prometheus Man =

1982 novel by Ray Nelson

- Author: Ray Nelson
- Language: English
- Genre: Science fiction
- Publisher: Donning, Starblaze Editions imprint
- Publication date: 1982
- Publication place: United States
- English publication date: 233
- Media type: Print (Trade paperback)
- ISBN: 0-89865-192-1
- Dewey Decimal: 813/.54
- LC Class: PS3564.E4745P7
- Followed by: Virtual Zen

The Prometheus Man is a 1982 novel by American writer Ray Nelson. In this novel, a monopolistic insurance company takes control of planet Earth from a huge balloon drifting around the world; however, a cunning woman ruins the plans of this insurance company.

At the first Philip K. Dick Award ceremony in 1983, The Prometheus Man was awarded a Special Citation.

== Reviews ==
- Sorcerer's Apprentice #16
