= Someday, Maybe =

2022 novel by Onyi Nwabineli

- Author: Onyi Nwabineli
- Language: English
- Genre: fiction
- Publisher: Magpie Books
- Publication date: 1 November 2022
- Publication place: Nigeria
- ISBN: 978-0-86154-351-9

Someday, Maybe is a 2022 novel by British Nigerian writer Onyi Nwabineli. It was published on 1 November 2022 in the United Kingdom by Magpie Books, an imprint of Oneworld publications, and by Graydon House in the United States. It follows Eve Ezenwa-Morrow, a Nigerian woman in an interracial marriage trying to cope with grief, depression and suicide after her husband's death.

== Reception ==
The novel received critically positive reception. It was selected as one of the five books for the Good Morning America picks, with Nwabineli later appearing on the show. A review from Kirkus Reviews stated that "Nwabineli's debut is deeply moving, tender, and, against all odds, funny." Publishers Weekly in a starred review said "The genuine displays of emotion and sharp narrative will keep readers turning the pages.”
