= Ingrid D. Rowland =

American academic

Ingrid Drake Rowland
- Born: August 19, 1953 (age 73)
- Education: Pomona College; Bryn Mawr College
- Occupations: Classical scholar, professor, author

Ingrid D. Rowland (b. August 19, 1953) is professor emerita in the Department of History at the University of Notre Dame. She is a frequent contributor to The New York Review of Books.

== Biography ==
She is the daughter of Nobel Chemistry Prize laureate Frank Sherwood Rowland.

Rowland completed her Bachelor of Arts degree in classics at Pomona College in 1974 and earned her Master's and Ph.D. degrees in Greek literature and classical archaeology at Bryn Mawr College.

Prior to becoming a faculty member at Notre Dame, she taught at UCLA, and Columbia University and in the Rome programs of St. Mary's College and the University of California, Irvine and was an associate professor of art history at the University of Chicago.

Rowland writes about Italian art, architecture, history and many other topics for The New York Review of Books.

== Publications ==
- ——— (1998). The culture of the High Renaissance: ancients and moderns in sixteenth-century Rome. Cambridge, U.K. ; New York, NY, USA: Cambridge University Press. ISBN 978-0521581455.
- ———, ed. (1999). The place of the antique in early modern Europe. Chicago, Ill: David and Alfred Smart Museum of Art. ISBN 9780935573282.
- ——— (2000). The culture of the High Renaissance: ancients and moderns in sixteenth-century Rome (Revised paperback ed.). Cambridge: Cambridge Univ. Press. ISBN 978-0521794411.
- ——— (2004). The scarith of Scornello: a tale of Renaissance forgery. Chicago: University of Chicago Press. ISBN 9780226730363. (based on the "Etruscan" forgeries of Curzio Inghirami)
- ——— (2005). The Roman garden of Agostino Chigi: the thirteenth Gerson lecture, held ... in the aula of the University of Groningen on the 17th of November 2005. Groningen: The Gerson Lectures Foundation. ISBN 9789080169173.
- ——— (2005). From heaven to Arcadia: the sacred and the profane in the Renaissance. New York: New York Review Books. ISBN 1590171233.
- Giordano Bruno: Philosopher/Heretic (2008)
- ——— (2014). From Pompeii: The Afterlife of a Roman Town. Cambridge, MA: Harvard University Press. ISBN 9780674088092.
- ———; Noah Charney (2017). The collector of lives: Giorgio Vasari and the invention of art (First ed.). New York: W.W. Norton & Company. ISBN 978-0-393-24131-0.
- ——— (2019). The Divine Spark of Syracuse. Waltham, Massachusetts: Brandeis University Press. ISBN 9781512603057.
- ——— (2024). The lies of the artists: essays on Italian art, 1450-1750. Cambridge, Massachusetts: The MIT Press. ISBN 9780262549097.

== Awards and honors ==
- Grace Dudley Prize for Arts Writing, Robert B. Silvers Foundation, 2021
- Socio Corrispondente, Accademia dei septolti, Volterra, Italy, 2005
- Founding Member, Academia Bibliotecae Alexandrinae (Egypt), 2004
- Elected Member, American Academy of Arts and Sciences, 2002
- Fellow, Getty Research Institute, 2000–2001
- John Simon Guggenheim Foundation Fellowship, 2000–2001
- Quantrell Award (1994)
