= Punch Me Up to the Gods =

2021 memoir by Brian Broome

- Author: Brian Broome
- Language: English
- Genre: Memoir
- Publisher: Houghton Mifflin Harcourt
- Publication date: May 18, 2021
- Publication place: United States
- Media type: Print

Punch Me Up to the Gods is a memoir, written by Brian Broome and published May 18, 2021 by Houghton Mifflin Harcourt. The book won the Kirkus Prize for Nonfiction (2021), as well as the Lambda Literary Award for Gay Memoir or Biography (2022).

Punch Me Up to the Gods chronicles Broome's experience growing up as a queer Black boy in rural Ohio. The New York Times explained that with this book, "Broome hopes to counter the force of that punch by exploring the beauty of queer Black manhood, while offering a new way to write about that beauty."

== Background ==
Broome began writing Punch Me Up to the Gods "while in a drug and alcohol rehab facility in Washington, PA." Unable to sleep, Broome contemplated what had led him to the facility. He wrote down formative experiences in his life, which eventually shaped Punch Me Up to the Gods.

Working with his agent, Danielle Chiotti, Broome started piecing together his writing in February 2018. Broome originally thought of the book as a collection of short, autobiographical stories. However, he soon recognized that the Gwendolyn Brooks’ 1959 poem “We Real Cool” " fit perfectly with the themes emerging."

Punch Me Up to the Gods was sent out for to publishers in October 2019, and Houghton Mifflin Harcourt purchased the rights the following month. Although the major themes of the book remained unchanged, Broome's editor, Rakia Clark, helped alter the book's format.

== Reception ==
Punch Me Up to the Gods received starred reviews from Kirkus Reviews, Library Journal, and Publishers Weekly. Library Journal's Siobhan Egan called it a "compelling memoir bursting at the seams with raw power," and Kirkus Reviews referred to it as "a stellar debut memoir." Publishers Weekly explained, "There are no easy victims or villains in Broome's painful, urgent telling—his testimony rings out as a searing critique of soul-crushing systems and stereotypes."

The Chicago Review of Books's Dana Dunham called the memoir "visceral," explaining, "Broome's stories may take us many places, but they reliably return us to his body. ... Broome writes about his body in a way that you will feel in your own."

Writing for the Porter House Review, Tess Coody-Anders noted that Punch Me Up to the Gods "reads as a series of essays in which voice, time, and even point of view shift in service of evocative, unflinching storytelling."

The memoir also received positive reviews from The New York Times Book Review and the Pittsburgh Post-Gazette.

Kirkus Reviews, Library Journal, and Publishers Weekly named Punch Me Up to the Gods named one of the best nonfiction books of 2021. The New York Times included the book on its list of the "100 Notable Books of 2021."

Awards and honors
Year	Award/Honor	Result	Ref.
2021	Kirkus Prize for Nonfiction	Winner	
2022	Israel Fishman Non-Fiction Award	Honor	
2022	Lambda Literary Award for Gay Memoir or Biography	Winner	
2022	Randy Shilts Award for Gay Nonfiction	Winner	
