= Ray Nelson (author) =

American novelist (1931–2022)

- Born: Radell Faraday Nelson; October 3, 1931; Schenectady, New York, U.S.
- Died: November 30, 2022 (aged 91); Napa, California, U.S.
- Occupations: Author, cartoonist
- Known for: "Eight O'Clock in the Morning"
- Spouse(s): Perdita Lilly, Lisa Mulligan, Kirsten Enge, Helene Knox
- Website: raynelson.com

Radell Faraday Nelson (October 3, 1931 – November 30, 2022) was an American science fiction author and cartoonist most notable for his 1963 short story "Eight O'Clock in the Morning", which was later used by John Carpenter as the basis for his 1988 film They Live.

== Personal life ==
Nelson was born October 3, 1931, in Schenectady, New York, the son of Walter Hughes Nelson and Marie Reed. He has one younger brother, Trevor Reed Nelson. Ray became an active member of science fiction fandom while still a teenager at Cadillac High School in Cadillac, Michigan. After graduation, he attended the University of Chicago (studying theology), then spent four years studying in Paris, where he met Jean-Paul Sartre, Boris Vian, and Simone de Beauvoir, as well as Allen Ginsberg, Gregory Corso, William Burroughs, and other Beat Generation icons. In Paris, he worked with Michael Moorcock smuggling then-banned Henry Miller books out of France. While there, he also met Norwegian Kirsten Enge, who became his third wife on October 4, 1957. Their only child, Walter Trygve Nelson, was born September 21, 1958, in Paris. He had previously been married to Lisa Mulligan on December 13, 1955, and subsequently to fellow fan Perdita Lilly, subject of his first book, the 23-page poetry collection Perdita: Songs of Love, Sex and Self Pity, who would later marry John Boardman. He was married to published poet and professor Dr. Helene Knox, a Fulbright scholar.

Nelson died on November 30, 2022, in Napa, California, at the age of 91.

== Career ==
Nelson began his career writing and creating cartoons for science fiction fanzines. Later Nelson wrote many professionally published short stories including "Turn Off the Sky" and "Nightfall on the Dead Sea". His best-known story "Eight O'Clock in the Morning" was published in The Magazine of Fantasy & Science Fiction (November 1963). Ray Nelson and artist Bill Wray adapted the story as their comic "Nada" published in the comic book anthology Alien Encounters (No. 6, April 1986), and director John Carpenter adapted it as his film They Live (1988).

Nelson collaborated with Philip K. Dick on the 1967 alien invasion novel The Ganymede Takeover. Nelson was friends with Dick starting in childhood, and in a documentary about Dick, Nelson says that the only times that Dick tried LSD were the two times that he gave it to him. That biographical documentary about Dick, in which Nelson is a featured interviewee, is The Penultimate Truth About Philip K. Dick produced in 2007.

In the early 1970s, Nelson ran a writers' workshop at the First Unitarian Church in the San Francisco Bay Area. One of his students was Anne Rice. He was a lifetime member of the California Writers Club and an influental president for many years.

The group, Thursday's Child, would eventually be held at a number of places including, for a long time, at his home in El Cerrito, California. In addition to Rice, Marion Zimmer Bradley, Ursula K. Le Guin, and Chelsea Quin Yarbro attended.

His 1975 book Blake's Progress, in which the poet William Blake is a time traveler, was described by John Clute in The Encyclopedia of Science Fiction as "Nelson's best work". Richard A. Lupoff called it "a revelation," saying "Nelson's style is sharply focused and carefully colored... His plotting is exactly as complex as it ought to be [and] his characters are nicely drawn." It was rewritten and republished as 1985's Timequest.

At the 1982 Philip K. Dick Awards, Nelson's novel The Prometheus Man gained a special citation (runner-up).

Nelson was added to the First Fandom Hall of Fame in 2019 for "his life-long genuine love of science fiction and his enthusiastic service to that community for decades."

== Propeller beanie ==
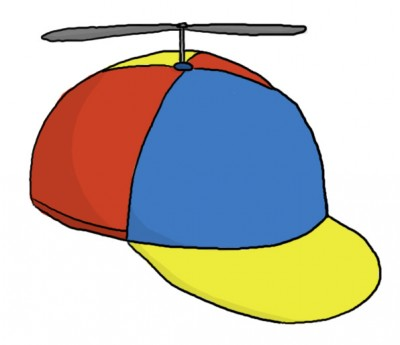
A propeller beanie hat

Nelson professed that his greatest claim to fame was as the creator of the iconic propeller beanie as emblematic of science fiction fandom while a 10th-grader at Cadillac High School. He also claims to have invented the "Beany" character in a 1948 contest for what would become Time for Beany while visiting relatives in California. "I think it's probably my best bet of being remembered", Nelson says. "I've never been on the New York Times bestseller list."

== Publications ==
- Perdita: Songs of Love, Sex, and Self Pity
- The Ganymede Takeover (with Philip K. Dick), 1967
- Blake's Progress, 1975
- Then Beggars Could Ride, 1976
- The Ecolog, 1977
- Revolt of the Unemployable, 1978
- The Prometheus Man, 1982
- Timequest, 1985
- Dog-Headed Death (Gaius Hesperian Mysteries), 1989
- Virtual Zen, 1996
