= Sribhashyam Vijayasarathi =

Indian author, grammarian, philosopher (1936–2022)

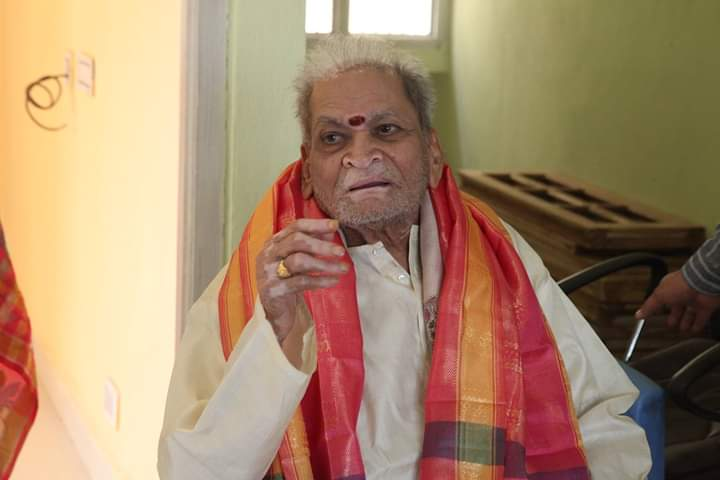
- Born: 10 March 1936; Chegurthi, Karimnagar district, Hyderabad State, British Raj
- Died: 28 December 2022 (aged 86); Karimnagar, Telangana, India
- Education: Rashtriya Sanskrit Vidyapeetha, Tirupathi; Sri Vishweshwara Sanskrit College (UG & PG), Warangal (KU)
- Known for: Sanskrit literature
- Spouse: Hemalatha
- Children: Varaprasad
- Parents: Narasimha Charya (father); Gopamamba (mother)
- Awards: Padma Shri; Mahamahopadhyaya; Vachaspati Puraskar

Sribhashyam Vijayasarathi (10 March 1936 – 28 December 2022) was an Indian author, Sanskrit grammarian, philosopher and critic.

He was the recipient of India's highly prestigious award Padma Shri for the year 2020 for his excellent work in the field of Literature and Education.

== Early life and education ==
Sribhashyam Vijayasarathi was born to Narasimhacharya, Gopamamba on 10 March 1936 at Chegurthi village, Karimnagar district, Telangana. Vijayasarathi started composing poetry at the age of 7. Although he had his primary education in Urdu medium, excelled himself as a Sanskrit scholar extraordinarily.

It was his mother who taught him "Nyaya Bodhini", "Tharka Sangrahamu", and Meemamsa. It was during this period that he composed "Sharadaa Padakinkine". His astounding scholarship came to fore with khandakavyas like "Vishaadalahari" and "Shabaree Paridevanam" which he composed at the age of sixteen.

Vijayasarathi introduced ‘seesam’, a Telugu poetic form and he was the first man who introduced epistolary form in Sanskrit. He came into the limelight for his work Mandakini and using the maximum number of ‘dhatus' in his poetry.

== Awards and recognition ==
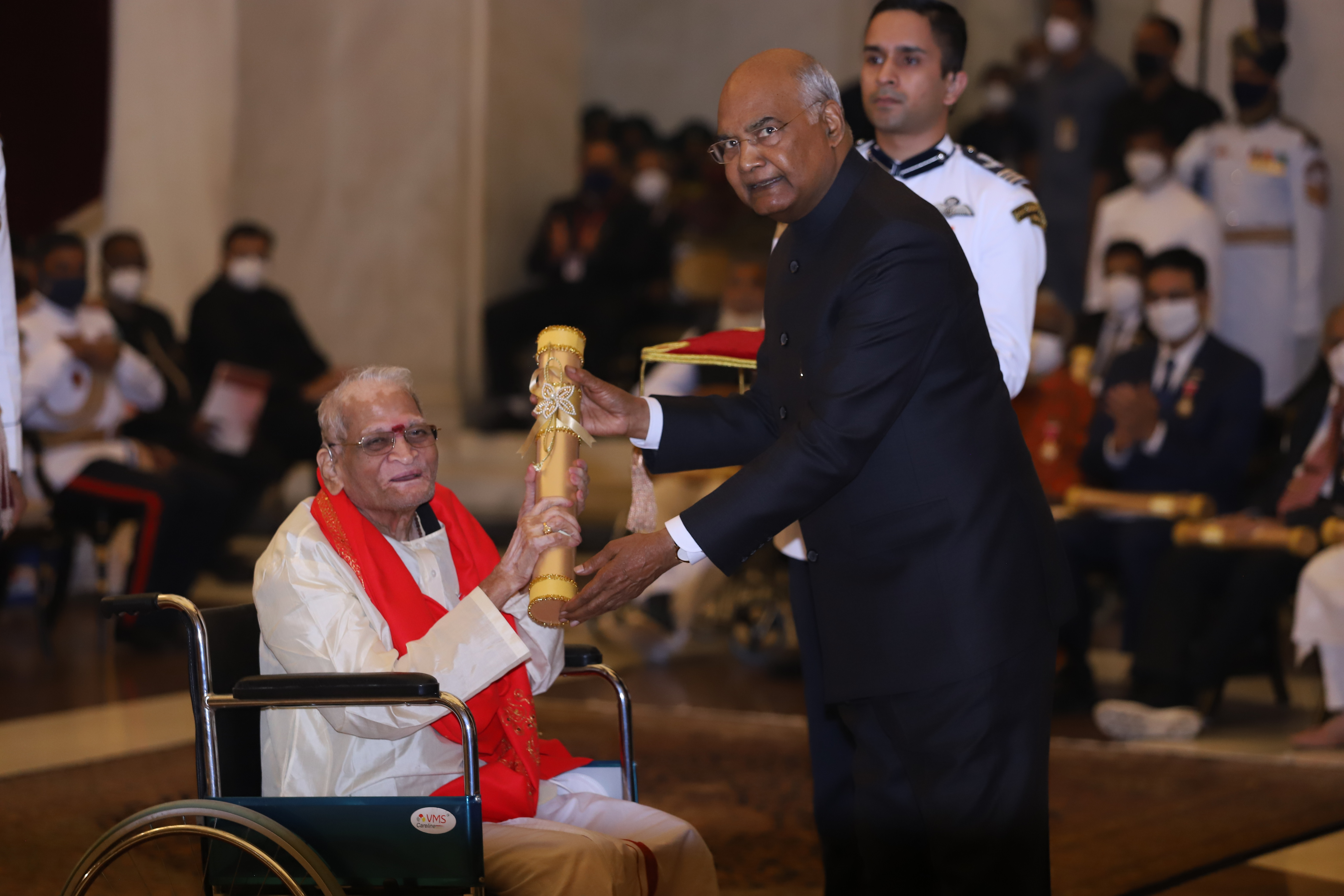
Sribhashyam Vijayasarathi receiving Padma Shri from Hon. President Ramnath Kovind

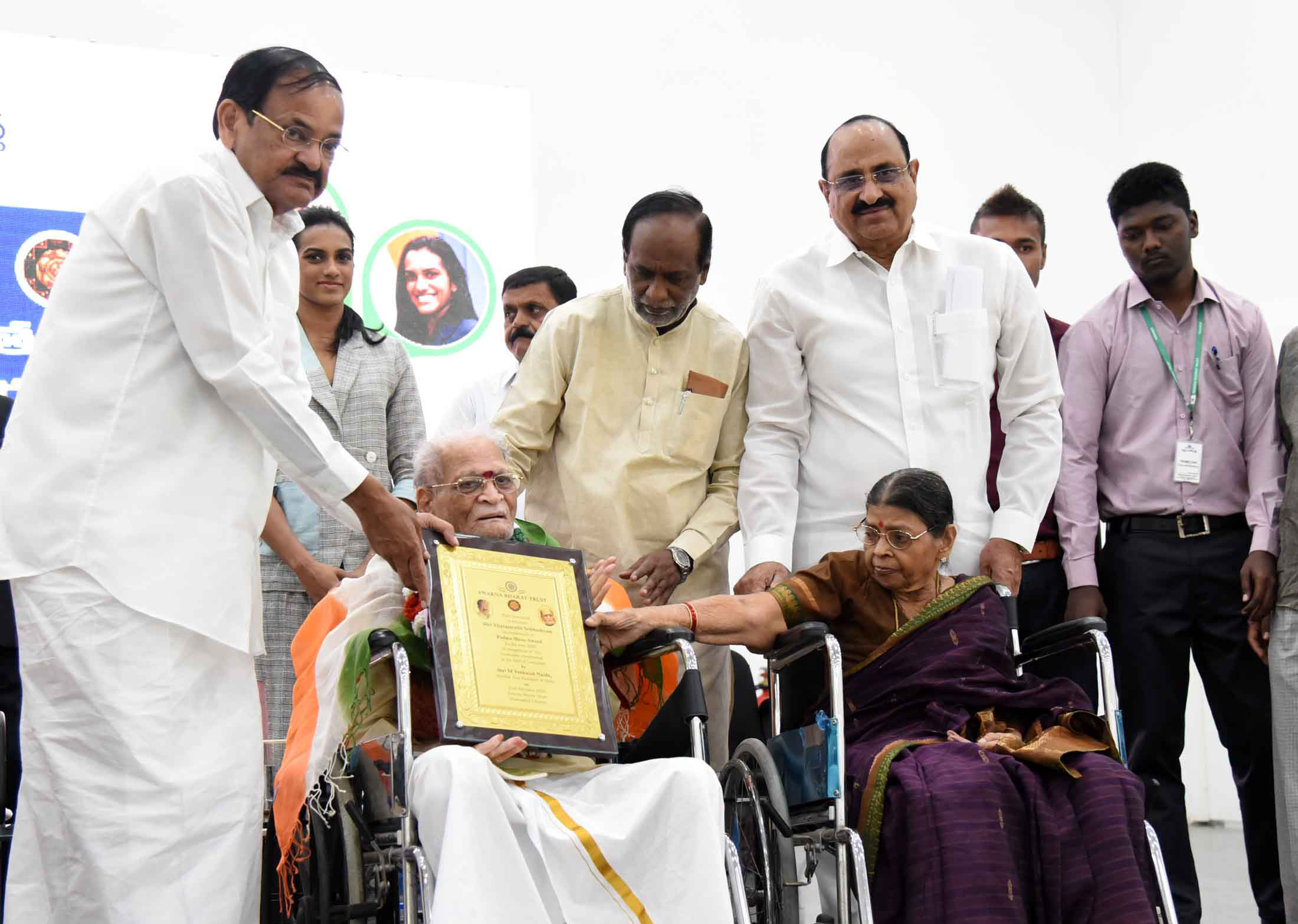
Honourable Vice-President of India Sri. Venkiah Naidu felicitating Sribhashyam Vijayasarathi on conferment of Padma Shri for the year 2020 at Swarna Bharat trust, Hyderabad on 23 February 2020

- Padma Shri award for the year 2020 in the field of Literature and Education for the state Telangana
- K. K. Birla Foundation "Vachaspati Puraskar" for the year 1996 in Jaipur
- Tilak Maharashtra Vidyapeeth awarded "Indira Behere" gold medal award for the year 1995 in Pune
- Vishishta Sahithya Puraskaram by Government of Telangana -2017
- Mahakavi title by former speaker of Andhra Pradesh Sri Ayyadevara Kaleswara Rao
- Swarna Kankanam by the then Governor of Andhra pradesh Late Sri Krishan Kant
- Kavichakravathi title by D. Sripada Rao, Ex. Speaker AP legislative Assembly
- Mahamahopaadhyaya – National Sanskrit University - Tirupati (2018)
- Uthama Samskritha Panditha Puraskaaram – Telugu University – Hyderabad
- Sanathana Dharma Charitable Trust – Ugadi Puraskaaram through the hands of Sadguru Shivananda Murthy
- Appajosyula Vishnubhotla Kandalam foundation Pratibha Murthy Jeevithakala Sadhana Puraskaram-2021 in Hyderabad

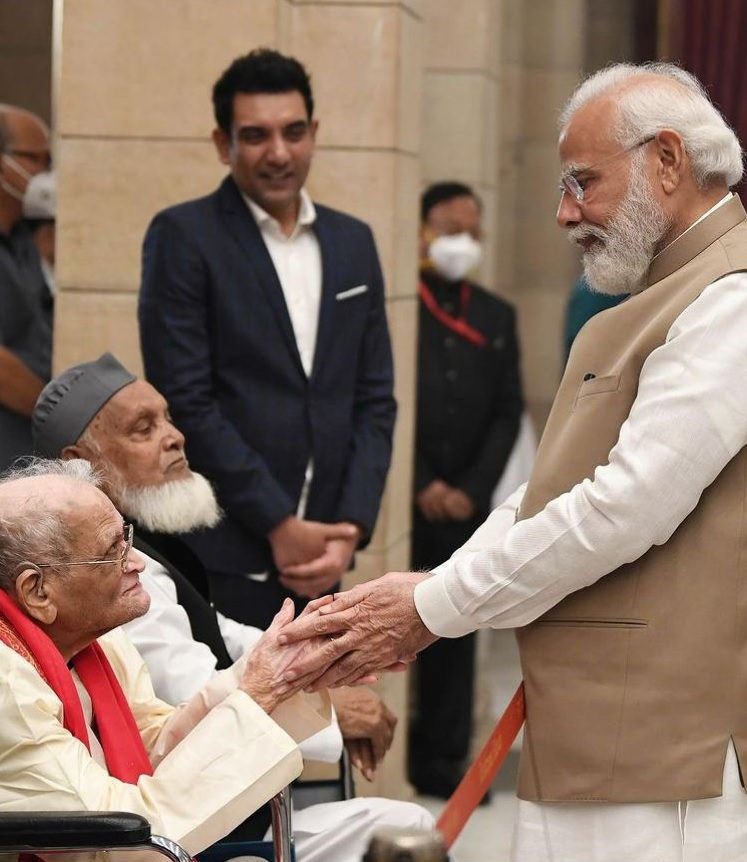
PM Narendra Modi congratulates Sribhashyam Vijayasarathi during Padma Shri Award Ceremony

== In his honor ==
Sribhashyam Vijayasarathi National Sanskrit Award is awarded every year. This award carries a cash reward of Rs.25000, Mangala Vastram and a Memento to a Sanskrit poet on the occasion of Sribhashyam Vijayasarathi's birthday.

Karimnagar Municipal Corporation has named the road from Kapuwada to Bommakal bypass road via Yagnavaraha Kshetram as Sribhashyam Vijayasarathi Marg and Gangula Kamalakar inaugurated the Marg on January 25, 2024.

Gangula Kamalakar also announced that the Kala Bharathi cultural center which is being constructed in the SRR College campus, Karimnagar will be named after Sribhashyam Vijayasarathi and a bronze statue of Vijayasarathi would also be installed in the new auditorium.

== Bibliography ==
Sribhashyam Vijayasarathi had written more than 100 books in Sanskrit and Telugu like Mandakini, Bharathabharathi, Raasakeli, Rochishmathi, Praveena Bharatham, Vishadalahari, Sangeetha Madhavam, Prahelikalu, Sharada Padakinkinkini, Geetanjali (Sanskrit translation of Rabindranath Tagore's Geetanjali), Manorama (Novel) and Shusheela (Novel) to name a few. He was instrumental in writing about the history and culture of India in lucid Sanskrit. He had left no genre untouched in Sanskrit. He was a spiritual humanist and progressive writer. He had been rendering yeoman service in spreading the Sanskrit language by conducting free Sanskrit classes, organizing Vidwat Sabhas, poetic symposia and publishing booklets on different issues of Sanatana Dharma.

== Philanthropy ==
Sribhashyam Vijayasarathi formed a platform called Sarvavaidka Samsthanam at Karimnagar of Telangana State in the year 1980 to take up literary, social and spiritual activities. He carried out various programs in a rare manner from this platform successfully. He conducted free spoken Sanskrit classes to popularize the Sanskrit language. He also organized Vidwat Sabhas every year. Vijayasarathi also conducts poetic symposia every year to encourage the budding poets in Sanskrit.

Sarvavadikika Samsthanam, in addition to spreading vedic knowledge, serving Sanskrit language, setting up Aarsha Dharma, also takes responsibility of maintaining the Yagnavaraha Kshetram temple which was established by Sribhashyam Vijayasarathi in 1986. He performed many Yagnas, for the well-being of the society, in the premises of Yagnavaraha Kshetram, Karimnagar.
