= How the Irish Saved Civilization =

1995 nonfiction book by Thomas Cahill

- Author: Thomas Cahill
- Language: English
- Subject: History of Ireland
- Publisher: Nan A. Talese
- Publication date: 1995
- Publication place: Ireland
- Pages: 246
- ISBN: 0-385-41848-5
- OCLC: 30700982
- Dewey Decimal: 941.501 20
- LC Class: DA930.5 .C34 1995

How the Irish Saved Civilization: The Untold Story of Ireland's Heroic Role from the Fall of Rome to the Rise of Medieval Europe is a non-fiction historical book written by Thomas Cahill.

Cahill argues a case for the Irish people's critical role in preserving Western Civilization from utter destruction by the Huns and the Germanic tribes (Visigoths, Franks, Angles, Saxons, Ostrogoths, etc.). The book presents Western history from the collapse of the Roman Empire and the pivotal role played by members of the clergy at the time. A particular focus is placed upon Saint Patrick. The book details his early struggles through slavery, mirroring much of the content in The Confession of Saint Patrick. Initial portions of the book examine Ireland before the arrivals of Patrick and Saint Augustine of Canterbury. Particular focus is placed upon Saint Columba, the monks he trained, and the monasteries he set up in the Hiberno-Scottish mission. These holy men, according to Cahill, "single-handedly refounded European civilization throughout the continent." (p. 4)

== Publication and reception ==
How the Irish Saved Civilization was first published in March 1995 and appeared on the New York Times Bestseller List for almost two years.

It was favourably reviewed in many general-interest, quality newspapers and magazines. However, it also provoked criticism from other reviewers, some of whom offered qualified praise or outright rejections of the main thesis, and some of whom perceived bias.
