= Screaming on the Inside =

2022 non-fiction book by Jessica Grose

Screaming on the Inside: The Unsustainability of American Motherhood
- Author: Jessica Grose
- Subject: Motherhood
- Publisher: Mariner Books
- Publication date: December 6, 2022
- ISBN: 9780063078352

Screaming on the Inside: The Unsustainability of American Motherhood is a 2022 non-fiction book by Jessica Grose.

== Overview ==
Screaming on the Inside describes the experience of motherhood in the United States, with Grose using her personal experience as a mother as a foundation on which to build a criticism of the expectations American society has for mothers.

== Development history ==
Jessica Grose has written a parenting column for The New York Times since 2018 with a focus on women's issues. She interviewed hundreds of women as part of the research process while writing the book.

=== Publication history ===
Screaming on the Inside was published by Mariner Books on December 6, 2022.

== Reception ==
Anna Nordberg praised Grose for bringing "a journalist's perspective" to the subject of motherhood in The San Francisco Chronicle. Kim Brooks wrote positively about Grose's argumentation throughout the book but criticized her for not fully examining the systemic issues discussed. Publishers Weekly recommended the book to "mothers struggling to keep their heads above water" and wrote positively about Grose's blend of historical research and personal narrative. Kirkus Reviews praised Grose's prose but criticized her historical analysis as being "more relevant to White, heterosexual, cisgendered mothers." Elaine Margolin was more critical of the book, writing in The New York Journal of Books that Grose's historical analysis was impressive but that the memoir sections often fell flat. Margolin presented Rebecca Solnit and Deborah Levy as points of comparison. Positive reviews of the book were also published in Library Journal and Booklist.
