= Lani Forbes =

American author of young adult novels (1987–2022)

- Born: Lani Carin Smith; May 6, 1987; Huntington Beach, California, U.S.
- Died: February 3, 2022 (aged 34); Boise, Idaho, U.S.
- Occupation: Author
- Genre: Young adult fiction
- Spouse: Kevin
- Children: 3

Website
- laniforbes.com

Lani Forbes (May 6, 1987 – February 3, 2022) was an American author of young adult novels, most known for her fantasy series, Age of the Seventh Sun.

== Life ==
Forbes was born on May 6, 1987, in Huntington Beach, California. Her mother was a librarian, and her father was a surfer. After graduating from Huntington Beach High School in 2005, Forbes received a bachelor's degree in psychology from Hope International University, then a teaching certificate from California State University.

As a teen, Forbes lived with an anxiety disorder. After the birth of her first child, she had severe postpartum depression. When she became pregnant a second time, she decided to focus on her writing to help mitigate any symptoms of the disorder.

=== Cancer ===
In early 2021, Forbes began having severe back pain, which both she and her doctor attributed to her pregnancy. The day after giving birth, she lost feeling in her tongue, which led to further investigation regarding stroke and other potential health issues. While still in the hospital with her newborn son, doctors told Forbes and her husband, Kevin, that she had tumor growth on her lung, liver, and spine. Later that day, she was diagnosed with stage IV high grade neuroendocrine carcinoma.

Forbes died nine months later, in Boise, Idaho, on February 3, 2022, at the age of 34.

Josh Stanton, the president & CEO of her publishing company, Blackstone Publishing, said, “We are devastated by Lani’s passing, and we deeply mourn the loss of this exceptionally talented young writer, who gave so much to her readers. We are committed to keeping Lani’s incredible legacy alive. Her powerful, captivating young adult novels will live on to be enjoyed and beloved by readers for generations to come.”

== Career ==
Forbes taught science for ten years then became a trauma counselor for "women who had been abused by their spouses through addiction."

In 2020, Forbes published the first novel in her young adult fantasy series, The Age of the Seventh Sun. After publication, she became a member of Romance Writers of America and the Society for Children's Book Writers and Illustrators.

After her cancer diagnosis, Forbes continued to write, stating,

The reality is, we cannot control what happens to us in life. Sometimes things happen that seem incredibly unfair. But no matter what happens to us, no matter what is taken from us or forced upon us, the one thing we always have power over is how we choose to respond. We get to choose how we will handle those crises. We can choose cowardice, we can choose to give up, stop trying, to give into despair. Or, we can choose joy perseverance, and yes, even happiness despite our circumstances.

The final book of The Age of the Seventh Sun series will be published on February 15, 2022. Her publishing company also received another project from her, which will be published posthumously.

=== The Age of the Seventh Sun series ===
The Age of the Seventh Sun is a young adult fantasy series published by Blackstone Publishing that consists of three books: The Seventh Sun (2020), The Jade Bones (2021), and The Obsidian Butterfly (2022). The books include romance elements and are "based on the legends and history of the Aztec and Maya people."

==== The Seventh Sun (2020) ====
The Seventh Sun, published February 18, 2020, follows Prince Ahkin and Mayana through a near apocalypse as the sun is fading. Prince Ahkin's family should be able to control the sun, and Mayana's family should be able to control the water. Together, they must find a way to save their people.

Kirkus Reviews called the novel "[a] page-turning adventure that, though imperfect, highlights a rich and relatively unknown mythological heritage that begs to be explored."

In 2021, the book won a Realm Award for the Debut, Epic Fantasy, and Young Adult categories, as well as HOLT Medallion for Best First Book. It was also a HOLT Medallion finalist for Paranormal/Time Travel/Futuristic/Fantasy.

==== The Jade Bones (2021) ====
The Jade Bones, published February 16, 2021, follows Mayana and Ahkin after they are cast into the underworld. The two must fight against unknown dangers and horrors to make their way back to their home and reclaim the throne. On the surface, Yemania is faced with the possibility of becoming a High Healer, a position she doesn't want. She meets Ochix, who comes from an enemy town, and much like Romeo and Juliet, they must decide whether their love is worth the wrath of their people.

Kirkus Reviews called the novel "[a] mythical, magical, and introspective adventure that celebrates Mesoamerican heritage," while stating, "more, please."

==== The Obsidian Butterfly (2022) ====
The Obsidian Butterfly, published February 15, 2022, follows Mayana and Ahkin as they once again face a near apocalypse and Yemania and Ochix who face their people's wrath.

Kirkus Reviews offered the book a starred review, calling it "[a] pulse-quickening, soul-aching, and truly satisfying end to the cycle."

== List of works ==
=== Anthology contributions ===
- It's All in the Story: California: An Anthology of Short Fiction, edited by D. P. Lyle (2017)
- Warriors Against The Storm, edited by Andrew Winch (2020)

=== The Age of the Seventh Sun series ===
- The Seventh Sun (2020)
- The Jade Bones (2021)
- The Obsidian Butterfly (2022)

=== Published Posthumously ===
- Face the Night (2023)
- Master of Memories (2024)
