= Leila Philip =

American writer, poet and educator (born 1961)

- Born: April 18, 1961 (age 65); New York City, U.S.
- Education: Princeton University (BA); Columbia University (MFA)
- Spouse: Garth Evans
- Writing career
- Genres: Poetry; Non-Fiction
- Website: leilaphilip.com

Leila Philip (born April 18, 1961) is an American writer, poet and educator.

== Life ==
Leila Philip grew up in New York City and graduated from Princeton University in 1986, with a A.B. in Comparative Literature and a Fifth-Year Degree in East Asian Studies From 1983 to 1985, she apprenticed to Nagayoshi Kazu, a master potter in southern Kyushu, then went on to earn an MFA at Columbia University as the Woolrich Fellow in Fiction.

Philip has taught writing and literature at Princeton University, Columbia University, Emerson College, Colgate University, Vassar College, and at the Ohio University as the James Thurber Writer in Residence. In 2004 she joined College of the Holy Cross' English department where she teaches creative writing and literature in the Creative Writing Program and the Environmental Studies Program.

Philip has taught at writing conferences and low residency MFA Programs including Stonecoast, The Chenango Valley Writers Conference, and Fairfield University. Since 2010, she has taught at the MFA Program at Ashland University.

== Bibliography ==
- Beaverland: How One Weird Rodent Made America. Twelve Books. Hachette Publishing Group. 2022. ISBN 9781538755198. "Beaverland: How One Weird Rodent Made America."
- Philip, Leila (2015). "Water Rising". River Teeth: A Journal of Nonfiction Narrative. 15 (2). New Rivers Press: 1–2. doi:10.1353/rvt.2014.0008. S2CID 201777731.

A collaboration between Leila Philip and her partner Garth Evans.

- A Family Place: A Hudson Valley Farm, Three Centuries, Five Wars, One Family. Viking. 2001. ISBN 978-0-6700-3013-2. "A Family Place: A Hudson Valley Farm, Three Centuries, Five Wars, One Family."

One woman's journey to uncover her family's history and understand the ties that bind us to a particular place.

Winner of the Victorian Society Book Award

- Hidden Dialogue: A Discussion Between Women in Japan and the United States. U.S. Japan Program Series, New York Japan Society. 1992. ISBN 9780685703670.

Examines the evolving roles of women in Japan and the implications for Japanese society.

- The Road Through Miyama. Random House. 1989. ISBN 978-0-3945-7818-7. "The Road Through Miyama."

The story of Leila Philip's journey to Miyama–a village settled almost four centuries ago by seventy Korean potters–where she was accepted as an apprentice into the workshop and home of master potter Kazy Nagayoshi and his wife, Reiko.

== Anthologized ==
- 2015: Brief Encounters, edited by Judith Kitchen, (W. W. Norton & Company)
- 2010: Why We're Here, edited by Bob Cowser, (Colgate University Press)
- 2008: Creating Nonfiction, edited by Becky Bradway, (St. Martin's Press)
- 1993: Maiden Voyages, edited by Mary Morris, (Vintage Books)

== Awards and honors ==
- 2020 Furthermore Publication Award, J.M, Kaplan Fund
- 2020 Society of Environmental Journalists Story Grant Award
- 2019 Michigan Humanities Council Fellowship
- 2017 American Antiquarian Society Artist & Writers Baron Fellowship for Historical Research
- 2015 Ct Arts /NEA Initiative Grant funded by the National Endowment for the Arts
- 2014: National Endowment for the Humanities Summer Stipend
- 2007: Guggenheim Fellowship, Literary Nonfiction
- 2002: Publication Award, the Victorian Society of America
- 2000: National Endowment for the Humanities Fellowship in American Studies
- 1999: American Association of University Women, American Fellowship
- 1999: Furthermore, J.M. Kaplan Fund
- 1994: National Endowment for the Arts Fellowship in Literature
- 1991: James Thurber Writer-in-Residence, The Ohio State University, Columbus
- 1990: PEN/Martha Albrand Special Citation for Nonfiction.
