= Anon Pls. =

2022 novel by DeuxMoi and Jessica Goodman

- First edition cover
- Author: DeuxMoi and Jessica Goodman
- Cover artist: Kerry Rubenstein
- Language: English
- Genre: Autofiction
- Publisher: William Morrow and Company
- Publication date: November 8, 2022
- Publication place: United States
- Media type: Print; ebook
- Pages: 288 (Hardcover 1st edition)
- ISBN: 9780063257801

Anon Pls. is a novel by the pseudonymous author DeuxMoi and Jessica Goodman. The novel is a work of autofiction and a retelling of the real-life DeuxMoi Instagram account, which anonymously publishes celebrity gossip on social media.

== Plot ==
The book is a fictionalized retelling of the genesis of DeuxMoi. Cricket Lopez is a celebrity stylist assistant who posts celebrity gossip on an anonymous Instagram account. When the account experiences overnight success and goes viral on social media, she struggles to balance the increasing demands of the account with her work life.

== Development history ==
Anon Pls. was developed as part of a larger attempt to monetize the DeuxMoi account. DeuxMoi came up with the initial concept and was connected to Jessica Goodman through their respective literary agents. While Goodman did much of the writing, she regularly collaborated with DeuxMoi to confirm various details about the celebrity world and to include references to real-world events.

=== Publication history ===
The novel was published in the United States on November 8, 2022 by William Morrow and Company.

=== Explanation of the novel's title ===
When gossip is submitted to the DeuxMoi account, submitters often request anonymity by saying "anon pls" or a variation of the phrase.

== Reception ==
Observer praised the book for capturing "how celebrity gossip culture has been completely democratized by armchair commentators" and commented that the reflections throughout on the nature of internet anonymity were surprisingly thoughtful. Booklist's Susan Macguire positively compared it to Lauren Weisberger's 2003 novel The Devil Wears Prada. Kirkus Reviews praised the authors' prose and drew comparison to other books in the autofiction genre. Publishers Weekly was more critical, describing the book as "evocative if underwhelming" and criticizing the exposition throughout.

The book was named one of NPR's "Books We Love" for 2022.

== HBO Max series ==
Prior to the novel's publication, HBO Max and WBTV acquired the rights to develop Anon Pls. into a drama series. Sarah Schechter and Greg Berlanti will be executive producers for the show. Fletcher Peters, of The Daily Beast, criticized the acquisition, writing that while she did not believe the DeuxMoi account to be actively malicious, the account's sharing of private details "is not the type of behavior that should be rewarded with a book, nor a TV show, nor the gorges of followers she's amassed on Instagram."
