= Onyi Nwabineli =

Nigerian-British novelist and mentor

- Born: Benin, Nigeria
- Education: Brunel University London
- Years active: 2021–present

Onyi Nwabineli is a British novelist. She is known for her contemporary novels Someday, Maybe (2022), which was a Good Morning America (GMA) and Country & Town House Book Club pick, and Allow Me to Introduce Myself (2024).

== Early life ==
Nwabineli was born in Benin, Nigeria to Igbo parents and grew up in Glasgow, the Isle of Man and Newcastle upon Tyne, where she attended Emmanuel College, Gateshead. Nwabineli graduated with a Bachelor of Arts (BA) in English with Creative Writing from Brunel University London in 2007.

== Career ==
Via a three-way auction in summer 2022, Magpie (a OneWorld Publications imprint) acquired the rights to publish Nwabineli's debut novel Someday, Maybe that autumn. The U.S. publishing rights went to Graydon House. Someday, Maybe was a Good Morning America (GMA) and Country & Town House Book Club pick.

At the start of 2024, Nwabineli signed a further two-book deal with Magpie. Her second novel Allow Me to Introduce Myself was published in 2024. The novel explores the world of family web influencers from the perspective of 25-year-old Anuri, who was raised a child influencer by her parents. Allow Me to Introduce Myself was selected by Ayọ̀bámi Adébáyọ̀ for the Hay Festival.

== Personal life ==
Nwabineli is neurodivergent.

== Bibliography ==
- Someday, Maybe (2022)
- Allow Me to Introduce Myself (2024)
