= Merve Emre =

Turkish-American writer

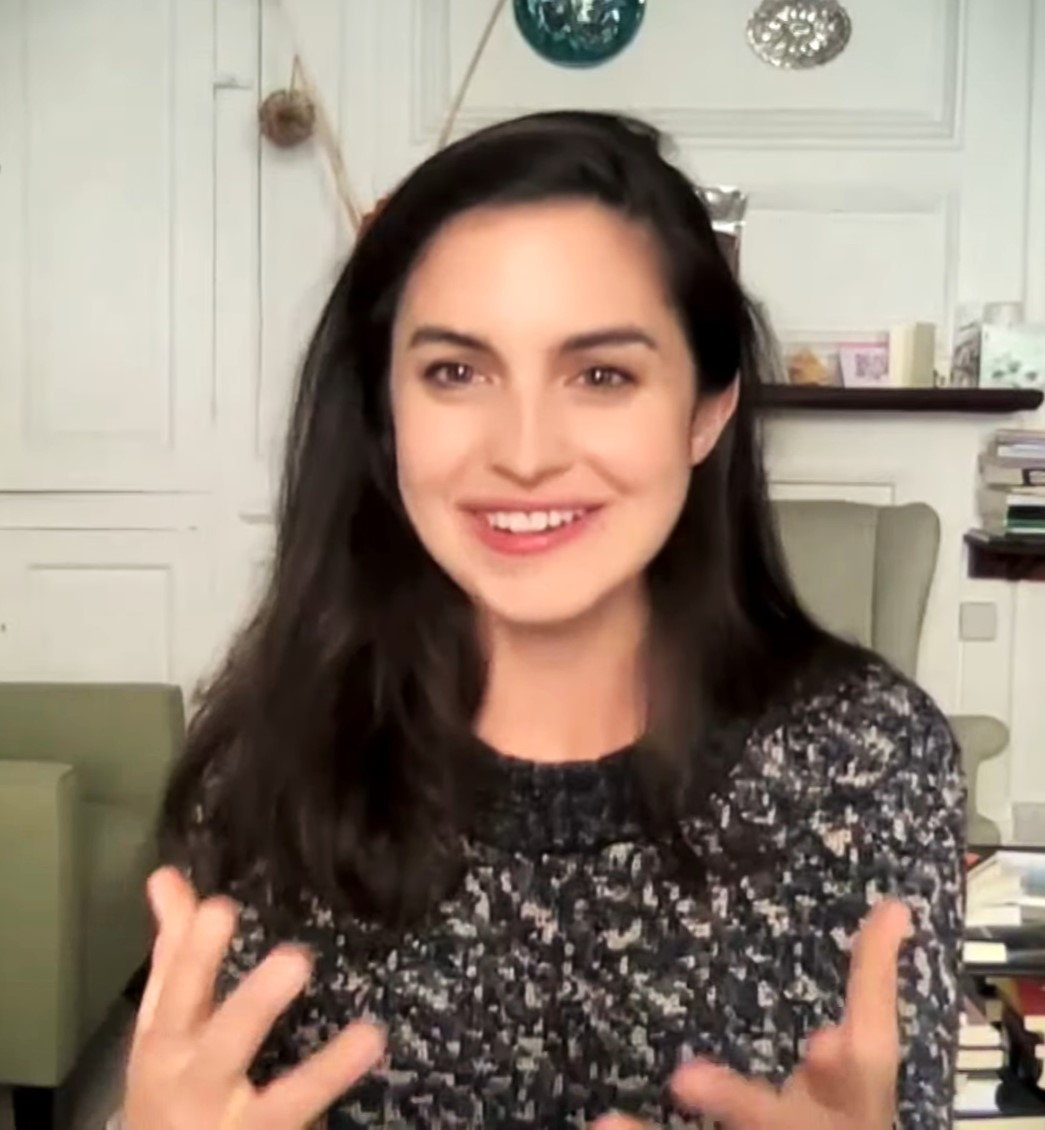
Emre speaks to the British Library in 2022

Merve Emre is a Turkish-American author, academic, and literary critic. She is the author of nonfiction books Paraliterary: The Making of Bad Readers in Postwar America (2017) and The Personality Brokers: The Strange History of Myers-Briggs and the Birth of Personality Testing (2018), and has published essays and articles in The Atlantic, Harper's Magazine, The New York Times Magazine, and other publications.

Formerly a professor at McGill and Oxford, she moved to Wesleyan University in 2023.

== Early life ==
Emre was born in Adana, Turkey. She graduated in 2003 from Paul D. Schreiber Senior High School in Port Washington, New York.

== Career ==
After graduating in 2007 from Harvard, where she concentrated in government, Emre worked for six months as an assistant marketing consultant at Bain & Company. Emre says that she was a "terrible consultant" and spent most of her time at Bain studying for the literature Graduate Record Examinations under her desk. However, Chris Bierly, her mentor at Bain, called her "other-level intelligent" and said "Of all the people I've recruited to Bain in the 30 years, and this is in the thousands, she is one of the brightest". It was at Bain that Emre first took the Myers–Briggs Type Indicator, which would later be the subject of her second work of nonfiction, The Personality Brokers.

Emre earned her PhD in English literature from Yale University and thereafter joined the English department faculty at McGill University in Montreal, Canada. In 2018, she was appointed an associate professor of American literature at Oxford University.

In 2023, Emre was named the Shapiro-Silverberg University Professor of Creative Writing and Criticism at Wesleyan University as well as director of the school's Shapiro Center for Creative Writing and Criticism.

== Works ==
Emre has written extensively about the pseudonymous writer Elena Ferrante, including a lengthy essay on Ferrante's collaboration with HBO on the television series My Brilliant Friend, based on Ferrante's Neapolitan Novels. Ferrante, a famously private author who uses an alias, agreed to field questions for Emre's essay on the HBO series, resulting in a two-month correspondence between the two. She has argued against the position taken by other writers and critics, including Alexander Chee, that Ferrante's identity is irrelevant to her work; Emre contends that it is "precisely [Ferrante's] refusal of the biographical, and her subsequent representation of that refusal, that has lodged the biographical ever deeper into the heart of what she writes."

Emre's literary criticism focuses principally on "form and style", which she contends is missing from much of today's criticism. "I continue to be surprised by how few critics actually engage with the text itself, how so much of the criticism is just a projection of people's feelings and a little bit of hand waving at plot and theme", Emre has said.

In 2017, Emre published Paraliterary: The Making of Bad Readers in Postwar America (The University of Chicago Press). The Los Angeles Review of Books said that Paraliterary is about "bad readers", and "is appropriately conscious that throughout the 20th century, a disproportionate number of readers labeled bad were female." Emre published The Personality Brokers (Penguin Random House) a year later; it is a historical and biographical account of Katharine Briggs and Isabel Briggs Myers' invention of the Myers–Briggs Type Indicator (MBTI). She is finishing a book titled Post-Discipline, and is reportedly working on a book to be titled The Female Cool, about "cold, cruel, unsentimental, unempathetic women writers and artists."

== Reception ==
The Personality Brokers generally received favorable reviews. The New York Times called the work "inventive and beguiling". The Wall Street Journal called it a "riveting" book to which Emre brought "the skills of a detective, cultural critic, historian, scientist and biographer". The Personality Brokers was listed in the New York Times Critics' Top Books of 2018 and named one of The Economist's "books of the year" for 2018.

However, Louis Menand, writing for The New Yorker, criticized Emre for using the "wrong context" to analyze the MBTI's historical antecedents and took issue with her credentials for critiquing the MBTI, arguing that "professors are the last people who should object to society's people-sorting operations." Louis Menand, himself a professor, in turn faced criticism for his review, including the charge that Menand betrayed a "fundamental misunderstanding" of how the MBTI was intended to be used.

== Personal life ==
Emre was married to Christian Nakarado and they have two children. They divorced in August 2025.

== Bibliography ==
=== Books ===
- Paraliterary: The Making of Bad Readers in Postwar America. Chicago: The University of Chicago Press. 2017.
- The Personality Brokers: The Strange History of Myers-Briggs and the Birth of Personality Testing. New York: Doubleday. 2018. ISBN 978-0385541909.
- Emre, Merve; Chihaya, Sarah; Hill, Katherine; Richards, Jill (2020). The Ferrante Letters : An Experiment in Collective Criticism. New York: Columbia University Press. ISBN 9780231194563.

=== Essays and reporting ===
- "All Reproduction Is Assisted". Boston Review. Summer 2018.
- "Elena Ferrante Stays Out of the Picture". The New York Times Magazine. November 4, 2018.
- "Timeless Quickies". The New York Review of Books. 66 (3). February 21, 2019.
- "Art After Sexual Assault". The Atlantic. May 2019.
- "Dismembered, Relocated, Rearranged". The New York Review of Books. 66 (10). June 6, 2019.
- (November 16, 2020). "Tricked Out". The New Yorker .
- "Extravagant creatures : Leonora Carrington's matriarchal Surrealism". The Critics. Books. The New Yorker. Vol. 96, no. 42. December 28, 2020. pp. 83–86.
- "Getting to Yes: The Making of 'Ulysses.'" New Yorker, February 14 & 21, 2022, 68–73.

== Awards ==
Year	Award	Result	Ref
2019	Philip Leverhulme Prize in Languages & Literature	Recipient	
2021	Robert B. Silvers Prize for Literary Criticism	Recipient	
2021	Nona Balakian Citation for Excellence in Reviewing	Recipient	
