= Joëlle Guillais =

French writer (1952–2022)

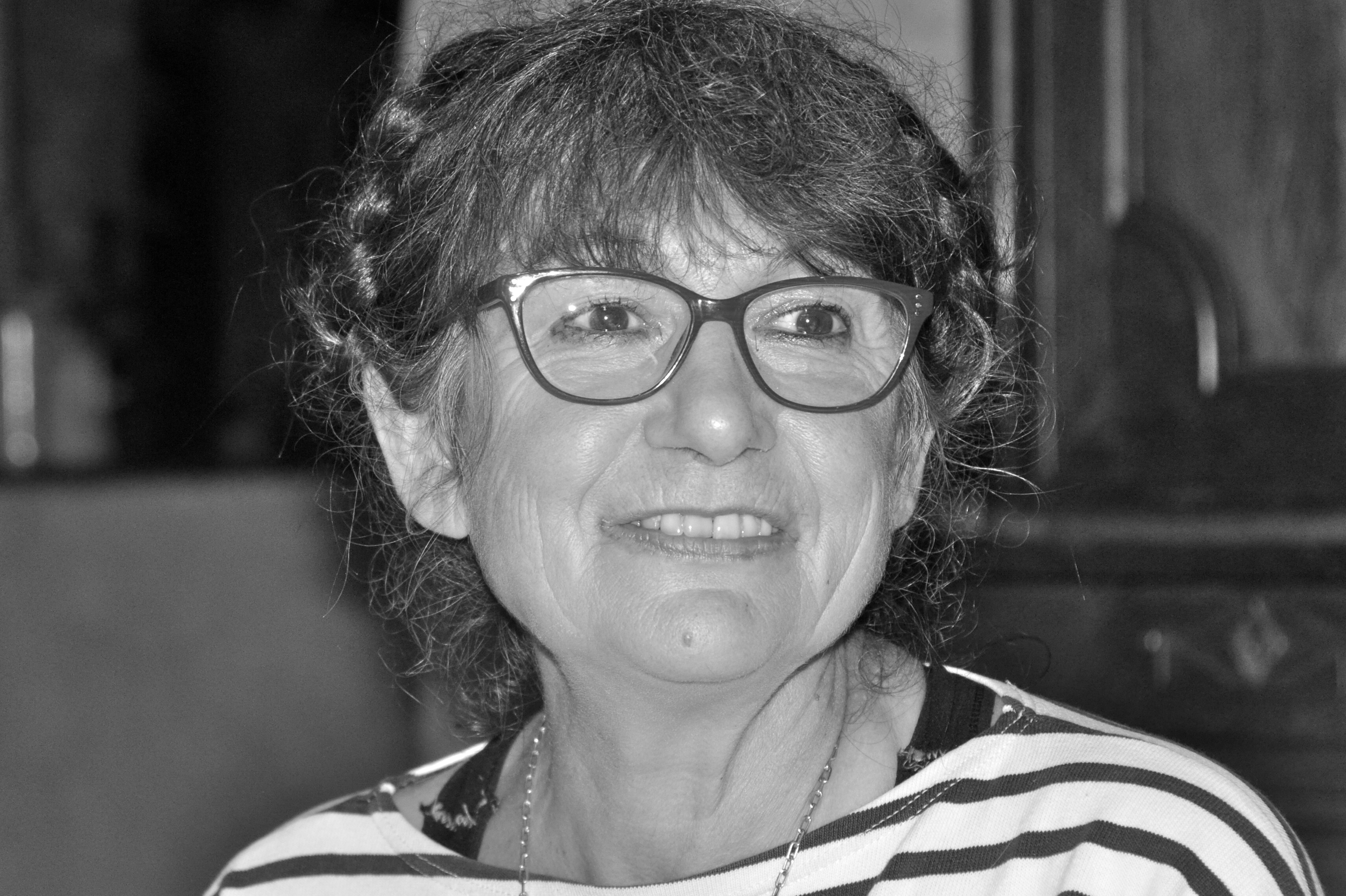
- Born: Joëlle Maury; 10 August 1952; Alençon, France
- Died: 19 November 2022 (aged 70); Caen, France
- Occupation: Writer

Joëlle Guillais (née Maury; 10 August 1952 – 19 November 2022) was a French writer.

== Biography ==
Originally from Alençon, Guillais earned a doctoral degree in history. In 1988, she published La Berthe with Plon, which was described by Michelle Perrot in Libération as "an ethnological document of exceptional quality, as well as a story of great intensity". In 1997, she published the story Agnès E, which sought to give visibility to women's prisons at a time when little attention was given to the affairs of prisoners. In 2008, she wrote and published La pesticide, an avant-garde dystopian novel which covered the dangerous effect of pesticides on human health, for which she received harassment from farmers following its publication.

Guillais directed "Mot A Mot" writing workshops in Paris and Saint-Cyr-la-Rosière. She collaborated with Laurence Verdier to publish a collection of 23 short stories titled 23 mecs comme ça, which reflected male-female relations in contemporary society. In 2019, she published Matins de fer, a novel inspired by the death of three young Romanis in a traffic collision on the A7 autoroute in La Castellane. She worked as a portrait painter for the magazine Pays du Perche after having written several columns for the HuffPost.

Guillais died following a stroke in Caen, on 19 November 2022, at the age of 70.

== Publications ==
- Les grisettes ou l’imaginaire amoureux au 19e siècle (1985)
- La Chair de l'autre : le crime passionnel au XIXe siècle (1986)
- La Berthe (1991)
- Agnès E. (1997)
- La ferme des orages (1999)
- Les Champs de la colère : roman (1999)
- La Prime aux loups (2000)
- La Teinturerie (2002)
- Barbie Rousse, sujet tabou (2003)
- Les chemins des mots (2004)
- Les causeuses d'Hérouville (2005)
- Mauvaises nouvelles littéraires (2006)
- La Pesticide (2008)
- 23 Mecs comme ça (2017)
- Matins de fer (2019)
