= Silvers-Dudley Prize =

American literary award

The Silvers-Dudley Prize is an American literary award established in 2021 and presented by the Robert B. Silvers Foundation. Three prizes are awarded each year: the Robert B. Silvers Prize for Literary Criticism, the Grace Dudley Prize for Arts Writing, and the Robert B. Silvers Prize for Journalism.

== Award details ==
The Silver-Dudley Prize is named after the late Robert B. Silvers, long-time editor of The New York Review of Books, and his partner, the late Lady Grace Dudley. Prize recipients receive between $15,000 and $30,000.

Daniel Mendelsohn, director of the Robert B. Silvers Foundation, explained the awards, saying, “These prizes richly reward a kind of writing that has long been under-recognized in the economy of literary prize-giving—long-form criticism, the intellectual essay, and arts writing—along with the penetrating journalism that Bob nurtured at the New York Review. In his will, Bob stipulated that the Foundation work to ‘support writers’; with these new prizes, we like to think we’re doing just that.”

== Recipients ==
Silvers-Dudley Prize recipients
Year	Award	Honoree	Ref.
2022	Robert B. Silvers Prize for Literary Criticism	Elaine Blair	
2022	Robert B. Silvers Prize for Literary Criticism	Merve Emre	
2022	Robert B. Silvers Prize for Literary Criticism	Becca Rothfeld	
2022	Grace Dudley Prize for Arts Writing	Vinson Cunningham	
2022	Grace Dudley Prize for Arts Writing	Jason Farago	
2022	Grace Dudley Prize for Arts Writing	Ingrid Rowland	
2022	Robert B. Silvers Prize for Journalism	Alma Guillermoprieto	
2022	Robert B. Silvers Prize for Journalism	Nesrine Malik	
2022	Robert B. Silvers Prize for Journalism	Thomas Meaney	
2023	Robert B. Silvers Prize for Literary Criticism	Parul Sehgal	
2023	Robert B. Silvers Prize for Literary Criticism	Ryan Ruby	
2023	Grace Dudley Prize for Arts Writing	T.J. Clark	
2023	Grace Dudley Prize for Arts Writing	Tausif Noor	
2023	Robert B. Silvers Prize for Journalism	Timothy Snyder	
2023	Robert B. Silvers Prize for Journalism	Caitlin Dickerson	
2024	Robert B. Silvers Prize for Literary Criticism	Marina Warner	
2024	Robert B. Silvers Prize for Literary Criticism	Jennifer Wilson	
2024	Grace Dudley Prize for Arts Writing	Svetlana Alpers	
2024	Grace Dudley Prize for Arts Writing	Harmony Holiday	
2024	Robert B. Silvers Prize for Journalism	Fintan O'Toole	
2024	Robert B. Silvers Prize for Journalism	Krithika Varagur	
2025	Robert B. Silvers Prize for Literary Criticism	Louis Menand	
2025	Robert B. Silvers Prize for Literary Criticism	Christopher Tayler	
2025	Grace Dudley Prize for Arts Writing	Judith Thurman	
2025	Grace Dudley Prize for Arts Writing	Helen Shaw	
2025	Robert B. Silvers Prize for Journalism	William Finnegan	
2025	Robert B. Silvers Prize for Journalism	Gary Younge	
