= The Ivory Key =

2022 young adult fantasy novel by Akshaya Raman

- First edition
- Author: Akshaya Raman
- Language: English
- Genre: Young adult, Fantasy
- Publisher: HarperCollins, Hot Key Books
- Publication date: January 4, 2022
- Publication place: India/United States
- Pages: 384
- ISBN: 978-0-358-46833-2

The Ivory Key is a 2022 young adult fantasy novel by Indian American writer Akshaya Raman. Raman's debut novel inspired by Indian culture and mythology was published on 4 January 2022 by HarperCollins as the first book in a planned duology and follows four siblings as the embark on a journey to find the Ivory Key, a magical artefact capable of providing magic.

== Plot ==
Set in the world of Ashoka, magic is an essential resource mined from quarries and the kingdom's largest export. As long as neighboring kingdoms believe Ashoka's supply is endless, it keeps war at bay, but the reserves are running low.

After the Maharani is assassinated, her four children, Vira, Ronak, Kaleb and Riya work together to find the Ivory Key, said to unlock a new source of magic. Each sibling, however, has their own motives.

Vira wishes to use the key to continue her mother's legacy, Ronak plans to sell it to the highest bidder, Kaleb wants to use it to prove his innocence after being accused of killing the Maharani and Riya needs it to show her loyalty to the Ravens, a group of rebels. The four siblings will have to work together or else they risk losing everything they worked for.

== Reception ==
The book was listed among the list of the most anticipated books of January 2022 by several magazines and literary websites including Polygon, PopSugar, Book Riot, BuzzFeed and Reactor Magazine.

The novel received positive reviews from critics. Kirkus Reviews notes that the novel "Skillfully weaves together political intrigue, complex sibling relationships, and magic". Publishers Weekly praised "the richly described worldbuilding, tight plot, and moderate doses of romance" calling it "a complex and layered narrative".

Booklist described the novel as "a dream for seekers of character-driven stories," The Guardian called it "Book one of an epic fantasy duology layered with Indian folklore and traditions."
