= Things We Found When the Water Went Down =

2022 novel by Tegan Nia Swanson

- Cover of the first edition
- Author: Tegan Nia Swanson
- Cover artist: Dana Li
- Language: English
- Genre: Literary fiction
- Published: 2022 (Catapult)
- Publication date: December 6, 2022
- Publication place: United States
- Pages: 256 (paperback)
- ISBN: 9781646221707

Things We Found When the Water Went Down is a literary fiction novel by Tegan Nia Swanson. Published on December 6, 2022, it is Swanson's first novel.

== Plot ==
Marietta Abernathy is an environmental activist and recluse living in the fictional town of Beau Caelais. When Hugo Mitchum, a coal miner, is found murdered, Abernathy is named the number one suspect by the authorities. Abernathy herself quickly disappears, however, and her daughter Lena starts researching her mother's life and activism to try and find her.

== Development history ==
Swanson is a transformative justice activist and works with victims of abuse. Things We Found When the Water Went Down was developed out of her experience, exploring themes of grief, abuse, and trauma. Describing the novel's genesis, Swanson said that:

I was living in Iowa in grad school, which felt like a place that was kind of devoid of water; it felt very dry. I was both literally and metaphorically thirsty, and I felt a little claustrophobic and maybe even water sick. I started thinking about what it would mean to embody being so impacted by water, or lack thereof or too much of it.

=== Publication history ===
Things We Found When the Water Went Down was published on December 6, 2022, by Catapult.

== Reception ==
Foreword Reviews praised Swanson's prose and the unique format of the book, which combined journal entries, police interview transcripts, and artwork. Dana Dunham, writing in The Chicago Review of Books, said that Swanson was able to combine realistic writing with "a profound metaphorical exploration of trauma." Publishers Weekly praised the novel for containing compelling characters and noted the undertones of horror throughout the book. Kirkus Reviews praised Swanson's handling of the form shifts throughout the book and positively compared Swanson's writing to the visual art of Joseph Cornell. Booklist's Kathy Sexton was slightly more critical, writing that "the mash of genres doesn't always make for suspenseful reading" but recommended the novel for fans of experimental fiction.
