= Beaverland =

2022 non-fiction book by Leila Philip

Beaverland: How One Weird Rodent Made America
- Author: Leila Philip
- Language: English
- Genre: Non-fiction
- Publisher: Twelve Books
- Publication date: December 6, 2022
- ISBN: 9781538755198

Beaverland: How One Weird Rodent Made America is a non-fiction book written by Leila Philip published on December 6, 2022 by Twelve Books.

== Overview ==
Beaverland is a non-fiction book describing the behavior, history, and cultural significance of the North American beaver. Philip discusses the relationship between beavers and humans throughout history with a focus on Indigenous cultures and the American westward expansion. The title, Beaverland, is an allusion to Philip's argument that "Before 1600, all of the continent from west to east, save a few desert sections, had stretched out as one great Beaverland".

== Reception ==
Beaverland received positive reviews from critics. Kate Bellody reviewed the book for Library Journal and positively described the level of detail it gave to beaver activity, along with praising Philip for weaving discussion of "Indigenous wisdom" throughout the book. Richard Adams Carey, writing in The Wall Street Journal, described Beaverland as being "in parts a memoir, a local and national history, and a sort of quest narrative." Kirkus Reviews noted the large amount of field research conducted by Philip while writing the book, while Publishers Weekly praised Philip's prose and described the book as a "triumph of popular nature writing." Beaverland also received positive reviews in The Washington Post, Scientific American, and Sierra.
