= Begoña Huertas =

Spanish writer (1965–2022)

- Born: 4 August 1965; Gijón, Spain
- Died: 25 December 2022 (aged 57); Madrid, Spain
- Occupations: novelist, journalist

Begoña Huertas Uhagón (1965–2022) was a Spanish writer and journalist. She won the Casa de las Américas Prize for her essay Ensayo de un cambio: la narrativa cubana en la década de los 80.

== Biography ==
Begoña Huertas was born on 4 August 1965 in Gijón. She completed her doctorate in Spanish philology at the Autonomous University of Madrid, specializing in Latin American literature. Huertas was a visiting lecturer at University of Michigan, then continued as a research fellow at the University of Barcelona.

Huertas worked as an editor at various publishing houses and also taught creative writing at the Autonomous University of Madrid. She wrote for Spanish cultural magazines and in 2010–2012 wrote opinion pieces for the Público, later becoming a columnist for ElDiario.es.

In 1993, Huertas won the Casa de las Américas Prize for the essay Ensayo de un cambio: la narrativa cubana en la década de los 80. She then published a short story collection called A tragos (1996) and continued writing fiction with a number of novels, such as Una noche en Amalfi which was compared by RTVE to the works of Patricia Highsmith. Her last novel, El sótano, was published posthumously by Editorial Anagrama in 2023. Writing for El País, Carlos Zanón called it a "beautiful testament", while Anna María Iglesia described it in El Mundo as a "wonderful invitation to reflect on the uncertainty of life and writing".

Huertas died on 25 December 2022, in Madrid.

== Works ==
=== Essays ===
- Ensayo de un cambio: la narrativa cubana en la década de los 80, 1994

=== Short story collections ===
- A tragos, 1996

=== Novels ===
- Déjenme dormir en paz, 1998
- Por eso envejecemos tan deprisa, 2001
- En el fondo. Pide una copa paga Proust, 2009
- Una noche en Amalfi, 2012
- El desconcierto, 2017
- El sótano, 2023
