= Claude Mossé =

French historian (1924–2022)

- Born: 24 December 1924; Paris, France
- Died: 12 December 2022 (aged 97); Draveil, France
- Scientific career
- Fields: History of Ancient Greece

Claude Mossé (24 December 1924 – 12 December 2022) was a French historian specializing in the history of Ancient Greece.

== Biography ==
Mossé was born in Paris on 24 December 1924, as the daughter of a wine merchant. She was the sister of Eliane Mossé, researcher in macroeconomics, and Arlette Mosse, clinical nutritionist. In the winter of 1941, during World War II and aged 16, she first read a text on liberty and democracy by Demosthenes; since then, she dedicated her life to Greek history, never having married or having any children.

Her favourite historical subject was 4th century BCE Athens. Mossé belonged to the same school of historical thought with Jean-Pierre Vernant and Pierre Vidal-Naquet. She was professor emeritus at the University of Paris VIII. Her works have been translated into many languages including English, German, Spanish, Italian, Portuguese and modern Greek.

Mossé died in Draveil, Essonne on 12 December 2022, at the age of 97.

== Selected works ==
- La Fin de la démocratie athénienne. Aspects sociaux et politiques du déclin de la cité grecque au iv^{e} siècle av. J.-C., Paris, 1962
- Le Travail en Grèce et à Rome, Paris, PUF, Que sais-je?, 1966
- Les Institutions grecques, Paris, Armand Colin, 1968
- La Tyrannie dans la Grèce antique, Paris, PUF, 1969
- La Colonisation dans l'Antiquité, Paris, Nathan, 1970
- Histoire d'une démocratie, Athènes, Paris, Le Seuil, 1971
- Histoire des doctrines politiques en Grèce, Paris, PUF, Que sais-je?, 1975
- La Femme dans la Grèce antique, Paris, Albin Michel, 1983
- La Grèce archaïque d'Homère à Eschyle, Paris, Le Seuil, 1984
- Le Procès de Socrate, Bruxelles, Complexe, 1987
- L'Antiquité dans la Révolution française, Paris, Albin Michel, 1989
- Précis d'histoire grecque. Du début du deuxième millénaire à la bataille d'Actium, with Annie Schnapp-Gourbeillon, Paris, Armand Colin, 1990
- Les Mythes Grecs, Photographs by Erich Lessing, Nathan, 1991
- Dictionnaire de la civilisation grecque, Bruxelles, Complexe, 1992
- Le Citoyen dans la Grèce antique, Paris, Nathan, 1993
- Démosthène ou les ambiguïtés de la politique, Paris, Armand Colin, 1994
- Politique et société en Grèce ancienne. Le « modèle » athénien, Paris, Aubier, 1995
- Meurtres sur l'Agora, Calmann-Lévy, 1995
- Alexandre. La destinée d'un mythe, Paris, Payot, 2001
- Périclès, l'inventeur de la démocratie, Payot, coll. biography, 2005
- Les Grecs inventent la politique, Complexe, 2005
- Sacrilèges et trahisons à Athènes, Larousse, 2009
- Au nom de la loi. Justice et politique à Athènes à l'âge classique, Payot, 2010
- Regards sur la démocratie athénienne, Perrin, 2013

== See also ==
- Classics
