= Religious profession =

Solemn admission of people into a religious order by means of public vows

A religious profession is the solemn admission of men or women into consecrated life by means of the pronouncement of religious vows, typically the evangelical counsels. It is practiced in some Christian denominations, particularly Catholicism, Evangelical Lutheranism and Anglicanism, among other Christian traditions.

== History ==
The origins of religious profession date from the time when Christians were recognized in the Church as followers after perfection in the practice of religious life. Third-century ascetics, called in Greek asketai, and in Latin confessores, were early examples of a religious profession. Eusebius of Caesarea (Church History, III, xxxvii) numbers among the ascetics the most illustrious pontiffs of the first ages, Clement of Rome, Ignatius of Antioch, Polycarp, and others. After these, in the fourth century, came the hermits and monks, followed in the 11th century by the canons regular, in the 13th century by the mendicant orders, in the 16th by the clerks regular, and lastly by the members of religious congregations.

Profession for a long time was made by clothing with the religious habit: the aspirant could personally put on the habit or receive it, with or without ceremony, from the abbot or from the bishop. This clothing laid upon him the obligation of poverty and chastity more as a natural consequence of a donation or consecration to God than as arising from formal vows, which did not exist at that time (cf. Basil of Caesarea, Regulæ fusius tractatæ resp. ad 14 interrogat. in P. G., XXXI, 949–52).

The community life, established under Schenoudi, the great disciple of St. Pachomius, added an explicit promise of fidelity to certain precepts. Benedict of Nursia added an express promise of stability, and obedience to the superior. These last promises denoted obligations created in addition to those implied by taking the habit. The first formula, which expressly mentions poverty and chastity, is that of the Constitutions of Narbonne, promulgated in 1260 by St. Bonaventure for the Friars Minor. Then the constitutions of the Minims and clerks regular expressly mention the three essential vows of the religious life, as well as those superadded on account of the special ends of their orders. This discipline is common to religious orders and congregations. Finally the regulations (Normæ) of 1901, published in explanation of the present practice of the Holy See, do not permit in new congregations any but the three essential vows of poverty, chastity, and obedience.

In the Decretal Quod votum, unic. De veto et voti redemptione (iii, 15) in 6°, Pope Boniface VIII declared authoritatively that the vow of chastity, consecrated by the reception of major orders, or by religious profession in an approved institute, created a diriment impediment to marriage. Some communities of tertiaries not belonging to an approved order were the first to introduce profession accompanied by simple vows, which is now the ordinary practice in the more recent congregations.

The Annals of the Order of St. Benedict (vol. I, p. 74) in the year 537 recognized among the Greeks three classes of religious: the novices, who wore the simple tunic; the perfect, clothed with the pallium; and the more perfect invested with the cuculla, or hood attached to a short cloak, covering the shoulders, which was considered the special emblem of the religious life. In certain monasteries of the East, a distinction was made between persons wearing the short habit, mikroschemoi, and those wearing the long habit, megaloschemoi, a distinction against which St. Theodorus the Studite protested in his epistles (I, ep. x, in P. G., XCIX, 941–2), and which is still found among the Schismatic Coptic monks (see Kathol. Missionen 1 Oct., 1910, p. 7 sqq.).

== By Christian denomination ==
=== Catholic usage ===
St. Ignatius of Loyola laid down that in the Jesuit order there should be a simple profession, followed by more or less frequent renewal of vows until such time as the candidate should be prepared for the solemn or definitive profession; this under Popes Pius IX and Leo XIII has become the common law of all religious orders.

In 1963, the fathers of the Second Vatican Council called for "a rite of religious profession and renewal of vows" to be drawn up, which was to demonstrate "greater unity, sobriety, and dignity" than had been provided for in the versions previously in use. In the Council's Dogmatic Constitution on the Church, they also noted the importance of the liturgical setting for religious profession, where

The Church itself, by the authority given to it by God, accepts the vows of the newly professed. It begs aid and grace from God for them by its public prayer. It commends them to God, imparts a spiritual blessing on them and accompanies their self-offering by the Eucharistic sacrifice.

The 1983 Code of Canon Law defines the term in relation to members of religious institutes as follows:

By religious profession members make a public vow to observe the three evangelical counsels. Through the ministry of the Church they are consecrated to God, and are incorporated into the institute, with the rights and duties defined by law.

Catholic canon law also recognizes public profession of the evangelical counsels on the part of Christians who live the eremitic or anchoritic life without being members of a religious institute:

A hermit is recognized in the law as one dedicated to God in a consecrated life if he or she publicly professes the three evangelical counsels, confirmed by a vow or other sacred bond, in the hands of the diocesan bishop and observes his or her own plan of life under his direction.

=== Evangelical Lutheran usage ===
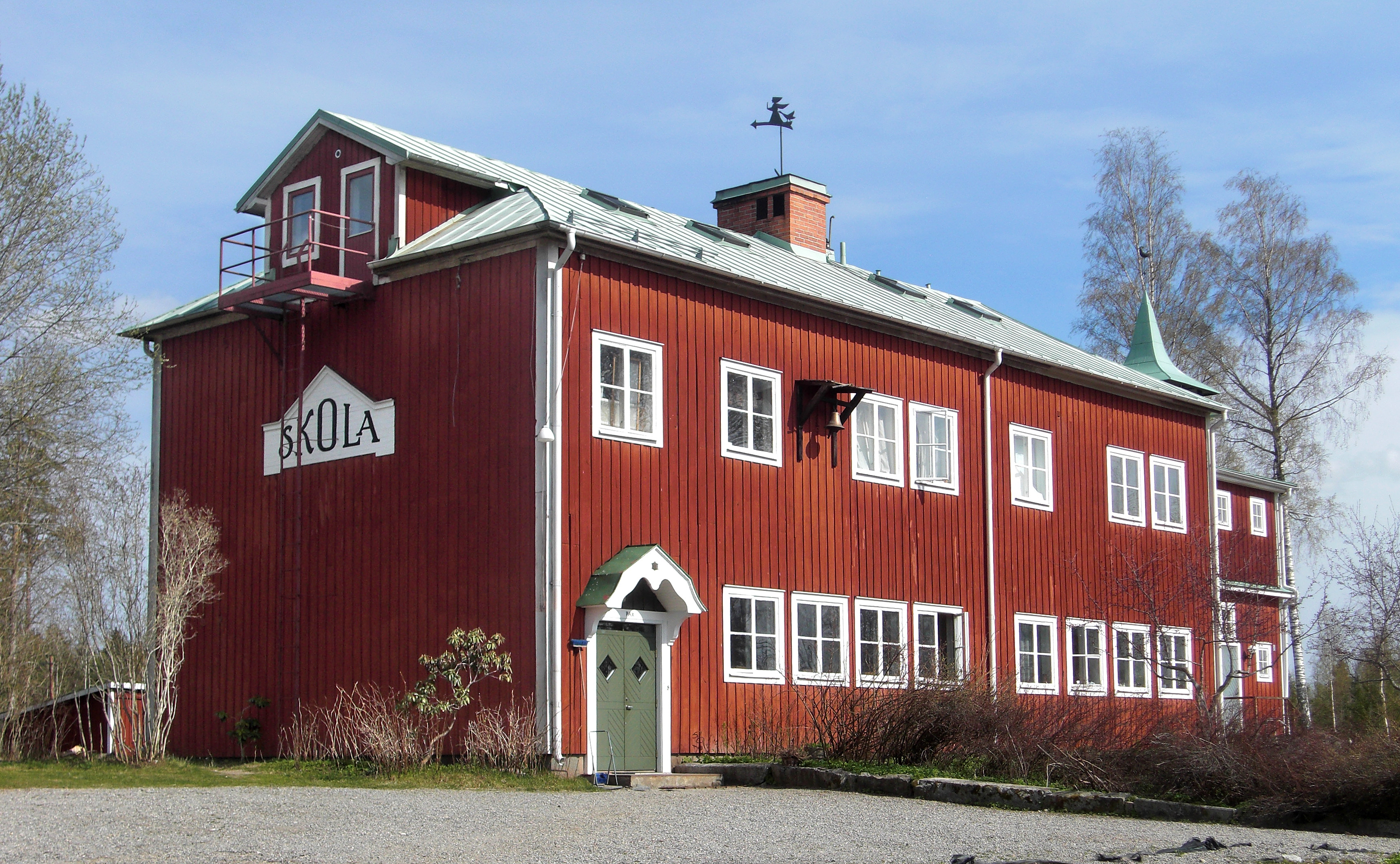
Östanbäck Evangelical Lutheran Monastery in Sweden

In Evangelical Lutheranism, those who become brothers, monks, sisters or nuns take a religious profession. For example, sisters who belong to the Daughters of Mary wear blue habit and make vows of poverty, chastity and obedience.

== Procedure ==
Religious profession can be temporary or perpetual: "Temporary profession is to be made for the period defined by the institute's own law. This period may not be less than three years nor longer than six years."

"When the period of time for which the profession was made has been completed, a religious who freely asks, and is judged suitable, is to be admitted to a renewal of profession or to perpetual profession; otherwise, the religious is to leave."

Conditions for making a temporary religious profession are a minimum age of 18 years, completion of a regular novitiate, freedom of choice on the part of the person making the profession, and acceptance by the superior after a vote by the superior's council. Additional conditions for making perpetual profession are a minimum age of 21 years and the completion of at least three years of temporary profession.

Religious profession is often associated with the granting of a religious habit, which the newly professed receives from the superior of the institute or from the bishop. Acceptance of the habit implies acceptance of the obligation of membership of the religious institute as well as the associated vows.
