= Missionary Society of Saint Thomas =

Eastern Catholic missionary organisation

The Missionary Society of St Thomas (the Apostle), abbreviated M.S.T. is an Eastern Catholic missionary organization founded in 1968 in Kerala by the Syro Malabar Catholic Church, for missionary work in "less Christian areas" in and outside of India. It was founded by Bishop Sebastian Vayalil as a society of apostolic life for men.

== Structure and statistics ==
The society is organised in three officially declared regions in southern and central India: Ujjain in Madhya Pradesh, Mandya in Karnataka and Sangli in Maharashtra; M.S.T. in the United States is an extension of the M.S.T. in Kerala. Its headquarters are Deepti Bhavan, Melampara P.O., Bharananganam, Kerala 686 594, India.

There are 300 priests working as full-time members of the society, all of them members of the Syro Malabar Church, which has its own Chaldean or Syro-Oriental Rite (different from Rome's own Latin rite), which has its own major archbishop (like a patriarch, but ranking below). There are also a few priests working in other continents as pastors.

=== The General Assembly 2008 ===
The 8th Ordinary General Assembly of the Missionary Society of St Thomas the Apostle began on 14 May 2008 at its Central House, Melampara, Bharananganam. The supreme representative body of the society was formally concluded on 24 May at 3:30 p.m. The new members of the General Council elected by the General Assembly to guide the society for the next five years are the following, with offices and portfolios assigned:

- James Athikalam - Director General
- Paul Mudathotty - Vice Director General (First Councillor) - Formation and Ongoing Formation
- Thomas Chirackal - Second Councillor - Education and Social Apostolate
- Antony Perumanoor - Third Councillor - Secretary General
- Mathew Elavumkal - Fourth Councillor - Priests' Welfare and Communion
- Kurian Kochettonnil - Treasurer General - Communication and Mission Animation

=== The General Assembly 2013 ===
- Kurian Ammanathukunnel - Director General
- Jose Palakeel - Vice Director General - Formation
- Jose Aryankalayil - Councillor - Secretary General
- Thomas Chenganariparambil - Education and Social Apostolate, Mission Animation
- George Koorumullumpurayidam - Priests' Welfare and Communion
- Kuriakose Kunnel- Treasurer General

== History ==
The Missionary Society of St Thomas the Apostle was formally inaugurated on 22 February 1968.

=== Founder ===
Who is the real founder of MST has always been a point of debate. One of the founding members was the Bishop of Pala Sebastian Vayalil.

Joseph Maliparampil writes, "St Thomas Missionary Society is the fruition of a long cherished vision of the 'missionary Bishop', Mar Sebastian Vayalil that the SyroMalabar Church should have an association of missionaries". It was Bishop Vayalil who visualized it as an institute of the Church and gave concrete form to it with the help of his priests. In the words of Cardinal Lourdusamy, it was in 1962 "that the Missionary Society of St Thomas the Apostle began to take shape in the vision of late Mar Sebastian Vayalil, then Bishop of Palai". The initiatives taken by him and the cooperation and support extended by other prelates of the Church really paved the way for the foundation of the society. In the report of the director general presented at the General Assembly of 19th we read, "it is the Bishop of Palai who took initiatives on his own accord and on behalf of the Hierarchy to give shape to this missionary project, encouraged as he was by the Pope himself and the Cardinal Prefects of the Sacred Congregations of the Oriental Churches and Propaganda Fide".

During the ad limina visit of 1960 Vayalil met Pope John XXIII and apprised him of the plan to begin an association to canalize the vocations of the Syro-Malabar Church. He then consulted with the cardinals of the Oriental Congregation and Propaganda Fide. Back home, he put forward his plan in the Syro Malabar Bishop's Conference. The conference extended its support. The bishop was in Rome again in 1961 and 1962 and received expert advice from the congregations about the nature of the society. The next stage was consultation with the priests of the diocese. He held meetings with the likeminded priests of the diocese and discussed with them the future of the proposed society. A union was formed with likeminded priests on 22 January 1965. The bishop canonically erected the M.S.T. on 22 February at Melampara.

=== Initial idea ===
In the 1950s there was a sudden boost in the number of young men of the Syro Malabar Church going to do missionary work in India and abroad. Different factors had contributed to this sudden burst in missionary vocations in the Church. The hierarchy of the Syro-Malabar Church had by then been established and was well in control. Many favourable conditions such as the establishment of the Mission League, starting Mission Home, and beginning of the magazine Prekshithakeralam from Mangalapuaha Seminary also played a vital role in this missionary awakening. It was in this background that Sebastian Vayalil while preparing for the ad limina visit of 1960 came across the idea of beginning an association of priests of the Syro-Malabar Church to canalize the missionary vocations. Kurian Vanchipurackal and John Perumattam were entrusted with the task of preparing the report of the diocese to be presented to the Holy See. The report clearly was an eye opener to the bishop to see that many young men of the diocese had to change their rite to become missionaries. It was the immediate reason why the bishop began to think about forming a missionary association and he included this project also in the ad limina report.

=== Development ===
In Rome the idea of a missionary association got more clarity. While presenting his report to Pope John XXIII, the bishop informed him of the plan to begin an association for mission work. Welcoming the idea, the pope asked the bishop to consult with the experts in the Roman Congregation for the Eastern Churches and missionary Propaganda Fide. These congregations (Vatican 'ministerial' departments) suggested the bishop to begin a missionary society instead of a religious congregation, as there had been several already in India. Thus the idea about the missionary association got more clear with the discussions held at Rome

=== Support of the Syro-Malabar hierarchy ===
Coming back from the ad limina visit, Mar Vayalil proposed in an official meeting of the Syro-Malabar Bishop's Conference the plan for a missionary society for the Church: "It should be a common society of the whole Malabar church to be erected by the hierarchy and placed under it". The bishops approved the step and promised their support. They asked Vayalil to take up responsibility as there were more vocations in the diocese of Palai.

=== Priests of the diocese get involved ===
The bishop now began official consultation with his priests who were interested in the idea, convening a meeting at 3:00 pm on 25 March 1963 at the Bishop's House. Philip Valiyil (V.G), Mathew Kottarathumially (Chancellor), Joseph Maliparampil, Abraham Kaipanplackal, Kurian Vanchipurackal, Sebastian Pottanany, Abraham Ettackakunnel, Francis Kandathil and John Perumattam attended the meeting. However the meeting was not able to reach a conclusion about the exact nature of the proposed institute. A committee was constituted to draft the statutes of the future society. Kurian Vanchipurackal and John Perumattam were the members of that committee.

A second meeting of the priests was convened on 3 March 1964. Its main purpose was to discuss the draft constitution. Philip Valiyil, Mathew Kottarathumially, Thomas Purayidom, Joseph Maliparampil, Abraham Ettackakunnel, Francis Kandathil, Sebastian Pottanany, Kuriakose Mampuzha, Alexander Cherukarakunnel, Joseph Nadayath, Jacob Maliekal, T.C. Joseph, Jacob Plathottam and John Perumattam were the participants this time. Bishop Mar Vayalil later got the permission of the Bishop's Conference to submit the draft to the Holy See. The draft was sent to Rome on 14 March 1964.

=== Pious Union comes into being ===
A third meeting of the priests was convened on 22 January 1965. The Bishop informed the members of the commission he had to start and organize the missionary institute as a Pious Union of the diocesan clergy for mission work. Nine out of the twenty-five priests present inscribed their names as the members of the Pious Union : Joseph Maliparampil, Abraham Kaipanpiackal, Abraham Ettackakunnel, Augustine Puthenpura, Francis Kandathil, George Kuahikandam, Joseph Puthenpura, Paul Naickarakudy and John Perumattam.

Sebastian Vayalil was unanimously chosen as the president of the Pious Union and John Perumattam as the secretary and treasurer.

Another meeting was held at the Bishop's House on 8–9 March 1965. The participants were the members of the Pious Union and the priests of the bishop's House. The meeting decided to send a circular to the priests of the diocese informing them of the nature and purpose of the Pious Union. Meanwhile, the Bishop admitted nine students destined for the future missionary society to the Good Shepherd Minor Seminary at Palai : Joseph Puthuppally, Thomas Varakil, Thomas Parayady, Sebastian Varikatt, Joseph Ancheril, Mathew Karipath, Joseph Maramattam, Kurian Ammanathukunnel and Mathew Valanatt. Meanwhile, some more priests had joined the Pious Union: Thomas Ayathamattam, Kurain Valiamangalam, Joseph Puthiath, Zahcharias Thudipara, Thomas Chellantahra and Joseph Palackatukunnel.

The statutes for the missionary society was approved by the Holy See on 13 June 1967. Bishop Vayalil was authorized to erect the society and promulgate the statutes. An extraordinary meeting of those who were interested in the mission work was held on 26 October 1967.

Invitation was sent to all priests of the Palai diocese and 80 of them attended. In the meeting the Bishop explained all the steps he had so far taken towards the forming a missionary society on behalf of the Archbishops and Bishops of the Syro-Malabar Church.

All present whole-heartedly supported the idea and promised their full cooperation. Dr C.T. Kottaram on behalf of all the priests present offered one day's Holy Mass for this purpose. After the meeting a few more priests joined the Pious Union. They were George Kuthivalachel, Jacob Plathottam, John Kadookunnel, Joseph Ayathamattam, Joseph Karikilamthadam, John Plackeel, Abraham Kaniampady, Joseph Kochayyankanal, Sebastian Pottanany, and Abraham Parappuram.

=== MST comes into being ===
The Missionary Society of St Thomas the apostle was formally erected and its Constitution was promulgated on 22 February 1968 by Bishop Sebastian Vayalil in a function presided over by Cardinal Maxmilian de Furstenburg. The foundation stone for the Central House of the society was also laid on that day.

=== The society begins functioning ===
By the special faculty obtained from the Holy See, Sebastian Vayalil, on 16 July 1968, appointed John Perumattam the first Director General of the society. Joseph Maliparampil, Joseph Mattam, Abraham Ettackakunnel, and John Kadookunnel were appointed Councilors. Thus the society began functioning, the above five members making their promise in the presence of Vayalil. Eleven more members were incorporated immediately and from among them John Plackeel and Sebastian Pottanany were elected Secretary General and Treasurer General respectively. The first members of the society were the following: John Perumattam, Joseph Maliparampil, Joseph Mattam, Abraham Ettackakunnel, John Kadookkunnel, John Plackeel, Sebastian Pottanany, Augustine Puthenpura, George Kuthivalachel, Kurian Valiamangalam, Zacharias Thudipara, Joseph Ayathamttam, Jacob Plathottam, Abraham Parappuram, George Kuzhikandam, and Abraham Porunnoly. Francis Kandathil and Paul Naickarakudy, as they were already sent to Ujjain, could not make their promise of incorporation on that day. Perumattam tendered resignation as he became the Exarch of Ujjain, Joseph Maliparampil was nominated and appointed as the Director General by the Bishop of Palai.

=== Beginning of the House at Ampara ===
A few acres of land was ready procured at Melampara at the initiative of Ettackakunnel, Plathottam Mathunni Mathunni (2 acres) and Koottarappillil Chacko (one acre) and other generous people donated a major portion of it. Eight acres of land was purchased using the fund provided by the Holy See. The House of the society which was to become the headquarters of MST, started to function at Ampara on 20 January 1969. That was the reason why Deepti College used to celebrate its Home Day on this day for a long time. Augustine Puthenpura, who was the Vicar of Adivaram was nominated as the first Superior of the House. Sebastian Pottanany and John Plackeel were the other inmates of the House.

Deepti Bhavan, which was constructed under the supervision of Sebastian Pottannany according to the plan drawn by Larry Baker, was inaugurated on 30 December 1972 by Cardinal Joseph Parekkattil.

=== Starting of Deepti College ===
Once the society began to function, the next thought was of starting the Minor Seminary. The most important question was where to begin it. "All possible houses for rent in and around Bharanganam were considered. Suggestion came to start the Minor Seminary at the Sea View Estate and it was almost considered possible. Information came from Rev. Fr Mathew Kattady that he was ready to conduct the Minor Seminary in Trivandrum and find means to run it till buildings becocme ready at Ampara. But on March 11, when all gathered at Bishop's House (First General Assembly), contrary to all calculations, it was decided to start the Minor Seminary that year itself at Ampara and to erect building ad hoc borrowing the necessary fund from any source". Thus Deepti College, the Minor Seminary of MST, officially came into being on 31 August 1969 with Sebastian Thuruthel as Rector and Joseph Thaiparampil as Spiritual Father. On 1 September 1969 classes began with 35 students.

Right from the beginning of the attempts to form a missionary institute of the Syro-Malabar Church there is one idea running through: the Sons of the Christians of St Thomas must be able to do evangelization outside Kerala in their own rite. That is why Bishop Vayalil always had this preoccupation of forming an institute as a common society of the whole Syro-Malabar Church. Duraisamy Simon Cardinal Lourdusamy once termed MST "as an institution recognized as an expression of the apostolic vocation of the Syro-Malabar Church and permitting the fulfilment of the missionary aspirations of individual members of this Church". There are mainly two reasons why MST can be qualified as the missionary wing of the Syro-Malabar Church.

== Prelates from the congregation ==
(all native Indians)

Alive (2018)

- Sebastian Vadakel, Bishop of Syro-Malabar Catholic Eparchy of Ujjain (India) (1998.04.04 – ...)
- Bishop James Athikalam, Bishop of Syro-Malabar Catholic Eparchy of Sagar (India) (2018.01.12 – ...)

Deceased

- John Perumattam, Bishop emeritus of above Ujjain of the Syro-Malabars (India) (1977.02.26 – 1998.04.04), died 2011

== See also ==
- Consecrated life
- Institutes of consecrated life
- Religious institute (Catholic)
- Secular institute
- Vocational Discernment in the Catholic Church

== Sources and External links ==
- Missionary Society of St Thomas the Apostle official website
- GCatholic
- Missionary Society of St Thomas the Apostle in USA
