= Sisters of the Holy Spirit at Alsike Convent =

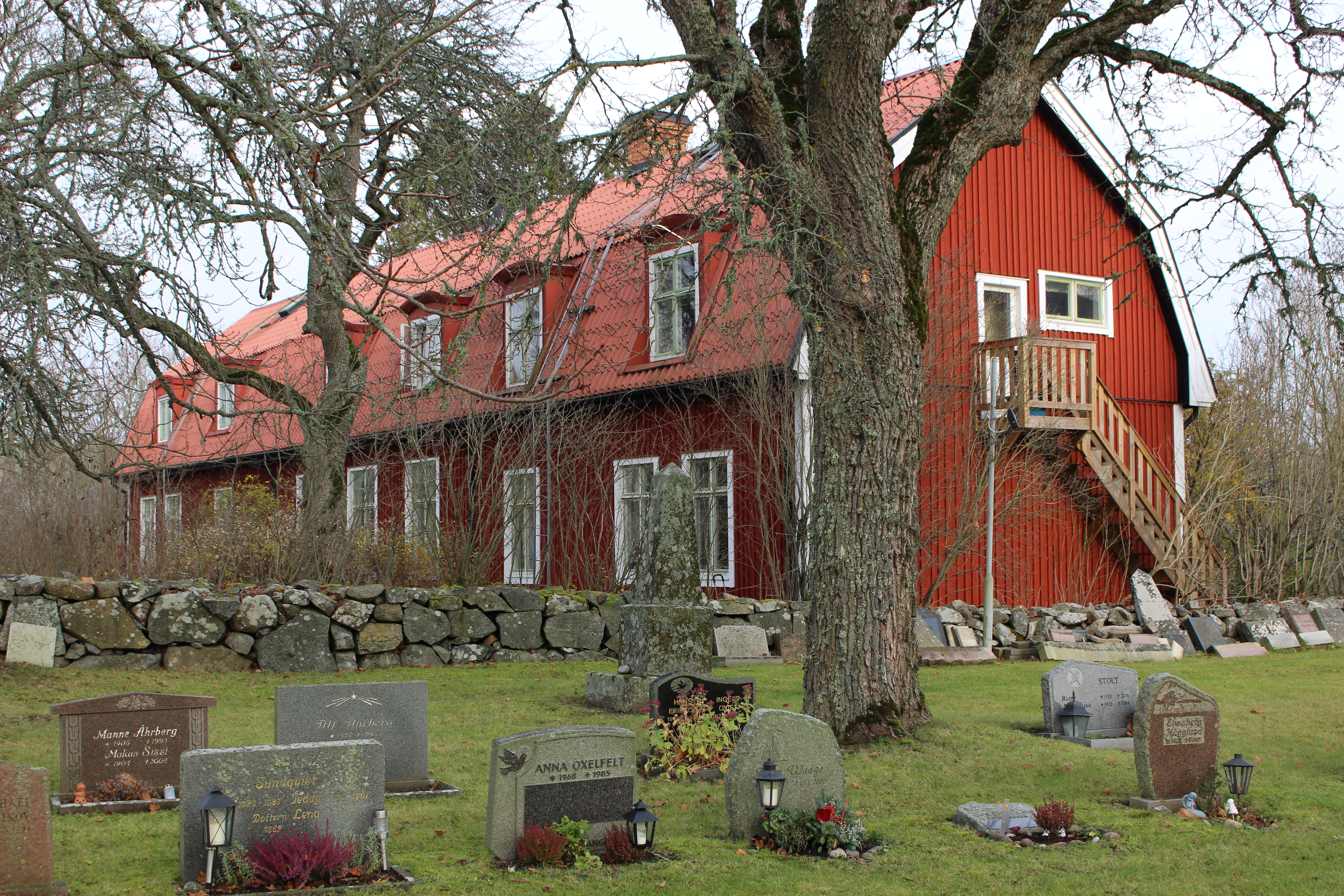
The churchyard of Alsike Convent

The Sisters of the Holy Spirit (Swedish: Helgeandssystrarna) is an Evangelical-Lutheran monastic religious order of nuns of the Church of Sweden, who inhabit Alsike Convent (Swedish: Alsike kloster) in Uppsala County, Sweden. Attached to the convent is Alsike Evangelical Lutheran Church and near the convent is an Evangelical-Lutheran hermitage. The religious habit of The Sisters of the Holy Spirit includes a dove with a cross. The seven canonical hours are prayed daily at Alsike Convent. The nuns are currently three in number. In the Alsike Church, the High Mass is celebrated every Lord's Day (Sunday).

== History ==
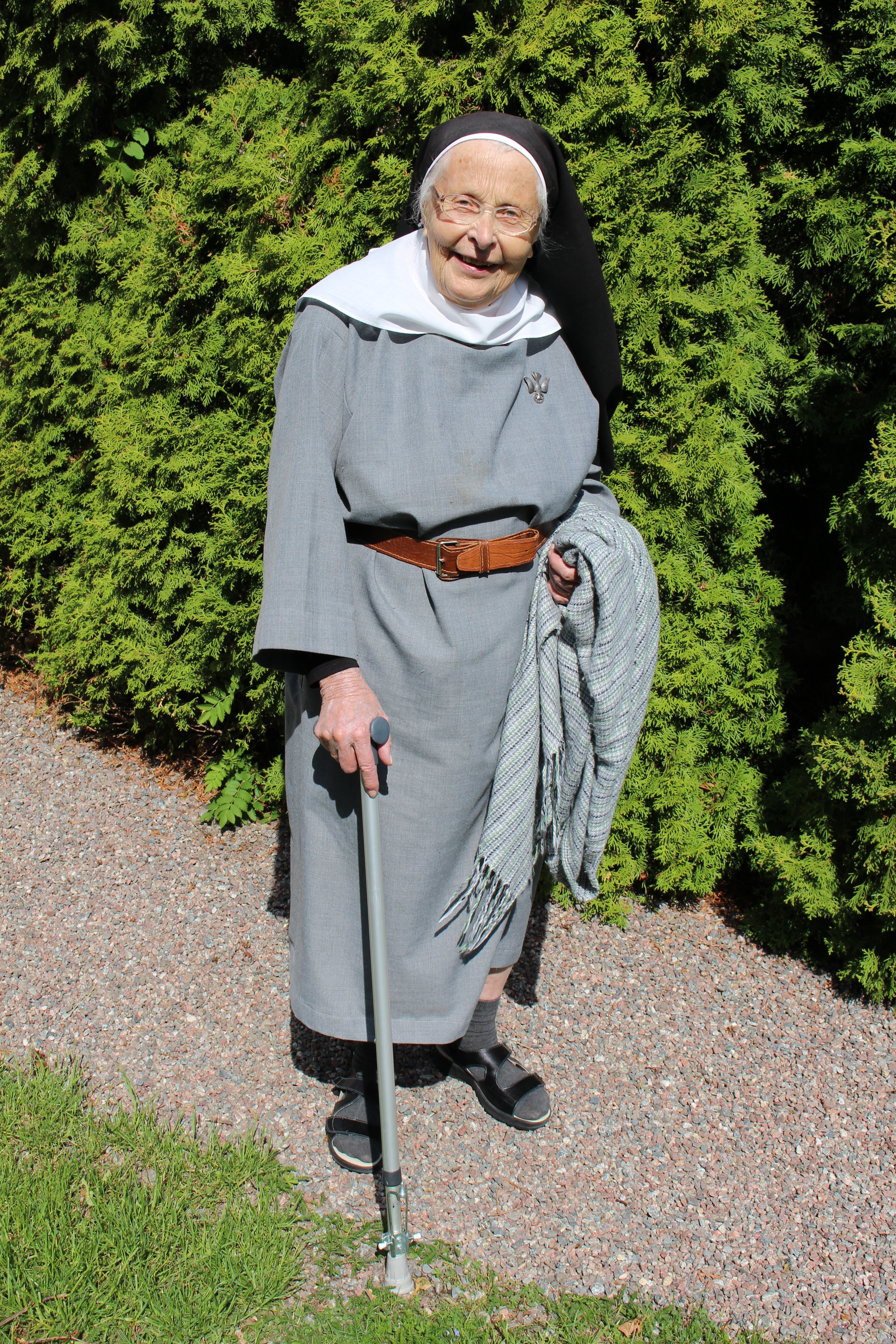
The Evangelical-Lutheran nuns of the Order of the Holy Spirit wear a grey habit with a dove lapel pin (the nuns are standing in the rear of this procession at Alsike Church). Depicted is Sr. Marianne Nordström, who founded Alsike Convent.

The Sisters of the Holy Spirit was founded by Sr. Marianne Nordström and Sr. Ella Perssonin 1954, with the convent being attached to Alsike Church. The religious institute is a part of the Evangelical-Lutheran Church of Sweden and aligns itself with the Missionsprovinsen—the confessional branch of Evangelical Lutheranism. The nuns hold that at Alsike Convent "we live our monastic vocation, with a common prayer life that sustains our day".

The Sisters of the Holy Spirit have a ministry for providing food for the poor, as well as a ministry for providing sanctuary for persecuted refugees at Alsike Convent. The entrance sign of Alsike Convent references Matthew 25:35, noting that it is "sanctuary for refugees in danger".

The construction of a daughter house under the auspices of the Evangelical Lutheran Church in Kenya is being contemplated, with postulants from Kenya discerning joining consecrated life in the Sisters of the Holy Spirit.

== Gallery ==
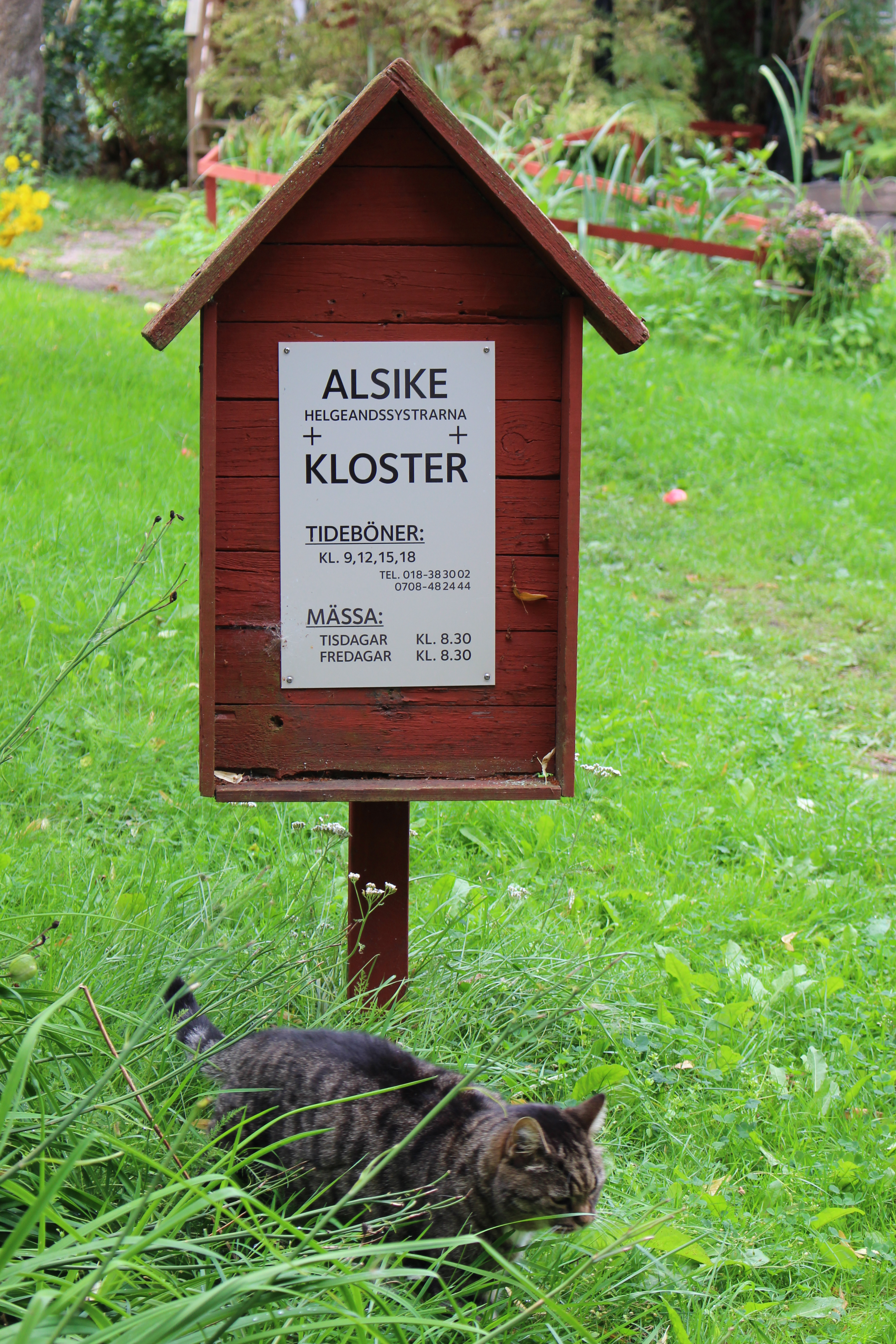
A cat belonging to The Sisters of the Holy Spirit walks in front of the sign of the convent

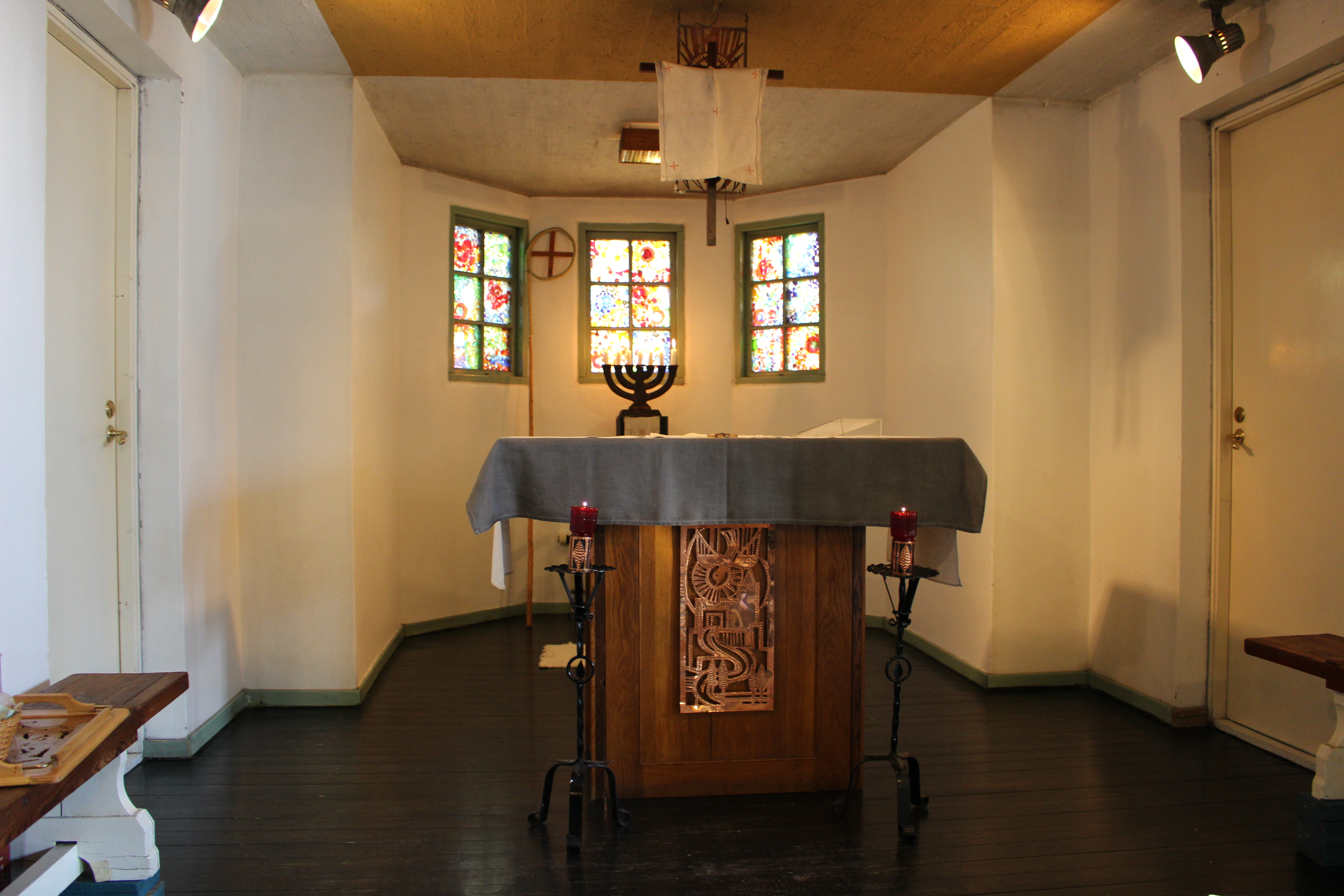
The high altar of the chapel of Alsike Convent

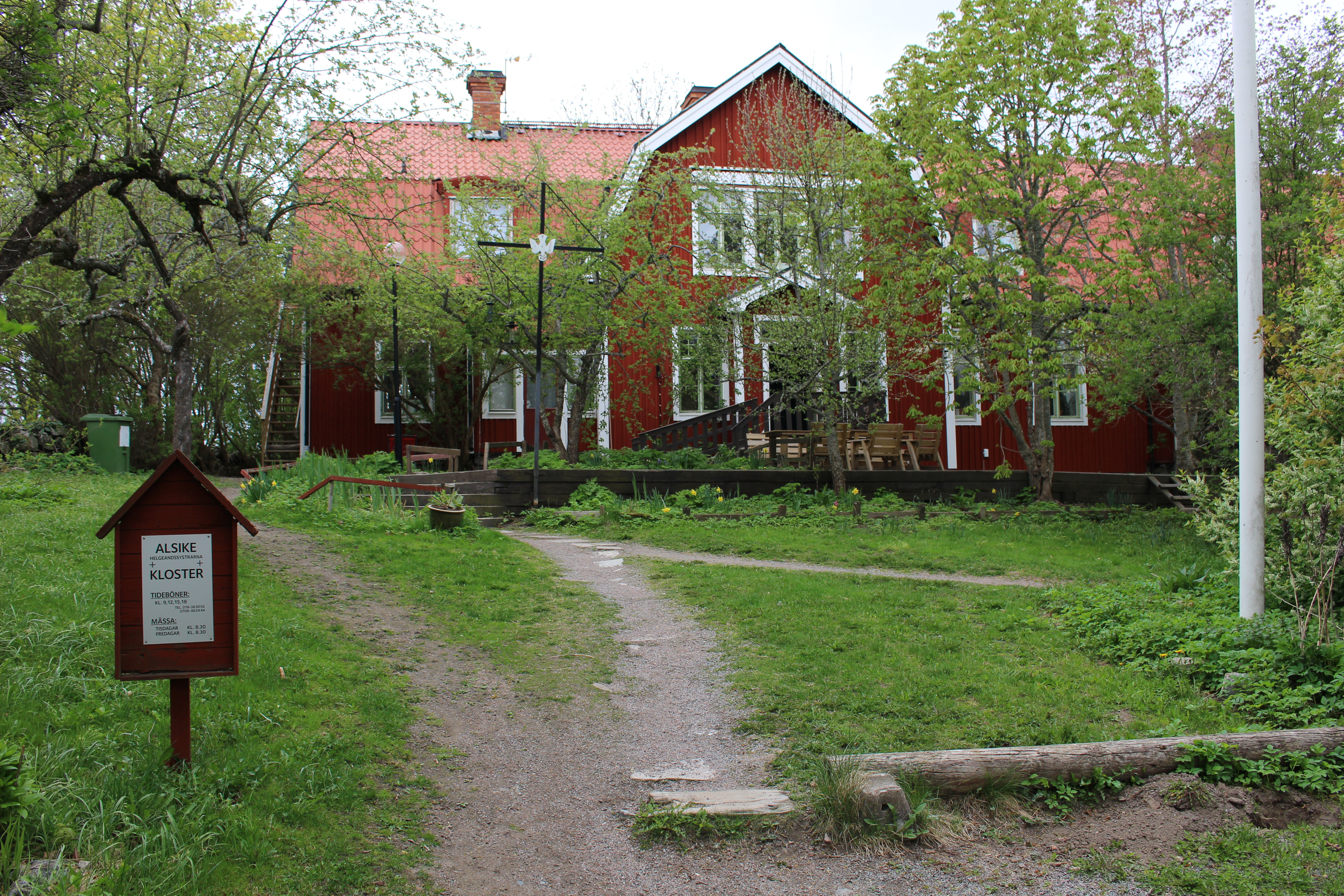
A Christian cross at the entrance of Alsike Convent

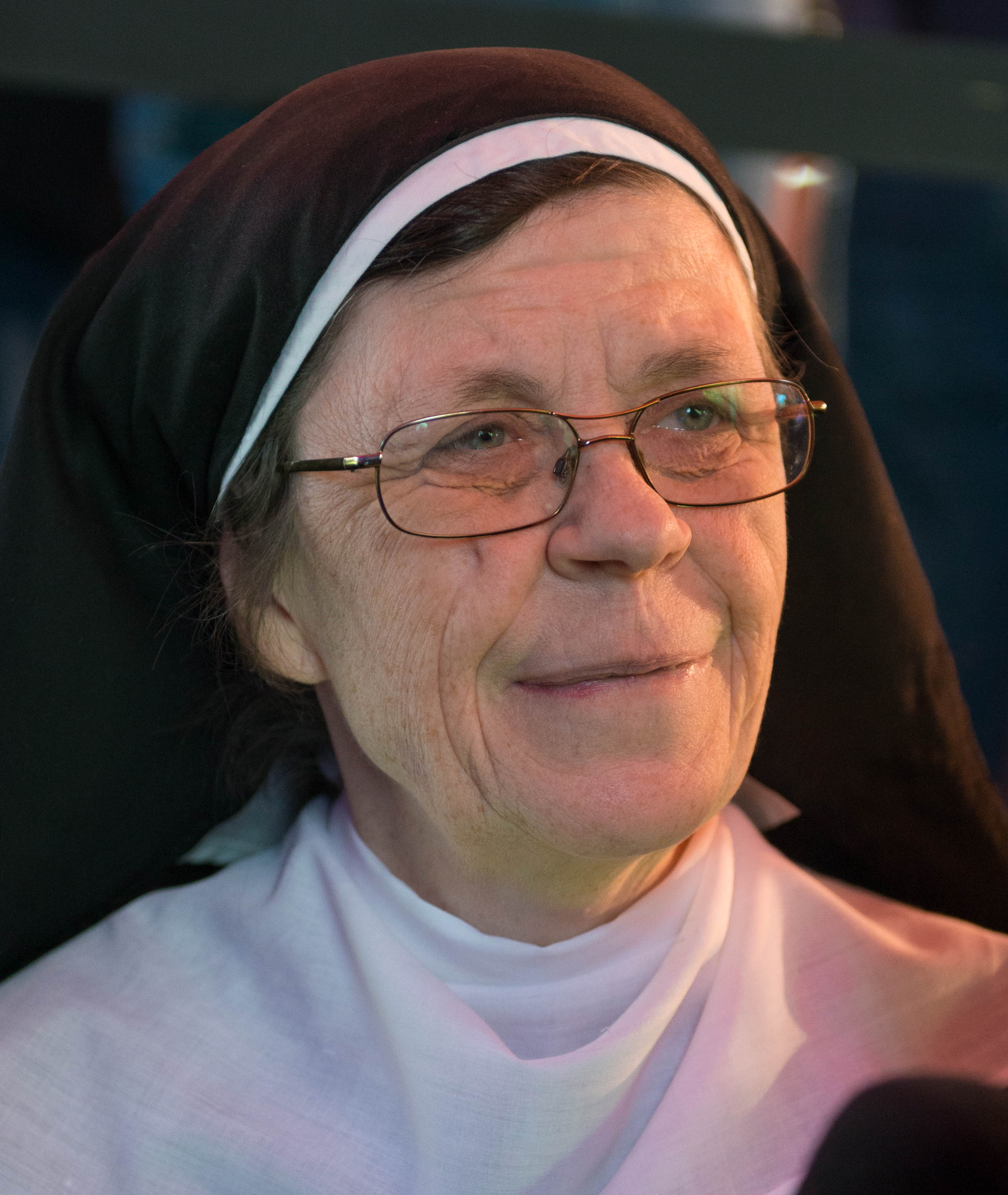
Sr. Karin Johansson, a nun of the Sisters of the Holy Spirit

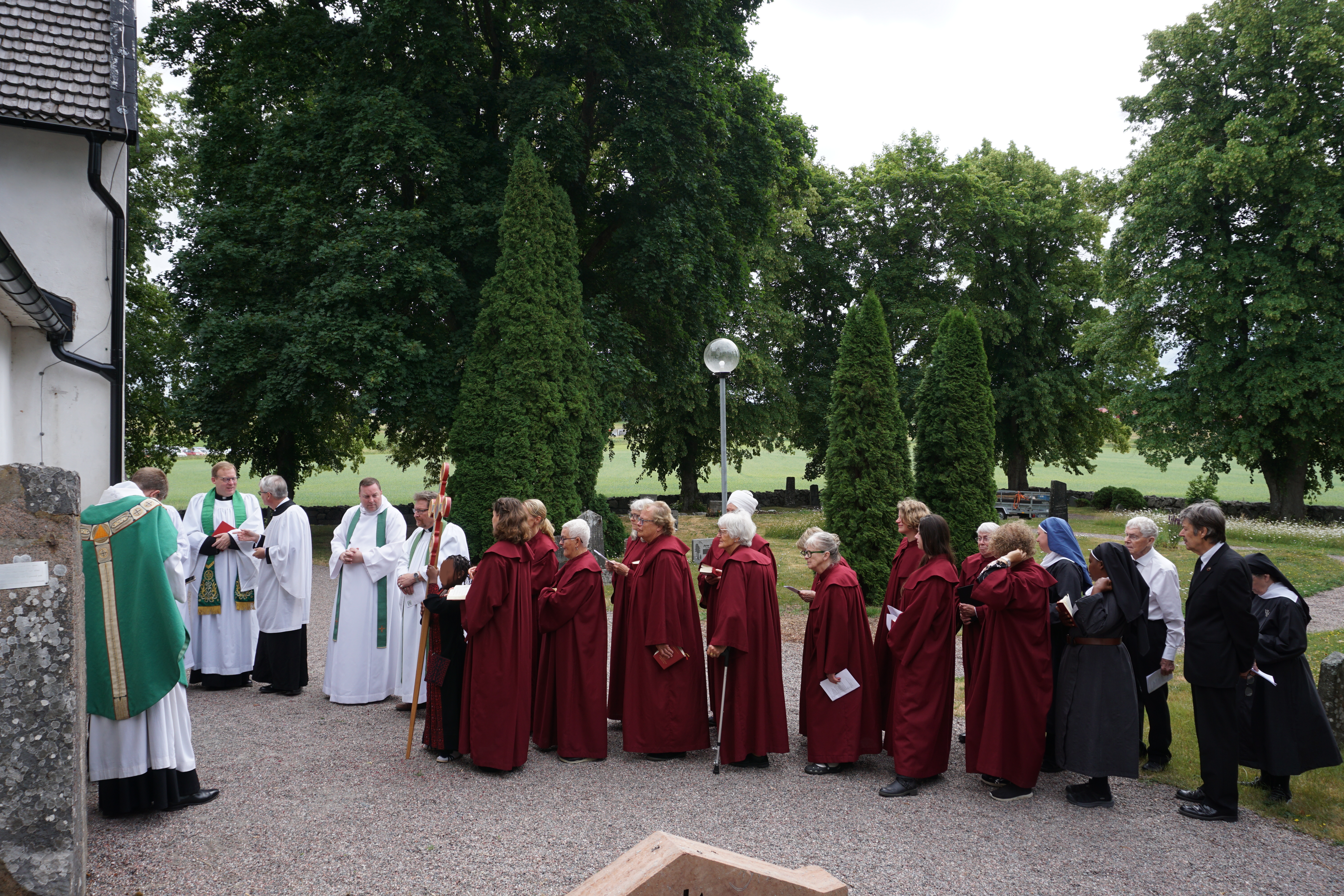
Nuns seen in the back of a procession at Alsike Church

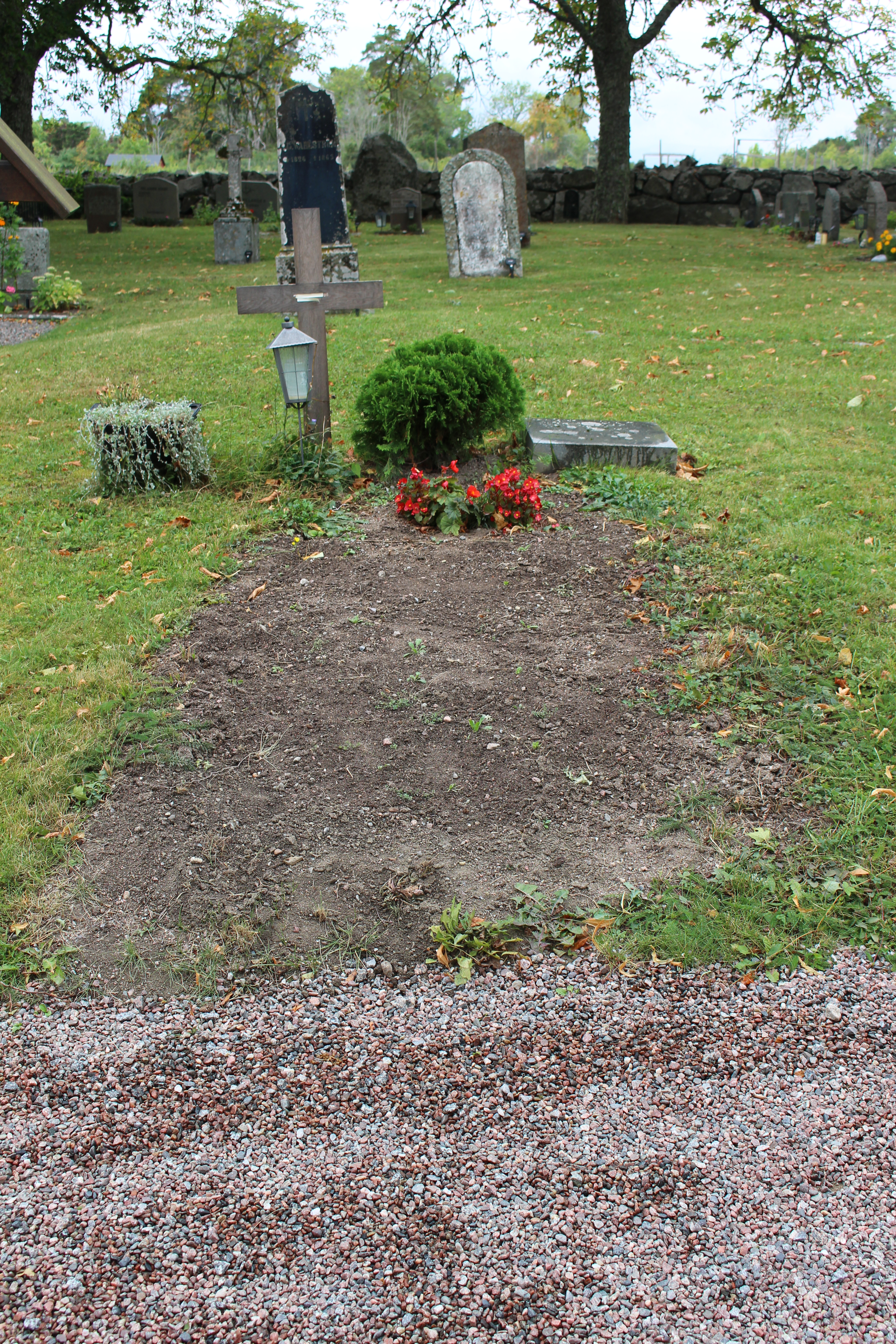
The grave of Sr. Marianne Nordström, a founder of Sisters of the Holy Spirit

== In popular culture ==
The Swedish short film Guds rikes ambassad, directed by Amelie Herbertsson, Izabelle Nordfjell and Therese Jahnson, is a documentary on the Sisters of the Holy Spirit at Alsike Convent.

== See also ==
- Brothers of the Holy Cross
- Daughters of Mary (Lutheran)
