= Palathara =

Palathara is a Malayali surname. Notable people with the surname include:

- Don Palathara (born 1986), Indian film director
- Simon Stock Palathara (1935–2022), Indian Catholic bishop
