= John Perumattam =

- Bishop of Syro-Malabar Catholic Diocese of Ujjain
- Church: Syro-Malabar Catholic Church
- See: Syro-Malabar Catholic Diocese of Ujjain
- In office: 1968–1998
- Predecessor: none
- Successor: Sebastian Vadakel
- Previous post: Prelate

Orders
- Ordination: 11 March 1951

Personal details
- Born: 3 November 1921 Kakkoor, India
- Died: 18 June 2011 (aged 89) Ujjain, India

John Perumattam (3 November 1921 – 18 June 2011) was an Indian Prelate of Syro-Malabar Catholic Church.

John Perumattam was born in Kakkoor, India, ordained a priest on 11 March 1951. Perumattam was appointed Exarch to the Syro-Malabar Catholic Diocese of Ujjain on 29 July 1968 and would be ordained bishop 15 May 1977. Perumattam would retire as bishop of the Diocese of Ujjain on 4 April 1998. Perumattam was one of founding members of the Missionary Society of Saint Thomas and first director general of the society. Perumattam died in a hospital in Ujjain. He was 89.

== See also ==
- Syro-Malabar Catholic Diocese of Ujjain
- Missionary Society of Saint Thomas
