= Evangelical counsels =

Poverty, (perfect) chastity, and obedience

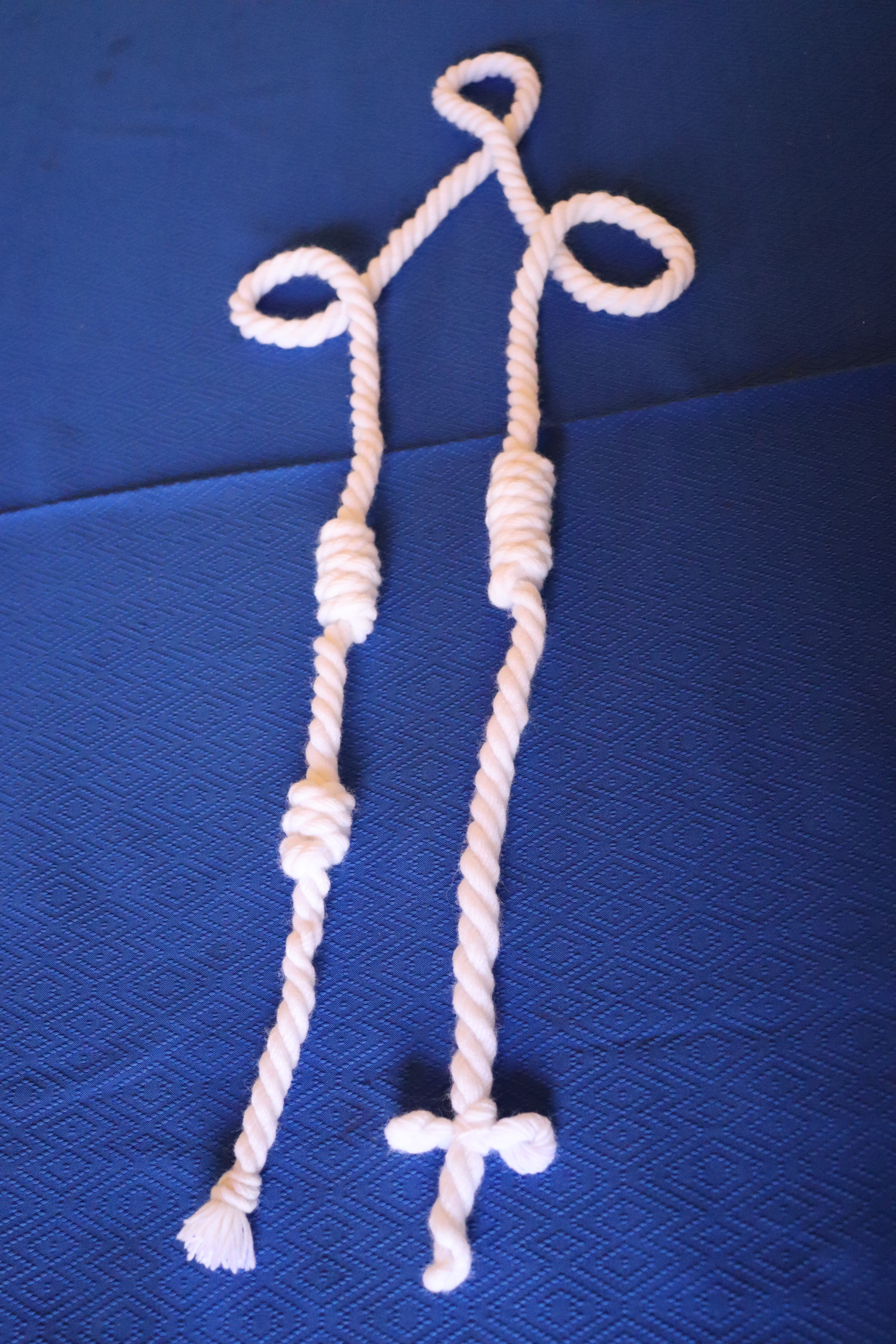
A cincture as worn by the Franciscans; the three knots symbolize the vows of poverty, chastity and obedience.

In Christianity, the three evangelical counsels, or counsels of perfection, are poverty, chastity, and obedience. As stated by Jesus Christ in the canonical gospels, they are counsels for those who desire to become "perfect" (τελειος, teleios).

The Catholic Church interprets this to mean that they are not binding upon all, and hence not necessary conditions to attain eternal life (heaven), but that they are "acts of supererogation", "over and above" the minimum stipulated in the biblical commandments. Catholics and Lutherans who have made a public profession to order their lives by the evangelical counsels, and confirmed this by public vows before their competent church authority (the act of religious commitment known as a profession), are recognised as members of the consecrated life.

== Consecrated life ==
=== New Testament context ===
A young man in the Christian gospels asked what he should do to obtain eternal life, and Jesus told him to "keep the commandments", but when the young man pressed further, Christ told him: "If thou wilt be perfect, go sell what thou hast, and give to the poor". It is from this passage that the term "counsel of perfection" comes. Again in the Gospels, Jesus speaks of "eunuchs who have made themselves eunuchs for the kingdom of heaven", and added "He that can receive it, let him receive it". St. Paul presses home the duty incumbent on all Christians of keeping free from all sins of the flesh, and of fulfilling the obligations of the married state, if they have taken those obligations upon themselves, but also gives his "counsel" in favor of the unmarried state and of perfect chastity (celibacy), on the ground that it is thus more possible to serve God with an undivided allegiance.

=== In Christian tradition ===
There are early forms of religious vows in the monastic traditions. The Rule of Saint Benedict (ch. 58.17) indicates that the newly received promise stability, fidelity to monastic life, and obedience. Religious vows in the form of the three evangelical counsels of chastity, poverty, and obedience were first made in the twelfth century by Francis of Assisi and his followers, the first of the mendicant orders. These vows are made now by the members of all religious institutes founded subsequently (cf. 1983 Code of Canon Law, can. 573) and constitute the basis of their other regulations of their life and conduct.

Members of religious institutes confirm their intention to observe the evangelical counsels by vows – that is, vows that the superior of the religious institute accepts in the name of the Church — or by other sacred bonds.

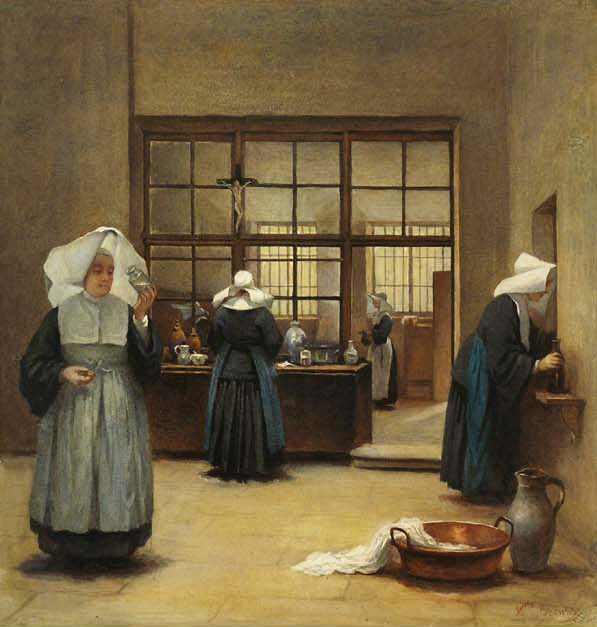
Henriette Browne Nuns at work in the cloister

Apart from the consecrated life, Christians are free to make a private vow to observe one or more of the evangelical counsels; but a private vow does not have the same binding and other effects in church law as a public vow.

The danger in the Early Church, even in Apostolic times, was not that the "counsels" would be neglected or denied, but that they should be exalted into commands of universal obligation, "forbidding to marry" (1 Timothy 4:3), and imposing poverty as a duty on all.

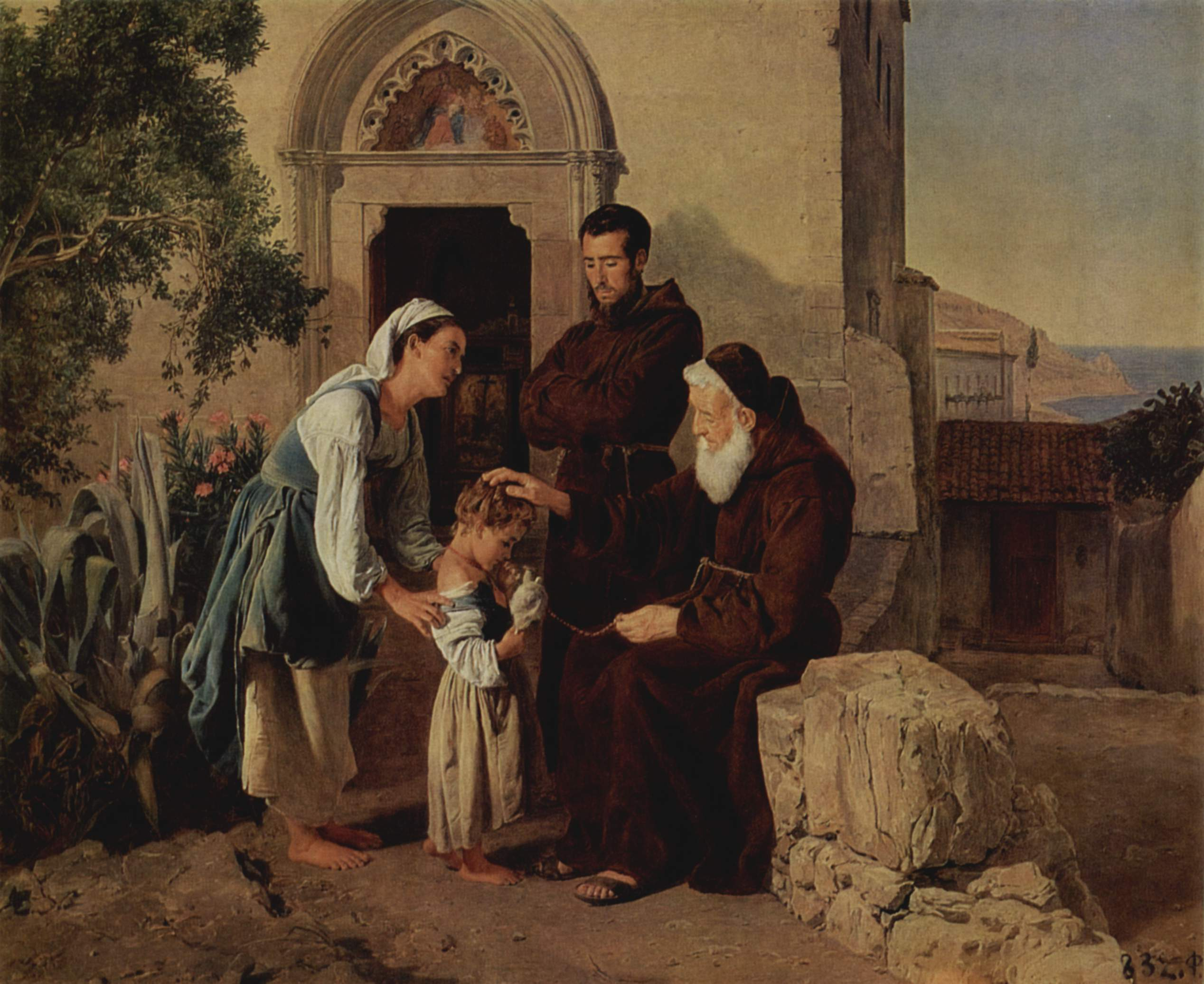
Ferdinand Georg Waldmüller, Am Klostertor

These counsels have been analyzed as a way to keep the world from distracting the soul, on the grounds that the principal good things of this world easily divide themselves into three classes. There are the riches which make life easy and pleasant, there are the pleasures of the flesh which appeal to the appetites, and, lastly, there are honors and positions of authority which delight the self-love of the individual. These three matters, in themselves often innocent and not forbidden to the devout Christian, may yet, even when no kind of sin is involved, hold back the soul from its true aim and vocation, and delay it from becoming entirely conformed to the will of God. It is, therefore, the object of the three counsels of perfection to free the soul from these hindrances. The love of riches is opposed by the counsel of poverty, the pleasures of the flesh (even the lawful pleasures of holy matrimony) are excluded by the counsel of chastity, while the desire for worldly power and honor is met by the counsel of holy obedience. Abstinence from unlawful indulgence in any of these directions is expected of all Christians as a matter of precept. The further voluntary abstinence from what is in itself lawful is the subject of the counsels, and such abstinence is not in itself meritorious, but only becomes so when it is done for the sake of Christ, and in order to be more free to serve him.

The Catholic Encyclopedia article ends with the following summary:

To sum up: it is possible to be rich, and married, and held in honour by all men, and yet keep the Commandments and to enter heaven. Christ's advice is, if we would make sure of everlasting life and desire to conform ourselves perfectly to the Divine will, that we should sell our possessions and give the proceeds to others who are in need, that we should live a life of chastity for the Gospel's sake, and, finally, should not seek honours or commands, but place ourselves under obedience. These are the Evangelical Counsels, and the things which are counselled are not set forward so much as good in themselves, as in the light of means to an end and as the surest and quickest way of obtaining everlasting life.

The Second Vatican Council's Decree on the Adaptation and Renewal of Religious Life (Perfectae Caritatis, 1965) exhorted "those who make profession of the evangelical counsels [to] seek and love above all else God who has first loved us (cf. 1 John 4:10) and [to] strive to foster in all circumstances a life hidden with Christ in God (cf. Colossians 3:3). The Council's Dogmatic Constitution on the Church also asserts that "it is the duty of the ecclesiastical hierarchy to regulate the practice of the evangelical counsels by law".

== Criticisms of supererogatory interpretation of evangelical counsels ==
In a 1523 essay, Martin Luther criticized the evangelical counsels to be supererogatory, and the two-tiered system to be a sophistic corruption of the teaching of Christ, intended to accommodate the vices of the aristocracy:

You are perturbed over Christ's injunction in Matthew 5, 'Do not resist evil, but make friends with your accuser; and if any one should take your coat, let him have your cloak as well.' ... The sophists in the universities have also been perplexed by these texts. ... In order not to make heathen of the princes, they taught that Christ did not demand these things but merely offered them as advice or counsel to those who would be perfect. So Christ had to become a liar and be in error in order that the princes might come off with honor, for they could not exalt the princes without degrading Christ—wretched blind sophists that they are. And their poisonous error has spread thus to the whole world until everyone regards these teachings of Christ not as precepts binding on all Christians alike but as mere counsels for the perfect.

Dietrich Bonhoeffer argues that the interpretation of the evangelical counsels to be supererogatory acquiesces in what he calls "cheap grace", lowering the standard of Christian teaching:

The difference between ourselves and the rich young man is that he was not allowed to solace his regrets by saying: 'Never mind what Jesus says, I can still hold on to my riches, but in a spirit of inner detachment. Despite my inadequacy I can take comfort in the thought that God has forgiven me my sins and can have fellowship with Christ in faith.' But no, he went away sorrowful. Because he would not obey, he could not believe. In this the young man was quite honest. He went away from Jesus and indeed this honesty had more promise than any apparent communion with Jesus based on disobedience.

Though not considering them to be supererogatory, Evangelical-Lutheran religious orders, such Daughters of Mary (sisters who have a devotion to the Blessed Virgin Mary), and The Congregation of the Servants of Christ (monks who follow the Rule of Saint Benedict), take solemn vows of poverty, chastity, and obedience.

== See also ==
- Provida Mater Ecclesia
- Ministry of Jesus
- Essenes
- The Perfecti, members of the Cathars who also led ascetic lives of chastity and abstinence, though most followers followed easier rules of conduct.
