= Anthony Chirayath =

Syro-Malabar prelate (born 1941)

- Bishop Emeritus of Sagar
- Appointed: 2 February 2006
- Term ended: 12 January 2018
- Predecessor: Joseph Pastor Neelankavil
- Successor: James Athikalam

Orders
- Ordination: 2 January 1970
- Consecration: 25 March 2006 by Varkey Vithayathil

Personal details
- Born: 30 July 1941 (age 84) Aranattukara, British Raj

Styles of Anthony Chirayath
- Reference style: His Excellency; The Most Reverend
- Spoken style: Your Excellency
- Religious style: Bishop

Anthony Chirayath (born 30 July 1941) is an Indian prelate of the Syro-Malabar Church who was the Bishop of Sagar from 2006 to 2018.

== Biography ==
Chirayath was born in Aranattukara on 30 July 1941. He was ordained a priest on 2 January 1970.

Chirayath was appointed by Pope Benedict XVI as Bishop of Sagar on 2 February 2006. The Major Archbishop of Ernakulam-Angamaly, Cardinal Varkey Vithayathil CSsR, granted his episcopal consecration on 25 March of the same year; co-consecrators were Jacob Thoomkuzhy, Archbishop of Trichur, and his predecessor Joseph Pastor Neelankavil CMI.

On 12 January 2018, Pope Francis accepted Chirayath's retirement due to age.
