= Eparchy of Jagdalpur =

Eastern Catholic eparchy in Chhattisgarh, India

Location
- Country: India
- Ecclesiastical province: Archeparchy of Ujjain

Statistics
- Area: 39,176 km^{2} (15,126 sq mi)
- Population: Total; Catholics: (as of 2023); 3,554,250; 12,850 (0.4%)
- Parishes: 24

Information
- Denomination: Syro-Malabar Catholic Church
- Sui iuris church: Syro-Malabar Church
- Rite: East Syriac Rite
- Established: 23 March 1972; 54 years ago
- Cathedral: Cathedral of St Joseph in Jagdalpur
- Patron saint: Saint Joseph
- Secular priests: 93 (39 Diocesan, 54 Religious Orders)

Current leadership
- Pope: Mar Leo XIV
- Major Archbishop: Mar Raphael Thattil
- Bishop: Mar Joseph Kollamparampil, C.M.I.
- Metropolitan Archbishop: Mar Sebastian Vadakel MST

Map
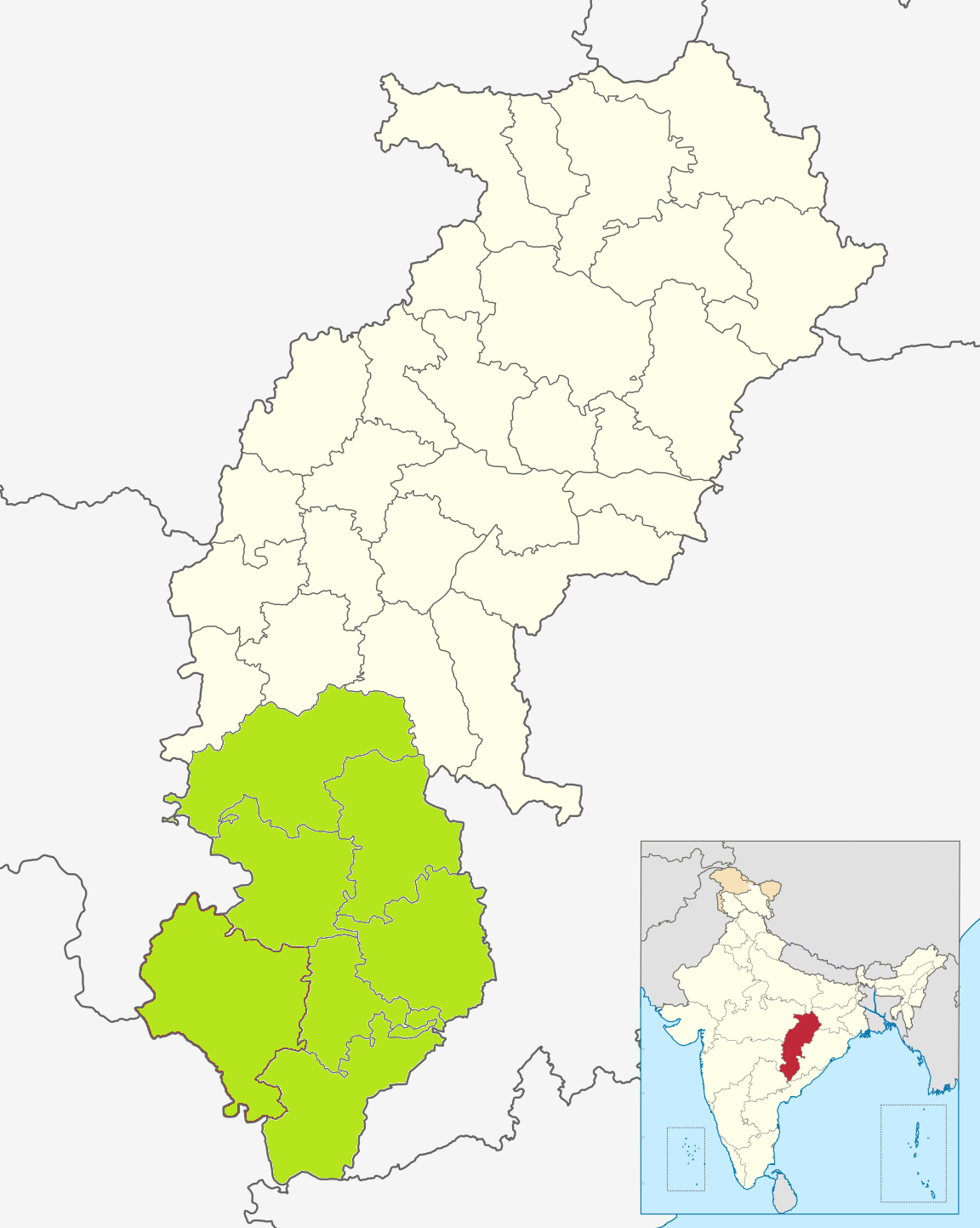

Website
- Website of the Diocese

The Eparchy of Jagdalpur is an Eastern Catholic eparchy in India, under the Syro-Malabar Catholic Church. It came into existence when in 1977 it was raised to a diocese by Pope Paul VI by the Bull "Nobismetipsis" of 26 February, Mar Simon Stock Palathara CMI was ordained and installed as the second Bishop of Jagdalpur. On 2013 July 16, Pope Francis accepted the resignation of Mar Simon Stock Palathara, CMI and appointed Mar Joseph Kollamparambil CMI as the new bishop.

== Ordinaries ==
Apostolic Exarch of Jagdalpur (East Syriac Rite)

- Paulinus Jeerakath, C.M.I. (23 March 1972 – 26 February 1977 see below)

Eparchs of Jagdalpur (East Syriac Rite)

- Paulinus Jeerakath, C.M.I. (see above 26 February 1977 – 7 August 1990)
- Simon Stock Palathara, C.M.I. (16 December 1992 – 16 July 2013), retired
- Joseph Kollamparampil, C.M.I. (16 July 2013 – Present)
