= Joseph Pastor Neelankavil =

Indian bishop (1930–2021)

Joseph Pastor Neelankavil C.M.I.
- Bishop of Sagar
- Church: Syro-Malabar Church
- Diocese: Eparchy of Sagar
- In office: 20 December 1986 – 2 February 2006
- Predecessor: Clement Thottungal
- Successor: Anthony Chirayath

Orders
- Ordination: 17 May 1960 by Joseph Parecattil
- Consecration: 22 February 1987 by Joseph Kundukulam

Personal details
- Born: 19 March 1930 Aranattukara, Kingdom of Travancore, British Raj, British Empire
- Died: 17 February 2021 (aged 90)
- Denomination: Catholic Church

Joseph Pastor Neelankavil (19 March 1930 – 17 February 2021) was a bishop of the Syro-Malabar Church.

Neelankavil was born in Aranattukara, Kerala, India and was ordained to the priesthood in 1960. He studied theology at Dharmaram Vidya Kshetram. He served as bishop of the Syro-Malabar Catholic Eparchy of Sagar, India, from 1987 to 2006.

Neelankavil died from COVID-19 on 17 February 2021.
