= Religious vows =

Promises made by members of religious communities

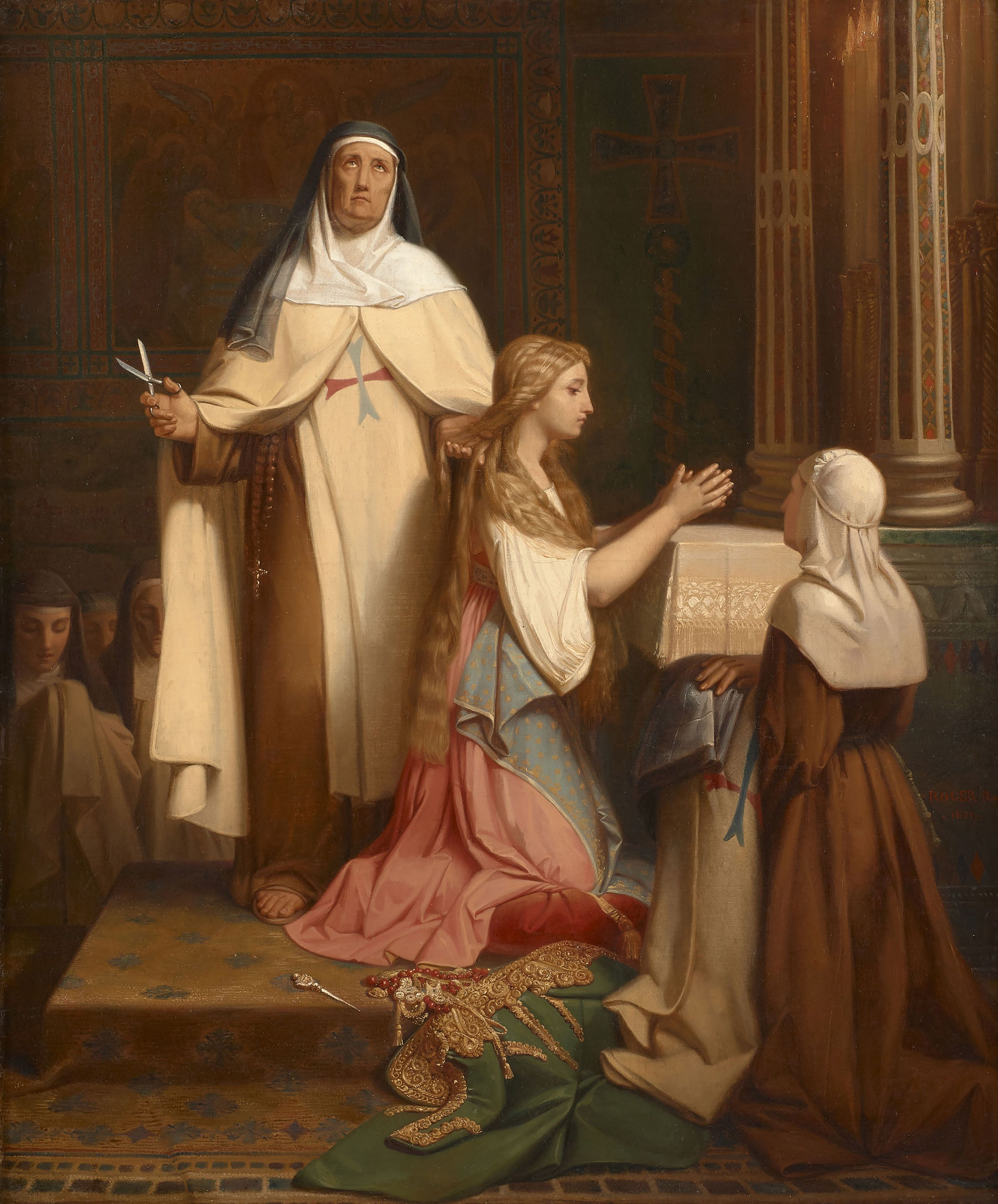
Une prise de voile ("Taking the Veil") by Adolphe Roger (1829).

Religious vows are the public vows made by the members of religious communities pertaining to their conduct, practices, and views.

In the Buddhist tradition, in particular within the Mahayana and Vajrayana traditions, many different kinds of religious vows are taken by the lay community as well as by the monastic community, as they progress along the path of their practice. In the monastic tradition of all schools of Buddhism, the Vinaya expounds the vows of the fully ordained Nuns and Monks.

In the Christian tradition, such public vows are made by the religious – cenobitic and eremitic – of the Catholic Church, Lutheran Churches, Anglican Communion, and Eastern Orthodox Churches, whereby they confirm their public profession of the evangelical counsels of poverty, chastity, and obedience or Benedictine equivalent. The vows are regarded as the individual's free response to a call by God to follow Jesus Christ more closely under the action of the Holy Spirit in a particular form of religious living. A person who lives a religious life according to vows they have made is called a votary or a votarist. The religious vow, being a public vow, is binding in Church law. One of its effects is that the person making a perpetual (or final) vow ceases to be free to marry. In the Catholic Church, by joining the consecrated life, one does not become a member of the sacred hierarchy but becomes a member of a state of life which is neither clerical nor lay, the consecrated state. Nevertheless, the members of the religious orders and those hermits who are in Holy Orders are members of the sacred hierarchy.

== Christianity ==
=== In the Western Churches ===
Since the 6th century, monks and nuns following the Rule of Saint Benedict have been making the Benedictine vow at their public profession of obedience (placing oneself under the direction of the abbot/abbess or prior/prioress), stability (committing oneself to a particular monastery), and "conversion of manners" (which includes celibate chastity and forgoing private ownership).

During the 12th and 13th centuries mendicant orders emerged, such as the Franciscans and Dominicans, whose vocation emphasizing mobility and flexibility required them to drop the concept of "stability". They therefore professed chastity, poverty and obedience, like the members of many other orders and religious congregations founded subsequently.

The "clerks regular" of the 16th century and after, such as the Jesuits and Redemptorists, followed this same general format, though some added a "fourth vow", indicating some special apostolate or attitude within the order. Fully professed Jesuits (known as "the professed of the fourth vow" within the order), take a vow of particular obedience to the Pope to undertake any mission laid out in their Formula of the Institute. Poor Clares additionally profess a vow of enclosure. The Missionaries of Charity, founded by St. Teresa of Calcutta centuries later (1940s) take a fourth vow of special service to "the poorest of the poor".

==== In the Catholic Church ====
In the Catholic Church, the vows of members of religious orders and congregations are regulated by canons 654–658 of the Code of Canon Law. These are public vows, meaning vows accepted by a superior in the name of the Church, and they are usually of two durations: temporary, and, after a few years, final vows (permanent or "perpetual"). The public profession of the evangelical counsels (or counsels of perfection), confirmed by vow or other sacred bond, is a requirement of Canon Law.

Depending on the order, temporary vows may be renewed a number of times before permission to take final vows is given. There are exceptions: the Jesuits' first vows are perpetual, for instance, and the Sisters of Charity take only temporary but renewable vows.

Religious vows are of two varieties: simple vows and solemn vows. The highest level of commitment is exemplified by those who have taken their solemn, perpetual vows. There were once significant technical differences between them in canon law, but these differences were suppressed by the current Code of Canon Law in 1983, although the nominal distinction is maintained. Only a limited number of religious congregations may invite their members to solemn vows; most religious congregations are only authorized to take simple vows. Even in congregations with solemn vows, some members with perpetual vows may have taken them simply rather than solemnly.

A perpetual vow can be superseded by the pope, when he decides that a man under perpetual vows should become a bishop of the Church. In these cases, the ties to the order the new bishop had are dissolved as if the bishop had never been a member; hence, such a person as Pope Francis, for example, had no formal ties to his old order for years. However, if the bishop was a member in good standing, he will be regarded, informally, as "one of us", and he will always be welcome in any of the order's houses.

There are other forms of consecrated life in the Catholic Church for both men and women. They make a public profession of the evangelical counsels of chastity, poverty, and obedience, confirmed by a vow or other sacred bond, regulated by canon law but live consecrated lives in the world (i.e. not as members of a religious institute). Such are the secular institutes, the diocesan hermits (canon 603) and the consecrated virgins (canon 604). These make a public profession of the evangelical counsels by a vow or other sacred bond. Also similar are the societies of apostolic life. Diocesan hermits individually profess the three evangelical counsels in the hands of their local ordinary. Consecrated virgins living in the world do not make religious vows, but express by a public so-called sanctum propositum ("holy purpose") to follow Christ more closely. The prayer of consecration that constitutes such virgins "sacred persons" inserts them into the Ordo Virginum and likewise places them in the consecrated life in the Catholic Church.

==== In the Lutheran Church ====
Evangelical-Lutheran religious orders, such Daughters of Mary (sisters who have a devotion to the Blessed Virgin Mary), and The Congregation of the Servants of Christ (monks who follow the Rule of Saint Benedict), take solemn vows of poverty, chastity, and obedience.

=== In the Eastern Orthodox Church ===
Although the taking of vows was not a part of the earliest monastic foundations (the wearing of a particular monastic habit is the earliest recorded manifestation of those who had left the world), vows did come to be accepted as a normal part of the tonsure service in the Christian East. Previously, one would simply find a spiritual father and live under his direction. Once one put on the monastic habit, it was understood that one had made a lifetime commitment to God and would remain steadfast in it to the end. Over time, however, the formal Tonsure and taking of vows was adopted to impress upon the monastic the seriousness of the commitment to the ascetic life he or she was adopting.

The vows taken by Orthodox monks are: Chastity, poverty, obedience, and stability. The vows are administered by the abbot or hieromonk who performs the service. Following a period of instruction and testing as a novice, a monk or nun may be tonsured with the permission of the candidate's spiritual father. There are three degrees of monasticism in the Orthodox Church: The ryassaphore (one who wears the ryassa – however, there are no vows at this level – the Stavrophore (one who wears the cross), and the Schema-monk (one who wears the Great Schema; i.e., the full monastic habit). The one administering the tonsure must be an ordained priest, and must be a monk of at least the rank he is tonsuring the candidate into. However, a bishop – who, in the Orthodox Church, must always be a monk – may tonsure a monk or nun into any degree regardless of his own monastic rank.
