= Archeparchy of Ujjain =

Eastern Catholic Archeparchy in Madhya Pradesh, India

Archeparchy of Ujjain ܐܪܟܝܕܝܘܩܝܐ ܕܐܘܼܝܸܝܢ

Location
- Country: India

Statistics
- Area: 18,225 km^{2} (7,037 sq mi)
- Population: Total; Catholics: (as of 2010); 4,396,000; 3,398 (0.1%)

Information
- Rite: East Syriac rite
- Cathedral: St. Mary’s Cathedral in Ujjain
- Patron saint: Saint Paul

Current leadership
- Pope: Mar Leo XIV
- Major Archbishop: Mar Raphael Thattil
- Metropolitan Archbishop: Mar Sebastian Vadakel MST
- Suffragans: Eparchy of Sagar; Eparchy of Satna; Eparchy of Jagdalpur

Website
- Website of the Diocese

The Archeparchy of Ujjain is an ecclesiastical district of the Syro-Malabar Church, an Eastern Catholic Church of the East Syriac Rite in India. Its cathedral episcopal see is St. Mary's Cathedral, in Ujjain, Madhya Pradesh in Central India.

In August 2025, Major Archbishop Raphael Thattil elevated it as an archeparchy and appointed Mar Sebastian Vadakel the bishop of the Ujjain as its first Metropolitan Archbishop. The archeparchy leads the church's ecclesiastical province that serves most of Central India.

== Statistics ==
As per 2014, it pastorally served 4,602 Eastern Catholics (0.1% of 6,253,649 total) on 18,441 km^{2} in 41 parishes and a mission with 93 priests (41 diocesan, 52 religious), 433 lay religious (120 brothers, 313 sisters) and 9 seminarians.

== History ==
- It was created on 29 July 1968 as Apostolic Exarchate of Ujjain, on territory split off from the (Latin) Diocese of Indore.
- On 26 February 1977 the Apostolic Exarchate was elevated to Diocese of Ujjain.
- On 28 August 2025, eparchy received territory from the Eparchy of Shamshabad. The ecclesiastical province of Ujjain was established by elevating the Eparchy of Ujjain as a metropolitan archeparchy and constituting Sagar, Satna and Jagadalpur as suffragan eparchies.

== Suffragan Diocese ==
- Eparchy of Sagar
- Eparchy of Satna
- Eparchy of Jagdalpur

== Prelates ==
Apostolic Exarch of Ujjain

Sl.No	Ordinary	Designation	Year of appointment	Last year of service
1	Father John Perumattam Missionary Society of St Thomas (M.S.T.)	Apostolic Exarch	29 July 1968	26 February 1977

Bishops

Sl.No	Ordinary	Designation	Year of appointment	Last year of service
1	John Perumattam Missionary Society of St Thomas (M.S.T.)	Bishop	26 February 1977	4 April 1998
2	Sebastian Vadakel Missionary Society of St Thomas (M.S.T.)	Bishop	4 April 1998	28 August 2025

ArchBishop

Sl.No	Ordinary	Designation	Year of appointment	Last year of service
1	Sebastian Vadakel Missionary Society of St Thomas (M.S.T.)	ArchBishop	28th August 2025	Present

== Ecclesiastical Province of Ujjain ==
With the prior consent of the Pope Leo XIV, and the unanimous decision of the synod of bishops of the Syro-Malabar Church, the Major Archbishop Raphael Thattil raised the Eparchy of Ujjain to an archeparchy and made it metropolitan see.

== See also ==
- List of Catholic dioceses in India

== Sources and external links ==
- GCatholic, with Google satellite photo - data for all sections
- Syro-Malabar Catholic Diocese of Ujjain on Catholic-Hierarchy
