= Eparchy of Sagar =

Eastern Catholic ecclesiastical province in Madhya Pradesh, India

Location
- Country: India
- Ecclesiastical province: Archeparchy of Ujjain

Statistics
- Area: 39,020 km^{2} (15,070 sq mi)
- Population: Total; Catholics: (as of 2010); 4,907,000; 3,361 (0.1%)

Information
- Denomination: Syro-Malabar Catholic Church
- Rite: Syro-Malabar Rite
- Cathedral: St.Theresa's Cathedral Sagar Cantonment (formerly known as St. Raphael's Cathedral)
- Patron saint: St Thérèse of Lisieux

Current leadership
- Pope: Mar Leo XIV
- Major Archbishop: Mar Raphael Thattil
- Bishop: Mar James Athikalam MST
- Metropolitan Archbishop: Mar Sebastian Vadakel MST
- Bishops emeritus: Mar Antony Chirayath

Map
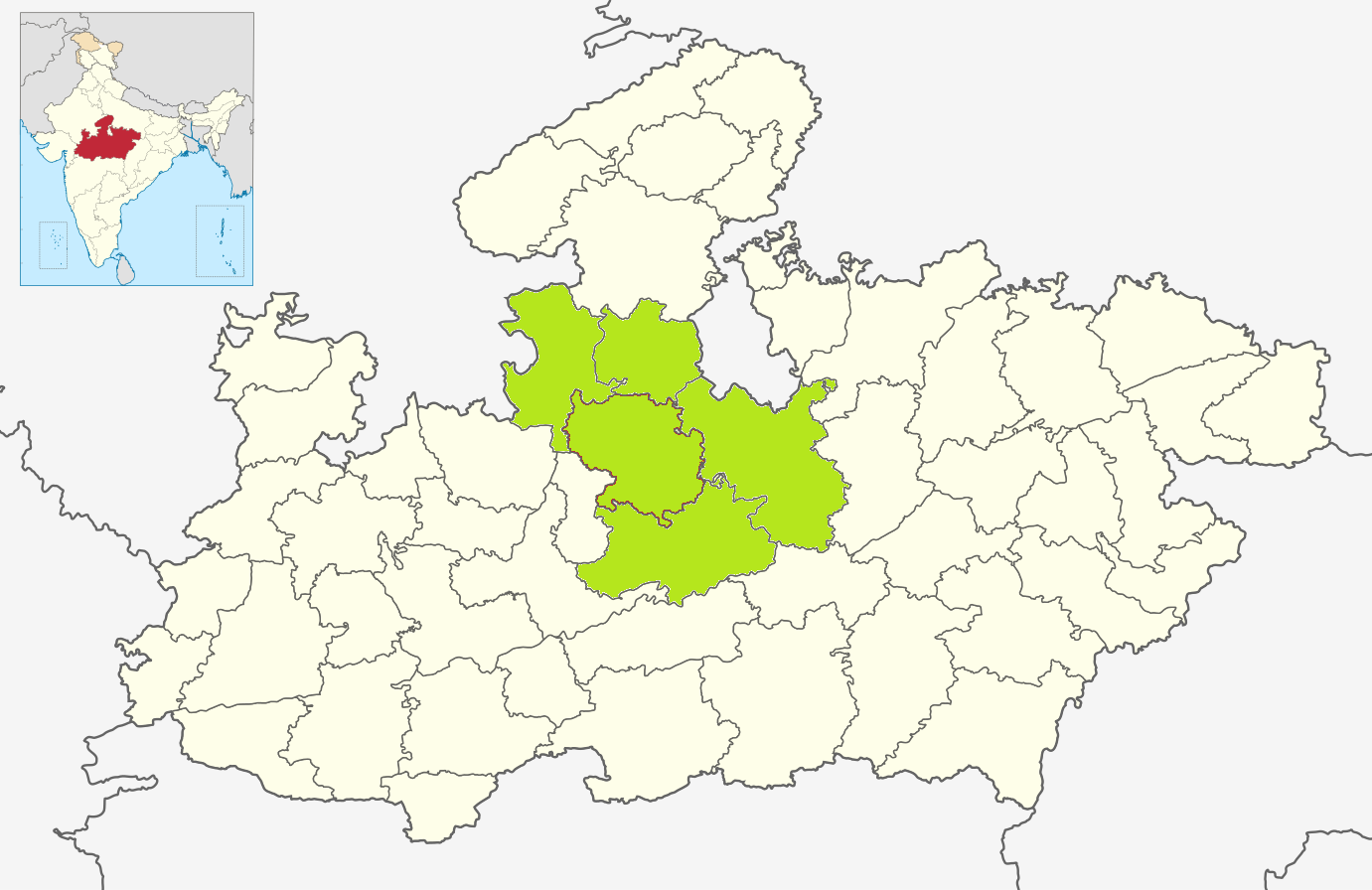

Website
- Website of the Diocese

The Eparchy of Sagar is an eparchy (Eastern Catholic diocese) in central India, which is part of the Syro-Malabar Catholic Church (Chaldean or Syro-Oriental Rite, led by the Major Archbishop, and is a suffragan in the ecclesiastical province of the Syro-Malabar Catholic Archeparchy of Ujjain. It was created in 1968 as (missionary) and promoted diocese in 1977 by the papal bull Divina Verba of Pope Paul VI.

Its cathedral episcopal see is St. Theresa’s Cathedral, in Saga(u)r.

== History ==
The future eparchy (diocese) of Sagar was erected as an apostolic exarchate (pre-diocesan missionary Eastern Catholic jurisdiction) by the papal bull Quo Aptius dated 29 July 1968, cutting out previously Latin rite territory from the Archdiocese of Bhopal the civil districts of Sagar, Raisen and Vidisha in Madhya Pradesh state. Again at the request of the Bishop of Ajmer-Jaipur, the district of Guna was added to the Exarchate of Sagar by the papal decree De Bono Animarum on 2 April 1973. The civil district of Guna was further bifurcated on 15 August 2003 to form the district of Ashoknagar.

The Holy See by its decree Divina Verba on 26 February 1977 raised the apostolic exarchate to the status of a proper eparchy (diocese). The exarch Clemens Thottungal CMI was promoted the first bishop of the eparchy. Mar Joseph Pastor Neelankavil CMI succeeded him as second bishop of the eparchy. After his retirement in 2006, Mar Anthony Chirayath was appointed bishop of the eparchy. Mar James Athikalam MST was ordained bishop of Sagar on 17 April 2018.

== Statistics and organization ==
As per 2015, the eparchy of Sagar, covering five civil districts in Madhya Pradesh (Sagar, Raisen, Vidisha, Guna and Ashoknagar), pastorally served 3,443 Catholics (0.1% of 5,311,000 total, about half of the Christians) on 39,020 km^{2}, in 44 parishes and 36 missions with 79 priests (58 diocesan, 21 religious), 295 lay religious (29 brothers, 266 sisters) and 17 seminarians.

The area is rather underdeveloped due to various social, economic and cultural reasons. Eighty-five per cent of the people are farmers or farm-workers. The labour is not well organised, and consequently a lot of exploitation prevails. Eighty per cent of the people are Hindus belonging to various castes and the rest are Muslims, Jains, Sikhs, Adivasis and a very small minority of Christians. The various Socio-Pastoral, Medical and Educational apostolates of the Church are being carried out in the eparchy under the Sagar Diocesan Service Society (SDSS), which is registered under the M.P. Government Firms and Societies Registration Act. For better coordination and management, the social work apostolate of the diocese is being carried out by Manav Vikas Seva Sangh (MVSS). There are also St. Francis Society (SFS) and Pushpa Service Society (PSS). All of these societies are registered under the M.P. Government Firms and Societies Registration Act.

Through various pastoral activities, the missionaries take care of the spiritual needs of the Catholics and other Gospel proclaiming programmes. There are many developmental programmes by which poor farmers and poverty-stricken people are helped. Missionaries in Sagar have always tried to venture into new areas of apostolate according to the need.

== Prelates ==
Apostolic Exarch of Sagar

Sl.No	Ordinary	Designation	Year of appointment	Last year of service
1	Rt. Rv Clement Thottungal	Apostolic Exarch	1968	1977

Bishops

Sl.No	Ordinary	Designation	Year of appointment	Last year of service
1	Clement Thottungal	Bishop	1977	1986
2	Joseph Pastor Neelankavil, C.M.I.	Bishop	1986	2006
3	Anthony Chirayath	Bishop	2006	2018
4	James Athikalam (M.S.T)	Bishop	2018	present

== Sources and External links ==
- Official Website:
- GCatholic
- Official Blog:
- Manav Vikas Seva Sang:
- St. Francis Society:
