= James Athikalam =

Syro-Malabar prelate (born 1958)

- Bishop of Sagar
- Appointed: 12 January 2018
- Predecessor: Anthony Chirayath

Orders
- Ordination: 22 March 1984
- Consecration: 17 April 2018 by George Alencherry

Personal details
- Born: 5 July 1958 (age 67) Pulinkunnoo, Kerala, India

Styles of James Athikalam
- Reference style: His Excellency; The Most Reverend
- Spoken style: Your Excellency
- Religious style: Bishop

James Athikalam (born 5 July 1958) is an Indian prelate of the Syro-Malabar Church. Since January 2018, he is the Bishop of Sagar.

== Biography ==
Athikalam was ordained a priest on 22 March 1984, in the Congregation of the Missionaries of St. Thomas the Apostle. He worked mainly in monastic seminaries. He was also, among others, general director of the congregation and head of the monastic project of the Nirmal Jyothi Mental Health Program.

On 12 January 2018, following the retirement of his predecessor Anthony Chirayath, Athikalam was appointed bishop of Sagar. He was conferred episcopal chirotonium on 17 April by the head of the Syro-Malabar Church, Archbishop George Alencherry.
