= Simon Stock Palathara =

Catholic bishop of Jagdalpur, India (1935–2022)

Mar Simon Stock Palathra CMI
- Eparch of Jagdalpur
- Church: Syro-Malabar Church
- Diocese: Eparchy of Jagdalpur
- In office: 16 December 1992 – 16 July 2013
- Predecessor: Paulinus Jeerakath
- Successor: Joseph Kollamparampil

Orders
- Ordination: 1 December 1964
- Consecration: 19 March 1993 by Antony Padiyara

Personal details
- Born: 11 October 1935 Vadakkekara,Changanassery, Kingdom of Travancore
- Died: 19 November 2022 (aged 87) Jagdalpur, Chhattisgarh, India

Mar Simon Stock Palathra CMI (11 October 1935 – 19 November 2022) was the second bishop of the Syro-Malabar Catholic Eparchy of Jagdalpur, India.

Bishop Simon Stock was born as the son of Mr. Philip and Mrs. Mary Philip on 11 October 1935, in Vadakkekara, Changanacherry, Kerala. After his High School Education in St. Berchman's Changanacherry and St. Epherm, Mannanam he joined the CMI Congregation in 1954.

He made his first religious profession on 16 May 1958. He had his Major Seminary formation at Dharmaram Vidya Kshetram, Bangalore and was ordained priest on 1 December 1964. From 1972 till 1977 he was the Pro-Exarch of the Exarchate of Jagdalpur and later till 1982 as its Vicar General. He was the Provincial Superior of the Jagdalpur Vice-Province of the CMI Congregation for two terms, from 1981 to 84 and 1987 to 90. He was nominated bishop of Jagdalpur in 1993 and was ordained Bishop on 19 March 1993.

He was retired from the active episcopal ministry as Bishop of the eparchy after completing 75 years of age in 2013. He then continued as the Bishop Emeritus of Syro-Malabar Catholic Eparchy of Jagdalpur. He was a priest for 57 years and a bishop for 29 years. He was called to eternal rest on 19 November 2022 at 1.30 am at MPM Hospital, Jagdalpur.
