= Alsike Church =

Church building in Knivsta Municipality, Sweden

Coordinates: 59°43′58″N 17°41′02″E

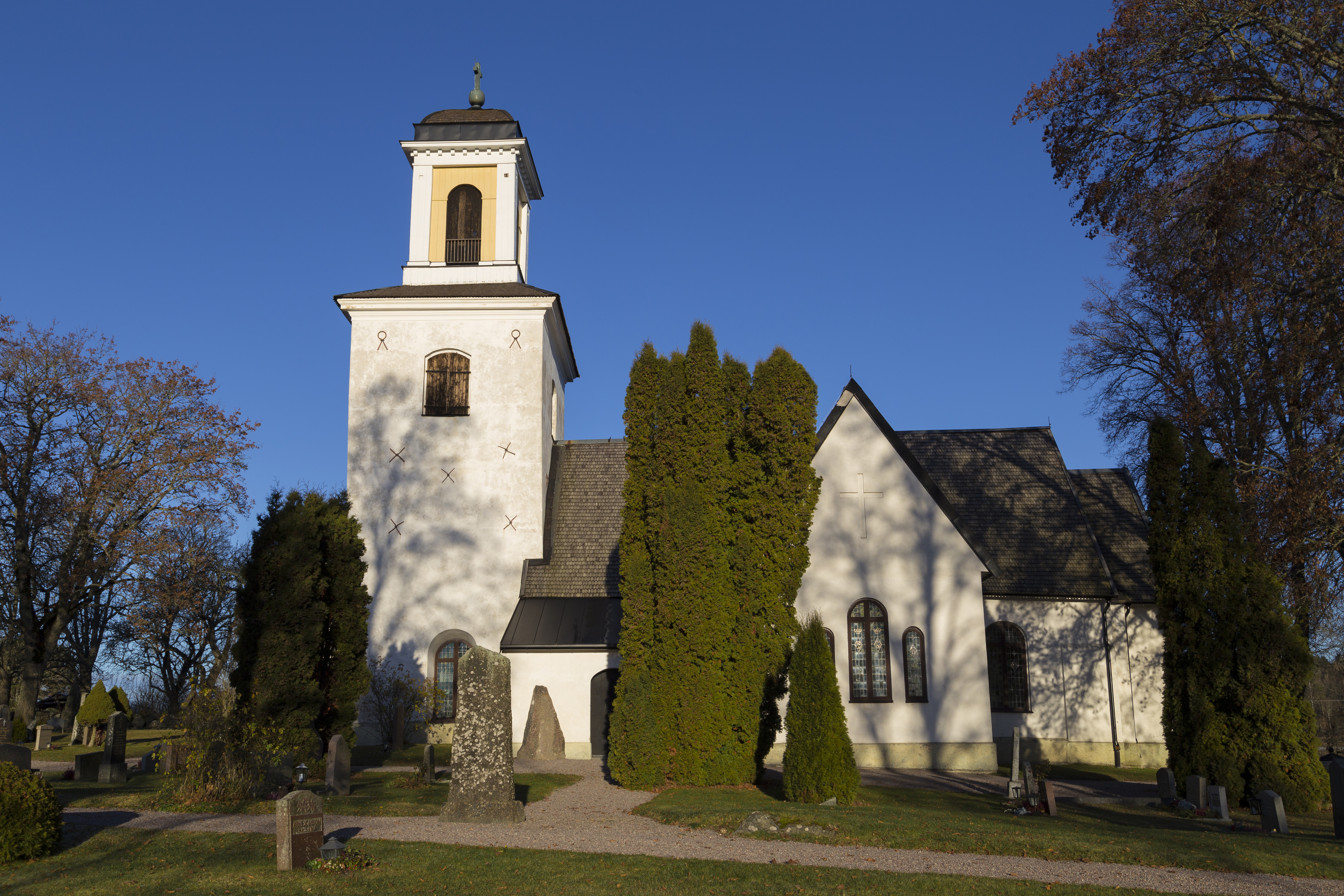
Alsike Church, view of the exterior

Alsike Church (Swedish: Alsike kyrka) is an Evangelical Lutheran church at Alsike in Uppsala County, Sweden. It lies in Knivsta Municipality, a suburb to Stockholm. The church is associated with the Archdiocese of Uppsala of the Church of Sweden.

The Sisters of the Holy Spirit at Alsike Convent is attached to Alsike Church.

== History and architecture ==
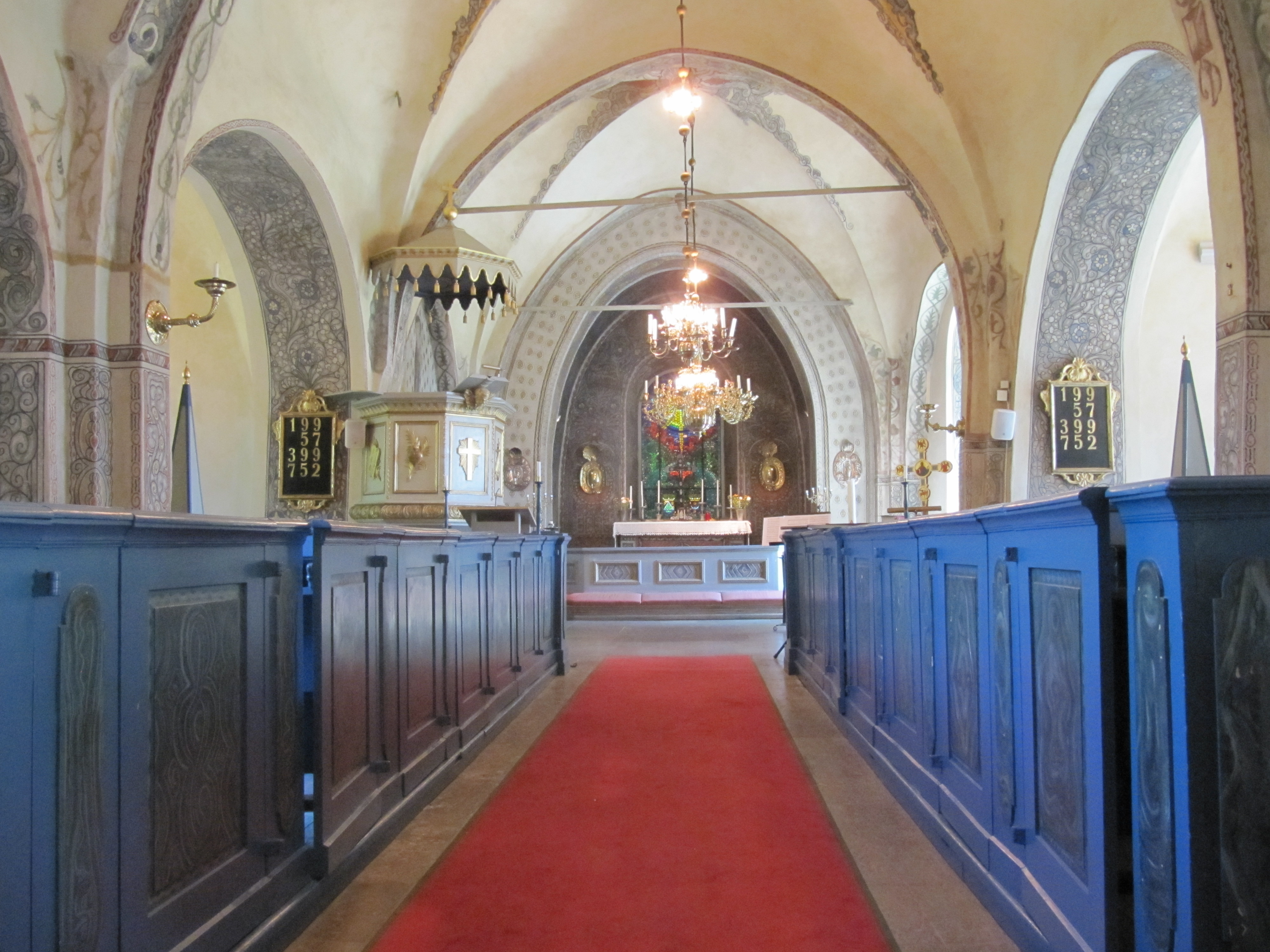
Alsike Church, interior

Alsike Church stands by a formerly important sea-route linking Uppsala, Sigtuna and Stockholm, in an area characterised by its old cultural landscape. Although the oldest parts of the presently visible church date from the 13th century, it was probably pre-dated by an earlier wooden church. The church is constructed largely in brick, a material not usually used in medieval churches in Uppland (fieldstone was often the material of choice). The use of brick may be explained by the vicinity to the more costly churches in Sigtuna or Sko Abbey near Skokloster Castle (Skoklosters slott). The main part of the church was probably built circa 1250-1350. The tower and the church porch date from the 15th century, and during the same century the church was also equipped with mural-decorated vaults; due to later damage these have been rebuilt and only fragments of the murals still remain.

The church was rebuilt during the mid-19th century. Two transepts were added, and the exterior whitewashed. Inside the church was equipped with a new pulpit and new pews. In 1910-11, the church was redecorated internally with paintings in Art Nouveau style by architect Sigurd Curman (1879-1966). During repairs in 1947 a runestone was discovered in the church; it is displayed at the church entrance.

The church is characterised by a mix of medieval and neoclassical styles as a result of the reconstruction during the 19th century. Among the furnishings, a Venetian crucifix from c. 1600 and a figure of Christ from the 15th century are noteworthy.
