= Consecrated life =

Vocation in certain branches of Christianity

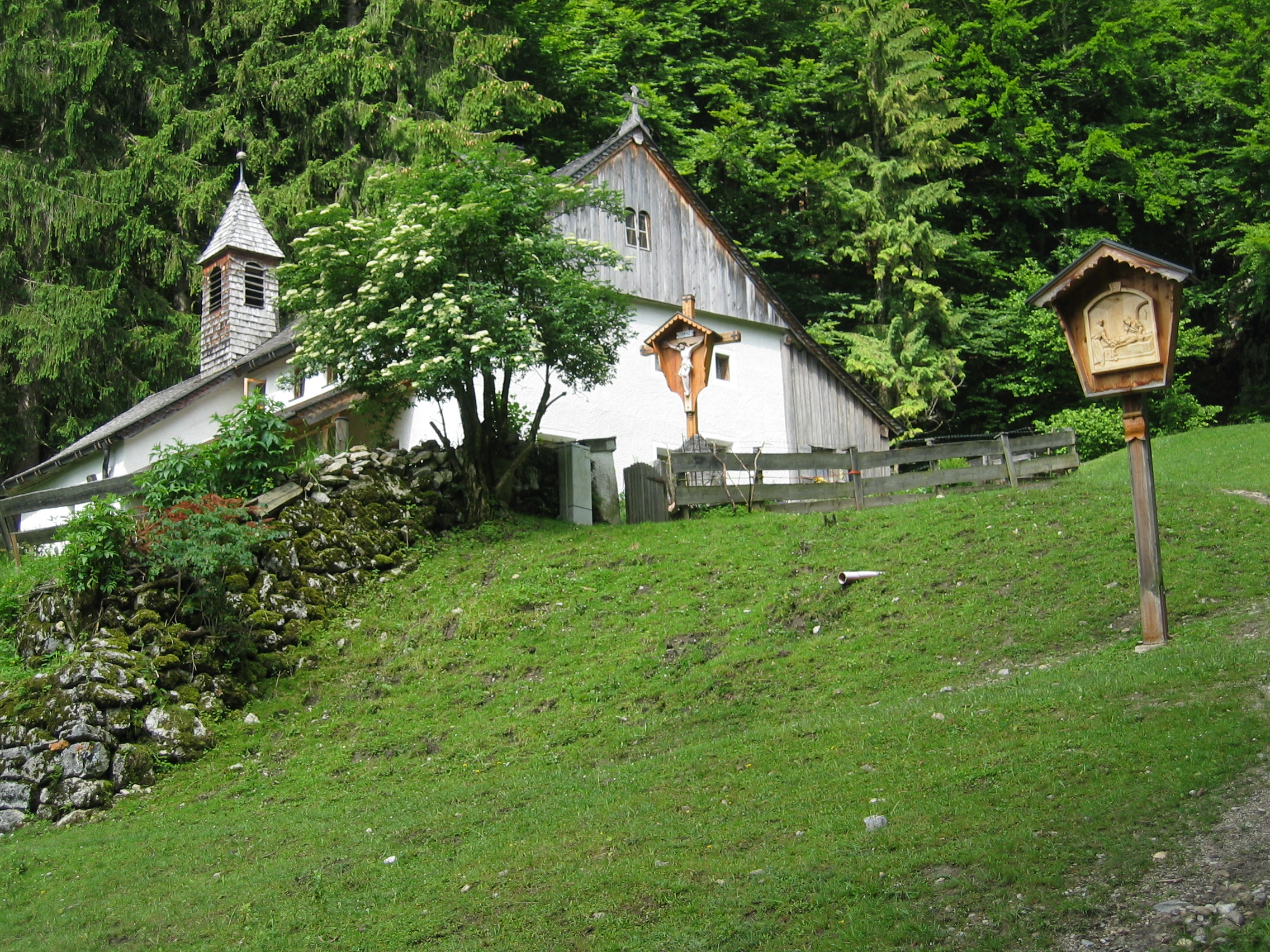
The hermitage of Maria Blut in St. Johann in Tirol

Consecrated life (also known as religious life) is a state of life in liturgical branches of Christianity (particularly Catholicism, Evangelical Lutheranism, and Anglicanism) lived by those faithful who are called to follow Jesus Christ in a more exacting way. Consecrated life includes individuals living as hermits or consecrated virgins, and those in institutes of consecrated life (religious and secular), and in societies of apostolic life.

== Definition ==
According to the Catechism of the Catholic Church, consecrated life "is characterized by the public profession of the evangelical counsels of poverty, chastity, and obedience, in a stable state of life recognized by the Church".

The Code of Canon Law defines it as "a stable form of living by which the faithful, following Christ more closely under the action of the Holy Spirit, are totally dedicated to God who is loved most of all, so that, having been dedicated by a new and special title to his honour, to the building up of the Church, and to the salvation of the world, they strive for the perfection of charity in the service of the kingdom of God and, having been made an outstanding sign in the Church, foretell the heavenly glory."

== Description ==
Consecrated life is a more exacting way of Christian life because it entails public profession of religious vows or other sacred bonds, whereby the consecrated person commits, for love of God, to observe as binding the evangelical counsels of chastity, poverty, and obedience; or, in the case of a consecrated virgin, a holy resolution (sanctum propositum) of perpetual virginity and a life of prayer and service to the Church; which vows or bonds the Church publicly accepts.

The Catechism of the Catholic Church states that "from the very beginning of the Church there were men and women who set out to follow Christ with greater liberty, and to imitate him more closely, by practising the evangelical counsels. They led lives dedicated to God, each in his own way. Many of them, under the inspiration of the Holy Spirit, became hermits or founded religious families. Thus the Church, by virtue of her authority, gladly accepted and approved them." The primary text setting out the Catholic Church's theology of the consecrated life is in chapter VI of the Second Vatican Council's Dogmatic Constitution on the Church (1964), which explains that "through Baptism a person dies to sin and is consecrated to God", but "in order that he [or she] may be capable of deriving more abundant fruit from this baptismal grace, he intends, by the profession of the evangelical counsels in the Church, to free himself from those obstacles, which might draw him away from the fervor of charity and the perfection of divine worship". The same text affirms that the purpose of the religious state is "to free its members from earthly cares".

The Benedictine and Carthusian vows of stability, conversion of manners/life, and obedience are equivalent to the more common vows of other religious institutes. Depending on their specific vocation, members of some religious institutes may also profess a fourth vow.

Consecrated lives may be lived either in institutes, societies, or individually. While those living it are either clergy or laity, the state of consecrated life is not specifically clerical or lay by nature. Members of consecrated life are not necessarily part of their Church hierarchies (such as the hierarchy of the Catholic Church or the hierarchies of the Evangelical-Lutheran Churches).

== Types ==
=== Institutes of consecrated life ===
Institutes of consecrated life are either religious institutes or secular institutes.

- Religious institutes are societies in which their members, according to proper law, pronounce public vows, and lead a life as brothers or sisters in common.
- Secular institutes are those "in which the Christian faithful, living in the world, strive for the perfection of charity and work for the sanctification of the world especially from within." Therefore, their members usually are not bound to live in community together, yet still profess the evangelical counsels.

=== Societies of apostolic life ===
Societies of apostolic life are dedicated to pursuit of an apostolic purpose, such as educational or missionary work. They "resemble institutes of consecrated life" but are distinct from them. The members do not take religious vows, but live in common, striving for perfection through observing the "constitutions" of the society to which they belong. Some societies of apostolic life, but not all of them, define in their constitutions "bonds" of a certain permanence whereby their members embrace the evangelical counsels.

The Code of Canon Law gives for societies of apostolic life regulations much less detailed than for institutes of consecrated life, in many instances simply referring to the constitutions of the individual societies. Although societies of apostolic life may in externals resemble religious institutes, a major distinction is that their members are not themselves consecrated and their state of life does not change (i.e. they technically remain secular clerics or laypersons).

Examples of societies of apostolic life are the Oratory of Saint Philip Neri, the Daughters of Charity of Saint Vincent de Paul, and the Society of the Priests of Saint Sulpice, the Society of St Joseph of the Sacred Heart and the Missionary Society of St. Columban.

=== Other forms ===
Besides institutes of consecrated life, the Catholic Church recognizes:

- The eremitic life, also known as the anchoritic life, "by which the Christian faithful devote their life to the praise of God and salvation of the world through a stricter separation from the world, the silence of solitude and assiduous prayer and penance." Apart from hermits in religious orders, the Catholic Church law recognizes as a diocesan hermit "one dedicated to God in a consecrated life if he or she publicly professes the three evangelical counsels, confirmed by a vow or other sacred bond, in the hands of the diocesan bishop, and observes his or her own plan of life under his direction." "They manifest to everyone the interior aspect of the mystery of the Church, that is, personal intimacy with Christ. Hidden from the eyes of men, the life of the hermit is a silent preaching of the Lord, to whom he has surrendered his life simply because he is everything to him. Here is a particular call to find in the desert, in the thick of spiritual battle, the glory of the Crucified One."
- Consecrated virgins who "expressing the holy resolution of following Christ more closely, are consecrated to God by the diocesan Bishop according to the approved liturgical rite, are mystically betrothed to Christ, the Son of God, and are dedicated to the service of the Church." These virgins are, as well as hermits, one of oldest forms of consecrated life.
- Consecrated widows seek to live a life of simplicity and humility. Pope John Paul II's post-synodal apostolic exhortation Vita consecrata of 25 March 1996 said: "Again being practised today is the consecration of widows, known since apostolic times (cf. 1 Tim 5:5, 9–10; 1 Cor 7:8) as well as the consecration of widowers. These women and men, through a vow of perpetual chastity as a sign of the Kingdom of God, consecrate their state of life in order to devote themselves to prayer and the service of the Church." Although the Latin Church has no specific liturgical rite for the consecration of widows, the Code of Canons of the Eastern Churches envisages individual eastern Churches choosing to have consecrated widows.
- The Code of Canon Law and the Code of Canons of the Eastern Churches state that any approval of new forms of consecrated life is reserved only to the Apostolic See.

== History ==
=== Eremitic life ===
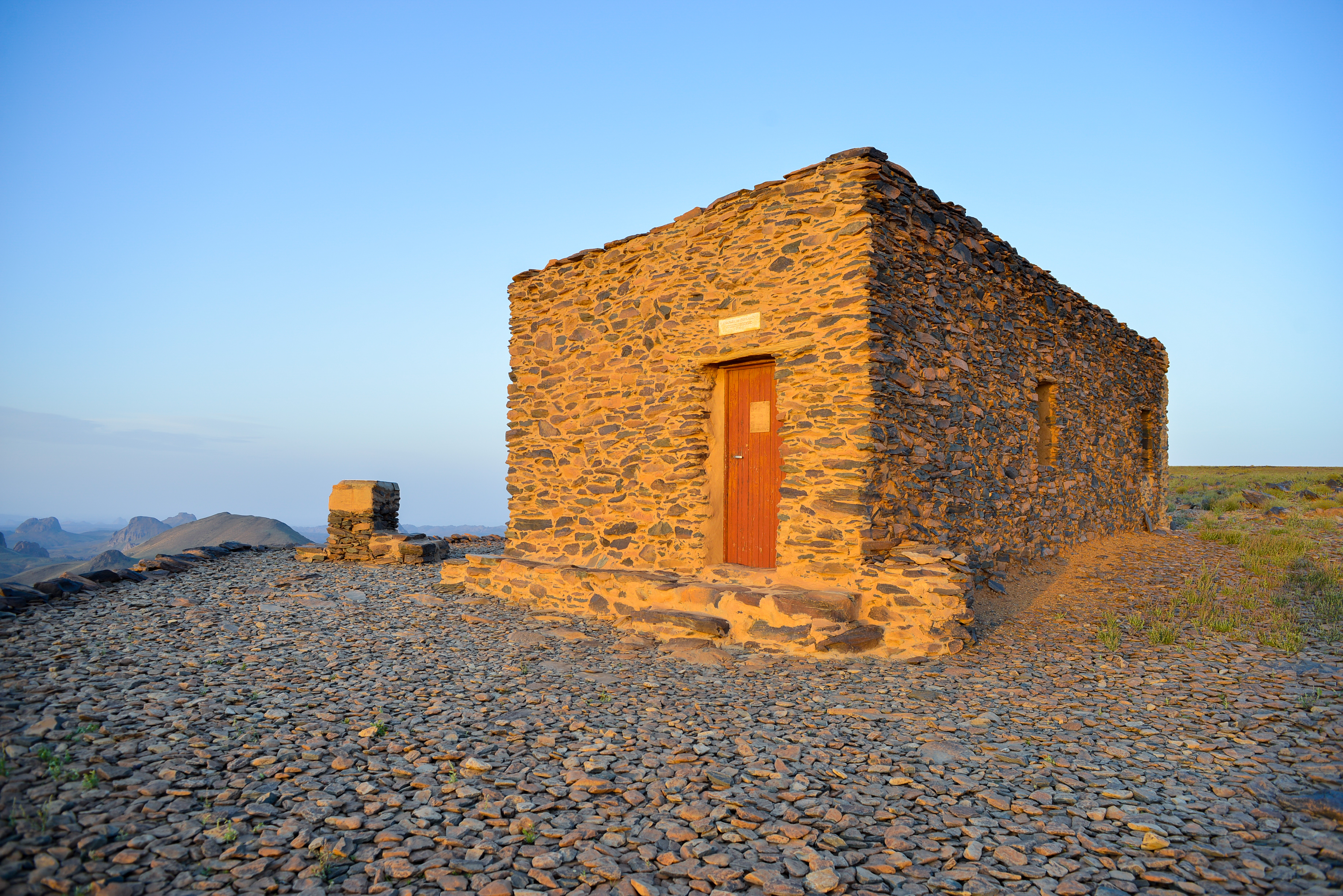
Hermitage used by Catholic hermit Charles de Foucauld in the Hoggar (Algeria)

When Constantine the Great was legalizing Christianity in the Roman Empire in the early 4th century, and the Christian faith became the favoured religion, it lost the self-sacrificing character that had profoundly marked it in the age of Roman persecution. In response to the loss of martyrdom for the sake of the Kingdom of God, some of the very devout men and women left the cities for the testings of the life in the desert that was meant to lead the individual back into a more intimate relationship with God, just like the wandering of the Israelites in the Wilderness of Sin. The Greek word for desert, eremos, gave this form of religious living the name eremitic (or eremitical) life, and the person leading it the name hermit. Anthony the Great and other early leaders provided guidance to less experienced hermits, and there were soon a large number of Christian hermits, particularly in the desert of Egypt and in parts of Syria.

Though the eremitic life would eventually be overshadowed by the far more numerous vocations to the cenobitic life, it did survive. The Middle Ages saw the emergence of a variant of the hermit, the anchorite; and life in Carthusian and Camaldolese monasteries has an eremitic emphasis. The Greek Orthodox and the Russian Orthodox Churches have their own eremitic traditions, of which Mount Athos is perhaps the most widely heard of today.

The Code of Canon Law 1983 recognises as diocesan hermits persons who - without being members of a religious institute - publicly profess the three evangelical counsels, confirmed by vow or other sacred bond in the hands of their respective diocesan bishop, as Christian faithful that live the consecrated life (cf. canon 603, see also below).

=== Religious orders ===
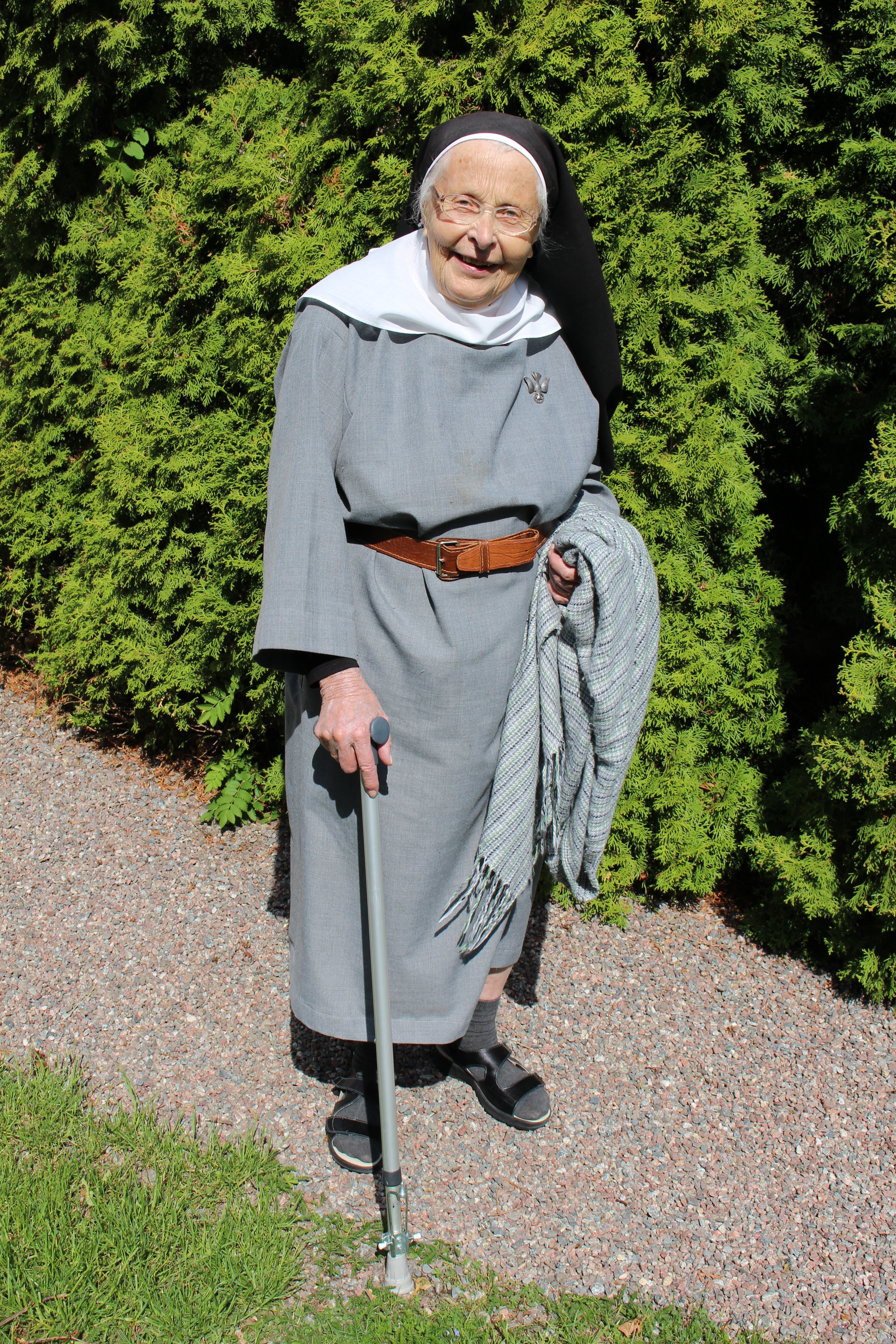
The Evangelical-Lutheran nuns of the Order of the Holy Spirit wear a grey habit with a dove lapel pin (the nuns are standing in the rear of this procession at Alsike Church). Depicted is Sr. Marianne Nordström, who founded Alsike Convent.

==== Monastic orders ====
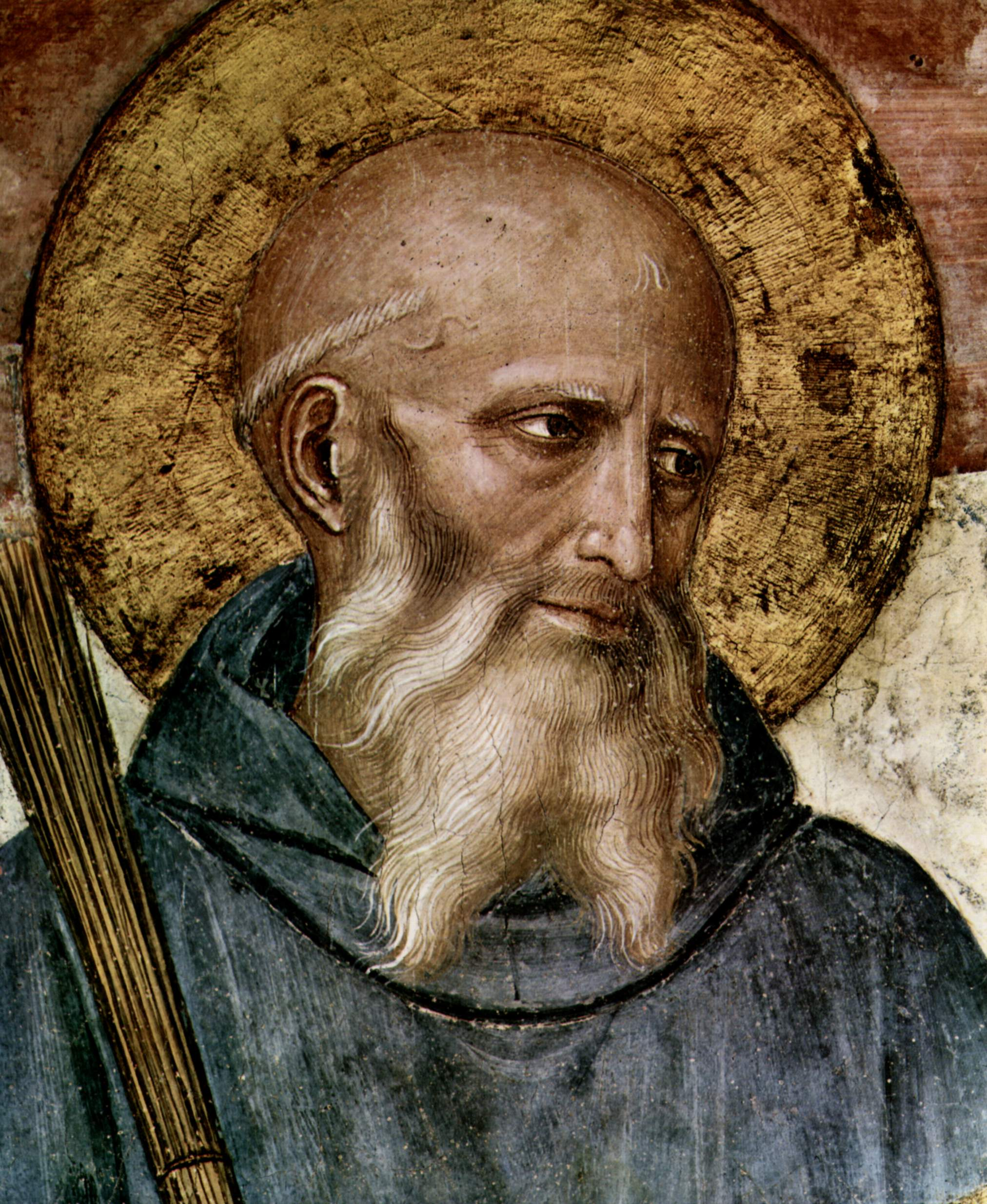
Benedict of Nursia (c. 480–543), who wrote the leading religious rule for monastic living, "evokes the Christian roots of Europe", said Pope Benedict XVI.

The eremitic life was apparently healthy for some, but led to imbalance in others. Pachomius the Great, a near-contemporary of Anthony the Great, recognised that some monks needed the guidance and rhythm of a community (cenobium). He is generally credited with founding, in Egypt, the first community of monks, thus launching cenobitic monasticism.

Basil of Caesarea in the East in the 4th century, and Benedict of Nursia in the West in the 6th century, authored the most influential "rules" for religious living in their areas of the Christian world ("rule" in this sense refers to a collection of precepts, compiled as guidelines for how to follow the spiritual life). They organized a common life with a daily schedule of prayer, work, spiritual reading and rest.

Almost all monasteries in the Eastern Catholic Churches and in the Eastern Orthodox Church today follow the Rule of St Basil. The Rule of St Benedict is followed by a variety of orders of monastics in the West, including the Order of Saint Benedict, Cistercians, Trappists, and Camaldolese, and is an important influence in Carthusian life.

==== Canons regular ====
Canons regular are members of certain bodies of priests living in community under the Augustinian Rule (regula in Latin), and sharing their property in common. Distinct from monks, who live a cloistered, contemplative life and sometimes engage in ministry to those from outside the monastery, canons devote themselves to public ministry of liturgy and sacraments for those who visit their churches.

Historically, monastic life was by its nature lay, but canonical life was essentially clerical.

==== Mendicant orders ====
Around the 13th century during the rise of the medieval towns and cities the mendicant orders developed. While the monastic foundations were rural institutions marked by a retreat from secular society, the mendicants were urban foundations organized to engage secular city life and to meet some of its needs such as education and service to the poor. The five primary mendicant religious Order of the 13th century are the Order of Preachers (the Dominicans), Order of Friars Minor (the Franciscans), Order of the Servants of Mary (Servite Order), Order of St. Augustine (the Augustinians) and the Order of Our Lady of Mount Carmel (the Carmelites).

=== Congregations ===
Until the 16th century recognition was granted only to institutes with solemn vows. By the constitution Inter cetera of 20 January 1521, Pope Leo X appointed a rule for tertiaries with simple vows. Under this rule, enclosure was optional, enabling non-enclosed followers of the rule to engage in various works of charity not allowed to enclosed religious. In 1566 and 1568, Pope Pius V rejected this classification, but their presence was tolerated and they continued to increase in number. Their lives were oriented toward social service and to evangelization in Europe and mission areas. The number of these congregations increased further in the upheavals brought by the French Revolution and subsequent Napoleonic invasions of other Catholic countries, depriving thousands of monks and nuns of the income that their communities held because of inheritances and forcing them to find a new way of living their religious life. On 8 December 1900, they were approved and recognised as religious.

The Society of Jesus is an example of an institute that obtained recognition as a religious order with solemn vows, although the members were divided into the professed with solemn vows (a minority) and the "coadjutors" with simple vows. It was founded in the wake of the Protestant Reformation, introducing several innovations designed to meet the demands of the 16th century crisis. Its members were freed from the commitments of common life, especially the common prayer, which allowed them to minister individually in distant places. Their unusually long formation, typically thirteen years, prepared them to represent the intellectual tradition of the Church even in isolation.

=== Secular institutes ===
Secular institutes have their modern beginnings in 18th-century France. During the French Revolution, the government attempted to dechristianise France. The French government had required all priests and bishops to swear an oath of fidelity to the new order or face dismissal from the Church, and had forbidden any form of religious life. Fr Pierre-Joseph de Clorivière, a Jesuit, founded a new society of diocesan priests, the Institute of the Heart of Jesus. He also founded the Daughters of the Heart of Mary (French: Société des Filles du Coeur de Marie). While living a life of perfection, they did not take vows, remaining a secular institute to avoid being considered a religious society by the government. They would eventually receive pontifical institute status in 1952. The Daughters of the Heart of Mary, though resembling a secular institute in some ways, were recognized as an institute of religious life. On 2 February 1947 Pope Pius XII issued the apostolic constitution Provida Mater Ecclesia recognizing secular institutes as "a new category of the state of perfection" (Latin: nova categoria status perfectionis). The 1983 Code of Canon Law recognizes secular institutes as a form of consecrated life. They differ from religious institutes in that their members live their lives in the ordinary conditions of the world, either alone, in their families or in fraternal groups.

== Discernment for a vocation in consecrated life ==
In certain branches of Christianity (particularly Catholicism, Evangelical-Lutheranism, and Anglicanism) individuals are called to discern their vocation for their life, which includes consideration of the consecrated life. Those that are considering becoming monastics (such as a monk or nun) may become postulants, which is often one year.

Individuals who do not wish to take religious vows (such as those of poverty, chastity and obedience) may desire to attach themselves to a monastery or convent to practice certain aspects of monastic life; they able to do so as an oblate (for Benedictine communities) or as a tertiary (for Franciscan communities).

== World Day for Consecrated Life ==
In 1997, Pope John Paul II instituted the World Day of Prayer for Consecrated Life, fixed annually on 2 February, the feast of the Presentation of the Lord.

== See also ==
- Christian monasticism
- Congregation for Institutes of Consecrated Life and Societies of Apostolic Life
- Enclosed religious orders
- Institute of consecrated life
- List of religious institutes
- Monasticism
- Religious institute (Catholic)
- Vocational discernment in the Catholic Church
