= Daughters of Mary (Lutheran) =

Mariadöttrarna av den Evangeliska Mariavägen (Daughters of Mary of the Evangelical Way of Mary) is an Evangelical Lutheran religious order for women in the Church of Sweden, with chapters also in Kruså in Denmark and in Naantali in Finland.

The order was founded by Paulina Mariadotter (Gunvor Paulina Norrman 1903–1985) in 1958. Swedish communities of the order live in Vallby near Enköping and in Malmö.

Sisters wear blue habit and make vows of poverty, chastity and obedience.

The Daughters of Mary is an Evangelical-Lutheran religious order of sisters who follow the example of the Blessed Virgin Mary. One branch of the order, the community in Vadstena, has adopted the rule of St Benedict and since 1988 belonged to the Roman Catholic Church.
