= List of compositions by Ned Rorem =

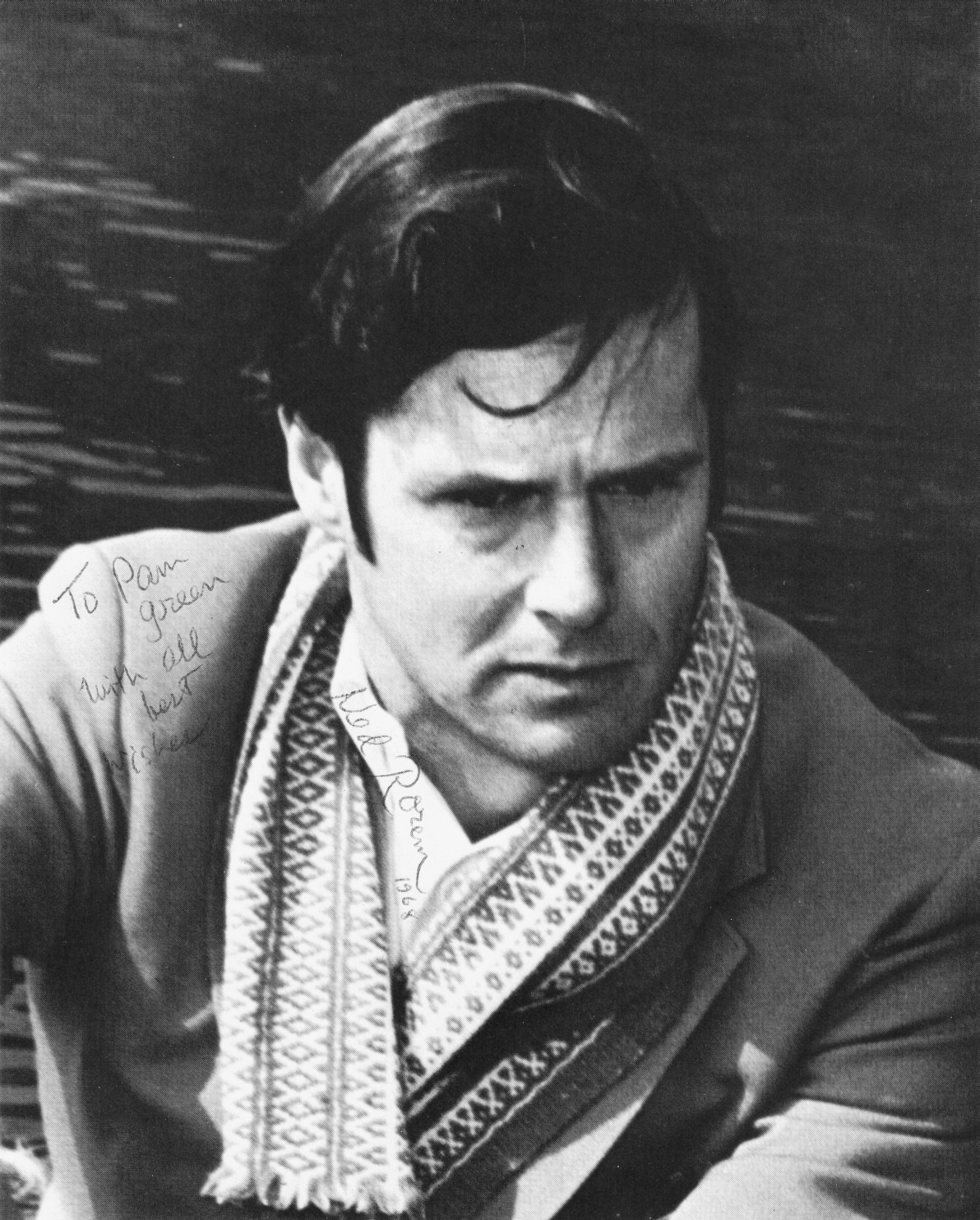
Ned Rorem in 1968

Ned Rorem (1923–2022) was an American composer of contemporary classical music. Though best known for his many songs, his compositions also include operas, concertante, piano music as well as choral, chamber and orchestral works.

== List of compositions ==
=== Operas ===
- A Childhood Miracle, 1951, opera in one act
- The Robbers, (1956), one-act opera
- The Anniversary (1961), one-act opera
- Miss Julie (1965)
- Hearing (1966–1976), opera in five scenes
- Bertha (1968), opera in one act
- The Three Sisters Who Are Not Sisters (1968), three-act opera
- Fables (1971), five very short operas to poems by Jean de la Fontaine:
  - The Animals Sick of the Plague
  - The Bird Wounded by an Arrow
  - The Fox and the Grapes
  - The Lion in Love
  - The Sun and the Frogs
- Our Town (2005)

=== Orchestral works ===
- Piano Concerto No. 1 (1948), for piano & orchestra (withdrawn)
- From an Unknown Past (1950), for voice & orchestra
- Symphony No. 1 (1950)
- Piano Concerto No. 2 (1951), for piano & orchestra
- Design (1953)
- Poèmes pour la paix (1953–1956), for voice & string orchestra
- Symphony No. 2 (1956)
- Sinfonia (1957), for orchestral winds with optional timpani, percussion and piano/celeste
- Symphony No. 3 (1958)
- Eagles (1958)
- Pilgrims (1958), for string orchestra
- Ideas (1961), for chamber/youth orchestra
- Lions (A Dream) (1963), for jazz quartet & orchestra
- Sun (1966), for high voice & orchestra
- Water Music (1966), for clarinet, violin & orchestra
- Concerto in Six Movements (Piano Concerto No. 3) (1969), for piano & orchestra
- Air Music (1974)
- Assembly and Fall (1975), for oboe, trumpet, timpani, viola & orchestra
- A Quaker Reader (1976–1988), for chamber orchestra
- Sunday Morning (1977)
- Remembering Tommy (1979), for piano, cello & orchestra
- After Long Silence (1982), for voice, oboe & strings
- Violin Concerto (1984), for violin & orchestra
- Organ Concerto (1985), for organ & chamber orchestra
- String Symphony (1985), for string orchestra
- Frolic (1986)
- The Schuyler Songs (1987), for soprano & orchestra
- Fantasy and Polka (1989)
- Swords and Plowshares (1990), for four solo voices & orchestra
- Piano Concerto No. 4 (1991), for piano (left hand) & orchestra
- Concerto for English Horn (1991–1992), for English horn & orchestra
- Triptych (1992), for chamber orchestra
- More Than A Day (1995), for soprano/countertenor & chamber orchestra
- Waiting (1996)
- Double Concerto (1998), for violin, cello & orchestra
- Cello Concerto (2002), for cello & orchestra
- Flute Concerto (2002), for flute & orchestra
- Mallet Concerto (2003), for percussion & orchestra
- Eleven Songs for Susan (2007), for mezzo-soprano & chamber orchestra
- Songs Old and New (2008), for soprano & orchestra

=== Chamber ===
- Concertino de Camera (1946), for harpsichord & small ensemble
- Mountain Song (1948), for flute/oboe/violin/cello & piano
- Violin Sonata (1948), for violin & piano
- Dance Suite (1949), for two pianos
- Sicilienne (1950), for two pianos
- Eleven Studies for Eleven Players (1959–1960), for large ensemble
- Trio (1960), for flute, cello & piano
- Lovers (1964), for harpsichord, oboe, cello & percussion
- Day Music (1971), for violin & piano
- Night Music (1972), for violin & piano
- Solemn Prelude (1973), for eleven brass
- Book of Hours (1975), for flute & harp
- Romeo and Juliet (1977), for flute & guitar
- Three Slow Pieces (1978), for cello & piano
- Whales, Weep Not! (1978), for flute & piano
- Winter Pages (1981), for clarinet, bassoon, violin, cello & piano
- Picnic on the Marne (1983), for alto saxophone & piano
- Dances (1984), for cello & piano
- Septet Scenes from Childhood (1984–1985), for oboe, horn, piano & string quartet
- The End of Summer (1985), for violin, clarinet & piano
- Bright Music (1987), for flute, two violins, cello & piano
- Fanfare and Flourish (1988), for two trumpets, two trombones & organ
- Diversions (1990), for brass quintet
- Spring Music (1990), for piano trio
- String Quartet No. 3 (1991)
- Songs of Sadness (1994), for voice, guitar, cello & clarinet
- String Quartet No. 4 (1994)
- Six Variations (1995), for two pianos – four hands
- Autumn Music (1996–1997), for violin & piano
- An Oboe Book (1999), for oboe & piano
- Cries and Whispers (2000), for trumpet & piano
- Nine Episodes for Four Players (2001), for clarinet, violin, cello & piano
- United States – Seven Viewpoints (2001), for string quartet
- Pas de Trois (2002), for oboe, violin & piano
- The Unquestioned Answer (2002), for flute, two violins, cello & piano
- Four Colours (2003), for clarinet & piano
- Yesterday, Today and Tomorrow (2004), for piano quartet
- Four Prayers (2006), for flute & piano
- Nocturne (2007), for double bass & piano
- A Little Fantasy (2008), for cello & piano

=== Vocal ===
- Two Poems of Edith Sitwell (1948), for medium-high voice & piano
- Requiem (1948), for voice & piano
- From an Unknown Past (1950), for voice & piano/orchestra
- Cycle of Holy Songs (1951), for voice & piano
- Flight for Heaven (1952), song-cycle for voice & piano
- Four Dialogues (1953–1954), for soprano, tenor, & two pianos
- Three Poems for Demetrios Capetanakis (1954), for voice & piano
- Poèmes pour la paix (1953–1956), for medium voice & strings
- Five Poems of Walt Whitman (1957), for voice & piano
- Two Poems of Theodore Roethke (1959) for voice & piano
- King Midas (1961), cantata for voice(s) & piano
- Four Poems of Tennyson (1963), for voice & piano
- Poems of Love and the Rain (1963), song-cycle for mezzo-soprano & piano
- Sun (1966), for high voice & orchestra
- Some Trees (1968), for soprano, mezzo-soprano, bass-baritone, & piano
- War Scenes (1969), for medium-low voice & piano
- Gloria (1970), for two solo voices & piano
- Ariel (1971), for soprano, clarinet & piano
- Last Poems of Wallace Stevens (1971–1972), for voice, cello, & piano
- Serenade on Five English Poems (1975), for mezzo-soprano, violin, viola, & piano
- Women's Voices (1975–1976), for soprano & piano (commissioned by Joyce Mathis)
- The Nantucket Songs (1979), for high voice & piano
- Santa Fe Songs (1980), for baritone, string trio, & piano
- After Long Silence (1982), for soprano, oboe, & strings
- Three Calamus Poems (1982), for baritone & piano
- The Schuyler Songs (1987), for soprano & orchestra
- The Auden Poems (1989), for tenor & piano trio
- Swords and Plowshares (1990), for solo voices & orchestra
- My Sad Captains (1995), for soprano, alto, tenor, bass, & piano
- Evidence of Things Not Seen (1997), thirty-six songs for soprano, alto, tenor, baritone, & piano
- Another Sleep (2000), song-cycle for medium voice & piano
- Two Sermons (2001), for voice, clarinet, violin, double bass & piano
- Aftermath (2001–02), song-cycle for baritone, violin, cello, & piano
- Sound the Flute (2004), for high voice, recorder & piano
- Eleven Songs for Susan (2007), for mezzo-soprano & chamber orchestra
- Three Poems of Edna St. Vincent Millay (2007), for voice & piano
- Songs Old and New (2008), for soprano & orchestra
- Four Sonnets of Shakespeare (2008), for tenor & piano
- Sonnet 144 (Two Loves I Have) (2010), for soprano, mezzo-soprano, & piano

=== Songs ===
Rorem's songs are with piano accompaniment, except where stated otherwise:

- "Alleluia" (1946)
- "Spring and Fall" (1946)
- "Spring" (1947)
- "Stopping by Woods on a Snowy Evening" (1947)
- "The Lordly Hudson" (1947)
- "Echo's Song" (1948)
- "Little Elegy" (1949)
- "Rain in Spring" (1949)
- "The Silver Swan" (1949)
- "The Sleeping Palace" (1949)
- "What If Some Little Pain" (1949)
- "Upon Julia's Clothes" (1950)
- "Lullaby of the Woman of the Mountain" (1950)
- "To the Willow Tree" (1950)
- "Love in a Life" (1951)
- "O Do Not Love Too Long" (1951)
- "The Call" (1951)
- "The Nightingale" (1951)
- "To a Young Girl" (1951)
- "A Christmas Carol" (1952)
- "Clouds" (1953)
- "Cradle Song" (1953)
- "For Susan" (1953)
- "In a Gondola" (1953)
- "Love" (1953)
- "Ode" (1953)
- "Pippa's Song" (1953)
- "Sally's Smile" (1953)
- "Song for a Girl" (1953)
- "The Tulip Tree" (1953)
- "The Midnight Sun" (1953)
- "Early in the Morning" (1954)
- "Youth, Day, Old Age and Night" (1954)
- "I Am Rose" (1955)
- "I Will Always Love You" (1955)
- "See How They Love Me" (1956)
- "What Sparks and Wiry Cries" (1956)
- "Conversation" (1957)
- "Gliding O'er All" (1957)
- "Gods" (1957)
- "Look Down, Fair Moon" (1957)
- "O You to Whom I Often and Silently Come" (1957)
- "Reconciliation" (1957)
- "Sometimes With One I Love" (1957)
- "Such Beauty as Hurts to Behold" (1957)
- "To You" (1957)
- "Visits to St. Elizabeth's" (1957)
- "I Strolled Across an Open Field" (1959)
- "Memory" (1959)
- "My Papa's Waltz" (1959)
- "Night Crow" (1959)
- "Orchids" (1959)
- "Root Cellar" (1959)
- "Snake" (1959)
- "The Waking" (1959)
- "Do I love you more than a day?" (1962)
- "Ask Me No More" (1963)
- "Far-Far-Away" (1963)
- "For Poulenc" (1963)
- "Now Sleeps the Crimson Petal" (1963)
- "The Sleeping Palace" (1963)
- "That Shadow, My Likeness" (1963)
- "To You" (1970)
- "Trickle Drops" (1970)
- "The Serpent" (1972)
- "We Never Said Farewell" (1975–76)
- "A Journey" (1976)
- "Ferry me across the water" (1978)
- "From When Cometh Song?" (1978)
- "The Dance" (1978)
- "Nantucket" (1978–79)
- "Go, Lovely Rose" (1979)
- "The Dancer" (1979)
- "Up-Hill" (1979)
- "Back to Life" (1980) [accomp. double bass]
- "Sonnet" (1980) [accomp. piano quartet]
- "The Sowers" (1980) [accomp. piano quartet]
- "The Wintry Mind" (1980)
- "Let's Take a Walk" (1981)
- "Anna la Bonne" (1989)
- "Are You the New Person?" (1989)
- "Full of Life Now" (1989)
- "I Will Always Love You" (1990)
- "A Dream of Nightingales" (1992)
- "Their Lonely Betters" (1992)
- "Somewhere..." (1994)
- "Three Women" (1994)
- "Remembrance of Things Past" (1998)
- "Chromatic Fantasy" (2001)
- "He Will Not Hear" (2001)
- "I Never Knew" (2001)
- "The End" (2003)
- "While Sodom Was Occupied" (2004)
- "The Stars Have Not Dealt" (2007)
- "A Poison Tree" (2007)
- "Death and the Young Man" (2007)
- "Wild Nights" (2007)
- "How Like a Winter" (2013) [accomp. double bass]

=== Choral ===
- The Seventieth Psalm (1943), for S.A.T.B. choir & wind ensemble
- A Sermon on Miracles (1947), for soprano solo, unison choir & strings
- Four Madrigals (1947), for a cappella S.A.T.B. choir
- Three Incantations from a Marionette Tale (1948), for unison choir & piano
- From an Unknown Past (1950), for S.A.T.B. choir a cappella
- I Feel Death... (1953), for three-part a cappella male choir
- The Poets' Requiem (1954–55), soprano solo, S.A.T.B. choir & orchestra
- All Glorious God (1955), for a cappella S.A.T.B. choir
- Sing, My Soul, His Wondrous Love (1955), for a cappella S.A.T.B. choir
- Miracles of Christmas (1959), for S.A.T.B. choir & organ
- Prayers and Responses (1960), for a cappella S.A.T.B. choir
- Virelai (1961), for a cappella S.A.T.B. choir
- Two Psalms and a Proverb (1962), for S.A.T.B. choir & string quartet
- Lift up your Heads (The Ascension) (1963), for S.A.T.B. choir, eight wind, nine brass & timpani
- Laudemus Tempus Actum (1964), for S.A.T.B. choir & orchestra
- Letters from Paris (1966), for S.A.T.B. choir & orchestra
- Love Divine, All Loves Excelling (1966), for a cappella S.A.T.B. choir
- Proper for the Votive Mass of the Holy Spirit (1966), for unison choir & organ
- Truth in the Night Season (1966), for S.A.T.B. choir & organ
- He Shall Rule from Sea to Sea (1967), for S.A.T.B. choir & organ
- Praises for the Nativity (1970), for soprano, alto, tenor & bass soli, S.A.T.B. choir & organ
- Canticle of the Lamb (1971), for a cappella S.A.T.B. choir
- Canticles: Sets 1 & 2 (1971–72), for a cappella S.A.T.B. choir
- Four Hymns (1973), for S.A.T.B. choir & keyboard
- In Time of Pestilence (1973), for a cappella S.A.T.B. choir
- Little Prayers (1973), for soprano & baritone soli, S.A.T.B. choir & orchestra
- Missa Brevis (1973), for soprano, alto, tenor & bass soli, & S.A.T.B. choir
- Prayer to Jesus (1973), for a cappella S.A.T.B. choir
- Three Motets (1973), for S.A.T.B. choir & organ
- Three Prayers (1973), for a cappella S.A.T.B. choir
- Surge Illuminare (1977), for S.A.T.B. choir & organ
- Three Choruses for Christmas (1978), for a cappella S.A.T.B. choir
- Give All to Love (1981), for two-part choir & piano
- Little Lamb, Who Made Thee? (1982), for S.A.T.B. choir & organ
- Praise the Lord, O My Soul (1982), for S.A.T.B. choir & organ
- An American Oratorio (1983), for tenor solo, S.A.T.B. choir & orchestra
- Mercy and Truth Are Met (1983), for S.A.T.B. choir & organ
- Whitman Cantata (1983), for S.A.T.B. choir, brass ensemble & timpani
- Pilgrim Strangers (1984), for six a cappella male voices
- Before the Morning Star (1986), for a cappella S.A.T.B. choir
- Homer (1986), for S.A.T.B. choir & ensemble
- Seven Motets for the Church Year (1986), for a cappella S.A.T.B. choir
- Three Poems of Baudelaire (1986), for a cappella S.A.T.B. choir
- Te Deum (1986–87), for S.A.T.B. choir, two trumpets, two trombones & organ
- Five Armenian Love Songs (1987), for a cappella S.A.T.B. choir
- The Death of Moses (1987), for S.A.T.B. choir & organ
- What is Pink? (1987), for treble choir & piano
- Goodbye My Fancy (1988), for alto & baritone soli, S.A.T.B. choir & orchestra
- Lead Kindly Light (1988), for a cappella S.A.T.B. choir
- Breathe On Me (1989), for a cappella S.A.T.B. choir
- Love Alone (1989), for male-voice choir & piano duet
- Christ is Made the Sure Foundation (1992), for S.A.T.B. choir & organ
- Festival Alleluia (1992), for a cappella S.A.T.B. choir
- O God, My Heart is Ready (1992), for S.A.T.B. choir & organ
- Spirit Divine (1992), for S.A.T.B. choir & organ
- Present Laughter (1993), for S.A.T.B. choir, brass quintet & piano
- How Lovely is your Dwelling Place (1994), for S.A.T.B. choir & piano/organ
- Exaltabo Te, Domine (1995), for S.A.T.B. choir & keyboard
- Four Introits (1999), for S.A.T.B. choir & keyboard
- We Are the Music Makers (2003), for S.A.T.B. choir & piano
- A Song of Hosea (2005), for S.A.T.B. choir & organ
- Four Sonnets (2005), for S.A.T.B. choir & piano
- Ode to Man (2005), for a cappella S.A.T.B. choir
- Afternoon on a Hill (2006), for two-part children's choir & piano
- Two Shakespearean Poems (2008), for S.A.T.B. choir & piano

=== Solo instrumental ===
- Fantasy and Toccata (1946), for organ
- Sonata No. 1 (1948), for piano
- A Quiet Afternoon (1948), for piano
- Barcarolles (1949), for piano
- Pastorale (1949), for organ
- Sonata No. 2 (1949), for piano
- Sonata No. 3 (1954), for piano
- Slow Waltz (1958), for piano
- Spiders (1968), for harpsichord
- Eight Etudes (1975), for piano
- A Quaker Reader (1976), for organ
- Sky Music (1976), for harp
- After Reading Shakespeare (1980), for cello
- Suite (1980), for guitar
- Views from the Oldest House (1981), for organ
- Song and Dance (1986), for piano
- For Shirley (1989), for piano duet
- Organbook I. (1989), for organ
- Organbook II. (1989), for organ
- Organbook III. (1989), for organ
- Six Pieces (1997), for organ
- 99 Notes for the Millennium (1999), for piano
- For Ben (1999), for piano
- Recalling (2003), for piano
- Soundpoints (2003), for piano
- For Barbara (2006), for piano
- For Don (2006), for piano
- For Marian (2006), for piano
- For Mary (2006), for piano
- For Rosemary (2006), for piano
- 75 Notes for Jerry (2007), for piano
- Recalling Nadia (2014), for organ

== Sources ==
- Holmes, James (2003) [2001]. "Rorem, Ned". Grove Music Online. Revised by Anthony Tommasini and Arlys McDonald. Oxford: Oxford University Press. doi:10.1093/gmo/9781561592630.article.48611. (subscription, Wikilibrary access, or UK public library membership required)
