= Music Press =

Music publisher based in New York City

Music Press was a small music publishing firm based in New York City during the 1940s.

== History ==
Founded in 1940, Music Press was based in New York City's Steinway Building in Midtown Manhattan. Richard Dana, a descendant of Henry Wadsworth Longfellow and Richard Henry Dana Jr., founded the music publishing firm in 1940 with his cousin, the music librarian Carleton Sprague Smith. The publisher was a conservative representation of the field, and included a New York University composer and a Boston-based music critic among its leadership. Dana was an outsider to New York's music scene and worked to befriend the city's composers. World War II interrupted the publisher's activities. After the war, Music Press began musical imprints based on individual performers, such as John Kirkpatrick's selections for American Piano Music. In 1948, the Music Library Association recognized five Music Press-published works as among its top ten for the year, including Ned Rorem's "The Lordly Hudson". The firm was the first to publish Virgil Thomson and Gertrude Stein's operas Four Saints in Three Acts and The Mother of Us All.

The publisher was run on a small budget and only had a single staff member. Composers frequently moved between the small music presses of the period. Even with donations from patrons, the firm's financials grew dire by 1948 and the press resorted to passing publishing costs to a composer. With the conclusion that the press had printed too many works too fast, Dana stopped Music Press's publishing in April 1949. A West Coast distribution contract, while explored, did not save the company from revenue issues. Mercury Music acquired Music Press in December 1949.
