= Cello Concerto (Rorem) =

The Cello Concerto is a concerto for solo cello and orchestra by the American composer Ned Rorem. The work was commissioned by the Residentie Orchestra and the Kansas City Symphony for the cellist David Geringas. Its world premiere was given by Geringas and the Kansas City Symphony under the direction of Michael Stern on March 28, 2003.

== Composition ==
=== Background ===
In the score program notes, Rorem wrote, "When David Geringas came to visit in early 2000 I was pleased by his wish for a new piece. Since I already had a Violin Concerto, and a Double Concerto for Violin & Cello, a Cello Concerto would round off a perfect program." The composer began work on the concerto two years later, completing it during the summer of 2002.

=== Structure ===
The concerto has a duration of approximately 22 minutes and is cast in eight movements:

1. Curtain Raise
2. There and Back
3. Three Queries, One Response
4. Competitive Chaos
5. A Single Tone, A Dozen Implications
6. One Coin, Two Sides
7. Valse Rappelée
8. Adrift

=== Instrumentation ===
The work is scored for a solo cello and an orchestra consisting of two flutes, two oboes, two clarinets, two bassoons, two horns, two trumpets, timpani, harp, piano, and strings.

== Reception ==
The cello concerto has been praised by music critics. Reviewing a 2007 recording of the work, Bryce Morrison of Gramophone wrote, "In the Cello Concerto Rorem happily eschews a conventional form, giving programmatic subtitles to each section. These range from 'Curtain Raise' to 'Adrift', offering Wen-Sinn Yang a rich opportunity, whether playing primus inter pares or revelling in Rorem’s alternating nostalgia and effervescence. Finely recorded, it’s a clear winner for the Naxos American Classics series. Alex Ross of The New Yorker similarly observed, "The recent Cello Concerto nods several times to favorite predecessors—pealing, dissonant fanfares recall Messiaen; a kind of slide show of contrasting chords brings back the Interview Scene in Britten's Billy Budd—but it also includes three extended songs without words which could have been composed only by Rorem, each one sadder, lonelier, kindlier than the next."

== Recording ==
A recording of the concerto, performed by the cellist Wen-Sinn Yang and the Royal Scottish National Orchestra conducted by José Serebrier, was released through Naxos Records in September 2007. The album also features a performance of Rorem's Piano Concerto No. 2.
