= Air Music =

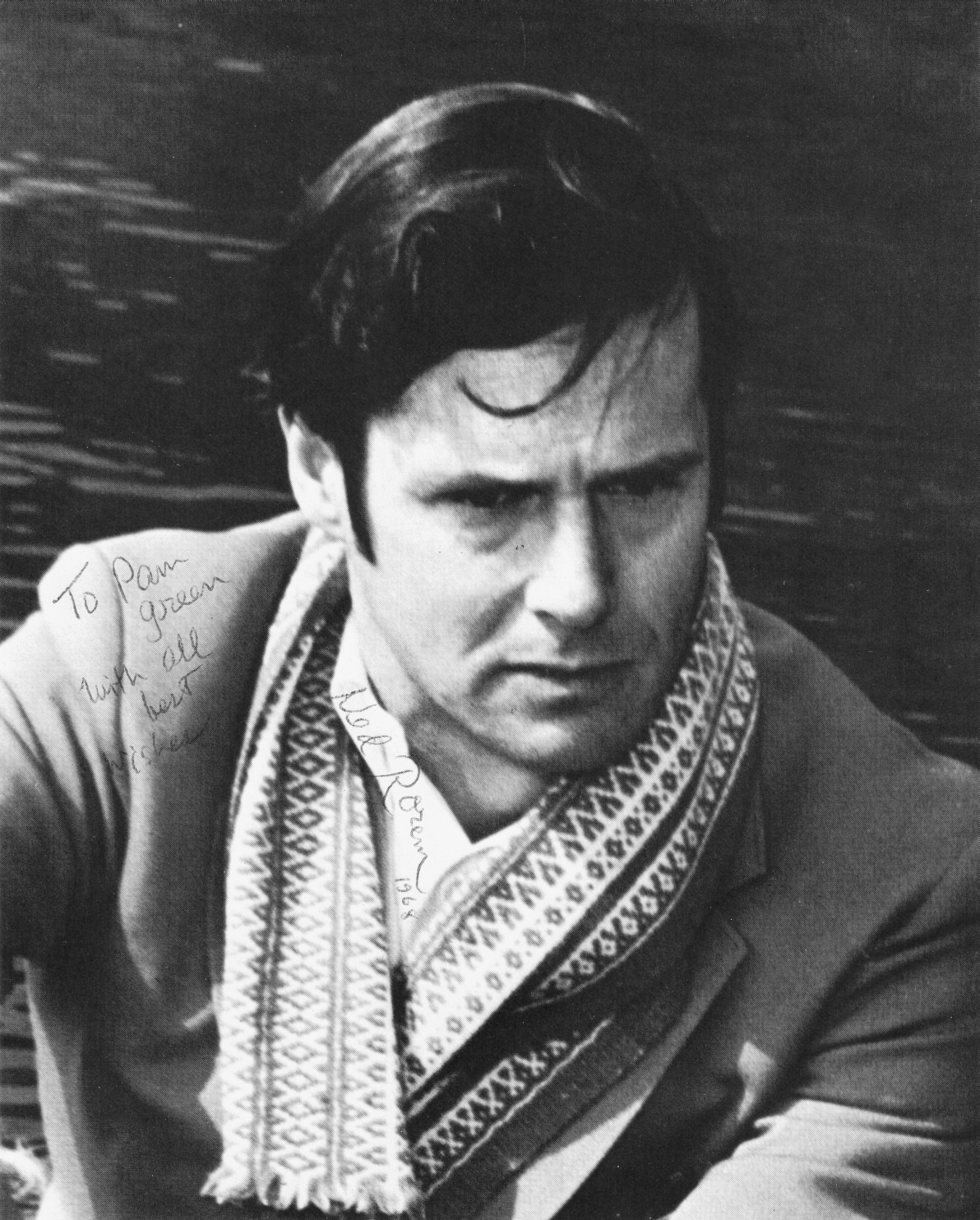
Ned Rorem in 1968

Air Music is a set of ten variations for orchestra by the American composer Ned Rorem. The work was completed in 1974 and was first performed by the Cincinnati Symphony Orchestra on December 5, 1975. The piece won the 1976 Pulitzer Prize for Music.

== Structure ==
Air Music has a duration of approximately 20 minutes and is cast in ten movements:

1. All players
2. All players
3. Woodwinds, piano and strings
4. Solo tuba and violin with flutes, oboes, English horn, contrabassoon, and violins
5. Three clarinets, three trumpets, snare drum, solo violin and strings pizzicato
6. Trombone and cello, with piano, violin, and violas
7. Flutes and violins
8. Solo viola with bassoon, four horns, and harp
9. Two oboes, English horn, violas
10. All players

== Instrumentation ==
The work is scored for a large orchestra consisting of three flutes (doubling piccolo), three oboes, four clarinets, three bassoons, four horns, three trumpets, three trombones, tuba, percussion, harp, celesta, piano, and strings.
