= The Lordly Hudson =

Poem and 1962 poetry collection by Paul Goodman

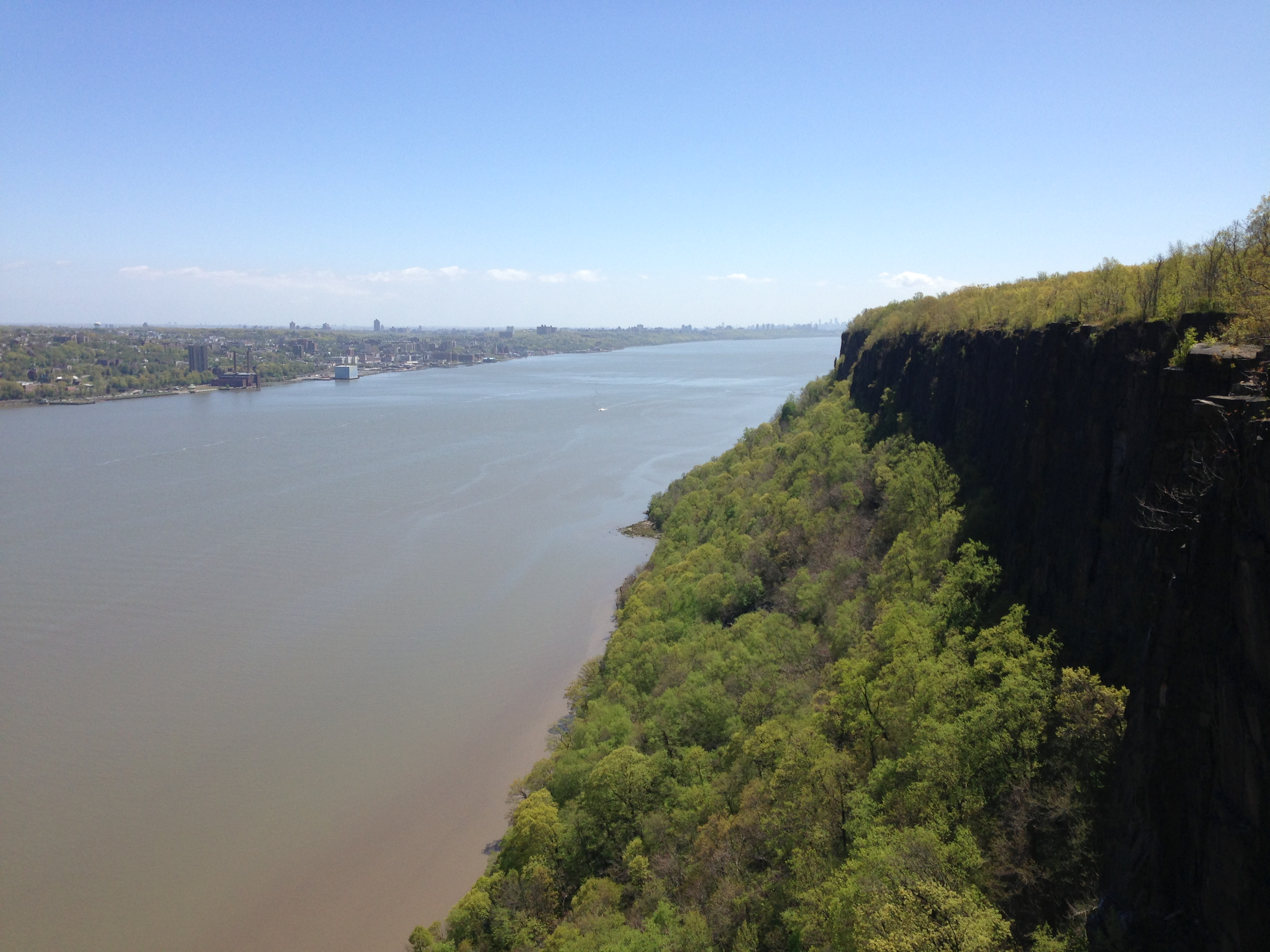
The green-grown cliffs of the Palisades overlooking the Hudson River

The Lordly Hudson is a poem and 1962 book of collected poetry by Paul Goodman.

== Poem ==
External image
- Full poem as originally published in 1941

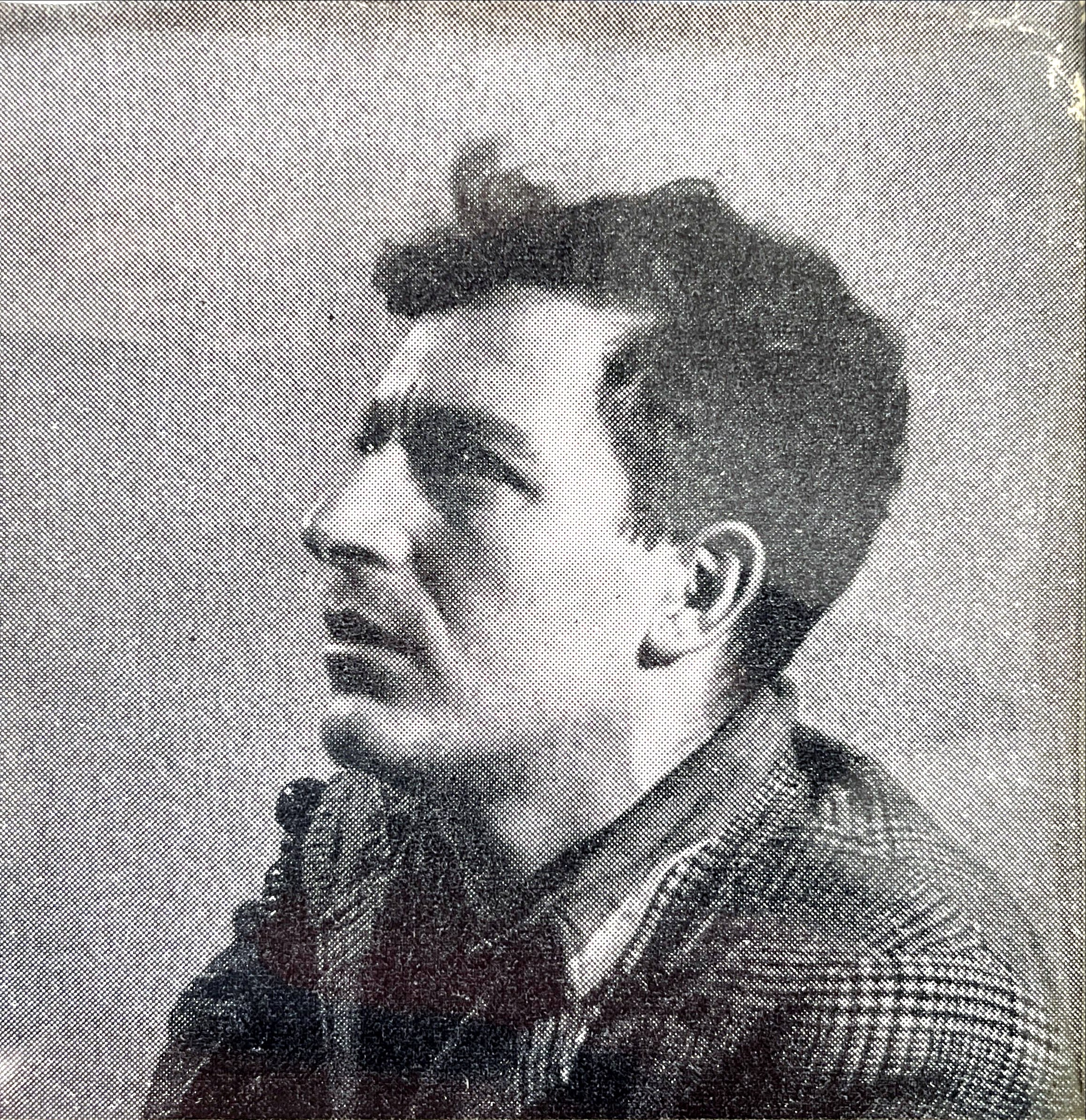
Goodman in the late 1940s

Richard Kostelanetz wrote that Goodman's title lyric was the most memorable line of "The Lordly Hudson":

This is our Lordly Hudson hardly flowing

under the green-grown cliffs

and has no peer in Europe or the East.

Be quiet, heart! Home! Home!

Goodman wrote the poem in February 1937 in reference to his Manhattan homecoming. He was returning by bus during a break from his second semester at the University of Chicago, where he had been unhappy. The text reflects a "passionate pride in home (Manhattan) and a patriotic elation in things familiar". "The Lordly Hudson" was titled "Poem" when published in Five Young American Poets, Second Series (1941). The phrase "lordly Hudson" had been first penned by Washington Irving in the early 1800s.

The repetition within the poem serves to emphasize the extent of the literal river's beauty. Goodman often uses "my" in his poems not as possession but to describe something to which he has given himself. In this case, "our lordly Hudson" is an elevated version of "my" and the lonely joy the speaker wishes to share.

It became Goodman's most famous poem. American essayist Emile Capouya called "The Lordly Hudson" the greatest New York poem since Walt Whitman. The poem, wrote Capouya, represents Goodman's direct, unsophisticated rhetorical style, which pulls from staid virtues like patriotism. Hayden Carruth wrote of its authentic feeling and unrivaled "simple expressiveness". To critic Kingsley Widmer, Goodman's eccentric mannerisms overshadowed its emphasis on the Hudson as a place or experience. Widmer considered "The Lordly Hudson" to represent the inadequacies of Goodman's poetic expression, citing issues like the poem's "Lordly" repetition being awkward, archaic, and stiff. Poet Judson Jerome laughed aloud reading the title lyric for the first time and was surprised to realize that Goodman meant it seriously. What made the poem great, said Gordon Burnside for the St. Louis Post-Dispatch, was Goodman's "patriotic love ... underneath its kidding and fooling".

Goodman continually revised his poems and edited "The Lordly Hudson" in the weeks before his death in 1972 on his return home from teaching in Hawaii. The edited version, with some word and punctuation substitutions, appears in Goodman's posthumous Collected Poems. Hayden Carruth wrote that these substitutions were made hastily and cheapened Goodman's great poem into ordinariness for lessening the effect of the original poem's repetitions, formal expressiveness, and universality. Kingsley Widmer described Goodman's change from "Be quiet, heart!" to the more personal variation, "Be patient, Paul!" as frivolous.

== Song ==
External audio
- Nathan Gunn sings Rorem's "The Lordly Hudson"

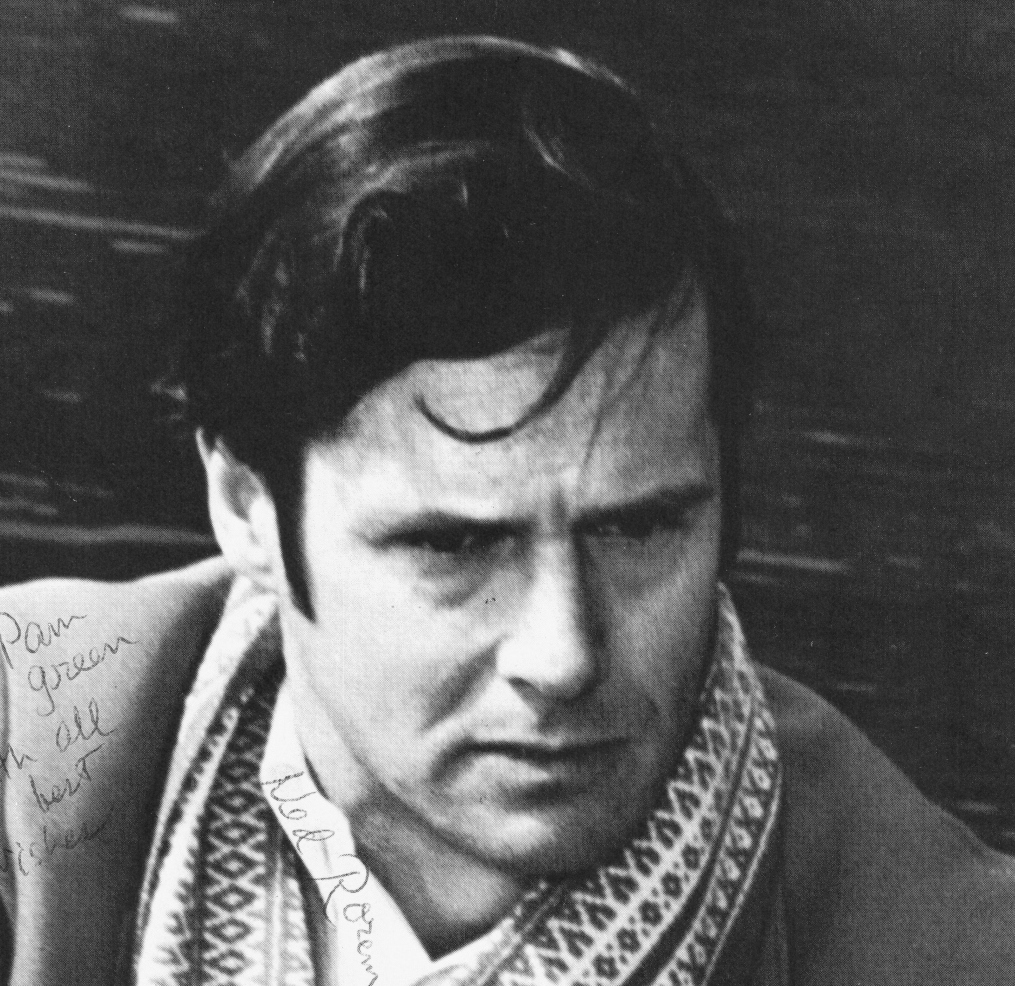
Rorem, the composer, in 1968

Composer Ned Rorem put Goodman's poem "The Lordly Hudson" to art song. Rorem first met Goodman in 1938 at a weekly poetry reading in Chicago, when Rorem was an early teenager. Goodman became Rorem's foremost social and poetic influence, his "Manhattan Goethe". Rorem said he had no background in American art songs before he wrote "The Lordly Hudson". He was inspired to set Goodman's poem to song after hearing Francis Poulenc's "C" setting of Louis Aragon, particularly the vocal interval "de la prairie", at a New York Christmas party in 1946. Though he had struggled to set the poem to music before, Rorem wrote the song in one session the next day, beginning with the "Home! Home!" and "No, no!" parts. The result is lyrical and dramatic, with arching, high emotion intervals and "supple melodic phrases" recalling the Hudson River's grandeur atop a "strong rhythmic chordal accompaniment". A Singer's Guide to the American Art Song described Rorem's composition as matching the urgency and nobility in Goodman's original poem.

Soprano Janet Fairbank, who was known for new American songs, premiered the work without changes. It was known then as "Poem" and later became "Driver, What Stream Is It?" before Goodman titled it "The Lordly Hudson" for the song's publication by Richard Dana. Fairbank died on the day of its publication in 1947. The song was dedicated to her.

The Music Library Association recognized Rorem's "The Lordly Hudson" as the best published song of 1948. It launched his career as his first song, becoming one of his best-known and most-sung. Rorem would continue to set poetry by Goodman to song throughout his career. Vocalists Susan Graham and Nathan Gunn have recorded performances of "The Lordly Hudson". The song became a cultural touchstone of New York City.

== Collection ==
The Lordly Hudson
- Author: Paul Goodman
- Publisher: Macmillan
- Publication date: 1962

The Lordly Hudson: Collected Poems is divided into seven sections: Short Poems, Longer Poems, Stories, Sonnets, Ballades, Love Poems, and Sentences and Prayers. The collection includes Goodman's poetry from 1940 to 1962, written in a traditional structure with less traditional content. The poetry is personal in nature, covering Goodman's aging, independence, love, and sexual potency. The collection features many poetic forms. The Lordly Hudson is Goodman's first poetry collection and his best known poetry book.

The Macmillan Company published The Lordly Hudson: Collected Poems in October 1962, with a paperback to follow three months later. The manuscript is held in the Syracuse University special collections. The collection's namesake poem is printed on its cover. Goodman communicates that his intent is for the collection to embody an attitude rather than writing beautiful poems. Several of the poems have gay themes.

Poet Harvey Shapiro wrote that the poetry in The Lordly Hudson, Goodman's first solo collection, was "the purest version of his thought ... always serviceable, sometimes awkward ... by rips and starts brilliant." Jerome, on the other hand, found the collection mired in "awkwardness, wordiness, and pointless toying" and that Goodman's attitude comes across in themes of "indiscriminate sexuality, ... admiration for power and shock, plainness and simple pleasures, and an ego throbbing like swollen flesh".

Poet Denise Levertov considered Goodman's poems to be on par with his short stories, which she said were among America's greatest. While she considered half of the book's poems to be exceptional, she deemed others exceptionally bad, yet considered Goodman's strength to be the total effect of his voice coming throughout the collection, rather than the quality of individual poems. She found his story poems, however, to be unsuccessful, and his "Red Jacket (Lake Seneca)" to be her favorite.

== Bibliography ==
- Burnside, Gordon (January 27, 1974). "An Honest Crank (Rev. of Collected Poems)". St. Louis Post-Dispatch. St. Louis, Missouri. p. 40.
- Carruth, Hayden (1964). "Intelligence, Rebellion, Interest". Poetry. 104 (1): 44–45. ISSN 0032-2032. JSTOR 20589707.
- — (1996). "Paul Goodman and the Grand Community". Selected Essays and Reviews. Port Townsend, WA: Copper Canyon Press. pp. 231–282. ISBN 978-1-55659-107-5. OCLC 32666113.
- Derleth, August (August 8, 1963). "Books of the Times (Revs. of The Society I Live in Is Mine and The Lordly Hudson)". The Capital Times. Madison, Wisconsin. p. 26.
- — (September–December 1963). "Five Poets at Random (Rev. of The Lordly Hudson)". Voices: A Journal of Poetry. No. 182. pp. 43–46. OCLC 1769269.
- Diggory, Terence (2009). "Goodman, Paul". Encyclopedia of the New York School Poets. Infobase Publishing. pp. 200–202. ISBN 978-1-4381-1905-2.
- Flint, F. Cudworth (1963). "Nineteen on the Slopes of Parnassus". The Virginia Quarterly Review. 39 (4): 677–688. ISSN 0042-675X. JSTOR 26440294.
- Friedberg, Ruth C. (1981). American Art Song and American Poetry. Metuchen, N.J.: Scarecrow Press. ISBN 978-0-8108-1460-8.
- Hennessy, Doyle (January 1964). "Sick Effusions (Rev. of The Lordly Hudson)". Spirit: A Magazine of Poetry. 30: 176–177. ISSN 0038-7584.
- Hoistad, W. K. (April 1963). "Rev. of The Lordly Hudson". Contact: The San Francisco Journal of New Writing, Art and Ideas (14): 71–72. ISSN 0589-5049. OCLC 2916374.
- Jacobsen, Josephine (September 24, 1964). "Books in Review (Rev. of The Lordly Hudson)". The Baltimore Evening Sun. Baltimore, Maryland. p. 18.
- Jerome, Judson (July 6, 1963). "Poetry Quarterly". Saturday Review. Vol. 46, no. 27. pp. 30–32.
- Kostelanetz, Richard (1969). "Paul Goodman: Persistence and Prevalence". Master Minds: Portraits of Contemporary American Artists and Intellectuals. New York: Macmillan. pp. 270–288. OCLC 23458.
- — (1996). "Goodman, Paul. The Lordly Hudson: Collected Poems (1962)". One Million Words of Book Notes, 1958–1993. p. 203. ISBN 978-0-87875-451-9. EBSCOhost 43281932.
- Levertov, Denise (April 13, 1963). "One of the Lucky (Rev. of The Lordly Hudson)". The Nation. 196 (15): 310–311. ISSN 0027-8378. EBSCOhost 13210856.
- Myers, Neil (1964). "Recent Poetry (Rev. of The Lordly Hudson)". The Minnesota Review. 4 (3): 465–466. ISSN 0026-5667.
- Nicely, Tom (1979). Adam and His Work: A Bibliography of Sources by and about Paul Goodman (1911–1972). Metuchen, N.J.: Scarecrow Press. ISBN 978-0-8108-1219-2. OCLC 4832535.
- Ostriker, Alicia (1986). "Poet of Indecorum". In Parisi, Peter (ed.). Artist of the Actual: Essays on Paul Goodman. Metuchen, N.J.: Scarecrow Press. pp. 80–89. ISBN 978-0-8108-1843-9. OCLC 12418868. Previously published as "Paul Goodman". Partisan Review. Vol. 43, no. 2. 1976. pp. 286–295. ISSN 0031-2525.
- Rich, Adrienne (February 1963). "Poetry". New York Review of Books. Vol. 1, no. 1. p. 27. ISSN 0028-7504.
- Shapiro, Harvey (September 1, 1963). "To Be Oneself, to Be Sane, to Insist". The New York Times Book Review. p. 3. ISSN 0362-4331.
- Stoehr, Taylor (1978). Introduction. A Ceremonial: Stories 1936–1940. By Goodman, Paul. Stoehr, Taylor (ed.). Collected Stories. Vol. 2. Santa Barbara: Black Sparrow Press. pp. 7–16. ISBN 978-0-87685-354-2.
- Villamil, Victoria Etnier (2004). "Ned Rorem". A Singer's Guide to the American Art Song: 1870–1980. Scarecrow Press. pp. 314–333. ISBN 978-1-4616-5599-2.
- — (1980). Paul Goodman. Boston: Twayne. ISBN 0-8057-7292-8.
