= Symphony No. 3 (Rorem) =

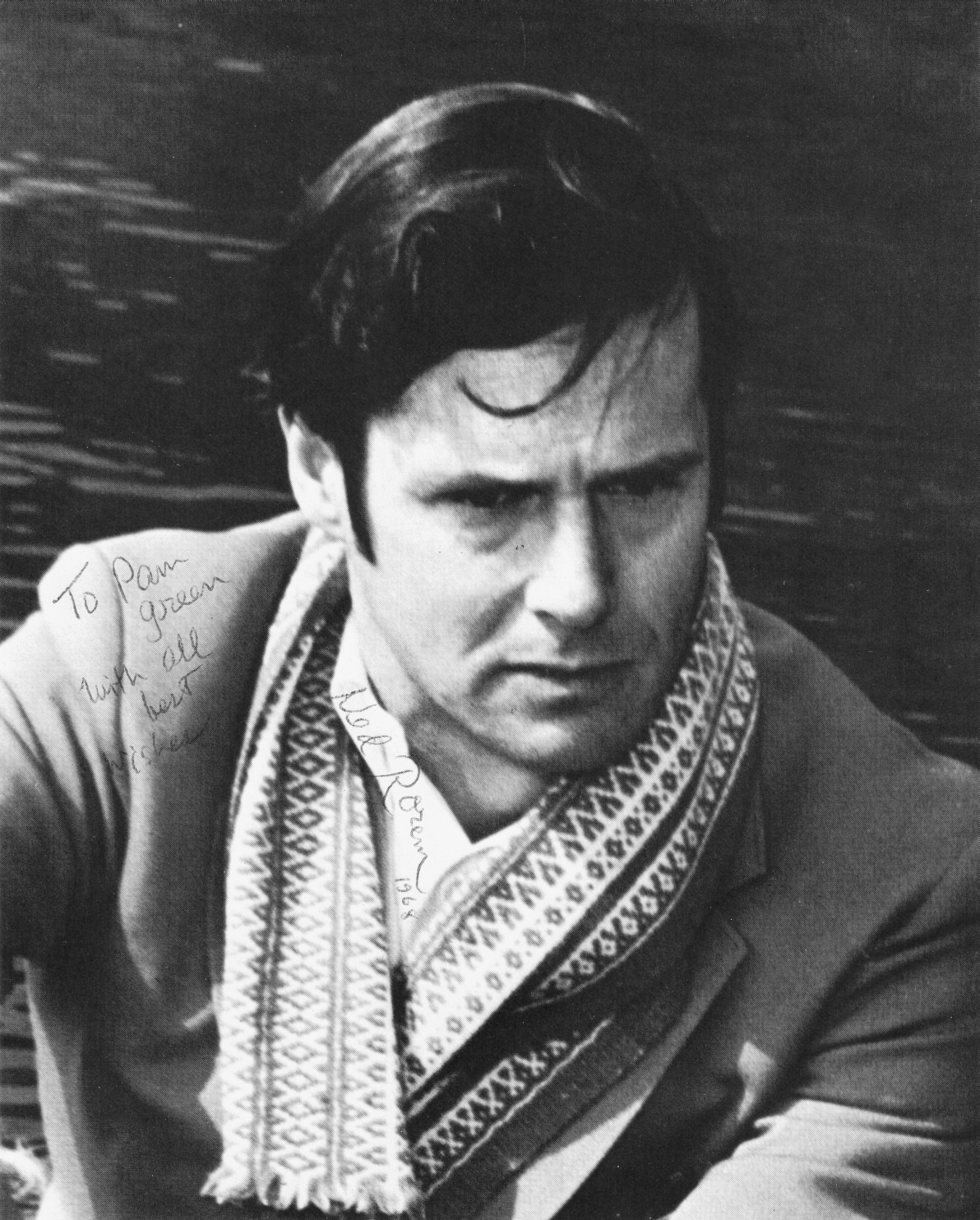
Ned Rorem in 1968

The Symphony No. 3 is a composition for orchestra by the American composer Ned Rorem. The work was first performed by the New York Philharmonic under the direction of Leonard Bernstein at Carnegie Hall on April 16, 1959.

== Composition ==
=== Structure ===
The Symphony No. 3 has a duration of roughly 24 minutes and is cast in five movements:

1. Passacaglia
2. Allegro molto vivace
3. Largo
4. Andante
5. Allegro molto

The movements were not composed in chronological order; Rorem wrote the "Allegro molto vivace" first, the "Pasacaglia" second, the "Andante" third, the "Largo" fourth, and the "Allegro molto" last. Rorem called the first movement "a slow overture in the grand style." The second movement, which the composer described as "a brisk and jazzy dance," had originally been composed as a piece for two pianos eight years prior. Rorem described the third movements as "a short, passionate page about somnambulism, full of dynamic contrast, and coming from afar." He called the fourth movement "a farewell to France" and described the fifth and final movement as a miniature Concerto for Orchestra.

=== Instrumentation ===
The work is scored for a large orchestra consisting of two flutes, piccolo, two oboes, cor anglais, two clarinets, bass clarinet, two bassoon, contrabassoon, four horns, three trumpets, three trombones, tuba, timpani, percussion, harp, celesta, piano, and strings.

== Reception ==
Though rarely performed, the symphony has received praise from music critics. Andrew Farach-Colton of Gramophone praised the symphony, writing, "The first movement passacaglia is simply gorgeous – listen beginning at 3'15" to hear how much Rorem gleaned from Ravel – and the two adjacent slow movements are also exquisitely coloured. I find the manic, Bernstein-esque scherzo uncharacteristically coarse, though the finale more than makes up for it, providing exhilaration and plenty of orchestral razzle-dazzle without a trace of raucousness."

Reviewing a 2000 performance at the Curtis Institute of Music, Allan Kozinn of The New York Times similarly observed, "It is in some ways very much of its time, in that it embodies an updated form of Impressionism, filtered through an American urbanity, as well as stretches of jazzy theatricality in the style of Bernstein (who conducted this work's premiere) and even a trace of Copland's faux-Western accent." He added, "It may also have been a manifesto of sorts, an assertive declaration that tonality and conventional structures still had something to say at a time when Serialism was ascendant. The work has not been heard very frequently, but today its tonal, eclectic personality is current again: tonality is now acceptable everywhere, and composers 40 years younger than Mr. Rorem (who is a young-looking 76) write music that makes similar allusions." Kozinn also called it "a demanding work" and wrote, "Its dense, outgoing sections require power and assurance, and its more graceful slow movements require delicacy and a fine balance."
