= Flute Concerto (Rorem) =

2002 Concerto by Ned Rorem

The Flute Concerto is a composition for solo flute and orchestra by the American composer Ned Rorem. The work was commissioned by the Philadelphia Orchestra and was composed between August 2001 and May 2002. Its world premiere was given by the flutist Jeffrey Khaner and the Philadelphia Orchestra conducted by Roberto Abbado at the Kimmel Center for the Performing Arts on December 4, 2003.

== Composition ==
=== Structure ===
The piece has a duration of roughly 25 minutes and is cast in six movements:

1. The Stone Tower
2. Leaving – Traveling – Hoping
3. Sirens
4. Hymn
5. False Waltz
6. Résumé and Prayer

Rorem commented on the movement titles in the score program notes, writing, "I don't believe that non-vocal music can be proved to "mean" anything precise, like Love or Death or Fright, much less Yellow or Tuesday or Lake. But sometimes it's helpful and fun to ascribe (usually after the fact) names to separate movements." He continued:

Thus the six subtitles are 1. "The Stone Tower," a studio at Yaddo where the music was written; 2. "Leaving–Traveling–Hoping," made up of two short tunes surrounding a long poem; 3. "Sirens," an ambling succession of melodies and ripples; 4. "Hymn," an interlude for just five instruments; 5. "False Waltz," a rollicking affair shaped like a pyramid (soft to loud to soft); 6. "Résumé and Prayer" is just that: a cadenza reviving briefly all the foregoing matter, and closing on a very quiet note.

=== Instrumentation ===
The work is scored for a solo flute and an orchestra comprising two additional flutes, two oboes, two clarinets, two bassoons, two horns, two trumpets, timpani, piano, harp, and strings.

== Reception ==
Reviewing a recording of the piece paired with Rorem's Violin Concerto and Pilgrims, Peter Dickinson of Gramophone wrote, "This is relaxed and indulgent music, even if these works are not the best from this now grand old man of American music." John von Rhein of the Chicago Tribune similarly described it as an "inventively quirky mosaic of instrumental songs without words."
