= Our Town (opera) =

Operatic adaptation of the classic American play by Thornton Wilder

- Opera by Ned Rorem
- Librettist: J. D. McClatchy
- Language: English
- Based on: Our Town by Thornton Wilder
- Premiere: 25 February 2006; Musical Arts Center, Indiana University

Our Town is a three-act opera by composer Ned Rorem and librettist J. D. McClatchy. It is the first opera to be adapted from Thornton Wilder's 1938 play of the same name. The opera was commissioned by Indiana University Jacobs School of Music, Opera Boston, the Aspen Music Festival and School, North Carolina School of the Arts, Lake George Opera in Saratoga Springs, N.Y., and Festival Opera in Walnut Creek, Calif.

== Roles ==
The following principal roles appear as listed in the score published by Boosey & Hawkes:

- Stage Manager: Tenor
- Emily Webb, daughter of Mr. and Mrs. Webb: Soprano
- George Gibbs, son of Mr. and Mrs. Gibbs: Tenor
- Dr. Gibbs, the town doctor: Bass
- Mrs. Gibbs: Mezzo-Soprano
- Mr. Webb, the newspaper editor: Baritone
- Mrs. Webb: Mezzo-Soprano
- Mrs. Soames: Mezzo-Soprano
- Simon Stimson, the choirmaster: Tenor
- Joe Crowell, Frank, & Sam, friends of George: Tenor

== Performance history ==
It was premiered by Indiana University Opera Theater with student singers and orchestra on 25 February 2006. Its professional debut was at the Lake George Opera on 1 July 2006. It covers the same ground as the play, dealing with birth, maturity and death. Rorem created pleasant melodies and sparseness to maintain the feel of the original production. The opera is virtually sung through, with little spoken dialogue. As with the play, the libretto calls for no sets, a bare stage, and limited props.

The British and European première took place in the Silk Street Theatre at the Guildhall School of Music & Drama on 29 May 2012, directed by Stephen Medcalf and conducted by Clive Timms.

Opening night cast: (Main roles: Played by)

- Stage Manager: Stuart Laing
- Emily Webb: Sky Ingram
- George Gibbs: Alexandros Tsilogiannis
- Mrs Gibbs: Kathryn McAdam
- Dr. Gibbs: Barnaby Rae
- Mr Webb: Ashley Riches
- Mrs Webb: Emily Blanch
- Simon Stimson: Jorge Navarro-Colorado
- Mrs Soames: Anna Starushkevych

The opera was performed at the Glenn Korff School of Music at the University of Nebraska–Lincoln November 12–15, 2009. The Ohio première took place on 12 February 2010 at the Baldwin-Wallace Conservatory of Music in Berea, Ohio. The Drake University Department of Music presented the Iowa première in Drake's Sheslow Auditorium April 26 & 27, 2013. It was performed at Central City Opera in Colorado during the summer 2013 season and at the Bass School of Music at Oklahoma City University February 21–23, 2014. Boston Opera Collaborative presented the opera in June 2015, and a rare performance was heard at the Eastman School of Music in April 2015 and at Opera Nuova in Edmonton in June 2015. The opera was performed at the Gallo Center for the Arts in Modesto, California, by the Townsend Opera January 21 & 22, 2017, and again at the Veterans Memorial Auditorium in Fresno, California by the Fresno Grand Opera on January 28 and 29, 2017. These two productions were essentially the same though with local choruses and orchestras. Alison Moritz was Stage Director and Ryan Murray Music Director for both productions. The University of Missouri presented the opera in March 2017 at the Missouri Theater Center for the Arts. Christine Seitz directed the production. From February 7 to February 10, 2019 Southern Methodist University's Meadows School of the Arts will perform the opera in the Bob Hope Theater at the Owen Arts Center. Georgia State University Opera Theatre performed the opera on April 15 and 16, 2023 at the Rialto Theatre in Atlanta directed by Dr. JJ Hudson. Utah Festival Opera performed the opera in the Eccles Theatre in Logan, Utah during their 2023 summer season.
