= Bertha (opera) =

Opera by Ned Rorem

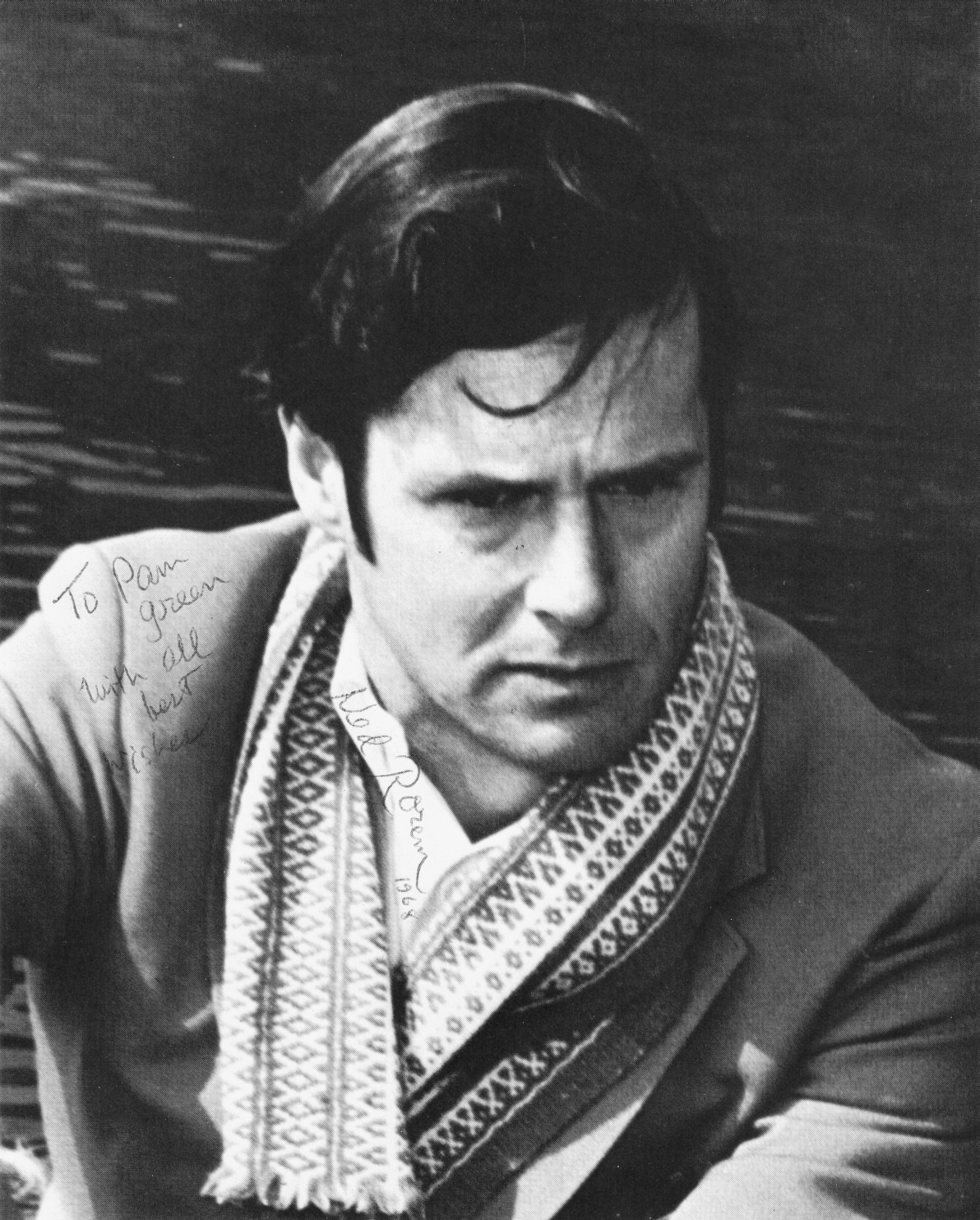
Ned Rorem in 1968

Bertha is an opera in one act, with music by Ned Rorem to an English libretto by Kenneth Koch, an original work parodying Shakespeare's histories. Rorem wrote the work originally at the request of the Metropolitan Opera (Met) Studio in the 1960s, intended as an opera for children. However, the Met studio rejected the work. The work was premiered at Alice Tully Hall in New York City on November 25, 1973 with Beverly Wolff in the title role.

Bertha is still sporadically performed. It received a performance by The Golden Fleece in New York City in 1981. In the UK, the New World Opera Company produced the work in London in February 2001.

== Roles ==
- Bertha, queen of Norway (mezzo-soprano)
- Noble
- Teacher
- Scotchman
- Man
- Barbarian Chieftain
- Counsellor
- Third Scotchman
- Officer
- Second Scotchman
- Norwegian Citizen
- Common Norwegian
- Old Man
- Second Norwegian Citizen
- Messenger
- Girl

== Synopsis ==
The setting is the royal residence in Oslo, Norway, in the medieval era.

The garrison of the slightly deranged Queen Bertha of Oslo is encased by barbarians. She leads an attack, in a ring of white eagles, and the attackers are repelled. A teacher questions her as to whether her own subjects are barbarians, for which Bertha orders the teacher executed.

After the country is at peace, Bertha then declares war on Scotland. The Counselor objects to these endless wars, and Bertha dismisses the council. Two young lovers meet in Bertha's garden, but they are shot dead there, as the queen disapproves of lovers' trysts.

As Bertha ages, her madness increases and she keeps wanting new adventures. Bertha gives Norway to the barbarians so that she can reconquer the nation. She does this, but collapses dead on her regained throne. The people praise her as a great queen.
