= Violin Concerto (Rorem) =

The Violin Concerto is a composition for solo violin and chamber orchestra by the American composer Ned Rorem. The work was commissioned by the Springfield Symphony Orchestra for the violinist Jaime Laredo and composed in 1984. It was first performed by Laredo and the Springfield Symphony Orchestra conducted by Robert Gutter in the Symphony Hall, Springfield, on March 30, 1985.

== Composition ==
=== Structure ===
The concerto has a duration of approximately 22 minutes and is cast in six movements:

1. Twilight
2. Toccata – Chaconne
3. Romance Without Words
4. Midnight
5. Toccata – Rondo
6. Dawn

=== Instrumentation ===
The work is scored for solo violin and a chamber orchestra consisting of flute (doubling piccolo), oboe, two clarinets, bassoon, trumpet, timpani, and strings.

== Reception ==
The music critic Donal Henahan of The New York Times gave the piece moderate praise, remarking that "the work proved to be immediately digestible and pleasant enough of its genial type." He added, "In its best moments, it vaguely reminded one of Sibelius or Barber. Mr. Rorem's score makes a few brusquely dramatic gestures (timpani obbligatos, for instance, in movements entitled Toccata-Chaconne and Toccata-Rondo), but in the main it relies on the kind of anonymous, vaporous lyricism that characterizes so much of his instrumental work." Reviewing a recording of the piece paired with Rorem's Flute Concerto and Pilgrims, Peter Dickinson of Gramophone wrote, "This is relaxed and indulgent music, even if these works are not the best from this now grand old man of American music."
