= Miss Julie (Rorem opera) =

- Opera by William Alwyn
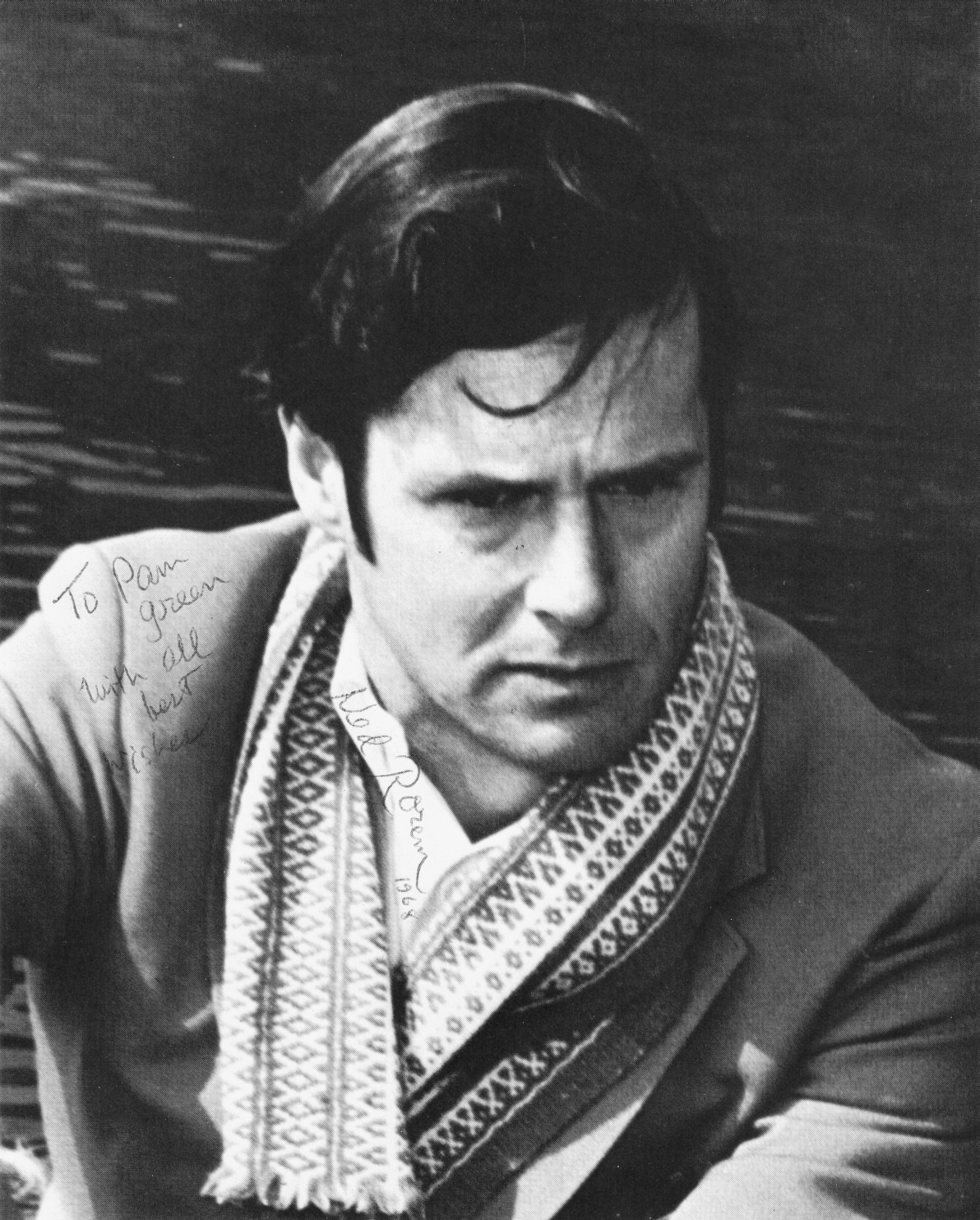
- Rorem in 1968
- Librettist: Kenward Elmslie
- Language: English
- Based on: August Strindberg's Miss Julie
- Premiere: 4 November 1965; New York City Opera

Miss Julie is an opera by Ned Rorem to an English libretto by Kenward Elmslie, based on the play, Miss Julie (1888), by Swedish playwright August Strindberg. It explores the subject of the intersection of social class and illicit sexual relations in late 19th-century Sweden.

== Performance history ==
The opera was commissioned by the New York City Opera, and had its first performance there on 4 November 1965, in its original two-hour, two-act version. The production was conducted by Robert Zeller and directed by Nikos Psacharopoulos, with scenic and lighting design by Will Steven Armstrong, costume design by Patton Campbell, and choreography by Thomas Andrew. The opera was not a critical success.

Rorem revised the score and shortened it to a single act in 1978; this version lasts 90 minutes and was first performed that same year by the New York Lyric Opera. The one-act version underwent further slight revisions and was produced again in 1994 by the Manhattan School of Music Opera Theatre. This version was praised by James Oestreich, music critic of The New York Times, as "taut and persuasive musical drama". It was recorded and released on the Newport Classic label. Another recording, of a production on 7 November 2003 by the Curtis Opera Theatre, has been released on Albany Records.

== Roles ==
Role	Voice type	Premiere Cast, 4 November 1965 (Conductor: Robert Zeller)
Miss Julie, 25, daughter of the Count	soprano	Marguerite Willauer
John, 30, the valet	bass-baritone	Donald Gramm
Christine, 28, the cook	mezzo-soprano	Elaine Bonazzi
Niels, 38, Miss Julie's fiancé	tenor	Richard Krause
Wildcat boy	soprano (or boy soprano)	Betsy Hepburn
Stableboy	bass	Don Yule
Young couple	soprano tenor	Joan Summers; Nico Castel
Chorus: revellers, servants, and farmhands

== Instrumentation ==
The orchestra consists of: 2 flutes, 2 oboes, 2 clarinets, 2 bassoons, 3 horns, 2 trumpets, 2 trombones, timpani, 2 additional percussion players (xylophone, slapstick, gong, triangle, vibraphone, tambourine, cymbals, tenor drum, glockenspiel, castanets, chimes, suspended cymbal, bongos), guitar, harp, strings.

== Synopsis ==
Place: the servants' quarters of a country estate in Sweden.
Time: a Midsummer Eve celebration in the 1880s.

Miss Julie, the jaded daughter of the Count, orders her fiancé Niels to kiss her boot. He breaks off their engagement in disgust. Later that evening John, the valet, and his fiancée Christine, the cook, sit with Miss Julie. She flirts with John, who eventually admits he has loved her since boyhood. On the following day John and Miss Julie discuss how they will spend their lives together, and John expresses his desire to go to Lake Como to make his living running a hotel. When Miss Julie admits she has no money of her own to finance such an undertaking, John demands she somehow find some, so Miss Julie steals money from the Count. Meanwhile, Christine discovers John's intentions and threatens to quit her job with the Count. The lovers prepare to escape, but Miss Julie demands to take her canary with her. Angered, John kills the bird. She grabs his razor and threatens to slit her wrists, and he suggests she go ahead and do it. The Count rings for John, and he leaves, as Julie goes slowly into the garden and follows his suggestion.
