= Judson Jerome =

American poet

Jerome, giving a lecture at Antioch College

Judson Jerome (February 8, 1927 in Tulsa, Oklahoma – August 5, 1991 in Xenia, Ohio) was an American poet, author, and literary critic, perhaps best known for having written the poetry column for Writer's Digest for over thirty years, beginning in 1959. He also taught poetry at Antioch College, where his students included Gregory Orr and Mark Strand.

== Hemingway emendation ==
Jerome is involved in the scholarly conversation surrounding a controversial amendment to Ernest Hemingway's 1933 short story A Clean, Well-Lighted Place: in 1956, Jerome — then an assistant professor of English at Antioch College — wrote to Hemingway to inquire about a section of dialogue which he saw as problematic. Hemingway responded to Jerome with the thirteen words "I just read the story and it continues to make sense to me."; however, when A Clean, Well-Lighted Place was republished posthumously in Scribner's Magazine in 1965 and in all future editions, the passage in question had been changed to address the concern Jerome and other scholars had raised. Whether Scribner's was correct in making the emendation remains a subject of debate among Hemingway scholars, with the note to Jerome serving as evidence against the emendation.
