= Piano Concerto No. 4 (Rorem) =

The Piano Concerto No. 4 for Left Hand and Orchestra is the fourth piano concerto by the American composer Ned Rorem. It was commissioned by the Curtis Institute of Music for the pianist Gary Graffman. The work was first performed by Graffman and the Curtis Institute of Music Orchestra conducted by André Previn at the Academy of Music, Philadelphia, on February 4, 1993. Its New York City premiere was performed the next day by the same ensemble at Carnegie Hall. A then-unknown Hilary Hahn performed a solo violin section for both performances.

== Composition ==
=== Background ===
The composer Ned Rorem and the pianist Gary Graffman first became acquainted as students at the Curtis Institute of Music. They were five years apart in age at the time and only later became close friends due to their mutual pianist friends Eugene Istomin and Julius Katchen. They remained friends for many decades since—which was furthered by Graffman's 1986 appointment as director of the Curtis Institute of Music, where Rorem had been on faculty for six years. Graffman, who had an ailment preventing the use of two fingers in his right hand, thus came to Rorem when the Institute decided to commission a new left-handed piano concerto. Before the premiere, Graffman commented, "I knew he would be just the right person to do this, and he did a terrific piece in eight movements. But when I saw it, I decided that it is really a piece for eight fingers, not five, because it is so difficult and jumps all over the place."

=== Structure ===
The concerto has a duration of approximately 25 minutes and is cast in three numbered movements divided into eight subsections:

Movement I.

1. Opening Passacaglia
2. Tarantella
3. Conversation

Movement II.

4. Hymn
5. Duet
6. Vignette

Movement III.

7. Medley
8. Closing Passacaglia

=== Instrumentation ===
The work is scored for a solo pianist (left hand only) and an orchestra comprising two flutes (2nd doubling piccolo), two oboes, two clarinets, two bassoons, two horns, two trumpets, two trombones, timpani, three percussionists, celesta, harp, and strings.

== Reception ==
The concerto has been praised by music critics. A year after the world premiere, James R. Oestreich of The New York Times said the work "seems to grow in stature with each hearing." John von Rhein of the Chicago Tribune wrote, "The composer calls it an 'entertainment shaped like a suite,' an apt description for his unusual eight-movement design, which falls into the traditional fast-slow-fast pattern with a delicately lyrical section surrounded by sections of brilliant, spiky caprice." He added, "This is inventive, accessible, cleverly scored, 'profoundly tonal' music (to use Rorem's words)."

== Recording ==
The February 4, 1993 Carnegie Hall performance was commercially recorded and released by New World Records on March 14, 1994. The album also featured a recording of Rorem's Eleven Studies for Eleven Players.

== See also ==
- List of works for piano left-hand and orchestra
