= Mallet Concerto =

Percussion concerto by Ned Rorem

The Mallet Concerto is a concerto for mallet percussion instruments and chamber orchestra by the American composer Ned Rorem. It was first performed by the percussionist Evelyn Glennie and the Madison Symphony Orchestra under the conductor John DeMain in Madison, Wisconsin, on March 27, 2004.

== Composition ==
=== Background ===
The concerto was completed in 2003. Typical of Rorem's late-period orchestral works, the piece calls for no unpitched percussion instruments, which was stipulated by the composer before he agreed to write the concerto for Evelyn Glennie. Rorem elaborated on this point in the score program notes, remarking, "After years of garnishing my orchestral works with every type of gong and drum, I've concluded that non-pitched percussion is superfluous, even in Beethoven. I am morally against all cymbal crashes, and feel that snares and bongos are strictly ornamental." He added, "The four elements of music are melody, harmony, counterpoint, and rhythm. Rhythm is the most dispensable." The concerto has a duration of roughly 24 minutes and is cast in seven movements.

=== Instrumentation ===
The work is scored for a solo percussionist and a chamber orchestra comprising flute, oboe, clarinets, horn, trumpet, trombone, and strings. The soloist's percussion battery consists of vibraphone, marimba, glockenspiel, and xylophone.

== Reception ==
The piece has been praised by music critics. Jeremy Eichler of The New York Times wrote, "Each [instrument] has strikingly different sonorities and Mr. Rorem created seven brief and handsome movements, including a deftly skittering scherzo and a vaguely menacing waltz. The work showcased a wide array of timbral and thematic relationships between the soloist and the orchestra, pared down with lean string writing and tart woodwinds." The concerto was also praised by Brett Campbell of The Wall Street Journal, who called it "by turns wistful and playful."
