= Ned Rorem =

American composer and writer (1923–2022)

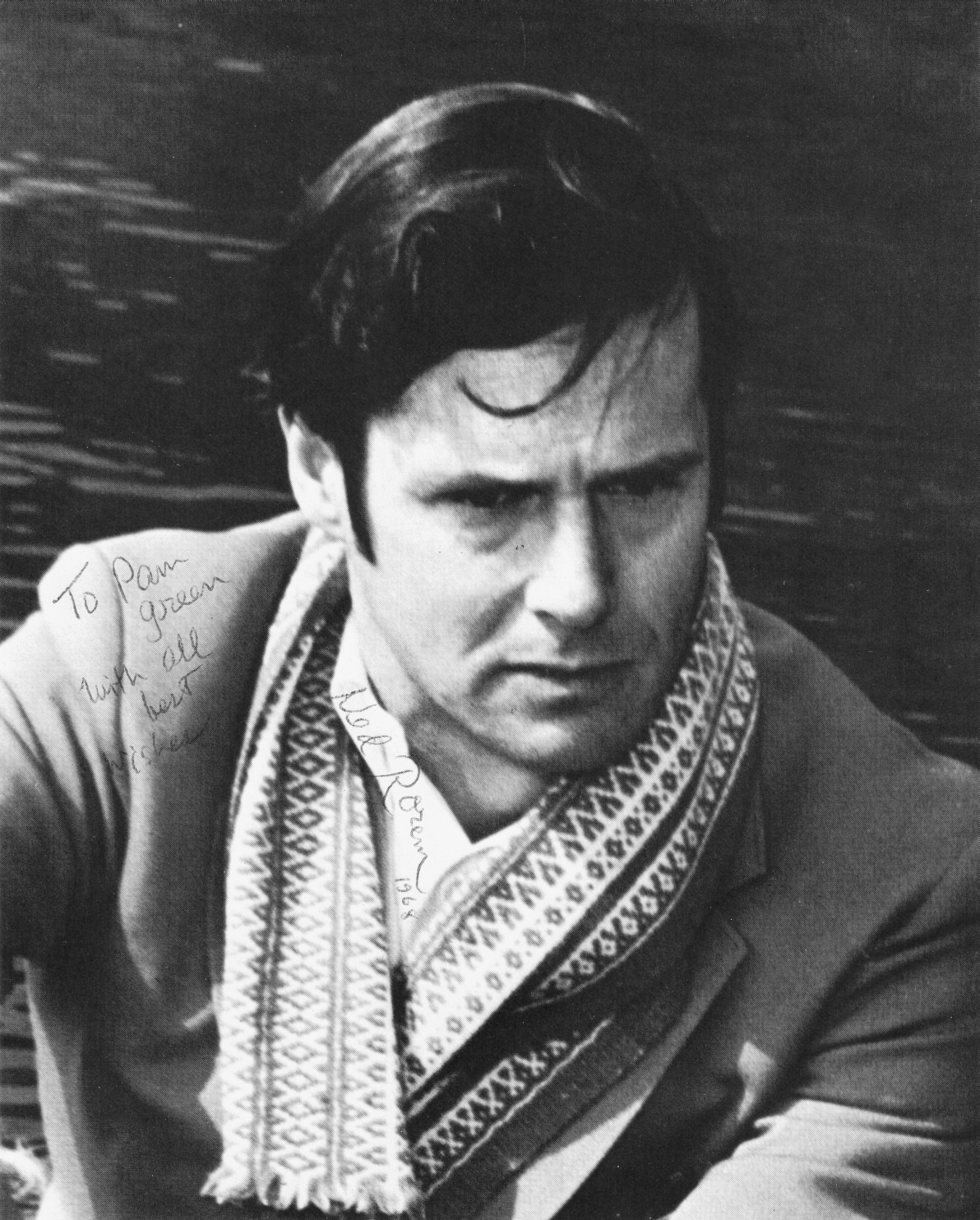
- Rorem in 1968
- Born: Ned Miller Rorem; October 23, 1923; Richmond, Indiana, U.S.
- Died: November 18, 2022 (aged 99); New York City, New York, U.S.
- Education: Northwestern University; Curtis Institute; Juilliard School (BA, MM)
- Occupations: Composer; writer
- Works: List of compositions
- Website: Official website

Ned Miller Rorem (October 23, 1923 – November 18, 2022) was an American composer of contemporary classical music and a writer. Best known for his art songs, which number over 500, Rorem was considered the leading American of his time writing in the genre. Frequently described as a neoromantic composer, he showed limited interest in the emerging modernist aesthetic of his lifetime. As a writer, he kept—and later published—numerous diaries in which he spoke candidly of his exchanges and relationships with many cultural figures of America and France.

Born in Richmond, Indiana, Rorem found an early interest in music, studying with Margaret Bonds and Leo Sowerby. He developed a strong enthusiasm for French music and received mentorship from Aaron Copland and Virgil Thomson, among others. After two productive years in Morocco, Rorem was hosted by the arts patron Marie-Laure de Noailles in Paris, where he was influenced by the neoclassicist group Les Six, particularly Francis Poulenc and Darius Milhaud. He returned to America in around 1957, establishing himself as a prominent composer and receiving regular commissions. For the American Bicentennial, he worked on seven different commissions concurrently, among which was Air Music: Ten Etudes for Orchestra, which won a Pulitzer Prize for Music in 1976.

Much of Rorem's life was spent with his lifelong partner James Holmes, between his apartment in New York and house in Nantucket. From 1980 onwards he taught at the Curtis Institute. He wrote the large-scale song cycle Evidence of Things Not Seen (1997) to 36 texts by 24 writers, for the New York Festival of Song. It is considered by commentators and Rorem himself to be his magnum opus. Much of his later compositions were devoted to concertante and his final major work was the opera Our Town (2006).

== Life and career ==
=== 1923–1940: Childhood and youth ===
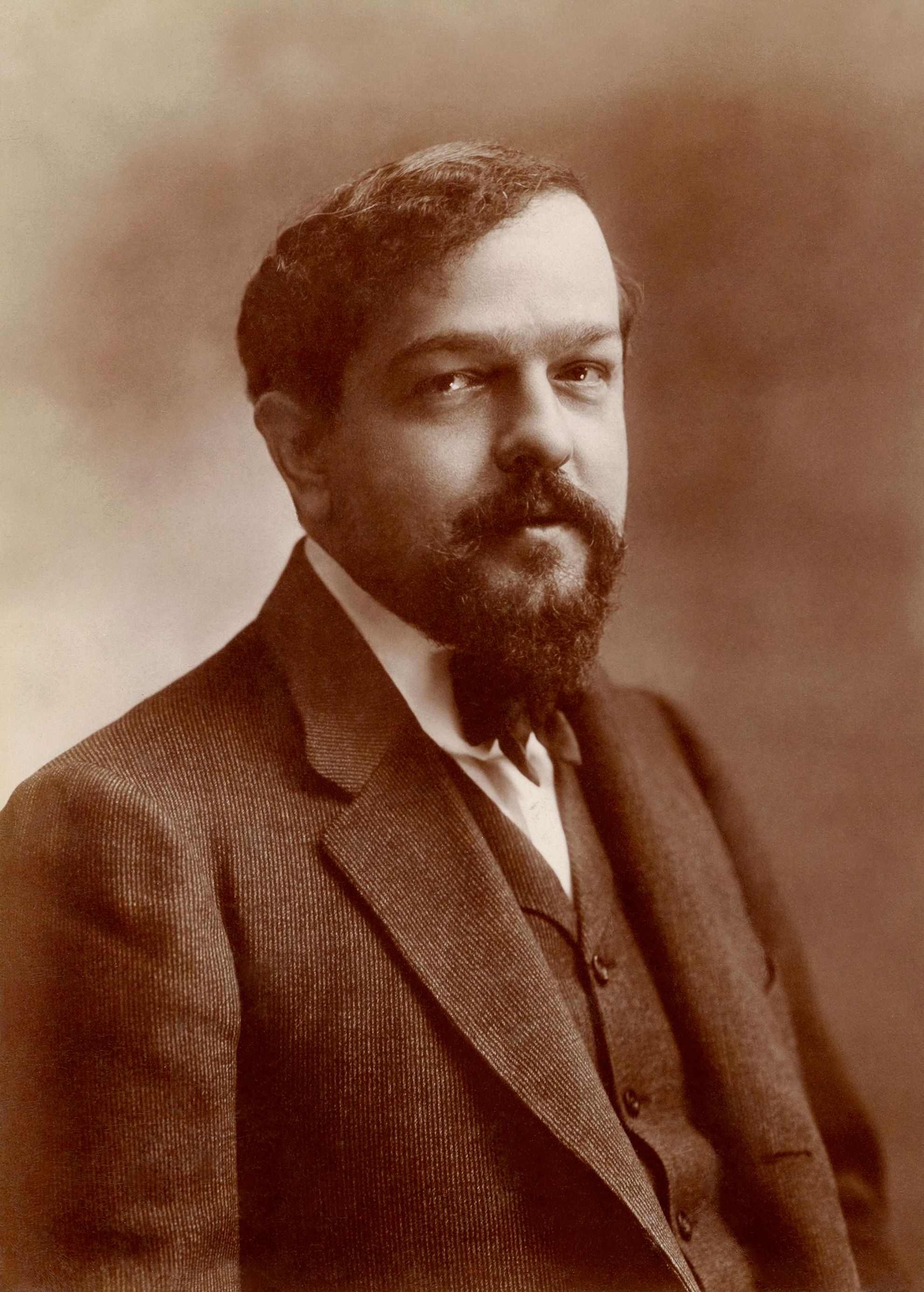
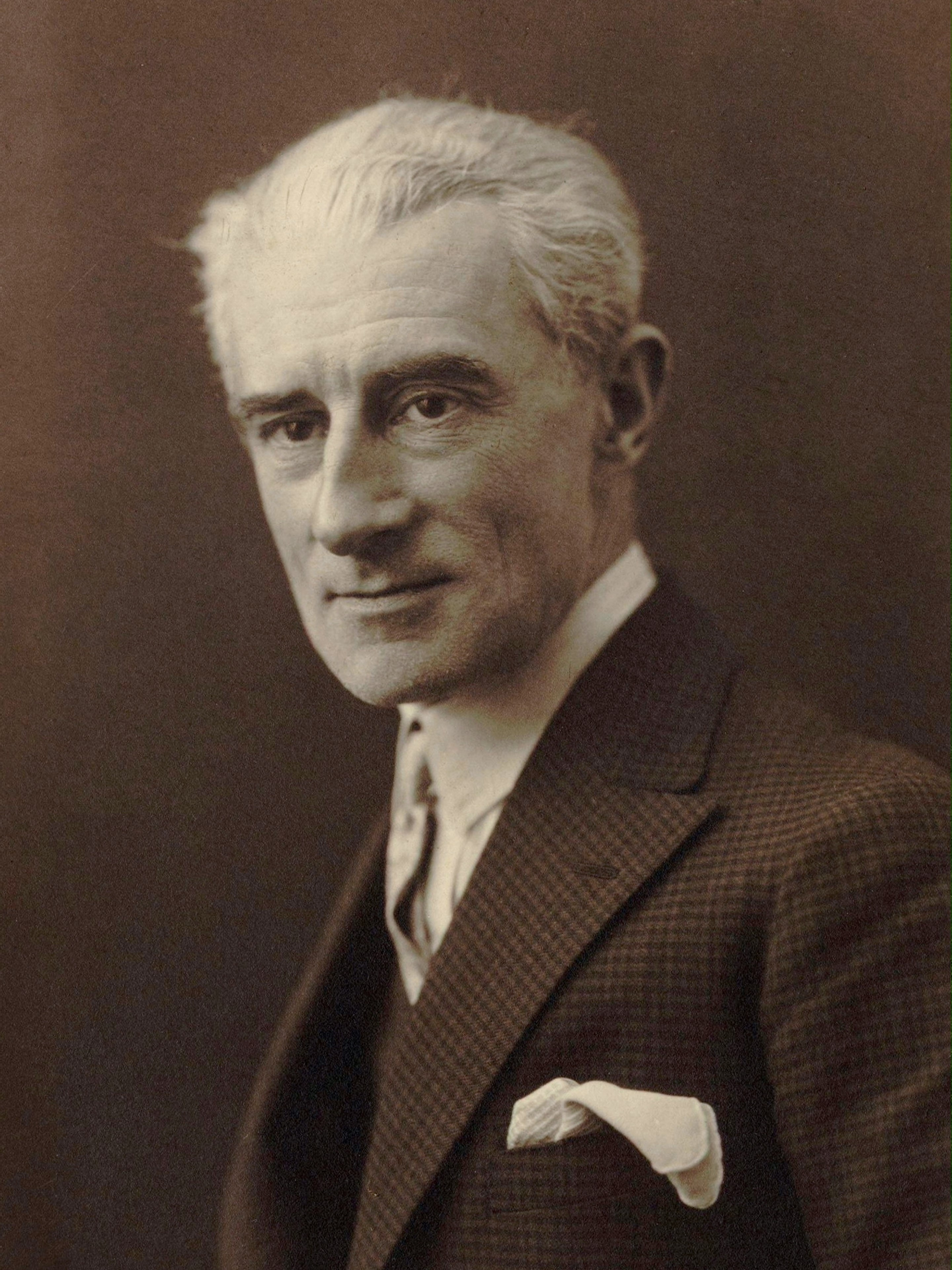
Rorem maintained a life-long interest in the French Impressionist composers Claude Debussy (left) and Maurice Ravel (right)

Ned Miller Rorem was born in Richmond, Indiana, US on October 23, 1923. Born to parents of Norwegian descent, he was their second child after his sister Rosemary. (Note: The family name, Rorem, is an anglicized version of the Norwegian surname Rorhjem.) His father Clarence Rufus Rorem was a medical economist at Earlham College whose work later inspired the Blue Cross Blue Shield Association, while his mother Gladys Miller Rorem was active in antiwar movements and the Religious Society of Friends (Quakers). Ned described his background as "upper middle-class, semi-bohemian but with a strong Quaker emphasis". He later explained that his family was more culturally but not religiously Quaker; (Note: Rorem 1967, p. 133: "We were Quakers of the intellectual rather than the puritanical variety") throughout his life he described himself as a "Quaker atheist". The family moved to Chicago a few months after Rorem's birth, where he attended the University of Chicago Laboratory Schools. Though not musicians themselves, his parents were enthusiastic about the arts, and brought their children to numerous concerts by the famous pianists and dancers. (Note: McDonald (1989, p. 3) names piano recitals by Josef Hofmann, Ignacy Jan Paderewski and Sergei Rachmaninoff, as well as the dance performances by Ruth Page, Mary Wigman and the Ballets Russes as among those young Rorem attended)

Rorem showed an early talent and interest in music, learning piano in his youth with Nuta Rothschild. Though he had other teachers before Rothschild, she was his first to make a lasting impression: she inaugurated his life-long enthusiasm for French music and culture, especially Impressionists such as Claude Debussy and Maurice Ravel. (Note: Although Ewen (1982, p. 540) claims it was his second teacher, Margaret Bonds, who first introduced him to French Impressionist music, this contradicts both McDonald (1989, p. 3) and Rorem's own account: "for it was an awakening sound which immediately, as we Quakers say, spoke to my condition, a condition nurtured by Mrs. Rothschild, who began to immerse me in impressionism". He expands on this further in Rorem (1983, p. 9), quoted in McDonald (1989, p. 3)) By age 12, Rorem began piano lessons with Margaret Bonds, who helped foster his interest in music composition and introduced him to both American jazz and American classical music by composers such as Charles Tomlinson Griffes and John Alden Carpenter. The music of Igor Stravinsky and songs of Billie Holiday also left deep impressions. (Note: Rorem later remarked that "A singer like Billie Holiday has been more influential on my way of writing a song than any so-called classical singer".) He began piano study with Belle Tannenbaum in 1938, under whom he learned and performed the first movement of Edvard Grieg's Piano Concerto. Throughout his youth he also studied music theory at the American Conservatory of Music with Leo Sowerby, a well known church music composer of the time. He graduated high school in 1940, around when he began a close friendship with the future writer Paul Goodman, whose poems he would later set to music. Rorem also found interest in literary activities, having kept a diary since his youth.

=== 1940–1948: Emerging composer ===
Ned Rorem's institutional education timeline

American Conservatory (Sowerby): 1938–40
Northwestern University (Nolte): 1940–42
Curtis Institute (Menotti & Scalero): 1942
Juilliard (Wagenaar): 1943–46 (BA); 1946–48 (MM)
Tanglewood (Copland): Summers of 1946 & 1947

Rorem attended the School of Music of Northwestern University in 1940, studying composition with Alfred Nolte and piano with Harold Van Horne. Under the latter he focused on standard repertoire by Bach, Beethoven and Chopin, but transferred to the Curtis Institute of Music in 1942. There, he studied composition and orchestration under Gian Carlo Menotti and counterpoint under Rosario Scalero. He had numerous compositions premiered, including The 70th Psalm (1943), a choral piece with orchestral accompaniment, and a Piano Sonata for Four Hands. Considering Scalero unprogressive, he left Curtis after a year; his parents disagreed with the decision and ceased providing him a regular allowance. Moving to New York in late 1943, to support himself he took a job as copyist for the composer Virgil Thomson, with whom he also studied orchestration and prosody. Via a mutual friend, he became acquainted with the conductor and composer Leonard Bernstein, and Bernstein introduced him to Aaron Copland. Rorem later attended two of the Tanglewood Music Center's summer sessions to study with Copland. Rorem later remarked in an article of The New York Times: "Well, I took the job with Virgil, became an instant fan of Aaron and Lenny, and for the next 42 years with many an up and a down I've remained staunch friends with all three men. Some weekend!"

Later in 1943 he enrolled in the Juilliard School and studied composition with Bernard Wagenaar. Rorem graduated from Juilliard with a Bachelor of Arts in 1946 and a Master of Music in 1948. While a student he worked as a piano accompanist for performers such as the dancer Martha Graham and the singer Éva Gauthier. Due to his interest in literature he became increasingly interested in composing art songs, and also wrote incidental music, ballet music and music for a puppet show. In 1948, his song The Lordly Hudson on a poem by Goodman won the Music Library Association's published song of the year award. That same year, his orchestral Overture in C won a Gershwin Prize and was premiered by New York Philharmonic under Mishel Piastro in May 1948. The positive reception of both these compositions was an important milestone in his career as an emerging composer.

=== 1949–1957: France and Morocco ===
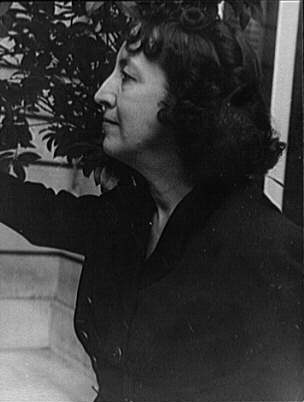
The arts patron Marie-Laure de Noailles (1949, Van Vechten) who allowed Rorem to stay in her Paris mansion and introduced him to other cultural figures of the city

Rorem later remarked that the 1940s were formative for charting his future career and by 1950 he was certain of being a composer. With money from the Gershwin Prize, he left for France in early 1949, though spent much of the next two years in Morocco. He was hugely productive in the comparatively quieter Morocco, and produced a variety of compositions in rapid succession. He later explained that "The best influence for a composer is four walls. The light must come from inside. When it comes from outside, the result is postcard music." (Note: Rorem 1968, p. 125) Among his earliest large-scale works, he wrote the ballet Melos in 1949, and both his Piano Concerto No. 2 and Symphony No. 1 1950. The ballet won the Prix de Biarritz in 1951, while the Symphony was premiered in Vienna in February 1951 by Jonathan Sternberg and the piano concerto in 1954 by Julius Katchen via French Radio. During this period he wrote numerous song cycles dedicated to a single textual source: Flight for Heaven (1950) to Robert Herrick; Six Irish Poems (1950) to George Darley; Cycle of Holy Songs (1951) to biblical texts; and To a Young Girl to W. B. Yeats. He composed his first opera, A Childhood Miracle, to Elliott Stein's libretto based on The Snow-Image, and Other Twice-Told Tales by Nathaniel Hawthorne. Though written in 1951, the opera was not premiered until May 10, 1955, in New York. He later received two further honors: the Lili Boulanger Memorial Fund Award in 1950 and a Fulbright Scholarship in 1951.

On the Fulbright Scholarship, in 1951 Rorem settled in Paris to study with Arthur Honegger, a representative from the Les Six group of neoclassicist music. Unlike most young American musicians in the city, he did not study with Nadia Boulanger, as she opined that her instruction might tarnish his already individual style. He became associated with the wealthy arts patron Marie-Laure de Noailles, at whose mansion he resided. Through her influence, he met with the leading Parisian cultural figures of his time, including other composers of Les Six, Francis Poulenc, Georges Auric and Darius Milhaud. Their proximity solidified the French influence of his style and he set numerous medieval French poems in the 1953 song cycle Poèmes pour la paix. Other compositions written in Paris include: Piano Sonata No. 2 (1950); two ballets, Ballet for Jerry (1951) and Dorian Gray (1952); Design for Orchestra (1953); The Poet's Requiem (1955); and Symphony No. 2. A Paris concert in 1953 featured solely Rorem's compositions.

=== 1957–1973: Return to the US ===
External videos
- 4 Poems of Walt Whitman (1957)
- Performance by Susan Graham (mezzo-soprano) and Malcolm Martineau (piano)

Rorem returned to the US in either 1957 or 1958 to further pursue composition. (Note: Modern sources are divided on the exact year Rorem returned to the US. Ewen (1982, p. 541) and Page (2022) give 1957, while McDonald (1989, p. 8) and Holmes, Tommasini & McDonald (2003, § para 4) give 1958.) By now, his music had attracted the attention of several important American musicians and ensembles, and most of his compositions from the 1960s onwards were commissions. In 1959, the Philadelphia Orchestra under Eugene Ormandy premiered Rorem's Eagles, a Whitman-inspired and dreamlike tone poem. (Note: The same piece was later performed by Leopold Stokowski for his 1964 debut with the Boston Symphony Orchestra.) His Symphony No. 3 (1958) was premiered by Bernstein and the New York Philharmonic in 1959 to critical praise; the New York Herald Tribune's music editor Jay S. Harrison called it "lavish, luscious, and luxe". Conversely, his first full-length opera, Miss Julie, was not well received at its 1965 premiere at the New York City Opera. Rorem received commissions from organizations such as the Elizabeth Sprague Coolidge Foundation, Ford Foundation and Koussevitzky Foundation among others. By this time, he was established as a neoromantic composer, who largely rejected a strict application of modernist techniques or emerging genres such as electroacoustic music.

Rorem held his first teaching position at the University of Buffalo from 1959 to 1960, during which he wrote 11 Studies for 11 Players. A few years later he taught composition at the University of Utah from 1965 to 1967. His short tenures were because he believed that "this is the kind of assignment that should not last more than two years as a teacher begins to believe what he says after that long a time and becomes sterile". His compositions of the time included more instrumental music, although songs remained a central aspect of his activities. These songs were largely set to 20th-century American poets, though copyright issues sometimes prevented their immediate publication. Among these was the song cycle for mezzo-soprano and piano, Poems of Love and Rain (1963), written to texts by W. H. Auden, Emily Dickinson, Howard Moss and Theodore Roethke. Premiered by Regina Sarfaty and Rorem at the piano on April 12, 1964, it included two different musicals settings for each of the poems.

Throughout the 1950s and 60s, Rorem struggled with alcoholism. He commented that "The minute a drop of wine touches my lips I begin to be this other person—an infantile regression takes place", though he insisted that he "not be categorized as an alcoholic because [he had] such a puritanical sense of order". Although he scheduled it carefully, he admitted to feeling a strong sense of guilt when drinking, which he considered detrimental to his artistic creativity. Rorem attended Alcoholics Anonymous meetings and used Antabuse, with little success. In late 1967, he became partners with the organist James Roland Holmes; their relationship offered enough stability for Rorem to abandon alcohol completely.

=== 1974–1999: Pulitzer and Curtis ===
When I got the Pulitzer, everything changed overnight. Of course, I was shocked because I thought I would never get it because of my wicked ways. To this day I can't believe those stuffy Pulitzer people would settle on me. But it sort of gives you a certain authority. My name is now always preceded by "Pulitzer Prize-winning composer." ... So if I die in a whorehouse, at least the obit will say, "Pulitzer Prize-Winning Composer Ned Rorem Dies in Whorehouse."

— Rorem in the Hartford Courant

In 1974 Rorem and Holmes bought a summer house in Nantucket, Massachusetts. His time there was generally peaceful and he later remarked that "I wrote Air Music, made pies, felt no competition, was content". There Rorem worked on seven different commissions concurrently between 1974 and 1975 for the American Bicentennial. One of these was Air Music: Ten Etudes for Orchestra for Thomas Schippers with the Cincinnati Symphony Orchestra, where each movement was limited to different combinations of instruments. (Note: Aside from Air Music, the other six American Bicentennial commissions were Assembly and Fall; Book of Hours; 8 Piano Etudes; Serenade; Sky Music; and Women's Voices.) Air Music would win the Pulitzer Prize for Music in 1976; Rorem later noted his surprise from the award, having been convinced that his music would not be accepted by "those stuffy Pulitzer people". Other major works of this time include the 1977 orchestral suite Sunday Morning, inspired by the poem of the same name by Wallace Stevens.

Rorem accepted his third teaching post in 1980 at the Curtis Institute, his alma mater, where he headed the composition department with David Loeb until 2001. His students at Curtis included Daron Hagen and David Horne; outside of Curtis, he taught Roger Briggs. During this time, Rorem's pace of composition did not diminish. He wrote compositions for varied genres, including The Santa Fe Songs (1980) song cycle for baritone and piano quartet and the String Symphony (1985), a recording of which by the Atlanta Symphony Orchestra won the 1989 Grammy Award for Best Orchestral Recording.

In 1993, Rorem wrote the Piano Concerto No. 4 for Left Hand and Orchestra for his Curtis colleague with an injured right hand, Gary Graffman. The following year, his earlier opera Miss Julie was revived at the Manhattan School of Music Opera Theater. For the 1997 New York Festival of Song, Rorem wrote the large-scale song cycle Evidence of Things Not Seen, described as his "masterwork" by Daniel Lewis in the Times. A deeply personal work, the composition included settings of 36 texts by 24 poets, split into three larger sections: "Beginnings" for optimistic and forward-looking songs, "Middles" exploring coming of age and the devastation of war, as well as the final "Ends" that concerns death, particularly Rorem's friends killed by AIDS. With an hour and a half duration, it called for a soprano, mezzo-soprano, tenor, and baritone with piano accompaniment. The music critic Peter G. Davis called it "one of the musically richest, most exquisitely fashioned, most voice-friendly collections of songs", while Rorem himself lauded it as his best work. His partner Holmes died in 1999, after having lived with Rorem for 32 years.

=== 2000–2022: Later years ===
In the Times, Daniel Lewis noted that "Well into the 21st century, when quite a few of his modernist critics had passed into irrelevance, Mr. Rorem was still going strong. Admirers turned up at concerts to help celebrate his 80th birthday, his 85th, his 90th, his 95th; the audiences looked that much older each time around, while he looked pretty much as always". The music critic Steve Smith furthered that compared to the birthday anniversaries of Britten, Verdi and Wagner, "Mr. Rorem's birthday has occasioned less fanfare, seemingly confirming his oft-repeated assertions about the invisibility of living composers". This latter sentiment would be a focus of his tenure while president of the American Academy of Arts and Letters from 2000 to 2003. During this time he engaged in a series of larger works, beginning with Aftermath (2002) a ten-part song cycle written in response to the September 11 attacks. Set to English-language poets from the 18th-century to present day, it was written for medium voice accompanied by violin, cello and piano. What followed next was concertante: a Cello Concerto (2002) and Flute Concerto (2002), both written in memory of Thomas Schippers. His next concerto, the 2003 Mallet Concerto, was compared by the writer Bret Johnson in its evocation and sparseness to his first two symphonies. In 2006, his opera Our Town premiered at the Indiana University Opera Theater, Bloomington.

From 2010 onwards, Rorem essentially ceased composing, explaining that "I've kind of said everything I have to say, better than anyone else". Two exceptions were the 2013 song "How Like a Winter", based on Shakespeare's Sonnet 97, as well as his final work, Recalling Nadia, a brief organ piece written in 2014. Regardless, Rorem himself noted that by then he did not receive commissions, "but then, nobody I know does". His last years were instead spent in the care of his niece, playing piano, doing crossword puzzles and walking through Central Park. Rorem died at home in Manhattan on November 18, 2022, at age 99.

== Music ==
Although Rorem wrote works for piano, orchestra and chamber ensemble and solo instruments, he considered all of his music vocal and song-like in nature. Often described as a neoromantic composer, Rorem generally rejecting the emergence of strict modernist aesthetics. He wrote in a generally tonal manner, Grove Music Online asserts that he did so with considerable diversity, complexity and potency.

=== Songs ===
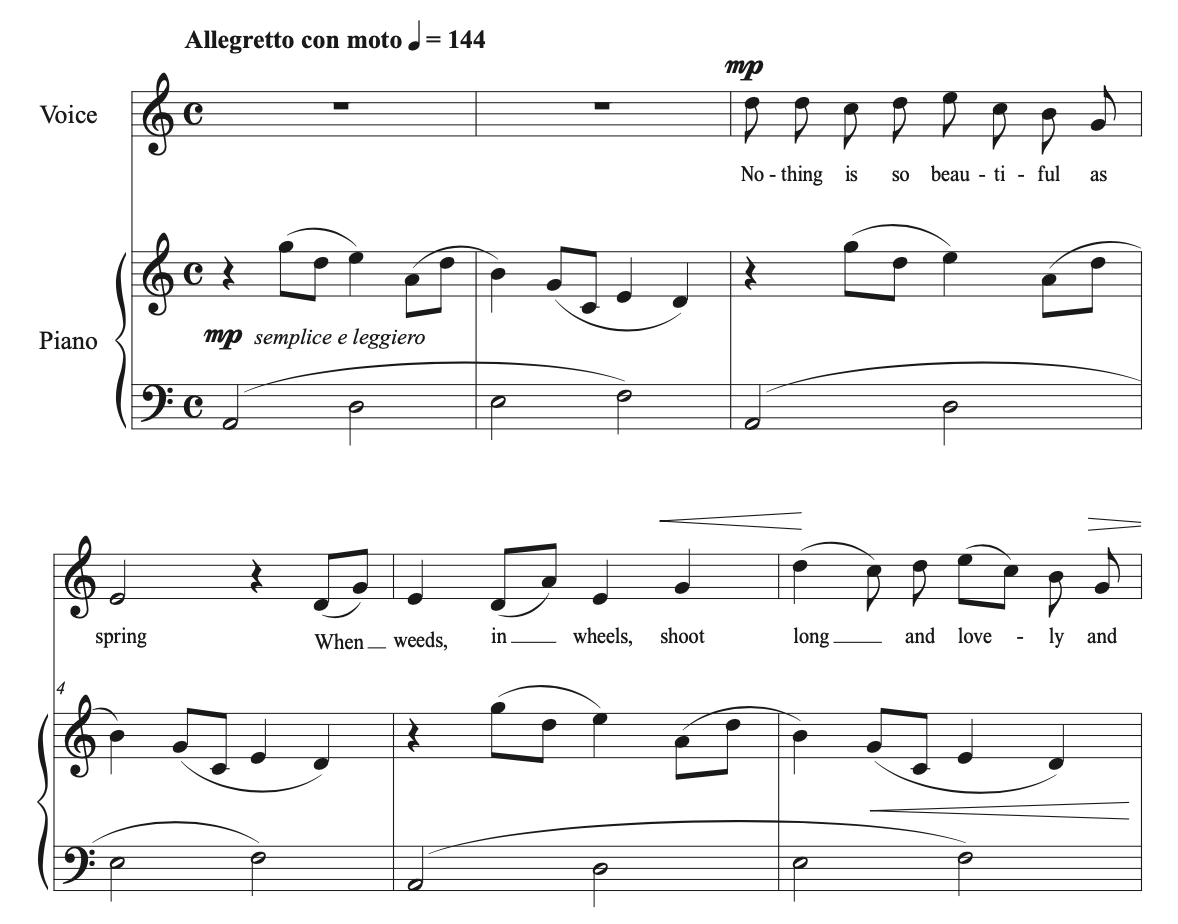
Opening measures of Spring (1947) by Rorem. The piano's left hand employs ground bass below a higher melody

He is best known for his art songs, of which he wrote more than 500. (Note: While older publications such as Holmes, Tommasini & McDonald (2003, § para 7) approximate Rorem's song output as "nearly 400", the music critic Tim Page explains that "By the time Mr. Rorem was 40, he had written more than 400 such songs", and that by his death "In all, he wrote ... more than 500 songs".) Many are coupled into some thirty or so song cycles, written from the early 1940s to 2000s. (Note: Many of his earliest songs remain unpublished; his first published cycle was Flight for Heaven (1950), a setting of nine poems by the lyric poet Robert Herrick, along with a piano interlude. See Henry (1986, pp. 12–14) for an overview on Rorem's early unpublished song cycles.) Rorem stressed the importance of a cycle's overall structure, paying close attention to the song order, progression of keys and transition between songs. He also emphasized theatricality, aiming to convey an overarching message via a unified emotional affect or mood. Like in other genres, the musicologist Philip Lieson Miller remarked that "Rorem's chosen field of song is not for the avant garde and he must be classified as ... conservative", and that "he has never striven for novelty". Rorem's strict definitions of what constitutes a song has molded them to be typically be single-voice and piano settings of lyrical poems of moderate length. He named songs by Monteverdi, Schumann, Poulenc and the Beatles as particular favorites. To obtain certain effects, however, Rorem has occasionally experimented with more modernist sentiments, such as intense chromaticism, successive modulations and alternating time signatures.

Rorem's main interest in the art song is the setting of poetry, rather than the sound of the human voice. Numerous commentators have lauded his abilities in prosody, with Grove Music Online noting that he "sets words with naturalness and clarity, without compromising the range and scope of vocal lines". The vast majority of Rorem's songs are set in English and he has criticized American colleagues who prioritize setting other languages over English. In his early years, he was particularly devoted to the poems of his friend Paul Goodman, and later set many works by Theodore Roethke. Rorem often composed entire cycles to the poetry of a single writer: John Ashbery, Witter Bynner, Demetrios Capetanakis, George Darley, Frank O'Hara, Robert Herrick, Kenneth Koch, Howard Moss, Sylvia Plath, Wallace Stevens, Alfred, Lord Tennyson, and Walt Whitman, to whom he dedicated three cycles. His few settings in other languages include French poems by Jean-Antoine de Baïf, Jean Daurat, Olivier de Magny, Henri de Régnier, Pierre de Ronsard, as well as ancient Greek texts by Plato.

Many of Rorem's songs are accompanied by piano, though some have mixed instrumental ensemble or orchestral accompaniment. A pianist himself, his accompaniment parts for the instrument are not completely secondary to the voice and more a "full complement to the melody". They include motives to emphasize textual elements—such as rain and clouds—and are wildly diverse in function, sometimes responding to the voice in counterpoint or simply doubling the vocal line. He sometimes uses the Renaissance-derived ground bass technique of a slow and repeated bassline in the left hand. Reflecting on his piano accompaniments, the writer Bret Johnson describes Rorem's musical hallmarks as "chiming piano, rushing triplets, sumptuous harmonies".

=== Operas ===
External videos
- Final aria-monologue from Our Town
- Performance by Marnie Breckenridge

Only two full-length operas were written by Rorem: Miss Julie (1965) and Our Town (2005). Miss Julie was not well-received; the music critic Harold C. Schonberg commented that his melodies were bland and lacked individuality. Holmes explained that Rorem himself "contends that song specialists cannot automatically turn out good operas any more than opera composers can turn out true songs: a gift for tune and a gift for tragedy do not always join hands". The opera's libretto was written by Kenward Elmslie, itself based on the play of the same name by August Strindberg. Rorem revised it for a more successful revival in 1979; it was again revived again in 1994 at the Manhattan School of Music Opera.

His second full-length opera, Our Town, was written 40 years later on the play of the same name by Thornton Wilder. It received a successful 2006 premiere at the Indiana University Opera Theater and was later performed at the Juilliard Opera Center, New York (2008) and the Central City Opera, Denver (2013). The music critic Joshua Barone noted that it is "a tastefully restrained echo of the play's text that has found a home on smaller stages but deserves bigger ones". The play's already small-scale set and condense narrative was matched by Rorem's setting as a chamber opera and Johnson explained that "the economy of resources may well be the key to the opera's mobility and then its success". The work's final monologue-aria from the character Emily Webb is particularly well-regarded and often standard repertoire for soprano singers.

Throughout his career Rorem wrote some six small one-act operas, many of which do not fit squarely into the genre. The first of these was A Childhood Miracle of 1951, which had to wait three years for its premiere in New York 1955. Rorem wrote his own libretto for his 1958 opera based on Chaucer's "The Pardoner's Tale", The Robbers. His 1961 two-act opera The Anniversary was never performed. It included a libretto by Jascha Kessler and was, unusually for Rorem, based on the serialist tone row which he included on the title page. Rorem wrote the one-act Bertha (1968) to a libretto by Kenneth Koch. The same year he wrote the three-act Three Sisters who are Not Sisters (1971), his second collaboration with Stein as the librettist. The 1970s saw his two final short operas: Fables (1971), 5 brief scene based on La Fontaine's Fables; and Hearing (1976) on a libretto by Holmes based on Rorem's song cycles.

=== Orchestral works ===
Rorem's three numbered symphonies were written in a span of eight years during the 1950s. They have remained relatively "ostracized", even during the late 20th-century revival of neoromanticism. The music critic David Hurwitz remarked that "Ned Rorem's symphonies are shot through with long, lyrical melodies that some observers might relate to his gifts as a songwriter, but strike me as more likely inspired by the "Sunrise" sequence from Ravel's Daphnis et Chloë–music so strikingly lovely that the beauty it describes can only exist in the world of fantasy and make-believe."

Rorem's Symphony No. 1 (1950) is cast in four fairly brief movements: I: Maestoso, II: Andantino, III: Largo, and IV: Allegro; the composer himself noted that it "could easily be called a Suite". The AllMusic critic Blair Sanderson considered it the most lyrical and gentle of his symphonies. His Symphony No. 2 (1956) is cast in 3 movements, I: Broad, Moderate; II: Tranquillo; III: Allegro. They are of highly unequal proportion—the second movement and the third movement combined being less than half the length of the first movement—akin to the structure of Symphony No. 6 by Dmitri Shostakovich. Both the first and second symphonies are infrequently performed; the second in particularly had not been performed since 1959 until, as the composer puts it, "José Serebrier resurrected" it 43 years later. The Third Symphony (1958) is cast in five movements: I: Passacaglia, II: Allegro molto vivace, III: Largo, IV: Andante, V: Allegro molto. It is the best known of Rorem's numbered symphonies, described by Sanderson as "the most fully realized, [with] resilient rhythms and cogent structures". Hurwitz opines that it should be among the "great American symphonies". Rorem later arranged the Scherzo movement for wind orchestra in 2002.

=== Piano music ===
From 1948 onwards, Rorem wrote numerous pieces for solo piano, usually dedicated to relatives or close friends. Many of these were written for his partner Holmes, and others are named for their recipient, such as For Shirley (1989) and For Ben (1999). Johnson described most of them as brief sketches that contained precedents for his later works. His earliest published piano work was the 1948 set A Quiet Afternoon, written for his sister's children.

Among his main piano compositions are three sonatas written in his early years 1948, 1949 and 1954. Barone singles out the "sparking Toccata" third movement from the First Sonata, noting that it is a common encore for pianists. A few months after its publication, Rorem published the Toccata as a separate piece.

== Legacy ==
Near his death, Rorem was described as the "elder statesman of American art song, prolific prose writer, [and] pioneer of gay liberation".

— Barone in The New York Times

Rorem's reputation primarily revolves around art songs, during a time when the genre lacked interest from other American composers. Since the 1950s, he has been described as the "America's foremost composer of art songs", a designation echoed by the choral conductor Robert Shaw. Miller ranks him highly with the British song composers Ralph Vaughan Williams, Peter Warlock, Gerald Finzi and Benjamin Britten. His mentor Thomson characterized him as "an American Poulenc", explained by Grove Music Online as due to his expression of "restraint, wit, elegance and direct yet unsentimental expressivity" Although his music for orchestra, piano and chamber ensemble is substantial, it less known than his art songs. In light of his renown for small-scale works, Barone concludes that "You would be hard-pressed to find greatness in Mr. Rorem's vast oeuvre. But he has never aimed to be a Beethoven."

Rorem was called "an icon of gay history" by Barone, who cited his confidence and openness towards his sexuality. Barone furthered that although his writings were not central Gay liberation texts, they offered impetus for the movement. Rorem himself frequently commented as to the general unremarkability of both homosexuality and heterosexuality. In an interview with Rorem, the physician and writer Lawrence D. Mass compared Rorem's indifference to the writer William Hoffman—who "is similarly defensive about being called a gay writer"—and contrasted it to Lou Harrison—who is "proud to be a gay composer and interested in talking about what that might mean". Rorem similarly rejected any connection between a composer's music and sexuality, ridiculing the proposal that Schubert's supposed homosexuality had any effect on his music.

A dedicated diarist, Rorem wrote candidly on his and other men's sexuality, describing his relationships with Leonard Bernstein, John Cheever, Noël Coward and Tennessee Williams. Rorem's writings estimate his total romantic and sexual relationships as 3,000. He wrote extensively about music as well, collected the anthologies Music from Inside Out (1967), Music and People (1968), Pure Contraption (1974), Setting the Tone (1983), Settling the Score (1988), and Other Entertainment (1996). In 2005, Rorem was the subject of a documentary film, Ned Rorem: Word And Music, co-directed by James Dowell and John Kolomvakis.

== Writings ==
Books

- Rorem, Ned (1966). The Paris Diary. New York: George Braziller. OCLC 220705.
- —— (1967). The New York Diary. New York: George Braziller. OCLC 419642.
- —— (1967). Music from Inside Out. New York: George Braziller. OCLC 637907.
- —— (1968). Music and People. New York: George Braziller. OCLC 449570.
- —— (1970). Critical Affairs: a Composer's Journal. New York: George Braziller. ISBN 978-0-8076-0569-1. OCLC 91619.
- —— (1974). Pure Contraption. New York: Holt, Rinehart and Winston. ISBN 978-0-03-011021-4. OCLC 622504.
- —— (1974). The Final Diary. New York: Holt, Rinehart and Winston. ISBN 978-0-03-012251-4. OCLC 914568.
- —— (1978). An Absolute Gift. New York: Simon & Schuster. ISBN 978-0-671-22666-4. OCLC 3516613.
- —— (1983). Setting the Tone: Essays and a Diary. New York: Coward, McCann & Geoghegan. ISBN 978-0-698-11234-6. OCLC 869040899.
- —— (1984). Paul's Blues. New York: Red Ozier Press. OCLC 13481014.
- —— (1987). The Nantucket Diary. San Francisco: North Point Press. ISBN 978-0-86547-259-4. OCLC 16902949.
- —— (1988). Settling the Score: Essays on Music. New York: Doubleday. OCLC 915855727.
- —— (1994). Knowing When to Stop: A Memoir. New York: Simon & Schuster. ISBN 978-0-671-72872-4. OCLC 30593756.
- —— (1996). Other Entertainment: Collected Pieces. New York: Simon & Schuster. ISBN 978-0-684-82249-5. OCLC 34623876.
- —— (1997). Dear Paul, Dear Ned: The Correspondence of Paul Bowles and Ned Rorem. New York: Elysium Press. OCLC 37781932.
- —— (2005). Wings of Friendship: Selected Letters, 1944–2003. Washington: Shoemaker & Hoard. OCLC 57625802.
- —— (2006). Facing the Night: A Diary (1999–2005) and Musical Writings. Washington: Shoemaker & Hoard. OCLC 70230711.

Articles

- Rorem, Ned (Spring 1963). "Poulenc: A Memoir". Tempo (64): 28–29. doi:10.1017/S0040298200028035. JSTOR 943868. S2CID 145116275.
- —— (December 1968). "The Music of the Beatles". Music Educators Journal. 55 (4): 33–34+77–83. doi:10.2307/3392348. JSTOR 3392348. S2CID 143918646.
- —— (June 1974). "Why I Write as I Do". Tempo (109): 38–40. doi:10.1017/S0040298200055534. JSTOR 944099. S2CID 145320328.
- —— (April 20, 1975). "Some Notes (Mostly Sour) On Singing Songs". The New York Times.
- —— (December 1978). "Messiaen and Carter on Their Birthdays". Tempo (127): 22–24. doi:10.1017/S0040298200018374. JSTOR 945956. S2CID 145322090.
- —— (May 1, 1983). "A Composer Offers Some Candid Thoughts on His Art". The New York Times.
- —— (November 10, 1985). "Aaron Copland: 'He Is Like a Song-Filled Rock of Gibraltar'". The New York Times.
- —— (December 1990). "Leonard Bernstein (An Appreciation)". Tempo (175): 6–9. doi:10.1017/S0040298200012559. JSTOR 944575. S2CID 145197594.
- —— (1992). "Young Caeser". Grove Music Online. Oxford: Oxford University Press. doi:10.1093/gmo/9781561592630.article.O907008. ISBN 978-1-56159-263-0. (subscription, Wikilibrary access, or UK public library membership required)
- ——; Robbins, Jerome (2000). "'Ballet for Jerry': Three Letters from Jerome Robbins to Ned Rorem". Dance Chronicle. 23 (3): 263–273. doi:10.1080/01472520008569391. JSTOR 1567981. S2CID 191581741.
- —— (2001). "Flanagan, William". Grove Music Online. Oxford: Oxford University Press. doi:10.1093/gmo/9781561592630.article.09782. ISBN 978-1-56159-263-0. (subscription, Wikilibrary access, or UK public library membership required)
- —— (2013). "Goodman, Paul". Grove Music Online. Oxford: Oxford University Press. doi:10.1093/gmo/9781561592630.article.A2282988. ISBN 978-1-56159-263-0. (subscription, Wikilibrary access, or UK public library membership required)

== Recordings ==
Selected recordings of compositions by Ned Rorem
Year	Album	Performers	Label
1998	String Quartet No. 4	Emerson String Quartet	Deutsche Grammophon UPC 00028947432128}
2000	Songs of Ned Rorem	Susan Graham (mezzo), Malcolm Martineau (piano)	Erato 80222
2002	Gotham Ensemble Plays Ned Rorem	Thomas Piercy (clarinet) Rolf Shulte (violin), Judith Olson (piano), Angelina Réaux (soprano), Humbert Lucarelli (oboe), Delores Stevens (piano)	Albany Records TROY520
2003	Three Symphonies	José Serebrier (conductor), Bournemouth Symphony Orchestra	Naxos Records 8.559149
2006	Songs of Ned Rorem	Charles Bressler (tenor), Phyllis Curtin (soprano), Gianna D'Angelo (soprano), Donald Gramm (bass), Regina Sarfaty (mezzo-soprano), Rorem (piano)	Other Minds Records 1009-2
2013	Piano Album I – Six Friends	Carolyn Enger (piano)	Naxos Records 8.559761

== Awards and honors ==
- 1950: Lili Boulanger Memorial Fund Award
- 1951: Fulbright Fellowship
- 1957: Guggenheim Fellowship
- 1968: Award from the National Institute of Arts and Letters
- 1976: Pulitzer Prize for Music
- 1977: Honorary doctorate from Northwestern University
- 1977: Guggenheim Fellowship
- 2003: ASCAP's Lifetime Achievement Award
- 2004: Chevalier de l'Ordre des Arts et des Lettres
