= List of songs recorded by Christina Aguilera =

Songs by American singer

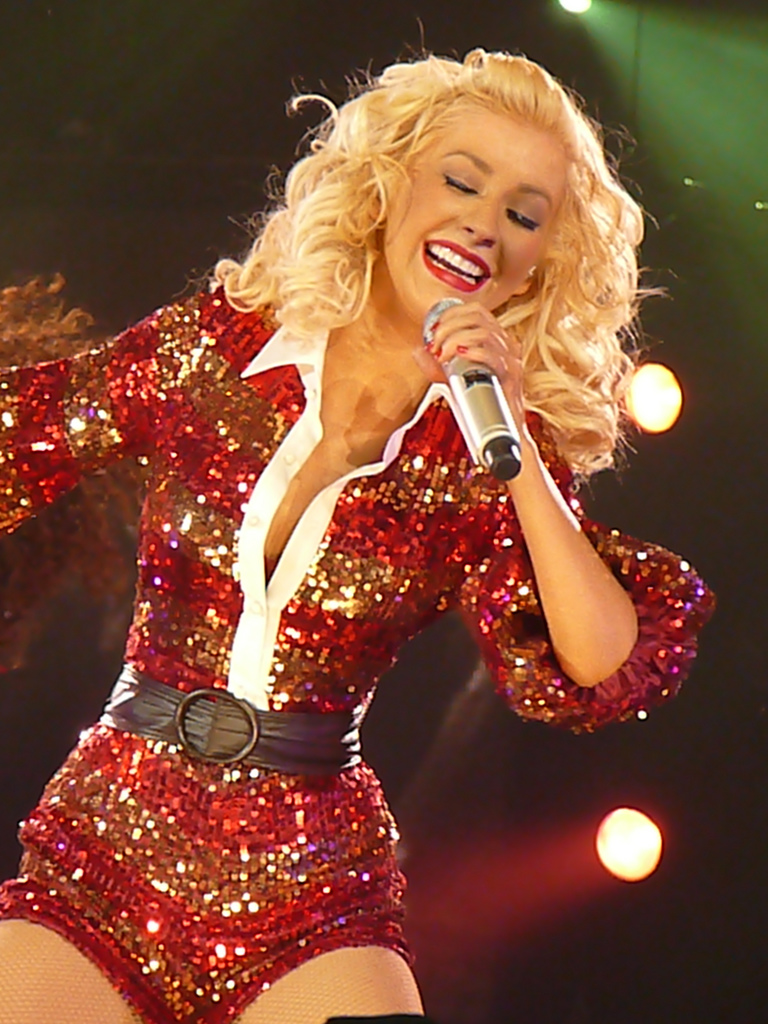
Aguilera performing on the Back to Basics Tour in December 2006

American singer Christina Aguilera's recording career began in 1994 at the age of thirteen, following the cancellation of The Mickey Mouse Club. Between 1994 and 1995, Aguilera recorded a series of songs, which were eventually released as a demo album under the name Just Be Free (2001). She also moved to Japan and recorded a duet with Japanese singer Keizo Nakanishi titled "All I Wanna Do". She returned to the United States and in 1998, she signed a contract with RCA Records and was chosen to perform the song "Reflection" for the soundtrack of the 1998 Disney animated feature Mulan. She followed this with albums Christina Aguilera (1999), Mi Reflejo (2000), My Kind of Christmas (2000), Stripped (2002), Back to Basics (2006), Bionic (2010), Lotus (2012), Liberation (2018) and Aguilera (2022).

She has recorded and released many songs throughout her career, topping the US Billboard Hot 100 various times with the songs "Genie in a Bottle", "What a Girl Wants", "Come on Over Baby (All I Want is You)", "Lady Marmalade" and "Moves Like Jagger". She has also had various songs reach the top ten on the same chart including "I Turn to You", "Beautiful", "Ain't No Other Man", "Keeps Gettin' Better", "Feel This Moment" and "Say Something". Her songs have been inspired by a wide variety of genres including pop, R&B, soul, hip hop, rock, Latin, jazz, electronic, dance-pop, amongst others. Her song themes have also been diverse and controversial with her song "Dirrty" facing controversy for its sexual nature. The song also reached number one in the United Kingdom. Other songs of Aguilera which have charted on the Hot 100 include, "The Christmas Song", "Fighter", "Can't Hold Us Down", "The Voice Within", "Car Wash", "Hurt", "Candyman", "Not Myself Tonight" and "Your Body".

== Released songs ==
Key
†	Indicates single release
‡	Indicates song included on the deluxe version of the album

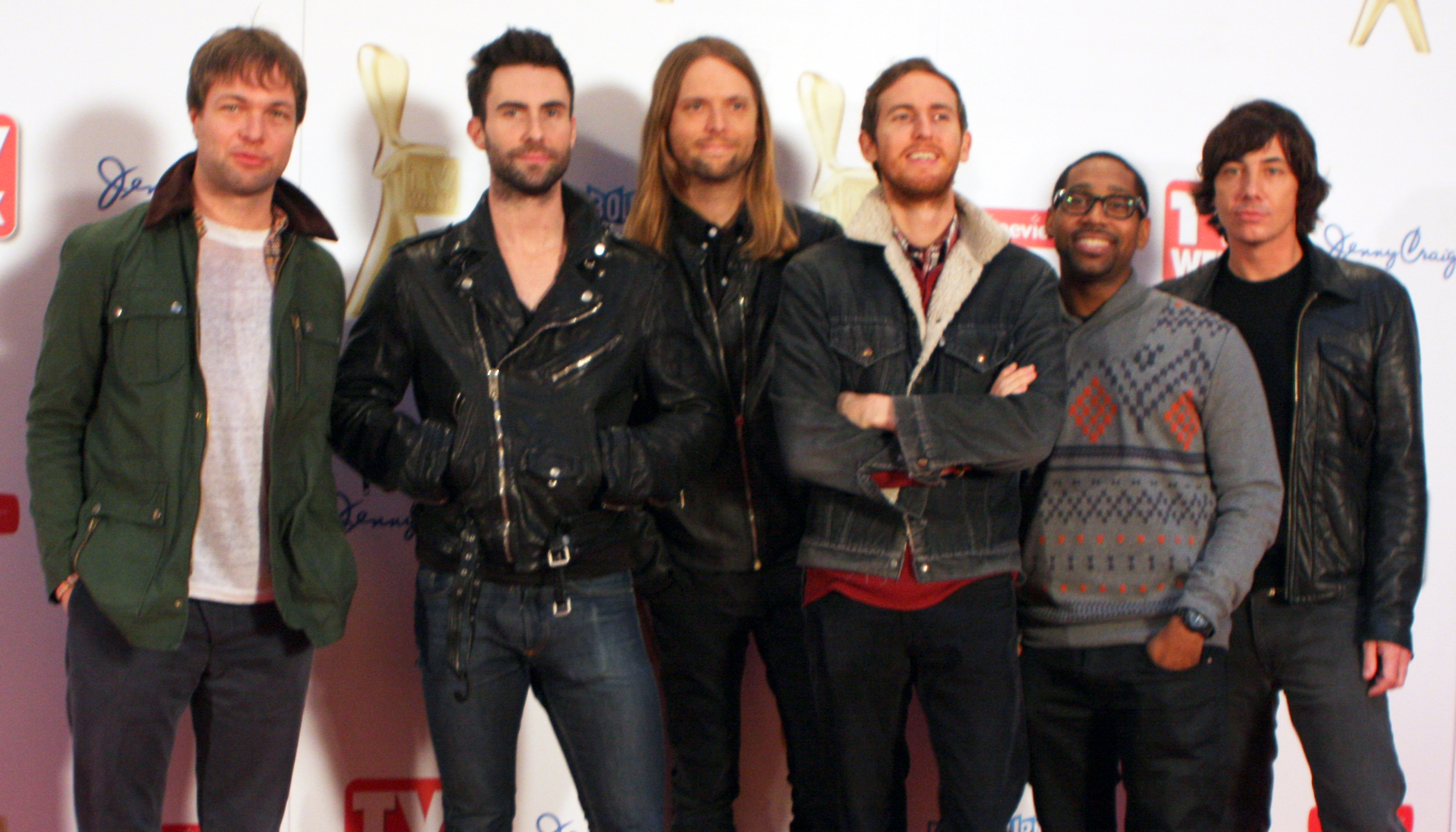
Maroon 5's single "Moves like Jagger" features Aguilera

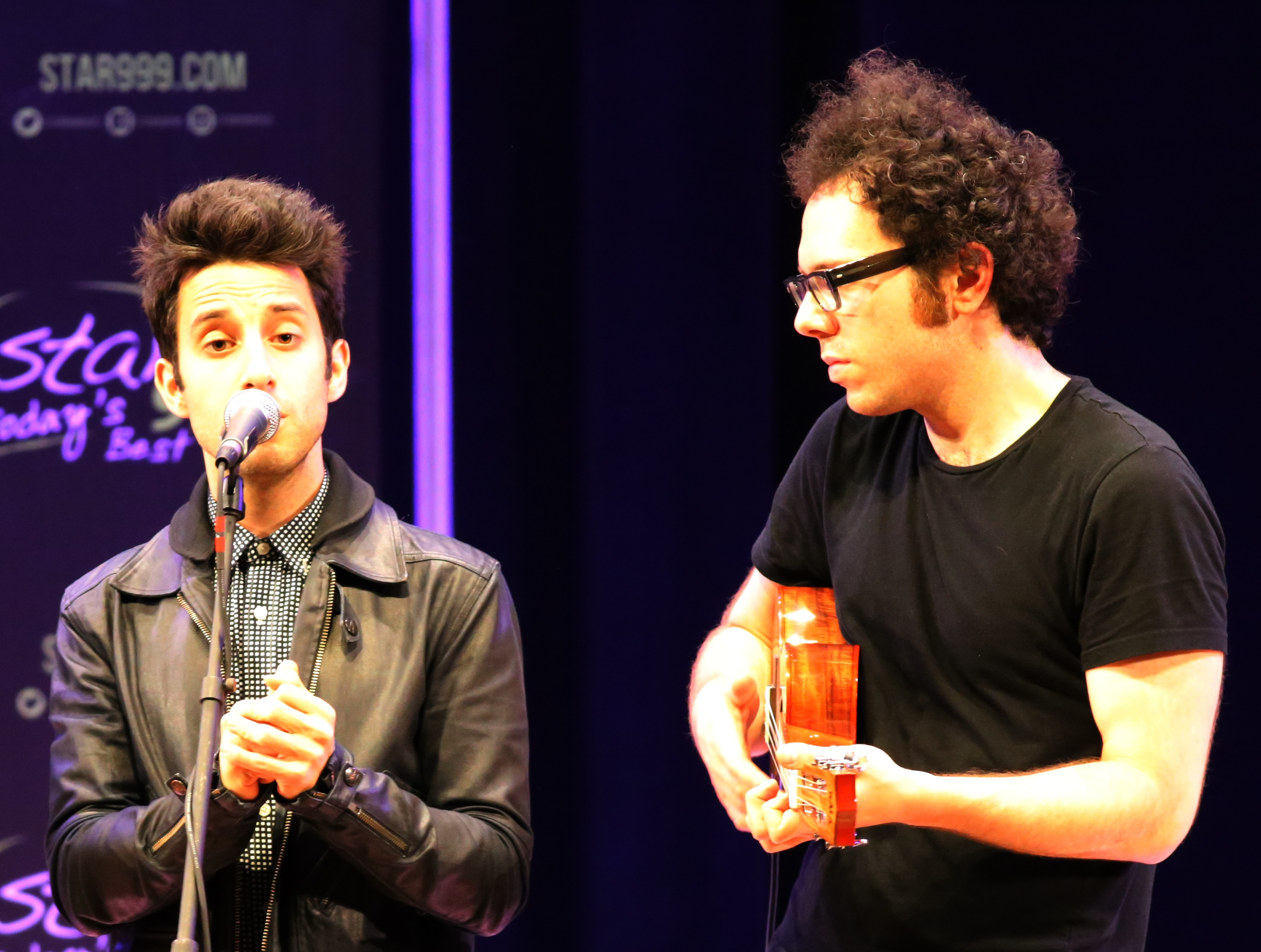
Aguilera appears on the re-recorded version of A Great Big World's single "Say Something", as well as on their 2019 song "Fall on Me"

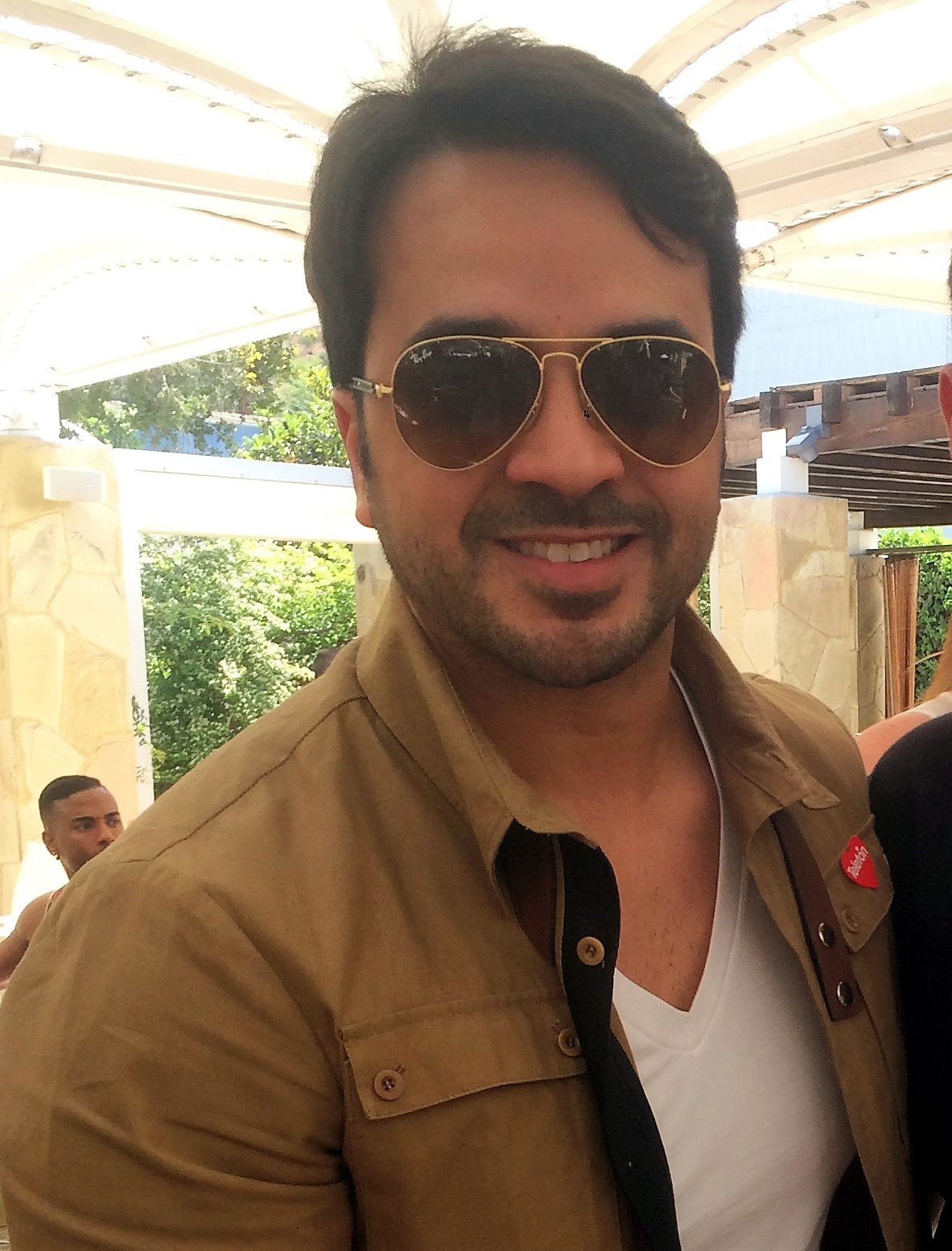
Luis Fonsi features on the song "Si No Te Hubiera Conocido"

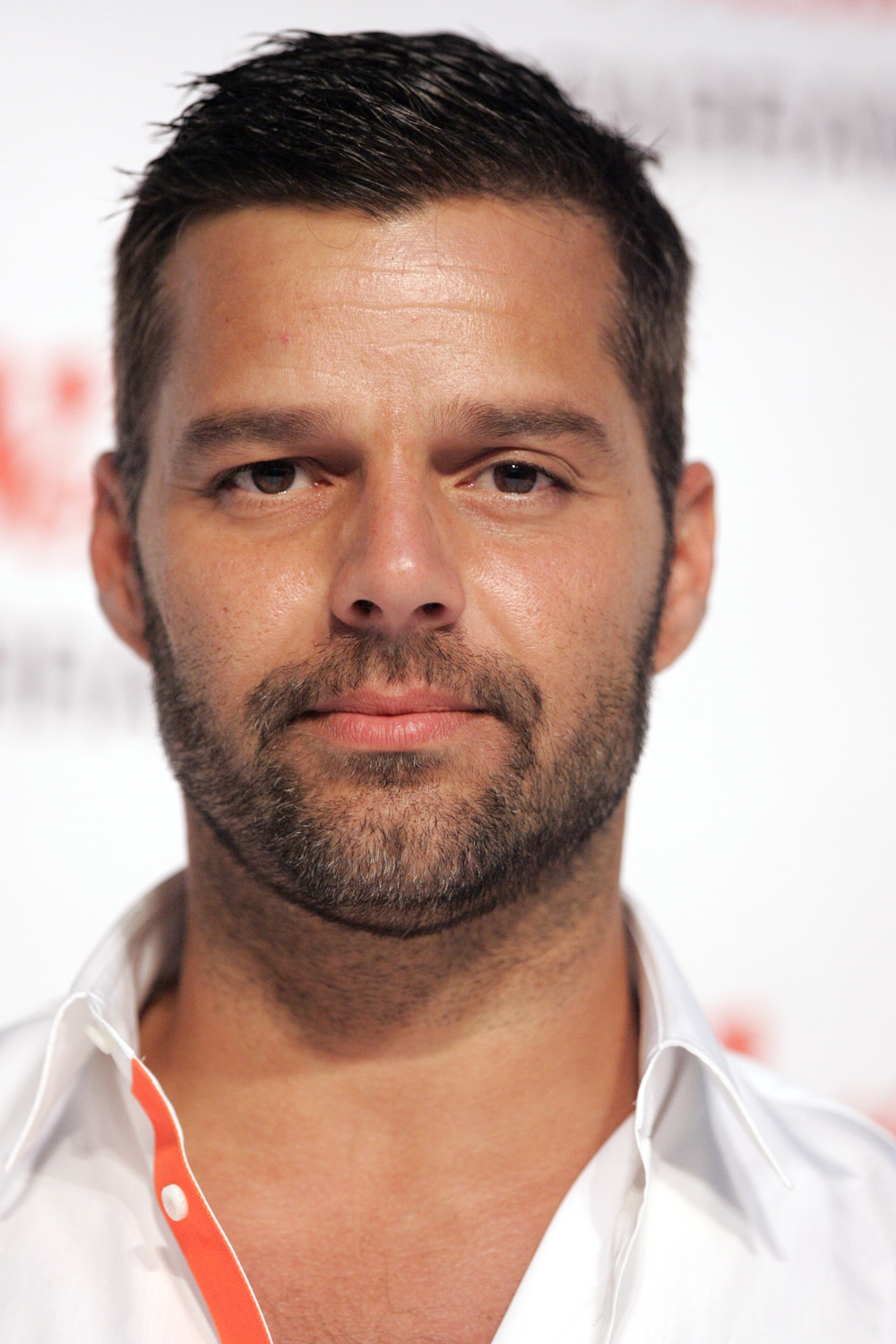
Aguilera is featured on Ricky Martin's "Nobody Wants to Be Lonely"

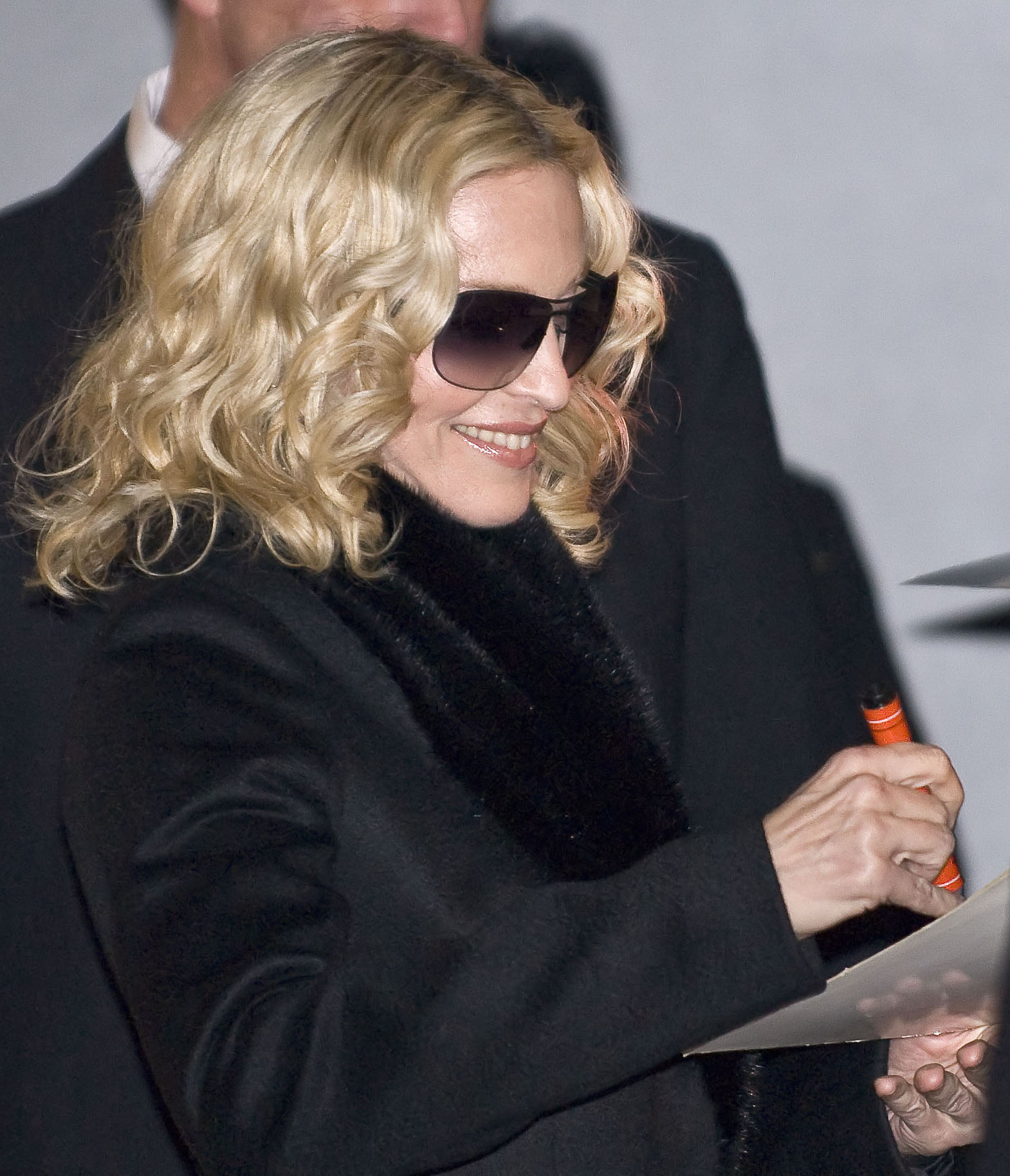
Aguilera is featured on the medley of "Like a Virgin" and "Hollywood" by Madonna

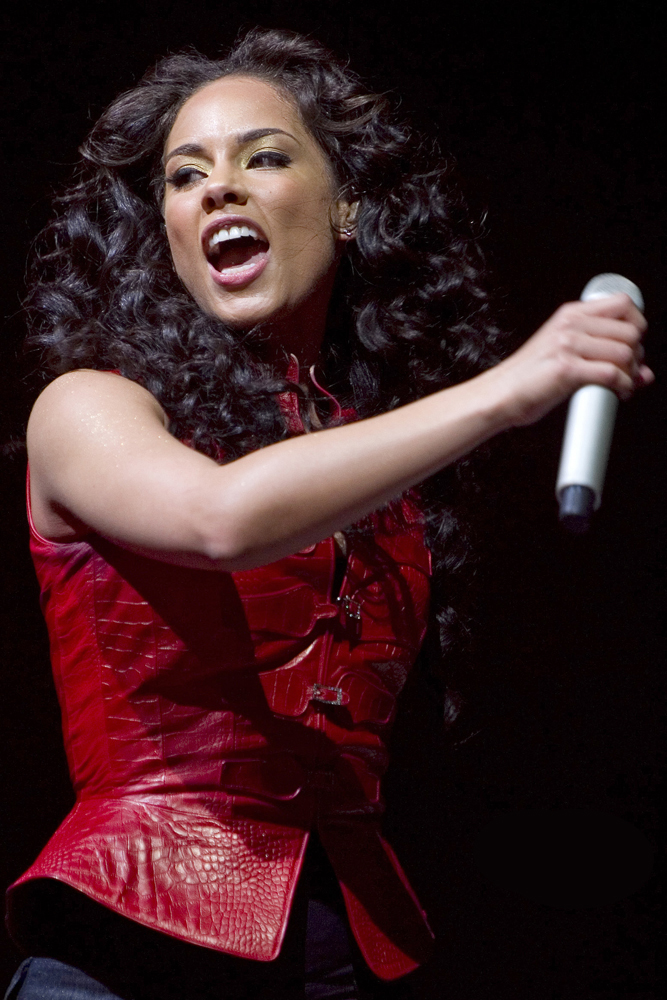
Alicia Keys wrote the track "Impossible" on Stripped

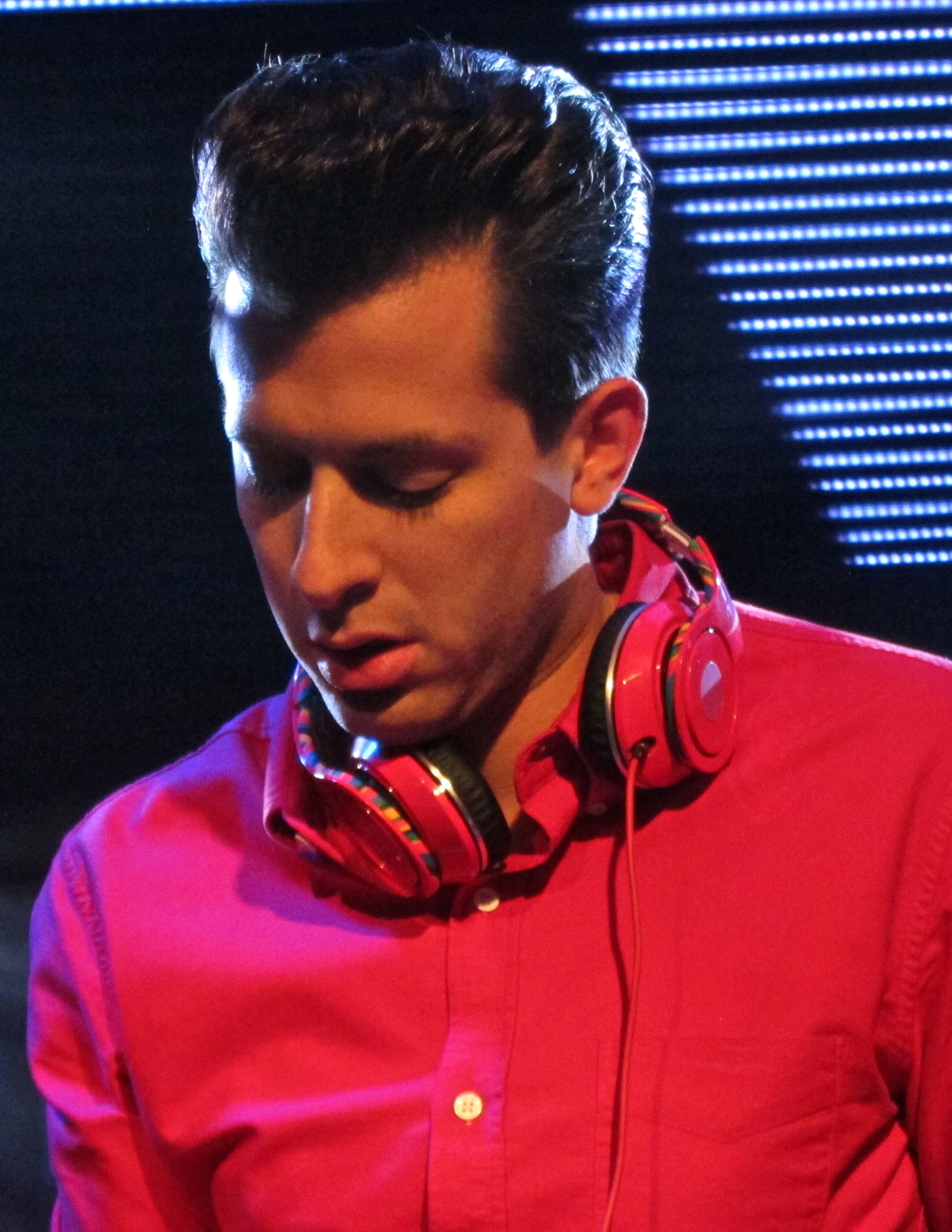
Mark Ronson's work on Aguilera's fifth studio album received universal acclaim

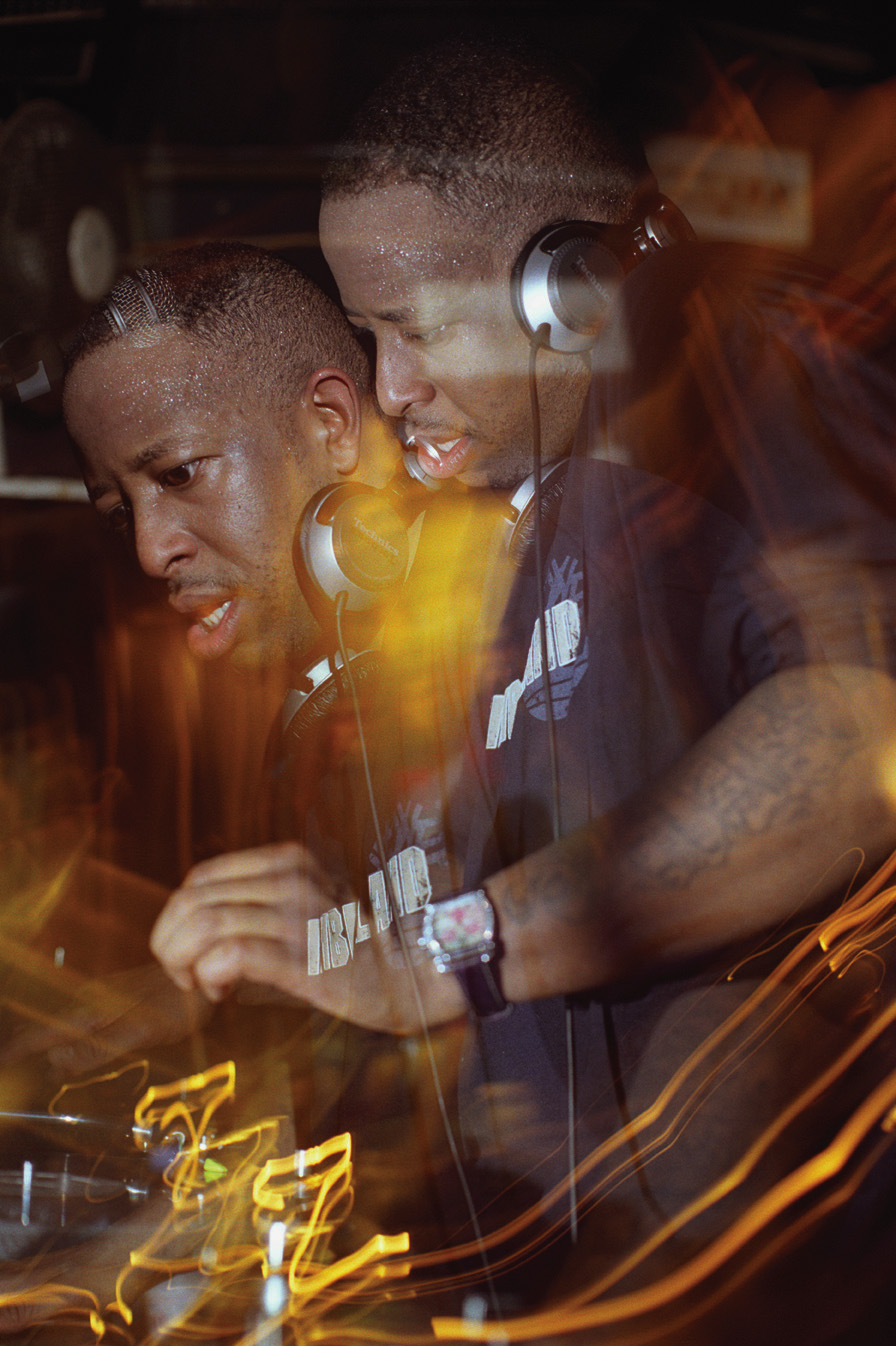
DJ Premier produced five songs on Back to Basics (2006)

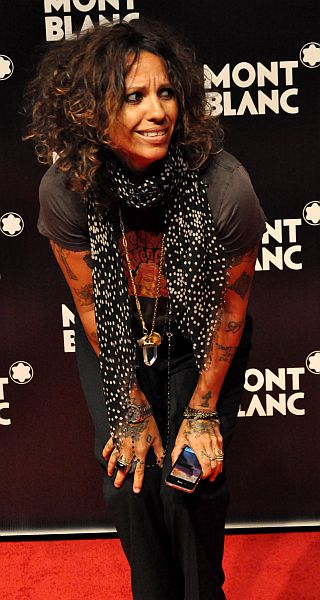
Linda Perry co-wrote songs on Stripped, Back to Basics, and Bionic

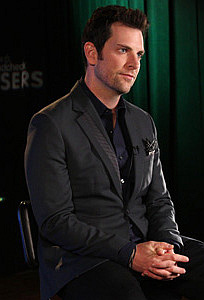
Aguilera is featured on the cover of "The Blower's Daughter" by Chris Mann

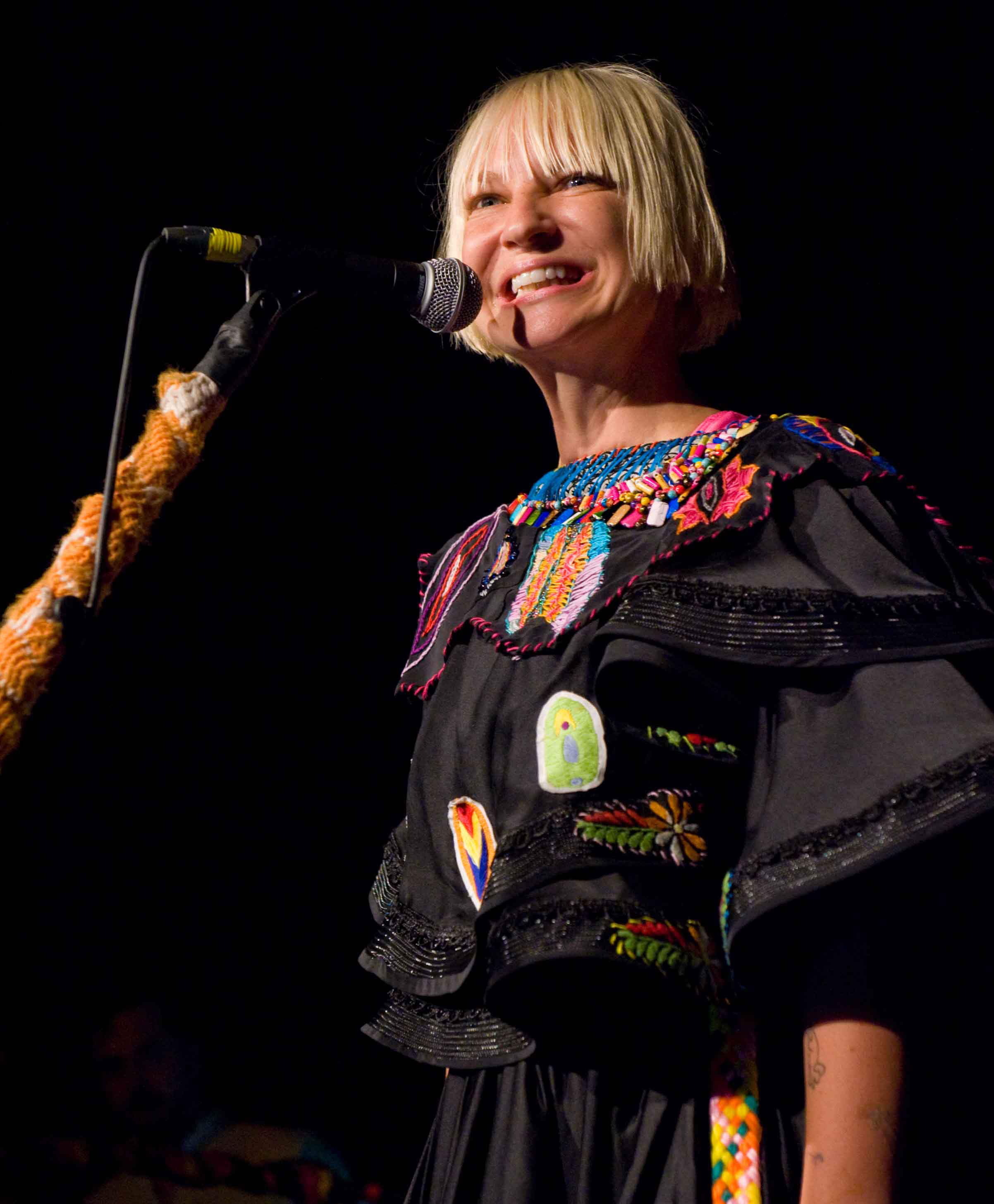
Sia co-wrote three songs on Bionic: "All I Need", "I Am", and "You Lost Me"

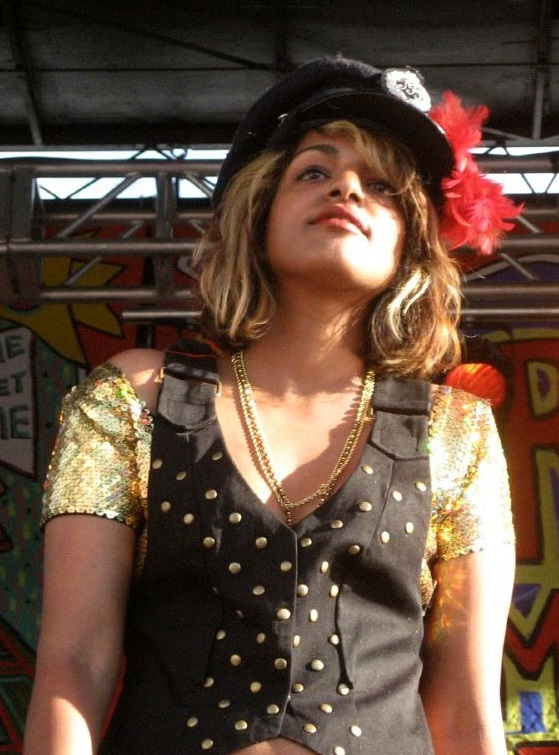
M.I.A. co-wrote "Elastic Love"

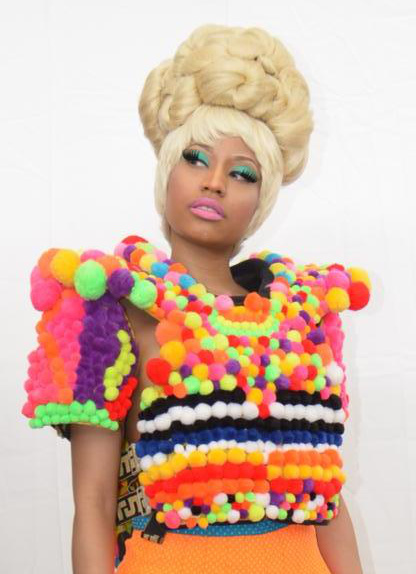
Nicki Minaj is credited as a featured artist on "Woohoo"

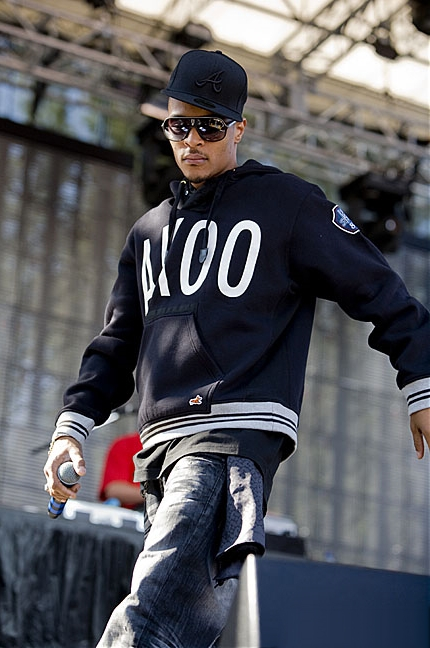
T.I.'s song "Castle Walls" features Aguilera

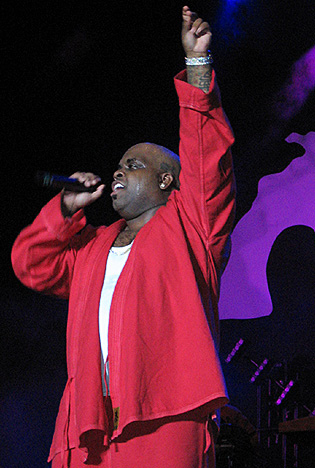
Aguilera features on a cover of "Baby, It's Cold Outside" by CeeLo Green. Green also appeared on Aguilera's song "Make the World Move" on Lotus

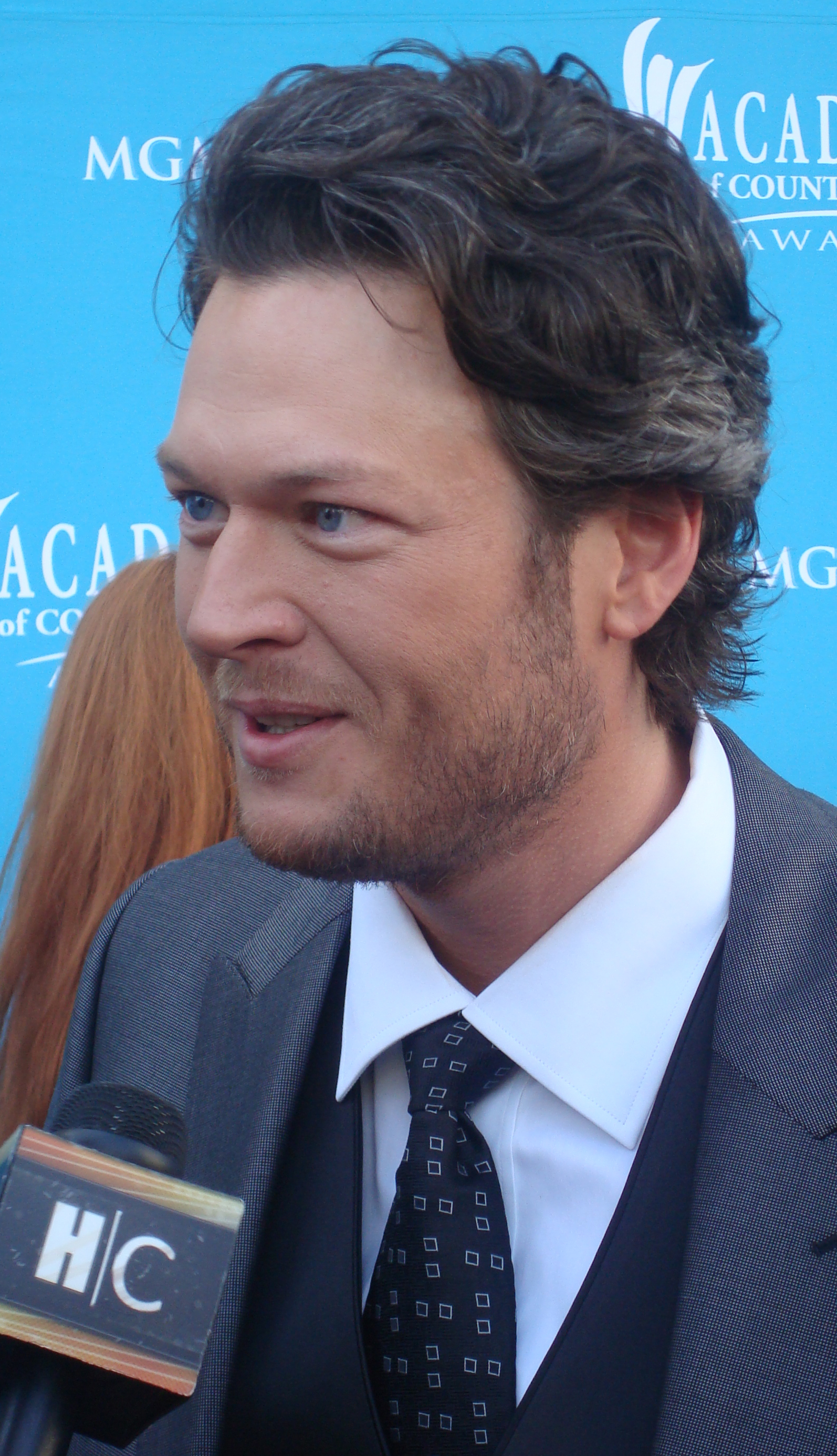
Blake Shelton appears as a guest vocalist on "Just a Fool"

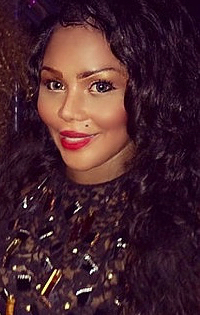
Rapper and songwriter Lil' Kim recorded two songs with Aguilera

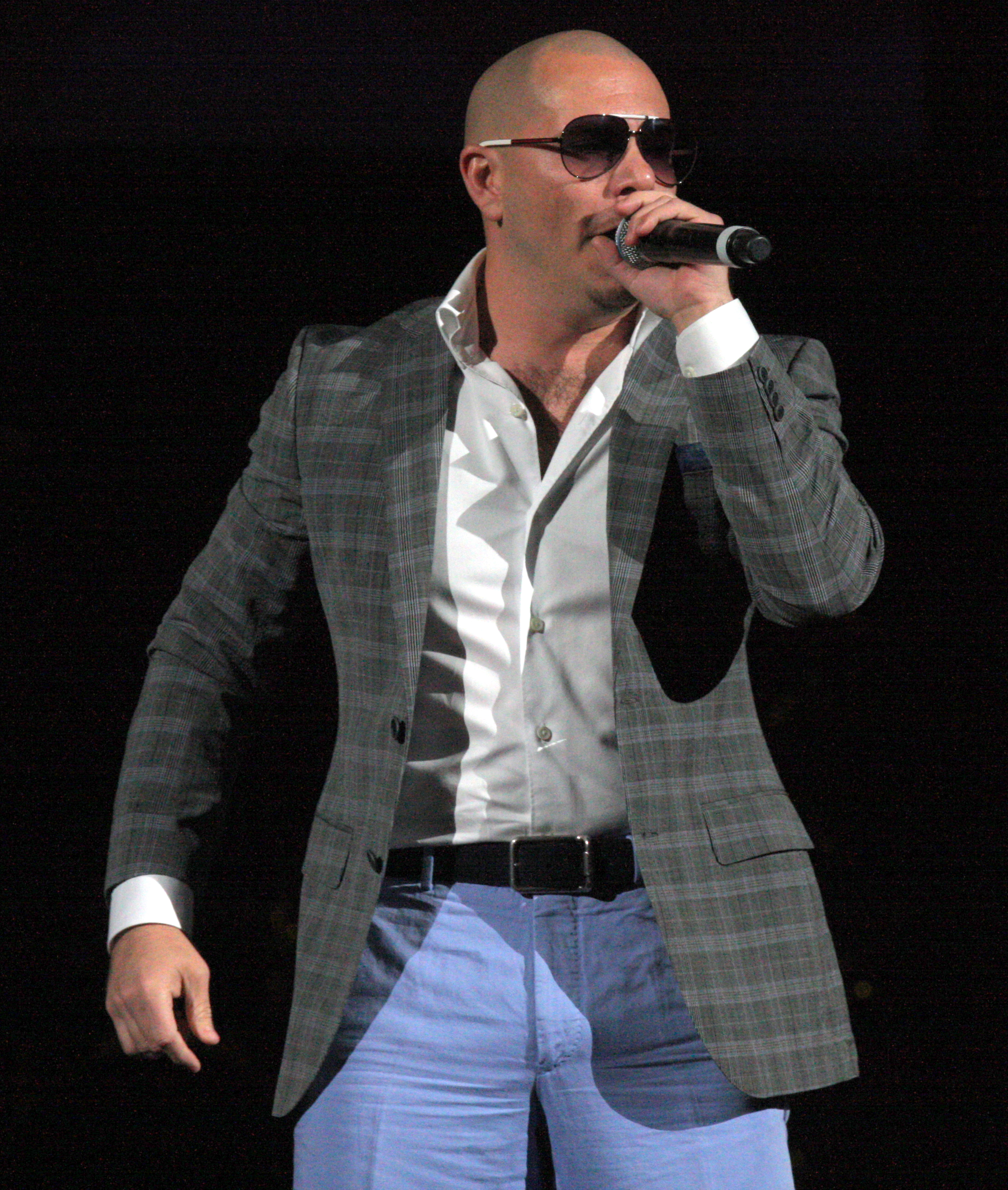
Aguilera is featured on Pitbull's "Feel This Moment"

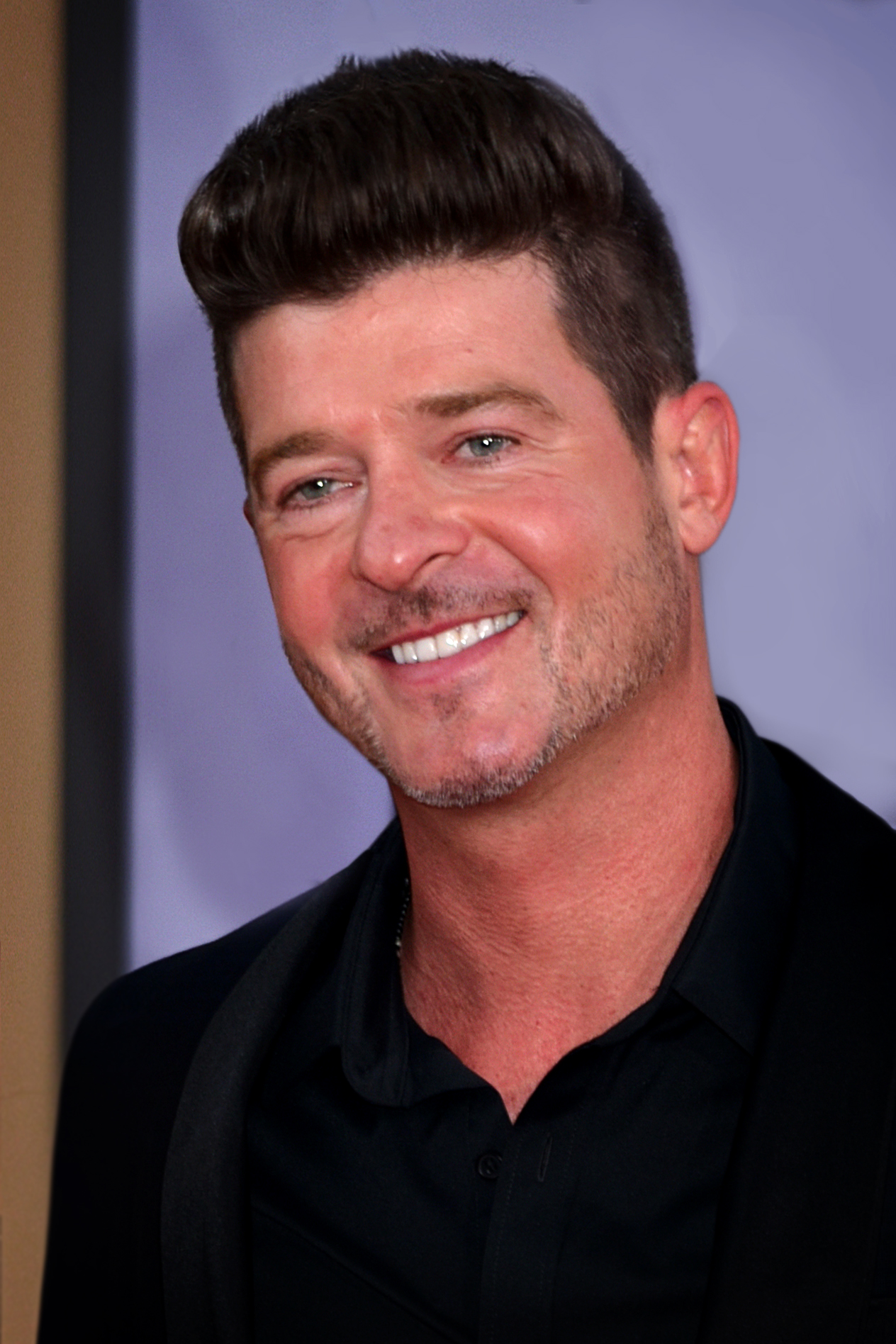
Robin Thicke co-wrote the song "When You Put Your Hands on Me" for Aguilera's debut album

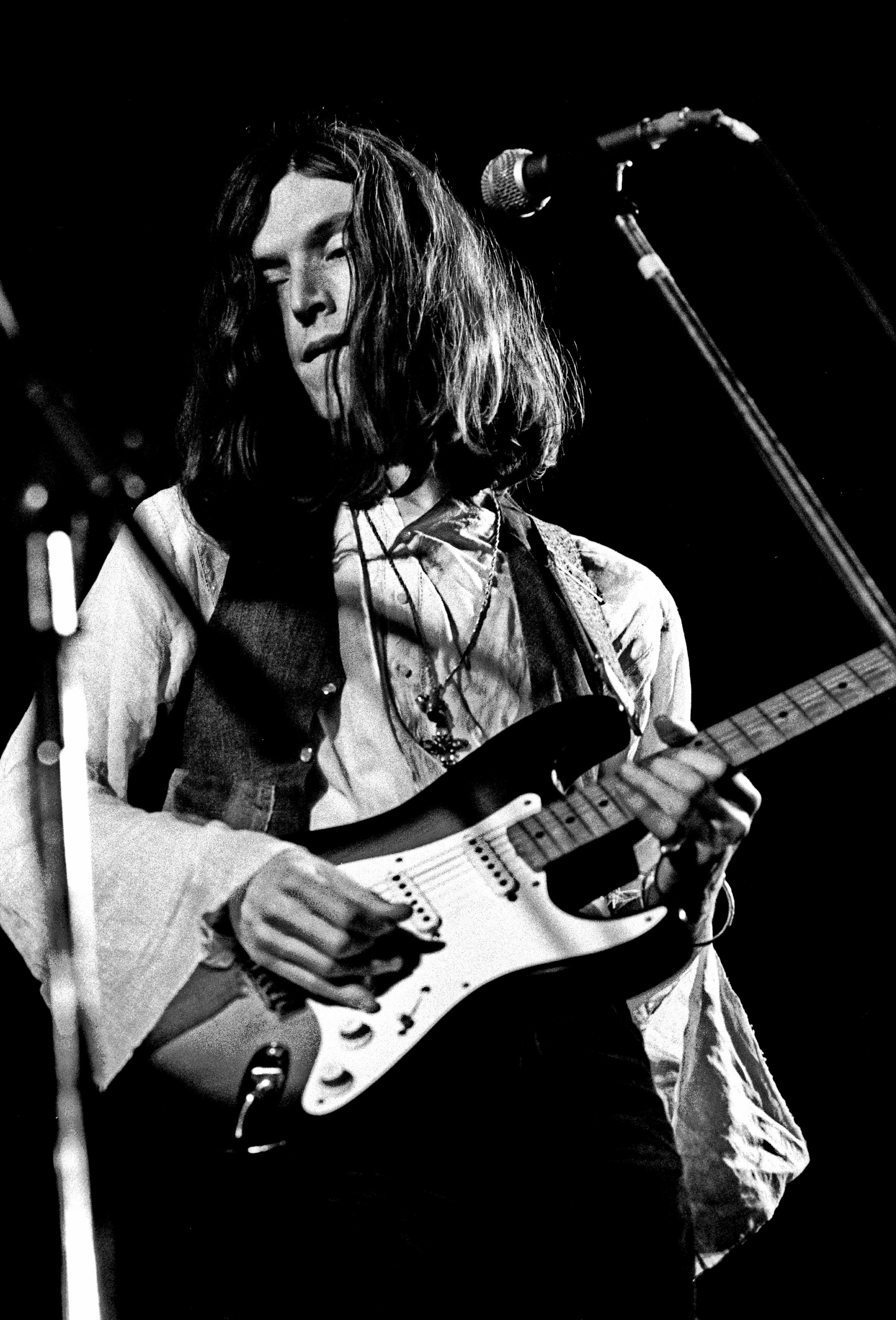
Award-winning musician Steve Winwood (pictured in 1973) is featured on "Makes Me Wanna Pray" (2006)

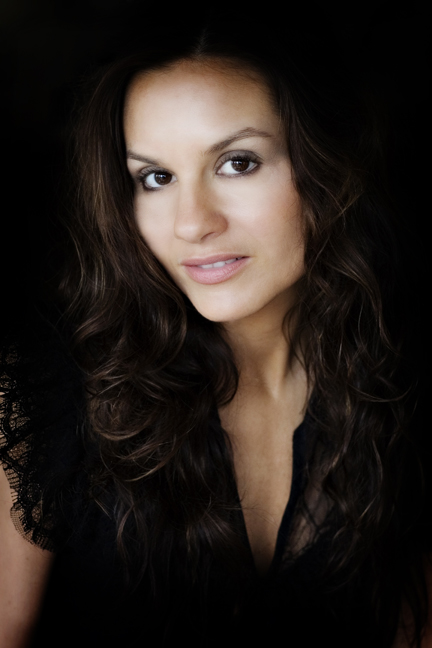
Kara DioGuardi co-wrote twelve songs on Back to Basics

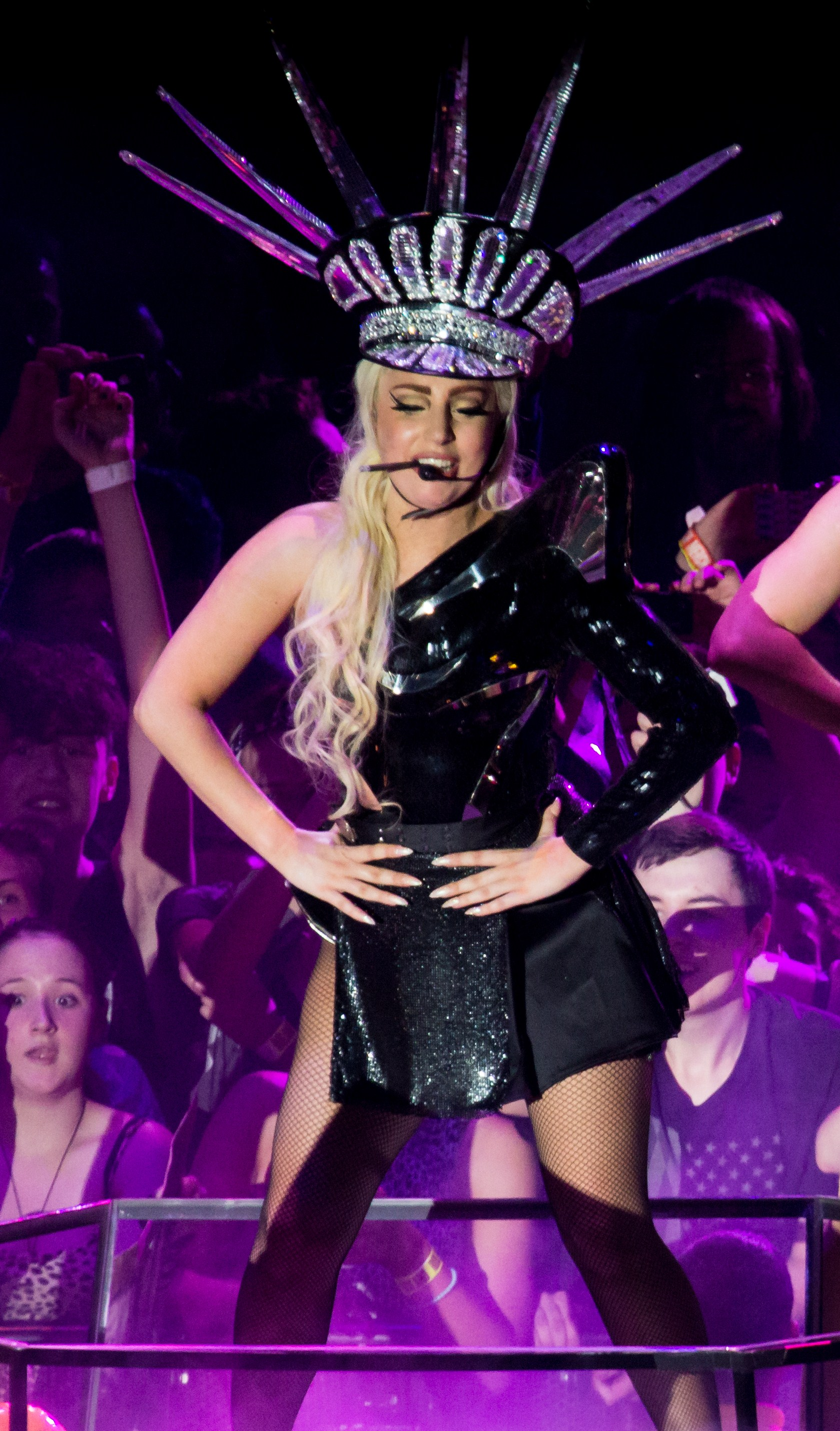
Aguilera contributes vocals to the remix of Lady Gaga's single "Do What U Want"

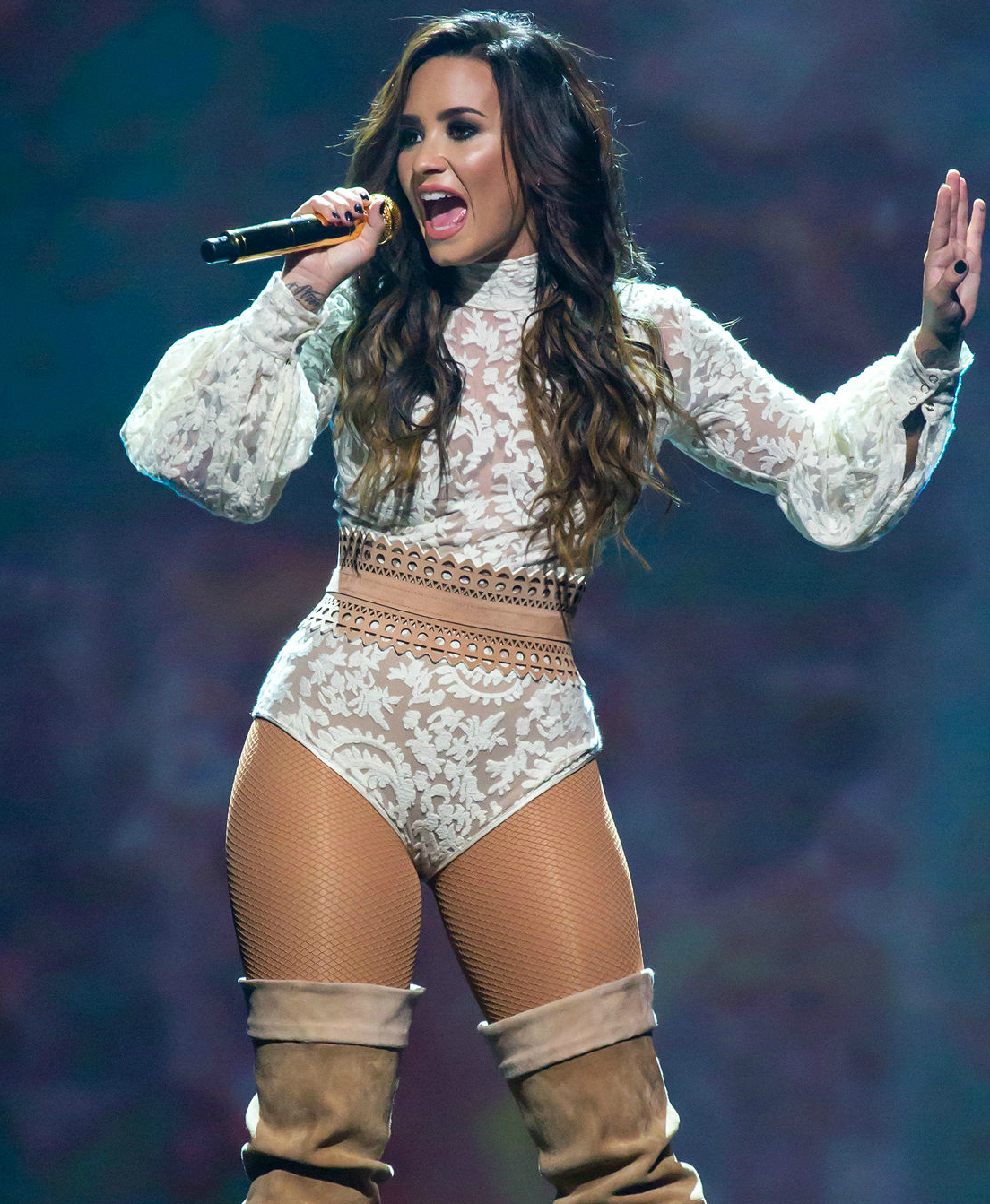
Demi Lovato features on the song "Fall in Line"

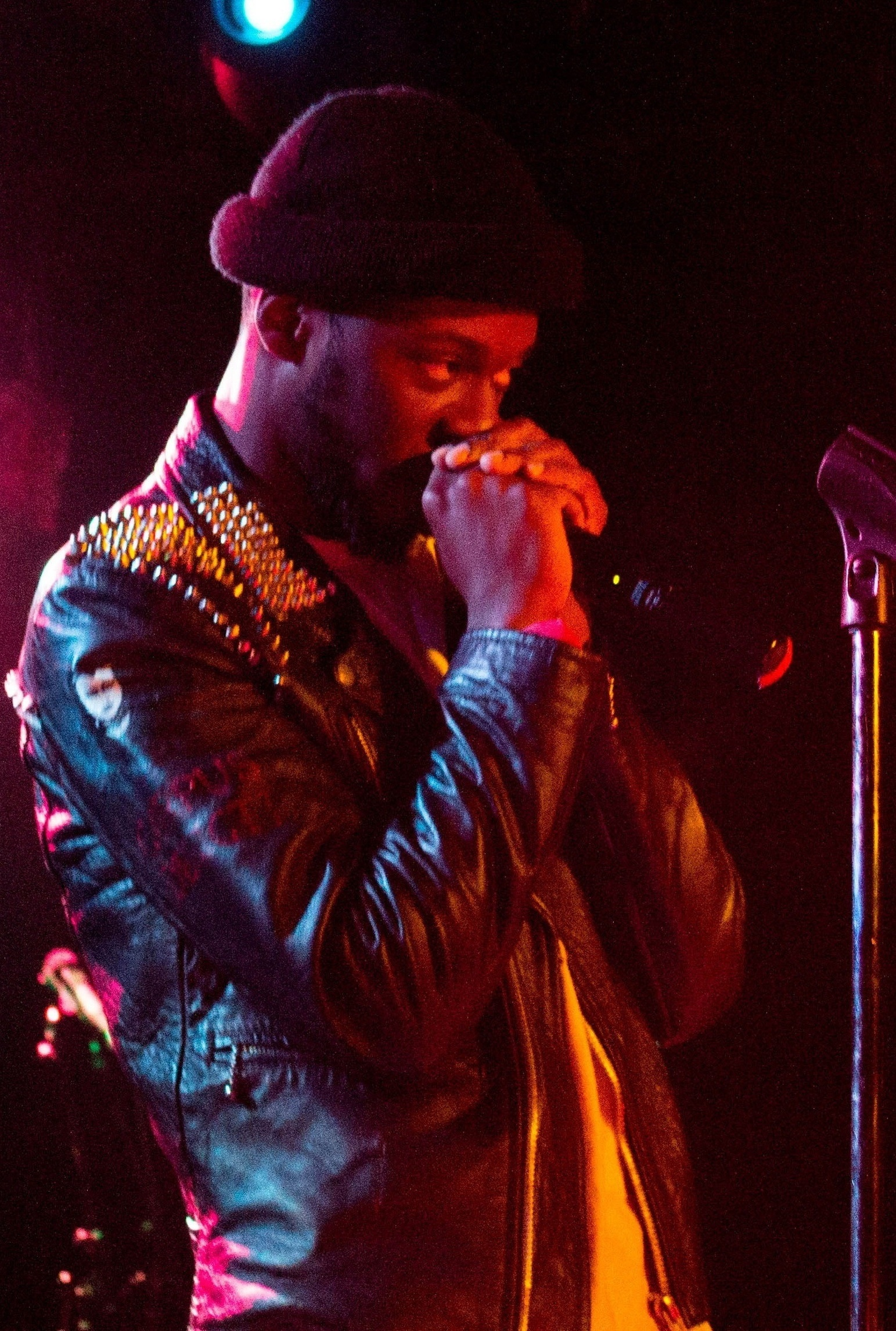
"Like I Do" from the album Liberation features GoldLink

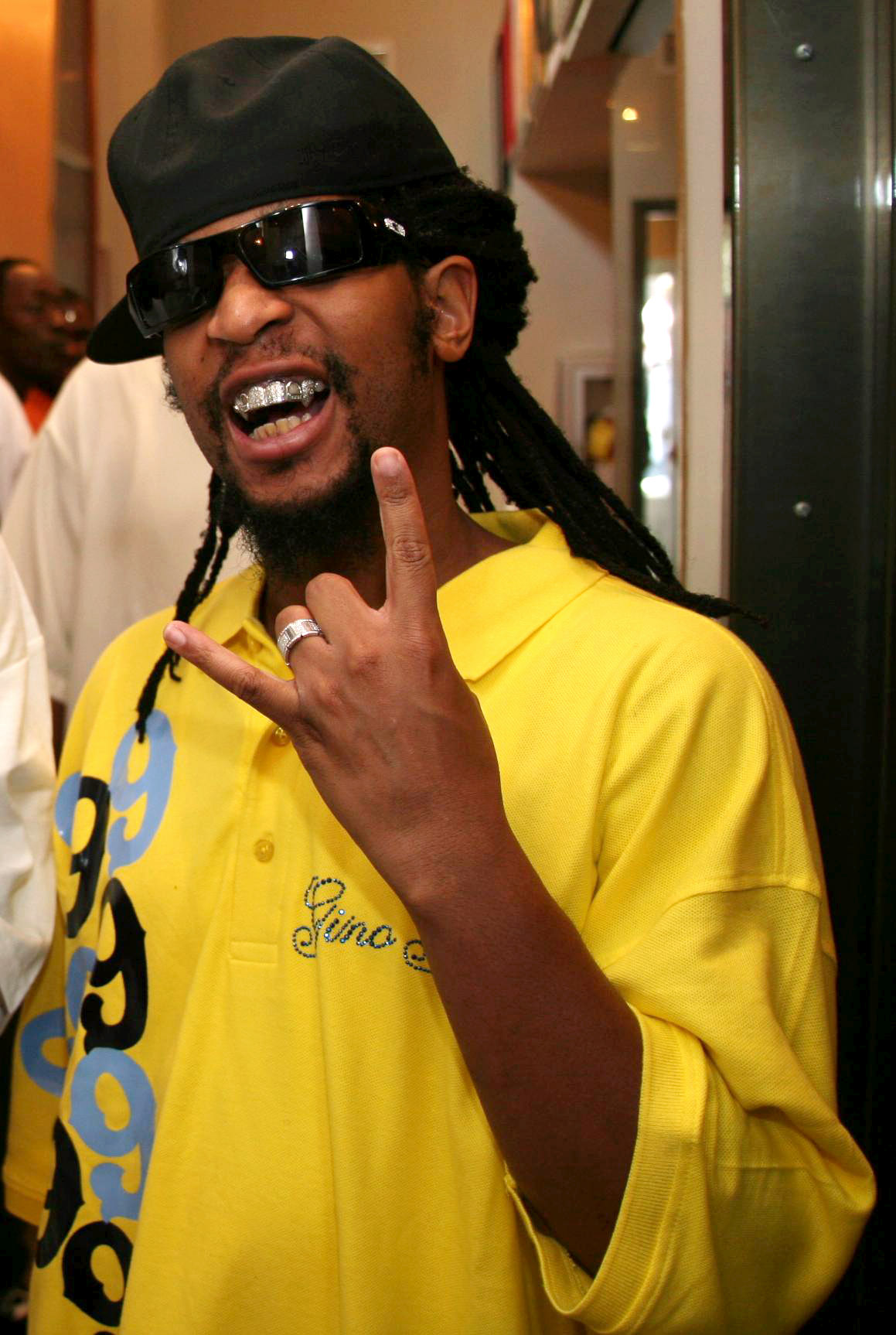
Lil Jon's background vocals are heard on Aguilera's 2010 song "Prima Donna"

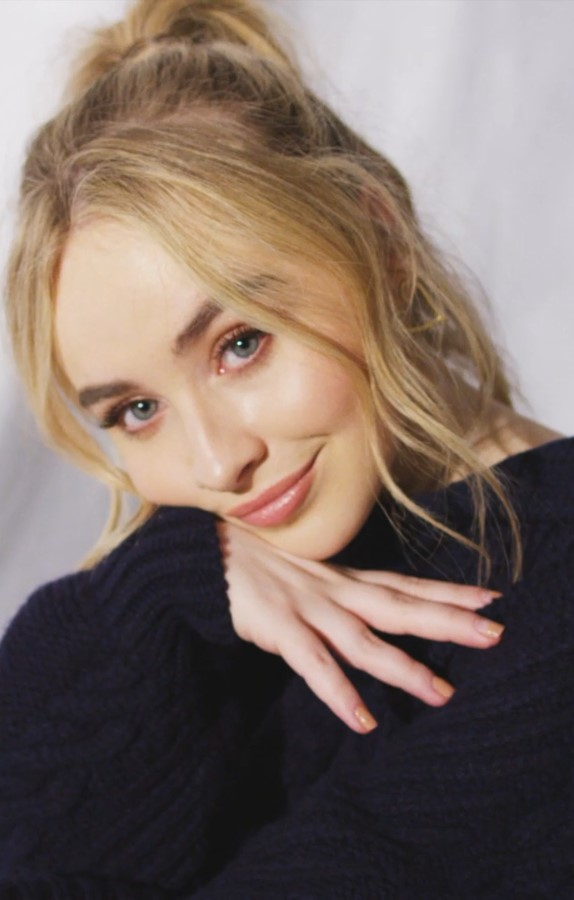
Sabrina Carpenter is featured on a 2024 reworked version of Aguilera's song "What a Girl Wants"

Title	Artist(s)	Writer(s)	Album	Year	Ref
"Accelerate" †	Christina Aguilera featuring Ty Dolla $ign and 2 Chainz	Christina Aguilera; Kanye West; Michael Dean; Christopher Pope; Ernest Brown; Carlton Mays, Jr. Badrilla Bourelly; Ilsey Juber; Jonathan Park; Tyrone Griffin, Jr. Tauheed Epps; Kirby Dockery	Liberation	2018	
"The Addams Family (Theme)"	Christina Aguilera	Vic Mizzy	The Addams Family 2 (Original Motion Picture Soundtrack)	2021	
"Ain't No Other Man" †	Christina Aguilera	Christina Aguilera; Chris E. Martin; Kara DioGuardi; Charles Martin Roane; Harold Beatty	Back to Basics	2006	
"All I Need"	Christina Aguilera	Christina Aguilera; Samuel Dixon; Sia Furler	Bionic	2010	
"All I Wanna Do"	Keizo Nakanishi featuring Christina Aguilera	Morry Stearns	Spinning	1997	
"America"	Christina Aguilera	Christina Aguilera; Linda Perry	Served Like a Girl (Music from and Inspired by the Documentary Film)	2017	
"Angels We Have Heard on High"	Christina Aguilera featuring Eric Dawkins	—N/a	My Kind of Christmas	2000	
"Anywhere But Here"	Christina Aguilera	—N/a	Finding Neverland: The Album	2015	
"Army of Me"	Christina Aguilera	Christina Aguilera; David Glass; Jamie Hartman; Phil Bentley	Lotus	2012	
"Around the World"	Christina Aguilera	Ali Tamposi; Candace Thorbourne; Christina Aguilera; Dwayne Chin-Quee; Jason Gilbert; Nailah Thorbourne; Nyanda Thorbourne; Tasha Thorbourne	Lotus	2012	
"Ave Maria" (Live from the Eiffel Tower)	Christina Aguilera & Yseult	Franz Schubert	Christmas in Paris	2025	
"Baby, It's Cold Outside"	Cee Lo Green featuring Christina Aguilera	Frank Loesser	Cee Lo's Magic Moment	2012	
"Back in the Day"	Christina Aguilera	Christina Aguilera; Chris E. Martin; Kara DioGuardi; Don Costa; Jimmy Castor; Langdon Fridle, Jr. Douglas Gibson; Harry Jensen; Robert Manigault; Gerald Thomas	Back to Basics	2006	
"Back To Basics (Intro)"	Christina Aguilera	Christina Aguilera; Chris E. Martin; Kara DioGuardi; Roy Hawkins; Rick Darnell	Back to Basics	2006	
"The Beautiful People (from Burlesque)"	Christina Aguilera	Ester Dean; Twiggy Ramirez; Larry Summerville Jr. Laura Pergolizzi; Marilyn Manson; Melvin Watson; Nicole Scherzinger; Ron Fair; Stefanie Ridel; Tommy Lee James	Burlesque	2010	
"Beautiful" †	Christina Aguilera	Linda Perry	Stripped	2002	
"Believe Me"	Christina Aguilera	Bob Allecca; Michael Brown; Christina Aguilera	Just Be Free	2001	
"Best of Me"	Christina Aguilera	Alex da Kid; Christina Aguilera; Candice Pillay; Jayson Dezuzio	Lotus	2012	
"Bionic"	Christina Aguilera	Christina Aguilera; Dave Taylor; John Hill; Kalenna Harper	Bionic	2010	
"Birds of Prey"	Christina Aguilera	Cathy Dennis; Christina Aguilera; Daniel Hunt; Helen Marnie; Mira Aroyo; Reuben Wu	Bionic ‡	2010	
"Blank Page"	Christina Aguilera	Christina Aguilera; Chris Braide; Sia Furler	Lotus	2012	
"Blessed"	Christina Aguilera	Travon Potts; Brock Walsh	Christina Aguilera	1999	
"The Blower's Daughter"	Chris Mann featuring Christina Aguilera	Damien Rice	Roads	2012	
"Bobblehead"	Christina Aguilera	Christina Aguilera; Dave Taylor; John Hill; Santi White	Bionic ‡	2010	
"Bound to You"	Christina Aguilera	Christina Aguilera; Samuel Dixon; Sia Furler	Burlesque	2010	
"Brujería"	Christina Aguilera	Christina Aguilera; Gale; Feid; Miguel Andrés Martinez Perea; Pablo Preciado; Federico Vindver; Rafa Arcaute	Aguilera	2022	
"By Your Side"	Christina Aguilera	Bob Allecca; Michael Brown; Christina Aguilera	Just Be Free	2001	
"Can't Hold Us Down" †	Christina Aguilera featuring Lil' Kim	Christina Aguilera; Scott Storch; Matt Morris	Stripped	2002	
"Candyman" †	Christina Aguilera	Christina Aguilera; Linda Perry	Back to Basics	2006	
"Car Wash" †	Christina Aguilera featuring Missy Elliott	Norman Whitfield; Missy Elliott	Shark Tale	2004	
"Casa de Mi Padre"	Christina Aguilera	Andrew Steele; Patrick C. Pérez	Casa de Mi Padre	2012	
"Castle Walls"	T.I. featuring Christina Aguilera	Alexander Grant; Clifford Harris; Holly Hafferman	No Mercy	2010	
"Cease Fire"	Christina Aguilera	Alex da Kid; Christina Aguilera; Candice Pillay	Lotus	2012	
"Change" †	Christina Aguilera	Who Is Fancy; Florian Reutter	—N/a	2016	
"The Christmas Song (Chestnut Roasting on an Open Fire)"	Christina Aguilera	Mel Tormé; Robert Wells	My Kind of Christmas	2000	
"The Christmas Song" (Live from the Eiffel Tower)	Christina Aguilera	Mel Tormé; Robert Wells	Christmas in Paris	2025	
"Christmas Time"	Christina Aguilera	Chaka Blackmon; Steven Brown; Ray Cham; Alex Alessandroni; Ron Fair	My Kind of Christmas	2000	
"Circles"	Christina Aguilera	Alex da Kid; Candice Pillay; Christina Aguilera; Dwayne Abernathy	Lotus	2012	
"Come on Over Baby (All I Want is You)" †	Christina Aguilera	Paul Rein; Johan Aberg	Christina Aguilera	1999	
"Come on Over" (Spotify Anniversaries Version)	Christina Aguilera	Chaka Blackmon; Christina Aguilera; Eric Dawkins; Guy Roche; Johan Åberg; Paul Rein; Ray Cham; Ron Fair; Shelly Peiken	The 25th Anniversary of Christina Aguilera (Spotify Anniversaries Live)	2024	
"Como Yo"	Christina Aguilera	Christina Aguilera; Federico Vindver; Gino the Ghost; Juan Morelli; Kat Dahlia; Rafa Arcaute; Tobias Wincorn	Aguilera	2022	
"Contigo en la Distancia"	Christina Aguilera	César Portillo de la Luz	Mi Reflejo	2000	
"Cruz"	Christina Aguilera	Christina Aguilera; Linda Perry	Stripped	2002	
"Cuando Me Dé la Gana" (Solo)	Christina Aguilera	Christina Aguilera; Kat Dahlia; Yoel Henríquez; Jorge Luis Chacín; Yasmil Marrufo; Rafa Arcaute; Federico Vindver	Aguilera	2022	
"Cuando Me Dé la Gana" (Duet)	Christina Aguilera featuring Christian Nodal	Christina Aguilera; Kat Dahlia; Yoel Henríquez; Jorge Luis Chacín; Yasmil Marrufo; Rafa Arcaute; Federico Vindver	Aguilera	2022	
"Cuando No es Contigo"	Christina Aguilera	Rudy Pérez; Manuel Lopez	Mi Reflejo	2000	
"Dame Lo Que Yo Te Doy"	Christina Aguilera	Christina Aguilera; Balewa; Muhammad; Steve Morales; Rudy Perez; Dave Sigel	Stripped	2002	
"Deserve"	Christina Aguilera	Uzoechi Emenike; Julia Michaels	Liberation	2018	
"Desnudate"	Christina Aguilera	Christina Aguilera; Christopher Stewart; Claude Kelly	Bionic	2010	
"Did Somebody Say HipOpera"	Latto featuring Christina Aguilera	Ben Smith; Jordan Crisp; Toni Robinson; Adam Smyth	—N/a	2023	
"Dirrty" †	Christina Aguilera featuring Redman	Christina Aguilera; Dana Stinson; Balewa Muhammad; Reginald Noble; Jasper Cameron	Stripped	2002	
"Do What U Want"	Lady Gaga featuring Christina Aguilera	Lady Gaga; Paul "DJ White Shadow" Blair; Martin Bresso; William Grigahcine; R. Kelly	—N/a	2014	
"Don't Make Me Love You"	Christina Aguilera	Shelly Peiken	Christina Aguilera ‡ (Note: "Don't Make Me Love You" also appears on The Next Best Thing soundtrack (2000), titled "Don't Make Me Love You ('Til I'm Ready)".)	1999	
"Dream a Dream"	Christina Aguilera	Bob Allecca; Michael Brown; Christina Aguilera	Just Be Free	2001	
"Dreamers"	Christina Aguilera	—N/a	Liberation	2018	
"Dreamy Eyes"	Christina Aguilera	Todd Chapman; Silena Morrell; Shelly Peiken	—N/a (Note: "Dreamy Eyes" was included on the promo CD of Christina Aguilera in 1999. However, it never appeared on any official release of the album.)	1999	
"Dynamite"	Christina Aguilera	Christina Aguilera; Linda Perry	Keeps Gettin' Better: A Decade of Hits	2008	
"El Beso del Final"	Christina Aguilera	Rudy Pérez; Franne Golde; Tom Snow	Mi Reflejo	2000	
"El Mejor Guerrero" (Note: "El Mejor Guerrero" is the Spanish-language version of "Loyal Brave True".) †	Christina Aguilera	Billy Crabtree; Harry Gregson-Williams; Jamie Hartman; Rosi Golan	Mulan (Original Motion Picture Soundtrack)	2020	
"El Último Adiós (The Last Goodbye)" †	Various Artists	Gian Marco; Emílio Estefan Jr. Jodi Marr	—N/a	2001	
"Elastic Love"	Christina Aguilera	Christina Aguilera; Dave Taylor; John Hill; Mathangi Arulpragasam	Bionic	2010	
"Empty Words"	Christina Aguilera	Ali Tamposi; Busbee; Christina Aguilera; Nikki Flores	Lotus ‡	2012	
"Enter the Circus"	Christina Aguilera	Christina Aguilera; Linda Perry	Back to Basics	2006	
"Express" †	Christina Aguilera	Christina Aguilera; Christopher Stewart; Claude Kelly	Burlesque	2010	
"Express / Santa Baby" (Live from the Crazy Horse)	Christina Aguilera	Christina Aguilera; Christopher Stewart; Claude Kelly; Joan Javits; Phil "Tony" Springer	Christmas in Paris	2025	
"F.U.S.S."	Christina Aguilera	Christina Aguilera; Martin Roane; Kara DioGuardi	Back to Basics	2006	
"Fall in Line" †	Christina Aguilera featuring Demi Lovato	Christina Aguilera; Audra Mae; Jonathan Bellion; Jonathan Simpson; Mark Williams; Raul Cubina	Liberation	2018	
"Fall on Me" †	A Great Big World & Christina Aguilera	Ian Axel; Chad Vaccarino	Particles	2019	
"Falling in Love Again (Can't Help It)"	Christina Aguilera	Sammy Lerner	The Spirit	2008	
"Falsas Esperanzas" †	Christina Aguilera	Jorge Luis Piloto	Mi Reflejo	2000	
"Feel This Moment" †	Pitbull featuring Christina Aguilera	Nasri Atweh; Chantal Kreviazuk; Adam Messinger; Sir Nolan; Armando Pérez; Christina Aguilera; DJ Buddha; Morten Harket; Paul Waaktaar-Savoy; Magne Furuholmen	Global Warming	2012	
"Fighter" †	Christina Aguilera	Christina Aguilera; Scott Storch	Stripped	2002	
"Genie 2.0" (Note: "Genie 2.0" is the remake of "Genie in a Bottle".)	Christina Aguilera	David Frank; Pamela Sheyne; Steve Kipner	Keeps Gettin' Better: A Decade of Hits	2008	
"Genie in a Bottle" †	Christina Aguilera	Steve Kipner; David Frank; Pamela Sheyne	Christina Aguilera	1999	
"Genie in a Bottle" (Live from the Crazy Horse)	Christina Aguilera	Steve Kipner; David Frank; Pamela Sheyne	Christmas in Paris	2025	
"Genie in a Bottle" (Spotify Anniversaries Version)	Christina Aguilera featuring Machine Gun Kelly	Steve Kipner; David Frank; Pamela Sheyne	The 25th Anniversary of Christina Aguilera (Spotify Anniversaries Live)	2024	
"Genio Atrapado" (Note: "Genie Atrapado" is the Spanish-language version of "Genie in a Bottle".)	Christina Aguilera	Rudy Pérez; David Frank; Steve Kipner	Mi Reflejo	2000	
"Get Mine, Get Yours"	Christina Aguilera	Christina Aguilera; Steve Morales; Balewa Muhammad; David Siegel	Stripped	2002	
"Glam"	Christina Aguilera	Christina Aguilera; Christopher Stewart; Claude Kelly	Bionic	2010	
"Guy What Takes His Time"	Christina Aguilera	Ralph Rainger	Burlesque	2010	
"Haunted Heart" †	Christina Aguilera	Antonina Armato; Christina Aguilera; Tim James	The Addams Family (Original Motion Picture Soundtrack)	2019	
"Hello (Follow Your Own Star)"	Christina Aguilera	Christina Aguilera; Heather Holley; Rob Hoffman	—N/a	2004	
"Here to Stay"	Christina Aguilera	Christina Aguilera; Heather Holley; Tony Reyes; Ben H. Allen; George Henry Jackson	Back to Basics	2006	
"Have Yourself a Merry Little Christmas"	Christina Aguilera	Ralph Blane; Hugh Martin	My Kind of Christmas	2000	
"Have Yourself a Merry Little Christmas" (Live from the Eiffel Tower)	Christina Aguilera	Ralph Blane; Hugh Martin	Christmas in Paris	2025	
"Hoy Tengo Ganas de Ti" †	Alejandro Fernández featuring Christina Aguilera	Miguel Gallardo	Confidencias	2013	
"Hurt" †	Christina Aguilera	Christina Aguilera; Linda Perry; Mark Ronson	Back to Basics	2006	
"I Am"	Christina Aguilera	Christina Aguilera; Samuel Dixon; Sia Furler	Bionic	2010	
"I Am (Stripped)"	Christina Aguilera	Christina Aguilera; Samuel Dixon; Sia Furler	Bionic ‡	2010	
"I Am a Good Girl"	Christina Aguilera	Alain Bernardini; Jacques Morali; Steven Antin	Burlesque	2010	
"I Got Trouble"	Christina Aguilera	Christina Aguilera; Linda Perry	Back to Basics	2006	
"I Come Undone"	Christina Aguilera	Rob Hoffman; Heather Holley	—N/a	1998	
"I Don't Need it Anymore (Interlude)"	Christina Aguilera	Christina Aguilera	Liberation	2018	
"Intro (La Luz)"	Christina Aguilera	Christina Aguilera	Aguilera	2022	
"I Hate Boys" †	Christina Aguilera	Bill Wellings; Christina Aguilera; Ester Dean; J.J. Hunter; Jamal Jones; William Tyler	Bionic	2010	
"I Turn to You" †	Christina Aguilera	Diane Warren	Christina Aguilera	1999	
"I Turn to You" (Spotify Anniversaries Version)	Christina Aguilera	Diane Warren	The 25th Anniversary of Christina Aguilera (Spotify Anniversaries Live)	2024	
"I Will Be"	Christina Aguilera	Christina Aguilera; Rob Hoffman; Heather Holley	Stripped – 20th Anniversary Edition	2002	
"I'm OK"	Christina Aguilera	Christina Aguilera; Linda Perry	Stripped	2002	
"Impossible"	Christina Aguilera	Alicia Keys	Stripped	2002	
"Infatuation"	Christina Aguilera	Christina Aguilera; Scott Storch; Matt Morris	Stripped	2002	
"Just a Fool" †	Christina Aguilera with Blake Shelton	Claude Kelly; Steve Robson; Wayne Hector	Lotus	2012	
"Just Be Free"	Christina Aguilera	Bob Allecca; Michael Brown; Christina Aguilera	Just Be Free	2001	
"Keep on Singin' My Song"	Christina Aguilera	Christina Aguilera; Scott Storch	Stripped	2002	
"Keeps Gettin' Better" †	Christina Aguilera	Christina Aguilera; Linda Perry	Keeps Gettin' Better: A Decade of Hits	2008	
"La Reina"	Christina Aguilera	Christina Aguilera; Luigi Castillo; Santiago Castillo; Servando Primera; Yasmil Marrufo	Aguilera	2022	
"Lady Marmalade" †	Christina Aguilera, Lil' Kim, Mýa & P!nk	Bob Crewe; Kenny Nolan	Moulin Rouge!	2001	
"Lady Marmalade" (Live from the Crazy Horse)	Christina Aguilera	Bob Crewe; Kenny Nolan	Christmas in Paris	2025	
"Learning to Fly"	Christina Aguilera	Christina Aguilera; Jeremy Silver Abraham	PAW Patrol: The Mighty Movie (Music from the Motion Picture)	2023	
"Let It Snow" (Live from the Eiffel Tower)	Christina Aguilera	Jule Styne; Sammy Cahn	Christmas in Paris	2025	
"Let There Be Love"	Christina Aguilera	Bonnie McKee; Jakke Erixson; Max Martin; Oliver Goldstein; Oscar Holter; Savan Kotecha; Shellback	Lotus	2012	
"Liberation"	Christina Aguilera	Nicholas Britell	Liberation	2018	
"Lift Me Up"	Christina Aguilera	Linda Perry	Bionic	2010	
"Light Up the Sky"	Christina Aguilera	Alex da Kid; Christina Aguilera; Candice Pillay	Lotus ‡	2012	
"Like a Virgin/Hollywood Medley"	Madonna featuring Christina Aguilera, Missy Elliott and Britney Spears	Mirwais Ahmadzaï; Tom Kelly; Madonna Ciccone; Billy Steinberg	Remixed and Revisited	2003	
"Like I Do" †	Christina Aguilera featuring GoldLink	Christina Aguilera; Jonathan Park; D'Anthony Carlos; Sang Hyeon Lee; Taylor Parks; Brandon Anderson; Whitney Phillips	Liberation	2018	
"Little Dreamer"	Christina Aguilera	Cathy Dennis; Christina Aguilera; Daniel Hunt; Reuben Wu	Bionic ‡	2010	
"Little Drummer Girl" (Live from the Eiffel Tower)	Christina Aguilera & Sheila E.	Harry Simeone; Katherine Kennicott Davis; Henry Onorati	Christmas in Paris	2025	
"Live with Me"	The Rolling Stones with Christina Aguilera	Jagger–Richards	Shine a Light	2008	
"Lotus Intro"	Christina Aguilera	Alex da Kid; Candice Pillay; Christina Aguilera; Dwayne Abernathy	Lotus	2012	
"Love & Glamour (Intro)"	Christina Aguilera	Christina Aguilera; Christopher Stewart; Claude Kelly	Bionic	2010	
"Love Embrace (Interlude)"	Christina Aguilera	—N/a	Stripped	2002	
"Love for All Seasons"	Christina Aguilera	Carl Sturken; Evan Rogers	Christina Aguilera	1999	
"Love Will Find a Way"	Christina Aguilera	Carl Sturken; Evan Rogers	Christina Aguilera	1999	
"Loving Me 4 Me"	Christina Aguilera	Christina Aguilera; Scott Storch; Matt Morris	Stripped	2002	
"Loyal Brave True" †	Christina Aguilera	Billy Crabtree; Harry Gregson-Williams; Jamie Hartman; Rosi Golan	Mulan (Original Motion Picture Soundtrack)	2020	
"Make Me Happy"	Christina Aguilera	LaForest Cope; Michael Brown	Just Be Free	2001	
"Make Over"	Christina Aguilera	Christina Aguilera; Linda Perry	Stripped	2002	
"Make the World Move"	Christina Aguilera featuring Cee Lo Green	Alex da Kid; Armando Trovajoli; Candice Pillay; Dwayne Abernathy; Jayson DeZuzio; Mike Del Rio	Lotus	2012	
"Makes Me Wanna Pray"	Christina Aguilera featuring Steve Winwood	Christina Aguilera; Kara DioGuardi; Rich Harrison; Steve Winwood	Back to Basics	2006	
"Maria"	Christina Aguilera	Christina Aguilera; Kanye West; Ross Birchard; Ilsey Juber; Jahron Brathwaite; Tayla Parx; Che Pope; Noah Goldstein; Lawrence Brown; Linda Glover; Horgay Gordy; Allen Story	Liberation	2018	
"Masochist"	Christina Aguilera	Christina Aguilera; Tim Anderson; Darhyl Camper Jr. Ilsey Juber	Liberation	2018	
"Mercy on Me"	Christina Aguilera	Christina Aguilera; Linda Perry	Back to Basics	2006	
"Merry Christmas, Baby"	Christina Aguilera featuring Dr. John	Lou Baxter; Johnny Moore	My Kind of Christmas	2000	
"Mi Reflejo" (Note: "Mi Reflejo" is the Spanish-language version of "Reflection".)	Christina Aguilera	Rudy Pérez; Matthew Wilder; David Zippel	Mi Reflejo	2000	
"Monday Morning"	Christina Aguilera	Christina Aguilera; Dave Taylor; John Hill; Sam Endicott; Santi White	Bionic ‡	2010	
"Morning Dessert (Intro)"	Christina Aguilera	Bernard Edwards, Jr.	Bionic	2010	
"Mother"	Christina Aguilera featuring Bigelf	John Lennon	Instant Karma: The Amnesty International Campaign to Save Darfur	2007	
"Move It"	Christina Aguilera	Bob Allecca; Michael Brown; Christina Aguilera	Just Be Free	2001	
"Moves like Jagger" †	Maroon 5 featuring Christina Aguilera	Adam Levine; Benny Blanco; Ammar Malik Shellback	Hands All Over	2011	
"My Favorite Things" (Live from the Eiffel Tower)	Christina Aguilera	Oscar Hammerstein II Richard Rodgers	Christmas in Paris	2025	
"My Girls"	Christina Aguilera featuring Peaches	Christina Aguilera; Kathleen Hanna; JD Samson; Johanna Fateman; Merrill Beth Nisker	Bionic	2010	
"My Heart (Intro)"	Christina Aguilera	Christina Aguilera	Bionic	2010	
"Nasty Naughty Boy"	Christina Aguilera	Christina Aguilera; Linda Perry	Back to Basics	2006	
"Nobody Wants to Be Lonely" †	Ricky Martin featuring Christina Aguilera	Desmond Child; Victoria Shaw; Gary Burr	Sound Loaded	2000	
"No Es Que Te Extrañe" †	Christina Aguilera	Christina Aguilera; Edgar Barrera; Federico Vindver; Pablo Preciado; Rafa Arcaute; Yasmil Marrufo	Aguilera	2022	
"Not Myself Tonight" †	Christina Aguilera	Ester Dean; Greg Curtis; Jamal Jones; Jason Perry	Bionic	2010	
"Obvious"	Christina Aguilera	Heather Holley	Christina Aguilera	1999	
"Obvious" (Spotify Anniversaries Version)	Christina Aguilera	Heather Holley	The 25th Anniversary of Christina Aguilera (Spotify Anniversaries Live)	2024	
"Oh Holy Night"	Christina Aguilera	Adolphe Adam	My Kind of Christmas	2000	
"O Holy Night" (Live from the Eiffel Tower)	Christina Aguilera	Adolphe Adam; Placide Cappeau; John Sullivan Dwight	Christmas in Paris	2025	
"Oh Mother" †	Christina Aguilera	Christina Aguilera; Derryck Thornton; Mark Rankin; Liz Thornton; Kara DioGuardi; Bruno Coulais; Christophe Barratier	Back to Basics	2006	
"On Our Way"	Christina Aguilera	Christina Aguilera; Derryck Thornton; Mark Rankin; Liz Thornton; Kara DioGuardi	Back to Basics	2006	
"Our Day Will Come"	Christina Aguilera	Bob Hilliard; Mort Garson	Just Be Free	2001	
"Pa Mis Muchachas" †	Christina Aguilera, Becky G & Nicki Nicole featuring Nathy Peluso	Christina Aguilera; Kat Dahlia; Yasmil Marrufo; Jorge Luis Chacín; Yoel Henríquez; Nathy Peluso; Nicki Nicole; Becky G	Aguilera	2021	
"Pero Me Acuerdo de Ti" †	Christina Aguilera	Rudy Pérez	Mi Reflejo	2000	
"Pipe"	Christina Aguilera featuring XNDA	Christina Aguilera; Kai Wright; Sean Seaton; Che Pope; Rene Hill; XNDA	Liberation	2018	
"Por Siempre Tú" (Note: "Por Siempre Tú" is the Spanish-language version of "I Turn to You".)	Christina Aguilera	Rudy Pérez; Diane Warren	Mi Reflejo	2000	
"Prima Donna"	Christina Aguilera	Christina Aguilera; Christopher Stewart; Claude Kelly	Bionic	2010	
"Primer Amor (Interlude)"	Christina Aguilera	—N/a	Stripped	2002	
"The Real Thing"	Christina Aguilera	Audra Mae; Jackie Tohn	—N/a	2015	
"Red Hot Kinda Love"	Christina Aguilera	Christina Aguilera; Lucas Secon; Olivia Waithe	Lotus	2012	
"Reflection" †	Christina Aguilera	Matthew Wilder; David Zippel	Mulan: An Original Walt Disney Records Soundtrack (Note: "Reflection" also appears on Christina Aguilera (1999).)	1998	
"Reflection (2020)" †	Christina Aguilera	Matthew Wilder; David Zippel	Mulan (Original Motion Picture Soundtrack)	2020	
"Reflection" (Spotify Anniversaries Version)	Christina Aguilera	Matthew Wilder; David Zippel	The 25th Anniversary of Christina Aguilera (Spotify Anniversaries Live)	2024	
"The Right Man"	Christina Aguilera	Christina Aguilera; Linda Perry	Back to Basics	2006	
"Right Moves"	Christina Aguilera featuring Keida and Shenseea	Christina Aguilera; Marcos Palacios; Bryan Nelson; Julia Michaels; Justin Tranter; Tayla Parx; Makeida Beckford; Chinsea Lee	Liberation	2018	
"Rockin' Around the Christmas Tree" (Live from the Eiffel Tower)	Christina Aguilera	Johnny Marks	Christmas in Paris	2025	
"Running out of Time"	Christina Aguilera	Bob Allecca; Michael Brown; Christina Aguilera	Just Be Free	2001	
"Santo" †	Christina Aguilera featuring Ozuna	Christina Aguilera; Dallas James Koehlke; Gale; Josh Barrios; Ozuna	Aguilera	2022	
"Save Me from Myself"	Christina Aguilera	Christina Aguilera; Linda Perry; Bill Bottrell	Back to Basics	2006	
"Say Something" †	A Great Big World & Christina Aguilera	Ian Axel; Chad Vaccarino	Is There Anybody Out There?	2013	
"Se Libre" (Note: "Se Libre" is the Spanish version of "Just Be Free")	Christina Aguilera	Bob Allecca; Michael Brown; Christina Aguilera	Just Be Free	2001	
"Searching for Maria"	Christina Aguilera	Richard Rodgers; Oscar Hammerstein II	Liberation	2018	
"Sex for Breakfast"	Christina Aguilera	Bernard Edwards, Jr. Christina Aguilera; Noel Fisher	Bionic	2010	
"Show Me How You Burlesque" †	Christina Aguilera	Christina Aguilera; Christopher Stewart; Claude Kelly	Burlesque	2010	
"Shotgun"	Christina Aguilera	Christina Aguilera; Sean McConnell; Audra Mae	—N/a	2015	
"Shut Up"	Christina Aguilera	Alex da Kid; Candice Pillay; Christina Aguilera; Dwayne Abernathy; Mike Del Rio; Nate Campany	Lotus ‡	2012	
"Si No Te Hubiera Conocido"	Christina Aguilera featuring Luis Fonsi	Rudy Pérez	Mi Reflejo	2000	
"Sick of Sittin'"	Christina Aguilera	Christina Aguilera; Brandon P. Anderson; Melvin Henderson; Whitney Phillips; Janne Schaffer	Liberation	2018	
"Silent Night / Noche de Paz"	Christina Aguilera	Franz Xaver Gruber; Joseph Mohr	Platinum Christmas	2000	
"Sing for Me"	Christina Aguilera	Aeon "Step" Manahan; Christina Aguilera; Ginny Blackmore	Lotus	2012	
"Slow Down Baby" †	Christina Aguilera	Christina Aguilera; Mark Ronson; Kara DioGuardi; Raymond Angry; William Guest; Merald Knight; Edward Patten; Gladys Knight; Marvin Bernard; Michael Harper; Curtis Jackson	Back to Basics	2006	
"So Emotional"	Christina Aguilera	Franne Golde; Tom Snow	Christina Aguilera	1999	
"Soar"	Christina Aguilera	Christina Aguilera; Rob Hoffman; Heather Holley	Stripped	2002	
"Somebody's Somebody"	Christina Aguilera	Diane Warren	Christina Aguilera	1999	
"Someday at Christmas" (Live from the Eiffel Tower)	Christina Aguilera	Ron Miller Bryan Wells	Christmas in Paris	2025	
"Something's Got a Hold on Me"	Christina Aguilera	Etta James; Leroy Kirkland; Pearl Woods	Burlesque	2010	
"Somos Nada" †	Christina Aguilera	Christina Aguilera; Federico Vindver; Mario Domm; Sharlene Taule	Aguilera	2021	
"Somos Novios (It's Impossible)"	Andrea Bocelli featuring Christina Aguilera	Armando Manzanero	Amore	2006	
"A Song for You"	Herbie Hancock featuring Christina Aguilera	Leon Russell	Possibilities	2005	
"Steppin' Out with My Baby"	Tony Bennett featuring Christina Aguilera	Irving Berlin	Viva Duets	2012	
"Still Dirrty"	Christina Aguilera	Christina Aguilera; Chris E. Martin; Kara DioGuardi	Back to Basics	2006	
"Stripped (Intro)"	Christina Aguilera	Heather Holley; Rob Hoffman	Stripped	2002	
"Stripped Pt. 2"	Christina Aguilera	Heather Holley; Rob Hoffman	Stripped	2002	
"Stronger Than Ever"	Christina Aguilera	Christina Aguilera; Samuel Dixon; Sia Furler	Bionic ‡	2010	
"Suéltame"	Christina Aguilera & Tini	Christina Aguilera; Martina Stoessel; Andrés Torres; Federico Vindver; Mauricio Rengifo; Rafael Arcaute; Kat Dahlia	Aguilera	2022	
"Telepathy" †	Christina Aguilera featuring Nile Rodgers	Sia Furler; Mikkel Storleer Eriksen; Tor Erik Hermansen	The Get Down (Original Soundtrack from the Netflix Original Series)	2016	
"Tell Me" †	Diddy featuring Christina Aguilera	Sean Combs; Stephen Garrett; Shannon Jones; Jack Knight; Shannon Lawrence; Ryan Montgomery; Leroy Watson	Press Play	2006	
"Te Deseo Lo Mejor"	Christina Aguilera	Édgar Barrera; Luis Barrera Jr. Juan Diego Linares; Christina Aguilera; Elena Rose; Rafa Arcaute; Federico Vindver	Aguilera	2022	
"Thank You (Dedication to Fans...)"	Christina Aguilera	Christina Aguilera; Chris E. Martin; Kara DioGuardi; Pamela Sheyne; David Frank; Steve Kipner	Back to Basics	2006	
"That's What Love Can Do"	Christina Aguilera	Christina Aguilera; Glen Ballard	Justin & Christina	2003	
"These Are the Special Times"	Christina Aguilera	Diane Warren	My Kind of Christmas	2000	
"This Christmas"	Christina Aguilera	Donny Hathaway; Nadine McKinnor	My Kind of Christmas	2000	
"This Year"	Christina Aguilera	Lauren Christy; Graham Edwards; Scott Spock; Charlie Midnight; Christina Aguilera	My Kind of Christmas	2000	
"Tilt Ya Head Back" †	Nelly featuring Christina Aguilera	Nelly; Dorian Moore; Tegemold Newton; Curtis Mayfield	Sweat	2004	
"Too Beautiful for Words"	Christina Aguilera	Shelly Peiken; Todd Chapman	—N/a (Note: Released as a B-side on Aguilera's single "What a Girl Wants".)	1999	
"Traguito"	Christina Aguilera	Christina Aguilera; Rafael Rodríguez; Daniel Rondón; Andy Clay; Rafa Arcaute; Federico Vindver; Kat Dahlia	Aguilera	2022	
"Twice" †	Christina Aguilera	Kirby Dockery	Liberation	2018	
"Una Mujer" (Note: "Una Mujer" is the Spanish-language version of "What a Girl Wants".)	Christina Aguilera	Rudy Pérez; Guy Roche; Shelly Peiken	Mi Reflejo	2000	
"Underappreciated"	Christina Aguilera	Christina Aguilera; Scott Storch; Matt Morris	Stripped	2002	
"Understand"	Christina Aguilera	Christina Aguilera; Kara DioGuardi; Kwamé Holland; Allen Toussaint	Back to Basics	2006	
"Unless It's With You"	Christina Aguilera	Christina Aguilera; Eric Frederic; John Theodore Geiger; Kaj Hassle; Gamal Lewis; Thomas Peyton	Liberation	2018	
"Vanity"	Christina Aguilera	Christina Aguilera; Claude Kelly; Ester Dean	Bionic	2010	
"Ven Conmigo (Solamente Tú)" (Note: "Ven Conmigo (Solamente Tú)" is the Spanish-language version of "Come on Over Baby (All I Want is You)".) †	Christina Aguilera	Rudy Pérez; Johan Aberg; Paul Rein	Mi Reflejo	2000	
"The Voice Within" †	Christina Aguilera	Christina Aguilera; Glen Ballard	Stripped	2002	
"Walk Away"	Christina Aguilera	Christina Aguilera; Scott Storch; Matt Morris	Stripped	2002	
"The Way You Talk To Me"	Christina Aguilera	Bob Allecca; Michael Brown; Christina Aguilera	Just Be Free	2001	
"We Remain" †	Christina Aguilera	Ryan Tedder; Brent Kutzle; Mikky Ekko	The Hunger Games: Catching Fire	2013	
"We're a Miracle"	Christina Aguilera	Christina Aguilera; Todd Jerome Chapman; David Zippel	Pokémon: The First Movie (Note: "We're a Miracle" was also included on the Japanese edition of Christina Aguilera in 1999.)	1999	
"Welcome"	Christina Aguilera	Christina Aguilera; Linda Perry; Mark Ronson; Paul III	Back to Basics	2006	
"What a Girl Wants" †	Christina Aguilera	Shelly Peiken; Guy Roche	Christina Aguilera	1999	
"What a Girl Wants" (Spotify Anniversaries Version)	Christina Aguilera featuring Sabrina Carpenter	Shelly Peiken; Guy Roche	The 25th Anniversary of Christina Aguilera (Spotify Anniversaries Live)	2024	
"What Are You Doing New Year's Eve?" (Live from the Eiffel Tower)	Christina Aguilera	Frank Loesser	Christmas in Paris	2025	
"What's Going On" †	Artists Against AIDS Worldwide	Al Cleveland; Renaldo Benson; Marvin Gaye	What's Going On	2001	
"When You Put Your Hands on Me"	Christina Aguilera	Robin Thicke; James Gass	Christina Aguilera	1999	
"Without You"	Christina Aguilera	Christina Aguilera; Kara DioGuardi; Mark Ronson; Rob Lewis	Back to Basics	2006	
"Woohoo" †	Christina Aguilera featuring Nicki Minaj	Christina Aguilera; Claude Kelly; Ester Dean; Onika Maraj; Jamal Jones	Bionic	2010	
"Xtina's Xmas (Interlude)"	Christina Aguilera	—N/a	My Kind of Christmas	2000	
"Ya Llegué"	Christina Aguilera	Christina Aguilera; Jon Leone; Juan Morelli; Kat Dahlia	Aguilera	2022	
"You Are What You Are (Beautiful)" (Note: "You Are What You Are (Beautiful)" is the remake of "Beautiful".)	Christina Aguilera	Linda Perry	Keeps Gettin' Better: A Decade of Hits	2008	
"You Lost Me" †	Christina Aguilera	Christina Aguilera; Samuel Dixon; Sia Furler	Bionic	2010	
"Your Body" †	Christina Aguilera	Max Martin; Savan Kotecha; Shellback; Tiffany Amber	Lotus	2012	

== Unreleased songs ==
Title	Year	Artist(s)	Writer(s)	Notes
"All My Children"	—N/a	Christina Aguilera	Christina Aguilera; Jasper Cameron; Balewa Muhammad; Reginald Noble; Dana Stinson	Unreleased but registered with Broadcast Music Incorporated (BMI)
"At Last"	—N/a	Christina Aguilera	Harry Warren; Mack Gordon	A cover of a song originally recorded by Glenn Miller and his Orchestra (1941), and later popularized by Etta James (1960); Unreleased but registered with American Society of Composers, Authors and Publishers (ASCAP)
"Badass"	—N/a	Christina Aguilera	Matt Darey	Unreleased but registered with American Society of Composers, Authors and Publishers (ASCAP)
"Beauty Queen"	—N/a	Christina Aguilera	Linda Perry; Daniel Powter	Unreleased but registered with Broadcast Music Incorporated (BMI)
"Before You"	—N/a	Christina Aguilera	Christina Aguilera; Matt Morris; Dorris Luckey Moore	Unreleased but registered with Broadcast Music Incorporated (BMI)
"Behind Every Man There's a Strong Woman"	—N/a	Christina Aguilera	Christina Aguilera; Linda Perry	Unreleased but registered with Broadcast Music Incorporated (BMI)
"Climb Ev'ry Mountain"	2000	Christina Aguilera	Oscar Hammerstein II; Richard Rodgers	A cover of the song from the 1959 musical The Sound of Music; Failed to be included on My Kind of Christmas (2000)
"Confessions of a Broken Heart"	—N/a	Christina Aguilera	Christina Aguilera; Linda Perry	Unreleased but registered with Broadcast Music Incorporated (BMI)
"Definition"	—N/a	Christina Aguilera	—N/a	Leaked in December 2025
"Dolores"	—N/a	Christina Aguilera featuring C. Tangana	—N/a	Failed to be included on Aguilera (2022)
"Dolores"	—N/a	Christina Aguilera featuring Marc Anthony	—N/a	Failed to be included on Aguilera (2022)
"Easier to Lie"	2012	Christina Aguilera	Max Martin; Shellback; Savan Kotecha	Reportedly recorded for Aguilera's seventh studio album Lotus (2012)
"Find Myself Again"	—N/a	Christina Aguilera	Christina Aguilera; Matt Morris; Dorris Luckey Moore	Unreleased but registered with Broadcast Music Incorporated (BMI)
"Fly Away"	—N/a	Christina Aguilera	Damond Nichols	Unreleased but registered with American Society of Composers, Authors and Publishers (ASCAP)
"Fuck You, Suck You"	c. 2006	Christina Aguilera	—N/a	Recorded during a studio session with producer Linda Perry circa 2006
"Hold Me One Last Time"	—N/a	Christina Aguilera	Christina Aguilera; Matt Morris; Dorris Luckey Moore	Unreleased but registered with Broadcast Music Incorporated (BMI)
"Home"	—N/a	Christina Aguilera	Christina Aguilera; Shelly Peiken; Guy Roche	Unreleased but registered with Broadcast Music Incorporated (BMI)
"I Am Not Alone"	—N/a	Christina Aguilera	—N/a	Registered by Mediabase in 2012
"I Know You Are Listening"	—N/a	Christina Aguilera	Christina Aguilera; Matt Morris; Dorris Luckey Moore	Unreleased but registered with Broadcast Music Incorporated (BMI)
"I Only Know How to Love"	—N/a	Christina Aguilera	—N/a	Recorded for the 2011 NBC Wonder Woman pilot episode which was not picked up for a series
"I'm Not Playing Caiaphas"	—N/a	Christina Aguilera	Christina Aguilera; Scott Storch	Unreleased but registered with Broadcast Music Incorporated (BMI)
"Jump In"	—N/a	Christina Aguilera	Christina Aguilera; Shelly Peiken; Guy Roche	Unreleased but registered with Broadcast Music Incorporated (BMI)
"Kimono Girl"	2010	Christina Aguilera	Cathy Dennis; Christina Aguilera; Daniel Hunt; Helen Marnie; Mira Aroyo; Reuben Wu	Failed to be included on Bionic (2010); Unreleased but registered with Broadcast Music Incorporated (BMI)
"Let It Go"	—N/a	Christina Aguilera	Christina Aguilera; Dayyon Alexander Drinkard; Jeffrey Shum	Unreleased but registered with American Society of Composers, Authors and Publishers (ASCAP)
"Listen Up"	2010	Christina Aguilera	Christina Aguilera; Claude Kelly	Failed to be included on Bionic (2010)
"Lloras Por Na’"	—N/a	Christina Aguilera featuring C. Tangana	—N/a	Failed to be included on Aguilera (2022)
"Lolita"	2017	Christina Aguilera	Christina Aguilera; Jarina De Marco; Tayla Parx	Unfinished demo recorded in 2017
"Mad About You"	—N/a	Christina Aguilera	Johan Carlsson; Ross Golan	Unreleased but registered with American Society of Composers, Authors and Publishers (ASCAP)
"Mirror"	—N/a	Christina Aguilera	Christina Aguilera; Matt Morris; Dorris Luckey Moore	Unreleased but registered with Broadcast Music Incorporated (BMI)
"Miss Independent"	2003	Kelly Clarkson	Christina Aguilera; Kelly Clarkson; Rhett Lawrence; Matt Morris	Failed to be included on Stripped (2002); Given to Kelly Clarkson
"My Delirium"	2009	Christina Aguilera	Pip Brown; Pascal Gabriel; Alex Gray; Hannah Robinson	Unreleased cover of a song by New Zealand singer-songwriter Ladyhawke; Ladytron revealed that they had recorded a version of "My Delirium" with Aguilera
"My So-Called Life"	—N/a	Christina Aguilera	Linda Perry	Unreleased but registered with American Society of Composers, Authors and Publishers (ASCAP)
"Name and Likeness"	—N/a	Christina Aguilera	—N/a	Unreleased but registered with American Society of Composers, Authors and Publishers (ASCAP)
"Nasty"	2010	Christina Aguilera featuring CeeLo Green	Thomas Callaway; Harry Casey; Richard Finch; Claude Kelly; Billy Nichols; Jack Splash; James Brown	Failed to appear on the soundtrack to the film Burlesque (2010), which co-stars Aguilera and Cher; Re-recorded and released by Pixie Lott for her self-titled studio album in 2013
"Ready for You"	—N/a	Christina Aguilera	Christopher Michael McFadden	Unreleased but registered with Broadcast Music Incorporated (BMI)
"Rhode Ideas"	—N/a	Christina Aguilera	Christina Aguilera; Scott Storch	Recorded for Stripped (2002)
"Search the World"	—N/a	Christina Aguilera	Pharrell Williams	Recorded for Liberation (2018)
"Segura"	2023	Christina Aguilera	Christina Aguilera; Gino Borri (Gino the Ghost); Juan Morelli; Katarina Sandra Huguet; Luis Federico Vindver Arosa; Rafael Ignacio Arcaute; Sol Was	Registered on SESAC
"So What You Got"	2010	Christina Aguilera	Christina Aguilera; Dr Luke; Cathy Dennis	Failed to be included on Bionic (2010); Unreleased but registered with Broadcast Music Incorporated (BMI)
"Tan Emocional"	2001	Christina Aguilera	Franne Golde; Tom Snow	Spanish version of "So Emotional" from Christina Aguilera (1999); Failed to be included on Mi Reflejo (2000)
"Under Her Spell"	c. 2002	Christina Aguilera	Christina Aguilera; Matt Morris	Unreleased but registered with Broadcast Music Incorporated (BMI)
"Waves"	—N/a	Christina Aguilera	David Hodges; Meghan Kabir; Margaret Elizabeth Chapman	Unreleased but registered with APRA and BMI
"Wonderland"	c. 2018	Christina Aguilera	Christina Aguilera; Audra Mae; Robert T. Gerongco; Samuel T. Gerongco	Unreleased but registered with Broadcast Music Incorporated (BMI); It was first previewed during the Liberation Tour in September 2018

== See also ==
- Christina Aguilera discography
