= Christmas Time =

Christmas Time, Christmas time or Christmastime may refer to:

- Christmastide
- The Christmas and holiday season

== Music ==
- Christmas Time (Boney M. album), 2008
- Christmas Time (Marcos Witt album), 2005
- Christmas Time (Wendy Moten album), 1995
- "Christmas Time" (Bryan Adams song), 1985
- "Christmas Time" (Backstreet Boys song), a 1996 song by the Backstreet Boys
- "Christmas Time", a song by Christina Aguilera from the album My Kind of Christmas
- "Christmas Time", a song by ALO from the album This Warm December, 2008
- "Christmas Time", a song by Ray Charles from the album The Spirit of Christmas
- "Christmas Time (Don't Let the Bells End)", a 2003 single by The Darkness
- "Christmas Time (Is Here Again)", a 1967 song by The Beatles
- "Christmastime", a song by Aimee Mann from the album One More Drifter in the Snow
- "Christmastime", a song by The Smashing Pumpkins from the album A Very Special Christmas 3
- "Christmastime", a song by Stevie Wonder from the album Someday at Christmas
- Christmastime (Bob Schneider album), 2009
- Christmastime (Michael W. Smith album), 1998
- Christmastime (The Swingle Singers album), 1968
- Christmastime!, a 2004 album by Don McLean

== See also ==
- Advent
- Christmas season (disambiguation)
- The Christmas Island Time zone (UTC+07:00)
