= Christmas Again =

"Christmas Again" may refer to:

== Film and television ==
- Christmas, Again, a 2014 romantic drama film by Charles Poekel
- "Christmas, Again" (Starstruck), a 2022 episode of the 2021 British comedy series Starstruck
- Christmas...Again?!, a 2021 Disney Channel Original Movie by Andy Fickman
- Christmas Is Here Again, a 2007 American animated Christmas musical-comedy-fantasy-adventure film by Robert Zappia

== Music ==
- Christmas Time Again, the eleventh studio album by American Southern rock band Lynyrd Skynyrd.
- It's Christmas Again, album by the American jazz drummer Max Roach recorded in 1984.

== See also ==
- Christmas Time Is Here Again (disambiguation)
