= Christmas Time Is Here Again =

"Christmas Time Is Here Again" may refer to:

- Christmas Time Is Here Again!, a 1967 Christmas album by The Beatles
  - "Christmas Time (Is Here Again)", a song from the album
- "Christmas Time Is Here Again", a 1968 song by The Flirtations
- "Christmas Time Is Here Again" (The Beach Boys song), a 1998 adaptation of Buddy Holly's 1957 song "Peggy Sue" by the Beach Boys, on the 1998 album Ultimate Christmas

== See also ==
- Christmas Time (disambiguation)
- "Christmas Time Is Here", a 1965 single by Vince Guaraldi written for A Charlie Brown Christmas
- Christmas Time Again, a 2000 album by Lynyrd Skynyrd
