= Christmas in Paris =

Christina Aguilera: Christmas in Paris
- Directed by: Sam Wrench
- Produced by: Sam Wrench; Becki Powers
- Starring: Christina Aguilera
- Cinematography: James Rhodes
- Music by: Christina Aguilera; Rob Lewis
- Production company: Next Of Kin Content
- Distributed by: Roc Nation; Vertigo Live; Fathom Entertainment
- Release date: December 14, 2025 (United States)
- Running time: 85 minutes
- Country: United States
- Language: English
- Box office: $137,444

Christina Aguilera: Christmas in Paris is a 2025 Christmas special and a documentary-concert film performed by American singer Christina Aguilera and directed by Sam Wrench. The film was released theatrically on December 14 and 22, 2025, and was a celebration for the twenty fifth anniversary of Aguilera's Christmas album, My Kind of Christmas (2000). It later aired on CBS on December 22 while simultaneously being sent to streaming.

Filmed at multiple locations in Paris, France, Aguilera performed various Christmas songs alongside three songs of her own. The performances were released as a live album titled Christmas in Paris on December 14, 2025 by Three Wishes and 5020 Records.

== Background and release ==
In September 2024, Aguilera celebrated the twenty fifth anniversary of her self-titled debut studio album and partnered with Spotify to release an episode of their "Anniversaries" series. A year later, in October 2025, Deadline Hollywood reported that Aguilera had filmed a theatrical concert film that month, which she would release to celebrate the twenty fifth anniversary of her third studio album and first Christmas album, My Kind of Christmas (2000). They reported that the special would be directed by British director Sam Wrench known for his work with Taylor Swift: The Eras Tour, and released in partnership with Roc Nation, Vertigo Live, and Fathom Entertainment. Tickets went on sale on November 7, with a trailer for the film released a day later featuring clips of Aguilera performing Holiday covers of the songs "My Favorite Things" from The Sound of Music, and Stevie Wonder's "Someday at Christmas".

The film was released theatrically on December 14 and 21. The Hollywood Reporter reported that during the film's two-weekend theatrical run in the United States, the film grossed a total of $137,444 domestically. A shortened version of the special excluding the non-Christmas performances at the cabaret nightclub Crazy Horse aired later on CBS on December 22, 2025 and was made available to stream on Paramount+.

== Content ==
The special opened with Aguilera performing the Christmas song "Have Yourself a Merry Little Christmas" atop the Eiffel Tower. Aguilera explained during an interview on The Jennifer Hudson Show that despite the fact that she is afraid of heights, the experience "paid off" and described it as a "magical" moment. She went on to perform other Christmas songs in front of the tower in a winter garden terrace above the Musée du Quai Branly, while having additionally performed "a few of her biggest hits" at the cabaret nightclub, Crazy Horse.

The film was intercut with "dreamlike Parisian interludes", showcasing Aguilera contemplating "love, motherhood, reinvention, and her artistry". Aguilera was joined by guests American drummer Sheila E. and French singer Yseult on the songs "Little Drummer Girl" and "Ave Maria" respectively.

== Live album ==
Christmas in Paris

Live album by Christina Aguilera
- Released: December 14, 2025
- Recorded: October 10, 2025
- Venues: Eiffel Tower, Musée du Quai Branly and Crazy Horse, Paris
- Length: 47:24
- Labels: Three Wishes; 5020
- Producers: Christina Aguilera; Rob Lewis

Christina Aguilera chronology
The 25th Anniversary of Christina Aguilera (Spotify Anniversaries Live) (2024)	Christmas in Paris (2025)

Christmas in Paris is a live album by American singer Christina Aguilera. It was released on December 14, 2025, by Three Wishes and 5020 Records. It is also Aguilera's second Christmas-themed album following her third studio album My Kind of Christmas (2000). The 13-track album consisted of Christmas standards and three non-Christmas tracks. Aguilera's covers of "My Favorite Things" and "Someday at Christmas" were released on streaming prior to the film's release.

=== Commercial performance ===
The album peaked at number 33 on the UK Album Downloads Chart, spending two weeks in the top seventy-five.

=== Track listing ===
Christmas in Paris track listing
No.	Title	Writer(s)	Length
1.	"Have Yourself a Merry Little Christmas"	Hugh Martin; Ralph Blane	4:02
2.	"O Holy Night"	Traditional	3:52
3.	"My Favorite Things"	Richard Rodgers; Oscar Hammerstein II	3:03
4.	"Someday at Christmas"	Ron Miller; Bryan Wells	4:10
5.	"Little Drummer Girl" (with Sheila E.)	Harry Simeone; Katherine Kennicott Davis; Henry Onorati	3:29
6.	"Express (Santa Baby)"	Aguilera; C. "Tricky" Stewart; Claude Kelly; Joan Javits; Phil "Tony" Springer	2:28
7.	"Genie in a Bottle"	David Frank; Steve Kipner; Pamela Sheyne	4:44
8.	"Lady Marmalade"	Bob Crewe; Kenny Nolan	4:39
9.	"The Christmas Song"	Mel Tormé; Robert Wells	3:27
10.	"Rockin' Around the Christmas Tree"	Johnny Marks	2:20
11.	"Ave Maria" (with Yseult)	Franz Schubert	4:45
12.	"What Are You Doing New Year's Eve"	Frank Loesser	4:05
13.	"Let It Snow"	Jule Styne; Sammy Cahn	2:20
Total length:			47:24

Notes

- All tracks were produced by Aguilera and Rob Lewis.
- On streaming services, all tracks are subtitled "Live from the Eiffel Tower", save tracks 6, 7 and 8 which are subtitled "Live from the Crazy Horse".
