= The 25th Anniversary of Christina Aguilera (Spotify Anniversaries Live) =

EP by Christina Aguilera
- Released: September 23, 2024
- Recorded: 2024
- Venue: Mateo Studios (Los Angeles, California)
- Length: 17:09
- Label: Three Wishes; 5020
- Producer: Christopher Hartz

Christina Aguilera chronology
Aguilera (2022)	The 25th Anniversary of Christina Aguilera (Spotify Anniversaries Live) (2024)	Christmas in Paris (2025)

The 25th Anniversary of Christina Aguilera (Spotify Anniversaries Live) (Note: Alternatively titled The 25th Anniversary of Christina Aguilera Live on streaming platforms other than Spotify.) is an extended play by American singer Christina Aguilera. It was released on September 23, 2024, through 5020 Records and Aguilera's Three Wishes production company. Created to mark the twenty fifth anniversary of her self-titled debut album, the project features live studio re-imaginings of several of Aguilera's signature tracks.

The EP was released as part of Spotify's Anniversaries series and as a live recording on YouTube. It saw musical collaborations with Sabrina Carpenter and Machine Gun Kelly, as well as appearances from Aguilera's early collaborators Ron Fair and Heather Holley.

== Background and release ==
In August 2024, Aguilera noted in an interview with Glamour that she was "grateful" when discussing the upcoming twenty fifth anniversary of her debut studio album, teasing new music. On September 17, Aguilera announced on social media that she would be releasing a live studio re-imagining of her debut album for an episode of "Spotify Anniversaries". A trailer was also released which showed Aguilera in a "tiny gold tracksuit that looked like a bedazzled gold disco ball".

Head of Spotify Music Studios Sarah Patellos explained that the Anniversaries project would be a "celebration not only of the [songs], but also the growth of each artist as they revisit their classics". The project would include "new interpretations of iconic tracks, along with previously untold stories about the original recording process and the impact these works have had on the artists' careers". Speaking to Rolling Stone, Aguilera noted that she has "always enjoyed reimagining my songs with different styles and audiences, as well as playing with sounds and arrangements that showcase how all music can be timeless", adding that she wanted to celebrate the album in a way that "brings together the past and present".

The performances were released as an extended play (EP) on Spotify as well as a live recording on YouTube on September 23, 2024. Alongside the performances, Aguilera also had sit down conversations with her mentor Ron Fair and collaborator Heather Holley who were described as "key figures in the development of her career". The EP was later released on Apple Music on November 21, 2024.

== Musical content ==
The EP saw Aguilera performing stripped down versions of her songs starting with "Come on Over Baby (All I Want Is You)". This was followed by "Genie in a Bottle" which saw American rapper Machine Gun Kelly accompanying her with a guitar solo. She performed "Obvious" and "I Turn to You" with Heather Holley playing the piano for the former having originally composed it.

Aguilera then performed a duet with American singer Sabrina Carpenter on the song "What a Girl Wants". Before performing, Carpenter noted that as a child she watched Aguilera song and cited it as the "most inspiring thing to me ever to see, as a young girl who wanted to sing". Aguilera ended the EP with a performance of her debut solo single, "Reflection" from the Disney animated film Mulan (1998). She noted that the song was one of the few songs that "still resonates with her", adding that "people love that song so much because it’s about not being seen and that’s been a part of my career, so much [...] trying to find yourself and listen to the inner you".

== Promotion ==
On November 15, 2024, Aguilera appeared on Carpenter's Short n' Sweet Tour where the two performed Aguilera's 2006 song "Ain't No Other Man" and their duet version of "What a Girl Wants".

== Reception ==
In December 2024, the EP was named one of the best albums of 2024 by HuffPost. Writer Erin Evans opined that it was the "best sing-along compilation of the year". In 2025, it was nominated for two Webby Awards, including in the "Music – General Video & Film" category, and for Aguilera's duet of "What a Girl Wants" with Carpenter.

=== Accolades ===
Publication	List	Rank	Ref.
HuffPost	Best Albums of 2024	—N/a	

Year	Ceremony	Category	Recipient	Result	Ref.
2025	Webby Awards	Music – General Video & Film	—N/a	Nominated	
2025	Webby Awards	Best Individual Performance	"What a Girl Wants" with Sabrina Carpenter	Nominated	

== Track listing ==
Track listing
No.	Title	Writer(s)	Length
1.	"Come on Over"	Chaka Blackmon; Christina Aguilera; Eric Dawkins; Guy Roche; Johan Äberg; Paul Rein; Ray Cham; Ron Fair; Shelly Peiken	2:04
2.	"Genie in a Bottle" (featuring Machine Gun Kelly)	David Martin Frank; Pamela Sheyne; Stephen Kipler	2:37
3.	"Obvious"	Heather Holley	3:12
4.	"I Turn To You"	Diane Warren	2:42
5.	"What a Girl Wants" (featuring Sabrina Carpenter)	Roche; Peiken	3:55
6.	"Reflection"	David Zippel; Matthew Wilder	2:39
Total length:			17:09

Notes

- All tracks are produced by Christopher Hartz.
- All tracks are subtitled "(Live – Spotify Anniversary Version)" on Spotify; other streaming platforms omit "Spotify".
