= Christmas season (disambiguation) =

Christmas season usually refers to the Christmas and holiday season, a seasonal celebration period surrounding Christmas and other holidays.

Christmas season may also refer to:

- Christmastide, the part of the Christian liturgical year that runs from Christmas Day until either the feast of the Epiphany or the feast of the Baptism of the Lord
- Epiphanytide, the part of the liturgical year in certain denominations that runs from the feast of the Epiphany to Candlemas, which marks the end of the Christmas season
- Economics of Christmas, the financial impact of the peak selling season for retailers in many nations around the world.
