= Just Be Free =

Demo album by Christina Aguilera
- Released: August 21, 2001
- Recorded: 1994–1995
- Genres: Dance-pop; R&B
- Length: 45:59
- Label: Warlock
- Producers: Bobby Allecca; Michael Brown

Christina Aguilera chronology
My Kind of Christmas (2000)	Just Be Free (2001)	Stripped (2002)

Singles from Just Be Free
- 1. "Just Be Free" Released: 2001

Just Be Free is a demo album by American singer Christina Aguilera released on August 21, 2001, by Warlock Records. After finishing her run on The All New Mickey Mouse Club, a then fifteen-year-old Aguilera began recording the album with New Jersey–based producers Robert Allecca and Michael Brown. The pair gave Aguilera the opportunity to use a recording studio and presented her with demo music.

Just Be Free consists of dance style tracks as well as ballads, and saw Aguilera performing Spanish-language songs. The record was conceived to showcase Aguilera's vocals in an effort to reach out to record labels, a venture which actually backfired after the recordings were not very well received among critics. Six years after the completion of the album and Aguilera had achieved mainstream success, Brown and Allecca released the record. Just Be Free has sold over 129,000 copies in the United States.

== Background ==
After news that The All New Mickey Mouse Club would be filming its final season, Aguilera sought out a record deal. She spent time in Philadelphia to record demo tracks with various producers, hoping to have an album released by the time she had finished high school. While taping the final season of the show, she began working with New Jersey–based producers Roberts Allecca and Michael Brown; the duo was also known as Platinum Recordings. The pair eventually built a relationship with Aguilera and her family, offering her studio time. According to biographer Pier Dominguez, they told her that the demo recordings they would produce would be their property, but also that they would never commercially release the material. She recorded eleven "rough and unfinished" tracks which then went on to become the Just Be Free studio sessions.

=== Musical style ===
"Just Be Free"
A sample of the song "Just Be Free"

The tapes were conceived as a way of introducing Aguilera to the music industry and were described as an attempt to build interest in her musical abilities among record labels. During the recording sessions, Aguilera experimented with different languages, recording songs such as the title track "Just Be Free" in Spanish. Musically, the album generally consists of dance tracks and ballads, the latter of which were created in an effort to showcase Aguilera's vocal talents. Nearly all of the songs on the album were co-written by Aguilera with Bob Allecca and Michael Brown. Pier Dominguez, author of A Star Is Made said: "Christina's songwriting proved to be an early sign of the intense artistic involvement that the singer would have in every single endeavor she decided to embark on during her career. She was already showing, at fourteen, that she was first and foremost a talented musician and artist."

== Lawsuit and release ==
In May 2001, Just Be Free became available for online pre-order with a tentative release date of June 19, under Warlock Records. Carla Christofferson, her lawyer at the time, explained that Aguilera had been unaware of the album's planned release until she discovered it herself online, and Aguilera soon began efforts to stop the release. Aguilera filed a suit against Warlock Records and the affiliates Platinum Recordings and JFB Music for "improper use of her name and license on the upcoming album Just Be Free". Christofferson said: "We're trying to stop them from releasing these early recordings which is not the quality she is associated with right now." However, Warlock Records president Adam Levy felt that despite Aguilera disliking the material, he found it to be a look into her life at the time of recording. He stated: "It's a great look at what she was doing, We're pleased [to be putting the record out]. I'm more pleased for the album's producers who wanted to get it out. I hope the fans can appreciate it." Christofferson responded by alleging that Warlock Records tried to "boot strap" on Aguilera's success. In response to the lawsuit, Warlock Records filed their own lawsuit in an attempt to ensure the release of the record. During the proceedings, Aguilera agreed to let Warlock Records release Just Be Free after reaching a settlement with the company and its affiliates. She allowed the release under the condition that the label would have to include a letter written by Aguilera in each album released.

Just Be Free was recorded when I was 14 and 15 years old. At that young age, I made the recordings as a possible stepping stone to a career in music, which is my ultimate passion. They were made just so that I could get my foot in the door of the music business. I did not intend that the recordings would be widely released, especially after I signed with a major record label. I have not updated or finished the versions recorded in my childhood, and they are being released "as is," although I tried to prevent the release for several years. The recordings do not in any way reflect my current musical taste and where I am as an artist. The growth and vocal development I experienced as I matured into young adulthood is not reflected in the recordings. The album of new recordings that I intend to release this fall will be the album that truly reflects my artistry, my vision, and my passion. The Just Be Free recordings will hopefully be a footnote in a musical career that I dream will last for many years to come.

— Aguilera, in the album's accompanying letter

Levy said of the settlement: "Christina knows that these guys did work on this record and it was recorded and they do have rights to it - and we were sensitive to the fact that she should be able to control her name and likeness", while Christofferson said: "They were going to put it out one way or another and this way Christina got to make a statement on the album, and she's happy about that." Aguilera chose the photograph that was used on the album's cover, which depicts her at the age the album was recorded. The album has since been made available on streaming services.

== Single ==
BAM Records released Just Be Free's title track as a single in 1997; the singer was credited simply as Christina. In his Billboard review, critic Larry Flick described it as a promising effort. He noted that "she belts with a strong, throaty authority" and compared the production to music by Paula Abdul. Flick also highlighted the appeal of the Spanish-language version. In 1998, TMO Records released the song as a 7-track maxi-single. German label Biba Records Ltd. released the single in 2000, the first time she was credited on the single as 'Christina Aguilera'. In 2001, Platinum Recording Group released a promo-only single to promote the album's release.

== Reception ==
Professional ratings
Review scores
Source	Rating
AllMusic	2/5 stars
Entertainment Weekly	D
Jam!	1/5 stars
Toronto Sun	2.5/5 stars
Winnipeg Sun	0/5 stars

Just Be Free received generally negative reviews from critics. Stephen Thomas Erlewine of AllMusic understood why Aguilera was dissatisfied with the release of the material, calling the songs "pre-professional" and "generic early-'90s dance-pop". He noted that Just Be Free did not match the quality of her self-titled debut album due to its "bland" production. David Browne of Entertainment Weekly gave the album a D-rating, citing the album's production and describing the content as "teen-jailbait" due to lyrics such as "Why don't you stay with me tonight".

Pier Dominguez, author of A Star Is Made, commented that the sessions demonstrated "Christina's raw vocal agility" despite calling the content "dull", adding "Christina's hunger for success actually comes through in these songs, as she sings her heart out with strained emotion, trying to sound as if she's letting all her inhibitions run free. If she did in fact co-write the songs then they were also a demonstration of Christina's songwriting dexterity, because the album's lyrics could be called unoriginal and perhaps even cheesy, it could not be said that they were not catchy". Similarly, Stephanie McGrath from Jam! also saw why Aguilera would not want the album released. Although she recognized Aguilera's potential as a vocalist, she wrote "the songs themselves are terrible, dated club tracks, overwhelmed by poor effects and mundane beats." In a more positive review, Jane Stevenson from the Toronto Sun stated: "The combination of dance songs – actually a lot more fun than they have any right to be – and overwrought balladry is hardly a far cry from the music she's putting out today, albeit a lot less polished."

Just Be Free debuted and peaked at number 71 on the Billboard 200 and has sold over 129,000 copies in the United States.

== Track listing ==
All tracks are written by Bob Allecca, Michael Brown and Christina Aguilera, except where noted.

Just Be Free track listing
No.	Title	Length
1.	"Just Be Free"	3:43
2.	"By Your Side"	4:07
3.	"Move It" (dance mix)	3:44
4.	"Our Day Will Come" (written by Mort Garson and Bob Hilliard)	4:05
5.	"Believe Me"	4:17
6.	"Make Me Happy" (written by LaForest Cope and Michael Brown)	3:54
7.	"Dream a Dream"	4:51
8.	"Move It"	3:37
9.	"The Way You Talk to Me"	4:05
10.	"Running Out of Time"	3:55
11.	"Believe Me" (dance remix)	4:36
12.	"Just Be Free" (Spanish version)	3:41
Total length:		48:35

== Personnel ==
- Christina Aguilera – vocals, background vocals
- Bob Allecca – executive producer
- Michael Brown – executive producer
- Amy Knong – art direction and design
- Eliud "Liu" Ortiz – mixing engineer
- Greg Smith – assistant mix engineer
- Chris Gehringer – mastering engineer

== Charts ==
Chart performance for Just Be Free
Chart (2001)	Peak position
US Billboard 200	71
