= My Kind of Christmas (Christina Aguilera album) =

2000 studio album by Christina Aguilera

Studio album by Christina Aguilera
- Released: October 24, 2000
- Recorded: Late 1999–Mid 2000
- Studios: Royaltone Studios; Ocean Way Nashville; Signet Sound Studios; Metalworks Studios
- Genres: Christmas; dance-pop
- Length: 45:25
- Label: RCA
- Producers: ChakDaddy; Sol Survivor; E. Dawk; Ron Fair; The Matrix; Robbie Buchanan; "Bassy" Bob Brockmann; Barry Harris; Chris Cox

Christina Aguilera chronology
Mi Reflejo (2000)	My Kind of Christmas (2000)	Just Be Free (2001)

Singles from My Kind of Christmas
- 1. "The Christmas Song (Chestnuts Roasting on an Open Fire)" Released: November 15, 1999

My Kind of Christmas is the first Christmas and third overall studio album by American singer Christina Aguilera. It was released on October 24, 2000, by RCA Records. The album was recorded from late 1999 to mid 2000, while Aguilera was touring to promote her self-titled debut album and its follow-up Spanish-language album Mi Reflejo. My Kind of Christmas contains cover versions of Christmas standards, such as "Have Yourself a Merry Little Christmas" and "Angels We Have Heard on High", as well as several original recordings, which incorporate dance-pop elements. The album was produced by Ron Fair, the Matrix, Robbie Buchanan, Barry Harris and Chris Cox.

My Kind of Christmas received generally mixed reviews from music critics upon release, who criticized its musical style and Aguilera's oversinging. Retrospective reviews for the album have been positive with praise to the album's lasting impact. The album topped the US Top Holiday Albums chart, peaked at number 28 on the US Billboard 200 and was certified platinum by the Recording Industry Association of America (RIAA), having sold 1,015,000 copies. Aguilera appeared on several television shows, such as The Early Show and The David Letterman Show, to promote the album, and also performed a special concert for ABC, which was released on DVD in June 2001, as My Reflection.

== Background ==
Aguilera achieved success following the release of her first two studio albums, Christina Aguilera in 1999 and Mi Reflejo in late-2000 respectively, both of which were certified multi-platinum by the Recording Industry Association of America (RIAA). In 1999, Aguilera released a cover of "The Christmas Song" which found critical and commercial success peaking at number 18 on the US Billboard Hot 100 singles chart. Recording for My Kind of Christmas began from early to mid-2000, when Aguilera was touring to support her debut and Spanish-counterpart albums. A cover version of the song "Climb Ev'ry Mountain" from the 1959 musical The Sound of Music was recorded for the album but ultimately it was not included on the tracklist and remains unreleased.

== Composition ==
"The Christmas Song (Holiday Remix)"
A 25-second sample of "The Christmas Song (Holiday Remix)", a dance number which is set to "a kicking dance beat."

My Kind of Christmas is a Christmas and dance-pop album, which is made up of mainly cover versions of Christmas standards along with several new tracks. The album begins with two original songs. "Christmas Time" is a "catchy, upbeat, pop song, all about the Christmas season" and includes a rap from Aguilera towards the end. "This Year" was co-written by Aguilera and is a hip hop and R&B-infused song where "Aguilera sings about spending the holidays with her sweetheart in a typical xtina fashion".

This is followed by "Have Yourself a Merry Little Christmas", "Angels We Have Heard on High" and "Merry Christmas, Baby" which are the three soulful and gospel ballads from the album, backed by a 70-piece orchestra. Originally, Etta James was planned to be included as a featured performer on the track "Merry Christmas, Baby". However Dr. John was chosen instead. A portion of "Auld Lang Syne" is included at the beginning of "Merry Christmas, Baby" with some deeming the input to be unnecessary. Aguilera's cover of "O Holy Night" was received with mixed reviews with comparisons made to Mariah Carey's version. Aguilera recites The Lord's Prayer during the song which was called "awkward but nice". Wales Online called it one of "the absolute worst Christmas songs of all time".

"O Holy Night" is followed by Aguilera's cover of Celine Dion's "These Are the Special Times" from her album of the same name. Aguilera then covers Donny Hathaway's "This Christmas", which received praise for its originality. "The Christmas Song", previously released in late-1999 was also included in the album. This was followed by an interlude titled "Xtina's Xmas". The album ends with "The Christmas Song (Holiday Remix)" which was Aguilera's version of "The Christmas Song" remade as a dance-styled number by Thunderpuss who set the song to "a kicking dance beat".

== Promotion ==
The album was released on October 24, 2000, by RCA Records as Aguilera's third studio album in the United States, following her two first albums Christina Aguilera (1999) and Mi Reflejo (2000). It was released as two formats: CD and cassette. In order to promote the album, Aguilera promoted the album on a number of shows, including The Rosie O'Donnell Show, The Early Show, and David Letterman Show. On December 10, 2000, Aguilera performed "The Christmas Song", "Genie in a Bottle" and "What a Girl Wants" during a concert at Franklin High in Milwaukee, being watched by 1,300 students. She also performed during an ABC special concert later in December; the set list included songs from her three first studio albums, including a song from My Kind of Christmas, "Have Yourself A Little Merry Christmas". There, she performed the track with Brian McKnight. The concert was filmed and released as a DVD entitled My Reflection (2001).

A promotional live video was produced for "Christmas Time". On November 10, 2023, both a sped up and slowed version of "This Christmas" was released on streaming, through Sony Music Solutions. The song was later certified gold by IFPI Danmark for selling over 45,000 units.

=== Singles ===
Prior to the album's release, "The Christmas Song (Chestnuts Roasting on an Open Fire)" was released as a single, and sent to hot adult contemporary and adult contemporary radio stations on November 15, 1999, as well as receiving a commercial release on compact disc. It became Aguilera's fifth top-twenty hit on the Billboard Hot 100, peaking at number 18 on the chart. Aguilera's version became the second highest position for the song in the chart after the original.

== Reception ==
=== Initial reception ===
Professional ratings
Review scores
Source	Rating
AllMusic	3/5 stars
Entertainment Weekly	(C)
Rolling Stone	(negative)
The Atlanta Journal-Constitution	(mixed)
The Austin Chronicle	2/5 stars

The album initially garnered mixed reviews from music critics, who criticized the production and Aguilera's vocal delivery. AllMusic editor Stephen Thomas Erlewine wrote that "none of the new songs are knockouts" but the album was an "entertaining seasonal dance-pop" that "may not add too much to Christina's catalog" but "suggest that she may not be a mere one-album wonder." Chris Willman from Entertainment Weekly thought that "Aguilera oversings so wildly that there wouldn't have been enough oxygen in the booth to sustain another life form", and that Aguilera "is out of control here, spoiling some nifty modern arrangements with her exhausting insistence on making every other syllable an octave spanning tour de force." Jaan Uhelszki from Rolling Stone criticized the album as being "chilly, forced and overdone", and claimed that the album "is just another forum to showcase Aguilera's formidable bag of vocal gymnastics and posturing without a shred of sincerity or warmth". The Atlanta Journal-Constitution was not impressed toward Aguilera's vocal ability on the album, giving it a mixed review. The Austin Chronicle writer Christopher Gray gave the album two stars noting that "Aguilera certainly has the pipes to outlast such jejune nonsense, but she's got to learn some subtlety first, and Christmas songs aren't exactly the best material to be practicing on".

=== Retrospective reception ===
In a retrospective review, Billboard writer Taylor Weatherby noted in 2016 that "for some reason, Aguilera's album is not really one that gets circulated annually when local radio stations go into full-on Christmas mode, even despite reaching number-one on the Billboard Holiday Albums chart". In 2023, Forbes named a promotional single "Christmas Time" as one of the fifteen most iconic Christmas pop songs, adding that "as time has passed, this track reigns with its mere pop brilliance."

== Commercial performance ==
My Kind of Christmas debuted at number 38 on the Billboard 200 with first week sales of about 25,000. It reached its peak at number 28. It also peaked atop the Billboard Holiday Albums chart. The Recording Industry Association of America (RIAA) certified the album platinum for having sold more than 1,015,000 copies in the country.

== Track listing ==
My Kind of Christmas track listing
No.	Title	Writer(s)	Producer(s)	Length
1.	"Christmas Time"	Chaka Blackmon; Steven Brown; Ray Cham; Alex Alessandroni; Ron Fair	ChakDaddy; Sol Survivor; E. Dawk; Fair	4:02
2.	"This Year"	Lauren Christy; Graham Edwards; Scott Spock; Charlie Midnight; Christina Aguilera	The Matrix; Fair	4:13
3.	"Have Yourself a Merry Little Christmas"	Ralph Blane; Hugh Martin	Fair	4:03
4.	"Angels We Have Heard on High"	Traditional	ChakDaddy; Sol Survivor; E. Dawk; Fair	4:09
5.	"Merry Christmas, Baby" (featuring Dr. John)	Lou Baxter; Johnny Moore	Fair	5:43
6.	"Oh Holy Night"	Adolphe Adam	Fair	4:49
7.	"These Are the Special Times"	Diane Warren	Robbie Buchanan; Fair	4:31
8.	"This Christmas"	Donny Hathaway; Nadine McKinnor	Fair	4:02
9.	"The Christmas Song (Chestnuts Roasting on an Open Fire)"	Mel Tormé; Robert Wells	Fair	4:25
10.	"Xtina's Xmas (Interlude)"		"Bassy" Bob Brockmann	1:32
11.	"The Christmas Song (Holiday Remix)"	Tormé; Wells	Barry Harris; Chris Cox; Fair	4:01
Total length:				45:25

== Personnel ==
- Lead vocals, background vocals – Christina Aguilera, E. Dawk, Dr. John, Kim Johnson, Miari
- Keyboards – Alex Alessandroni, BabyBoy, E. Dawk, The Matrix
- Trumpet – Wayne Bergeron
- Bass guitar – Chuck Berghofer
- Saxophone – Pete Christlieb, Gene Cipriano, Dan Higgins, Sal Lozano
- Drums – Vinnie Colaiuta, Peter Erskine, Harold Jones, Harvey Mason
- Percussion – Larry Bunker, Luis Conte, Steve Forman
- Violin – Mario de Leon, Joel Derouin, Assa Drori, Kirstin Fife, Armen Garabedian, Galina Golovin, Agnes Gottschewski, Endre Granat, Lily Ho-Chen, Tiffany Ju, Joe Ketendjian, Johana Krejci, Gary Kuo, Natalie Leggett, Kathleen Lenski, Alan Mautner, Francis Moore, Katia Popov, Barbara Porter
- Guitar – John Goux, Ashley Ingram
- Piano – Dr. John, Tom Ranier, Bob Sanov, Billy Preston
- Trumpet – Warren Luening
- Organ – Myron McKinley, Billy Preston
- Producers – Ron Fair, The Matrix
- Executive producer – Ron Fair
- Engineers – Brad Haehnel, The Matrix, Michael C. Ross, Sol Survivor
- Assistant engineers – Howard Karp, Chris Wonzer
- Mixing – Peter Mokran, Dave Pensado, Michael C. Ross
- Mastering – Eddy Schreyer
- Assistants – Chad Brown, Bobby Butler, Brian Dixon, Tony Flores, Paul Forgues, David Guerrero, Michael Huff, Ed Krautner, Charles Paakkari, Howard Risson, Chris Shepherd, Jason Stasium, Bradley Yost
- Digital editing – Tal Herzberg
- Vocal recording – Michael C. Ross
- Programming – ChakDaddy, The Matrix, Sol Survivor
- Arrangers – Ron Fair, The Matrix, Don Sebesky
- String arrangements – Ron Fair
- Vocal arrangement – ChakDaddy, Eric Dawkins, Ron Fair
- Orchestration – Don Sebesky
- Art direction – Brett Kilroe
- Design – Vivian Ng
- Photography – Norman Jean Roy

== Charts ==
=== Weekly charts ===
Chart (2000–2023)	Peak position
Australian Albums (ARIA)	188
Belgian Albums (Ultratop Flanders)	179
Japanese Albums (Oricon)	78
Latvian Albums (LaIPA)	67
South African Albums (RISA)	29
South Korean International Albums (Gaon)	37
UK Budget Albums (OCC)	21
US Billboard 200	28
US Top Holiday Albums (Billboard)	1

=== Year-end charts ===
Chart (2000)	Position
South Korean International Albums (MIAK)	46
US Billboard 200	130
US Top Holiday Albums (Billboard)	2

== Certifications and sales ==
Region	Certification	Certified units/sales
South Africa (RISA)	Gold	25,000^{*}
South Korea	—	24,000
United States (RIAA)	Platinum	1,015,000
^{*} Sales figures based on certification alone.

== See also ==
- List of Billboard Top Holiday Albums number ones of the 2000s
