= Christina Aguilera discography =

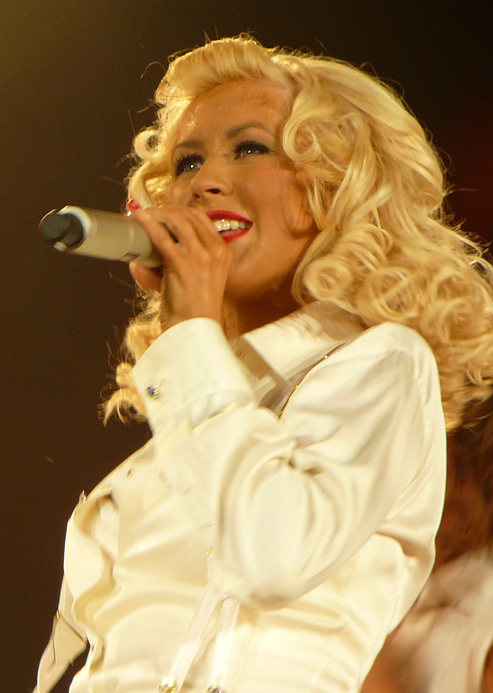
- Aguilera performing in 2006
- Studio albums: 9
- Extended plays: 5
- Soundtrack albums: 2
- Compilation albums: 4
- Singles: 54
- Promotional singles: 17

American singer Christina Aguilera has released nine studio albums, five extended plays (EPs), four compilation albums, two soundtrack albums, 54 singles (including eight as featured artist), and 17 promotional singles. After gaining recognition for her solo musical debut with "Reflection", the theme song for the Disney animated film Mulan (1998), Aguilera signed a multi-album contract with RCA Records in 1998.

She released her self-titled debut album in 1999 which debuted at number one on the US Billboard 200 gaining the singles "Genie in a Bottle", "What a Girl Wants" and "Come On Over Baby (All I Want Is You)" which all topped the US Billboard Hot 100. "Genie in a Bottle" became Aguilera's early signature song, peaking atop the chart for five weeks. She followed up this success with Spanish language and Christmas albums, Mi Reflejo (2000) and My Kind of Christmas (2000) respectively, garnering success with various songs including "Ven Conmigo (Solamente Tú)" which topped the US Hot Latin Songs chart and "The Christmas Song" which reached top 20 on the Hot 100, marking the second highest charting position of the song on the chart in 55 years. In 2001, she recorded two collaborations, "Nobody Wants to Be Lonely" with Ricky Martin and "Lady Marmalade" with Mýa, Lil' Kim and Pink. The latter found international success, peaking atop various charts including the Hot 100 for five consecutive weeks.

Aguilera released her fourth studio album, Stripped (2002), which debuted at number two on the US Billboard 200 and spawned the single "Beautiful", which peaked at number two on the Hot 100 and number one in the UK. The album has gone on to become one of the best-selling albums of the 21st century. She followed this up with her dual disc fifth studio album, Back to Basics (2006), which found commercial success and debuted atop the Billboard 200. The album garnered the top-ten Hot 100 single "Ain't No Other Man" and top-30 singles "Hurt" and "Candyman". Aguilera released her first greatest hits album, Keeps Gettin' Better: A Decade of Hits (2008) alongside the single "Keeps Gettin' Better," which debuted at number seven on the Hot 100, marking her highest debut on the chart. During these years, she also released the singles "Car Wash", "Tilt Ya Head Back" and "Tell Me".

In 2010, Aguilera released her sixth studio album Bionic (2010), which debuted at number three in the US. Its lead single, "Not Myself Tonight", topped the US Dance Club Songs chart and reached number 23 on the Hot 100. Aguilera's seventh studio album, Lotus (2012) also stalled on the chart, debuting at number seven, marking her lowest charting studio album at the time. Its lead single "Your Body" fared averagely on the charts, also topping the US Dance Club Songs chart. Aguilera later found commercial success after featuring on the songs "Moves like Jagger", "Feel This Moment" and "Say Something". All three songs reached the top ten on the Hot 100, with "Moves Like Jagger" topping the Hot 100, making Aguilera one of the few artists to top the chart in three consecutive decades (1990s, 2000s, and 2010s). Aguilera took a semi-hiatus from music during her time on The Voice (2011–2016). From 2013 to 2016, she released a string of standalone singles including "We Remain", "Change" and "Telepathy".

Aguilera returned to music with her eighth studio album Liberation (2018). The album debuted at number six in the US and was preceded by various singles including "Accelerate" and "Fall in Line". In 2020, Aguilera re-recorded "Reflection" for the 2020 live adaptation of Mulan alongside a new song, "Loyal Brave True", which was shortlisted for an Academy Award for Best Original Song. In 2022, she released her second Spanish language and ninth studio album, Aguilera (2022), which was released in three extended plays, La Fuerza, La Tormenta and La Luz. In 2024 and 2025, she released a live EP and soundtrack album for the 25th anniversary of both her debut and Christmas album, respectively. Throughout her career, Aguilera has also lent her vocals to various soundtracks, including that for Moulin Rouge! (2001), Shark Tale (2004), The Hunger Games: Catching Fire (2013) and The Addams Family (2019).

== Albums ==
=== Studio albums ===
List of studio albums, with selected chart positions, sales figures, and certifications
Title	Album details	Peak chart positions										Sales	Certifications
Title	Album details	US	AUS	AUT	CAN	GER	NLD	NZ	SPA	SWI	UK	Sales	Certifications
Christina Aguilera	Released: August 24, 1999 (US); Label: RCA; Formats: CD, LP, cassette, digital download	1	21	15	1	13	21	5	9	5	14	US: 9,235,000 (Note: United States combined sales figures for Christina Aguilera as of August 2019. The album has sold 8,300,000 in the US according to Nielsen SoundScan, with an additional 935,000 sold at BMG Music Clubs. Nielsen SoundScan does not count albums sold through clubs like the BMG Music Service, which were significantly popular in the 1990s.)	RIAA: 9× Platinum; ARIA: Platinum; BPI: Platinum; IFPI SWI: Gold; MC: 6× Platinum; NVPI: Gold; PROMUSICAE: Platinum; RMNZ: Platinum
Mi Reflejo	Released: September 12, 2000 (US); Label: RCA, BMG U.S. Latin; Formats: CD, cassette, digital download	27	—	—	—	—	—	—	12	54	—	US: 489,000 (Note: United States sales figures for Mi Reflejo as of August 2019.)	RIAA: 6× Platinum (Latin); PROMUSICAE: Platinum
My Kind of Christmas	Released: October 24, 2000 (US); Label: RCA; Formats: CD, LP, digital download	28	188	—	—	—	—	—	—	—	— (Note: My Kind of Christmas did not enter the UK Albums Chart, but peaked at number 21 on the UK Budget Albums chart.)	US: 1,000,000 (Note: United States sales figures for My Kind of Christmas as of August 2019.)	RIAA: Platinum
Stripped	Released: October 26, 2002 (ITA); Label: RCA; Formats: CD, LP, digital download	2	7	10	3	6	3	5	14	9	2	US: 4,400,000 (Note: United States sales figures for Stripped as of August 2019.); UK: 2,030,000 (Note: United Kingdom sales figures for Stripped as of April 2020.)	RIAA: 5× Platinum; ARIA: 4× Platinum; BPI: 7× Platinum; BVMI: 2× Platinum; IFPI AUT: Platinum; IFPI SWI: Platinum; MC: 4× Platinum; NVPI: Platinum; PROMUSICAE: Platinum; RMNZ: 2× Platinum
Back to Basics	Released: August 11, 2006 (various) (Note: Back to Basics was released on August 11, 2006 in Germany and Italy.); Label: RCA; Formats: CD, LP, digital download	1	1	1	1	1	1	2	4	1	1	US: 1,700,000 (Note: United States sales figures for Back to Basics as of August 2019.)	RIAA: 2× Platinum; ARIA: 2× Platinum; BPI: 2× Platinum; BVMI: 3× Gold; IFPI AUT: Gold; IFPI SWI: Platinum; MC: 3× Platinum; RMNZ: Platinum
Bionic	Released: June 4, 2010 (various) (Note: Bionic was released on June 4, 2010 in Germany and Spain.); Label: RCA; Formats: CD, LP, digital download	3	3	3	3	6	6	6	4	2	1	US: 332,000 (Note: United States sales figures for Bionic as of August 2019.)	RIAA: Gold; ARIA: Gold; BPI: Silver; IFPI AUT: Gold
Lotus	Released: November 9, 2012 (various) (Note: Both the standard and deluxe editions of Lotus were released on November 9, 2012, in stores worldwide, including Belgium, Finland, Germany, Norway, Portugal, United Kingdom, United States, and Taiwan.); Label: RCA; Formats: CD, LP, digital download	7	19	13	7	13	12	29	13	10	28	US: 303,000 (Note: United States sales figures for Lotus as of August 2019.)	RIAA: Gold; MC: Gold
Liberation	Released: June 15, 2018 (various); Label: RCA; Formats: CD, LP, digital download	6	9	9	5	11	11	23	1	3	17	US: 100,000 (Note: United States sales figures for Liberation as of August 2019.)	
Aguilera	Released: May 31, 2022; Label: Sony Latin; Formats: CD, LP, digital download	— (Note: Aguilera did not enter the Billboard 200, but peaked at number 16 on the US Latin Pop Albums chart.)	—	—	—	— (Note: Aguilera did not enter the German Offizielle Top 100 chart, but peaked at number 70 on the German Digital Albums chart.)	—	—	69	—	—		
"—" denotes a recording that did not chart or was not released in that territory.

=== Compilation albums ===
List of compilation albums, with selected chart positions, sales figures, and certifications
Title	Album details	Peak chart positions										Sales	Certifications
Title	Album details	US	AUS	AUT	CAN	GER	IRL	NLD	NZ	SWI	UK	Sales	Certifications
Just Be Free	Released: August 21, 2001 (US); Label: Warlock; Formats: CD, digital download	71	—	—	—	—	—	—	—	—	—	US: 129,000 (Note: United States sales figures for Just Be Free as of August 2019.)	
Christina Aguilera / Stripped	Released: October 2, 2006 (US); Label: Sony; Format: CD	—	—	—	—	—	—	—	—	—	164		
Keeps Gettin' Better: A Decade of Hits	Released: November 7, 2008 (US); Label: RCA; Formats: CD, digital download	9	8	10	12	20	9	28	15	14	10	US: 614,000 (Note: United States sales figures for Keeps Gettin' Better: A Decade of Hits as of August 2019.)	RIAA: Gold; ARIA: Platinum; BPI: 2× Platinum; IRMA: Gold; RMNZ: Gold
The Music Video Collection	Released: May 28, 2010 (various) (Note: The Music Video Collection was released on May 28, 2010 in Germany, France and Spain); Label: Sony; Format: Digital download	—	—	—	—	—	—	—	—	—	—		
"—" denotes a recording that did not chart or was not released in that territory.

=== Soundtrack albums ===
List of soundtrack albums, with selected chart positions, sales figures, and certifications
Title	Album details	Peak chart positions										Sales	Certifications
Title	Album details	US	US Sound.	AUS	AUT	CAN	GER	ITA	NZ	SWI	UK Sound.	Sales	Certifications
Burlesque: Original Motion Picture Soundtrack (with Cher)	Released: November 19, 2010 (various) (Note: Burlesque was released on November 19, 2010, in stores worldwide, including Belgium, Finland, Germany, Norway, Spain, Sweden, United Kingdom and United States); Label: RCA, Screen Gems; Formats: CD, digital download	18	1	2	5	16	12	14	5	8	9	US: 779,000 (Note: United States sales figures for Burlesque: Original Motion Picture Soundtrack as of August 2019.)	RIAA: Gold; ARIA: Platinum; BPI: Gold; BVMI: Gold; MC: Gold; RMNZ: Platinum
Christmas in Paris	Released: December 14, 2025; Label: 5020 Records, Three Wishes; Formats: Streaming	—	—	—	—	—	—	—	—	—	— (Note: Christmas in Paris did not enter the UK Albums Chart or the UK Soundtrack Albums, but peaked at number 33 on the UK Download Albums Chart.)		

=== Video albums ===
List of video albums, with selected details, chart positions, and certifications
Title	Video details	Peak chart positions							Certifications
Title	Video details	US	AUS	BEL	GER	MEX	SWE	UK	Certifications
Genie Gets Her Wish	Released: December 14, 1999; Format: DVD, VHS, CD (Note: The video was also released as a CD alongside Stripped Live in the U.K. in Germany on March 26, 2010.); Label: RCA	7	—	—	—	—	1	11	RIAA: Platinum
My Reflection	Released: June 5, 2001; Format: DVD, VHS; Label: RCA	1	8	—	—	—	—	6	RIAA: Gold; ARIA: Platinum
Stripped Live in the U.K.	Released: November 15, 2004; Format: DVD, CD (Note: The video was also released as a CD alongside Stripped in the US on December 8, 2008.); Label: RCA	3	4	6	23	7	7	6	RIAA: Platinum; ARIA: 3× Platinum; BPI: Platinum; BVMI: Gold
Back to Basics and Beyond	Released: Fall 2006 (Note: The album was released exclusively in Canada and the United States by Walmart.); Format: NTSC; Label: RCA	—	—	—	—	—	—	—	
Back to Basics: Live and Down Under	Released: February 4, 2008; Format: DVD, digital download; Label: RCA	1	2	1	—	5	2	1	RIAA: Gold; ARIA: 3× Platinum

== Extended plays ==
List of extended plays
Title	EP details	Peak chart positions						Notes
Title	EP details	US Latin Pop	US Latin	US Sales	SPA	SWI	UK Down.	Notes
Justin & Christina (with Justin Timberlake)	Released: July 1, 2003 (US); Label: Sony BMG; Format: CD	—	—	—	—	—	—	The extended play was released exclusively in Target stores in support of Aguilera and Justin Timberlake's Justified and Stripped Tour (2003), and consists of four remixes of the two artists' original songs and two new tracks: "That's What Love Can Do" by Aguilera and "Why, When, How" by Timberlake.
La Fuerza	Released: January 21, 2022; Label: Sony Latin; Format: Digital download, streaming	2	14	78	54	79	31	
La Tormenta	Released: May 30, 2022; Label: Sony Latin; Format: Digital download, streaming	—	—	—	—	—	—	
La Luz	Released: September 29, 2022; Label: Sony Latin; Format: Digital download, streaming	—	—	—	—	—	—	
The 25th Anniversary of Christina Aguilera (Spotify Anniversaries Live)	Released: September 23, 2024; Label: 5020 Records, Three Wishes; Format: Streaming	—	—	—	—	—	—	Spotify-exclusive EP released on September 23, 2024, to celebrate the 25th anniversary of Aguilera's debut album. The video project features reimagined and unplugged renditions of "Come on Over", "Genie in a Bottle" with Machine Gun Kelly, "Obvious", "I Turn to You", "What a Girl Wants" with Sabrina Carpenter and "Reflection".

== Singles ==
=== 1990s ===
List of singles as lead artist, with selected chart positions, sales figures, certifications, showing year released and album name
Title	Year	Peak chart positions										Sales	Certifications	Album
Title	Year	US	AUS	AUT	CAN	GER	IRL	NLD	NZ	SWI	UK	Sales	Certifications	Album
"All I Wanna Do" (with Keizo Nakanishi) (Note: "All I Wanna Do" was released as a single in Japan in 1997.)	1997	—	—	—	—	—	—	—	—	—	—			Non-album single
"Reflection"	1998	— (Note: "Reflection" did not enter the Billboard Hot 100, but peaked at number 19 on the Adult Contemporary chart.)	—	—	—	—	—	—	—	—	—			Mulan: An Original Walt Disney Records Soundtrack
"Genie in a Bottle"	1999	1	2	1	1	2	2	2	2	2	1	US: 1,436,000 (Note: United States sales figures for "Genie in a Bottle" as of September 2014.); UK: 1,040,000 (Note: United Kingdom sales figures for "Genie in a Bottle" as of October 2021.)	RIAA: 3× Platinum; ARIA: Platinum; BPI: 2× Platinum; BVMI: Platinum; IFPI AUT: Gold; IFPI SWI: Gold; MC: 2× Platinum; RMNZ: 2× Platinum	Christina Aguilera
"The Christmas Song (Chestnuts Roasting on an Open Fire)"	1999	18	—	—	22	—	—	—	—	—	—			My Kind of Christmas
"What a Girl Wants"	1999	1	5	22	5	18	7	9	1	17	3	US: 605,000 (Note: United States sales figures for "What a Girl Wants" as of September 2014.); UK: 163,000 (Note: United Kingdom sales figures for "What a Girl Wants" as of 2000.)	RIAA: Platinum; ARIA: Gold; BPI: Silver; MC: Gold; RMNZ: Gold	Christina Aguilera
"—" denotes a recording that did not chart or was not released in that territory.

=== 2000s ===
List of singles as lead artist, with selected chart positions, sales figures, certifications, showing year released and album name
Title	Year	Peak chart positions										Sales	Certifications	Album
Title	Year	US	AUS	AUT	CAN	GER	IRE	NLD	NZ	SWI	UK	Sales	Certifications	Album
"I Turn to You"	2000	3	40	1	10	65	17	40	11	30	19			Christina Aguilera
"Come on Over Baby (All I Want is You)"	2000	1	9	35	14	23	9	6	2	21	8	US: 579,000 (Note: United States sales figures for "Come On Over Baby (All I Want Is You)" as of September 2014.)	RIAA: Platinum; ARIA: Platinum; BPI: Silver; MC: Gold; RMNZ: Gold	Christina Aguilera
"Ven Conmigo (Solamente Tú)"	2000	— (Note: "Ven Conmigo (Solamente Tú)" did not enter the Billboard Hot 100, but peaked at number 1 on the Hot Latin Songs chart, and at number 1 on the Tropical Airplay chart.)	—	—	—	—	—	—	—	—	—			Mi Reflejo
"Pero Me Acuerdo de Ti"	2000	— (Note: "Pero Me Acuerdo de Ti" did not enter the Billboard Hot 100, but peaked at number 5 on the Latin Pop Airplay chart, and at number 8 on the Hot Latin Songs chart.)	—	—	—	—	—	—	—	—	—			Mi Reflejo
"Nobody Wants to Be Lonely" (with Ricky Martin)	2001	13	8	13	6	5	12	3	1	2	4	UK: 144,020 (Note: United Kingdom sales figures for "Nobody Wants to Be Lonely" as of 2001.)	ARIA: Gold; BPI: Silver; IFPI SWI: Gold; NVPI: Gold	Sound Loaded
"Lady Marmalade" (with Lil' Kim, Mýa and Pink)	2001	1	1	3	17	1	1	2	1	1	1	UK: 869,000 (Note: United Kingdom sales figures for "Lady Marmalade" as of June 2019.)	RIAA: Platinum; ARIA: 2× Platinum; BPI: 2× Platinum; BVMI: Platinum; IFPI AUT: Gold; IFPI SWI: Gold; NVPI: Platinum; RMNZ: 2× Platinum	Moulin Rouge!
"Falsas Esperanzas"	2001	—	—	—	—	—	—	— (Note: "Falsas Esperanzas" did not enter the Dutch Top 40, but peaked at number 7 on the Dutch Top 40 Tipparade, which acts as a 30-song extension to the Top 40.)	—	—	—			Mi Reflejo
"Dirrty" (featuring Redman)	2002	48	4	5	5	4	1	2	20	3	1	UK: 593,000 (Note: United Kingdom sales figures for "Dirrty" as of June 2019.)	RIAA: Platinum; ARIA: Platinum; BPI: Platinum; BVMI: Gold; IFPI SWI: Gold; MC: 2× Platinum; NVPI: Gold; RMNZ: Platinum	Stripped
"Beautiful"	2002	2	1	5	1	4	1	2	1	7	1	US: 1,512,000 (Note: United States sales figures for "Beautiful" as of September 2014.); UK: 568,000 (Note: United Kingdom sales figures for "Beautiful" as of June 2019.)	RIAA: 2× Platinum; ARIA: Platinum; BPI: Platinum; MC: 2× Platinum; RMNZ: Platinum	Stripped
"Fighter"	2003	20	5	12	3	13	4	5	14	11	3	US: 1,184,000 (Note: United States sales figures for "Fighter" as of September 2014.); UK: 80,000 (Note: United Kingdom sales figures for "Fighter" as of 2003.)	RIAA: 2× Platinum; ARIA: Gold; BPI: Platinum; MC: Platinum; RMNZ: Platinum	Stripped
"Can't Hold Us Down" (featuring Lil' Kim)	2003	12	5	13	—	9	5	10	2	11	6		ARIA: Gold; BPI: Silver; RMNZ: Gold	Stripped
"The Voice Within"	2003	33	8	7	10	13	4	6	16	3	9		BPI: Silver	Stripped
"Car Wash" (featuring Missy Elliott)	2004	63	2	11	—	6	5	3	2	5	4		ARIA: Gold; BPI: Silver; RMNZ: Gold	Shark Tale: Motion Picture Soundtrack
"Ain't No Other Man"	2006	6	6	7	4	5	3	11	5	5	2	US: 1,783,000 (Note: United States sales figures for "Ain't No Other Man" as of September 2014.)	RIAA: 2× Platinum; ARIA: Gold; BPI: Gold; MC: Platinum; RMNZ: Gold	Back to Basics
"Hurt"	2006	19	9	2	28	2	6	2	—	1	11	US: 1,187,000 (Note: United States sales figures for "Hurt" as of September 2014.)	RIAA: Platinum; ARIA: Gold; BPI: Gold; BVMI: Gold; IFPI AUT: Gold; IFPI SWI: Gold; MC: Gold	Back to Basics
"Candyman"	2007	25	2	14	9	11	12	12	2	11	17	US: 1,153,000 (Note: United States sales figures for "Candyman" as of September 2014.)	RIAA: Platinum; ARIA: Platinum; BPI: Platinum; MC: Gold; RMNZ: Platinum	Back to Basics
"Slow Down Baby"	2007	—	21	—	—	—	—	—	—	—	—			Back to Basics
"Oh Mother"	2007	—	—	23	—	18	—	— (Note: "Oh Mother" did not enter the Dutch Top 40, but peaked at number 12 on the Dutch Top 40 Tipparade.)	—	79	—			Back to Basics
"Keeps Gettin' Better"	2008	7	26	15	4	14	14	— (Note: "Keeps Gettin' Better" did not enter the Dutch Top 40, but peaked at number 6 on the Dutch Top 40 Tipparade.)	36	21	14	US: 1,156,000 (Note: United States sales figures for "Keeps Gettin' Better" as of September 2014.)		Keeps Gettin' Better: A Decade of Hits

=== 2010s ===
List of singles as lead artist, with selected chart positions, sales figures, certifications, showing year released and album name
Title	Year	Peak chart positions										Sales	Certifications	Album
Title	Year	US	US Dance	AUS	AUT	CAN	GER	HUN	NZ	SWI	UK	Sales	Certifications	Album
"Not Myself Tonight"	2010	23	1	22	26	11	24	2	32	42	12	US: 368,000 (Note: United States sales figures for "Not Myself Tonight" as of March 2011.)	ARIA: Gold	Bionic
"Woohoo" (featuring Nicki Minaj)	2010	79	—	—	—	46	—	—	—	—	148			Bionic
"You Lost Me"	2010	— (Note: "You Lost Me" did not enter the Billboard Hot 100, but peaked at number 20 on the Bubbling Under Hot 100 Singles chart, which acts as a 25-song extension to the Hot 100.)	1	—	—	—	—	—	—	—	153			Bionic
"I Hate Boys" (Note: "I Hate Boys" was released as a single off Bionic in Australia and New Zealand as a digital single.)	2010	—	—	— (Note: "I Hate Boys" did not enter the ARIA Top 100 Singles Chart but managed to peak at number 28 on the Australia Airplay chart.)	—	—	—	—	—	—	—			Bionic
"Express"	2010	— (Note: "Express" did not enter the Billboard Hot 100, but peaked at number 2 on the Bubbling Under Hot 100 Singles chart.)	—	58	—	—	—	—	—	54	75			Burlesque
"Show Me How You Burlesque"	2010	70	—	29	—	92	89	—	8	26	—		BPI: Silver	Burlesque
"Your Body"	2012	34	1	59	19	10	29	23	34	22	16		RMNZ: Gold	Lotus
"Just a Fool" (with Blake Shelton)	2012	71	—	—	—	37	—	—	—	—	—	US: 802,000 (Note: United States sales figures for "Just a Fool" as of April 2015.)		Lotus
"Say Something" (with A Great Big World)	2013	4	1	1	4	1	36	38	2	20	4	US: 4,000,000 (Note: United States sales figures for "Say Something" as of December 2014.); UK: 1,800,000 (Note: United Kingdom sales figures for "Say Something" as of June 2019.)	RIAA: Diamond; ARIA: 3× Platinum; BPI: 3× Platinum; BVMI: Platinum; IFPI AUT: Gold; IFPI SWI: Gold; MC: 6× Platinum; RMNZ: 4× Platinum	Is There Anybody Out There?
"We Remain"	2013	— (Note: "We Remain" did not enter the Billboard Hot 100, but reached number 64 on the Digital Song Sales chart.)	—	177	—	—	—	—	—	—	144			The Hunger Games: Catching Fire
"Change"	2016	— (Note: "Change" did not enter the Billboard Hot 100, but peaked at number 5 on the Bubbling Under Hot 100 Singles chart.)	—	172	—	— (Note: "Change" did not enter the Canadian Hot 100, but peaked at number 36 on the Canada AC chart.)	—	—	—	—	173			Non-album single
"Telepathy" (featuring Nile Rodgers)	2016	—	1	—	—	—	—	—	—	—	—			The Get Down
"Accelerate" (featuring Ty Dolla Sign and 2 Chainz)	2018	— (Note: "Accelerate" did not enter the Billboard Hot 100, but peaked at number 24 on the Bubbling Under Hot 100 Singles chart.)	1	—	—	— (Note: "Accelerate" did not enter the Canadian Hot 100, but peaked at number 49 on the Canadian Digital Song Sales chart.)	—	22	—	—	— (Note: "Accelerate" did not enter the UK Singles Chart, but peaked at number 71 on the UK Singles Downloads Chart.)			Liberation
"Fall in Line" (featuring Demi Lovato)	2018	— (Note: "Fall in Line" did not enter the Billboard Hot 100, but peaked at number one on the Bubbling Under Hot 100 Singles chart.)	—	—	—	97	—	17	—	86	99			Liberation
"Like I Do" (featuring GoldLink)	2018	—	—	—	—	—	—	—	—	—	—			Liberation
"Haunted Heart"	2019	— (Note: "Haunted Heart" did not enter the Billboard Hot 100, but peaked at number 1 on the Kid Digital Song Sales chart.)	—	—	—	—	—	—	—	—	—			The Addams Family
"Fall on Me" (with A Great Big World)	2019	— (Note: "Fall on Me" did not enter the Billboard Hot 100, but peaked at number 9 on the Digital Songs Sales chart.)	—	—	—	— (Note: "Fall on Me" did not enter the Canadian Hot 100, but peaked at number 27 on the Canadian Digital Song Sales chart.)	—	—	—	—	—			Particles
"—" denotes a recording that did not chart or was not released in that territory.

=== 2020s ===
List of singles as lead artist, with selected chart positions and certifications, showing year released and album name
Title	Year	Peak chart positions							Certifications	Album
Title	Year	US	US Latin	CAN	GER	HUN	SPA	UK	Certifications	Album
"Loyal Brave True"	2020	— (Note: "Loyal Brave True" did not enter the Billboard Hot 100, but peaked at number 24 on the Digital Songs chart.)	—	— (Note: "Loyal Brave True" did not enter the Canadian Hot 100, but peaked at number 45 on the Canadian Digital Song Sales chart.)	—	—	—	— (Note: "Loyal Brave True" did not enter the UK Singles Chart, but peaked at number 49 on the UK Singles Downloads Chart.)		Mulan
"Reflection"	2020	— (Note: "Reflection" did not enter the Billboard Hot 100, but peaked at number 20 on the Digital Songs chart.)	—	—	—	—	—	— (Note: "Reflection" did not enter the UK Singles Chart, but peaked at number 35 on the UK Singles Downloads Chart.)	RIAA: Gold	Mulan
"Pa Mis Muchachas" (with Becky G and Nicki Nicole featuring Nathy Peluso)	2021	— (Note: "Pa Mis Muchachas" did not enter the Billboard Hot 100, but peaked at number 3 at the Latin Digital Song Sales chart.)	37	—	— (Note: Pa Mis Muchachas did not enter the German Official German Charts chart, but peaked at number 76 on the Germany Download Official German Charts.)	24	68	—	RIAA: Platinum (Latin)	Aguilera
"Somos Nada"	2021	— (Note: "Somos Nada" did not enter the Billboard Hot 100, but peaked at number 5 on the Latin Digital Songs chart.)	—	—	—	—	— (Note: "Somos Nada" did not enter the Spain songs chart but peaked at number 10 on the Spain Digital Songs chart.)	—		Aguilera
"Santo" (with Ozuna)	2022	— (Note: "Santo" did not enter the Billboard Hot 100, but peaked at number 3 at the Latin Digital Song Sales chart.)	24	—	80	17	72	—	RIAA: Platinum (Latin)	Aguilera
"Suéltame" (with Tini)	2022	—	— (Note: "Suéltame" did not enter the US Hot Latin Songs, but peaked at number 23 on the Latin Pop Airplay chart.)	—	—	—	—	—		Aguilera
"No Es Que Te Extrañe"	2022	— (Note: "No Es Que Te Extrañe" did not enter the Billboard Hot 100, but peaked at number 9 on the Latin Digital Song Sales chart.)	—	—	—	—	—	—		Aguilera
"Learning to Fly"	2023	—	—	—	—	—	—	—		Non-album single
"My Favorite Things"	2025	—	—	—	—	—	—	—		Christmas in Paris
"Someday at Christmas"	2025	—	—	—	—	—	—	—		Christmas in Paris
"—" denotes a recording that did not chart or was not released in that territory.

=== As featured artist ===
List of singles as featured artist, with selected chart positions, sales figures, certifications, showing year released and album name
Title	Year	Peak chart positions										Sales	Certifications	Album
Title	Year	US	AUS	AUT	CAN	GER	IRL	NLD	NZ	SWI	UK	Sales	Certifications	Album
"What's Going On" (with Artists Against AIDS Worldwide)	2001	27	38	51	—	35	8	24	18	16	6		RMNZ: Gold	Non-album singles
"El Ultimo Adios (The Last Goodbye)" (with various artists)	2001	—	—	—	—	—	—	—	—	—	—			Non-album singles
"Tilt Ya Head Back" (Nelly featuring Christina Aguilera)	2004	58	5	42	— (Note: "Tilt Ya Head Back" did not enter the Canadian Singles Chart, but peaked at number 24 on the Radio & Records′ Canada CHR/Pop Top 30 chart.)	27	12	16	4	16	5		RIAA: Gold; ARIA: Platinum	Sweat
"Somos Novios (It's Impossible)" (Andrea Bocelli featuring Christina Aguilera)	2006	—	—	—	—	—	—	—	—	—	—			Amore
"Tell Me" (Diddy featuring Christina Aguilera)	2006	47	13	19	—	5	8	13	—	7	8		BPI: Silver	Press Play
"Moves like Jagger" (Maroon 5 featuring Christina Aguilera)	2011	1	2	1	1	2	1	1	1	5	2	US: 6,507,000 (Note: United States sales figures for "Moves Like Jagger" as of September 2014.); UK: 1,900,000 (Note: United Kingdom sales figures for "Moves like Jagger" as of June 2019.)	RIAA: Diamond; ARIA: 17× Platinum; BPI: 5× Platinum; BVMI: 5× Gold; IFPI SWI: Platinum; MC: Diamond; RMNZ: 8× Platinum	Hands All Over
"Feel This Moment" (Pitbull featuring Christina Aguilera)	2013	8	6	2	4	9	13	6	5	7	5	US: 2,406,000 (Note: United States sales figures for "Feel This Moment" as of September 2014.)	RIAA: 6× Platinum; ARIA: 3× Platinum; BPI: Platinum; BVMI: Gold; IFPI AUT: Gold; IFPI SWI: Platinum; MC: 4× Platinum; RMNZ: 2× Platinum	Global Warming
"Hoy Tengo Ganas de Ti" (Alejandro Fernández featuring Christina Aguilera)	2013	— (Note: "Hoy Tengo Ganas de Ti" did not enter the Billboard Hot 100, but peaked at number 3 on the Latin Digital Song Sales chart.)	—	—	—	—	—	—	—	—	—			Confidencias
"—" denotes a recording that did not chart or was not released in that territory.

=== Promotional singles ===
List of promotional singles, with selected chart positions, showing year released and album name
Title	Year	Peak chart positions								Notes	Album
Title	Year	US	US Country	AUS Dig.	DEN	KOR Down.	GRC Air.	RUS	UK	Notes	Album
"Just Be Free"	1997	—	—	—	—	—	—	—	—	Originally released in 1997 by Bam Records Inc., the artist is credited simply as 'Christina'. The song was later re-released in the UK on July 11, 2000, as a maxi single. An EP containing remixes and other versions of the track was also released on September 1, 2001.	Just Be Free
"Love Will Find a Way"	1999	—	—	—	—	—	—	—	—	The song was released in 1999 on a compact disc as a promotional single in Japan from Christina Aguilera.	Christina Aguilera
"Genio Atrapado"	1999	—	—	—	—	—	—	—	—	The song was released in 1999 on a compact disc as a promotional single for the Spanish, Latin American and Brazilian editions of Christina Aguilera.	Christina Aguilera
"Christmas Time"	2000	—	—	—	—	—	29	—	—	The song was released in December 2000 on a compact disc as a promotional single from My Kind of Christmas. RCA released the song in the United States, and BMG distributed it throughout Europe.	My Kind of Christmas
"So Emotional"	2001	—	—	—	—	—	—	—	—	The song was released in 2001 on a compact disc as a promotional single in Thailand from Christina Aguilera.	Christina Aguilera
"Impossible"	2002	—	—	—	—	—	—	—	—	The song was released in 2002 in Spain from Stripped to promote the album.	Stripped
"Infatuation"	2002	—	—	—	—	—	—	—	—	The song was released in 2002 in Spain from Stripped to promote the album.	Stripped
"Hello"	2004	—	—	—	—	—	—	—	—	The song was recorded and released by Aguilera in support of the Mercedes-Benz A-Class car for the German manufacturer Mercedes-Benz.	Non-album promotional single
"Here to Stay"	2006	—	—	—	—	—	—	—	—	The song was used in a Pepsi commercial in 2006 and was made available for free download to promote Back to Basics.	Back to Basics
"Genie 2.0"	2008	—	—	—	—	—	—	—	161	The songs were released to the iTunes Store in the United States to promote Keeps Gettin' Better: A Decade of Hits.	Keeps Gettin' Better: A Decade of Hits
"You Are What You Are (Beautiful)"	2008	—	—	—	—	—	—	—	—	The songs were released to the iTunes Store in the United States to promote Keeps Gettin' Better: A Decade of Hits.	Keeps Gettin' Better: A Decade of Hits
"Dynamite"	2008	—	—	—	—	—	—	146	—	The song was released as a promotional single in Japan on November 20, 2008. It was released to the iTunes Store in the United States, too.	Keeps Gettin' Better: A Decade of Hits
"Lift Me Up"	2011	— (Note: "Lift Me Up" did not enter the Billboard Hot 100, but peaked at number 25 on the Bubbling Under Hot 100 Singles chart.)	—	—	—	35	—	—	183 (Note: In the United Kingdom the song also debuted at number 26 on the Independent Singles Chart, as reported by the Official Charts Company.)	The song was released as a promotional single in Poland for Bionic.	Bionic
"Beautiful" (with Beverly McClellan)	2011	74	—	—	—	—	—	—	—	The songs were released to the iTunes Store in the United States to promote The Voice.	Non-album promotional singles
"The Prayer" (with Chris Mann)	2012	85	—	—	—	—	—	—	—	The songs were released to the iTunes Store in the United States to promote The Voice.	Non-album promotional singles
"Let There Be Love"	2013	— (Note: "Let There Be Love" did not enter the Billboard Hot 100, but peaked at number 1 on the Hot Dance Club Songs chart.)	—	—	—	132	—	—	—	Released as a promotional single with dance mixes in the United States for Lotus.	Lotus
"We Remain" (with Jacquie Lee)	2013	— (Note: "We Remain"—the version recorded with Lee—did not enter the Billboard Hot 100, but peaked at number 28 on the Pop Digital Song Sales chart.)	—	—	—	—	—	—	—	The song was released to the iTunes Store in the United States to promote The Voice.	The Complete Season 5 Collection
"Do What U Want" (Lady Gaga featuring Christina Aguilera)	2014	—	—	—	27	—	—	—	—		Non-album promotional singles
"The Real Thing" (Nashville Cast featuring Christina Aguilera)	2015	—	—	—	—	—	—	—	—	The songs were released to the iTunes Store in the United States to promote her guest appearance on Nashville.	Non-album promotional singles
"Shotgun" (Nashville Cast featuring Christina Aguilera)	2015	— (Note: "Shotgun" did not enter the Billboard Hot 100, but peaked at number 14 on the Bubbling Under Hot 100.)	28	—	—	—	—	—	—	The songs were released to the iTunes Store in the United States to promote her guest appearance on Nashville.	Non-album promotional singles
"You've Got a Friend" (with Alisan Porter)	2016	—	—	—	—	—	—	—	—	The song was released to the iTunes Store in the United States to promote The Voice.	The Complete Season 10 Collection
"Twice"	2018	— (Note: "Twice" did not enter the Billboard Hot 100, but peaked at number 42 on the Digital Songs chart.)	—	35	—	—	—	—	—	The song was released as a promotional single from Aguilera's eighth album, Liberation.	Liberation
"Intro (La Luz)"	2022	—	—	—	—	—	—	—	—		Aguilera
"—" denotes a recording that did not chart or was not released in that territory.

== Other charted songs ==
List of songs, with selected chart positions, showing year released and album name
Title	Year	Peak chart positions										Album
Title	Year	US	US Hol. Dig.	US Latin Dig.	AUS Dig.	CAN	DEN	KOR Down.	LTU	NLD	UK	Album
"Have Yourself a Merry Little Christmas"	2000	—	18	—	—	—	—	—	84	95	—	My Kind of Christmas
"I Will Be"	2002	—	—	—	—	—	—	74	—	—	—	—N/a (Note: Released as a B-side to the "Dirrty" and later included on the 20th anniversary edition of Stripped.)
"Walk Away"	2002	—	—	—	—	—	35	—	—	—	—	Stripped
"Without You"	2006	—	—	—	35	—	—	—	—	—	—	Back to Basics
"Bionic"	2010	66	—	—	—	—	—	23	—	—	—	Bionic
"Glam"	2010	—	—	—	—	—	—	2	—	—	—	Bionic
"Castle Walls" (T.I. featuring Christina Aguilera)	2010	— (Note: "Castle Walls" did not enter the Billboard Hot 100, but peaked at number 5 on the Bubbling Under Hot 100 Singles chart.)	—	—	—	99	—	6	—	—	—	No Mercy
"Baby, It's Cold Outside" (CeeLo Green featuring Christina Aguilera)	2012	—	5	—	—	92	—	—	—	—	—	Cee Lo's Magic Moment
"Ya Llegué"	2022	—	—	7	—	—	—	—	—	—	—	Aguilera
"La Reina"	2022	—	—	9	—	—	—	—	—	—	—	Aguilera
"Cuando Me Dé la Gana" (with Christian Nodal)	2022	—	—	21	—	—	—	—	—	—	—	Aguilera
"Did Somebody Say HipOpera" (with Latto)	2024	— (Note: "Did Somebody Say HipOpera" did not enter the Billboard Hot 100, but peaked at number 28 on the TikTok Billboard Top 50 chart.)	—	—	—	—	—	—	—	—	—	—N/a
"—" denotes a recording that did not chart or was not released in that territory.

== See also ==
- List of Christina Aguilera concerts
- List of Christina Aguilera concert tours
- List of songs recorded by Christina Aguilera
- Christina Aguilera videography

== Footnotes ==
Notes for albums and songs

Notes for peak chart positions
