= List of Christina Aguilera concerts =

Christina Aguilera concerts
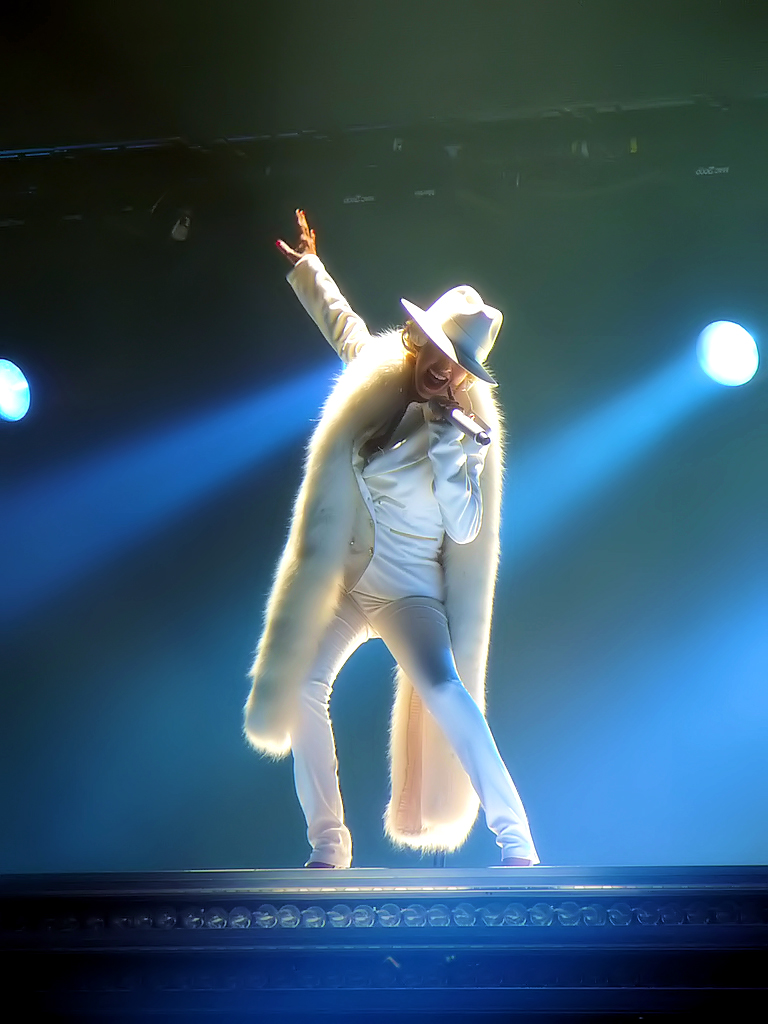
- Aguilera opening the Back to Basics Tour, her highest grossing tour, with "Ain't No Other Man" in 2006.
- Concert tours: 6
- Promotional tours: 1
- Concert residencies: 1
- Stand-alone concerts: 7
- Benefit concerts: 7
- Music festivals: 17

American singer Christina Aguilera has performed on six concert tours, one promotional tour and one concert residencies. Additionally, she has performed at seventeen music festivals, and seven benefit concerts. She began her touring career in 2000, with Christina Aguilera in Concert. Originally held in North America in 2000 to promote her debut album, Christina Aguilera (1999), it was extended into 2001 following the release of Mi Reflejo (2000), with shows in Latin America and Asia. The tour was received well by critics, who complimented Aguilera's showmanship and vocals, which received comparisons to Mariah Carey and Whitney Houston. The touring act for Stripped (2002) was performed across two tours: The Justified & Stripped Tour with Justin Timberlake and The Stripped Tour. Lasting 45 shows, The Justified & Stripped Tour kicked off in June 2003 and became 16th highest-grossing tour of 2003. In September, Aguilera continued the tour without Timberlake, taking the show to Europe, Japan, and Australia until the end of the year. Her set was compared to Cher's image in the 1980s by several critics. An additional 29 dates were scheduled for 2004 with a new theme, but were cancelled after Aguilera suffered a vocal cord injury.

The Back to Basics Tour began in November 2006 and continued until October 2008, visiting cities in Europe, North America, Asia and Australia. With 61 dates throughout 2007, it was the highest grossing female artist tour of the year (second highest overall), with a revenue of $43,566,000 in that year. The tour was a critical and commercial success, receiving acclaim by contemporary critics, who complimented the tour's visuals, choreography, and Aguilera's on-stage attitude, and grossed a total of over $48.1 million from 82 dates. In 2010, Aguilera scheduled a 20 date North American summer tour in support of Bionic (2010) titled The Bionic Tour, which was scheduled to begin in July of that year. The tour was cancelled due to Aguilera's tight schedule for the promotion of the album and her film, Burlesque (2010). Aguilera did not tour again until 2018, to focus on her family. In 2016, Aguilera headlined the Mawazine festival in Rabat, Morocco. Her performance at the festival attracted a crowd of 250,000 people, beating the 160,000 people record set by Jennifer Lopez the year prior. Liberation (2018) was promoted through two tours. The Liberation Tour visited cities throughout North America, starting in September 2018 and concluding in December, grossing $8.7 million from 21 shows. It was named one of the best live shows by Billboard, and its gross ranked #132 out of Pollstar's Top 200 North American Tours year-end chart. The X Tour visited Europe starting in July 2019, and concluding with three shows in Mexico in December. It grossed over $5.4 million from nine reported shows.

Starting in May 2019, Aguilera headlined her first concert residency, officially named Christina Aguilera: The Xperience. It was held at the Zappos Theater at Planet Hollywood Las Vegas. Themed around outer space and retrofuturism, the show was a five-sensory experience. The residency was a critical and commercial success, grossing $10.2 million from its first four legs, and receiving acclaim. Aguilera was set to perform the final leg of The Xperience, as well as kick off a North American summer tour with Adam Lambert in 2020, but these plans fell through due to the COVID-19 pandemic. Aguilera returned to the stage with Christina Aguilera with the LA Phil, a two night set with the Los Angeles Philharmonic held on July 16 and 17, 2021. The shows were a commercial success, selling out the Hollywood Bowl for both nights, and received widespread acclaim from critics. In 2022 embarked on the EU/UK Summer Series promotional tour in support of her second Spanish-language album, Aguilera (2022). The tour consisted of five festival headlining shows and three arena shows in Scarborough, Liverpool, and London, with Union J as the opening act. Several of the shows were sold out. The set received positive reviews for it "dazzling and dramatic" nature.

According to Billboard, Aguilera's career gross is $81.7 million with an attendance of 1.5 million as of July 2019. Pollstar reports that Aguilera's total career gross as of November 2022 is $115,349,316 with an average gross of $613,000 and 9,855 tickets per concert.

== Concert tours ==
Title	Dates	Associated album(s)	Location	Shows	Gross	Gross adj. in 2025	Attendance	Ref.
Christina Aguilera in Concert	May 19, 2000– February 1, 2001	Christina Aguilera; Mi Reflejo	North America; Europe; Latin America; Asia	82	$1,829,356	$3,326,258.09	35,339	
The Justified & Stripped Tour (co-headlined with Justin Timberlake)	June 4, 2003– September 2, 2003	Stripped; Justified	North America	45	$30,261,670	$52,963,396.75	546,483	
The Stripped Tour (Note: Also titled Stripped World Tour and Stripped... Live.)	September 22, 2003– December 17, 2003	Stripped	Europe; Asia; Australia	37	Undisclosed			
Back to Basics Tour	November 17, 2006– October 24, 2008	Back to Basics	Europe; North America; Asia; Australia	82	$48,173,773	$74,800,393.8	907,568	
The Liberation Tour	September 25, 2018– November 13, 2018	Liberation	North America	21	$8,700,000	$11,154,585.21	77,854	
The X Tour	July 4, 2019– December 7, 2019	Liberation	Europe; Latin America	18	$5,418,150	$6,822,933.91	76,711	

=== Cancelled tours ===
Title	Dates	Associated album(s)	Location	Shows	Additional act(s)	Ref.
Stripped North American Tour	May 13, 2004– July 3, 2004	Stripped	North America	29	Chingy (s.)	
The Bionic Tour	July 15, 2010– August 19, 2010	Bionic	North America	20	Leona Lewis (s.)	
Unknown tour title	Summer 2020	Unknown	North America	Unknown	Adam Lambert	

== Promotional tours ==
Title	Dates	Associated album(s)	Location	Shows	Attendance	Ref.
EU / UK Summer Series	June 25, 2022– August 6, 2022	Aguilera	Europe	8	125,000	
EU / UK Summer Series set list: 1. "Dirrty; 2. "Can't Hold Us Down"; 3. "Bionic"; 4. "Vanity"; 5. ”Genie In a Bottle”; 6. "What a Girl Wants"; 7. "Ya Llegué"; 8. "Santo"; 9. "Suéltame"; 10. "Como Yo"; 11. "Pa Mis Muchachas"; 12. "Feel This Moment"; 13. "Cristina" / "Desnudate" / "Tití Me Preguntó" / "Pepas"; 14. "Ain't No Other Man"; 15. "Say Something"; 16. "Show Me How You Burlesque"; 17. "Express"; 18. "Lady Marmalade"; 19. "Beautiful"; 20. "Fighter"; 21. "Let There Be Love"

== Concert residencies ==
Title	Dates	Venue	Location	Shows	Gross	Gross adj. in 2025	Attendance	Ref.
Christina Aguilera: The Xperience	May 31, 2019– March 7, 2020	Zappos Theater at Planet Hollywood	Las Vegas, Nevada, U.S.	24	$10.2 million	$12,844,592	75,675	
Christina Aguilera: The Xperience set list: 1. "I Feel Love"; 2. "Your Body"; 3. "Bionic"; 4. "Genie in a Bottle"; 5. "Reflection"; 6. "Dirrty"; 7. "Vanity" / "Express" / "Lady Marmalade"; 8. "Fall in Line"; 9. "Can't Hold Us Down" / "Boys Wanna Be Her"; 10. "Sick of Sittin'"; 11. "Maria"; 12. "Twice"; 13. "What a Girl Wants" / "Come On Over Baby (All I Want Is You)"; 14. "Ain't No Other Man"; 15. "You Are What You Are (Beautiful)"; 16. "Say Something"; 17. "Glam"; 18. "Candyman" / "I Want Candy"; 19. "Woohoo"; 20. Telepathy; 21. "Accelerate"; 22. "Feel This Moment" / "Desnudate"; 23. "Beautiful"; 24. "Fighter"; Encore: 26. "Let There Be Love"
Christina Aguilera at Voltaire	December 30, 2023– August 31, 2024	Voltaire at The Venetian	Las Vegas, Nevada, U.S.	20				

== Stand-alone concerts ==
Date	Title	Venue	Location	Ref.
December 3, 2000	My Reflection (Note: Also titled Christina Aguilera: My Reflection and My Reflection: Live)	Shrine Auditorium	Los Angeles, California, U.S.	
My Reflection set list: 1. "Reflection"; 2. "Genie in a Bottle"; 3. "Come On Over Baby (All I Want Is You)"; 4. "What a Girl Wants"; 5. "So Emotional"; 6. "I Turn to You"; 7. "At Last"; 8. "Contigo en la Distancia"; 9. "Climb Ev'ry Mountain"; 10. "Falsas Esperanzas"; 11. "All Right Now"; 12. "Merry Christmas Baby"; 13. "Have Yourself a Merry Little Christmas"; 14. "Christmas Time"
July 20, 2006	Back to Basics in London	KOKO	London, England	
Back to Basics in London set list: 1. "Ain't No Other Man"; 2. "Understand"; 3. "Candyman"; 4. "Lady Marmalade"; 5. "Oh Mother"; 6. "Beautiful; 7. "Slow Down Baby"
May 5, 2010	VH1 Storytellers	VH1 Studios	New York City, New York, U.S.	
VH1 Storytellers set list: 1. "Bionic"; 2. "Not Myself Tonight"; 3. "Stripped Intro"; 4. "Dirrty"; 5. "Beautiful"; 6. "I'm OK"; 7. "Intro (Back to Basics)"; 8. "Ain't No Other Man"; 9. "Genie in a Bottle"; 10. "What a Girl Wants"; 11. "You Lost Me"; 12. "Fighter"
April 28, 2018	2018 Formula One World Championship	Baku Crystal Hall	Baku, Azerbaijan	
2018 Formula One World Championship set list: 1. "Dirrty"; 2. "Genie in a Bottle"; 3. "Can't Hold Us Down"; 4. "The Voice Within"; 5. "Intro (Back to Basics)"; 6. "Ain't No Other Man"; 7. "Candyman"; 8. "Express"; 9. "Lady Marmalade"; 10. "Say Something"; 11. "Keep On Singin' My Song"; 12. "Feel This Moment"; 13. "Moves Like Jagger"; 14. "Let There Be Love"; 15. "Beautiful"; 16. "Fighter"
January 31, 2019	Christina Aguilera: The Xperience promotional concert	iHeartRadio Theater	Los Angeles, California, U.S.	
Christina Aguilera: The Xperience promotional concert set list: 1. "Genie in a Bottle"; 2. "Beautiful"; 3. "Fighter"
July 16, 2021– July 17, 2021	Christina Aguilera with the LA Phil	Hollywood Bowl	Los Angeles, California, U.S.	
Christina Aguilera with the LA Phil set list: 1. "At Last" / "Ain't No Other Man"; 2. "Genie In a Bottle"; 3. "The Voice Within"; 4. "Peaches" / "Can't Hold Us Down"; 5. "Maria"; 6. "Twice"; 7. "Say Something"; 8. "Dirrty"; 9. "Express / "Lady Marmalade"; 10. "Contigo en la Distancia"; 11. "What a Girl Wants"; 12. "It's a Man's Man's Man's World"; 13. "Fighter"; Encore: 14. "Beautiful"
October 6, 2022	Citi / AAdvantage Presents: Christina Aguilera	Hollywood Palladium	Los Angeles, California, U.S.	
Citi / AAdvantage Presents: Christina Aguilera set list: 1. "Dirrty; 2. "Can't Hold Us Down"; 3. "Bionic"; 4. "Vanity"; 5. "Genie In a Bottle"; 6. "What a Girl Wants"; 7. "Ya Llegué"; 8. "Santo"; 9. "Suéltame"; 10. "Como Yo"; 11. "Pa Mis Muchachas"; 12. "Feel This Moment"; 13. "Cristina" / "Desnudate" / "Tití Me Preguntó" / "Pepas"; 14. "Ain't No Other Man"; 15. "Say Something"; 16. "Show Me How You Burlesque"; 17. "Express"; 18. "Lady Marmalade"; 19. "Beautiful"; 20. "Fighter"; 21. "Let There Be Love"
February 25, 2023– February 26, 2023	Christina Aguilera Live in Chile	Movistar Arena	Santiago, Chile	
Christina Aguilera Live in Chile set list: 1. "Dirrty; 2. "Can't Hold Us Down"; 3. "Bionic"; 4. "Vanity"; 5. "Genie In a Bottle"; 6. "What a Girl Wants"; 7. "Ya Llegué"; 8. "Santo"; 9. "Falsas Esperanzas"; 10. "Pero Me Acuerdo de Ti"; 11. "Como Yo"; 12. "Pa Mis Muchachas"; 13. "Feel This Moment" / "Desnudate"; 14. "Tití Me Preguntó" / "Pepas"; 15. "Ain't No Other Man"; 16. "Moves like Jagger"; 17. "Say Something"; 18. "Show Me How You Burlesque"; 19. "Express"; 20. "Lady Marmalade"; 21. "Beautiful"; 22. "Fighter"; 23. "Let There Be Love"
August 10, 2023	Christina Aguilera Live in Israel	Live Park	Rishon Lezion, Israel	
Christina Aguilera Live in Israel set list: 1. "Stripped Intro / Stripped Pt. 2"; 2. "Dirrty; 3. "Can't Hold Us Down"; 4. "Tell Me (Diddy song)" 5. "Genie In a Bottle"; 6. "Hurt" with Eden Ben Zaken; 7. "What a Girl Wants"; 8. "Santo"; 9. "Feel This Moment" / "Desnudate"; 1. "Bionic"; 2. "Vanity"; 3. "Moves like Jagger"; 4. "Ain't No Other Man"; 5. "Candyman"; 6. "Say Something"; 7. "Express"; 8. "Lady Marmalade"; 9. "Beautiful"; 10. "Fighter"; 11. "Let There Be Love"
September 16, 2023	Christina Aguilera Live in Malta	Fosos Square, il-Fosos, Pjazza San Publju, Pjazza San Publju - il-Fosos, St. Publius Square (The Granaries)	Floriana, Malta	
Christina Aguilera Live in Malta set list: 1. "Stripped Intro / Stripped Pt. 2"; 2. "Dirrty; 3. "Can't Hold Us Down"; 4. "Tell Me (Diddy song)" 5. "Genie In a Bottle"; 6. "What a Girl Wants"; 7. "Santo"; 8. "Feel This Moment" / "Desnudate"; 1. "Bionic"; 2. "Vanity"; 3. "Moves like Jagger"; 4. "Ain't No Other Man"; 5. "Candyman"; 6. "Say Something"; 7. "Express"; 8. "Lady Marmalade"; 9. "Beautiful"; 10. "Fighter"; 11. "Let There Be Love"
November 24, 2023	Christina Aguilera Live in Melbourne	Flemington Racecourse	Melbourne, Australia	
Christina Aguilera Live in Melbourne set list: 1. "Stripped Intro / Stripped Pt. 2"; 2. "Dirrty; 3. "Can't Hold Us Down"; 4. "Tell Me (Diddy song)" 5. "Genie In a Bottle"; 6. "What a Girl Wants"; 7. "Santo"; 8. "Feel This Moment" / "Desnudate"; 1. "Bionic"; 2. "Vanity"; 3. "Moves like Jagger"; 4. "Ain't No Other Man"; 5. "Candyman"; 6. "Say Something"; 7. "Express"; 8. "Lady Marmalade"; 9. "Beautiful"; 10. "Fighter"; 11. "Let There Be Love"

== Opening act ==
Title	Dates	Artist	Location	Shows	Gross	Gross adj. in 2025	Attendance	Ref.
FanMail Tour	January 3, 2000 – January 29, 2000	TLC	North America	13	—	—	—	[44]

== Benefit concerts ==
Date	Event	Location	Performed song(s)	Ref.
September 8, 2006	Fashion Rocks	New York City, New York, U.S.	"Candyman"; "Bennie and the Jets" (with Elton John)	
February 10, 2007	Clive Davis' Pre-Grammy Awards Party	Los Angeles, California, U.S.	"Makes Me Wanna Pray"; "Candyman"	
January 22, 2010	Hope for Haiti Now	Los Angeles, California, U.S.	"Lift Me Up"	
October 23, 2010	Justin Timberlake's all-star benefit concert	Las Vegas, Nevada, U.S.	"Not Myself Tonight"; "Ain't No Other Man"; "Beautiful"; "Fighter"	
August 15, 2015	Apollo in the Hamptons 2015: A Night of Legends	East Hampton, New York, U.S.	"At Last; "Ain't No Other Man"; "Moves Like Jagger"; "Lady Marmalade"	
June 6, 2016	Hillary Clinton: She's with Us	Los Angeles, California, U.S.	"Ain't No Other Man"; "Whole Lotta Love"; Say Something"; "Fighter"	
June 9, 2018	Genentech Gives Back benefit concert	San Francisco, California, U.S.	"Twice"; "Fall In Line"; "Accelerate"	
February 7, 2021	The Verizon Big Concert for Small Business	—N/a	"Beautiful"; "Pero Me Acuerdo De Ti"	
December 1, 2021	World AIDS Day Concert LA Revival	Los Angeles, California, U.S.	"Dirrty"; "Ain't No Other Man"; "The Voice Within"; "Lady Marmalade" (contains elements of "Express); "Somos Nada"; "Pa Mis Muchachas"; "Feel This Moment"	
October 21, 2026	Super Graphic Spectacular benefit concert	Los Angeles, California, U.S.	"Beautiful"; "Coffee" (with Chappell Roan)	

== Music festivals ==
Date	Event	Location	Performed song(s)	Ref.
October 16, 1999	Pepsi Pop Festival	Rotterdam, Netherlands	"Genie in a Bottle"	[77]
May 19, 2000	Tulip Time Festival	Holland, Michigan, U.S.	"Genie in a Bottle"; "Somebody's Somebody"; "So Emotional"; "Ven Conmigo (Solamente Tú)"; "I Turn to You"; "When You Put Your Hands On Me"; "Contigo en la Distancia"; "All Right Now"; "Love For All Seasons"; "At Last"; "Come On Over Baby (All I Want Is You)" (contains elements of "Got to Be Real"); What a Girl Wants"	
May 28, 2000	Kiss 95.1's Kiss Music Mania	Charlotte, North Carolina, U.S.	"Genie in a Bottle"; "Somebody's Somebody"; "So Emotional"; "Ven Conmigo (Solamente Tú)"; "I Turn to You"; "When You Put Your Hands On Me"; "Contigo en la Distancia"; "All Right Now"; "Love For All Seasons"; "At Last"; "Come On Over Baby (All I Want Is You)" (contains elements of "Got to Be Real"); What a Girl Wants"	
June 2, 2000	Z100 Zootopia	Uniondale, New York, U.S.	"Genie in a Bottle"; "Somebody's Somebody"; "So Emotional"; "Ven Conmigo (Solamente Tú)"; "I Turn to You"; "When You Put Your Hands On Me"; "Contigo en la Distancia"; "All Right Now"; "Love For All Seasons"; "At Last"; "Come On Over Baby (All I Want Is You)" (contains elements of "Got to Be Real"); What a Girl Wants"	
June 3, 2000	Kiss 108's Kiss Concert	Mansfield, Massachusetts, U.S.	"Genie in a Bottle"; "Somebody's Somebody"; "So Emotional"; "Ven Conmigo (Solamente Tú)"; "I Turn to You"; "When You Put Your Hands On Me"; "Contigo en la Distancia"; "All Right Now"; "Love For All Seasons"; "At Last"; "Come On Over Baby (All I Want Is You)" (contains elements of "Got to Be Real"); What a Girl Wants"	
June 4, 2000	Q 102 Concert	Camden, New Jersey, U.S.	"Genie in a Bottle"; "Somebody's Somebody"; "So Emotional"; "Ven Conmigo (Solamente Tú)"; "I Turn to You"; "When You Put Your Hands On Me"; "Contigo en la Distancia"; "All Right Now"; "Love For All Seasons"; "At Last"; "Come On Over Baby (All I Want Is You)" (contains elements of "Got to Be Real"); What a Girl Wants"	
July 1, 2000	Summerfest	Milwaukee, Wisconsin, U.S.	"Genie in a Bottle"; "Somebody's Somebody"; "So Emotional"; "Ven Conmigo (Solamente Tú)"; "I Turn to You"; "When You Put Your Hands On Me"; "Contigo en la Distancia"; "All Right Now"; "Love For All Seasons"; "At Last"; "Come On Over Baby (All I Want Is You)" (contains elements of "Got to Be Real"); What a Girl Wants"	
January 20, 2001	Caracas Pop Festival	Caracas, Venezuela	"Arabic dance intro"; "Genio Atrapado"; "Somebody's Somebody"; "So Emotional"; "Falsas Esperanzas"; "When You Put Your Hands On Me"; "Por Siempre Tú"; "Contigo en la Distancia"; "Cuando No Es Contigo"; "Pero Me Acuerdo De Ti"; "Ven Conmigo (Solamente Tú)"; "Una Mujer"	
March 4, 2006	Sanremo Music Festival 2006	Sanremo, Italy	"Somos Novios (It's Impossible)" (with Andrea Bocelli)	
May 29, 2016	15th edition of Mawazine Festival (Note: Aguilera's performance at the 15th Mawazine Festival was attended by 250,000 people, setting a new record.)	Rabat, Morocco	"Intro"; "Bionic"; "Not Myself Tonight"; "Dirrty"; "Genie in a Bottle"; "The Voice Within"; "Interlude"; "Ain't No Other Man"; "Canydman; "Express interlude"; "Lady Marmalade"; "Come On Over Baby (All I Want Is You)"; "I Am interlude"; "Blank Page"; "Say Something"; "Whole Lotta Love"; "Let's Go Crazy"; "Purple Rain"; "Feel This Moment" / "Moves like Jagger"; "Let There Be Love"; "Stripped Intro"; "Beautiful"; "Fighter"	
June 10, 2018	Los Angeles Pride	Los Angeles, California, U.S.	"Accelerate" (remix)	
September 1, 2018	Curaçao North Sea Jazz Festival	Willemstad, Curaçao	"Dirrty"; "Genie in a Bottle"; "Can't Hold Us Down"; "Ain't No Way"; "At Last"; "Fall in Line"; "Ain't No Other Man"; "Candyman"; "Lady Marmalade"; "Say Something"; "Let There Be Love"; "Feel This Moment"; "Beautiful"; "Fighter"	
September 11, 2021	LadyLand	New York City, New York, U.S.	"Intro"; "Your Body" (Martin Garrix remix); "Genie in a Bottle"; "Interlude" (contains elements of "Not Myself Tonight, "Bobblehead", "What a Girl Wants", and "Show Me How You Burlesque"); "Dirrty"; "Vanity"; "Express"; "Lady Marmalade"; "Interlude" (contains elements of "Glam" and "Nails, Hair, Hips, Heels"); "Ain't No Other Man"; "Candyman"; "Woohoo"; "Accelerate" remix; "Feel This Moment" / "Cristina" / "Desnudate" / "Pepas"; "Can't Hold Us Down" (contains elements of "Boys Wanna Be Her"); "Fighter"; "Beautiful"; "Let There Be Love"	
June 11, 2022	Los Angeles Pride	Los Angeles, California, U.S.	"Dirrty"; "Can't Hold Us Down"; "Fighter"; "Fall In Line (Interlude); "Bionic"; "Vanity"; "They Wanna Fuck" (performed by Kim Petras); "XXX" (performed with Kim Petras); "Show Me How You Burlesque" (Interlude); "Express"; "Lady Marmalade" (with Mya); DJ set / "Stars Are Blind" (performed by Paris Hilton); "Feel This Moment" / "Cristina"; "Car Wash"; "Beautiful"; "Let There Be Love"	
June 25, 2022	Mallorca Live	Mallorca, Spain	"Dirrty; "Can't Hold Us Down"; "Bionic"; "Vanity"; "Genie In a Bottle"; "What a Girl Wants"; "Ya Llegué"; "Santo"; "Suéltame"; "Como Yo"; "Pa Mis Muchachas"; "Feel This Moment"; "Cristina" / "Desnudate" / "Tití Me Preguntó" / "Pepas"; "Ain't No Other Man"; "Say Something"; "Show Me How You Burlesque"; "Express"; "Lady Marmalade"; "Beautiful"; "Fighter"; "Let There Be Love"	
July 23, 2022	Cap Roig Festival	Calella de Palafrugell, Spain	"Dirrty; "Can't Hold Us Down"; "Bionic"; "Vanity"; "Genie In a Bottle"; "Ya Llegué"; "Santo"; "Suéltame"; "Como Yo"; "Pa Mis Muchachas"; "Feel This Moment"; "Cristina" / "Desnudate" / "Tití Me Preguntó" / "Pepas"; "Ain't No Other Man"; "Show Me How You Burlesque"; "Express"; "Lady Marmalade"; "Beautiful"; "Fighter"; "Let There Be Love"	
July 25, 2022	Starlite Festival	Marbella, Spain	"Dirrty; "Can't Hold Us Down"; "Bionic"; "Vanity"; "Genie In a Bottle"; "What a Girl Wants"; "Ya Llegué"; "Santo"; "Suéltame"; "Como Yo"; "Pa Mis Muchachas"; "Feel This Moment"; "Cristina" / "Desnudate" / "Tití Me Preguntó" / "Pepas"; "Ain't No Other Man"; "Say Something"; "Show Me How You Burlesque"; "Express"; "Lady Marmalade"; "Beautiful"; "Fighter"; "Let There Be Love"	
July 29, 2022	Monte Carlo Summer Festival	Monte Carlo, Monaco	"Dirrty; "Can't Hold Us Down"; "Bionic"; "Vanity"; "Genie In a Bottle"; "What a Girl Wants"; "Ya Llegué"; "Santo"; "Suéltame"; "Como Yo"; "Pa Mis Muchachas"; "Feel This Moment"; "Cristina" / "Desnudate" / "Tití Me Preguntó" / "Pepas"; "Ain't No Other Man"; "Say Something"; "Show Me How You Burlesque"; "Express"; "Lady Marmalade"; "Beautiful"; "Fighter"; "Let There Be Love"	
August 6, 2022	Brighton Pride	Brighton and Hove, England	"Dirrty; "Can't Hold Us Down"; "Bionic"; "Vanity"; "Genie In a Bottle"; "What a Girl Wants"; "Ya Llegué"; "Santo"; "Suéltame"; "Como Yo"; "Pa Mis Muchachas"; "Feel This Moment"; "Cristina" / "Desnudate" / "Tití Me Preguntó" / "Pepas"; "Ain't No Other Man"; "Candyman; "Moves Like Jagger"; "Say Something"; "Show Me How You Burlesque"; "Express"; "Lady Marmalade"; "Beautiful"; "Fighter"; "Let There Be Love"	
February 23, 2023	Viña del Mar International Song Festival	Viña del Mar, Chile	"Dirrty; "Can't Hold Us Down"; "Bionic"; "Vanity"; "Genie In a Bottle"; "What a Girl Wants"; "Ya Llegué"; "Santo"; "Falsas Esperanzas"; "Pero Me Acuerdo de Ti"; "Pa Mis Muchachas"; "Feel This Moment" / "Desnudate"; "Tití Me Preguntó" / "Pepas"; "Ain't No Other Man"; "Show Me How You Burlesque"; "Express"; "Lady Marmalade"; "Beautiful"; "Fighter"; "Let There Be Love"	
May 6, 2023	Usher's Lovers and Friends Fest	Las Vegas, Nevada, U.S.	"Stripped Intro" / "Stripped Pt. 2"; "Dirrty" with Redman; "Can't Hold Us Down"; "Genie In a Bottle"; "Tell Me"; "What a Girl Wants"; "Ain't No Other Man"; "Lady Marmalade" with Lil' Kim; "Beautiful"	
June 23, 2023	Pride Live	New York City, New York, U.S.	Your Body, Dirrty, Can't Hold Us Down, Genie In A Bottle, What A Girl Wants, Ain't No Other Man, Say Something, Lady Marmalade, Beautiful, Fighter (new version), Let There Be Love	
August 5, 2023	Smukfest	Skanderborg, Denmark	"Stripped Intro" / "Stripped Pt. 2"; "Dirrty" with Redman; "Can't Hold Us Down"; "Tell Me"; "Bionic; "Vanity"; "Genie In a Bottle"; "What a Girl Wants"; "Santo"; "Feel This Moment / Desnudate"; "Ain't No Other Man"; "Moves Like Jagger"; "Say Something"; "Express"; "Lady Marmalade"; "Beautiful"; "Fighter"; "Let There Be Love"	
TBA (Note: Aguilera was announced as a performer at the HAYA Festival, held at the Hrazdan Stadium in Yerevan, Armenia. The show alternately titled Christina Aguilera Live in Armenia, was originally scheduled to be held on October 22, 2022, but following the September 2022 Armenia–Azerbaijan clashes, the show has been postponed.)	HAYA Festival	Yerevan, Armenia		

== See also ==
- Christina Aguilera discography
- Christina Aguilera videography
- List of Christina Aguilera concert tours
- List of songs recorded by Christina Aguilera
