= The Voice Within =

2003 single by Christina Aguilera

Single by Christina Aguilera

from the album Stripped
- B-side: "I'm OK"
- Released: October 27, 2003
- Recorded: 2002
- Studio: The Record Plant (Hollywood); NRG Recording (North Hollywood)
- Length: 4:15 (radio edit); 5:04 (album version)
- Label: RCA
- Songwriters: Christina Aguilera; Glen Ballard
- Producer: Glen Ballard

Christina Aguilera singles chronology
"Can't Hold Us Down" (2003)	"The Voice Within" (2003)	"Car Wash" (2004)

Music video
- "The Voice Within" on YouTube

"The Voice Within" is a song by American singer Christina Aguilera from her fourth studio album, Stripped (2002). The song was written by Aguilera and Glen Ballard, with production handled by Ballard. It is a piano-driven ballad that talks about trusting oneself and one's instincts. "The Voice Within" was released as the fifth and final single from Stripped on October 27, 2003, by RCA Records.

Upon its release, "The Voice Within" received mainly positive reviews from music critics, who called it an inspirational ballad and praised Aguilera's strong vocals on the track, comparing it to Mariah Carey's work. Commercially, "The Voice Within" peaked within the top 10 of charts internationally including Australia, Canada, Switzerland and the United Kingdom. In the United States, the song reached number 33 on the Billboard Hot 100 and number eleven on the Pop Airplay chart.

An accompanying music video for "The Voice Within" was directed by David LaChapelle. It was filmed in black and white as a one shot. The video was nominated for three MTV Video Music Awards at the 2004 ceremony. In support of Stripped, Aguilera performed the track on her two major concert tours: Justified and Stripped Tour (2002–03) and The Stripped Tour (2003). "The Voice Within" has been covered on several television talent shows.

== Background and composition ==
"The Voice Within" (2003)
A 30-second sample of "The Voice Within", a piano-driven ballad which talks about listening to yourself and finding inner strength.

"The Voice Within" was written by Christina Aguilera and Glen Ballard, and was produced by Ballard. The track was recorded by Scott Campbell at The Record Plant in Hollywood, Los Angeles, California and at NRG Recording Studios in North Hollywood, LA, CA, while it was mixed by Peter Mokran. Bass was performed by Mike Elizondo, while Matt Chamberlain played drums. Ballard also played guitar with John Goux, and played keyboards with Randy Kerber. Musically, "The Voice Within" is a piano-driven ballad. Composed in the key of G major, (later the key modulates to A major) it has a moderately slow tempo of 66 beats per minute. Aguilera's vocal range on the track spans from the low-note of D_{3} to the high-note of F♯_{5}. Her vocals on the song were described as strong and powerful by critics. Lyrically, "The Voice Within" is an inspirational song that says that one should trust one's heart and own mind, and find inner strength. The motivational lyrics include, "When there's no-one else, look inside yourself, like your oldest friend, just trust the voice within". As recalled by Aguilera, "I wrote this song when I was 20, 21, and it was a time in my life when you're being pushed and pulled in so many directions." "The Voice Within" was released to US contemporary hit and adult contemporary radio stations on October 27, 2003, as the fifth and final single from Stripped by RCA Records. It was also available for Maxi single sales in stores. Aguilera wanted the Alicia Keys-penned ballad "Impossible" to be the last single from the album, but RCA opted for "The Voice Within".

== Critical reception ==
"The intention was to just write a song that we felt. I sat at my piano and we just made it up as we went along. When the smoke cleared, we had this song called 'The Voice Within.' It's about when you've been abandoned in the real world, there's still this thing inside you that, if you listen to it, it's your best friend."

— Songwriter and producer Glen Ballard on "The Voice Within".

Upon its release, "The Voice Within" received generally favorable reviews from music critics. Chuck Taylor of Billboard praised the "breathtaking and organically flowing" melody, noting that "Aguilera delivers what is perhaps her most assured vocal yet, punching through the clouds and taking her place as a fist-shaking member of the heavenly choir." Taylor also highlighted that the track "is an inspired recording and a showcase for all that this artist can accomplish when she lets the voice precede that offputting image." Josh Kun from Spin labelled it a "swoony Celine-for-teens ballad". Sal Cinquemani for Slant Magazine gave the song a very positive review, naming it an "inspirational" ballad and praised her powerful vocals. CD Universe also praised Aguilera's "rich, throaty style" vocals on the track and compared the song to works by Mariah Carey. Sputnikmusic's critic Amanda Murray commented that the song is "tacky" yet "powerful all the same". Rachel McRady of Wetpaint complimented the song's inspiration melody, declaring that it "basically reduces us to tears every time we hear it". Jason Scott from PopDust called it a "sweeping power-ballad" and praised its inspirational message.

=== Accolades ===
Accolades for "The Voice Within"
Critic/Publication	List	Rank	Ref.
AXS	Top 10 Best Christina Aguilera Songs	6	
Billboard	Christina Aguilera's Top 20 Billboard Hits	18	
The Official Charts Company	Christina Aguilera's Official Top 20 Biggest Selling Singles	16	
PopDust	Christina Aguilera's 10 Best Songs	Ranked	

== Commercial performance ==
On November 29, 2003, "The Voice Within" made it chart debut on the US Billboard Hot 100 chart at number 62, becoming the week's "Hot Shot Debut". On the chart issue dated December 6, 2003, the single jumped to number 57. During the following week, the song rose to number 46. In its fourth week charting, it charted at number 36. Finally, it reached its peak at number 33 on January 10, 2004. The song became Aguilera's eleventh top-forty hit on the chart, and remained on the Hot 100 for a total of 16 weeks. It also charted at number 11 on the Mainstream Top 40 chart, number 16 on the Adult Contemporary chart, and number 33 on the Adult Top 40 chart. The song reached number ten on the Canadian Hot 100 chart. Throughout Europe, "The Voice Within" achieved moderate success on charts, reaching the top ten on many of them. It was also a top-ten song in Australia, peaking at number eight in the country, making the fifth single from the album to reach the top-ten. In Switzerland, "The Voice Within" was Stripped's highest charting-single along with the lead-single "Dirrty", peaking at number three.

== Music video ==
The song's music video was directed by David LaChapelle, who previously directed the music videos for "Dirrty" (2002) and "Can't Hold Us Down" (2003). and produced by Media Magik Entertainment. He explained to MTV News that the video's concept, "There's all kinds of connotations to the word 'stripped.' I wanted to strip it down to one take. Just her and this incredible voice. And really not have anything that is going to overshadow that. She's trying to grow as an artist and along the way she's taking all kinds of risks and a lot of times people let those things overshadow her ability and her talent. I wanted to bring it all back as a sort of bookend to this album". The video begins with a close-up scene of Aguilera and zooms out to her wearing a slip and sitting in an abandoned prop room. In one continuous black and white shot, Aguilera walks through several rooms, exits the building, and finally lies down on a light box. The video was filmed at a deserted theater in downtown Los Angeles. It was inspired by neorealist works. The video was nominated for three 2004 MTV Video Music Awards: Best Female Video, Viewer's Choice, and Best Cinematography.

== Live performances ==
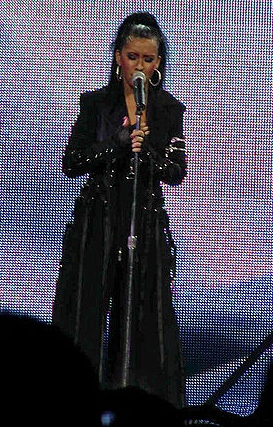
Aguilera performing "The Voice Within" during The Stripped Tour (2003)

Aguilera performed "The Voice Within" for the first time during the Justified & Stripped Tour (2003), a tour held in support of Aguilera's Stripped and Justin Timberlake's album Justified (2002). During the tour's late 2003 extension, The Stripped Tour, the singer also performed the track. The performance is included in the video release Stripped Live in the U.K. (2004). Aguilera promoted the song in France, during her appearance at the M6's television programme Hit Machine. She included the song on her setlist at a concert in Kuala Lumpur in 2014. In 2016, Aguilera also performed the track during her set at the 15th edition of Mawazine Festival.

In July 2021, Aguilera performed the song for two nights at the Hollywood Bowl with Gustavo Dudamel and the Los Angeles Philharmonic. In March 2022, she sang "The Voice Within" during the Expo 2020 concert in Dubai, and in January 2025 she performed it again, at the Joy Awards opening show.

== Legacy and covers ==
Upon release, the song has been called one of Aguilera's best songs. It has been noted as a "powerful ballad about self-discovery and inner strength" and a fan-favourite. PopCrush writer Mike Nied noted that while the defining ballad on Stripped is often "Beautiful", "The Voice Within" "delivers the perfect personal pep talk and serves as a reminder to trust your gut". He added that the song "is every bit as important in Aguilera's discography".

The song has been covered on numerous singing competitions. On October 3, 2005, Roxane LeBrasse covered "The Voice Within" during the top nine show of the third season of Australian singing contest Australian Idol. Despite being well received by judges, she was eliminated that night. On March 28, 2006, Katharine McPhee performed the track live on the 24th show of the fifth season of American Idol, which resulted McPhee as one of the bottom two. Simon Cowell compared McPhee's abilities to those of Aguilera, commenting that her performance was almost as good as the original singer.

== Track listings ==
Canadian CD single
No.	Title	Writer(s)	Length
1.	"The Voice Within" (Radio Edit)	Aguilera; Glen Ballard	4:25
2.	"Fighter" (Freelance Hellraister "Thug Pop" Extended Edit)	Aguilera; Scott Storch	5:11

Mini CD single
No.	Title	Writer(s)	Length
1.	"The Voice Within"	Aguilera; Ballard	5:04
2.	"I'm OK"	Aguilera; Linda Perry	5:18

DVD single
No.	Title	Writer(s)	Length
1.	"The Voice Within" (Album Version)	Aguilera; Ballard	5:04
2.	"Beautiful" (Fug Remix)	Linda Perry	5:47
3.	"The Voice Within" (Video)	Aguilera; Ballard	5:04
4.	"Photo Gallery"

Maxi single
No.	Title	Writer(s)	Length
1.	"The Voice Within" (Album Version)	Aguilera; Ballard	5:04
2.	"The Voice Within" (Radio Edit)	Aguilera; Ballard	4:25
3.	"Beautiful" (Fug Remix)	Perry	5:47
4.	"Can't Hold Us Down" (featuring Lil' Kim) (Da Yard Riddim Mix)	Aguilera; Storch; Matt Morris	4:16

12"
No.	Title	Writer(s)	Length
1.	"The Voice Within" (Album Version)	Aguilera; Ballard	5:04
2.	"Beautiful" (Fug Remix)	Perry	5:47
3.	"Can't Hold Us Down" (featuring Lil' Kim) (Da Yard Riddim Mix)	Aguilera; Storch; Morris	4:16
4.	"Can't Hold Us Down" (featuring Lil' Kim) (Medasyn Mix)	Aguilera; Storch; Morris	4:11

== Credits and personnel ==
Credits are adapted from the liner notes of Stripped. Recording locations

- Recorded at The Record Plant in Hollywood, Los Angeles, California and NRG Recording Studios in North Hollywood, Los Angeles, California

Personnel

- Vocals - Christina Aguilera
- Songwriting – Christina Aguilera, Glen Ballard
- Producing – Glen Ballard
- Recorded – Scott Campbell
- Mixing – Peter Mokran
- Bass – Mike Elizondo
- Drums – Matt Chamberlain
- Guitar – Glen Ballard, John Goux
- Keyboards – Glen Ballard, Randy Kerber

== Charts ==
=== Weekly charts ===
Weekly chart performance for "The Voice Within"
Chart (2003–2004)	Peak position
Australia (ARIA)	8
Austria (Ö3 Austria Top 40)	7
Belgium (Ultratop 50 Flanders)	14
Belgium (Ultratop 50 Wallonia)	40
Canada (Nielsen SoundScan)	10
CIS Airplay (TopHit)	104
Czech Republic (Rádio Top 50)	3
Denmark (Tracklisten)	9
Europe (Eurochart Hot 100)	13
Germany (GfK)	13
Hungary (Rádiós Top 40)	8
Hungary (Single Top 40)	10
Iceland (Íslenski Listinn Topp 20)	19
Ireland (IRMA)	4
Italy (FIMI)	19
Netherlands (Dutch Top 40)	6
Netherlands (Single Top 100)	8
New Zealand (Recorded Music NZ)	16
Norway (VG-lista)	13
Romania (Romanian Top 100)	48
Scottish Singles Sales (Official Charts)	10
Sweden (Sverigetopplistan)	10
Switzerland (Schweizer Hitparade)	3
UK Singles (Official Charts)	9
UK Dance Singles (OCC)	9
US Billboard Hot 100	33
US Adult Contemporary (Billboard)	16
US Adult Pop Airplay (Billboard)	33
US Pop Airplay (Billboard)	11
US Top 40 Tracks (Billboard)	17

=== Year-end charts ===
2003 year-end chart performance for "The Voice Within"
Chart (2003)	Position
Ireland (IRMA)	34
UK Singles (OCC)	195

2004 year-end chart performance for "The Voice Within"
Chart (2004)	Position
Austria (Ö3 Austria Top 40)	37
Switzerland (Schweizer Hitparade)	35
US Adult Contemporary (Billboard)	41
US Mainstream Top 40 (Billboard)	63

== Certifications ==
Certifications for "The Voice Within"
Region	Certification	Certified units/sales
United Kingdom (BPI)	Silver	200,000^{‡}
^{‡} Sales+streaming figures based on certification alone.

== Release history ==
Release dates and formats for "The Voice Within"
Region	Date	Format(s)	Label(s)	Ref.
United States	October 27, 2003	Adult contemporary radio; contemporary hit radio	RCA	
Germany	December 8, 2003	Maxi CD	RCA; BMG	
United Kingdom	December 8, 2003	CD; DVD	RCA; BMG	
Canada	December 9, 2003	CD	RCA; BMG	
