= Like I Do (Christina Aguilera song) =

2018 song by Christina Aguilera

Single by Christina Aguilera featuring GoldLink

from the album Liberation
- Released: June 7, 2018
- Studio: OBE Studios (Hollywood, CA); The Sanctuary (Los Angeles, CA)
- Genre: Hip hop; R&B; house
- Length: 4:49
- Label: RCA
- Songwriters: Christina Aguilera; Brandon P. Anderson; Sang Hyeon Lee; Jonathan Park; Taylor Parks; Whitney Phillips; D'Anthony Carlos
- Producers: Anderson .Paak; BRLLNT (co.); Dumbfoundead (additional producer)

Christina Aguilera singles chronology
"Fall in Line" (2018)	"Like I Do" (2018)	"Haunted Heart" (2019)

GoldLink singles chronology
"Function" (2018)	"Like I Do" (2018)	"Got Friends" (2018)

Lyric video
- "Like I Do" on YouTube

"Like I Do" is a song by American singer Christina Aguilera from her eighth studio album, Liberation (2018). American rapper GoldLink is featured on the song. The track was released as the third single on June 7, 2018. A lyric video for the song was later released on YouTube on June 21, 2018. The single received widespread acclaim from music critics, praised for its sexiness, "slick" production values and Aguilera's "smooth" vocal delivery. It also received a Grammy Award nomination for Best Rap/Sung Performance at the 61st Annual Grammy Awards, held in 2019.

== Composition and recording ==
"Like I Do" is a mid-tempo song that blends elements of hip-hop, R&B, and house music. Its final form was also influenced by genres such as neo soul, synth-pop, and future garage. Music journalists noted that the track belongs to the subgenre of slow jam.

== Critical reception ==
David Smyth of the Evening Standard called the song the "slickest, most appealing production" of its parent album. Jennifer Drysdale (Entertainment Tonight) singled the track out as a "flirty" number while also showcasing "more of a pop sound" for the then upcoming Liberation album. USA Today critic Patrick Ryan also defined the song as a "flirty" track "whose hypnotic high flutes and dexterous guest verse from rapper GoldLink will be lodged in your brain all summer".

Writing for HotNewHipHop, Chantilly Post noted that "Like I Do" sounds "like home for GoldLink as if the song could have been on his previous album At What Cost" while giving the song a "hot" stamp. According to Masani Musa of The Source, the track is noticeable for highlighting Aguilera's "smooth and subtle vocals", while also showcasing the vocalist's "unapologetically belting over an airy flute melody that is seeped in nostalgia". She also refers to the collaboration as "everything we needed". Similarly, Sajae Elder, of Complex, noted the "great opening verse" and claimed the song's "syncopated, summery production [...] gives a sexy nod to love songs on the past". The "sexy" approach was also highlighted by Paris Close, writing for PopCrush, who noted that "no one does sexy like Xtina" adding that "when it comes to performance, she can show you better than she can tell you", while praising the "straight to the point" lyrics at the same time the "flute-tipped instrumentals play in the distance".

Rolling Stone contributor Brittany Spanos highlighted GoldLink's references to Aguilera's earlier songs ("Genie in a Bottle", "Ain't No Other Man"), while considering the song a "self-assured track". Vrinda Jagota of Paper noted Anderson .Paak's production, especially the "whimsical wind instruments and synths", while also praising GoldLink's "slick contribution". Overall, "the song ambles on joyously for almost five minutes, a skittering drum beat and that boisterous flute line flitting throughout", according to the music critic. Pitchfork contributor Claire Lobenfeld chose "Like I Do" as "one spot where contemporary pop fare suits Aguilera" on the Liberation album. The BuzzFeed editor Dylan Nguyen labelled the song as "a modern R&B masterpiece".

On the other hand, The Guardian's Alexis Petridis criticized the track. According to the music critic, "the most interesting thing about Like I Do is how its hook echoes Maroon 5’s 'Moves like Jagger', the biggest hit Aguilera’s been involved with in years". Similarly, Stereogum contributor Chris DeVille called the track a "squelchy, bouncy MILF encounter", while also referring to "Sick of Sittin'" as the "superior option" among the Anderson .Paak productions.

== Lyric video ==
Official lyric video for "Like I Do" was released on Aguilera's YouTube channel on June 21, 2018. The song's lyrics are displayed as the backdrop for scenes of a dancing couple. A man and a woman move in a sensual manner, almost as if engaged in a dance battle, and in other scenes they passionately embrace under a shower of water. The song's lyrics are also shown on old television sets. The video is presented in black and white, and the footage was shot at the Please Space recording studio in Brooklyn, New York. The lyric video was directed by KIT Walters and Turkish-born photographer Ece Gürlü.

== Charts ==
Chart (2018)	Peak position
Indonesian Digital Songs (LIMA)	2

== Release history ==
Region	Date	Format	Label	Ref.
Various	June 7, 2018	Digital download; streaming	RCA	
