= Liberation (Christina Aguilera album) =

Studio album by Christina Aguilera
- Released: June 15, 2018
- Recorded: April 2014 – November 2017
- Studios: OBE (Hollywood, California); The Guesthouse (Hollywood Hills, California); Germano (New York City)
- Genres: R&B; hip-hop
- Length: 49:19
- Label: RCA
- Producers: Christina Aguilera; Anderson .Paak; Mell Beats; Jon Bellion; Nicholas Britell; Raul Cubina; Mike Dean; Kosine; Kirby Lauryen; MNEK; Neenyo; Bryan Nelson; Che Pope; Ricky Reed; Sango; Snaz; Kanye West; Mark Williams

Christina Aguilera chronology
Lotus (2012)	Liberation (2018)	La Fuerza (2022)

Singles from Liberation
- 1. "Accelerate" Released: May 3, 2018; 2. "Fall in Line" Released: May 16, 2018; 3. "Like I Do" Released: June 7, 2018

Liberation is the eighth studio album by American singer-songwriter Christina Aguilera. It was released on June 15, 2018, through RCA Records, marking her last album under the label as she parted ways in 2024. The album is Aguilera's first studio album in six years, following her seventh studio album, Lotus (2012). Aguilera started recording Liberation in April 2014, and throughout 2015 and 2017, she collaborated with a handful of producers and songwriters to reach her desired sound; Pharrell Williams and Linda Perry were in the studio in early stages and ended up not being on the album, while new collaborators such as Anderson .Paak, Kanye West, Che Pope, Mike Dean and Tayla Parx were confirmed to be on the album. It features collaborations with Demi Lovato, Keida, Shenseea, GoldLink, Ty Dolla Sign, 2 Chainz, and Lewis Hamilton under the pseudonym "XNDA".

Liberation was preceded by three singles: "Accelerate", "Fall in Line" and "Like I Do", and a promotional single, "Twice". Critical reception towards the album was generally positive, with music critics complimenting Aguilera's vocals, the album's experimental styles, and the cohesive sound. It positioned within the top ten in nine countries, including the United States, peaking at number six on the Billboard 200 chart. The album also reached number one in Spain, number three in Switzerland, and number five in Canada.

Liberation's second and third singles, "Fall in Line" featuring Demi Lovato and "Like I Do" featuring GoldLink, earned nominations for Best Pop Duo/Group Performance and Best Rap/Sung Performance at the 61st Grammy Awards, respectively. To promote the album, Aguilera embarked on her fifth concert tour, the Liberation Tour, beginning in September 2018. It was her first tour in nearly ten years after the Back to Basics Tour. Liberation was nominated for the International Album of the Year award at the 2018 Gaffa Awards ceremony.

== Background ==
Following the release of her seventh studio album, Lotus (2012), Aguilera took a career hiatus to focus on her family. Later in October 2015, Aguilera confirmed that she was recording two albums: one in English and one in Spanish (which was slated to be her second after 2000's Mi Reflejo). During the interview, she also elaborated on the album's working process, saying: "I've been loosely working and sort of accumulating ideas for what my next album will be over the last couple of years. I'm excited for my fans to finally be getting something from me — it's been a while!" During a promotional interview for the TV show, Aguilera stated about the album: "It will be an album of freedom."

=== Recording and development ===
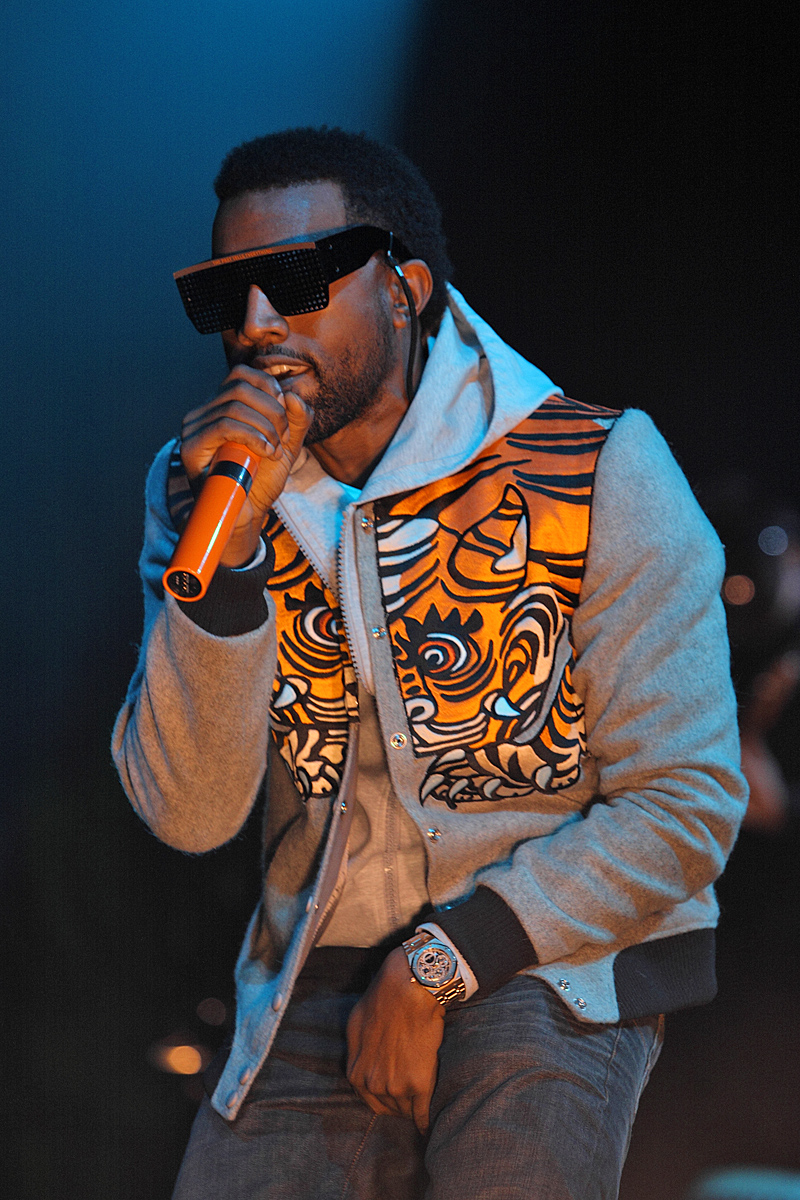
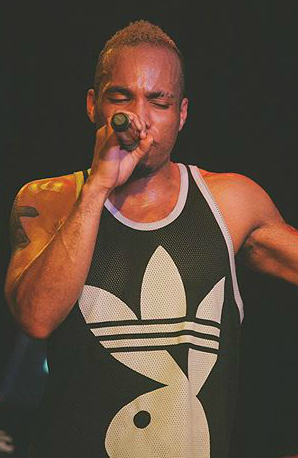
Kanye West (left) and Anderson .Paak (right) produced two tracks each.

Liberation's recording initially took place in early 2014. At early stages, the first producer confirmed to be working with Aguilera was Pharrell Williams, which, according to the singer, had one song that she loved. In 2015, Aguilera confirmed that she was still writing and gathering songs for the album to eventually record them. In late November, Aguilera confirmed she was working again with long time collaborator Linda Perry. In February 2017, Tayla Parx confirmed she had worked with Aguilera, as well as Da Internz, Kanye West and PartyNextDoor. Billboard later revealed that Aguilera met West in Rick Rubin's Shangri La studio in Malibu, California. About West, she commented: "I've always been a huge fan of Kanye. Outside of, you know, his controversial aspects, I just think he's a great artist and musicmaker and beatmaker. The artists that he chooses to pluck from different walks of life are so interesting."

Later in September 2017, Aguilera entered the studio again to work with Mark Ronson and Anderson .Paak. Aguilera also mentioned about working with Paak, which produced two tracks, by saying: "He and I connected big-time. He was like, 'I used to watch you on TRL!' He's a great lyricist, soul singer and rapper. And he murders the drums." In 2018, media reported that Aguilera was collaborating with Demi Lovato in a song co-written by singer and songwriter Julia Michaels. Commenting about choosing Lovato, Aguilera claimed: "We went through a few names of women. I needed a belty singer, and she took it to the next level. I almost cried when I first heard her on the record." Aguilera revealed that, during the album's working process, she regretted not having Cardi B and Childish Gambino on the album; the first "got lost in the shuffle", after being discouraged by a producer to work with her, while the latter was working on the TV series Atlanta and the two never had the time to materialize the collaboration.

It was reported in the media in June 2018 that Formula One driver Lewis Hamilton had performed on the track "Pipe", under the name XNDA. Hamilton did not initially confirm this, but confirmed the rumors in July 2020. In August 2018, Aguilera revealed that she recorded "a lot more" songs during the Liberation studio sessions, and they could end up on her follow-up album.

== Music and lyrics ==
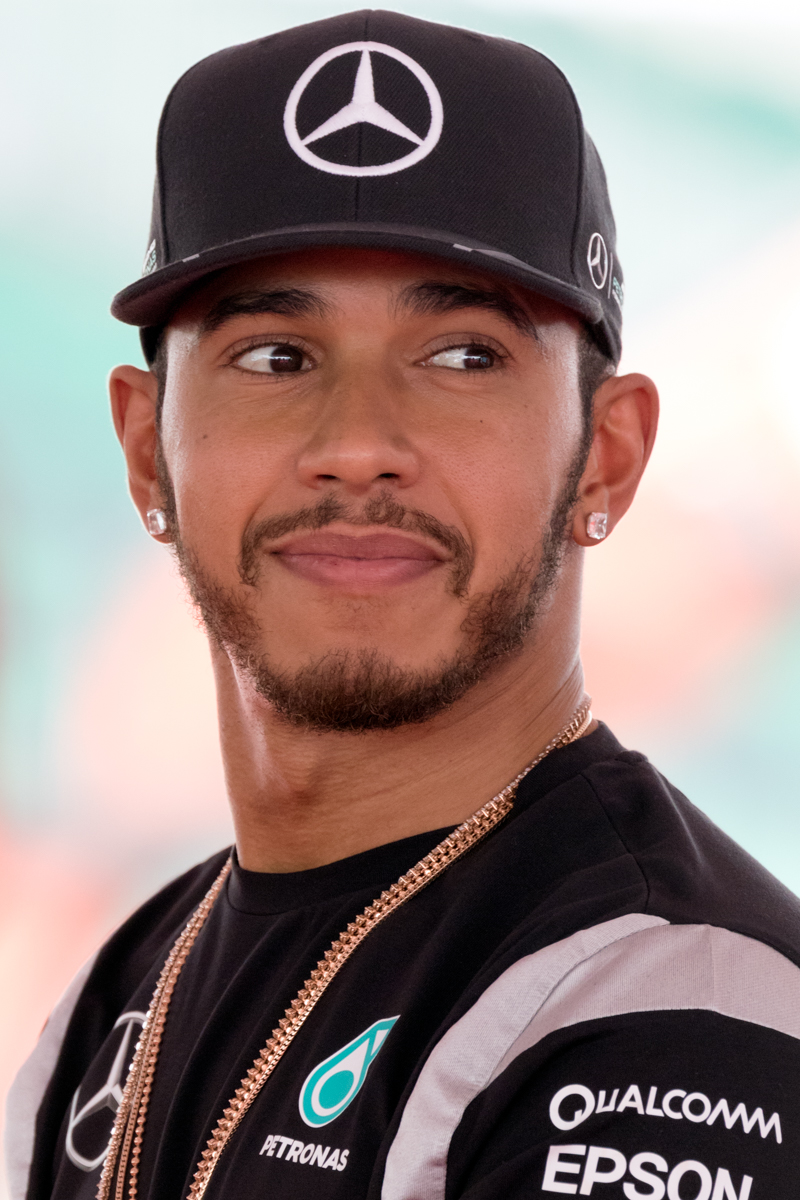
Lewis Hamilton is featured on the R&B song "Pipe", under the pseudonym XNDA.

Liberation is an R&B and hip-hop record, with soul, reggae, trap, Southern rock, and dancehall elements. It was described as a "hip-hop and R&B inspired" album by Billboard. Aguilera commented: "To me, there's nothing like an amazing hip-hop beat," while also claiming: "At the end of the day, I am a soul singer. When you strip back the words 'pop star' and the many things that I've done, singing soulfully is where my core, my root and my heart really is. And as you can see, it's what I'm inspired by." The New York Times's chief critic Jon Pareles noted that on the album Aguilera largely concentrates on such themes as "trauma, lust, resistance, obsession and, finally, lasting love."

The album opens with the eponymous composition, "Liberation", written by Nicholas Britell. We hear the voices of laughing children, the melody has a cinematic quality and is played on the piano. This instrumental prelude, lasting no more than two minutes, emphasizes the essence of freedom and being oneself. Billboard described the third track, "Maria", as "a pulsing, intricately orchestrated piece that includes a Michael Jackson sample and an extended introduction in which Aguilera sings from The Sound of Music." Aguilera commented that the influence behind the title was Julie Andrews' character in the film as well, as her middle name, adding: "Within my house a form of escape for me was opening my bedroom's window and singing out to the world pretending that I was her. It's about getting back to that little girl who just wants to sing for all the right reasons, not necessarily for charting and all the things that this business kind of does to you over the years and shaping how you look at making music." On "Maria", Aguilera adapts a "bluesy lower range" and sings about existential misery.

"Sick of Sittin'" features hard-rock guitar riffs and was inspired by the music of Janis Joplin. The song's lyrics were characterized as "thrillingly acerbic" by The Guardian's Alim Kheraj, and Aguilera explained that they "were born out of feeling stagnant in one place for too long, feeling a little asleep at the wheel. Anytime that you get just too comfortable in a place where you just feel that you're not living up to your full potential it's time to flip the script and move."

The introduction to "Fall in Line", the duet with Lovato, is the track "Dreamers", which "features a group of young girls declaring goals like 'I want to be a journalist,' 'I want to be heard,' 'I want to be president.'" "Fall in Line" has been described as a feminist anthem. Aguilera stated that the track was recorded a few years ago and before movements such as Time's Up and the Me Too movement came out. She added: "It was the song that needed to be heard. Because of what I witnessed when I was growing up I always felt really driven to have a voice that my mom kind of never had in my childhood. So I've always wanted to be that advocate for women and anybody that was struggling to have their own voice."

"Right Movies" is reggae and dancehall-inspired. The track begins with a spoken word verse by an unknown man, but later, in a feminist gesture, it is performed by three female artists (Aguilera, Keida, Shenseea). "Like I Do" is a mid-tempo song that blends elements of hip-hop, R&B, and house music.

== Title and artwork ==
Aguilera explained that Liberation's title was intended to represent "freeing [herself] from anything that wasn't [her] truth", including situations in which she felt "stifled", held back by others' opinions, or "stuck in a stagnant place".

On the May 2018 cover of Paper magazine, Aguilera appeared bare-faced without makeup and retouching, saying: "I'm at the place, even musically, where it's a liberating feeling to be able to strip it all back and appreciate who you are and your raw beauty." The album's black-and-white cover continues this concept; it depicts her with messy, undone hair, freckles, and little to no makeup, which contrasts with the polished styling and heavy makeup of her previous album covers. Refinery29 described the "raw, unfiltered" image as a bold departure and a fresh start for her first album in six years.

== Release and promotion ==
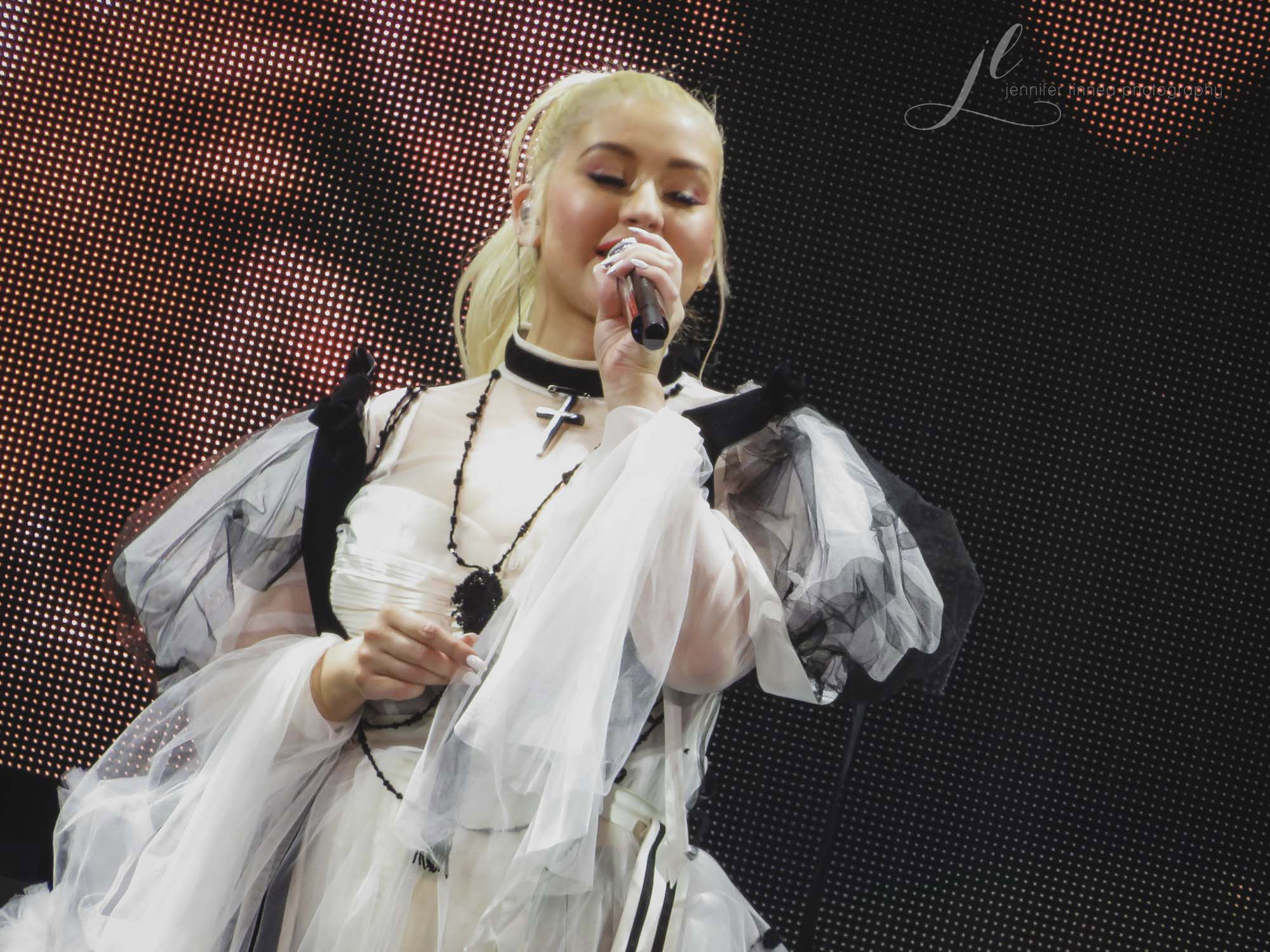
Aguilera performing "Unless It's with You" during The Liberation Tour.

On April 28, 2018, Aguilera had a concert at Formula 1 Azerbaijan Grand Prix where she unveiled a promo video as an intro for the then upcoming album. On May 3, Liberation's title, cover art, tracklist, and release date confirmed to be June 15 was revealed, and a teaser trailer titled Liberation: Where's Maria? was released a day later, in which the singer spoke about her inspiration and the concept of the album. On May 9, Aguilera announced the Liberation Tour in support of the album, her first tour since 2006's Back to Basics Tour.

Aguilera performed "Fall in Line" with Lovato at the 2018 Billboard Music Awards on May 20. Aguilera partnered with Pandora and held an album listening session on May 31 at the Peppermint Club. On June 13, Aguilera made a surprise performance in disguise in a New York City subway alongside Jimmy Fallon, where she performed Aretha Franklin's "Think" and her own "Fighter". The performance was taped and broadcast the next night on The Tonight Show Starring Jimmy Fallon, where she was interviewed and performed and "Fall in Line". The next day, she performed on Today Show and was interviewed on Total Request Live. On September 12, Aguilera was interviewed on Jimmy Kimmel Live!.

Several songs from Liberation made it onto the set list of Aguilera's Las Vegas residency Christina Aguilera: The Xperience (2019–2020). When on a break from the residency, Aguilera embarked on another tour in support of the album, The X Tour, throughout 2019. The X Tour promoted Liberation in Europe and Mexico across 18 dates.

=== Singles ===
"Accelerate" featuring singer Ty Dolla Sign and rapper 2 Chainz was released on May 3, 2018, as the lead single. The music video premiered on Aguilera's Vevo channel on the same day. It reached number-one on the US Dance Club Songs chart for the issue dated September 1, becoming Aguilera's tenth song to do so, as well as Ty Dolla Sign and 2 Chainz's first number-one song. On May 11, "Twice" was released as a promotional single.

"Fall in Line" featuring Lovato was released on May 16, as the second single from Liberation. Its lyric video was uploaded on Aguilera's Vevo channel on the same day, while its music video premiered on May 23. A week prior the album release, on June 7, "Like I Do" featuring rapper GoldLink was released as the third single. The lyric video for the song was released on June 21.

== Critical reception ==
Professional ratings
Aggregate scores
Source	Rating
AnyDecentMusic?	6.6/10
Metacritic	71/100
Review scores
Source	Rating
AllMusic	3.5/5 stars
The Daily Telegraph	3/5 stars
The Guardian	4/5 stars
The Independent	3/5 stars
The New Zealand Herald	4/5 stars
NME	3/5 stars
The Observer	4/5 stars
Pitchfork	6.7/10
Rolling Stone	4/5 stars
Slant Magazine	3/5 stars

Liberation received positive reviews from music critics. According to the review aggregator Metacritic, Liberation received "generally favorable reviews" based on a weighted average score of 71 out of 100 from 17 critic scores. The review aggregator site AnyDecentMusic? compiled 13 reviews and gave the album a weighted average score of 6.6 out of 10, based on their assessment of the critical consensus.

Alim Kheraj from The Observer lauded the album for being "at her most artistically emancipated". Brittany Spanos of Rolling Stone labeled the album "Xtina at her peak" and claimed that Aguilera's "greatest attributes is that she has rarely played it safe". Mesfin Fekadu found the album "masterfully cohesive" in The Washington Post, while comparing it to Mariah Carey's The Emancipation of Mimi, "her 2005 comeback album that reminded the world to never count out the diva". The New York Times critic Jon Pareles complimented the album's experimental styles incorporating various genres and wrote that "[Aguilera's] extravagant vocal flourishes connect with sweeping emotion". HipHopDX writer Trent Clark opined that despite "occasional cheese-smothered lyric", the album featured Aguilera's "heavenly" vocals that was "a well-calculated offering from a living legend whose abilities are still very much intact".

Stephen Thomas Erlewine from AllMusic discussed that while Liberation appeared to be personal, it still "resonate emotionally" despite not being "an easy route". Claire Lobenfeld from Pitchfork, while unimpressed towards the album's "progressive moments" like "Pipe" or "Accelerate", claimed that the album's "sturdy moments" as on "Fall in Line" created "a promising first step toward a genuine pop rebirth—moments" that were comparable to Janet Jackson's The Velvet Rope or Whitney Houston's My Love Is Your Love.

Nick Levine from NME commented that while Liberation "may lack the grand ambition and massive pop bangers of her glory days", the album was "cohesive and surprisingly low-key" that may revitalize Aguilera's career. The Daily Telegraph's Neil McCormick, by contrast, disapproved of the album's music styles incorporating "rock, R&B, soul, hip hop, reggaeton and anthemic balladry" that "never settles into a coherent listening experience". Sal Cinquemani from Slant Magazine shared a similar viewpoint, commenting that the album lacked cohesion by being both "forward-minded" and "frustratingly safe". BuzzFeed editor Dylan Nguyen called it "a throwback to Stripped", and praised its "amazing songwriting" and modern sound.

At the 2018 GAFFA Awards, Liberation was nominated for the International Album of the Year award. It was also nominated for the International Album of the Year at the 2018 Luvpop Awards.

=== Year-end lists ===
Accolades by publication and rank
Publication	Accolade	Rank	Ref.
BuzzFeed	Best R&B Albums of 2018	3	
Cosmopolitan	16 Best Albums of 2018	15	
Gulf News	Best of 2018's music releases (so-far)	10	
NPR	Top 15 Albums of 2018	14	
Ranker	The 25 Best Pop Albums of 2018	1	
Rolling Stone	20 Best Pop Albums of 2018	17	
Rolling Stone	Highest Rated R&B Albums of 2018	7	

== Commercial performance ==
In the United States, Liberation debuted at number six on the Billboard 200 chart, selling 68,000 album-equivalent units (62,000 in album sales), becoming Aguilera's second lowest-peaking and lowest-selling record in the United States. In the second week, it fell 90 positions to 96 with sales of approximately 3,000 copies, a 95% drop compared to the first week. It became Aguilera's seventh top 10 album in the nation, and was the highest ranked solo female album on the week ending June 30. Liberation was also the third best-selling album of the week. Furthermore, the release saw Aguilera re-enter and peak at number eight on the Billboard Artist 100 chart. The album spent two weeks on the chart, falling ninety-two spots to number ninety-eight in its second week before leaving the chart in its third week. On the Canadian Albums Chart compiled by Billboard, the record debuted and peaked at number five, becoming her highest-charting album since Bionic and overall, her fifth album that peaks inside the top-five.

Liberation debuted and peaked at number 17 on the UK Albums Chart with sales of 4,834 copies, the week's fifth highest debut, and second highest debut outside the top 10. Prior to this, it reached number eight on the biggest albums of midweek list compiled by the Official Charts Company. In Australia, the album debuted at number 9 on the Australian Albums Chart, becoming her fourth top 10 album and earning her highest charting studio effort since Bionic. It also charted at number five on the Australian Digital Albums chart and at number six on the Physical Albums. Elsewhere, it became Aguilera's highest-charting album in Spain, entering the Spanish Albums Chart at number 1. It also became her third top 10 album, following Back to Basics and Bionic. In Switzerland, Liberation debuted and peaked at number three on the Swiss Albums, becoming her fifth consecutive top 10 album and also spending a total of seven weeks on the chart. In Austria, it entered the Austrian Albums at number nine, her highest-charting album since Bionic. Subsequently, Liberation stayed on the chart for a total of three weeks. In France, it reached number three on SNEP's Digital Albums chart.

== Track listing ==
Liberation track listing
No.	Title	Writer(s)	Producer(s)	Length
1.	"Liberation"	Nicholas Britell	Britell	1:47
2.	"Searching for Maria"	Richard Rodgers; Oscar Hammerstein II		0:25
3.	"Maria"	Christina Aguilera; Kanye West; Ross Birchard; Ilsey Juber; Jahron Brathwaite; Tayla Parx; Che Pope; Noah Goldstein; Lawrence Brown; Linda Glover; Horgay Gordy; Allen Story	West; Pope; Hudson Mohawke^{[a]}; Goldstein^{[a]}	4:34
4.	"Sick of Sittin'"	Aguilera; Brandon P. Anderson; Melvin Henderson; Whitney Phillips; Janne Schaffer	Anderson .Paak; Mell Beats	4:00
5.	"Dreamers"			0:36
6.	"Fall in Line" (featuring Demi Lovato)	Aguilera; Jon Bellion; Audra Mae; Mark Williams; Raul Cubina; Jonny Simpson	GSP; Williams^{[a]}; Cubina^{[a]}; Lovato^{[c]}; Mitch Allan^{[c]}	4:06
7.	"Right Moves" (featuring Keida and Shenseea)	Aguilera; Makeida Beckford; Chinsea Lee; Julia Michaels; Justin Tranter; Parx; Bryan Nelson; Marcos "Kosine" Palacios	Nelson; Kosine; Pope^{[a]}	3:48
8.	"Like I Do" (featuring GoldLink)	Aguilera; D'Anthony Carlos; Parx; Phillips; Anderson; Sang Hyeon Lee; Jonathan Park	Paak; BRLLNT^{[a]}; Dumbfoundead^{[b]}	4:49
9.	"Deserve"	Michaels; Uzoechi Emenike	MNEK	4:23
10.	"Twice"	Kirby Lauryen	Lauryen; Sandy Chila^{[b]}	4:02
11.	"I Don't Need It Anymore (Interlude)"	Aguilera	Aguilera	0:54
12.	"Accelerate" (featuring Ty Dolla Sign and 2 Chainz)	Aguilera; Tyrone Griffin; Tauheed Epps; West; Pope; Mike Dean; Ernest Brown; Carlton Mays, Jr.; Bibi Bourelly; Juber; Parx; Lauryen; Ronald Brown	West; Pope; Dean; Charlie Heat^{[a]}; Da Honorable C.N.O.T.E.^{[a]}; Eric Danchick^{[b]}; Goldstein^{[b]}	4:03
13.	"Pipe" (featuring XNDA)	Aguilera; Lewis Hamilton; Kai Wright; Sean Seaton; Pope; Rene Hill; Parx	Sango; Neenyo; Pope	4:05
14.	"Masochist"	Aguilera; Tim Anderson; Darhyl "Hey DJ" Camper Jr.; Juber	Camper; T. Anderson	3:30
15.	"Unless It's with You"	Aguilera; Eric Frederic; Teddy Geiger; Tom Peyton; Erik Hassle; Gamal "LunchMoney" Lewis	Ricky Reed	4:17
Total length:				49:19

=== Notes ===
- ^{^[a]} signifies a co-producer.
- ^{^[b]} signifies an additional producer.
- ^{^[c]} signifies a vocal producer for Demi Lovato.

=== Sampling credits ===
- "Maria" contains a sample of "Maria (You Were the Only One)", written by Lawrence Brown, Linda Glover, Horgay Gordy and Allen Story, as performed by Michael Jackson.
- "Sick of Sittin'" contains a sample of "No Registration", written and performed by Janne Schaffer.
- "Accelerate" contains a sample of "I Like Funky Music" by Uncle Louie, and "I Feel So Good Inside", written by Ronald Brown, as performed by The Techniques IV.

== Credits and personnel ==
Credits were adapted from the liner notes.

=== Locations ===
- The Sanctuary; Los Angeles, California (vocals engineering: track 2–4, 6–15)
- OBE Studios; Hollywood, California (recording: track 4, 8)
- The Guesthouse; Hollywood Hills, California (recording: track 6)
- Major Tom's; London, United Kingdom (engineering: track 9)
- Germano Studios; New York City (XDNA vocals recording: track 13)
- Werewolf Heart Studios; Whitley Heights California (engineering: track 14)
- EastWest Studios; Los Angeles, California (engineering: track 15)
- Larrabee Studios; North Hollywood, California (mixing)
- The Mastering Palace; New York City (mastering)

=== Performers and musicians ===
- Christina Aguilera – vocals (all tracks)
- Demi Lovato – vocals (track 6)
- Keida – vocals, additional vocals (track 7)
- Shenseea – vocals, additional vocals (track 7)
- GoldLink – vocals (track 8)
- Ty Dolla $ign – vocals (track 12)
- 2 Chainz – vocals (track 12)
- XNDA – vocals (track 13)
- Ilsey Juber – background vocals (tracks 3, 14)
- Anderson .Paak – background vocals (tracks 4, 11)
- Jon Bellion – background vocals (track 6)
- Audra Mae – background vocals, additional vocals (track 6)
- Tayla Parx – background vocals (tracks 7, 13)
- Lauren Evans – background vocals (track 15)
- Elizabeth Komba – background vocals (track 15)
- MNEK – additional vocals (track 9)
- Kirby Lauryen – additional vocals (track 12)
- Nicholas Britell – piano (track 1), strings arranger (track 3)
- Tim Fain – violin (track 1)
- Rob Moose – violin (track 3), viola (tracks 1, 3), octave bass viola (track 3)
- Jairus "J MO" Mozee – guitar (track 4)
- Ryan Svendsen – trumpet & flugelhorn (track 6)
- Bryan "Composer" Nelson – all instruments (track 7)
- Darhyl "Hey DJ" Camper Jr – all instruments (track 14)
- Tim Anderson – all instruments (track 14)
- Ricky Reed – guitar (track 15)
- Carlitos del Puetro – bass (track 15)
- Vinnie Colaiuta – drums (track 15)
- Rogét Chahayed – piano (track 15)

=== Production ===
- Christina Aguilera – executive production, production (track 11)
- Nicholas Britell – production (track 1)
- Kanye West – production (tracks 3, 12)
- Che Pope – production (tracks 3, 12, 13), co-production (track 7)
- Hudson Mohawke – co-production (track 3)
- Noah Goldstein – co-production (track 3), additional production (track 12)
- Anderson .Paak – production (tracks 4, 8)
- Mell Beats – production (track 4)
- Jon Bellion – production (track 6)
- Mark Williams – co-production (track 6)
- Raul Cubina – co-production (track 6)
- Mitch Allan – vocal production for Demi Lovato (track 6)
- Bryan "Composer" Nelson – production (track 7)
- Kosine – production (track 7)
- BRLLNT – co-production (track 8)
- Dumbfoundead – additional production (track 8)
- MNEK – production (track 9)
- Kirby Lauryen – production (track 10)
- Sandy Chila – additional production (track 10)
- Mike Dean – production (track 12)
- Charlie Heat – co-production (track 12)
- Da Honorable C.N.O.T.E. – co-production (track 12)
- Eric Danchick – additional production (track 12)
- Sango – production (track 13)
- Neenyo – production (track 13)
- Darhyl "Hey DJ" Camper Jr – production (track 14)
- Tim Anderson – production (track 14)
- Ricky Reed – production (track 15)

=== Technical ===
- Oscar Ramirez – vocals engineering (tracks 2–4, 7–11, 13–15), Christina Aguilera vocals engineering (tracks 6, 12)
- Noah Goldstein – engineering (tracks 3, 12)
- Jonathan Simpson – recording (track 6)
- Scott Robinson – additional vocal engineering (track 6)
- Bryan "Composer" Nelson – programming (track 7)
- MNEK – engineering (track 9)
- Pro Logic – XNDA vocals recording (track 13)
- Darhyl "Hey DJ" Camper Jr – programming (track 14)
- Tim Anderson – programming, engineering (track 14)
- Bill Malina – engineering (track 15)

=== Artwork ===
- Brian Roettinger – art direction & design
- Milan Zrnic – photography (cover, back cover, pages 2, 3, 5, 10 and 16)
- Luke Gilford – photography (pages 4, 8–9)
- Lea Colombo – photography (pages 6–7)

== Charts ==
=== Weekly charts ===
Weekly chart performance for Liberation
Chart (2018)	Peak position
Australian Albums (ARIA)	9
Austrian Albums (Ö3 Austria)	9
Belgian Albums (Ultratop Flanders)	13
Belgian Albums (Ultratop Wallonia)	16
Canadian Albums (Billboard)	5
Croatian International Albums (HDU)	5
Czech Albums (ČNS IFPI)	27
Dutch Albums (Album Top 100)	11
French Albums (SNEP)	47
German Albums (Offizielle Top 100)	11
Greek Albums (IFPI Greece)	22
Hungarian Albums (MAHASZ)	19
Irish Albums (Official Charts)	28
Italian Albums (FIMI)	12
Japanese Hot Albums (Billboard)	48
Japanese Albums (Oricon)	48
New Zealand Albums (RMNZ)	23
Polish Albums (ZPAV)	24
Portuguese Albums (AFP)	7
Scottish Albums (Official Charts)	16
Slovak Albums (ČNS IFPI)	24
South Korean Albums (Gaon)	60
South Korean International Albums (Gaon)	1
Spanish Albums (PROMUSICAE)	1
Swedish Albums (Sverigetopplistan)	41
Swiss Albums (Schweizer Hitparade)	3
Swiss Albums (Romandie)	2
UK Albums (Official Charts)	17
US Billboard 200	6

=== Year-end charts ===
2018 year-end chart performance for Liberation
Chart (2018)	Position
US Billboard Top Current Album Sales	112

== Certifications and sales ==
Region	Certification	Certified units/sales
Brazil (Pro-Música Brasil)	Gold	20,000^{‡}
United States	—	100,000
^{‡} Sales+streaming figures based on certification alone.

== Release history ==
List of release dates and formats
Region	Date	Formats	Labels	Ref.
Various	June 15, 2018	CD; digital download	RCA	
Japan	June 27, 2018	CD	Sony Japan	
United States	September 28, 2018	LP	RCA	
