= Twice (song) =

2018 song by Christina Aguilera

Promotional single by Christina Aguilera

from the album Liberation
- Released: May 11, 2018
- Studio: The Sanctuary (Los Angeles, CA)
- Length: 4:02
- Label: RCA
- Songwriter: Kirby Dockery
- Producers: Kirby Dockery; Sandy Chila

"Twice" is a song by American singer Christina Aguilera from her eighth studio album, Liberation (2018). It was released for digital download and streaming on May 11, 2018 by RCA Records as the album's first promotional single. Kirby Lauryen wrote the track and co-produced it with Sandy Chila. Upon its release of, music critics were positive towards the track, praising Aguilera's voice and the lyrics. Commercially, "Twice" reached top-forty positions on the digital charts of Australia and Spain. The song was later included in the setlist for The Liberation Tour, Christina Aguilera: The Xperience, and The X Tour.

== Background and composition ==
"Twice" was solely written by Kirby Lauryen, while co-producing along with Sandy Chila. On May 10, 2018, Aguilera posted a video on her Twitter account in which she teased the release of a song from her then-upcoming eight studio album, Liberation (2018), stating that she loves the song's "raw vocal quality" and the "spiritual emotion and tone" it conveys. The track was released for digital download and streaming as the first promotional single from Liberation on May 11, 2018 by RCA Records. Musically, "Twice" has been described as a soulful ballad with a length of four minutes and two seconds. According to the sheet music published at Musicnotes.com by Sony/ATV Music Publishing, the song is performed in the key of F♯ Minor with a moderately slow tempo of 75 beats per minute. Aguilera's vocals span from E_{3} to F_{5}.

== Critical reception ==
Jon Pareles from New York Times said that "Twice" "mournfully ponders sin, forgiveness and redemption". Nicholas Hautman of Us Weekly stated that "Twice" is Aguilera's best song since "Hurt", noting its "contemplative and stripped-down nature". Neil McCormick from The Daily Telegraph considered that Aguilera sounded "like a one-woman Fleetwood Mac" and praised "her rich low notes fluttering effortlessly up to falsetto with no loss of control". During a review for Liberation for PopCrush, Bobby Olivier called "Twice" "a sparse and pensive track" and described the intro of the song as "harmonic". Althea Legapsi from Rolling Stone opined that the lyrics contemplate "the duality that can be found with love". Zach Johnson of E! Online labelled "Twice" as a "brooding ballad".

== Visuals video ==
Although the song was never promoted with an official music video, a conceptual visual video—created by Aguilera and her team—was released on May 11, 2018. It was meant to express the singer's thankfulness for her fans' support, and contains a spiritual, naturalist theme: Aguilera is seen submerged in water, and those scenes are followed by close-ups of flowers. Aguilera called the visuals "personal" and believed they "set a tone behind the feel of the music as a kind of backdrop". She said the video was shot because she "felt inspired by the themes of duality and inner struggle in 'Twice'".

== Live performances ==
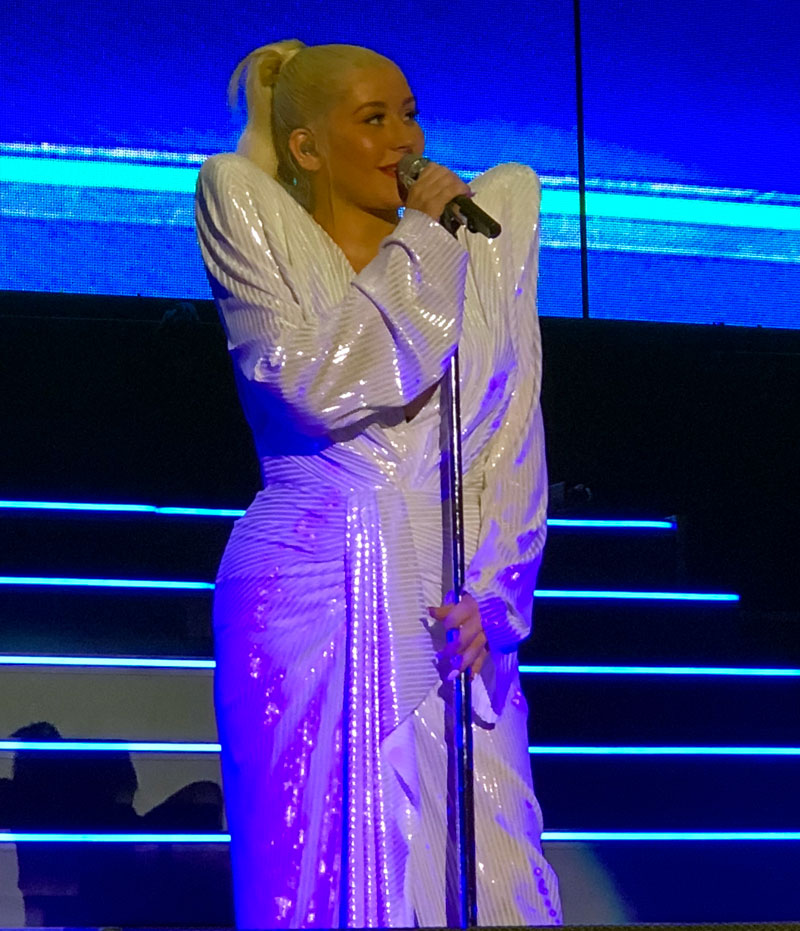
Aguilera performing the song during 2018's Liberation Tour

On June 9, 2018 Aguilera performed the track for the first time at the Genentech Gives Back benefit concert in San Francisco. Other songs presented on stage included Liberation singles "Accelerate" and "Fall in Line". Aguilera promoted "Fall in Line" during 2018's New York Fashion Week on September 9. Before she sang the song, celebrity drag queen Sasha Velour acted out the lyrics of "Twice".

The song was included in the setlist for Aguilera's 2018 Liberation Tour. The singer's rendition at the Radio City Music Hall on October 4, 2018 was called "killer" by The Star-Ledger's Bobby Olivier. In 2019, "Twice" was also performed during a concert residency Christina Aguilera: The Xperience, and The X Tour in Europe and Mexico. The X Tour's arrangement was met with critical acclaim, praised by Metro, Berliner Morgenpost, and FrontView Magazine. In July 2021, Aguilera performed "Twice" during her two night show at the Hollywood Bowl with Gustavo Dudamel and the Los Angeles Philharmonic.

== Accolades ==
Year	Ceremony	Category	Result	Ref.
2018	AMFT Awards	Best Pop Solo Performance	Won	

== Charts ==
Chart (2018)	Peak position
Australia Digital Tracks (ARIA)	35
France (SNEP)	169
French Digital Singles (SNEP)	164
Indonesian Digital Songs (LIMA)	1
Spain Physical/Digital (PROMUSICAE)	31
US Digital Song Sales (Billboard)	42
