= Fighter (Christina Aguilera song) =

2003 single by Christina Aguilera

Single by Christina Aguilera

from the album Stripped
- Released: March 10, 2003
- Recorded: 2002
- Studio: Conway (Hollywood, California); The Enterprise (Burbank, California)
- Genre: Pop rock; arena rock; R&B
- Length: 4:05
- Label: RCA
- Songwriters: Christina Aguilera; Scott Storch
- Producer: Scott Storch

Christina Aguilera singles chronology
"Beautiful" (2002)	"Fighter" (2003)	"Can't Hold Us Down" (2003)

Music video
- "Fighter" on YouTube

"Fighter" is a song by American singer Christina Aguilera for her fourth studio album, Stripped (2002). The song was written by Aguilera and Scott Storch, and produced by the latter. It was released by RCA Records as the third single from Stripped on March 10, 2003. Inspired by Guns N' Roses' song "November Rain", "Fighter" was characterized as a hybrid of rock and R&B that incorporates elements of arena rock and rock and roll. The track sees Aguilera thanking a man who had done her wrong for making her a "fighter."

"Fighter" received mostly positive reviews from music critics, who praised Aguilera's vocals and the song's empowering lyrics. The single peaked at number 20 on the US Billboard Hot 100 and was certified double platinum by the Recording Industry Association of America (RIAA). As of September 2014, "Fighter" has sold 1.184 million copies in the United States. Elsewhere, the song reached the top ten of several national music charts, including those in the United Kingdom, Canada, Australia, and the Netherlands.

A music video for "Fighter" was directed by Floria Sigismondi. Aguilera performed the track on four of her major concert tours: The Justified & Stripped Tour (2003), The Stripped Tour (2003), Back to Basics Tour (2006–2008), and Liberation Tour (2018). "Fighter" was notably covered by the American Idol winner Jordin Sparks and by American actor Darren Criss for the TV show Glee.

== Background and composition ==
In the book Chicken Soup for the Soul: The Story Behind the Song, Aguilera revealed the occasion, theme and meaning of "Fighter". She talked about her "very chaotic and abusive" home, where she did not feel "safe". In school, Aguilera was picked on and alienated because of her musical passion. However, it made her become "smarter and stronger". To release herself, Aguilera started to write songs at the age of 15, both music and lyrics; and it was the way how she found her voice. The writing process of "Fighter" began during her promotion for her debut album in 1999, when she was "a part of the big craze pop phenomenon". According to Aguilera, her debut album helped her a lot to develop the process. She wanted to make an "emotionally rich and positive empowering" song, especially for women, in order for them to speak for themselves be strong. About the idea of the track, she revealed, "I was coming up with titles and ideas and deciding what I wanted to write about. I had to sit down and make sense of my feelings and experiences. I learned a lot from the first record that helped me to develop. I took the good and the bad and considered some of the choices I made and became better because of it." Aguilera considers "Fighter" a "natural" and authentic song, adding that "when you can be honest, you can be free, and when you're free, you do your best work."

"Fighter"
A 20-second sample of "Fighter", inspired by various genres: pop, R&B, rock, arena rock and rock n roll. Lyrically, it talks about a man who has done something wrong to the protagonist.

"Fighter" is a "rock-infused" pop song. Sal Cinquemani from Slant Magazine said that "Fighter" is a hybrid of R&B and rock. Meanwhile, a reviewer of Billboard described the song as arena rock-influenced, and AOL Music's Nana-Adwoa Ofori noted the elements of rock and roll. However, Nick Levin from Digital Spy detailed "Fighter" as an arena rock piece. The song was inspired by band Guns N' Roses' song "November Rain" (1992). Written in the key of E minor, "Fighter" has a moderate tempo of 96 beats per minute. Brian Hiatt from Entertainment Weekly and Chuck Taylor for Billboard likened the track's musical style to that of Janet Jackson's "Black Cat". Aguilera's vocals on the track span from the low-note of G_{3} to the high-note of G_{5}; Taylor labelled Aguilera's vocals "tornado of a vocal."

At the beginning of "Fighter", the guitar sound was arranged in the chord progression of Em – G/D – D – C – Em/B – B – Am – C/G – G – B7. Aguilera speaks the lyrics, "After all you put me through, you'd think I'd despise you / But in the end, I wanna thank you, 'cause you made me that much stronger" on the guitar theme by Dave Navarro. Lyrically, Aguilera wants to thank the man who did her wrong rather than insult him, because he helped make her stronger and work harder, thus making her a fighter. At the chorus, she sings, "'Cause it makes me that much stronger/ Makes me work a little bit harder/ Makes me that much wiser/ So thanks for making me a fighter". The chords in the guitar part are E5 – F♯5 – G5 – A5 – B5 − C5 – B5 – A5 – G5 – F♯5 – E5. She continues, "Made me learn a little bit faster/ Made my skin a little bit thicker/ Makes me that much smarter/ So thanks for making me a fighter". The lyrics of "Fighter" have been recognized as "empowering". On the first episode of RuPaul's Drag Race: Untucked season 10, Aguilera said the song was about someone she loved but who "deserved it".

== Reception ==
=== Critical reception ===
"Fighter" received mostly positive reviews from music critics. David Brownie from Entertainment Weekly called it "spunkier than one would expect from a dance-floor strumpet who loves to flaunt her lung power." Chuck Taylor writing for Billboard complimented "Fighter" for demonstrating that Aguilera "[has] got the goods to rise above what so many lesser acts depend on for celebrity." On behalf of the same publication, Andrew Unterberger wrote that "Fighter" and "Can't Hold Us Down" are two tracks that helped "expand audience expectations of her image and sound." Digital Spy's Nick Levine named it a "strutting arena rock" song, while Nick Butler from Sputnikmusic simply called it "great." The New York Times editor Kelefa Sanneh positively viewed the track's theme as "fearless" and "full of mildly rebellious rhetoric." Ian Watson of Dotmusic noted that the song was inspired by Michael Jackson's album Bad. On a less positive side, BBC Music's Jacqueline Hodges called the song "hilarious", while Jancee Dunn from Rolling Stone wrote that the song "is a sterile foray into rock." Harper's Bazaar ranked "Fighter" among the fifty best songs of the 2000s. In 2023, the single was listed at number five of the 100 greatest songs of 2003 list, compiled by Billboard. Stephen Daw called it the "ode to the self [which] stands as one of Aguilera's best songs to date." Orlaith Condon of Ticketmaster ranked "Fighter" at number one on the list of Aguilera's best songs ever, calling it "gritty", "emotive" and "the ultimate feminist power anthem".

=== Chart performance ===
In the United States, "Fighter" debuted at number 61 on the Billboard Hot 100 chart on April 12, 2003, becoming the week's best-debuting single. In the following week, it jumped to number 56. On the issue dated April 26, 2003, the single charted at number 46. In its fourth week charting, "Fighter" raised to number 38. The single grew ten positions, charting at number 28 on May 10. On May 17, 2003, it charted at number 22. "Fighter" finally peaked at number 20 in its seventh week charting, becoming Aguilera's ninth top-twenty hit on the chart. On the Pop Songs chart, it peaked at number five. The single also peaked at number 28 on the Adult Pop Songs. On October 14, 2022, "Fighter" was certified double platinum by the Recording Industry Association of America (RIAA) for shipping more than 2,000,000 copies in the country. As of August 2014, the single has sold 1,184,000 million digital units in the United States. On the Canadian Singles Chart, it peaked at number three.

Throughout Europe, "Fighter" also attained moderate success on charts, peaking within the top 15 in most of the countries where it charted. It reached number 11 in Belgium (Flanders) and Switzerland, number 12 in Norway and Sweden, number 13 in Germany, and number 15 in Denmark, Italy and Spain. In Hungary, it peaked at number 8 on the Mega Top 100 Singles. The single also reached the top five in the Netherlands. On the UK Singles Chart, "Fighter" was a commercial success, peaking at number three and remained there for 13 weeks, becoming the longest-running single from Stripped on the chart. As of February 2013, "Fighter" has sold 159,000 copies in the United Kingdom. It has since been certified gold for selling 400,000 copies in the country. The single also garnered success in Australia and New Zealand, peaking at number five and 14 respectively in the two regions. Due to its chart success in Australia, the Australian Recording Industry Association (ARIA) certified "Fighter" gold for its shipments of 35,000 copies there.

== Music video ==
Aguilera in her black velvet kimono, followed by Gothic ballerinas

The music video for "Fighter" was directed by Floria Sigismondi, who revealed that it would display Aguilera "like I don't think she's been portrayed before". The video was filmed in Los Angeles, California from March 10 to 12, 2003, and was inspired by the director's signature dark theatrics and the life circle of moths. Sigismondi explained the theme and plot of the clip to MTV News:

"The song is sort of about transformation, so I took that in a nature kind of way, the way nature deals with transformation. It's basically about coming from a very poisoned place to an empowerment, a place of strength. I've always had this fear of moths, and I subconsciously wrote this thing with these moths in it, so I guess I have to deal with it. They're furry and they carry dust. I found out in old mythology they are supposed to represent the soul. I think that's very appropriate".

The video begins with Aguilera wearing a black velvet kimono, with a pale complexion and long black hair, refers to a larva. Initially, she is trapped in a glass box, and her kimono is billowing like a balloon. Three Gothic ballerinas eat fruit and then collapse. Aguilera then breaks free from the box by pounding on it until it shatters. She furiously removes three moth pins from her back, and then tosses aside her kimono. A tattered, white, moth-covered dress is revealed, symbolizing her metaphoric evolution from the larva to a pupa. In addition, her hair becomes white, and moths fly around her. Intercut scenes of moths and Aguilera's blue eyes are then shown. Near the end, Aguilera wears an Elvira-type spider dress, again proclaiming that she is a "fighter" before kicking at the camera.

The music video for "Fighter" garnered numerous awards. At the 2003 Belgian TMF Awards, the clip won Best Video International. It garnered Aguilera and Sigismondi a Juno Award for Video of the Year at the 2004 ceremony, which was held at Rexall Place in Edmonton, Alberta, Canada. It also earned four MVPA Awards for Best Pop Video, Best Cinematography, Best Make-Up and Best Styling in a Video in 2004, held at Orpheum Theater in Los Angeles, California. The video received a Vevo Certified Award on YouTube for over 100 million views.

== Live performances ==
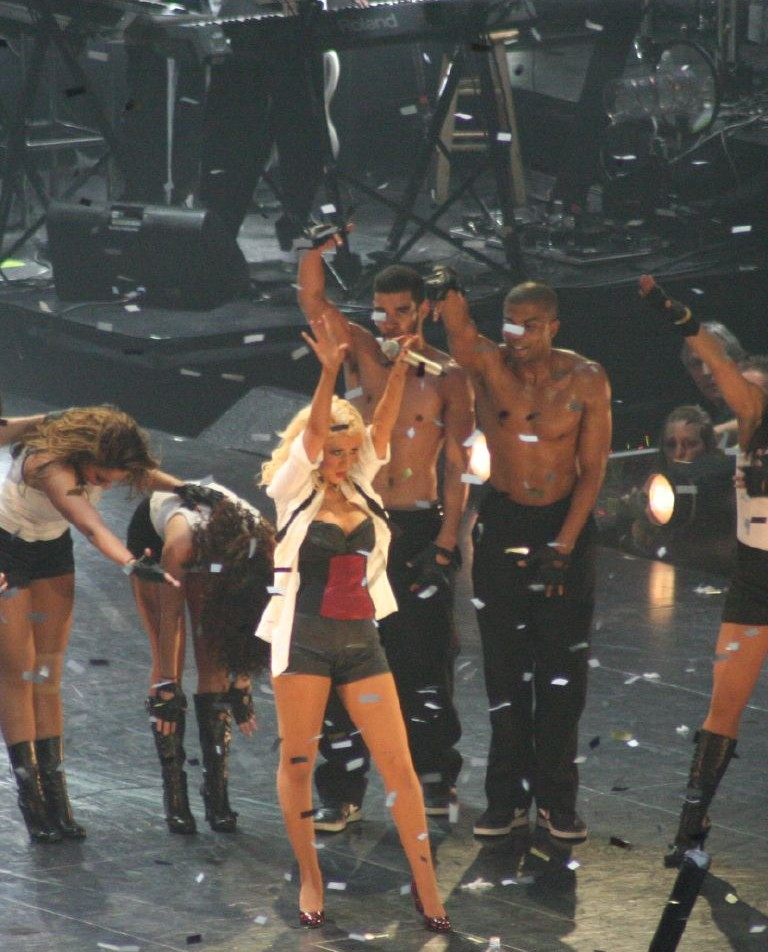
Aguilera performing "Fighter" during the encore on her Back to Basics Tour in 2007

Aguilera performed "Fighter" on a number of shows. The singer performed the song for the first time on Saturday Night Live on March 15, 2003. Aguilera also performed "Fighter" at the 2003 MTV Video Music Awards, held at Radio City Music Hall in New York City on August 28, 2003, in a medley with "Dirrty"; the performance featured Redman as a featured artist, and Dave Navarro as the guitarist. There, she also performed with Madonna, Britney Spears and Missy Elliott a medley of Madonna's songs "Like a Virgin" and "Hollywood", and Elliott's "Work It". The song was also performed on Aguilera and Justin Timberlake's 2003 summer tour Justified and Stripped Tour, in order to support Stripped and Timberlake's album Justified. In late 2003, Aguilera performed the track during the tour's extension, The Stripped Tour, which happened without Timberlake. The performance is included on her first full-length DVD Stripped Live in the U.K. (2004). On June 1, 2007, during the promotion of Back to Basics, Aguilera performed "Fighter" along with "Ain't No Other Man", "Hurt" and "Candyman" at the 2007 Muz-TV Awards. Later, during her 2006–07 Back to Basics Tour, the track was performed as the last song in the encore. Barry Walters for Rolling Stone labelled the performance of "Fighter" "ended the show on a hard-rocking high". It is included on the video release Back to Basics: Live and Down Under (2008).

On June 8, 2010, the singer sang the track with four other songs, "Bionic", "Not Myself Tonight", "Beautiful" and "You Lost Me" on The Today Show. Selected as the opener of the show, James Dinh for MTV News named it "aggressive", while Erika Brooks Adickman for Idolator called the performance a "hot-mess show wardrobe". On June 11, 2010, Aguilera performed "Fighter", "You Lost Me", "Not Myself Tonight" along with a medley of "Genie in a Bottle" and "What a Girl Wants" on The Early Show. Later that year, on June 13, she performed all of her biggest hits on VH1 Storytellers, including "Fighter". Before performing the song, Aguilera revealed to the crowd, "When I was younger there were a lot of people, as I mentioned before, that were sort of around me for the wrong reasons. There's always a positive to those negative times because throughout it you come out so much stronger and wiser". During the Justin Timberlake & Friends benefit show–held by Justin Timberlake on October 24, 2010, in Las Vegas, Nevada–Aguilera was invited to perform several of her hits, including "Beautiful", "Fighter" and "Ain't No Other Man". On April 16, 2012, Aguilera performed "Fighter" again on the second season of US reality show The Voice, on which she is one of the judges and coaches, with her "Team Xtina" and Crenshaw High School choir. Jonathan Hofmann called the performance "insane and bizarre as it sounds".

In July 2021, Aguilera performed the song for two nights at the Hollywood Bowl with Gustavo Dudamel and the Los Angeles Philharmonic. She also sang excerpts from the song during the 47th People's Choice Awards.

== Legacy and notable covers ==
Since its release, "Fighter" has been recognized as one of Aguilera's most empowering songs for women due to its lyrics. It was also featured on several shows. On April 6, 2003, a 90-second music video featuring Aguilera preparing for a center court performance at the Staples Center in Los Angeles was premiered for National Basketball Association (NBA)'s "Love It Live" promotional section. The clip also featured several NBA famous acts, including Michael Jordan, Kobe Bryant, Shaquille O'Neal, and Yao Ming. "Fighter" was also included in the American reality show, The Biggest Loser, which aired by NBC. Jordin Sparks performed the song during the final episode of the 6th season of American Idol, where she emerged as the winner.

American actor Darren Criss, portrayed as his fictional character Blaine Anderson, performed the song on the episode "Big Brother" of the FOX popular TV show Glee, aired on April 10, 2012. The version peaked at number 58 on the Hot Digital Songs and at number 85 on the Canadian Hot 100. Erika Jayne gave a rendition of "Fighter" during the Aguilera-themed episode on Lip Sync Battle. In a 2018 interview, American recording artist Lauren Jauregui stated that she was inspired by the song, saying: "Christina is a huge part of my developmental years, just getting into owning who I am (...). 'Fighter' was major because obviously when you're growing up there's a lot of bullies." In 2019, "Fighter" was also featured in the fourth season of RuPaul's Drag Race All Stars. The song is considered a gay anthem. It was also featured in the video game Fortnite Festival. Aguilera also performed "Fighter" in the 2018 comedy film Life of the Party, opposite Melissa McCarthy, where she portrayed herself.

== Track listings and formats ==
CD single

1. "Fighter" – 4:05
2. "Fighter" (video) – 4:05

Maxi single

1. "Fighter"– 4:05
2. "Fighter" (Freelance Hellraiser "Thug Pop" Mix) – 5:11
3. "Beautiful" (Valentin Mix) – 5:51

DVD

1. "Fighter" (video)
2. "Fighter"
3. Photo gallery
4. "Beautiful" (Valentin Club Mix)

== Credits and personnel ==
Credits are adapted from the "Fighter" CD single liner notes

Studios

- Recorded at The Enterprise Studios in Burbank, California
- Recorded at Conway Studios in Hollywood, Los Angeles, California
- Mixed at The Record Plant, Los Angeles, California
- Mastered at Bernie Grundman Mastering

Personnel

- Writing – Christina Aguilera, Scott Storch
- Producing – Scott Storch
- Mixing – Tony Maserati
- Recording – Wassim Zreik, Oscar Ramirez
- Mastering – Brian "Big Bass" Gardner
- Vocals producing and arranging – Christina Aguilera, E. Dawk
- Strings arranging and conducting – Larry Gold
- Dave Navarro appears courtesy of Capitol Records

== Charts ==
=== Weekly charts ===
Weekly chart performance for "Fighter"
Chart (2003)	Peak position
Australia (ARIA)	5
Austria (Ö3 Austria Top 40)	12
Belgium (Ultratop 50 Flanders)	11
Belgium (Ultratop 50 Wallonia)	27
Canada (Nielsen SoundScan)	3
Croatia International (HRT) (Note: Only a partial archive of the Croatian chart is available so it is possible that the single had a higher peak.)	9
Denmark (Tracklisten)	15
Europe (Eurochart Hot 100)	3
Finland Airplay (Suomen virallinen lista)	12
Germany (GfK)	13
Hungary (Single Top 40)	8
Ireland (IRMA)	4
Italy (FIMI)	15
Netherlands (Dutch Top 40)	5
Netherlands (Single Top 100)	8
New Zealand (Recorded Music NZ)	14
Norway (VG-lista)	12
Poland Airplay (Music & Media)	10
Poland (Polish Airplay Top 30)	2
Romania (Romanian Top 100)	91
Scottish Singles Sales (Official Charts)	5
Spain (Promusicae)	15
Sweden (Sverigetopplistan)	12
Switzerland (Schweizer Hitparade)	11
UK Singles (Official Charts)	3
UK Rock & Metal (Official Charts)	2
US Billboard Hot 100	20
US Adult Pop Airplay (Billboard)	28
US Pop Airplay (Billboard)	5

=== Year-end charts ===
Year-end chart performance for "Fighter"
Chart (2003)	Position
Australia (ARIA)	74
Belgium (Ultratop 50 Flanders)	73
Ireland (IRMA)	70
Netherlands (Dutch Top 40)	68
Sweden (Hitlistan)	74
Switzerland (Schweizer Hitparade)	77
UK Singles (OCC)	99
US Billboard Hot 100	79
US Mainstream Top 40 (Billboard)	21

== Certifications ==
Certifications and sales for "Fighter"
Region	Certification	Certified units/sales
Australia (ARIA)	Gold	35,000^{^}
Canada (Music Canada)	Platinum	80,000^{‡}
New Zealand (RMNZ)	Platinum	30,000^{‡}
United Kingdom (BPI)	Platinum	600,000^{‡}
United States (RIAA)	2× Platinum	2,000,000^{‡}
^{^} Shipments figures based on certification alone.^{‡} Sales+streaming figures based on certification alone.

== Release history ==
Release dates and formats for "Fighter"
Region	Date	Format(s)	Label(s)	Ref.
United States	March 10, 2003	Contemporary hit radio	RCA	
Australia	June 9, 2003	Maxi CD	BMG	
United Kingdom	June 9, 2003	Cassette; DVD; maxi CD	RCA	
France	June 10, 2003	Maxi CD	BMG	
Germany	June 10, 2003	Maxi CD	BMG	
Italy	June 10, 2003	Maxi CD	BMG	
Sweden	June 10, 2003	Maxi CD	RCA	
Italy	June 13, 2003	DVD	BMG	

== Bibliography ==
- Canfield, Jack; Hansen, Mark; Giffen, Jo-Ann (November 1, 2009). "Christina Aguilera: Fighter". Chicken Soup for the Soul: The Story Behind the Song. United States: Chicken Soup for the Soul Publishing LLC. ISBN 978-1-935-09640-5.
