= EU / UK Summer Series =

2022 concert tour by Christina Aguilera

- Continental tour by Christina Aguilera
- Location: Europe
- Associated album: Aguilera
- Start date: June 25, 2022
- End date: August 6, 2022
- Legs: 1
- No. of shows: 8 in Europe
- Supporting act: Union J

Christina Aguilera concert chronology
- The X Tour (2019); EU / UK Summer Series (2022); Christina Aguilera at Voltaire (2023–2024)

EU / UK Summer Series, also called Summer Series, was the first promotional tour by American singer Christina Aguilera, in support of her three-part Spanish-language ninth studio album, Aguilera (2022). The tour was announced following the release of the EP La Fuerza, the album's first part, with the first three UK shows going on sale on February 4, 2022. It began on June 25, 2022 in Mallorca, Spain, and concluded on August 6, 2022 in Brighton, England, lasting eight shows across Europe. Union J served as the opening act for the UK shows.

Five of the tour's eight shows were part of Aguilera's headlining set on several different music festivals, such as the Cap Roig Festival in Barcelona and the Starlite Festival in Monaco. The opening show in Mallorca was Aguilera's first performance in Spain since The Stripped Tour (2003). The tour is Aguilera's first tour after the COVID-19 pandemic, following The X Tour (2019).

== Background ==
Following the cancellation of her Las Vegas concert residency, Christina Aguilera: The Xperience, Aguilera began recording her three-part ninth studio album, Aguilera, which was released on May 31, 2022 to critical acclaim. Released in three, separate parts, Aguilera announced the first three shows of the tour, taking place in the England between August 2 through August 5, 2022 following the release of the album's first part, La Fuerza in January 2022. In early May, Aguilera was the announced as a headliner for the Mallorca Live Festival 2022. The second EP off the album, La Tormenta was eventually released and later reissued along with La Fuerza as part of Aguilera, which was released on May 31, 2022. Aguilera was announced as a performer at the Monte Carlo Summer Festival on July 24, 2022.

The tour primarily consists of festival shows, with the only exception being the shows in Scarborough, Liverpool and London. For these shows, English boy band Union J served as the opening act. Aguilera's show on June 25, at the festival in Marcolla marked the first time she performed in Spain in almost twenty years, since her performance in Barcelona on The Stripped Tour in 2003.

== Reception ==
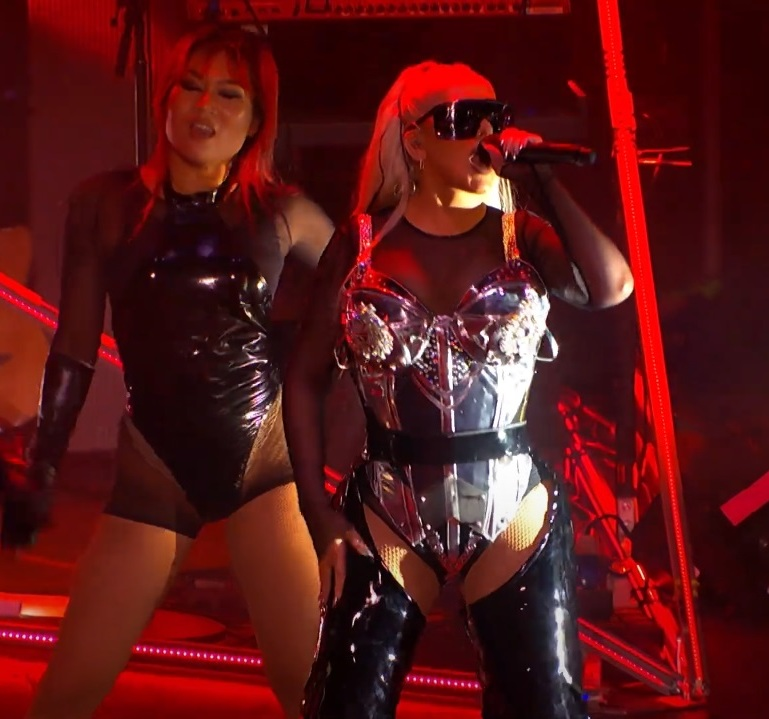
Aguilera during the EU / UK Summer Series in Marbella

The set garnered critical acclaim. Writing for The Guardian, Dave Simpson gave the opening night of the second leg in Scarborough show four stars, calling it "an 80-minute audiovisual extravaganza" and complimenting the wide range of genres included and the "dazzling effect" of her voice. Elle May Rice of the Liverpool Echo gave the show at the M&S Bank Arena in Liverpool a five star rating, complimenting its costuming, versatility and Aguilera's ability to keep "the crowd captivated to the last second". The Mancunion's Jay Darcy called Aguilera's performance an "electrifying showcase of her artistry and success", and complimented the show's "dazzling and dramatic" nature.

An editor for Daily Mirror noted that Aguilera "mixed together different genres" and was "slipping effortlessly between ballads and upbeat dance numbers". He called the singer's Monte Carlo concert a "five star performance", adding that the "audience sang along religiously to every song" [of hers]. In a four star review for i, Alim Kheraj called the London set at The O2 Arena "worthy of her pop legend status", calling Aguilera "a born show woman" and praising her "chest-tightening" vocals. However, Kheraj went on to criticize the minimal staging and "muddled" sound production, giving credit to Aguilera's catalogue and stripped vocals for carrying the show. Another four-star review came from Stephen Dalton of The Times. Dalton praised Aguilera for her vocal abilities, writing: "her baroque, hyperbolic, melismatic vocal technique is the real genie in the bottle here".

== Set list ==
=== Songs ===
The following set list is obtained from the June 25, 2022 concert in Mallorca. It is not intended to represent all dates throughout the tour.

1. "Are You Ready to Get Dirrty?" (introduction; contains elements of "Your Body" and "Dirrty")
2. "Dirrty"
3. "Can't Hold Us Down"
4. "Bionic"
5. "Vanity"
6. "Genie in a Bottle"
7. "Ya Llegué" (interlude)
8. "Santo"
9. "Suéltame"
10. "Como Yo" (interlude)
11. "Pa Mis Muchachas"
12. "Feel This Moment" (contains elements of "Desnudate")
13. "Cristina" (interlude; contains elements "Tití Me Preguntó", "Pepas", and "Dirrty")
14. "Ain't No Other Man"
15. "Show Me How You Burlesque" (interlude)
16. "Express"
17. "Lady Marmalade"
18. "Beautiful"

Encore

19. "Fighter"
20. "Let There Be Love"

=== Notes ===
- During the show in Scarborough, singer Nelson joined Christina to perform "Say Something".
- Starting on August 3, 2022, "Candyman" was added permanently to the set list.
- During the show in London, Aguilera was joined onstage by Olly Alexander to sing "Say Something".

== Shows ==
List of concerts, showing date, city, country, event, venue, opening act,
Date (2022)	City	Country	Event	Venue	Opening act
June 25	Mallorca	Spain	Mallorca Live Festival	Antiguo Aquapark	—N/a
July 23	Calella de Palafrugell	Spain	Cap Roig Festival	Cap Roig Botanical Gardens	—N/a
July 25	Marbella	Spain	Starlite Festival	Cantera de Nagüeles	—N/a
July 29	Monte Carlo	Monaco	Monte Carlo Summer Festival	Salle des Etoiles	Union J
August 2	Scarborough	England	Theater concert	Scarborough Open Air Theatre	Union J
August 3	Liverpool	England	Arena concert	M&S Bank Arena	Union J
August 5	London	England	Arena concert	The O_{2} Arena	Union J
August 6	Brighton and Hove	England	Brighton Pride	Preston Hall Park	Union J
Total

== Cancelled shows ==
List of cancelled concerts, showing date, city, country, event, venue and reason for cancellation
Date (2022)	City	Country	Event	Venue	Reason
July 22	Valencia	Spain	Diversity Valencia Festival	City of Arts and Sciences	Festival cancellation

== See also ==
- List of Christina Aguilera concerts
