= Suéltame =

2022 single by Christina Aguilera and Tini

Single by Christina Aguilera and Tini

from the album Aguilera
- Language: Spanish
- English title: "Let Me Go"
- Released: May 30, 2022
- Recorded: 2021
- Studio: Criteria Studios (Miami, FL)
- Genre: Urbano; tango
- Length: 2:53
- Label: Sony Latin
- Songwriters: Christina Aguilera; Martina Stoessel; Andrés Torres; Federico Vindver; Mauricio Rengifo; Rafael Arcaute; Kat Dahlia
- Producers: Andrés Torres; Mauricio Rengifo; Federico Vindver; Rafa Arcaute; Afo Verde (co.); Jean Rodríguez (voc.)

Christina Aguilera singles chronology
"Santo" (2022)	"Suéltame" (2022)	"No Es Que Te Extrañe" (2022)

Tini singles chronology
"Carne y Hueso" (2022)	"Suéltame" (2022)	"La Loto" (2022)

Music video
- "Suéltame" on YouTube

"Suéltame" (transl. "Let Me Go") is a song by American singer Christina Aguilera and Argentine singer Tini for the former's ninth studio and second Spanish-language album, Aguilera (2022). It was written by the performers alongside Andrés Torres, Federico Vindver, Mauricio Rengifo, Rafa Arcaute, and Kat Dahlia. It was produced by Torres, Rengifo, Vindver and Arcaute and co-produced by Afo Verde. The song's initial release was postponed due to the Robb Elementary School shooting in Uvalde, Texas before it was released through Sony Music Latin as the album's fourth single on May 30, 2022, the only one featured on the album's second part, La Tormenta.

"Suéltame" is an urban tango song, keeping in theme with the album's musical direction of honoring different genres of Latin music. The song's lyrics describe a date in a nightclub where the singers flirt with a lover, while respecting each-other's barriers in sex. The song received positive reviews, with critics complimenting the song's "chill" and "catchy" melody and its sensual lyrics.

The song's music video was directed by Ana Lily Amirpour and was released on July 22, 2022. The music video features a murder mystery theme, where Aguilera's character is seated at a table at a birthday party with guests that may want to kill her that might. The video ends with Aguilera being poisoned by the birthday cake.

== Composition ==
"Suéltame" is described as "a sultry tango-meets-urban collab where the lady takes matters into her own hands by Billboard. It also has bossa nova, reggaeton and trap influences. The song lasts for a duration of two minutes and fifty-three seconds. Lyrically, is about an exciting date in a nightclub, flirting, and mutual observance of each other's brakes and barriers in sex. It is written in the key of F Minor, with a moderately fast tempo of 138 beats per minute.

== Release ==
The release of the single was postponed for a few days due to the Uvalde school shooting. "Suéltame" premiered on May 30, 2022, and was released commercially for digital download and on streaming platforms worldwide at the same time.

== Critical reception ==
The song received positive reviews. It has been called a "sultry, yearning temptation" by AllMusic's Neil Z. Yeung, and linked to La Fuerza's track "Ya Llegué". Townsquare Media deemed "Suéltame" "the song of Summer 2022". L'Opinionista opined that it was one of the best songs of July 2022, placing it at number nine on its top twenty list, and calling it "very sensual". Similarly, Argentinian daily newspaper Crónica labelled the single as a "sensual collaboration". Writing for Prime News, Albert Nowicki praised the track for its "chill", "catchy melody" and Aguilera's soothing vocals. Víctor Berzal de Miguel of Cultura Diversa considered "Suéltame" a "breath of freshness" and a "seducing, catchy mix of soft reggaetón and trap", and thought the song "kicks off the EP [La Tormenta] softly". "Suéltame" was listed as one of the best Latin songs of 2022 by Spotify's experts.

== Music video ==
The music video for "Suéltame" was directed by Ana Lily Amirpour and produced by Sara Greco. The footage opens with a birthday cake-making process. However, someone puts a drop of snake poison in the batter. The cake is later presented in front of the pop star, who is not knowing that people around her want her to die. Those sitting around Christina are her distant relative, who "rides her coattails," the bodyguard, who "knows her weak spots," and the lawyer, who is "getting greedy" among others. Then Tini appears as Christinas's undercover, sensing that something bad is about to happen. The video ends with Tini getting bite of strawberry as hinting of Christina getting bite of the poisonous cake and ends choked up.

== Live performances ==
Aguilera performed "Suéltame" live for the first time at the 2022 Mallorca Live Festival, along with other songs from Aguilera. It was the first show in Aguilera's EU/UK Summer Series promotional tour for the album.

== Personnel ==
Vocals

- Christina Aguilera – lead vocals
- Tini – co-lead vocals

Musicians and technicians

- Rafa Arcuate – producer, keyboards, programmer, recording engineer
- Ray Charles Brown, Jr. – recording engineer
- Morgan David – assistant engineer
- Jaycen Joshua – mixing engineer
- Jean Rodríguez – recording engineer, vocal producer
- Mauricio Rengifo – producer, keyboards, programmer, recording engineer
- Andrés Torres – producer, keyboards, programmer, recording engineer
- Felipe Trujillo – assistant engineer
- Afo Verde – co-producer
- Federico Vindver – producer, keyboards, programmer, recording engineer

== Charts ==
=== Weekly charts ===
Chart (2022)	Peak position
El Salvador (Monitor Latino)	13
El Salvador Pop (Monitor Latino)	11
El Salvador Urban (Monitor Latino)	13
Mexico Espanol Airplay (Billboard)	19
Panama (PRODUCE)	43
Panama Pop (Monitor Latino)	7
Puerto Rico Pop (Monitor Latino)	11
US Latin Pop Airplay (Billboard)	23

=== Year-end charts ===
Chart (2022)	Position
Puerto Rico Pop (Monitor Latino)	47

== Release history ==
Release history for "Suéltame"
Region	Date	Format	Label	Ref.
Various	May 30, 2022	Digital download; streaming	Sony Latin	
Latin America	June 3, 2022	Contemporary hit radio	Sony Latin	
