= Aguilera (album) =

2022 studio album by Christina Aguilera

Studio album by Christina Aguilera
- Released: May 31, 2022
- Recorded: February–April 2021
- Studios: Art House; Criteria (Miami)
- Genre: Latin
- Length: 43:03
- Language: Spanish
- Label: Sony Latin
- Producers: Rafa Arcaute; Édgar Barrera; Luis Barrera; DallasK; Feid; HoneyBoos; JonTheProducer; Juan Diego Linares; Yasmil Marrufo; Mauricio Rengifo; Slow; Andrés Torres; Federico Vindver

Christina Aguilera chronology
La Tormenta (2022)	Aguilera (2022)	The 25th Anniversary of Christina Aguilera (Spotify Anniversaries Live) (2024)

Singles from Aguilera
- 1. "Pa Mis Muchachas" Released: October 22, 2021; 2. "Somos Nada" Released: November 18, 2021; 3. "Santo" Released: January 20, 2022; 4. "Suéltame" Released: May 30, 2022; 5. "No Es Que Te Extrañe" Released: September 30, 2022

Aguilera is the second Spanish-language and ninth overall studio album by American singer-songwriter Christina Aguilera. It was released through Sony Music Latin on May 31, 2022, as the follow-up to her first Spanish-language album, Mi Reflejo (2000), and her previous release, Liberation (2018). Titled after her Spanish surname, Aguilera created the album as a means to pay tribute to and connect herself and her children to their Latin American heritage. Aguilera is a trilogy album, consisting of three separately-released parts: La Fuerza, La Tormenta and La Luz. Each part deals with one of the album's central themes of empowerment, vulnerability, and healing.

Aiming to pay tribute to different genres of Latin music, Aguilera includes genres such as cumbia, tango, tropical music, guaracha and reggaeton, and features heavy dance-pop, Latin pop, and urbano influences. The album features collaborations with Becky G, Nicki Nicole, Nathy Peluso, Ozuna, Tini and Christian Nodal. To promote the album, five singles were released from the album, including "Pa Mis Muchachas" and "Santo", which both received platinum certifications (Latin field) from the Recording Industry Association of America (RIAA).

Upon release, the album received favorable reviews from critics and reached the top-twenty on the US Latin Pop Albums chart. Aguilera embarked on the EU / UK Summer Series promotional tour in summer of 2022 which featured five festival shows and three standalone shows in the UK. Aguilera and its songs received a combined total of eight Latin Grammy Award nominations, with the album being nominated for Album of the Year, winning the Best Traditional Pop Vocal Album category. The album also received two nominations at the 65th Annual Grammy Awards, including Best Latin Pop Album.

== Development ==
=== Background ===
Aguilera's first Spanish-language release was Mi Reflejo, which was released as her second studio album on September 12, 2000. After its release, Aguilera would continue release several collaborations in Spanish such as "Hoy Tengo Ganas de Ti" with Alejandro Fernández in 2013, as well as incorporating Latin themes and Spanish lyrics throughout her English-language albums including the songs "Infatuation" from Stripped (2002), and "Desnudate" from Bionic (2010).

While working on her eighth studio album, Liberation (2018), Aguilera took a trip to Ecuador in September 2015 as an ambassador for the World Food Programme. Being half-Ecuadorian herself, Aguilera revealed that the trip had inspired her and that she had begun accumulating ideas for a Spanish-language album. During her appearance on Watch What Happens Live! with Andy Cohen in January 2019, Aguilera was asked about whether or not an album she had recently teased on Instagram was her Spanish album, to which she responded by saying, "It's definitely getting back to my roots again [...] the follow-up Spanish album has been on my to-do list forever".

=== Production ===
Recording sessions on the album began in 2021 following the cancellation of Aguilera's Las Vegas residency Christina Aguilera: The Xperience due to the COVID-19 pandemic, in September 2020. In early 2021, Aguilera relocated to Miami, Florida to continue working on the album in a writing camp held by Sony Music Latin. Sessions were held at Criteria and Art House recording studios starting in February 2021, and continued into April 2021. Aguilera enlisted producers Federico Vindver, Rafa Arcaute, and DallasK to work on the album. The first song created in the first session was the album's lead single, "Pa Mis Muchachas". Aguilera conceived the idea of a multiple part album, after the album's first part, La Fuerza, was completed four weeks into production. She stated that the album would be split into three "six song increments", released as themed EPs throughout 2022 until the album's final full release.

Among the songs recorded for Aguilera but not included on its final tracklist are "Lloras Por Na'" (featuring C. Tangana), "Segura", "Dolores", which also features C. Tangana and "Teatro".

== Composition ==
=== Music, genres and themes ===
Aguilera revealed that her goal with the album's musical direction was to pay tribute to Latin music genres. The genres featured on the album include guaracha, tango, ranchera, urbano, and pasillo. It also showcases heavy influences and elements of cumbia, dance-pop, Latin pop, reggaeton, and tropical music.

The album's lyrical content is separated into three parts, with each part dealing with its own theme. The album's first part, La Fuerza (transl. The Strength), is a six-track set which focuses on emotional strength and female empowerment. The second part of the album, La Tormenta (transl. The Storm), is made up of six tracks, (Note: In its independent extended play (EP) release, La Tormenta features five original songs. The version of La Tormenta featured on the album includes a second version of "Cuando Me Dé la Gana" with Christian Nodal.) and its main theme is vulnerability. The album's final part, La Luz (transl. The Light), features a spoken word intro and one song. La Luz is centered on forgiveness and closure, taking inspiration from Aguilera's own experience with domestic violence.

=== Content and lyrics ===
Guest performers
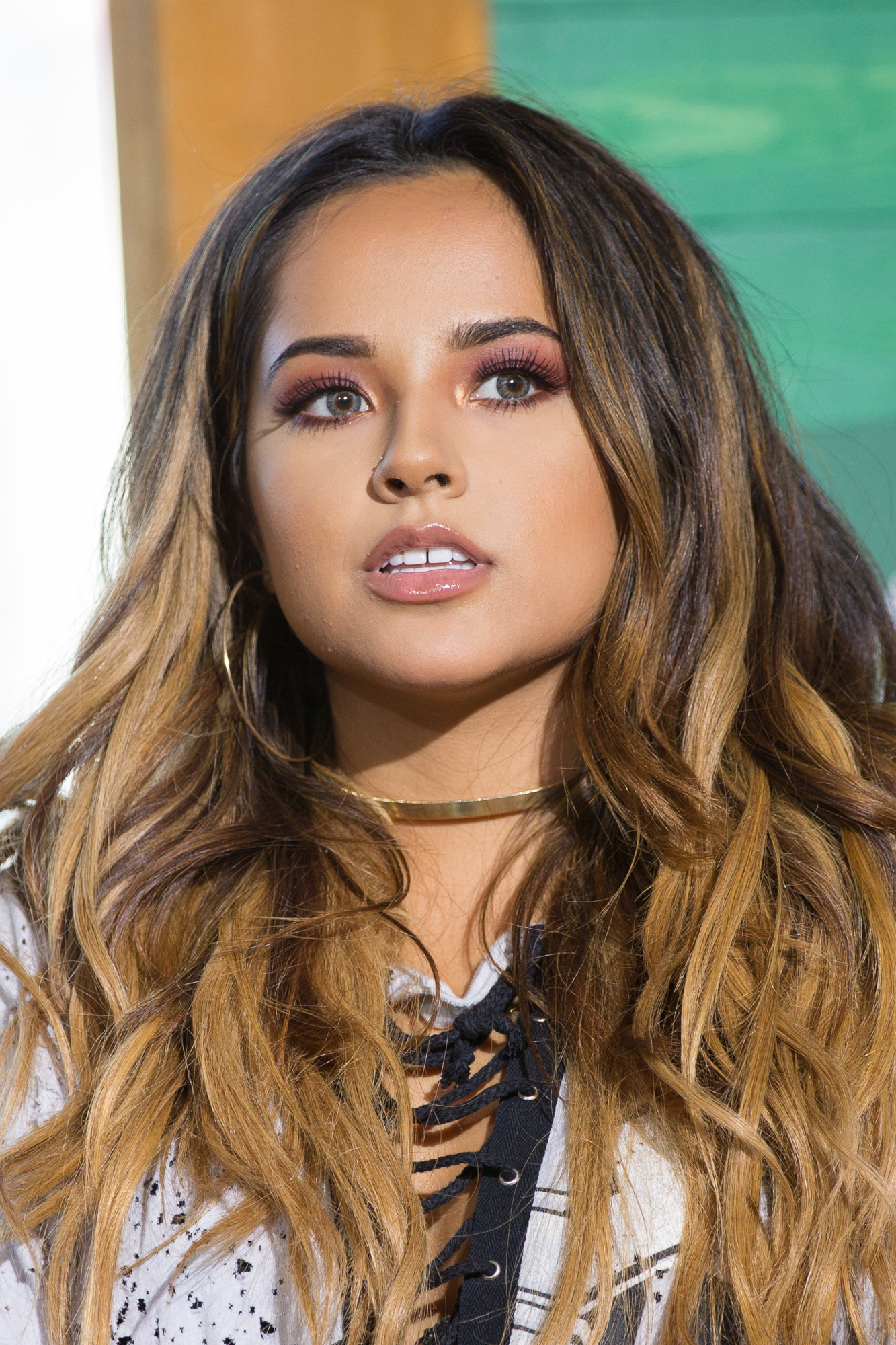
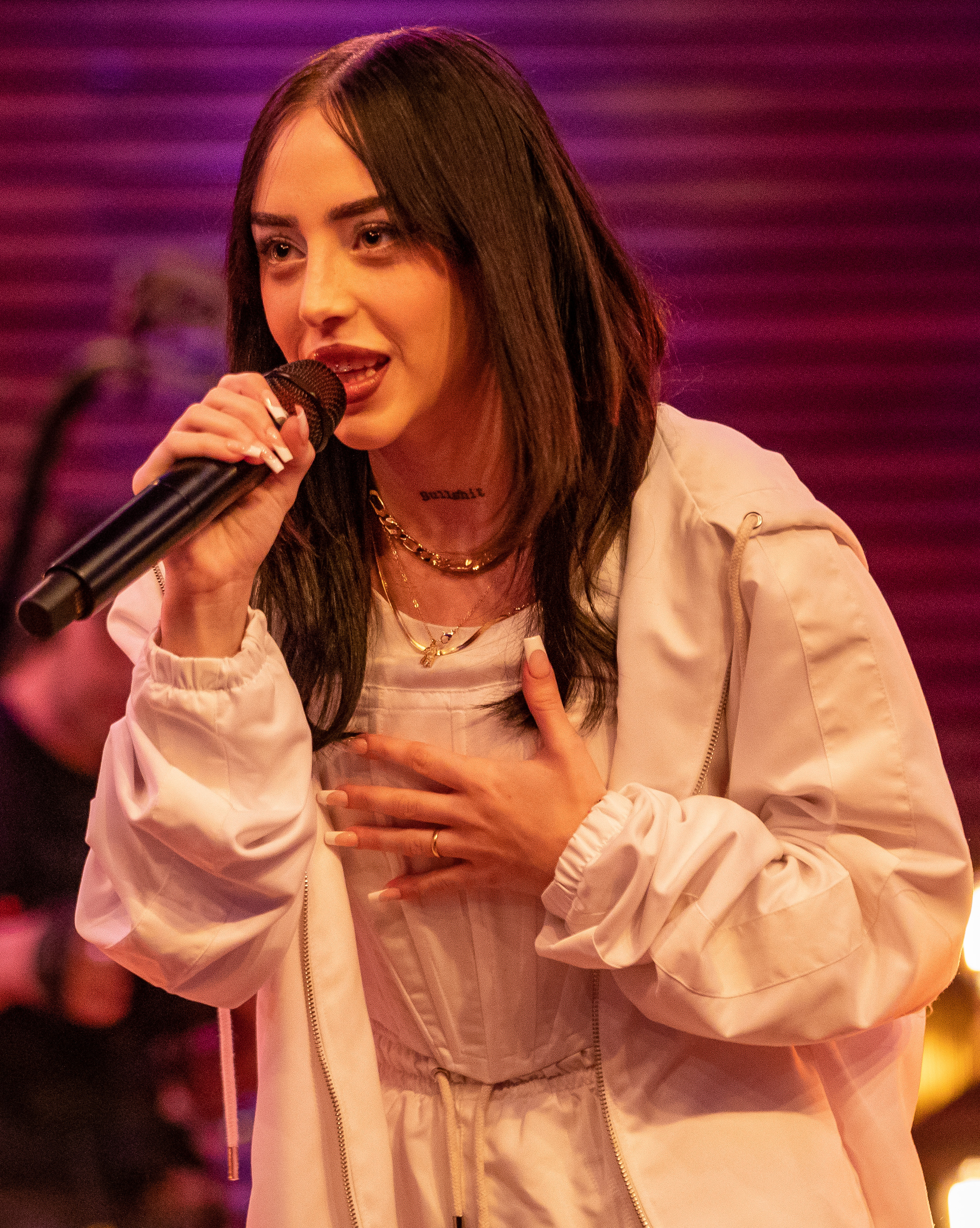
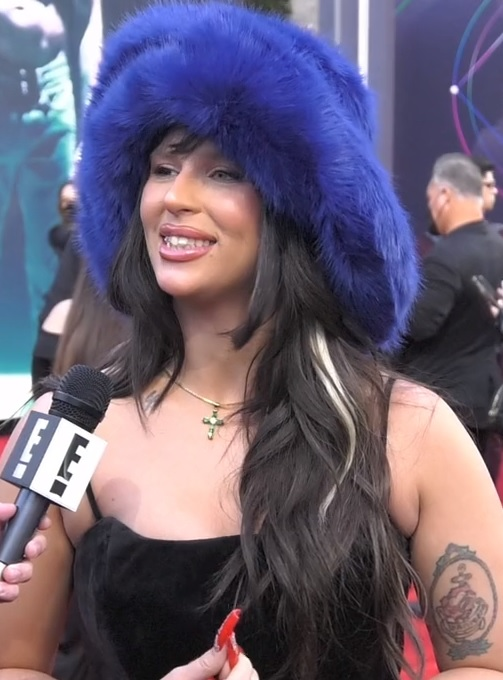
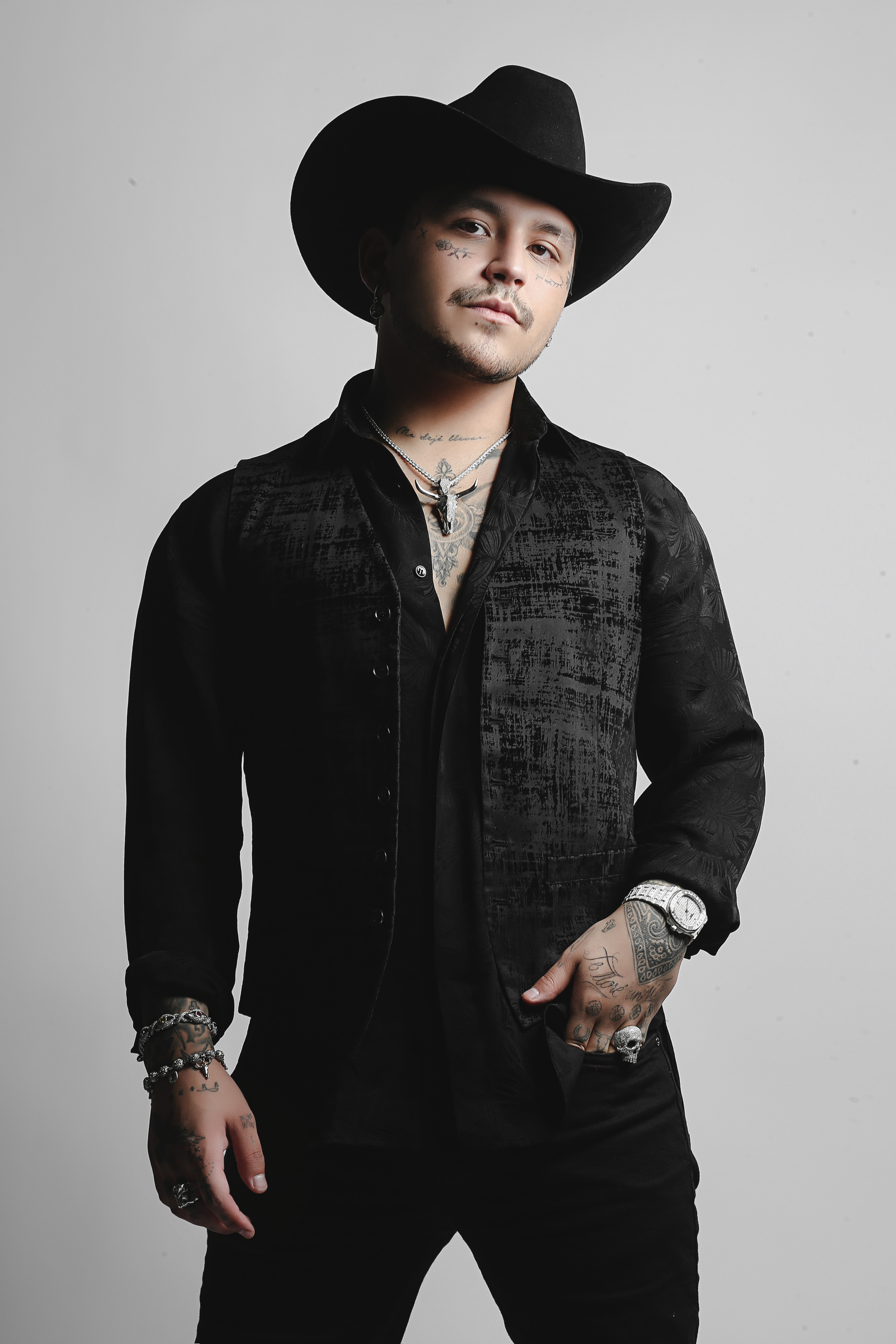
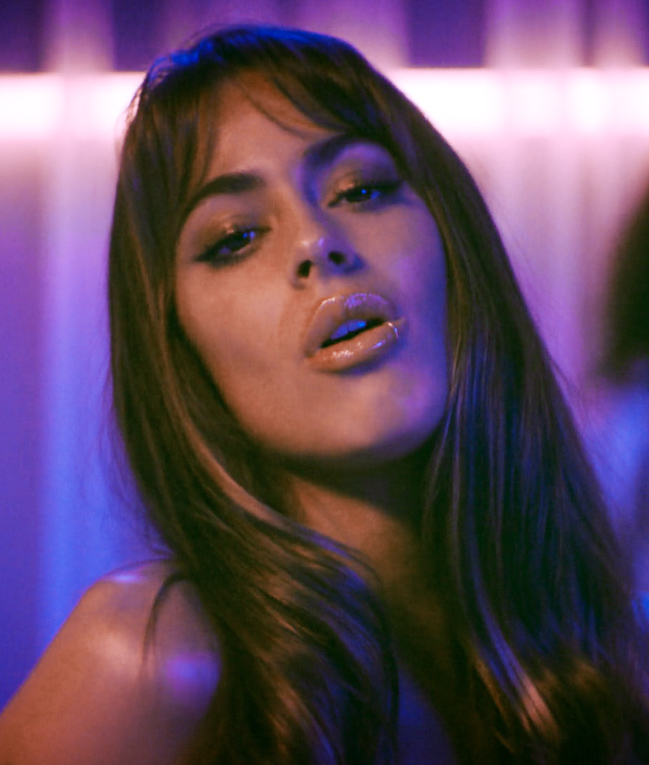
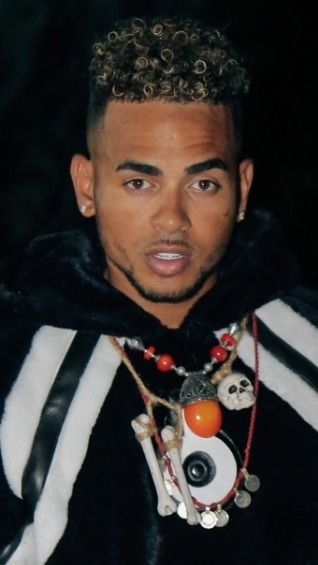
Clockwise from top left: Becky G, Nicki Nicole, and Nathy Peluso, appear on "Pa Mis Muchachas", while Ozuna and Tini sing on "Santo" and "Suéltame" respectively. Christian Nodal provides guest vocals on the second version of "Cuando Me Dé la Gana".

The album's opening track, "Ya Llegué" (transl. "I'm Here"), is a "sultry futuristic track" which "gradually turns into a hard-hitting reggaeton". The song samples Aguilera's own 1999 song "Genie in a Bottle". The song is written in the key of E♭ Minor at a tempo of 95 beats-per-minute. The song is followed by "Pa Mis Muchachas" (transl. "For My Girls") with Becky G, Nicki Nicole and featuring Nathy Peluso and was described by Aguilera as "an homage to women". The song drew comparisons to Aguilera's 2001 "Lady Marmalade" with Mýa, Pink, and Lil' Kim. Aguilera revealed that she chose Becky G, Nicole and Peluso "because of the strength they exude". "Pa Mis Muchachas" is a guaracha song written in the key of A Minor at a tempo of 118 beats-per-minute.

"Somos Nada" (transl. "We Are Nothing") is a "stripped-down piano-led nostalgic ballad that puts [Aguilera's] deep, powerful tone at the forefront". Written in C Major at a moderately slow tempo of 50 beats-per-minute, the song was named a signature song of Aguilera's and its lyrics are about overcoming obstacles and trying to not lose faith in love. "Santo" (transl. "Saint") is a collaboration with Puerto Rican singer Ozuna and is a perreo song which "later transitions to a hip-shaking cumbia". Lyrically it is about two people who are hooked on each other". It is written in the key of A minor at 96 beats-per-minute. "Como Yo" (transl. "Like Me") is a club-friendly experimental Latin pop song. The dance-pop influenced track has been described as exploring "a different side of Xtina's musical trajectory". It is written in the key of D♭ Major at 104 beats-per-minute. The album's first part ends with "La Reina" (transl. "The Queen"), a ranchera written in E Major at 174 beats-per-minute. The song was described by Aguilera as a "respectful response" to Vicente Fernández's 1973 rendition of "El Rey" (transl. "The King"). The song received widespread acclaim from critics, calling it the best song La Fuerza, and being named the album's anthem.

"Suéltame" (transl. "Let Me Go"), a collaboration with Argentine singer Tini, begins the album's second part, La Tormenta (transl. The Storm). The song is a "seducing, catchy mix of soft reggaetón and trap" with hints of bossa nova, written in F Minor at 138 beats-per-minute. "Suéltame" was called "a sultry tango-meets-urban collab where the lady takes matters into her own hands". The following track, "Brujería" (transl. "Witchcraft") is a slow song written in D♭ Major at 186 beats-per-minute. The following track, "Traguito" (transl. "A Little Drink") was described as orthodox pop. This is followed by the ranchera "Cuando Me Dé la Gana" (transl. "When I Want It"). A duet version of the song featuring Mexican singer Christian Nodal was also released as the closing track on the second disc of the album. The song is written in the key of D♭ Major at a tempo of 146 beats-per-minute. La Tormenta ends with "Te Deseo Lo Mejor" (transl. "I Wish You The Best"), a tropical song written in the key of D♭ Major at 186 beats-per-minute.

The final part begins with a spoken intro by Aguilera in which she noted in a Billboard interview saying that it is "about finding closure and understanding that everybody has a different story that leads us to why things happen the way that they do and it's not meant for us to understand it". This is followed by the song, "No Es Que Te Extrañe" (transl. "It's Not That I Miss You") in which Aguilera sings about finding peace, closure and forgiveness for her estranged abusive father. "No Es Que Te Extrañe" is a pasillo song. It is written in D♭ Major at 184 beats-per-minute.

== Title and artwork ==
The album title and original artwork were revealed on the day of the album's initial release on May 31, 2022. Naming the album after her father's surname, Aguilera expressed that she had the intention of "acknowledging, embracing and engaging with [her] roots "and with the intention to share "some closure in relation to [her] father", and to have her children reconnect with their heritage. On the album's title, Aguilera commented,

I am proud to be an Aguilera. This is a name that has been tried to be taken away from me on numerous occasions, you know, coming up in this business. But I was like 'No, I'm Aguilera.' I'm proud of who I am, I'm proud of my name, I'm proud of where I come from, my father being from Ecuador. It was important. I mean why not come full circle and on all of the EPs and close it on a name. My name I'm so proud to own.

The artwork used for the original release was a black and white image that portrayed Aguilera wearing a white dress, seen through a balcony archway with her face obscured by a shadow. On June 29, 2022, the artwork was changed to feature a front on view of Aguilera as a statue in a similar setting. The top of the archway displayed "Aguilera", in all caps. Nina Hernandez, writer for the Houston Chronicle, noted comparisons between the album artwork for Aguilera and the Mother Guadalupe.

== Release ==
Following the completion of the album, Aguilera held an interview with Insider in September 2021, where she first revealed the plan to release the album in separate parts, saying: "We're going to spread the music out — like six different songs released within, you know, throughout the next year. So there will be new material consistently added. On October 4, 2021, Aguilera's website featured a black screen with the text "Redescubriendo raices. Nos vemos pronto!" (transl. "Rediscovering roots. See you soon!"). On October 18, she posted a teaser video of the album's lead single, "Pa Mis Muchachas", and its music video.

In an interview with the Los Angeles Times following the release of the lead single, Aguilera revealed that the first part of the album would be titled La Fuerza (transl. The Strength). La Fuerza was released as an EP on January 21, 2022, as a digital download and on streaming services. The album's second part, La Tormenta (transl. The Storm), was announced alongside the single "Suéltame", and was expected to be released as an EP on May 27, 2022. Days after the announcement, Aguilera took to her Instagram story to announce that the EP would be postponed following the mass shooting at Robb Elementary School in Uvalde, Texas. La Tormenta was eventually released on May 30.

Aguilera was released digitally by Sony Music Latin on May 31, 2022, featuring only the songs from La Fuerza and La Tormenta in organized separate discs, and an extra version of "Cuando Me Dé la Gana" with Christian Nodal included as the final track of the second disc. The following day, Aguilera confirmed that the album would have a final part, titled La Luz (transl. The Light). On September 27, 2022, she hosted "Premiere Party with Christina Aguilera" as part of Billboard's Latin Music Week, where she premiered "No Es Que Te Extrañe". On September 30, La Luz was released as a dual single, consisting of a spoken word intro, and "No Es Que Te Extrañe". La Luz was simultaneously added as the third disc of the album's standard track list. The album was originally scheduled to be released in CD format on December 2, 2022, but was later pushed to June 2, 2023.

== Promotion ==
=== Singles and music videos ===
"Pa Mis Muchachas" (transl. "For My Girls") was released on October 22, 2021, as the lead single from the album. The song is a collaboration with Becky G, Nicki Nicole and features Argentine singer-songwriter Nathy Peluso. "Pa Mis Muchachas" debuted and peaked at number three on the Billboard Latin Digital Song Sales on the chart issue dated November 6, 2021, and was certified platinum (Latin field) by the Recording Industry Association of America (RIAA). "Somos Nada" (transl. "We Are Nothing") was released as the second single on November 18, 2021, coinciding with her performance at the 22nd Annual Latin Grammy Awards. Music videos for both "Somos Nada" and "Pa Mis Muchachas" were filmed simultaneously in Los Angeles and were released with their respective singles. They were directed by Alexandre Moors and tell a continuous story, with "Somos Nada" serving as a sequel to "Pa Mis Muchachas".

"Santo" (transl. "Saint") featuring Puerto Rican singer and rapper Ozuna was released as the third single from the album on January 20, 2022, one day before the release of La Fuerza. The music video for the song was directed by Nuno Gomez and is a continuation of the storyline in "Pa Mis Muchachas" and "Somos Nada". An alternate video for the song was released on June 15, 2022. "Santo" was certified platinum in the Latin field by the RIAA. "Suéltame" (transl. "Let Me Go") with Tini was announced as the fourth single, alongside the announcement of its parent EP, La Tormenta. It was postponed until its release alongside La Tormenta on May 30, 2022. The murder mystery themed music video was first shown during Aguilera's performance of the song at the Mallorca Live Festival and was eventually released on July 22, 2022.

"No Es Que Te Extrañe" (transl. "It's Not That I Miss You") (Note: The single was officially released under the name La Luz (transl. The Light), featuring "Intro (La Luz)" and "No Es Que Te Extrañe".) was announced and released as a dual single along with "Intro (La Luz)" on September 30, 2022. A music video, which Aguilera co-directed, was also released and depicted her childhood with her abusive father. While not officially a single, a music video for "La Reina" (transl. "The Queen"), was released on May 6, 2022.

=== Live performances ===
Aguilera attended the 22nd Latin Grammy Awards in Las Vegas on November 18, 2021, where she performed the album's first two singles, "Pa Mis Muchachas" and "Somos Nada" for the first time. Starting the performance with "Somos Nada", she was joined by piano player Julio Reyes Copello, before singin "Pa Mis Muchachas" alongside Becky G, Nicki Nicole and Nathy Peluso. She later performed the medley during her set at the World AIDS Day Concert LA Revival on December 1, 2022. In honor of receiving the inaugural award for People's Music Icon at the 47th People's Choice Awards, Aguilera performed a medley of her songs, including "Somos Nada".

Several of the songs on the album were performed on Aguilera's headlining sets in festivals throughout 2022, including the Cap Roig Festival in Calella de Palafrugell, the Starlite Festival in Marbella, and the Brighton Pride festival in Brighton and Hove. The festivals were part of her first promotional tour in support of Aguilera, titled EU / UK Summer Series. The tour also featured three arena concerts in Scarborough, Liverpool, and London, where Union J served as the opening act.

On September 29, 2022, Aguilera received the Billboard Spirit of Hope Award at the 2022 Billboard Latin Music Awards, and performed "La Reina" in a similar setting to the song's music video. Aguilera alongside Christian Nodal performed their collaborative version of "Cuando Me Dé la Gana" for the first time at the 23rd Annual Latin Grammy Awards on November 17, 2022, where Aguilera also received the award for Best Traditional Pop Vocal Album. The performance's theme was inspired by the musical West Side Story.

== Reception ==
=== Critical response ===
Professional ratings
Review scores
Source	Rating
AllMusic	4/5 stars

Aguilera was praised for Aguilera's vocal performance and her ability to fuse different Latin American music genres. Lucas Villa of Latina, praised Aguilera for giving it "her all on this album that pays homage to her Latina roots", and particularly applauded her "mighty voice" on the song "Cuando Me Dé la Gana", while BroadwayWorld writer Michael Major said that Aguilera "honoured her Latin roots in the best possible way", and complimented the album's ability to pay tribute to Latin music "without losing that essence that has made her one of the most important and respected artists of her generation". Neil Z. Yeung from AllMusic gave Aguilera a four out of five star rating, calling the album "a refreshing burst of artistry and heart from the Y2K generation's strongest voice" and hailed it as "one of the strongest statements" for Aguilera since her early work. A review from Pollstar called the album a "triumphant comeback to the Latin market", also adding that Aguilera had "proved her powerful vocal prowess is not limited to one language". In the official write-up for the Grammy Awards website, Bianca Gracie praised Aguilera's vocal performance in the album as "more confident than ever before, as she celebrated her rich heritage". She also noted that "Aguilera continues to flex her versatility and vulnerability [with the album]". Jeanette Hernandez of Remezcla regarded it an "A-list effort".

Villa later stated that "LatinXtina was a bicultural force to behold this year" in a year-end review for Uproxx, considering Aguilera as one of the ten best Latin albums of 2022. Billboard's Sigal Ratner-Arias shared the same sentiment, calling it "an instant classic". TV Azteca listed Aguilera among the twenty-five best Latin albums of the year. Writing for Houston Chronicle, Nina Hernandez ranked Aguilera at number five on the list of the ten best albums of 2022, saying that the album was "perhaps her most authentic work", and that "it will stick out in her catalog for years to come". PopSugar included Aguilera on its list of the most anticipated albums of 2023. (Note: The album was originally released digitally, first in May 2022, then in its complete form in September, while physical formats were released in June 2023.) Moises Mendez II of Time called the album "a project that shows just how well [Aguilera] understands the Latin music space", and praised her "gorgeous, bombastic vocals" on the "clear standout" song from the album, "La Reina", naming it one of the best Latin songs of the year.

Year-end list rankings for Aguilera
Publication	List	Rank	Ref.
AllMusic	Favorite Latin & Global Albums	—N/a	
Billboard	Best Latin Albums of 2022	—N/a	
Houston Chronicle	Best Albums of 2022	5	
TV Azteca	The 25 Best Latin Albums of 2022	6	
Uproxx	The Best Latin Albums of 2022	—N/a	

=== Accolades ===
At the 23rd Annual Latin Grammy Awards, the album was nominated for Album of the Year and won the award for Best Traditional Pop Vocal Album, while "Pa Mis Muchachas" received nominations for Record and Song of the Year, and was nominated alongside "Santo" for Best Urban Fusion/Performance. The duet version of "Cuando Me Dé la Gana" with Christian Nodal was nominated in the Best Regional Mexican Song category. With a total of seven nominations, Aguilera was the second most nominated female artist, behind Rosalía's eight, and third overall, tying Jorge Drexler. Aguilera also received two Grammy Award nominations for Best Latin Pop Album and Best Immersive Audio Album at the 65th Annual Grammy Awards which Entertainment Tonight noted as "a major moment in Latin music". At the 24th Annual Latin Grammy Awards, "No Es Que Te Extrañe" was nominated for Record of the Year.

Accolades received by Aguilera
Year	Ceremony	Category	Result	Ref.
2022	23rd Annual Latin Grammy Awards	Album of the Year	Nominated	
2022	23rd Annual Latin Grammy Awards	Best Traditional Pop Vocal Album	Won	
2022	Top 50 Music Awards	Album of the Year	Nominated	
2023	65th Annual Grammy Awards	Best Latin Pop Album	Nominated	
2023	65th Annual Grammy Awards	Best Immersive Audio Album	Nominated	

== Commercial performance ==
The album peaked at number 16 on the Billboard US Latin Pop Albums chart and at number 70 on the German's Digital Albums.

== Track listing ==
Aguilera track listing
No.	Title	Writer(s)	Producer(s)	Length
1.	"Ya Llegué"	Christina Aguilera; Kat Dahlia; Juan Morelli; Jon Leone	Rafa Arcaute; Federico Vindver; JonTheProducer	3:03
2.	"Pa Mis Muchachas" (with Becky G and Nicki Nicole featuring Nathy Peluso)	Aguilera; Dahlia; Yasmil Marrufo; Jorge Luis Chacín; Yoel Henríquez; Natalia Peluso; Nicole Denise Cucco; Rebbeca Marie Gomez	Arcaute; Vindver	3:36
3.	"Somos Nada"	Aguilera; Mario Domm; Sharlene Taulé; Vindver	Arcaute; Vindver	3:01
4.	"Santo" (with Ozuna)	Aguilera; Ozuna; DallasK; Gale; Josh Barrios	Arcaute; Vindver; DallasK; Barrios	3:03
5.	"Como Yo"	Aguilera; Dhalia; Morelli; Vindver; Arcaute; Gino the Ghost; Tobias Wincorn	Arcaute; Vindver; Wincorn	2:46
6.	"La Reina"	Aguilera; Servando Primera; Santiago Castillo; Luigi Castillo; Marrufo	Arcaute; Vindver; Marrufo	3:48
7.	"Suéltame" (with Tini)	Martina Stoessel; Aguilera; Dahlia; Mauricio Rengifo; Andrés Torres; Vindver; Arcaute	Rengifo; Torres; Arcaute; Vindver	2:53
8.	"Brujería"	Aguilera; Gale; Salomón Villada Hoyos; Miguel Andrés Martinez Perea; Pablo Preciado; Vindver; Arcaute	Feid; Slow; Arcaute; Vindver	2:45
9.	"Traguito"	Aguilera; Rafael Rodríguez; Daniel Rondón; Andy Clay; Arcaute; Vindver; Dahlia	HoneyBoos; Clay; Arcaute; Vindver	3:11
10.	"Cuando Me Dé la Gana"	Aguilera; Dahlia; Henríquez; Chacín; Marrufo; Arcaute; Vindver	Arcaute; Vindver; Marrufo	3:26
11.	"Te Deseo lo Mejor"	Edgar Barrera; Luis Barrera Jr.; Juan Diego Linares; Aguilera; Elena Rose; Arcaute; Vindver	E. Barrera; L. Barrera Jr.; Linares; Vindver; Arcaute	2:36
12.	"Cuando Me Dé la Gana" (with Christian Nodal)	Aguilera; Dahlia; Henríquez; Chacín; Marrufo; Arcaute; Vindver	Arcaute; Vindver; Marrufo	3:26
13.	"Intro (La Luz)"	Aguilera	Arcaute; Vindver; Jean Rodríguez	0:40
14.	"No Es Que Te Extrañe"	Aguilera; Barrera; Preciado; Marrufo; Arcaute; Vindver; Rodríguez	Arcaute; Vindver	4:43
Total length:				43:03

Notes

- Co-production for all tracks is handled by Afo Verde.
- Vocal production for all tracks is handled by Rodríguez.
- On digital releases, the album is separated into three discs:
  - Disc one, La Fuerza (1–6).
  - Disc two, La Tormenta (7–12).
  - Disc three, La Luz (13–14).
- Tracks 13 and 14 from disc three La Luz were not included on the first digital release of Aguilera.

== Personnel and credits ==
=== Musicians ===
- Christina Aguilera – vocals
- Rafa Arcaute – producer, arrangement, keyboards, programming (all tracks); percussion (2)
- Édgar Barrera – producer (11), keyboards (11), programmer (11)
- Luis Barrera Jr. – producer (11), keyboards (11), programmer (11)
- Luigi Castillo – background vocals (6)
- Santiago Castillo – background vocals (6)
- Jorge Luis Chacín – background vocals (2, 10, 12)
- Andy Clay – producer (9), keyboards (9), programmer (9)
- Kat Dahlia – background vocals (2, 10, 12)
- DallasK – arrangement, keyboards, programming (4)
- Feid – producer (8), keyboards (8), programmer (8)
- Roland Gajate – percussion (14)
- Yoel Henríquez – background vocals (2, 10, 12)
- Honeyboos (Daniel Rondón and Rafael Rodríguez) – producer (9)
- JonTheProducer – arrangement, keyboards, programming (1)
- Juan Diego Linares – producer (11)
- Yasmil Marrufo – background vocals (2, 6, 10, 12); bass, guitar (6, 14), producer (10, 12), keyboards (10, 12), programmer (10, 12)
- Christian Nodal – featured vocals (12)
- Servando Primera – background vocals (6)
- Mauricio Rengifo – producer (7), keyboards (7), programmer(7)
- Rafael Rodríguez – keyboards (9), programmer (9)
- Matt Rollings – piano (3)
- Davide Rosi – strings (14)
- Slow – producer (8), keyboards (8), programmer (8)
- Tini – co-lead vocals (7)
- Andrés Torres – producer (7), keyboards (7), programmer (7)
- Afo Verde – co-producer
- Federico Vindver – arrangement, keyboards, programming (all tracks), percussion (2), producer

=== Technical ===
- José Aponte – recording (4)
- Rafa Arcuate – recording engineer
- Édgar Barrera – recording engineer (11)
- Luis Barrera Jr. – recording engineer (11)
- Rachel Blum – assistant engineer (14)
- Ray Charles Brown Jr. – recording engineer (7–11, 14)
- Andy Clay – recording engineer (9)
- Morgan David – assistant engineer (1, 5)
- Jaycen Joshua – mastering, mixing
- Juan Diego Linares – recording engineer (11)
- Yasmil Marrufo – recording (6, 10)
- Mauricio Rengifo – recording engineer (7)
- Jacob Richards – assistant engineer (14)
- DJ Riggins – assistant engineer (14)
- Jean Rodríguez – recording engineer, vocal producer
- Mike Seaberg – mixing engineer, mastering engineer
- Slow – recording engineer (8)
- Andrés Torres – recording engineer (7)
- Felipe Trujillo – engineering assistance, recording engineer (14)
- Federico Vindver – recording

== Charts ==
Weekly chart performance for Aguilera
Chart (2022–2023)	Peak position
French Physical Albums (SNEP)	137
German Digital Albums (GfK Entertainment)	70
Spanish Albums (Promusicae)	69
Taiwanese Albums (Five Music)	6
US Top Current Album Sales (Billboard)	83
US Latin Pop Albums (Billboard)	16

== Release history ==
List of release dates by region, version, formats, label and references
Region	Date	Format(s)	Edition	Label	Ref.
Various	May 31, 2022	Digital download; streaming	Double album	Sony Latin	
Various	September 30, 2022	Digital download; streaming	Triple album	Sony Latin	
Various	June 2, 2023	CD	Triple album	Sony Latin	
Various	October 27, 2023	Vinyl	Triple album	Sony Latin	

== See also ==
- 2022 in Latin music
