= El Rey (song) =

1971 song by José Alfredo Jiménez

Song by José Alfredo Jiménez

from the album El Rey
- Language: Spanish
- English title: The King
- Released: 1971
- Recorded: 1970/71
- Genre: Rancheras; mariachi
- Length: 2:10
- Songwriter: José Alfredo Jiménez

"El Rey" ("The King") is a 1971 song by Mexican singer José Alfredo Jiménez. It is one of his best known songs and a Latin Grammy Hall of Fame recipient. The song is about "a macho guy convinced his rough-and-tumble life doesn't preclude him from remaining the king among his peers".

A chart published by Record World credited "El Rey" as reaching number one in Mexico in 1974, a year after Jiménez' death.

"El Rey" remains a staple of Ranchera and traditional Mexican music. The song has been covered by various artists, including Vicente Fernández - often considered the most well-known version of "El Rey" - his son Alejandro Fernández, Luis Miguel, and Maná.

== Other versions ==
"El Rey"

Song by Vicente Fernández

from the album El Ídolo de Mexico
- Language: Spanish
- English title: The King
- Released: 1973
- Recorded: 1973
- Genre: Rancheras; mariachi
- Length: 2:34
- Label: Sony
- Songwriter: José Alfredo Jiménez

The song has been covered by various artists. The following are other notable versions.

=== Vicente Fernández version ===
The song has been recorded by several artists including Vicente Fernández whose version peaked at number 40 on the Hot Latin Songs chart.

In 2025, Fernández's 1973 recording of "El Rey" was selected by the Library of Congress for preservation in the National Recording Registry.

=== Christina Aguilera version ===
In 2022, American singer Christina Aguilera released "La Reina" (transl. "The Queen") from her ninth studio album, Aguilera (2022) as a "respectful response" to Fernández' version of "El Rey". In her version, Aguilera emphasizes how a king will always be a king, but that he's nothing without his queen. Aguilera's rendition received acclaim and reached 9 on the US Latin Digital Songs.
