= Cuando Me Dé la Gana =

2022 song by Christina Aguilera

Song by Christina Aguilera (solo or with Christian Nodal)

from the album Aguilera
- Language: Spanish
- English title: "When I Want It'
- Released: May 30, 2022 (solo) May 31, 2022 (duet with Christian Nodal)
- Recorded: 2021
- Studio: Art House (Miami, FL)
- Genre: Mariachi ranchera
- Length: 3:26
- Label: Sony Latin
- Songwriters: Christina Aguilera; Federico Vindver; Jorge Luis Chacín; Kat Dahlia; Rafa Arcaute; Yasmil Marrufo; Yoel Henríquez
- Producers: Federico Vindver; Rafa Arcaute; Yasmil Marrufo

Audio videos
- "Cuando Me Dé la Gana" (solo) on YouTube
- "Cuando Me Dé la Gana" (with Christian Nodal) on YouTube

"Cuando Me Dé la Gana" (transl. "When I Want It") is a song recorded by American singer Christina Aguilera for her ninth studio and second Spanish-language album Aguilera (2022). It was written by Aguilera herself, alongside collaborators Federico Vindver, Jorge Luis Chacín, Kat Dahlia, Rafa Arcaute, Yasmil Marrufo, and Yoel Henríquez. The song was produced by Vindver, Arcaute and Marrufo, and it was co-produced by Afo Verde, while the vocal production was handled by Jean Rodríguez. Originally recorded solely by Aguilera, "Cuando Me Dé la Gana" was created during the album's recording sessions, held in early 2021 in Miami, Florida. This version of the song would be released on May 30, 2022 as the fourth track on the extended play (EP) release of the album's second chapter, La Tormenta. The following day a new version of the song with Mexican singer Christian Nodal as a guest vocalist was released as the twelfth track on the album's track list.

"Cuando Me Dé la Gana" is a ranchera song. Despite being featured on the album's La Tormenta chapter, which focuses on vulnerability, the song's lyrics are empowering, with Aguilera telling someone that she can stop loving them whenever she wants to. The duet version of the song reached the top 15 on the Billboard Latin Digital Song Sales chart in the US, and received a nomination for Best Regional Mexican Song at the 23rd Annual Latin Grammy Awards, where Aguilera and Nodal performed the song for the first time.

== Background and composition ==
Having started work on her second Spanish-language album in 2017, Aguilera relocated to Miami in early 2021 to begin the album's recording process. She revealed that her intention was to pay tribute to Latin music genres through the album's sound. "Cuando Me Dé la Gana" was written as a ranchera, a genre of traditional music originating from Mexico and mariachi music. It was written in the key of D♭ Major at a tempo of 146 beats-per-minute.

The song's lyrics describe a situation where the singers tell their lover that they are "going to stop loving [them]" when they want to, because they are the ones "in charge" of their heart. According to Entertainment Tonight, the song tells the story of a woman taking charge in a relationship.

== Reception ==
=== Critical response ===
"Cuando Me Dé la Gana" received positive reviews from music critics. In his review of Aguilera for Latina, Lucas Villa praised the Nodal version of the song, complimenting Aguilera's "mighty voice", and Nodal's ability to compliment her well "as they both give passionate performances that are rooted in heartbreak." Billboard's Sigal Ratner-Arias called the song "a Mexican masterpiece". Michael Major of BroadwayWorld called the song a "spectacular ranchera".

=== Accolades ===
Accolades received by "Cuando Me Dé la Gana" (Christian Nodal version)
Year	Ceremony	Category	Result	Ref.
2022	Latin Grammy Awards	Best Regional Mexican Song	Nominated	

== Commercial performance ==
The duet version of the song peaked at number 15 on the Billboard Latin Digital Song Sales chart in the United States on the chart dated December 3, 2022.

== Music video ==
On November 16, 2022, Aguilera teased a short black and white clip from the music video for the solo version of the song. A music video for the solo and duet version with Mexican singer Christian Nodal of the song was expected to be released, if the single is confirmed via radio in some countries.

== Live performances ==
The first performance of "Cuando Me Dé la Gana" occurred at the 23rd Annual Latin Grammy Awards, held on November 17, 2022, where Aguilera performed the song alongside Nodal in a West Side Story inspired setting.
