= Ya Llegué =

2022 song by Christina Aguilera

Song by Christina Aguilera

from the album Aguilera
- Language: Spanish
- English title: "I'm Here"
- Released: January 21, 2022
- Recorded: 2021
- Studio: Art House (Miami)
- Genre: Latin; reggaeton
- Length: 3:03
- Label: Sony Latin
- Songwriters: Christina Aguilera; Jon Leone; Juan Morelli; Kat Dahlia
- Producers: JonTheProducer; Rafa Arcaute; Federico Vindver

Audio video
- "Ya Llegué" on YouTube

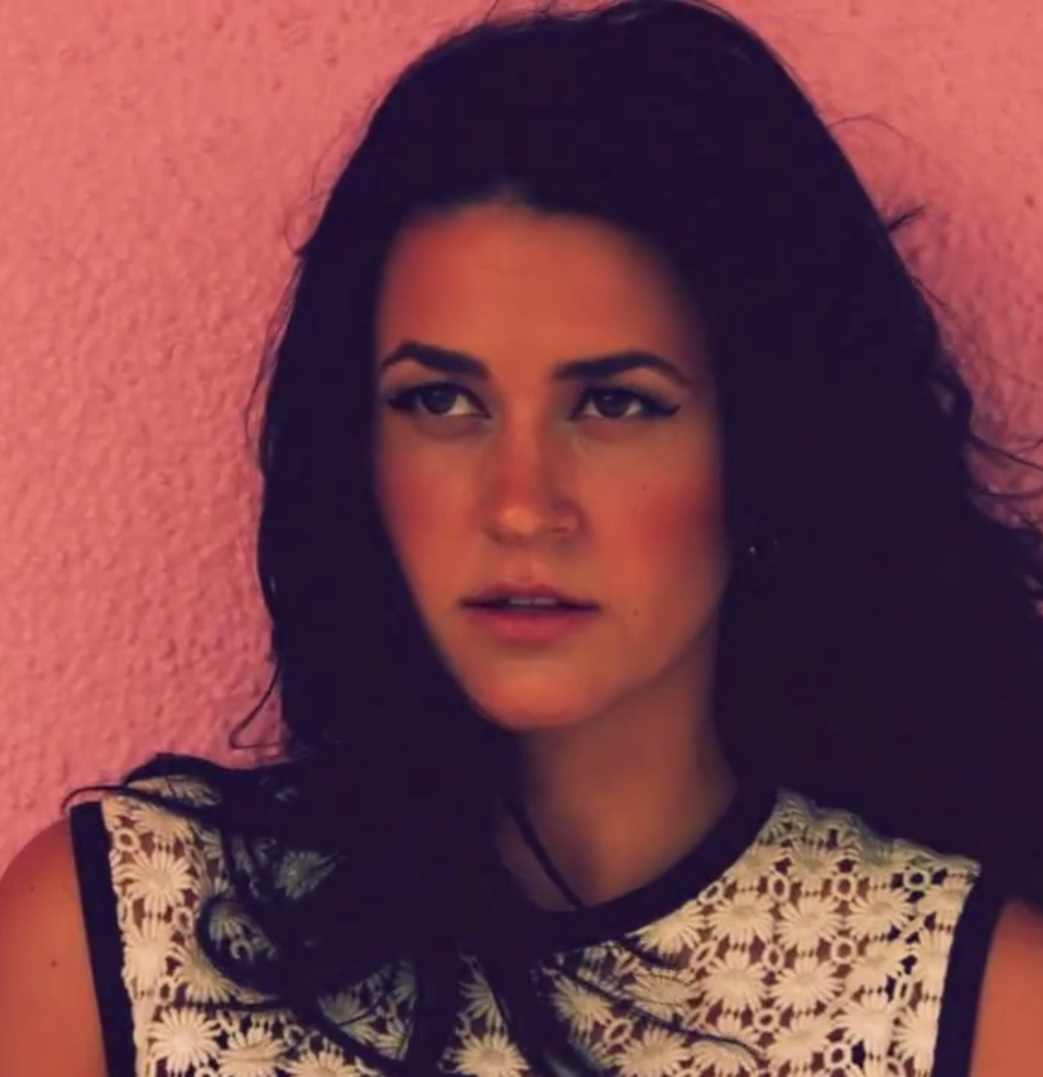
Kat Dahlia, who co-wrote the song.

"Ya Llegué" (transl. "I'm Here") is a song recorded by American singer Christina Aguilera for her ninth studio and second Spanish-language album, Aguilera (2022). It was written by Aguilera, Jon Leone, Juan Morelli and Kat Dahlia, and its production was handled by the latter, alongside JonTheProducer, Rafa Arcaute, Federico Vindver. The song was then recorded in 2021 and serves as the first track on the album's first of three parts, La Fuerza (transl. The Strength), which was released as a separate extended play (EP).

== Background and composition ==
"Ya Llegué" was recorded along with the rest of the album at Art House studios in Miami in early 2021. It was revealed to be part of the La Fuerza EP by Billboard on January 19, 2022, as the tracklist was disclosed, and then was released on January 21, as the opening track from the extended play.

The reggaeton song lasts for a duration of three minutes and three seconds. It is written in the key of E♭ minor at 95 beats-per-minute. It combines unconventional, experimental rhythmic patterns, and incorporates Latin and electronic music with futuristic R&B and flamenco chill.

In the song, whose original title can be translated as "I'm Here", Aguilera assures her fans and listeners that she has returned to the Spanish-language music scene. In "Ya Llegué", Aguilera also refers to her 1999 hit single "Genie in a Bottle", or more precisely, to its Latin pop version "Genio Atrapado", from the 2000 album Mi Reflejo. Kat Dahlia — responsible for songwriting along with Aguilera, Juan Morelli and Jon Leone a.k.a. JonTheProducer — also co-wrote La Fuerza's lead single, "Pa Mis Muchachas".

== Critical reception ==
Upon release, "Ya Llegué" received positive reviews from music critics. Writing for Rolling Stone, Lucas Villa called it an "alluring romp" and praised its lyrical homage to Aguilera's 1999 number-one single, "Genie in a Bottle". Atwood Magazine's Josh Weiner shared the same sentiment and described the tribute as a "sly" wordplay. Billboard hailed it as a "sultry futuristic track" and also noted the reference to "Genie in a Bottle", saying that it "samples her 1999 hit but changes the narrative a bit". Pip Ellwood-Hughes from Entertainment Focus considered "Ya Llegué" to be a "strong opener" of La Fuerza and complimented the song's production, writing that "Aguilera excels delivering off-beat rhythms with her vocals as she navigates the beat". Genna Rivieccio from Culled Culture lauded the track for its "thumping bassline and playful lyrics".

Enrique Cerros of NEIU Independent thought the song was an "innovative reggaetón", and called Aguilera's Spanish pronunciation and enunciation delivery "perfect". He further noted that "Ya Llegué" was a "fantastic introduction to the start of the EP". Prime News editor Albert Nowicki commented that "the song echoes the rhythm and blues recordings from Aguilera's previous album, Liberation — it's sassy and features high-quality production. It's a song with a flavor that only Aguilera can deliver." Víctor Berzal de Miguel from Cultura Diversa praised the song for its "seductive, slow reggaeton rhythm" and also Aguilera for her Spanish pronunciation. He went on to say that "the EP [La Fuerza] couldn't start off better". Jordi Bardají from Jenesaispop opined that "Ya Llegué" is one of the best songs on La Fuerza. He called it a "hit" and thought that the "Genie in a Bottle" reference was "well-placed".

== Commercial performance ==
In February 2022 "Ya Llegué" debuted and peaked at number seven on the Billboard Latin Digital Song Sales chart, becoming Aguilera's seventh top ten hit on the chart.

== Live performances ==
The song was included in the setlist for Aguilera's 2023 EuroPride concert in Malta, as well as during her concerts at the O_{2} Arena (London) and at the Flemington Racecourse (Melbourne). It was used as an interlude, followed directly by the singer's Spanish-language single "Santo".

== Credits and personnel ==
Recording and management

- Recorded at Art House (Miami, Florida)
- Mixed at Canton House Studios, Studio City, CA
- Published by Warner–Tamerlane Publishing Corp. (BMI), Xtina Maria Music (BMI)
- All rights adm. by Warner–Tamerlane Publishing Corp. (BMI)

Personnel

- Christina Aguilera – vocals, songwriting
- Jon Leone a.k.a. JonTheProducer – production, songwriting, keyboards, programming, performance arrangement
- Rafa Arcaute – production, keyboards, programming, performance arrangement, recording engineering, A&R direction
- Federico Vindver – production, keyboards, programming, performance arrangement, recording engineering
- Kat Dahlia – songwriting
- Juan Morelli – songwriting
- Afo Verde – co-production, A&R direction
- Jean Rodríguez – vocal production, recording engineering
- Jaycen Joshua – mixing, mastering
- Mike Seaberg – mix engineering
- Ray Charles Brown Jr. – recording engineering
- Felipe Trujillo – additional engineering (assistant)
- Morgan Davis – additional engineering (assistant)
- Micheline Medina – project management
- Oriana Hidalgo – A&R management
- Alejandro Jiménez – A&R policy
- Jacob Richards, DJ Riggins, Rachel Blum – assistants

Credits adapted from Aguilera.

== Charts ==
| Chart (2022) | Peak position |
|---|---|
| US Latin Digital Songs (Billboard) | 7 |
