= La Tormenta (EP) =

Extended play by Christina Aguilera (2022)

EP by Christina Aguilera
- Released: May 30, 2022
- Studio: Art House; Criteria
- Genre: Latin
- Length: 14:13
- Language: Spanish
- Label: Sony Latin
- Producer: Rafa Arcaute; Édgar Barrera; Luis Barrera Jr.; Feid; HoneyBoos; Juan Diego Linares; Yasmil Marrufo; Mauricio Rengifo; Slow; Andrés Torres; Federico Vindver

Christina Aguilera chronology
| La Fuerza (2022) | La Tormenta (2022) | Aguilera (2022) |

Singles from La Tormenta
- 1. "Suéltame" Released: May 30, 2022

La Tormenta (transl. The Storm) is the second solo and Spanish-language extended play by American singer Christina Aguilera. It was released through Sony Music Latin on May 30, 2022 as the second part of her ninth studio and second Spanish-language album Aguilera (2022), following up La Fuerza. It is also her third extended play overall. Aguilera decided to release the album in an unconventional way, one part at a time. While La Fuerza focused on strength and female empowerment, the content on La Tormenta is centered around vulnerability and heartbreak. Argentine singer Tini provides guest vocals on the EP's lead single "Suéltame".

== Background and recording ==
While recording her second Spanish album in Miami, Aguilera thought about a way to combat the fact that she takes "a long time between records", wanting to find a new way to release music. She developed the concept of a three part album, with each part reflecting a different theme: strength, vulnerability and healing. The first part of the album, La Fuerza (transl. "The Strength") which was about strength and womanhood, was released on January 21, 2022. The full Spanish album, Aguilera was released on May 31, 2022, and features all of the songs from the EP La Tormenta as well as its predecessor La Fuerza, and a new version of "Cuando Me Dé la Gana" featuring Christian Nodal.

== Release and reception ==
The release of the EP was postponed for a few days due to the Uvalde school shooting. La Tormenta premiered on May 30, 2022, and was released commercially for digital download and on streaming platforms worldwide by Sony Music Latin.

Billboard's Jessica Ruiz commented that "La Tormenta is home to five tracks that not only continue to showcase Xtina’s powerful vocals singing in Spanish, but also her experimental ability to tap into reggaeton and other Latin rhythmic melodies while keeping her pop essence." Reviewing La Tormenta for Prime News, Albert Nowicki noted: "The extended play consists of five songs, each characterized by high-quality production and sure to leave no one indifferent. In her new tracks, Aguilera sings about the storm raging in her heart, about those whom she loves and what she regrets, about relationships and forbidden feelings. She confronts the past and celebrates the present. This is an album for every occasion, every emotional tone." He further praised "Brujería", its lyrics and its theme of a toxic relationship, and also called "Traguito" a "catchy anthem". Stephanie Martinez, a journalist for CusicaPlus, opined that La Tormenta was created by "renowned composers and producers" and features an "excellent collaboration" with Tini.

== Music and singles ==
"Suéltame" with Tini was released as the first single from the EP and as the fourth single from Aguilera on May 30, 2022. It was released simultaneously with its parent EP and one day before Aguilera. A music video has been teased by Aguilera.

== Accolades ==
A ranchera from the EP, "Cuando Me Dé la Gana", was nominated for Best Regional Song at the 23rd Annual Latin Grammy Awards, and has been called a "masterpiece" by Billboard magazine's Sigal Ratner-Arias.

== Track listing ==
La Tormenta track listing
| No. | Title | Writer(s) | Producer(s) | Length |
|---|---|---|---|---|
| 1. | "Suéltame" (with Tini) | Aguilera; Martina Stoessel; Andrés Torres; Vindver; Mauricio Rengifo; Rafael Arcaute; Kat Dahlia | Torres; Vindver; Rengifo; Arcaute | 2:53 |
| 2. | "Brujería" | Aguilera; Vindver; Gale; Miguel Andrés Martinez; Pablo Preciado; Arcaute; Salomón Villada Hoyos | Vindver; Feid; Arcaute; Slow | 2:45 |
| 3. | "Traguito" | Aguilera; Andy Clay; Daniel Rondón; Vindver; Dahlia; Arcaute; Rafael Rodríguez | Clay; HoneyBoos (Rondón and R. Rodríguez); Vindver; Arcaute | 3:11 |
| 4. | "Cuando Me Dé la Gana" | Aguilera; Vindver; Jorge Luis Chacín; Dahlia; Arcaute; Yasmil Marrufo; Yoel Henríquez | Vindver; Arcaute; Marrufo | 3:26 |
| 5. | "Te Deseo lo Mejor" | Aguilera; Elena Rose; Vindver; Juan Diego Linares; Luis Barrera Jr.; Arcaute; Edgar Barrera | Vindver; Linares; L. Barrera Jr.; Arcaute; E. Barrera | 2:36 |
| Total length: | | | | 14:53 |

=== Notes ===
- All songs were co-produced by Afo Verde.
- All songs were vocally produced by Jean Rodríguez.

== Personnel ==
=== Musicians ===
- Christina Aguilera – lead vocals
- Rafa Arcuate – producer, keyboards, programmer
- Édgar Barrera – producer (5), keyboards (5), programmer (5)
- Luis Barrera Jr. – producer (5), keyboards (5), programmer (5)
- Jorge Luis Chacín – background vocals (4, 6)
- Andy Clay – producer (3), keyboards (3), programmer (3)
- Kat Dahlia – background vocals (4, 6)
- Feid – producer (2), keyboards (2), programmer (2)
- Yoel Henríquez – background vocals (4, 6)
- Honeyboos (Daniel Rondón and Rafael Rodríguez) – producer (3)
- Juan Diego Linares – producer (5)
- Yasmil Marufo – background vocals (4, 6), producer (4, 6), bass (4, 6), keyboards (4, 6), programmer (4, 6)
- Christian Nodal – featured vocals (6)
- Mauricio Rengifo – producer (1), keyboards (1), programmer (1)
- Rafael Rodríguez – keyboards (3), programmer (3)
- Slow – producer (2), keyboards (2), programmer (2)
- Tini – co-lead vocals (1)
- Andrés Torres – producer (1), keyboards (1), programmer (1)
- Afo Verde – co-producer
- Federico Vindver – producer, keyboards, programmer

=== Technicians ===
- Rafa Arcuate – recording engineer
- Édgar Barrera – recording engineer (5)
- Luis Barrera Jr. – recording engineer (5)
- Ray Charles Brown, Jr. – recording engineer (1–4)
- Andy Clay – recording engineer (3)
- Morgan David – assistant engineer
- Jaycen Joshua – mixing engineer, mastering engineer
- Juan Diego Linares – recording engineer (5)
- Yasmil Marufo – recording engineer (4)
- Jean Rodríguez – recording engineer, vocal producer
- Mauricio Rengifo – recording engineer (1)
- Rafael Rodríguez – recording engineer (3)
- Slow – recording engineer (2)
- Andrés Torres – recording engineer (1)
- Felipe Trujillo – assistant engineer
- Federico Vindver – recording engineer (1–4)

== Release history ==
Release history for La Tormenta
| Region | Date | Format | Label | Ref. |
|---|---|---|---|---|
| Various | May 30, 2022 | Digital download; streaming | Sony Latin | |
