= Pa Mis Muchachas =

2021 single by Christina Aguilera, Becky G and Nicki Nicole featuring Nathy Peluso

Single by Christina Aguilera, Becky G and Nicki Nicole featuring Nathy Peluso

from the album Aguilera
- Language: Spanish
- English title: "For My Girls"
- Released: October 22, 2021
- Recorded: February 2021
- Studio: Art House (Miami)
- Genre: Guaracha
- Length: 3:36
- Label: Sony Latin
- Songwriters: Christina Aguilera; Kat Dahlia; Yasmil Marrufo; Jorge Luis Chacín; Yoel Henríquez; Natalia Peluso; Nicole Denise Cucco; Rebbeca Gomez
- Producers: Rafa Arcaute; Federico Vindver

Christina Aguilera singles chronology
"Reflection" (2020)	"Pa Mis Muchachas" (2021)	"Somos Nada" (2021)

Becky G singles chronology
"Baila Así" (2021)	"Pa Mis Muchachas" (2021)	"Bella Ciao" (2021)

Nicki Nicole singles chronology
"Baby" (2021)	"Pa Mis Muchachas" (2021)	"Sabe" (2021)

Nathy Peluso singles chronology
"Ateo" (2021)	"Pa Mis Muchachas" (2021)	"Vivir Así Es Morir De Amor" (2021)

Music video
- "Pa Mis Muchachas" on YouTube

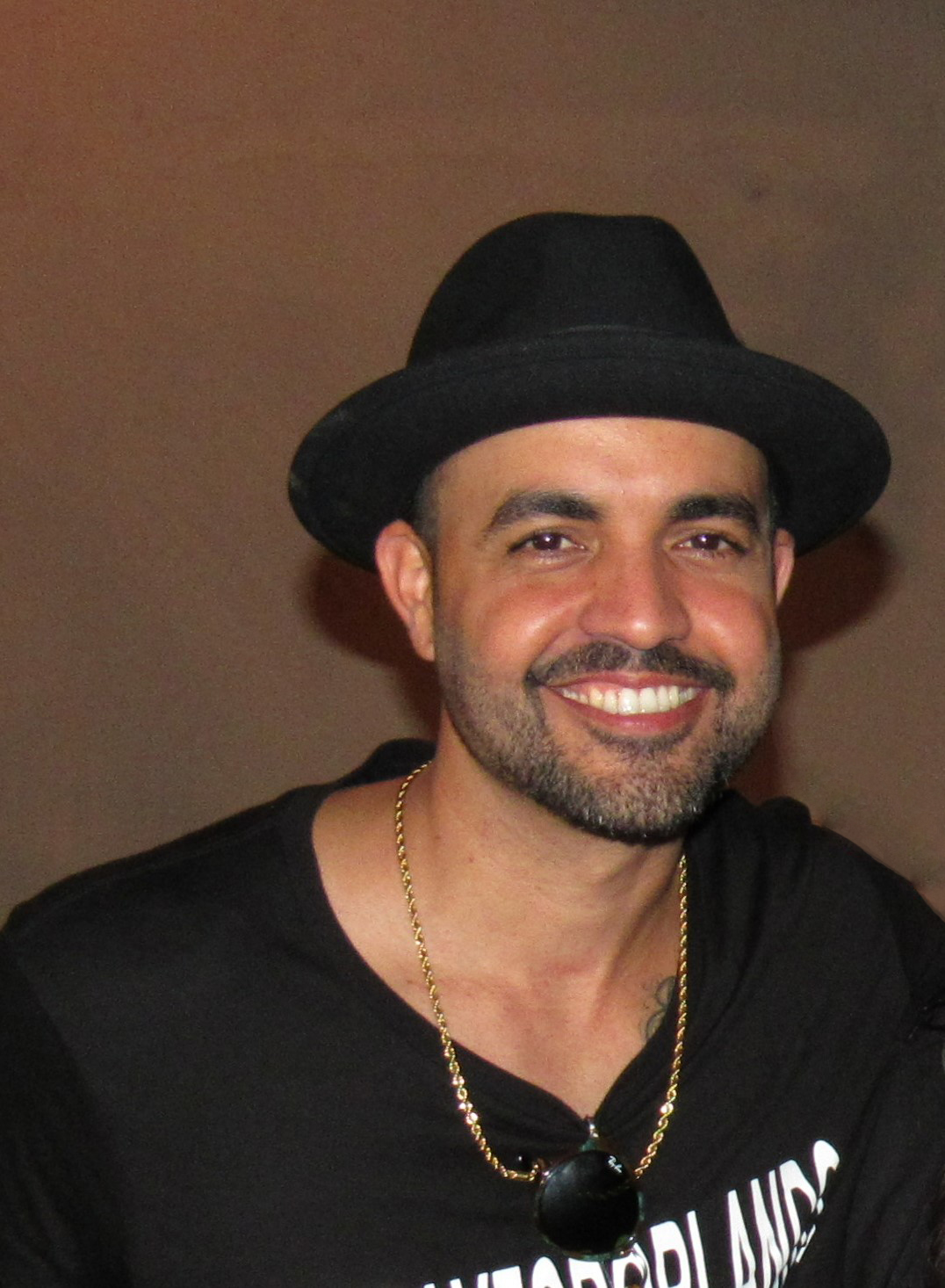
Jean Rodríguez handled the song's vocal production.

"Pa Mis Muchachas" is a song recorded by American singers Christina Aguilera, Becky G and Argentine rapper and singer Nicki Nicole featuring Argentine singer Nathy Peluso for the former's ninth studio and second Spanish-language album Aguilera (2022). It was written by the performers alongside Kat Dahlia, Yasmil Marrufo, Jorge Luis Chacín, and Yoel Henriquez. Its production was handled by Rafa Arcaute and Federico Vindver, co-produced by Afo Verde, and vocal production handled by Jean Rodríguez. The song was released through Sony Music Latin as the album's lead single on October 22, 2021, marking Aguilera's return to Spanish-language music after nine years.

Featured on the album's first part, La Fuerza (transl. The Strength), "Pa Mis Muchachas" follows La Fuerza's theme of celebrating womanhood and female empowerment. Musically, it is a guaracha song, and its lyrics focus on how a woman's strength is passed down through generations. The song was received positively by critics, being likened to Aguilera's 2001 rendition of "Lady Marmalade". Commercially, it reached number one in Taiwan, and was a top 20 hit on record charts in Mexico, Chile, Puerto Rico, Ecuador, El Salvador, Peru and Venezuela, among other Latin American countries. "Pa Mis Muchachas" has received a platinum certification (Latin field) by the Recording Industry Association of America (RIAA) as well as three nominations at the 23rd Annual Latin Grammy Awards, including for Record and Song of the Year.

== Production and composition ==
"Pa Mis Muchachas" is Aguilera's first single in Spanish since her rendition of "Hoy Tengo Ganas de Ti" with Alejandro Fernández in 2013. Aguilera began work on her second Spanish-language album in 2015, and later relocated to Miami, Florida in early 2021 to record the record. Recording sessions were held at Art House studios, starting in February 2021. "Pa Mis Muchachas" was the first song written and recorded for the album, during the first session. After being introduced to Becky G, Nicole and Peluso, Aguilera decided that they were the perfect collaborators for the song.

"Pa Mis Muchachas" is a guaracha song, a genre of music characterized by fast tempo which originated from Cuba. It is written in the key of A minor with a moderately fast tempo of 118 beats-per-minute. Like the rest of La Fuerza, the song's lyrical content focuses on female empowerment, serving as "an homage to women", with Aguilera noting that. The song talks about how a woman's strength is "something that gets passed down by generations". It was chosen as the lead single because it embraces Aguilera's "love of feeling like a unit". Because of its theme, "Pa Mis Muchachas" has been compared to previous songs with feministic undertones recorded by Aguilera — including "What a Girl Wants" and "Can't Hold Us Down".

== Release and promotion ==
After teasing the single through several teaser videos on her social media, Aguilera eventually announced "Pa Mis Muchachas" and Becky G, Nicole and Peluso as her collaborators on October 19, 2021. The song and its music video were released on October 22, 2021. The song was performed for the first time at the 22nd Annual Latin Grammy Awards, alongside Becky G, Nicole and Peluso. The performance was called a "decadent, grrl-power-filled showcase" by The Latin Recording Academy. "Pa Mis Muchachas" was performed solo for the first time at World AIDS Day Concert LA Revival, held by the AIDS Healthcare Foundation on December 1, 2021. It was then featured on Aguilera's 2022 EU/UK Summer Series promotional tour. Aguilera performed the song again during her live-streamed show at the Hollywood Palladium organized in celebration of the 35 year partnership between Citi and American Airlines on October 6, 2022.

== Critical reception ==
Upon release, the song received positive reviews. Harper's Bazaar writer Bianca Betancourt noted that "Aguilera's signature vocals shine over the infectious guaracha-style beat — a high-tempo genre that stems from Cuba" adding that "it's the best she's sounded in years". A Manila Standard writer also praised Aguilera's vocals noting that the track contains "simmering acoustic guitar threads around a head-nodding beat as [Aguilera's] instantly recognizable vocals ring out". They went on to say that her "show-stopping delivery" complimented the accompanying voices of Becky G, Nicki Nicole, and Nathy Peluso and that the song "unites some of the boldest powerhouses in Latin music and culture, heating up each verse". Paige Mastrandrea of Ocean Drive praised the song for its "nostalgic vibe" that the audiences were "craving from" Aguilera since her previous female collaboration — 2001's "Lady Marmalade", a sentiment also shared by Enrique Cerros of NEIU Independent. Billboard considered the song "a modern-day girl-power anthem that honors the Latinas that came before us", and Rolling Stone's Lucas Villa simply labelled it as "mighty".

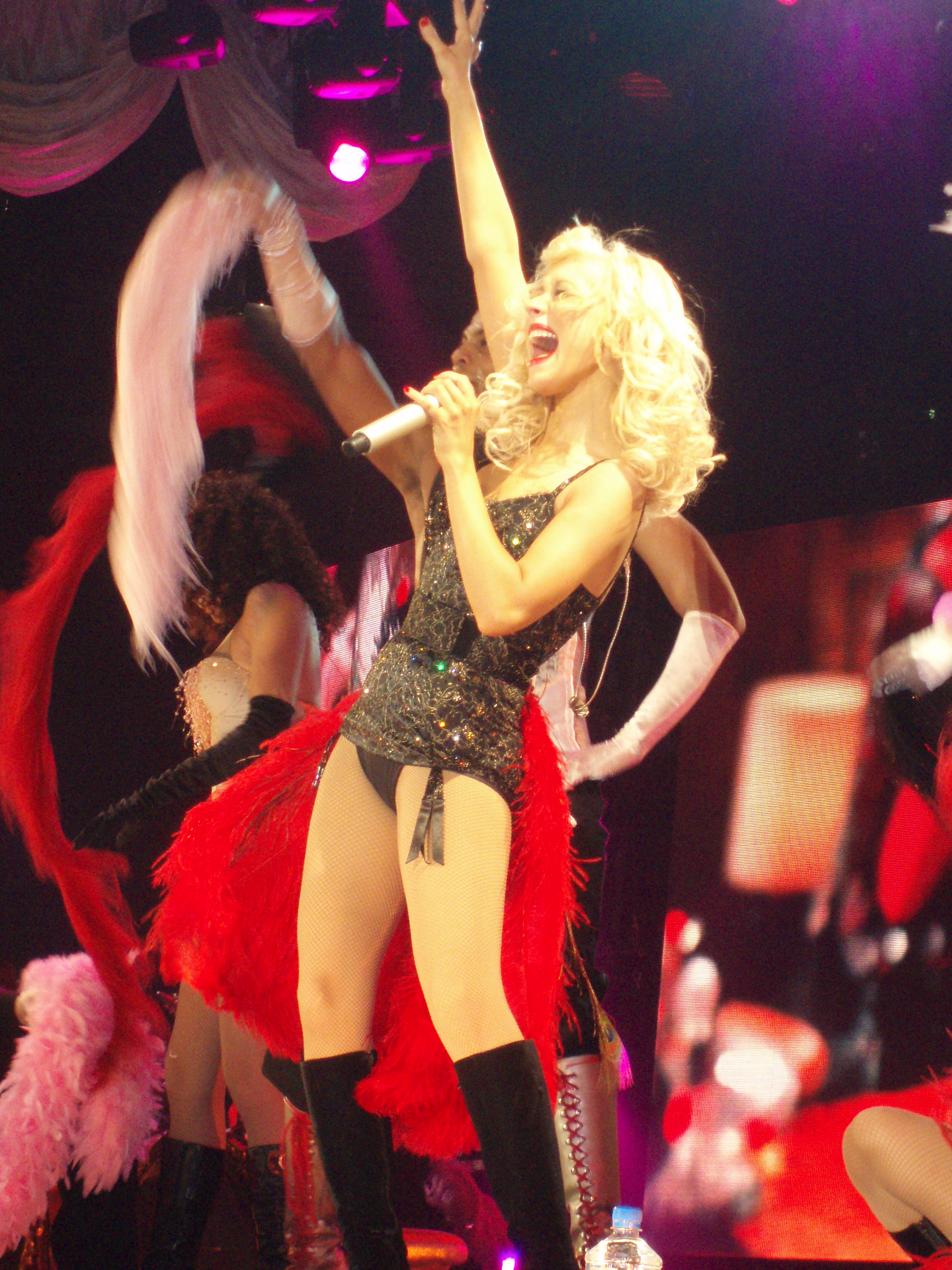
The song was being likened to Aguilera's 2001 single "Lady Marmalade" by multiple critics.

Writing for Atwood Magazine, Josh Weiner found the song "extraordinary", a "delight", and "one of the most energetic numbers Aguilera’s produced in recent memory". Pip Ellwood-Hughes from Entertainment Focus thought the song is "as infectious as it is powerful", and praised Aguilera for her work with Latin female artists, which he believed "works well for the purpose of this song". Cynthia Valdez of ¡Hola! opined that "Pa Mis Muchachas" "overflows with spirit, strength, soul and style", and noted that the performers "make each verse of the song explode with emotion". AllMusic's Neil Z. Yeung named the song a "showstopper" which "ends with a shiver-inducing vocal run that could bring the house down".

"Pa Mis Muchachas" was listed as one of the best Latin songs of 2021 by Amazon Music's experts. It was ranked at number thirty-nine on the top hundred list. Bianca Betancourt of Harper's Bazaar placed the song at number nineteen on the list of 2021's best songs, and called it "a bold and vivacious anthem celebrating the female friendships that make us stronger, in which Aguilera belts her signature runs over a traditional Cuban guaracha beat." She added that Aguilera "remains one of the strongest vocalists of her generation — regardless of language". The Tab's Harrison Brocklehurst named "Pa Mis Muchachas" "one of the greatest songs of 2021" and "one of the best songs of her [Aguilera's] career". Ticketmaster and American Songwriter both ranked the song among the best ever recorded by Aguilera.

== Commercial performance ==
"Pa Mis Muchachas" debuted and peaked at number 3 on the Billboard Latin Digital Song Sales on the chart issue dated November 6, 2021. It also debuted within Top 20 of another Billboard chart, namely Hot Trending Songs. It charted at number 18 on the Latin Pop Airplay, and number 37 on the Hot Latin Songs. The song received a platinum certification (Latin field) from the Recording Industry Association of America (RIAA) and reached the top tens of various Latin music markets. It was a top-ten airplay hit in Chile, Dominican Republic, El Salvador, Guatemala, Panama, Peru, Puerto Rico, and Suriname. Additionally, it reached number eight on the Mexico Espanol Airplay chart, compiled by Billboard, as well as number eleven on Mexico Airplay, a general chart intended for singles receiving airplay in Mexico. On the Billboard Argentina Hot 100 Singles the song reached number eighty-three.

Throughout Europe, "Pa Mis Muchachas" peaked at number twenty-four on the Hungarian Single Top 40 chart, as well as number seventy-six on the German Download Chart. In Spain, the track reached number seven on Billboard's Spain Digital Songs chart, and number sixty-eight of PROMUSICAE's official singles chart.

== Music video ==
The scene in which Aguilera drinks tequila and dances with another woman is inspired by a similar moment between Salma Hayek and Ashley Judd in the movie Frida.

=== Background ===
Aguilera first teased the video with a 15-second snippet of two women walking into a party against a backdrop of guitar string sounds, before fading out. The clip gained more than 528,000 views on Twitter. Aguilera noted that the video is a "first episode of a long story to come ... This is a celebration of individuality. This is a story about strength, about how to let your hair down. About rediscovering yourself along the way". The video was shot in Buenos Aires, Los Angeles and Madrid. It was produced by Brooke McDaniel and Ade Macalinao, and its dance sequence was choreographed by Teresa "Toogie" Barcelo.

=== Release ===
The music video was first teased on October 19, 2021, and then released alongside the song on October 22. On October 22, it also debuted on MTVLA (Latin America). It was directed by Alexandre Moors, and takes place in a luxurious mansion. The singer portrays a mafia boss of the underground association where women "look out for each other". Aguilera's character gets betrayed by a love interest (played by Francesco Cuizza) and it is decided he needs to be captured and eliminated.

The scene in which Aguilera drinks tequila straight from the bottle and sensually dances with another woman was inspired by the 2002 biographical film Frida, specifically a similar, homoerotic sequence featuring Salma Hayek and Ashley Judd. However, one may speculate that Aguilera's character picks up a gender-nonconforming person person to dance with. The music video also features Black women breastfeeding in public, Dobermanns, female models as bodyguards, and queer dancers. A three-minute behind-the scenes footage was released on Aguilera's YouTube channel in 2022.

On October 29, 2021, MTV Music UK included the video on its playlist of "the biggest music videos" of the week. In November 2021, the video was included in the MTV Latin America's list of top twenty music videos. In December, Radio Disney Latino named "Pa Mis Muchachas" the 2nd best music video of 2021.

== Accolades ==
Awards and nominations for "Pa Mis Muchachas"
Organization	Year	Category	Result	Ref.
Latin Grammy Awards	2022	Record of the Year	Nominated	
Latin Grammy Awards	2022	Song of the Year	Nominated	
Latin Grammy Awards	2022	Best Urban Fusion/Performance	Nominated	
Lo Mas Escuchado — Premios Virtuales	2022	Best Collaboration	Nominated	
Premios Juventud	2022	Best Female Collaboration	Nominated	
Punto Rojo Awards	2021	Hottest Song of the Year	Nominated	
Top 50 Music Awards	2022	Best Collaboration	Nominated	
Top Music Universe Awards	2022	Latin Collaboration of the Year	Nominated	

== Personnel ==
Credits adapted from Sony Music.

- Vocals – Christina Aguilera, Becky G, Nathy Peluso, Nicki Nicole
- Songwriters – Christina Aguilera, Kat Dahlia, Yasmil Marrufo, Jorge Luis Chacín, Yoel Henríquez, Natalia Peluso, Nicole Denise Cucco, Rebbeca Gomez
- Producers – Rafa Arcaute, Federico Vindver
- Co-producers – Afo Verde
- Vocal producer – Jean Rodríguez

== Charts ==
=== Weekly charts ===
Chart performance for "Pa Mis Muchachas"
Chart (2021–2022)	Peak position
Argentina Hot 100 (Billboard)	83
Bolivia (Monitor Latino)	17
Chile (Monitor Latino)	8
Dominican Republic (Monitor Latino)	7
Ecuador (Monitor Latino)	17
El Salvador (Monitor Latino)	6
Germany Download (Official German Charts)	76
Guatemala (Monitor Latino)	9
Guatemala Pop (Monitor Latino)	7
Hungary (Single Top 40)	24
Mexico (Monitor Latino)	16
Mexico Airplay (Billboard)	11
Mexico Espanol Airplay (Billboard)	8
Panama (Monitor Latino)	9
Panama Pop (Monitor Latino)	4
Panama (PRODUCE)	10
Peru (Monitor Latino)	8
Puerto Rico (Monitor Latino)	9
Spain (Promusicae)	68
Spain Digital Songs (Billboard)	7
Suriname (Nationale Top 40)	4
Taiwan (Hito Radio)	1
Venezuela (Monitor Latino)	16
US Hot Latin Songs (Billboard)	37
US Latin Digital Song Sales (Billboard)	3
US Latin Pop Airplay (Billboard)	18

=== Year-end charts ===
Chart (2022)	Position
Chile Pop (Monitor Latino)	68
Dominican Republic Pop (Monitor Latino)	43
Panama (Monitor Latino)	48
Puerto Rico Pop (Monitor Latino)	86
Venezuela Pop (Monitor Latino)	61

== Certifications ==
Certifications for "Pa Mis Muchachas"
Region	Certification	Certified units/sales
United States (RIAA)	Platinum (Latin)	60,000^{‡}
^{‡} Sales+streaming figures based on certification alone.

== Release history ==
Release history for "Pa Mis Muchachas"
Region	Date	Format	Label	Ref.
Various	October 22, 2021	Digital download; streaming	Sony Latin	
Italy	October 22, 2021	Contemporary hit radio	Sony Latin	
United States	October 27, 2021	Spanish contemporary	Sony Latin	
