= Somos Nada =

2021 single by Christina Aguilera

Single by Christina Aguilera

from the album Aguilera
- Language: Spanish
- English title: "We Are Nothing"
- Released: November 18, 2021
- Recorded: 2021
- Studio: Art House (Miami)
- Genre: Latin pop
- Length: 3:01
- Label: Sony Latin
- Songwriters: Christina Aguilera; Federico Vindver; Mario Domm; Sharlene Taulé
- Producers: Rafa Arcaute; Federico Vindver; Afo Verde (co.); Jean Rodríguez (voc.)

Christina Aguilera singles chronology
"Pa Mis Muchachas" (2021)	"Somos Nada" (2021)	"Santo" (2022)

Music video
- "Somos Nada" on YouTube

"Somos Nada" (transl. "We Are Nothing") is a song recorded by American singer Christina Aguilera for her ninth studio and second Spanish-language album, Aguilera (2022). It was written by Aguilera, Federico Vindver, Mario Domm, Sharlene Taulé, and was produced by Rafa Arcaute and Vindver, co-produced Afo Verde and Jean Rodríguez as a vocal producer. The song was released through Sony Music Latin as the album's second single on November 18, 2021. The song is featured on the album's first part, La Fuerza (transl. The Strength).

"Somos Nada" is a slow tempo, stripped-down ballad, featuring only Aguilera's vocals over a piano instrumental. Its lyrical content contrast the rest of La Fuerza, as it is one of the most vulnerable moments on the album. According to Aguilera, the song is about embracing "the contrast of vulnerability and strength. The journey within oneself." The song received positive reviews from critics, who named it one of Aguilera's signature songs. A music video was released on November 19, 2021.

== Background and composition ==
"Somos Nada" is a "stripped-down piano-led nostalgic ballad that puts her deep, powerful tone at the forefront". The track was called a "signature" Aguilera song where she "delivers a raw and emotional performance". The song is about the search for love in the face of emptiness and flying on "glass wings". "Somos Nada" taps into emptiness, the universal theme of vulnerability and inner strength, courage and independence, faith in one's own abilities, taking risks in the face of difficulties. In the song, Aguilera sings about overcoming obstacles and trying to not lose faith in love. According to The Recording Academy, the song explores "how someone can simultaneously be your everything and nothing".

The song is written in the key of A minor, with a moderately slow tempo of 50 beats per minute. Aguilera's vocals span from C_{3} to D_{5}.

== Release and music video ==
"Somos Nada" was released on November 18, 2021. Its music video was directed by Alexandre Moore, and was shot alongside the music video for "Pa Mis Muchachas" in Los Angeles, California. It continues the visual story line that began with "Pa Mis Muchachas" where Aguilera found out her lover and business partner is betraying her, and finishing him off. Genna Rivieccio of Culled Culture noted that Aguilera portrays a California-style gangster in the video, which itself has Rihanna's "Bitch Better Have My Money" "vibe". The story line was continued in the music video for "Santo". A three-minute behind-the scenes footage was released on Aguilera's YouTube channel in 2022.

== Critical reception ==
"Somos Nada" received mostly positive reviews from music critics. Neil Z. Yeung from AllMusic believed that the "piano-backed ballad sits alongside its most heart-rending siblings on Stripped" [Aguilera's fourth studio album]. Aldo Magallanes of a daily newspaper El Siglo de Torreón called Aguilera's vocal performance "powerful" and noted that it "brings the lyrics to life in a way that only she knows how". According to the critic, the singer's voice perfectly captures "Somos Nada's" "depth, vulnerability, and intensity". Rolling Stone en Español commented that "Aguilera dares to take risks with 'Somos Nada', her new song". Pip Ellwood-Hughes, a journalist for Entertainment Focus, said the song was "strong" and significantly different from La Fuerza's previous single, "Pa Mis Muchachas". Lucas Villa from Rolling Stone said: "Aguilera weathers the elements and heartbreak to find her inner strength to move on". Writing for NEIU Independent, Enrique Cerros opined that "Aguilera is at her best when she can showcase her mezzo-soprano vocals without heavy, distracting beats", and "'Somos Nada' does exactly that".

== Live performances and cover versions ==
Aguilera performed at the 22nd Annual Latin Grammy Awards on November 18, 2021. She performed "Somos Nada" with Julio Reyes Copello on the piano, before performing the album's previous single,"Pa' Mis Muchachas" alongside Becky G, Nathy Peluso and Nicki Nicole. She also performed "Somos Nada" during her set at World AIDS Day Concert LA Revival on December 1, 2021. On December 7, Aguilera was honored with the first-ever Music Icon award at the 47th People's Choice Awards and performed a medley of hits, as well as "Somos Nada".

In July 2022, Dania González made a cover of the song on the eleventh season of La Voz, a Mexican singing competition television series.

== Credits and personnel ==
Credits adapted from Spotify, and from the liner notes of La Fuerza:

- Lead vocals – Christina Aguilera
- Producers – Rafa Arcaute, Federico Vindver
- Composers – Aguilera, Federico Vindver, Mario Domm, Sharlene Taulé
- Co-producer – Afo Verde
- Vocal producer – Jean Rodríguez

== Charts ==
Chart (2021)	Peak position
Spain Digital Songs (Billboard)	10
US Latin Digital Songs (Billboard)	5
