= La Reina (song) =

2022 song by Christina Aguilera

Song by Christina Aguilera

from the album Aguilera
- Language: Spanish
- English title: "The Queen"
- Released: January 21, 2022
- Recorded: 2021
- Studio: Art House (Miami)
- Genre: Ranchera
- Length: 3:48
- Label: Sony Latin
- Songwriters: Christina Aguilera; Luigi Castillo; Santiago Castillo; Servando Primera; Yasmil Marrufo
- Producers: Rafa Arcaute; Federico Vindver; Yasmil Marrufo

Music video
- "La Reina" on YouTube

"La Reina" (transl. "The Queen") is a song recorded by American singer Christina Aguilera for her ninth studio and second Spanish-language album, Aguilera (2022). It was written by Aguilera, Luigi and Santiago Castillo, Servando Primera and Yasmil Marrufo, and its production was handled by the latter, alongside Rafa Arcaute, Federico Vindver, Afo Verde as co-producer, and Jean Rodríguez as a vocal producer. "La Reina" was conceived in 2017, when Aguilera invited Primera to work with her on the album. The song was then recorded in 2021 and serves as the closing track on the album's first of three parts, La Fuerza (transl. The Strength), which was released as a separate extended play (EP).

Musically, "La Reina" is a ranchera song, a genre that originates from Mexico. It was inspired by Vicente Fernández's 1973 rendition of José Alfredo Jiménez's "El Rey" (transl. "The King") (1971), serving as a "respectful response". The song is in theme with the rest of La Fuerza, which focuses on female empowerment, telling a man that he can be the king, but he will be nothing without his queen. The song received critical acclaim and was labelled as a standout track on the record. Time and Latina named it one of the best Latin songs of the year. A music video for "La Reina" was released on May 6, 2022, though it has not been confirmed as a single.

== Background and composition ==
In 2017, at Aguilera's request, A&R of RCA Records Katie Welle invited composer and singer Servando Primera of Servando & Florentino to help Aguilera with writing in Spanish. Primera wrote the song with Aguilera. "La Reina" was recorded along with the rest of the album at Art House studios in Miami in early 2021. The song was released on January 21, 2021, as the final track on the first EP from Aguilera, La Fuerza.

"La Reina" is a ranchera, written in the key of E major at 174 beats-per-minute. Lyrically, the song takes an empowering approach to a breakup song, where the protagonist swears to never let a man break her heart again, with Aguilera singing, "And I cried, and I cried, and I cried the day you left. And I swore, and I swore, and I swore that no man would ever make me sad again,". Serving as a "respectful response" to Vicente Fernández's rendition of El Rey (1973), Aguilera's response emphasizes "how a king wouldn’t be a king without his queen".

== Critical reception ==
"La Reina" received widespread acclaim from critics. In the official write-up for the Grammy Awards website, Bianca Gracie called it "impassioned". In a review of La Fuerza for Rolling Stone, Lucas Villa named "La Reina" the best song on the EP. He added that the song had "raw emotion that underscores ranchera" while praising Aguilera stating that "her vocal prowess is extraordinary in any language". NEIU Independent's Enrique Cerros called it the standout track on La Fuerza, applauding Aguilera's "powerhouse vocals" and emotion displayed on the song. He went on to compliment Aguilera's versatility, saying that she "can sing any type of music if she chooses to do so. Pip Ellwood-Hughes of Entertainment Focus called it one of the strongest moments on the record and "a showcase for what she can do when she exercises more vocal control and less inclination to scream".

Billboard placed "La Reina" at the number one spot on their ranking of La Fuerza, complimenting the ability of Aguilera's "powerful gifted vocals to deliver a heartfelt ranchera that perfectly transmits the popular phrase 'What's a king without his queen?'", and calling it the album's anthem. Genna Rivieccio of Culled Culture praised "La Reina", noting that "Aguilera owns her queen’s status through the tears". The reviewer also added that the song's chorus "translates to a sentiment Scarlett O'Hara could get on board with". Moises Mendez II from Time considered it as one of the best Latin songs of 2022, praising Aguilera for her "gorgeous, bombastic vocals". Latina shared the same sentiment and placed "La Reina" at number four on its list of 2022's best Latin songs. The magazine added: "In an empowering performance, Aguilera asserted her queenly authority while showing there’s no language barrier when it comes to her unparalleled vocal prowess".

== Commercial performance ==
"La Reina" debuted and peaked at number nine on the Billboard Latin Digital Song Sales chart, becoming Aguilera's seventh top 10 hit on the chart.

== Music video ==
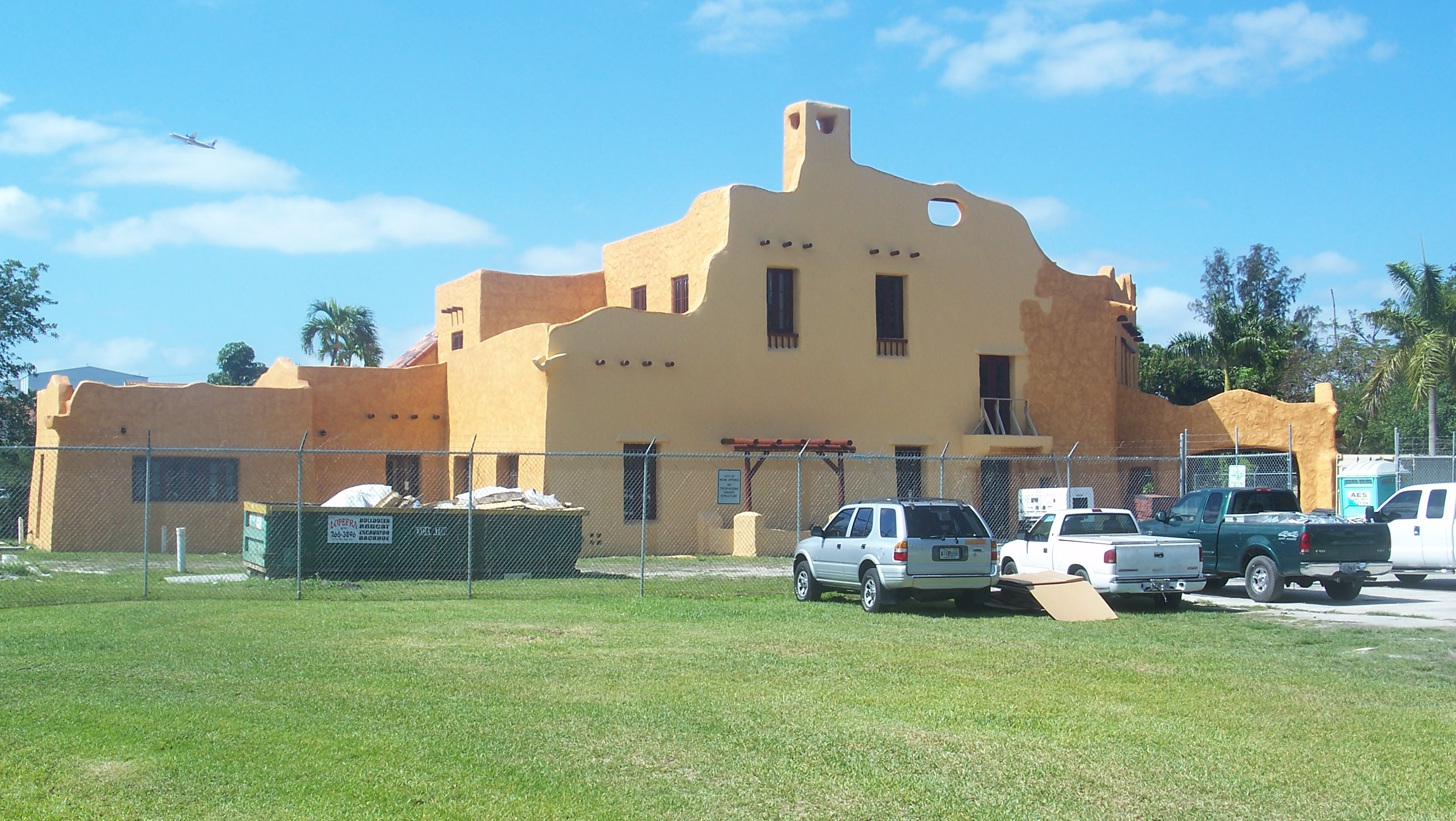
The courtyard of the Glenn Curtiss Mansion (pictured) was used for the music video.

Despite not being confirmed as an official single, "La Reina" received a music video. was released on May 6, 2022.

In March 2022, Aguilera was spotted filming a music video in Miami Springs, Florida. Directed by Nuno Gomes, the music video was filmed in the courtyard of the historic Glenn Curtiss Mansion, a Pueblo Revival style home constructed in 1925. In the video, a red-haired Aguilera wears a red dress, singing the song on the Glenn Curtiss Mansion's courtyard, which is decorated with papel picado. Aguilera is surrounded by the song's songwriters and producers, who are playing various instruments and singing the background vocals.

== Live performances ==
Aguilera performed "La Reina" for the first time at the 2022 Billboard Latin Music Awards on September 29, 2022.

== Impact ==
In 2023, singer Miriam Rodríguez covered the song in the Spanish edition of an interactive talent show Your Face Sounds Familiar. Her performance imitated the song's music video.

== Charts ==
Chart (2022)	Peak position
US Latin Digital Songs (Billboard)	9
