= No Es Que Te Extrañe =

Single by Christina Aguilera

from the album Aguilera
- Language: Spanish
- English title: "It's Not That I Miss You"
- A-side: "Intro (La Luz)" (Note: Dual single, released as La Luz)
- Released: September 30, 2022
- Recorded: 2021
- Studio: Art House (Miami)
- Genre: Pasillo
- Length: 4:43
- Label: Sony Latin
- Songwriters: Christina Aguilera; Edgar Barrera; Federico Vindver; Pablo Preciado; Rafa Arcaute; Yasmil Marrufo
- Producers: Federico Vindver; Rafa Arcaute; Afo Verde (co.); Jean Rodríguez (voc.)

Christina Aguilera singles chronology
"Suéltame" (2022)	"No Es Que Te Extrañe" (2022)	"Learning to Fly" (2023)

Music video
- "No Es Que Te Extrañe" on YouTube

"No Es Que Te Extrañe" (transl. "It's Not That I Miss You") is a song recorded by American singer Christina Aguilera for her ninth studio album, Aguilera. It was written by Aguilera, Edgar Barrera, Pablo Preciado, Yasmil Marrufo, Rafa Arcaute and Federico Vindver, and produced by the latter two. It was co-produced by Afo Verde, and vocal production was handled by Jean Rodríguez. The song was released by Sony Music Latin on September 30, 2022, as the album's fifth single. (Note: The single was officially released under the name La Luz (transl. The Light), featuring "Intro (La Luz)" and "No Es Que Te Extrañe")

Inspired by the domestic violence she and her mother experienced from her father in her early years, Aguilera sings about forgiving her father and setting herself free from her past. The song received positive reviews, with praise focusing on Aguilera's vocals and the song's lyrical topic. A music video depicting Aguilera's childhood was released alongside the song. At the 24th Annual Latin Grammy Awards the song has received nomination for Record of the Year.

== Background and composition ==
“As a mother, I want to be the strongest, healthiest version of myself for my children. I wrote ‘No Es Que Te Extrañe’ to come full circle, accept, forgive and be set free. Forgiveness begins when heartache turns into freedom.”

— Aguilera about the song.

"No Es Que Te Extrañe" was created during Aguilera's recording session for the album in early 2021. The song is a pasillo, a genre which originates from Colombia, and is considered the national style of music in Ecuador, where Aguilera's father is from. It is written in the key of D Major, with a moderately fast tempo of 184 beats-per-minute. The song is split into two acts: the first act is a tender ballad featuring only Aguilera's vocals and an acoustic guitar, while the second act juxtaposes the first, which features a heavy Latin beat and heightened energy.

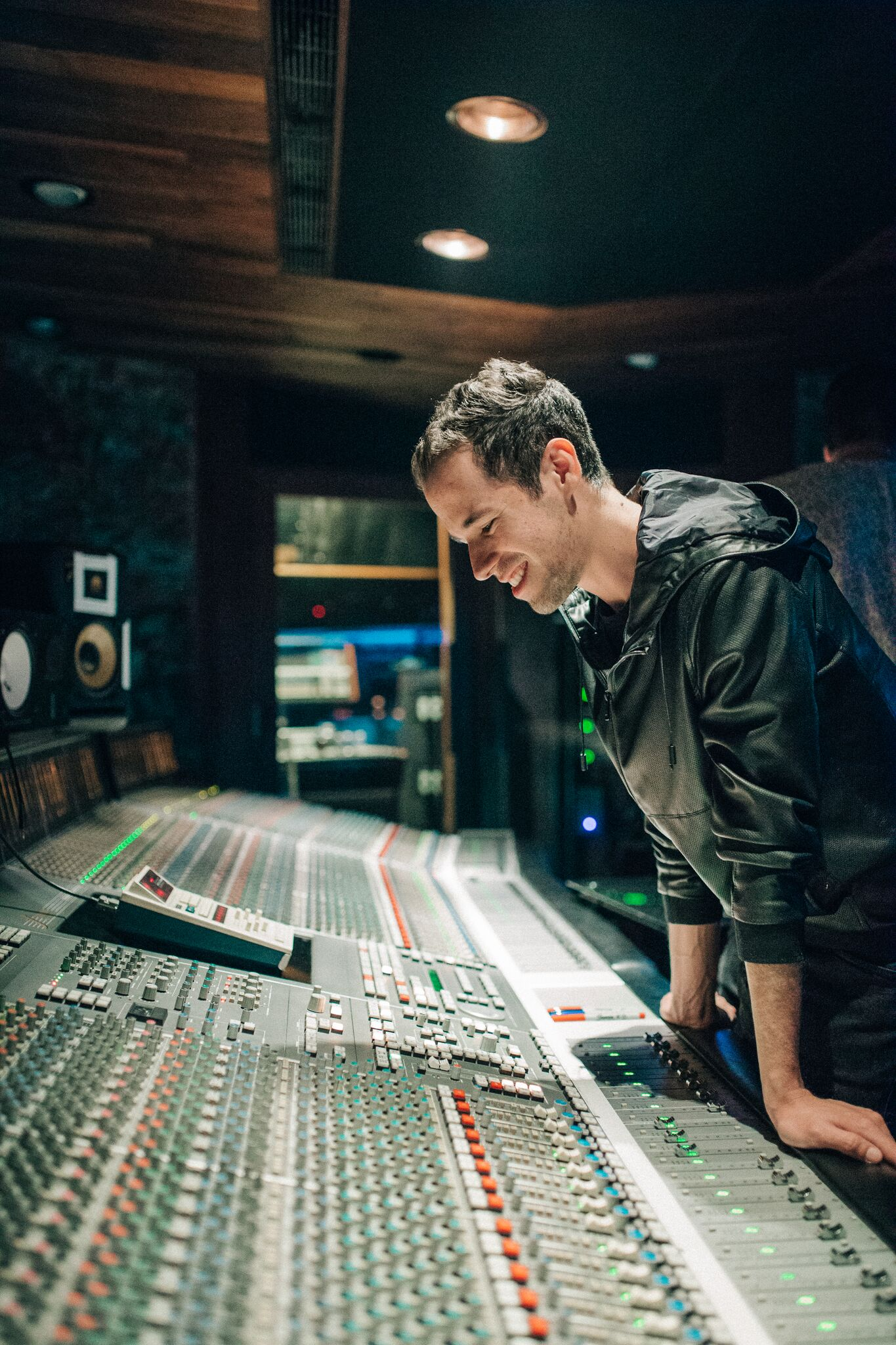
Edgar Barrera, who co-wrote the song.

Lyrically, Aguilera sings about getting closure for the domestic violence she and her mother dealt with in her early years from her estranged father, Fausto. She revealed that she wrote "No Es Que Te Extrañe" to "come full circle, accept, forgive and be set free." Aguilera disclosed that the song is about "feeling closure in a peaceful way", and understanding that someone who hurt you "might have a story as well". Aguilera also added that "No Es Que Te Extrañe" is a song about "embracing the power of forgiveness", and noted: "[it] allowed me to bring awareness on how unhealthy stagnant past grievances can keep you dwelling in dark thoughts and patterns. It’s only when you decide to move forward in forgiveness do you find your healing."

In her 2025 interview for the Carcy Magazine, the singer said: "[‘No Es Que Te Extrañe’] is a song about my father, and through it, I dive into the complexity of that relationship — the sense of loss, the pain from a chaotic and traumatic childhood, and ultimately, the journey toward forgiveness".

== Release and music video ==
Aguilera first teased "No Es Que Te Extrañe" on her social media, announcing the album's final part, La Luz. The song premiered on September 30, 2022, and was released commercially for digital download and on streaming platforms worldwide alongside its music video. The video was co-directed by Mike Ho and Aguilera and produced by Colin Randall. It portrays Aguilera's childhood, witnessing her father's abuse to her mother. The video parallels Aguilera's childhood with her father's, with Aguilera understanding that he may have gone through a similar situation. It opens in a “typical” American household in a rural scenery. Young Aguilera is comforted by her mother who is abused by a husband. Another scene in the video shows Aguilera as she puts on her father’s military jacket in front of a burning couch outside of her house. The video closes with the spoken word "Intro (La Luz)".

Genna Rivieccio of Culled Culture compared the video to the music video for "Confessions of a Broken Heart (Daughter to Father)" — a song by Lindsay Lohan which discussed domestic abuse and was also directed by the singer herself.

== Critical reception ==
"No Es Que Te Extrañe" received positive reviews from music critics, who praised Aguilera's vocals and the song's lyrics. In the official write-up for the Grammy Awards website, Bianca Gracie called "No Es Que Te Extrañe" a "somber" track that "found the artist healing her childhood trauma". Chuck Taylor – writing for Billboard — complimented the song for demonstrating that Aguilera has got the goods to rise above what so many lesser acts depend on for celebrity. AllMusic's Neil Z. Yeung considered the song "an unexpected moment of high drama that was written about finding closure and forgiveness", and praised it for its "cinematic" quality. Nick Butler from Sputnikmusic simply called it "great." The New York Times editor Kelefa Sanneh positively viewed the track's theme as "fearless". Jeff Benjamin, writer of Forbes, defines the song "one of the most stunning songs of her career so far", appreciating the "melancholy" arrangement, prizing the choice to draw from pasillo and the use of requinto guitar, in which Aguilera "speaks to distant memories and finds peace with someone with whom she has a complex history". Music critic Odi O'Malley believed "No Es Que Te Extrañe" "starts like a [typical] ballad and then becomes more passionate, more evidently Latin". The track was listed as one of the best Latin songs of 2022 by Spotify's experts.

=== Accolades ===
Year	Ceremony	Category	Result	Ref.
2023	Premios Juventud	Video with the Most Powerful Message	Nominated	
2023	Latin Grammy Awards	Record of the Year	Nominated	

== Track listing ==
La Luz digital single

1. "Intro (La Luz)" – 0:40
2. "No Es Que Te Extrañe" – 4:43

== Credits and personnel ==
- Writing – Christina Aguilera, Edgar Barrera, Federico Vindver, Jean Rodriguez, Pablo Preciado, Rafa Arcaute, Yasmil Marrufo
- Producing – Rafa Arcaute, Federico Vindver
- Mixing – Mike Seaberg
- Recording – Felipe Trujillo, Ray Charles Brown, Jr.
- Mastering – Jaycen Joshua
- Vocals – Christina Aguilera
- Strings arranging and conducting – Davide Rosi, Roland Gajate

== Charts ==
Chart (2022)	Peak position
Taiwan (Hito Radio)	2
US Latin Digital Songs (Billboard)	9

== Release history ==
Release history for "No Es Que Te Extrañe"
Region	Date	Format	A-side	Label(s)	Ref.
Various	September 30, 2022	Digital download; streaming	"Intro (La Luz)"	Sony Latin	
