= Santo (song) =

2022 single by Christina Aguilera and Ozuna

Single by Christina Aguilera and Ozuna

from the album Aguilera
- Language: Spanish
- English title: "Saint"
- Released: January 20, 2022
- Recorded: 2021
- Studio: 5020 Studio (Miami, FL); Nightbird Recording Studios (Los Angeles, CA); Hit Factory (New York, NY); Aura Studios
- Genre: Reggaeton; urbano; cumbia
- Length: 3:03
- Label: Sony Latin
- Songwriters: Christina Aguilera; Dallas James Koehlke; Gale; Josh Barrios; Ozuna
- Producers: DallasK; Rafa Arcaute; Federico Vindver; Afo Verde (co.); Jean Rodríguez (voc.)

Christina Aguilera singles chronology
"Somos Nada" (2021)	"Santo" (2022)	"Suéltame" (2022)

Ozuna singles chronology
"Señor Juez" (2021)	"Santo" (2022)	"G Wagon" (2022)

Music video
- "Santo" on YouTube

"Santo" (transl. "Saint") is a song recorded by American singer Christina Aguilera and Puerto Rican rapper and singer Ozuna for her ninth studio and second Spanish-language album, Aguilera (2022). It was written by Aguilera and Ozuna, alongside DallasK, Gale, and Josh Barrios, while the production was handled by DallasK, Rafa Arcaute, Federico Vindver, co-produced by Afo Verde, and its vocal production was handled by Jean Rodríguez. It was released by Sony Music Latin as the album's third single on January 20, 2022. It is the third consecutive and final single to be featured on the album's first part, La Fuerza (transl. The Strength).

"Santo" is a reggaeton song with urbano and cumbia influences. Lyrically, the song is about two people who are willing to do anything for each other. It received positive reviews from music critics, who praised Aguilera's vocals and the song's rhythm and catchiness. "Santo" achieved commercial success mainly in Latin American territories, reaching top 10 in Guatemala, El Salvador, Panama, Puerto Rico, and Peru. It also received a platinum certification (Latin field) from the Recording Industry Association of America (RIAA), and was nominated for Best Urban Fusion/Performance at the 23rd Annual Latin Grammy Awards.

== Background and composition ==
"Santo" was created for Aguilera's follow-up album to Mi Reflejo (2000) during recording sessions in 2021. Aguilera sought out to pay tribute to the music of Latin America with the album's sound, paying tribute to several genres from the region. "Santo" is a reggaeton song, a genre of music originating from Panama and Puerto Rico which falls under the urbano music category. The song contains influences of Colombian cumbia, and through its use of drums and percussion instruments such as the maraca, the song features the sound of rumba. It is written in the key of A minor, with a moderately fast tempo of 96 beats per minute.

Lyrically, "Santo" tells the story of two people who are "dying for each other" and are ready to commit every sin possible. In the chorus, Aguilera calls her lover a "Saint" inviting her lover to "come and save" her, While Ozuna calls her "more dangerous than the impact of an assault rifle".

== Critical reception ==
Upon its release, the single received positive reviews from music critics. Billboard considered "Santo" an "infectious perreo", and praised the song for its "catchy hook", Ozuna's "crisp, sugary vocals" and Aguilera's vocal range. Liz Calvario‍ of Entertainment Tonight called "Santo" "the hottest song of the year", and Lucas Villa from Rolling Stone labelled it as a "sexy" reggaeton song. Writing for Remezcla, Isabella Vega thought that "Aguilera has embodied the pop-based vein of reggaeton with the absolute banger, 'Santo'". In his review for Atwood Magazine, Josh Weiner found the song "fiesta-ready" and cheered its "pure Latin production". He also described Ozuna's singing as "spicy". BroadwayWorld's Michael Major praised Aguilera's "unmatched vocals in full force" and thought that the song's "Latin rhythms create the perfect flow that makes an instant hit."

According to El Tres, the song is "driven by a contagious reggaetón rhythm". Lideny Villatoro of Univision opined that "Santo" is a perreo-influenced "jam" and "it's a sin not to want to dance to its rhythm". She also called the song a "potential hit". Pip Ellwood-Hughes from Entertainment Focus considered "Santo" "undeniably catchy" and the "EP's strongest moment". He believed that the single's "pumping beat will see it spreading throughout the clubs in Latin America, and across the globe". A reviewer from Monitor Latino shared the same sentiment, calling the song "very rhythmic", and noting that it will make "everyone dance to it". Shirley Gómez of ¡Hola! labelled "Santo" as a "powerful interpretation that honors Latin and Afro-Caribbean rhythms". Writing for NEIU Independent, Enrique Cerros named the song "spicy" and thought that it "screams club banger". Aldo Magallanes of a daily newspaper El Siglo de Torreón called the song "a perfect fusion" and "a powerful performance that, accompanied by Latin rhythms, becomes an instant hit".

American Songwriter's Jacob Uitti positioned "Santo" at number five on his list of the top 10 Christina Aguilera songs. In July 2022, Billboard called the song one of "the best Latin collaborations of the year (so far)".

== Commercial performance ==
In the United States, "Santo" reached number 24 on Billboard's Hot Latin Songs. The song fared better on the airplay charts, reaching number 12 on the Latin Airplay chart, and number three and seven on the Latin Pop Airplay and Latin Rhythm Airplay charts respectively. It received a platinum certification by the Recording Industry Association of America (RIAA) in the Latin field.

The song achieved commercial success mainly in Latin and Spanish-speaking territories, peaking at number 6 on Monitor Latino's Latin America chart. In Guatemala, "Santo" peaked at number three on the overall chart and number one on the pop chart. The song peaked at number six in Puerto Rico, while reaching number one on the pop chart, number seven on the urbano chart. "Santo" reached the top 10 in other territories, such as Panama, El Salvador, and Peru. It was a top 20 year-end hit in Guatemala, and top 30 in Dominican Republic. Throughout Europe, "Santo" peaked at number seventeen on the Hungarian Single Top 40 chart, and at number seventy-two on the Spanish Singles Chart.

== Music video ==
Aguilera surrounded by the forest army and magical creatures.

The music video was released alongside the song on January 20, 2022. It was directed by Venezuelan director Nuno Gomes and shot in Las Vegas, Nevada.

It is the third installment of the album's visual story-line, a follow-up to the "Somos Nada" video, where Aguilera's lover and business partner was killed after betraying her. Now she finds herself in a magical forest of an underworld where she faces the ghost of her ex-partner seemingly haunting her. Aguilera asks her savior to "come save" her. As they dance, they exchange alluring glances and explore their mystical surroundings. The performers dance together in the sorcerous land with magical creatures, where they look tempted by their surroundings and each other. Later Aguilera — dressed in an all-red ensemble donning a flower lip ring — is seen with fairies and forest army all around her.

Rolling Stone's Tomás Mier opined that Aguilera and Ozuna "channel Adam and Eve's wild side" in the music video, and thought that its scenery resembles "dark Garden of Eden". Albert Nowicki of Prime News observed that the video looks "like a cross between Missy Elliott's 'Get Ur Freak On' and Backstreet Boys' 'Everybody'". An alternate music video for "Santo" — featuring Aguilera and Ozuna in a purple-tinted forest — was released on June 15, 2022.

== Live performances ==
Aguilera performed "Santo" live for the first time at the 2022 Mallorca Live Festival, along with other songs from her ninth studio album and second Spanish-language, Aguilera. It was later included on the setlist of her promotional tour EU/UK Summer Series.

== Accolades ==
Nominations received by "Santo"
Year	Awards	Category	Result	Ref.
2022	Latin American Music Awards	Favorite Video	Nominated	
2022	Premios Juventud	OMG Collaboration	Nominated	
2022	Latin Grammy Awards	Best Urban Fusion/Performance	Nominated	
2023	Lo Nuestro Awards	The Perfect Mix of the Year	Nominated	

== Charts ==
=== Weekly charts ===
Chart (2022)	Peak position
Argentina Latino (Monitor Latino)	19
Chile Pop (Monitor Latino)	10
Costa Rica Latino (Monitor Latino)	18
Croatia International Airplay (Top lista)	79
Dominican Republic Pop (Monitor Latino)	7
Ecuador Pop (Monitor Latino)	16
El Salvador (Monitor Latino)	6
El Salvador Pop (Monitor Latino)	5
France Airplay (SNEP)	131
Germany Download (Official German Charts)	80
Guatemala (Monitor Latino)	3
Guatemala Pop (Monitor Latino)	1
Hungary (Rádiós Top 40)	38
Hungary (Single Top 40)	17
Latin America (Monitor Latino)	6
Latin America (Latino) (Monitor Latino)	6
Mexico Airplay (Billboard)	22
Mexico Espanol Airplay (Billboard)	8
Mexico Pop (Monitor Latino)	13
Nicaragua Pop (Monitor Latino)	14
Panama (Monitor Latino)	6
Panama (PRODUCE)	7
Panama Pop (Monitor Latino)	4
Panama Urbano (Monitor Latino)	6
Peru (Monitor Latino)	9
Peru Pop (Monitor Latino)	4
Peru Urbano (Monitor Latino)	5
Puerto Rico (Monitor Latino)	6
Puerto Rico Pop (Monitor Latino)	1
Puerto Rico Urbano (Monitor Latino)	7
Spain (PROMUSICAE)	72
Suriname (Nationale Top 40)	21
Venezuela Pop (Monitor Latino)	9
Venezuela Urbano (Monitor Latino)	12
US Hot Latin Songs (Billboard)	24
US Latin Airplay (Billboard)	12
US Latin Pop Airplay (Billboard)	3
US Latin Rhythm Airplay (Billboard)	7

=== Year-end charts ===
Chart (2022)	Position
Argentina (Monitor Latino)	67
Bolivia (Monitor Latino)	58
Chile Pop (Monitor Latino)	38
Dominican Republic (Monitor Latino)	24
El Salvador Pop (Monitor Latino)	83
Guatemala (Monitor Latino)	20
Panama (Monitor Latino)	34
Paraguay Pop (Monitor Latino)	77
Puerto Rico (Monitor Latino)	78
Puerto Rico Pop (Monitor Latino)	20
US Latin Pop Airplay (Billboard)	24
US Latin Rhythm Airplay (Billboard)	45

== Certifications ==
Region	Certification	Certified units/sales
United States (RIAA)	Platinum (Latin)	60,000^{‡}
^{‡} Sales+streaming figures based on certification alone.

== Release history ==
Release history for "Santo"
Region	Date	Format	Label	Ref.
Various	January 20, 2022	Digital download; streaming	Sony Music Latin	
United States	January 23, 2022	Spanish contemporary	Sony Music Latin	
Italy	January 27, 2022	Contemporary hit radio	Sony Music Entertainment	
Russia	February 1, 2022	Contemporary hit radio	Sony Music Entertainment	
