= La Fuerza =

2022 extended play by Christina Aguilera

EP by Christina Aguilera
- Released: January 21, 2022
- Recorded: 2021
- Studio: Art House; Criteria; (Miami)
- Genre: Latin
- Length: 19:17
- Language: Spanish
- Label: Sony Latin
- Producer: Rafa Arcaute; DallasK; JonTheProducer; Yasmil Marrufo; Federico Vindver

Christina Aguilera chronology
Liberation (2018)	La Fuerza (2022)	La Tormenta (2022)

Singles from La Fuerza
- 1. "Pa Mis Muchachas" Released: October 22, 2021; 2. "Somos Nada" Released: November 18, 2021; 3. "Santo" Released: January 20, 2022

La Fuerza (transl. The Strength) is the first solo and Spanish-language extended play by American singer Christina Aguilera. It was released through Sony Music Latin on January 21, 2022 as the first part of her ninth studio and second Spanish-language album Aguilera (2022). It is her second EP, following her promotional EP, Justin & Christina (2003), with Justin Timberlake. While recording her ninth studio album in Miami in early 2021, Aguilera decided to release the album in an unconventional way, by releasing it in three separate parts. La Fuerza was the first part of the trilogy. The EP is centered around female empowerment and strength and features guest vocals from Becky G, Nicki Nicole, Nathy Peluso, and Ozuna.

Three singles were released from the album: "Pa Mis Muchachas" with Becky G, Nicole and Peluso, "Somos Nada", and "Santo" with Ozuna. Upon release, the EP received positive reviews and debuted at number two on the US Latin Pop Albums. La Fuerza was rereleased as the first disc on Aguilera along with its followup, La Tormenta on May 31, 2022.

== Background and recording ==
"At home I used to listen to music in Spanish. Now, as a mom, having the career I've had, with over twenty years in the industry, I am happy not to have recorded this earlier, because now I've got a better perspective [as an artist]."

—Aguilera, about La Fuerza (2022)

In 2000, Aguilera released her second studio album Mi Reflejo, her first Spanish-language album, which went on to be ranked number ten on the Billboard's Top 20 Latin Albums of All Time and become the best selling Latin pop album of 2000.

Aguilera began teasing the release of her second "overdue" Spanish-language album two decades later in late 2020, noting in a Health magazine interview in April 2021 that, "I'm months away from anything being announced [...] I am reinspired and have reconnected with myself. I've fallen in love with music all over again, which is a really big thing to say, having spent my entire career in music".

Aguilera noted that she took advantage of the COVID-19 pandemic to retreat to Miami, Florida in a COVID-safe writing camp with the intention to pay homage to her Ecuadorian heritage. The album was recorded over four weeks, with the first song recorded being the album's lead single, "Pa' Mis Muchachas". Aguilera further teased the release of the album in an interview with Insider in September 2021. Aguilera revealed that she planned to release the album "throughout the next year in sort of six song increments every few months". In an interview with the Los Angeles Times, Aguilera revealed that the album would be released in three pieces, confirming that the first part of the album would be titled La Fuerza and that it would celebrate her power as a woman. The full Spanish album, Aguilera was released on May 31, 2022 and features all of the songs from the EP La Fuerza as well as its follow-up La Tormenta.

== Music and lyrics ==
La Fuerza is a Latin EP, influenced by dance-pop, piano ballads, ranchera, urbano music, cumbia, guaracha and reggaeton.

== Singles ==
Three singles were released for the EP. These include "Pa Mis Muchachas", "Somos Nada", and "Santo".

== Critical reception ==
Professional ratings
Review scores
Source	Rating
Atwood Magazine	8.5/10
Rolling Stone	3.5/5 stars

Upon release, the EP received positive reviews from music critics. La Fuerza was named the best album of the week by Billboard Argentina. Reviewing the EP for Rolling Stone, Lucas Villa wrote that Aguilera's "vocal prowess is extraordinary in any language", and labelled its ballads as "highlights", considering "La Reina" the best song on the record. Billboard described La Fuerza as "not only an homage to her [Aguilera's] Latin roots but a project full of passion, innovation, exploration and, of course, powerhouse vocals."

Josh Weiner, writing for Atwood Magazine, praised the EP for its quality and opined that La Fuerza "is nineteen minutes of excellent, fully-realized music", and cheered Aguilera for "embracing an exciting new artistic identity". Weiner concluded his review by claiming that "seeing the veteran performer shake things up so drastically in this late phase of her career is massively impressive". The music magazine later named La Fuerza one of the best EPs of 2022, stating that "her [Aguilera’s] powerful pipes continue to dazzle; even when she’s singing in her second language, it all sounded smooth, natural, and never forced". Pip Ellwood-Hughes of Entertainment Focus claimed that "hearing her [Aguilera] singing in Spanish again is a joy and this collection of songs is better than anything she’s released in years". Enrique Cerros from NEIU Independent gave La Fuerza a 5/5 score, and noted that it is "a successful comeback for Aguilera, and it can be considered her best work to date". The Tab's Harrison Brocklehurst applauded the EP for its "excellent Latin bangers" and for the reggaeton beats that help Aguilera's voice "truly soar".

Two songs from the EP, "Pa Mis Muchachas" and "Santo", were nominated for the Latin Grammy Awards. A ranchera titled "La Reina" was named one of the best Latin songs of 2022 by the Time magazine. Esquire placed La Fuerza on its list of the thirty-seven best albums of 2022.

== Commercial performance ==
La Fuerza debuted at number two on the US Latin Pop Albums chart and at 14 on Top Latin Albums chart with 4,000 album-equivalent units sold of which 2,000 were pure album copies. It charted in multiple countries, including the United Kingdom (where it reached number thirty-one on UK Album Downloads Chart), Germany (where it reached number forty-six on Digital Albums Chart), and Spain (where it reached number fifty-four on PROMUSICAE's official albums chart). The EP was also commercially successful in Portugal, as reported by Vogue in March 2022, as well as in Panama and Guatemala.

== Track listing ==
La Fuerza track listing
No.	Title	Writer(s)	Producer(s)	Length
1.	"Ya Llegué"	Christina Aguilera; Jon Leone; Juan Morelli; Kat Dahlia	JonTheProducer; Rafa Arcaute; Federico Vindver	3:03
2.	"Pa Mis Muchachas" (with Becky G and Nicki Nicole featuring Nathy Peluso)	Aguilera; Jorge Luis Chacín; Natalia Peluso; Dahlia; Nicole Denise Cucco; Rebbeca Gomez; Yasmil Marrufo; Yoel Henríquez	Arcaute; Vindver	3:36
3.	"Somos Nada"	Aguilera; Vindver; Mario Domm; Sharlene Taulé	Arcaute; Vindver	3:01
4.	"Santo" (with Ozuna)	Aguilera; Dallas James Koehlke; Gale; Josh Barrios; Ozuna	DallasK; Arcaute; Vindver	3:03
5.	"Como Yo"	Aguilera; Vindver; Gino the Ghost; Juan Morelli; Dhalia; Arcaute; Tobias Wincorn	Arcaute; Vindver	2:46
6.	"La Reina"	Aguilera; Luigi Castillo; Santiago Castillo; Servando Primera; Marrufo	Arcaute; Vindver; Marrufo	3:48
Total length:				19:17

=== Notes ===
- All songs were co-produced by Afo Verde.
- All songs were vocally produced by Jean Rodríguez.

== Personnel ==
=== Musicians ===
- Christina Aguilera – vocals
- Federico Vindver – arrangement, keyboards, programming (all tracks), percussion (2)
- JonTheProducer – arrangement, keyboards, programming (1)
- Rafa Arcaute – arrangement, keyboards, programming (all tracks); percussion (2)
- Jorge Luis Chacín – background vocals (2)
- Kat Dahlia – background vocals (2)
- Yasmil Marrufo – background vocals (2, 6); bass, guitar (6)
- Yoel Henríquez – background vocals (2)
- Matt Rollings – piano (3)
- DallasK – arrangement, keyboards, programming (4)
- Luigi Castillo – background vocals (6)
- Santiago Castillo – background vocals (6)
- Servando Primera – background vocals (6)

=== Technical ===
- Jaycen Joshua – mastering, mixing
- Federico Vindver – recording
- Jean Rodríguez – recording
- Rafa Arcaute – recording
- Ray Charles Brown, Jr. – recording
- José Aponte – recording (4)
- Yasmil Marrufo – recording (6)
- Felipe Trujillo – engineering assistance (1, 5)
- Morgan David – engineering assistance (1, 5)

== Charts ==
Chart performance for La Fuerza
Chart (2022)	Peak position
German Digital Albums (Official German Charts)	46
Spanish Albums (PROMUSICAE)	54
Swiss Albums (Schweizer Hitparade)	79
UK Album Downloads (OCC)	31
US Top Current Album Sales (Billboard)	41
US Top Latin Albums (Billboard)	14
US Latin Pop Albums (Billboard)	2

== Release history ==
Release history for La Fuerza
Region	Date	Format	Label	Ref.
Various	January 21, 2022	Digital download; streaming	Sony Latin	
