= El Ídolo de Mexico =

Studio album by Vicente Fernández
- Released: 1974
- Recorded: 1972/73
- Genre: Mariachi
- Language: Spanish
- Label: CBS

El Ídolo de Mexico (The Idol of Mexico) is an album by Mexican singer Vicente Fernández, released in 1974 by CBS. In 2015, it was selected by Billboard magazine as one of the "50 Essential Latin Albums of the Last 50 Years".

== Track listing ==
Side A

1. "Si Acaso Vuelves"
2. "Las Llaves de Mi Alma"
3. "El Precio"
4. "No Vas a Creer"
5. "El Rey"
6. "Yo Quiero Ser Tu Amante"
7. "El Arracadas"

Side B

1. "Que te Vaya Bonito"
2. "Volvió Por Ella"
3. "Amor Indio"
4. "Tu Amor Soñado"
