= Kat Dahlia =

American singer and rapper

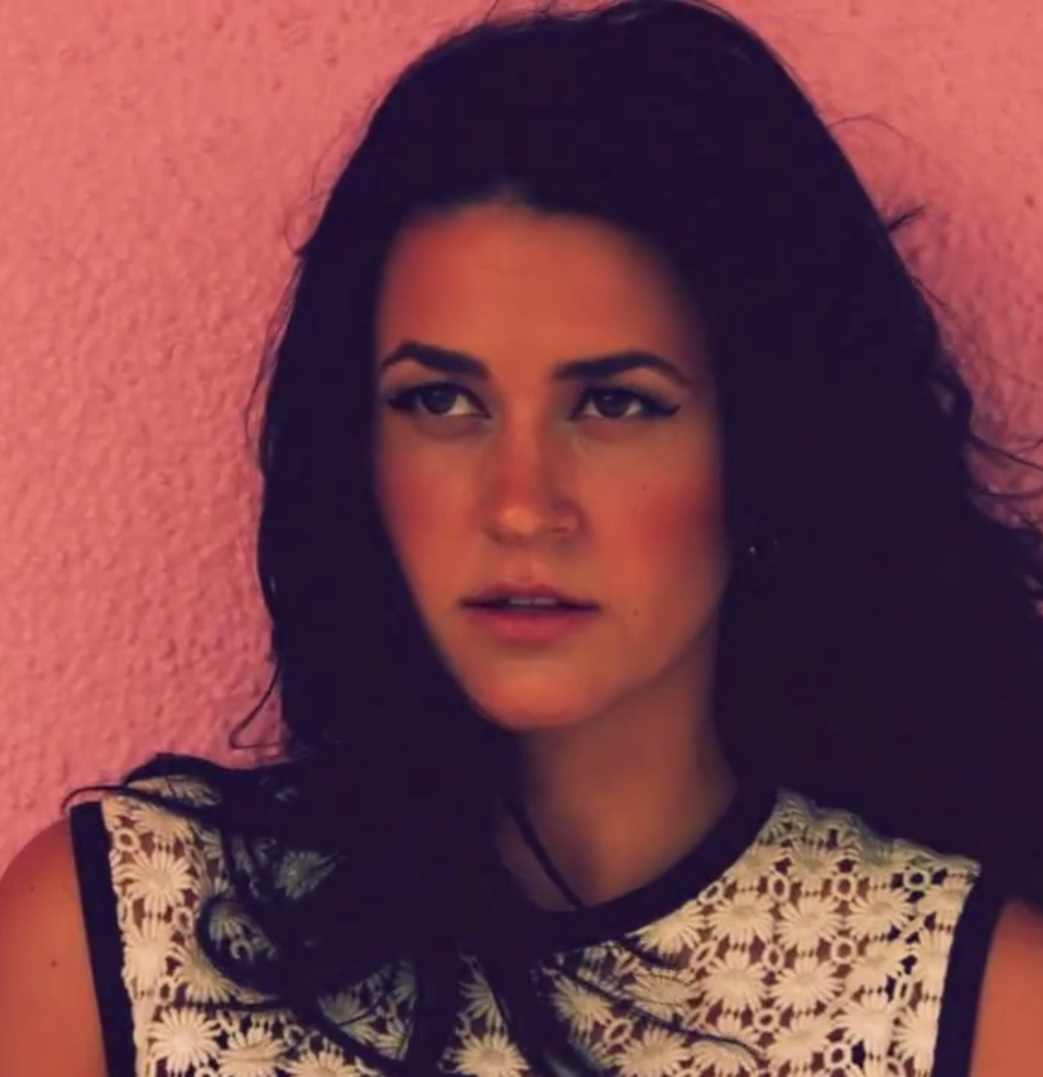
- Kat Dahlia poses for Complex in 2014

Background information
- Also known as: Kat Hue
- Born: Katriana Sandra Huguet; July 29, 1990 (age 36); Miami, Florida, U.S.
- Genres: Alternative R&B; Latin pop; hip hop
- Occupations: Rapper; singer; songwriter; fashion icon
- Years active: 2011–present
- Labels: Vested in Culture; Epic; INgrooves
- Website: katdahlia.com

Katriana Sandra Huguet (born July 29, 1990), better known by her stage name Kat Dahlia (formerly Kat Hue), is an American recording artist. Born and raised in Miami, Florida, Dahlia is a singer, songwriter, fashion icon and rapper, known for her "razor sharp" lyrics and her "unique, aggressive flow". She released her debut single "Gangsta", in March 2013, to rave reviews. Dahlia released her debut studio album My Garden, in January 2015, with Vested in Culture and Epic Records, the latter of which she secured a recording contract with in 2012. In 2013, Dahlia ranked number eight on Billboard's "Next Big Sound".

== Early life ==
Kat Dahlia was born Katriana Sandra Huguet on July 29, 1990, to a Cuban mother and her Lebanese-Cuban father, in Miami Beach, Florida. She began rapping at the age of eight and writing songs at the age of 15, ripping instrumentals from YouTube, in lieu of a band. At the age of 18, after saving money from jobs as a waitress, Dahlia decided to leave Miami, and moved to New York City a month later, "on a whim." Thereafter, Dahlia became involved in what she describes as a "toxic relationship", which she would later come to regard as a source of inspiration and "writer's gold." She chose the name Kat Dahlia as her stage name after her producer suggested it and kept it, because its soft and beautiful, but still has a dark undertone to it.

== Career ==
After self-financing an extended play (EP) and a music video, Dahlia was discovered by Vested in Culture VP of A&R Amanda Berkowitz. Berkowitz quickly brought Dahlia to the attention of veteran record executive Sylvia Rhone. In 2012, describing Dahlia as "more than just a pop artist", Rhone signed her to her newly launched label, Vested in Culture (VIC), a joint venture with Epic Records. Dahlia's debut album was originally set to come out in 2014, becoming VIC's inaugural release.

Dahlia's first single and video for VIC, was the track "Gangsta", which MTV called "filled to the brim with fierce rapping". The video, filmed in Miami, reflects the difficulties of her earlier life. The video was directed by Samantha Lecca and premiered via Vevo, on March 5, 2013. Also in March, Dahlia was selected as a BET "Music Matters" artist. "Gangsta" was featured in the background of the September 24, 2014, Season 16 Premiere of Law & Order: Special Victims Unit, Girls Disappeared.

Dahlia digitally released three songs, "Gangsta", "Money Party", and "Mirror" on March 5, 2013. On December 17, 2013, she released her song "Crazy" for free on her website. Her debut My Garden was released on January 15, 2015. The album debuted at number 54 on the US Billboard 200 chart. My Garden received generally positive reviews from music critics. At Metacritic, which assigns a normalized rating out of 100 to reviews from critics, the album received an average score of 63, which indicates "generally favorable reviews", based on four reviews.

Kat Dahlia released her third EP, titled 20s, 50s, 100s, via SoundCloud on May 9, 2016, which features three songs, "Run It Up", "Voices in My Head" and "Lion".

In May 2017, Dahlia released the song "Friday Night Majic", which was intended as the lead single from her planned second studio album, Naked Lady and a White Horse. The album was produced by J Roc and originally scheduled to be released in July 2017, but did not eventuate. On July 21, 2017, Dahlia released the single "Body and Soul" to all streaming platforms and also uploaded a lyric video to her YouTube Vevo channel.

On May 4, 2018, after creating his For the Culture Playlist, which included Miguel's single "Come Through and Chill", Salaam Remi released the EP South Beach Social Club, a collaboration with Dahlia.

In 2022, Dahlia helped co-write with Joel DELEŌN, Gale, and DallasK on the former's song "COCO".

== Artistry ==
Dahlia's musical style has been described as being "razor sharp" lyrics and her unique, aggressive flow. Dhalia sings and raps in both English and Spanish. Dahlia cites artists Christina Aguilera,Michael Jackson B. B. King, Miles Davis, Led Zeppelin, The Doors, Bob Marley, Frank Sinatra, and Celia Cruz as musical influences. Also, in interviews, Dahlia has mentioned that reggae recording artist Bob Marley, has had a great influence on her musical style. She has said: "I listened to a lot of Bob Marley, especially down here. I used to go to Purdy Lounge on Monday night, they always had reggae bands. Reggae is just everywhere down here, dancehall is everywhere in the clubs. It's not only playing hip hop."

== Discography ==
=== Studio albums ===
List of albums, with selected chart positions
Title	Details	Peak chart positions
Title	Details	US
My Garden	Release date: January 13, 2015; Label: Vested in Culture, Epic Records; Format: CD, Digital download	54
Seven	Release date: October 30, 2020; Label: Self-released; Format: CD, Digital download	—

=== EPs ===
List of extended plays, with selected details
Title	Details
Shades of Gray (as Kat Hue)	Released: February 29, 2012; Label: No Days Off Entertainment; Format: Digital download
20s, 50s, 100s	Released: May 9, 2016; Label: Self-released; Format: Free download
South Beach Social Club (with Salaam Remi)	Released: May 4, 2018; Label: Louder Than Life; Format: Download, streaming

=== Mixtapes ===
List of mixtapes, with selected details
Title	Details
Seeds	Released: November 21, 2013; Label: Self-released; Format: Free download

=== Singles ===
List of singles as lead artist, with selected chart positions, showing year released and album name
Title	Year	Peak chart positions							Certifications	Album
Title	Year	US Bub.	US R&B/HH Airplay	US Latin Airplay	US R&B/HH	US Rhythm	US Heat	US R&B	Certifications	Album
"Gangsta"	2013	12	48	—	—	25	13	13		My Garden
"Crazy"	2014	—	—	45	40	26	—	—		My Garden
"Money Party" (featuring Polly A.)	2014	—	—	—	—	—	—	—		non-album single
"I Think I'm in Love"	2015	—	—	—	—	—	—	—		My Garden
"Friday Night Majic"	2017	—	—	—	—	—	—	—		Non-album singles
"Sirens"	2017	—	—	—	—	—	—	—		Non-album singles
"Manipulator"	2017	—	—	—	—	—	—	—		Non-album singles
"Body and Soul"	2017	—	—	—	—	—	—	—		Non-album singles
"I'm Doin Good"	2019	—	—	—	—	—	—	—		Seven
"—" denotes a title that did not chart, was not released in that territory, or did not receive certification.

=== Guest appearances ===
List of non-single guest appearances, with other performing artists, showing year released and album name
Title	Year	Album	Artist(s)
"Lluvia Negra"	2012	Puro	Heny Puro
"Helen Keller"	2013	Suffering from Success	DJ Khaled
"Ain't Seen A Thing"	2014	Hardships and Humiliation	Decon Chrome
"Mash It Up"	2015	Black Lion Reggae Invasion Vol. 1	Black Lion, The Wizard, Nyanda, The Kemist
"Warning"	2017	Plata O Plomo	Fat Joe, Remy Ma
"Save Me from the Rain"	2017	Good Life	Collie Buddz

== Music videos ==
Song	Year	Director
"Devil's Command"	2013	Edwin Escobar
"Gangsta"	2013	Samantha Lecca
"Happy and I Know It"	2014	X Marlon Santini
"The High"	2014	Michael Garcia
"Crazy"	2014	Rankin
"My Garden"	2015	Michael Garcia
"I Think I'm in Love"	2015	Sam Lecca
"Run It Up"	2016	Monique Chavez
