= The Liberation Tour (Christina Aguilera) =

2018 concert tour by Christina Aguilera

- National tour by Christina Aguilera
- Promotional poster for the tour
- Location: U.S., North America
- Associated album: Liberation
- Start date: September 25, 2018
- End date: November 13, 2018
- No. of shows: 21
- Supporting act: Big Boi (select dates)
- Attendance: 21,260
- Box office: $8.7 million
- Website: Liberate Your Love

Christina Aguilera concert chronology
- Back to Basics Tour (2006–2008); The Liberation Tour (2018); The Xperience (2019–2020)

The Liberation Tour was the fifth concert tour and first U.S.-only tour by American singer Christina Aguilera. The tour was launched in support of her eighth studio album, Liberation (2018), beginning on September 25, 2018 at the Hard Rock Event Center in Hollywood, Florida and concluding on November 13 of the same year at the Mahaffey Theater in St. Petersburg. The tour visited cities across the United States throughout 21 concerts. A series of scheduled shows in October including one in Orillia, Canada, were cancelled due to Aguilera's illness and safety concerns. After finishing her Back to Basics Tour in November 2008, Aguilera took a break from touring to focus on her family. The Liberation Tour was her first concert tour in 10 years. It was the first tour in support of Liberation. After its conclusion, Aguilera announced The X Tour in early 2019, which ran concurrently with her first concert residency The Xperience in Las Vegas. The X Tour promoted the album through 18 concerts held in Europe and Mexico.

The Liberation Tour ranked at #132 on Pollstar's 2018 Year-End Top 200 North American Tours chart with a total gross of $8.7 million with an attendance of 177,854. Reviews for the tour were positive, being named one of the best 2018 live shows by Billboard. Critics complimented Aguilera's stage presence and vocals, with additional praise for the set list.

== Background and development ==
Following the conclusion of the Back to Basics Tour in 2008, Aguilera scheduled a concert tour for her sixth studio album, Bionic (2010) for summer 2011. The tour was later cancelled, and Aguilera didn't tour for 10 years in order to focus on her family. After releasing Lotus (2012), Aguilera wouldn't release an album for another six years. Liberation was released on June 15, 2018 to critical acclaim. Before the release of the album, Aguilera announced The Liberation Tour in support of the album on May 9, 2018. American rapper Big Boi was announced as the tour's opening act. Aguilera asked fans on social media what songs would they like to be added to the set list and also teased some photos and videos from the behind the scenes of the tour visuals and rehearsals. To promote the tour, Aguilera made an appearance on Jimmy Kimmel Live! on September 12, 2018.

On September 23, two days prior to the start of the tour, a website titled "Liberate Your Love" was launched. Aguilera asked fans who were attending the show with a loved one to use the website to submit their love stories. While performing "Unless It's with You", a song about wanting to not during the encore, Aguilera would bring fans up on stage to share these stories and facilitate several marriage proposals. This would be followed by "Let There Be Love", which was labelled as a "reception" by Aguilera. The tour kicked off on September 25, 2018 in Hollywood, Florida. During the show, an unreleased song, seemingly titled "Wonderland", was played as an interlude in between songs.

The Liberation Tour concluded on November 13, 2018 after playing 21 shows across the United States. To promote the Liberation in other territories, Aguilera kicked off The X Tour the following year as a continuation.

== Critical reception ==
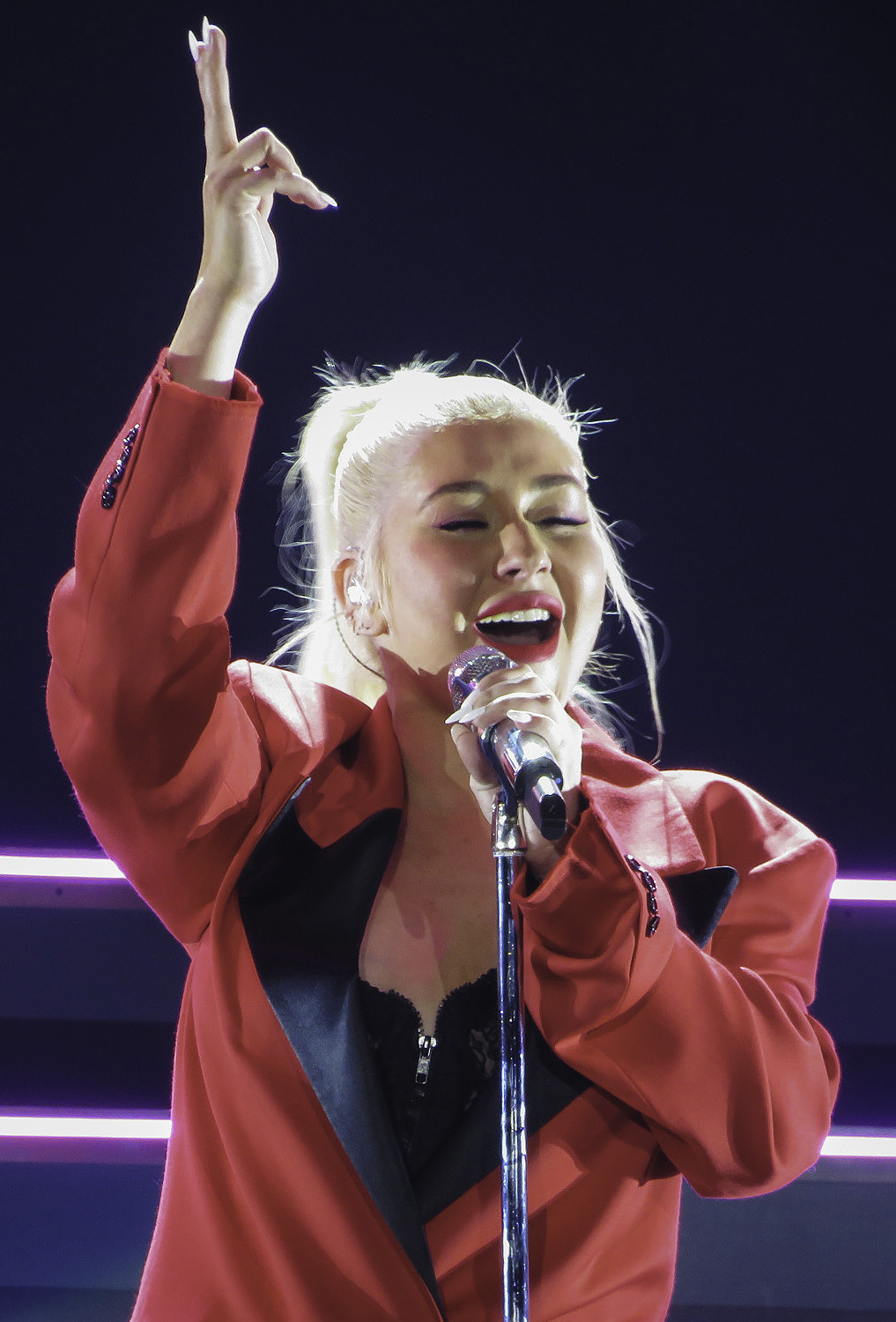
Aguilera performing at the Pepsi Center in Denver

The tour received positive reviews from critics. Many praised Aguilera's vocals and stage presence and felt the show focused on the "hits" as well as the new material. Kori Hazel (303 Magazine) felt the show in Denver was too heavy on entertainment, with the singer recreating the many iterations of her career. He says: "So, as the setlist bounced between nostalgia and new tunes, many in the audience were left impressed, dancing and singing along throughout. Such is the case of extended absences—the artist is left to reach, hoping to connect with the expectations they left to either their benefit or their detriment." Lucas Villa (AXS) stated the concert in Las Vegas was a return to form for Aguilera, after taking a decade break from touring. He continues: "It took over 10 years, but the Liberation Tour was worth the wait. Seeing Aguilera being able to truly bask in what she's created over 19 years and being liberated from all the pressures and naysayers that have followed her throughout her career was beautiful, no matter what they say."

In Sugar Land, Jesse Sendejas, Jr (Houston Press) thought the show was a form of therapy for Aguilera's devoted fans, as she served her hits while showing her appreciation to the audience. He wrote: "The love fest continued through the night with Aguilera sometimes blocking songs together to recall specific albums, like a run from 2010's Bionic, or back-to-back songs from films she's been involved with over the years. If Aguilera is angling for a Vegas residency, the Liberation tour seems like a winning audition." For the Atlanta show, Melissa Ruggieri (The Atlanta Journal-Constitution) stated this comeback tour proved Aguilera is still a definitive figure within the pop landscape. She writes: "Though she's been playing much smaller venues than on her last arena tour, Aguilera didn't scrimp on visuals. [...] Aguilera's voice consistently retains the intensity of her chart-topping years, she's still a distinctive force."

The Liberation Tour was named one of the best 2018 live shows by Billboard.

== Commercial performance ==
The Liberation Tour ranked at #132 on Pollstar's 2018 Year-End Top 200 North American Tours chart with a total gross of $8.7 million with an attendance of 177,854.

== Set list ==
1. "Liberation" (Introduction) (contains elements of "Searching For Maria")
2. "Maria"
3. "How Did I Get Here" (Interlude)
4. "Genie in a Bottle"
5. "Queen Is Back" (Interlude)
6. "Dirrty"
7. "Sick of Sittin'"
8. "Can't Hold Us Down"
9. "Right Moves" (Interlude)
10. "Deserve"
11. "Accelerate" (Extended Mix)
12. "Elastic Love" / "Woohoo"
13. "Bionic" (contains excerpts of "Not Myself Tonight")
14. "Old Cartoons" (Interlude)
15. "Express" / "Lady Marmalade"
16. "Back In The Day" (Interlude)
17. "Ain't No Other Man"
18. "Wonderland" (Interlude)
19. "Say Something" (with Colin Smith)
20. "It's a Man's Man's Man's World"
21. "Fighter"
22. "Dreamers" (Interlude)
23. "Fall in Line"
24. "Twice"
25. "Underwater" (Interlude)
26. "Beautiful"

Encore

27. "Unless It's with You"
28. "Let There Be Love"

Notes

- Starting on September 28, "Keep on Singin' My Song", "What a Girl Wants", and "Come On Over Baby (All I Want Is You)" were added to the set list.
- During the first show in New York City, A Great Big World and Lil' Kim joined Aguilera to perform "Say Something" and "Lady Marmalade", respectively. Lil' Kim would perform with Aguilera again the next night.
- During the St. Petersburg concert, "The Voice Within" replaced "Keep on Singin' My Song".

== Shows ==
List of concerts
Date (2018)	City	Country	Venue	Attendance	Revenue
September 25	Hollywood	United States	Hard Rock Event Center	2,934 / 2,963	$534,056
September 28	Atlantic City	United States	Hard Rock Live	3,881 / 3,881	$351,037
September 30	Oxon Hill	United States	The Theater at MGM National Harbor	2,594 / 2,759	$391,657
October 3	New York City	United States	Radio City Music Hall	11,290 / 11,290	$1,122,464
October 4	New York City	United States	Radio City Music Hall	11,290 / 11,290	$1,122,464
October 6	Uncasville	United States	Mohegan Sun Arena	6,051 / 6,876	$716,316
October 8	Boston	United States	Wang Theatre	3,368 / 3,472	$339,739
October 16	Chicago	United States	Chicago Theatre	6,118 / 6,952	$663,018
October 17	Chicago	United States	Chicago Theatre	6,118 / 6,952	$663,018
October 19	Denver	United States	Pepsi Center	4,069 / 4,069	$414,108
October 22	Oakland	United States	Paramount Theatre	2,832 / 2,832	$416,550
October 26	Los Angeles	United States	Greek Theatre	5,870 / 5,870	$636,308
October 27	Las Vegas	United States	The Colosseum at Caesars Palace	4,100 / 4,100	$496,595
October 29	Phoenix	United States	Comerica Theatre	4,027 / 4,027	$381,096
November 1	Sugar Land	United States	Smart Financial Centre	4,548 / 5,522	$437,586
November 3	Thackerville	United States	Global Event Center	3,450 / 3,450	$388,061
November 4	Tulsa	United States	Paradise Cove	1,665 / 1,665	$214,960
November 6	St. Louis	United States	Peabody Opera House	2,506 / 2,506	$246,177
November 9	New Orleans	United States	Saenger Theatre	2,468 / 2,468	$289,136
November 11	Atlanta	United States	Fabulous Fox Theatre	4,197 / 4,197	$407,197
November 13	St. Petersburg	United States	Mahaffey Theater	1,886 / 1,886	$336,002
Total				77,854 / 80,785 (96%)	$8,782,063

== Cancelled shows ==
List of cancelled concerts, showing date, city, country, venue, reason for cancellation and reference
Date (2018)	City	Country	Venue	Reason	Ref.
October 11	Orillia	Canada	Casino Rama Entertainment Centre	Originally postponed, the shows were eventually cancelled due to Aguilera losing her voice from illness	
October 13	Detroit	United States	Fox Theatre	Originally postponed, the shows were eventually cancelled due to Aguilera losing her voice from illness	
October 24	Indio	United States	Fantasy Springs Special Events Center	Safety concerns	

== Personnel ==
- Musical Director: Rob Lewis
- Photographer: Philip Macías
- Hair and Make-up: Etienne Ortega and Stephen Sollitto
- Stylist: Karen Clarkson
- Choreographer: Jeri Slaughter and Paul Morente, Ryan Ramirez
- Dancers: Charmain Baquiran, Gilbert Saldivar, Kai Lin, Monique Slaughter, Rebbi Rosie and Sophia Aguiar

=== Band ===
- Bass guitar: Ethan Farmer
- Guitar: Michael Herring
- Drums: Stanley Randolph
- Keyboards: Rob Lewis
- Backing vocalist: Andrea-Latrelle Lanz, Colin Smith, Erika Jerry and Emi Secrest

== See also ==
- List of Christina Aguilera concerts
- List of Christina Aguilera concert tours
