= Telepathy (song) =

- "Telepathy The Remixes" EP cover

Single by Christina Aguilera featuring Nile Rodgers

from the album The Get Down (Original Soundtrack from the Netflix Original Series)
- Released: August 23, 2016
- Genre: Disco
- Length: 3:11
- Label: RCA
- Songwriters: Sia Furler; Mikkel Storleer Eriksen; Tor Erik Hermansen
- Producers: Elliott Wheeler; Baz Luhrmann

Christina Aguilera singles chronology
"Change" (2016)	"Telepathy" (2016)	"Accelerate" (2018)

Nile Rodgers singles chronology
"Give Me Your Love" (2016)	"Telepathy" (2016)	"My Fire" (2017)

Music video
- "Telepathy" on YouTube

"Telepathy" is a song by American singer Christina Aguilera featuring American musician Nile Rodgers, recorded for the 2016 Netflix musical drama series The Get Down and included on the accompanying soundtrack of the same name. It was co-written by Sia in collaboration with Mikkel Storleer Eriksen and Tor Erik Hermansen. The track was produced by Elliott Wheeler and The Get Down director, Baz Luhrmann. While it was available to download from the soundtrack upon its release, it was promoted in Italy to contemporary hit radio as a single on August 23, 2016. Various remixes were also released throughout the following month.

Musically, "Telepathy" is a disco track reminiscent of the genre in the 1970s, reflecting the theme of the TV series, which documents the fall of disco and the rise of hip hop in that era. Aguilera's strong vocals were praised by music critics, with one in particular comparing her falsetto melismas to the style of Mariah Carey. "Telepathy" became Aguilera's ninth and Rodgers' fourth number-one song on the US Billboard Dance Club Songs chart, respectively. As a thank you gift to her fans, radio, and DJs for playing the track and making it number-one on the chart, Aguilera self-produced a short, disco-themed music video for the song.

== Background and release ==
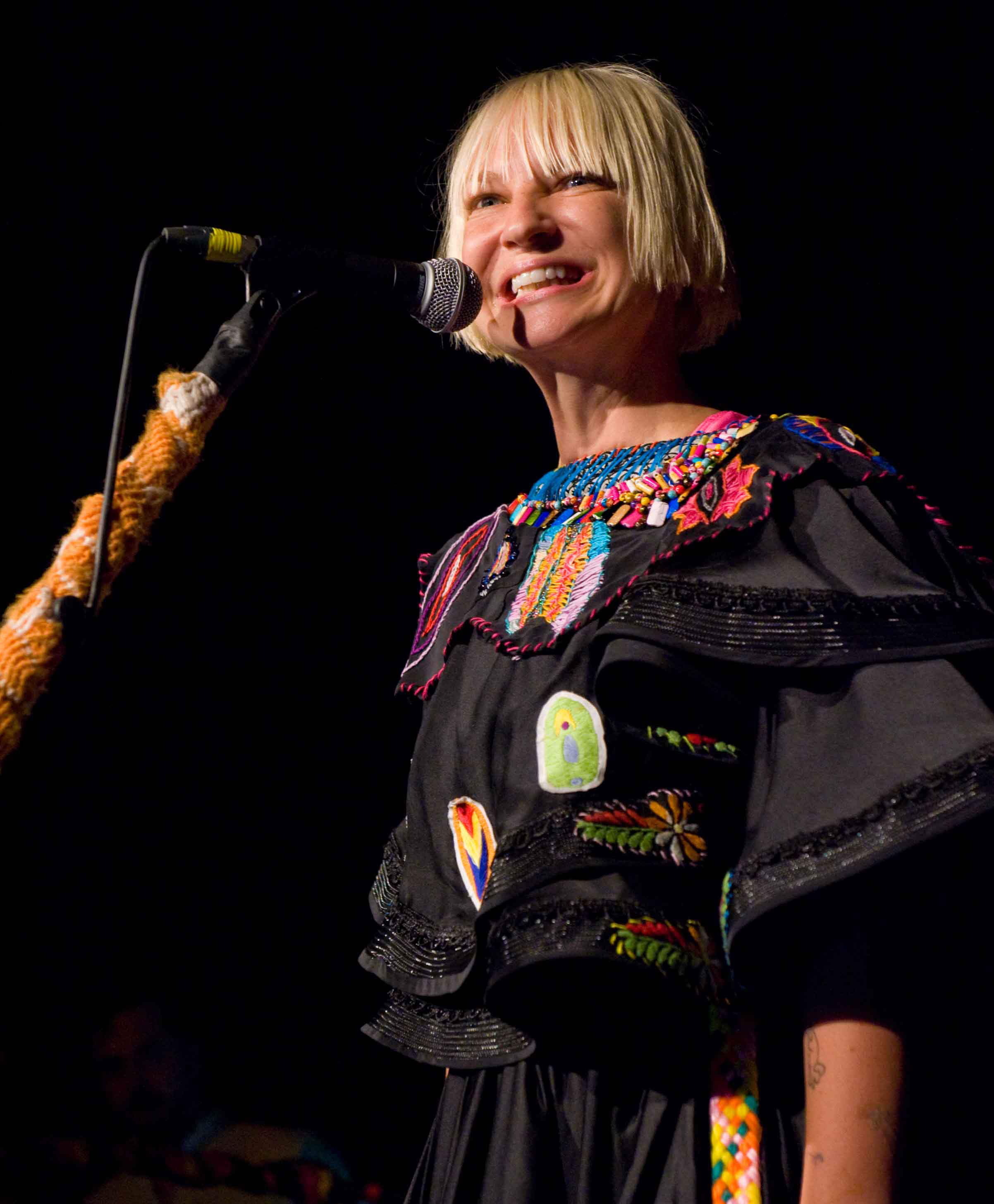
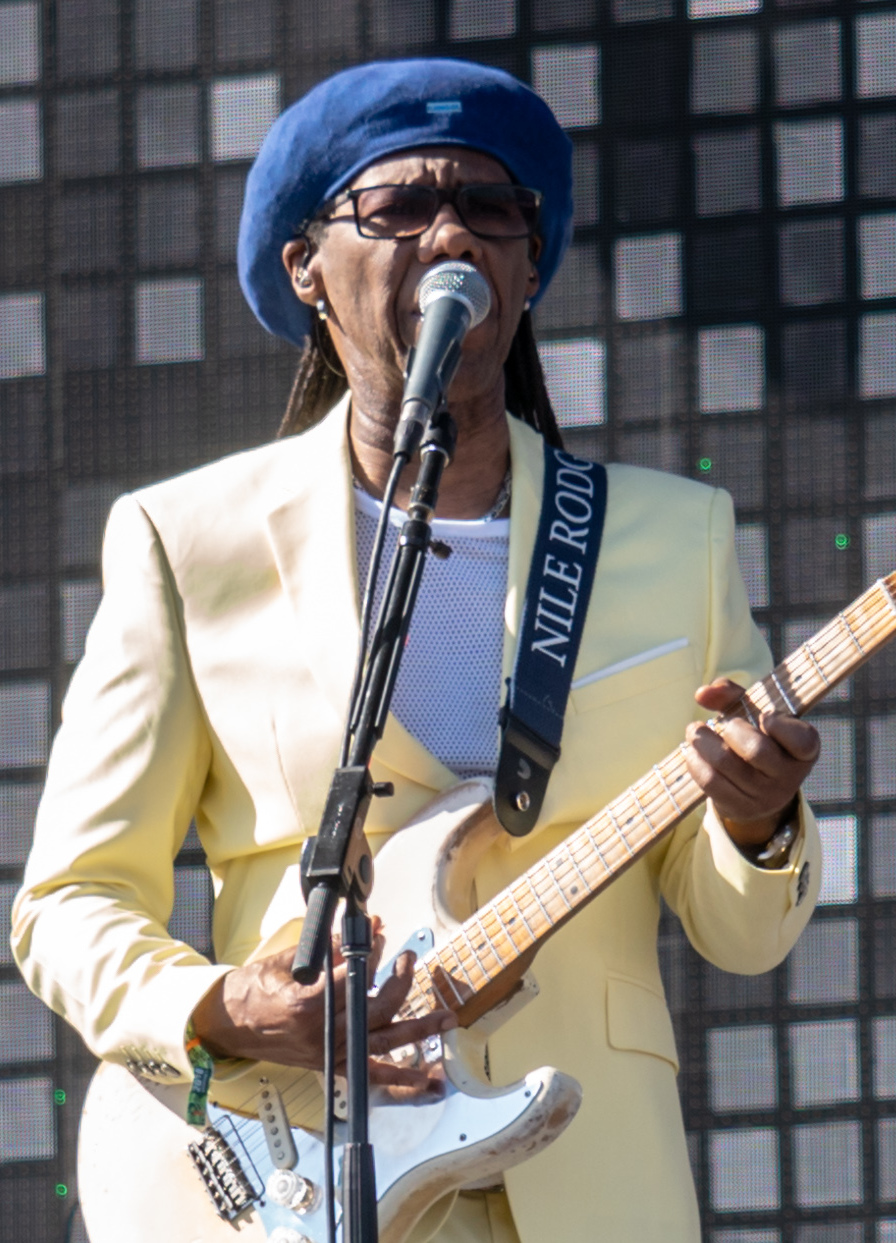
"Telepathy" was co-written by Sia (left) and features Nile Rodgers.

Composed and written by Sia, Mikkel Storleer Eriksen and Tor Erik Hermansen, "Telepathy" is a song recorded by Christina Aguilera featuring Nile Rodgers for the accompanying soundtrack to the Netflix musical drama series The Get Down (2016). The Get Down, directed by Australian Baz Luhrmann, is set in The Bronx in the late 1970s and chronicles the fall of disco and the rise of hip hop. Luhrmann, alongside Elliot Wheeler, produced "Telepathy", marking the second time he and Aguilera had worked together; Luhrmann directed the 2001 musical film Moulin Rouge! whereby Aguilera was one of the lead acts on the soundtrack single "Lady Marmalade". Furler recorded a demo version of the song but it has never been officially released.

The track listing for the soundtrack was released on August 4, 2016; Mike Wass of Idolator noted that "Telepathy" could possibly be a disco track given that Rodgers is credited as a featured artist and the disco theme of the series. "Telepathy" premiered on August 11, the day before the release of the soundtrack and TV series. The song was released in Italy to contemporary hit radio on August 23. Multiple remixes were commissioned and made available for digital download. On September 16, a six-track remix EP was released featuring remixes by Rare Candy, Eric Kupper, Solidisco, Malay & Young Bombs, Tobtok and Moto Blanco. Another remix by Le Youth was released September 30. Daniel Megarry of the Gay Times suggested that the release of the remixes was an effort to boost sales of the track.

== Composition ==
"Telepathy" is a disco song which lasts for a duration of three minutes, eleven seconds. The "dreamy" and "euphoric" instrumentation, provided by Nile Rodgers, Homer Steinweiss, Nick Movshon and Thomas Brenneck, consists of "vibrant" strings and horns, drums, brass and harps. PopCrush writer Bradley Stern noted that the addition of Rodgers "signature joyful, dance floor-friendly" sound adds a "touch of authenticity". Producer Nelson George described the track as being reminiscent of "1970s vogueing anthems popular at vogue-club balls like the House of LaBeija." Entertainment Weekly writer Joey Nolfi placed "Telepathy" somewhere in between the compositions of her fifth studio album Back to Basics (2006) and the lead single from her seventh album Lotus, "Your Body" (2012).

== Critical reception ==
"Telepathy" garnered a positive response from music critics. Writing for Idolator, Mike Wass was initially underwhelmed by "Telepathy" upon its release. According to him, he downloaded the song regardless, and added it to what he calls his "Upbeat Xtina" playlist. He writes that a few months later, the song played on shuffle and he realized that he had previously brushed off what he now believed to be one of the best and most underrated songs of 2016. Robbie Daw of the same publication was complimentary of Aguilera's vocal performance, opining that she "sings beautifully amidst a swirling wall of sound." He continued to write that it was a welcome change of tempo following the release of her previous single, "Change".

Bradley Stern from PopCrush described the song as a "shimmering, strut-friendly contribution to the soundtrack" and praised Aguilera's "mighty" vocals. He noted that while the disco sound is not necessarily an insight into the creative direction of Aguilera's upcoming eighth studio album, he would not be opposed to hearing more collaborations between the singer, Rodgers and the song's co-writer, Sia Furler. Digital Spy writer Lewis Corner described the "throwback" song as a "glittering disco track" and that her "massive vocals" complement the composition. Joey Nolfi of Entertainment Weekly described "Telepathy" as the "funkiest" release by Aguilera for several years, and Idolator ranked it at number five on its retrospective, 2020 list of Aguilera's forty best songs ever. Fuse.tv called it one of the best songs of 2016, and Digital Spy's Alim Kheraj shared the same sentiment. In a review for That Grape Juice "Telepathy" has been called "a glittery disco tune that beams with the success of experimentation", as well as "one of the best songs of 2016", and an underrated track in Aguilera's discography. In 2023, LGBTQ-related website Queer.pl called it a "gay classic".

== Chart performance ==
Commercially, "Telepathy" achieved the most success in the United States, where it reached number-one on the Billboard Dance Club Songs chart for the issue dated November 12, 2016. It reached the top twenty in its third week, charting at number 18, and topped the chart in its seventh. "Telepathy" became Aguilera's ninth number-one song on the Dance Club Songs chart—her first being "Beautiful" in 2003—and her first since "Say Something" with A Great Big World in May 2014; the track also became Rodgers' fourth chart-topper. Rodgers has achieved four number-ones since "I'll Be There", a collaboration with Chic, in June 2015; only Rihanna has achieved more number-one songs in that time span, with five. "Telepathy" also reached number 31 on the Billboard Twitter Top Tracks. Elsewhere, the song failed to replicate the same success. It reached the top 40 on the Urban chart in the Flanders region of Belgium, where it peaked at number 38 and spent a total of three weeks on the chart. In France, "Telepathy" spent one week at number 120.

== Music video ==
Due to the song's success on the US Dance Club Songs chart, Aguilera decided to self-produce a music video for "Telepathy" as a thank you gift, stating on Facebook "I wanted to make a fun video for my fans since 'Telepathy' from The Get Down is #1 on the Billboard Dance Club Songs Chart. Thanks to all the fans, radio and DJs loving the song!" However, it was pointed out by MTV News and Entertainment Weekly that at the time of Aguilera posting her message on Facebook, "Telepathy" was number-two on the chart and had not yet reached number-one.

Directed by Hannah Lux Davis, it is Aguilera's first music video as a soloist in four years and, despite the song being more than three minutes long, the video itself is 96 seconds in length. It consists of the singer sitting in a multi-colored room dressed in disco-themed sequined clothes, including knee-high boots, with a large hair style as she holds a disco ball. She is also seen lying down on a glittering pool table. Deepa Lakshmin of MTV News thought that given the theme of The Get Down, it "makes sense" that the video should be disco-themed. Writing for Billboard, Taylor Weatherby noted that the video is "short-but-sweet" and did not blame her for wanting to celebrate the song reaching number-one and having some fun. Joey Nolfi for Entertainment Weekly wrote that her large hair style was reminiscent of how she had it around the time of the release of Moulin Rouge!. Gay Times writer Daniel Megarry joked that the size of Aguilera's hair would "make RuPaul jealous".

== Live performances ==
The song was included in the setlist for Aguilera's Vegas residency Christina Aguilera: The Xperience (2019–2020). It was used as an interlude, followed directly by a hip hop song "Accelerate".

== Formats and track listings ==
- Digital download (Album version)
11. "Telepathy" (featuring Nile Rodgers) [from The Get Down (Original Soundtrack from the Netflix Original Series)] – 3:11
- Digital download (Remix)
1. "Telepathy" (featuring Nile Rodgers) [Le Youth Remix] – 4:19
- Digital download (Remix EP)
1. "Telepathy" (featuring Nile Rodgers) [Rare Candy Radio Mix] – 3:16
2. "Telepathy" (featuring Nile Rodgers) [Eric Kupper Radio Mix] – 3:40
3. "Telepathy" (featuring Nile Rodgers) [Solidisco Remix] – 4:00
4. "Telepathy" (featuring Nile Rodgers) [Malay & Young Bombs Remix] – 3:22
5. "Telepathy" (featuring Nile Rodgers) [Tobtok Remix] – 4:46
6. "Telepathy" (featuring Nile Rodgers) [Moto Blanco Radio Mix] – 3:06

== Personnel ==
Credits adapted from Tidal.

- Vocals – Christina Aguilera
- Composers – Sia Furler, Mikkel Storleer Eriksen, Tor Erik Hermansen
- Lyricists – Sia Furler, Mikkel Storleer Eriksen, Tor Erik Hermansen
- Producers – Elliott Wheeler, Baz Luhrmann
- Conductor – Eric Hachikian
- Musicians – Nile Rodgers, Homer Steinweiss, Nick Movshon, Thomas Brenneck
- Mixing engineers – Chris Galland, Manny Marroquin

== Charts ==
Chart (2016)	Peak position
Belgium Urban (Ultratop Flanders)	38
Denmark (Dance Top 50)	18
France (SNEP)	120
Italy Airplay (EarOne)	67
US Dance Club Songs (Billboard)	1
US Twitter Top Tracks (Billboard)	31

== Release history ==
Country	Date	Format	Version	Label	Ref.
Worldwide	August 12, 2016	Digital download (as part of The Get Down soundtrack)	Original	RCA	
Italy	August 23, 2016	Contemporary hit radio	Original	RCA	
Worldwide	September 16, 2016	Digital download	Remix EP	RCA	
Worldwide	September 30, 2016	Digital download	Le Youth Remix	RCA	

== See also ==
- List of number-one dance singles of 2016 (U.S.)
