= Accelerate (Christina Aguilera song) =

2018 single by Christina Aguilera featuring Ty Dolla Sign and 2 Chainz

Single by Christina Aguilera featuring Ty Dolla Sign and 2 Chainz

from the album Liberation
- Released: May 3, 2018
- Studio: The Sanctuary (Los Angeles, CA)
- Genre: Hip hop; trap-pop; pop rap
- Length: 4:03
- Label: RCA
- Songwriters: Christina Aguilera; Kanye West; Mike Dean; Che Pope; Ernest Brown; Carlton Mays, Jr.; Bibi Bourelly; Ilsey Juber; Taylor Parks; Tyrone Griffin Jr; Tauheed Epps; Kirby Lauryen Dockery
- Producers: West; Dean; Pope; Charlie Heat (co.); Honorable C.N.O.T.E. (co.); Eric Danchick (add.)

Christina Aguilera singles chronology
"Telepathy" (2016)	"Accelerate" (2018)	"Fall in Line" (2018)

Ty Dolla Sign singles chronology
"OTW" (2018)	"Accelerate" (2018)	"Ooh Yeah" (2018)

2 Chainz singles chronology
"Medication (Remix)" (2018)	"Accelerate" (2018)	"Big Bank" (2018)

Music video
- "Accelerate" on YouTube

"Accelerate" is a song by American singer Christina Aguilera and was released as the lead single from her eighth studio album Liberation (2018). It features guest vocals from singer Ty Dolla Sign and rapper 2 Chainz. The song was produced by Kanye West alongside Che Pope, Mike Dean and Eric Danchick, with co-production from Honorable C.N.O.T.E. and Charlie Heat. In the lyrics, which celebrate living in the moment, Aguilera "accelerates" her sexual partner, wanting him to "show passion" towards her.

Upon its release, music critics were mostly positive towards the track — some complimented it for being "weird", "experimental", and an interesting comeback that "pushes pop music boundaries". The Guardian and Paper both named it one of the best songs of the year. "Accelerate" became Aguilera's tenth number-one song on the US Billboard Dance Club Songs chart. The single appeared on a few national record charts, reaching top ten positions in Costa Rica, Panama and Guatemala, as well as number twenty-two on the Hungarian Single Top 40 chart. The song was included in the set lists for three of Aguilera's concert tours: The Liberation Tour (2018), The Xperience (2019–2020), and The X Tour (2019).

== Composition and recording ==
The song combines unaccented rhythmic patterns, and incorporates hip hop and trap-pop genres. "Accelerate" also draws from old-school Chicago techno, electro-funk, 1980s boogie and contemporary R&B. The track's electronic bassline was named an "explicit" throwback to the era of an acid house subgenre by Stereogum. Its outro was inspired by a doo-wop music genre. The song's production is characterized by synthesizer-generated beats. It also features tribal rhythmic structure, distinctive drum beats, and rap interludes by Aguilera, complemented by male supporting vocals. A percussive hi-hat is also incorporated into the song's melody.

"Accelerate" contains a sample of "I Like Funky Music" by Uncle Louie, and "I Feel So Good Inside", written by Ronald Brown, as performed by The Techniques IV. In the song's lyrics, Aguilera "accelerates" her sexual partner and urges him to show passion towards her, as she sings: "Accelerate, c'mon babe, pick up your speed; stamina, fill me up, that's what I need." The themes of the song include sex ("Another shot, you comin' home with me") and empowerment ("Get that moola, power, you on fire tonight"), which led music journalist Bradley Stern to compare the track to Aguilera's 2003 single "Can't Hold Us Down". Lucas Villa of AXS pointed out the feminist, "girl-power" tone of the lyrics. The song also celebrates personal freedom and living in the moment.

Ty Dolla Sign recalled the studio recording process in the Rolling Stone interview: "She [Aguilera] invited me to her crib to come finish the record. It was dope. We just went in there and I just heard her do her shit live in person. I was like 'What the fuck is this? It's incredible!'"

== Critical reception ==
Cole Delbyck praised the single as a "comeback worth waiting for" in his review for HuffPost. Jon Caramanica of The New York Times called "Accelerate" "fantastically weird", stating, "Ty Dolla Sign's moans and yelps, sinuous keyboard lines, a charmingly staccato verse from 2 Chainz. Somewhere in there is Ms. Aguilera, under-singing and trying not to get pushed into a corner. And yet despite these disparate inputs, there's something loose and admirable happening here: everyone is trying new things, and the disarray verges on flamboyance." According to MTV's Sam Prance, "Accelerate" is one of Aguilera's "most experimental releases to date," as well as "an instantly memorable pulsating club bop." Billboard called the single "a stormy comeback" with high energy, while The Guardian regarded it as catchy and a "promising comeback", noting Aguilera's "incredible" vocals. The Fader praised Aguilera for her "brave artistic choice" and assured that upon a deeper listen, the song's weirdest and most interesting sounds become "addictive". Brock Radke of Las Vegas Magazine believed "Accelerate" to be a "pulsating, rhythmic track" that "defies categorization and reaffirms Aguilera's dedication to pushing past pop boundaries". Bradley Stern from MuuMuse considered "Accelerate" to be the antithesis of a pop song. He called the single "an aggressively fucks-free, polarizing hip-hop cut", as well as "a fresh and strange listen from start to finish".

Sheldon Pearce of Pitchfork said it is "certainly a liberation from something, though it's unclear what. There's a fun song (or two) trapped in here somewhere, between several mutations, but without any sort of constancy or meaningful direction, it isn't much of a song at all; it's a series of disjointed episodes with superfluous parts. 'Accelerate' is unnecessarily mixing and inflating ideas when far less would do." Hugh McIntyre, a contributor to Forbes, was critical of the song, saying "'Accelerate' sounds like it's headed somewhere, but it never actually arrives. The track is disappointingly one-note, and once you've heard what it has to give in the first few seconds, there isn't a lot more to discover. The drum-heavy production immediately catches the ear, but it never develops and grows, and there's no powerful hook that requires a replay".

The British magazine i-D ranked the song on a list of the Best Pop Comebacks of the 21st Century.

=== Rankings ===
Accolades for "Accelerate"
Critic/Publication	List	Rank	Ref.
The Guardian	50 Best Songs of May 2018	Ranked	
The Guardian	Top 100 Songs of 2018	82	
i-D	Best Pop Comebacks of the 21st Century	70	
Idolator	Christina Aguilera's 40 Best Songs	11	
The Interns	30 Best Songs of 2018 (So Far)	9	
Paper	Top 100 Songs of 2018	49	
Pop Hates Flops	18 Best Songs of 2018	1	
Stereoboard	7 Standout Christina Aguilera Moments	Ranked	

== Chart performance ==
In the United States, the song peaked at number twenty-four on the Bubbling Under Hot 100 in the week of May 19, 2018. It became Aguilera's tenth number-one song on the US Billboard Dance Club Songs chart — her seventh of the 2010s decade.

Elsewhere, the song had minor commercial success, reaching number six in Spain's digital component chart, and number twenty-two on the Hungarian Single Top 40. In the United Kingdom and Canada, "Accelerate" charted on the digital sales component charts in each country, although in the UK it also reached number 99 on the biggest singles of midweek list compiled by the Official Charts Company. It peaked at number thirteen on the German Black Chart. Throughout Europe, "Accelerate" also appeared on charts in France, Greece, and Scotland.

The song achieved commercial success in Latin American countries, charting within the top ten of three radio airplay charts. As reported by Monitor Latino, "Accelerate" reached number three on the Panama Anglo Top 20 chart, number six on the Costa Rica Anglo chart, and number eight on the Guatemala Anglo chart. Commercially, it also performed well in Indonesia, as reported by LIMA.

== Music video ==
An accompanying music video for "Accelerate", directed by fashion photographer Zoey Grossman, premiered via Aguilera's YouTube channel on May 3, 2018. Ty Dolla Sign and 2 Chainz do not appear in the video, as it only stars the singer herself.

Additionally, a vertical video for the song was released exclusively via Spotify on the same day.

== Live performances ==
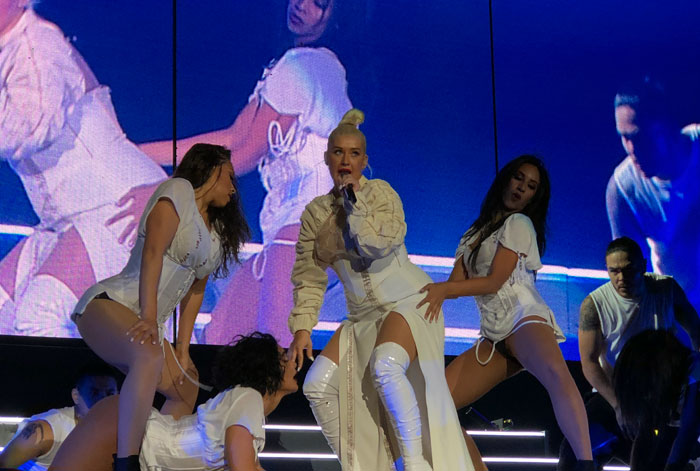
Aguilera performing "Accelerate" on the Liberation Tour

On May 31, 2018, Pandora Radio hosted a listening party as a preview for a then-upcoming album Liberation. Aguilera sang parts of "Accelerate" during the meeting with journalists. On June 9 she performed the track, along with "Fall in Line", at the Genentech Gives Back benefit concert in San Francisco. The next day she made a surprise appearance during the Los Angeles Pride Parade. Her performance of a dance remix of "Accelerate" featured a group of drag queens. The song was then included in the set lists for three of Aguilera's tours: The Liberation Tour (2018), Christina Aguilera: The Xperience (2019–2020), and The X Tour (2019).

== Personnel ==
Credits adapted from RCA Records and Discogs.

- Vocals – Christina Aguilera
- Co-lead vocals – Ty Dolla Sign, 2 Chainz
- Songwriters – Christina Aguilera, Kanye West, Mike Dean, Che Pope, Ernest Brown, Carlton Mays, Jr., Bibi Bourelly, Ilsey Juber, Tayla Parx, Tyrone Griffin Jr., Tauheed Epps, Kirby Lauryen Dockery
- Producers – Kanye West, Mike Dean,
- Co-producers – Charlie Heat, Honorable C.N.O.T.E.; Eric Danchick (additional producer), Noah Goldstein (add. prod.)
- Audio engineer – Noah Goldstein, Oscar Ramirez
- Additional vocals – Kirby Lauryen Dockery

== Charts ==
=== Weekly charts ===
Chart (2018)	Peak position
Canada Digital Song Sales (Billboard)	49
Costa Rica Anglo (Monitor Latino)	6
France (SNEP)	157
French Digital Singles (SNEP)	154
Germany (Deutsche Black Charts)	13
Greece International (IFPI Greece)	100
Guatemala Anglo (Monitor Latino)	8
Hungary (Single Top 40)	22
Panama Anglo (Monitor Latino)	3
Scottish Singles Sales (Official Charts)	74
Spain Physical/Digital (PROMUSICAE)	6
UK Singles Downloads (Official Charts)	71
US Bubbling Under Hot 100 (Billboard)	24
US Dance Club Songs (Billboard)	1

=== Year-end charts ===
Chart (2018)	Position
Germany (Deutsche Black Charts)	178
US Dance Club Songs (Billboard)	42
