= Not Myself Tonight =

2010 single by Christina Aguilera

Single by Christina Aguilera

from the album Bionic
- Released: April 6, 2010
- Recorded: 2009
- Studio: The Red Lips Room (Beverly Hills, CA); The Boom Boom Room (Burbank, CA)
- Genre: Electropop; electro-R&B; dance-pop
- Length: 3:05
- Label: RCA; Sony Music
- Songwriters: Greg Curtis; Ester Dean; Jamal Jones; Jason Perry
- Producer: Polow da Don

Christina Aguilera singles chronology
"Keeps Gettin' Better" (2008)	"Not Myself Tonight" (2010)	"Woohoo" (2010)

Music video
- "Not Myself Tonight" on YouTube

"Not Myself Tonight" is a song by American singer Christina Aguilera for her sixth studio album Bionic (2010). It was released by RCA Records as the lead single from the album on April 6, 2010. Produced by Jamal Jones a.k.a. Polow da Don and co-written in collaboration with Greg Curtis, Ester Dean and Jason Perry, "Not Myself Tonight" is an EDM, R&B, and pop song, which explores Aguilera's adoption of different personas on the dance floor.

"Not Myself Tonight" received mixed to positive reviews from contemporary music critics: some of whom praised the song's musical style, while others criticized its lyrics. Internationally, the song reached Top-5 peaks in Hungary and Japan, while reaching Top-15 in Canada, Scotland, Italy and the United Kingdom. Elsewhere, the song peaked inside the Top-40 in a total of 21 countries, including the United States where it peaked at number 23 on the US Billboard Hot 100. Additionally, the song peaked at number one on the Dance Club Songs chart. The single was certified gold by the Australian Recording Industry Association (ARIA) for shipments exceeding 35,000 copies in Australia.

An accompanying music video for "Not Myself Tonight" was directed by Hype Williams, and was released on April 28, 2010. Serving as an homage to the music video for Madonna's "Express Yourself", the video was S&M-themed. To promote the song, Aguilera performed "Not Myself Tonight" at the 2010 MTV Movie Awards, VH1 Storytellers and The Oprah Winfrey Show, amongst others.

== Background and release ==
"This song was just me and Ester [Dean] freestyling one day as another friend of mine was jumping and dancing around the studio. Christina's people reached out and asked if I had anything hot for her. I sent this, which happened to fit the fresh, different angle Christina told me she wanted to hit people with on this album."

— Songwriter and producer Polow da Don on "Not Myself Tonight".

After the birth of her son, Max Bratman, Aguilera stated in an interview with Ryan Seacrest that her forthcoming album would include a totally new aspect of herself as an artist, because of the pregnancy with her son. During an interview with People in 2008, Aguilera stated that she was going to start recording new material for her forthcoming album at her home in Beverly Hills. Aguilera listened to a lot of electronic music during her pregnancy, and she was inspired to include the genre on Bionic.

Aguilera originally considered servicing the track "Glam" as the lead single from Bionic. However, after the conclusion of a day-long countdown on her website on March 23, 2010, it was announced that "Not Myself Tonight" would be released as the official lead single instead. The single cover was simultaneously released, featuring a black-and-white image depicting Aguilera as a devil, dressed in a black leather suit with devil ears and a tail. Tamar Anitai from MTV Buzzworthy compared Aguilera's look on the cover to Madonna and Lady Gaga. The lyrics of "Not Myself Tonight" were released the following day, and an eighteen-second snippet of the song was previewed on March 26. On March 30, the track was streamed in its entirety through Aguilera's official website. The single officially impacted US contemporary hit radio on April 6, 2010.

== Composition ==
"Not Myself Tonight"
A 19 second sample of "Not Myself Tonight", an uptempo electropop, electro-R&B and dance-pop song with tribal house elements

"Not Myself Tonight" is a "straight forward", uptempo electropop, electro-R&B and dance-pop song, which incorporates elements from tribal house. Written in the key of G minor, it has a moderate tempo of 120 beats per minute. Aguilera's vocals on the track span from the low-note of G_{3} to the high-note of D_{5}. Aguilera opted to explore and create a "fresh, sexy feel using both electronic and organic elements with subject matter ranging from playful to introspective" in the track; the track features "dripping" synthesizers, "pulsing" basslines and house drums in its instrumentation. Eric Henderson from Slant Magazine compared "Not Myself Tonight" to Britney Spears songs "Gimme More" and "If U Seek Amy" for having similar musical style.

Lyrically, "Not Myself Tonight" talks about Aguilera adopting a new persona and new musical experiments. At the beginning, Aguilera admits that "Tonight I'm feeling a little out of control". At the pre-chorus, she sings "The old me's gone and I feel brand new, and if you don't like it, fuck you", which takes aim at anyone who dismisses her new style; meanwhile, she declares her musical departure from her previous 1940s and 1950s inspired album Back to Basics (2006) at the chorus with the line, "I'm not myself tonight, tonight I'm not the same girl". The song also evokes sexual theme, with lyrics such as "I'm dancin' a lot, I'm takin' shots and I'm feelin' fine/ I'm kissin' all the boys and girls". Writing for Billboard magazine, Michael Menachem opined that Aguilera channeled a "more 'Euro-glamorous' version" of her previous alter ego "Xtina", featured in her 2002 hit "Dirrty" from Stripped.

== Critical reception ==
Professional ratings
Review scores
Source	Rating
Billboard	(positive)
BBC	3/5 stars
The Village Voice	(negative)

Upon its release, "Not Myself Tonight" received mixed to positive reviews from music critics. Stephen Thomas Erlewine from AllMusic picked "Not Myself Tonight" as one of the highlights from Bionic, while Michael Menachem from Billboard complimented Aguilera's vocal delivery and suggested that the track proved that "the current dance-pop craze would be incomplete without [Aguilera]". Digital Spy editor Nick Levine gave the single a four out of five stars rating, writing that "on first listen, it feels a bit too ordinary to be trailing such a potentially audacious long-player. However, after a few spins it becomes clear that this is far from a flop". On a negative side, Mesfin Fekadu from The Boston Globe described the single as "mediocre at best."

Sharon Dastur, program director of WHTZ New York, noted that "Christina definitely delivered on high expectation. It's well-produced, offering the tempo and energy that top 40 needs heading into spring, not to mention an amazing vocal." Fraser McAlpine writing for BBC Music praised the song's composition yet criticized its lyrics for "[not] escaping the feeling that she's only getting up in our collective grill once again with the sexy and the [atti]'tude". Gavin Martin from the Daily Mirror wrote that "Not Myself Tonight" "shows the post-natal Aguilera has pumped up her sex appeal. And, although her top-shelf strategy is hardly startling in its originality, it's accomplished with more class than her obvious competitors". On behalf of The Village Voice, Drew Hinshaw criticized Aguilera's vocals and lyrics on the song. Likewise, Dan Martin from NME opined that with the new musical style of Bionic and its lead single, Aguilera had very little chance to explore her vocal ability. Writing for Drowned in Sound, Richard Wink concerned that "Not Myself Tonight" showcased an "apparent identity crisis" that Aguilera experienced during the production of Bionic; he questioned whether the alter ego "Xtina" was "the character that represents a freewheeling, risk taking, carefree party girl" or the contrasting "mask a desperate popstar wears when they are struggling to maintain relevance".

=== Retrospective commentary and impact ===
In his retrospective commentary on the album Bionic, Billboard's Glenn Rowley called "Not Myself Tonight" a "brashly sexual lead single". The Gay Times writer Daniel Megarry labelled the song as "an empowering feminist anthem that blended a new electropop sound with the attitude of Aguilera's Stripped era". It was ranked as the 40th best song of 2010 by Digital Dream Door. Christopher Rosa from The Celebrity Cafe placed it at number nine on the list of Aguilera's ten best songs ever, calling it a "thumping, glittery synth sashay". According to Kelley Dunlap of BuzzFeed, "Not Myself Tonight" influenced Beyoncé's 2013 song "Drunk in Love". In 2020, the British magazine i-D ranked the song on a list of the Best Pop Comebacks of the 21st Century. Mike Wass from the Idolator ranked "Not Myself Tonight" at number three on his list of Aguilera's forty best songs. LGBTQ-related website Queer.pl called it a "gay classic".

== Chart performance ==
During its first week on U.S. radio, "Not Myself Tonight" became the most added song on Mainstream Top 40 (886 plays in its first six days) and Rhythmic Radio stations in the United States, debuting at number 27 on the Mainstream Top 40 (Pop Songs) chart. Digitally, it sold 77,000 copies in its first week, entering the Billboard Hot 100 chart at number 23, becoming Aguilera's third solo highest chart debut behind 2008's "Keeps Gettin' Better", which debuted at number 7, and 2006's "Ain't No Other Man", which opened at number 19. According to Nielsen BDS, the song reached a Billboard Hot 100 audience of 11.8 million after a week of airplay. "Not Myself Tonight" became a success on the Hot Dance Club Songs, peaking atop the chart. The single became an airplay hit in the US soon after its premiere, and it was the number one most requested song at WHTZ (Z100) New York. As of March 2011, the single has sold 368,000 copies in the US.

The track managed to peak at number 11 and 12 on the Canadian Hot 100 and the UK Singles Chart, respectively. In the UK, however, the single spent just six weeks in the top 100, with a chart run of 12–24–39–64–48–83. In Australia, "Not Myself Tonight" debuted and peaked at number 22, remaining at its peak position for a further week. Meanwhile, in New Zealand, the single charted at number 32 on the New Zealand Singles Chart and managed to remain on the chart for only one week. The single fared better in South Korea, debuting at number 4 on the Gaon International Digital Chart, and later peaking at number three. In Japan, it peaked at number three on the Billboard Japan Hot 100.

== Music video ==
=== Background and development ===
The music video for "Not Myself Tonight" was filmed from April 7 to 9, 2010, in Los Angeles, directed by Hype Williams. It officially premiered on Vevo on April 30, 2010. On working with Williams and the new looks she developed in the video, Aguilera stated, "...someone with that much of a catalog under his belt and success as a video maker, he's like a legend. So again entering into the collaborating factor, I didn't know what to expect ... and he's probably thinking the same about me. And when we walked away from working with each other, it was just a love connection. I wanted to maintain and keep consistent with the look of the album packaging and book, and I really wanted to keep all that in line, and so he really paid attention, and I think it's really iconic and classic. We totally made magic together on a creative level, it was absolutely amazing. He really got in and listened to where my music was at".

In the video for "Not Myself Tonight" (left), Aguilera paid tribute to Madonna's visual for "Express Yourself" (right).

Aguilera revealed that some of the inspiration for the music video came from her work in Burlesque, stating, "There is dancing, and I learned so much also as a dancer doing the Burlesque film, moving my body in ways that were, I feel, never as precise before [...] I really fell in love and I adapted that in the dancing for 'Not Myself Tonight', but it was really, really fun to take what I learned from the movie." She further elaborated, "A lot of that [video] was based on my visual inspiration. I took Hype into my salon area in my home ... it's like my creative den. He took the ideas and then took other ideas and related to the ideas, and it just was really iconic imagery." The video itself features a strong sexual theme with scenes of S&M and bondage, as well as scenes in a church and several prestigious-looking buildings. Aguilera wore several hairstyles and outfits, including many which were dominatrix-style. Make-up artist Kristofer Buckle, who worked on the set of the video, said that Aguilera "wanted to push it" during the shooting.

As Aguilera performs the song, she adopts identities of many different personas, including a sex kitten. She kisses a bound female dancer portrayed by Jenna Dewan, which reflects the song's lyrics ("I'm kissing all the boys and the girls"), and is being surrounded by look-alikes whom she dominates. The singer is seen wearing a special, glamorous eye clamps — in a scene which echoes Stanley Kubrick's dystopian film A Clockwork Orange, according to the entertainment industry-related website The Vigilant Citizen. The video features a church orgy and a clothes-burning scene which was likely inspired by George Michael's music video for "Freedom! '90".

According to Aguilera, the music video of "Not Myself Tonight" is a tribute to Madonna, citing her music videos as its major influence, most notably "Express Yourself" (1989). She viewed the visual for "Express Yourself" as "really strong and empowering which [she] always try to incorporate through my expression of sexuality." Several critics further noted that the S&M-inspired theme of the music video for "Not Myself Tonight" was also resembled other Madonna music videos such as "Human Nature" (1995) and "Like a Prayer" (1989). MTV News' Gil Kaufman also opined that Aguilera recalled her "Dirrty" video for sharing the same sexual depiction.

=== Reception ===
The music video to "Not Myself Tonight" received mixed reviews from music critics. James Montgomery of MTV News called the video "jaw-dropping". Ericka Sóuter of Us Weekly praised the video, noting that it has "one diva and twelve fierce looks". Tanner Stransky from Entertainment Weekly commented that the video was similar to visuals by Lady Gaga and Madonna, further noting that Aguilera "did indeed seem desperate" in the "unoriginal" clip, saying that "maybe she should have gone in a totally different direction to avoid comparisons". On behalf of Rolling Stone, Daniel Kreps stated that "Aguilera assumes no less than a dozen different guises, all scantily clad, ranging from carbon copies of Lady Gaga (borrowing heavily from her unique wardrobe), Madonna, Beyoncé, Gwen Stefani, the girls from Robert Palmer's 'Simply Irresistible' video and Michelle Pfeiffer's S&M-inspired Catwoman from Batman Returns. Despite the video's attempt to shock, it's unlikely Aguilera will ever out-Gaga Gaga or out-controversy Madonna. ... Hopefully next time she steps in front of the lens she'll be more herself and less like everyone else". Idolator's editor Mike Wass opined that "the Hype Williams’ directed video is equal parts fetish porn and high-fashion shoot". NME ranked the "Not Myself Tonight" music video at number 8 on its list of the "50 Worst Music Videos Ever". Writing for the Gay Times, Daniel Megarry believed the video was a clear tribute to Madonna but "its message was lost on critics".

In May 2020, as a result of the "#JusticeforBionic" social media campaign, the song's music video reached number one positions on the iTunes Top 100 Videos charts in multiple countries, including France, Spain, and the United States.

== Live performances ==
Aguilera first performed the song live on The Oprah Winfrey Show on May 7, 2010, in a black one-piece and long black trench coat with high boots, accompanied by green laser lights and smoke. Her dancers were dressed in Matrix-like costumes. She ad-libbed several times during the performance, at one point explaining the song's concept, stating to the audience, "This song is all about letting go and expressing yourself!" On June 8, 2010, Aguilera performed the song on The Today Show. She also performed the song on Live with Regis and Kelly on June 10, 2010, and as a part of her concert on CBS's The Early Show on June 11, 2010. Aguilera performed "Not Myself Tonight" in a medley with "Bionic" and "Woohoo" at the 2010 MTV Movie Awards. The song was also included on Aguilera's set for VH1 Storytellers.

Aguilera performed "Not Myself Tonight" on numerous occasions throughout the years, like the Justin Timberlake's all-star benefit show in Las Vegas in October 2010, the Mawazine Festival in Morocco in May 2016, and at the Black Sea Arena in Georgia in July 2016. In 2019, the Bionic single was included in the setlist for Aguilera's Vegas residency The Xperience. It was one of the two opening songs, along with "Your Body". The song was selected as a show opener for the singer's second concert residency Christina Aguilera at Voltaire (2023–2024), performed by Aguilera in a "mountainous gown" and a double-strand diamond necklace.

== Impact and legacy ==
A remix of "Not Myself Tonight" was featured in Christian Dior's "Cruise" fashion show in May 2010. The song was used in the 2023 Netflix comedy drama series Glamorous, starring Kim Cattrall. Farrah Moan paid tribute to Aguilera's attire from the "Not Myself Tonight" music video in a 2019 episode of Watch What Happens Live with Andy Cohen, where Aguilera also appeared as a guest. Similarly, Dorit Kemsley referenced Aguilera's "Not Myself Tonight" dress during her appearance at the 47th People's Choice Awards ceremony, where the singer received the Music Icon Award. The song was also performed by a contestant of a reality singing show Sing Your Face Off Thailand in 2019. Swiss figure skater Sarah Meier choreographed a dance routine to "Not Myself Tonight" in a show titled All That Skate.

== Awards and nominations ==
Year	Ceremony	Category	Result	Ref.
2010	EarOne Awards	Best Song	Won	
2010	You Choice Awards	Video of the Year	Won	
2011	MuchMusic Video Awards	Most Watched Video of the Year	Nominated	
2011	J-Wave Awards	Song of the Year	Nominated	
2011	Spetteguless Awards	Best Pop Song	Nominated	

== Track listing and formats ==
- Australian CD maxi single
1. "Not Myself Tonight" (Clean Version) — 3:05
2. "Not Myself Tonight" (Super Clean Version) — 3:05
3. "Not Myself Tonight" (Main Version) — 3:05
4. "Not Myself Tonight" (Instrumental) — 3:02
5. "Not Myself Tonight" (Call Out Hook) — 0:17
- German and South Korean maxi single
1. "Not Myself Tonight" (Main Version) — 3:05
2. "Not Myself Tonight" (Mark Roberts Ultimix Dirty) — 4:52
3. "Not Myself Tonight" (Jody den Broeder Radio Mix) — 3:31
- Digital download
1. "Not Myself Tonight" — 3:04
- Digital download (DJ Paulo Mixshow Remix)
1. "Not Myself Tonight" (DJ Paulo Mixshow Remix) — 5:46
- Digital download (DJ Paulo Radio Remix)
1. "Not Myself Tonight" (DJ Paulo Radio Remix) — 3:44
- Digital download (DJ Paulo Remix)
1. "Not Myself Tonight" (DJ Paulo Remix) — 7:59
- Digital download (Laidback Luke Mixshow Edit)
1. "Not Myself Tonight" (Laidback Luke Mixshow Edit) — 5:03
- Digital download (Laidback Luke Radio Edit)
1. "Not Myself Tonight" (Laidback Luke Radio Edit) — 3:39
- Digital download (EP)
1. "Not Myself Tonight" — 3:04
2. "Not Myself Tonight" (Mark Roberts Ultimix) — 4:52
3. "Not Myself Tonight" (Jody den Broeder Radio) — 3:31
4. "Not Myself Tonight" (Video) — 3:06
- Digital download (The Remixes)
1. "Not Myself Tonight" (Chus & Ceballos Club Vocal) — 6:54
2. "Not Myself Tonight" (Chus & Ceballos Iberican Christina Beats) — 5:10
3. "Not Myself Tonight" (Chus & Ceballos Stereo Club) — 6:20
4. "Not Myself Tonight" (Chus & Ceballos Stereo Instrumental) — 6:20
5. "Not Myself Tonight" (Chus & Ceballos Radio) — 3:56
6. "Not Myself Tonight" (Chus & Ceballos Radio Instrumental) — 3:55
7. "Not Myself Tonight" (Jody den Broeder Club) — 6:22
8. "Not Myself Tonight" (Jody den Broeder Dub) — 6:24
9. "Not Myself Tonight" (Jody den Broeder Mixshow) — 4:35
10. "Not Myself Tonight" (Jody den Broeder Radio) — 3:31
11. "Not Myself Tonight" (Mark Roberts Ultimix) — 4:52
12. "Not Myself Tonight" — 3:04
- Digital download (The Remixes) [Radio Edits]
1. "Not Myself Tonight" (Chus & Ceballos Radio) — 3:56
2. "Not Myself Tonight" (Jody den Broeder Radio) — 3:31
3. "Not Myself Tonight" (Mark Roberts Ultimix) — 4:52
4. "Not Myself Tonight" — 3:04

== Charts ==
=== Weekly charts ===
Chart (2010)	Peak position
Australia (ARIA)	22
Austria (Ö3 Austria Top 40)	26
Belgium (Ultratop 50 Flanders)	24
Belgium (Ultratip Bubbling Under Wallonia)	9
Brazil Dance (Crowley Broadcast Analysis)	7
Canada Hot 100 (Billboard)	11
Canada Hot AC (Billboard)	11
CIS Airplay (TopHit)	100
Czech Republic Airplay (ČNS IFPI)	38
Finland (The Official Finnish Download Chart)	29
Hungary (Editors' Choice Top 40)	21
Hungary (Single Top 10)	2
Germany (GfK)	24
Germany (Deutsche Black Charts)	14
Global Dance Tracks (Billboard)	7
Italy (FIMI)	12
Italy (Musica e dischi)	13
Japan Hot 100 (Billboard)	3
Mexico Anglo (Monitor Latino)	9
Mexico (Billboard Ingles Airplay)	12
Netherlands (Dutch Top 40)	18
Netherlands (Single Top 100)	32
New Zealand (Recorded Music NZ)	32
New Zealand Pop Airplay (Recorded Music NZ)	29
Poland (Polish Airplay New)	5
Poland (Polish Airplay TV)	3
Russia (2M)	12
Scotland (OCC)	11
Slovakia Airplay (ČNS IFPI)	12
South Korea International (Gaon)	3
Spain (Promusicae)	32
Sweden (Sverigetopplistan)	34
Switzerland (Schweizer Hitparade)	42
UK Download (OCC)	10
UK Singles (Official Charts)	12
US Billboard Hot 100	23
US Dance Club Songs (Billboard)	1
US Pop Airplay (Billboard)	14
US Rhythmic Airplay (Billboard)	38

=== Year-end charts ===
Chart (2010)	Position
Brazil (Crowley)	99
Japan (Japan Hot 100)	72
Japan (RIAJ Digital Track Chart)	72
Japan Adult Contemporary (Billboard)	28
Japan Radio Songs (Billboard Japan)	31
Lebanon (NRJ)	23
Spain TV Airplay (PROMUSICAE)	20
Taiwan (Hito Radio)	66
US Dance Club Songs (Billboard)	40

== Certifications and sales ==
Region	Certification	Certified units/sales
Australia (ARIA)	Gold	35,000^{^}
South Korea (Gaon)	—	258,935
United States	—	432,000
^{^} Shipments figures based on certification alone.

== Release history ==
Region	Date	Format(s)	Label(s)	Ref.
Italy	April 2, 2010	Contemporary hit radio	Sony Music	
United States	April 6, 2010	Contemporary hit radio	RCA	
Russia	April 9, 2010	Contemporary hit radio	Sony Music	
Australia	April 12, 2010	Digital download	Sony Music	
New Zealand	April 12, 2010	Digital download	Sony Music	
United Kingdom	April 12, 2010	Digital download	RCA	
United States	April 13, 2010	Digital download	RCA	
Germany	May 7, 2010	Digital download (EP)	Sony Music	
Belgium	May 18, 2010	Digital download (remixes)	Sony Music	
Finland	May 18, 2010	Digital download (remixes)	Sony Music	
Germany	May 18, 2010	Digital download (remixes)	Sony Music	
Norway	May 18, 2010	Digital download (remixes)	Sony Music	
Portugal	May 18, 2010	Digital download (remixes)	Sony Music	
Spain	May 18, 2010	Digital download (remixes)	Sony Music	
Sweden	May 18, 2010	Digital download (remixes)	Sony Music	
Switzerland	May 18, 2010	Digital download (remixes)	Sony Music	
Canada	May 11, 2010	CD	Sony Music	
United Kingdom	May 17, 2010	CD	RCA	
Germany	May 21, 2010	CD	Sony Music	

== See also ==
- List of Billboard Hot Dance Club Songs number ones of 2010
