= The Xperience =

Concert residency by Christina Aguilera (2019–2020)

Christina Aguilera: The Xperience
- Residency by Christina Aguilera
- Location: Paradise, Nevada, U.S.
- Venue: Zappos Theater
- Start date: May 31, 2019
- End date: March 7, 2020
- Legs: 4
- No. of shows: 24
- Attendance: 75,675
- Box office: $10.2 million ($12.84 million in 2025 dollars.)

Christina Aguilera concert chronology
- The Liberation Tour (2018); The Xperience (2019–2020); The X Tour (2019)

The Xperience (a portmanteau of Xtina + Experience) was the first concert residency by American singer Christina Aguilera. It was produced by Live Nation Entertainment and was performed at Zappos Theater at Planet Hollywood Las Vegas. The residency was held for 24 performances separated into four legs, starting on May 31, 2019, and concluding on March 7, 2020. Aguilera performed material from her discography, as well as several covers and remixes. A fifth leg was planned as the final leg of the residency, set to begin towards the end of 2020 and continue until November 21, but due to the COVID-19 pandemic, the shows were suspended and eventually canceled on September 30, 2020.

Christina Aguilera: The Xperience was themed around 70s disco and outer space, featuring galactic visuals and disco remixes. It also draws inspiration from the retrofuturism movement and Cirque du Soleil in its staging and fashion. The residency is divided into six acts, with each act being marked by its own theme, colors, textures and scents, playing into the residency's "multi-sensory" aspect. The show alludes to Aguilera's notorious nickname, Xtina, through its name, as well as the X-shaped catwalk. Christina Aguilera: The Xperience received positive reviews with critics complimenting the show's production, costuming and Aguilera's vocals.

== Background and development ==
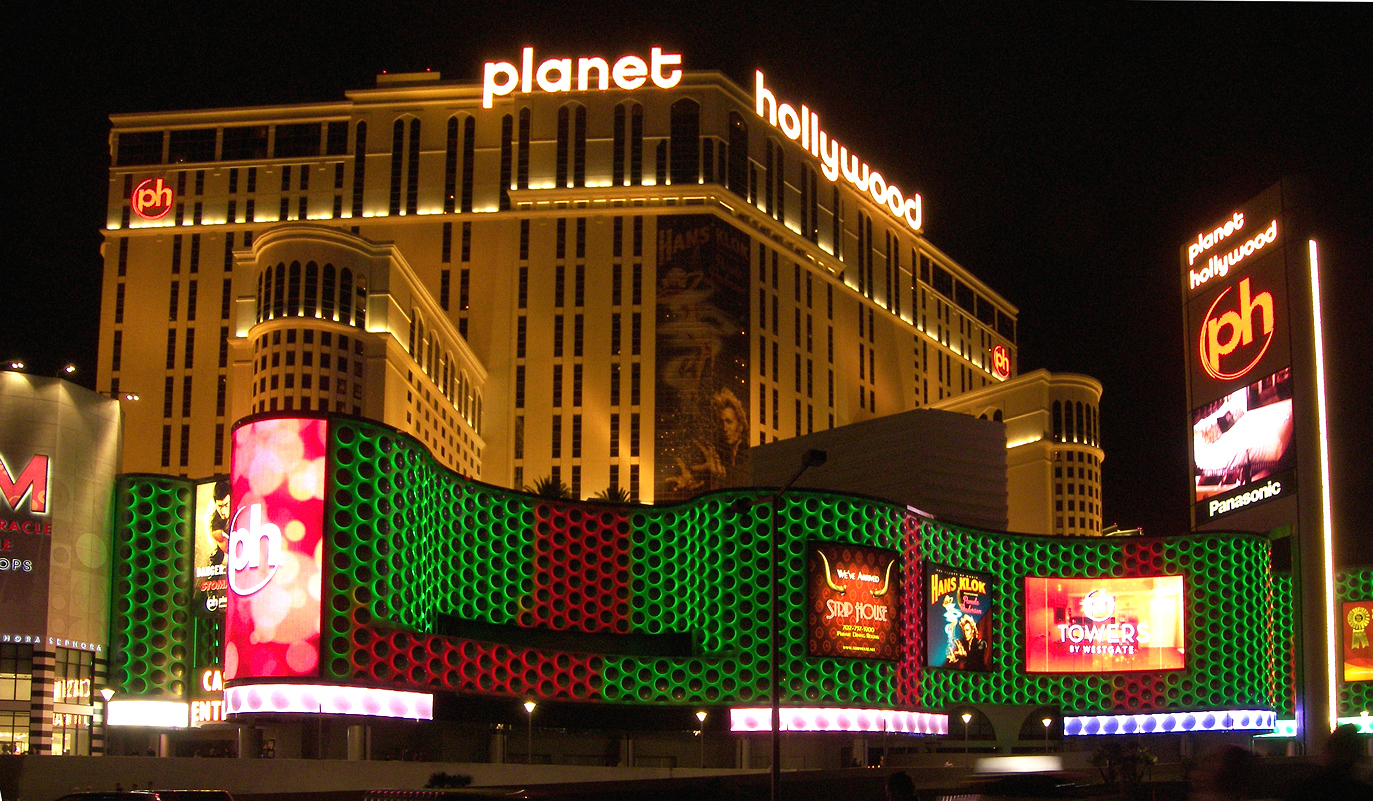
Christina Aguilera: The Xperience was held at Zappos Theater (now PH Live) at Planet Hollywood Las Vegas.

The residency had been quietly in talks for several years before its announcement. Aguilera had taken a break from touring for 10 years, following the conclusion of the Back to Basics Tour (2006–2008), due to her concern of touring with children. During this time she began planning the residency. Following the conclusion of The Liberation Tour, which visited North America between September and November 2018, Aguilera made a surprise appearance on The Ellen DeGeneres Show on January 29, 2019, where she made the official announcement of the residency. The first set of tickets released were the first and second leg, which took place between May and June, and September and October respectively. Fans who signed up through Aguilera's website would have access to the fan presale, which was available from January 30 at 10 a.m. PT, while American Express card members would have access to the presale starting from 12 p.m. PT the same day. Caesars Rewards members and Live Nation and Ticketmaster customers would have access to a second presale, starting at 10 a.m. PT the following day. All presales were available until 10 a.m. PT on February 1, 2019. Tickets became available to the general public on February 2, 2019, at 10 a.m. PT with ticket prices starting at $60, and a limited amount of meet and greets available. $1 from each ticket sold would benefit The Shade Tree, a non-profit shelter in Southern Nevada for women and children.

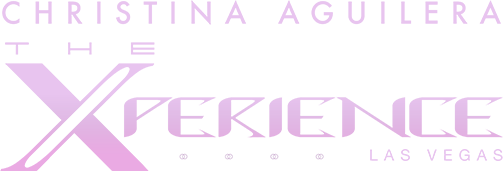
Logo used for the marketing of the residency.

When speaking about the set, Aguilera called it her most ambitious show yet. The poster used in the marketing for the show features Aguilera with pink sparkles on her face, forming a pink sparkly mask. This mirrored the show's intention to make the viewer remove the mask they wear everyday and "try on another one", making the show a "safe space" for the audience. Separated into several acts, Christina Aguilera: The Xperience was designed to be a five sensory experience, stimulating the five human perception senses: vision, hearing, scent, touch, and taste. The visual aspect of the show involved each act having its own distinct colors, fashion, and visuals. The music featured on the show included material from six English-language studio albums in Aguilera's catalogue, the Burlesque soundtrack (2010), and other singles. Several remixes were included in the show. Songs like "Your Body" and "Accelerate" were performed in the format of their official remixes, while "Can't Hold Us Down", "Candyman", and "Feel This Moment" were remixed to include elements of other songs. One of the main attractions of the show and the most emphasised aspect of the five sensory experience was the scent pumping system. Scent pumps were installed throughout the auditorium, providing a signature scent for each act. The audience could touch and interact with objects that descended from the ceiling, while the taste aspect of the show referred to orders that attending viewers could place, such as the Xtini (portmanteau of Xtina, Aguilera's nickname, and martini). Several numbers and visuals from the show were adapted and used on The X Tour, which ran concurrently with the residency. Aguilera released her thirteenth fragrance, Xperience, in 2019, which is named after the residency. A fifth leg was announced as the final leg of the residency. Due to the COVID-19 pandemic, the shows were put on hold. On September 30, 2020, the shows were canceled.

== Fashion and stage setup ==
The stage setup included the use of many LED screens. The show's intro sequence video plays on a retractable projection screen. The front LED screen is lined with arena lighting and laser lights, as well as a staircase leading to the band area, which is backed by another LED screen. Color changing orbs and disco balls would descend from the ceiling during their respective numbers. The stage also included a scent pumping system, confetti canons and CO_{2} jets supplied by QSFX USA. The catwalk of the stage had an X-shaped detail. The setup also included a metallic lotus flower, out of which Aguilera would emerge from during the show's opening number, as well as a staircase lined with candles, which was featured during the show's religious themed act. Outfits for the show were designed by Gareth Pugh and Bobby Abley, and styled by Karen Clarkson.

== Show synopsis ==
Christina Aguilera: The Xperience is divided into six acts, with an encore included into the sixth act. Each act follows a specific theme, which the colors of outfits, visuals, music, and the venue's scent system follow. The show incorporates material from Aguilera's discography, as well as covers of songs by Donna Summer, Whitney Houston, and Madonna. Several numbers in the show were reworked to include new songs, or to perform the songs in different acts. According to Billboard magazine, the show bolsters an "intensely theatrical experience".

The show's introduction involves a dancer wearing a space suit. The dancer takes off part of the suits and makes their way to a table with a mask on it. They put it on and the show's galactic intro video begins on the projection screen. The show opens with Aguilera's cover of Donna Summer's "I Feel Love" playing over the sound system. In the center of the stage a metallic dome shape opens in the form of a lotus flower, as Aguilera appears in the middle of it, opening the show with "Your Body", dressed in a futuristic white outfit with a detachable head detail. Aguilera originally followed up "Your Body" with "Not Myself Tonight" in the first two legs of the residency. It was later replaced by "Bionic", the title track from the same album, which was originally performed later in the show. Aguilera goes into her first two songs, "Genie in a Bottle", and "Reflection". An interlude features Aguilera painted in gold, sitting on a golden throne, before she comes onto the stage wearing a sequined gold outfit, complete with matching chaps to perform "Dirrty". The song is followed by a medley of "Vanity", "Express", and "Lady Marmalade". During "Express", Aguilera and her dancers venture into the audience.

A video interlude playing to Aguilera's 2018 single "Fall in Line" featuring Demi Lovato plays on the projection screen. Once the interlude ends, it cuts to a clip of Cher's "Mom, I am a rich man" interview, where she recounts her mother telling her that she needs to settle down and marry a rich man someday, with Cher responding that she is one, implying that she doesn't need a man. Peaches' "Boys Wanna Be Her" begins to play, as dancers appear on stage. The song transitions into Aguilera's own "Can't Hold Us Down". It is followed by "Sick of Sittin'". An interlude which mixes operatic background vocals with a hip hop beat plays, while dancers dance on the stage. The dancers disappear from the stage and Aguilera is heard saying "Expose your soul" over the speakers. The projection screen shows Aguilera wrapped in a blue veil blowing in the wind as a gregorian choir sings in the background along to bells and chimes. The first song of the act, "Maria", follows. As the song begins, Aguilera, dressed in a blue outfit reminiscent of a preacher's outfit, rises on a lift onto a platform on top of a staircase lined with candles, which is built in the center of the stage. In earlier versions of the show, "Maria" is followed by "Twice" and a cover of Whitney Houston's "I Love the Lord". The section was later revised and "Maria" transitions to a mashup of Aguilera's own "Makes Me Wanna Pray" and a cover of Madonna's "Like a Prayer". The songs transition into different versions of "What a Girl Wants" and "Come On Over Baby (All I Want Is You)".

The show then goes into "Ain't No Other Man". An interlude of "You Are What You Are (Beautiful)", an electro-pop remix of "Beautiful" featured on Keeps Gettin' Better: A Decade of Hits (2008). Aguilera's background singer, Avery Wilson, begins singing "Say Something" and is later joined by Aguilera, dressed in a red outfit. Several male dancers begin dancing together to "Glam". A remix of "Candyman" featuring excerpts of "I Want Candy" follows. Aguilera wears a pink and black bodysuit with light-up hearts across her chest and crotch under a big red coat. The coat is shed for the performance of "Woohoo". In earlier versions of the show, "Woohoo" is followed by "Elastic Love" and "Bionic". In later performances, "Bionic" is performed in the first act, while "Elastic Love" is cut entirely from the set list. The two halves of the act are separated through a video interlude where Aguilera is dressed in a sparkly outfit, while "Telepathy" plays. Aguilera returns to the stage performing a remix version of "Accelerate" and "Feel This Moment", which incorporates instrumental and vocal elements of "Desnudate".

Aguilera begins the show's encore featured in an interlude which shows her between the empty seats of a theater, wearing a sheer red outfit. She then begins singing "Beautiful" in a kimono, a reference to her childhood in Japan. The kimono is taken off to reveal the sheer red outfit from the interlude for the following number, "Fighter". The ending of "Fighter" leads to "Let There Be Love". The song is performed as the words "Live life in love" are shown onto the LED screens. The show finishes as the band ends the song.

== Critical response ==
Christina Aguilera: The Xperience received positive reviews for its production, message, and Aguilera's vocals. John Katsilometes of Las Vegas Review-Journal reacted positively saying, "This isn't a concert as much as it is a Disney blockbuster playing out in real time. Aguilera kicks out a series of acts seemingly unrelated, but all delivering a forceful message of individuality and empowerment." Melinda Sheckells of Billboard called the show, "A celebration of range, power and pride." Evan Real of The Hollywood Reporter wrote, "Aguilera's show served as a prism reflecting just a sample of her varying identities: sex-positive seductress, fierce feminist, soulful chanteuse and committed ally of the LGBTQ community. The pop superstar served up impressive vocals, visuals and couture costumes." Logo TV's Lamar Dawson provided a positive review, praising the "empowering" set and the way Aguilera tributed other pop divas: Cher, Whitney Houston, and Donna Summer. He went on to declare that the singer's "gay icon status is still in excellent standing".

== Accolades ==
Year	Award	Category	Result
2020	Best of Las Vegas Awards	Best Resident Performer/Headliner	Nominated
2020	Best of Las Vegas Awards	Best Production	Nominated
2020	Best of Las Vegas Awards	Bachelorette Party	Nominated

== Set lists ==
=== May 31 – October 5, 2019 ===
1. "The Xperience" (video introduction; contains elements of "I Feel Love")
2. "Your Body" (Martin Garrix Remix)
3. "Not Myself Tonight"
4. "Genie in a Bottle"
5. "Reflection"
6. "Golden Queen" (video interlude)
7. "Dirrty"
8. "Vanity" / "Express" / "Lady Marmalade"
9. "Fall in Line" (video interlude)
10. "Can't Hold Us Down" (contains excerpts from "Boys Wanna Be Her")
11. "Sick of Sittin'"
12. "Maria" / "Twice"
13. "I Love the Lord"
14. "What a Girl Wants" / "Come On Over Baby (All I Want Is You)"
15. "Ain't No Other Man"
16. "You Are What You Are (Beautiful)" (video interlude)
17. "Say Something"
18. "Glam" |(video interlude)}}
19. "Candyman" (contains excerpts from "I Want Candy")
20. "Woohoo"
21. "Elastic Love" / "Bionic"
22. "Telepathy" (video interlude)
23. "Accelerate" (Pink Panda Extended Mix)
24. "Feel This Moment" (contains excerpts from "Desnudate")
25. "Beautiful"
26. "Fighter"

Encore

27. "Let There Be Love"

=== December 28, 2019 – March 7, 2020 ===
1. "The Xperience" (video introduction; contains elements of "I Feel Love")
2. "Your Body" (Martin Garrix Remix)
3. "Bionic"
4. "Genie in a Bottle"
5. "Reflection"
6. "Golden Queen" (video interlude)
7. "Dirrty"
8. "Vanity" / "Express" / "Lady Marmalade"
9. "Fall in Line" (video interlude)
10. "Can't Hold Us Down" (contains excerpts from "Boys Wanna Be Her")
11. "Sick of Sittin'"
12. "Maria"
13. "Makes Me Wanna Pray"
14. "Like a Prayer"
15. "What a Girl Wants" / "Come On Over Baby (All I Want Is You)"
16. "Ain't No Other Man"
17. "You Are What You Are (Beautiful)" (video interlude)
18. "Say Something"
19. "Glam" (video interlude)
20. "Candyman" (contains excerpts from "I Want Candy")
21. "Woohoo"
22. "Telepathy" (Video Interlude)
23. "Accelerate" (Pink Panda Extended Mix)
24. "Feel This Moment" (contains excerpts from "Desnudate")
25. "Beautiful"
26. "Fighter"

Encore

27. "Let There Be Love"

== Shows ==
Date	Attendance	Gross
Leg 1
May 31, 2019	24,988 / 32,042 (78%)	$3,978,466
June 1, 2019	24,988 / 32,042 (78%)	$3,978,466
June 5, 2019	24,988 / 32,042 (78%)	$3,978,466
June 7, 2019	24,988 / 32,042 (78%)	$3,978,466
June 8, 2019	24,988 / 32,042 (78%)	$3,978,466
June 13, 2019	24,988 / 32,042 (78%)	$3,978,466
June 15, 2019	24,988 / 32,042 (78%)	$3,978,466
June 16, 2019	24,988 / 32,042 (78%)	$3,978,466
Leg 2
September 20, 2019	27,756 / 32,308 (86%)	$3,702,768
September 21, 2019	27,756 / 32,308 (86%)	$3,702,768
September 24, 2019	27,756 / 32,308 (86%)	$3,702,768
September 27, 2019	27,756 / 32,308 (86%)	$3,702,768
September 28, 2019	27,756 / 32,308 (86%)	$3,702,768
October 2, 2019	27,756 / 32,308 (86%)	$3,702,768
October 4, 2019	27,756 / 32,308 (86%)	$3,702,768
October 5, 2019	27,756 / 32,308 (86%)	$3,702,768
Leg 3
December 28, 2019	8,720 / 10,894 (80%)	$1,050,939
December 30, 2019	8,720 / 10,894 (80%)	$1,050,939
December 31, 2019	8,720 / 10,894 (80%)	$1,050,939
Leg 4
February 26, 2020	14,211 / 16,683 (85%)	$1,511,851
February 29, 2020	14,211 / 16,683 (85%)	$1,511,851
March 4, 2020	14,211 / 16,683 (85%)	$1,511,851
March 6, 2020	14,211 / 16,683 (85%)	$1,511,851
March 7, 2020	14,211 / 16,683 (85%)	$1,511,851
Total	75,675 / 91,927 (82%)	$10,244,024

== Cancelled shows ==
Date	Reason
December 27, 2019	Health reasons
February 28, 2020	Technical difficulties
November 11, 2020	COVID-19 pandemic
November 13, 2020	COVID-19 pandemic
November 14, 2020	COVID-19 pandemic
November 18, 2020	COVID-19 pandemic
November 20, 2020	COVID-19 pandemic
November 21, 2020	COVID-19 pandemic

== See also ==
- List of Christina Aguilera concerts
