= Elastic Love =

Song performed by Christina Aguilera

Song by Christina Aguilera

from the album Bionic
- Recorded: 2010
- Studio: Dubsided (Los Angeles, California); The Red Lips Room (Beverly Hills, California)
- Genre: Electro; electropop
- Length: 3:33
- Label: RCA
- Songwriters: Christina Aguilera; Dave Taylor; John Hill; Maya Arulpragasam
- Producers: John Hill; Switch

Licensed audio
- "Elastic Love" on YouTube

"Elastic Love" is a song recorded by American recording artist Christina Aguilera, taken from her sixth studio album, Bionic (2010). The song was written by Aguilera, M.I.A., John Hill and Switch, while production was handled by the latter two. Originally, "Elastic Love" was recorded by M.I.A., but later it was given to Aguilera. However, M.I.A. was disappointed when Aguilera didn't want to do her "trademark warbling" in the studio. "Elastic Love" is an electro and electropop song with strong elements from 1980s new wave music. Lyrically, Aguilera compares her love to office supplies, from paperclips to rubber-bands.

Upon its release, "Elastic Love" received favorable reviews from music critics, who praised the track's composition, its musical style and M.I.A.'s appearance on the song. Most of them praised it as the stand-out track on Bionic, while some of whom compared Aguilera's vocals on "Elastic Love" to those of M.I.A. and Gwen Stefani. The track was listed as the twelfth best song of 2010 by Amazon.com, and as the second best song of the year by The Village Voice's Andrew Stout. Following the release of Bionic, "Elastic Love" peaked on the Gaon International Digital Chart and the Gaon International Download Chart at number 78 and 59 on June 6, 2010, respectively.

== Background and development ==
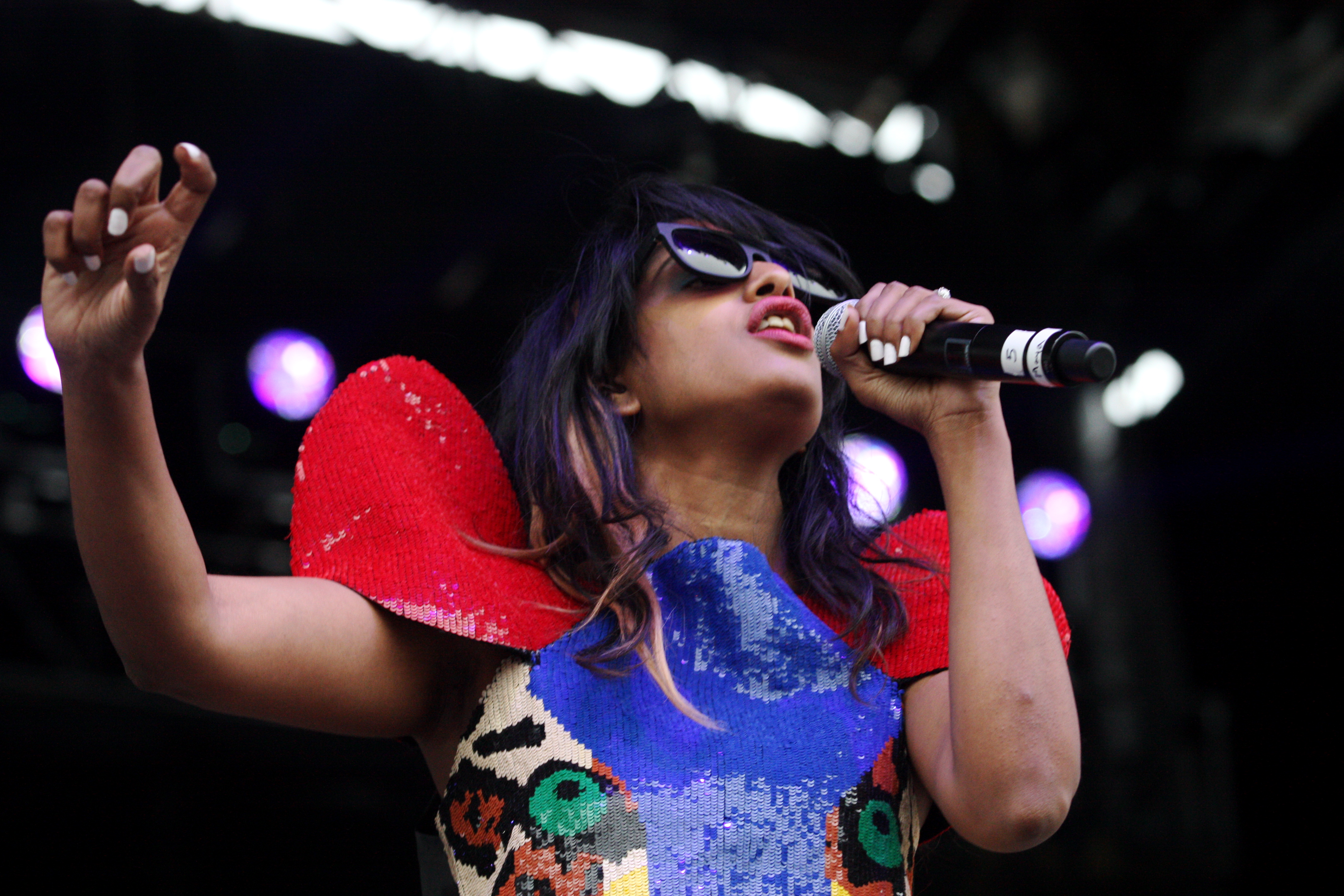
British-Tamil recording artist M.I.A. (photo) wrote "Elastic Love"

On the Asian leg of Aguilera's Back to Basics Tour during the summer of 2007, Aguilera revealed that her upcoming album would be "short, sweet and completely different" from her previous long-play Back to Basics (2006). After the birth of her son, Aguilera stated in an interview with Ryan Seacrest that her forthcoming album would include a totally new aspect of herself as an artist, because of the pregnancy with her son. During an interview with People in 2008, Aguilera stated that she was going to start recording new material for her forthcoming album at her home in Beverly Hills. On the album, which was titled Bionic, Aguilera was inspired by electronica music, which she heard a lot during her pregnancy.

British-Tamil recording artist M.I.A. was one of the songwriters of "Elastic Love". According to her, "Elastic Love" was the first track that she recorded, even before she started working on her debut album. She added, "It's the one I made in-between taking time out and having a baby and starting mine". When was asked about why she agreed to work with Aguilera, M.I.A. revealed, "Other people were involved who I respect like Peaches and it was like a sea of women coming together to write this new thing. Christina had also had a baby, you know, so it was kind of an interesting situation". Aguilera's decision not to perform her "trademark warbling" while recording the song disappointed M.I.A., as she detailed in an interview with MTV News UK:

I really thought I was going to be able to go in there and get her vocals on to the next level and she didn't want to do it. She was like 'You might think that's great because it's not what you do, but to me I'm really bored of it'. It's interesting getting to work with people who can do things vocally that you can't... but yeah I only heard the song for the first time when everyone else did.

== Recording and composition ==
"Elastic Love"
"Elastic Love" is an electro and electropop song with elements of 1980s new wave. Lyrically, Aguilera compares her love to office equipment.

"Elastic Love" was written by Christina Aguilera, M.I.A., John Hill and Switch. Production of the song was handled by the two latter, who also played all musical instruments in it. The track was recorded at Dubsided in Los Angeles, California. Aguilera's vocals were recorded at The Red Lips Room in Beverly Hills, California. "Elastic Love" lasts for a duration of 3:33 (three minutes and 33 seconds). It is an electro and electropop song which incorporates strong elements from 1980s new wave music. Its rhymes was described as "swapping sing-song-y" with "playground" chants. The track features "pulsating synth ping-backs" and an "808-esque backbeat" and Aguilera's "robotic" vocals. The melody of the track has been described as a "darker" tune and "unique". Aguilera's vocals on the track received comparisons to those of M.I.A. and Gwen Stefani.

Lyrically, Aguilera compares her love to office equipment, from paperclips to rubber-bands, as a metaphor for a relationship. The lyric "A rubber band is what I call your love for me, cause it comes and goes and pins me like a trampoline" was spoken by Aguilera at the beginning. The part "If I was a ruler I'd try to set you straight, but your love is like a sharpener, it really grates" was praised by several critics, while the lines "A rubber band was an analogy, you can even say it's a metaphor" were described by others as unnecessary, with Becky Bain for Idolator calling it "dumber-than-dumb". Toward the closing moments, she sings, "Paper clips they couldn't even hold us together... when your love hits, it sticks me like a stapler."

== Critical reception ==
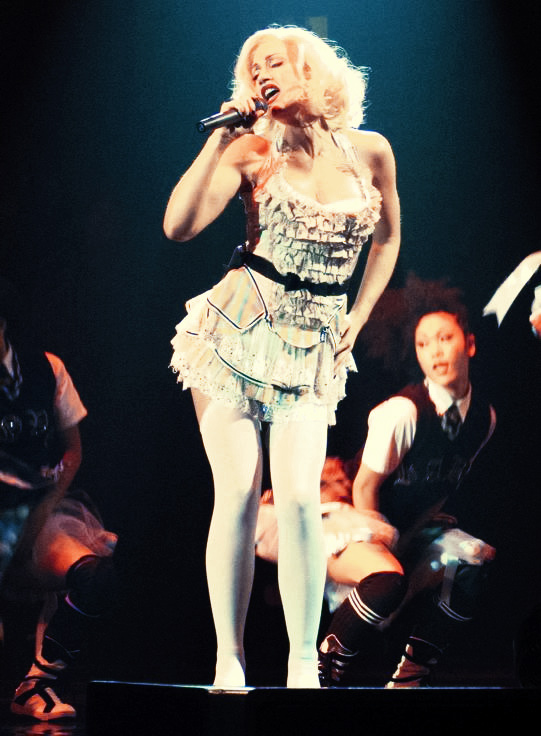
Aguilera's vocals on "Elastic Love" were compared to those of Gwen Stefani (photo) by Becky Bain for Idolator.

Upon its release, "Elastic Love" received positive reviews from most music critics. Ray Roa for Consequence of Sound wrote that "it sounds like a something that could make the stiffest indie-wallflowers bob their heads", while labeling it as "another forbearer of what looks to be one of the summer's best pop releases". HitFix's Melinda Newman wrote that the track is hypnotic with "adorably inane" lyrics, like "a nursery rhyme for adults set to the most infectious, trance track you can imagine". Stephen Thomas Erlewine for AllMusic picked "Elastic Love" as one of the four best tracks on Bionic and commented that the song has a "glassy chill". UK newspaper The Scotsman called it "eccentric", while Leah Greenblatt from Entertainment Weekly named it a "squiggly, hypnotic banger". Greg Kot from Chicago Tribune wrote that "Elastic Love" has the best moments of the album, with the electro beats and psychedelic arcade of sound effects. According to Attitude's Alim Kheraj, on "Elastic Love" Aguilera tones down her "powerhouse vocals" and displays versatility. Kheraj called the song "the album's stand-out track".

Writing for MusicOMH, Michael Cragg named it a "clattering, beat-driven masterpiece". Richard Wink from Drowned in Sound deemed it a "wonderful" track, which "makes up for the poor beginning to the album". He continued, "Aguilera dramatically simplifying her usual histrionic vocal delivery, which leads to some surprising results. The lyrics are throwaway, but clever like a dunce who has a happy knack of making a lucky guess". The Village Voice editor Drew Hinshaw wrote that her and M.I.A.'s lyrical chemistry acts as a "the real amorous game", calling it "a fun duet, suggesting a two-girls-at-play theme that doubles in size". Alexis Petridis from The Guardian deemed it the best song from the album, praising M.I.A.'s "incredible pop melody" and "off-kilter backing of squelching electronics and sub-bass" and observed how her instrumentation "has also uniquely managed to calm down Aguilera's usual attention-all-shipping vocal approach into something weirder: dead-eyed, thickly smeared with dubby echo". At the end of 2010, "Elastic Love" was listed at number 12 on the list of the year's best songs by Amazon.com. Similarly, in the annual Pazz & Jop critics poll of the year's best in music, "Elastic Love" was ranked as the second best song by Andrew Stout.

== Commercial reception and live performances ==
Upon the release of Bionic, "Elastic Love" debuted and peaked at number 78 on the Gaon International Digital Chart on the chart issue dated June 6, 2010, with a total of 303,768 streams. It also peaked at number 59 on the Gaon International Download Chart during the same week. The song was added to the set list of two Aguilera's tours: Liberation, and Xperience.

== Charts ==
Chart (2010)	Peak position
South Korea (Gaon International Digital Chart)	78
South Korea (Gaon International Download Chart)	59

== Credits and personnel ==
Recording locations

- Recording – Dubsided, Los Angeles, California
- Vocals recording – The Red Lips Room, Beverly Hills, California.

Personnel

- Songwriting – Christina Aguilera, Mathangi Arulpragasam, John Hill, Dave Taylor
- Producing – John Hill, Switch
- Instruments – John Hill, Switch

Credits adapted from the liner notes of Bionic, RCA Records.
