= The X Tour (Christina Aguilera) =

2019 concert tour by Christina Aguilera

- Transcontinental tour by Christina Aguilera
- Promotional poster for the tour designed by Play On Play Studio (Melbourne, Australia)
- Location: Europe; North America
- Associated album: Liberation
- Start date: July 4, 2019
- End date: December 7, 2019
- Legs: 2
- No. of shows: 18
- Supporting acts: Aloe Blacc; Drax Project; Hanna; Maruv; Alma
- Attendance: 100,000+

Christina Aguilera concert chronology
- The Xperience (2019–2020); The X Tour (2019); EU / UK Summer Series (2022)

The X Tour (a play on the singer's nickname, Xtina) was the sixth concert tour by American singer Christina Aguilera, in support of her eighth studio album, Liberation (2018). Led by LiveNation, it was surprise announced on the same day as the ticket sale by Aguilera herself on March 4, 2019, and serves as the European counterpart to The Liberation Tour the year before. The tour was scheduled to run concurrent with Aguilera's own Las Vegas concert residency, Christina Aguilera: The Xperience, with the tour running during the breaks of the residency. The tour was split into two legs, with the first leg consisting of 15 shows taking place across Europe, and an additional three in the second leg taking place in Mexico.

== Background and development ==
Following the announcement of The Liberation Tour, which toured across North America, Aguilera's fans began to ask her if there would be any shows in other continents. However, The Liberation Tour was never extended and did not visit territories outside of North America. To combat this, Aguilera planned the tour in secret as a surprise. When announcing her Las Vegas residency, Christina Aguilera: The Xperience, on The Ellen DeGeneres Show on January 29, 2019, Aguilera teased touring in Europe, saying: "I still want to see my fans all over and in Europe and everything [...]". On March 4, 2019, Aguilera took to social media to surprise fans by announcing the tour and that tickets would go on sale that same week, with some of the shows being already available.

Aguilera had last toured in Europe in 2006 with her Back to Basics Tour, with The X Tour marking her first the arena tour of the continent in twelve years. In March 2019 it was revealed that one of the cities the singer would visit will be Stuttgart. On June 26, 2019 it was announced that a New Zealand quartet Drax Project would open for Aguilera during her European concert tour. Aloe Blacc was a supporting act in Germany and Switzerland.

On September 13, 2019, Aguilera announced that The X Tour would be extended to include eight more shows in Europe, as well as three shows in Mexico. The pre-sale would last between September 18 and 19, with tickets going on sale on the 20.

== Commercial performance ==
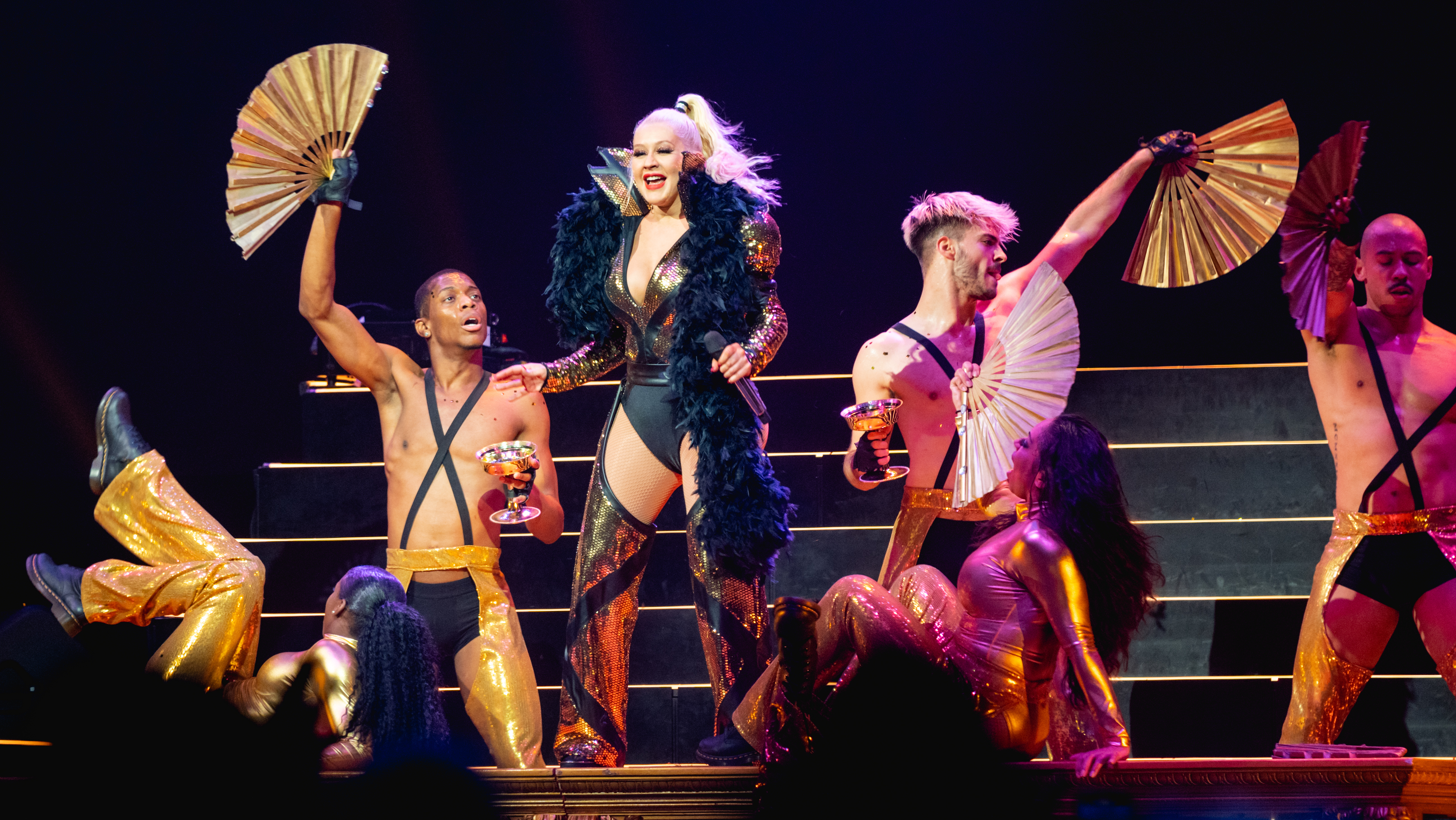
Aguilera performing at SSE Arena in London

Tickets for several shows were made available alongside the announcement, with the rest of the tickets for the nine announced shows going on sale that same week, Following the announcement, all 8,416 tickets for the tour's second show at the Sportpaleis in Antwerp, Belgium sold out. After conclusion of the first nine shows on July 23, 2019, Aguilera returned to Las Vegas to continue her residency, Christina Aguilera: The Xperience.

Due to the high demand, a second date was added for the following night in London.

== Critical response ==
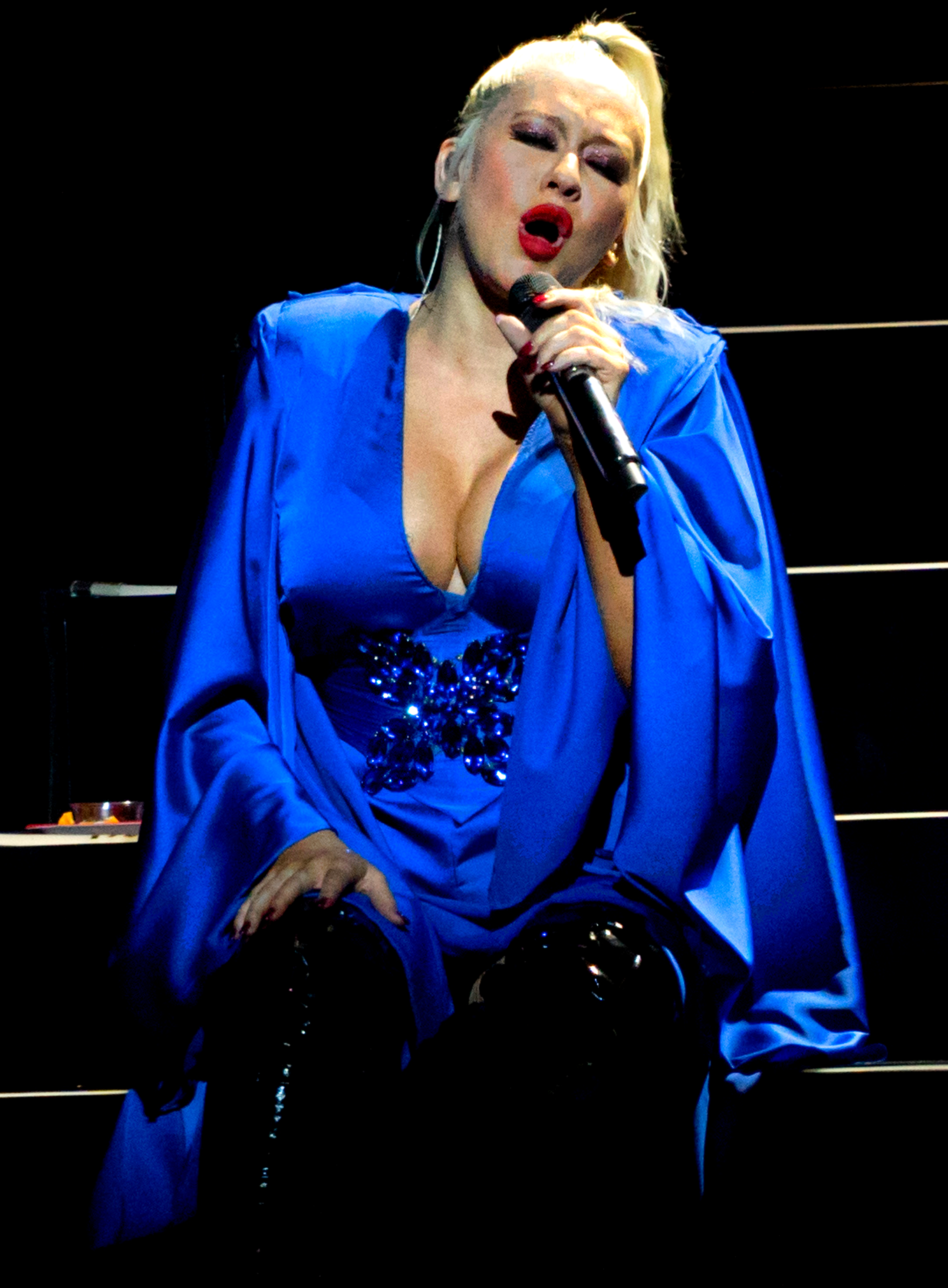
Aguilera performing at SSE Arena in London

The tour received strong critical praise. Katie Hawthorne of The Guardian opined that "this dazzling spectacle feels almost like a one-woman variety show, were it not for the eight dancers, three singers, full band and mountain of glitter". She complimented Aguilera's voice, calling it "genuinely jaw-dropping", "rich", and "powerful". Una Mullally, an editor of The Irish Times, noted that "as Aguilera explodes on to the stage, her current energy is as fierce as her past legacy". Tim Heap, writing for the gay-themed magazine Attitude, commended on the show's setlist: "For every high-energy banger, from a reworked 'Genie in a Bottle' to a 'Candyman'/'I Want Candy' mash-up, there’s a ballad that really lets the vocals soar". He gave the tour a four stars rating, and added: "It’s not always easy to be a fan of Xtina, but when live performances are this good, it’s worth it". Katie Fitzpatrick from Manchester Evening News wrote that, "From the punchy pop of 'Ain’t No Other Man' to the bugle bop on 'Candyman', this is a flawless and full-throttle journey through Aguilera's career—and the costumes are fabulous". She also noted that The X Tour "delivers the razzmatazz" of the singer's Las Vegas residency. Helsingin Sanomat's Anton Vanha-Majamaa provided a positive review, and praised the tour for its feminist statements, intense theatricality, and rich choreography. He called Aguilera "one of the most important stars on the pop music scene".

Metro's reviewer Rishma Dosani, who attended the show at Wembley Arena, praised Aguilera for her emotional performance of "Beautiful". Writing for Express & Star, Kirsten Rawlins stated that The X Tour was "a beautiful show from start to end, filled with messages of self-love, peace, and female empowerment—mixed in with smoulderingly sexy costumes and dance moves." She also called Aguilera an artist of "exceptional talent, power, and humanity".

== Accolades ==
| Year | Award | Category | Result |
|---|---|---|---|
| 2020 | SSE Live Awards | Best Solo Act | Won |

== Set list ==
This set list is from the July 4, 2019, show in Paris. It is not intended to represent all dates of the tour.

1. "Bionic"
2. "Your Body"
3. "Genie in a Bottle"
4. "The Voice Within"
5. "Dirrty"
6. "Vanity" / "Express" / "Lady Marmalade"
7. "Fall in Line"
8. "Can't Hold Us Down"
9. "Sick of Sittin'"
10. "Maria"
11. "Twice"
12. "Say Something"
13. "Reflection"
14. "What a Girl Wants" / "Come On Over Baby (All I Want Is You)"
15. "Ain't No Other Man"
16. "Candyman" / "I Want Candy"
17. "Accelerate"
18. "Feel This Moment"
19. "Beautiful"
20. "Fighter"
21. "Let There Be Love"

== Shows ==
Concert dates
| Date (2019) | City | Country | Venue | Opening act | Attendance | Revenue |
|---|---|---|---|---|---|---|
| July 4 | Paris | France | AccorHotels Arena | Drax Project | 4,750 / 8,000 | $432,934 |
| July 6 | Antwerp | Belgium | Sportpaleis | Drax Project | 8,416 / 8,416 | $547,752 |
| July 8 | Amsterdam | Netherlands | Ziggo Dome | Drax Project | —N/a | —N/a |
| July 11 | Berlin | Germany | Mercedes-Benz Arena | Drax Project | —N/a | —N/a |
| July 13 (Note: The July 13, 2019, show in Stuttgart, Germany at Schlossplatz is part of the Jazzopen Stuttgart concert series.) | Stuttgart | Germany | Schlossplatz | —N/a | —N/a | —N/a |
| July 15 (Note: The July 15, 2019, show in Locarno, Switzerland at Piazza Grande is part of the Moon and Stars concert series.) | Locarno | Switzerland | Piazza Grande | —N/a | —N/a | —N/a |
| July 19 (Note: The July 19, 2019, show in Pori, Finland at the Kirjurinloto Arena is part of the Pori Jazz concert series.) | Pori | Finland | Kirjurinluoto Arena | —N/a | —N/a | —N/a |
| July 21 | Saint Petersburg | Russia | Ice Palace | Hanna | —N/a | —N/a |
| July 23 | Moscow | Russia | VTB Indoor Arena | Maruv | —N/a | —N/a |
| November 5 | Dublin | Ireland | 3Arena | Alma | 4,942 / 4,942 | $504,865 |
| November 7 | Glasgow | Scotland | SSE Hydro | Alma | 7,175 / 7,474 | $693,909 |
| November 9 | London | England | SSE Arena | Alma | 15,999 / 16,537 | $1,637,550 |
| November 10 | London | England | SSE Arena | Alma | 15,999 / 16,537 | $1,637,550 |
| November 12 | Manchester | England | Manchester Arena | Alma | 9,693 / 9,693 | $891,516 |
| November 14 | Birmingham | England | Resorts World Arena | Alma | —N/a | —N/a |
| December 3 | Monterrey | Mexico | Auditorio Citibanamex | —N/a | 5,523 / 7,478 | $412,589 |
| December 5 | Zapopan | Mexico | Auditorio Telmex | —N/a | —N/a | —N/a |
| December 7 | Mexico City | Mexico | Palacio de los Deportes | —N/a | 8,632 / 12,000 | $855,353 |
| Total | | | | | 65,130 / 74,540 (87%) | $5,976,468 |

== See also ==
- List of Christina Aguilera concerts
- List of Christina Aguilera concert tours
