= The Get Down (soundtrack) =

2016 soundtrack album by various artists

Soundtrack album by Various artists
- Released: August 12, 2016
- Length: 47:41 (standard); 85:11 (deluxe)
- Label: RCA

The Get Down (Original Soundtrack from the Netflix Original Series) is the official soundtrack for the first part of the TV series The Get Down featuring various artists, released by RCA Records on August 12, 2016.

== Track listing ==
=== Standard version ===
| No. | Title | Performer(s) | Length |
|---|---|---|---|
| 1. | "Rule the World (I Came from the City)" (featuring Nasir Jones as Mr. Books) | Michael Kiwanuka | 2:57 |
| 2. | "Losing Your Mind" | Raury and Jaden Smith | 3:32 |
| 3. | "Shaolin's Theme / Pray" | Malay / 6LACK | 4:21 |
| 4. | "Black Man in a White World (Ghetto Gettysburg Address)" | Michael Kiwanuka featuring Nasir Jones as Mr. Jones | 2:44 |
| 5. | "Ball of Confusion" | Leon Bridges | 4:38 |
| 6. | "Cadillac" | Miguel | 5:16 |
| 7. | "You Can't Hide / You Can't Hide from Yourself (Touch of Class GMF Remix)" | Zayn / Teddy Pendergrass and Grandmaster Flash | 4:55 |
| 8. | "Hum Along and Dance (Gotta Get Down)" | Janelle Monáe | 3:01 |
| 9. | "(Are You Ready) Do the Bus Stop / Suga" | Fatback Band / Sarah Ruba | 3:25 |
| 10. | "Telepathy" | Christina Aguilera featuring Nile Rodgers | 3:10 |
| 11. | "Set Me Free" | Herizen Guardiola as Mylene Cruz featuring Nile Rodgers and The Americanos | 3:15 |
| 12. | "Just You, Not Now (Love Theme)" | Grace | 4:24 |
| 13. | "Zeke's Poem (I Am the One)" | Justice Smith as Ezekiel Figuero | 2:03 |
| Total length: | | | 47:41 |

=== Deluxe version ===
| No. | Title | Performer(s) | Length |
|---|---|---|---|
| 1. | "Welcome to the Get Down" | Jaden Smith | 1:17 |
| 2. | "Rule the World (I Came from the City)" (featuring Nasir Jones as Mr. Books) | Michael Kiwanuka | 2:57 |
| 3. | "Cadillac" | Miguel | 5:15 |
| 4. | "Losing Your Mind" | Raury & Jaden Smith | 3:39 |
| 5. | "You Can't Hide / You Can't Hide from Yourself (Touch of Class GMF Remix)" | Zayn / Teddy Pendergrass & Grandmaster Flash | 4:56 |
| 6. | "Black Man in a White World (Ghetto Gettysburg Address)" (featuring Nasir Jones as Mr. Books) | Michael Kiwanuka | 2:42 |
| 7. | "Shaolin's Theme / Pray" | Malay / 6LACK | 4:21 |
| 8. | "Ball of Confusion" | Leon Bridges | 4:39 |
| 9. | "Think (About It)" | Lyn Collins | 3:20 |
| 10. | "(Are You Ready) Do the Bus Stop / Suga" | Fatback Band / Sarah Ruba | 3:26 |
| 11. | "Telepathy" (featuring Nile Rodgers) | Christina Aguilera | 3:11 |
| 12. | "Bad Girls" | Donna Summer | 4:55 |
| 13. | "Hum Along and Dance (Gotta Get Down)" | Janelle Monáe | 3:03 |
| 14. | "Devil's Gun" | CJ & Co. | 3:35 |
| 15. | "Wild in the Streets" | Garland Jeffreys | 2:58 |
| 16. | "Que Lio" | Héctor Lavoe | 4:35 |
| 17. | "Just You, Not Now (Love Theme)" | Grace | 4:25 |
| 18. | "This Ain't No Fairy Tale" | Justice Smith as Ezekiel Figuero | 1:24 |
| 19. | "Be That as It May" | Herizen Guardiola as Mylene Cruz | 2:14 |
| 20. | "Get Down Brothers vs. Notorious 3" | The Get Down Brothers (Skylan Brooks, TJ Brown Jr., Jaden Smith, Justice Smith & Shameik Moore) | 3:34 |
| 21. | "Kipling Theme" | Kamasi Washington | 5:00 |
| 22. | "Set Me Free" (featuring Nile Rodgers & The Americanos) | Herizen Guardiola as Mylene Cruz | 3:14 |
| 23. | "Up the Ladder" | Herizen Guardiola as Mylene Cruz & Justice Smith as Ezekiel Figuero | 4:28 |
| 24. | "Zeke's Poem (I Am the One)" | Justice Smith as Ezekiel Figuero | 2:03 |
| Total length: | | | 85:11 |

== Charts ==
| Chart (2016) | Peak position |
|---|---|
| Belgian Albums (Ultratop Flanders) | 36 |
| Belgian Albums (Ultratop Wallonia) | 79 |
| Dutch Albums (Album Top 100) | 89 |
| French Albums (SNEP) | 98 |
| Spanish Albums (Promusicae) | 70 |
