= Fall in Line =

2018 single by Christina Aguilera

Single by Christina Aguilera featuring Demi Lovato

from the album Liberation
- Released: May 16, 2018
- Studio: The Guest House (Hollywood Hills, California, US)
- Length: 4:08
- Label: RCA
- Songwriters: Christina Aguilera; Johnny Simpson; Mark Williams; Audra Mae; Jon Bellion; Raul Cubina
- Producer: Jon Bellion

Christina Aguilera singles chronology
"Accelerate" (2018)	"Fall in Line" (2018)	"Like I Do" (2018)

Demi Lovato singles chronology
"I Believe" (2018)	"Fall in Line" (2018)	"Solo" (2018)

Music video
- "Fall in Line" on YouTube

"Fall in Line" is a song by American singer Christina Aguilera for her eighth studio album Liberation (2018), featuring guest vocals from American singer Demi Lovato. It was released as the album's second single on May 16, 2018 by RCA Records, impacting hot adult contemporary radio and contemporary hit radio on June 19 and May 28, respectively. Aguilera co-wrote the song with Johnny Simpson, Mark Williams, Audra Mae, Raul Cubina and Jon Bellion, while the production was handled by the latter.

"Fall in Line" is centered around lyrical themes of female empowerment, being recognized as a feminist anthem. The song received widespread acclaim from music critics, who commended Aguilera's and Lovato's vocals, as well as the lyrics and inspiring theme. Commercially, "Fall in Line" made minor impact on charts, but reached top-forty positions in Taiwan, Hungary and Guatemala, as well as the digital charts of Greece, Spain and the United States.

For promotion, an accompanying lyric video was uploaded onto Aguilera's official YouTube channel simultaneously with the song's release, followed by a music video directed by Luke Gilford. The singer also performed it on several occasions, including the Carpool Karaoke segment of The Late Late Show with James Corden, 2018 Billboard Music Awards, The Tonight Show Starring Jimmy Fallon, and Today Show. The song was nominated for Best Pop Duo/Group Performance at the 61st Annual Grammy Awards.

== Background ==
Aguilera described the song: "I wrote 'Fall in Line' a few years ago before all this news came out [Time's Up and Me Too movement]. It was the song that needed to be heard. Because of what I witnessed when I was growing up I always felt really driven to have a voice that my mom kind of never had in my childhood. So I've always wanted to be that advocate for women and anybody that was struggling to have their own voice. I watched my mom have to be submissive, watch her Ps and Qs or she's gonna get beat up. You can either be, unfortunately, so damaged by it that you take a turn for the worse, or you can feel empowered by it and make choices to never go down that route."

In June 2018, Aguilera appeared on DJ Zane Lowe's Beats 1 radio show, giving an interview about Liberation. The singer explained that the track was committed to everyone that felt disempowered, adding: "It's a message that I've preached [...] I think the chorus can fit anybody's feeling if they feel repressed, or oppressed, or whatever's going on in their lives that they feel they need to come to their own realization". Aguilera also revealed that she decided to work with Lovato because it was important to choose someone that is vocal about her own struggles and past, stating: "I wanted somebody that could 'come to play'", adding that she "put so much heart and passion into it" and teared up when first hearing her vocals on it. Aguilera also sent her flowers and mentioned "I was just like, 'Oh my God, you took it to the next level'". Lovato also noted that, "It’s easy to say that Christina’s legacy is her vocals, but for me it’s been more than that. [...] Her legacy is teaching people to stay true to who they are."

In November 2018, it was revealed in the lyrics for Bellion's song "Adult Swim" from studio album Glory Sound Prep that Beyoncé was also interested in securing the song for her Parkwood Entertainment signees Chloe x Halle (thought to be for their debut album The Kids Are Alright), but the song had already been secured by Aguilera.

== Release and promotion ==
"Fall in Line" premiered on May 16, 2018, at 8 a.m. EST, and was released commercially for digital download worldwide at the same time. Aguilera stated in a tweet: "To anyone who's ever felt silenced and repressed, the truth seekers and bold thinkers...may you liberate your voice and break the mold, never back down, and never fall in line."

== Recording ==
Aguilera co-wrote "Fall in Line" alongside Johnny Simpson, Mark Williams, Audra Mae, Jon Bellion, and Raul Cubina, while the production was handled by Jon Bellion. The track was recorded at The Guest House in Hollywood Hills, California, while the mixing was handled by Manny Marroquin at Larrabee Sound Studios. The mastering was performed by Dave Kutch at The Mastering Palace, New York City. Instrumentation for the song included trumpet and flugelhorn by Ryan Svendsen.

== Composition ==
"Fall in Line" is performed in the key of C major with a slow tempo of 40 beats per minute, and the vocals span from the low note of E_{3} to the high note of C_{6}. The song has been described as a "feminist anthem" and a sequel to Aguilera's 2003 song, "Can't Hold Us Down" with a lyrical content of women's rights. The introduction to the song is the track "Dreamers", which "features a group of young girls declaring goals like 'I want to be a journalist', 'I want to be heard', 'I want to be president.'" Aguilera stated that the track was recorded a few years ago from the release and before movements such as Time's Up and Me Too came out. She added: "It was the song that needed to be heard. Because of what I witnessed when I was growing up I always felt really driven to have a voice that my mom kind of never had in my childhood. So I've always wanted to be that advocate for women and anybody that was struggling to have their own voice."

== Critical reception ==
Jon Pareles from The New York Times felt that "Fall in Line" is "addressed directly to 'little girls'", pointing out the lyric "You do not owe them your body and your soul", while Brittany Spanos from Rolling Stone described the track as an "empowering duet". During a review for Liberation for USA Today, Patrick Ryan said that the song is a "soulful riff-off", and Aguilera and Lovato are "belting to the rafters as they preach to young girls the importance of speaking their minds and being themselves". Chuck Arnold from New York Post described the song as "torchy" and "fiery", also stating that "Fall in Line" is "defiant duo". Ilana Kaplan and Joe Goggins from The Independent felt that "Fall in Line" is a standout on Liberation, describing it as a "impassioned feminist anthem", and also stating that Aguilera and Lovato are "two of the best vocal powerhouses in the game".

Daniel Kreps of Rolling Stone called Aguilera and Lovato's singing abilities "remarkable" and deemed the final chorus a "skyscraping duet". Gil Kaufman of Billboard described the track as "a towering empowerment anthem", and Harrison Brocklehurst, writing for The Tab, labelled it as "an epic feminist anthem of stratospheric vocal proportions". Rebecca Farley of Refinery29 described the track as Aguilera's 2002 song "Beautiful"-meets-Lovato's 2017 song "Sorry Not Sorry", calling both singers as "obstreperous pop performers who are done being sorry". The BuzzFeed editor provided a supporting commentary, calling the song "a power anthem".

In July 2018, Cosmopolitan's Eliza Thompson listed "Fall in Line" as one of the "best songs of the year so far". The same magazine later placed the single on its list of the fifty best feminist songs. Billboard's Danielle Pascual ranked the song at number one on the list of the best Demi Lovato collaborations, praising it for "poignant lyrics" and "powerhouse" vocals. The song was nominated for Best Pop Duo/Group Performance at the 61st Annual Grammy Awards, and for the Most Empowering Song of the Year at the 2019 Girls' Choice Awards.

== Commercial performance ==
In the United States, the song entered at number 39 on the Billboard Digital Songs chart with only two days of sales, since the song was released towards the end of the tracking week. The next week, the single ascended to its peak of number 17, becoming her highest-charting song since "Say Something". Thereby, it debuted at number-one on the Bubbling Under the Hot 100 chart, which serves as an extension to the Billboard Hot 100. In Canada, "Fall in Line" reached number 97 on Canadian Hot 100, becoming Aguilera's second lowest charting song. Elsewhere, the track achieved its strongest positions in Hungary, debuting and peaking at number 17 on the Single Top 40 chart, and Guatemala, peaking at the same spot on the Guatemalan Monitor Latino airplay chart. It also achieved top-forty positions on the digital charts of Greece and Spain, reaching number 21 and 37, respectively.

== Music video ==
The accompanying music video was directed by Luke Gilford and premiered May 23, 2018. It depicts Aguilera and Lovato being kidnapped and forced to sing in a futuristic prison filled with surveillance cameras; the two eventually fight their way to freedom. Aguilera stated on Twitter, "'Fall in Line' is as much about supporting each other as it is about self-empowerment. I wanted to convey that in this video by visually representing the imprisonment that so many of us have felt, and the freedom we can achieve together." According to Billboard and Rolling Stone, "The oppressive, male-dominated prison facility is a clear critique on society's oppression of women." The video won a MTV España Award for Video of the Summer.

== Live performances ==
Aguilera made the live performance debut of "Fall in Line" on Carpool Karaoke episode 471, which was first broadcast on May 16, 2018. She performed the song with Lovato at the 2018 Billboard Music Awards four days later. The song was also added to the set list of the European leg of Lovato's Tell Me You Love Me World Tour. On 14 June, Aguilera performed "Think", "Fighter" and "Fall in Line" on The Tonight Show Starring Jimmy Fallon. The next day, she performed "Can't Hold Us Down", "Fall in Line" and "Fighter" on Today Show. Aguilera also performed the song on her residency and tour, Christina Aguilera: The Xperience (2019–2020) and The X Tour (2019), respectively.

== Credits and personnel ==
Credits were adapted from Liberation.

=== Recording and management ===
- Recorded at The Guest House (Hollywood Hills, California)
- Mixed at Larrabee Sound Studios (North Hollywood, California)
- Mastered at The Mastering Palace (New York City)
- Christina Aguilera vocals engineered at The Sanctuary (Los Angeles)
- Published by Xtina Music (BMI), Songs of a Beautiful Mind/Art in the Fodder Music (BMI), WB Music Corp./AMAEB (ASCAP), Mark Oji Music/Songs of Kobalt Music Publishing (BMI), RIC Volta Publishing/Songs of Kobalt Music Publishing (BMI), Johnny Simpson Publishing Degree
- Demi Lovato appears courtesy of Island Records, a division of UMG Recordings, Inc. / Hollywood Records / Safehouse Records LLC
- Jon Bellion appears courtesy of Capitol Records

=== Personnel ===
- Christina Aguilera – vocals, songwriting
- Demi Lovato – vocals
- Jon Bellion – songwriting, production, background vocals
- Audra Mae – songwriting, background vocals, additional vocals
- Mark Williams – songwriting, co-production
- Raul Cubina – songwriting, co-production
- Jonathan "Johnny" Simpson – songwriting, recording, co-production
- Mitch Allan – Demi Lovato vocal production
- Ryan Svendsen – trumpet, flugelhorn
- Oscar Ramirez – Christina Aguilera vocal engineering
- Scott Robinson – additional vocal engineering
- Manny Marroquin – mixing
- Chris Galland – mix engineering
- Robin Florent – mix assistance
- Scott Desmarais – mix assistance
- Dave Kutch – mastering

== Charts ==
"Fall in Line" chart performance
Chart (2018)	Peak position
Belgium (Ultratip Bubbling Under Flanders)	15
Canada Hot 100 (Billboard)	97
Canada Digital Song Sales (Billboard)	29
France (SNEP)	130
Greece Digital Singles (IFPI Greece)	37
Guatemala Anglo (Monitor Latino)	17
Hungary (Single Top 40)	17
Indonesian Digital Songs (LIMA)	1
Portugal (AFP)	69
Scotland Singles (OCC)	56
Spain Digital Singles (PROMUSICAE)	21
Switzerland (Schweizer Hitparade)	86
Taiwan (Hito Radio)	3
UK Download (OCC)	54
UK Singles (OCC)	99
UK Singles Sales (OCC)	55
US Bubbling Under Hot 100 (Billboard)	1
US Digital Song Sales (Billboard)	17
US Pop Digital Song Sales (Billboard)	7

== Release history ==
Region	Date	Format	Label	Ref.
Various	May 16, 2018	Digital download; streaming	RCA	
Italy	May 16, 2018	Contemporary hit radio	Sony	
United States	May 28, 2018	Hot adult contemporary	RCA	
United States	June 19, 2018	Contemporary hit radio	RCA	
