= Your Body (Christina Aguilera song) =

2012 single by Christina Aguilera

Single by Christina Aguilera

from the album Lotus
- Released: September 16, 2012
- Studio: MXM Studios (Stockholm, Sweden); Chalice Recording Studios (Los Angeles, CA)
- Genre: R&B; electro; EDM; pop
- Length: 4:00
- Label: RCA
- Songwriters: Savan Kotecha; Max Martin; Shellback; Tiffany Amber
- Producers: Max Martin; Shellback

Christina Aguilera singles chronology
"Moves like Jagger" (2011)	"Your Body" (2012)	"Just a Fool" (2012)

Music video
- "Your Body" on YouTube

"Your Body" is a song by American singer Christina Aguilera from her seventh studio album, Lotus (2012). Savan Kotecha and Tiffany Amber wrote the song with its producers Max Martin and Shellback. RCA Records premiered the song on On Air with Ryan Seacrest on September 14, 2012, and later sent it to US contemporary hit and rhythmic radio stations two days later as the lead single from Lotus. "Your Body" is an R&B, EDM, and pop number with elements from dubstep and Eurodance. Its lyrics express Aguilera's desire to have sex with an anonymous partner.

"Your Body" received generally positive reviews from music critics, some of them praised Aguilera's vocals while others criticized its lyrical theme and the synthesizers used in the track. The single achieved moderate success on the charts. Internationally, "Your Body" reached number one in Belarus and the Top-10 in Canada and Lebanon while reaching Top-20 in the UK, Scotland and Japan, and Top-40 in most other countries, including Germany, Denmark, New Zealand, Spain, Switzerland, Hungary, Romania and the United States, where it peaked at number 34 on the Billboard Hot 100 with first-week sales of 103,000 copies, as well as debuting at number 10 on the Billboard Digital Songs chart and topping the Dance Club Songs chart.

An accompanying music video for "Your Body" was released on September 28, 2012. Directed by Melina Matsoukas and shot in Los Angeles, California, the video portrays Aguilera as a woman who kills men after seducing them. It was met with generally positive reviews from critics, who deemed it one of Aguilera's best music videos. On November 2, 2012, Aguilera performed "Your Body" on the Late Night with Jimmy Fallon with Jimmy Fallon and The Roots. The song was later included in the setlist for Aguilera's Vegas residency Christina Aguilera: The Xperience.

== Background ==
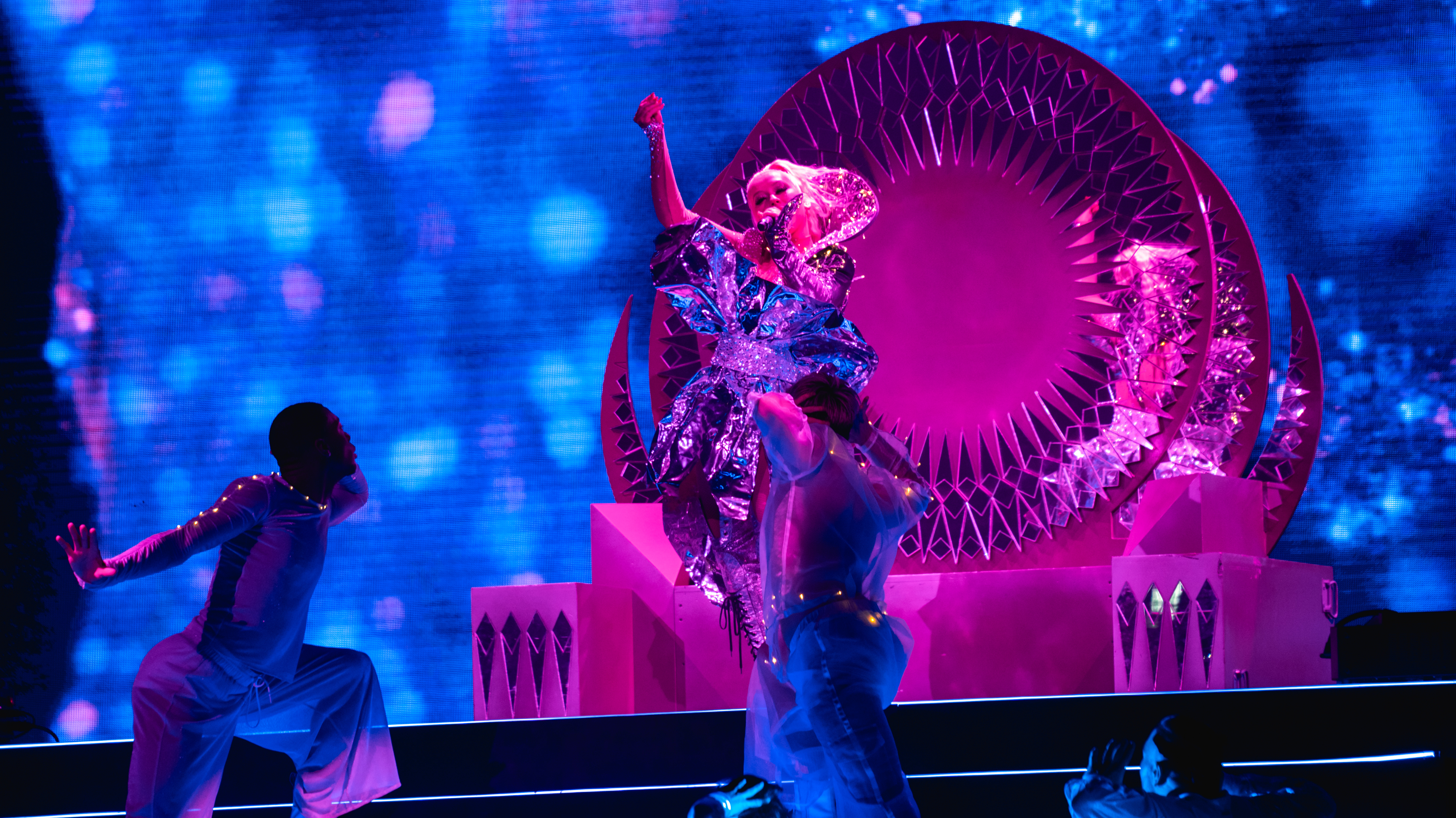
Aguilera performs the song during The X Tour at Wembley Arena (2019)

In December 2011, it was announced that Aguilera was teaming up with Swedish hit producer Max Martin on her comeback single for her then upcoming album. On July 3, 2012, Billboard reported that the "club banger" would be officially produced by Martin. Writing for the same publication, Andrew Hampp thought that their collaboration was very "surprising" because Martin had been working with a lot of artists, including Backstreet Boys, *NSYNC, and Britney Spears; however, "Your Body" was the first song Martin wrote for Aguilera, as Aguilera had previously wanted to differentiate herself from the aforementioned acts. During an interview with the magazine, she commented on the Swedish producer, saying "Max is legendary in the business. He's known about me but we haven't crossed paths... It's taken us a decade in the same business and watching each other from a distance, so for us to now come together and respect each other's work ethic and how we like to be heard and making a marriage out of it, I think "Your Body" is the best culmination of that".

== Release and artwork ==
Before its official release, an uncensored demo version of "Your Body" was leaked to the web on August 23, 2012, entitled "Fuck Your Body", where she sings "All I wanna do is fuck your body" in the chorus. On September 12, 2012, Aguilera revealed details about Lotus and "Your Body" via Twitter, including the cover artwork. RCA Records premiered the song on On Air with Ryan Seacrest on September 14, 2012. Two days later, the single was serviced to contemporary hit rhythmic radio stations in the United States. "Your Body" was available via iTunes Stores worldwide for digital download on September 17, 2012. It was also digitally release in the United Kingdom on November 2, 2012; three remixes of the track was purchased for online sales the same day. The CD single version for "Your Body" was released in Germany and the United States on November 9 and November 27, respectively.

The single's cover artwork sees Aguilera "nearly" naked, wrapping in a "sheer blush-colored" piece of fabric and barely covering her breasts with her long flowing hair, while her arms are outstretched over her head. It also features Aguilera's "all curves"; TJ from Neon Limelight called the cover "sizzling" and wrote that it features her "bodacious curves on full display". Rebecca Macatee of E! Online labelled the artwork "an R-rated recreation" of "Genie in a Bottle". MTV Buzzworthy's Byron Flitsch praised the cover, calling it "a stunning cover art that has rendered us totally speechless". Fuse's Nicole James and Andrew Stout from SF Weekly compared Aguilera's image on the artwork to that of Marilyn Monroe in the photo shoot The Last Sitting.

== Composition and lyrical interpretation ==
"Your Body" (2012)
A 21-second sample of "Your Body", a midtempo electro, pop, EDM and R&B song which features elements from dubstep and Eurodance.

"Your Body" is a midtempo R&B, electro, EDM and pop number with dance-pop production, a Eurodance beat and dubstep influences in its middle eight. The song features heavy synthesizers, "stuttering" drums, and "hard-hitting" beats. According to Gregory Hicks from The Michigan Daily, "Your Body" is musically similar to Jessie J's 2011 song "Abracadabra". Chris Martins from Spin commented that the song "has a mellow thrust that hits muted transcendence for the chorus before dipping back down into that bummer bump". The chorus and the bridge features Aguilera's "powerful" vocals, provided by heavy synthesizers over a "booming" Eurodance beat. Entertainment Weekly reviewer Melissa Maerz noted that Aguilera's vocals are provided by too much synthesizers. Gregory Hicks of The Michigan Daily compared her "synthesized" voice on the song to those in Maroon 5's "One More Night", which was also produced by Martin.

In "Your Body", Aguilera sings of having a one-night stand with a random man. In the first verse, she "angrily" purrs, "So open the box, don't need no key, I'm unlocked". Synthesizers and "stuttering" drums are featured at the pre-chorus, "Don't even tell me your name/ All I need to know is whose place/ And let's get walking". Chris Martins of Spin commented that the lyrics actually means, "The economy is in the tank, congress can't agree on anything, war and natural disasters consume us ... so, what else can we do but make love?" At the second verse, she tells her lover, "I am a freak, I'm disturbed/ So come on and give me your worst/ We're moving faster than slow/ If you don't know where to go/ I'll finish off on my own". The four-on-the-floor refrain has Aguilera "flaunting her famous pipes" on the chorus, "All I wanna do is love your body/ Tonight's your lucky night, I know you want it". In a track-by-track review for Lotus, Billboard critic Andrew Hampp thought that the song "doesn't peak" until Aguilera "growls", "I think you already know my name" at the bridge. According to Jason Lipshutz from Billboard and Robert Cospey of Digital Spy, the lyrics of "Your Body" are similar to Aguilera's previous single "Dirrty" (2002).

== Reception ==
=== Critical reception ===
"Your Body" garnered generally positive reviews from music critics. In a positive feedback, a reviewer from Billboard wrote that "it's clear the diva is going for broke". Writing for Digital Spy, Robert Cospey scored the single a four stars out of five rating and labelled it one of Aguilera's best tracks. Jon Caramanica from The New York Times picked the song as one of the stand-out songs from Lotus that highlighted Aguilera's "volcanic" vocals, naming it "sweaty and bold". Mikeal Wood from the Los Angeles Times praised "Your Body"'s musical diversity from her previous 2010 record Bionic and complimented Aguilera's "powerhouse" vocals on the track. Sarah Deen for Metro praised the single as "a funky, thumping dance number that is one for the girls to dance around their handbags to". Writing for The Guardian, Issy Sampson praised the song for being "everything you want from [Aguilera]: loud yelling, lyrics about crap one-night stands and a slutty video." The PopCrush critic Amy Sciarretto opined that "the song is as slick as it is sultry". She also labelled "Your Body" as a "club banger", cheered Aguilera's vocal ability and considered the lyrics "sexy". In a review for Album Confessions Aguilera's "powerhouse vocals" were praised, and the song itself has been called "a full-fledge, dance floor ready, sweat-pouring pop song that should get everybody in the clubs on the feet". Alexis L. Loinaz from E! Online also provided a positive review, stating that the song "promises to be a major dance-floor stomper, laying on the synths atop a thumping bass line as the power belter's potent vocals pile on the decibels".

In a mixed review, Melissa Maerz from Entertainment Weekly praised Aguilera's vocals, which "reaches high enough to dust the angels with bronzer". However, Maerz criticized the overused synthesizers in the track, commenting that "she could be anyone". Rolling Stone critic Jody Rosen wrote "You can measure a singer's place in the pop-star pecking order by the quality of the Max Martin/Shellback song she releases. For Xtina, the news ain't good." Gregory Hicks for The Michigan Daily criticized that the song's lyrics "aren't even worth a discussion"; he also criticized the synthesizers used in the song and commented that "even Aguilera's flop Bionic had more musical complexity".

=== Retrospective reception ===
In a retrospective review, Mike Nied of Idolator called the song a "glorious pop anthem". He noted that, "After a rough album rollout and cancelled tour in 2010 [...] Xtina went for the safe bet by teaming up with prolific hitmaker Max Martin". He went on to say that "although the track received positive reviews from fans, it fizzled on the charts" due to lack of promotion. Joshua Haigh of Attitude praised the song for its bridge and a "strong central message about the joys of meaningless sex". He hailed "Your Body" as one of ten most underrated singles from the '10s. That Grape Juice opined that "Your Body" was "rightfully serviced as the album’s lead single", and noted: "This blaring ball of brilliance is Christina at her melismatic best". Both Orlaith Condon from Ticketmaster and Idolator's Mike Wass ranked "Your Body" among the ten best songs recorded by Aguilera. Writing for The Celebrity Cafe, Christopher Rosa placed the single on his list of Aguilera's best songs ever, at number seven, and noted: "The synthy enhancements in this track make Aguilera sound like a temptress while still staying true to her multiple-octave range".

== Commercial performance ==
"Your Body" was a moderate success. It debuted and peaked at number 34 on the Billboard Hot 100 on the chart issue dated October 6, 2012, with 103,000 digital copies sold. The song debuted at number 10 on the Hot Digital Songs, becoming Aguilera's first top 10 song on the chart as the lead artist since "Keeps Gettin' Better" peaked at number 5 in 2008. On the US Pop Songs chart, the track debuted at number 33 on September 29, 2012, and later reached its peak at number 20. "Your Body" was commercially successful on the Dance Club Songs, reaching # 1 on the chart on December 8, 2012. The single also peaked at number 10 on the Canadian Hot 100 on November 24, 2012. For the issue chart dated November 17, 2012, the single debuted and peaked at number 16 on the UK Singles Chart, and only remained in the top 75 of the chart for two weeks, dropping to number 31 in its second week and then to number 91 in its third week.

"Your Body" reached the top 40 charts of most European countries where it charted. It peaked at number 16 in Scotland, number 17 in Sweden, number 21 in Finland, number 22 in Switzerland and Spain, number 23 in Hungary, number 29 in Germany, and number 35 in Denmark. On The Official Lebanese Top 20 chart, the single was more successful, peaking at number six. It achieved similar success in South Korea, where it charted at number six on the Gaon International Download Chart.

== Music video ==
=== Background and concept ===
Aguilera blowing up a car, where her one-night stand lover is inside. In the back, it is seen electric-pink flames.

The music video for the song directed by Melina Matsoukas was filmed between August 20 and 21, 2012, in Los Angeles. A cut from the video premiered on NBC's The Voice on September 17. A video teaser was released on Aguilera's YouTube channel on September 17, 2012. The official music video premiered on Vevo on September 28, 2012. Aguilera commented about the collaboration with Matsoukas, "Once we started talking with each other and she heard 'Your Body,' she spun it in a way that you wouldn't expect at all. And I get to play this character that, yeah, she may be a little bit of a badass, she's very confident, self-assured, but she's super playful and super tongue-in-cheek. She laughs the whole way through the video. She's watching cartoons, and you know she doesn't take herself too seriously."

The video begins with a warning saying "no men were harmed in the making of this video". In the opening, it shows Aguilera playing 1980s computer games on her computer when she gets an incoming message from an occult fortune teller. Opening the message, she asks "Hey Oranum, what's my week look like?" to which the occult fortune teller responds "You're gonna have a killer week!". Aguilera smirks to the camera and images are shown of Aguilera writhing around seductively on a bed and eating cereal whilst on the couch watching cartoons. In the clip, Aguilera plays a killer who kills men after seducing them. She goes on a ride with the first man and seduces him leading to a make-out session between the two, then after he falls asleep, she blows up his car in electric-pink flames. Next, she goes to a bar and seduces the second man in a bathroom stall, where she bludgeons him to death, leaving spatters of blue paint dripping from the walls. Finally, she seduces a third unlucky suitor (who was foretold by the same occult fortune teller that it was his unlucky day) by inviting him to a motel and then uses a baseball bat to kill him, "showering the room in a mist of red confetti". The video ends with Aguilera washing off the red confetti splashed all over herself while looking in the mirror at her reflection and as the confetti goes down the drain, shows Aguilera in her trailer eating cereal while changing channels on her television set, settling on "The Lucy Show" before smiling and turning off her television. The video features several cultural influences, including the NES Advantage video game controller, the psychic site Oranum.com, and clips of The Lucy Show featuring actress Lucille Ball.

=== Reception ===
The video received positive reviews from media outlets. James Montgomery from MTV News commented that the video is "grisly and garish, but also incredibly clever and visually arresting". T. Kyle writing for MTV Buzzworthy gave the video a positive feedback, writing "Christina manages to be fun and provocative, the styling is beautiful and even aspirational, and Legendtina's body looks amazing". Sam Lansky from Idolator website complimented Aguilera's "charming sense of humor" and deemed "Your Body" as one of Aguilera's best music videos. Writing for Billboard, Jason Lipshut noted the video seemed to be inspired by the unending stream of violence on TV, but felt that Aguilera's clothing style in the video was the standout part. In a review of the video for Yahoo! Music, Lyndsey Park complimented the cultural references in the video, writing that "it's enough to make even Seth MacFarlane or Dennis Miller's heads spin. And yet, somehow, it's all so very, very Xtina". Marc Hogan of Spin wrote that "It might take us a few more viewings to get the joke, but at least there's enough amazing absurdity going on to make that prospect sound entertaining". On December 4, 2012, Fuse announced that "Your Body" was the number one video of 2012, based on online voting.

== Live performances ==
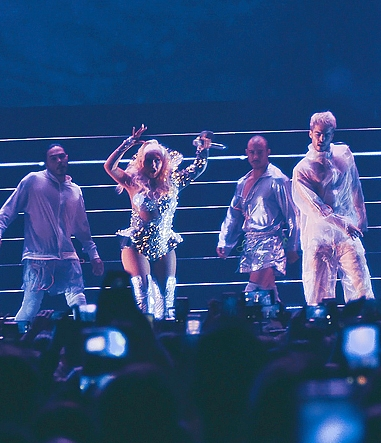
Aguilera performs "Your Body" during The X Tour — Saint Petersburg, July 2019

On November 2, 2012, Aguilera performed "Your Body" on the Late Night with Jimmy Fallon with Jimmy Fallon and The Roots, using office supplies as instruments including an iPhone and a stapler. The song was later included in the setlist for Aguilera's Vegas residency Christina Aguilera: The Xperience (2019–2020), as well as her European/Mexican leg The X Tour (2020). In June 2023, Aguilera closed the NYC Pride concert and performed a number of her songs, including "Your Body" and another Lotus track, "Let There Be Love".

In September 2023, Aguilera performed at the EuroPride concert in Malta, in front of an audience of 38,000 people. She opened the show with a remix version of "Your Body". The singer included the song in the set list for her second concert residency Christina Aguilera at Voltaire (2023–2024), which took place at The Venetian Las Vegas.

== Accolades ==
Year	Ceremony	Category	Result	Ref.
2012	Fuse Awards	Best Video of the Year	Won	
2012	PopCrush Awards	Video of the Year	Nominated	
2013	Capital FM's Music Video Awards	Best Music Video Kiss Scene	Nominated	
2013	Spetteguless Awards	Best Pop Song	Nominated	
2013	Spetteguless Awards	Best Video of the Year	3rd place	
2014	World Music Awards	Best Song	Nominated	
2014	World Music Awards	Best Video	Nominated	
2014	Vevo Certified Awards	100,000,000 Views	Won	

== Credits and personnel ==
- Vocals: Christina Aguilera
- Songwriting: Savan Kotecha, Max Martin, Shellback, Tiffany Amber
- Production: Max Martin, Shellback

Credits adapted from the liner notes of Lotus, RCA Records.

== Track listings ==
- CD single and digital download
1. "Your Body" – 4:00
- Digital download – Remixes EP
1. "Your Body" – 4:00
2. "Your Body" (Ken Loi Remix) – 5:26
3. "Your Body" (Audien Remix) – 6:16
4. "Your Body" (Oxford Hustlers Radio Mix) – 3:42

== Charts and certifications ==
=== Weekly charts ===
Chart (2012–2013)	Peak position
Australia (ARIA)	59
Austria (Ö3 Austria Top 40)	19
Belarus (Unistar Top 20)	1
Belgium (Ultratop 50 Flanders)	44
Belgium (Ultratip Bubbling Under Wallonia)	13
Brazil (Billboard Brasil Hot 100)	54
Brazil Hot Pop Songs	17
Canada Hot 100 (Billboard)	10
Canada CHR/Top 40 (Billboard)	15
Canada Hot AC (Billboard)	10
CIS Airplay (TopHit)	77
Czech Republic Airplay (ČNS IFPI)	47
Denmark (Tracklisten)	35
Finland (The Official Finnish Download Chart)	21
Finland Airplay (Suomen virallinen lista)	20
France (SNEP)	84
Germany (GfK)	29
Global Dance Tracks (Billboard)	13
Honduras (Honduras Top 50)	27
Hungary (Rádiós Top 40)	23
Ireland (IRMA)	46
Israel (Media Forest International Airplay)	7
Italy (FIMI)	27
Japan (Japan Hot 100)	17
Japan Adult Contemporary Airplay (Billboard)	1
Japan Radio Songs (Billboard)	7
Latvia (Latvijas Top 50)	30
Lebanon (The Official Lebanese Top 20)	6
Netherlands (Dutch Top 40 Tipparade)	2
Netherlands (Single Top 100)	65
New Zealand (Recorded Music NZ)	33
Romania (Romania TV Airplay)	6
Romania (Romanian Top 100)	37
Russia Airplay (TopHit)	95
Scottish Singles Sales (Official Charts)	16
Slovakia Airplay (ČNS IFPI)	27
South Korea International Downloads (Gaon)	6
Spain (Promusicae)	22
Sweden (DigiListan)	17
Switzerland (Schweizer Hitparade)	22
Switzerland (Media Control Romandy)	20
Ukraine Airplay (TopHit)	53
UK Singles (Official Charts)	16
US Billboard Hot 100	34
US Pop Airplay (Billboard)	20
US Dance Club Songs (Billboard)	1
US Digital Songs (Billboard)	10

=== Certifications ===
Region	Certification	Certified units/sales
New Zealand (RMNZ)	Gold	7,500^{*}
Streaming
Denmark (IFPI Danmark)	Gold	900,000^{†}
^{*} Sales figures based on certification alone.^{†} Streaming-only figures based on certification alone.

== Release history ==
Region	Date	Format	Label
United States	September 16, 2012	Contemporary hit and rhythmic radio	RCA
Australia	September 17, 2012	Digital download	RCA
Brazil	September 17, 2012	Digital download	RCA
Canada	September 17, 2012	Digital download	RCA
Denmark	September 17, 2012	Digital download	RCA
France	September 17, 2012	Digital download	RCA
Ireland	September 17, 2012	Digital download	RCA
Italy	September 17, 2012	Digital download	RCA
New Zealand	September 17, 2012	Digital download	RCA
Norway	September 17, 2012	Digital download	RCA
Portugal	September 17, 2012	Digital download	RCA
Spain	September 17, 2012	Digital download	RCA
United Kingdom	November 4, 2012	Digital download	RCA
Germany	November 9, 2012	CD single	RCA
United States	November 27, 2012	CD single	RCA

== See also ==
- List of number-one dance singles of 2012 (U.S.)
