= Christina Aguilera videography =

Videos and media by American singer

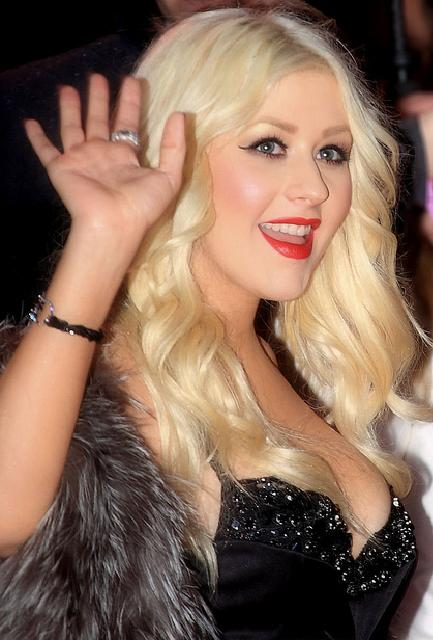
Aguilera at the premiere of Burlesque at the Empire, Leicester Square in London in 2010

American singer Christina Aguilera has released five video albums and been featured in fifty-eight music videos, five films, thirteen television programs, and seven commercials. Aguilera achieved early fame in 1993 and 1994 when she appeared in the Disney Channel television series The New Mickey Mouse Club, which co-starred her contemporaries Britney Spears, Justin Timberlake, and Ryan Gosling. In 1999, she rose to prominence with her eponymous debut album, whose singles "Genie in a Bottle", "What a Girl Wants", "I Turn to You" and "Come On Over Baby (All I Want Is You)" all received their music videos. The videos for the Spanish versions of the four singles were subsequently released in conjunction with the promotion of Aguilera's 2000 Spanish album Mi Reflejo. In 2001, Aguilera appeared in the music video for "Lady Marmalade", a collaboration with Mýa, Lil' Kim, and Pink, which earned two MTV Video Music Awards for Video of the Year and Best Video from a Film at the 2001 ceremony.

Aguilera generated much attention in mid-2002 following the release of the music video for "Dirrty"–her fourth studio album Stripped's lead single, which was found controversial owing to the depiction of overtly sexual activities. However, she later received praise in late 2002 for the visual for Stripped's second single "Beautiful", which received a GLAAD Media Award for its positive portrayal of gay people and "message about self-respect and empowerment." In 2004, Aguilera made an appearance on Nelly's video "Tilt Ya Head Back", which was noted for her imitation of Marilyn Monroe. In 2006, Aguilera released her fifth studio album Back to Basics; three music videos for the singles "Ain't No Other Man", "Hurt" and "Candyman" from the album were shot. The lead single's video was directed by Bryan Barber and was highlighted for portraying Aguilera's then newly established alter ego Baby Jane. Aguilera's 2010 studio album Bionic was promoted by the video releases of "Not Myself Tonight" and "You Lost Me", and her 2012 studio album Lotus received its promotion from the video for "Your Body".

In addition to her music videos, Aguilera has released five video albums. Four DVDs Genie Gets Her Wish, My Reflection, Stripped Live in the U.K., and Back to Basics: Live and Down Under were filmed in accompaniment with Aguilera's concert tours Christina Aguilera in Concert (2000), The Stripped Tour (2003), and Back to Basics Tour (2006–2008). Meanwhile, the other video album Back to Basics and Beyond was released exclusively in North America in 2006 in conjunction with the promotion of the album Back to Basics. Aguilera's first film appearance was in Shark Tale (2004), in which she voiced a Rastafarian jellyfish and for whose soundtrack she recorded a song titled "Car Wash" with Missy Elliott. She subsequently starred in the 2010 film Burlesque as Ali Rose, a dancer in a burlesque club. The film received lukewarm critical reception and garnered over US$90.5 million. She has additionally appeared in several television shows, including the reality television series The Voice, of which six out of ten seasons saw her contribution as a coach and judge.

== Music videos ==
=== 1990s and 2000s ===
Key
•	Denotes music videos directed or co-directed by Christina Aguilera

Year	Title	Other performer(s)	Director(s)	Associated album	Notes	Ref.
1998	"Reflection"	—N/a	Tony Bancroft	Mulan: An Original Walt Disney Records Soundtrack and Christina Aguilera		
1999	"Genie in a Bottle"	—N/a	Diane Martel	Christina Aguilera		
1999	"What a Girl Wants"	—N/a	Diane Martel	Christina Aguilera		
1999	"The Christmas Song"	—N/a	Doug Biro; Clare Davies	My Kind of Christmas		
2000	"I Turn to You"	—N/a	Rupert C. Almont	Christina Aguilera		
2000	"Come On Over Baby (All I Want Is You)"	—N/a	Paul Hunter	Christina Aguilera		
2000	"So Emotional"	—N/a	Claire Grace Davies	Christina Aguilera	Featured on the video album Genie Gets Her Wish (2000).	
2000	"When You Put Your Hands on Me"	—N/a	Claire Grace Davies	Christina Aguilera	Featured on the video album Genie Gets Her Wish (2000).	
2000	"Genio Atrapado" (Note: "Genio Atrapado" is the Spanish-language version of "Genie in a Bottle".)	—N/a	Diane Martel	Mi Reflejo		
2000	"Por Siempre Tú" (Note: "Por Siempre Tú" is the Spanish-language version of "I Turn to You".)	—N/a	Rupert C. Almont	Mi Reflejo		
2000	"Ven Conmigo (Solamente Tú)" (Note: "Ven Conmigo (Solamente Tú)" is the Spanish-language version of "Come On Over Baby (All I Want Is You)".)	—N/a	Paul Hunter; Lorin Finkelstein	Mi Reflejo		
2000	"Pero Me Acuerdo de Ti"	—N/a	Kevin G. Bray	Mi Reflejo		
2000	"Christmas Time"	—N/a	Lawrence Jordan	My Kind of Christmas		
2001	"Nobody Wants to Be Lonely"	Ricky Martin	Wayne Isham	Sound Loaded		
2001	"Lady Marmalade"	Mýa; Lil' Kim; Pink; Missy Elliott	Paul Hunter	Moulin Rouge! Music from Baz Luhrmann's Film		
2001	"El Último Adiós (The Last Goodbye)"	Various artists	Emilio Estefan	—N/a		
2001	"What's Going On"	Artists Against AIDS Worldwide	Jake Scott	—N/a		
2002	"Dirrty"	Redman	David LaChapelle	Stripped		
2002	"Beautiful"	—N/a	Jonas Åkerlund	Stripped		
2003	"Fighter"	—N/a	Floria Sigismondi	Stripped		
2003	"Can't Hold Us Down"	Lil' Kim	David LaChapelle	Stripped		
2003	"The Voice Within"	—N/a	David LaChapelle	Stripped		
2004	"Car Wash"	Missy Elliott	DreamWorks Animation	Shark Tale: Motion Picture Soundtrack		
2004	"Tilt Ya Head Back"	Nelly	Little X	Sweat		
2006	"Ain't No Other Man"	—N/a	Bryan Barber	Back to Basics		
2006	"Hurt" •	—N/a	Floria Sigismondi; Christina Aguilera	Back to Basics		
2006	"Tell Me"	P. Diddy	Erik White	Press Play		
2007	"Candyman" •	—N/a	Matthew Rolston; Christina Aguilera	Back to Basics		
2007	"Oh Mother" •	—N/a	Christina Aguilera; Hamish Hamilton	Back to Basics	Live performance from the Back to Basics Tour in Adelaide, Australia in July 2007. Featured on Back to Basics: Live and Down Under (2008).	
2008	"Save Me from Myself"	—N/a	Paul Korver	Back to Basics	Features personal footage of Aguilera's 2005 wedding to former husband, Jordan Bratman. It was released in celebration of the birth of their son, Max, in January 2008.	
2008	"Keeps Gettin' Better"	—N/a	Peter Berg	Keeps Gettin' Better: A Decade of Hits		

=== 2010s ===
Key
•	Denotes music videos directed or co-directed by Christina Aguilera

Year	Title	Other performer(s)	Director(s)	Associated album	Notes	Ref.
2010	"Not Myself Tonight"	—N/a	Hype Williams	Bionic		
2010	"You Lost Me"	—N/a	Anthony Mandler	Bionic		
2011	"Moves like Jagger"	Maroon 5	Jonas Åkerlund	Hands All Over		
2012	"Your Body"	—N/a	Melina Matsoukas	Lotus		
2013	"Feel This Moment"	Pitbull	David Rousseau	Global Warming		
2013	"Hoy Tengo Ganas de Ti"	Alejandro Fernández	Simon Brand	Confidencias		
2013	"Let There Be Love" •	—N/a	Christina Aguilera	Lotus		
2013	"Say Something"	A Great Big World	Christopher Sims	Is There Anybody Out There?		
2016	"Change" •	—N/a	Christina Aguilera	—N/a	A lyric video for the song. Features images and a video of Aguilera as a child, as well as a video of a grown up, red-haired singer, chanting the subject.	
2016	"Telepathy"	—N/a	Hannah Lux Davis	The Get Down (Original Soundtrack from the Netflix Original Series)	A short disco-themed music video. Released to thank fans for making the song reach number one on the Billboard US Dance Club Songs chart.	
2018	"Accelerate"	—N/a	Zoey Grossman	Liberation		
2018	"Twice" •	—N/a	Christina Aguilera	Liberation	A conceptual visual video created by Aguilera and her team. Features Aguilera in the water scenery.	
2018	"Fall in Line"	Demi Lovato	Luke Gilford	Liberation		
2018	"Wonderland"	—N/a	Unknown	—N/a	A short visual video shared by Aguilera on social media. Described by the Idolator as a "sexy spin on the Alice in Wonderland tale". The song was never released in its full studio version.	
2019	"Haunted Heart"	—N/a	Unknown	The Addams Family	A lyric video featuring Aguilera singing in the recording studio. Also includes scenes from the 2019 animated film The Addams Family.	

=== 2020s ===
Key
•	Denotes music videos directed or co-directed by Christina Aguilera

Year	Title	Other performer(s)	Director(s)	Associated album	Notes	Ref.
2020	"Fall on Me"	A Great Big World	Se Oh	Particles		
2020	"Loyal Brave True"	—N/a	Niki Caro	Mulan (Original Motion Picture Soundtrack)		
2020	"El Mejor Guerrero" (Note: "El Mejor Guerrero" is the Spanish-language version of "Loyal Brave True".)	—N/a	Niki Caro	Mulan (Original Motion Picture Soundtrack)		
2020	"Reflection" (2020)	—N/a	Niki Caro	Mulan (Original Motion Picture Soundtrack)		
2021	"Pa Mis Muchachas"	Becky G Nicki Nicole; Nathy Peluso	Alexandre Moors	Aguilera		
2021	"Somos Nada"	—N/a	Alexandre Moors	Aguilera		
2022	"Santo"	Ozuna	Nuno Gomes	Aguilera		
2022	"Santo" (Alternative Version)	Ozuna	Nuno Gomes	Aguilera		
2022	"La Reina"	—N/a	Nuno Gomes	Aguilera		
2022	"Suéltame"	Tini	Ana Lily Amirpour	Aguilera		
2022	"No Es Que Te Extrañe" •	—N/a	Mike Ho; Christina Aguilera	Aguilera		
2022	"Beautiful" (2022 version)	—N/a	Fiona Jane Burgess	Stripped	Released in celebration of the 20-year anniversary of Stripped's release.	
—N/a	"Cuando Me Dé la Gana"	Christian Nodal	Unknown	Aguilera	Teased by Aguilera in late 2022, the video is currently unreleased.	

=== Guest appearances ===
Year	Title	Performer(s)	Director(s)	Associated album	Notes	Ref.
2025	"SexOnTheBeat"	Adéla	91 Rules	The Provocateur	Cameo appearance	

== Video albums ==
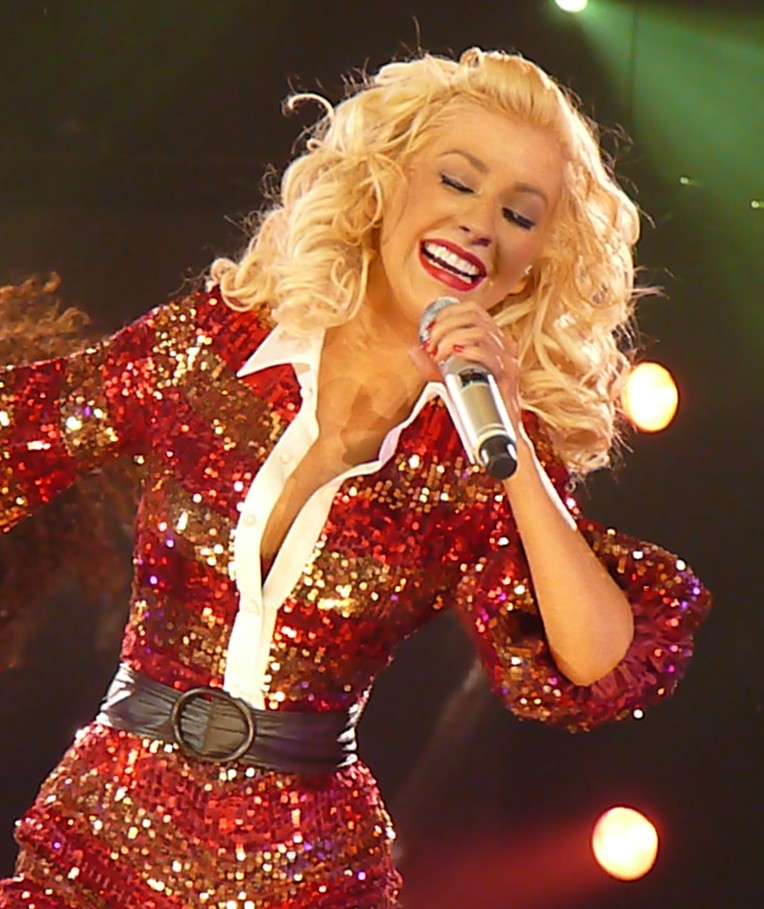
Aguilera performing on her Back to Basics Tour in 2006

Title	Details	Ref.
Genie Gets Her Wish	Released: December 14, 1999; Format: DVD, VHS, CD (Note: The video was also released as a CD alongside Stripped Live in the U.K. in Germany on March 26, 2010.); Label: RCA	
My Reflection	Released: June 5, 2001; Format: DVD, VHS; Label: RCA	
Stripped Live in the U.K.	Released: November 15, 2004; Format: DVD, CD (Note: The video was also released as a CD alongside Stripped in the US on December 8, 2008.); Label: RCA	
Back to Basics and Beyond	Released: 2006 (Note: The album was released exclusively in Canada and the United States by Walmart.); Format: NTSC; Label: RCA	
Back to Basics: Live and Down Under	Released: February 4, 2008; Format: DVD, digital download; Label: RCA	

== Filmography ==
Year	Title	Role	Notes	Ref.
2004	Shark Tale	Rastafarian jellyfish	Voice role	
2008	Shine a Light	Herself	Documentary film	
2010	Get Him to the Greek	Herself	Cameo	
2010	Burlesque	Alice Marilyn "Ali" Rose	Lead role Nominations: ALMA Award for Favorite Film Leading Actress – Comedy or Musical; MTV Movie Award for Best Female Breakout Star	
2012	Casa de mi Padre	Singing lips	Cameo (uncredited); The opening scene features the lips of Aguilera who sings the eponymous song	
2015	Pitch Perfect 2	Herself	Cameo	
2017	The Emoji Movie	Akiko Glitter	Voice role	
2018	Zoe	Jewels	Supporting role	
2018	Life of the Party	Herself	Cameo	
2025	Christina Aguilera: Christmas in Paris	Herself	Concert film	

== Television ==
Year(s)	Title	Role	Notes	Ref.
1990	Star Search	Contestant	Season 6	
1993–1994	The All-New Mickey Mouse Club	Herself	Season 6–7	
1999	Beverly Hills, 90210	Herself	Season 10, episode 2: "Let's Eat Cake"	
1999	Roswell	Herself	Season 1, episode 3: "Monsters"	
1999	Christmas in Washington	Herself	Guest star	
2000	Al Salir de Clase	Herself	Season 5, episode 42: "El día que no existe" Season 8, episode 72: "Augurios"	
2002	Un Paso Adelante	Herself	Season 1, episode 1: "Arriba el telón"	
2003	Player$	Herself	Season 2, episode 10: "Hulk"	
2003	Punk'd	Herself	Season 1, episode 1: "Ryan Pinkston – VH1 Big in 2002"	
2006	Rock Legends: Platinum Weird	Herself	Television film	
2009	Project Runway	Guest judge	Season 6, episode 9: "Sequins, Feathers and Fur, Oh My!"	
2010	Conan	Herself	Season 1, episode 9: "A Prayer for Dick Butkus"	
2010	Entourage	Herself	Season 7, episode 10: "Lose Yourself"	
2011–2016	The Voice	Coach	Seasons 1, 2, 3, 5, 8, and 10	
2015	Nashville	Jade St. John	Recurring role Season 3, episodes 18–21	
2018	RuPaul's Drag Race	Guest Judge	Season 10, episode 1: "10s Across the Board"	
2020	The Disney Family Singalong	Herself	Television special. Volumes I and II.	
2020	Yearly Departed	Herself	Amazon Prime Video's comedy special (musical guest)	
2021	Demi Lovato: Dancing with the Devil	Herself	YouTube documentary series. Episode 4: "Rebirthing"	

== Commercials ==
Year	Product / Brand	Ref.
2001	Coca-Cola	
2003	Skechers	
2006	Pepsi	
2007	Simply Christina Aguilera	
2008	Stephen Webster – Shattered Jewelry Collection	
2009	Christina Aguilera by Night	
2012	Red Sin	
2012	Royal Desire	
2013	Unforgettable	
2017	Oreo	

== Bibliography ==
- Dominguez, Pier (2003). Christina Aguilera – A Star Is Made: The Unauthorized Biography. Amber Communications Group, Inc. ISBN 978-0-9702224-5-9.
- Railton, Diane; Watson, Paul (2011). Music Video and the Politics of Representation. Edinburgh University Press. ISBN 978-0-7486-3323-4.
- Terrace, Vincent (2013). Television Specials: 5,336 Entertainment Programs, 1936–2012. McFarland. ISBN 978-0786474448.
