= Cultural impact of Christina Aguilera =

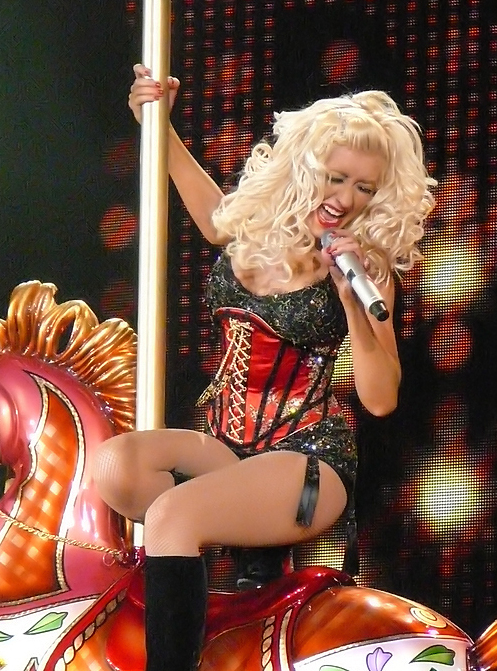
Aguilera performing her controversial song "Dirrty" on the Back to Basics Tour in 2007

Throughout her career, American singer Christina Aguilera has received extensive recognition as a cultural figure, gaining recognition for her impact on popular culture and the music industry. Considered one of the greatest vocalists in pop music, Aguilera's has received numerous honorifics and recognition.

Since her debut in the late 1990s, Aguilera has been significant figure in helping reshape the "Latin explosion" in the late 1990s and contributed to the Latin pop boom in American music. She has released two Spanish-language albums including Mi Reflejo (2000) and Aguilera (2022) which have been credited for helping expand Spanish language music within the US and also won two Latin Grammy Awards. She has also become known for addressing controversial themes in her music including feminism, sexuality and domestic violence. She has used her platform to challenge societal norms and her songs "Dirrty" and "Beautiful" have sparked public discussions and helped shift the narrative for women in pop music and LGBTQ+ culture respectively. Aguilera's music videos have also played a significant role in shaping pop culture and the subsequent impact of her videography has also been analyzed by music critics.

Being one of the best-selling artists of all time, she has garnered commercial success through Billboard charts and other achievements. She has since earned the title of being the "Voice of a Generation", with various journalists often acknowledging her contributions to shaping the entertainment industry. Her work has also inspired and influence numerous artists and acts in music industries worldwide. Her album Stripped (2002) has also been credited with inspiring younger pop stars to embrace their own transformations.

== Fame and stardom ==
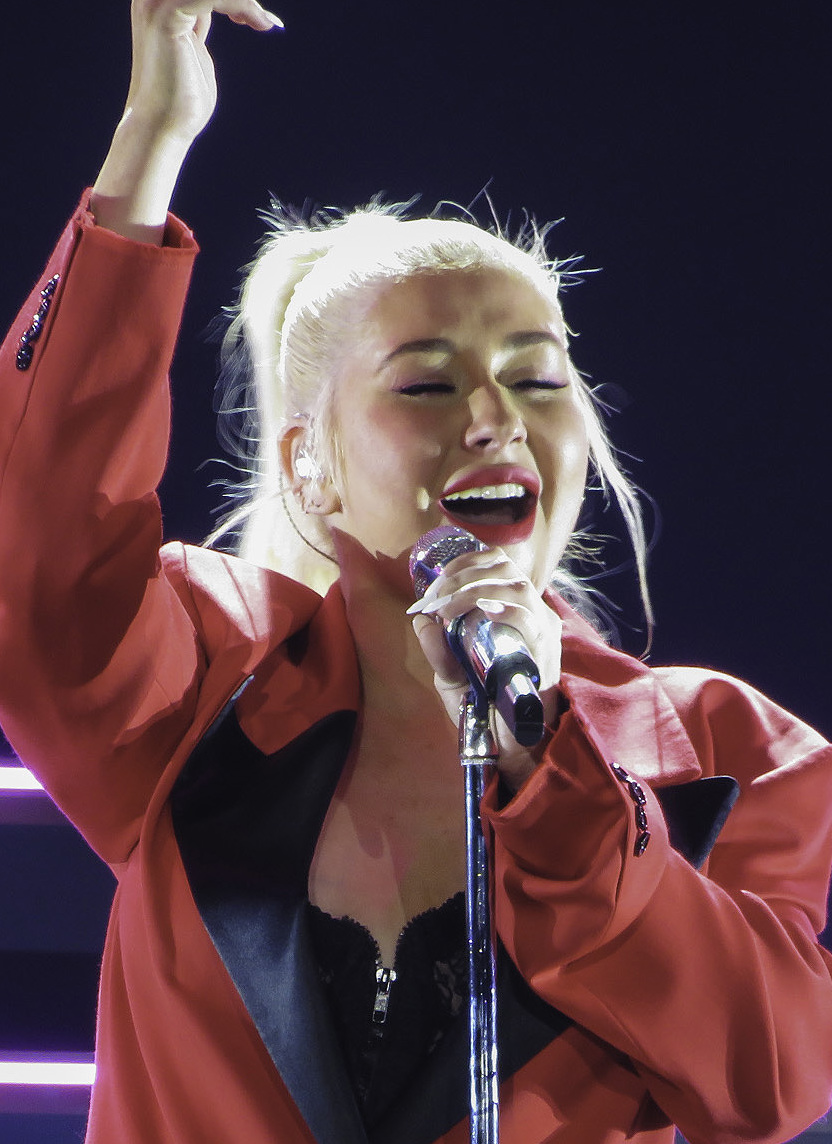
Aguilera performing on her Liberation Tour in 2018

Aguilera is one of the best selling music artists of all time, and has released nine studio albums, garnering a number of successful singles. Various music journalists and authors have since noted Aguilera's impact on the entertainment industry and has deemed her as one of the greatest pop artists. Aguilera has been considered one of the greatest vocalists in pop music, and has featured on various "greatest singers of all time" lists. (Note: Including that of Rolling Stone, Latina (at number one), Consequence of Sound, and MTV, with the latter ranking her as one of the best voices in music since the 1980s.) With the recognition of her vocal ability, she has been often been referred to as the "Voice of a Generation".

=== Honorifics ===
Billboard called Aguilera one of the greatest artists of the 2000s, with Variety writer Jeremy Helligar opining that Aguilera was "poised for Mariah Carey-level chart longevity". She has also been classified as one of the main references of Millennials. Writing for Vice, Wanna Thompson analyzed Aguilera's fame in the turn of the 21st century, stating that she "dominated mainstream pop-related discussions" and that her "perfectly packaged music and looks appealed to tweens and teens who wanted to be like the pretty, chart-topping pop stars plastered everywhere". The commercial success of her first projects as a bubblegum pop singer caused an effect that influenced record labels to invest in new artists who attracted the same youthful appeal, catapulting names like Jessica Simpson and Mandy Moore.

In 2004, Aguilera was listed as one of the most influential people in the music market according to The Independent, and was ranked as the eighth greatest woman in the phonographic industry by VH1. In 2007, her self-titled debut album was added to the definitive list from Rock and Roll Hall of Fame, being recognized as one of "history's most influential and popular albums". In 2010, Aguilera was honored with a star on the Hollywood Walk of Fame. In 2024, Billboard listed Aguilera as an honorable mention from their list of the "25 Greatest Pop Stars of the 21st Century". In 2025, the same magazine ranked her as the 20th most successful female artist of the 21st Century. Various wax figures of Aguilera have also been displated at Madame Tussauds museums throughout multiple cities, including London, New York City and Amsterdam.

=== Recognition ===
Aguilera has been recognised for her vocal abilities. Etta James, one of Aguilera's biggest inspirations, appeared alongside Aguilera in 2006 for the magazine InStyle and expressed admiration for her vocals. She called her an "old soul" and stated that she "couldn't believe that big sound, that big voice was coming out of her [...] Tell me who you’ve seen that sings like her, because we don’t have anybody". Whitney Houston also cited Aguilera's tribute to Houston at the 2001 BET Awards, where Aguilera sung Houston's song "Run to You", as the best cover version of her song. Similarly, Celine Dion opined that Aguilera was "one of the most talented artists the world has ever seen and heard".

Other notable musicians that have recognized or praised Aguilera's vocal abilities include Patti LaBelle, Cher, Tina Turner, Aretha Franklin, Herbie Hancock, Mick Jagger, Axl Rose, and Patti Smith.

== Musicianship ==
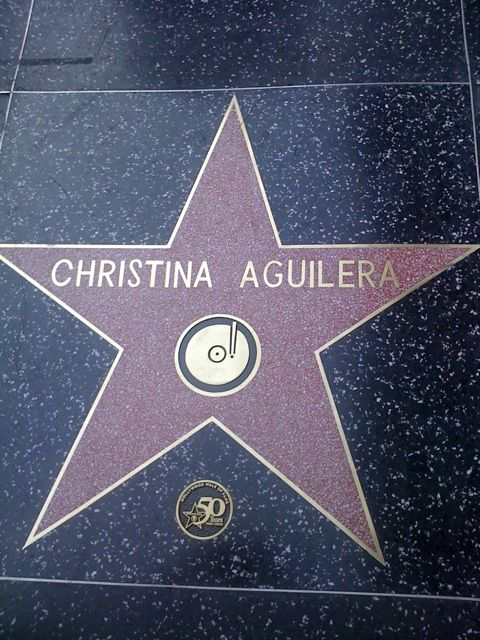
Aguilera's star on the Hollywood Walk of Fame which she received in 2010

=== Latin heritage ===
Aguilera's father is an Ecuadorian immigrant and she has been credited for honoring her Latin roots throughout her career. Forbes writer Jeff Benjamin noted that Aguilera has honored her roots "since the start of her career with Spanish albums, covers of classic songs and collaborations across the industry". In 2012, Aguilera noted that "I am Ecuadorian but [that early in her career] people felt so safe passing me off as a skinny, blue-eyed white girl". She noted that before her debut in 1999 she was told to change her last name many times, but fought to keep it. She noted in an interview that,

Christina Agee was an option, but that clearly wasn't going to fly. I was dead set against the idea, and I wanted to represent who I really was. Being Latina, it is a part of my heritage and who I am [...] I've been fighting for my last name my whole life.

Upon launching her music career in the late 1990s, Aguilera was named as one of the artists who shaped the "Latin explosion" and contributed to the Latin pop boom in American music in early years of the 21st century. In 1999, Los Angeles Times writer Agustin Gurza wrote that alongside other Spanish pop stars such as Shakira and Carlos Santana, "never before had so many Latinos spent so much time at the top of the pop charts in a single year". People en Español author Jennifer Mota also noted that Aguilera "created music to cross borders" which in turn helped "music executives understand how big the Latin market really was". POPline also noted that she "played a pivotal role in the expansion of Spanish-language music within today's American pop scene."

Aguilera has since been referred to as one of the most prominent Latin artists in the entertainment industry. In 2000, she released her first Spanish-language album Mi Reflejo to commercial success, which received the Latin Grammy Award for Best Female Pop Vocal Album, and two Billboard Latin Music Awards. In September 2018, the album was ranked number ten on the Billboard's Top 20 Latin Albums of All Time. The album itself was best-selling Latin pop album of 2000 and spent 19 weeks atop the Billboard's Top Latin Albums chart, becoming one of the few albums to spend the most weeks at number-one. In 2022, Aguilera released her second Spanish-language album Aguilera to generally favorable reviews and was nominated for ten Latin Grammy Awards, winning for Best Traditional Pop Vocal Album.

In 2024, her performance at the 1st Annual Latin Grammys was voted as the "biggest moment" in the awards history by Variety.

=== Controversial themes ===
Aguilera has often incorporated controversial themes in her music which has often been praised. Gerrick D. Kennedy writing for the Los Angeles Times opined that "for a generation who hit puberty during the great 2000 pop explosion, Aguilera was an essential voice with music that tackled [...] subject matters her contemporaries were shying away from".

The themes in her music portrays women as full human beings with subjectivity and renders women agency in owning their thoughts, speaking their mind, and practicing self-empowerment. This empowering cultural narrative acknowledges and empowers women to embrace their subjectivity, realize their value, and own their power in controlling their life.

— Chin Wai Wong from Hollins University on Aguilera's music themes.

She has often included feminism and sexuality in her work and has often denounced social double standards. Crack writer Emma Garland called Aguilera's 2002 album Stripped a "watershed feminist moment in 21st century pop". She opined that the album "was instantly venerated by women and gays, and completely terrifying to straight men" which in turn "copped a lot of flack at the time for its sexualised imagery". Journalists writing for Vice and The Guardian both analysed Stripped and found that Aguilera's use of sexual imagery has helped catalyze public discourse on the topic. Garland went on to add that Stripped is "best measured by its cultural impact on those it was always intended for – a mass audience of young people who had spent much of the late 90s and early 00s being patronised by an industry that served them dynamic but spiritually void bubblegum pop".

Aguilera has often defended the sex-positive movement. Reviewing Stripped, Sophie Wilkinson from Vice opined that the album "explored nuanced articulations of sexual desires and fears while highlighting the social double standards", in addition to giving "any woman the confidence to take charge of her sexuality and ownership of her body". Jennifer K. Armstrong, author of Sexy Feminism: A Girl's Guide to Love, Success, and Style (2013), similarly opined that Aguilera's music has "reject[ed] the double standards set forth by sexism and patriarchy". Aguilera cofounded the American sexual wellness company Playground in 2022 and noted that "[she] just wants to keep progressing and pushing the conversations forward, making [sexuality] safe and also fun", hoping to "inspire other women with her own view of sex positivity".

Lamar Dawson, a columnist from HuffPost, praised her feminist efforts in the music industry and recognized that "while [Aguilera] isn't the first pop star to place feminist rhetoric into pop culture, she led the charge at the beginning of the 21st century of influencing the next generation of impressionable teens who were too young for Janet [Jackson] and Madonna". The Irish Times writer Shilpa Ganatra agreed saying that Aguilera was leading force of the third wave of feminism, going on to influence artists such as Miley Cyrus and Lady Gaga. Her Campus writer Brooke Giles also cited Aguilera as the "OG feminist", noting that she set the "stage for women empowerment way before it became the popular trend in today's pop music". Aguilera herself noted in an interview with The Irish Times that "[Stripped] was me stepping up and saying I was a woman that's proud of my sexuality. I was proud of my vulnerability. I was proud of the fact that I've fought my way through this industry".

Another theme Aguilera has also advocated for is domestic violence, particularly throughout her music. Mary Anne Donovan, author of Christina Aguilera: A Biography (2010), noted that she often "channeled her fear and sadness away from the abuse in her family to instead create the music that became her art and her livelihood". Various critics have acknowledged Aguilera's experience with the topic during her childhood as a reason for incorporating this theme. (Note: Writing for Forbes, and People.) Donovan also opined that the theme influenced Aguilera's transition to adulthood and was a catalyst for her continual references of female empowerment in her music. During an interview with Billboard in 2006, Aguilera noted that she feels a "responsibility to share some of these things that aren't kind of the brighter sides of my life" to advocate for "People [who] can relate" so that they may "not feel as alone in the circumstance". Songs in which she sings about her own domestic violence experiences include "I'm OK", "Oh Mother", and "No Es Que Te Extrañe".

Chin Wai Wong from Hollins University also observed topics such as romance, introspection of vulnerability, gratitude for support, and sexual liberation in Aguilera's music, representing "multi-dimensional aspects of life [and] different social responsibilities a woman experiences". While critics noted the feminist message in her works, Aguilera was acknowledged for her "refusal to sanitize her own sexuality to meet either the norms of mainstream gender politics or mainline Feminism's resistance". The Guardian journalist Hermione Hoby opined that she "incites a sisterly spirit of collaboration [and] is not shy of the odd feministic declaration herself". Other themes addressed in her lyrics include self-respect, body image, and LGBT rights, in addition to "fighting for creative freedom and gender equality".

=== Videography ===
Aguilera's videography has been analysed by journalists for its impact on popular culture. Billboard writer Stephen Daw noted that Aguilera's music video catalogue is an "often overlooked aspect of [her] career". VH1 named Aguilera one of the greatest women of the video era. In 2012, Aguilera's videographic collection and various looks used throughout her career were part of an exhibition by the National Museum of Women in the Arts aimed at illustrating "the essential roles women have played in moving rock and roll and American culture forward". Hypebeast writer Jennifer Machin noted that her early music videos aesthetics, particularly for "Genie in a Bottle", is what helped maintain Aguilera's early innocent teen idol image. The video was directed by Diane Martel and received some comparisons to Mariah Carey's video for "Dreamlover" which was also directed by Martel. Her video for "What a Girl Wants" also found success, topping the TRL chart and was the most played video on MTV for six straight weeks.

The music video for her song "Dirrty", directed by David LaChapelle, received high media coverage for its explicit nature being the introduction to Aguilera's "hyper-sexualized" new image. The video was described as "one of the most controversial videos in pop music history". Despite its generally negative media reaction, the video has been listed as one of the greatest music videos of all time. (Note: By various publications including Slant Magazine, Billboard, MTV, and LA Weekly.) Issy Beech from i-D opined that the video allowed for other music videos to be even more open including Nicki Minaj's "Anaconda" and Miley Cyrus' "Wrecking Ball", noting that it "paved the way for open sexuality from women in pop". Rhiannon Lucy Cosslett, co-founder of The Vagenda, opined that the provocative dance routines in Aguilera's "Dirrty" was "empowering". Aguilera's dance in the video has been cited as one of the forerunners of the slutdrop dance style.

Aguilera's music video for "Beautiful", directed by Jonas Åkerlund, also received critical analysis, particularly for its scene of a gay kiss which has gone on to be considered one of the most important moments for LGBT culture. "Beautiful" was also elected as one of the greatest music videos of the 21st century by Billboard. In 2022, for the song's 20th anniversary, Aguilera released an updated version of the video with BBC writer Steven McIntosh noting that it highlighted "the impact of social media on young people's body image and mental health". McIntosh noted the video's final metaphoric scene of a smartphone in a pool of blood. ABC News writers Megan Stone and Angeline Jane Bernabe opined that the video explored messages for young girls and boys about the dangers of social media "with depictions of how girls are flooded with images of women with youthful faces and voluptuous bodies, while boys are encouraged to have the sculpted body of an action hero". They added that the video also denounced the use of "liposuction, bodybuilding and other cosmetic surgeries" through the techniques of the children holding up their cameras to film what they are pressured to look like.

== Commercial success ==
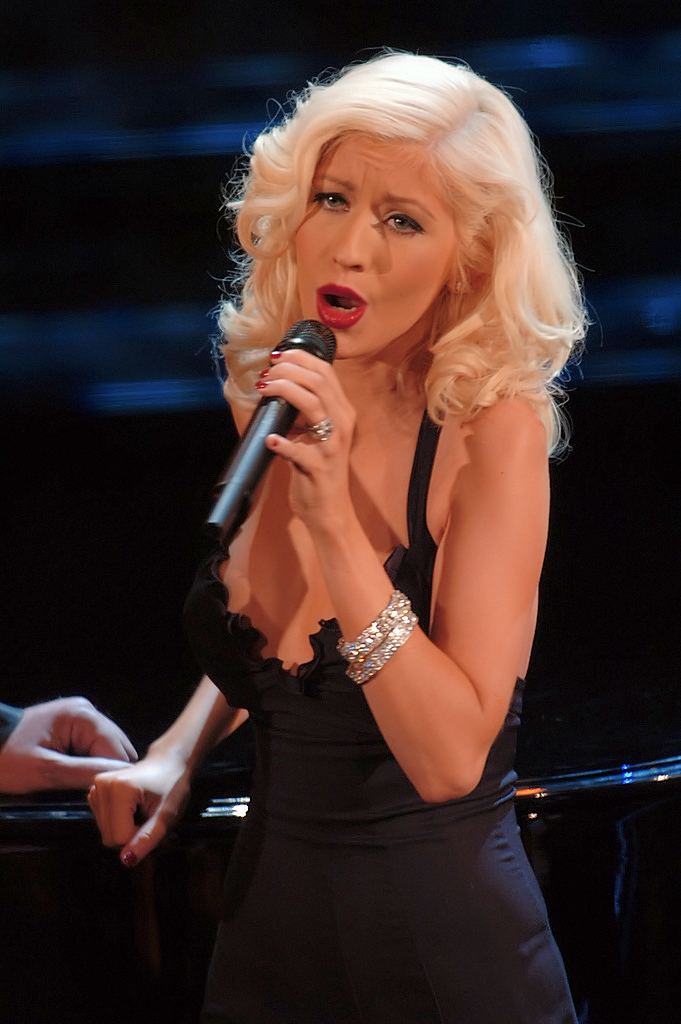
Aguilera (pictured in 2006) was listed among the most successful artists of the 2000s and 2010s decades by Billboard.

=== Billboard achievements ===
Aguilera has set various Billboard achievements being named the top female artist of the years 2000 and 2003 by the magazine. She was also one of the best-selling artists of the 2000s decade ranking at number 20. At the end of the 2010s, she was also listed as one of the most successful artists on the Billboard 200, Billboard Hot 100, and Mainstream Top 40 charts, for which the latter she was ranked at number 14 on the greatest of all time list.

With a total of ten songs topping the US Dance Club Songs chart, Aguilera became the thirty-fifth most successful artist on the chart. In 2009, she was recognized as the second best-selling solo artist on Billboard, and in 2011 she was the fourth female artist to top the Hot 100 chart over three consecutive decades. Mi Reflejo (2000) also remains one of the longest albums to chart at number one on the US Top Latin Albums chart.

=== Other achievements ===
Aguilera is recognized as one of the world's best-selling music artists. In the United States, she had sold 41.9 million albums and singles by September 2014, according to Nielsen SoundScan. As of 2022, the Recording Industry Association of America (RIAA) has certified Aguilera with over 54.2 million records, of which 17.5 million units came from her albums. Her debut album is certified eight times platinum and is one of the best-selling albums in the US.

In 2013, Aguilera's sales reached 9.4 million records in the United Kingdom, according to the Official Charts Company. Stripped (2002) was also recognized as one of the few albums to surpass 2 million copies sold, becoming one of the best-selling albums of the 21st century in the country.

"Moves Like Jagger", her collaboration with Maroon 5, was also ranked among the best-selling singles in Australia, Canada, South Korea, the United Kingdom, and the United States, as well as being one of the best-selling digital singles with over 14.4 million units. The song was also certified diamond by the RIAA making Aguilera one of the first pre-2000s female artist to earn a RIAA-certified diamond single.

Aguilera has reportedly earned over US$113.8 million from tickets sales of her concert tours throughout her career. In 2020, she was classified among the top female artists of the 21st century in the concert industry, having sold more than 1.8 million tickets for her performances, according Pollstar. Her largest audience concert was held during Mawazine Festival, in Morocco, attracting 250,000 people which eventually became the record in the event's history.

== Creative inspiration ==
=== Influence on other artists ===
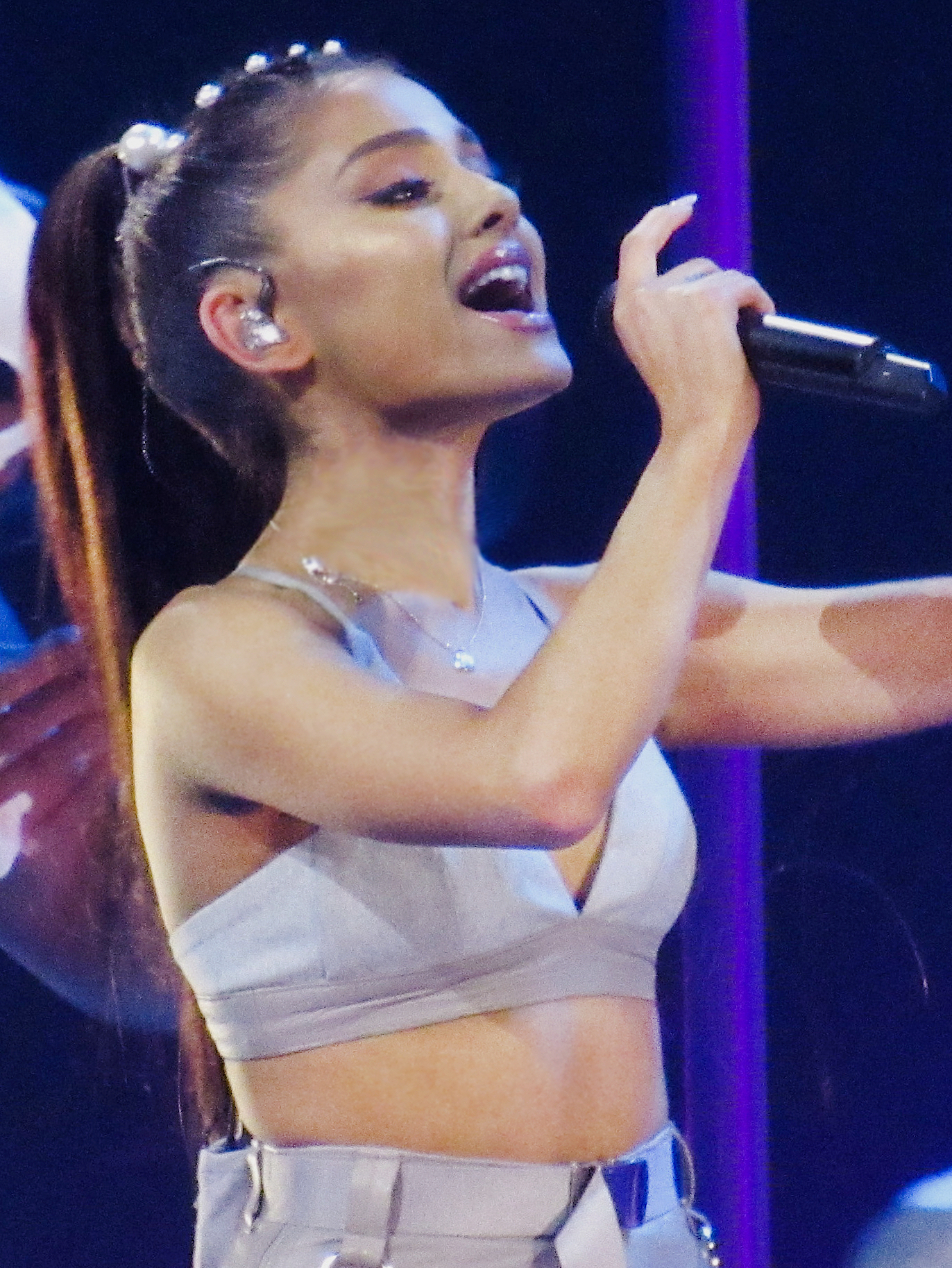
Ariana Grande

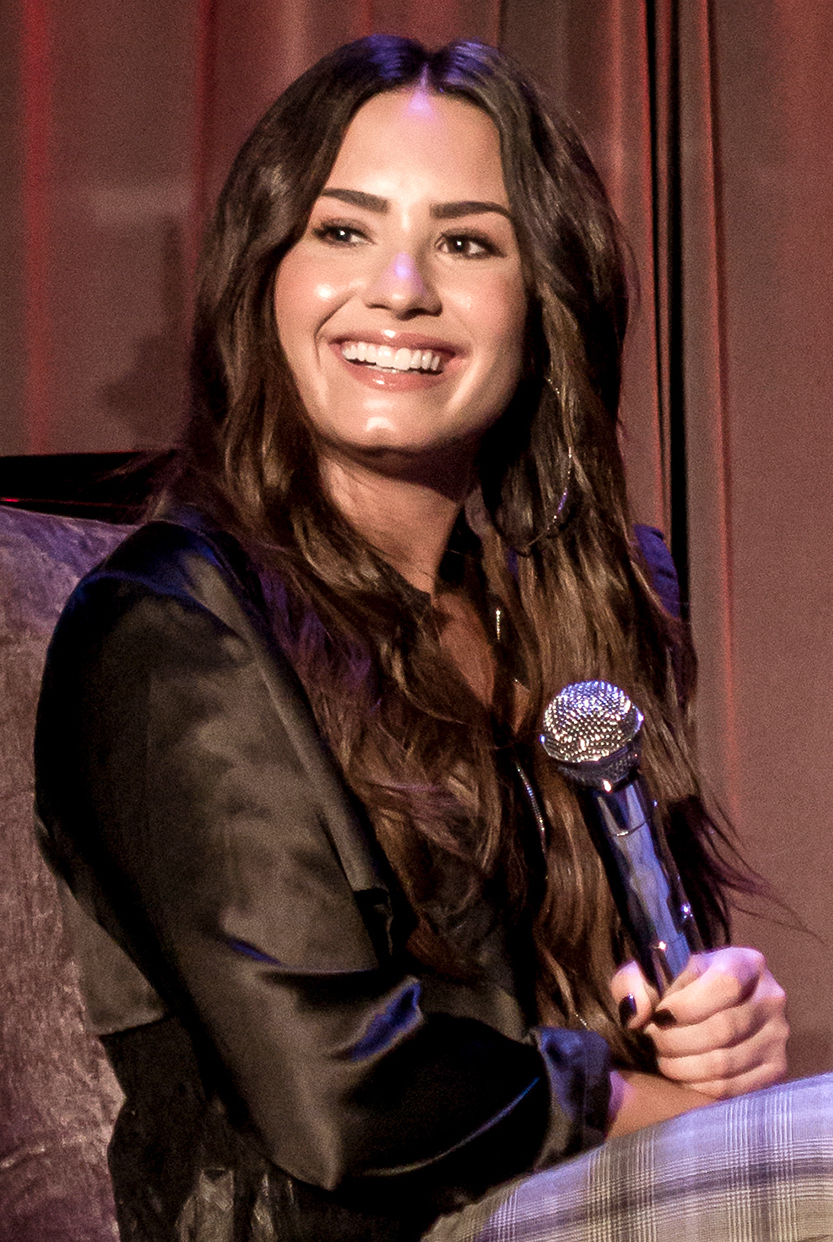
Demi Lovato

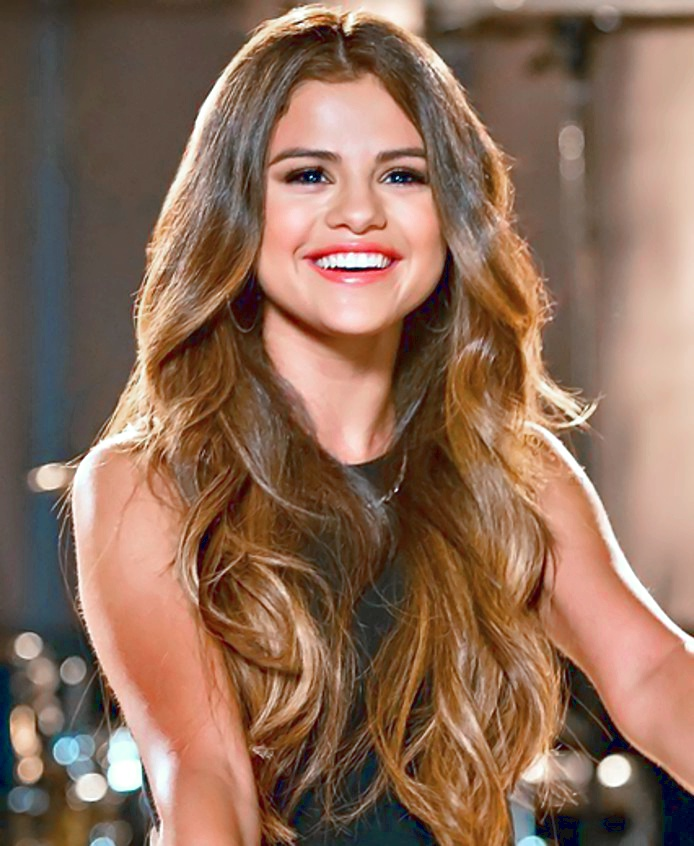
Selena Gomez

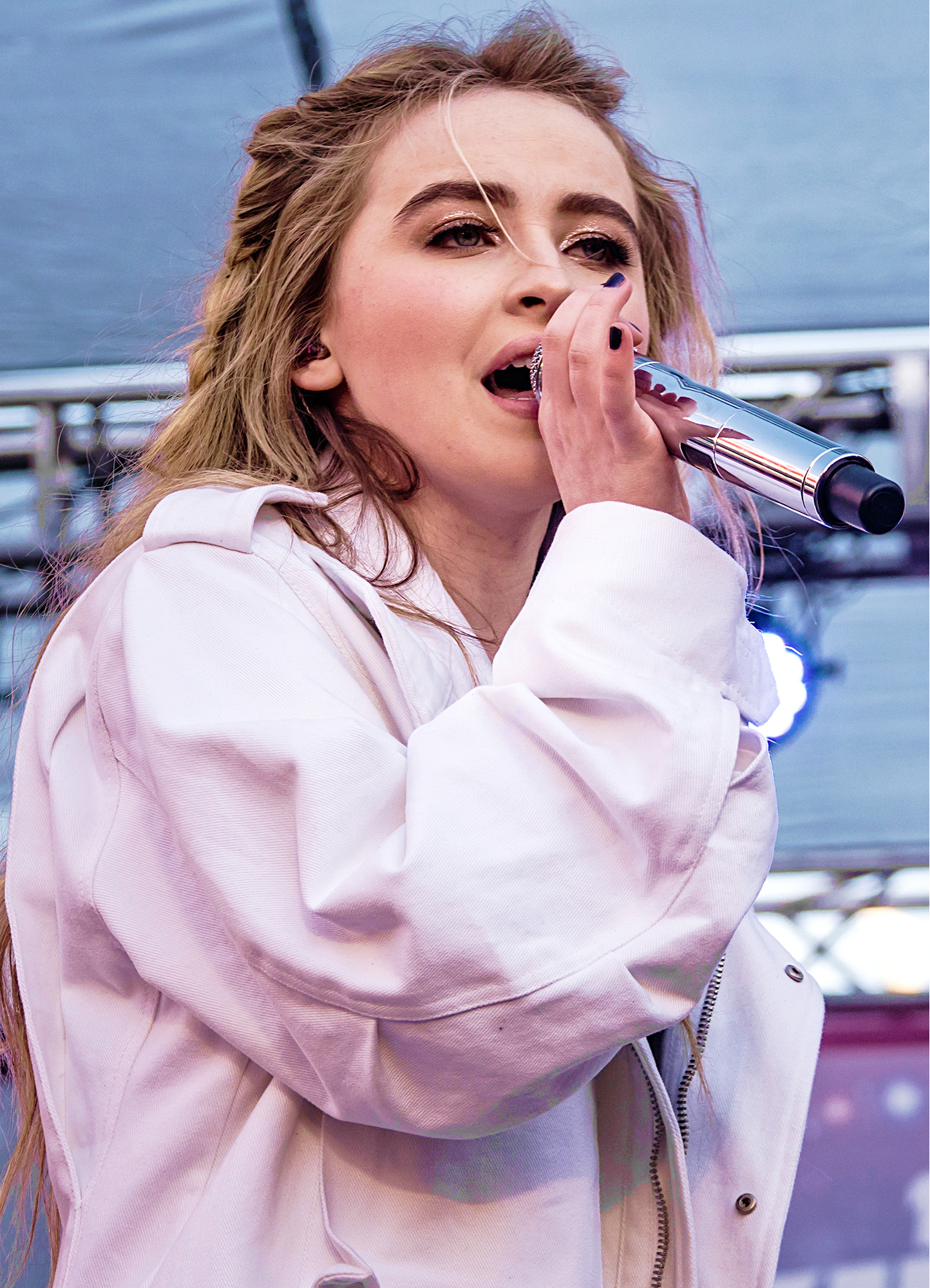
Sabrina Carpenter

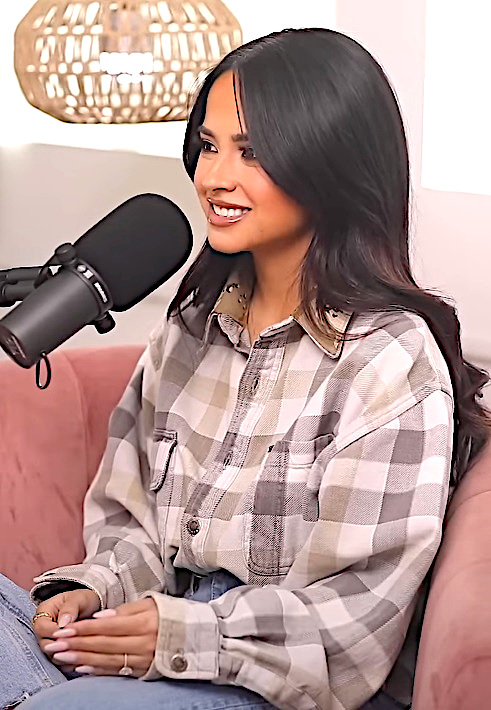
Becky G.

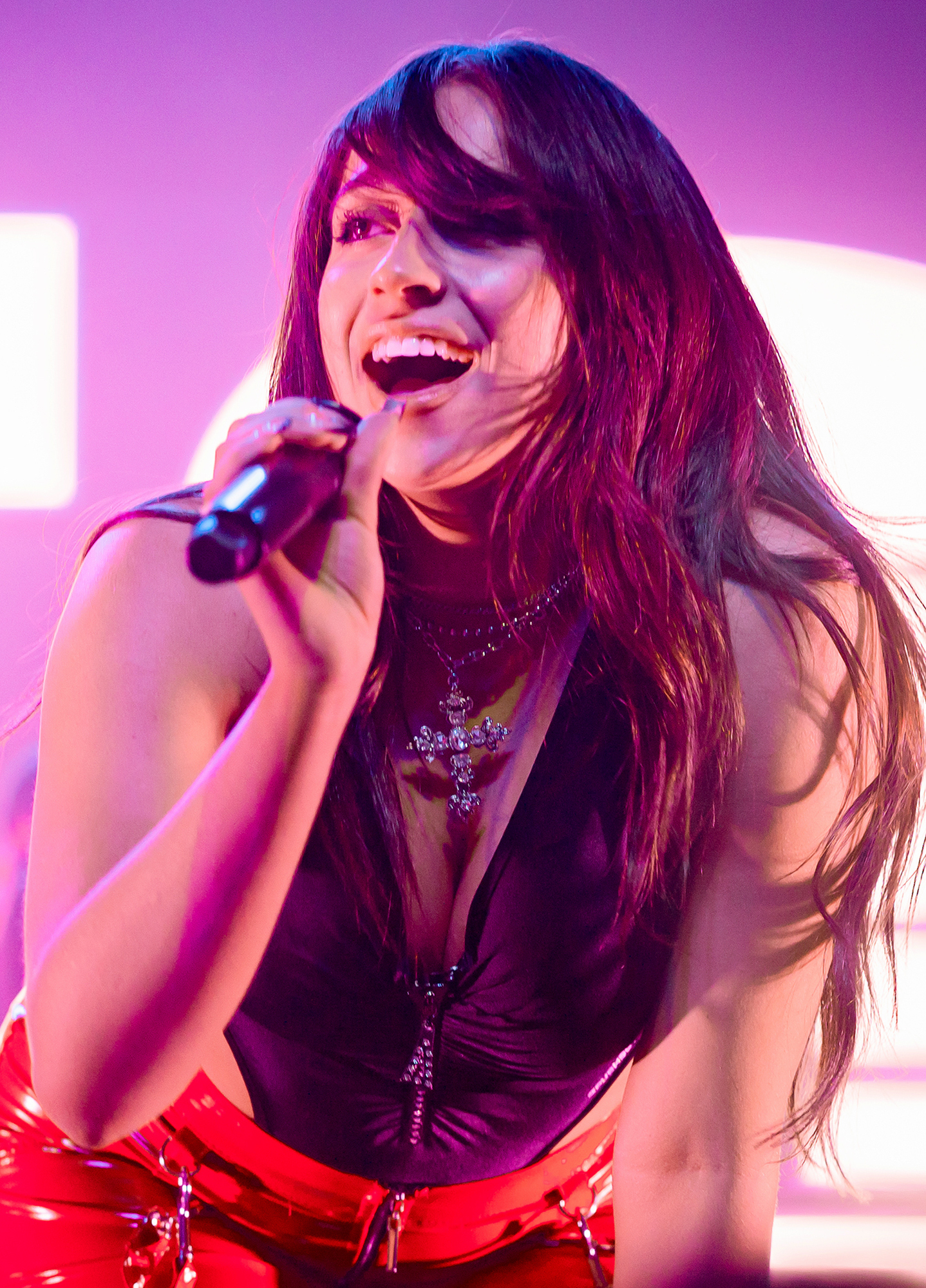
Tate McRae

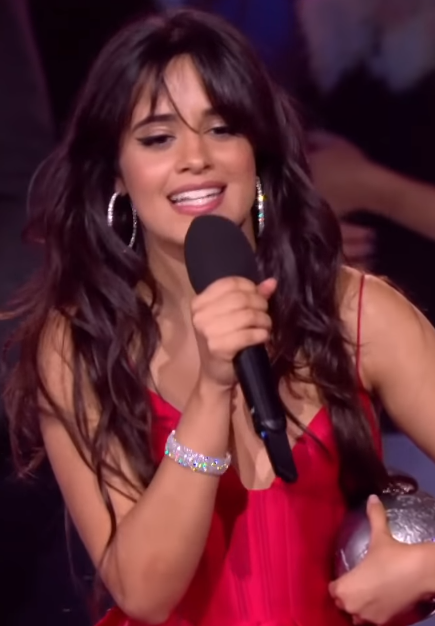
Camila Cabello

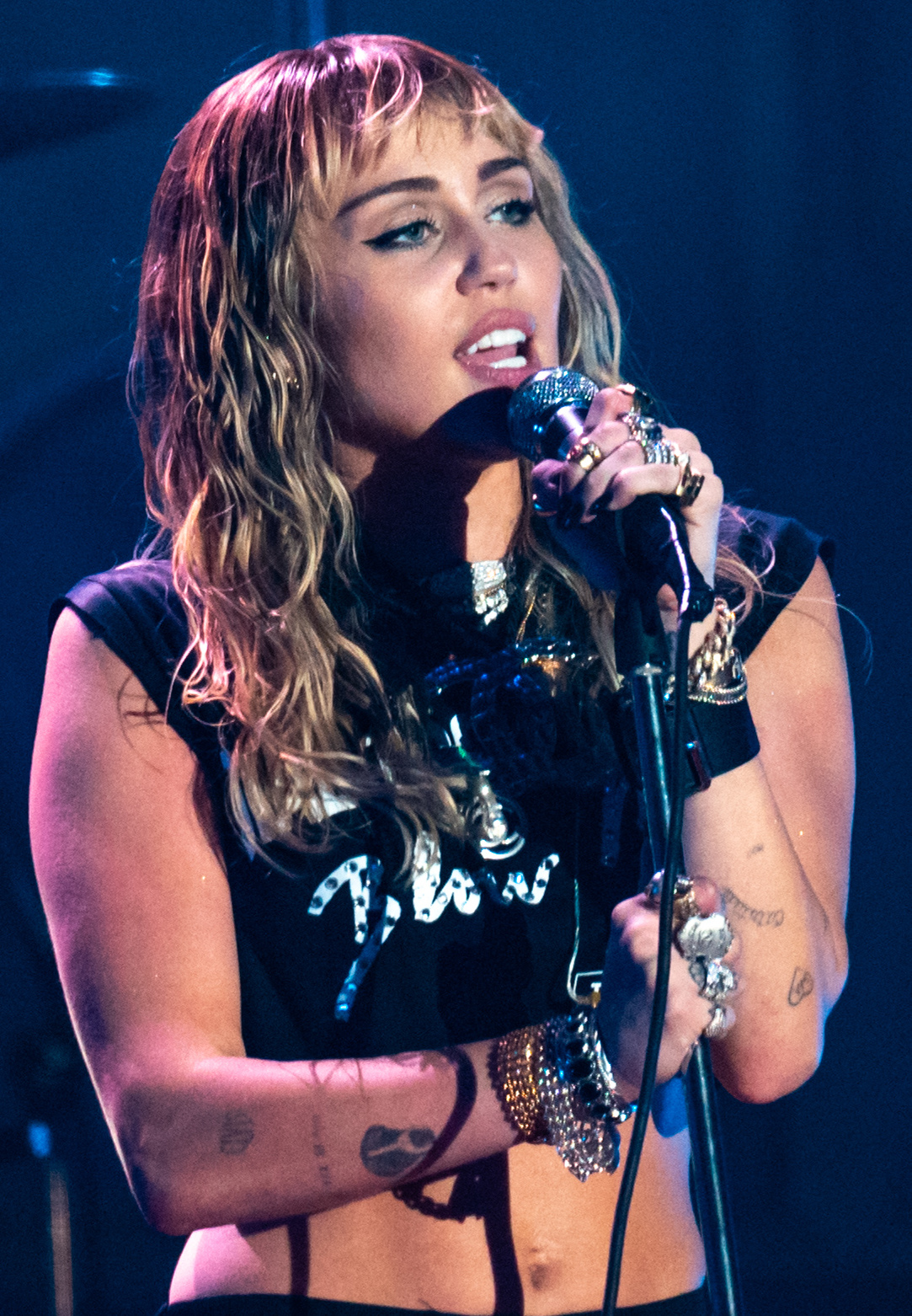
Miley Cyrus

Several artists have cited Aguilera as an influence including those pictured above.

Throughout her career, Aguilera's impact on popular culture has inspired and influenced numerous artists and acts. American singer Patti LaBelle cited Aguilera as one of the few contemporary performers who inspire her. Similarly, Whitney Houston cited Aguilera as one of the influences for her comeback album, I Look to You (2009). American singer Patti Smith cited Aguilera's 2007 Grammy performance of "It's a Man's Man's Man's World" as a reason to better her vocals. Other various artists who have cited Aguilera as an inspiration include,

- The 1975
- A Great Big World
- Adam Lambert
- Addison Rae
- Alessia Cara
- Alexa Goddard
- Alice Chater
- Angy Fernández
- Anitta
- Anne-Marie
- Ariana Grande
- Armand Joubert
- Ashley Tisdale
- Ava Max
- Bebe Rexha
- Becky G
- Britney Spears
- Brooke Simpson
- Camila Cabello
- Candice Glover
- Cardi B
- Cassie
- Charli XCX
- Chris Mann
- Christina Grimmie
- Danity Kane
- Danna Paola
- Demi Lovato
- Doja Cat
- Dua Lipa
- Ece Seçkin
- Ed Sheeran
- Farrah Moan
- Francinne
- Fickle Friends
- First Aid Kit
- Grimes
- Hadise
- Halsey
- Hayley Williams
- Iggy Azalea
- Iza
- Jacquie Lee
- Jão
- JoJo
- Jordan Pruitt
- Jordin Sparks
- Juju
- Kali Uchis
- Karol G
- Kelly Clarkson
- Kim Petras
- K. Michelle
- Lady Gaga
- Lauren Alaina
- Lauren Jauregui
- Little Mix
- Lucy Hale
- Miley Cyrus
- Meghan Trainor
- Melody Thornton
- Nathy Peluso
- Nicki Nicole
- Olivia Rodrigo
- Olly Alexander
- Paloma Mami
- Perrie Edwards
- Priscilla Alcantara
- Raye
- Reyna Roberts
- Rina Sawayama
- Rita Ora
- Rosalía
- Ruby Rose
- Sabrina Carpenter
- Sam Smith
- Selena Gomez
- SISTAR
- Stacie Orrico
- Tate McRae
- Taylor Swift
- Thuy
- Tinashe
- Tini
- Troye Sivan
- Vanessa Hudgens
- Yseult
- Zara Larsson

Various athletes have also cited Aguilera as an influence including figure skater Johnny Weir, ice dancers Zachary Donohue and Madison Hubbell, and swimmer Dana Vollmer. Film directors and producers Baz Luhrmann and Quentin Tarantino have also cited Aguilera as an inspiration, expressing interest in working with her. Samara Weaving's character in Borderline (2025) was also inspired by Aguilera.

=== Covers and samples ===
Aguilera's music has been recorded, performed and sampled by a variety of artists. Various artists who have covered Aguilera's music include Tori Kelly, Ed Sheeran, Christina Grimmie, Dove Cameron, Elvis Costello, Ava Max, Rag'n'Bone Man, Kenny G, Chaka Khan, Sabrina Carpenter, Ariana Grande, and Sam Smith.

American singer Camilla Cabello sampled Aguilera's "Genie in a Bottle" for her solo debut single "Crying in the Club". Carpenter, who cites Aguilera as one of her biggest inspirations, also cited Aguilera's 1990s "retro vibe" as an influence for her song "Bed Chem" off her album Short n' Sweet (2024).

=== Impact of Stripped ===
Aguilera's reinventions, particularly during the promotion for her album Stripped has been cited for inspiring and influencing the new generation of pop singers. Jeff Benjamin from Billboard stated that the album explored a "process of self-identification and declaration still influencing today's mainstream scene", in addition to "how of today's biggest pop stars have followed a similar path, exploring and incorporating these strategies into their careers". Genius writer Eddie Fu noted that Aguilera's transition from teen idol to her Stripped image inspired other ex-acts such as Miley Cyrus, Ariana Grande, Selena Gomez and Demi Lovato to follow suit and release "albums during their early-to-mid 20s which were more representative of the grown-up images they wanted to present to the world".

Gomez and Lovato cited the album as an influence for their albums Revival (2015) and Tell Me You Love Me (2017) respectively. Gomez noted that going topless on her album cover was inspired by Aguilera who did the same. Sabrina Carpenter has also praised Aguilera throughout her career, adding "Beautiful" to the "Soundtrack to Her Life" playlist for Teen Vogue. Carpenter also cited Stripped and the song "Beautiful" as the reason why she began to see "songs as a part of what [she] could do to showcase and develop [her] own voice. Sam Smith also cited the song "Beautiful" as a "true acceptance anthem", noting that it inspired him "with its important message to never stop celebrating who you are". Other artists who have cited Stripped and its songs as an influence for their own work include Rita Ora, Troye Sivan, and Zara Larsson.
