= My Reflection =

- Genre: Television special
- Directed by: Lawrence Jordan
- Starring: Christina Aguilera
- Country of origin: United States

Production
- Executive producers: Christina Aguilera; Ken Ehlich
- Production locations: Shrine Auditorium, Los Angeles
- Editor: David W. Foster
- Running time: 52 minutes

Original release
- Network: ABC
- Release: December 3, 2000

My Reflection, also known as Christina Aguilera: My Reflection or My Reflection: Live, (Note: The special has been marketed under several names. On the page of certifications of the Australian Record Industry Association (ARIA), it is referred to as My Reflection, whereas the Recording Industry Association of America (RIAA) calls it My Reflection: Live. Its IMDb page is named Christina Aguilera: My Reflection.) is a television special starring American singer Christina Aguilera, that premiered on Sunday, December 3, 2000, on ABC. It was directed by Lawrence Jordan and executive produced by Aguilera herself, alongside Ken Ehrlich. The special is a televised concert of Aguilera's performance at the Shrine Auditorium in Los Angeles, California. The special features guest appearances by Lil Bow Wow and Dr. John. It features songs from Aguilera's three studio albums, Christina Aguilera (1999), Mi Reflejo (2000), and My Kind of Christmas (2000), as well as covers. The show attracted 10.5 million viewers.

== Video album ==
My Reflection: Live

Video by Christina Aguilera
- Released: June 5, 2001
- Genres: Teen pop; latin pop; R&B
- Length: 66 min.
- Label: RCA
- Directors: Lawrence Jordan; Paul Hunter
- Producers: Christina Aguilera; Lee Rolontz; Ken Ehrlich

Christina Aguilera video chronology
Genie Gets Her Wish (1999)	My Reflection: Live (2001)	Stripped Live in the U.K. (2004)

The special was released as Aguilera's second video album through RCA Records and Image Entertainment.

According to a DVD Talk review: the DVD delivers a solid audio and video presentation, and while the concert is shown in full-frame rather than anamorphic widescreen, the video quality remains sharp and well-defined throughout, with clear stage lighting and minimal visual issues. The backstage footage is of slightly lower quality, but the concert footage itself holds up well. The audio is available in Dolby Digital 5.1, DTS 5.1, and Dolby 2.0, with the 5.1 mixes. The front speakers focus on the music, while the surround channels handle crowd noise and ambient sounds. The DTS track offers slightly better depth and clarity. The DVD also includes animated menus and a few Spanish-language music videos as extras.

The video album became a commercial success, being certified gold by the Recording Industry Association of America (RIAA) and platinum by the Australian Recording Industry Association (ARIA) as well as reaching number one and eight respectively in the music video charts of those regions.

=== Track listing ===
My Reflection – Live performances
No.	Title	Length
1.	"Reflection"
2.	"Genie in a Bottle"
3.	"Come On Over Baby (All I Want Is You)"
4.	"What a Girl Wants"
5.	"So Emotional" (with Lil' Bow Wow)
6.	"I Turn to You"
7.	"At Last" (Etta James cover)
8.	"Contigo en la Distancia"
9.	"Climb Ev'ry Mountain" (from The Sound of Music)
10.	"Falsas Esperanzas"
11.	"Alright Now"
12.	"Merry Christmas, Baby" (with Dr. John)
13.	"Have Yourself a Merry Little Christmas" (with Brian McKnight; from Meet Me in St. Louis)
14.	"Christmas Time" (with Lil' Bow Wow)

My Reflection – Bonus music videos
No.	Title	Length
1.	"Genio Atrapado"
2.	"Por Siempre Tú"
3.	"Ven Conmigo (Solamente Tú)"
4.	"The Christmas Song (Chestnuts Roasting on an Open Fire)"

=== Charts ===
Chart (2001)	Peak position
Australia Music Videos (ARIA)	8
UK Music Videos (OCC)	6
US Top Music Videos (Billboard)	1

=== Certifications ===
Region	Certification	Certified units/sales
Australia (ARIA)	Platinum	15,000^{^}
United States (RIAA)	Gold	50,000^{^}
^{^} Shipments figures based on certification alone.
