= I Turn to You (All-4-One song) =

1997 promotional single by All-4-One

Promotional single by All-4-One

from the album Space Jam: Music from and Inspired by the Motion Picture
- Released: June 17, 1997
- Recorded: September 1996
- Genre: Pop; R&B
- Length: 4:52
- Label: Atlantic
- Songwriter: Diane Warren
- Producers: Jimmy Jam; Terry Lewis

All-4-One singles chronology
"Someday" (1996)	"I Turn to You" (1997)	"Love Shouldn't Hurt" (1998)

Space Jam singles chronology
"For You I Will" (1997)	"I Turn to You" (1997)

Music video
- "I Turn to You" on YouTube

"I Turn to You" is a song written by American songwriter Diane Warren and first recorded by R&B quartet All-4-One from the soundtrack album to the film Space Jam (1996). The ballad, produced by Jimmy Jam and Terry Lewis, received little recognition until American pop singer-songwriter Christina Aguilera recorded it for her self-titled debut album. Aguilera, who worked with Warren on another song for her debut album, felt connected to the song after relating its lyrics to her relationship with her mother, and was encouraged by Warren to record the track.

Aguilera's version received mixed reviews from music critics, with some praising her vocal delivery, while others went on to criticize the ballad for being too clichéd. Nevertheless, the song became a success in the United States, peaking at number three on the US Billboard Hot 100 and entered the charts of multiple countries across the world. In 2008, "I Turn to You" was covered by Nina Girado, a Filipino pop/R&B singer, for her album Nina Sings the Hits of Diane Warren. It has been used in many singing competition series, such as American Idol and The Voice.

== Background ==
On November 12, 1996, Atlantic Records released the accompanying soundtrack for the film Space Jam. The soundtrack includes "I Turn to You", a song written by Diane Warren and recorded by boy band All-4-One. Its production was done by James Harris III and Terry Lewis. It is a pop song and lasts for a duration of 4:52 (four minutes and fifty-two seconds). A promotional single was released with new remixes and All-4-One recorded a music video for the song. The group expected it to be released as a commercial single, however, the label decided against it, feeling that in spite of three hit singles, "Fly Like an Eagle", "I Believe I Can Fly" and "For You I Will", the soundtrack had nothing else to offer. Warren, who felt the song had the potential to become a number one hit and even said to Atlantic that "I'll put my own money behind it if you just release it," decided to find someone else to record it and make it a hit single. The song ended up being consigned to the film's end credits, being the last song to play after "Hit 'Em High" at the end of the scene montage.

Tim O'Brien was involved in the additional production and arrangement of the single.

== Christina Aguilera version ==
"I Turn to You"

Single by Christina Aguilera

from the album Christina Aguilera
- B-side: "Por Siempre Tú"
- Released: March 28, 2000
- Recorded: 1999
- Studio: Barking Doctor (New York City)
- Genre: Pop; R&B
- Length: 4:33 (album version); 4:03 (radio edit)
- Label: RCA
- Songwriter: Diane Warren
- Producer: Guy Roche

Christina Aguilera singles chronology
"What a Girl Wants" (1999)	"I Turn to You" (2000)	"Come on Over Baby (All I Want Is You)" (2000)

Audio sample
- "I Turn to You" by Christina Aguilera: file; help

Music video
- I Turn to You on YouTube

=== Background ===
After signing a record deal with RCA Records, Christina Aguilera started working on songs from her debut album, set to be released in January 1999. Ron Fair was the album's executive producer and according to him, "She was very much a raw talent, so building a collection of songs that would become her first album was a time-consuming process. We wanted to find the ones that could knock the door down and put her up there." Famous songwriter Diane Warren was hired to write material for the album, eventually writing "Somebody's Somebody" and suggested that "I Turn to You" would be perfect for her voice. Eventually, Aguilera recorded "I Turn to You" and included it on her self-titled debut album, and the song was chosen as the album's third single. It was sent to U.S. radio on March 28, 2000, while its CD single was released on June 13, 2000. A Spanish version of the song entitled "Por Siempre Tú" was recorded and also released as a single, and an alternate vocal mix of "Por Siempre Tú" was included on her first Spanish album, Mi Reflejo.

=== Composition ===
"I Turn to You" is a soul-influenced ballad and lasts for a duration of 4:33 (four minutes and thirty-three seconds). According to the sheet music published by Alfred Publishing, it has a slow tempo of 62 beats per minute and a key of D♭ major. Aguilera's vocal range spans from the low-note of A♭_{3} to the high-note of F_{5}. Besides being the songwriter, Diane Warren served as the executive producer of the track, while Guy Roche arranged, produced and programmed the track. Tim Pierce and Michael Thompson provided guitars, Mick Guzauski mixed it, while background vocals were provided by Aguilera and Sue Ann Carwell.

Lyrically, the song is about calling upon the love of that special one when times get tough. For Aguilera, the song "is about that sort of perfect love, which we all dream. This kind of song can make you feel safe and warm anytime of the year. And there's no one better to turn to for that than my own mother," she claimed. "For a shield, from the storm for a friend, for a love to keep me safe and warm, I turn to you/For the strength to be strong, for the will to carry on/For everything you do, for everything that's true, I turn to you," she sings in the chorus.

=== Critical reception ===
"I Turn to You" received mixed reviews from music critics, with some praising Aguilera's vocals, while others criticizing the ballad for being too formulaic. In a positive review, Amanda Murray of Sputnikmusic called the song a "truly well-made pop song", writing that "the music plays a diminished role and Aguilera's voice is allowed to soar and shine moreso than on any of the other tracks." Despite writing that Aguilera "does deliver on the glorious mid-section," Chuck Taylor of Billboard felt that the track "is about as clichéd as ballad gets," sounding "more like a leftover from the stack rather than the kind of glorious anthem Warren is capable of," calling it a remake of Whitney Houston's "Count On Me".

Music critic Kenneth Partridge complimented the song, calling it "sweet" and "inspirational", and noted that "Christina turns in a winning vocal performance". Nikki Tranter of PopMatters called it "a nice little song ruined by that horrid pop beat threatening to destroy cheesy love songs for all time," writing that "the beat alone drags Christina's Etta James potential back down to Mariah Carey quality." Beth Johnson of Entertainment Weekly called it a "maudlin ballad best suited to thirtysomething divas," calling it "a near-identical rip-off of Diane Warren's own Celine Dion smash, 'Because You Loved Me'." Julene Snyder of Sonic.net considered "I Turn to You" a "tear-jerker designed to incite concertgoers to link arms and sing along, even while some of us cringe at the over-the-top vocal histrionics." In retrospect, Billboard's Chris Malone called the song "an expertly written ballad". AOL Radio ranked the song at number eight on the list of Aguilera's "top 10 hits", and AXS placed it at number three of a similar list. "I Turn to You" has been nominated for Choice Music — Best Love Song at the 2000 Teen Choice Awards.

=== Chart performance ===
"I Turn to You" debuted at number 50 on the Billboard Hot 100 chart, becoming the Hot Shot Debut of the week ending April 15, 2000. It also debuted on the Hot 100 Airplay chart, at number 47, with an audience of 28.5 million, also becoming the highest-debuting song on the airplay chart. In its second week, the song jumped to number 39, while in its third week the song climbed to number 30. The song entered the top-twenty on the week of May 20, 2000 (at number 19), and peaked on the week ending July 1, 2000, with a huge climb from number 17 to number 3, becoming its peak position and Aguilera's third top-ten single, making it the only single from the album to fail to reach number one. It peaked at number 5 on the Adult Contemporary chart, becoming her highest-charting single at the time. In Canada, the song peaked inside the top-ten, at number 10.

"I Turn to You" reached the top 20 in New Zealand, Spain and the United Kingdom. In New Zealand, "I Turn to You" peaked at number 11 and spent 18 weeks on the chart; her longest of the album, in Spain, it peaked at number 12, while in the United Kingdom, the song peaked at number 19, becoming Aguilera's lowest charting single there. Elsewhere, the song cracked the top-forty. In Australia, "I Turn to You" also became Aguilera's lowest single on the charts, reaching number 40 and spending 4 weeks on the chart.

=== Music video ===
The music video for Aguilera's version of "I Turn to You" was shot from February 26–28, 2000 and was directed by Joseph Kahn. Mistakenly, in the show Making the Video, the director says Rupert C. Almont. According to Aguilera, "This video is a little different than my other videos [...] I'm pretty much on a stage just belting my heart out. And the whole city that I'm singing out to, and I'm narrating different events that are going on in this city are in-sync with me." Production was finished on March 26, 2000, and it premiered on April 3, 2000, during the MTV's Making the Video and made its world premiere on MTV's Total Request Live on April 10, 2000.

The video's storyline follows a young woman getting into an accident, after arguing with her mother. Later, her mother is seen worriedly waiting for word on where she is at the late hour. The video ends with the girl being given the support she needs by her mother. Christina is seen singing in front of a microphone before walking in the rain with an umbrella, and on a rooftop. The rooftop scene was shot in front of a green screen, not in a real rooftop, as seen on the making of. The Celebrity Cafe listed it at number 5 on their "Top 10 Christina Aguilera music videos" list. BuzzFeed ranked the video on its list of the best music videos directed by Joseph Kahn, and called the scene where Aguilera is "walking in the middle of a busy road with an umbrella" iconic.

=== Live performances ===
Aguilera performed "I Turn to You" in a number of places, first being in 1999 alongside Tevin Campbell at the Alma Awards (April 11, 1999) followed Saturday Night Live (April 8, 2000) & The Rosie O'Donnell Show being the first three. She also performed on a medley with "What a Girl Wants" during the American Music Awards of 2000, "Party in the Park", "The Music Factory Dutch" and many others. Aguilera also performed the track during her "Christina Aguilera in Concert" tour as well as on the Genie Gets Her Wish home video, where Heather Phares of AllMusic praised the performance of the song, writing that on the track "Aguilera's undeniable vocal gifts shine through," and on her My Reflection DVD (2001).

=== Spanish version ===
"Por Siempre Tú"

Song by Christina Aguilera

from the album Mi Reflejo
- Recorded: September 12, 2000
- Length: 4:05
- Label: RCA
- Songwriters: Rudy Pérez; Diane Warren
- Producers: Rudy Pérez; Guy Roche; Ron Fair (exec.); Diane Warren (exec.)

Music video
- Por Siempre Tú on YouTube

In 1999, Aguilera began recording her first Spanish album in Miami with Cuban-American producer Rudy Pérez. He composed Spanish versions of five songs from Aguilera's debut album, including "I Turn to You", which became "Por Siempre Tú". "Por Siempre Tú" was written and produced by Pérez among the former producer of the song, Guy Roche. Diane Warren and Ron Fair executively produced the track, while Aguilera, Pérez and Wendy Pendersen provided background vocals. Pérez stated that Aguilera did not know any Spanish while recording; he remedied the problem by phonetically writing out lyrics and included a system that allowed Aguilera to pronounce the "r's" in the songs.

Her decision to record in Spanish scored points with the Spanish-speaking audience, said Haz Montana, program director at the Los Angeles Latin-music station KSSE-FM. "There's usually a sizeable rejection when someone just translates an English song and doesn't speak a lick of Spanish," he said. "She's defied the odds." He further commented: "Her accent is impeccable," he said. "There may be a slight nuance here and there that tells you that Spanish is not her first language, but that's as far as it gets." "Por Siempre Tú" was released as a single during the time "I Turn to You" was also released.

Sean Piccoli of Sun-Sentinel described Diane Warren's song as, "one of those Wind Beneath My Wings lifter-uppers that she cranks out for the likes of Celine Dion and Faith Hill," and noted that "Aguilera, like Warren's other interpreters, is faithfully cringe-inducing and overdramatic. She shares their deafness to understatement and can no more reel it in for this or any other moment that might benefit from a lighter touch." Piccoli's thoughts on the Mi Reflejo album were summed up as, "For anyone who thinks Taco Bell is authentic Mexican, this is Latin pop." "Por Siempre Tú" peaked at number six on the Billboard Hot Latin Tracks chart, becoming Aguilera's first top-ten single on the Latin charts. It spent 10 weeks on the charts.

A music video for the song was directed by Joseph Kahn, who also directed the video for "I Turn to You". The scenes were the same as the English version, while also featuring Christina singing the Spanish version in front of a microphone and on a rooftop. Aguilera performed the Spanish version on the "Caracas Pop Festival" in 2001 as well as on her Mi Reflejo Tour.

=== Track listings ===
US CD single

1. "I Turn to You" – 4:01
2. "Por Siempre Tú" – 3:53

European maxi single

1. "I Turn to You" (Radio Edit) – 3:53
2. "I Turn to You" (Radio Edit – Music Intro) – 4:03
3. "What a Girl Wants" (Thunderpuss Fiesta Edit) – 3:25
4. "What a Girl Wants" (Thunderpuss Dirty Radio Mix) – 3:16

=== Personnel ===
- Christina Aguilera – lead and background vocals
- Guy Roche – producer, arranger, keyboards, programming
- Michael Landau, Michael Thompson – electric guitars
- Tim Pierce – acoustic guitar
- John Glaser – Moog synthesizer
- Sue Ann Carwell – background vocals

=== Other versions and impact ===
CCM singer Jonathan Pierce covered the song for his 1999 album Sanctuary. Aguilera's version of "I Turn to You" was part of the soundtrack of Brazilian soap opera Uga-Uga (2000). In 2005, American singer Vonzell Solomon performed the track during the fourth season of American Idol. In 2008, Nina Girado, a Filipino pop/R&B singer, covered the track for her fourth studio album Nina Sings the Hits of Diane Warren. In 2020, American Idol contestant and winner Just Sam performed the song as a dedication to her grandmother, part of the season's Mother's Day Tribute after becoming top 7 in the competition.

In a 2013 interview, American recording artist Lady Gaga stated that she was inspired by Aguilera's version of the track, saying, "When I was 15, I was singing 'I Turn to You' at the top of my lungs trying to hit all her notes. So she was an inspiration to me to have a wider vocal range." Most recently, the song was used as a battle song between contestants Beth Spangler and Mia Pfirrman during the seventh season of the American singing competition The Voice.

=== Charts ===
==== Weekly charts ====
Weekly chart performance for "I Turn to You"
Chart (2000)	Peak position
Australia (ARIA)	40
Austria (Ö3 Austria Top 40)	1
Belgium (Ultratop 50 Flanders)	30
Belgium (Ultratop 50 Wallonia)	33
Canada (Canadian Singles Chart)	10
Canada Top Singles (RPM)	7
Canada Adult Contemporary (RPM)	2
Canada CHR (Nielsen BDS)	8
Chile (Notimex)	3
Croatia International (HRT)	3
El Salvador (Notimex)	1
Europe (Eurochart Hot 100)	55
Finland Airplay (Suomen virallinen lista)	17
Germany (GfK)	65
Ireland (IRMA)	17
Netherlands (Dutch Top 40)	40
Netherlands (Single Top 100)	50
New Zealand (Recorded Music NZ)	11
Poland Airplay (Music & Media)	6
Scottish Singles Sales (Official Charts)	22
Spain (Promusicae)	12
Sweden (Sverigetopplistan)	47
Switzerland (Schweizer Hitparade)	30
UK Singles (Official Charts)	19
US Billboard Hot 100	3
US Adult Contemporary (Billboard)	5
US Adult Contemporary Recurrents (Billboard)	2
US Adult Pop Airplay (Billboard)	27
US Pop Airplay (Billboard)	8
US Rhythmic Airplay (Billboard)	10
US Top 40 Tracks (Billboard)	11

Weekly chart performance for "Por Siempre Tú"
Chart (2000)	Peak position
Chile (El Siglo de Torreón)	3
Uruguay (El Siglo de Torreón)	1
US Hot Latin Songs (Billboard)	6
US Latin Pop Airplay (Billboard)	2
US Tropical Airplay (Billboard)	16

==== Year-end charts ====
Year-end chart performance for "I Turn to You"
Chart (2000)	Position
Brazil (Crowley)	24
US Billboard Hot 100	42
US Adult Contemporary (Billboard)	14
US Adult Top 40 (Billboard)	86
US Mainstream Top 40 (Billboard)	50
US Rhythmic Top 40 (Billboard)	45

Chart (2001)	Position
US Adult Contemporary (Billboard)	38

=== Certifications and sales ===
Region	Certification	Certified units/sales
South Korea	—	83,215

=== Release history ===
Release dates and formats for "I Turn to You"
Region	Date	Format(s)	Label(s)	Ref.
United States	March 28, 2000	Contemporary hit radio; rhythmic contemporary radio	RCA	
Sweden	April 25, 2000	Maxi CD	RCA	
United States	May 1, 2000	Adult contemporary; hot adult contemporary; modern adult contemporary radio	RCA	
Germany	May 8, 2000	Maxi CD	BMG	
France	May 22, 2000	Maxi CD	BMG	
United States	June 13, 2000	12-inch vinyl; CD	RCA	
Canada	June 20, 2000	CD	—	
United Kingdom	July 10, 2000	Cassette; CD	RCA	
France	August 22, 2000	CD	BMG	
