= Genie Gets Her Wish =

Video by Christina Aguilera
- Released: December 14, 1999
- Genre: Teen pop; R&B
- Length: 70 minutes
- Label: RCA; Sony Music (Germany)
- Director: Clare Grace Davies
- Producer: Davies

Christina Aguilera video chronology
Genie Gets Her Wish (1999)	My Reflection (2001)

Genie Gets Her Wish is the first VHS/DVD by Christina Aguilera. It was released on December 14, 1999, through RCA Records. It features performances of her number-one single, "Genie in a Bottle", studio footage, live concert performances, and exclusive peeks backstage. It was certified Platinum by the Recording Industry Association of America (RIAA). It peaked at number 1 in Sweden. Originally released on VHS, it was later re-released on DVD the following year.

== Background ==
Aguilera told the MTV Radio Network about the DVD:

"It will be interesting to see all the kinds of sides of me. Cause you do get to see me onstage, you know, 'Christina Aguilera onstage.' "But then, what happens whenever the cameras (are) off?" she continued. "She goes home, takes off her makeup, and gets ready for bed? You know, (what happens) after all these fans are done (with the show) and after she's done meeting them and signing autographs? What's she like? I'm a really different person aside from I seem to be publicly," she concluded. "I'm very, very introverted."

== Content ==
Genie Gets Her Wish is a video album and a documentary. It features clips from Aguilera's life between 1998 and 1999, while recording and promoting her eponymous debut album, as well as music videos. During the documentary portions, Aguilera is shown rehearsing her performances and recording in studio sessions, while songs from the album play over the clips. She is also shown during performances, as well as CD signings. Throughout the video, Aguilera speaks about her career, life, and her influences. The music portions show clips from Aguilera's music videos for "Genie in a Bottle", "So Emotional", and "The Christmas Song (Chestnuts Roasting on an Open Fire)". The music video featured for "When You Put Your Hands on Me" shows Aguilera rehearsing a live performance for the song, as well as clips during the album cover shoot.

== Release ==
Genie Gets Her Wish was released on VHS in its original release on December 14, 1999. It was re-released on DVD on February 8, 2000. The DVD was later released in Germany on November 9, 2012, through Sony Music.

== Critical reception ==
Professional ratings
Review scores
Source	Rating
AllMusic	3/5 stars
DVD Talk	B−

The critic Heather Phares, from AllMusic notes that Genie Gets Her Wish combines Christina Aguilera's pop hits with behind-the-scenes footage and fan interviews, though the dialogue feels overly staged. He also said that Aguilera's vocal talent shines in performances like "So Emotional," "I Turn to You," and a surprising cover of "At Last", but while the DVD offers a partial but intriguing glimpse into her stardom, it lacks interactive features.

Aaron Beierle from DVD Talk finds Genie Gets Her Wish to be a well-made DVD, focusing on Christina Aguilera's concerts, recording sessions, and candid moments. According to him the documentary balances polished footage with casual, home video-style clips, making it moderately entertaining, though at times overly edited. He also point out that the music videos sound enjoyable in Dolby 2.0 but lack the immersive quality of stronger audio formats, but despite these shortcomings, the video quality is excellent, with sharp and vibrant visuals. The critic praises Aguilera's talent and potential but feels the additional features could be improved.

== Track listing ==
1. "Genie in a Bottle"
2. "So Emotional"
3. "Come On Over (All I Want Is You)"
4. "What a Girl Wants"
5. "I Turn to You"
6. "At Last"
7. "When You Put Your Hands On Me"
8. "The Christmas Song (Chestnuts Roasting on an Open Fire)"

== Charts ==
Chart (2000)	Peak position
Swedish DVD (Sverigetopplistan)	1
UK Music Videos (OCC)	11
US Billboard Top Music Videos	7

== Certifications ==
Certifications and sales for Genie Gets Her Wish
Region	Certification	Certified units/sales
United States (RIAA)	Platinum	100,000^{^}
^{^} Shipments figures based on certification alone.

== Release history ==
Region	Date	Format	Catalogue no.	Label	Ref.
United States	December 14, 1999	VHS	65006	RCA Records	
United States	February 8, 2000	DVD	65008	RCA Records	
Germany (Note: The DVD was re-released in 2012 in Germany.)	November 9, 2012	DVD	88765400839	Sony Music Entertainment	
