= Armand Joubert =

South African singer-songwriter (born 1955)

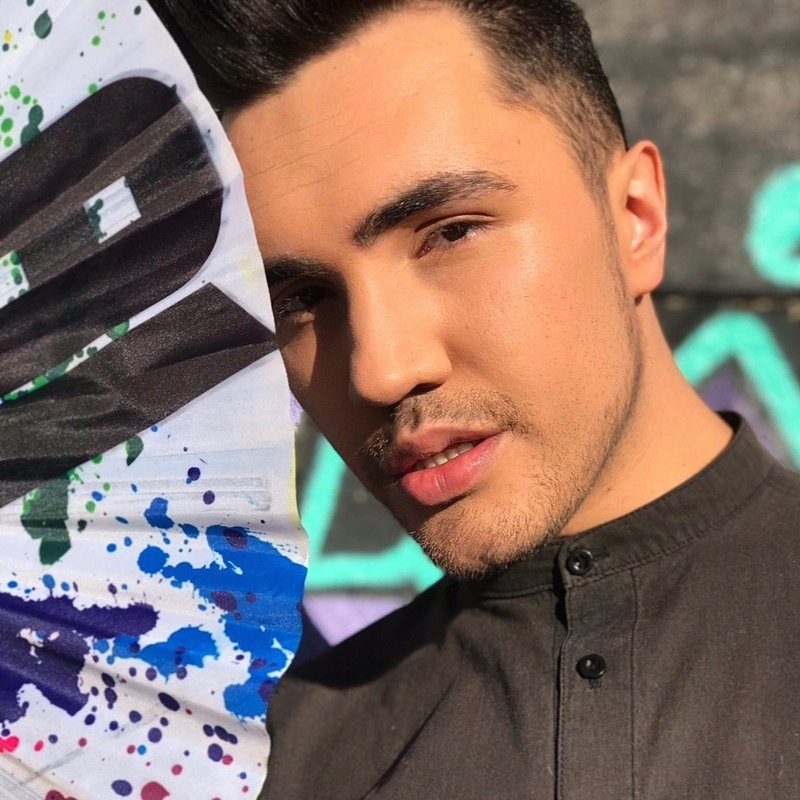

Background information
- Born: 15 July 1995 (age 31)
- Origin: Witbank, Mpumulanga
- Genres: Pop
- Years active: 2016 - present
- Label: Independent
- Website: armandjoubert.com

Armand Joubert (born 21 July 1995) is a South African singer-songwriter and artist. Born and raised in Witbank, Mpumulanga, he started to sing at the age of five. Joubert participated in The Voice South Africa Season 2, where he was a four-chair turner and made it into the Top 32. Joubert released his debut studio album, You're Too Theatrical in August 2019. His second album Flamboyart is scheduled for release in October 2020.

== Early life ==
Armand Joubert was born on 21 July 1995 in Witbank, Mpumulanga. Joubert started to sing at the age of 5 and has been the opening act for Prime Circle, Blackbyrd, Lady Samar, Sho Madjozi, Nicolas Louw and Ray Dylan. Joubert comes from a musical family and his parents have always been supportive of his dream to become a professional singer. He was home schooled from Grade 9 upwards.

== Musical career ==
=== 2017 - 2018: The Voice and Universal Music ===
Joubert auditioned for The Voice season 2 with Into You from Ariana Grande, he was a four-chair turner and made it into the Top 32 on Team Karen. Universal Music South Africa signed Joubert on a single based contract.

Joubert released his first single Should I op 15 September 2017, with Joubert explaining that "My new song, ‘Should I,’ means a lot to me because often people just don't know what it is that they want from you. When you make the conscious decision to give them what you are, who you are and add a little attitude and fierce to your truth, that should always be enough. This song makes me feel – fierce!”

His second single So Gone was released on 23 February 2018, and was describe as a fun and radio friendly track. So Gone reach number 1 on Jacaranda FM for two weeks. Sun Back, Joubert's third single was released on 6 July 2018, and reached number 1 on 5FM's Top10@10.

=== 2018 - present: independence and debut album ===
After parting ways with Universal Music, Joubert released his first independent single Oh Dear on 30 November 2018 with DBLR. This was followed by Burning Fire released on 8 February 2019 and was described as "to have a sensual touch, which tells the story of two people getting to know each other on a personal level". Burning Fire was released exclusively on Jacaranda FM and the music video exclusively on People Magazine.

Joubert's debut studio album You're Too Theatrical was released on 16 Augustus 2019. The album debuted on number 3 on iTunes.

== Artistry ==
=== Influences ===
Joubert has cited Jessie J, Billie Eilish, Troye Sivan, Christina Aguilera and Justin Timberlake as his musical inspiration.

=== Voice ===
Joubert's voice has been described as having a 5 Octave range.

== Discography ==
=== Albums ===
- You're Too Theatrical (2019)
- Flamboyart (2020)

=== Singles ===
- Should I (2017)
- So Gone (2018)
- Sun Back (2018)
- Oh Dear (2018)
- Burning Fire (2019)
- Falling featuring Evida (2019)
- Letting You Go featuring MCK (2020)
- Back to the 80's featuring MCK (2020)
