= Christina Aguilera (album) =

1999 studio album by Christina Aguilera

Studio album by Christina Aguilera
- Released: August 24, 1999
- Recorded: 1998–1999
- Studios: Pacifique Recording Studios (North Hollywood, CA); Enterprise Interactive, Inc. (Burbank, CA); O'Henry Recording Studio (Burbank, CA); Music Grinder Studios (Los Angeles, CA); Conway Recording Studios (Los Angeles, CA); Bananaboat Studios (Burbank, CA); Barking Doctor Recording (Mount Kisco, NY); Eclectic Studios (Los Angeles, CA); Image Recording (Los Angeles, CA); Loft Recording Studios (Bronxville, NY); Royal Tone Studios (North Hollywood, CA); Studio 56 (California)
- Genres: Dance-pop; teen pop
- Length: 46:21
- Label: RCA
- Producers: Johan Åberg; Ron Fair; David Frank; Ron Harris; Robert Hoffman; Khris Kellow; Steve Kipner; Travon Potts; Paul Rein; Guy Roche; Evan Rogers; Carl Sturken; Robin Thicke; Matthew Wilder; Aaron Zigman

Christina Aguilera chronology
| Christina Aguilera (1999) | Mi Reflejo (2000) |

Singles from Christina Aguilera
- 1. "Genie in a Bottle" Released: May 11, 1999; 2. "What a Girl Wants" Released: September 4, 1999; 3. "I Turn to You" Released: March 28, 2000; 4. "Come on Over Baby (All I Want Is You)" Released: July 11, 2000

Christina Aguilera is the debut studio album by American singer Christina Aguilera. It was released on August 24, 1999, by RCA Records. After Aguilera recorded "Reflection", the theme song for the 1998 Disney film Mulan, RCA laid the foundation for the album immediately and started presenting Aguilera with tracks for her debut album, which they originally decided would have a January 1999 release. Primarily a dance-pop and teen pop album, its music incorporates bubblegum pop, R&B, soul, hip-hop, as well as ballads. Contributions to the album's production came from a wide range of producers, including Johan Åberg, David Frank, Ron Fair, Guy Roche, Robin Thicke, Matthew Wilder and Aaron Zigman.

The album received positive reviews, with critics praising Aguilera's vocal performance and technique. It debuted at number one on the US Billboard 200, with first-week sales of 253,000 copies. The album was certified nine times platinum by the Recording Industry Association of America (RIAA), and has sold over nine million copies in the US, and is among the best-selling albums by women. The album remains Aguilera's best-selling album, with sales of over 14 million copies worldwide. Christina Aguilera reached the Top 10 in Canada, New Zealand, Switzerland, Spain, and South Africa. It earned Aguilera the Grammy Award for Best New Artist at the 42nd Annual Grammy Awards.

The album spawned four hit singles; "Genie in a Bottle", "What a Girl Wants" and "Come on Over Baby (All I Want is You)", all topped the US Billboard Hot 100, with the former single also reaching number one in 20 additional countries; while the album's third single "I Turn to You" also reached number three on the Hot 100 chart. Furthermore, Aguilera embarked on her debut headlining concert tour in 2000. The album was later included in the Rock and Roll Hall of Fame and has been credited for catapulting Aguilera's career. In 2024, for the album's 25th anniversary, Aguilera released an extended play, The 25th Anniversary of Christina Aguilera (Spotify Anniversaries Live) with live versions of various songs from the album.

== Background and development ==
In her 1998 interview for the Pittsburgh Post-Gazette, Christina Aguilera noted that her dream "has always been to record an album before I was out of high school". The singer approached record label RCA Records, then had financial difficulties, and was told to contact Disney. After being given the opportunity to record the theme to the 1998 film Mulan named "Reflection" it was reported she had gained a record deal with RCA with Aguilera saying "I landed a record deal simultaneously as I landed the Mulan soundtrack. I had just turned seventeen years old, and during the same week, I just landed both. I recorded the Mulan soundtrack first and then a few months later I was out in L.A. recording the record for about six months". When asked about the song and Aguilera, RCA executive Ron Fair commented,

She is a badass genius for singing. She was put on this earth to sing, and I've worked with a lot of singers. ... When Aguilera met with us, she didn't care that she was auditioning for a record deal; she got into a performance zone that you see in artist much more mature than she is.

After she was asked to hit a musical note required for "Reflection", she thought that the song could be the gateway into an album deal. Aguilera spent hours recording a cover of Whitney Houston's "Run to You", which included the note she was asked to hit. After successfully hitting the note, which she called "the note that changed my life", she was given the opportunity to record the song. To record the song, she flew to Los Angeles for roughly a week. Despite growing increasingly exhausted during the recording sessions, when she heard that a 90-piece orchestra would be arriving to record the instrumental she begged to stay and witness the event. She later called the experience "amazing". Due to the success around the recording of "Reflection", RCA wished for Aguilera to record and release an album by September 1998 to maintain the "hype" surrounding her at that time. The label laid the foundation for the album immediately and started presenting Aguilera with tracks for her debut album, which they later decided would have a January 1999 release. "Reflection" was written and produced by Matthew Wilder and David Zippel, whom later co-wrote "We're a Miracle" with Aguilera (which appeared on the Japanese edition of the album).

== Recording and production ==
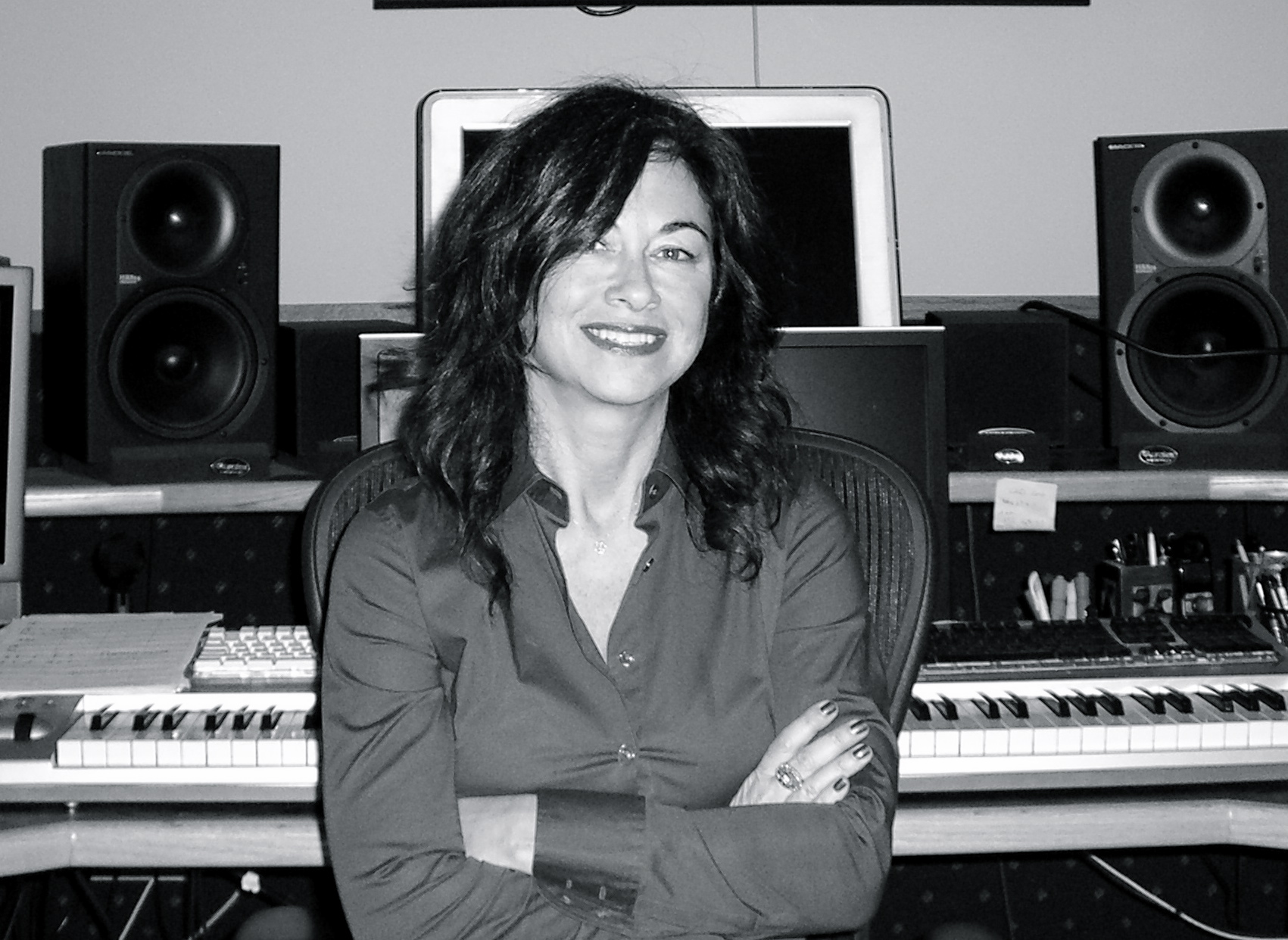
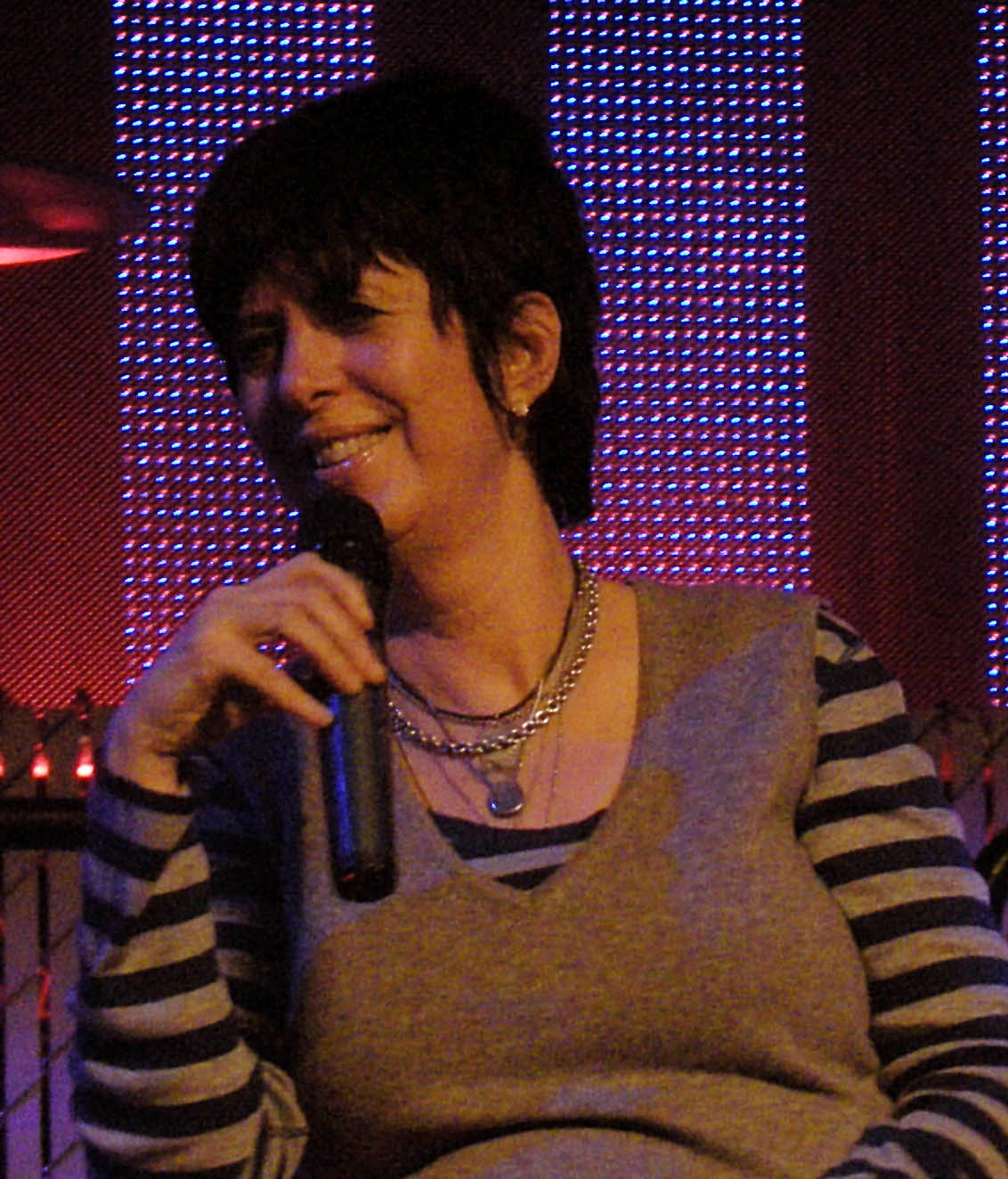
Shelly Peiken (left), co-wrote the hit "What a Girl Wants" and the single version of "Come on Over", while Diane Warren (right) wrote "I Turn to You", a cover of the All-4-One song, which became a hit in Aguilera's voice, and "Somebody's Somebody"

Christina Aguilera was recorded between 1998 and 1999, with Ron Fair serving as the album's executive producer. The label reportedly spent $1 million on writers, producers and voice lessons. According to Fair, "She was very much a raw talent, so building a collection of songs that would become her first album was a time-consuming process. We wanted to find the ones that could knock the door down and put her up there." The album was built around pop songs, which was against Aguilera's will, since she wanted a more R&B album. She further explained during an interview for The Washington Post: "I was held back a lot from doing more R&B ad-libbing. They clearly wanted to make a fresh-sounding young pop record and that's not always the direction I wanted to go in. Sometimes they didn't get it, didn't want to hear me out because of my age, and that was a little bit frustrating. Since all the success, it's a little easier to get my opinions across."

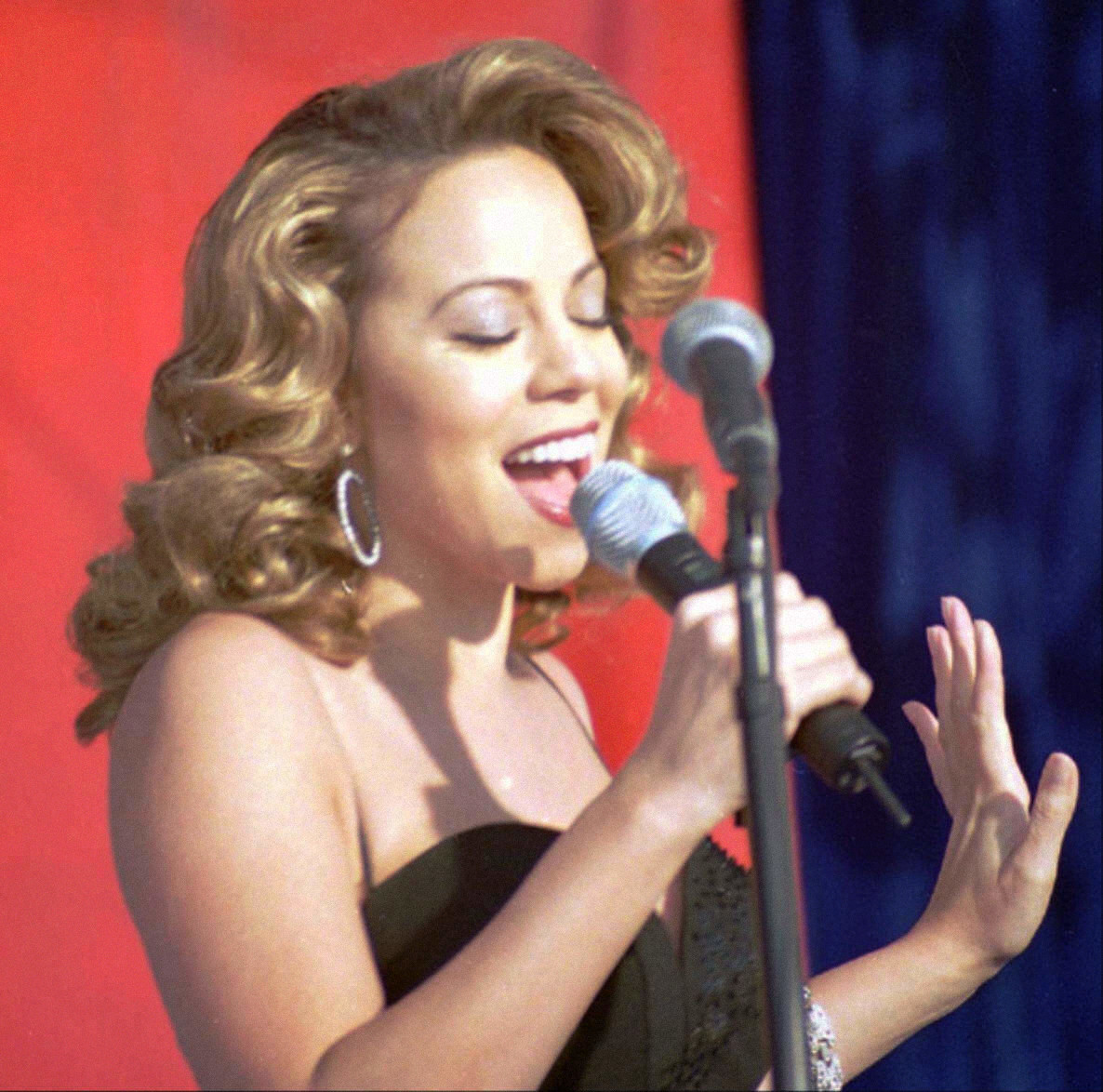
According to the producers, Aguilera was heavily inspired by American singer Mariah Carey (pictured) while recording the album

One of the first producers of the album was Guy Roche, who produced two tracks ("What a Girl Wants" and "I Turn to You") and co-wrote the first one of them, along with Shelly Peiken. "What a Girl Wants" was later re-recorded for its single release, replacing the "lighter" version for a more "funky" R&B version. Peiken also re-wrote with Roche the single version for the track "Come on Over", first produced by Johan Aberg, Paul Rein and Aaron Zigman. According to herself, "We're going to give it more of an edge, R&B it up a little, maybe rock it out a little, give it a lot of different new directions and get it out there." Peiken co-wrote "Don't Make Me Love You", "Too Beautiful for Words", and "Dreamy Eyes", but those songs — though recorded — were scrapped, as the album only had space for twelve tracks. "Too Beautiful for Words" was later released as a B-side on Aguilera's single "What a Girl Wants". "Don't Make Me Love You" appeared on the Japanese edition of the album, and was also used in the soundtrack for Madonna's 2000 film The Next Best Thing. "Dreamy Eyes" only materialized on a promo CD prior to the release of Aguilera's debut album.

Aguilera also recorded a cover of All-4-One's song "I Turn to You", written by Diane Warren who also wrote "Somebody's Somebody". Carl Sturken and Evan Rogers (who would eventually break into the scene as the producers who launched Rihanna's career) wrote and produced two tracks ("Love for All Seasons" and "Love Will Find a Way"), Travon Potts and Brock Walsh wrote and produced "Blessed", while the then up-and-coming Robin Thicke co-wrote and co-produced "When You Put Your Hands on Me". The song has been called a "slinky R&B standout" that "celebrates the alchemy of sex" by Billboard's Kenneth Partridge. In retrospect, Thicke noted: "She [Aguilera] came up to the studio, we did a couple songs, and we just all knew she was going to be a star. We just all knew."

Franne Golde (who previously worked with Whitney Houston) also wrote a song for Aguilera titled "So Emotional", which was originally written for Selena's album Dreaming of You, but she was murdered at the age of 23. The track's producer, Ron Harris, revealed that in-between recordings Aguilera "was only listening to Mariah Carey and Brandy, putting on her Walkman and practicing their riffs and runs, before she did her ad-libs." At the final stages, producer and songwriter David Frank presented a song called "Genie in a Bottle", which Aguilera almost didn't record, "because there were a lot of other artists out there that were after this song, so we had to fight a little bit to get it", she claimed. With Heather Holley, Aguilera also co-wrote along with producers Heather Holley and Rob Hoffman a track called "I Will Be", which she said was inspired by Mariah Carey's "Vanishing". The duo also wrote and produced the album's final track "Obvious", and "I Come Undone", which was ultimately not officially released.

== Music and lyrics ==
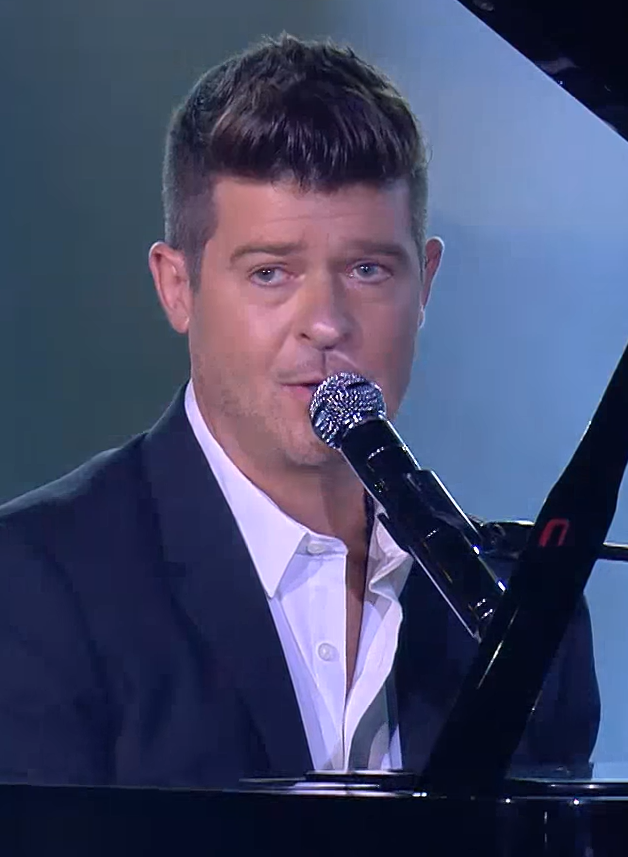
Robin Thicke (pictured) co-wrote "When You Put Your Hands on Me"

Christina Aguilera is a dance-pop and teen pop record, that mainly consists of teen pop songs. Its music also incorporates other genres such as bubblegum pop, R&B, soul, hip-hop and ballads. Beth Johnson of Entertainment Weekly compared the album's musical styles to those of Tiffany and Whitney Houston. Aguilera herself called it "a pop/R&B album, but I have a lot of soul, (...) there's some rangy vocals," adding that it "got everything, from mid-tempos, to up-tempos, to really big ballads."

The record opens with "Genie in a Bottle", which uses sexual references to talk about self-respect. Billboard editor Kenneth Partridge wrote that the song features "32nd-note bass-drum pattern that mimics the heart palpitations of a teenager in lust." "What a Girl Wants" is a hybrid of teen pop and R&B which lyrically "[reveals] an independent, strong woman who knows what she wants from a relationship, both sexually and emotionally." The cover version of All-4-One's ballad "I Turn to You" is a soul-influenced track. On the song, Aguilera thanks someone for their "faith, strength, support, commitment and tenderness".

"So Emotional", "Love for All Seasons" and "Somebody's Somebody" incorporate strong elements of R&B and soul. "So Emotional" is a midtempo gospel-inspired number talking about a man who has got Aguilera "on the ropes". "Love for All Seasons" is a pop track which is musically similar to Carey's "Always Be My Baby" (1996), while "Somebody's Somebody", in which Aguilera sings about being secure in one's arms, features drums snap, bass pops, and a gospel organ in the bridge. Aguilera sings about a woman longing to reveal her true self on "Reflection", which Partridge characterized it as the song that "sums up the album". "Come on Over Baby (All I Want is You)" is deemed the most "sexual" track on Christina Aguilera, a hip-hop-influenced song; the radio mix of the song, released in 2000 as a single, features a rap verse written by Aguilera herself.

"When You Put Your Hands on Me", an R&B song co-written by Robin Thicke, addresses the alchemy of a sexual intercourse: "I just know / when you put your hands on me / I feel sexy / and my body turns to gold." "Blessed" features elements of gospel, while "Love Will Find a Way" features an R&B groove and was compared to Carey's songs "Emotions" (1991) and "Dreamlover" (1993). On the final song, "Obvious", Aguilera wonders whether her confusion about her life is apparent to everyone.

== Release and promotion ==
Christina Aguilera was released on August 24, 1999, in the United States by RCA Records. Aguilera made many appearances on television shows in order to promote the album, such as The Rosie O'Donnell Show and TRL. Additionally, she performed "Genie in a Bottle" at the 1999 Teen Choice Awards. In December 1999, a full-length home video titled Genie Gets Her Wish was released. The video includes interviews with her from backstage, in the studio and on the road, also featuring Aguilera's rendition of Mel Torme's Yuletide classic "The Christmas Song (Chestnuts Roasting on an Open Fire)". Later on, in 2000, Aguilera performed at the Super Bowl XXXIV as a halftime performer. Aguilera also attended the 2000 MTV Video Music Awards, where she and Fred Durst performed together. Aguilera performed "Come on Over Baby (All I Want is You)", wearing a tight ruby red outfit with black and red streaks in her hair, and near the end, Durst walked onstage and performed part of his band Limp Bizkit's song "Livin' It Up" with Aguilera. After eliciting charged reactions from his fans, Durst stated: "I already told you guys before, I did it all for the nookie, man." Aguilera denied Durst's statement, saying Durst "got no nookie". During late 2000, Aguilera traveled to Brazil to promote the album, where she did many interviews and performances on Brazilian television, including Domingão do Faustão, Programa Raul Gil and Planeta Xuxa.

On April 28, 2000, Aguilera announced her first tour, titled Christina Aguilera in Concert, which commenced on July 31, 2000, and went on to visit 37 cities, with a total of 81 shows. The tour was sponsored by Sears and Levi's. Aguilera released a statement about the tour, saying: "Headlining my own tour means creative control and a high-energy, let-loose show. It's designed with my band and dancers to be a visually exciting mix of my big hits and some special surprises", adding: "Plus, my sponsors, Sears and Levi's, are giving fans lots of ways to get involved with the tour, like exclusive CDs and posters, a chance to win a backstage pass to hang with me and a cause-related program called 'Come on Over and Do Something' that was created specifically for the tour." About the tour's setlist, she claimed: "I'll be doing songs from my debut album. But I've changed so much from doing that at 17, so we'll put a whole new twist on things from my album. ... There will be a lot of blues and soul inflections, which is what I've wanted to do more of for a long time." One feature of the shows she described involved getting the crowd excited with her hit "What a Girl Wants" and then switching to a piano-and-vocal-only song by her idol, blues legend Etta James.

In October 2000, the album was reissued as the Special edition, released as a double CD, with the second disc consisting of the dance remixes of the album's first three singles, in addition to the remix of "Genio Atrapado" (the Spanish version of "Genie in a Bottle"), the new song "Don't Make Me Love You", originally released as the album's Japanese bonus track, and the radio remix of "Come on Over Baby (All I Want is You)". The new edition was released with the new cover artwork, which uses a still from the "Come on Over Baby" music video, edited in the same style as the cover art for her follow-up Spanish album, Mi Reflejo, released a month before. In Japan, the reissue was released on a single disc and titled as "Remix Plus" edition, because in this country the new material consists only of remixes, as "Don't Make Me Love You" was already included in Japanese standard edition.

=== 20th anniversary ===
In August 2019, Aguilera announced a re-release of Christina Aguilera in order to commemorate its 20th anniversary. The album was reissued on cassette and picture disc on October 4, while its double-disc reissue had been made available for digital download and streaming on August 23. Furthermore, an orange-colored vinyl edition was released exclusively at Urban Outfitters on August 23.

== Singles ==
"Genie in a Bottle" was the lead single of the album, released on May 11, 1999. The song received generally favorable reviews from music critics, who commended the song for being pleasant, sweet, the album's best moment and her signature track. It became one of Aguilera's highest-charting singles, getting certified platinum by the Recording Industry Association of America (RIAA). The song became Aguilera's first number-one single. It topped Billboard Hot 100 for five consecutive weeks due to strong physical CD sales and airplay, having the longest stay at number one of 1999. The single made airplay history, becoming one of the most successful airplay-only singles and topped the charts weeks before its accompanying music video was made. It also topped the charts in eight countries, while it charted within the top five in every country it was released in. Its music video was a success, becoming a staple on MTV's Total Request Live and featuring Aguilera enjoying some fun and sexual tension at a beach bonfire. The song received a Grammy Award nomination for Best Female Pop Vocal Performance. A version of the song in Spanish, entitled "Genio Atrapado", was recorded and included in some editions of Christina Aguilera and later on her Spanish-language album Mi Reflejo. It peaked at number 13 on the Billboard Hot Latin Songs chart, and received a Latin Grammy Award nomination for Best Female Pop Vocal Performance at the 1st Latin Grammy Awards.

"What a Girl Wants" was released as the second single. Instead of the slower version, Aguilera insisted that a more upbeat mix, with an R&B edge, needed to be created to be released as a single. Released on October 29, 1999, to radio stations, the song received positive reviews from critics, with most praising her vocals on the track, comparing them to those of Mariah Carey and Whitney Houston. "What a Girl Wants" peaked at number one on the Billboard Hot 100 on January 15, 2000, staying atop the chart for two weeks. It ended the chart reign of Santana's "Smooth" and became Aguilera's second number-one single. The single also topped the charts in New Zealand and Spain, while peaking at number three in the United Kingdom, at number five in Australia and reaching the top 20 in most countries it charted in. The song was nominated for Best Female Pop Vocal Performance at the 43rd Annual Grammy Awards held on February 21, 2001. A Spanish version entitled "Una Mujer" was also recorded and included on Mi Reflejo.

"I Turn to You" was serviced to US radio on March 28, 2000, as the third single. It received mixed reviews from critics, who recognized that the track allowed Aguilera's vocals to soar and shine, but called it a cliché ballad. However, the single peaked at number three on the Billboard Hot 100 for four weeks, becoming Aguilera's third consecutive top-three hit. The single also reached the top ten in Canada, the top 20 in other three countries, including the UK, and the top 40 elsewhere. The music video was directed by Joseph Kahn, and features Aguilera singing in front of a microphone before walking in the rain with an umbrella, and on a rooftop. The video's storyline follows a young woman getting into an accident, with her mother worriedly waiting for word on where she is at the late hour. A Spanish version entitled "Por Siempre Tu" was released and included on Mi Reflejo. It peaked at number six on the Hot Latin Songs chart, becoming Aguilera's first top-ten Spanish single.

On May 27, 2000, during an interview with Jam! Canoe's Stephanie McGrath, Aguilera revealed plans to release at least two more singles from her debut–"Come on Over" as soon as "I Turn to You" "runs its toll", and "So Emotional" that fall. "So Emotional" had a simple music video, which was made available through Aguilera's Vevo account in 2009, showing her in a casual outfit recording the song in the studio. However, the song was never released as a single. "Come on Over (All I Want is You)" was chosen as the fourth single. For the song's release, Aguilera claimed: "We're going to head back in the studio, give it more of an edge, R&B it up a little, maybe rock it out a little, give it a lot of different new directions and get it out there." The reworked version, entitled "Come on Over Baby (All I Want is You)", features more hip-hop and dance elements as well as "edgy" and "sexual" lyrics and a rap by Aguilera. It was released on July 11, 2000, as the album's fourth and final single. The song's new version received mixed reviews, with some criticizing the fact that the track "was more like an album track than a hit", but praised the catchy chorus. However, the song was a success on the charts, becoming Aguilera's third number-one hit on the US Billboard Hot 100, spending four weeks at the top, from October 8 to November 4, 2000. It spent 21 weeks on the Billboard Hot 100, was ranked at number 38 on the Billboard Hot 100 year-end chart of 2000, and was certified gold by the RIAA. It was also a success internationally, reaching the top ten in countries including Australia, Canada and the UK. Its music video was considered "bright and colorful", with green, white, and gold backgrounds juxtaposed against a dance choreography. Its Spanish version, entitled "Ven Conmigo (Solamente Tú)", became a number-one hit on the Hot Latin Songs chart, becoming her first Spanish chart-topper.

== Critical reception ==
Professional ratings
Review scores
| Source | Rating |
|---|---|
| AllMusic | 3.5/5 stars |
| Christgau's Consumer Guide | C+ |
| Entertainment Weekly | B− |
| The New York Times | positive |
| Q | 3/5 stars |
| Rolling Stone | 2.5/5 stars |
| Sonicnet | 2.5/5 stars |
| Sputnikmusic | 3.5/5 |

Christina Aguilera received generally positive reviews from music critics. Stephen Thomas Erlewine of AllMusic praised the songwriting and the "clean and uncluttered" production on the project. He eventually commended on Aguilera's vocals, writing that "she not only has charisma, she can actually sing, bringing conviction to these love and heartbreak songs." Although calling it "a frustratingly erratic album", Beth Johnson from Entertainment Weekly wrote that "Christina still makes a credible bid to be the late-summer soundtrack to romantic rebound." Sputnikmusic editor Amanda Murray wrote that Christina Aguilera "is an album that is highly representative of the better aspects of the teen pop movement of the late 90s." Time magazine reporter David E. Thigpen shared a similar sentiment, noting that the album "shows off her [Aguilera's] range", and wrote that the singer's "crystalline" voice, "full of wonderful shadings", "sets her apart in the overhyped teen market". A reviewer writing for Q said the album "shows off her pretty, but powerful vocals to surprisingly impressive effect." Ann Powers on behalf of The New York Times agreed, writing: "Beyond its sleek design, this album hints at a real singer's emergence. She has striking vocal power and range, if not a clue about expressing individuality."

Barry Walters from Rolling Stone criticized the album's theme, calling it "bubble-brained", writing that they "give Aguilera little substance to spin into gold." Robert Christgau said, "like LeAnn and unlike Britney, Christina already has 'adult' grit and phrasing down pat, and so threatens to join Gloria, Mariah, Celine, and LeAnn herself in the endless parade of Diane Warren-fueled divas-by-fiat hitting high notes and signifying less than nothing." Julene Snyder of Sonicnet wrote that "Aguilera has an instinctive grasp of the insipid state of the pop/dance music scene, especially as it relates to her peers." On behalf of PopMatters, Nikki Tranter said "there are lots of 'oohs' and plenty of 'ahhs' and just enough 'I wants' and 'you likes' to keep the kids happy." Partridge deemed the project "quite listenable"; however, he said the lyrics "tell us precious little about the girl on the cover."

=== Accolades ===
Christina Aguilera has also been noted as Aguilera's launch into stardom and has earned her numerous awards and achievements. Aguilera was nominated for two Grammy Awards in 2000 for Best New Artist and Best Female Pop Vocal Performance, the latter being for "Genie in a Bottle". She won the former. Jason Lipshutz of Billboard cited her Grammy win as one of her "10 Biggest Career Moments", describing it as "the battle for teen pop supremacy" as Britney Spears and Christina Aguilera were both nominated for the Best New Artist prize. Aguilera told the audience at the ceremony that she did not have a speech prepared for the event because she didn't think she would win. Aguilera has since taken home four more Grammys, for the songs "Lady Marmalade", "Beautiful", "Ain't No Other Man", and "Say Something" respectively.

Aguilera also received a Grammy nomination in 2001 for "What a Girl Wants" in the "Best Female Pop Vocal Performance" category, and according to Time magazine, "both of which helped catapult the album to the top of the charts". Aguilera's Grammy Award nominations, two back to back number-one singles, magazine gossip, and merchandise released under her name made her the "It girl", according to People.

"Genie in a Bottle", the album's lead single, reached number one and Aguilera became the third female artist in 1999 to top the Hot 100 chart with her debut single, behind Britney Spears' "...Baby One More Time" and Jennifer Lopez's "If You Had My Love". The success of the follow-up single, "What a Girl Wants" solidified Aguilera as a strong musical force and earned her several accolades, including five MTV Video Music Awards nominations. With the album's fourth single, "Come on Over Baby (All I Want is You)", Aguilera managed to have three number-one singles for the same album and four top-ten singles, an achievement she only did with her first album.

Awards and nominations for Christina Aguilera
| Year | Award | Category | Result | Ref. |
|---|---|---|---|---|
| 1999 | Teen Entertainment Awards | Best CD | Won | |
| 1999 | YoungStar Awards | Best Young Recording Artist or Musical Group | Nominated | |
| 2000 | ARTISTdirect Online Music Awards | Favorite "Turn It Up Loud" CD | Nominated | |
| 2000 | Blockbuster Entertainment Awards | Favorite New Female Artist (Note: Aguilera received this accolade for releasing the album Christina Aguilera.) | Won | |
| 2000 | My VH1 Music Awards | Must-Have Album | Nominated | |
| 2000 | Teen Choice Awards | Choice Music: Album | Nominated | |
| 2025 | Webby Awards | Music – General Video & Film (Note: For the 25th anniversary re-recorded version of the album.) | Nominated | |

Rankings for Christina Aguilera
| Year | Publication | Accolade/list | Rank | Ref. |
|---|---|---|---|---|
| 1999 | Digital Dream Door | 100 Greatest Albums from 1999 | 36 | |
| 2000 | Billboard | Top Billboard 200 Albums | 8 | |
| 2000 | Billboard | Top Pop Artists — Female (Note: Aguilera received this accolade for releasing the album Christina Aguilera.) | 1 | |
| 2007 | Rock and Roll Hall of Fame; National Association of Recording Merchandisers | The 200 Definitive Albums in the Rock and Roll Hall of Fame | 127 | |
| 2015 | Billboard | Greatest Albums of All Time | 199 | |

== Commercial performance ==
In the United States, Christina Aguilera debuted at number one on the Billboard 200 with first-week sales of 252,800 copies, beating Puff Daddy's Forever. In its second week, it fell to number two, selling 218,000 copies. The album was certified octuple platinum by the Recording Industry Association of America (RIAA) for exceeding shipments of eight million copies. According to Nielsen SoundScan, the album has sold 8,300,000 copies in the US as of August 2019 and, according to the RIAA, is among the most certified albums of all time. (Note: As of August 2019, Christina Aguilera has sold 8,300,000 copies in the United States. The aforementioned sales figures are combined by Nielsen SoundScan, which does not count albums sold through clubs as does BMG Music Service. According to BMG Music Service, the album has additionally sold 935,000 copies at BMG Music Clubs as of 2003.) Meanwhile, BMG Music calculated that Christina Aguilera has sold an additional 935,000 units through BMG Music Clubs. The album also peaked atop the Canadian Albums Chart. In July 2001, Music Canada certified it sextuple platinum for exceeding sales of over 600,000 units in Canada.

In the United Kingdom, Christina Aguilera debuted at number 21 on October 30, 1999, falling to number 31 the following week. Initially, it stayed inside the top 40 for only two weeks. However, it re-entered the top 40 on February 26, 2000, at number 33, before climbing to number 14 the following week, which became its peak position. The album stayed on the UK Albums Chart for a total of 26 weeks. It was certified platinum by the International Federation of the Phonographic Industry (IFPI) for sales of one million copies in Europe. In Australia, the album debuted at number 31 on February 20, 2000, initially peaking at number 26 two weeks later and exiting the ARIA album chart after 15 weeks. However, it re-entered the chart at number 25 on October 29, and two weeks later reached a new peak of number 21, spending 13 further weeks on the chart, bringing a total to 28. It was later certified platinum by the Australian Recording Industry Association (ARIA) for 70,000 sales in 2000. In New Zealand, the album debuted at number 38 on October 31, 1999, and later climbed to number 27, before re-entering twice: on November 28 and February 13, 2000. After the latter re-entry, the album peaked at number five on March 26. It re-entered six additional times and was certified platinum by the Recorded Music NZ (RMNZ), selling over 15,000 copies. In Brazil, the album sold 80,000 copies within seven months of release. It remains Aguilera's best-selling album with sales of over 14 million copies worldwide.

== Legacy ==
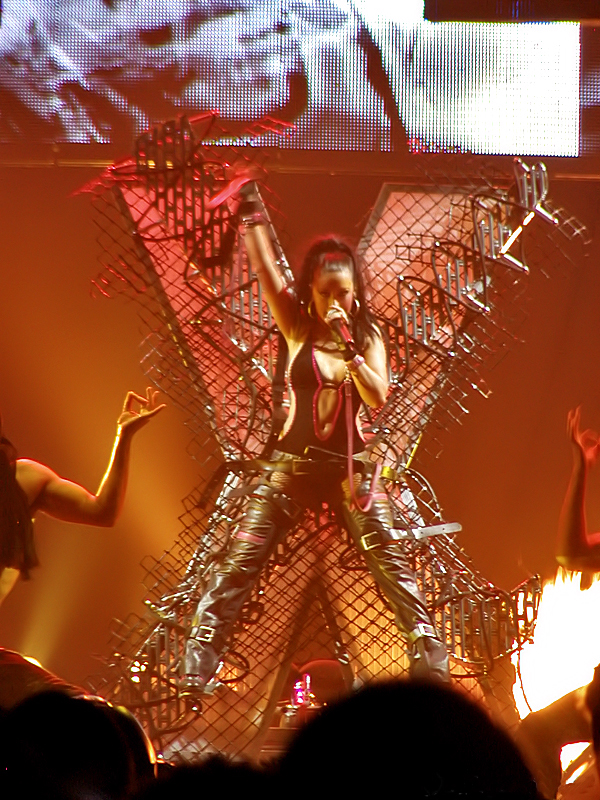
Aguilera (pictured) performing "Genie in a Bottle" on The Stripped Tour in 2003

Christina Aguilera has played an important role on Aguilera's legacy and the entertainment industry. In March 2000, Lori Majewski, entertainment director at Teen People magazine, stated that "If people want to know why Christina is going to be around a decade from now, the answer is very clear: It's pure talent", Majewski said. "When you hear this girl open her mouth, everyone is astounded. I've seen her sing many times, and every time, I'm impressed, but the people who are hearing it for the first time can't even believe it." In an article about the "2013 Most Influential People in the World", in which Aguilera appeared, Canadian singer Celine Dion stated: "I remember she broke onto the scene at the turn of the millennium, ... so I got to watch a lot of her TV appearances, especially on the award shows. I remember thinking, this girl's got it all and then some! Unbelievable voice, great dancer and so very beautiful." The album was included on the List of 200 Definitive Albums in the Rock and Roll Hall of Fame.

The album has been noted to have a "powerful legacy". In 2014, Billboard writer Kenneth Partridge called Aguilera a "soul diva working within record-label constraints" and that while he found that the "teen-queen sold truckloads of records (Christina Aguilera yielded an astounding three number-one singles), in those early years, she struggled to assert her personality". He added that Aguilera would later do this in her follow-up album Stripped. He went on to praise the album saying that it is "a solid set of Top 40 pop songs, and even its deep cuts remain quite listenable". In an interview with Kelly Clarkson, Aguilera herself has stated that "Authenticity is very important to [her] with [her] music". She went on to say that she "always wanted to a be a truth-seeker, and [she] found that that was really important to my fans too".

"Genie in a Bottle" was listed at number 38 on VH1's 100 Greatest Songs of the 90s, About.com placed it at number two on her "Top 10 Songs", while AOL Radio ranked it at number one, calling it her "signature song". While listing the "100 Greatest Singers of All Time", Rolling Stone placed Aguilera at number 52, picking "Genie in a Bottle" as one of her "key tracks", writing that "Even in her teen-pop days, she was modeling her dramatic, melismatic technique on old-school soul heroines like Etta James". The song was also covered by contestants of many popular talent shows such as American Idol, The X Factor and The Voice. "What a Girl Wants" inspired the title of the 2000 romantic comedy film What Women Want, having the track on its soundtrack and on a scene. It also inspired the title of the 2003 comedy film of the same name. American singer Lady Gaga has called Aguilera's cover of "I Turn to You" an inspiration, as she stated: "When I was 15, I was singing 'I Turn to You' at the top of my lungs trying to hit all her notes. So she was an inspiration to me to have a wider vocal range."

== Track listing ==
Standard edition
| No. | Title | Writer(s) | Producer(s) | Length |
|---|---|---|---|---|
| 1. | "Genie in a Bottle" | Steve Kipner; David Frank; Pamela Sheyne | Frank; Kipner | 3:36 |
| 2. | "What a Girl Wants" | Shelly Peiken; Guy Roche | Roche | 3:52 |
| 3. | "I Turn to You" | Diane Warren | Roche | 4:33 |
| 4. | "So Emotional" | Franne Golde; Tom Snow | Ron Harris | 4:00 |
| 5. | "Come On Over (All I Want is You)" | Paul Rein; Johan Aberg | Aaron Zigman; Rein; Aberg | 3:09 |
| 6. | "Reflection" | Matthew Wilder; David Zippel | Wilder | 3:33 |
| 7. | "Love for All Seasons" | Carl Sturken; Evan Rogers | Rogers; Sturken | 3:59 |
| 8. | "Somebody's Somebody" | Warren | Khris Kellow | 5:03 |
| 9. | "When You Put Your Hands on Me" | Robin Thicke; James Gass | Thicke; Pro J. | 3:35 |
| 10. | "Blessed" | Travon Potts; Brock Walsh | Potts | 3:05 |
| 11. | "Love Will Find a Way" | Sturken; Rogers | Rogers; Sturken | 3:56 |
| 12. | "Obvious" | Heather Holley | Robert Hoffman | 4:00 |
| Total length: | | | | 46:21 |

Special edition (disc two)
| No. | Title | Length |
|---|---|---|
| 1. | "Genie in a Bottle" (Flavio vs. Mad Boris Remix) | 6:31 |
| 2. | "What a Girl Wants" (Eddie Arroyo Dance Radio Edit) | 4:05 |
| 3. | "I Turn to You" (Thunderpuss Remix) | 4:21 |
| 4. | "Genio Atrapado" (Remix) | 4:38 |
| 5. | "Don't Make Me Love You" (written by Chapman and Peiken, and produced by Chapman) | 3:53 |
| 6. | "Come on Over Baby (All I Want is You)" (Radio version) | 3:23 |
| Total length: | | 26:37 |

=== Notes ===
- First reissue replaces "What a Girl Wants" with the video version of the track. A large amount of physical copies and reissue pressings do not correctly change the lyrics in the album booklet or time length on the album back cover to represent the video version of "What a Girl Wants" being included instead of the original album version.
- Second reissue in 2000 replaces "Come on Over Baby (All I Want is You)" with the radio version of the track.
- Polish special edition includes the D.U.I. mix of "What a Girl Wants".
- Spanish and Latin American edition include the Spanish version of "Genie in a Bottle" titled "Genio Atrapado".
- Brazilian edition includes additionally the smooth mix of "What a Girl Wants".
- Japanese edition includes the bonus track "We're a Miracle" from the soundtrack album Pokémon: The First Movie and "Don't Make Me Love You".
- Japanese Remix Plus edition includes all the remix tracks from disc two.

== Personnel ==
Credits adapted from the liner notes of Christina Aguilera.

Musicians

- Christina Aguilera – vocals
- Rick Baptiste – horn (5)
- Ali Boudris – guitar (8)
- Sue Ann Carwell – background vocals (3)
- ChakDaddy – horn
- E. Dawk – horn
- Ron Fair – harpsichord (5), keyboards (8), piano (5)
- David Frank – drums (1), keyboards (1)
- John Glaser – Moog synthesizer (3)
- Jerry Goldsmith – conductor (6)
- John Goux – guitar (2, 5)
- Gary Grant – horn (5)
- Robert Hoffman – bass, keyboards (12)
- Heather Holley – piano (12)
- Pro J. - synthesizer, drums, bass, keyboards (9)
- Khris Kellow – keyboards
- Steve Kipner – drums (1), keyboards (1)
- Michael Landau – guitar
- Matt Laug - tambourine (2)
- Anthony Mazza – guitar (4)
- Shelly Peiken – background vocals (2)
- Joel Peskin – horn (5)
- Tim Pierce – guitar (3)
- Travon Potts – multiple instruments (10)
- Paul Rein – keyboards (5)
- Evan Rogers – background vocals (7, 11)
- Carl Sturken – multiple instruments (7, 11)
- Robin Thicke – synthesizer, drums, bass, keyboards (9)
- Michael Thompson – guitar (3)
- Bruce Watson – guitar (2)

Production

- Producers: Johan Aberg (5), David Frank (1), Ron Harris (4), Robert Hoffman (12), Pro J. (9), Khris Kellow (8), Steve Kipner (1), Travon Potts (10), Paul Rein (5), Guy Roche (2-3), Evan Rogers (7, 11), Carl Sturken (7, 11), Robin Thicke (9), Matthew Wilder (6), Aaron Zigman (5)
- Executive producer: Ron Fair, Diane Warren (3, 8)
- Associate producer: Doreen Dorian (8)
- Engineers: Johan Aberg (5), Paul Arnold (1), Ali Boudris (8), David Frank (1), Ryan James Freeland (1), Dan Garcia (10), Ron Harris (4), Mike Hatzinger (4), Al Hemberger (11), Robert Hoffman (12), Phil Kaffel, Steve Kipner (1), Doc Little (4), Mario Luccy (2-3, 8), Michael C. Ross (5), Robin Thicke (9), Aaron Zigman (5)
- Assistant engineers: Tom Bender (3), Joe Brown (10), David Nash (3), Chad Wolfinbarger (8), Terri Wong (12), Christina Aguilera
- Mixing: Rob Chiarelli (4), Jeff Griffin, Mick Guzauski (3), Pro J. (9), Tim Lauber, Peter Mokran (5-7, 10-11), Dave Pensado (8, 9), Robin Thicke (9), Tommy Vicari (12), Dave Way (1-2, 5)
- Mixing assistants: Tony Flores (5-7, 10-11), Jeff Griffin (8-9), Michael Huff (2, 4), Tim Lauber (12)
- Digital editing: Jeff Griffin, Bill Malina (9)
- Mastering: Eddy Schreyer
- A&R: Ron Fair, Elisa Yastic
- Creative director: Jack Rovner
- Programming: Ron Harris (4), Khris Kellow (8), Guy Roche (2-3)
- Drum programming: Johan Aberg (5), Airiq Anest (8), Robert Hoffman (12), Khris Kellow (8), Paul Rein (5)
- Synthesizer programming: Steve Porcaro (12)
- Arrangers: Ron Fair (5), David Frank (1), Khris Kellow (8), Steve Kipner (1), Guy Roche (3), Matthew Wilder (6), Aaron Zigman
- Vocal arrangements: Christina Aguilera (1), Sheree Ford-Payne (10), David Frank (1), Steve Kipner (1), Travon Potts (10), Pam Sheyne (1), Brock Walsh (10)
- Orchestral arrangements: Aaron Zigman (6)

== Charts ==
=== Weekly charts ===
| Chart (1999–2001) | Peak position |
|---|---|
| Australian Albums (ARIA) | 21 |
| Australian Dance Albums (ARIA) | 8 |
| Austrian Albums (Ö3 Austria) | 15 |
| Belgian Albums (Ultratop Flanders) | 19 |
| Canadian Albums (Billboard) | 1 |
| Canadian Top Albums/CDs (RPM) | 2 |
| Chilean Albums (Feria del Disco) | 15 |
| Dutch Albums (Album Top 100) | 21 |
| European Top 100 Albums (Music & Media) | 28 |
| Finnish Albums (Suomen virallinen lista) | 36 |
| French Albums (SNEP) | 44 |
| German Albums (Offizielle Top 100) | 13 |
| Japanese Albums (Oricon) | 20 |
| Mexican Albums (AMPROFON) | 13 |
| New Zealand Albums (RMNZ) | 5 |
| Norwegian Albums (VG-lista) | 28 |
| Polish Albums (ZPAV) | 37 |
| Quebec (ADISQ) | 5 |
| Scottish Albums (Official Charts) | 40 |
| South African Albums (RISA) | 4 |
| Spanish Albums (PROMUSICAE) | 9 |
| Swedish Albums (Sverigetopplistan) | 60 |
| Swiss Albums (Schweizer Hitparade) | 5 |
| UK Albums (Official Charts) | 14 |
| US Billboard 200 | 1 |
| US Top Internet Albums (Billboard) | 2 |

=== Year-end charts ===
| Chart (1999) | Position |
|---|---|
| Canadian Top Albums/CDs (RPM) | 26 |
| US Billboard 200 | 39 |

| Chart (2000) | Position |
|---|---|
| Australian Albums (ARIA) | 44 |
| Belgian Albums (Ultratop Flanders) | 96 |
| Canadian Albums (Nielsen SoundScan) | 17 |
| New Zealand Albums (RMNZ) | 25 |
| South Korean International Albums (MIAK) | 20 |
| UK Albums (OCC) | 88 |
| US Billboard 200 | 8 |

| Chart (2001) | Position |
|---|---|
| US Billboard 200 | 96 |

=== Decade-end charts ===
| Chart (2000–2009) | Position |
|---|---|
| US Billboard 200 | 23 |

=== All-time charts ===
| Chart | Position |
|---|---|
| US Billboard 200 | 199 |
| US Billboard 200 (Women) | 53 |

== Certifications and sales ==
| Region | Certification | Certified units/sales |
|---|---|---|
| Australia (ARIA) | Platinum | 70,000^{^} |
| Brazil (Pro-Música Brasil) | Gold | 100,000^{‡} |
| Canada (Music Canada) | 6× Platinum | 600,000^{^} |
| Italy | — | 100,000 |
| Japan (RIAJ) | Platinum | 200,000^{^} |
| Mexico (AMPROFON) | Platinum | 150,000^{‡} |
| Netherlands (NVPI) | Gold | 50,000^{^} |
| New Zealand (RMNZ) | Platinum | 15,000^{^} |
| South Korea | — | 200,000 |
| Spain (Promusicae) | Platinum | 100,000^{^} |
| Switzerland (IFPI Switzerland) | Gold | 25,000^{^} |
| Taiwan | — | 100,000 |
| United Kingdom (BPI) | Platinum | 300,000^{^} |
| United States (RIAA) | 9× Platinum | 9,235,000 |
Summaries
| Europe (IFPI) | Platinum | 1,000,000^{*} |
| Worldwide | — | 14,000,000 |
^{*} Sales figures based on certification alone.^{^} Shipments figures based on certification alone.^{‡} Sales+streaming figures based on certification alone.

== Release history ==
Release dates and formats for Christina Aguilera
| Region | Date | Edition(s) | Format(s) | Label(s) | Ref. |
|---|---|---|---|---|---|
| United States | August 24, 1999 | Standard | Cassette; CD | RCA | |
| Germany | September 20, 1999 | Standard | CD | BMG | |
| Japan | September 22, 1999 | Standard | CD | BMG | |
| United Kingdom | October 18, 1999 | Standard | Cassette; CD | BMG | |
| Australia | October 16, 2000 | Special | Double CD | BMG | |
| Japan | October 25, 2000 | Remix Plus | CD | BMG | |
| France | January 29, 2001 | Special | Double CD | BMG | |
| United States | September 21, 2017 | Standard | Vinyl (pink) | Legacy | |
| United States | May 25, 2018 | Standard | Vinyl (clear) | Legacy | |
| United States | August 23, 2019 | 20th anniversary | Vinyl (Urban Outfitters exclusive) | RCA; Legacy | |
| Various | August 23, 2019 | Special | Digital download; streaming | RCA; Legacy | |
| Various | October 4, 2019 | 20th anniversary | Cassette; picture disc | RCA; Legacy | |

== See also ==
- Album era
- List of best-selling albums by women
- List of Billboard 200 number-one albums of 1999
- List of number-one albums of 1999 (Canada)
- Teen pop

== Bibliography ==
- Dominguez, Pier (2003). Christina Aguilera – A Star Is Made. Amber Communications Group, Inc. ISBN 1-84449-381-4.
