= Tiana Brown =

American dancer

- Born: July 13, 1981 (age 45); Cedar Rapids, Iowa, USA
- Occupation: Dancer

Tiana Chanel Brown (born July 13, 1981) is an American dancer.

Brown is known for dancing for Christina Aguilera and for being her good friend, and she can be seen in many of Aguilera's videos. Brown has also toured with Aguilera on her Stripped World Tour and the Back to Basics Tour, and she says her favorite song to dance to is "Dirrty".

She has been dancing professionally for seven years and was inspired to pursue a dancing career by the Britney Spears video "(You Drive Me) Crazy" and Janet Jackson's The Velvet Rope World Tour.

Brown is from Cedar Rapids, Iowa. Tiana trained at Dance of Iowa and at Broadway Dance Center in New York. She has done two world tours with Christina Aguilera, and worked with Jennifer Lopez, Britney Spears, Christina Milian, Toni Braxton, The Pussycat Dolls, The Black Eyed Peas, Fergie, and Snoop Dogg. This beauty performed in the Olympics closing ceremonies in Utah and danced the stages on The Ellen DeGeneres Show, The Tonight Shows, Saturday Night Live several award shows.

Tiana stars in ABC’s High School Musical: Get in the Picture as a faculty member, encouraging and helping contestants to make it to the finals.

While on tour, Tiana taught dance to students from 10-20 and also taught with the Universal Dance Association, teaching high school dance teams and preparing them for national competitions. For the last several years, Tiana has returned to the Midwest, producing a workshop for high school dance teams called “Get Down with Tiana Brown”

In her spare time, she likes to watch movies.

Brown has completed touring with Britney Spears' The Circus Starring Britney Spears tour.

== Extras ==
Other artists Brown has danced with are:

- The Game
- Christina Milian
- Toni Braxton
- Outkast
- The Black Eyed Peas
- Paula DeAnda
- Mary Mary
- Fergie
- Kylie Minogue
- Britney Spears

== Filmography ==
- MTV Making The Video (2000 - 20??)
- Stripped Live in the UK (2004)
- Fat Albert (2004)
- Back To Basics: Live And Down Under (2007)
- High School Musical: Get in the Picture (2008)
