= Rob Lewis (music director) =

Musical artist (born 1976)

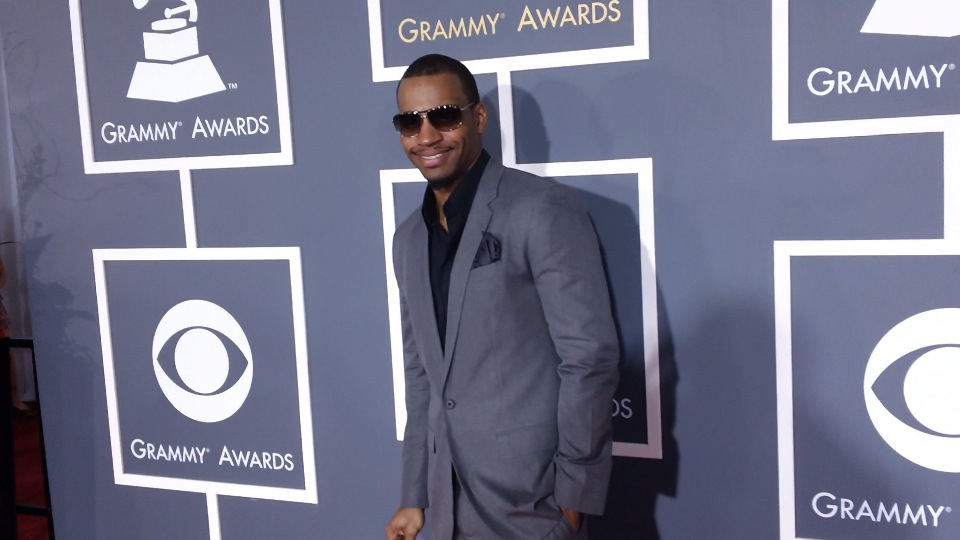

Background information
- Also known as: Young Q
- Born: Robert Lyndel Lewis; March 17, 1976 (age 50)
- Origin: Chicago, Illinois, U.S.
- Genres: Pop; gospel; R&B; jazz; soul; hip hop
- Occupations: Music director; music arranger; record producer; music composer; pianist
- Years active: 1995–present
- Label: 19 in the 4th Entertainment Group

Robert Lyndel Lewis (born March 17, 1976) is an American music director, composer, arranger, producer, and public speaker. Lewis speaks on the role of artificial intelligence in the creative process, delivering a TEDx talk on the subject and has appeared at Google and Microsoft conferences as a speaker.

Lewis has served as music director and arranger for Christina Aguilera (for over 20 years). He collaborated with songwriter and producer Kenny "Babyface" Edmonds (20 years)., as well as music director for New Kids on the Block (10 years), and Toni Braxton (13 years). Lewis' touring and music direction credits include work with Backstreet Boys, TLC, Boyz II Men, 98 Degrees, Fifth Harmony, The Pussycat Dolls, Nicole Scherzinger, Leona Lewis, Jessica Simpson, Brian McKnight, Eric Benet, Deborah Cox, Fantasia, Patti LaBelle, Alicia Keys, and Loren Allred.

Lewis' arrangements and productions have been featured on televised events: the Grammy Awards, American Music Awards, Billboard Music Awards, Dick Clark's New Year's Rockin' Eve, People's Choice Awards, the MTV Video Music Awards. The venues those shows were at, include the Hollywood Bowl with the LA Philharmonic, Radio City Music Hall, Madison Square Garden, the O2 Arena, and Wembley Stadium.

Lewis appeared for three seasons as an on-air personality and music director for the morning show Big Morning Buzz Live with host Nick Lachey on VH1, and has been featured on the reality TV shows Wahlburgers, Donnie Loves Jenny, and Braxton Family Values, He was a vocal coach and judge for two seasons of MTV's Making the Band, and as music supervisor and recurring music producer on the syndicated daytime talk show Steve. He also worked as music supervisor and on-camera music director for Nickelodeon's music competition show America's Most Musical Family.

Lewis has contributed as an arranger and producer to projects by Babyface, Anderson Paak, Mary J. Blige, Dr. Dre, Christina Aguilera, and Diddy. Lewis served as music supervisor and principal arranger for Aguilera's Las Vegas residency show The Xperience, as her principal arranger for her shows at the Hollywood Bowl with the LA Philharmonic, and served as music director for her Liberation Tour. Lewis is also a musician at the Comedy Cellar in Greenwich Village, Manhattan and his work with comedians include his role as musical sidekick and composer on the WNYC podcast "Late Night Whenever" with actress and comedian Michelle Buteau (which Time dubbed as one of the "Best Podcasts of 2018"). and his feature as a musician and composer in the Netflix original special "Bumping Mics" with comedians Jeff Ross and Dave Attell. Additionally, Lewis is a co-writer of Anderson Paak's single "Tints", featuring Kendrick Lamar, from his album Oxnard, produced by Om'Mas Keith and Dr. Dre. In 2023, Lewis performed on the MTV Video Music Awards with Shakira, and performed several shows on the road with Alicia Keys, including two shows headlining the Jingle Bell Ball at the O2 Arena, and at the Formula 1 Grand Prix in Jeddah, Saudi Arabia.

Lewis serves as guest faculty at Carnegie Hall’s social impact program "The B-Side", where he also delivered the keynote address, and was previously honored as an Artist-In-Residence at Berklee College of Music in Boston for five years, where he developed original programming and mentored young musicians across disciplines. In addition to his academic roles, Lewis has spoken at TEDx, Google, Microsoft, and other global platforms about the future of creative collaboration, AI, and artistic empowerment.

== Early life and education ==
Lewis was born on the South Side of Chicago, the youngest child of Anna Lewis, a school teacher, and Robert Samuel Lewis. His mother placed a strong emphasis on education and enrolled him in classical piano lessons at age five with pianist Tom Stevens. Although initially reluctant toward classical music, Lewis discovered jazz during an early lesson. Upon arriving to Stevens' home early one week, Lewis heard Stevens practicing a different style of piano, and when he went upstairs for his lesson, he asked Stevens to show him what he had been playing. That was Lewis' discovery of jazz. The experience sparked his lifelong passion for the piano and for musical exploration across genres. Later in his career, he acknowledged that his objection to classical music at that age was probably because "it had rules, with very little freedom to express anything different than what was written." Lewis' mother extended his lesson time from one half-hour to an hour so he could devote a half-hour on classical, and a half-hour on jazz.

Lewis' musical training was further shaped by his experiences at Christ Way Baptist Church, where he performed regularly under the mentorship of Thomas Alvin Keel, developing a deep connection to gospel music and honing his skills on the church's Steinway & Sons grand piano. At age 10, Lewis began additional studies at the Allen Studio of Music with Lorraine Allen and Ernie Allen Jr., a master Hammond organist. By the age of 12, Lewis was teaching at the studio and leading choirs, gaining early recognition as a young musician in Chicago. Throughout his teenage years, he performed professionally at churches, weddings, and community events, and attended De La Salle Institute in Chicago, where he became the first recipient of a music scholarship to the school. In addition to his work as a pianist and organist, he played drums in the school's jazz band, earning awards and first-place finishes in citywide competitions. Encouraged by his high school band teacher, Larry Pawlowski, Lewis set his sights on having a career in music.

In August 1993, Lewis left Chicago to attend the Berklee College of Music, pursuing a dual major in Music Production and Engineering and Music Business. However, after two years of study, financial pressures forced him to leave Berklee. During his time there, Lewis made a connection with R&B singer Brian McKnight — whom he first met in 1993 when jazz saxophonist Walter Beasley brought McKnight to Berklee for a clinic. Nearly two years later, after impressing McKnight's musical director Jeff Lockhart, Lewis was invited to join McKnight's touring band as a keyboardist—a professional breakthrough which launched Lewis' career. Lewis worked with McKnight as both a touring musician and studio collaborator, ultimately serving as McKnight's music director and learning the art of songwriting, arranging, and vocal production. Lewis often credits this formative experience as the most influential in his development as an arranger and producer, citing McKnight's distinctive writing style and production techniques as key inspirations in his own work.

== Core collaborations and touring ==
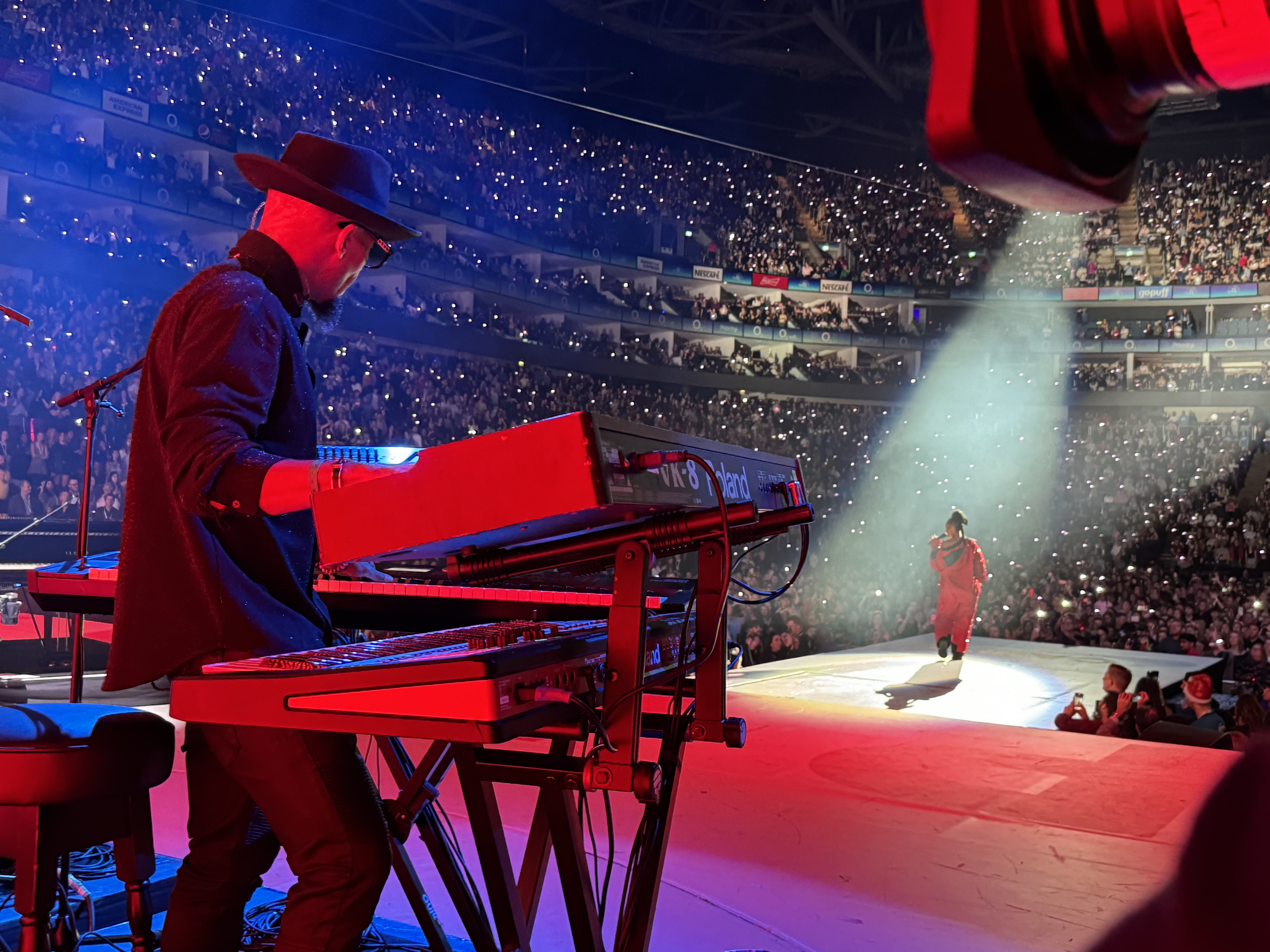
Lewis performing with Alicia Keys at the O2 Arena in London, November 2024

Lewis has produced, written songs, and arranged on several number one albums including Christina Aguilera's Back to Basics, Diddy's Press Play, Fall Out Boy's Infinity on High, Jamie Foxx's Unpredictable, Herbie Hancock's "Possibilities", Heather Headley's Grammy Award winning "Audience of One", and Vanessa Williams' "The Real Thing". Lewis' emotional string and horn arranging has gained him notoriety for his work on Fall Out Boy's single "Thnks fr th Mmrs.", Christina Aguilera's "Oh Mother" and "Understand", Jamie Foxx's "Heaven", Chrisette Michele's "Best of Me" and "Your Joy" (which Lewis also co-wrote with Babyface and Chrisette Michele).

Lewis worked with Toni Braxton for many tours and was the musical director for several Las Vegas artist residencies including "Toni Braxton: Revealed" at the Flamingo Hotel. He also contributed to Vegas productions and residencies for Boyz II Men and Christina Aguilera. He wrote and produced for the gospel group "Here II Praise", who was signed by Daryl Coley and Jenell Alexander Coley through a deal with Verity Records. With their harmonic and artistic capabilities, their album "Giving You Nothing But Praise" debuted on Billboard's Gospel charts in the Top 20 in Sept. 1998, The choir, led by Lewis, won the "Bobby Jones Excellence Award" for "Best Urban Contemporary Choir of the year" at the Gospel Music Workshop of America (GMWA) in 1998, and was nominated for a Stellar Award in 1999. Lewis is a self-taught string arranger, and gospel producer Donald Lawrence employed his arranging on several projects in the late 1990s including Lawrence's Christmas album "Hello Christmas", and for Bishop TD Jakes's "Sacred Love Songs", A few years later, Lawrence introduced singer and producer Tonex to Lewis to do arranging for Tonex's O2 album ("The Beautiful Place" and "Even You"). Along with arranging, he scored songs with film maker/playwright David E. Talbert, who assigned him the moniker "Young Q", referring to Lewis as a "young Quincy Jones" (who Lewis always refers to as the "greatest musical role model".) Lewis has written the scores for Talbert's theatrical plays "Love Makes Things Happen" featuring the music of Babyface, "The Fabric of a Man", "He Say She Say, But What Does God Say", and Lewis wrote the original songs and score for "Love on Layaway" starring Deborah Cox and Cassie Davis. For Talbert's feature film First Sunday, starring Ice Cube and Tracy Morgan, Lewis wrote and produced the song "Live Again" which played during the end credits.

Rob Lewis co-hosting the American Music Awards red carpet pre-show

=== Christina Aguilera ===
Lewis began touring with Christina Aguilera in 2002 after the release of her album Stripped, serving as co-music director under music director Rickey Minor and as music director for her on the Justified/Stripped Tour with Justin Timberlake in 2003. In 2004, Lewis arranged Aguilera's performance of "Beautiful", featuring a 21-piece string orchestra and the Roger Wagner Chorale at the Grammy Awards, the performance preceded Aguilera's Grammy win for Best Female Pop Vocal Performance for "Beautiful".

Lewis contributed to Aguilera's 2006 album Back to Basics as a vocal arranger and producer, string and horn arranger, and co-writer on "Without You" (co-written by Aguilera, Kara DioGuardi, and Mark Ronson), Lewis then was the musical director and arranger for her Back to Basics Tour, documented in the DVD Back to Basics: Live and Down Under. His vocal production work with Aguilera extended to collaborative projects with other artists including Diddy’s first single "Tell Me" from the album Press Play, for Herbie Hancock's album Possibilities (Grammy Award nominee for Best Pop Collaboration with Vocals, for "A Song for You") and Lewis was vocal producer for Aguilera's hit "Ain't No Other Man", which won a Grammy Award for "Best Pop Performance".

Lewis also worked as vocal producer and co-writer on Aguilera's album "Lotus" ("Sing For Me"). He remained her pianist, arranger, and music director for 20-plus years, including almost all of her live performances. Additionally, he arranged Aguilera's 2015 NBA All-Star game New York-inspired opening performance at Madison Square Garden, all of her late night television performances (including SNL, The Tonight Show with Jay Leno, The Tonight Show Starring Jimmy Fallon, Jimmy Kimmel Live!, The Late Show with David Letterman), her Liberation Tour in support of her sixth album, Liberation, served as principal arranger and music supervisor for her Las Vegas residency The Xperience, and for her sold-out Hollywood Bowl shows with the LA Philharmonic.

=== Kenny "Babyface" Edmonds ===
Lewis worked with Kenny "Babyface" Edmonds, as a writer, string arranger, producer, and music director. He started touring with him in 2005, and Edmonds used Lewis as an arranger on albums with Jamie Foxx ("Heaven"), Fall Out Boy ("Thnks Fr Th Mmrs"), and made him an part of his covers album Playlist, Lewis is featured on Edmonds' "Grown and Sexy" DVD. While in Boston for a performance with Edmonds, Lewis brought him to Berklee College of Music in Boston to speak with students, and during the clinic, Edmonds was surprised with the announcement of a new master songwriting course titled "The Music of Kenny "Babyface" Edmonds". Together Lewis and Babyface have written and arranged songs including "Your Joy" with Chrisette Michele for her debut album "I Am", and "Loving You" for Vanessa Williams' 2009 album "The Real Thing"., and Lewis co-produced the music for the song "Heaven" from Jamie Foxx "Unpredictable" album.

In 2023, Lewis arranged the music for Babyface's co-headlining tour with Anita Baker, contributing to the live production and music direction. Later in 2023, Babyface commissioned Lewis to arrange and lead an orchestral performance for his appearance at Kris Jenner and Kim Kardashian's annual private holiday party. Lewis often credits Babyface as being one of the most influential mentors in his career and occasionally steps in as a substitute pianist and arranger on tour.

=== Pop touring work: New Kids on the Block, Backstreet Boys, Boyz II Men, 98 Degrees, TLC ===
Lewis was appointed music director for New Kids on the Block’s reunion tour, collaborating with Donnie Wahlberg. Lewis served as musical director and arranger for multiple NKOTB tours and television appearances, including the NKOTBSB Tour (with Backstreet Boys), The Package Tour (with Boyz II Men and 98 Degrees), The Main Event (2015 concert tour with TLC and Nelly), and the 2017 Total Package Tour (with Paula Abdul and Boyz II Men). Lewis’ longstanding collaboration with Wahlberg has led to on-screen appearances on reality series including Wahlburgers and Donnie Loves Jenny.

=== Sean "Diddy" Combs ===
Christina Aguilera brought Lewis into the studio to work with her to arrange and produce the vocals for Diddy's lead single "Tell Me". Impressed with Lewis’ vocal production skills, Diddy invited him to appear on the series Making the Band. As a vocal coach and producer, Lewis was featured on MTV's Making the Band, Season 3 with Diddy and pop girl group Danity Kane. Diddy also enlisted Lewis to work on most of his album, where Lewis did vocal production for "Come to Me" working with Nicole Scherzinger, "Tell Me", working with Christina Aguilera, "Making It Hard" working with Mary J. Blige, string arranging for "Thought You Said" featuring Brandy, and vocal producer for "Last Night" featuring Keyshia Cole and co-wrote two songs on the album, "Crazy Thang" and "Claim My Place". Lewis was commissioned once again to be on MTV's television series Making the Band where Lewis used his musical directing skills to assist in finding up and coming artists to create Diddy's new band for his forthcoming tour.

=== Television work: VH1’s Big Morning Buzz Live ===
Lewis was an on-air personality, dubbed the "One Man House Band", for the last three seasons of the VH1 television show Big Morning Buzz Live, when 98 Degrees frontman Nick Lachey became the host. The morning show aired on VH1 five days a week and featured celebrity guest interviews, live music performances, and musical skits. Brought in by longtime friend and television director Rik Reinholtsen (The Tonight Show Starring Jimmy Fallon), Lewis was introduced to the show's executive producer Shane Farley.

Lewis' original role on the show was to appear once a week in a segment called the "Remix Rewind"- a segment where Lachey and Lewis would perform a song that would chronicle the highlights of the week, always co-written with writer Devin Delliquanti (of The Daily Show). Farley expanded Lewis' role on the show as the seasons continued, making Lewis an everyday on-camera personality, utilizing his arranging and musicianship for the musical skits and bumpers, conducting interviews, and even gave Lewis a reoccurring segment called "Rob Lewis Presents", where Lewis was able to highlight his own alliance of singers and performers.

== Awards and recognition ==
In September 2007, Lewis was awarded the "Distinguished Alumni Award" from Berklee College of Music recognizing his career accomplishments. In 2022, he was given the "Distinguished Visiting Artist and Producer" award in recognition of his five years as an Artist-In Residence at Berklee, and as a producer of his original series "The Show". Lewis holds Grammy certificates as "Vocal Producer" for Christina Aguilera's "Back To Basics" album (nominated), her lead single from the album "Ain't No Other Man" (winner), and for Aguilera's work on "A Song For You" from Herbie Hancock's "Possibilities" album (nominated).

== Public speaking ==
Lewis publicly speaks on how technology can empower, rather than replace, human creativity. In 2025, he delivered a TEDx talk titled "Ego, Ethics & Evolution: How AI is Redefining Creativity", in which he explored how artificial intelligence can serve as a collaborator in the creative process, while raising questions around influence, control, and artistic identity. He has also serves as guest faculty and keynote speaker for Carnegie Hall’s "The B-Side", a social impact program designed to educate young artists on the evolving music business.

Lewis has been invited to speak at Google and Microsoft events. He has participated in panels and conferences on AI and creativity. He was a featured speaker at Transform, a global conference focused on innovation in business, technology, and culture. He also serves as an advisor and "creative-in-residence" to emerging tech companies working at the intersection of music and artificial intelligence.

== Discography ==
As Producer/arranger:

- Jaheim- "Appreciation Day" (2013)
- Rob Lewis- "The Masterpiece" (2012)
- Naughty By Nature- "Anthem Inc." (2012)
- Rob Lewis- "Brokenhearted" (single) (2009)
- Vanessa Williams- "The Real Thing" (2009) Billboard Top Contemporary Jazz Albums #1
- Heather Headley- "Audience of One" (2009) Billboard Gospel Charts #1
- Kenny "Babyface" Edmonds- "Playlist" (2007) Billboard R&B/Hip Hop Charts #7
- Fall Out Boy- "Infinity On High" (2007) Billboard Top 200 #1
- Jamie Foxx- "Unpredictable" (2007) Billboard Top 200 #1
- Chrisette Michele- "I Am" (2007) Billboard Top R&B/Hip-Hop Albums #5
- Christina Aguilera- "Back to Basics" (2006) Billboard Top 200 #1
- Diddy- "Press Play" (2006) Billboard Top 200 #1
- Herbie Hancock- "Possibilities" (2006) Billboard Top Contemporary Jazz #1
- Here II Praise- "Giving You Nothing But Praise" (1998) Billboard Gospel Charts #20
- Myron- "Destiny" (1998) Billboard R&B/Hip Hop Charts #38
- Donald Lawrence- "Hello Christmas" (1997) Billboard Gospel Charts #7
- Bishop TD Jakes- "Sacred Love Songs" (1997)

As Songwriter:

- Anderson Paak- "Tints" featuring Kendrick Lamar
- Yuna- "Nocturnal" ("Call Everyone", co-written and produced by OmMas Keith)
- Jaheim- "Appreciation Day" (Sexting) (2013)
- Rob Lewis- "The Masterpiece" (entire album) (2012)
- Naughty By Nature- "Anthem Inc." ("Perfect Party", "Doozit")
- Rob Lewis- "Brokenhearted" (single) (2009)
- Vanessa Williams- "The Real Thing" ("Loving You", co-written with Babyface and Carole Bayer Sager) (2009)
- Christina Aguilera- "Back to Basics" ("Without You", co-written with Christina Aguilera, Kara DioGuardi, and Mark Ronson) (2006)
- Chrisette Michele- "I Am" ("Your Joy", co-written with Chrisette Michele and Babyface) (2007)
- Diddy- "Press Play" ("Claim My Place" and "Crazy Thang", co-written with Sean "Diddy" Combs) (2006)
- Here II Praise- "Giving You Nothing But Praise" (1998)

As Vocal arranger/vocal producer:

- Christina Aguilera- "Lotus" (Sing For Me)
- Christina Aguilera- "Back to Basics": Disc One, including "Ain't No Other Man" (Grammy Award winner), "Without You", "Back In The Day", "Oh Mother", "On Our Way" and more
- Herbie Hancock- "A Song For You" (Grammy nominated)
- Diddy- "Press Play"
- "Tell Me" featuring Christina Aguilera
- "Come To Me" featuring Nicole Scherzinger
- "Making It Hard" featuring Mary J. Blige
- 50 Cent- "Curtis"
- "Fire" featuring Scherzinger
- Here II Praise- "Giving You Nothing But Praise": Entire Disc

As performer:

- Anderson Paak- "Tints" featuring Kendrick Lamar (piano)
- Christina Aguilera- "Back to Basics" (bass, guitar)
- Kenny "Babyface" Edmonds- "Playlist" (keys)
- Vanessa Williams- "The Real Thing" (piano)
- Jamie Foxx- "Unpredictable" (piano)
- Chrisette Michele- "I Am" (piano)
- Brian McKnight- "Bethlehem" (Hammond Organ)
- Patti LaBelle- "Classic Moments" (vocals)
- Donald Lawrence- "Hello Christmas" (piano)

Tours:

- Brian McKnight (1995–2000): "Brian McKnight" Tour ('95-'96), "Anytime" Tour ('97-'98), "Back At One" World Tour (2000)
- Jessica Simpson (2001): "Dream Chaser" Tour
- Patti LaBelle (2002–2005)
- Christina Aguilera (2002–present): "Justified/Stripped Tour" Tour (2003), "The Stripped Tour" World Tour (2003), "Back to Basics Tour" World Tour (2006 - 2008), "Liberation Tour" (2018)
- Babyface (2005–2008): "Grown and Sexy" World Tour, "Playlist" World Tour
- New Kids on the Block (2008–2010) "The Block" World Tour
- NKOTBSB (2011–2012) World Tour
- New Kids on the Block (2013) Package Tour with Boyz II Men and 98 Degrees
- New Kids on the Block (2015) The Main Event Tour with TLC and Nelly
- New Kids on the Block (2017) Total Package Tour with Boyz II Men and Paula Abdul
- Christina Aguilera (2018) Liberation Tour with Big Boi
- Toni Braxton (2019) "Long As I Live" Tour with SWV

DVDs:

- Jessica Simpson: "Dream Chaser" (2001)
- Christina Aguilera: "Stripped Live in the U.K." (2003), "Back to Basics: Live and Down Under" (2007):
- Babyface: "Grown and Sexy" (2005)
- New Kids on the Block: "Coming Home" (2009)

As a TV personality:

- VH1 Big Morning Buzz Live with host Nick Lachey
- A&E Donnie Loves Jenny with Donnie Wahlberg
- A&E Wahlburgers with Wahlberg
- WeTV Braxton Family Values with Toni Braxton
- MTV and Diddy presents Making the Band, Season 3 (with Danity Kane) (2006)
- MTV and Diddy presents Making the Band, entire season (2009)

As composer/film composer:

- "First Sunday", starring Ice Cube, Tracy Morgan, and Katt Williams

End credits song: "Live Again" featuring Sasha Allen and Mike Davis; written and produced by Rob Lewis

- "The Seat Filler", starring Kelly Rowland and Duane Martin

Score composed by Rob Lewis; soundtrack written and produced by Rob Lewis, including:

- "Follow Your Destiny" featuring Rowland
- "Lost Without You" featuring Chante Moore
- "I Need a Love", featuring Rowland

Theatrical work:

- With David E. Talbert:
- "Love Makes Things Happen", starring Dawn Robinson and Kevon Edmonds

Featuring the music of Babyface, co-produced by Babyface and Tracey Edmonds; arranged and scored by Rob Lewis

- "Love On Lay-a-way", starring Deborah Cox and Mel Jackson

Music score and original songs written and produced by Rob Lewis

- "He Say, She Say...But What Does God Say", starring Clifton Powell, N'Bushe Wright, and DJ Rogers Jr.

Score written and arranged by Rob Lewis

- "The Fabric of a Man", starring Darren DeWitt Henson

Score written and arranged by Rob Lewis
