= Candyman (Christina Aguilera song) =

2007 single by Christina Aguilera

Single by Christina Aguilera

from the album Back to Basics
- Released: February 20, 2007
- Studio: Kung Fu Gardens (North Hollywood, California)
- Genre: Pop; jazz; blues
- Length: 3:14
- Label: RCA
- Songwriters: Christina Aguilera; Linda Perry
- Producer: Linda Perry

Christina Aguilera singles chronology
| "Tell Me" (2006) | "Candyman" (2007) | "Slow Down Baby" (2007) |

Music video
- "Candyman" on YouTube

"Candyman" is a song written and performed by American singer Christina Aguilera from the second disc of her fifth studio album, Back to Basics (2006). "Candyman" was planned to be released as the second single from Back to Basics; however, RCA Records decided to release "Hurt" instead. Subsequently, the track was released on February 20, 2007, as the third single from the album. "Candyman" is described as a pop and jazz song that imitates swing music whose lyrics are about sex.

"Candyman" received mostly positive reviews for its musical style while some criticized the sexual references. Commercially, the single peaked within the top 10 in Australia, Canada, Croatia, Hungary, Italy, Luxembourg, New Zealand and Romania, as well as the top 20 in Austria, Belgium, Denmark, Germany, Ireland, the Netherlands, Switzerland, and the United Kingdom. In the United States, it peaked at number 25 on the Billboard Hot 100 chart and was certified platinum by the Recording Industry Association of America for selling one million copies in the country. "Candyman" is also certified gold and platinum in more countries.

A music video for the song was co-directed by Aguilera and Matthew Rolston. The video received an MTV Video Music Award nomination for Best Direction at the 2007 award ceremony. The single achieved a Grammy Award nomination for Best Female Pop Vocal Performance at the 2008 ceremony. The song was on the setlist of Aguilera's Back to Basics Tour (2006–2008) and has been covered by Alexandra Burke and the Glee cast.

== Music and lyrics ==
"Candyman" (2007)
A 20-second sample of "Candyman", which is described as a pop song that imitates swing

"Candyman" was described as a pop song by Leah Greenblatt from Entertainment Weekly; Stylus Magazine's Thomas Inskeep opined that it imitated swing music, while Joan Anderman from The Boston Globe commented that Perry and Aguilera attempted to modernize early 20th century pop and blues "only to end up imitating the Andrews Sisters," and Slant Magazine's Sal Cinquemani characterized the song as standard jazz and blues. "Candyman" is composed on the key of E major. The song has a moderate tempo of 172 beats per minute. Aguilera's vocals on the song span two octaves from the low-note of G_{3} to the high-note of G_{5}. The song opens and concludes with the lyrics, "Tarzan and Jane were swingin' on a vine / Sippin' from a bottle of vodka double-wine", which was credited as a sample used from "Tarzan & Jane Swingin' on a Vine" from the 1998 album Run To Cadence With U.S. Marines. Lyrically, "Candyman" talks about sex; Jenny Eliscu for Rolling Stone quoted the lyrics "He's a one-stop shop / Makes the panties drop" and deemed it "nasty". Sputnikmusic's Amanda Murray described its lyrics as "dumb and cheekily vulgar".

Jim McMillen played the trombone, while Ray Herrmann and Glen Berger played the saxophone, and Chris Tedesco played the trumpet. Linda Perry played the piano, mellotron, bass, and also served as the musical director. Nathan Wetherington played the drums. According to Aguilera and Perry, the song was a tribute to the Andrews Sisters' song, "Boogie Woogie Bugle Boy".

== Release ==
"Candyman" was planned to be released as the second single from Back to Basics in late 2006. In July 2006, Aguilera told Seventeen that "Candyman" would be released as the follow-up single to "Ain't No Other Man". However, RCA Records chose "Hurt" to be released as the second single off the album; therefore, "Candyman" was released as the third. The song was sent to contemporary hit and urban contemporary radio stations in the United States on February 27, 2007. In Germany, the single was released for digital download on April 6, 2007. One day later, "Candyman" was released as a CD single in France and Germany. On April 10, the song was available as a CD in the United States. A digital EP was released via iTunes Stores in European countries consisting of Belgium, France, Germany, Spain, and Sweden. On the same day, the digital version of "Candyman" was released in France. It was also available as a maxi single there on September 1, 2007. In the United States, a remix EP was released digitally on May 1, 2007. The song was featured in a heavily played ad for the LG Chocolate phone from Verizon Wireless in the United States.

== Critical reception ==
Billboard called the single "raunchy" and praised Aguilera's vocals, saying that "few popular vocalists could pull off such a laudable feat." Sputnikmusic's Amanda Murray deemed the song as "fun" and reminiscent of the Spice Girls' "The Lady Is a Vamp" from Spiceworld (1997). Sean Daly from Tampa Bay Times complimented Aguilera's vocals and its "X-rated lyrics". Pittsburgh Post-Gazette's Scott Mervis labelled it "the swingiest single since Brian Setzer jumped, jived and wailed," while Yahoo! Music critic Dan Gennoe called "Candyman" "a good-time 1940s big band romp", and Leah Greenblatt from Entertainment Weekly cited it as one of the few "pop-song highs" in Aguilera's career.

AllMusic's Stephen Thomas Erlewine selected "Candyman" as one of the two outstanding songs on the second disc of Back to Basics, alongside "Mercy on Me". Lucy Davis for BBC Music was negative towards the song, writing that it "successfully turns the volume and intensity down from 11 to somewhere like 5." Jenny Eliscu from Rolling Stone criticized "Candyman" as "a dead rip-off" of the Andrews Sisters' "Boogie Woogie Bugle Boy" release from 1941. A reviewer from The Guardian disapproved of the "awful creation" and wrote that "the jollier she sounds, the more terrifying it becomes." Christopher Rosa from The Celebrity Cafe ranked it at number three on his list of Aguilera's ten best songs ever, calling it "fifty percent flirty, fifty percent dirty, and one hundred percent fabulous". "Candyman" received a Grammy Award nomination for Best Female Pop Vocal Performance at the 2008 Grammy Awards.

== Chart performance ==
In the United States, "Candyman" debuted at number 99 on the Billboard Hot 100 chart on January 20, 2007. It peaked at number 25 on the chart, becoming Aguilera's fourteenth top 40 single on the Hot 100. On the Pop Songs chart, the single peaked at number 23 and remained there for a total of seven weeks. "Candyman" also peaked at number 18 on the Hot Dance Club Songs chart and stayed there ten weeks. It has been certified platinum by the Recording Industry Association of America (RIAA) for selling more than 1,000,000 units in the United States. As of August 2014, Nielsen SoundScan has reported that "Candyman" has sold in the United States 1,153,000 copies. In Canada, the single peaked at number nine on the Canadian Hot 100 and was certified gold.

In the United Kingdom, "Candyman" peaked at number 17 on the UK Singles Chart and remained within the top 75 for 20 weeks. Throughout Europe, the single attained the top 25 of most countries, peaking at number 11 in Belgium (Flanders) and Switzerland; number 12 in Denmark, Germany, Ireland and the Netherlands; number 13 in Belgium (Wallonia); number 14 in Austria; and number 24 in Sweden. In Denmark, the single achieved gold certification by IFPI Denmark. "Candyman" was a commercial hit in Oceania. The single peaked at number two in both Australia and New Zealand. In Australia, the song remained in the top ten for 15 weeks and earned platinum certification by the Australian Recording Industry Association (ARIA). In New Zealand, the single also achieved gold certification by the Recording Industry Association of New Zealand (RIANZ).

== Music video ==
The three versions of Aguilera, as seen in the music video, which MTV described as a tribute to the Andrews Sisters.

The music video for "Candyman" was filmed on January 28, 2007, in an airport hangar in Southern California. It was co-directed by Aguilera and Matthew Rolston. The video is based on the 1940s World War II theme. In most of the music video, she dances and sings in three different hair colors: red, blonde and brown, as if she were in a singing trio, a tribute to the Andrews Sisters. The audience is mostly composed of men in military uniforms, many of whom are singing and dancing. In other shots she appears as the famous biceps-flexing factory worker from Westinghouse's "We Can Do It!" poster and as actresses Judy Garland, Betty Grable and Rita Hayworth. The video also features product placement for Campari. Benji Schwimmer, 2006 winner of the American dancing competition So You Think You Can Dance, makes a cameo appearance as Aguilera's GI dance partner. Benji's sister Lacey Schwimmer also appears in the video as a jitterbugger. Aguilera asked Rolston to co-direct the video with her after he worked with her for a photo shoot for the cover of Rolling Stone. Shooting the sequences of Aguilera as a singing trio took the longest since they had to be shot for each hair color and camera angle, which was computer-controlled for precision. Choreography was carefully arranged so that none of the versions overlapped and the takes could be spliced together. The clip's color scheme is based on Technicolor films, focusing on primary colors and bright secondary colors.

Sal Cinquemani for Slant Magazine praised it as the best video for a song from Back to Basics. John Montgomery for MTV News commented on Aguilera's "bad girl" image, writing "though Aguilera's mostly going for glam here, she's also plenty bad, too, swinging her way into some servicemen's heart, coyly sipping on a milkshake and shaking it so hard your even your grandpa had to notice." The video brought Aguilera and Rolston an MTV Video Music Award nomination for Best Direction at the 2007 MTV Video Music Awards, but lost to Justin Timberlake's "What Goes Around... Comes Around". The video received a Vevo Certified Award on YouTube for over 100 million views.

== Live performances ==
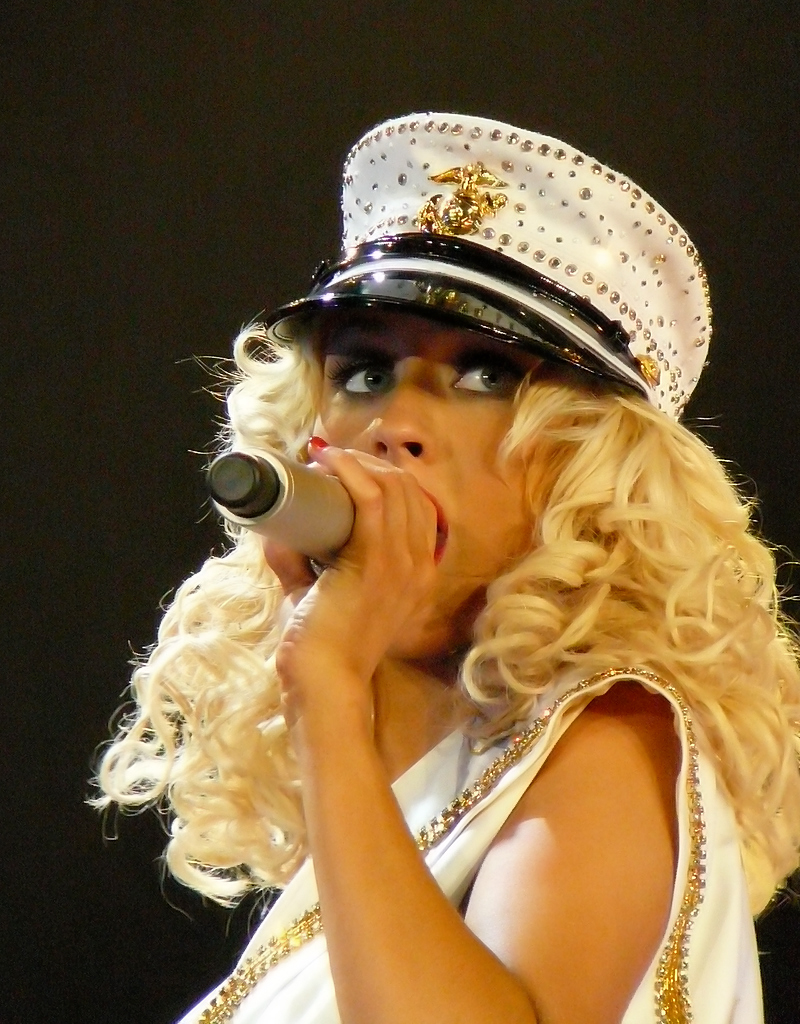
Aguilera performing "Candyman" on her Back to Basics Tour in 2006

Aguilera first performed "Candyman" during a concert held in front of 1,500 fans and invited guests in London on July 20, 2006. The 40-minute concert comprised songs from the then-upcoming Back to Basics and other songs, including "Lady Marmalade" (2001) and "Beautiful" (2002). MTV UK wrote, "The gig reflected the jazz club mood of Christina's new album, with a swinging brass-heavy backing band and fit dancers bounding sexily around the stage". On September 8, 2006, Aguilera performed "Candyman" at Fashion Rocks in a white sailor suit with cap. The performance included photos of jazz standard artists that appeared on the backdrop. She also performed "Candyman" on Dick Clark's New Year's Rockin' Eve on December 31, 2006, and at the halftime show of the 2007 NBA All-Star Game.

In February 2007, Aguilera promoted the single on The Tonight Show with Jay Leno and on The Ellen DeGeneres Show. In June 2007, the singer performed "Candyman" at the Muz-TV Awards. The song was included on the setlist of Aguilera's worldwide Back to Basics Tour. The recording of the performance was included on the video release Back to Basics: Live and Down Under (2008). Aguilera performed "Candyman" again on The Tonight Show in 2013, in military-styled suits in efforts to honor the US troops.

== Legacy ==
A cover of "Candyman" by Alexandra Burke was released as a B-side on her 2008 single "Hallelujah". In 2011, the song was performed by Amber Riley (Mercedes Jones), Naya Rivera (Santana Lopez) and Heather Morris (Brittany Pierce) in "Pot o' Gold", an episode on the third season of the American TV series Glee. The version was well received by critics, some of whom deemed it as the best song of the episode. The Glee version peaked at number 158 on the UK Singles Chart on November 12, 2011. In January 2018, Taye Diggs gave a rendition of "Candyman" during the Aguilera-themed episode on Lip Sync Battle. Violeta Tarasovienė covered the song in the Lithuanian edition of an interactive talent show Your Face Sounds Familiar; Melina Makri sang "Candyman" in the Greek version, and Agnieszka Twardowska covered it in the Polish edition of the show. Olympic figure skaters Evgenia Tarasova and Vladimir Morozov danced to Aguilera's songs "Candyman" and "Nasty Naughty Boy" during the 2018 European Figure Skating Championships.

== Track listings and formats ==
Digital download

1. "Candyman" – 3:14

CD single

1. "Candyman" – 3:14
2. "Hurt" (Snowflake Mix) – 4:05

France maxi single

1. "Candyman" – 3:14
2. "Hurt" (Snowflake Radio Mix) – 4:05

Digital download EP

1. "Candyman" – 3:13
2. "Candyman" (call-out hook) – 0:11

Digital remix EP

1. "Candyman" (Offer Nissim Club Mix) – 8:27
2. "Candyman" (Ultimix Mixshow) – 4:23
3. "Candyman" (RedOne Mix) – 3:19

== Credits and personnel ==
Credits are adapted from the liner notes of Back to Basics.

Sampling credits

- Contains a sample from "Tarzan & Jane Swingin' on a Vine" from Run To Cadence With U.S. Marines.

Personnel

- Christina Aguilera – vocals, background vocals, songwriting
- Jim McMillen – trombone
- Linda Perry – producing, songwriting, directing, piano, mellotron, bass
- Chris Tedesco – trumpet, horn contractor
- Ray Herrmann – saxophone
- Glen Berger – saxophone
- Nathan Wetherington – drums
- Marc Jameson – programming

== Charts ==
=== Weekly charts ===
Weekly chart performance for "Candyman"
| Chart (2006–2007) | Peak position |
|---|---|
| Australia (ARIA) | 2 |
| Austria (Ö3 Austria Top 40) | 14 |
| Belgium (Ultratop 50 Flanders) | 11 |
| Belgium (Ultratop 50 Wallonia) | 13 |
| Canada Hot 100 (Billboard) | 9 |
| Canada CHR/Top 40 (Billboard) | 14 |
| Canada Hot AC (Billboard) | 6 |
| CIS Airplay (TopHit) | 145 |
| Croatia International (HRT) | 3 |
| Czech Republic Airplay (ČNS IFPI) | 80 |
| Denmark (Tracklisten) | 12 |
| Europe (Eurochart Hot 100) | 17 |
| Germany (GfK) | 11 |
| Global Dance Tracks (Billboard) | 38 |
| Hungary (Dance Top 40) | 21 |
| Hungary (Rádiós Top 40) | 3 |
| Ireland (IRMA) | 12 |
| Italy (FIMI) | 8 |
| Lithuania (EHR) | 1 |
| Luxembourg Airplay (RTL Télé Lëtzebuerg) | 3 |
| New Zealand (Recorded Music NZ) | 2 |
| Netherlands (Dutch Top 40) | 12 |
| Netherlands (Single Top 100) | 13 |
| Romania (Romanian Top 100) | 9 |
| Russia Airplay (TopHit) | 140 |
| Slovakia Airplay (ČNS IFPI) | 45 |
| Sweden (Sverigetopplistan) | 24 |
| Switzerland (Schweizer Hitparade) | 11 |
| UK Singles (OCC) | 17 |
| UK Download Chart (OCC) | 13 |
| Ukraine Airplay (TopHit) | 93 |
| US Billboard Hot 100 | 25 |
| US Dance Club Songs (Billboard) | 18 |
| US Pop Airplay (Billboard) | 23 |

=== Year-end charts ===
Year-end chart performance for "Candyman"
| Chart (2007) | Position |
|---|---|
| Australia (ARIA) | 8 |
| Austria (Ö3 Austria Top 40) | 73 |
| Europe (Eurochart Hot 100) | 95 |
| Germany (Media Control GfK) | 92 |
| Hungary (Dance Top 40) | 74 |
| Hungary (Rádiós Top 40) | 14 |
| Netherlands (Single Top 100) | 78 |
| New Zealand (RIANZ) | 15 |
| Romania (Romanian Top 100) | 41 |
| Switzerland (Schweizer Hitparade) | 46 |
| UK Singles (OCC) | 74 |

== Certifications and sales ==
Certifications and sales for "Candyman"
| Region | Certification | Certified units/sales |
|---|---|---|
| Australia (ARIA) | Platinum | 70,000^{^} |
| Belgium (BRMA) | Gold | 25,000^{*} |
| Canada (Music Canada) | Gold | 20,000^{*} |
| Denmark (IFPI Danmark) | Gold | 7,500^{^} |
| Italy | — | 55,000 |
| Mexico (AMPROFON) | Platinum+Gold | 90,000^{‡} |
| New Zealand (RMNZ) | Platinum | 15,000^{*} |
| United Kingdom (BPI) | Platinum | 600,000^{‡} |
| United States (RIAA) | Platinum | 1,153,000 |
^{*} Sales figures based on certification alone.^{^} Shipments figures based on certification alone.^{‡} Sales+streaming figures based on certification alone.

== Release history ==
Release date and formats for "Candyman"
| Region | Date | Format(s) | Label(s) | Ref. |
|---|---|---|---|---|
| United States | February 20, 2007 | Contemporary hit radio; urban contemporary | RCA | |
| Germany | April 6, 2007 | Digital download | Sony BMG | |
| France | April 7, 2007 | CD | Jive | |
| Germany | April 7, 2007 | CD | Sony BMG | |
| Belgium | April 10, 2007 | Digital download (EP) | Sony BMG | |
| France | April 10, 2007 | Digital download; digital download (EP) | Jive | |
| Germany | April 10, 2007 | Digital download (EP) | Sony BMG | |
| Spain | April 10, 2007 | Digital download (EP) | Sony BMG | |
| Sweden | April 10, 2007 | Digital download (EP) | Sony BMG | |
| United States | April 10, 2007 | CD | RCA | |
| United States | May 1, 2007 | Digital download (remixes) | RCA | |
| France | September 1, 2007 | Maxi | Jive | |
