= Back to Basics Tour =

2006–2008 concert tour by Christina Aguilera

- Tour by Christina Aguilera
- Location: Asia; Australia; Europe; North America
- Associated album: Back to Basics
- Start date: November 17, 2006
- End date: October 24, 2008
- No. of shows: 82
- Box office: US$48.2 million (Note: Based on 63 reported shows.)

Christina Aguilera concert chronology
- The Stripped Tour (2003); Back to Basics Tour (2006–08); The Liberation Tour (2018)

The Back to Basics Tour was the fourth concert tour and third world tour by the American singer Christina Aguilera. It commenced on November 17, 2006, at Hallam FM Arena in Sheffield, England, and concluded on October 24, 2008, at Emirates Palace in Abu Dhabi, United Arab Emirates, consisting of 82 shows. Aguilera announced announced the tour in September 2006, following the release of her fifth studio album, Back to Basics (2006).

The concert was divided into four acts: 1920s, which displayed elements of R&B, funk, rock, and hip hop, Duke Joint, during which Aguilera performed in a red bodysuit, Circus, which employed the circus as the main theme, and the encore. The show was modified for concerts in Abu Dhabi to be shorter, with the Encore cut, due to its complexity with choreography and costume changes. The tour received positive reviews from music critics, some of whom were positive towards Aguilera's vocal performance and the show's background visuals, while some others approved the set list, opining that the songs matched perfectly with each other.

The European leg of the Back to Basics Tour gained a large amount of commercial gross, with two sold-out shows in Dublin and Birmingham. The North American leg in 2007 grossed a total of US$28.9 million and sold 391,428 tickets. Overall, it became the highest-grossing concert tour by a female artist of the year, grossing US$48,173,773 and sold 907,568 tickets.. At the 2007 Billboard Touring Awards, the tour received two nominations for Breakthrough Act and Top Package. A video album, Back to Basics: Live and Down Under, which features the show at the Adelaide Entertainment Centre, was released in 2008.

== Background and development ==
Christina Aguilera released her fifth studio album Back to Basics in August 2006. She described it as an album utilizing elements of 1920s and 1940s jazz, soul, and blues, reinterpreted "with a modern twist". The album achieved commercial success, debuting at number one in thirteen countries, including the Billboard 200 in the United States. Following the album's release, Aguilera considered launching a tour of small clubs like New York City's Blue Note Jazz Club. "I think there is something really special about doing a performance like that and feeling the energy of a more intimate audience, and that is something we are definitely, definitely going to entertain in the future", she stated. However, Aguilera considered that it is "a more vulnerable approach for your performance. You can't hide behind anything. It's just you, and your audience is right in front of you, but I still love it. I love to perform more than anything else in the world, being on that stage and feeling the energy of the crowd enjoying your music". She later expressed that an arena tour would give her more time to work the bigger show and then strip it down to something raw and organic. Before the tour's launching, Aguilera stated that it was her my most inspired show to date. "[Expect] lots of amazing circus elements and throwback elements to the past and the areas that I am inspired by. It's just an interesting show to watch and to be a part of and to use your imagination", she said.

In September 2006, concerts in Europe were announced. The following month, additional dates for the United States and Canada were announced, with the Pussycat Dolls and Danity Kane named as supporting acts. Aguilera cancelled four concerts in 2007 due to illness. Two concerts in Melbourne, Australia, were cancelled in June. That July, Aguilera announced the cancellation of the tour's final two shows in Auckland, New Zealand, for that August. In a statement, she expressed her disappointment at being unable to perform and thanked her fans for their continued support.

=== Production ===
The stage production featured extensive technical and visual elements, including more than 600 moving lights and approximately 820 pounds of confetti. Choreographer Jamie King served as the tour's director. He oversaw a performance team of around twenty members, including dancers who underwent specialized training in skills such as stilt-walking, trapeze work, and fire performance to incorporate the show's circus-inspired sequences. Fashion designer Roberto Cavalli created ten custom costumes for Aguilera, each reflecting a vintage aesthetic that referenced figures such as Marlene Dietrich and styles ranging from 1940s glamour to 1960s swimwear silhouettes.

== Concert synopsis ==
The show was divided into four sections: 1920s, Duke Joint, Circus and the encore, and lasted for 90 minutes. Performances in the 1920s section showcased elements of traditional rhythm and blues, funk, rock, and hip hop. Following a video introduction of "Intro (Back to Basics)", Aguilera appeared onstage and performed "Ain't No Other Man" with eight back-up dancers dressed in sharp white suits. Subsequently, she performed "Back in the Day" as images of classic jazz and soul artists including John Coltrane, Marvin Gaye, and Louis Armstrong appeared on the backdrop. Following that, she performed "Understand" in a mini-dress with long train, and a salsa version of "Come On Over Baby (All I Want Is You)", which featured a reggae beat. For the follow-up performance of "Slow Down Baby", Aguilera appeared in a white bodysuit; afterwards, she put on black lace thigh-highs and performed "Still Dirrty" featuring excerpts from "Can't Hold Us Down" as newspapers headlines such as "Christina goes from 'dirrty' to demure" and "Christina cleans up her act" were shown on screens.

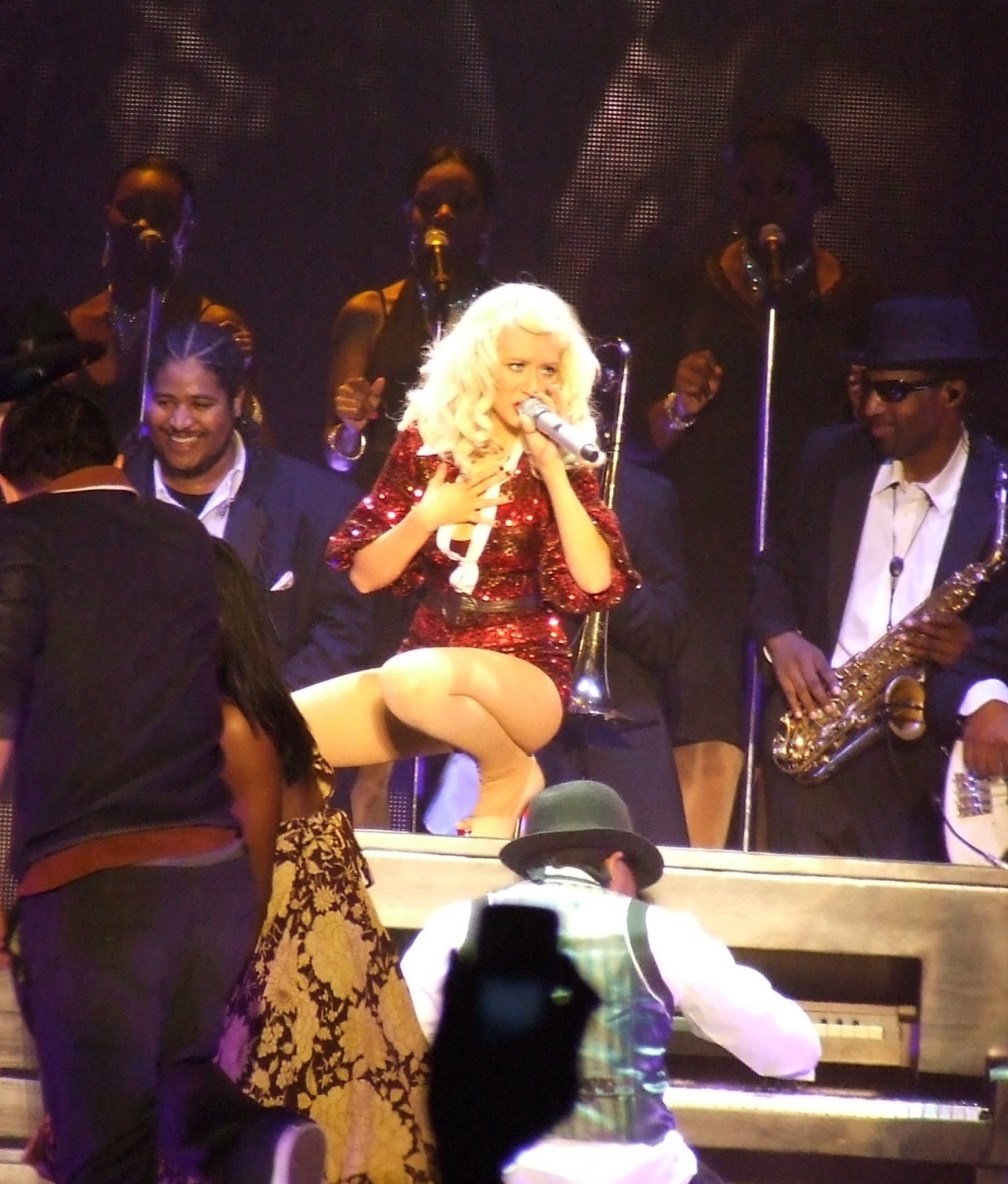
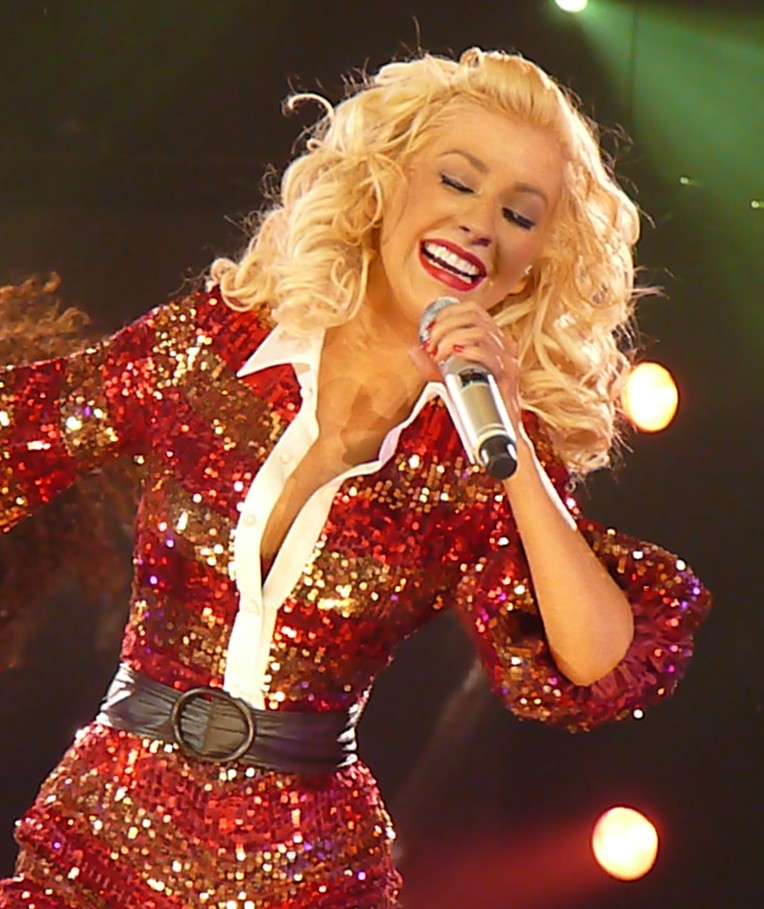
Aguilera performed "Makes Me Wanna Pray" sitting atop a piano (left) and a reggae version of "What a Girl Wants" (right) in a red bodysuit

The second act, Duke Joint, began with an erotic video interlude of "I Got Trouble", featuring scenes of Aguilera touching herself on bed and bathing in an old fashioned bathtub. For this section, Aguilera dressed in a sparkling red bodysuit. Aguilera performed "Makes Me Wanna Pray" on top of a piano, which was backed by a gospel choir. A remake of "What a Girl Wants" followed, featuring elements of reggae music. Duke Joint ended with Aguilera performing "Oh Mother" alone as images of a man repeatedly punching a woman as blood dripped from her face shown on the backdrop.

The third segment, Circus, opened with an interlude of "Enter the Circus" and a brief performance of "Welcome", which portrayed a circus-inspired stage as dancers swung on trapezes and breathed fire. For the performance of "Dirrty", which incorporated elements from "Cell Block Tango" from the Broadway musical Chicago and the classic march "Entrance of the Gladiators" by Julius Fučík, Aguilera rode a carousel horse. Next was the performance of "Candyman", in which Aguilera and the female dancers dressed in sailor styled suits and paid tribute to The Andrews Sisters, recreating a World War II theme. For the next number, "Nasty Naughty Boy", Aguilera expressed her S&M fantasy as she took a random male audience member onstage and attached him to the Wheel of Death. For the followup, "Hurt", Aguilera performed alone onstage in a plume outfit while a giant crescent moon descended from the ceiling. The section concluded with "Lady Marmalade", during which Aguilera performed in a pink embellished corset. The encore began with a video interlude of "Thank You (Dedication to Fans...)", featuring excerpts from Aguilera's previous music videos and voice mails from her fans. Aguilera then performed "Beautiful" alone onstage before ended the concert with "Fighter" with her dancers, at the end of which confetti rained down.

=== 2008 Abu Dhabi setlist ===
The 2008 setlist of the Back to Basics Tour in Abu Dhabi was slightly similar to the original set list, but was shorter and did not have the encore due to the show's complexity. The electropop version of "Genie in a Bottle", titled "Genie 2.0", was performed before the closing song "Fighter".

== Critical response ==
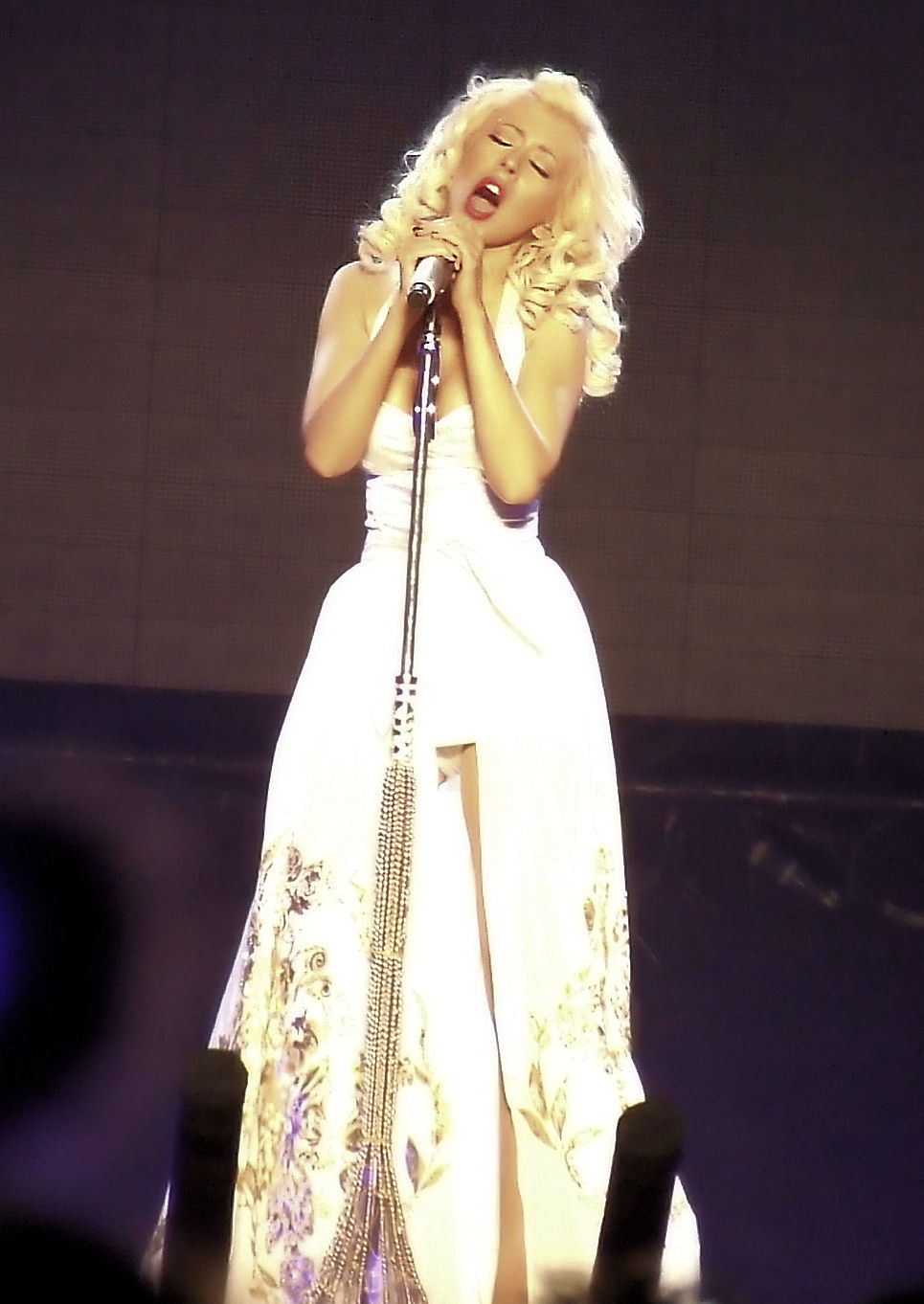
Aguilera performing "Understand" in a mini-dress with long train

The Back to Basics Tour received generally positive reviews from music critics. Jim Farber from the New York Daily News praised the show's accompaniment with a "horn-punctuated" band, the background visuals and the choreography, but called out Aguilera for her oversinging. An editor of the South China Morning Post, Paul Kay, provided a positive review toward the tour, applauding its synopsis and Aguilera's voice. Katie Boucher writing for the Abu Dhabi journal The National complimented the concert's setlist and Aguilera's attitude, writing that "you couldn't fail to be impressed by her spirit". Likewise, The Miami Student's Nicole Smith opined that "she really does prove that she is a fighter, through domestic violence, deceit and the basic wear and tear of fame".

An editor from Manchester Evening News opined that the concert had "unusually-genuine message of empowerment" and compared its setlist to Britney Spears's The Onyx Hotel Tour (2004). In a journal for The Press of Atlantic City, Regina Schaffer noted the similarities between the show and Madonna's Confessions Tour (2006) and was not impressed towards the makeovers of Aguilera's previous singles, such as "Come On Over Baby (All I Want Is You)" and "What a Girl Wants". Writing for The New York Times, Kelefa Sanneh called the tour "disappointing" because of Aguilera's "misguided" voice. On a more positive side, Cameron Adams from the Herald Sun and Cathy Garcia from The Korea Times praised Aguilera's vocals on the Back to Basics Tour.

Barry Walters from Rolling Stone wrote that, "Whereas Madonna pioneered her brand of bustier feminism with knowing finesse, Aguilera and pals opt for strip-club bombast, even when belting pro-female anthems. Now more woman than girl, Aguilera's looking and sounding stronger than ever, but could benefit from a little adult nuance". Joey Guerra, on a review for the Houston Chronicle, praised Aguilera for being "no mere copycat" but "[taking] essential pieces from other performers, other sounds, other eras and blends them into her own sexy style", further concluding that the artist "claims her pop throne". Daily Trojan's Michael Cooper labelled the tour "an almost-perfect pop concert" and commended on the show's "eye-catching" background and Aguilera's costumes.

Conversely, Sarah Godfrey from The Washington Post criticized the setlist and Aguilera's "overconfidence" during the show, but she noted that it was "insignificant" due to Aguilera's vocal performance. Dave Simpson of The Guardian gave the tour a two out of five stars rating, calling the song selection for the setlist "equally confusing" and opined that the tour was "delivered in a similar Mariah Carey tinnitus-inducing wail and the subject matter, generally, is that X-Tina is fantastic, is tough, is a victim and still enjoys sex – though hopefully not at the same time". Critic Kitty Empire from The Observer and Dave Tianen from the Milwaukee Journal Sentinel noted that the songs on the show did not go well with each other.

== Commercial performance ==
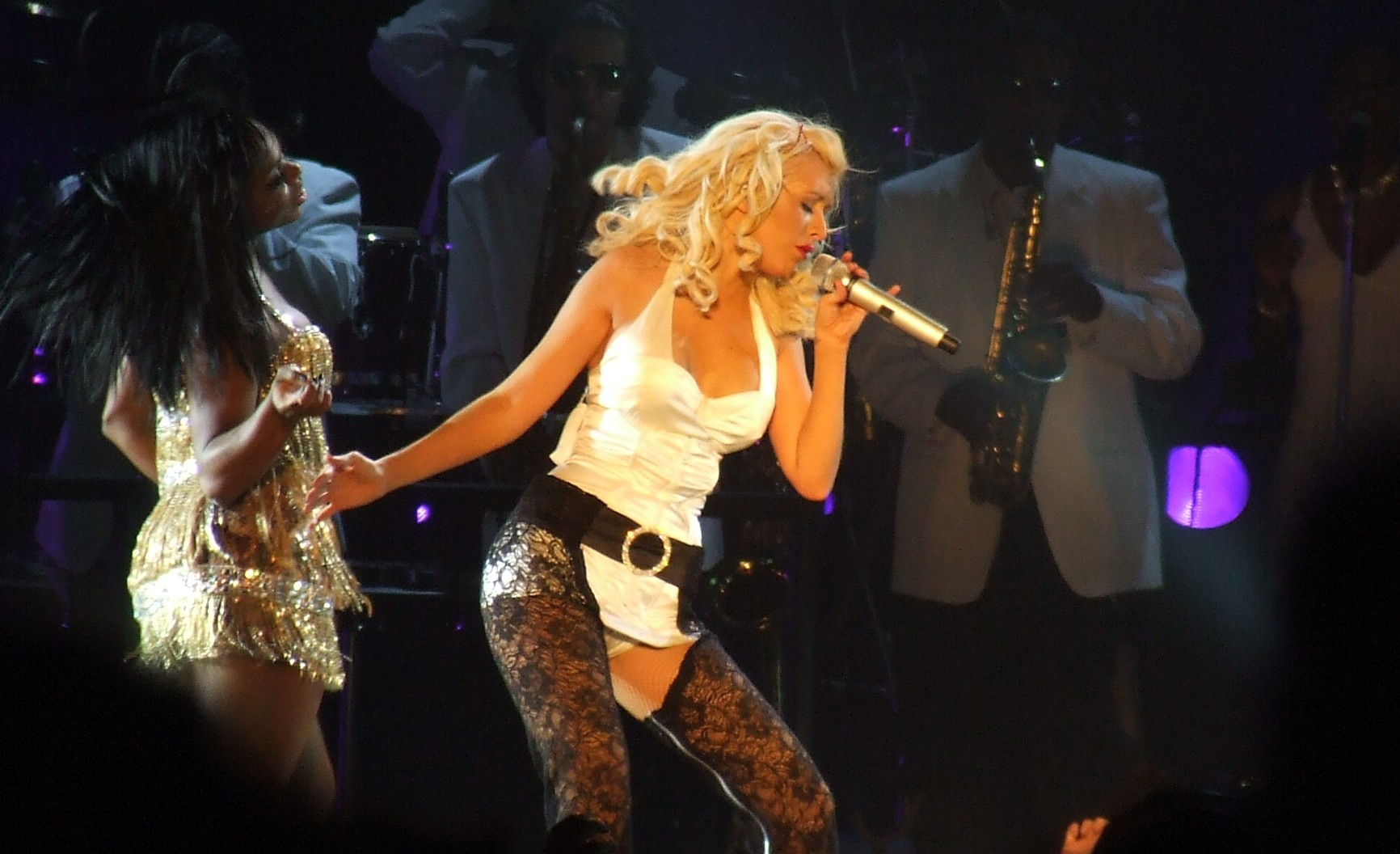
Aguilera performing "Can't Hold Us Down" in a white bodysuit and black lace chaps

After the United Kingdom leg, the Back to Basics Tour gained a huge number of tickets sold and revenue, with the tickets sold out in Dublin and Birmingham. Combined with the Belgium show, Billboard Boxscore calculated that the 9 shows garnered about $7.8 million. For the North America leg, although Billboard Boxscore did not calculate the attendance and gross for each date, the forty-one date run grossed a total of $28,921,000, with 391,700 tickets sold. After ten concerts held in Asia in early-July 2007, the Back to Basics Tour grossed $43,566,000, and became the second highest-grossing concert tour as of mid year 2007, only behind Justin Timberlake's FutureSex/LoveShow (with $52,187,000 grossed). The concert on July 6 in Taguig, Philippines, was attended by 30,000 people.

Aguilera initially planned a six date tour for the Australian leg. Subsequently, all of the tickets for the six dates had been sold out, leading Aguilera to expand the tour for three more dates in Perth, Brisbane and Adelaide. Four other dates for Melbourne and Auckland (New Zealand) were also planned, but was cancelled due to Aguilera suffering flu virus. The Back to Basics Tour garnered a total of $48.1 million in 2007, becoming the highest-grossing concert tour by a female of the year. At the 2007 Billboard Touring Awards, the Back to Basics Tour received two nominations: "Breakthrough Act" and "Top Package".

== Broadcasts and recordings ==
A concert film of the tour was produced. Filming took place in July 2007 across two shows at the Adelaide Entertainment Centre in Adelaide, Australia. The special, billed as Back to Basics: Live and Down Under, premiered on VH1 on January 26, 2008, followed by a physical DVD release on February 4.

== Set list ==
The following set list is adapted from the Back to Basics: Live and Down Under release.

1. "Intro (Back to Basics)"
2. "Ain't No Other Man"
3. "Back in the Day"
4. "Understand"
5. "Come on Over Baby (All I Want Is You)"
6. "Slow Down Baby"
7. "Still Dirrty"
8. "I Got Trouble"
9. "Makes Me Wanna Pray"
10. "What a Girl Wants"
11. "Oh Mother"
12. "Enter the Circus"
13. "Welcome"
14. "Dirrty"
15. "Candyman"
16. "Nasty Naughty Boy"
17. "Hurt"
18. "Lady Marmalade"

Encore

19. "Thank You"
20. "Beautiful"
21. "Fighter"

== Tour dates ==
List of 2006 concerts
Date (2006)	City	Country	Venue
November 17	Sheffield	England	Hallam FM Arena
November 20	Belfast	Northern Ireland	Odyssey Arena
November 21	Dublin	Ireland	Point Theatre
November 23	Manchester	England	AO Arena
November 24	Newcastle	England	Utilita Arena
November 26	Birmingham	England	National Indoor Arena
November 29	London	England	Wembley Arena
November 30	London	England	Wembley Arena
December 2	Rotterdam	Netherlands	Rotterdam Ahoy
December 3	Antwerp	Belgium	Sportpaleis
December 5	Frankfurt	Germany	Festhalle Frankfurt
December 6	Paris	France	Accor Arena
December 8	Oberhausen	Germany	König Pilsener Arena
December 11	Hamburg	Germany	Barclays Arena
December 13	Stuttgart	Germany	Hanns-Martin-Schleyer-Halle
December 14	Zürich	Switzerland	Hallenstadion
December 16	Vienna	Austria	Wiener Stadthalle
December 17	Prague	Czech Republic	Sazka Arena

List of 2007 concerts
Date (2007)	City	Country	Venue
February 20	Houston	United States	Toyota Center
February 21	Dallas	United States	American Airlines Center
February 23	Omaha	United States	Qwest Center Arena
February 24	Kansas City	United States	Kemper Arena
February 26	Denver	United States	Pepsi Center
February 28	Glendale	United States	Jobing.com Arena
March 2	San Diego	United States	iPayOne Center
March 3	Paradise (Note: Labelled as Las Vegas in promotional material.)	United States	Mandalay Bay Events Center
March 5	Anaheim	United States	Honda Center
March 6	Los Angeles	United States	Staples Center
March 9	Oakland	United States	Oracle Arena
March 10	San Jose	United States	HP Pavilion
March 12	Vancouver	Canada	General Motors Place
March 14	Edmonton	Canada	Rexall Place
March 15	Calgary	Canada	Pengrowth Saddledome
March 17	Winnipeg	Canada	MTS Centre
March 19	Saint Paul	United States	Xcel Energy Center
March 23	New York City	United States	Madison Square Garden
March 25	Toronto	Canada	Air Canada Centre
March 26	Ottawa	Canada	Scotiabank Place
March 28	Montreal	Canada	Bell Centre
March 30	Boston	United States	TD Banknorth Garden
March 31	Atlantic City	United States	Boardwalk Hall
April 2	Washington, D.C.	United States	Verizon Center
April 3	Philadelphia	United States	Wachovia Center
April 5	East Rutherford	United States	Continental Airlines Arena
April 7	Uniondale	United States	Nassau Coliseum
April 9	Auburn Hills	United States	The Palace of Auburn Hills
April 11	Columbus	United States	Nationwide Arena
April 13	Cleveland	United States	Wolstein Center
April 14	Pittsburgh	United States	Mellon Arena
April 20	Milwaukee	United States	Bradley Center
April 21	Rosemont	United States	Allstate Arena
April 23	Toronto	Canada	Air Canada Centre
April 25	Providence	United States	Dunkin' Donuts Center
April 27	Hartford	United States	Hartford Civic Center
April 29	Baltimore	United States	1st Mariner Arena
May 1	Raleigh	United States	RBC Center
May 2	Duluth	United States	The Arena at Gwinnett Center
May 4	Tampa	United States	St. Pete Times Forum
May 5	Sunrise	United States	Bank Atlantic Center
June 18	Osaka	Japan	Osaka-jō Hall
June 20	Tokyo	Japan	Nippon Budokan
June 21	Tokyo	Japan	Nippon Budokan
June 23	Seoul	South Korea	Olympic Gymnastics Arena
June 24	Seoul	South Korea	Olympic Gymnastics Arena
June 26	Shanghai	China	Shanghai Grand Stage
June 28	Bangkok	Thailand	Impact Arena
June 30	Singapore		Singapore Indoor Stadium
July 3	Hong Kong		AsiaWorld–Arena
July 6	Taguig	Philippines	Fort Bonifacio
July 13	Perth	Australia	Burswood Dome
July 14	Perth	Australia	Burswood Dome
July 17	Adelaide	Australia	Adelaide Entertainment Centre
July 18	Adelaide	Australia	Adelaide Entertainment Centre
July 20	Brisbane	Australia	Brisbane Entertainment Centre
July 21	Brisbane	Australia	Brisbane Entertainment Centre
July 24	Sydney	Australia	Acer Arena
July 25	Sydney	Australia	Acer Arena
July 27	Melbourne	Australia	Rod Laver Arena

List of 2008 concerts
Date (2008)	City	Country	Venue
October 20	Kyiv	Ukraine	Palats Sportu
October 21	Kyiv	Ukraine	Palats Ukraina
October 24	Abu Dhabi	United Arab Emirates	Emirates Palace

=== Canceled concerts ===
List of canceled concerts
Date (2007)	City	Country	Venue	Reason	Ref.
July 29	Melbourne	Australia	Rod Laver Arena	Illness	
July 30	Melbourne	Australia	Rod Laver Arena	Illness	
August 2	Auckland	New Zealand	Vector Arena	Illness	
August 3	Auckland	New Zealand	Vector Arena	Illness	

== Personnel ==
- Tour Director – Jamie King
- Musical Director – Rob Lewis
- Choreographer – Jeri Slaughter
- Costume Design – Roberto Cavalli
- Shoes – Christian Louboutin
- Tour Promoter – AEG Live
- Tour Sponsors – Verizon Wireless, Orange, Sony Ericsson

=== Band ===
- Guitar – Tariqh Akoni and Errol Cooney
- Bass – Ethan Farmer
- Drums – Brian Frasier-Moore
- Saxophone – Randy Ellis and Miguel Gandelman
- Trumpet – Ray Monteiro
- Trombone – Garrett Smith
- Percussion – Ray Yslas
- Background vocals – Sha'n Favors, Sasha Allen (North American & Pacific Leg), Erika Jerry and Belle Johnson (European Leg)
- Dancers – Paul Kirkland, Kiki Ely, Tiana Brown, Dres Reid, Gilbert Saldivar, Monique Slaughter, Nikki Tuazon, Marcel Wilson and Jeri Slaughter

=== Crew ===
- Stylist – Simone Harouche
- Hair & Make-Up Designer – Steve Sollitto
- Concert Video Design – Dago Gonzalez for Veneno, Inc.

== See also ==
- List of highest-grossing concert tours by women
