= Oh Mother =

2007 single by Christina Aguilera

Single by Christina Aguilera

from the album Back to Basics
- Released: September 28, 2007
- Studio: Chalice Recording Studios (Los Angeles, CA); Sarm Studios (London, UK)
- Length: 3:44
- Label: RCA
- Songwriters: Christina Aguilera; Derryck Thornton; Mark Rankin; Liz Thornton; Kara DioGuardi; Bruno Coulais; Christophe Barratier
- Producers: Big Tank; Q; L Boggie; Christina Aguilera

Christina Aguilera singles chronology
| "Slow Down Baby" (2007) | "Oh Mother" (2007) | "Keeps Gettin' Better" (2008) |

Audio video
- "Oh Mother" on YouTube

"Oh Mother" is a song by American singer Christina Aguilera from her fifth studio album, Back to Basics (2006). The song was released on August 13, 2007, by RCA Records as the fourth and final single from the album in European territories, while "Slow Down Baby" was serviced as the final single in Oceania. It was written by Aguilera, Derryck Thornton, Mark Rankin, Liz Thornton, Christophe Barratier, Bruno Coulais and Kara DioGuardi. Production was done by Big Tank and Q, with L Boggie credited as co-producer and Aguilera serviced as additional producer.

"Oh Mother" is a downtempo piano ballad that focuses on darker themes of female empowerment and violence against women(such as femicide or relationship abuse) where the female narrator (Christina Aguilera) talks about her abusive childhood. It incorporates various musical instruments, from strings to keyboards. It contains a sample from "Vois Sur Ton Chemin", written by Bruno Coulais and Christopher Barratler. Upon its release, the song was met with mainly positive reviews from contemporary music critics. It also managed to enter charts in Europe with moderate success.

== Background and recording ==
After releasing Stripped (2002) and collaborating with many different artists, Aguilera decided to record new old-school style materials for her upcoming album. She later explained that the lengthy break allowed her to write a lot about what she had experienced during that time. Aguilera also explained that she wanted to bring something novel to her album, which has 24 songs on it. She wanted to try to evolve as an artist and a visionary. As a result, Back to Basics, Aguilera's fifth studio album, is made up of two discs. On the first disc, she worked with "more beat-driven" producers, such as DJ Premier and Mark Ronson, who included samples in the production. The second one was written and produced solely by longtime producer Linda Perry. Aguilera sent letters to different producers that she hoped could help her with the direction she was taking for the project, encouraging them to experiment, re-invent and create a modern soul feel. She described the first disc as "kind of a throwback with elements of jazz, blues and soul music combined with a modern-day twist, like hard-hitting beats".

"Oh Mother" was written by Aguilera, Derryck Thornton, Mark Rankin, Liz Thornton, Christophe Barratier, Bruno Coulais and Kara DioGuardi. Production was done by Big Tank and Q, with L Boggie credited as co-producer and Aguilera serviced as additional producer. Piano and keyboards were provided by V. Young, while Rob Lewis served guitar and arranging. Lewis also played string instruments with Aroussiak Baltaian, Daniel Seidenberg, Garik Terzian, Ilana Setapen, Joel Pargman and Maia Jasper.

== Composition ==
"Oh Mother"
A 23-second sample of "Oh Mother"

"Oh Mother" is a piano ballad. Written in the key of C♯ minor, it is a downtempo track with a moderate tempo of 88 beats per minute. "Oh Mother" has a chord progression of C♯m–A/C♯–F♯m–G♯7 at the beginning. Aguilera's vocal range on the track spans from the low-note of F♯_{3} to the high-note of E_{5}. The track's instrumentation comes from guitar, strings, piano and keyboards. It also features a sample of "Vois Sur Ton Chemin", written by Bruno Coluais and Christopher Barratler. Spence D. for IGN called the track's melody "lulling" and "lithe".

According to Aguilera herself, "Oh Mother" talks about her abusive childhood. She revealed, "I think going through what I went through at a young age – the abuse that went on in my household – did affect me a lot. Domestic violence is a topic that is very hush-hush in society". Aguilera recalls the domestic violence of her childhood as she sings, "He took his anger out on her face, she kept all of her pain locked away". Nick Levine for Digital Spy said that "Oh Mother" is a "retread" of "I'm OK", a song with the same topic from Aguilera's 2002 album Stripped.

== Release ==
"Oh Mother" was serviced as the fourth and final single from Back to Basics in Europe: on September 28, 2007, it was available for digital downloads in Switzerland; on October 8, 2007, it was available for CD single sales in the United Kingdom. In Germany, the song was purchased as a CD single and as a digital download single on November 23, 2007. In the United Kingdom, "Oh Mother" was available for digital download on December 31, 2007. The single also impacted radio stations of countries in Europe including Switzerland, Germany, Czech Republic, and Austria in late 2007.

== Critical reception ==
Upon its release, "Oh Mother" was met with mainly positive reviews from contemporary music critics. Lucy Davis from BBC Music wrote that the song "might mean a lot to some, those with the tiresome self defence lyrics should go – when she gets on with the singing, there's nothing to prove". Slant Magazine editor Sal Cinquemani deemed "Oh Mother" a "lovely" piano and string melody "that we're offered a reprieve". Amanda Murray of Sputnikmusic was also positive toward "Oh Mother", commenting that "another ode to her single mother and middle-finger to her abusive father, is yet more proof that Aguilera works best when the subject matter actually means something to her, when the song is more than just something to sing". Spence D. for IGN was positive toward the song's meaning, writing that it "resonates with a bittersweet energy that helps it rise above the standard young pop queen fare of the day". MusicOMH's John Murray was not impressed with the song, calling it "good" but saying that it would "just make the bad moments feel so much worse". Digital Spy critic Nick Levine provided a negative review, giving it a two out of five stars rating and calling it "tremulous" with a "vibrato-fuelled conclusion". He also compared "Oh Mother" to Madonna's song "Oh Father" (1989) for the same sad melody as well as the same theme of child abuse. Reviewing Back to Basics, MTV Asia editor Gabriel Leong considered the song "a shining moment" on the album and "a touching paean to her [Aguilera's] mother in recognition of her strength and love".

== Commercial performance ==
On the Austrian Singles Chart, the single debuted at number 26 on December 7, 2007, and peaked at number 23 during the following week. There, the track remained for a total of nine weeks. In German, "Oh Mother" peaked at number 18 on the Media Control Charts. The single also peaked in the Netherlands and Switzerland at number 54 and 79, respectively.

== Live performances ==
To promote "Oh Mother" and Back to Basics, Aguilera performed the song on a number of occasions. On July 20, 2006, Aguilera performed the track at the Koko jazz club in London, which was held in front of 1,500 fans and invited guests. The 40-minute concert comprised songs from the then-upcoming Back to Basics and other songs, including "Lady Marmalade" (2001) and "Beautiful" (2002). MTV UK was positive toward the performance, wrote, "The gig reflected the jazz club mood of Christina's new album, with a swinging brass-heavy backing band and fit dancers bounding sexily around the stage". Later, "Oh Mother" was also performed during her worldwide Back to Basics Tour (2006–07). As she performed the track, the clip of a man repeatedly punching a woman as blood dripped from her face appeared on the screen. The tour was preceded by newspaper headlines that flashed across a big screen, such as, "Christina goes from 'dirrty' to demure" and "Christina cleans up her act". The performance is included on the video release Back to Basics: Live and Down Under (2008). A live video of the performance of "Oh Mother" during the tour, taken from the accompanying DVD, was premiered in late 2007. Nick Levine for Digital Spy called it a "cheap-looking" video.

== Track listings ==
CD single and German digital download

1. "Oh Mother" – 3:44
2. "Oh Mother" (instrumental) – 3:47

Swiss digital download

1. "Oh Mother" – 3:45

== Credits and personnel ==
Credits are adapted from the liner notes of Back to Basics, RCA Records.

- Contains a sample from the song "Vois Sur Ton Chemin", written by Bruno Coluais and Christopher Barratler.
- Songwriting – Christina Aguilera, Derryck Thornton, Mark Rankin, Liz Thornton, Christophe Barratier, Bruno Coulais and Kara DioGuardi
- Producing – Big Tank, Q
- Co-producing – L Boggie
- Additional producing – Christina Aguilera
- Guitar – Rob Lewis
- Strings – Rob Lewis, Aroussiak Baltaian, Daniel Seidenberg, Garik Terzian, Ilana Setapen, Joel Pargman, Maia Jasper
- Piano, keyboards – V. Young
- Arranging – Rob Lewis
- Recording – Oscar Ramirez

== Charts ==
=== Weekly charts ===
Weekly chart performance for "Oh Mother"
| Chart (2007–2008) | Peak position |
|---|---|
| Austria (Ö3 Austria Top 40) | 23 |
| CIS Airplay (TopHit) | 117 |
| Germany (GfK) | 18 |
| Germany Airplay (Official German Charts) | 4 |
| Lithuania (EHR) | 10 |
| Luxembourg Airplay (RTL Télé Lëtzebuerg) | 21 |
| Netherlands (Dutch Top 40 Tipparade) | 12 |
| Slovakia (Rádio Top 100) | 21 |
| Switzerland (Schweizer Hitparade) | 79 |

=== Year-end charts ===
Year-end chart performance for "Oh Mother"
| Chart (2007) | Position |
|---|---|
| Lebanon (NRJ) | 27 |

== Release history ==
Release dates and formats for "Oh Mother"
| Region | Date | Format(s) | Label(s) | Ref. |
|---|---|---|---|---|
| Canada | September 28, 2007 | Digital download | Sony BMG | |
| Switzerland | September 28, 2007 | Digital download | Sony BMG | |
| United Kingdom | October 8, 2007 | CD | RCA | |
| Germany | November 23, 2007 | CD; digital download | Sony BMG | |
| United Kingdom | December 31, 2007 | Digital download | RCA | |
