= Slow Down Baby =

2007 single by Christina Aguilera

Single by Christina Aguilera

from the album Back to Basics
- Released: July 24, 2007
- Studio: Allido Sound (New York City, NY); The Record Plant (Los Angeles, CA)
- Genre: Pop; R&B
- Length: 3:27
- Label: RCA
- Songwriters: Christina Aguilera; Mark Ronson; Kara DioGuardi; Raymond Angry; William Guest; Merald Knight; Edward Patten; Gladys Knight; Marvin Bernard; Michael Harper; Curtis Jackson
- Producers: Mark Ronson; Christina Aguilera (add.)

Christina Aguilera singles chronology
"Candyman" (2007)	"Slow Down Baby" (2007)	"Oh Mother" (2007)

Audio video
- "Slow Down Baby" on YouTube

"Slow Down Baby" is a song recorded by American singer Christina Aguilera from her fifth studio album, Back to Basics (2006). It was released as the album's fourth single on July 28, 2007 by RCA Records. It was written by Aguilera, Mark Ronson, Kara DioGuardi and Raymond Angry, and produced by Ronson and co-produced by Aguilera. The song is built around samples of "Window Raisin' Granny" (1973) by American group Gladys Knight and the Pips and "So Seductive" (2005) by American rapper Tony Yayo. Due to the inclusion of the samples, the original songs' writers obtained writing credits.

Musically, "Slow Down Baby" is a pop and R&B song that incorporates elements of funk, hip hop and soul. It features claviola, horn, organ and piano instrumentation. The single was only released in Australia during the Oceanian leg of Aguilera's Back to Basics Tour (2007). "Slow Down Baby" peaked at number 21 on the Australian Singles Chart, although it did not receive any promotion in that country.

== Background ==
Aguilera's fifth studio album, Back to Basics, is made up of two discs. Aguilera worked with "more beat-driven" producers on the first disc, such as DJ Premier and Mark Ronson, who included samples in the production. The second disc consists solely of collaborations with producer Linda Perry. Aguilera sent letters to different producers that she hoped could help her with the direction she was taking for the project, encouraging them to experiment, re-invent and create a modern soul feel. She described the first disc as "kind of a throwback with elements of jazz, blues and soul music combined with a modern-day twist, like hard-hitting beats".

Aguilera and Ronson wrote "Slow Down Baby" alongside Kara DioGuardi and Raymond Angry, and Ronson completed the production with assistance from Aguilera. In an interview for Herald Sun, Ronson elaborated on the collaboration: "I heard [Aguilera] was looking for tracks. I was a bit narrow-minded, I assumed nothing I was doing would be something she'd be into. I sent around some hip hop tracks I had lying about and got a call four days later saying she liked them." He stated that he had initially imagined offering "Slow Down Baby" to someone like rap duo M.O.P. Ronson provided the beats and played the guitar and bass, while Angry played the claviola, organ and piano. Ronson recorded Aguilera's vocals at Allido Sound in New York City and additional recording was helmed by Oscar Ramirez at The Record Plant in Los Angeles, California. Dave "Hard Drive" Pensado later completed the mixing process at Larrabee North in North Hollywood.

== Composition ==
"Slow Down Baby"
A 21-second sample of "Slow Down Baby"'s chorus, featuring the "Window Raisin' Granny" and "So Seductive" samples and elements of R&B, hip hop, funk and soul genres.

"Slow Down Baby" is an uptempo pop and R&B song that blends modern and "old school" R&B. It has elements of funk, hip hop and soul. Nick Levine of Digital Spy called it "hot'n'horny retropop", and JournalNews critic Sonia Murray observed that it "savvily" combines hip hop and early soul. "Slow Down Baby"'s instrumentation consists of pianos and horns, which recall the 1970s blaxploitation film genre. In the lyrics, Aguilera tells a "lusty" man to leave her alone as she sings, "If you knew anything you'd realise I'm wearing a ring". The song contains two samples, "Window Raisin' Granny" (1973) by R&B group Gladys Knight & the Pips—written by William Guest, Merald Knight, Edward Patten and Gladys Knight—and "So Seductive" (2005) by rapper Tony Yayo—written by Marvin Bernard, Michael Harper and Curtis Jackson. Due to its sampling, the original songs' writers are credited as songwriters. According to sheet music published at Musicnotes.com by Universal Music Publishing Group, "Slow Down Baby" is written in the time signature of common time with a moderate beat rate of 110 beats per minute. The song is written in the key of F♯ minor and Aguilera's vocal range spans from the low-note of A_{3} to the high-note of G_{5}. According to Spence D. of IGN, "Slow Down Baby" interpolates a "vocal page" from LL Cool J's "Jingling Baby" (1990).

The Silibil N' Brains song "It's All Love", intended for release on the band's unreleased 2004 debut album Losers, features a similar music bed to "Slow Down Baby" - both songs are built on samples of "Window Raisin' Granny".

== Critical reception ==
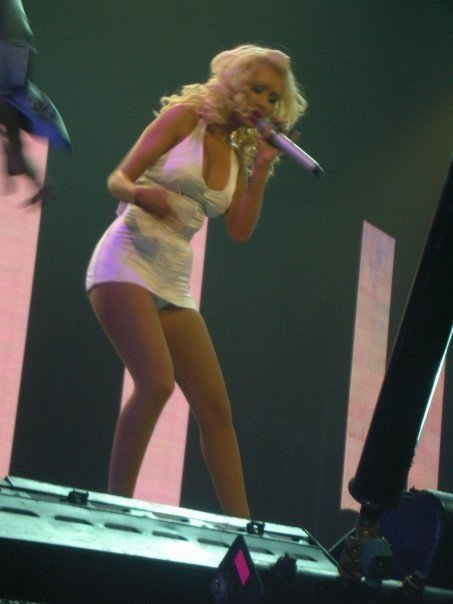
Aguilera performing "Slow Down Baby" on the Back to Basics Tour

The Guardian critic Dorian Lyskey was positive regarding "Slow Down Baby", writing that it "smartly slaps a 50 Cent samplehow funk". John Murphy of musicOMH named it one of the album's highlights and deemed it "fresh and funky". Moreover, Murphy called it "sharp and sassy infectious pop" and used it as an example of Aguilera being "at her best". Writing for The Boston Globe, Joan Anderman commented that the song's "tangle of horns and pianos [are] pushed to the edge of sonic sense". Len Righi of The Morning Call wrote that Aguilera "sings with remarkable conviction" throughout the album, but the soul and funk of "Slow Down Baby" put her at "Aretha Franklin's doorstep". The Virginian-Pilot writer Malcolm Venable commented that "Slow Down Baby", alongside "Back in the Day" and "Without You", displays Aguilera's "well-shaking" vocals and "tight, seemingly effortless songwriting".

Jody Rosen of Entertainment Weekly wrote that the song "neatly blends old- and new-school R&B". Tampa Bay Times critic Sean Daly referred "Slow Down Baby" to as "the very essence of Aguilera", indicating "old school, new school and big vocal belting". Spence D. of IGN recommended "Slow Down Baby" for digital download and commended Aguilera's "throaty insistence". Scott Mervis of Pittsburgh Post-Gazette wrote that the song, alongside the album's first single "Ain't No Other Man" and "Understand", "keep [Aguilera] on the track of torchy old-school soul that lets her limitless voice run wild and free". In 2010, Digital Spy's critic Nick Levine included "Slow Down Baby" on a list of Aguilera's ten best songs.

== Commercial performance ==
To promote the Oceanian leg of the Back to Basics Tour, "Slow Down Baby" was released as the album's fourth single on July 28, 2007, in Australia. It debuted at number 41 on the ARIA Digital Tracks chart in the issue dated July 23, 2007. The song later entered the main singles chart at number 21 in the issue dated August 6, 2007. The position became its peak, which made it Aguilera's first single since "I Turn to You" (2000) to miss the top ten. The same week, "Slow Down Baby" debuted at number 20 on the physical singles chart, and rose to number 22 on the digital chart. It remained on the main chart for six weeks.

== Live performances ==
Aguilera first performed the song during a concert held in front of 1,500 fans and invited guests in London on July 20, 2006. The 40-minute concert comprised songs from the then-upcoming Back to Basics and other songs, including "Lady Marmalade" (2001) and "Beautiful" (2002). Aguilera ended the show with "Slow Down Baby", and David Smyth of Evening Standard commented that the song "rounded things up with big horns and bigger beats". The song was later performed during the worldwide Back to Basics Tour. The performance was preceded by newspapers headlines that flashed across a big screen, such as, "Christina goes from 'dirrty' to demure" and "Christina cleans up her act". Aguilera wore black lace thigh-high boots and a white bodysuit. The performance is included on the video release Back to Basics: Live and Down Under (2008).

== Formats and track listing ==
- CD single and digital download
1. "Slow Down Baby" (album version) – 3:27
2. "Slow Down Baby" (instrumental version) – 3:27

== Credits and personnel ==
Credits are adapted from the "Slow Down Baby" liner notes.

Recording and samples

- Recorded at Allido Sound, New York City and The Record Plant, Los Angeles, California
- Contains a sample from "Window Raisin' Granny", written by William Guest, M. Knight, Edward Patten and Gladys Knight as performed by Gladys Knight and the Pips
- Contains a sample from "So Seductive", written by Marvin Bernard, Michael Harper and Curtis Jackson as performed by Tony Yayo

Personnel

- Lead vocals - Christina Aguilera
- Songwriting – Christina Aguilera, Mark Ronson, Kara DioGuardi, Raymond Angry, William Guest, M. Knight, Edward Patton, Gladys Knight, Marvin Bernard, Michael Harper
- Production – Mark Ronson
- Additional production – Christina Aguilera
- Beats, guitar and bass – Mark Ronson
- Clav, organ and piano – Raymond Angry
- Recording – Mark Ronson, Oscar Ramirez
- Mixing – Dave "Hard Drive" Pensado
- Assistant mixing – The Blitzburg Group

== Charts ==
Weekly chart performance for "Slow Down Baby"
Chart (2007)	Peak position
Australia (ARIA)	21
New Zealand Airplay (Recorded Music NZ)	38

== Release history ==
Release dates and formats for "Slow Down Baby"
Region	Date	Format(s)	Label(s)	Ref.
Australia	July 24, 2007	Digital download	Sony BMG	
Australia	July 28, 2007	CD	Sony BMG	
