= Back to Basics (Christina Aguilera album) =

Studio album by Christina Aguilera
- Released: August 9, 2006
- Recorded: February 2005 – April 2006
- Studios: Chalice Recording Studios; Record Plant (Los Angeles, California); Allido Sound (New York City, New York); Maze Studios (Atlanta, Georgia); SARM Studios (London, England)
- Genres: Pop; R&B
- Length: 1:18:43
- Label: RCA
- Producers: Ben Allen; Big Tank; Charles Martin Roane; DJ Premier; Kwamé; Linda Perry; Rich Harrison; Mark Ronson; Tony Reyes; Q

Christina Aguilera chronology
Justin & Christina (2003)	Back to Basics (2006)	Keeps Gettin' Better: A Decade of Hits (2008)

Singles from Back to Basics
- 1. "Ain't No Other Man" Released: June 6, 2006; 2. "Hurt" Released: September 17, 2006; 3. "Candyman" Released: February 20, 2007; 4. "Slow Down Baby" Released: July 24, 2007; 5. "Oh Mother" Released: September 28, 2007

Back to Basics is the fifth studio album by American singer Christina Aguilera. It was released on August 9, 2006, in the United States by RCA Records as a double album. Serving as executive producer, she enlisted a wide range of producers, including DJ Premier, Rich Harrison, Rob Lewis, Mark Ronson, and Linda Perry. Recording sessions took place between February 2005 and April 2006 at several studios in the United States and the United Kingdom.

Inspired by Aguilera's 1920s–1950s idols, including Billie Holiday, Otis Redding, Etta James, and Ella Fitzgerald, Back to Basics was described by Aguilera herself as a fusion of old-school jazz and soul inspirations with a modernized style. It is primarily a pop and R&B record; its first disc juxtaposes rhythm and blues with hip hop and urban elements with most songs employing samples, while the second contains all original tracks with the exception of "Candyman", which samples "Tarzan & Jane Swingin' on a Vine". Lyrically, the album is inspired by Aguilera's previous life events including her marriage with Jordan Bratman in 2005.

To portray a new persona, Aguilera adopted her new alter ego Baby Jane and made several changes to her public appearance, inspired by classic Hollywood actresses. She promoted the album by performing at events like the 2006 MTV Movie Awards, the 2006 MTV Video Music Awards and the 49th Annual Grammy Awards. It was further promoted with Back to Basics Tour, which visited countries in North America, Asia, Europe, Australia and Middle East from late 2006 until late 2008. Back to Basics spawned three international singles: "Ain't No Other Man", "Hurt" and "Candyman"; "Slow Down Baby" was only released as a single in Australia, while "Oh Mother" was only released as a single in several European countries.

Back to Basics received favorable reviews from music critics, who complimented its musical diversity from Aguilera's previous albums while there were others who criticized its length. The album received a Grammy Award nomination for Best Pop Vocal Album, and its lead single "Ain't No Other Man" won Best Female Pop Vocal Performance at the 49th Annual Grammy Awards (2007). It debuted at number one on the US Billboard 200 with first-week sales of 346,000 copies. Back to Basics achieved similar success internationally, reaching the top of the charts in over fifteen countries including Australia, Canada, Germany, Ireland, Switzerland and United Kingdom. The album has sold 2 million copies in the United States, and over 5 million worldwide, as of November 2013.

== Background and development ==
"(...) It was an education and an inspiration that I would continue exploring—and eventually translate into an album of dedication I made with DJ Premier, called Back to Basics, paying homage and utmost respect to some of the greatest musicians and artists of all time. The voices that paved the way for mine."

— Aguilera about discovering the music of her favorite artists, including Franklin, James and Fitzgerald, and the impact it made on her life

At the 46th Annual Grammy Awards on February 8, 2004, Aguilera announced that she was going to work on a follow-up album to Stripped (2002). She stated her main idea for the project was to "evolve as an artist and a visionary", which was taken from a poem she wrote during the Stripped Tour (2003). In a July 2006 interview with Billboard magazine, Aguilera expressed dissatisfaction with newer music, as technology "has advanced itself so anybody can be a singer". Thus, Aguilera took musical inspirations from old-school jazz, blues and soul records performed by her 1920s–1950s idols, including Billie Holiday, Otis Redding, Etta James and Ella Fitzgerald, which she viewed as "music that really had heart". The singer stated that her love for retro music was born when she was a child—her mother and grandmother took her to the old vinyl stores in Pittsburgh. According to Aguilera, Back to Basics was meant to pay "homage and utmost respect" to some of her favorite musicians. In an ex post facto review for PopMatters, music journalist Kimberley Hill noted that Aguilera found inspiration to record blue-eyed soul music as early as 2001–2002, when Stripped was recorded.

== Recording and production ==
To create a "throwback" with elements of old-school genres combined with "a modern-day twist", Aguilera sent letters to different producers that she hoped could help her with the direction she was taking for the project, encouraging them to experiment, reinvent and create a modern soul feel. She initially planned to condense the album into a single, more "affordable" disc, however, she expanded Back to Basics as a double album. For the first disc, Aguilera collaborated with hip hop producers including DJ Premier, Rich Harrison, Kwamé, and Mark Ronson for the first time. Most songs from the first half incorporate horn samples to create "gritty and old" sounds. DJ Premier questioned if Aguilera was familiar with his work, though she had known of his jazz-influenced work with Gang Starr in the late 1980s and early 1990s. In response, Aguilera wanted her album to draw inspirations from Premier's song "Jazz Thing" and noted that their collaboration became his first time "venturing into the 'pop' world". For the "1920s and 1930s-era vibe"-influenced second disc, Aguilera teamed up with longtime producer Linda Perry, who produced on Aguilera's previous album Stripped. In contrast to the first disc, the second one consists of all live recordings without using samples (with the exception of "Candyman" featuring a sample of "Tarzan & Jane Swingin' on a Vine").

Recording sessions of the project took place between February 2005 and April 2006 at various studios in the United States and the United Kingdom, including the Chalice Recording Studios and The Record Plant in Los Angeles, California. All songs from Back to Basics were recorded using Pro Tools HD3 program and done with a SSL J9000 console with ninety-six inputs. Aguilera's vocals were recorded using a Telefunken ELAM 251 microphone, possibly in conjunction with an Avalon M-5 pre-amp. Producer Scott Storch, who contributed to Aguilera's previous studio album Stripped, was asked to return for the production of Back to Basics. However, he refused the offer when Aguilera declined to pay airfare for him and his entourage to fly out to Los Angeles, which led to a breakdown of their relationship. Subsequently, Aguilera included the song "F.U.S.S." (an abbreviation to "Fuck You Scott Storch") on the album, which Storch viewed as "pathetic".

Aguilera also recorded a song about oral sex titled "Fuck You, Suck You" during a studio session with Linda Perry.

== Music and lyrics ==
"Makes Me Wanna Pray"
A 24-second sample of "Makes Me Wanna Pray" from the first disc, incorporating a gospel choir and lyrically inspired by Aguilera's marriage with Jordan Bratman.

According to Aguilera and the production team, Back to Basics draws influences from 1920s–1940s jazz and soul music. However, music critics identified the record as a pop, and R&B album with similarities to 1960s, 1970s and 1980s albums. Dorian Lyskey writing for The Guardian thought that the album's concept "is so wide as to be meaningless", while Serene Dominic from Phoenix New Times compared Back to Basics' musical style to rock band The Beatles' self-titled album (1968).

The first half disc incorporates strong elements from hip hop, urban, blending traditional and contemporary R&B. It features horn samples and gospel choirs, making it sound like "a dusty old vinyl album", according to Jenny Eliscu from Rolling Stone. Most songs from the disc employ samples, with the exception of "Without You", "Still Dirrty" and "F.U.S.S." "Makes Me Wanna Pray" featuring Steve Winwood (appearing via a sample of the 1970 Traffic instrumental "Glad" from John Barleycorn Must Die) features a gospel choir in its arrangement, while the pop/R&B and funk number "Ain't No Other Man" features "aerobic oomph" that is similar to Beyoncé's "Crazy in Love". "Understand" is an R&B ballad, featuring soul influences that are similar to ballads done by Gladys Knight, while "Slow Down Baby" blends traditional and contemporary R&B with hip hop and soul elements. The three follow-ups "Oh Mother", "On Our Way", and "Without You" are piano ballads. "Still Dirrty" was described as a "filthy... strut" with hip hop elements. According to Billboard, the interlude "F.U.S.S." stands for "F— you, Scott Storch", and its lyrics are aimed at Storch, who refused to work on Back to Basics, so he could work on his then-girlfriend Paris Hilton's debut album, Paris.

The second disc of Back to Basics opens with "Enter the Circus", described as a "carnival-creepy orchestration that sounds like Danny Elfman soundtracking Cabaret" by Tampa Bay Times, and followed by the soft rock-inspired "Welcome". "Candyman" draws inspirations from jazz, blues and swing, and was musically inspired by The Andrews Sisters' song "Boogie Woogie Bugle Boy" (1941). Similarly, "Nasty Naughty Boy" also contains elements of jazz and blues and features "blaring horn section" in its arrangement. On "I Got Trouble", Aguilera sings over a blues-inspired theme that is reminiscent of songs by Bessie Smith. "Mercy on Me" features gospel elements, while the acoustic track "Save Me from Myself" is inspired by country rock, different from other tracks on Back to Basics.

Most songs from Back to Basics were inspired by real-life events that Aguilera had experienced. The track "Oh Mother" talks about Aguilera's childhood with her abusive father; its lyrical theme was compared to Madonna's "Oh Father" (1989). Her marriage with Jordan Bratman was the main theme of the album, with tracks inspired by the event including "Makes Me Wanna Pray", "Ain't No Other Man", "On Our Way", "Without You", "Mercy on Me", "Save Me from Myself" and "The Right Man". On "The Right Man", Aguilera expresses that she has found "the right man" for her imagined daughter as she hopes that the child would not have to experience an abusive childhood like her, singing: "One day, My little girl will reach out her hand and she'll know I found the right man".

Aguilera expresses excitement toward old-school music on "Back in the Day", where she names classic artists including Etta James, Marvin Gaye, Coltrane and Aretha Franklin. "F.U.S.S." (which stands for "Fuck You Scott Storch"), is directed toward producer Scott Storch, who didn't accept Aguilera's offer to produce Back to Basics, containing lyrics such as: "Looks like I didn't need you / Still got the album out". In the lyrics of "Slow Down Baby", Aguilera tells a "lusty" man to leave her alone as she sings: "If you knew anything you'd realize I'm wearing a ring". "Still Dirrty" was described as a sequel to Aguilera's song "Dirrty" (2002), in which Aguilera sings about her "sexual independence": "Why is a woman's sexuality always under so much scrutiny / Why can't she do exactly as she please" and claims that she's "still got the nasty" in her. "Here to Stay" tells how Aguilera is "not just a flash in the pan pop starlet", while "Thank You (Dedication to Fans...)" features voice mails from Aguilera's fans, such as "You're so amazing" or "You inspired me to carry on living..."

== Artwork and release ==
For Back to Basics, Aguilera decided to portray her different image and persona from her previous stage name Xtina by adopting a new alter ego called Baby Jane, named after a character of the film What Ever Happened to Baby Jane? (1962). She also changed her public appearance as she removed her piercings, and dyed her hair platinum blonde, inspired by classic Hollywood movie stars such as Marilyn Monroe, Marlene Dietrich, Carole Lombard and Greta Garbo.

The album's cover artwork was taken by German photographer Ellen von Unwerth during three days; on the first and second days, the photos were shot at the Hollywood Dell hotel. Aguilera and von Unwerth moved to Forty Deuce in Hollywood to take images inspired by 1920s burlesque clubs on the last day of the session. The album's cover artwork was revealed in late June 2006, featuring Aguilera with bright red lipstick and curly blonde hair dressed in white and lounging on a bed. Greg Kot from The Baltimore Sun labelled the cover artwork as "a classy retro look, a sign that [Aguilera] is ready for her close-up as the leading lady of the teen brat pack that emerged in the late '90s". It also received criticism for being too similar to the artwork of Madonna's sixth studio album, Bedtime Stories (1994).

In mid-2006, Virgin Media reported that Back to Basics would be released on August 14, 2006. TMZ later reported that Back to Basics was planned to be released on August 15, 2006, in the United States. The album was leaked in full on August 3.

The album was first released on vinyl on November 6, 2006, as a triple album in a heavyweight bound book-like sleeve, featuring the songs equivalent to the first disc of the CD edition split across two records. It would be reissued on vinyl by Urban Outfitters on March 27, 2018, this time in a single sleeve and as a double album, with the tracks from the first CD on a single disc.

It was released on cassette only in South Korea, Indonesia, Malaysia, and Romania as a single cassette, with the tracks from the first CD on the A-side (minus "Thank You (Dedication to Fans)") and the tracks from the second disc, plus "Thank You", on the B-side. It was also released in Egypt and Gulf Cooperation Council countries as a double cassette.

== Promotion ==
=== Live performances and tour ===
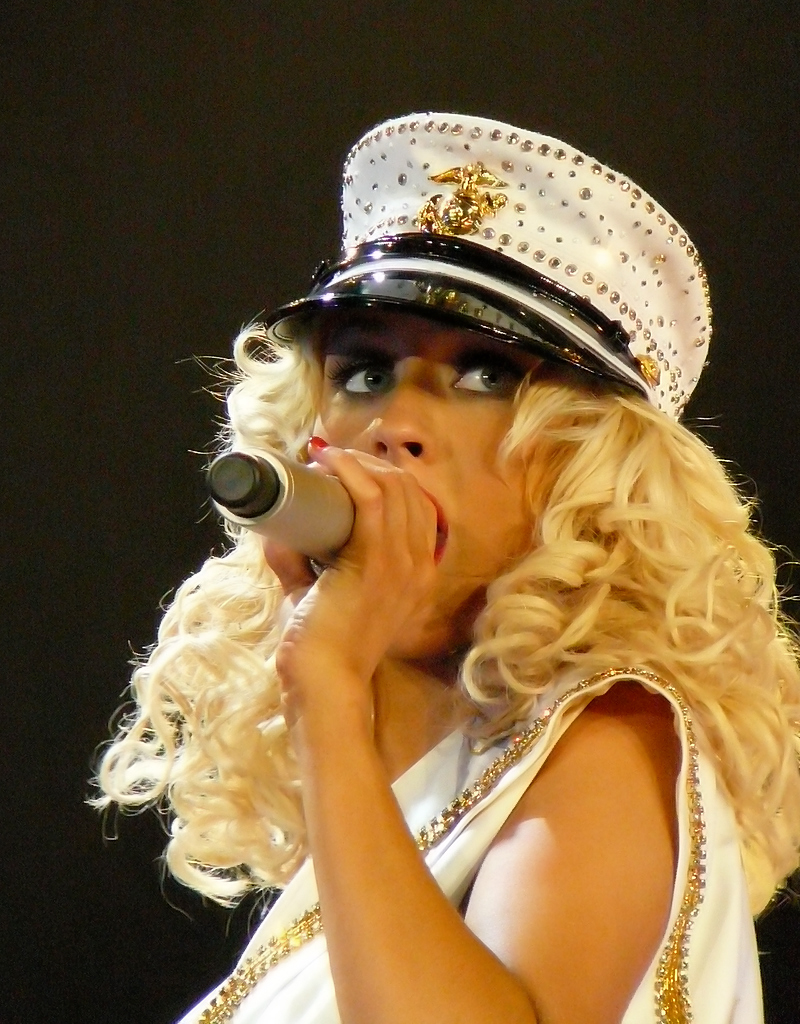
Aguilera performing "Candyman", the album's third single, on the Back to Basics Tour (2006–2008)

Aguilera began her promotion of Back to Basics with a live performance of "Ain't No Other Man" at the 2006 MTV Movie Awards on June 8, 2006. On July 20, Aguilera held a forty-minute concert at Camden Palace Theatre in London, where she performed five songs from her then-upcoming album and two previous singles. Two days later, Aguilera appeared at Channel 4 Studios in London, performing "Ain't No Other Man", Understand", "Candyman" and "Beautiful". On August 12, Aguilera performed "Ain't No Other Man", Understand", "Back in the Day" and "Candyman" at Yahoo! Music Studios, in Los Angeles. On August 15, Aguilera held a release party at the MTV Studios for the album in New York City, New York. She also performed "Ain't No Other Man" at Late Show With David Letterman, on August 16. Aguilera performed "Ain't No Other Man", "Beautiful" and "Candyman" at Bryant Park, New York City on August 18. Aguilera performed "Hurt" at the 2006 MTV Video Music Awards on August 31. On September 8, she performed "Candyman" and "Bennie and the Jets" at the Fashion Rocks charity event; the latter was a duet with Elton John. Aguilera also sang "Ain't No Other Man", "Hurt" and "Steppin' Out with My Baby" with Tony Bennett on Saturday Night Live on November 11, 2006. "Hurt" was also sung on the NBC Christmas Thanksgiving Special in November, and the German television series Wetten, dass..? in December 2006. On December 31, 2006, Aguilera appeared on Dick Clark's New Year's Rockin' Eve and performed "Candyman" and "Fighter".

On February 10, 2007, Aguilera sang "Makes Me Wanna Pray" and "Candyman" at the Clive Davis' Pre-Grammy Awards Party. She also performed "Candyman" on The Tonight Show with Jay Leno. Between late 2006 and late 2008, Aguilera visited North America, Asia, Europe, Oceania and the Middle East during her Back to Basics Tour. It was promoted by the telecommunications companies Orange and Sony Ericsson. The eighty-one-show tour received positive reviews from critics, who complimented it as the strongest of her career. Grossing over $90 million worldwide, it became the ninth highest-grossing tour ever for a female artist and the most profitable world tour by a female artist in 2007. In February 2008, the live video album Back to Basics: Live and Down Under was released.

=== Singles ===
The first track from the album to be made available to the public was "Ain't No Other Man", which was released as the lead single to contemporary hit radio in the United States on June 6, 2006. Aguilera was featured in Pepsi's commercial advertisement, which used "Here to Stay", a track from Back to Basics as its main theme. Shot in multiple territories around the world, including Saudi Arabia, Prague, Rio de Janeiro, Tokyo, and India, the sixty-second advertisement premiered worldwide on July 14, 2006. Alongside the commercial, "Here to Stay" was made available for digital download on mobile phones as a promotional record to then-upcoming Back to Basics. "Hurt" and "Candyman" were serviced as the album's second and third international singles on September 17, 2006, and February 20, 2007, respectively. "Slow Down Baby" was released exclusively in Australia on July 28, 2007, while "Oh Mother" was released in several European countries in late 2007. In January 2008, Aguilera released a music video for the track "Save Me from Myself", following giving birth to her son Max Bratman.

== Critical reception ==
Professional ratings
Aggregate scores
Source	Rating
Metacritic	69/100
Review scores
Source	Rating
AllMusic	4.5/5 stars
Entertainment Weekly	B+
The Observer	3/5 stars
PopMatters	7/10
Rolling Stone	3/5 stars
Slant Magazine	3/5 stars
Sputnikmusic	4/5
Stylus Magazine	B
Uncut	8/10
Yahoo! Music	8/10

Back to Basics received positive reviews upon release. On Metacritic, which assigns a normalized rating out of 100 to reviews from mainstream critics, Back to Basics received an average score of 69, which indicates "generally favorable reviews", based on 17 reviews. Stephen Thomas Erlewine from AllMusic appreciated the album's production, commenting that the project was "all the more impressive" coming after the "near career suicide of Stripped". Entertainment Weekly's Jody Rosen opined that Aguilera "can make her own glorious kind of 21st-century noise" and compared Aguilera's vocal ability on the album to that of Mariah Carey. Mike Joseph of PopMatters felt that Aguilera "still shouts at times when a coo will do", but felt that her choice in collaborators made for an "ultimately rewarding listen". Sputnikmusic's Amanda Murray noted Back to Basics as another "transitional" and "innovative" record for Aguilera. Lucy Davies from BBC Music said that Aguilera has a "stunning voice", but stated that she could be more varied by cutting out some of the "y-e-e-eeeh, woah yeh's" on the second album.

Thomas Innskeep from Stylus Magazine preferred the first disc of the album over the "ridiculously overblown ballads" on the second disc, adding that Back to Basics was "one of 2006's best when Linda Perry's fingerprints aren't present". Similarly, Yahoo! Music's Dan Gennoe described the first disc as a "low-down and dirty masterpiece", but said the second disc found Aguilera "crashing straight back down again". Paul Flynn from The Observer provided a mixed review, saying that the beginning of the album was "all craft and very little heart"; however, he found the collaborations between her and Perry to be "deeply cinematic". Rolling Stone's Jenny Eliscu opined that the release was "overindulgent and self-important", but would have been "masterful" had it been condensed into a single disc. Kelefa Sanneh from The New York Times gave a mixed review, stating that it "contains a roughly even number of great songs and lousy ones", and sait that "her homages to World War II-era pop music resemble skits more than songs". Sal Cinquemani of Slant Magazine criticized Aguilera for using a sexual image to overshadow her vocals, but commented that Back to Basics was more "cohesive" than Stripped. Robert Christgau provided a negative review, classifying the album as a "dud".

The album was also included in the book 1001 Albums You Must Hear Before You Die by Robert Dimery.

=== Retrospective reception ===
10 years after its release, Jeff Benjamin of Fuse called Back to Basics Aguilera's "riskiest album", and stated: "While Aguilera shows the world who she truly was on Stripped, BTB appeared to be the first time Xtina got to truly create her own universe." PopMatters editor Kimberley Hill praised Back to Basics as "an ambitious blend of early 20th century gospel music, country blues, Philadelphian soul, 1970s funk, and mid-2000s hip-hop/R&B", and also called it "a menagerie of sounds, instrumentation, motifs, tempos, and themes".

=== Accolades ===
Back to Basics received a nomination for a Grammy Award for Best Pop Vocal Album at the 49th Annual Grammy Awards (2007) and won Best Female Pop Vocal Performance for "Ain't No Other Man". At the 50th Annual Grammy Awards the following year, "Candyman" was nominated for Best Female Pop Vocal Performance. Back to Basics was named the best pop album of 2006 by iTunes. On June 17, 2008, Entertainment Weekly listed the album at number eighty of the hundred best albums of the last twenty-five years.

== Commercial performance ==
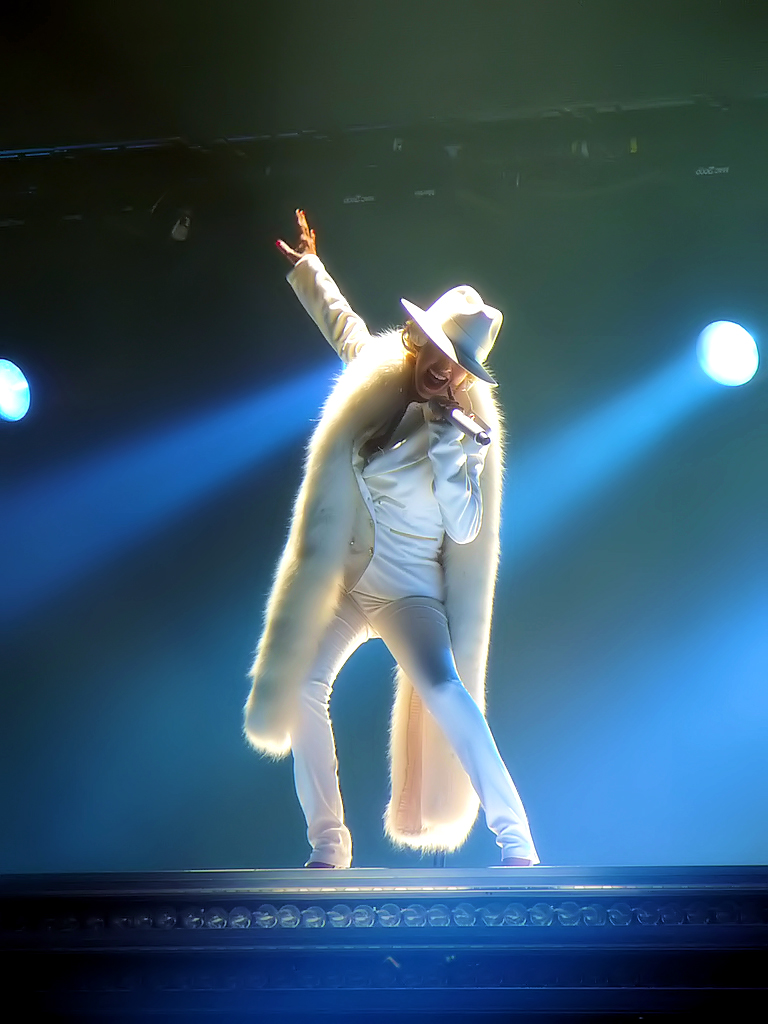
Aguilera performing "Ain't No Other Man" during the Back to Basics Tour; the song peaked at number six on the US Billboard Hot 100, and reached the top five of record charts of several countries

Upon its release, Back to Basics reached number one in over fifteen countries, including the United States, the United Kingdom, and Australia. With 346,000 copies sold in its first week, the album debuted atop the US Billboard 200, being Aguilera's second number-one album after her self-titled debut album (1999) and her highest debut-week sales. It remained on the chart for forty-four weeks, falling off after a final position of number 164. The album was ranked at numbers fifty-nine and seventy-three on the Billboard 200 year-end charts in 2006 and 2007, respectively. Additionally, Back to Basics debuted at number two on the Top R&B/Hip-Hop Albums, spending forty-six weeks on the chart. The album went on to be certified double platinum by the Recording Industry Association of America (RIAA) for sales of two million units in the United States. As of 2014, it has sold 1,712,000 copies in the country. With first-week sales of 24,000, Back to Basics also debuted at number one on the Canadian Albums Chart. It was certified triple platinum in the country, selling over 300,000 copies.

Back to Basics achieved similar success in Europe, peaking at number one on the European Top 100 Albums. In the United Kingdom, it became Aguilera's first album to debut atop the UK Albums Chart. It charted for thirty-three weeks within the top seventy-five, and was eventually certified double platinum in the country by the British Phonographic Industry (BPI). The album placed at numbers fifty-six and one-hundred-and-twenty-seven on the year-end UK Albums Chart in 2006 and 2007, respectively. In Finland, Back to Basics charted for eighteen weeks on the Suomen virallinen lista, peaking at number six. It debuted at number ten on the French Albums Chart, where it spent fifty-two weeks. The album proved be less successful in Portugal, where it peaked at number twenty-six and charted for two weeks. It was among the ten best-selling albums of 2007 in Russia.

The album achieved success in major markets in Oceania. It debuted at number one on the Australian Albums Chart and charted for forty weeks, while debuting at number two on the New Zealand Albums Chart and charting for twenty-seven weeks. The album reached numbers forty-five and thirty-four on Australian year-end charts in 2006 and 2007, respectively; while charting at number forty-three in New Zealand in 2007. Back to Basics went on the reach double platinum certification in the former and platinum in the latter. Back to Basics debuted at number seven on the Oricon Albums Chart in Japan with first-week sales of 32,241 units. It was later certified gold by the Recording Industry Association of Japan (RIAJ) for shipments of 100,000 copies. It debuted at number one on the Taiwanese Albums Chart, as reported by Five Music in August 2006. According to RCA Records frontman Clive Davis, the album has sold approximately five million copies worldwide as of November 2013.

== Track listing ==
Credits adapted from the liner notes of Back to Basics.

Disc one
No.	Title	Writer(s)	Producer(s)	Length
1.	"Intro (Back to Basics)"	Christina Aguilera; Chris E. Martin; Kara DioGuardi; Roy Hawkins; Rick Darnell	DJ Premier; Aguilera^{[a]}	1:47
2.	"Makes Me Wanna Pray" (featuring Steve Winwood)	Aguilera; DioGuardi; Rich Harrison; Winwood	Harrison; Aguilera^{[a]}	4:10
3.	"Back in the Day"	Aguilera; Martin; DioGuardi; Don Costa; Jimmy Castor; Langdon Fridle, Jr.; Douglas Gibson; Harry Jensen; Robert Manigault; Gerald Thomas	DJ Premier; Aguilera^{[a]}	4:13
4.	"Ain't No Other Man"	Aguilera; Martin; DioGuardi; Charles Martin Roane; Harold Beatty	DJ Premier; Roane^{[b]}; Aguilera^{[a]}; Rob Lewis^{[c]}	3:49
5.	"Understand"	Aguilera; DioGuardi; Kwamé Holland; Allen Toussaint	Kwamé	3:46
6.	"Slow Down Baby"	Aguilera; Mark Ronson; DioGuardi; Raymond Angry; William Guest; Merald Knight; Edward Patten; Gladys Knight; Marvin Bernard; Michael Harper; Curtis Jackson	Ronson; Aguilera^{[a]}	3:29
7.	"Oh Mother"	Aguilera; Derryck Thornton; Mark Rankin; Liz Thornton; DioGuardi; Bruno Coulais; Christophe Barratier	Big Tank; Q; L Boggie^{[b]}; Aguilera^{[a]}	3:47
8.	"F.U.S.S." (Interlude)	Aguilera; Roane; DioGuardi	Roane; Aguilera^{[a]}	2:21
9.	"On Our Way"	Aguilera; D. Thornton; Rankin; L. Thornton; DioGuardi	Big Tank; Q; L Boggie^{[b]}; Aguilera^{[a]}	3:37
10.	"Without You"	Aguilera; DioGuardi; Ronson; Lewis	Ronson; Aguilera^{[a]}	3:57
11.	"Still Dirrty"	Aguilera; Martin; DioGuardi	DJ Premier; Aguilera^{[a]}	3:46
12.	"Here to Stay"	Aguilera; Heather Holley; Tony Reyes; Ben H. Allen; George Henry Jackson	Reyes; Allen; Aguilera^{[a]}	3:20
13.	"Thank You (Dedication to Fans...)"	Aguilera; Martin; DioGuardi; Pamela Sheyne; David Frank; Steve Kipner	DJ Premier; Aguilera^{[a]}	4:59
Total length:				46:55

All tracks are written by Aguilera and Linda Perry, and produced by Perry, except where noted (disc two).

Disc two
No.	Title	Length
1.	"Enter the Circus"	1:42
2.	"Welcome" (additionally written by Ronson, and Paul Ill)	2:43
3.	"Candyman"	3:14
4.	"Nasty Naughty Boy"	4:45
5.	"I Got Trouble"	3:42
6.	"Hurt" (additionally written by Ronson)	4:03
7.	"Mercy on Me"	4:33
8.	"Save Me from Myself" (additionally written by Bill Bottrell)	3:13
9.	"The Right Man"	3:51
Total length:		31:47

=== Notes ===
- ^{^[a]} signifies an additional producer
- ^{^[b]} signifies a co-producer
- ^{^[c]} signifies a vocal producer
- Physical edition includes the 10 minute bonus video Back to Basics.
- Premium package edition includes a bonus vinyl with the tracks "Ain't No Other Man" and "Back in the Day".
- Walmart exclusive edition includes a bonus DVD featuring a documentary, music videos for "Ain't No Other Man" and "Hurt", a live performance of "Hurt" at the MTV Video Music Awards, and behind the scenes footage from the album photo shoot.
- Special edition includes a bonus DVD featuring live in London performances of "Ain't No Other Man", "Candyman", and "Beautiful".
- Tour edition includes a bonus DVD featuring music videos for "Ain't No Other Man", "Hurt", and "Candyman", along with a behind the scenes featurette titled "Making of Candyman".

=== Sampling credits ===
- "Intro (Back to Basics)" contains a sample of "The Thrill Is Gone (Live)", as performed by B.B. King, The Crusaders and The Royal Philharmonic Orchestra.
- "Makes Me Wanna Pray" contains a sample of the Traffic instrumental "Glad" (from their 1970 album John Barleycorn Must Die), with member Steve Winwood credited as a featured artist.
- "Back in the Day" contains samples from "Charley", as performed by Don Costa Orchestra, and "Troglodyte", as performed by The Jimmy Castor Bunch.
- "Ain't No Other Man" contains samples from "Happy Skippy Moon Strut", as performed by Moon People, and "The Cissy's Thang", as performed by The Soul Seven.
- "Understand" contains a sample from "Nearer to You", as performed by Betty Harris.
- "Slow Down Baby" contains samples from "Window Raisin' Granny", as performed by Gladys Knight & the Pips and "So Seductive", as performed by Tony Yayo.
- "Oh Mother" contains a sample from "Vois Sur Ton Chemin", written by Bruno Coulais and Christopher Barratler.
- "On Our Way" contains a sample from "Sentimentale", as performed by Claude Bolling.
- "Here to Stay" contains a sample from "The Best Thing You Ever Had", as performed by Candi Staton.
- "Thank You (Dedication to Fans...)" contains samples from "Can't Hold Us Down" and "Genie in a Bottle", as performed by Aguilera, and "Think Big", as performed by Pudgie the Fat Bastard featuring The Notorious B.I.G. The track also features fan club recordings by Shane Burrows, Jessica Cavanaugh, She-Tara Franklin, Michael Holmin, Warren Keller, Antoinette Litte, Gustavo Medina, Sarah Anne Moore, Joshua Pospisil, Cory Steale, Durant Searcy, Samantha Silver, Tammy Simpson and Shanna Nicole Wiles.
- "Candyman" contains a sample from "Tarzan & Jane Swingin' on a Vine" from Run to Cadence with U.S. Marines.

== Personnel ==
Credits adapted from AllMusic.

- Christina Aguilera – vocals, background vocals, songwriting, executive producer (tracks 1–4, 6–13 from disc one)
- Jim McMillen – trombone
- Chris Tedesco – trumpet, horn contractor
- Ray Herrmann – saxophone
- Glen Berger – saxophone
- Tracie Burton – vocal scratches ("Back in the Day")
- Kara DioGuardi – vocal scratches ("Back in the Day")
- DJ Premier – vocal scratches ("Back in the Day"), management of production of sound, engineer
- Paul Ill – bass
- Rob Lewis – guitar, bass, vocal producer
- Linda Perry – piano, guitar, bass, mellotron, songwriting, engineer, art direction and design, management of production of sound
- Tony Reyes – bass, keyboards
- Mark Ronson – guitar, bass, keyboards
- Francis Senger – double bass
- Jason Torreano – double bass
- Bill Bottrell – guitar
- Eric Schermerhorn – guitar
- Jordan Laws – mixing assistant
- Brian Gardner – mastering
- Oscar Ramirez – engineer
- Charles Martin Roane – engineer
- Kristofer Kaufman – assistant engineer
- Alan Mason – assistant engineer
- Chris Wonzer – assistant engineer
- Kwamé – management of production of sound
- Rich Harrison – management of production of sound
- Mark Ronson – management of production of sound, engineer
- Big Tank – management of production of sound
- Q – management of production of sound
- Ellen von Unwerth – photography

== Charts ==
=== Weekly charts ===
Chart (2006)	Peak position
Australian Albums (ARIA)	1
Austrian Albums (Ö3 Austria)	1
Belgian Albums (Ultratop Flanders)	2
Belgian Albums (Ultratop Wallonia)	4
Canadian Albums (Billboard)	1
Croatian International Albums (HDU)	1
Czech Albums (ČNS IFPI)	4
Danish Albums (Hitlisten)	2
Dutch Albums (Album Top 100)	1
European Albums (Billboard)	1
Finnish Albums (Suomen virallinen lista)	6
French Albums (SNEP)	10
German Albums (Offizielle Top 100)	1
Greek Albums (IFPI)	5
Hungarian Albums (MAHASZ)	3
Irish Albums (IRMA)	1
Italian Albums (FIMI)	3
Japanese Albums (Oricon)	7
Mexican Albums (Top 100 Mexico)	2
New Zealand Albums (RMNZ)	2
Norwegian Albums (VG-lista)	4
Polish Albums (ZPAV)	9
Portuguese Albums (AFP)	26
Scottish Albums (Official Charts)	1
Singaporean Albums (RIAS)	1
Spanish Albums (Promusicae)	5
Swedish Albums (Sverigetopplistan)	2
Swiss Albums (Schweizer Hitparade)	1
Taiwanese Western Albums (Five Music)	1
UK Albums (Official Charts)	1
UK R&B Albums (OCC)	1
US Billboard 200	1
US Top Internet Albums (Billboard)	1
US Top R&B/Hip-Hop Albums (Billboard)	2

=== Year-end charts ===
Chart (2006)	Position
Australian Albums (ARIA)	45
Austrian Albums (Ö3 Austria)	27
Belgian Albums (Ultratop Flanders)	43
Dutch Albums (MegaCharts)	42
European Albums (Billboard)	34
French Albums (SNEP)	120
German Albums (Offizielle Top 100)	45
Greek Foreign Albums (IFPI)	34
Hungarian Albums (MAHASZ)	63
Italian Albums (FIMI)	97
Mexican Albums (Top 100 Mexico)	54
Mexico English Albums (Top 100 Mexico)	15
Swedish Albums (Sverigetopplistan)	37
Swiss Albums (Schweizer Hitparade)	16
UK Albums (OCC)	56
US Billboard 200	59
US Top R&B/Hip-Hop Albums (Billboard)	60
Worldwide Albums (IFPI)	15

Chart (2007)	Position
Australian Albums (ARIA)	34
Austrian Albums (Ö3 Austria)	43
Belgian Albums (Ultratop Flanders)	85
Belgian Albums (Ultratop Wallonia)	92
Dutch Albums (MegaCharts)	88
French Albums (SNEP)	109
Hungarian Albums (MAHASZ)	59
New Zealand Albums (RMNZ)	43
Russian Albums (2M)	10
Swiss Albums (Schweizer Hitparade)	53
UK Albums (OCC)	127
US Billboard 200	73
US Top R&B/Hip-Hop Albums (Billboard)	67

== Certifications and sales ==
Region	Certification	Certified units/sales
Australia (ARIA)	2× Platinum	140,000^{^}
Austria (IFPI Austria)	Gold	15,000^{*}
Belgium (BRMA)	Platinum	50,000^{*}
Brazil (Pro-Música Brasil)	Gold	
Canada (Music Canada)	3× Platinum	300,000^{^}
Denmark (IFPI Danmark)	Gold	20,000^{^}
France (SNEP)	Gold	75,000^{*}
Germany (BVMI)	3× Gold	300,000^{‡}
Hungary (MAHASZ)	Platinum	10,000^{^}
Ireland (IRMA)	3× Platinum	45,000^{^}
Italy (FIMI)	Gold	40,000^{*}
Japan (RIAJ)	Gold	100,000^{^}
Mexico (AMPROFON)	Gold	50,000^{‡}
Netherlands (NVPI)	Gold	35,000^{^}
New Zealand (RMNZ)	Platinum	15,000^{^}
Poland (ZPAV)	Gold	10,000^{*}
Russia (NFPF)	3× Platinum	60,000^{*}
South Korea	—	11,514 (Note: South Korean sales as of August 2006 according to the Korea Music Content Industry Association.)
Sweden (GLF)	Gold	30,000^{^}
Switzerland (IFPI Switzerland)	Platinum	30,000^{^}
United Kingdom (BPI)	2× Platinum	600,000^{‡}
United States (RIAA)	2× Platinum	2,000,000^{‡}
Summaries
Europe (IFPI)	Platinum	1,000,000^{*}
^{*} Sales figures based on certification alone.^{^} Shipments figures based on certification alone.^{‡} Sales+streaming figures based on certification alone.

== Release history ==
List of release dates, showing region, format(s), label(s) and reference(s)
Region	Date	Format(s)	Label(s)	Ref.
Japan	August 9, 2006	CD	Sony BMG	
Germany	August 11, 2006	CD	Sony BMG	
Italy	August 11, 2006	CD	Sony BMG	
Australia	August 12, 2006	CD	Sony BMG	
France	August 14, 2006	CD	Sony BMG	
Poland	August 14, 2006	CD	Sony BMG	
Portugal	August 14, 2006	CD	Sony BMG	
United Kingdom	August 14, 2006	CD	RCA	
Canada	August 15, 2006	CD	Sony BMG	
New Zealand	August 15, 2006	CD	Sony BMG	
United States	August 15, 2006	CD	RCA	
Denmark	August 16, 2006	CD	Sony BMG	
Finland	August 16, 2006	CD	Sony BMG	
Norway	August 16, 2006	CD	Sony BMG	
Sweden	August 16, 2006	CD	Sony BMG	
Taiwan	August 18, 2006	CD	Sony BMG	
United States	October 15, 2006	LP	RCA	
Germany	October 27, 2006	LP	Sony BMG	
United Kingdom	November 6, 2006	LP	RCA	
