= Back to Basics: Live and Down Under =

Video by Christina Aguilera
- Released: February 4, 2008
- Recorded: July 17–18, 2007
- Venue: Adelaide Entertainment Centre (Adelaide, Australia)
- Length: 130 minutes
- Label: RCA
- Director: Christina Aguilera; Hamish Hamilton
- Producer: Christina Aguilera; Ian Stewart

Christina Aguilera chronology
Stripped Live in the U.K. (2004)	Back to Basics: Live and Down Under (2008)

Back to Basics: Live and Down Under is the fourth video album by American singer-songwriter Christina Aguilera. It premiered on television on January 26, 2008, on VH1, and was released on DVD on February 4, 2008, by RCA Records. The DVD included material from recordings from two of Aguilera's concerts during her Back to Basics Tour in Adelaide on July 17 and 18, 2007. Behind-the-scenes footage is included with video from the concerts.

Upon its release, Back to Basics: Live and Down Under garnered positive views from music critics as well as attained chart success in a number of countries, peaking at number one on the DVD charts of Belgium (Flanders) and the United Kingdom. In the United States, the DVD debuted atop the chart with first-week sales of 18,437 copies. It achieved double platinum certification by the Australian Recording Industry Association (ARIA) and gold certification by Recording Industry Association of America (RIAA).

== Background and release ==
To support Back to Basics (2006), Aguilera embarked on the worldwide concert Back to Basics Tour. The tour received mixed to positive reviews from music critics; The Georgia Straight's Mike Usinger praised Aguilera's vocals as "insanely powerful", while Dave Simpson from The Guardian criticized the setlist as "confusing". The show in Adelaide, Australia on July 17 and 18, 2007 was filmed and was released as a DVD.

On January 26, 2008, Back to Basics: Live and Down Under made it premiere on VH1 at 10 PM. The DVD was released officially on February 4, 2008, in the United Kingdom. The next day, it was released in Canada and the United States. In Germany, it was released on February 8, 2008. It was released on February 11 in France, and on February 16 in Australia. The DVD features old-school style materials such as trapeze artists, circus jugglers, and cabaret dancing. It also includes behind-the-scene interviews with dancers, musicians, stylists, Aguilera's husband Jordan Bratman and the singer herself.

== Critical response ==
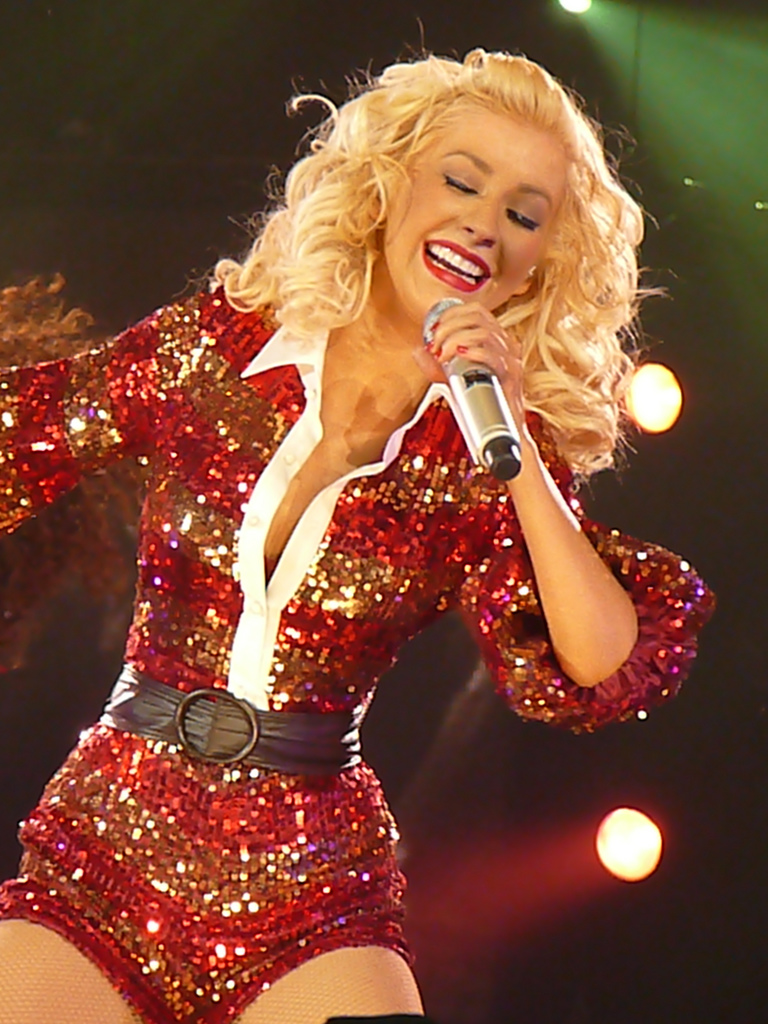
Aguilera performing on the Back to Basics Tour in 2006

Upon its release, Back to Basics: Live and Down Under garnered mainly positive feedback from music critics. Jake Meaney for PopMatters gave it a seven out of ten stars rating, commenting it "huge and overwhelming, deeply soulful and expressive, if sometimes a bit unsubtly melismatic". Clayton Perry from the online website Blogcritics provided a positive review, writing that it "is more than a simple presentation of song and dance; the show, by all measures, is a Broadway-caliber production". The New York Times was also impressed toward the video release, writing that it is "at the top of her already speaker-blowing vocal range".

== Commercial performance ==
On February 25, 2008, the DVD debuted and peaked at number 2 on the ARIA Music DVD Chart, where it remained its peak for two weeks. On the Austrian Music DVD Chart, it debuted at number 7 on the issue chart dated February 22, 2008. The following week, it fell to number 8. The DVD reached its peak at number 6 on March 14, 2008. In the Wallonia region of Belgium, Live and Down Under made its first chart appearance at number 10 on February 16, 2008. It subsequently peaked at number 8 the following week. In the Flanders region, the DVD peaked atop the chart on March 1, 2008, after two weeks charting within the top 10.

In New Zealand, it peaked at number 7 on the RIANZ DVD Chart and remained in the top ten for one week. It also peaked at number 6 in Austria, number 4 in Switzerland, number 2 in Dutch, and atop the chart of United Kingdom. In the United States, Back to Basics: Live and Down Under debuted at number one on the Billboard Top Music Videos chart on February 23, 2008, with first-week sales of 18,437 copies. It fell to number 3 the following week. On March 8, 2008, the DVD fell to number 4.

The DVD was certified gold by the Recording Industry Association of America (RIAA) for shipments of 50,000 copies in the United States. It was certified double platinum by the Australian Recording Industry Association (ARIA) for exceeding shipments of 30,000 copies in Australia.

== Track listing ==
- Credits adapted from DVD liner notes

No.	Title	Writer(s)	Length
1.	"Intro (Back to Basics)"	Christina Aguilera; Christopher Martin; Kara DioGuardi; Roy Hawkins; Rick Darnell	2:01
2.	"Ain't No Other Man"	Aguilera; Martin; DioGuardi; Charles Roane; Harold Beatty	4:18
3.	"Back in the Day"	Aguilera; Martin; DioGuardi; Don Costa; Jimmy Castor; Langdon Fridle Jr.; Douglas Gibson; Harry Jensen; Robert Manigault; Gerald Thomas	5:08
4.	"Understand"	Aguilera; DioGuardi; Kwamé Holland; Allen Toussaint	5:03
5.	"Come On Over Baby (All I Want Is You)"	Paul Rein; Johan Aberg	3:39
6.	"Slow Down Baby"	Aguilera; Mark Ronson; DioGuardi; Raymond Angry; William Guest; Merald Knight; Edward Patton; Gladys Knight; Marvin Bernard; Michael Harper; Curtis Jackson	3:29
7.	"Still Dirrty"	Aguilera; Martin; DioGuardi	5:13
8.	"I Got Trouble"	Aguilera; Linda Perry	2:34
9.	"Makes Me Wanna Pray"	Aguilera; DioGuardi; Rich Harrison; Steve Winwood	6:03
10.	"What a Girl Wants"	Shelly Peiken; Guy Roche	4:45
11.	"Oh Mother"	Aguilera; Derryck Thornton; Mark Rankin; Liz Thornton; DioGuardi; Bruno Coulais; Christophe Barratier	7:46
12.	"Enter the Circus"	Aguilera; Perry	1:46
13.	"Welcome"	Aguilera; Perry; Ronson; Paul Ill	2:38
14.	"Dirrty"	Aguilera; Dana Stinson; Balewa Muhammad; Reginald Noble	5:06
15.	"Candyman"	Aguilera; Perry	4:42
16.	"Nasty Naughty Boy"	Aguilera; Perry	5:46
17.	"Hurt"	Aguilera; Perry; Ronson	4:29
18.	"Lady Marmalade"	Bob Crewe; Kenny Nolan	5:10
19.	"Encore: Thank You"	Aguilera; Martin; DioGuardi; Pamela Sheyne; David Frank; Steve Kipner	2:33
20.	"Beautiful"	Perry	4:56
21.	"Fighter"	Aguilera; Scott Storch	8:24

=== Bonus content ===
1. "Dancers"
2. "Wardrobe: Simone Harouche"
3. "Hair & Make-Up: Stephen Sollitto"
4. "Musicians"
1. "Background Vocalists"
2. "Musical Director: Rob Lewis"
3. "Jordan Bratman"
4. "Christina Aguilera"

== Personnel ==
- Christina Aguilera – vocals, primary artist, creative director
- Hamish Hamilton – director
- Sasha Allen, Erika Jerry – background vocals
- Irving Azoff, Kelly Perkins, Harry Sandler – management
- Errol Cooney – guitar
- Ethan Farmer – bass
- Irene Fukunaga – executive assistant
- Miguel Gandelman – saxophone
- James Glader – photography
- Jean-Pierre Leloir – photo courtesy
- Rob Lewis – music direction
- Peter Mokran – mixing
- Raymond "Ez" Monteiro – trumpet
- Garret Smith – trombone
- Eric Weaver – assistant
- Chris Woehrle – design

Credits adapted from AllMusic.

== Charts ==
=== Weekly charts ===
Chart (2008)	Peak position
Australia (ARIA Charts)	2
Austria (IFPI)	6
Belgium (Flanders Chart)	1
Belgium (Wallonia Chart)	8
Italy (FIMI)	6
Japan (Japanese DVD Chart)	76
Mexico (AMPROFON)	5
Netherlands (Dutch Music DVD Top 10)	2
New Zealand (RIANZ)	7
Portugal (AFP)	19
Sweden (Sverigetopplistan)	2
Switzerland (Schweizer Hitparade)	4
UK DVDs (Official Charts Company)	1
US Billboard Top Music Videos	1

=== Year-end charts ===
Chart (2008)	Position
Australian Music DVD Chart (ARIA)	32
Belgian Music DVD Chart (Ultratop Flanders)	26
Dutch Music DVD Chart (MegaCharts)	34

== Certifications ==
Region	Certification	Certified units/sales
Australia (ARIA)	2× Platinum	30,000^{^}
United States (RIAA)	Gold	50,000^{^}
^{^} Shipments figures based on certification alone.

== Release history ==
Country	Release date	Format	Label
United Kingdom	February 4, 2008	DVD	RCA Records
Canada	February 5, 2008	DVD	RCA Records
United States	February 5, 2008	DVD	RCA Records
Germany	February 8, 2008	DVD	RCA Records
France	February 11, 2008	DVD	RCA Records
Australia	February 16, 2008	DVD	Sony Music Entertainment
