= List of awards and nominations received by Christina Aguilera =

Christina Aguilera awards and nominations
- Aguilera in Rio de Janeiro, 2025
Awards and nominations
Award	Wins	Nominations
Golden Globe Awards	0	1
Grammy Awards	5	21
Latin Grammy Awards	2	11
ALMA Awards	6	13
ASCAP Awards	4	4
Billboard Latin Music Awards	3	7
GLAAD Media Awards	2	0

Totals (Note: Certain award groups do not simply award one winner. They acknowledge several different recipients, have runners-up, and have third place. Since this is a specific recognition and is different from losing an award, runner-up mentions are considered wins in this award tally. For simplification and to avoid errors, each award in this list has been presumed to have had a prior nomination.)
- Wins: 453
- Nominations: 541

Christina Aguilera is an American singer. Aguilera's self-titled debut album spawned three Billboard Hot 100 number-ones singles: "Genie in a Bottle" (1999), "What a Girl Wants" and "Come On Over Baby (All I Want Is You)" (both from 2000). In addition to establishing her as a teen idol, the album earned her prestigious awards, including Female Artist of the Year at the 2000 Billboard Music Awards and Best New Artist at the 2000 Grammy Awards, becoming one of the youngest artists to receive the trophy. In 2000, Aguilera released her first Spanish-language record, Mi Reflejo, and a Christmas album titled My Kind of Christmas. The former received the Latin Grammy Award for Best Female Pop Vocal Album.

For the Moulin Rouge! soundtrack, Aguilera collaborated with Lil' Kim, Mýa and Pink in "Lady Marmalade" (2001), whose music video won two trophies in the 2001 MTV Video Music Awards, including Video of the Year. In the following year, she changed her image and artistic direction with Stripped (2002), incorporating a range of musical styles and a more personal lyrical content for its development. Its commercial success of the project made her to be considered the female artist of the following year through awards ceremonies, including 2003 MTV Europe Music Awards (EMA). With some tracks extracted from the album such as "Dirrty" featuring Redman, "Beautiful" and "Fighter", she was indicated in several international awards, as Echo Music Prize, Juno Awards and Q Awards.

In her fifth studio album, Back to Basics (2006), Aguilera changed her artistic direction again, for which she was praised by professional critics for her "maturity". With the project, she was nominated in the international female category at the BRIT Awards, being honored with the same prize through ceremonies of the GAFFA Awards and NRJ Music Awards. "Ain't No Other Man" and "Candyman" were the songs of the disc chosen to compete on numerous awards, including Grammy Awards, where the foremore was awarded with the Best Female Pop Vocal Performance. In 2010, she starred in Burlesque and collaborated with its soundtrack, with the track "Bound to You" eventually being nominated for the Golden Globe Award for Best Original Song. Posteriorly, Aguilera won other awards in collaboration with Maroon 5 (for "Moves Like Jagger") and A Great Big World (for "Say Something"). Outside of her music works, she owns a line of perfumes with annual releases, for which she has been awarded numerous times at the FiFi Awards, organized by The Fragrance Foundation.

Throughout her career, Aguilera has also accumulated several recognitions; by Rolling Stone and Consequence of Sound lists, she was chosen as one of the greatest vocalists of all time, as well as one of the greatests artists of Latin origin in history by Latina. In addition, she was placed as one of the most important women in the phonographic industry according to VH1 and The Independent. In 2013, Aguilera was elected as one of the 100 most influential people in the world by Time; in addition, Billboard magazine developed articles analyzing her influence on the current pop music scene, while she is often cited as an inspiration for various artists. Since then, she has been honoured with multiple lifetime achievement awards in celebration of her impact, including a star on the Hollywood Walk of Fame, a Disney Legend award by The Walt Disney Company, two "Music Icon Awards" at the 47th People's Choice Awards and 31 Nights of Halloween Fan Fest respectively, a "People's Voice Award" at the 39th People's Choice Awards, a special recognition GLAAD award, a "Spirit of Hope Award" at the 2022 Billboard Latin Music Awards and a special recognition award as "The Voice of a Generation" at the 13th ALMA Awards.

== Awards and nominations ==
Key
†	Indicates non-competitive categories

Award	Year (Note: Indicates the year of ceremony. Each year is linked to the article about the awards held that year, wherever possible.)	Recipient(s)	Category	Result	Ref.
31 Nights of Halloween Fan Fest	2019	Christina Aguilera	Music Icon Award †	Won	
4Music Video Honours	2011	"Moves Like Jagger" (with Maroon 5)	Best Video	Nominated	
ALMA Awards	1999	"Reflection"	Outstanding Performance of a Song for Feature Film	Nominated	
ALMA Awards	2000	Christina Aguilera	New Entertainer of the Year	Won	
ALMA Awards	2000	"Genie in a Bottle"	Outstanding Music Video	Won	
ALMA Awards	2001	My Reflection	Outstanding Music or Awards Special	Nominated	
ALMA Awards	2002	"Lady Marmalade" (with Lil' Kim, Mýa & Pink)	Outstanding Song in a Motion Picture Soundtrack	Won	
ALMA Awards	2002	"Nobody Wants to Be Lonely" (with Ricky Martin)	Outstanding Music Video	Won	
ALMA Awards	2002	2001 Grammy Awards	Outstanding Performance in a Music, Variety or Comedy Special	Nominated	
ALMA Awards	2002	Christina Aguilera	Outstanding Female Performer	Nominated	
ALMA Awards	2011	Christina Aguilera	Outstanding Female Performer	Nominated	
ALMA Awards	2011	Burlesque	Favorite Movie Actress – Comedy/Musical	Nominated	
ALMA Awards	2011	The Voice	Favorite TV Reality, Variety or Comedy Personality	Nominated	
ALMA Awards	2012	The Voice	Favorite TV Reality, Variety or Comedy Personality	Won	
ALMA Awards	2012	Christina Aguilera	Special Achievement Award – "The Voice of a Generation" †	Won	
American Music Awards	2001	Christina Aguilera	Favorite Pop/Rock Female Artist	Nominated	
American Music Awards	2003	Christina Aguilera	International Artist of the Year	Nominated	
AMFT Awards	2013	"Say Something" (with A Great Big World)	Best Pop Duo/Group Performance	Won	
AMFT Awards	2018	"Twice"	Best Pop Solo Performance	Won	
APRA Awards (Australia)	2004	"Beautiful"	Most Performed Foreign Work	Nominated	
APRA Awards (Australia)	2012	"Moves Like Jagger" (with Maroon 5)	International Work of the Year	Nominated	
ARTISTdirect Online Music Awards	2000	Christina Aguilera	Favorite Female Artist	Nominated	
ARTISTdirect Online Music Awards	2000	Christina Aguilera	Favorite Bad Girl	Nominated	
ARTISTdirect Online Music Awards	2000	Christina Aguilera	Sexiest Female	Nominated	
ARTISTdirect Online Music Awards	2000	Christina Aguilera	Coolest Artist with Dyed Hair	Nominated	
ARTISTdirect Online Music Awards	2000	Christina Aguilera	Best Official Site	Nominated	
ARTISTdirect Online Music Awards	2000	Christina Aguilera	Favorite Turn It Up Loud CD	Nominated	
Basenotes Fragrance Awards	2008	Simply Christina	Best Celebrity Women's Fragrance	Nominated	
Best of Las Vegas Awards	2020	Christina Aguilera: The Xperience	Best Bachelorette Party	Nominated	
Best of Las Vegas Awards	2020	Christina Aguilera: The Xperience	Best Production Show	Nominated	
Best of Las Vegas Awards	2020	Christina Aguilera: The Xperience	Best Resident Performer	Nominated	
BDSCertified Spin Awards	2002	"Come On Over Baby (All I Want Is You)"	200,000 Spins	Won	
BDSCertified Spin Awards	2002	"Dirrty" (featuring Redman)	50,000 Spins	Won	
BDSCertified Spin Awards	2003	"Can't Hold Us Down" (featuring Lil' Kim)	100,000 Spins	Won	
BDSCertified Spin Awards	2003	"Fighter"	100,000 Spins	Won	
BDSCertified Spin Awards	2003	"Beautiful"	300,000 Spins	Won	
BDSCertified Spin Awards	2004	"Beautiful"	400,000 Spins	Won	
BDSCertified Spin Awards	2004	"The Voice Within"	50,000 Spins	Won	
BDSCertified Spin Awards	2005	"Dirrty" (featuring Redman)	100,000 Spins	Won	
BDSCertified Spin Awards	2006	"Beautiful"	500,000 Spins	Won	
BDSCertified Spin Awards	2006	"Lady Marmalade" (with Lil' Kim, Mýa and Pink)	300,000 Spins	Won	
BDSCertified Spin Awards	2006	"Ain't No Other Man"	100,000 Spins	Won	
BDSCertified Spin Awards	2006	"Ain't No Other Man"	50,000 Spins	Won	
BDSCertified Spin Awards	2006	"Hurt"	50,000 Spins	Won	
BDSCertified Spin Awards	2007	"Ain't No Other Man"	200,000 Spins	Won	
BDSCertified Spin Awards	2007	"Tell Me" (with Diddy)	50,000 Spins	Won	
BDSCertified Spin Awards	2007	"Hurt"	100,000 Spins	Won	
BDSCertified Spin Awards	2010	"Beautiful"	500,000 Spins	Won	
Billboard Latin Music Awards	2001	Mi Reflejo	Pop Album of the Year, Female	Won	
Billboard Latin Music Awards	2001	Mi Reflejo	Pop Album of the Year, New Artist	Won	
Billboard Latin Music Awards	2001	Christina Aguilera	Billboard Latin 50 Artist of the Year	Nominated	
Billboard Latin Music Awards	2014	Christina Aguilera	Crossover Artist of the Year	Nominated	
Billboard Latin Music Awards	2014	Christina Aguilera	Hot Latin Songs Artist of the Year, Female	Nominated	
Billboard Latin Music Awards	2014	"Hoy Tengo Ganas de Ti" (with Alejandro Fernández)	Hot Latin Song of the Year	Nominated	
Billboard Latin Music Awards	2022	Christina Aguilera	Spirit of Hope Award †	Won	
Billboard Music Awards	1999	Christina Aguilera	Top New Female Artist	Nominated	
Billboard Music Awards	2000	Christina Aguilera	Female Artist of the Year	Won	
Billboard Music Awards	2000	Christina Aguilera	Top Hot 100 Artist	Nominated	
Billboard Music Awards	2000	Christina Aguilera	Artist of the Year	Nominated	
Billboard Music Awards	2003	Christina Aguilera	Female Artist of the Year	Nominated	
Billboard Music Awards	2003	"Beautiful"	Single of the Year	Nominated	
Billboard Music Awards	2012	"Moves Like Jagger" (with Maroon 5)	Top Hot 100 Song	Nominated	
Billboard Music Awards	2012	"Moves Like Jagger" (with Maroon 5)	Top Digital Song	Nominated	
Billboard Music Awards	2012	"Moves Like Jagger" (with Maroon 5)	Top Pop Song	Nominated	
Billboard Music Awards	2012	"Moves Like Jagger" (with Maroon 5)	Top Radio Song	Nominated	
Billboard Music Video Awards	1999	"Genie In a Bottle"	Maximum Vision Award	Nominated	
Billboard Music Video Awards	1999	"Genie In a Bottle"	Best New Artist Dance Clip	Nominated	
Billboard Music Video Awards	1999	"Genie In a Bottle"	Best Dance Clip	Nominated	
Billboard Music Video Awards	1999	"Genie In a Bottle"	Best New Artist Pop Clip	Nominated	
Billboard Music Video Awards	2000	"Ven Conmigo (Solamente Tú)"	Best Latin New Artist Clip of the Year	Won	
Billboard Music Video Awards	2001	"Lady Marmalade" (with Lil' Kim, Mýa & Pink)	Best Dance Clip of the Year	Nominated	
Billboard Touring Awards	2007	Back to Basics Tour	Breakthrough Artist	Nominated	
Billboard Touring Awards	2007	Back to Basics Tour	Top Package	Nominated	
Blender Awards	2003	Christina Aguilera	Woman of the Year	Won	
Blockbuster Entertainment Awards	2000	"Genie in a Bottle"	Favorite Single	Won	
Blockbuster Entertainment Awards	2000	Christina Aguilera	Favorite New Female Artist	Won	
Blockbuster Entertainment Awards	2001	Christina Aguilera	Favorite Female Artist of the Year	Won	
Blockbuster Entertainment Awards	2001	Christina Aguilera	Favorite Latin Artist	Won	
BMI London Awards	2014	"Feel This Moment" (with Pitbull)	Most Performed Song	Won	
BMI Pop Awards	2002	"Come On Over Baby (All I Want Is You)"	Most Performed Song	Won	
BMI Pop Awards	2004	"Miss Independent"	Most Performed Song	Won	
BMI Pop Awards	2008	"Ain't No Other Man"	Most Performed Song	Won	
BMI Pop Awards	2008	"Hurt"	Most Performed Song	Won	
BMI Pop Awards	2014	"Feel This Moment" (with Pitbull)	Most Performed Song	Won	
Bravo Otto Awards (Germany)	1999	Christina Aguilera	Best Female Singer	Silver	
Bravo Otto Awards (Germany)	2002	Christina Aguilera	Best Female Singer	Bronze	
Bravo Otto Awards (Germany)	2003	Christina Aguilera	Best Female Singer	Silver	
Bravo Otto Awards (Germany)	2004	Christina Aguilera	Best Female Singer	Bronze	
Bravo Otto Awards (Germany)	2006	Christina Aguilera	Best Female Singer	Bronze	
Bravo Otto Awards (Hungary)	2007	Christina Aguilera	Best Female Singer	Nominated	
Bravo Otto Awards (Hungary)	2007	Back to Basics	Best Album	Nominated	
Bravo Otto Awards (Hungary)	2007	"Candyman"	Best Music Video	Won	
Bravoora	2004	Christina Aguilera	Best Female Pop Singer	Nominated	
Brit Awards	2004	Stripped	International Album	Nominated	
Brit Awards	2004	Christina Aguilera	International Female Solo Artist	Nominated	
Brit Awards	2004	Christina Aguilera	Pop Act	Nominated	
Brit Awards	2007	Christina Aguilera	International Female Solo Artist	Nominated	
British Arrows	2023	"Beautiful"	Best Music Video — Craft Bronze	Won	
BT Digital Music Awards	2010	Bionic	Best Artistic Promotion	Nominated	
Capital FM's Music Video Awards	2013	"Your Body"	Best Music Video Kiss Scene	Nominated	
CelebMix Awards	2022	"Beautiful"	Cybersmiler of the Month (Note: The award was given to Aguilera for "highlighting the importance of self-worth" after the 2022 music video for "Beautiful" was released.)	Won	
CEW Beauty Awards	2011	Christina Aguilera (Fragrance)	Women's Scent Mass	Won	
Channel [V] Thailand Music Video Awards	2002	"Lady Marmalade" (with Lil' Kim, Mýa & Pink)	Popular Duo/Group Video	Won	
Channel [V] Thailand Music Video Awards	2003	"Beautiful"	Popular Female Video	Won	
Chicago Indie Critics Awards	2021	"Loyal Brave True"	Best Original Song	Nominated	
Clio Awards	2024	"Beautiful" (2022 Version)	61 Seconds to Five Minutes	Gold	
CosmoGirl! Awards	2000	Christina Aguilera	CosmoGIRL! of the Year	Nominated	
Cosmopolitan Awards	2023	Playground — (shared award)	Best Water-Based Lube	Won	
Cosmopolitan Awards	2024	Playground — (shared award)	Best Water-Based Lube	Won	
Cosmopolitan Fragrance Awards	2009	Inspire	Best Celebrity Fragrance for Women	Won	
Daily Mirror Music Awards	2007	Christina Aguilera	International Artist of the Year	Won	
Daily Mirror Music Awards	2007	Back to Basics	International Album of the Year	Won	
DanceStar Awards	2004	"Beautiful (Peter Rauhofer Remix)"	Best Remix	Nominated	
Disney Channel Kids Awards	2003	Christina Aguilera	Best Female	Nominated	
Do Something Awards	2010	Christina Aguilera	Social Action	Won	
Dolly Teen Choice Awards	2007	"Candyman"	Best Music Video	Won	
EarOne Awards	2009	"Keeps Gettin' Better"	Best Song	Won	
EarOne Awards	2010	"Not Myself Tonight"	Best Song	Won	
EarOne Awards	2011	"Moves Like Jagger" (with Maroon 5)	Best Song	Won	
Echo Music Prize	2004	Christina Aguilera	Best International Rock/Pop Female Artist	Nominated	
Entertainment Weekly Awards	2000	Christina Aguilera	Best Site of the 21st Century	Won	
Entertainment Weekly Awards	2006	Christina Aguilera	Performer of the Year	Won	
Entertainment Weekly Awards	2011	Christina Aguilera	Entertainer of the Year	Won	
FHM Music & TV Awards	2005	"Dirrty" (featuring Redman)	Sexiest Video – Public's Choice	Won	
FiFi Awards (Germany)	2008	Simply Christina	Lifestyle – Women	Won	
FiFi Awards (Germany)	2008	Simply Christina	Public's Choice: Lifestyle – Women	Won	
FiFi Awards (Germany)	2011	Royal Desire	Public's Choice: Lifestyle – Women	Won	
FiFi Awards (Germany)	2011	By Night	Public's Choice: Lifestyle – Women	Won	
FiFi Awards (Germany)	2013	Red Sin	Lifestyle	Won	
FiFi Awards (Germany)	2013	Red Sin	Public's Choice: Lifestyle – Women	Won	
FiFi Awards (Germany)	2014	Unforgettable	Public's Choice: Lifestyle – Women	Won	
FiFi Awards (Germany)	2014	Unforgettable	Lifestyle	Won	
FiFi Awards (United Kingdom)	2008	Simply Christina	Favorite Celebrity Fragrance – Public's Choice	Won	
FiFi Awards (United Kingdom)	2011	Simply Christina	Broad Appeal – Women	Nominated	
FiFi Awards (United Kingdom)	2011	By Night	Broad Appeal – Women	Nominated	
FiFi Awards (United Kingdom)	2012	Royal Desire	Broad Appeal – Women	Won	
FiFi Awards (United Kingdom)	2013	Red Sin	Fragrance of the Year – Women's Popular	Nominated	
Fuse TV Awards	2012	"Your Body"	Video of the Year	Won	
GAFFA Awards	2002	"Dirrty" (featuring Redman)	Best Foreign Music Video	Nominated	
GAFFA Awards	2006	Christina Aguilera	Best Foreign Female Act	Won	
GAFFA Awards	2011	"Moves Like Jagger" (with Maroon 5)	Foreign Song of the Year	Nominated	
GAFFA Awards	2018	Christina Aguilera	International Solo Artist	Nominated	
GAFFA Awards	2018	Liberation	International Album of the Year	Nominated	
Galgalatz Awards	2007	"Candyman"	Song of the Year	3rd place	
Gaon Chart Music Awards	2011	"Moves Like Jagger" (with Maroon 5)	International Song of the Year	Won	
Gaygalan Awards	2012	"Moves Like Jagger" (with Maroon 5)	Foreign Song of the Year	Nominated	
George McGovern Leadership Awards	2012	Christina Aguilera	Leadership Award for Social Action †	Won	
GLAAD Media Awards	2003	Christina Aguilera	Special Recognition Award †	Won	
GLAAD Media Awards	2023	Christina Aguilera	Advocate for Change Award	Won	
Glammy Awards	2011	Royal Desire	Basic Perfume	Won	
Glamour Awards	2004	Christina Aguilera	Woman of the Year	Won	
Glamour Awards	2011	Christina Aguilera	International Musician/Solo Artist	Nominated	
Glamour Awards	2024	Playground — (Shared Award)	Best Lube	Won	
Gold Derby Film Awards	2010	"Bound to You"	Best Original Song	Nominated	
Golden Globe Awards	2011	"Bound to You"	Best Original Song	Nominated	
Grammy Awards	2000	Christina Aguilera	Best New Artist	Won	
Grammy Awards	2000	"Genie in a Bottle"	Best Female Pop Vocal Performance	Nominated	
Grammy Awards	2001	"What a Girl Wants"	Best Female Pop Vocal Performance	Nominated	
Grammy Awards	2001	Mi Reflejo	Best Latin Pop Album	Nominated	
Grammy Awards	2002	"Lady Marmalade" (with Lil' Kim, Mýa & Pink)	Best Pop Collaboration with Vocals	Won	
Grammy Awards	2002	"Nobody Wants to Be Lonely" (with Ricky Martin)	Best Pop Collaboration with Vocals	Nominated	
Grammy Awards	2003	"Dirrty" (featuring Redman)	Best Pop Collaboration with Vocals	Nominated	
Grammy Awards	2004	Stripped	Best Pop Vocal Album	Nominated	
Grammy Awards	2004	"Beautiful"	Best Female Pop Vocal Performance	Won	
Grammy Awards	2004	"Can't Hold Us Down" (featuring Lil' Kim)	Best Pop Collaboration with Vocals	Nominated	
Grammy Awards	2006	"A Song for You" (with Herbie Hancock)	Best Pop Collaboration with Vocals	Nominated	
Grammy Awards	2007	Back to Basics	Best Pop Vocal Album	Nominated	
Grammy Awards	2007	"Ain't No Other Man"	Best Female Pop Vocal Performance	Won	
Grammy Awards	2008	"Candyman"	Best Female Pop Vocal Performance	Nominated	
Grammy Awards	2008	"Steppin' Out" (with Tony Bennett)	Best Pop Collaboration with Vocals	Nominated	
Grammy Awards	2012	Burlesque (with Cher)	Best Compilation Soundtrack for Visual Media	Nominated	
Grammy Awards	2012	"Moves Like Jagger" (with Maroon 5)	Best Pop Duo/Group Performance	Nominated	
Grammy Awards	2015	"Say Something" (with A Great Big World)	Best Pop Duo/Group Performance	Won	
Grammy Awards	2019	"Fall in Line" (featuring Demi Lovato)	Best Pop Duo/Group Performance	Nominated	
Grammy Awards	2019	"Like I Do" (featuring GoldLink)	Best Rap/Sung Collaboration	Nominated	
Grammy Awards	2023	Aguilera	Best Latin Pop Album	Nominated	
Groovevolt Music and Fashion Awards	2004	Stripped	Album of the Year	Won	
Groovevolt Music and Fashion Awards	2004	Stripped	Best Album – Female	Nominated	
Groovevolt Music and Fashion Awards	2004	"Beautiful"	Song of the Year	Won	
Groovevolt Music and Fashion Awards	2004	"Beautiful"	Video of the Year	Won	
Groovevolt Music and Fashion Awards	2004	"Beautiful"	Best Song Performance – Female	Nominated	
Groovevolt Music and Fashion Awards	2004	"Can't Hold Us Down" (featuring Lil' Kim)	Most Fashionable Music Video	Won	
Groovevolt Music and Fashion Awards	2004	"Walk Away"	Best Deep Cut	Nominated	
Hollywood Music in Media Awards	2019	"Haunted Heart"	Best Original Song – Animated Film	Nominated	
Human Rights Campaign	2019	Christina Aguilera	Ally for Equality Award †	Won	
Hungarian Music Awards	2007	Back to Basics	Foreign Pop Album of the Year	Nominated	
Iconic Awards	2019	"Haunted Heart"	Best International Single of the Year	Nominated	
iHeartRadio Music Awards	2019	"Fall In Line" (with Demi Lovato)	Song of the Year	Nominated	
International Dance Music Awards	2007	"Ain't No Other Man"	Best Dance Video	Nominated	
International Dance Music Awards	2007	"Ain't No Other Man"	Best Pop/Dance Track	Nominated	
International Dance Music Awards	2007	"Tell Me" (with Diddy)	Best Hip-Hop/Dance Track	Nominated	
International Dance Music Awards	2012	"Moves Like Jagger" (with Maroon 5)	Best Pop/Dance Track	Nominated	
International Dance Music Awards	2014	"Feel This Moment" (with Pitbull)	Best Latin Dance Track	Won	
International Dance Music Awards	2014	"Feel This Moment" (with Pitbull)	Best Hip-Hop/Dance Track	Nominated	
Japan Gold Disc Awards	2012	Burlesque	Soundtrack of the Year	Won	
Juice TV Awards	2001	"Lady Marmalade" (with Lil' Kim, Mýa & Pink)	Best R&B Video	Won	
Juno Awards	2004	Stripped	International Album of the Year	Nominated	
Juno Awards	2004	"Fighter"	Video of the Year	Won	
Juno Awards	2007	"Hurt"	Video of the Year	Nominated	
Latin American Music Awards	2022	"Santo" (with Ozuna)	Favorite Video	Nominated	
Ladies' Home Journal Awards	1999	Christina Aguilera	Woman of the Year	Won	
Latin Grammy Awards	2000	"Genio Atrapado"	Best Female Pop Vocal Performance	Nominated	
Latin Grammy Awards	2001	"Pero Me Acuerdo de Ti"	Record of the Year	Nominated	
Latin Grammy Awards	2001	Mi Reflejo	Best Female Pop Vocal Album	Won	
Latin Grammy Awards	2022	Aguilera	Album of the Year	Nominated	
Latin Grammy Awards	2022	Aguilera	Best Traditional Pop Vocal Album	Won	
Latin Grammy Awards	2022	"Pa Mis Muchachas"	Record of the Year	Nominated	
Latin Grammy Awards	2022	"Pa Mis Muchachas"	Song of the Year	Nominated	
Latin Grammy Awards	2022	"Pa Mis Muchachas"	Best Urban Fusion/Performance	Nominated	
Latin Grammy Awards	2022	"Santo"	Best Urban Fusion/Performance	Nominated	
Latin Grammy Awards	2022	"Cuando Me Dé la Gana"	Best Regional Mexican Song	Nominated	
Latin Grammy Awards	2023	"No Es Que Te Extrañe"	Record of the Year	Nominated	
Latin Music Italian Awards	2013	"Feel This Moment" (with Pitbull)	Best Latin Song of the Year	Won	
Latina Awards	1999	Christina Aguilera	Artist of the Year	Won	
Latina Awards	2003	Christina Aguilera	Woman of the Year	Won	
LOS40 Music Awards	2012	"Moves Like Jagger" (with Maroon 5)	Best International Song	Nominated	
Los Premios MTV Latinoamérica	2003	Christina Aguilera	Best International Pop Artist	Nominated	
Maxim Awards	2000	Christina Aguilera	Best International Female Singer	Won	
Maxim Awards	2003	Christina Aguilera	Sexiest Woman of the Year	Won	
Maxim Awards	2003	"Dirrty" (featuring Redman)	Best Music Video	Won	
Maxim Awards	2006	"Ain't No Other Man"	Best Music Video	Won	
Meteor Ireland Music Award	2006	Christina Aguilera	Best International Female	Nominated	
MOBO Awards	2003	"Dirrty" (featuring Redman)	Best Video	Won	
MP3 Music Awards	2011	"Moves Like Jagger" (with Maroon 5)	Music Industry Award	Nominated	
MTV Asia Awards	2002	"Lady Marmalade" (with Lil' Kim, Mýa & Pink)	Favorite Video	Nominated	
MTV Asia Awards	2002	Christina Aguilera	Favorite Female Artist	Nominated	
MTV Asia Awards	2004	Christina Aguilera	Favorite Female Artist	Won	
MTV Asia Awards	2004	"Beautiful"	Favorite Video	Nominated	
MTV Asia Awards	2006	Christina Aguilera	Favorite Female Artist	Won	
MTV Australia Awards	2007	Christina Aguilera	Best Female Artist	Nominated	
MTV Australia Awards	2007	"Tell Me" (with Diddy)	Best Hook-Up	Nominated	
MTV Australia Awards	2007	"Ain't No Other Man"	Best Pop Video	Nominated	
MTV Australia Awards	2007	"Ain't No Other Man"	Video of the Year	Nominated	
MTV España Awards	2018	"Fall in Line" (featuring Demi Lovato)	Video of the Summer	Won	
MTV Europe Music Awards	2001	"Lady Marmalade" (with Lil' Kim, Mýa & Pink)	Best Song	Nominated	
MTV Europe Music Awards	2003	"Beautiful"	Best Song	Nominated	
MTV Europe Music Awards	2003	Stripped	Best Album	Nominated	
MTV Europe Music Awards	2003	Christina Aguilera	Best Female	Won	
MTV Europe Music Awards	2003	Christina Aguilera	Best Pop	Nominated	
MTV Europe Music Awards	2006	Christina Aguilera	Best Pop	Nominated	
MTV Europe Music Awards	2006	Christina Aguilera	Best Female	Won	
MTV Europe Music Awards	2006	Back to Basics	Best Album	Nominated	
MTV Europe Music Awards	2007	Christina Aguilera	Best Solo Artist	Nominated	
MTV Europe Music Awards	2008	Christina Aguilera	Best Act Ever	Nominated	
MTV Italian Music Awards	2007	Christina Aguilera	First Lady Award	Nominated	
MTV Italian Music Awards	2011	Christina Aguilera	Hot & Sexy Award	Nominated	
MTV Italian Music Awards	2012	"Moves Like Jagger" (with Maroon 5)	Best Video	Nominated	
MTV Movie Awards	2011	Burlesque	Best Female Breakout Star	Nominated	
MTV Russia Music Awards	2007	Christina Aguilera	Best Foreign Artist	Nominated	
MTV Russia Music Awards	2008	"Keeps Gettin' Better"	Best Video	Nominated	
MTV Video Music Awards	2000	"What a Girl Wants"	Best New Artist in a Video	Nominated	
MTV Video Music Awards	2000	"What a Girl Wants"	Best Female Video	Nominated	
MTV Video Music Awards	2000	"What a Girl Wants"	Best Pop Video	Nominated	
MTV Video Music Awards	2000	"What a Girl Wants"	Viewer's Choice	Nominated	
MTV Video Music Awards	2000	"What a Girl Wants"	Best Choreography in a Video	Nominated	
MTV Video Music Awards	2001	"Lady Marmalade" (with Lil' Kim, Mýa & Pink)	Best Choreography in a Video	Nominated	
MTV Video Music Awards	2001	"Lady Marmalade" (with Lil' Kim, Mýa & Pink)	Best Art Direction in a Video	Nominated	
MTV Video Music Awards	2001	"Lady Marmalade" (with Lil' Kim, Mýa & Pink)	Best Dance Video	Nominated	
MTV Video Music Awards	2001	"Lady Marmalade" (with Lil' Kim, Mýa & Pink)	Video of the Year	Won	
MTV Video Music Awards	2001	"Lady Marmalade" (with Lil' Kim, Mýa & Pink)	Best Video from a Film	Won	
MTV Video Music Awards	2001	"Lady Marmalade" (with Lil' Kim, Mýa & Pink)	Best Pop Video	Nominated	
MTV Video Music Awards	2003	"Dirrty" (featuring Redman)	Best Pop Video	Nominated	
MTV Video Music Awards	2003	"Dirrty" (featuring Redman)	Best Dance Video	Nominated	
MTV Video Music Awards	2003	"Dirrty" (featuring Redman)	Best Choreography in a Video	Nominated	
MTV Video Music Awards	2003	"Dirrty" (featuring Redman)	Best Female Video	Nominated	
MTV Video Music Awards	2004	"The Voice Within"	Best Female Video	Nominated	
MTV Video Music Awards	2004	"The Voice Within"	Viewer's Choice	Nominated	
MTV Video Music Awards	2004	"The Voice Within"	Best Cinematography in a Video	Nominated	
MTV Video Music Awards	2006	"Ain't No Other Man"	Video of the Year	Nominated	
MTV Video Music Awards	2006	"Ain't No Other Man"	Best Pop Video	Nominated	
MTV Video Music Awards	2006	"Ain't No Other Man"	Best Female Video	Nominated	
MTV Video Music Awards	2006	"Ain't No Other Man"	Best Choreography in a Video	Nominated	
MTV Video Music Awards	2007	"Candyman"	Best Director (Note: With Matthew Rolston.)	Nominated	
MTV Video Music Awards	2013	"Feel This Moment" (with Pitbull)	Best Collaboration	Nominated	
MTV Video Music Awards	2024	Madonna, Britney Spears, Christina Aguilera & Missy Elliott performing a medley at the 2003 MTV VMA	Most Iconic Performance in VMA History	Nominated	
MTV Video Music Awards Japan	2002	"Lady Marmalade" (with Lil' Kim, Mýa & Pink)	Best Video From a Film	Won	
MTV Video Music Awards Japan	2005	"Car Wash" (featuring Missy Elliott)	Best Video From a Film	Nominated	
MTV Video Music Awards Japan	2007	"Ain't No Other Man"	Best Pop Video	Nominated	
MTV Video Music Awards Japan	2012	"Moves Like Jagger" (with Maroon 5)	Best Group Video	Nominated	
MTV Video Music Awards Japan	2012	"Moves Like Jagger" (with Maroon 5)	Best Collaboration Video	Nominated	
MTV Video Music Brazil	2003	"Dirrty" (featuring Redman)	Best International Video	Nominated	
MTV Video Music Brazil	2004	"The Voice Within"	Best International Video	Nominated	
MTV Video Play Awards	2007	"Candyman"	Popular Video	Won	
MTV Video Play Awards	2011	"Moves Like Jagger" (with Maroon 5)	Popular Video	Won	
MTV Wraps Up! 2003	2003	Madonna, Britney Spears, Christina Aguilera & Missy Elliott performing a medley at the 2003 MTV VMA	Live Performance of the Year	Won	
MuchMusic Awards	2001	Christina Aguilera	First Lady of Music	Nominated	
MuchMusic Video Awards	2000	"Genie in a Bottle"	People's Choice: Favourite International Artist	Nominated	
MuchMusic Video Awards	2003	"Dirrty" (featuring Redman)	People's Choice: Favourite International Artist	Nominated	
MuchMusic Video Awards	2003	"Beautiful"	Best International Artist Video	Nominated	
MuchMusic Video Awards	2004	"The Voice Within"	Best International Artist Video	Nominated	
MuchMusic Video Awards	2007	"Candyman"	Best International Artist Video	Nominated	
MuchMusic Video Awards	2011	"Not Myself Tonight"	Most Watched Video of the Year	Nominated	
Muhammad Ali Humanitarian Awards	2013	Christina Aguilera	Humanitarian of the Year	Won	
MVPA Awards	2001	"Come On Over Baby (All I Want Is You)"	Best Choreography	Nominated	
MVPA Awards	2002	"What's Going On" (with Artists Against AIDS)	Video of the Year – R&B	Won	
MVPA Awards	2002	"Lady Marmalade" (with Lil' Kim, Mýa & Pink)	Best Styling	Won	
MVPA Awards	2003	"Dirrty" (featuring Redman)	Best Styling	Won	
MVPA Awards	2003	"Dirrty" (featuring Redman)	Video of the Year – Pop	Nominated	
MVPA Awards	2003	"Dirrty" (featuring Redman)	Best Art Direction	Nominated	
MVPA Awards	2003	"Dirrty" (featuring Redman)	Best Choreography	Nominated	
MVPA Awards	2004	"Fighter"	Best Cinematography	Won	
MVPA Awards	2004	"Fighter"	Video of the Year – Pop	Won	
MVPA Awards	2004	"Fighter"	Best Direction of a Female Video	Nominated	
MVPA Awards	2004	"Fighter"	Video of the Year	Nominated	
MVPA Awards	2007	"Hurt"	Video of the Year	Won	
MVPA Awards	2007	"Hurt"	Best Adult Contemporary Video	Nominated	
MVPA Awards	2007	"Hurt"	Best Art Direction	Nominated	
MVPA Awards	2007	"Hurt"	Best Direction of a Female Artist	Nominated	
MVPA Awards	2007	"Ain't No Other Man"	Best Choreography	Nominated	
MVPA Awards	2007	"Ain't No Other Man"	Best Pop Music Video	Nominated	
MVPA Awards	2008	"Candyman"	Best Direction in a Pop Video	Won	
MVPA Awards	2008	"Candyman"	Best Choreography	Nominated	
MVPA Awards	2008	"Candyman"	Best Art Direction	Nominated	
MVPA Awards	2008	"Candyman"	Best Direction of a Female Artist	Nominated	
My VH1 Music Awards	2000	Christina Aguilera	Must-Have Album	Nominated	
My VH1 Music Awards	2000	Christina Aguilera	Welcome to the Big Time!	Nominated	
My VH1 Music Awards	2000	Christina Aguilera	Woman of the Year	Nominated	
My VH1 Music Awards	2000	Christina Aguilera	Booty Shake	Nominated	
My VH1 Music Awards	2001	"Lady Marmalade" (with Lil' Kim, Mýa and Pink)	My Favorite Video	Won	
My VH1 Music Awards	2001	"Lady Marmalade" (with Lil' Kim, Mýa and Pink)	Is It Hot in Here or Is It Just My Video?	Won	
My VH1 Music Awards	2001	"Lady Marmalade" (with Lil' Kim, Mýa and Pink)	There's No "I" in Team	Nominated	
My VH1 Music Awards	2001	"What's Going On" (with Artists Against AIDS)	There's No "I" in Team	Won	
MYX Music Awards	2012	"Moves Like Jagger" (with Maroon 5)	Favorite International Video	Nominated	
Nickelodeon Kids' Choice Awards	2001	Christina Aguilera	Favorite Female Singer	Nominated	
Nickelodeon Kids' Choice Awards	2007	Christina Aguilera	Favorite Female Singer	Nominated	
NME Awards	2003	Christina Aguilera	Worst Style	Won	
NME Awards	2003	Christina Aguilera	Sexiest Woman	Nominated	
Now! Awards	2018	"Moves Like Jagger" (with Maroon 5)	Song of the Teens	Nominated	
NRJ Music Awards	2007	Christina Aguilera	International Female Artist of the Year	Won	
NRJ Music Awards	2007	Back to Basics	International Album of the Year	Won	
NRJ Music Awards	2007	"Ain't No Other Man"	International Song of the Year	Nominated	
NRJ Music Awards	2009	Christina Aguilera	International Female Artist of the Year	Nominated	
NRJ Radio Awards	2001	"Lady Marmalade" (with Lil' Kim, Mýa and Pink)	Best International Song	Nominated	
NRJ Radio Awards	2001	"Lady Marmalade" (with Lil' Kim, Mýa and Pink)	Best Song from Soundtrack	Nominated	
NRJ Radio Awards	2004	Christina Aguilera	Best International Female	Nominated	
NRJ Radio Awards	2004	Christina Aguilera	Best Pop Artist	Won	
NRJ Radio Awards	2007	Christina Aguilera	Foreign Artist of the Year	Nominated	
Online Film & Television Association Awards	2001	"Lady Marmalade" (with Lil' Kim, Mýa & Pink)	Best Adapted Song	Nominated	
Online Film & Television Association Awards	2011	The Voice	Best Host or Panelist in a Non-Fiction Program	Won	
Online Film & Television Association Awards	2021	"Reflection"	Best Adapted Song	Nominated	
Palm Springs International Film Festival Awards	2011	Best Music	Burlesque (with Cher)	Won	
People Awards	2021	Christina Aguilera	Best Dressed Star	Won	
People's Choice Awards	2004	"Car Wash" (featuring Missy Elliott)	Favorite Remake	Nominated	
People's Choice Awards	2004	"Car Wash" (featuring Missy Elliott)	Favorite Combined Forces	Nominated	
People's Choice Awards	2007	"Ain't No Other Man"	Favorite R&B Song	Nominated	
People's Choice Awards	2012	"Moves Like Jagger" (with Maroon 5)	Favorite Song of the Year	Nominated	
People's Choice Awards	2013	The Voice	Favorite Celebrity Judge	Nominated	
People's Choice Awards	2013	Christina Aguilera	People's Voice †	Won	
People's Choice Awards	2020	"Loyal Brave True"	Soundtrack Song of the Year	Nominated	
People's Choice Awards	2021	Christina Aguilera	Music Icon Award †	Won	
Pollstar Awards	2003	Justified and Stripped Tour (with Justin Timberlake)	Most Creative Tour Package	Nominated	
Pollstar Awards	2003	Justified and Stripped Tour (with Justin Timberlake)	Most Creative Stage Production	Nominated	
PopCrush Awards	2011	"Moves Like Jagger" (with Maroon 5)	Song of the Year	Nominated	
PopCrush Awards	2012	"Your Body"	Video of the Year	Nominated	
PopCrush Awards	2012	Red Sin	Best Perfume	Nominated	
PopCrush Awards	2014	"Say Something" (with A Great Big World)	Song of the Year	Nominated	
PopCrush Awards	2014	Christina Aguilera	Best Dressed	Nominated	
PopCrush Awards	2014	Christina Aguilera	Best Magazine Cover (Note: Cover of October 2013 Maxim's issue.)	Nominated	
Premios Amigo	2000	Christina Aguilera	Best International Newcomer	Won	
Premios Amigo	2000	Christina Aguilera	Best Latin Newcomer	Nominated	
Premios Amigo	2000	Christina Aguilera	Female Artist	Nominated	
Premios Gardel	2001	Christina Aguilera	Best Female Latino Singer	Nominated	
Premios Juventud	2004	Christina Aguilera and Ricky Martin	Best Dinamic Duet	Nominated	
Premios Juventud	2013	"Feel This Moment" (with Pitbull)	Favorite Hit	Nominated	
Premios Juventud	2014	"Hoy Tengo Ganas de Ti" (with Alejandro Fernandez)	Best Novel Theme	Nominated	
Premios Juventud	2022	"Pa Mis Muchachas" (with Becky G, Nicki Nicole and Nathy Peluso)	Best Female Collaboration	Nominated	
Premios Juventud	2022	"Santo" (with Ozuna)	Best Anglo Collaboration	Nominated	
Premios Juventud	2023	"No Es Que Te Extrañe"	Most Video With The Most Powerful Message	Nominated	
Premios Lo Nuestro	2001	Mi Reflejo	Pop Album of the Year	Nominated	
Premios Lo Nuestro	2001	Christina Aguilera	Pop New Artist of the Year	Won	
Premios Lo Nuestro	2001	Christina Aguilera	Pop Female Artist of the Year	Won	
Premios Lo Nuestro	2002	Christina Aguilera	Pop Female Artist of the Year	Nominated	
Premios Lo Nuestro	2014	"Hoy Tengo Ganas de Ti" (with Alejandro Fernández)	Video of the Year	Nominated	
Premios Mixup	2001	Christina Aguilera	Spanish-language Female Artist	Nominated	
Premios Oye!	2007	Back to Basics	Album of the Year – English	Nominated	
Premios Oye!	2007	"Ain't No Other Man"	Song of the Year – English	Nominated	
Premios People en Español	2013	Christina Aguilera	Singer of the Year	Nominated	
Premios People en Español	2013	"Feel This Moment" (with Pitbull)	Collaboration of the Year	Nominated	
Premios People en Español	2013	"Hoy Tengo Ganas de Ti" (with Alejandro Fernández)	Collaboration of the Year	Nominated	
Premios TVyNovelas	2014	"Hoy Tengo Ganas de Ti" (with Alejandro Fernández)	Best Musical Theme	Nominated	
Premios Shangay	2003	Christina Aguilera	Best International Artist	Nominated	
Q Awards	2003	"Dirrty" (featuring Redman)	Best Track	Won	
Q Awards	2003	"Dirrty" (featuring Redman)	Best Video	Nominated	
Radio Music Awards	1999	Christina Aguilera	Most Stylin' at the Show – Female	Won	
Radio Music Awards	2001	"Lady Marmalade" (with Lil' Kim, Mýa & Pink)	Song of the Year – Top 40	Won	
Radio Music Awards	2003	"Beautiful"	Song of the Year – Top 40	Nominated	
Radio Music Awards	2003	"Beautiful"	Best Hook Up Song	Nominated	
Radio Music Awards	2003	Christina Aguilera	Artist of the Year – Top 40	Nominated	
Radio Music Awards	2003	Christina Aguilera	Most Requested Artist of the Year	Nominated	
Ritmo Latino Awards (Note: Also known as "Premio de la Gente" or Latin Music Fan Awards.)	2001	Christina Aguilera	Female Pop Artist or Group	Nominated	
Ritmo Latino Awards	2001	"Nobody Wants to Be Lonely" (with Ricky Martin)	Music Video of the Year	Nominated	
The Record of the Year	2001	"Lady Marmalade" (with Lil' Kim, Mýa and Pink)	Record of the Year	Nominated	
Rennbahn Express Awards	1999	Christina Aguilera	Singer of the Year	3rd place	
Rennbahn Express Awards	1999	Christina Aguilera	Newcomer of the Year	2nd place	
Rennbahn Express Awards	1999	"Genie in a Bottle"	Song of the Year	8th place	
Rockbjörnen	2006	Christina Aguilera	Foreign Artist of the Year	Nominated	
Rockbjörnen	2006	"Hurt"	Best Foreign Song	Nominated	
Rockbjörnen	2006	Back to Basics	Best Foreign Album	Nominated	
Rolling Stone Music Awards	2004	Justified and Stripped Tour (with Justin Timberlake)	Best Tour – Public's Choice	Won	
Rolling Stone Music Awards	2004	Christina Aguilera	Best Female Performer – Public's Choice	Won	
Rolling Stone Music Awards	2006	Christina Aguilera	Best Female Performer – Public's Choice	Won	
Rolling Stone Music Awards	2006	Christina Aguilera	Best R&B Artist	Won	
RTHK International Pop Awards	2002	"Nobody Wants to Be Lonely" (with Ricky Martin)	Top Duet	Silver	
RTHK International Pop Awards	2003	"Beautiful"	International Song	Gold	
RTHK International Pop Awards	2005	"Car Wash" (featuring Missy Elliott)	Top Movie/TV Song	Gold	
RTHK International Pop Awards	2007	"Ain't No Other Man"	International Song	Gold	
RTHK International Pop Awards	2007	Christina Aguilera	Top Female Artist	Nominated	
RTHK International Pop Awards	2008	Christina Aguilera	Top Female Artist	Silver	
RTHK International Pop Awards	2008	"Candyman"	International Song	Gold	
RTHK International Pop Awards	2012	"Moves Like Jagger" (with Maroon 5)	International Song	Gold	
The Shade Tree Awards	2019	Christina Aguilera	Community Hero Award †	Won	
Shorty Awards	2012	Christina Aguilera	Singer	Nominated	
Shorty Awards	2012	Christina Aguilera	Hero	Nominated	
Shorty Awards	2012	Christina Aguilera	Celebrity	Nominated	
Shorty Awards	2012	Christina Aguilera	Actress	Nominated	
Shorty Awards	2012	Christina Aguilera	Music	Nominated	
Shorty Awards	2013	Christina Aguilera	Music	Nominated	
Shorty Awards	2013	Christina Aguilera	Singer	Nominated	
Shorty Awards	2013	Christina Aguilera	Ativist	Nominated	
Shorty Awards	2013	Christina Aguilera	Celebrity	Nominated	
Shorty Awards	2013	Christina Aguilera	Nowplaying	Nominated	
Sixy Awards	2002	Christina Aguilera	Over-Sixed	Won	
Smash Hits Poll Winners Party	2000	Christina Aguilera	Best Female Singer	8th place	
Smash Hits Poll Winners Party	2000	Christina Aguilera	Best Dressed Female	5th place	
Smash Hits Poll Winners Party	2000	Christina Aguilera	Most Fanciable Female on the Planet	3rd place	
Smash Hits Poll Winners Party	2000	Christina Aguilera	Worst Female Singer	Won	
Smash Hits Poll Winners Party	2000	Christina Aguilera	Worst Dressed Person	3rd place	
Smash Hits Poll Winners Party	2002	Christina Aguilera	Worst Dressed Person	Won	
Smash Hits Poll Winners Party	2002	Christina Aguilera	Worst Hair	Won	
Smash Hits Poll Winners Party	2002	Christina Aguilera	Flop Mob Award	Won	
Smash Hits Poll Winners Party	2003	Christina Aguilera	Best Female Solo Artist	Won	
Smash Hits Poll Winners Party	2003	Christina Aguilera	Pop Snog of the Year (Note: Shared with Madonna and Britney Spears.)	Won	
Smash Hits Poll Winners Party	2004	Christina Aguilera	Top Pop Mod	2nd place	
Smash Hits Poll Winners Party	2004	Christina Aguilera	Worst Dressed Star	3rd place	
SOCAN Awards	2014	"Feel This Moment" (with Pitbull)	Dance Music Award	Won	
Spetteguless Awards	2010	Christina Aguilera	Singer of the Year	3nd place	
Spetteguless Awards	2010	Christina Aguilera	Best Female Pop Singer of the 2000s	Nominated	
Spetteguless Awards	2010	"Not Myself Tonight"	Best Pop Song	Nominated	
Spetteguless Awards	2012	"Moves Like Jagger" (with Maroon 5)	Song of the Year	Nominated	
Spetteguless Awards	2013	Lotus	Album of the Year	Nominated	
Spetteguless Awards	2013	"Your Body"	Best Pop Song	Nominated	
Spetteguless Awards	2013	"Your Body"	Video of the Year	3nd place	
Spike TV Video Game Awards	2003	The Sims: Superstar	Best Performance by a Human	Nominated	
Spin Awards	2003	"Dirrty" (featuring Redman)	Worst Song	2nd place	
Spin Awards	2003	Christina Aguilera	Worst Dressed Artist	Won	
Spin Awards	2004	Christina Aguilera	Worst Dressed Artist	Won	
Spin Awards	2005	Christina Aguilera	Worst Dressed Artist	Won	
SSE Live Awards	2020	The X Tour	Best Solo Act	Won	
St. Louis Film Critics Association Awards	2010	Burlesque (with Cher)	Best Music	Nominated	
Stonewall National Monument Award	2023	Christina Aguilera	Special Recognition Award †	Won (Note: Aguilera was honored at the Stonewall National Monument for her LGBTQ allyship and for advocating for the queer community.)	
Sugar Magazine Awards	2007	Christina Aguilera	The Most Inspiring Star of the Year	2nd place	
TEC Awards	2002	"Lady Marmalade" (with Lil' Kim, Mýa & Pink)	Record Production – Single or Track	Nominated	
Teen Choice Awards	1999	Christina Aguilera	Choice: Female Artist	Nominated	
Teen Choice Awards	1999	"Genie in a Bottle"	Choice Music Single	Nominated	
Teen Choice Awards	1999	"Genie in a Bottle"	Choice Music Video	Nominated	
Teen Choice Awards	1999	"Genie in a Bottle"	Choice Summer Song	Nominated	
Teen Choice Awards	2000	Christina Aguilera	Choice: Female Hottie	Nominated	
Teen Choice Awards	2000	Christina Aguilera	Choice Music: Female Artist	Nominated	
Teen Choice Awards	2000	Christina Aguilera	Choice Music: Album	Nominated	
Teen Choice Awards	2000	"I Turn to You"	Choice Music: Love Song	Nominated	
Teen Choice Awards	2000	"What a Girl Wants"	Choice Music: Single	Nominated	
Teen Choice Awards	2001	"Lady Marmalade" (with Lil' Kim, Mýa & Pink)	Choice Music: Summer Song	Won	
Teen Choice Awards	2001	Christina Aguilera	Choice Summer Music Star: Female	Won	
Teen Choice Awards	2001	Christina Aguilera	Choice Music: Female Artist	Nominated	
Teen Choice Awards	2003	Christina Aguilera	Choice Music: Female Artist	Nominated	
Teen Choice Awards	2003	Stripped	Choice Music: Album	Nominated	
Teen Choice Awards	2003	"Beautiful"	Choice Music: Single	Nominated	
Teen Choice Awards	2003	"Dirrty" (featuring Redman)	Choice Music: Hook-Up	Nominated	
Teen Choice Awards	2003	Justified and Stripped Tour (with Justin Timberlake)	Choice Music: Tour of the Summer	Won	
Teen Choice Awards	2006	"Ain't No Other Man"	Choice Music: R&B/Hip Hop Song	Nominated	
Teen Choice Awards	2011	The Voice	Choice TV: Female Personality	Nominated	
Teen Choice Awards	2012	The Voice	Choice TV: Female Personality	Nominated	
Teen Choice Awards	2012	"Moves Like Jagger" (with Maroon 5)	Choice Music: Singe by a Group	Nominated	
Teen Choice Awards	2013	"Feel This Moment" (with Pitbull)	Choice Music: Single by a Male Artist	Nominated	
Teen Entertainment Awards	1999	"Genie in a Bottle"	Best Song – Female Artist	Won	
Teen Entertainment Awards	1999	Christina Aguilera	Best CD	Won	
Teen Entertainment Awards	1999	Christina Aguilera	Best Female Artist	Won	
Teen Entertainment Awards	2000	Christina Aguilera	Best Female Artist	Won	
Teen Entertainment Awards	2000	Christina Aguilera	Most Stylish Female Artist	Won	
Teen Entertainment Awards	2000	Christina Aguilera	Best Untrue Gossip	Nominated	
Teen Entertainment Awards	2000	"What a Girl Wants"	Best Girl Power Song	Won	
Teen Entertainment Awards	2000	"What a Girl Wants"	Best Song to Listen To While Kissing Your Boyfriend	Nominated	
Teen People Choice Awards	2001	Christina Aguilera	Hottest Star Under 25	Won	
Teen People Choice Awards	2001	"Lady Marmalade" (with Lil' Kim, Mýa and Pink)	Hottest Song of the Year	Nominated	
Teen People Choice Awards	2003	Christina Aguilera	Best Image 180º	Won	
Teen People Choice Awards	2003	Justified and Stripped Tour (with Justin Timberlake)	Best Tour	Won	
Teen People Choice Awards	2003	"Beautiful"	Best Song Lyrics	Nominated	
Teen People Choice Awards	2003	"Dirrty" (featuring Redman)	Best Booty-Shakin' Song	Won	
Teen People Choice Awards	2003	"Can't Hold Us Down" (featuring Lil' Kim)	Most Empowering Anthem	Won	
TMF Awards (Belgium)	2001	"Lady Marmalade" (with Lil' Kim, Mýa & Pink)	International Video of the Year	Won	
TMF Awards (Belgium)	2003	"Fighter"	International Video of the Year	Won	
TMF Awards (Belgium)	2003	Stripped	Best International Album	Won	
TMF Awards (Belgium)	2003	Christina Aguilera	Best International Female Artist	Won	
TMF Awards (Netherlands)	2000	Christina Aguilera	Most Promising Act	Won	
TMF Awards (Netherlands)	2002	"Lady Marmalade" (with Lil' Kim, Mýa & Pink)	International Video of the Year	Won	
TMF Awards (Netherlands)	2003	Christina Aguilera	Best International Female Artist	Won	
TMF Awards (Netherlands)	2004	Christina Aguilera	Best International Female Artist	Won	
Top 50 Music Awards	2022	Christina Aguilera	Best Act or Group	Nominated	
Top 50 Music Awards	2022	Aguilera	Album of the Year	Nominated	
Top 50 Music Awards	2022	"Pa Mis Muchachas" (with Becky G, Nicki Nicole and Nathy Peluso)	Best Collaboration	Nominated	
Top Music Universe Awards	2022	"Pa Mis Muchachas" (with Becky G, Nicki Nicole and Nathy Peluso)	Latin Collaboration of the Year	Nominated	
TRL Awards	2003	Christina Aguilera	Evolution Award	Won	
TRL Awards	2003	Christina Aguilera	First Lady Award	Nominated	
TRL Awards	2003	"Genie in a Bottle"	TRL's Top 10 Music Videos	2nd place	
TRL Awards	2004	Christina Aguilera	First Lady Award	Nominated	
Top of the Pops	2003	Christina Aguilera	Singer of the Year	Won	
Top of the Pops	2003	Christina Aguilera	Most Gorge Girl	3rd place	
Top of the Pops	2003	Christina Aguilera	Most Crap Hair	3rd place	
Top of the Pops	2003	Christina Aguilera	Most Dodgy Clobber	Won	
Top of the Pops	2003	Christina Aguilera	Shameless Exhibitionist	2nd place	
Top of the Pops	2003	"Fighter"	Video of the Year	Nominated	
Top of the Pops	2005	Christina Aguilera	Dressed in the Dark	Nominated	
VH1 Awards	2000	Christina Aguilera	Sexiest Teen Idol	Won	
VH1 Awards	2003	"Beautiful"	Big Song	Nominated	
Viña del Mar Awards	2023	Christina Aguilera	—N/a (Note: During the festival Aguilera was the recipient of two awards: Gaviota de Plata and Gaviota de Oro.)	Won	
Virgin Media Music Awards	2006	"Ain't No Other Man"	Best Single	2nd place	
Virgin Media Music Awards	2006	Christina Aguilera	Best Solo Artist	2nd place	
Virgin Media Music Awards	2006	Christina Aguilera	Best Comeback	2nd place	
Virgin Media Music Awards	2007	Christina Aguilera	Most Fanciable Female	Nominated	
Virgin Media Music Awards	2008	Christina Aguilera	Best International Act	Nominated	
Virgin Media Music Awards	2010	Christina Aguilera	Best Solo Female	Nominated	
Virgin Media Music Awards	2011	Christina Aguilera	Best Comeback	Won	
Virgin Media Music Awards	2012	"Moves Like Jagger" (with Maroon 5)	Best Track	Nominated	
Virgin Media Music Awards	2012	"Moves Like Jagger" (with Maroon 5)	Best Collaboration	Won	
Virgin Media Music Awards	2012	"Moves Like Jagger" (with Maroon 5)	Best Video	Nominated	
Virgin Radio UK Awards	2021	"Beautiful"	The Ultimate Pride Anthem	Nominated	
VIVA Comet Awards	2003	Christina Aguilera	Act International	Nominated	
Webby Awards	2023	"Beautiful"	Best Music Video (General)	Won	
Webby Awards	2023	"Beautiful"	Best Music Video (People's Voice Winner)	Won	
Webby Awards	2025	The 25th Anniversary of Christina Aguilera (Spotify Anniversaries Live)	Music – General Video & Film	Nominated	
Webby Awards	2025	"What a Girl Wants" (with Sabrina Carpenter)	Best Individual Performance – Performance & Craft	Nominated	
Wembley Arena	2003	Christina Aguilera	Wembley Female Artist of the Year	Won	
World Music Awards	2000	Christina Aguilera	Best-Selling New Female Artist	Won	
World Music Awards	2001	Christina Aguilera	Best-Selling Female Latin Artist	Won	
World Music Awards	2014	Christina Aguilera	Best Live Act	Nominated	
World Music Awards	2014	Christina Aguilera	Best Female Artist	Nominated	
World Music Awards	2014	Christina Aguilera	Best Entertainer	Nominated	
World Music Awards	2014	"Feel This Moment" (with Pitbull)	Best Song	Nominated	
World Music Awards	2014	"Feel This Moment" (with Pitbull)	Best Video	Nominated	
World Music Awards	2014	"Say Something" (with A Great Big World)	Best Video	Nominated	
World Music Awards	2014	"Say Something" (with A Great Big World)	Best Song	Nominated	
World Music Awards	2014	"Hoy Tengo Ganas de Ti" (with Alejandro Fernández)	Best Song	Nominated	
World Music Awards	2014	"Your Body"	Best Song	Nominated	
World Music Awards	2014	"Your Body"	Best Video	Nominated	
World Music Awards	2014	Lotus	Best Album	Nominated	
You Choice Awards	2010	"Not Myself Tonight"	Video of the Year	Won	
You Choice Awards	2010	"You Lost Me"	Best Ballad/Love Song	Won	
You Choice Awards	2010	"You Lost Me"	Best Pop Video	Nominated	
YoungStar Awards	1999	Christina Aguilera and "Genie in a Bottle"	Best Young Recording Artist or Musical Group	Nominated	
YoungStar Awards	2000	Christina Aguilera	YoungStar Starlight Award	Won	
Z Awards	2010	Christina Aguilera and Jordan Bratman	Biggest Celeb Breakup	2nd place	
Z Awards	2011	"Moves Like Jagger" (with Maroon 5)	Collaboration of the Year	2nd place	
ZAZ Awards (South Africa)	2001	"Lady Marmalade" (with Lil' Kim, Mýa & Pink)	International Song of the Year	Nominated	

== Other accolades & listicles ==
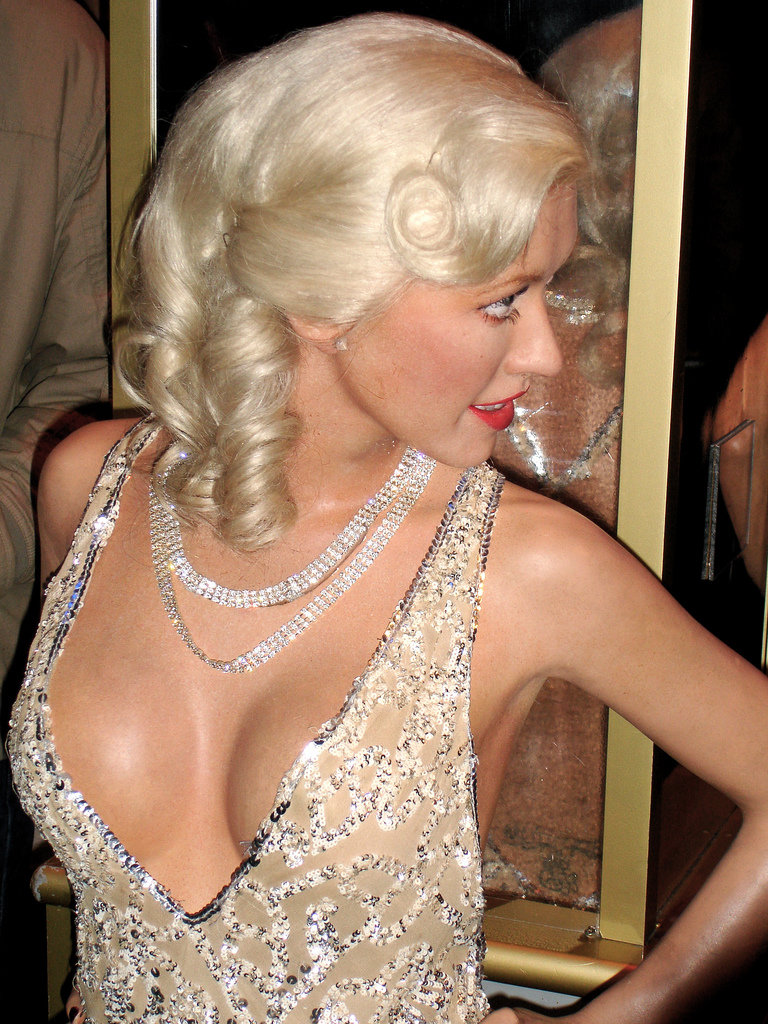
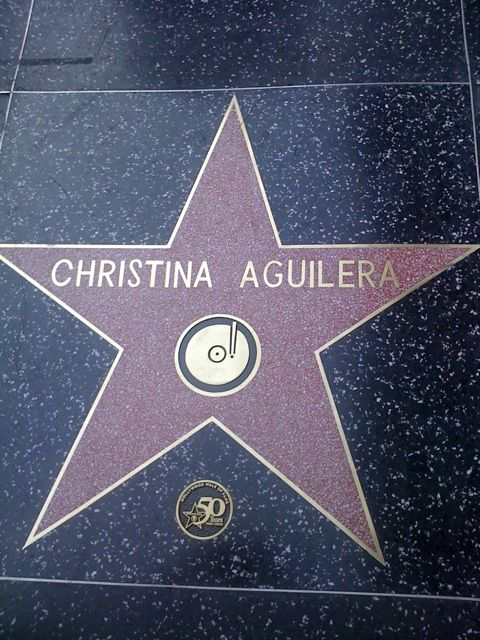
Aguilera's wax figure at the Madame Tussauds in London (left), her star on the Hollywood Walk of Fame (middle) and her Disney Legends plaque (right).

=== Other honors ===
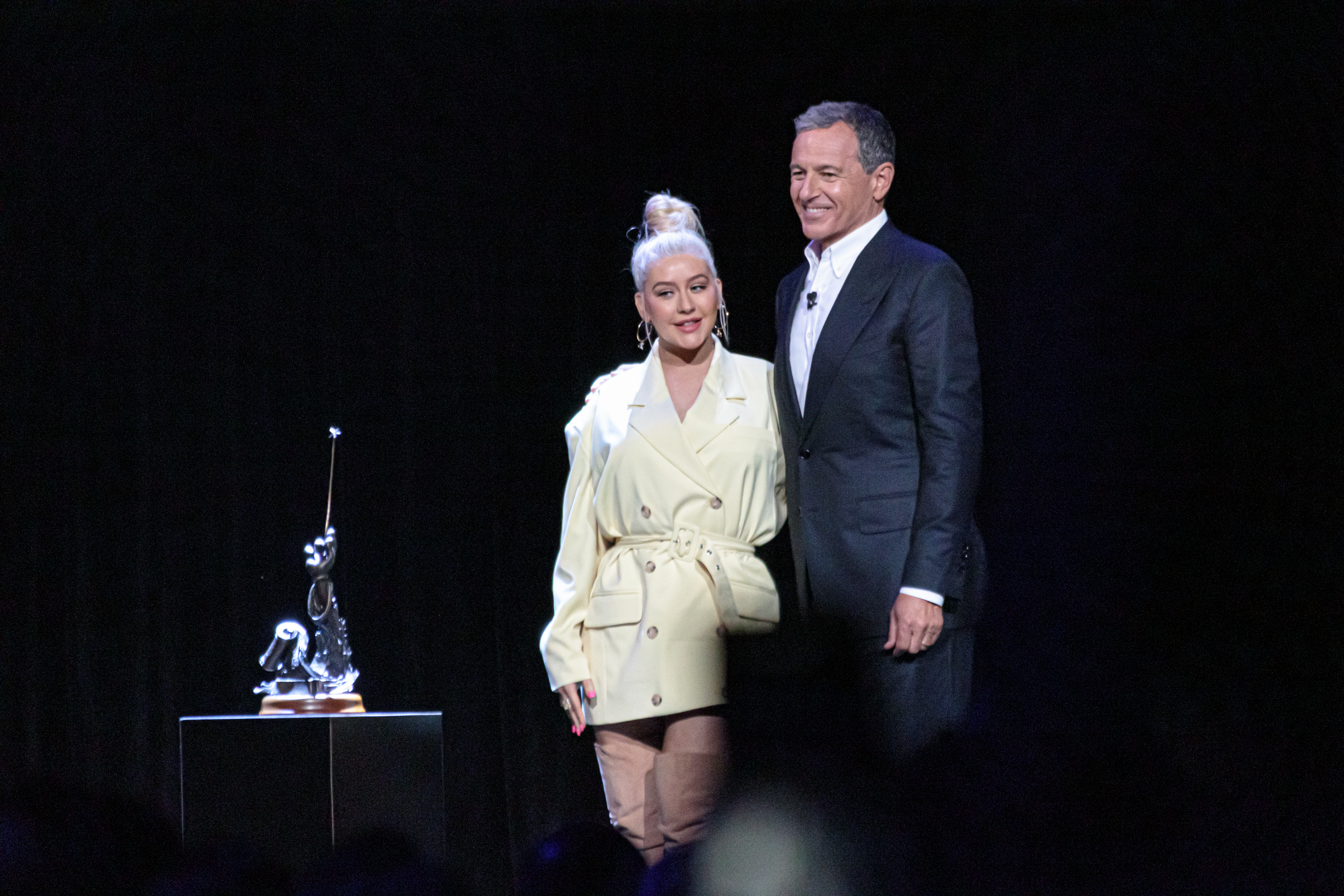
Aguilera honored at the 2019 Disney Legends Awards

Other honors for Aguilera
Country	Year	Description	Ref.
United States	2000	Inducted into the Young Hollywood Hall of Fame.	
United States	2010	Immortalized on the Hollywood Walk of Fame.	
United States	2011	Immortalized on the Gay Walk of Fame by The Abbey Club.	
United States	2019	Honored as a Disney Legend by Walt Disney Company.	

=== Other tributes ===
Other tributes to Aguilera
Country	Year	Category	Ref.
United Kingdom	2006	Madame Tussauds (wax figures)	
United States	2007	Madame Tussauds (wax figures)	
Netherlands	2007	Madame Tussauds (wax figures)	

=== World derecords ===
Name of publication, year the record was awarded, name of the record, and the name of the record holder
Publication	Year	World record	Record holder	Ref.
Guinness World Records	2005	Largest TV Audience for a Performance (340 Million Viewers)	Madonna; Britney Spears; Christina Aguilera; Missy Elliott	

=== Listicles ===
Name of publisher, name of listicle, year(s) listed, and placement result
Publisher	Year	Listicle	For	Result	Ref.
Amazon Music	2010	Top Songs of 2010	"Elastic Love" (from Bionic)	12th	
Billboard	2009	Artists of the Decade (2000s)	Herself	20th	
Billboard	2017	The 100 Best Deep Cuts by 21st Century Pop Stars: Critics’ Picks	"Birds of Prey" (from Bionic)	68th	
Billboard	2017	The 100 Best Deep Cuts by 21st Century Pop Stars: Critics’ Picks	"Red Hot Kinda Love" (from Lotus)	42nd	
Billboard	2018	100 Best Acting Performances by Musicians in Movies (for her performance)	Burlesque	78th	
Billboard	2025	Top 100 Female Artists of the 21st Century	Herself	20th	
Business Insider	2014	23 Highest-Paid Reality TV Stars	Herself	5th	
Cleveland.com	2000	Biggest Pop Star in the World	Herself	1st	
Cleveland.com	2003	Biggest Pop Star in the World	Herself	2nd	
Consequence of Sound	2016	100 Greatest Singers of All Time	Herself	54th	
Digital Dream Door	1999	100 Greatest Albums from 1999	Christina Aguilera	36th	
Digital Dream Door	2006	100 Greatest Songs from 2006	"Ain't No Other Man"	17th	
Digital Dream Door	2010	100 Greatest Songs from 2010	"Not Myself Tonight"	40th	
Forbes	2007	20 Richest Women in Entertainment	Herself	19th	
Forbes	2008	Top-Earning Women in Music	Herself	7th	
Forbes	2023	15 Iconic Christmas Pop Songs	"Christmas Time"	5th	
Forbes	2025	Top Female Vocalists of the 1990s	Herself	28th	
Google	2002	Most Popular Women on the Web	Herself	8th	
Google	2004	Most Popular Searches on the Web	Herself	3rd	
Google	2010	50 Most Popular Women on the Web	Herself	25th	
Google	2023	Most Popular Person on the Web (Chile)	Herself	1st	
HuffPost	2024	24 Best Albums of 2024	The 25th Anniversary of Christina Aguilera (Spotify Anniversaries Live)	Placed	
Irish America Magazine	2001	Top 100 Irish Americans	Herself	Placed	
Latina	2013	50 Best Latin Singers of All Time	Herself	1st	
MTV	2003	22 Greatest Voices in Music	Herself	Placed	
NME	2011	20 Best Pop Acts of All Time	Herself	4th	
People en Español	2022	25 Most Powerful Women of 2022	Herself	Placed	
Playboy	2014	The 40 Sexiest Music Videos of All Time	"Dirrty"	8th	
Rock and Roll Hall of Fame	2007	Definitive 200 Albums	Christina Aguilera	127th	
Rolling Stone	2006	The 100 Best Songs of the Year	"Ain't No Other Man"	18th	
Rolling Stone	2010	100 Greatest Singers of All Time	Herself	58th	
Smooth Radio	2021	30 Greatest Female Singers of All Time	Herself	11th	
Smooth Radio	2021	100 Greatest Artists of All Time	Herself	88th	
Stylist	2011	50 Female Pop Pioneers	Herself	Placed	
The Fader	2017	150 More Great Albums Made By Women	Stripped	23rd	
The Guardian	2013	100 Most Popular Musicians on Twitter	Herself	70th	
The Independent	2004	100 Most Influential People in Music	Herself	59th	
The Village Voice	2006	The Best Singles of 2006	"Ain't No Other Man"	3rd	
Time	2013	100 Most Influential People in the World (under "Artists" with tribute written by Céline Dion)	Herself	Placed	
Univision	2013	Most Influential Hispanics in the United States	Herself	Placed	
USA Today	2020	Women of the Century – Pennsylvania	Herself	Placed	
VH1	2003	50 Greatest Women of the Video Era	Herself	14th	
VH1	2003	50 Greatest Teen Idols	Herself	23rd	
VH1	2012	100 Greatest Women in Music	Herself	8th	
Variety	2024	Latin Grammys at 25: The 10 Biggest Moments	Aguilera's performance at the 1st Annual Latin Grammy Awards	1st	
Yahoo!	2003	Most Popular Searches on the Web	Herself	10th	
Yahoo!	2003	Most Popular Celebrity Image Searches	Herself	3rd	
Yahoo!	2013	250 Best Female Singers of the 20th Century	Herself	4th	

Billboard Magazine Year-End listicles: (Billboard Year-End charts are cumulative rankings of entries in Billboard magazine charts in the United States in any given chart year.
Year	Listicle	For	Result	Ref.
1999	Top New Artist	Christina Aguilera	3rd	
1999	Hot 100 Singles Sales	Genie In A Bottle	5th	
1999	Mainstream Top 40	Genie In A Bottle	5th	
1999	Rhythmic Top 40	Genie In A Bottle	5th	
1999	Hot Top 40 Tracks	Genie In A Bottle	7th	
1999	Hot 100 Singles	Genie In A Bottle	7th	
1999	Top Billboard 200 Albums Artists — Female	Christina Aguilera	11th	
1999	Hot 100 Singles Airplay	Genie In A Bottle	14th	
1999	Hot 100 Singles Artists	Christina Aguilera	21st	
1999	Top Artists	Christina Aguilera	22nd	
1999	Top Billboard 200 Album Artists	Christina Aguilera	39th	
1999	Top Billboard 200 Albums	Christina Aguilera	39th	
1999	Adult Top 40	Genie In A Bottle	86th	
2000	Top Artists — Female	Christina Aguilera	1st	
2000	Latin Pop Albums	Mi Reflejo	1st	
2000	Hot 100 Singles Artists — Female	Christina Aguilera	2nd	
2000	Top Holiday Albums	My Kind Of Christmas	2nd	
2000	Top Billboard 200 Artists — Female	Christina Aguilera	3rd	
2000	Hot 100 Artists	Christina Aguilera	3rd	
2000	Hot Top 40 Artists	Christina Aguilera	3rd	
2000	Top Artists	Christina Aguilera	4th	
2000	Top Latin Pop Album Artists	Christina Aguilera	4th	
2000	Top Latin Albums	Mi Reflejo	5th	
2000	Top Billboard 200 Albums	Christina Aguilera	8th	
2000	Hot Top 40 Tracks	What A Girl Wants	8th	
2000	Top Billboard 200 Artists	Christina Aguilera	9th	
2000	Top Billboard Latin 50 Artists	Christina Aguilera	10th	
2000	Hot 100 Singles Sales	What A Girl Wants	16th	
2000	Hot 100 Singles	What A Girl Wants	19th	
2000	Rhythmic Top 40	Come On Over (All I Want Is You)	32nd	
2000	Mainstream Top 40	Come On Over (All I Want Is You)	34th	
2000	Hot 100 Singles	Come On Over (All I Want Is You)	38th	
2000	Hot Latin Songs	Ven Conmigo (Solamente Tú)	40th	
2000	Hot 100 Singles	I Turn To You	42nd	
2000	Hot 100 Single Sales	I Turn To You	44th	
2000	Rhythmic Top 40	I Turn To You	45th	
2000	Mainstream Top 40	I Turn To You	50th	
2000	Adult Top 40	I Turn To You	86th	
2000	Top Billboard 200 Albums	My Kind Of Christmas	130th	
2001	Top Latin Album Artists — Female	Christina Aguilera	2nd	
2001	Top Latin Albums	Mi Reflejo	2nd	
2001	Latin Pop Albums	Mi Reflejo	2nd	
2001	Top Latin Pop Album Artists — Female	Christina Aguilera	2nd	
2001	Top Latin Pop Album Artists	Christina Aguilera	3rd	
2001	Top Latin Album Artists	Christina Aguilera	4th	
2001	Mainstream Top 40	Lady Marmalade	4th	
2001	Top Billboard 200 Artists — Female	Christina Aguilera	9th	
2001	Rhythmic Top 40	Lady Marmalde	16th	
2001	Adult Contemporary	Nobody Wants To Be Lonely	16th	
2001	Hot 100 Singles	Lady Marmalade	24th	
2001	Latin Pop Airplay	Pero Me Acuerdo de Ti	30th	
2001	Top Billboard 200 Artists	Christina Aguilera	36th	
2001	Hot 100 Singles	Nobody Wants To Be Lonely	55th	
2001	Hot 100 Artists	Christina Aguilera	63rd	
2001	Mainstream Top 40	Nobody Wants To Be Lonely	64th	
2001	Adult Top 40	Lady Marmalade	74th	
2001	Adult Top 40	Nobody Wants To Be Lonely	87th	
2001	Rhythmic	Nobody Wants To Be Lonely	94th	
2001	Top Billboard 200 Albums	Christina Aguilera	96th	
2002	Top Billboard 200 Albums — Female	Stripped	13th	
2002	Mainstream Top 40	Dirrty	83rd	
2002	Rhythmic	Dirrty	90th	
2002	Top Billboard 200 Albums	Stripped	122nd	
2003	Top Artists — Female	Christina Aguilera	1st	
2003	Hot 100 Artists — Female	Christina Aguilera	2nd	
2003	Top Billboard 200 Artists — Female	Christina Aguilera	4th	
2003	Mainstream Top 40	Beautiful	4th	
2003	Top Artists	Christina Aguilera	5th	
2003	Top Billboard Albums — Female	Stripped	5th	
2003	Adult Contemporary	Beautiful	5th	
2003	Hot 100 Artists	Christina Aguilera	7th	
2003	Top Billboard Albums	Stripped	10th	
2003	Top Billboard 200 Artists	Christina Aguilera	13th	
2003	Hot 100 Singles	Beautiful	16th	
2003	Mainstream Top 40	Can’t Hold Us Down	19th	
2003	Mainstream Top 40	Fighter	21st	
2003	Adult Top 40	Beautiful	30th	
2003	Rhythmic	Beautiful	49th	
2003	Rhythmic	Can’t Hold Us Down	62nd	
2003	Hot 100 Singles	Can’t Hold Us Down	67th	
2003	Hot 100 Singles	Fighter	79th	
2004	Adult Contemporary	The Voice Within	41st	
2004	Mainstream Top 40	The Voice Within	63rd	
2006	Dance Mix/Show Airplay	Ain’t No Other Man	4th	
2006	Pop 100 Artists — Female	Christina Aguilera	7th	
2006	Hot Dance Airplay Artists	Christina Aguilera	8th	
2006	Dance Club Songs	Ain’t No Other Man	8th	
2006	Hot 100 Artists — Female	Christina Aguilera	12th	
2006	Top Billboard 200 Albums — Female	Back To Basics	13th	
2006	Hot Videoclips	Ain’t No Other Man	13th	
2006	Pop 100	Ain’t No Other Man	19th	
2006	Pop 100 Artists	Christina Aguilera	21st	
2006	Pop 100 Airplay	Ain’t No Other Man	21st	
2006	Hot Digital Singles Artists	Christina Aguilera	24th	
2006	Hot Digital Songs	Ain’t No Other Man	24th	
2006	Hot 100 Singles	Ain’t No Other Man	32nd	
2006	Hot 100 Artists	Christina Aguilera	34th	
2006	Top Billboard 200 Albums	Back To Basics	59th	
2006	Top R&B/Hip-Hop Albums	Back To Basics	60th	
