= Keeps Gettin' Better: A Decade of Hits =

Greatest hits album by Christina Aguilera
- Released: November 6, 2008
- Recorded: 1998–2008
- Genre: Pop
- Length: 62:55
- Label: RCA
- Producers: Walter Afanasieff; Christina Aguilera; Glen Ballard; ChakDaddy; DJ Premier; E. Dawk; Missy Elliott; Ron Fair; Rob Lewis; Balewa Muhammad; Linda Perry; Charles Roane; Guy Roche; Rockwilder; Scott Storch; Sol Survivor

Christina Aguilera chronology
Back to Basics (2006)	Keeps Gettin' Better: A Decade of Hits (2008)	Bionic (2010)

Singles from Keeps Gettin' Better: A Decade of Hits
- 1. "Keeps Gettin' Better" Released: September 22, 2008

Keeps Gettin' Better: A Decade of Hits is the first greatest hits album by American singer-songwriter Christina Aguilera. It was released on November 6, 2008 by RCA Records. The album contains Aguilera's singles from all of her studio albums released up to 2008. It also featured four new additions: two remakes of her previous singles — "Genie in a Bottle" (1999) and "Beautiful" (2002) — and two original songs "Keeps Gettin' Better" and "Dynamite". In the United States, the album was released on November 11, 2008, exclusively via Target.

The compilation album received positive reviews from music critics, who praised her musical career over her first decade since entering the music industry. The album debuted at number nine on the US Billboard 200, and has sold over 614,000 copies in the United States as of 2018. Internationally, it entered the top ten of record charts in multiple countries, including Australia, Ireland, Japan, Austria and France, and achieved several certifications.

== Background ==
In September 2008, it was announced that Aguilera would release a greatest hits album titled Keeps Gettin' Better: A Decade of Hits, whose distribution rights in the United States belonged to Target via her record label RCA Records. On the compilation's title, Aguilera said: "I'm looking forward to the next 10 years, which is partly why I named the album, Keeps Gettin' Better, 'cause it does". People who pre-ordered the compilation would receive a free digital download version of the single "Keeps Gettin' Better". During an interview with the Los Angeles Times, Aguilera explained that Target "got such a great creative team", and that's why she worked with the retailer for the album.

== Content ==
Released in November 2008, Keeps Gettin' Better: A Decade of Hits opens with Aguilera's "early chart-toppers" and first four singles: "Genie In a Bottle", "What a Girl Wants", "I Turn to You" and the radio version of "Come On Over (All I Want Is You)", all from her self-titled debut album. The compilation continues with her 2001 collaborations "Lady Marmalade" and "Nobody Wants to Be Lonely"; the former with Pink, Lil' Kim, Mýa and the latter with Ricky Martin. The compilation also included Aguilera's "professional and sexual coming-of-age" songs from her 2002 studio album Stripped including: "Dirrty", "Fighter" and "Beautiful". Several media outlets noted the absence of "Can't Hold Us Down" from the compilation. The songs are followed by her most recent efforts at that time, her fifth studio album, Back to Basics, which was described as a "pop-soul-jazz-blues opus" by Digital Spy writer Nick Levine. The compilation featured the three singles from the album including the critically acclaimed top-ten song "Ain't No Other Man", "Hurt" and an alternate mix of the "tongue-in-cheek retro-pop" song, "Candyman".

The compilation ends with four new songs produced by Linda Perry. Two of these songs are remakes of her previous singles, "Genie 2.0" ("Genie in a Bottle"), and "You Are What You Are (Beautiful)" ("Beautiful"). The former received comparisons to Kelly Osbourne's "One Word" and was described as "stellar sonic". The other new songs were "Keeps Gettin' Better" and "Dynamite". A Rolling Stone reviewer noted the new material was electropop themed and reminiscent of Lady Gaga's work.

Some of Aguilera's songs were also added to international versions of the compilation. The radio edit of "The Voice Within" from Stripped was added to the UK and Japanese editions while "Ven Conmigo (Solamente Tú)" and "Falsas Esperanzas", both from Mi Reflejo and the former being the Spanish version of Aguilera's number-one song "Come On Over Baby (All I Want Is You)", were added to the Spanish and Argentine editions.

== Promotion ==
"Keeps Gettin' Better" was released as the lead single from the album and was released on September 22, 2008. An accompanying video saw Aguilera as Catwoman and performing in front of green screens. The single experienced moderate commercial success, peaking at number seven on the US Billboard Hot 100 and number four on the Canadian Hot 100. On September 7, 2008, Aguilera performed a medley of "Genie 2.0" and "Keeps Gettin' Better" at the 2008 MTV Video Music Awards in Hollywood. On November 23, Aguilera opened the American Music Awards of 2008 with a seven-minute medley of her previous singles, which included "Beautiful", "Keeps Gettin' Better", "Genie in a Bottle", "Dirrty", "Ain't No Other Man", and "Fighter".

"Dynamite" was released as a promotional single in Japan on November 20, 2008. It was released to the iTunes Store in the United States, too. On January 14, 2009, the song received airplay in Russia, as reported by Tophit. It reached number 146 on the Russian Airplay Chart.

== Critical reception ==
Professional ratings
Review scores
Source	Rating
AllMusic	4.5/5 stars
Digital Spy	4/5 stars
Entertainment Weekly	B+
Rolling Stone	3/5 stars
Sputnikmusic	4.0/5
Slant Magazine	3.5/5 stars

Keeps Gettin' Better: A Decade of Hits received generally positive reviews from music critics.

AllMusic writer Stephen Thomas Erlewine commented that the compilation "proves that no other teen pop singer of her era has a better track record than Christina and if the new songs are any indication, the title of this hits comp is no lie either." Nick Levine from Digital Spy noted the "spunky attitude" of the compilation and compared her recordings to those of Britney Spears: "She may have started out with similar material to another Mickey Mouse Club alumnus, but Aguilera moved on to bigger and better things more quickly than Britney." He further complimented Aguilera's songwriting skills. Chris Willman from Entertainment Weekly noted the lack of traditional Aguilera styles on the new songs, stating: "The singer has banished melisma and belting from these electronic confections, and her chops sound just as hot set on simmer." Writing for Sputnikmusic, Nick Butler positively reviewed Aguilera's new material, saying: "Christina the pop singer is dead, long live Electro Christina [...] At any rate, these four tracks are more than enough to build anticipation for what could be a very, very good album."

In a mixed review, an editor from Rolling Stone said that the album's "ten stellar singles are weighed down by four bland attempts at 2008's trendy, Lady Gaga-jacking electropop."

== Commercial performance ==
In the United States, Keeps Gettin' Better: A Decade of Hits debuted at number nine on the US Billboard 200 on the issue date of November 29, 2008, selling 73,000 copies in its first week of release. The album spent six weeks on the Top Catalog Albums, where it peaked at number 2 in 2010. As of 2019, the greatest hits album has sold over 614,000 copies. In Canada, the album charted at number twelve on the Canadian Albums Chart.

In Australia, Keeps Gettin' Better: A Decade of Hits peaked at number eight on the ARIA Albums Chart on the issue date of November 23, 2008 and spent nine weeks on the chart. It was certified Platinum for sales of over 70,000 copies. In New Zealand, it peaked at number fifteen on the Official New Zealand Music Chart in November 2008 and was certified Gold in 2020. In Austria, the album debuted at number ten on the Austrian Albums Chart on the issue date of November 21, 2008 and remained on the chart for five weeks. The album also experienced moderate success in various European regions, including France (number seven), Ireland and Finland (number nine). In the United Kingdom, the greatest hits peaked at number ten and was certified 2x platinum for selling over 600,000 copies. The album reached number 15 on the Mexican chart, as reported by AMPROFON in November 2008. On Taiwanese Albums Chart, Keeps Gettin' Better: A Decade of Hits debuted at the top spot.

== Track listing ==
Standard edition (CD)
No.	Title	Writer(s)	Producer(s)	Length
1.	"Genie in a Bottle" (from Christina Aguilera, 1999)	Steve Kipner; David Frank; Pam Sheyne	Frank; Kipner	3:36
2.	"What a Girl Wants" (video mix) (from Christina Aguilera, 1999)	Shelly Peiken; Guy Roche	Roche	3:35
3.	"I Turn to You" (album version) (from Christina Aguilera, 1999)	Diane Warren	Roche	4:39
4.	"Come On Over Baby (All I Want Is You)" (radio version) (from Christina Aguilera, 1999)	Christina Aguilera; Johan Åberg; Pauli Reinikainen; Ron Fair; Roche; Raymond Cham; Chaka Blackmon; Eric Dawkins; Peiken	ChakDaddy; Sol Survivor; E. Dawk; Fair	3:23
5.	"Dirrty" (featuring Redman) (from Stripped, 2002)	Aguilera; Dana Stinson; Balewa Muhammad; Reginald Noble	Rockwilder; Aguilera; Muhammad^{[a]}; Cameron^{[a]}	4:45
6.	"Fighter" (from Stripped, 2002)	Aguilera; Scott Storch	Storch; Aguilera^{[a]}; E. Dawk^{[a]}	4:05
7.	"Beautiful" (from Stripped, 2002)	Linda Perry	Perry	3:59
8.	"Ain't No Other Man" (from Back to Basics, 2006)	Aguilera; Chris E. Martin; Kara DioGuardi; Charles Roane; Harold Beatty	DJ Premier; Roane^{[b]}; Aguilera^{[c]}; Rob Lewis^{[a]}	3:48
9.	"Candyman" (single mix) (from Back to Basics, 2006)	Aguilera; Perry	Perry	3:14
10.	"Hurt" (from Back to Basics, 2006)	Aguilera; Perry; Mark Ronson	Perry	4:03
11.	"Genie 2.0"	Kipner; Frank; Sheyne	Perry	4:15
12.	"Keeps Gettin' Better"	Aguilera; Perry	Perry	3:04
13.	"Dynamite"	Aguilera; Perry	Perry	3:09
14.	"You Are What You Are (Beautiful)"	Perry	Perry	4:44
Total length:				54:22

Deluxe edition (DVD)
No.	Title	Director(s)	Length
1.	"Genie in a Bottle" (music video)	Diane Martel	3:37
2.	"What a Girl Wants" (music video)	Martel	4:06
3.	"I Turn to You" (music video)	Rupert C. Almont	4:04
4.	"Come on Over Baby (All I Want Is You)" (music video)	Paul Hunter	3:52
5.	"Dirrty" (featuring Redman) (music video)	David LaChapelle	4:49
6.	"Fighter" (music video)	Floria Sigismondi	4:15
7.	"Beautiful" (music video)	Jonas Åkerlund	4:07
8.	"Ain't No Other Man" (music video)	Bryan Barber	4:53
9.	"Candyman" (music video)	Matthew Rolston; Aguilera	3:15
10.	"Hurt" (music video)	Sigismondi; Aguilera	4:04

=== Notes ===
- ^{^[a]} signifies a vocal producer.
- ^{^[b]} signifies a co-producer.
- ^{^[c]} signifies an additional producer.
- International editions include the tracks "Nobody Wants to Be Lonely" (with Ricky Martin) and Lady Marmalade (with Lil' Kim, Mýa and Pink).
- UK and Japanese edition include additionally the radio edit of "The Voice Within".
- Spanish and Argentine edition include the tracks "Ven Conmigo (Solamente Tú)", "Falsas Esperanzas", and "Lady Marmalade".

== Charts ==
=== Weekly charts ===
Chart (2008–2010)	Peak position
Australian Albums (ARIA)	8
Austrian Albums (Ö3 Austria)	10
Belgian Albums (Ultratop Flanders)	23
Belgian Albums (Ultratop Wallonia)	24
Canadian Albums (Billboard)	12
Danish Albums (Hitlisten)	15
Dutch Albums (Album Top 100)	28
Finnish Albums (Suomen virallinen lista)	9
Finnish Midprice Albums (Musiikkituottajat)	6
French Albums (SNEP)	7
German Albums (Offizielle Top 100)	20
Greek Albums (IFPI)	13
Hungarian Albums (MAHASZ)	35
Italian Albums (FIMI)	15
Irish Albums (IRMA)	9
Japanese Albums (Oricon)	5
Mexican Albums (Top 100 Mexico)	15
New Zealand Albums (RMNZ)	15
Scottish Albums (Official Charts)	10
South Korean International Albums (Gaon)	30
Spanish Albums (Promusicae)	34
Swedish Albums (Sverigetopplistan)	41
Swiss Albums (Schweizer Hitparade)	14
Taiwanese Albums (Five Music)	1
UK Albums (Official Charts)	10
US Billboard 200	9

=== Year-end charts ===
Chart (2008)	Position
Australian Albums (ARIA)	95
UK Albums (OCC)	140
Chart (2009)	Position
US Billboard 200	168

== Certifications ==
Region	Certification	Certified units/sales
Australia (ARIA)	Platinum	70,000^{^}
Ireland (IRMA)	Gold	7,500^{^}
Japan (RIAJ)	Gold	100,000^{^}
New Zealand (RMNZ)	Gold	7,500^{‡}
Russia (NFPF)	Gold	10,000^{*}
United Kingdom (BPI)	2× Platinum	600,000^{‡}
United States (RIAA)	Gold	614,000
^{*} Sales figures based on certification alone.^{^} Shipments figures based on certification alone.^{‡} Sales+streaming figures based on certification alone.

== Release history ==
Country	Date	Format	Edition	Label	Ref.
Japan	November 6, 2008	Digital download	Standard	RCA; Jive	
United Kingdom	November 6, 2008	Digital download	Standard	RCA; Jive	
Germany	November 7, 2008	CD	Standard	Sony Music	
Germany	November 7, 2008	Digital download	Standard	RCA; Jive	
United Kingdom	November 10, 2008	CD + DVD	Deluxe	RCA	
United States	November 11, 2008	CD	Standard	RCA	
Japan	November 12, 2008	CD + DVD	Limited	Sony Music	
