= Keeps Gettin' Better =

2008 single by Christina Aguilera

Single by Christina Aguilera

from the album Keeps Gettin' Better: A Decade of Hits
- Released: September 22, 2008
- Recorded: 2008
- Studio: Kung Fu Gardens (North Hollywood, CA)
- Genre: Electroclash; electropop
- Length: 3:02
- Label: RCA
- Songwriters: Christina Aguilera; Linda Perry
- Producer: Linda Perry

Christina Aguilera singles chronology
"Oh Mother" (2007)	"Keeps Gettin' Better" (2008)	"Not Myself Tonight" (2010)

Music video
- "Keeps Gettin' Better" on YouTube

"Keeps Gettin' Better" is a song by American singer Christina Aguilera from her first greatest hits album, Keeps Gettin' Better: A Decade of Hits (2008). It was released as the album's lead single on September 22, 2008, by RCA Records. The song was written by Aguilera and Linda Perry, with the latter producing the song. After giving birth to her son Max, Aguilera looked to "come up with something new and fresh", developing a "futuristic" era of her career. "Keeps Gettin' Better" is an electroclash and electropop song, and was inspired by the likes of Andy Warhol and Goldfrapp. Its lyrics portray Aguilera as a superheroine.

Upon its release, "Keeps Gettin' Better" received generally mixed reviews from music critics but nonetheless achieved international success on the charts. It became Aguilera's highest debut on the US Billboard Hot 100 at number seven, marking her 8th Top 10 hit. Internationally, the song reached number 2 in Turkey, number 4 in Canada and number 14 in the UK, while charting within the top 20 in Austria, Croatia, Germany, Ireland, Italy, Japan and Slovakia. Additionally, "Keeps Gettin' Better" topped the US Dance Club Songs chart.

The accompanying music video, directed by Peter Berg, features Aguilera in an editing room, producing the music video on a green screen. Using the equipment there, she creates several characters, including a blonde 1960s inspired hippie character, another based on Catwoman, and a futuristic blue-haired version of herself. Aguilera debuted the song during a live performance at the 2008 MTV Video Music Awards. Wearing a catsuit, she sang a remix of "Genie in a Bottle", before performing "Keeps Gettin' Better". Aguilera also performed the song during a promotional tour for the album, and as part of a medley of her greatest hits on the 36th Annual American Music Awards.

== Background ==
"Keeps Gettin' Better" was released almost a year after Aguilera gave birth to her first son, Max. She told MSN that "Growing into being a woman, a mother, it's a very different time in my life, and also where I'm at musically". Throughout her career, Aguilera has been noted for her reinventions. She stated that with "Keeps Gettin' Better", she wished to "come up with something new and fresh", calling the new redefined era of her music "futuristic". Aguilera said that the development of new songs featured on Keeps Gettin' Better: A Decade of Hits was influenced by artists such as Blondie, Velvet Underground and Nico. Visually, artists Andy Warhol and Roy Lichtenstein were credited as influences for the album. After stating the theme of the record was futuristic, she said to MTV News that the era has a "very pop-art feel visually". Aguilera also stated that she had been "diving deep" into "electro in particular" at the time, noting that she had started connections to collaborate with prominent dance artists Goldfrapp and Ladytron. While talking to MTV News, Aguilera discussed the influence behind the track and the album, and said:

I wanted to give [fans] a little sneak preview of what's to come [with the VMA performance]. The vein of the new material is a futuristic take on what is inspiring me at the moment ... and it's got a very pop-art feel, visually. [There's a] throwback to Andy Warhol and all the colors and vividness and bright boldness that was in that artwork. I'm a big collector of pop art and graffiti art at this point, too — D*Face and Banksy, also Roy Lichtenstein ... and it's been very fun venturing off into that zone.

== Composition ==
"Keeps Gettin' Better"
A sample of "Keeps Gettin' Better", which features Aguilera singing against a futuristic synth instrumental.

"Keeps Gettin' Better" was written by Aguilera and Linda Perry, while production was done by the latter. It is an electropop song, written in the key of F minor. Aguilera's vocals in the track span from the note of F_{3} to the note of C_{5}. Meanwhile, Shahryar Rizvi from the Dallas Observer described it as electroclash. The song has also been noted by The Times as an "electro-glam" number. Described as a "muscular, percussive arena-ready" track, the song garnered comparisons to Goldfrapp's Supernature album and Britney Spears' song "Womanizer". An "instantly engaging" electropop beat begins the track; it additionally features "space-age sounds" in response to its futuristic concept, with a "throbbing" synth line. Lyrically, themes of female empowerment and being a superhero are dominant on the track. Aguilera sings, "Some days I'm a super bitch". The lyrics derive from Aguilera's experience as a mother. While talking to MSN, she said:

After having my own child, it's pretty amazing what females are capable of. We're Supergirl, we do it all: we give the love, we give the milk. On the other hand, I'm running a business. I'm running my career. That comes with being labeled a bitch. If that's what I'm gonna be called by being assertive and knowing who I am and what I want out of life, then so be it. I will wear that label proudly. For me it's about turning that word into a positive.

== Critical reception ==
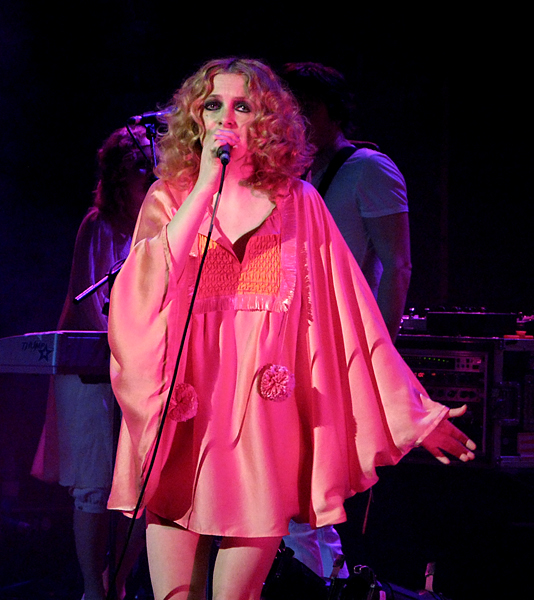
Critics compared "Keeps Gettin' Better" to works by Goldfrapp (photo: Alison Goldfrapp, one member of the group).

"Keeps Gettin' Better" received generally mixed reviews from music critics. Chris Willman from Entertainment Weekly responded to the new additions of the compilation saying, "The singer has banished melisma and belting from these electronic confections, and her chops sound just as hot set on simmer." Nick Butler from Sputnikmusic positively received the song and "Dynamite" saying "Christina the pop singer is dead, long live Electro Christina". Nick Levine from Digital Spy called the song a "welcome change" from Aguilera's 2006 Back to Basics album, but stated that the song is not one of Aguilera's best singles. Fraser McAlpine from BBC wrote a mixed review for the song, recognizing Aguilera's maturity in the lyrics. However, he confessed that this could easily be a song by Pink, who might have made a better job of making it her own. AllMusic writer Stephen Thomas Erlewine said that the singer was instantly overshadowed by fellow singer Britney Spears, but "Keeps Gettin' Better" proves that no other teen pop singer of her era has a better track than Aguilera, concluding that if the new songs are any indication, the title of the hits compilation [Keeps Gettin' Better: A Decade of Hits] is no lie either.

Gavin Martin from The Mirror gave a mixed response, as he said: "Nothing dates as quickly as pop that dares to call itself futuristic". Martin awarded the song 3/5 and concluded with "It's not that this new number from the forthcoming Greatest Hits set is bad – but it's a whole lot more routine than it pretends to be." Sal Cinquemani from Slant Magazine commented on the possibly outdated dance theme. Responding to the new additions of the record including "Keeps Gettin' Better", he noted: "Not exactly what one would call original, but if it's true the singer's next studio album will reprise this electro-pop sound, Aguilera deserves credit for refusing to play it safe." Bill Lamb from About.com awarded the track three stars. He noted Aguilera's dance-inspired effort, at a time of dance dominance in the industry, negatively and stated that "the catchy electro-pop vibe isn't enough to make it one of her more memorable efforts." Rolling Stone noted that in the compilation, Aguilera's old singles are "weighed down by four bland attempts at 2008's trendy, Lady Gaga-jacking electropop". Paul Thompson and Amy Phillips from Pitchfork Media said that the track was "basically a ripoff" of Goldfrapp's "Ooh La La".

== Chart performance ==
"Keeps Gettin' Better" sold 143,895 legal downloads in its first week dated September 30, 2008, debuting at number seven on the Billboard Hot 100 a few weeks later. This has become Aguilera's highest debut on the chart and became her first top ten hit since "Ain't No Other Man" in 2006. As of August 2014, it has sold 1.156 million digital copies in the US. The song has performed well on the Canadian Hot 100 chart; it debuted at number 16, and a week later the song became the "Greatest Airplay, Sales Gainer", peaking at number four. However, the track only spent one week within the top ten. It debuted and peaked at number 21 in Swedish Singles Chart, and reached number 14 in the United Kingdom. On September 21, 2008, the song debuted and peaked on the Australian ARIA Charts at number 26. "Keeps Gettin' Better" reached number two on the Turkish Singles Chart, as reported by Billboard Türkiye in November 2008.

== Music video ==
=== Background ===
Directed by Peter Berg, the music video for the song is said to have been influenced by films Minority Report and the James Bond series, and was conceived to show Aguilera "through time and fashion in an homage to her 10-year career" according to a statement by her label. Popjustice saw the music video in progress on October 22, 2008, in the edit they reported that the music video was produced on a green screen, but the concept of the video was to be Aguilera in an edit suite pressing various flashing buttons, editing what was her own music video. Aguilera herself discussed the production of the video, saying "I really enjoyed making the video for 'Keeps Gettin' Better', being an artist who likes to play around with different looks, it was a lot of fun to portray various characters within the same shoot." The music video debuted on iLike, an online music service on October 27, 2008.

=== Synopsis ===
Aguilera as seen in the music video, portraying a Catwoman-like heroine, in a comic book style, presented on a holographic touch screen

The music video starts with multi-colored, digital waves which then merge into a scene where Aguilera is sat in an editing suite overlooking a sound and edit board. Pressing flashing buttons, multiple large screens stand in front of the desk and correspond to her choice of button selected. The first images shown on the screens feature Aguilera as Catwoman, a futuristic blue-haired character, and a 1960s-influenced hippie, before focusing on the 1960-inspired character. The blond character is shown to be holding an old-fashioned handheld video camera filming scenes of high-rise buildings, all the while showing shots of Aguilera editing the onscreen projection. The blond hippie-inspired character is then seen in a second setting, riding a bicycle through a grassy field at times performing dance movements to the song and lip-synching.

Aguilera then takes a touch screen Nokia 5800 XpressMusic phone from her pocket with an image of a futuristic blue-haired character, after producing a scene of a convertible car, she inputs the character from the phone onto the screen and into the car and the blue-haired character is then shown driving. Aguilera then produces silhouettes of a catwoman-style figure, until Aguilera as the catwoman character is shown, wearing a leather catsuit with cat ears, lightning bolts shoot from her hands until another scene featuring the same character shows her alongside a black motorbike holding a gun. Shots of both the blue-haired character and catwoman lead to a scene featuring a blond Aguilera moving inside of the screens accompanied by multi-colored digital waves, before shots of the catwoman-style character on a motorbike, shooting the gun are presented. Shots of the different scenes including one of Aguilera at the desk accompanied by a toy robot are shown finishing as Aguilera turns the screens off.

=== Reception ===
Gil Kaufman from MTV News called the video "geektastic". Popjustice also gave the video a positive review, saying: "The video's a riot of costume changes, makeovers, multiple 'scenarios' and Christina even seems to look like she's having fun. We'd sort of forgotten the single was even coming out, but the video makes it all seem quite exciting." Anna Pickard from The Guardian heavily compared Aguilera to Britney Spears in the video, saying: "We're at a final count of four Christinas to five Britneys. [...] We can't be seen to have achieved a perfect Xtina/Britney balance. [...] We'd probably need a guest appearance from Madonna for that". She also felt that "the 30-second Target advert is better than the whole video. But still: any release that makes it compulsory to type 'Christina Aguilera Keeps Getting Better' is surely a clever ploy".

== Live performances ==
At a press conference in Paramount Studios in Los Angeles, Aguilera confirmed that she would be performing at the 2008 MTV Video Music Awards on September 7, 2008. She discussed about allowing her newly born son, Max, to watch the performance, saying: "This will be his first time watching me perform on television, but only for a little while because he's not really allowed to watch television yet. I'll make an exception for the VMAs." Aguilera discussed the concept of the performance beforehand saying: "You're going to get a first look and a first listen at my new image and my new sound. The last album, the style and sound was about vintage glam — this one is all about the future". The performance began with Aguilera standing in a tower of neon-lit boxes, singing "Genie 2.0" while wearing second-skin leather catsuit accessorized with silver armbands, a black-leather cat mask, black cape and platinum-blond hair. Then, she began performing "Keeps Gettin' Better". Nick Levine from Digital Spy called the performance "sassy, slickly-choreographed".

Aguilera made an appearance at the Thisday Africa Rising at the London's Royal Albert Hall, where she performed several old hits and "Keeps Gettin' Better". She also performed the song as part of the tour in Kyiv, Ukraine, on October 20 and 21. The last date was held on October 24 in Abu Dhabi, at the Emirates Palace Hotel. On November 23, Aguilera promoted her greatest hits album by performing at the 36th Annual American Music Awards. She opened the show with a seven-minute medley including six of her greatest hits. The Los Angeles Times' Todd Martens commented about the performance: "Things get started in familiar territory, with an Aguilera medley, the first of what is sure to be many whiplash-inducing musical performances this evening. But unlike her MTV VMA run-down, Aguilera backs into "Genie in a Bottle" rather than opening with it. [...] Opening with the ballad allowed Aguilera to flex her vocal muscles, but the zipping between songs never allowed her - or her background dancers - to catch a groove".

== Accolades ==
Year	Ceremony	Category	Result	Ref.
2008	J-Wave Awards	Song of the Year	Nominated	
2008	MTV Russia Music Awards	Best Video	Nominated	
2009	EarOne Awards	Best Song	Won	

== Track listing and formats ==
- Digital download
1. "Keeps Gettin' Better" – 3:02
- Australian CD single
1. "Keeps Gettin' Better" – 3:02
2. "Keeps Gettin' Better" (Instrumental) – 3:02
- German CD single
1. "Keeps Gettin' Better" – 3:02
2. "Keeps Gettin' Better" (Tom Neville's Worse For Wear Remix) – 7:25

== Credits and personnel ==
Credits for "Keeps Gettin' Better" adapted from the single liner notes.

- Christina Aguilera — lead vocals, background vocals, songwriting
- Linda Perry — songwriting, producer, all instruments, programming, engineering
- Marc Jameson — drum programming

== Charts ==
=== Weekly charts ===
Chart (2008–2009)	Peak position
Australia (ARIA)	26
Austria (Ö3 Austria Top 40)	15
Belgium (Ultratip Bubbling Under Flanders)	10
Belgium (Ultratip Bubbling Under Wallonia)	8
Canada Hot 100 (Billboard)	4
Canada CHR/Top 40 (Billboard)	9
Canada Hot AC (Billboard)	6
CIS Airplay (TopHit)	49
Croatia (HRT)	10
European Hot 100 Singles (Billboard)	29
Germany (GfK)	14
Germany Airplay (MusicTrace)	11
Global Dance Tracks (Billboard)	19
Hungary (Editors' Choice Top 40)	27
Ireland (IRMA)	14
Italy (FIMI)	12
Italy Airplay (EarOne)	6
Japan Hot 100 (Billboard)	17
Latvia (Latvijas Top 50)	28
Mexico (Billboard Ingles Airplay)	35
Netherlands (Dutch Top 40 Tipparade)	6
New Zealand (Recorded Music NZ)	36
New Zealand Pop Airplay (Recorded Music NZ)	17
Slovakia Airplay (ČNS IFPI)	13
Switzerland (Schweizer Hitparade)	21
Turkey (Türkiye Top 20)	2
UK Singles (Official Charts)	14
US Billboard Hot 100	7
US Adult Pop Airplay (Billboard)	21
US Dance Club Songs (Billboard)	7
US Pop Airplay (Billboard)	11
US Pop 100 Airplay (Billboard)	11
Venezuela (Record Report)	7

=== Year-end charts ===
Chart (2008)	Position
Canada (Canadian Hot 100)	85
Germany Airplay (MusicTrace)	70

== Release history ==
Region	Date	Format(s)	Label(s)	Ref.
United States	September 22, 2008	Digital download	RCA	
Russia	October 15, 2008	Contemporary hit radio	Sony Music	
Australia	October 25, 2008	Digital download	Sony Music	
Canada	October 31, 2008	Digital download	Sony Music	
United Kingdom	October 31, 2008	Digital download	RCA	
Australia	November 3, 2008	CD	Sony Music	
Germany	November 7, 2008	CD	Sony Music	
Various	December 16, 2008	Digital download (EP)	RCA	
