= Genie in a Bottle =

1999 single by Christina Aguilera

Single by Christina Aguilera

from the album Christina Aguilera
- B-side: "Blessed"; "We're a Miracle"; "Don't Make Me Love You"
- Released: May 11, 1999
- Studio: Image Recording (Los Angeles)
- Genre: Soul-pop; teen pop; dance-pop; R&B
- Length: 3:36
- Label: RCA
- Songwriters: David Frank; Steve Kipner; Pamela Sheyne
- Producers: David Frank; Steve Kipner

Christina Aguilera singles chronology
"Reflection" (1998)	"Genie in a Bottle" (1999)	"What a Girl Wants" (1999)

Music video
- "Genie in a Bottle" on YouTube

"Genie in a Bottle" is a song by the American singer Christina Aguilera from her self-titled debut album (1999). Pam Sheyne, Steve Kipner, and David Frank wrote the track; the latter two produced it. RCA Records released "Genie in a Bottle" as the album's lead single on May 11, 1999. A soul-pop, teen pop, and dance-pop song with elements of R&B, "Genie in a Bottle" uses sexual references to address themes of self-respect and abstinence: Aguilera's narration affirms to a love interest that to be with her, they have to know the right way to please her.

Reviews of "Genie in a Bottle" generally praised the production as catchy and Aguilera's vocals as soulful and expressive. It was nominated for Best Female Pop Vocal Performance at the 42nd Annual Grammy Awards in 2000. The single reached number one on record charts of 21 countries and has been certified double Platinum in Canada and the United Kingdom. In the United States, "Genie in a Bottle" spent five weeks atop the Billboard Hot 100 chart and has been certified triple Platinum by the Recording Industry Association of America.

Diane Martel directed the music video for "Genie in a Bottle", which was shot in Malibu, California. The video received heavy rotation on MTV's Total Request Live. "Genie in a Bottle" is one of Aguilera's signature songs, and was credited with establishing her name and for playing a part in the teen pop craze of the late 1990s. A Spanish version of the song titled "Genio Atrapado" was included on Mi Reflejo (2000), and the electropop remake "Genie 2.0" was included on Keeps Gettin' Better: A Decade of Hits (2008). "Genie in a Bottle" was covered by multiple artists, including Dove Cameron, Darren Criss and Speedway.

== Background ==
After receiving notification that the final season of The New Mickey Mouse Club (1993–94) would air, cast member Aguilera became determined to release her debut studio album during her senior year in high school. She began recording sessions with producers Roberts Alleca and Michael Brown, but was displeased with the pace of her developing career. Despite being offered free studio time with Alleca and Brown, Aguilera ventured to Japan in an effort to boost her career. While there, the pair offered her the opportunity to collaborate with Japanese pop star Keizo Nakanishi on the track "All I Wanna Do" (1994), though the project failed to achieve commercial success. As her international successes broadened, Aguilera caught the attention of future manager Steve Kurtz; she had previously had a verbal agreement with Ruth Inniss, which was never later formalized.

Kurtz spent much of his time devoted to finding Aguilera a record deal, sending demos to multiple companies. Just as communications with RCA Records began, she was offered the chance to record "Reflection", the theme song for the 1998 Disney film Mulan. Its success landed her a multi-album recording contract. RCA's financial state prevented them from contending with major labels at the time. In an attempt to encourage Aguilera to sign with them and maintain the hype surrounding "Reflection", they offered to record and release her debut studio album by January 1999, though such an arrangement ultimately failed to happen. Originally, Aguilera "wasn't too crazy" about the demo recording for "Genie in a Bottle", though she eventually became "proud" of the result. RCA executive Ron Fair sympathized with her reaction to the release and inclusion of the track, finding that the marketing decision would be to release a "sugar candy" number one single, something that was not necessarily a "great song" so that her career could strengthen.

== Writing and development ==
EMI executive Carla Ondrasik introduced two of her most prominent songwriters, David Frank and Steve Kipner. They began working together, and later collaborated with writer Pamela Sheyne. The evening before their songwriting appointment, Frank awoke with an idea for a song which consisted of an eight-bar loop with "a lot of different changes". When presenting the track to Sheyne, she performed the lyrics "If you want to be with me", which Frank liked. The three writers continued adding lyrics to a "really fast" writing session; they agreed that intellect was an afterthought, with the main intention to create a "hit song". They agreed a female should serve as the lead singer, at which point Frank recommended that Aguilera record the track.

Aguilera contributed a spoken hook for the song, saying there "wasn't enough time" between the Mulan soundtrack and Christina Aguilera recording sessions for her to provide more lyrical offerings. She later said that she had a substantial role in the production, stating that she adjusted instruments and lyrics after being displeased with its "rough beginnings". In the interview for Time Aguilera noted: "I actually had some contribution in writing in the first album. I didn’t know I should have a credit, so I kind of got cheated." Originally presented as "If You Want to Be with Me", Aguilera's management suggested the final name "Genie in a Bottle". The title was conceived to present an Arabian theme, which the label felt they could market with beaded jewelry and clothing to develop the record's theme. Prior to being recorded by Aguilera, the track received much interest from the writers of the up-and-coming girl group Innosense, who felt that the band was more likely to make the song a hit. In an interview, Sheyne said there were three artists interested in the song—Aguilera, Innosense and Paula Abdul. However, Innosense and Abdul did not have completed albums which meant the release of the song would not happen for a while, but Aguilera's debut album was done. The producers and songwriter were told that Aguilera would release the song as her first single from her debut album. RCA Records executive Ron Fair pushed for the track, the writers allowed Aguilera to record the track, and had "no doubt" she was the right performer after she completed the recording.

== Recording ==
The demo track that the record company had heard was used as a basis for Aguilera's actual recording, as she only replaced the vocals on the demo with her own before the writers and producers edited it for improvement. However, after the first recording was completed they felt her vocals were too "hard" sounding; a second proved to deliver the "softer" quality they were after. During the recording process, co-writer Kipner was impressed by Aguilera's performance of complex R&B lines, something he had come to expect only from older artists, and compared her vocal style to that of Chaka Khan, Etta James, and Mariah Carey. Before Frank had met Aguilera most of "Genie in a Bottle" had already been completed, he had heard a tape delivered by RCA featuring Aguilera's performance of "Reflection" but Frank feared she could not perform in a "hip-hop oriented style". The instrumental for "Genie in a Bottle" was almost complete before the entire composition had been finished, it was only when he was contacted by songwriter Pam Sheyne that they progressed in writing the track and later Frank contacted Steve Kipner, "a good friend" of his, and after agreeing to collaborate the three continued writing "Genie in a Bottle".

== Composition ==
"Genie in a Bottle" (1999)
A 22-second sample of Genie in a Bottle's chorus. A teen pop, soul-pop and dance-pop track with elements from R&B, the song uses sexual reference to talk about self-respect.

Reviewers of "Genie in a Bottle" noted the youthful message with The New York Times saying "One of the summer's catchiest singles captures the moment's anxieties about teen-age sex". The track has been described as "blue-eyed-soul" and has been labelled "a skittish dance hit, propelled by indecision "My body's saying let's go [...] but my heart is saying no". The chorus then plays with "bubbly dance beats" as Aguilera metaphorically describes herself as a Genie trapped, and can only be released when rubbed "the right way". She explained "If you listen to the words "My body's saying let's go but my heart is saying no". My heart is saying no. So it's really a song about self-respect and treating me the way I want to be treated before I just give my love away to anybody". Celebrities such as Debbie Gibson spoke out against the song saying she was "horrified" with the lyricism being performed by an 18-year-old; the comment went on to upset Aguilera who found her being a female was restricting what she could perform. Lyricism in the track had sexual references which saw controversy arise, but Larry Flick from Billboard commented, "Fueled by a chugging groove and richly layered vocals, the tune is punctuated by a breathy command to 'rub me the right way.'" Aguilera said that "the song is not about sex, It's about self-respect. It's about not giving in to temptation until you're respected." In Malaysia the controversial lyrics gained it a ban which led Aguilera to re-record some of the lyrics such as; "hormones racing" to "heart-beats racing" and "rub the right way" to "treat me the right way".

"Genie in a Bottle" is written in the key of F minor with a tempo of 84 beats per minute. The song follows a chord progression of Fm – E♭ – D♭, and Aguilera's vocals span from F_{3} to B♭_{4}. According to Billboard's Kenneth Partridge, a thirty-second note bass-drum pattern of the song "mimics the heart palpitations of a teenager in lust."

== Critical reception ==
'Genie', [Aguilera's] ubiquitous first single, became an instant hit due to its catchy chorus and Aguilera's appeal. Besides being her first hit single, the song also separated her from the other pop stars that were coming out at the same time. The single boasted debatably provocative lyrics ('my body's saying let's go' and other lyrics were considered too provocative to be sung by a teen idol some thought. Radio Disney played a censored version of the song on their station). Aguilera quickly established she was different than your typical pop star."

— Yahoo!, Nicole Hogsett describing the song's impact on Aguilera's career

"Genie in a Bottle" received positive acclaim from music critics. Time magazine reporter David E. Thigpen noted that "the song reveals a crystalline voice full of wonderful shadings and with a soulful ring that sets her [Aguilera] apart in the overhyped teen market." Tom Lanham of Entertainment Weekly gave the song a B+ for its predictability after other performers from the Mickey Mouse Club, writing, "Yet another ex-Mouseketeer scampers down the Britney-pop path with a suggestive synth ditty and a husky voice well beyond her 18 years." Lanham wrote that her vocal performance was "uncomfortably adult" but called the track "a sinfully sweet confection". A writer for the Pittsburgh Post-Gazette gave the song a positive review calling it a "smoldering soul-pop" track and described Aguilera's vocals as being "provocative" whilst calling the song a "pleasure" to listen to. In a review for the album Christina Aguilera critic Robert Christgau called the song a "dazzling clever piece of teen self-exploration cum sexploitation". Nana-Adwoa Ofori of the AOL Radio blog listed the song as her top Christina Aguilera song declaring it as her "signature" track. A writer from Daily News found Aguilera to be more capable vocally than the tracks limits but found the track to be "a slice of thumping sensuality". Kenneth Partridge of Billboard simply called it a "great teen-pop song", and praised its musical structure. Chris Malone, also from the Billboard magazine, named "Genie in a Bottle" a "generational touchstone for pop music" in his 2023 retrospective review.

Nicole Hogsett of Yahoo! found the song's appeal was due to the catchy chorus but found the song separated her from other pop stars at the time of the single's release. Hogsett found the song quickly "established she was different than your typical pop star". People called the song "sexy" and "pulsating". A writer for The New York Times "got" the song's youthful message and said "One of the summer's catchiest singles captures the moment's anxieties about teenage sex. 'Genie in a Bottle', sung by the blue-eyed former Mouseketeer Christina Aguilera, is a skittish dance hit propelled by indecision". Pier Dominquez, writer of A Star Is Made found the song could be deemed suggestive but stated the track does not promote sex or promiscuity. He found the sensuality of the song came from Aguilera's vocal delivery and found her ad-libbing something that would set her apart from other artists. Eliseo Cardona, CDNow senior editor, was not satisfied with the translation: "...when Aguilera sings her breakout hit "Genie in the Bottle" in a direct Spanish translation, "Genio atrapado", she sounds funny, if not ill at ease. Indeed, the overly literal Spanish lyrics make for both a good laugh and a better yawn." Parry Gettelman of Orlando Sentinel praised her vocals: "Aguilera's powerhouse style works best on the urban-flavored up-tempo numbers. She uses the more attractive lower end of her range on expanses of 'Genio Atrapado'." Sean Piccoli, music writer of Sun-Sentinel, wrote a positive review: "'Genio Atrapado', the opener, is as cheesy-sexy-cool as the original, 'Genie in a Bottle', her first hit. The translation fits the tune, not vice versa, so Aguilera can still revel in her teenage awakening even without a Spanish equivalent of, 'Ya gotta rub me the right way'." The song was voted as the 18th best song of 1999 by Pazz & Jop. It was nominated for Best Female Pop Vocal Performance at the 42nd Annual Grammy Awards, and won the BMI Award.

== Commercial performance ==
"Throughout the summer of 1999, Christina Aguilera's "Genie in a Bottle" blared from car stereos. The funky pop hit topped the pop charts for weeks, racking up multi-platinum sales. What makes the song's initial success even more astounding is the fact that it topped the charts weeks before an accompanying music video was made. That such unusual success came about through what could be called a casual act makes the song's beginning even more awe-inspiring."

— Ed Hogan describing the success of the track.

"Genie in a Bottle" entered the Billboard Hot 100 at number 61 in the week of July 3, 1999. The following week, it climbed 49 spots to number 12, before entering the top five. The song reached the number one spot on the Billboard Hot 100 chart dated July 31, 1999. Based on strong airplay and CD sales, it stayed at the top spot for five consecutive weeks and became the biggest summer song of 1999. At that point, it had the longest stay at number one for the entire year, tying Ricky Martin's "Livin' la Vida Loca" and Jennifer Lopez's "If You Had My Love", although Carlos Santana would later in the year take the single, "Smooth", to number one on the chart with a ten-week run. According to Billboard, "Genie in a Bottle" was the second best-selling single of 1999, with 1,360,000 units sold, only behind Cher's "Believe" with 1,700,000 copies sold. It also became Aguilera's best-selling physical single to date.

The song also crossed over successfully to other Billboard charts, topping the Mainstream Top 40, Top 40 Tracks, and Rhythmic Top 40 charts. The song even managed to reach the Adult Top 40, and the Spanish version of the song, "Genio Atrapado" (English: "Trapped Genie"), was a modest hit on the Latin chart. Strong sales assured the single a Platinum certification. "Genie in a Bottle" stayed on Billboard Hot 100 for 25 weeks, and 24 weeks in the United Kingdom. Internationally, a similar chart dominance was seen, as the track went to number one in both the United Kingdom and Canada for multiple weeks. It entered the top five in almost every country it charted. It reached number one on the record charts of 21 countries worldwide, as reported by Billboard in January 2000. Overall, the song is Aguilera's second-highest-charting single, behind "Lady Marmalade", a collaboration with Lil' Kim, Mýa and Pink. "Genie in a Bottle" was certified Platinum in Germany for selling over 500,000 units. The single was also certified Platinum in Australia for selling over 70,000 units.

"Genie in a Bottle" was certified Platinum in almost every country it was released in, later ending at No. 7 on the year-end chart in the United States, and No. 7 on the European year-end chart. In the United Kingdom, it sold 172,000 copies in the first week, and spent two weeks at number 1. As of October 2021, it was her third biggest song in the country with 1.04 million copies sold, and 37.2 million streams.

== Music video ==
The music video accompanying the track was directed by Diane Martel in April 1999, who had previously worked on Mariah Carey's "Dreamlover", and was shot in Malibu with surroundings of a beach and a wooden beach house. "I was out on the sand, greased up in, like, baby oil in shorts and a little cut-off top" she recalled. During the video, scenes saw her and others surrounding a campfire and despite this Aguilera recalled the video shoot was "freezing" with crew members all wearing large coats to keep them warm from the cold which Aguilera was struggling with. In most scenes of the video, Aguilera sings and performs a "genie"-inspired choreography with her male dancers in front of the beach. As the video advances, the guys (with Christina's love interest in there) join the beach party. Near the end of the video, all the teens go outside and hang out around a bonfire. Josh Duhamel worked as an extra on the set, and appears in the role called as "a studly partygoer" by Yahoo! Music. The video premiered on both MTV, BET and The Box the week ending on June 20, 1999.

Analyzing the video, A Star Is Made author Pier Dominquez said:

The lighting of the video prominently featured Christina's golden tresses as her best feature, although the singer herself was rather obscured by the dark shadows, suggesting that the record company still did not know what to do with the singer's image. The choreography featured Christina, wearing orange pants and a beaded blouse, with her dance troop behind her, simulating a genie coming out of the bottle. It was filled with symbolism and her dancing was incredible.

The video received heavy rotation on VH1, BET and The Box, as well as reaching the top position on MTV's chart of most played videos for the week. Time's David E. Thigpen noted that the video generated "the kind of genuine enthusiasm on MTV that doesn’t come around much anymore". It was parodied in the music video for the single "All the Small Things" by American pop-punk band Blink-182, although some concluded that the group's basis for satire was thin.

== Live performances ==
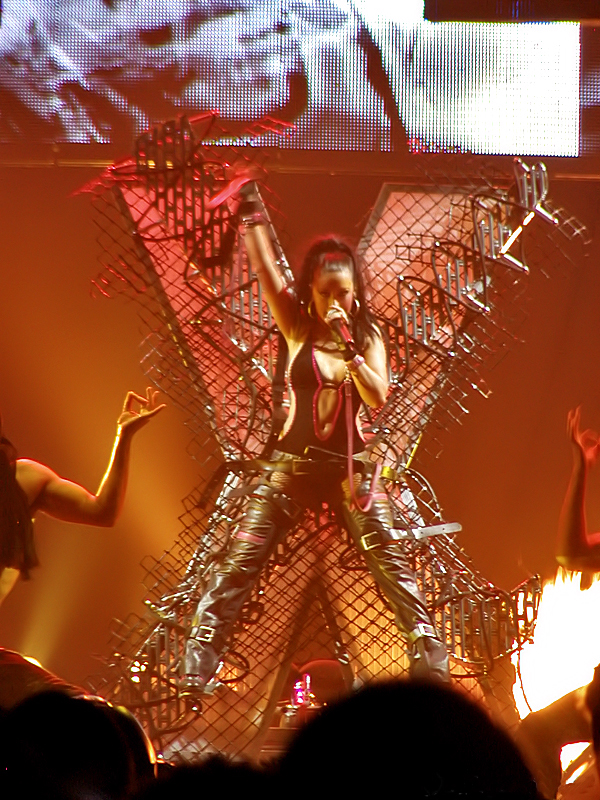
Aguilera performing "Genie in a Bottle" on her Stripped World Tour

Aguilera performed the track on the MTV show TRL among other tracks from her self-titled album. The particular day in which she performed the track, host Carson Daly was not present and Aguilera publicly declared she had "missed" him which led to a media frenzy surrounding a rumored romance between Daly and herself. The following month, Aguilera performed on the British television chart show Top of the Pops and during the same episode that her performance was aired on, Mariah Carey performed her track "Heartbreaker" which led Aguilera to announce to the media her appreciation and her willingness to meet the performer. Once again her performance on Top of the Pops had gathered more controversy than she had wished and soon a feud erupted from Carey's team which critics noted was due to the lack of success stemming from her album Rainbow and the consistent comparisons between the pair. Aguilera also performed at the National Building Museum for the Children's National Medical Center in the company of president Bill Clinton; later she performed for WFLZ's Y-2 concert in Florida with 15,000 fans viewing, wearing a silver top and gem studded jeans with a blue-sequined bandana performing the track on both occasions. It was announced by MTV in 1999 that Aguilera would perform live on their New Year's Eve Special. Wearing "tight" leather trousers, Aguilera performed the track live as the first song in her set which was then followed by "What a Girl Wants".

"Genie in a Bottle" was also performed during her 2002–03 Justified & Stripped Tour, a concert tour which was held in order to support Aguilera's album Stripped (2002) and Justin Timberlake's Justified (2002). The "Egyptian-turned-metal version" performance featured Aguilera in her pink straps attached to her outfit rolling on a giant "X", which portrayed her contemporary alter ego "Xtina". It included Middle Eastern keyboards and 80's hair-metal guitar, where she slowly released herself as a "genie" as male dancers danced around her. On November 23, 2008, she performed the song while promoting her compilation album Keeps Gettin' Better: A Decade of Hits, at the 36th Annual American Music Awards. She opened the show with a seven-minute medley of her greatest hits, which also included "Beautiful", "Keeps Gettin' Better", "Dirrty", "Ain't No Other Man" and "Fighter".

In July 2021, Aguilera performed the song for two nights at the Hollywood Bowl with Gustavo Dudamel and the Los Angeles Philharmonic. She later performed a gothic-style, rock-inspired rendition of "Genie in a Bottle" during the 47th People's Choice Awards, and sang it again during her Dubai concert, at the Expo 2020. "Genie in a Bottle" was part of Aguilera's setlist at the EuroPride concert in Malta in September 2023.

== Legacy and media usage ==
"Genie in a Bottle" has been widely regarded as one of Aguilera's signature songs. This song gained her mainstream success and credibility among music critics. It is also credited for redefining the sound of late 1990s music. Rolling Stone says about Aguilera, "Even in her teen-pop "Genie in a Bottle" days, she was modeling her dramatic, melismatic technique on old-school soul heroines like Etta James". It was ranked fifth on Rolling Stone's list of the biggest 1990s summer songs — a sentiment shared by the Billboard magazine in July 2020. It was also ranked #38th on VH1's 100 Greatest Songs of the '90s. In July 2020 a digital publication The Pudding carried out a study on the most iconic songs from the '90s and songs that are most known by Millennials and the people of Generation Z. "Genie in a Bottle" was the twentieth song with the highest recognisability rate. The single was listed in the book titled The 7,500 Most Important Songs of the Rock and Roll Era: 1944–2000 by Bruce Pollock. and two other publications about best of all-time music — Paul Morley's Words and Music: A History of Pop in the Shape of a City, and 2004 of the Best Songs of the Century by Giannis Petridis. Blender ranked the song on its 2005 list of the 500 greatest songs of the 1980s–2000s.

Bustle writer Sabienna Bowman called the song "a masterpiece of musical achievement" saying that the song "either about sex or self respect, depending on who you asked — was the anthem of the summer 1999". Bowman added that the song is "still everything that was so good about '90s pop music". Vice writer Nick Levine also agreed that song allowed Aguilera to take on a "full-on pop phenomenon" persona, adding that "[a]longside [Britney] Spears, Aguilera is the most iconic pop star of her era". In 2021, Bustle writers Anneliese Cooper and Jake Viswanath also added that Aguilera changed "the landscape of pop music forever". Rolling Stone writer Anthony Bozza noted that,

Aguilera's introduction, "Genie in a Bottle", is sugary pop – once heard, never purged – but it doesn't showcase her vocal strength or control. Unlike most teen poppers, Aguilera can cut it without a multitrack studio. Imagewise, she isn't the typical red-cheeked kid next door, either. She's a teen diva, a kind of legal Lolita, proffering precocious "Oops, did I say that?" innuendo and belting songs like her life depends on it. She comports herself like a pro, as if she were born with a mike in her hand, donning platform booties.

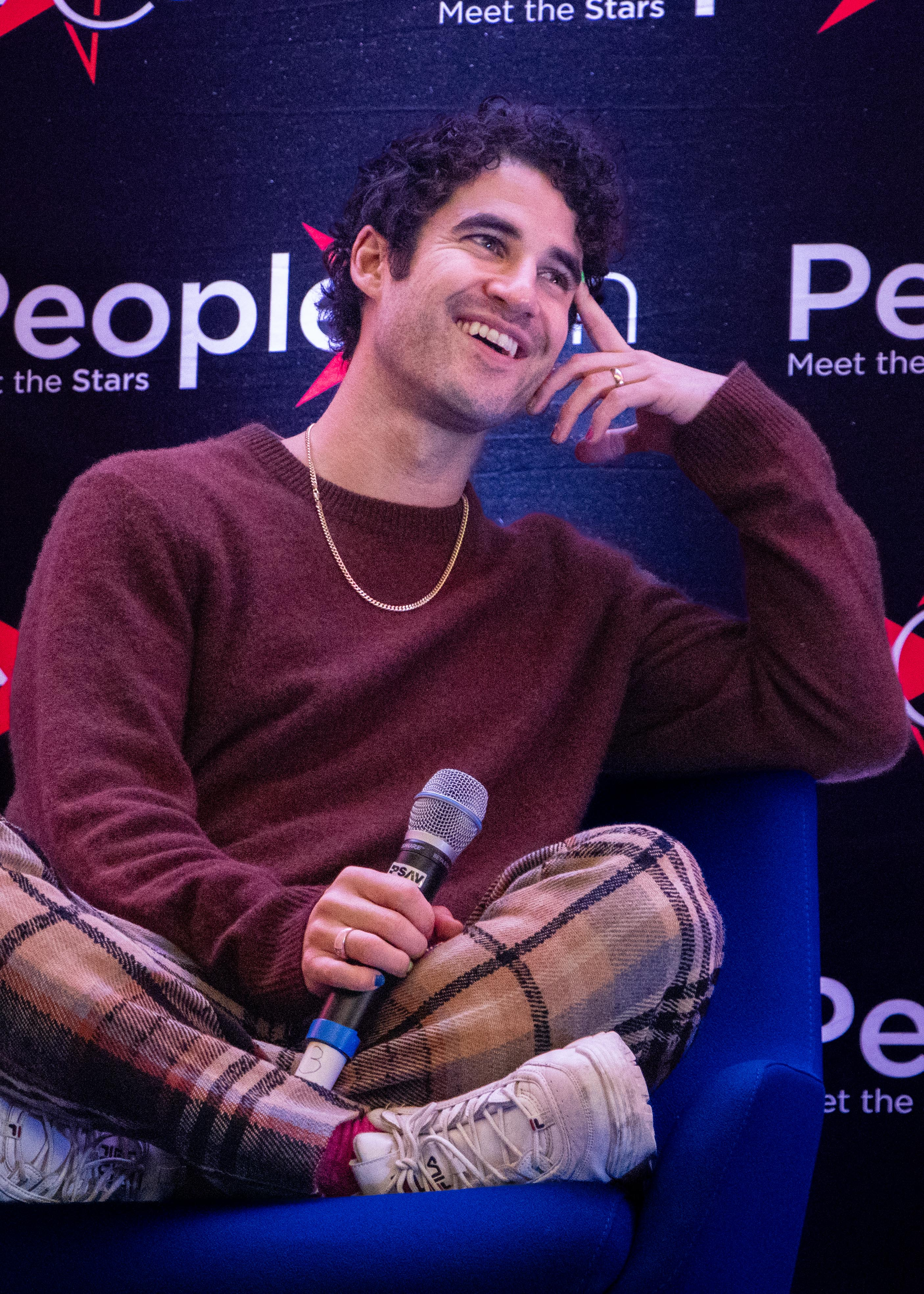
Darren Criss covered the song in 2018.

In an effort to maintain the "buzz" surrounding both the record and Aguilera, RCA set up a guest spot for her to perform the track on the teen-marketed television show Beverly Hills 90210. The performance saw Aguilera in a bar performing at a birthday party for a character named David. During the 2014 US Open, the song was used whenever Eugenie Bouchard played on the court, Genie being her nickname. In the fifth season of New Girl, Jessica "Jess" Day (played by Zooey Deschanel) sings Schmidt (Max Greenfield) to sleep with the lyrics. Colleen Ballinger performed the song in the Haters Back Off episode "Staring in a Musicall". The song was used in the Off-Broadway adaptation of Cruel Intentions, acted out by Katie Stevens as Kathryn Merteuil. Darren Criss performed the song during his LM/DC Tour. In January 2018 Erika Jayne gave a rendition of "Genie in a Bottle" during the Aguilera-themed episode on Lip Sync Battle. Ewelina Lisowska covered the song in the Polish edition of an interactive talent show Your Face Sounds Familiar (2019). A slowed-down cover version of the song was used in the 2019 comedy-drama film Yes, God, Yes. A Spanish version of the song, titled "Genio Atrapado", was featured in the episode of the third season of Drag Race España, performed by Chanel Anorex and Kelly Roller. The song was mentioned in Prince Harry's 2023 memoir Spare, and was used in the 2024 film The Fall Guy, starring Ryan Gosling.

Jason Derulo sampled "Genie in a Bottle" in his 2019 song "Talk with Your Body". An interpolation from the track was included in Lali's and Taichu's single "S.O.S", as well. Kat DeLuna sampled the song in her 2007 track "Love Confusion". Likewise, it has been sampled by Ariana Grande, Miley Cyrus, and Camila Cabello. In 2024, Rag'n'Bone Man covered the song on BBC Radio 2's Piano Room.

== Other versions ==
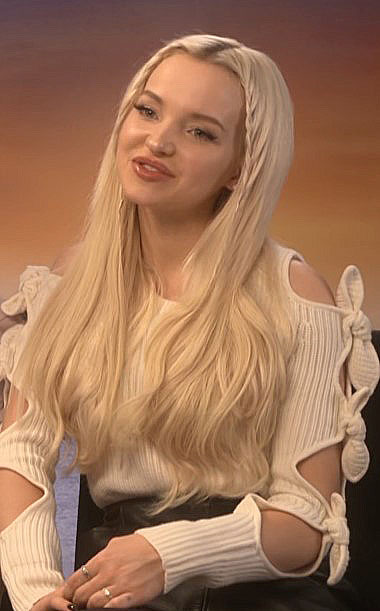
Dove Cameron (pictured) is noted for her cover of the song for the Disney Channel Descendants franchise in 2016.

In 2000, Aguilera recorded a Spanish version of "Genie in a Bottle" titled "Genio Atrapado" for her second studio album, Mi Reflejo. The song's lyrics were translated from English to Spanish by Cuban-American producer Rudy Pérez. "Genio Atrapado" peaked at number 13 on the Billboard Hot Latin Tracks chart. The song received a Latin Grammy Award nomination for Best Female Pop Vocal Performance at the Latin Grammy Awards of 2000, which was awarded to Shakira for "Ojos Así". A music video for the song was directed by Diane Martel, who also directed the visual for "Genie in a Bottle".

In the fall of 2001, an unauthorized mashup remix by The Freelance Hellraiser which combined Aguilera's a cappella vocals with the Strokes' 2001 song "Hard to Explain" was released under the title "A Stroke of Genius", receiving considerable attention and some airplay; The Guardian described the remix as having "defined the decade" as an early example of remix culture. Scottish band Speedway covered "A Stroke of Genius" (using the original title "Genie in a Bottle") and released it as their debut single as a double A-side with another song, "Save Yourself", on August 25, 2003. "Genie in a Bottle"/"Save Yourself" reached No. 10 on the UK Singles Chart. Alisa Mizuki released a Japanese-language cover of the song, titled "Love Potion", in 2002.

In 2008, Aguilera recorded a remake of "Genie in a Bottle" entitled "Genie 2.0" for her first greatest hits album, Keeps Gettin' Better: A Decade of Hits. "Genie 2.0" is an electropop-oriented song; a reviewer from Rolling Stone compared the song to works by Lady Gaga. The song was released via the iTunes Store in the United States to promote the album. Nick Butler of Sputnikmusic likened the song's style to that of The Eurythmics's "Sweet Dreams (Are Made of This)" and called it "awesome". To promote Keeps Gettin' Better, Aguilera performed "Genie 2.0" at the 2008 MTV Video Music Awards. The remake debuted at number 161 on the UK Singles Chart.

In 2016, Dove Cameron covered "Genie in a Bottle" with sanitized lyrics for the Disney Channel short series Descendants: Wicked World, accompanying it with a music video directed by Jay Martin. Cameron's version was received with praise with MTV writer Jessica Norton saying, "Not only does the revived cover satisfy our love of reliving the '90s, it also introduces a whole new generation to the iconic pop track." Cameron's cover peaked at number 11 on Billboard's Bubbling Under Hot 100. In September 2024, another cover of the song was released on EP titled The 25th Anniversary of Christina Aguilera (Spotify Anniversaries Live). It featured singer and guitarist Machine Gun Kelly.

In September 2025, Emilia released a cover of "Genio Atrapado" exclusively on Amazon Music. She described Aguilera as one of her musical influences and stated that she grew up singing and dancing to the song. In December 2025, the cover was released to all streaming platforms and later reached number 17 on the Monitor Latino Argentina National Songs airplay chart.

== Track listings ==
US CD and cassette single; UK cassette single

1. "Genie in a Bottle" – 3:36
2. "Blessed" – 3:06

German CD maxi single

1. "Genie in a Bottle" – 3:36
2. "We're a Miracle" – 4:09
3. "Don't Make Me Love You" – 4:15

UK CD maxi single 1

1. "Genie in a Bottle" – 3:36
2. "Blessed" – 3:06
3. "Genie in a Bottle" (Acapella Mix) – 4:16

UK CD maxi single 2 (limited edition)

1. "Genie in a Bottle" – 3:36
2. "Genie in a Bottle" (Eddie Arroyo Radio Club Mix) – 3:58
3. "Genie in a Bottle" (Enhanced Music Video)

European CD-maxi remix single

1. "Genie in a Bottle" (Eddie Arroyo Rhythm Mix) – 4:26
2. "Genie in a Bottle" (Riprock 'n' Alex G. Mix) – 3:50
3. "Genie in a Bottle" (Eddie Arroyo Radio Club Mix) – 3:58
4. "Genie in a Bottle" (Album version) – 3:36

== Personnel ==
Personnel are adapted from the CD liner notes.

- Songwriting – David Frank, Pam Sheyne, Steve Kipner
- Producing, arranging – David Frank, Steve Kipner
- Recording – David Frank, Steve Kipner
- Mixing – Dave Way
- Keyboards and drums – David Frank
- Additional keyboards – Steve Kipner
- Engineering – Paul Arnold, Ryan James Freeland

== Charts ==
=== Weekly charts ===
Chart (1999)	Peak position
Australia (ARIA)	2
Austria (Ö3 Austria Top 40)	1
Belgium (Ultratop 50 Flanders)	1
Belgium (Ultratop 50 Wallonia)	3
Canada (Nielsen SoundScan)	1
Canada CHR (Nielsen BDS)	1
Canada Top Singles (RPM)	2
Canada Adult Contemporary (RPM)	1
Canada Dance/Urban (RPM)	5
Croatia International (HRT) (Note: Only a partial archive of the Croatian chart is available so it is possible that the single had a higher peak.)	9
Denmark (Tracklisten)	1
Dominican Republic (Notimex)	2
El Salvador (Notimex)	2
Estonia (Eesti Top 20)	5
Europe (Eurochart Hot 100)	1
Finland (Suomen virallinen lista)	6
France (SNEP)	3
France Airplay (Music & Media)	1
Germany (GfK)	2
Greece (IFPI)	4
Hungary (MAHASZ)	5
Iceland (Íslenski Listinn Topp 40)	16
Ireland (IRMA)	2
Italy (FIMI)	2
Italy Airplay (Music & Media)	1
Latvia (Latvijas Top 40)	9
Netherlands (Dutch Top 40)	2
Netherlands (Single Top 100)	3
New Zealand (Recorded Music NZ)	2
Norway (VG-lista)	1
Poland Airplay (Music & Media)	12
Scottish Singles Sales (Official Charts)	4
Spain (Promusicae)	1
Sweden (Sverigetopplistan)	5
Switzerland (Schweizer Hitparade)	2
UK Singles (Official Charts)	1
US Billboard Hot 100	1
US Adult Pop Airplay (Billboard)	31
US Hot Latin Songs (Billboard) "Genio Atrapado"	13
US Latin Pop Airplay (Billboard) "Genio Atrapado"	13
US Pop Airplay (Billboard)	1
US Rhythmic Airplay (Billboard)	1
US Top 40 Tracks (Billboard)	1
US Tropical Airplay (Billboard) "Genio Atrapado"	7

=== Year-end charts ===
Chart (1999)	Position
Australia (ARIA)	10
Austria (Ö3 Austria Top 40)	9
Belgium (Ultratop 50 Flanders)	23
Belgium (Ultratop 50 Wallonia)	32
Brazil (Crowley)	37
Canada Top Singles (RPM)	12
Canada Adult Contemporary (RPM)	34
Canada Dance/Urban (RPM)	34
Europe (Eurochart Hot 100)	5
European Radio Top 100 (Music & Media)	11
France (SNEP)	29
Germany (Media Control)	7
Italy (Musica e dischi)	10
Netherlands (Dutch Top 40)	10
Netherlands (Single Top 100)	35
New Zealand (RIANZ)	3
Romania (Romanian Top 100)	11
Spain (AFYVE)	7
Sweden (Hitlistan)	39
Switzerland (Schweizer Hitparade)	10
Taiwan (Hito Radio)	37
UK Singles (OCC)	13
UK Airplay (Music Week)	24
US Billboard Hot 100	7
US Adult Top 40 (Billboard)	86
US Mainstream Top 40 (Billboard)	5
US Rhythmic Top 40 (Billboard)	5

Chart (2000)	Position
Taiwan (Hito Radio)	28

=== Decade-end charts ===
Chart (1990–1999)	Position
US Billboard Hot 100	43

=== All-time charts ===
Chart	Position
Poland (Radio Złote Przeboje)	3

=== Speedway version ===
Chart (2003)	Peak position
Scottish Singles Sales (Official Charts)	2
UK Singles (Official Charts)	10

=== Dove Cameron version ===
Chart (2017)	Peak position
US Bubbling Under Hot 100 (Billboard)	11

== Certifications ==
Region	Certification	Certified units/sales
Australia (ARIA)	Platinum	70,000^{^}
Austria (IFPI Austria)	Gold	25,000^{*}
Belgium (BRMA)	Platinum	50,000^{*}
Canada (Music Canada)	2× Platinum	160,000^{‡}
Denmark (IFPI Danmark)	Gold	45,000^{‡}
France (SNEP)	Gold	250,000^{*}
Germany (BVMI)	Platinum	500,000^{^}
Mexico (AMPROFON)	3× Platinum	180,000^{‡}
Mexico (AMPROFON) Spanish version	Gold	30,000^{‡}
New Zealand (RMNZ)	Platinum	10,000^{*}
New Zealand (RMNZ) digital	2× Platinum	60,000^{‡}
Spain (Promusicae)	Gold	30,000^{‡}
Sweden (GLF)	Platinum	30,000^{^}
Switzerland (IFPI Switzerland)	Gold	25,000^{^}
United Kingdom (BPI)	2× Platinum	1,200,000^{‡}
United States (RIAA)	3× Platinum	3,000,000^{‡}
^{*} Sales figures based on certification alone.^{^} Shipments figures based on certification alone.^{‡} Sales+streaming figures based on certification alone.

== Release history ==
Release dates and formats for "Genie in a Bottle"
Region	Date	Format(s)	Label(s)	Ref.
United States	May 11, 1999	Contemporary hit radio	RCA	
United States	May 24, 1999	Rhythmic contemporary radio	RCA	
United States	June 22, 1999	Cassette; CD	RCA	
Canada	June 29, 1999	CD	—	
Germany	August 9, 1999	Maxi CD	BMG	
Sweden	August 23, 1999	Maxi CD	RCA	
France	August 30, 1999	Maxi CD	BMG	
United Kingdom	October 4, 1999	Cassette; two maxi CDs	RCA	
France	October 12, 1999	CD	BMG	
France	November 9, 1999	12-inch vinyl	BMG	

== Bibliography ==
- Bronson, Fred (2003). The Billboard Book of Number 1 Hits. Billboard Books. ISBN 0-8230-7677-6.
- Dominguez, Pier (2003). Christina Aguilera: A Star is Made: The Unauthorized Biography. Amber Communications Group, Inc. ISBN 978-0-970-222-459.
