= The Justified & Stripped Tour =

2003 concert tour by Justin Timberlake and Christina Aguilera

- Tour by Justin Timberlake and Christina Aguilera
- Location: North America
- Associated albums: Justified; Stripped
- Start date: June 4, 2003
- End date: September 2, 2003
- No. of shows: 45
- Supporting act: Black Eyed Peas
- Attendance: 546,483
- Box office: $31.8 million ($55.66 million in 2025 dollars)
Justin Timberlake tour chronology
The Justified World Tour (2003–04)	The Justified & Stripped Tour (2003)	FutureSex/ LoveShow (2007)
Christina Aguilera tour chronology
Christina Aguilera in Concert (2000–01)	The Justified & Stripped Tour (2003)	The Stripped Tour (2003)

The Justified & Stripped Tour was a co-headlining concert tour by American singers Justin Timberlake and Christina Aguilera. It was launched in support of Timberlake's debut studio album, Justified (2002), and Aguilera's fourth studio album, Stripped (2002). Timberlake announced that he would go on a co-headlining tour at the 2003 American Music Awards on January 13, 2003, and it was officially announced the following day that Aguilera would be the co-headlined artist of the tour. Tour dates were revealed on February 21, 2003; it kicked off on June 4, 2003, in Phoenix, Arizona and visited 45 cities in North America. The Black Eyed Peas were serviced as the tour's supporting act.

The set list was composed generally from Timberlake's Justified and Aguilera's Stripped. However, both artists also added material from their early works, including Timberlake's work with NSYNC and Aguilera's self-titled debut album; she also performed two of Etta James's songs: "At Last" and "I Prefer You". The Justified and Stripped Tour was divided into five segments, two for Aguilera and three for Timberlake, with each segment being followed by an interlude to the next segment, and it ended with an encore, lasting for a total of 160 minutes.

The tour was met with mixed reviews from most contemporary music critics. Some praised the maturities of the two artists, while others criticized their vocal abilities during the tour. They also believed that Aguilera's image during the tour resembled that of American recording artist Cher, and her part concentrated too much on her vocal abilities, while Timberlake's part worked his considerable sex appeal. However, the tour was a commercial success, garnering more than US$30 million and becoming the fifth-highest-grossing tour in 2003. It also became the third-highest-grossing co-headlining tour of the year. In late 2003, the tour's extension, The Stripped Tour was held to promote Aguilera's Stripped without Timberlake's act. An extended play, entitled Justin & Christina, was released exclusively at Target Stores to support the tour.

== Development ==
When she was asked why they decided to go on tour together, Aguilera replied, "We both put out records around the same time that kind of introduced ourselves to the world as new artists, in a way. So it was just a good time. And I've known Justin since the Mickey Mouse Club days, since we were twelve or thirteen, so we go back in our friendship, and it kind of works."

== Concert synopsis ==
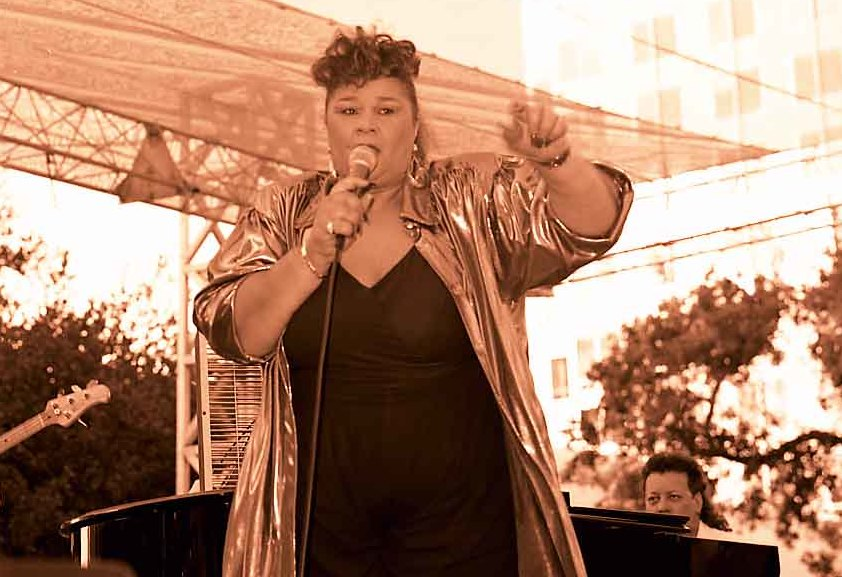
During the tour, Aguilera paid tribute to her idol Etta James by channeling her in a red silk dress and performing two of her songs, "At Last" and "I Prefer You".

The concert began with the video introduction "Stripped Intro", featuring Aguilera handcuffed, blindfolded, and sitting in a chair as the words "scandal", "gossip", and "lies" flashed across the screen. Backed by a five-piece band and eight back-up dancers, Aguilera strutted out singing "Dirrty" and "Get Mine, Get Yours", with curly black hair, a black and "hot-pink halter with belly-baring plunging neckline", pants and spiked heels. She performed "The Voice Within" as the follow-up, with a long black dress. During the acoustic version of "Come on Over Baby (All I Want Is You)", she gave a speech, "Thank you so much for coming ... I'm getting that feeling again and it's a blessing. Yes, I've grown up a little bit. Now I'm 22... I'm so happy you've grown with me". Aguilera went onstage again, performing the "Egyptian-turned-metal" version "Genie in a Bottle", where she rolled on a giant "X" which portrayed her then newly established alter ego "Xtina". Wearing "hot pink straps attached to her outfit", she slowly unraveled herself as the "genie" in the song, provocatively dancing her way out of the bottle. The performance of "Can't Hold Us Down" featured a pink "spark-shooting" motorcycle. Then, she belted out "Make Over" with the "rhythmic trot of a Spanish spaghetti Western", featuring "chain-link fence".

Following the video interlude of "Loving Me 4 Me", she performed the ballad "Impossible". She later changed into a "silky empire-waisted" red dress to channel her favorite singer, Etta James, and performed two of James' hits, "At Last" and "I Prefer You". The rendition of "Lady Marmalade" from the soundtrack Moulin Rouge! was described as "a playful romp" between four male dancers dressed as sailors and four female members of the troupe in lingerie. During the medley of two Spanish songs from Mi Reflejo, "Contigo en la Distancia" and "Falsas Esperanzas", a male dancer ripped off the skirt she wore, revealing tiny denim boy-cut shorts underneath. Later, she "saucily" replied, "Just because my album name is Stripped, doesn't mean you can take my clothes off". She continued with the "gorgeous ache" of "Walk Away". The performance of "Fighter" "had more feelings and excitements", and the performance version of "What a Girl Wants" was provided with some "well-deserved" dance moves, in which she wore a purple shirt and shorts. Aguilera ended her part with "Beautiful", wearing jeans and a T-shirt which was emblazoned with the words "God sees no color".

== Justin & Christina ==
Justin & Christina

EP by Justin Timberlake and Christina Aguilera
- Released: July 1, 2003
- Genres: Pop; electronic
- Labels: RCA; Jive; BMG

Justin Timberlake chronology
Justified (2002)	Justin & Christina (2003)	FutureSex/ LoveSounds (2006)

Christina Aguilera chronology
Stripped (2002)	Justin & Christina (2003)	Back to Basics (2006)

Justin & Christina is an extended play (EP) by Justin Timberlake and Christina Aguilera released on July 1, 2003, by RCA, Jive, and BMG Records. The EP was released exclusively at the American retail chain Target. Timberlake and Aguilera both contributed three songs to the six-track EP, which consists of one new original composition from each artist alongside remixes of previous singles from Aguilera's Stripped and Timberlake's Justified albums.

=== Track listing ===
Justin & Christina
No.	Title	Writer(s)	Performer	Length
1.	"That's What Love Can Do"	Glen Ballard; Christina Aguilera	Aguilera	3:44
2.	"Why, When, How"	Anthony Nance; Antonio Dixon; Justin Timberlake	Timberlake	4:01
3.	"Beautiful" (Valentin Club Mix)	Linda Perry	Aguilera	5:56
4.	"Rock Your Body" (Paul Oakenfold Mix)	Chad Hugo; Timberlake; Pharrell Williams	Timberlake	5:38
5.	"Fighter" (Hellraiser Remix)	Aguilera; Scott Storch	Aguilera	5:13
6.	"Cry Me a River" (Bill Hamel Justinough Vocal Mix)	Timberlake; Storch; Timothy Mosley	Timberlake	7:44
Total length:				32:16

== Reception ==
The Justified and Stripped Tour garnered mixed reviews from contemporary critics. Longtime critic Robert Hilburn for the Los Angeles Times called Aguilera's part "tedious" and her stage persona "uncertain", while praising Timberlake's act, considering him "born for the stage (with) the savvy instincts to put together a show that works. Rather than make himself the constant center of attention, he was comfortable enough at times simply to be part of a talented ensemble." By contrast, the Orange County Register's Ben Wener complimented Aguilera's performance, writing "I'd favor Aguilera's sex-appeal feast over Timberlake's club jam... Christina is simply a more well-rounded entertainer." Meanwhile, he criticized Timberlake's part and compared him to George Michael. Darryl Morder from The Hollywood Reporter was not impressed with either artist, naming the tour "more a case of egofied and cluttered." Morder further said that Aguilera's numbers were "too often swathed in bloated arrangements", while Timberlake's voice was "whiny and thin."

Multiple critics also believed that Aguilera's image during the tour resembled Cher's look during the 1980s. Christina Fuoco from MTV News drew similarities between the two artists: big curly black locks, a black and hot-pink halter with belly-baring plunging neckline, pants, and spiked heels. Writing for the San Francisco Chronicle, Neva Chonin also compared Aguilera to Cher, with "a torso-baring black ensemble, a shock of dark hair exploding from the back of her head". In 2003, the tour was the sixteenth-highest-grossing tour of the year, with a total gross of US$30,261,670. 546,483 tickets were sold out of 592,360 available (approximately 92%), including 23 sellout shows out of 45 (approximately 51%). It was also the third-top-grossing co-headlining tour of the year, only behind Face to Face by Billy Joel and Elton John, and Rocksimus Maximus by Aerosmith and Kiss.

== Accolades ==
Year	Ceremony	Category	Result	Ref.
2003	Pollstar Awards	Most Creative Tour Package	Nominated	
2003	Pollstar Awards	Most Creative Stage Production	Nominated	
2003	Teen Choice Awards	Teen Choice Award for Choice Music – Tour	Won	
2003	Teen People Choice Awards	Best Tour	Won	
2004	Rolling Stone Music Awards	Best Tour – Public's Choice	Won	

== Set lists ==
=== Christina Aguilera ===
1. "Stripped Intro" (Video Introduction)
2. "Dirrty"
3. "Get Mine, Get Yours"
4. "The Voice Within"
5. "Genie in a Bottle"
6. "Can't Hold Us Down"
7. "Make Over"
8. "Contigo en la Distancia" / "Falsas Esperanzas"
9. "Infatuation"
10. "Come On Over Baby (All I Want Is You)"
11. "Loving Me 4 Me" (Video Interlude)
12. "Impossible"
13. "At Last"
14. "I Prefer You"
15. "Lady Marmalade"
16. "Walk Away"
17. "Fighter"
18. "What a Girl Wants"

Encore

19. "Beautiful"

=== Justin Timberlake ===
1. "Ghetto Blaster" (contains elements of "Like I Love You", "Girlfriend" and "Rock Your Body") (Video Introduction)
2. "Rock Your Body"
3. "Right For Me"
4. "Gone" / "Girlfriend" / "Señorita"
5. "Still On My Brain"
6. "Nothin' Else"
7. "Tap Dance" (Dance Interlude)
8. "Cry Me a River"
9. "Let's Take A Ride"
10. "Beat Box" (Dance Interlude)
11. "Last Night"
12. "Take It From Here"

Encore

13. "Like I Love You"

== Shows ==
List of concerts, showing date, city, country, venue, opening acts, tickets sold, number of available tickets and gross revenue
Date (2003)	City	Country	Venue	Opening act	Attendance	Revenue
June 4	Phoenix	United States	America West Arena	The Black Eyed Peas	12,584 / 12,988	$672,922
June 6	Oakland	United States	The Arena in Oakland	The Black Eyed Peas	12,194 / 14,200	$699,827
June 8	Tacoma	United States	Tacoma Dome	The Black Eyed Peas	13,063 / 15,763	$657,736
June 10	Portland	United States	Rose Garden	The Black Eyed Peas	9,764 / 12,400	$494,872
June 13	Sacramento	United States	ARCO Arena	The Black Eyed Peas	10,653 / 12,200	$552,815
June 14	San Jose	United States	HP Pavilion	The Black Eyed Peas	13,934 / 13,934	$733,800
June 16	Los Angeles	United States	Staples Center	The Black Eyed Peas	44,188 / 44,589	$2,708,186
June 17	Los Angeles	United States	Staples Center	The Black Eyed Peas	44,188 / 44,589	$2,708,186
June 20	Los Angeles	United States	Staples Center	The Black Eyed Peas	44,188 / 44,589	$2,708,186
June 21	Las Vegas	United States	MGM Grand Garden Arena	The Black Eyed Peas	12,030 / 12,030	$1,036,214
June 23	Denver	United States	Pepsi Center	The Black Eyed Peas	10,838 / 12,428	$513,210
June 25	Oklahoma City	United States	Ford Center	The Black Eyed Peas	12,050 / 13,300	$633,787
June 26	Dallas	United States	American Airlines Center	The Black Eyed Peas	12,613 / 13,025	$717,161
June 28	San Antonio	United States	SBC Center	The Black Eyed Peas	11,002 / 12,800	$507,977
June 29	Houston	United States	Compaq Center	The Black Eyed Peas	10,980 / 11,347	$659,540
July 5	St. Louis	United States	Savvis Center	The Black Eyed Peas	12,304 / 12,304	$569,852
July 6	North Little Rock	United States	Alltel Arena	The Black Eyed Peas	7,669 / 10,100	$336,645
July 8	New Orleans	United States	New Orleans Arena	The Black Eyed Peas	11,139 / 11,139	$512,733
July 9	Bossier City	United States	CenturyTel Center	The Black Eyed Peas	10,646 / 10,646	$450,945
July 11	Memphis	United States	Pyramid Arena	The Black Eyed Peas	12,753 / 12,753	$448,175
July 12	Atlanta	United States	Philips Arena	The Black Eyed Peas	13,352 / 13,352	$784,320
July 14	Tampa	United States	St. Pete Times Forum	The Black Eyed Peas	12,679 / 12,679	$633,787
July 15	Orlando	United States	TD Waterhouse Centre	The Black Eyed Peas	—N/a	—N/a
July 16	Sunrise	United States	Office Depot Center	The Black Eyed Peas	11,831 / 11,831	$718,146
July 22	Rosemont	United States	Allstate Arena	The Black Eyed Peas	13,732 / 13,732	$822,466
July 23	Chicago	United States	United Center	The Black Eyed Peas	13,422 / 13,422	$846,143
July 25	Auburn Hills	United States	The Palace of Auburn Hills	The Black Eyed Peas	15,316 / 15,316	$897,043
July 26	Cincinnati	United States	US Bank Arena	The Black Eyed Peas	—N/a	—N/a
July 28	Pittsburgh	United States	Mellon Arena	The Black Eyed Peas	12,349 / 12,349	$639,450
July 29 (Note: The show on July 29, 2003, was originally scheduled to take place on August 3, 2003.)	Toronto	Canada	Air Canada Centre	The Black Eyed Peas	42,073 / 42,073	$3,938,460
July 31	Toronto	Canada	Air Canada Centre	The Black Eyed Peas	42,073 / 42,073	$3,938,460
August 1	Buffalo	United States	HSBC Arena	The Black Eyed Peas	10,964 / 10,964	$620,630
August 3	Columbus	United States	Value City Arena	The Black Eyed Peas	11,657 / 11,657	$642,398
August 5	Boston	United States	FleetCenter	The Black Eyed Peas	26,877 / 27,149	$1,694,442
August 6	Boston	United States	FleetCenter	The Black Eyed Peas	26,877 / 27,149	$1,694,442
August 8	Philadelphia	United States	First Union Center	The Black Eyed Peas	15,269 / 15,269	$1,004,555
August 18 (Note: The show on August 18, 2003, was originally scheduled to take place on August 16, 2003, but was postponed due to a lighting grid collapse.)	Uniondale	United States	Nassau Veterans Memorial Coliseum	The Black Eyed Peas	23,304 / 23,688	$1,464,069
August 19 (Note: The show on August 19, 2003, was originally scheduled to take place on August 17, 2003, but was postponed due to a lighting grid collapse.)	Uniondale	United States	Nassau Veterans Memorial Coliseum	The Black Eyed Peas	23,304 / 23,688	$1,464,069
August 20 (Note: The show on August 20, 2003, was originally scheduled to take place on August 13, 2003, but was postponed due to a lighting grid collapse.)	East Rutherford	United States	Continental Airlines Arena	The Black Eyed Peas	15,391 / 15,391	$913,208
August 22 (Note: The show on August 22, 2003, was originally scheduled to take place on August 14, 2003, but was postponed due to a lighting grid collapse.)	Hartford	United States	Hartford Civic Center	The Black Eyed Peas	10,848 / 11,884	$572,185
August 23 (Note: The show on August 23, 2003, was originally scheduled to take place on August 11, 2003, but was postponed due to a lighting grid collapse.)	Albany	United States	Pepsi Arena	The Black Eyed Peas	5,417 / 7,407	$345,235
August 25 (Note: The show on August 25, 2003, was originally scheduled to take place on August 19, 2003, but was postponed due to a lighting grid collapse.)	Washington, D.C.	United States	MCI Center	The Black Eyed Peas	12,921 / 12,921	$789,050
August 31 (Note: The show on August 31, 2003, was originally scheduled to take place on August 21, 2003, but was postponed due to a lighting grid collapse.)	Indianapolis	United States	Conseco Fieldhouse	The Black Eyed Peas	9,357 / 14,951	$480,706
September 1 (Note: The show on September 1, 2003, was originally scheduled to take place on August 23, 2003, but was postponed due to a lighting grid collapse.)	Milwaukee	United States	Bradley Center	The Black Eyed Peas	9,909 / 15,179	$572,185
September 2 (Note: The show on September 2, 2003, was originally scheduled to take place on August 24, 2003, but was postponed due to a lighting grid collapse.)	Saint Paul	United States	Xcel Energy Center	The Black Eyed Peas	12,016 / 12,016	$762,307
Total					539,088 / 571,176 (94.38%)	$32,047,182

== Canceled shows ==
List of canceled concerts, showing date, city, country, venue and reason for cancellation
Date (2003)	City	Country	Venue	Reason
June 11	Vancouver	Canada	Pacific Coliseum	Unable to cross the border
August 9	Atlantic City	United States	Boardwalk Hall	Lighting grid collapse

== See also ==
- List of Christina Aguilera concerts
- List of Christina Aguilera concert tours
