= List of Christina Aguilera concert tours =

Christina Aguilera concert tours
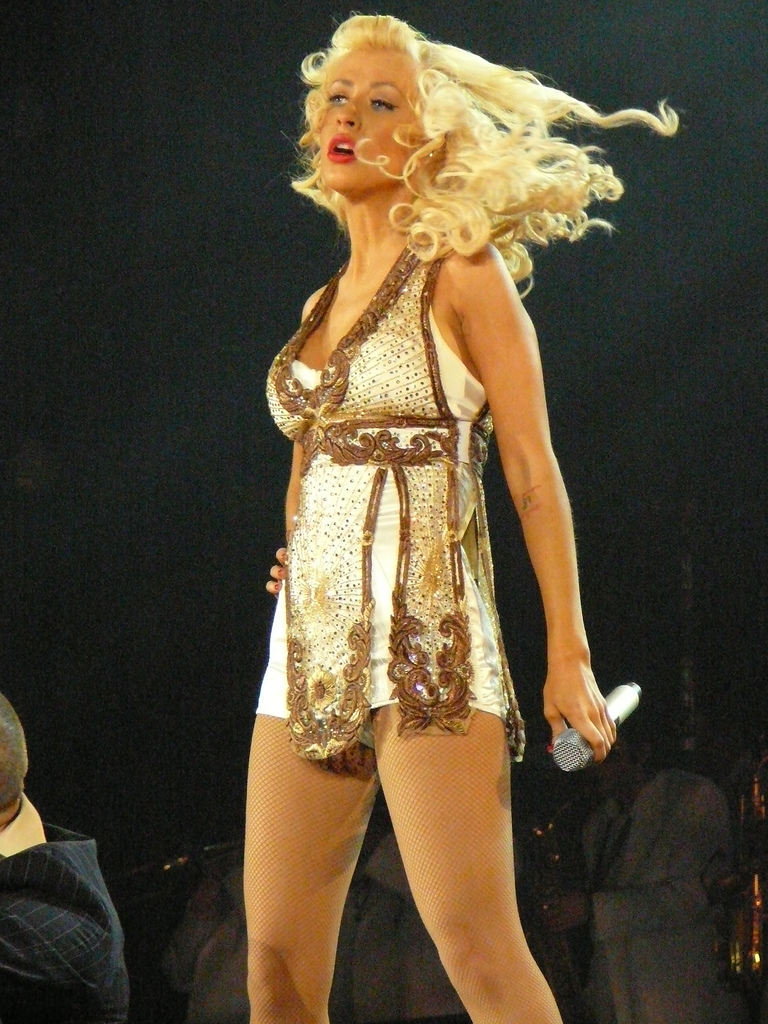
- Aguilera performing "Come On Over Baby" during the Back to Basics Tour
- Headlining: 5
- Co-headlining: 1

American singer Christina Aguilera has embarked on six concert tours, four of which have been worldwide. Her debut tour, Christina Aguilera in Concert was held in North America in 2000, and later it was extended to South America and Asia in 2001. During the promotion of her fourth studio album Stripped (2002) in 2003, Aguilera toured with Justin Timberlake in North America with The Justified & Stripped Tour in 45 dates. The tour was the 16th highest-grossing tour of the year. In late 2003, Aguilera continued to tour alone without Timberlakes' act in Europe, Japan and Australia. Aguilera was expected to return to North America in the summer of 2004, however, 29 dates were canceled due to Aguilera's vocal cord injuries. In 2006, Aguilera's fourth concert tour Back to Basics Tour was held in support of her fifth studio album Back to Basics (2006). The tour grossed over $75 million, with $48.1 million in 2007 alone, becoming the highest-grossing tour of the year by a female artist. In 2010, Aguilera planned to tour in the summer to promote her sixth studio album Bionic (2010), but her management team revealed that the tour was postponed due to Aguilera's promotion for her first feature film, Burlesque (2010). Aguilera reported that she would reschedule the tour in 2011, although these plans never materialized. In September 2018, Aguilera embarked on The Liberation Tour in promotion of her album Liberation, which was her first tour in a decade. In between the legs of her concert residency Christina Aguilera: The Xperience, Aguilera toured in Europe and Mexico with The X Tour. There were plans for her to headline a North American tour throughout 2020, with Adam Lambert as an opening act. These plans were ultimately cancelled due to the COVID-19 pandemic.

== Concert tours ==
=== Headlining ===
| Title | Dates | Associated album(s) | Location | Shows | Gross | Gross adj. in 2025 | Attendance | Ref. |
|---|---|---|---|---|---|---|---|---|
| Christina Aguilera in Concert | May 19, 2000– February 1, 2001 | Christina Aguilera; Mi Reflejo | North America; Europe; Latin America; Asia | 82 | $1,829,356 | $3,326,258 | 35,339 | |
| The Stripped Tour | September 22, 2003– December 17, 2003 | Stripped | Europe; Asia; Australia | 37 | —N/a | | | |
| Back to Basics Tour | November 17, 2006– October 24, 2008 | Back to Basics | Europe; North America; Asia; Australia | 82 | $48,173,773 | $74,800,394 | 907,568 | |
| The Liberation Tour | September 25, 2018– November 13, 2018 | Liberation | North America | 21 | $8,700,000 | $11,154,585 | 77,854 | |
| The X Tour | July 4, 2019– December 7, 2019 | Liberation | Europe; Latin America | 18 | $5,418,150 | $6,822,934 | 76,711 | |

=== Co-headlining ===
| Title | Other act(s) | Dates | Album(s) | Location | Shows | Gross | Gross adj. in 2025 | Attendance | Ref. |
|---|---|---|---|---|---|---|---|---|---|
| The Justified & Stripped Tour | Justin Timberlake | June 4, 2003– September 2, 2003 | Stripped; Justified | North America | 45 | $30,261,670 | $52,963,397 | 546,483 | |

== Cancelled tours ==
| Title | Dates | Associated album(s) | Location | Shows | Additional act(s) | Ref. |
|---|---|---|---|---|---|---|
| Stripped North American Tour | May 13, 2004– July 3, 2004 | Stripped | North America | 29 | Chingy (s.) | |
After touring around the world with The Stripped Tour which was an extension of The Justified & Stripped Tour at the end of 2003, Aguilera was expected to bring the show back to North America the following year. The Stripped Tour 2004 was expected to begin on May 13 with a new theme, lasting for 29 shows until July 3. The shows were cancelled shortly before the opening date due to Aguilera suffering a vocal cord injury.
| The Bionic Tour | July 15, 2010– August 19, 2010 | Bionic | North America | 20 | Leona Lewis (s.) | |
On May 10, 2010, Aguilera announced The Bionic Tour to promote her sixth studio album, Bionic. However, on May 25, Aguilera said she felt that she needed more time to focus on her first feature film Burlesque, thus cancelling the tour. Aguilera reported that the tour would be postponed until 2011, however it was never done.
| Unknown tour title | Summer 2020 | Unknown | North America | Unknown | Adam Lambert | |
On May 3, 2020, American singer Adam Lambert confirmed on Twitter that he was due to join Aguilera on a tour across North America during the summer of 2020. The tour had been planned, but before any announcements were made, the tour was suspended due to the COVID-19 pandemic. Though Lambert said that the tour was waiting to be rescheduled, it never happened.

== See also ==
- Christina Aguilera discography
- Christina Aguilera videography
- List of Christina Aguilera concerts
- List of songs recorded by Christina Aguilera
