= Stripped Live in the U.K. =

Video by Christina Aguilera
- Released: October 12, 2004; June 2008 (UK re-release)
- Recorded: Wembley Arena (London)
- Genres: Pop; R&B
- Length: 92 minutes
- Label: RCA
- Director: Julia Knowles
- Producers: Christina Aguilera; Sharon Ali

Christina Aguilera chronology
My Reflection (2001)	Stripped Live in the U.K. (2004)	Back to Basics: Live and Down Under (2008)

Stripped Live in the U.K. is the second concert DVD by Christina Aguilera, and documents the premiere UK performances of The Stripped Tour. The DVD does not include "Make Over" which was situated after "Can't Hold Us Down". An extended version of "What a Girl Wants" can be seen on television broadcast of the concert. The DVD premiered on WB Network at 9 PM on November 30, 2003.

== Critical reception ==
The DVD received mixed-to-positive reviews from music critics. UK reviewer, Peter Martin, praised the shows production, choreography and Aguilera's vocal ability, however was critical of Aguilera's tendency to oversing and the director's overall mixing. In a positive review, Mark Deming from The New York Times called the show "spectacular".

== Commercial performance ==
The DVD release reached top ten on record charts in most markets, including Belgium and Sweden. In Mexico, the DVD debuted at number seven on the AMPROFON Music DVD Chart, and in the United Kingdom it debuted at number six. In Australia, Stripped Live in the U.K. debuted at number four of the DVD chart and then fell to number six the following week. In the United States, the DVD peaked at number three on the Billboard Top Music Videos chart on October 30, 2004.

== Track listing ==
No.	Title	Writer(s)	Length
1.	"Stripped Intro [Part 1]"		1:45
2.	"Dirrty"	Christina Aguilera; Jasper Cameron; Balewa Muhammad	4:36
3.	"Get Mine, Get Yours"		5:06
4.	"The Voice Within"		5:03
5.	"Genie in a Bottle"		3:32
6.	"Can't Hold Us Down"		4:09
7.	"Contigo En La Distancia / Falsas Esperanzas"		4:53
8.	"Infatuation"		5:18
9.	"Come On Over Baby (All I Want Is You)"		5:03
10.	"Cruz"		4:01
11.	"Loving Me 4 Me (Interlude)"		0:53
12.	"Impossible"		3:51
13.	"At Last"		5:16
14.	"Lady Marmalade"		4:25
15.	"Walk Away"		5:07
16.	"Fighter"		4:19
17.	"Stripped Intro [Part 2]"		0:43
18.	"What a Girl Wants"		6:28
19.	"Beautiful"		5:54

=== Bonus features ===
- Exclusive interview with Aguilera about her album Stripped, the tour, and her life and causes outside of music
- An introduction to the supporting cast. Meet the musicians, dancers, stylists, and choreographers who help Aguilera put on her show every night
- "Gilbert's Bus Tour" — a tour of Aguilera's tour bus with backup dancer Gilbert Saldivar
- "One Night In Milano" — Aguilera meeting up with Donatella Versace in Milan, the fashion capital of the world
- "RSVP" — Aguilera answering questions directly from her fans
- "All Around The World" — backstage perspective of how the tour came to be

== Charts ==
Charts (2004)	Peak position
Argentine DVD Chart	13
Australian Music Videos Chart	4
Belgian DVD Chart (Flanders)	6
German DVD Chart	23
Greek DVD Chart	12
Japanese DVD Chart	81
Mexican DVD Chart	7
Swedish DVD Chart	7
UK DVD Chart	6
US Top Music Videos (Billboard)	3

== Certifications ==
Region	Certification	Certified units/sales
Australia (ARIA)	3× Platinum	45,000^{^}
Germany (BVMI)	Gold	25,000^{^}
United Kingdom (BPI)	Platinum	50,000^{*}
United States (RIAA)	Platinum	100,000^{^}
^{*} Sales figures based on certification alone.^{^} Shipments figures based on certification alone.

== Release history ==
Region	Date	Format	Catalogue no.	Label
United States	January 13, 2004	DVD	57873	RCA Records
Germany	November 15, 2004	DVD	82876580009	Sony BMG
