= Can't Hold Us Down =

2003 single by Christina Aguilera

Single by Christina Aguilera featuring Lil' Kim

from the album Stripped
- Released: July 8, 2003
- Recorded: 2002
- Studio: The Enterprise (Burbank, California); Conway (Hollywood, California)
- Genre: R&B; hip hop
- Length: 4:15 (album version); 3:43 (radio edit)
- Label: RCA
- Songwriters: Christina Aguilera; Kimberly Jones; Scott Storch; Matt Morris
- Producer: Scott Storch

Christina Aguilera singles chronology
| "Fighter" (2003) | "Can't Hold Us Down" (2003) | "The Voice Within" (2003) |

Lil' Kim singles chronology
| "Magic Stick" (2003) | "Can't Hold Us Down" (2003) | "Thug Luv" (2003) |

Music video
- "Can't Hold Us Down" on YouTube

"Can't Hold Us Down" is a song recorded by American singer Christina Aguilera and rapper Lil' Kim for the former's fourth studio album, Stripped (2002). It was released by RCA Records on July 8, 2003, as the fourth single from the album. The track was written and produced by Scott Storch, with additional songwriting by Aguilera and Matt Morris. An R&B and hip hop song with a dancehall outro, "Can't Hold Us Down" criticizes gender-related double standards.

"Can't Hold Us Down" received mixed reviews from music critics upon its release, although it was widely praised in retrospective commentary. It was nominated for the Grammy Award for Best Pop Collaboration with Vocals at the 2004 ceremony, but lost to "Whenever I Say Your Name" by Sting and Mary J. Blige. The single peaked at number 12 on the U.S. Billboard Hot 100 and charted within the top ten of record charts of several countries including Australia, Denmark, Ireland, and the United Kingdom. The song was included on the setlists of Aguilera's four major concert tours: Justified & Stripped Tour (2003), the Stripped Tour (2003), Back to Basics Tour (2006–08) and the Liberation Tour (2018).

A music video for "Can't Hold Us Down" was directed by David LaChapelle, inspired by the Lower East Side of New York City in the 1980s. The single has been widely recognized as a feminist anthem.

== Background and release ==
American singer Christina Aguilera rose to prominence with the successes of her first three studio albums Christina Aguilera (1999), Mi Reflejo (2000), and My Kind of Christmas (2000). However, she was dissatisfied with being marketed as what her then-manager Steve Kurtz desired rather than Aguilera's own wish. In late 2000, Aguilera hired Irving Azoff as her new manager and announced that her forthcoming album would have more musical and lyrical depth. She named the album Stripped, explaining that the term represented "a new beginning, a re-introduction of [herself] as a new artist". Hip hop producer Scott Storch wrote and produced several tracks for the album, including "Can't Hold Us Down". Additional writing credits for the song were provided by Aguilera and Matt Morris.

"Can't Hold Us Down" was serviced to mainstream radio and rhythmic stations in the United States as the fourth single from Stripped by RCA Records on July 8, 2003. The song was distributed as a CD single from September to October 2003 in the United Kingdom, Australia, Germany, and Italy by RCA Records and Sony Music Entertainment. A 12-inch edition of the song was released in the United States on September 9, 2003.

== Music and lyrics ==
"Can't Hold Us Down" (2003)
A 20-second sample of "Can't Hold Us Down", a hip hop and R&B song which criticizes "common" societal double standards

"Can't Hold Us Down" is written in the key of C Minor. Chuck Taylor from Billboard described it as a R&B track, while The New York Times's Kelefa Sanneh characterized it as a hip hop song. Todd Burns writing for Stylus Magazine also noted elements of dancehall towards the end of the track. Aguilera and Kim's vocals on the track, which Taylor described as "faux-R&B", span two octaves, from F_{3} to F_{5}.

"Can't Hold Us Down" lyrically discusses feminism; the song criticizes "common" gender-related double standards, in which men are applauded for their sexual behaviors, while women who behave in a similar fashion are disdained. In the book Therapeutic Uses of Rap and Hip-Hop, Susan Hadley and George Yancy discuss that "Can't Hold Us Down" is a hip hop song that "encourages young women to be proud, strong, and empowered to be all that they can be". At the song's first verse, Aguilera sings "Call me a bitch 'cause I speak what's on my mind / Guess it's easier for you to swallow if I sat and smiled"; she later rejects that all women "should be seen, not heard" and encourages them to "shout louder" during the chorus. Aguilera comments on the double standard with the lyrics "The guy gets all the glory the more he can score / While the girl can do the same and yet you call her a whore". Lil' Kim shares a similar sentiment during her verse in the bridge, questioning why a man is able to give a woman "some sex or sex her raw" while "if the girl do the same and then she's a whore".

Media outlets speculated that the lyrics of "Can't Hold Us Down" were directed towards rapper Eminem, who referred to Aguilera in his songs "Off the Wall" and "The Real Slim Shady". Spin magazine's Josh Kun wrote that Aguilera suggested Eminem "Must talk so big / To make up for smaller things". According to Kelefa Sanneh writing for The New York Times, Aguilera referred to Eminem in the lyrics "It's sad you only get your fame through controversy".

== Critical reception ==
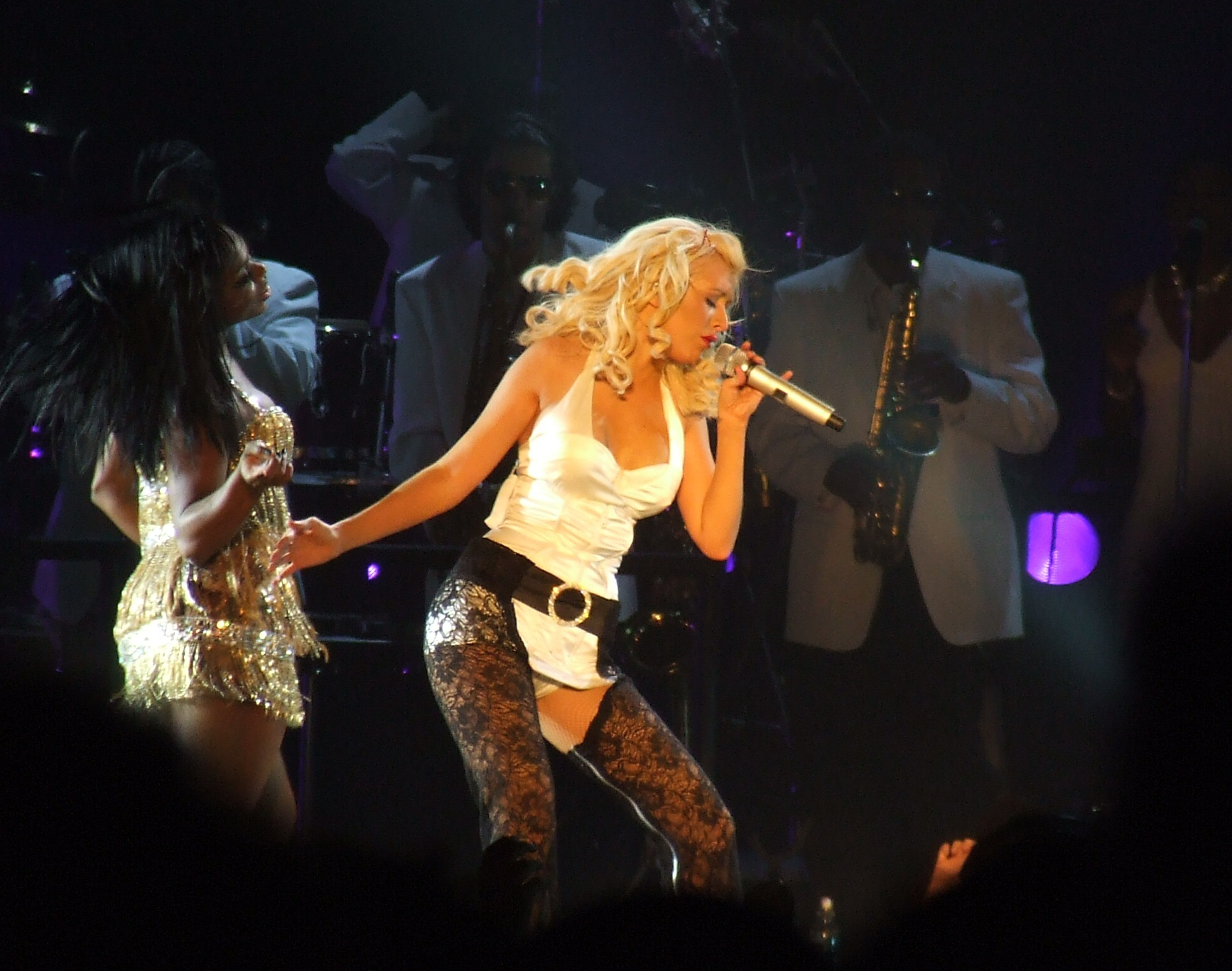
Aguilera performing excerpts from "Can't Hold Us Down" in a medley with "Still Dirrty" on the Back to Basics Tour in Dublin, November 2006

Upon its release, "Can't Hold Us Down" received mixed reviews from music critics. Rob O'Connor of Yahoo! Music praised the song, noting that it "perfectly encapsulates the earnest and strident young talent". While reviewing Stripped for The Guardian, Betty Clarke opined that the song rewrites the rules of feminism, using a hip-hop beat to do so. Chuck Taylor from Billboard criticized the song as a "real waste of time and talent", while Rolling Stone's Jancee Dunn called the track "curiously lifeless". Stylus Magazine's Todd Burns was critical of the song's "bland" lyrics yet appreciated the dancehall elements that emerged at the end of the track. Josh Kun of Spin praised the lyrics for being more confrontational than the works of her contemporary Britney Spears. Jacqueline Hodges writing for BBC Music appreciated Lil's Kim's inclusion on the track for adding "a bit of edge". "Can't Hold Us Down" was nominated for Best Pop Collaboration with Vocals at the 2004 Grammy Awards, but lost to "Whenever I Say Your Name" by Sting and Mary J. Blige. On reviewing Aguilera's greatest hits album, Keeps Gettin' Better: A Decade of Hits in 2008, Nick Levine from Digital Spy shared disappointment because the song could not make it to the compilation.

The song has been recognized as a feminist anthem. Nicholas Ransbottom from The Charleston Gazette placed the song on his list of the top ten songs of female empowerment in 2013, calling it a "great anthem about women sticking up for themselves in a misogynistic world". Several writers for The A.V. Club included the track on their list of seventeen "well-intended yet misguided feminist anthems" in 2010; they agreed that the song itself was "actually one of her better songs", although they felt that its accompanying music video overshadowed its lyrical "[confrontation of] the double standard of female sexuality" since Aguilera conducted herself in a provocative fashion that conflicted its intended meaning. Yasamin Saeidi from Burton Mail listed "Can't Hold Us Down" on her list of the "top ten empowering lady anthems" in 2013. According to Julianne Shepherd of Portland Mercury "Can't Hold Us Down" is a "valuable and important moment for feminist pop music". Since then, the single has been placed on similar rankings of feminist songs for Marie Claire, Nylon, and Pride.com.

== Commercial performance ==
"Can't Hold Us Down" peaked at number 12 on the US Billboard Hot 100 and number 3 on the Pop Songs chart. The song peaked at number 4 on the Canadian Singles Chart. In Australia, "Can't Hold Us Down" reached a peak position of number 5 on the Australian Singles Chart, and was certified gold by the Australian Recording Industry Association for shipments of 35,000 copies in the country. Additionally, it reached number 2 on the New Zealand Singles Chart. It peaked at number 4 on the Hungarian Singles Chart, number 5 on the Irish Singles Chart, and number 6 on the UK Singles Chart. On May 4, 2020, it was certified silver by the British Phonographic Industry for shipments of 200,000 copies in the UK. The single charted at numbers 7 and 15 on the Belgian Flanders and Walloon Singles Charts, respectively. On the Danish Singles Chart, "Can't Hold Us Down" peaked at number 8, while its highest position on the German Media Control GfK chart was number 9.

== Music video ==
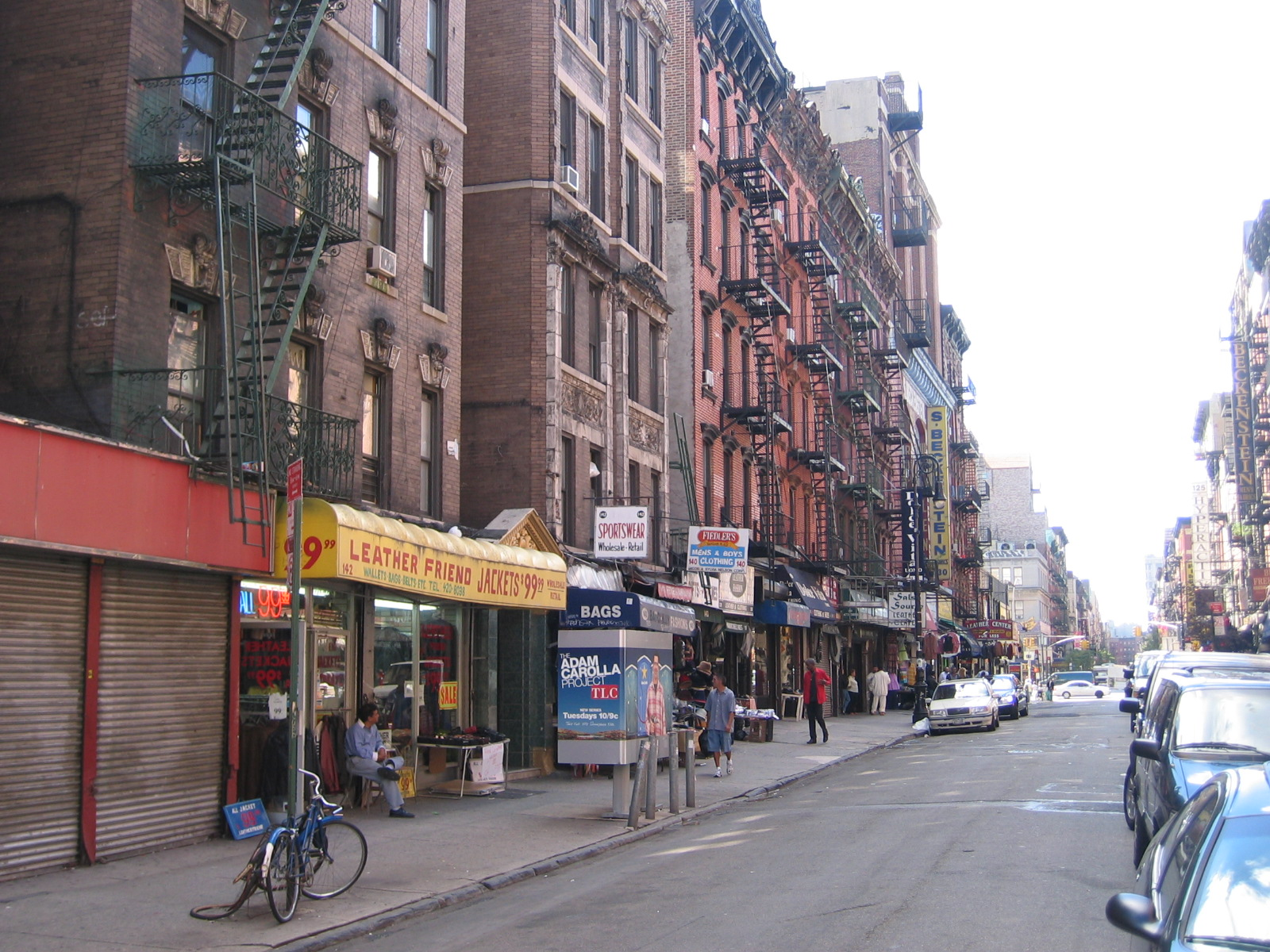
The music video for the song was inspired by Lower East Side, Manhattan, in the 1980s.

The music video for "Can't Hold Us Down" was directed by David LaChapelle, who previously directed the music video for Stripped's lead single "Dirrty" in 2002. It was filmed in a Los Angeles soundstage that depicted a 1980s Lower East Side neighborhood in Manhattan, New York City. LaChapelle described the concept of the video as his "ode to the '80s". In the video, Aguilera wears a pink midriff shirt matching a sleeveless sports jacket and pair of shorts, a purple baseball cap embroidered with the words "Lady C", and white long socks. She is seen with dyed black hair and gold earrings.

As the video starts with Aguilera is chatting with a group of women. When Aguilera leaves the conversation, a man suddenly grabs her butt, making Aguilera stop and causing an argument between them. As she continues to sing, the nearby women in the neighborhood join her, while the male dancers are joined and form their respective sides in the street. They performed their own hip hop dance skills against each other. At the bridge, Lil' Kim appears in a bikini and a mesh black coat, and dances in her high heels. The argument ends with Aguilera spraying the men with a water hose, which she holds between her legs and parodies the penis.

=== Reception ===
Jason Heller from The A.V. Club criticized LaChappelle for "[swallowing] the message" of the track by following an unrelated concept in the clip. In the book Music Video and the Politics of Representation, Diane Railton and Paul Watson felt that the video exemplified cultural appropriation, specifically noting how Aguilera conducted herself as an African-American woman, and elaborated that it emphasized "a range of issues concerning the representation of gender and race". Andy Cohn from The Fader provided a more favorable review, and opined that Aguilera's "sass" helped to highlight her mixed Irish-Ecuadorian background.

The music video for "Can't Hold Us Down" has received scholarly attention as an example of cultural appropriation. Murali Balaji, author of the article "Vixen Resistin': Redefining black womanhood in hip-hop music videos" published in the Journal of Black Studies, noted that "blackness and sexuality" has become characteristics by which African-American women are able to self-define. Consequently, he opined that the inclusion of Lil' Kim in the clip represented an element of "'primitive' sexuality", which Aguilera intended to imitate through her own behavior in the video. In their article "Naughty girls and red-blooded women: Representations of female heterosexuality in music video", published in Feminist Media Studies, Diane Railton and Paul Watson made specific note of the conflicting message raised by the lyrics "all my girls around the world", while "blackness and whiteness are clearly inscribed on and through the bodies of Aguilera and Kim." They suggested that this example detracted the message of the track by emphasizing the problem that "female heterosexuality" is confined to "the very limited range of ways" in mainstream culture, in this instance "gender and race [and] sexual behaviour".

In March 2019, Brazilian singer Anitta paid tribute to Aguilera's attire from the "Can't Hold Us Down" music video, wearing an almost identical outfit.

== Live performances ==
Though Lil' Kim and Christina have not performed the song together, Aguilera performed "Can't Hold Us Down" on her Justified & Stripped Tour, which was held in support of Aguilera's Stripped and Justin Timberlake's album Justified (2002). In late 2003, the track was included on the setlist of the Stripped Tour, which acted as the Justified and Stripped Tour's extension and happened without Timberlake's acts. The performance in London was included on the singer's first full-length DVD Stripped Live in the U.K. (2004). On her Back to Basics Tour (2006–08), Aguilera performed excerpts of "Can't Hold Us Down" in a medley with "Still Dirrty".

In July 2021, Aguilera performed the song for two nights at the Hollywood Bowl with Gustavo Dudamel and the Los Angeles Philharmonic. She also sang excerpts from the song during the 47th People's Choice Awards, and later made "Can't Hold Us Down" part of her setlist at the EuroPride concert in Malta in September 2023.

== Track listings ==
- CD single
1. "Can't Hold Us Down" – 4:15
2. "Can't Hold Us Down" (Sharp Boys Orange Vocal Remix) – 7:22
3. "Can't Hold Us Down" (Jacknife Lee Remix) – 4:30
- 12-inch single
1. "Can't Hold Us Down" (album version) – 4:15
2. "Can't Hold Us Down" (instrumental) – 4:29
3. "Can't Hold Us Down" (a capella) – 4:25
- DVD single
1. "Can't Hold Us Down" (video) – 4:15
2. "Can't Hold Us Down" (album version) – 4:15
3. "Beautiful" (Brother Brown Divine Remix) – 9:07
4. "Impossible" (Performance Snippet) – 1:00
5. "Get Mine, Get Yours" (Performance Snippet) – 1:00

== Credits and personnel ==
Credits adapted from "Can't Hold Us Down" CD liner notes

Studios

- Mixed at the Record Plant (Los Angeles)
- Recorded at the Enterprise Studios (Burbank, California and Conway Studios (Hollywood, California)

Personnel

- Writing – Christina Aguilera, Scott Storch, Matt Morris
- Producing – Scott Storch
- Vocals arranging – Christina Aguilera
- Vocals producing – Christina Aguilera, E. Dawk
- Mixing – Tony Maserati

- Assistant mixing – Anthony Kilhoffer

- Recording – Wassim Zreik, Oscar Ramirez
- Assistant Engineering – Aaron Leply, John Morichai, Kevin Szymanski, Scott Whitting
- Drums – Kameron Houff
- Background vocals – Crystal Drummer. Charlean Hines, Erica King, Robinson, Toya Smith
- Lil' Kim appear courtesy of Queen Bee/Atlantic Recording Corporation

== Charts ==
=== Weekly charts ===
Weekly chart performance for "Can't Hold Us Down"
| Chart (2003–2004) | Peak position |
|---|---|
| Australia (ARIA) | 5 |
| Australian Urban (ARIA) | 2 |
| Austria (Ö3 Austria Top 40) | 13 |
| Belgium (Ultratop 50 Flanders) | 7 |
| Belgium (Ultratop 50 Wallonia) | 15 |
| Denmark (Tracklisten) | 8 |
| Europe (Eurochart Hot 100) | 9 |
| France (SNEP) | 27 |
| Germany (GfK) | 9 |
| Germany (Deutsche Black Charts) | 10 |
| Hungary (Single Top 40) | 4 |
| Iceland (Íslenski Listinn Topp 20) | 2 |
| Ireland (IRMA) | 5 |
| Italy (FIMI) | 20 |
| Netherlands (Dutch Top 40) | 10 |
| Netherlands (Single Top 100) | 14 |
| New Zealand (Recorded Music NZ) | 2 |
| Norway (VG-lista) | 14 |
| Poland (Polish Airplay Charts) | 27 |
| Romania (Romanian Top 100) | 13 |
| Scottish Singles Sales (Official Charts) | 7 |
| Sweden (Sverigetopplistan) | 12 |
| Switzerland (Schweizer Hitparade) | 11 |
| UK Singles (Official Charts) | 6 |
| UK Hip Hop/R&B (Official Charts) | 3 |
| US Billboard Hot 100 | 12 |
| US Pop Airplay (Billboard) | 3 |
| US Rhythmic Airplay (Billboard) | 14 |
| US Top 40 Tracks (Billboard) | 4 |

=== Year-end charts ===
Year-end chart performance for "Can't Hold Us Down"
| Chart (2003) | Position |
|---|---|
| Australia (ARIA) | 95 |
| Belgium (Ultratop 50 Flanders) | 59 |
| Ireland (IRMA) | 37 |
| Germany (Media Control GfK) | 66 |
| Germany (Deutsche Black Charts) | 70 |
| Netherlands (Dutch Top 40) | 71 |
| Netherlands (Single Top 100) | 94 |
| New Zealand (RIANZ) | 29 |
| Sweden (Hitlistan) | 99 |
| Switzerland (Schweizer Hitparade) | 44 |
| UK Singles (OCC) | 108 |
| US Billboard Hot 100 | 67 |
| US Mainstream Top 40 (Billboard) | 19 |
| US Rhythmic Top 40 (Billboard) | 62 |

== Certifications ==
Certifications and sales for "Can't Hold Us Down"
| Region | Certification | Certified units/sales |
|---|---|---|
| Australia (ARIA) | Gold | 35,000^{^} |
| New Zealand (RMNZ) | Gold | 7,500^{*} |
| United Kingdom (BPI) | Silver | 200,000^{‡} |
^{*} Sales figures based on certification alone.^{^} Shipments figures based on certification alone.^{‡} Sales+streaming figures based on certification alone.

== Release history ==
Release dates and formats for "Can't Hold Us Down"
| Region | Date | Format(s) | Label(s) | Ref. |
|---|---|---|---|---|
| United States | July 8, 2003 | Contemporary hit radio; rhythmic contemporary radio | RCA | |
| United Kingdom | September 8, 2003 | Cassette; maxi CD; DVD | RCA | |
| United States | September 9, 2003 | 12-inch vinyl | RCA | |
| Australia | September 15, 2003 | Maxi CD | BMG | |
| France | September 16, 2003 | Maxi CD | BMG | |
| Sweden | September 17, 2003 | Maxi CD | RCA | |
| Germany | September 22, 2003 | Maxi CD | BMG | |
| Italy | September 30, 2003 | Maxi CD | BMG | |
| France | October 7, 2003 | CD | BMG | |

== Bibliography ==
- Hadley, Susan; Yancy, George (2012). Therapeutic Uses of Rap and Hip-Hop. Routledge. p. 94. ISBN 9781136652332.
- Balaji, Murali (2008). "Vixen Resistin': Redefining black womanhood in hip-hop music videos". Journal of Black Studies. 41 (1): 5–20. doi:10.1177/0021934708325377. PMID 21117275. S2CID 26320847.
- Besigiroha, Linda (2010). "Independent women? Feminist discourse in music videos". In Gymnich, Marion; Ruhl, Kathrin; Scheunemann, Klaus (eds.). Gendered (Re)Visions: Constructions of Gender in Audiovisual Media. Göttingen, Germany: Bonn University Press (Vandenhoeck & Ruprecht). pp. 227–252. ISBN 9783899716627.
- Railton, Diane; Watson, Paul (2005). "Naughty girls and red-blooded women: Representations of female heterosexuality in music video". Feminist Media Studies. 5 (1): 51–63. doi:10.1080/14680770500058207. S2CID 144307744.
- Railton, Diane; Watson, Paul (2011). Music Video and the Politics of Representation. Edinburgh University Press. pp. 88–90. ISBN 9780748633234.
