= The Stripped Tour =

2003 concert tour by Christina Aguilera

- Transcontinental tour by Christina Aguilera
- Location: Europe; Asia; Oceania
- Associated album: Stripped
- Start date: September 22, 2003
- End date: December 17, 2003
- Legs: 3
- No. of shows: 27 in Europe; 3 in Asia; 7 in Oceania; 37 in total
- Supporting acts: So Solid Crew; Black Eyed Peas

Christina Aguilera concert chronology
- The Justified & Stripped Tour (2003); The Stripped Tour (2003); Back to Basics Tour (2006–08)

The Stripped Tour, also known as Stripped World Tour and Stripped... Live, (Note: Several names have been used for the tour. Frontier, the tour promoter that promoted the Australian leg of the tour refers to it as The Stripped Tour, while other sources call it Stripped World Tour. The title on the tour's poster, as well as some publications, is Stripped... Live.) was the third concert tour and second world tour by American singer Christina Aguilera. The tour was launched in support of her fourth studio album, Stripped (2002), beginning on September 22, 2003, at the Color Line Arena in Hamburg, Germany, and concluded on December 17, 2003, at the Rod Laver Arena in Melbourne, Australia. The tour visited cities in Europe, Asia and Australia throughout a total of 37 concerts. The Stripped Tour was the second tour in support of Stripped. The album was promoted across North America through The Justified & Stripped Tour which was co-headlined with Justin Timberlake. The tour concluded in September 2003. Aguilera extended her part of the show and continued the tour without Timberlake, taking the show to other territories.

The tour was scheduled to return for another 29 dates in North America in May 2004, but it was ultimately cancelled due to Aguilera suffering a vocal cord injury in early 2004. The performances at the Wembley Arena in London were taped and broadcast in November 2003 under the name Stripped Live in the U.K.. It was later released as a video album in October 2004.

== Background ==
Despite achieving success with her early work, Aguilera was unsatisfied with the material and image created for her. Aguilera took creative control of the creation of her fourth studio album, adopting a more sexual image and an alter ego named Xtina. Stripped was released in October 2002. After promoting the album through several promotional appearances, Aguilera scheduled a North American co-headlining tour with Justin Timberlake, whom she knew from The All-New Mickey Mouse Club. The tour was held in support of Stripped and Timberlake's debut album, Justified, which were released around the same time. The tour visited North America throughout summer 2003. The tour concluded on September 2, 2003. Aguilera scheduled an additional 37 international tour dates without Timberlake. Black Eyed Peas returned as the opening act for the U.K. and Ireland shows, and So Solid Crew took the spot for the rest of the European shows.

== Concert synopsis ==
The Stripped Tour's synopsis is quite similar to Aguilera's part during The Justified & Stripped Tour in 2003. The tour began with the video introduction of "Stripped Intro", featuring Aguilera handcuffed, blindfolded and sitting in a chair as the words "scandal", "gossip" and "lies" flashed across the screen. Then, the curtain dropped, she strutted out singing "Dirrty" and "Get Mine, Get Yours", with big curly black locks, a black and hot-pink halter with belly-baring plunging neckline, pants and spiked heels. She performed "The Voice Within" as the follow-up, with a long black dress. The acoustic version of "Come On Over Baby (All I Want Is You)" sounded "like a seasoned veteran of decades". During the performance, she gave a speech, "Thank you so much for coming... I'm getting that feeling again and it's a blessing. Yes, I've grown up a little bit. Now I'm 22... I'm so happy you've grown with me". Aguilera took off the stage again, performing the "Egyptian-turned-metal" version "Genie in a Bottle", where she rolled on a giant "X" which portrayed her then newly established alter ego "Xtina". Wearing "hot pink straps attached to her outfit", she slowly unraveled herself as the "genie" in the song, provocatively danced her way out of the bottle.

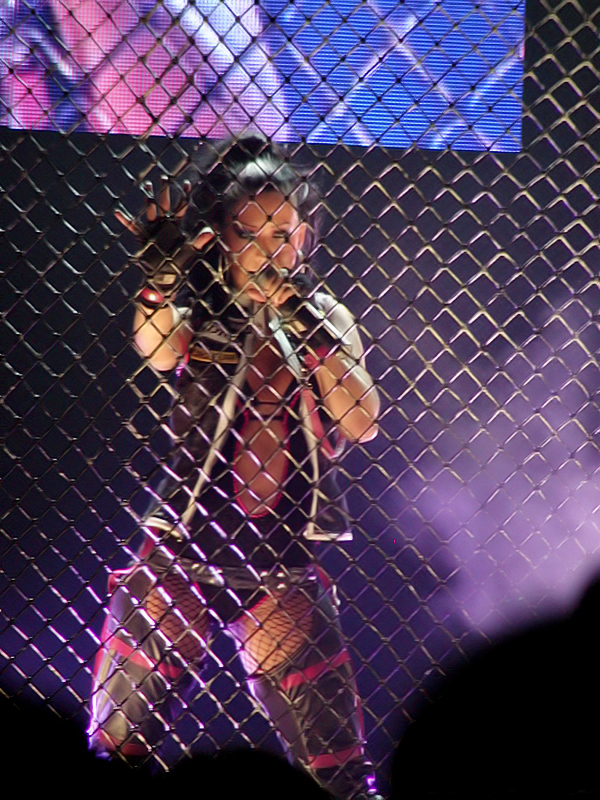
Aguilera performs her dance-rock and salsa-inspired song "Make Over"

The performance of "Can't Hold Us Down" featured a pink "spark-shooting" motorcycle, with girls dancing around and against boys who tried to poke them. Then, she belted out "Make Over", a "lush", midtempo pop rock song with the "rhythmic trot of a Spanish spaghetti Western", featuring "chain-link fence". During the medley of two Spanish songs from Mi Reflejo, "Contigo en la Distancia" and "Falsas Esperanzas", a male dancer ripped off the skirt she wore, revealing tiny denim boy-cut shorts underneath. Later, she "saucily" replied, "Just because my album is called Stripped, doesn't mean you can take my clothes off".

Following the video interlude of "Loving Me 4 Me", she performed the ballad "Impossible". She changed into a "silky empire-waisted" red dress to channel her favorite singer, Etta James, and performed James' two hits, "At Last" and "I Prefer You". The rendition of "Lady Marmalade" from the soundtrack Moulin Rouge! was described as "a playful romp" between four male dancers dressed as sailors and four female members of the troupe in lingerie. She continued with the "gorgeous ache" of her own waltz ballad, "Walk Away". The performance of "Fighter" had more feelings and excitements, though the sound mix was lacking, and the performance version of "What a Girl Wants" was provided with some well-deserved dance moves, in which she dressed a purple shirt and shorts. Aguilera ended her part with "Beautiful", wearing jeans and a T-shirt which emblazoned with the words "God sees no color".

Additionally, DMX's song "X Gon' Give It to Ya" was used as a transition between "What a Girl Wants" and the encore but it was cut out from the Stripped Live in the U.K. video album. This part was aired, however, on TV.

== Broadcasts and recordings ==
The shows at the Wembley Arena in London were filmed and put together into a video recording of the show. Titled Stripped Live in the U.K., it premiered on the WB Network at 9 PM on November 30, 2003. The video was later released on DVD format on October 12, 2004.

== Set list ==
The following set list was obtained from the September 24, 2003 concert, held at the Forum Copenhagen in Copenhagen, Denmark. It does not represent all concerts during the tour.

1. "Stripped (Intro)" (video introduction)
2. "Dirrty"
3. "Get Mine, Get Yours"
4. "The Voice Within"
5. "Genie in a Bottle"
6. "Make Over"
7. "Contigo en la Distancia"
8. "Infatuation"
9. "Come On Over Baby (All I Want Is You)"
10. "Cruz"
11. "Impossible"
12. "At Last" / "I Prefer You"
13. "Lady Marmalade"
14. "Walk Away"
15. "Fighter"
16. "What a Girl Wants"
17. "Beautiful"

== Shows ==
Date (2003)	City	Country	Venue
Europe
September 22	Hamburg	Germany	Color Line Arena
September 24	Copenhagen	Denmark	Forum Copenhagen
September 26	Stockholm	Sweden	Hovet
September 27	Oslo	Norway	Oslo Spektrum
September 29	Berlin	Germany	Arena Berlin
September 30	Dresden	Germany	Messehalle
October 3	Rotterdam	Netherlands	Rotterdam Ahoy
October 4	Cologne	Germany	Kölnarena
October 6	Stuttgart	Germany	Hanns-Martin-Schleyer-Halle
October 7	Antwerp	Belgium	Sportpaleis
October 9	Paris	France	Zénith de Paris
October 14	Munich	Germany	Olympiahalle
October 15	Vienna	Austria	Wiener Stadthalle
October 17	Frankfurt	Germany	Festhalle Frankfurt
October 18	Zürich	Switzerland	Hallenstadion
October 20	Milan	Italy	Mazda Palace
October 22	Barcelona	Spain	Palau Sant Jordi
October 25	Birmingham	England	NEC Arena
October 27	Manchester	England	Manchester Evening News Arena
October 28	Glasgow	Scotland	SECC Concert Hall 4
October 30	Belfast	Northern Ireland	Odyssey Arena
October 31	Dublin	Ireland	Point Theatre
November 2	London	England	Wembley Arena
November 3	London	England	Wembley Arena
November 5	London	England	Wembley Arena
November 7	Birmingham	England	NEC Arena
November 8	Sheffield	England	Hallam FM Arena
Asia
December 1	Tokyo	Japan	Tokyo International Forum
December 2	Tokyo	Japan	Tokyo International Forum
December 3	Tokyo	Japan	Tokyo International Forum
Oceania
December 8	Sydney	Australia	Sydney Entertainment Centre
December 9	Sydney	Australia	Sydney Entertainment Centre
December 11	Melbourne	Australia	Rod Laver Arena
December 12	Melbourne	Australia	Rod Laver Arena
December 14	Brisbane	Australia	Entertainment Centre
December 16	Adelaide	Australia	Entertainment Centre
December 17	Melbourne	Australia	Rod Laver Arena

=== Attendance data ===
Venue	City	Country	Attendance
Palau Sant Jordi	Barcelona	Spain	6,000
Wembley Arena	London	England	(100%)

== Cancelled shows ==
List of cancelled concerts, showing date, city, country, venue and reason for cancellation
Date (2003)	City	Country	Venue	Reason
November 10	Newcastle	England	Telewest Arena	Acute bronchitis
November 11	Manchester	England	Manchester Evening News Arena	Acute bronchitis

== North American tour cancellation ==
The Stripped Tour
- Tour by Christina Aguilera
- Location: North America
- Associated album: Stripped
- Start date: May 13, 2004
- End date: July 3, 2004
- No. of shows: 29
- Supporting act: Chingy

Christina Aguilera concert chronology
- The Justified & Stripped Tour (2003); The Stripped Tour (2004); Back to Basics Tour (2006–08)

The success of the tour lead to a series of dates being scheduled in North America. The show was expected to be revised and have a new theme for a summer tour in 2004. The tour was expected to begin on May 13, 2004, in Auburn, Washington, and to conclude on July 3, 2004, with American rapper Chingy joining her for 29 dates. Tickets went on sale on March 13, 2004. In April 2004, Aguilera was told by doctors to remain on vocal rest for six week after she suffered a vocal cord injury, leading to all 29 concerts getting cancelled one month prior to the tour's beginning. She expressed disappointment in having to cancel the tour, and it was announced that refunds would be processed. However, service company FansRule had filed for Chapter 11 bankruptcy protection, and had no ability to refund the money to buyers. Aguilera's team then hired legal representation to deal with the designated trustees for FansRule, Joe Baldiga and John Aquino, and the bankruptcy court to help the fans. According to Baldiga, $320,000 was due as repayment to the hundreds of Aguilera fans who had bought VIP tickets. Aguilera's publicists said in a statement:

You should know that Christina has arranged through her attorneys to ensure that consumers would be receiving the maximum return possible, by virtue of the fact that Christina has agreed that any amounts due to her and her company should instead be used to satisfy the claims of the many fans who purchased tickets through FansRule.

Fans would finally be able to get refunds two years after the cancellation.

=== Shows ===
List of cancelled 2004 concerts, showing date, city, country, venue and reason for cancellation
Date (2004)	City	Country	Venue	Reason
May 13	Auburn	United States	White River Amphitheatre	Vocal cord injury
May 14	Vancouver	Canada	Pacific Coliseum	Vocal cord injury
May 16	Ridgefield	United States	Sunlight Supply Amphitheater	Vocal cord injury
May 18	Mountain View	United States	Shoreline Amphitheater	Vocal cord injury
May 19	Irvine	United States	Verizon Wireless Amphitheater	Vocal cord injury
May 21	Las Vegas	United States	Aladdin Theatre for Performing Arts	Vocal cord injury
May 22	Chula Vista	United States	Sleep Train Amphitheater	Vocal cord injury
May 24	Phoenix	United States	Ak-Chin Pavilion	Vocal cord injury
May 25	Albuquerque	United States	Isleta Amphitheater	Vocal cord injury
May 27	Selma	United States	Verizon Wireless Amphitheater	Vocal cord injury
May 29	Dallas	United States	Gexa Energy Pavilion	Vocal cord injury
May 30	The Woodlands	United States	Cynthia Woods Mitchell Pavilion	Vocal cord injury
June 2	Atlanta	United States	Lakewood Amphitheater	Vocal cord injury
June 4	Tampa	United States	St. Pete Times Forum	Vocal cord injury
June 5	West Palm Beach	United States	Perfect Vodka Amphitheater	Vocal cord injury
June 13	Wantagh	United States	Nikon at Jones Beach Theater	Vocal cord injury
June 15	Bristow	United States	Nissan Pavilion	Vocal cord injury
June 16	Holmdel Township	United States	PNC Bank Arts Center	Vocal cord injury
June 18	Mansfield	United States	Tweeter Center for the Performing Arts	Vocal cord injury
June 19	Camden	United States	BB&T Pavilion	Vocal cord injury
June 21	Toronto	Canada	Molson Canadian Amphitheatre	Vocal cord injury
June 23	Hershey	United States	Hersheypark Stadium	Vocal cord injury
June 25	Burgettstown	United States	First Niagara Pavilion	Vocal cord injury
June 26	Atlantic City	United States	Borgata Event Center	Vocal cord injury
June 28	Cleveland	United States	Quicken Loans Arena	Vocal cord injury
June 29 (Note: The show on June 29 in Milwaukee was a part of "Summerfest".)	Milwaukee	United States	Marcus Amphitheater	Vocal cord injury
July 1	Minneapolis	United States	Target Center	Vocal cord injury
July 2	Tinley Park	United States	Hollywood Casino Amphitheater	Vocal cord injury
July 3	Clarkston	United States	DTE Energy Music Theater	Vocal cord injury

== See also ==
- List of Christina Aguilera concerts
- List of Christina Aguilera concert tours
