= Si No Te Hubiera Conocido =

2000 song by Christina Aguilera and Luis Fonsi

Song by Christina Aguilera and Luis Fonsi

from the album Mi Reflejo
- Language: Spanish
- Released: September 12, 2000
- Recorded: 2000
- Genre: Latin ballad
- Length: 4:26
- Label: RCA
- Songwriter: Rudy Pérez
- Producer: Rudy Pérez

Licensed audio
- "Si No Te Hubiera Conocido" on YouTube

"Si No Te Hubiera Conocido" (English: "If I Hadn't Known You") is a song by American recording artist Christina Aguilera and Puerto Rican singer Luis Fonsi. It was written and produced by Rudy Pérez for Aguilera's second studio album Mi Reflejo (2000). The song portrays two lovers who remember each other and cannot imagine their lives if they had not known each other.

"Si No Te Hubiera Conocido" received mixed reviews from music critics for its ballad production. Although the song was not released as a single, the song peaked at number 36 on the Billboard Hot Latin Songs chart in the United States of America. The song also peaked at number 3 on the Notimex charts in Panama and number 22 on the US Latin Pop Airplay charts.

The song is currently the only non-single song from the album to chart and Fonsi's only non-single to chart, and the two artists would later collaborate with each other (alongside other notable artists) on the charity single "El Ultimo Adios (The Last Goodbye)", released on the 20th of September, 2001 to commemorate the September 11 attacks. The charity single would be their final collaboration as of 2025.

== Background and composition ==
"Si No Te Hubiera Conocido"
"Si No Te Hubiera Cononcido" is a ballad performed by Christina Aguilera and features Luis Fonsi as a guest artist.

According to her manager Steve Kurtz, Aguilera expressed interest in recording a Spanish-language album before she recorded her debut studio album Christina Aguilera. Producer Rudy Pérez was approached during the recording sessions of the album and produced a number of tracks, including "Si No Te Hubiera Conocido", which he wrote.

"Si No Te Hubiera Conocido" is a Latin ballad featuring Puerto Rican singer Luis Fonsi. Aguilera wanted Fonsi to perform a duet with her because she felt that she could relate to him as they "grew up listening to the same things". "I was taken with his vocal ability, talent, and charm", she said. The ballad tells the story of two happy lovers that cannot envision their lives if they had not met each other.

== Critical and commercial reception ==
On the review of album, an editor for Billboard magazine wrote that "listener will enjoy while listening to" the song. David Browne, writing for Entertainment Weekly provided an ironic review, commenting that Fonsi has "a nice voice, but he didn't get in [her] way." Orlando Sentinel editor Perry Gettelman was not impressed along with "El Beso del Final" and "Pero Me Acuerdo de Ti", writing that "She seems equally fond of acrobatic trills and low, sex-kittenish moans" which Parry referred to them as "ballands". Kurt B. Reighley Wall of Sound called "Si No Te Hubiera Conocido" a "sweet, syrupy duet" and stated that it "starts out charming enough but eventually devolves into the International Shouting Contest." In the United States, "Si No Te Hubiera Conoci" peaked at number 36 on the Billboard Hot Latin Songs and 22 on the Latin Pop Songs charts.

== Charts ==
| Chart (2001) | Peak position |
|---|---|
| Panama (Notimex) | 3 |
| US Hot Latin Songs (Billboard) | 36 |
| US Latin Pop Airplay (Billboard) | 22 |
