= Christina Aguilera in Concert =

2000–01 concert tour by Christina Aguilera

- Transcontinental tour by Christina Aguilera
- Location: Asia; Europe; North America; South America
- Associated albums: Christina Aguilera; Mi Reflejo (2001 shows)
- Start date: May 19, 2000
- End date: February 1, 2001
- Legs: 6
- No. of shows: 82
- Attendance: 35,339
- Box office: $1,829,356 (2 shows)

Christina Aguilera concert chronology
- Christina Aguilera in Concert (2000–2001); The Justified & Stripped Tour (2003)

Christina Aguilera in Concert was the debut concert tour by American singer Christina Aguilera. It supported her two studio albums, Christina Aguilera (1999) and Mi Reflejo (2000). Beginning in May 2000 with appearances at radio festivals in the United States, the tour continued into Canada. Here, Aguilera headlined Psyko Blast, a pop music tour created by Canadian network, YTV. The singer returned to the US performing at state and county fairs before headlining shows in amphitheatres and arenas. The tour continued into 2001, visiting Mexico, Puerto Rico, Panama, Venezuela and Japan. Sponsors of the tour included Sears, Levi's, J-Wave and Pioneer.

== Background ==
On April 27, 2000, it was announced that Christina Aguilera would start her first headlining concert tour in order to support her two studio albums, Christina Aguilera (1999) and Mi Reflejo (2000). According to MTV News, her tour was being co-sponsored by Sears and Levi's and would hit 35 cities.

== Critical reception ==
Emily Flynn from Traverse City Record-Eagle wrote that Aguilera gave an amazing show at the National Cherry Festival. She continues, "As the sun dipped its way behind the horizon, sparkling eyes filled with amazement lit up the night sky. Whether a genie or not, Aguilera was out of the bottle Wednesday night, granting everyone's wish for an unforgettable concert". Errol Nazareth from Toronto Sun, gave the singer's show at the Air Canada Centre four out of five stars. He writes, "And it's during ballads like 'I Turn To You' and 'Reflection' that her voice really shone. It's big, soulful and boasts an impressive range. But, while Aguilera says she'd rather let her music speak for itself, you can't help but draw parallels to Whitney Houston and Mariah Carey".

Pat St. Germain from Winnipeg Sun thought Aguilera's voice was the star of the show. He goes on to write, "The diminutive 19-year-old singer with the big R&B voice kept the energy at maximum level as she rolled right into 'Somebody's Somebody', prowling the stage with six backup dancers and bringing most of the crowd to its feet". For the concert at Edmonton's Skyreach Centre. Mike Ross from Edmonton Sun said that the singer proved to be on a higher level than Spears. He says, "Aguilera proved to be no ordinary pop tart. In both material and vocals, she's superior to her best friend/rival Britney Spears, even if she doesn't draw the same numbers. Isn't that the way it always is"?

The concert at the Missouri State Fair was applauded by Kevin C. Johnson from St. Louis Post-Dispatch. He comments, "Her big moment to break out came with her pull-out-all-stops cover of Etta James' "At Last"—a song she's been working to death the last several months in her attempt to prove her capabilities". The praise continued for the show at the Douglas County Fair. Kim Roberts from Omaha World-Herald states, "Her incredible range and powerful voice is surprising from one so petite, and her moves, as well as those of her dancers, captivated the audience".

Brad Cawn from Chicago Tribune writes the singer's show at the famed United Center was not what he was expecting. He continues, "Her long tresses came straight out of Madonna's Blond Ambition World Tour; her song-ending vocal riffing right from Mariah Carey's sky-high multi-octave schtick; and the starkly modern stage was more 'N Sync than Nickelodeon. Playing to both sides of her image, she left her belly button exposed, and flirted conservatively—if there is such a thing—with the vague sexuality of the music penned for her". Ed Masley from Pittsburgh Post-Gazette states Aguilera charmed her hometown crowd at the Post-Gazette Pavilion, giving the audience a "live" show. He goes on to say "As she proved repeatedly last night, she has the voice to be a major force in R&B for years to come. But this could be her only chance to be the second biggest female artist of her generation with the lunchbox set".

Roger Moore from The Orlando Sentinel comments that Aguilera proved to be "real" for her concert at the TD Waterhouse Centre—in comparison to Spears (who performed at the same venue two weeks before Aguilera). He says, "Of course, it's like comparing Gouda with Cheez Whiz. Britney was all over-choreographed, pre-packaged, and tape-recorded. Christina, on the other hand, is the real deal. Real stage banter. Real stage presence. Heck, real singing. What a relief to hear a bubble-gummer with real pipes tear into her tunes, letting six back-up dancers do the heavy lifting and leaving the tape recording to NBC's Olympics coverage".

== Broadcasts and recordings ==
While headlining Psykoblast Tour in Canada, the final concert in Vancouver premiered on August 2, 2000. Called, "Christina: Live from Vancouver", the concert special aired on CTV and YTV. Selections from the concert were available online on "Click2Music". In London, her performance at Party in the Park aired on T4 Lived. In 2001, her concert at the NHK Hall in Tokyo aired on MTV Japan on February 9, 2001. The concert was streamed live on the day of the concert via Aguilera's "Click2Music" website.

== Opening acts ==
- Destiny's Child (North America, select dates)
- soulDecision (North America, select dates)
- Sygnature (North America, select dates)
- McMaster & James (Canada)
- Alecia Elliott (Sioux Falls, Traverse City)
- The Moffats (Toronto, Winnipeg, Edmonton)
- Mytown (Ottawa, Calgary, Vancouver)
- Before Dark (Bonner Springs, Des Moines, Springfield)
- Faze 4 (Milwaukee, Chicago)
- Christian Davis (Seattle, Concord)
- Brownskin (Honolulu)
- DisGuyz (Honolulu)
- Jyve V (San Juan)
- Son Miserables (Panama City)

== Setlist ==
The following setlist was obtained from the concert held on October 19, 2000; at the KeyArena in Seattle, Washington. It does not represent all concerts for the duration of the tour.

1. "Genie in a Bottle"
2. "Somebody's Somebody"
3. "So Emotional"
4. "Ven Conmigo (Solamente Tú)"
5. "I Turn to You"
6. "When You Put Your Hands On Me"
7. "Contigo en la Distancia"
8. "All Right Now"
9. "Love For All Seasons"
10. "At Last"
11. "Come On Over Baby (All I Want Is You)" (contains elements of "Got to Be Real")

Encore

12. "What a Girl Wants"

== Tour dates ==
List of 2000 concerts
Date	City	Country	Venue
May 19, 2000^{[A]}	Holland	United States	Holland Municipal Stadium
May 20, 2000	Council Bluffs	United States	Westfair Amphitheater
May 28, 2000^{[B]}	Charlotte	United States	American Legion Memorial Stadium
June 2, 2000^{[C]}	Uniondale	United States	Nassau Coliseum
June 3, 2000^{[D]}	Mansfield	United States	Tweeter Center for the Performing Arts
June 4, 2000^{[E]}	Camden	United States	Blockbuster-Sony Music Entertainment Centre
July 1, 2000^{[F]}	Milwaukee	United States	Marcus Amphitheater
July 2, 2000^{[G]}	Sioux Falls	United States	W. H. Lyon Fairgrounds
July 4, 2000	Merrillville	United States	Star Plaza Theatre
July 5, 2000^{[H]}	Traverse City	United States	Traverse Bay Casino Resort Music Stage
July 7, 2000^{[I]}	Toronto	Canada	Air Canada Centre
July 9, 2000^{[J]}	London	England	Hyde Park
July 10, 2000^{[I]}	Ottawa	Canada	Corel Centre
July 13, 2000^{[I]}	Winnipeg	Canada	Winnipeg Arena
July 14, 2000^{[I]}	Saskatoon	Canada	Saskatchewan Place
July 16, 2000^{[I]}	Edmonton	Canada	Skyreach Centre
July 17, 2000^{[I]}	Calgary	Canada	Canadian Airlines Saddledome
July 19, 2000^{[I]}	Vancouver	Canada	General Motors Place
July 26, 2000^{[K]}	Paso Robles	United States	Main Arena Grandstand
July 28, 2000^{[L]}	Billings	United States	MetraPark Arena
July 29, 2000^{[M]}	Minot	United States	All Seasons Arena
July 31, 2000	Bonner Springs	United States	Sandstone Amphitheater
August 1, 2000	Maryland Heights	United States	Riverport Amphitheatre
August 3, 2000^{[N]}	Kearney	United States	Buffalo County Fairgrounds
August 4, 2000^{[O]}	Omaha	United States	Ak-Sar-Ben Coliseum
August 7, 2000	Nashville	United States	AmSouth Amphitheatre
August 10, 2000^{[P]}	Des Moines	United States	Iowa State Fair Grandstand
August 11, 2000^{[Q]}	Springfield	United States	Illinois State Fair Grandstand
August 13, 2000^{[R]}	Sedalia	United States	Missouri State Fairgrounds
August 14, 2000^{[S]}	Columbus	United States	Celeste Center
August 15, 2000^{[T]}	Midland	United States	Midland County Fairgrounds
August 18, 2000^{[U]}	Louisville	United States	Freedom Hall
August 19, 2000	Chicago	United States	United Center
August 21, 2000	Cincinnati	United States	Riverbend Music Center
August 23, 2000	Cleveland	United States	Gund Arena
August 24, 2000	Clarkston	United States	Pine Knob Music Theatre
August 26, 2000	Burgettstown	United States	Post-Gazette Pavilion
August 28, 2000^{[V]}	Falcon Heights	United States	Minnesota State Fair Grandstand
August 30, 2000	Darien	United States	Darien Lake Performing Arts Center
August 31, 2000^{[W]}	Essex Junction	United States	Coca-Cola Grandstand
September 1, 2000	Hartford	United States	Meadows Music Theatre
September 6, 2000	Holmdel	United States	PNC Bank Arts Center
September 8, 2000	Wantagh	United States	Jones Beach Theater
September 9, 2000	Mansfield	United States	Tweeter Center for the Performing Arts
September 15, 2000	Camden	United States	Blockbuster-Sony Music Entertainment Centre
September 16, 2000	Columbia	United States	Merriweather Post Pavilion
September 18, 2000	Charlotte	United States	Blockbuster Pavilion
September 19, 2000	Noblesville	United States	Deer Creek Music Center
September 20, 2000	Atlanta	United States	Coca-Cola Lakewood Amphitheatre
September 22, 2000	Orlando	United States	TD Waterhouse Centre
September 23, 2000	Tampa	United States	Ice Palace
September 25, 2000	West Palm Beach	United States	Mars Music Amphitheatre
September 27, 2000	New Orleans	United States	UNO Lakefront Arena
September 28, 2000	The Woodlands	United States	Cynthia Woods Mitchell Pavilion
September 30, 2000^{[X]}	Dallas	United States	Fair Park Bandshell
October 3, 2000	Salt Lake City	United States	Delta Center
October 4, 2000^{[Y]}	Las Vegas	United States	Mandalay Bay Events Center
October 5, 2000	Denver	United States	Magness Arena
October 8, 2000	Phoenix	United States	America West Arena
October 10, 2000	Chula Vista	United States	Coors Amphitheatre
October 11, 2000	Los Angeles	United States	Universal Amphitheatre
October 12, 2000	Los Angeles	United States	Universal Amphitheatre
October 14, 2000	Wheatland	United States	Sacramento Valley Amphitheatre
October 15, 2000	Concord	United States	Chronicle Pavilion
October 18, 2000	Portland	United States	Rose Garden
October 19, 2000	Seattle	United States	KeyArena
October 21, 2000	Honolulu	United States	Stan Sheriff Center
December 9, 2000^{[Z]}	Baltimore	United States	Baltimore Arena
December 10, 2000^{[AA]}	Uniondale	United States	Nassau Coliseum
December 11, 2000^{[AB]}	Providence	United States	Providence Civic Center
December 13, 2000^{[AC]}	Rochester	United States	Blue Cross Arena
December 16, 2000^{[AD]}	Los Angeles	United States	Shrine Auditorium
December 17, 2000^{[AE]}	Columbus	United States	Nationwide Arena
December 19, 2000^{[AF]}	New York City	United States	Madison Square Garden

List of 2001 concerts
Date	City	Country	Venue
January 14, 2001	San Juan	Puerto Rico	Roberto Clemente Coliseum
January 16, 2001	Mexico City	Mexico	Auditorio Nacional
January 17, 2001	Mexico City	Mexico	Auditorio Nacional
January 20, 2001^{[AG]}	Caracas	Venezuela	Estadio Olímpico de la UCV
January 22, 2001	Panama City	Panama	Estadio Nacional de Béisbol
January 30, 2001	Osaka	Japan	Kōsei Nenkin Kaikan
January 31, 2001	Tokyo	Japan	NHK Hall
February 1, 2001	Tokyo	Japan	Shibuya Public Hall

Festivals and other miscellaneous performances

^{A} This concert was a part of the "Tulip Time Festival"
^{B} This concert was a part of KISS 95.1's "Kiss Music Mania"
^{C} This concert was a part of "Zootopia"
^{D} This concert was a part of Kiss 108's "Kiss Concert"
^{E} This concert was a part of Q 102's "Q Concert"
^{F} This concert was a part of "Summerfest"
^{G} This concert was a part of the "Sioux Empire Fair"
^{H} This concert was a part of the "National Cherry Festival"
^{I} These concerts were a part of YTV "Pysko Blast"
^{J} This concert was a part of "Party in the Park"
^{K} This concert was a part of the "California Mid-State Fair"
^{L} This concert was a part of "MontanaFair"
^{M} This concert was a part of the "North Dakota State Fair"
^{N} This concert was a part of the "Buffalo County Fair"
^{O} This concert was a part of the "Douglas County Fair"
^{P} This concert was a part of the "Iowa State Fair"
^{Q} This concert was a part of the "Illinois State Fair"
^{R} This concert was a part of the "Missouri State Fair"
^{S} This concert was a part of the "Ohio State Fair"
^{T} This concert was a part of the "Midland County Fair"
^{U} This concert was a part of the "Kentucky State Fair"
^{V} This concert was a part of the "Minnesota State Fair"
^{W} This concert was a part of the "Champlain Valley Fair"
^{X} This concert was a part of the "State Fair of Texas"
^{Y} This concert was a part of "Tiger Jam III"
^{Z} This concert was a part of WXYV-FM's "Holiday Blast"
^{AA} This concert was a part of WBLI's "Winter Jam"
^{AB} This concert was a part of 92 PRO-FM's "Jingle Mingle"
^{AC} This concert was a part of 98PXY's "Jingle Jam"
^{AD} This concert was a part of KIIS-FM's "Holiday Jingle Ball"
^{AE} This concert was a part of WNCI's "Jingle Ball"
^{AF} This concert was a part of WKTU's "Miracle on 34th Street"
^{AG} This concert was a part of the "Caracas Pop Festival"

Cancellations and rescheduled shows

July 8, 2000	Montreal, Canada	Molson Centre	Cancelled
August 6, 2000	Noblesville, Indiana	Deer Creek Music Center	Rescheduled to September 19, 2000
August 16, 2000	Columbus, Ohio	Celeste Center	Rescheduled to August 14, 2000
September 3, 2000	Geddes, New York	Molson Grandstand	Cancelled. This concert was a part of the Great New York State Fair.
September 4, 2000	Saratoga Springs, New York	Saratoga Performing Arts Center	Cancelled
September 9, 2000	Mansfield, Massachusetts	Tweeter Center for the Performing Arts	Cancelled
September 11, 2000	Virginia Beach, Virginia	GTE Virginia Beach Amphitheater	Cancelled
September 19, 2000	Raleigh, North Carolina	Alltel Pavilion	Cancelled
September 27, 2000	New Orleans, Louisiana	New Orleans Arena	Moved to the UNO Lakefront Arena
September 28, 2000	Dallas, Texas	Reunion Arena	Rescheduled to 30 September 2000 and moved to the Fair Park Bandshell.
October 2, 2000	Greenwood Village, Colorado	Fiddler's Green Amphitheatre	Rescheduled to October 5, 2000, and moved to the Magness Arena in Denver, Colorado.
October 6, 2000	Portland, Oregon	Portland Memorial Coliseum	Rescheduled to October 18, 2000, and moved to Rose Garden
October 8, 2000	Mountain View, California	Shoreline Amphitheatre	Rescheduled to October 15, 2000, and moved to the Chronicle Pavilion in Concord, California.
October 10, 2000	Wheatland, California	Sacramento Valley Amphitheatre	Rescheduled to October 14, 2000
October 11, 2000	Irvine, California	Verizon Wireless Amphitheatre	Moved to the Universal Amphitheatre
October 13, 2000	Chula Vista, California	Coors Amphitheatre	Rescheduled to October 10, 2000
October 14, 2000	Anaheim, California	Arrowhead Pond of Anaheim	Cancelled
October 15, 2000	Phoenix, Arizona	America West Arena	Rescheduled to October 8, 2000
October 27, 2000	Rosemont, Illinois	Allstate Arena	Cancelled. This concert was a part of the B96 Boo Bash.

=== Box office score data ===
Venue	City	Tickets sold / Available	Gross revenue
Madison Square Garden	New York City	17,778 / 18,743 (95%)	$1,380,480
Auditorio Nacional	Mexico City	17,561 / 18,734 (94%)	$448,876
TOTAL (for the 2 concerts listed)		35,339 / 37,477 (94%)	$1,829,356

== Personnel ==
- Music Director: Alex Alessandroni
- Drums: Brian Frasier-Moore
- Keyboards: Ezequiel "Cheche" Alara and Alex Alessandroni
- Guitar: Rafael Moreira
- Bass: Reggie Hamilton
- DJ: Adam 12
- Backing Vocalists: Diane Gordon and Yvinn Patrick
- Dancers: Nancy Anderson, Tiffani Manabat, Buddy Mynatt, Angel Ramos, Jorge Santos and Rob Vinson

== See also ==
- List of Christina Aguilera concerts
- List of Christina Aguilera concert tours
