= Falsas Esperanzas =

2001 single by Christina Aguilera

Single by Christina Aguilera

from the album Mi Reflejo
- Released: April 9, 2001
- Genre: Latin; tropical
- Length: 2:57
- Label: RCA
- Songwriter: Jorge Luis Piloto
- Producer: Rudy Pérez

Christina Aguilera singles chronology
"Lady Marmalade" (2001)	"Falsas Esperanzas" (2001)	"Dirrty" (2002)

Music video
- "Falsas Esperanzas" on YouTube

"Falsas Esperanzas" (English: "False Hopes") is a song recorded by American singer Christina Aguilera for her second studio album Mi Reflejo (2000). Written by Jorge Luis Piloto, the uptempo Latin record was produced by Rudy Pérez and features instrumentation from a horn. It was released as the third and final single from Mi Reflejo on April 9, 2001, by RCA Records.

"Falsas Esperanzas" received generally positive reviews from music critics, with some naming it a stand-out track from the album. Most journalists praised Aguilera's vocals on "Falsas Esperanzas". The single peaked at number 15 in Spain, and reached the top-ten in Mexico and Venezuela. Aguilera performed "Falsas Esperanzas" at the 43rd Annual Grammy Awards (2001) and during her Justified and Stripped Tour (2003), The Stripped Tour (2003), and The X Tour (2019).

== Background ==
According to her manager Steve Kurtz, Aguilera expressed interest in recording a Spanish-language album before she recorded her debut studio album Christina Aguilera (1999). Producer Rudy Pérez was approached during the recording sessions of Mi Reflejo and asked to produce a number of tracks. After agreeing, he produced many songs including the Jorge Luis Piloto written piece "Falsas Esperanzas".

"Falsas Esperanzas" is an uptempo Latin song that incorporates elements from tropical music. Instrumentation of the track comes from a horn done by Venezuelan-American musician by Ed Calle and a few Tropical elements, including a "snazzy" piano performance by Cuban musician Paquito Hechavarría. "According to music critic Kembrew McLeod, the track features 'bouncy rhythms' and 'splashes of horns'." Sun-Sentinel editor Sean Picolli wrote that the song's refrain contains a see-saw effect with the lines "No me des ... No me digas ..." (English: "Don't give me ... Don't tell me ..."). These lines hint toward lyrical themes pertaining to relationship troubles as well as defiance.

== Release and reception ==
"Falsas Esperanzas"
A 16-second sample of "Falsas Esperanzas", an uptempo Latin-flavored record that contains Tropical music influence.

"Falsas Esperanzas" was released as the third single from Mi Reflejo on July 2, 2001, in Spain and on July 3, 2001, in the United States. A remix of the song was released in Germany on July 17, 2001. It peaked at number seven on the Dutch Tipparade chart and number fifteen in Spain, and also appeared on the Spanish Airplay Chart in April 2001, peaking at number eighteen, as reported by Music & Media. Additionally, it reached number five on the Spanish Maxi Singles Sales chart. "Falsas Esperanzas" was later included on the Spanish edition of Aguilera's greatest hits album Keeps Gettin' Better: A Decade of Hits (2008).

Patty Gettelman from Orlando Sentinel thought that the piece had more Latin influence than contemporary Latin hits such as Ricky Martin's "La Vida Loca" or Lou Bega's "A Little Bit of Mambo". David Browne, writing for Entertainment Weekly, felt that "Falsas Esperanzas" left Aguilera "room to growl like a 'blues singer.'" Sonic.net editor Kembrew McLeon lauded the song as one of Aguilera's best uptempo songs that "breathe[s] life into the album". Picolli praised the song as the album's best track, noting: "a dizzy Vegas showstopper... that scoots along on Aguilera's high-flying harmonies and a defiant chorus". It has been called "one of Aguilera's greatest hits" by Rolling Stone en Español. Lucas Villa of Billboard called the song a "tropical bop". He also stated that the Dance Radio remix of "Falsas Esperanzas" was "sleek" and "added more bite to Aguilera's roar".

== Live performances ==
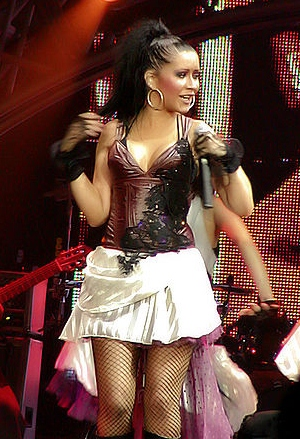
Aguilera performing the medley of "Contigo en la Distancia" and "Falsas Esperanzas" during The Stripped Tour (2003).

In December 2000, she held a one-hour special show on ABC and performed "Falsas Esperanzas", it was later recorded in a video release entitled My Reflection. Aguilera also gave a performance at the 2001 Grammy Awards in February, performing "Pero Me Acuerdo de Ti" and "Falsas Esperanzas" Leila Cobo of Billboard magazine called Aguilera's Grammy performance "remarkably mainstream". During her 2003 Justified and Stripped Tour, her first co-headlining tour with Justin Timberlake, she performed a medley of "Falsas Esperanzas" and "Contigo en la Distancia". At the end of the performance, a male dancer ripped off the skirt she wore, revealing "tiny" denim shorts underneath. Later, she "saucily" replied, "Just because my album name is Stripped, doesn't mean you can take my clothes off". She also performed the medley during the tour's extension, The Stripped Tour in late 2003; it was later included in the DVD release Stripped Live in the U.K..

In December 2019, Aguilera performed the song, along with "Pero Me Acuerdo de Ti" and "Contigo en la Distancia", during the Mexican leg of her concert tour, The X Tour.

== Media appearances ==
The song served as the main theme for the Mexican telenovela Como en el cine.

== Formats and track listings ==
CD single, Maxi-single (Spain)
No.	Title	Length
1.	"Falsas Esperanzas (Album Version)"	2:57
2.	"Falsas Esperanzas (Dance Radio Mix)"	3:26
3.	"Falsas Esperanzas (Spanish Dance Club Mix)"	5:24
4.	"Falsas Esperanzas (Tropical Mix)"	3:06
5.	"Falsas Esperanzas (Strictly For Deejays Mix)"	7:07

CD single, remixes (Germany)
No.	Title	Length
1.	"Falsas Esperanzas (Album Version)"	2:57
2.	"Falsas Esperanzas (Dance Radio Mix)"	3:26
3.	"Falsas Esperanzas (Tropical Mix)"	3:10

== Charts ==
Weekly charts for "Falsas Esperanzas"
Chart (2001)	Peak position
Argentina (CAPIF)	31
Mexico (AMPROFON)	4
Netherlands (Dutch Top 40 Tipparade)	7
Spain (Promusicae)	15
Venezuela (IFPI)	9

== Release history ==
Release dates and formats for "Falsas Esperanzas"
Region	Date	Format(s)	Label(s)	Ref.
Spain	April 9, 2001	Contemporary hit radio	BMG	
Spain	July 2, 2001	Maxi CD	BMG	
Germany	July 17, 2001	Maxi CD	BMG	
