= Come on Over Baby (All I Want Is You) =

2000 single by Christina Aguilera

Single by Christina Aguilera

from the album Christina Aguilera and Mi Reflejo
- B-side: "Ven Conmigo (Solamente Tú)"
- Released: July 11, 2000
- Recorded: October 1998 (album version); May 2000 (re-recorded version)
- Studio: Royaltone (North Hollywood, California)
- Genre: Bubblegum pop; dance-pop; teen pop
- Length: 3:23
- Label: RCA
- Songwriters: Johan Åberg; Paul Rein; Christina Aguilera; Ron Fair; Chaka Blackmon; Raymond Cham; Eric Dawkins; Shelly Peiken; Guy Roche
- Producers: Ron Fair; Celebrity Status

Christina Aguilera singles chronology
"I Turn to You" (2000)	"Come on Over Baby (All I Want Is You)" / "Ven Conmigo (Solamente Tú)" (2000)	"Pero Me Acuerdo de Ti" (2000)

Music videos
- "Come on Over Baby (All I Want Is You)" on YouTube; "Ven Conmigo (Solamente Tú)" on YouTube

"Come on Over Baby (All I Want Is You)" is a song by American singer Christina Aguilera from her debut studio album, Christina Aguilera (1999). Released as the album's fourth and final single on July 11, 2000, by RCA Records, it was the first song over which Aguilera was given significant creative control. "Come on Over Baby (All I Want Is You)" was written by Johan Åberg and Paul Rein, with Aguilera, Ron Fair, Chaka Blackmon, Raymond Cham, Eric Dawkins, Shelly Peiken and Guy Roche contributing to a re-recorded version. The album version of the song (Note: titled "Come on Over (All I Want Is You)") was produced by Aaron Zigman, Åberg and Rein, while the re-recorded version was produced by Fair and Celebrity Status.

Upon its release, "Come on Over Baby (All I Want Is You)" achieved international commercial success and critical acclaim. It was praised for its melody and "danceable" sound. In the United States, it became Aguilera's third number-one hit on the Billboard Hot 100. The single also reached top-ten positions in several countries, including Australia, Canada, Ireland, Singapore and the United Kingdom, and reached number one in Venezuela and Guatemala. The accompanying music video for "Come on Over Baby (All I Want Is You)" saw Aguilera experiment with her image, beginning an evolution of reinventions seen in the ensuing years of her career.

A Spanish-language version of the song was adapted by Rudy Pérez titled "Ven Conmigo (Solamente Tú)" which was recorded for Aguilera's Spanish-language follow-up album, Mi Reflejo (2000). "Ven Conmigo (Solamente Tú)" was released to Latin radio stations in the United States on August 8, 2000. It became a top ten hit in Spain, and a top five hit in El Salvador, Paraguay and Honduras.

== Background and recording ==
"Come on Over Baby (All I Want Is You)"
An 18-second sample of "Come on Over Baby (All I Want Is You)".

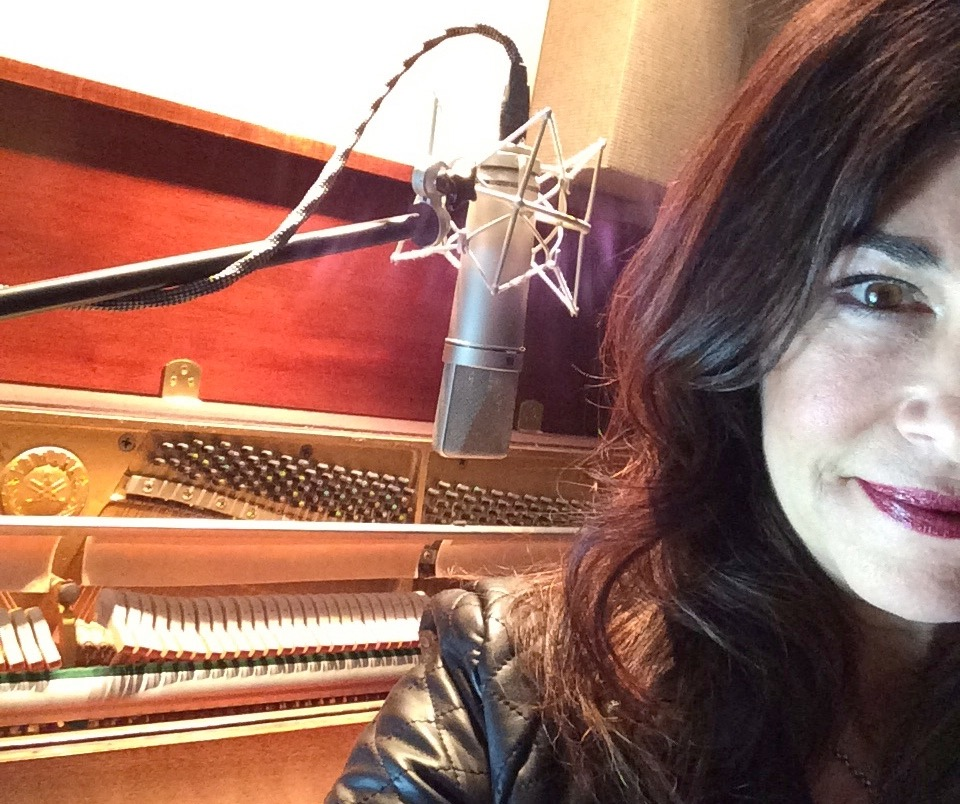
Due to a line reference borrowed from "What a Girl Wants", Shelly Peiken is listed as a co-writer of the song.

Like "What a Girl Wants" (the second single from the Christina Aguilera album), a new remixed and re-recorded version of "Come on Over Baby (All I Want Is You)" was released as a single rather than the original album version. The album version, which had been known simply as "Come on Over (All I Want Is You)", was seen as unsuitable for a single release. Aguilera is credited as a co-writer of the song.

The single version of "Come on Over (All I Want Is You)" was transformed into "Come on Over Baby (All I Want Is You)" with new and more sexual lyrics, a chord progression for the song's B-section, a bridge, a rap from Aguilera, a new mid-song dance breakdown, and more powerful vocals by Aguilera were also added. The song also features limited new elements from Shelly Peiken and Guy Roche. The original album version has no bridge, so it had previously been performed live with an interlude that sampled the disco classic "Got to Be Real" by Cheryl Lynn. However, when the original songwriters of "Got to Be Real" were contacted for permission to sample their song, they denied clearance. Instead, Aguilera's team substituted a reference to "What a Girl Wants".

Aguilera helped write the song's controversial and slightly sexual rap section from the re-recorded version. This rap (and also a section in the second verse in which Aguilera discusses sexuality and a man's hands on her body) caused Radio Disney to ban the song initially, as it had done with "Genie in a Bottle". The original album version of the song was allowed to be played, and an edited version of "Come on Over Baby (All I Want Is You)", which removed the second verse and rap, was also given some airplay. Reportedly, the re-recorded version received more airplay on the station than the album version of the song.

== Composition ==
"Come on Over Baby (All I Want Is You)" is written in the key of E♭ major with a tempo of 119 beats per minute in common time. The song follows a chord progression of E♭ – E♭/G – A♭ – B♭, and Aguilera's vocals span from E♭_{3} to G_{5}. It is generally considered to be a dance-pop and bubblegum pop track, however, Time magazine reporter David E. Thigpen called it a "gospel-tinged R&B rouser". The radio mix of the song is hip hop-influenced, featuring a rap verse written by Aguilera herself, and was deemed the most "sexual" track on the singer's debut album. In the song Aguilera raps: "Don't you wanna be the one tonight, we could do exactly what you like; don't you wanna be just you and me, we could do what comes so naturally". A music-related website, Can't Stop the Pop, noted that "thematically it sits close" to the singer's fourth studio album Stripped (2002). A mid-song dance breakdown was also added to the re-recorded version. It was Aguilera's first single that she'd had a hand in composing, although previously she adjusted some lyrics for "Genie in a Bottle", too.

== Critical reception ==
"Come on Over Baby (All I Want Is You)" was well received by most critics. Billboard's Mia Nazareno called the song a "Radio Disney-approved bop" and complimented its "addictive", "danceable" sound. Chris Malone, also from the Billboard magazine, noted that it was the singer's "first song where she was given significant creative control", and compared it to Whitney Houston's early recordings. He added: "It's pure, unadulterated, feel-good pop, and stands as a shining example of why Aguilera has been able to achieve so much success." Music critic Kenneth Partridge praised the re-recorded version of the single as "slightly rougher and randier" [than the original]. UKMix named it "an upbeat, funky extravaganza, showing her [Aguilera's] voice off to the max". In December 2000, Kai R. Lofthus of Music & Media ranked it as one of the five best songs of the year. In 2005, "Come on Over Baby" was listed in the book titled The 7,500 Most Important Songs of the Rock and Roll Era: 1944–2000 by Bruce Pollock, where the author called Aguilera "the voice of a new generation".

CDNow senior editor Eliseo Cardona wrote about Spanish version: "Indeed, the overly literal Spanish lyrics make for both a good laugh and a better yawn. This point is unwittingly made on 'Ven conmigo (Solamente tú),' the translation of 'Come on Over (All I Want Is You)'. If Spanish pop seems to make no sense at times, then this takes nonsense to the next level." A complete opposite opinion came from Wall of Sound editor Kurt B. Reighley; to him it sounds "especially sassy en Español." Parry Gettelman of Orlando Sentinel praised the vocals calling them "out-of-my-way." Sun-Sentinel music writer Sean Piccoli wrote: "Ven Conmigo (Come with Me) borrows its bounce from the better Whitney–Mariah numbers." In August 2020, Billboard named the song one of the "best 2000's Latin hits". It has been called "one of Aguilera's greatest hits" by Rolling Stone en Español. Jamie Tabberer from the Attitude magazine ranked "Come on Over Baby" at number ten on the list of Aguilera's seventeen best songs ever, Nicole Hogsett of Yahoo! placed it at number six on a similar list, and Mike Wass, writing for Idolator, called it a "bubblegum pop of the absolute highest caliber". Similarly, PopMatters editor Kimberley Hill praised the song as a "glittering bubblegum number".

== Chart performance ==
"Come on Over Baby (All I Want Is You)" became Aguilera's third number-one hit on the U.S. Billboard Hot 100, and was certified Platinum by RIAA, as well selling over 500,000 physical units in the country. It spent twenty-one weeks on the Hot 100, four of which were atop the chart, and ranked thirty-eighth on the Hot 100's 2000 year-end charts. After receiving a strong push from the record label and Aguilera herself, the single became a big hit. It had a stronger airplay than "What a Girl Wants", and its video became Aguilera's most popular to date, receiving strong airplay on MTV, VH1, Disney and Nickelodeon.

"Come on Over Baby (All I Want Is You)" reached the top ten in the UK, Japan and Australia and the top twenty in Canada, but was less successful in Continental Europe, reaching the top forty in most markets. It placed at number three in Iceland, number four in Hungary, number six in the Netherlands, number seven in Croatia, as well as number nine in Ireland, Poland and Scotland. On the UK Singles Chart the song peaked at number eight. The single became yet another international success for Aguilera, reaching No. 2 in New Zealand, where it stayed on the charts for thirteen weeks. The single was also certified Platinum in Australia. "Come on Over" stayed at No. 1 on Billboard for four weeks, and stayed on the Australian charts for twenty weeks.

The Spanish-language version of the single, "Ven Conmigo (Solamente Tú)", sticking to the original arrangement, was also a huge Latin music success, becoming Aguilera's first number-one single on Billboard's Hot Latin Tracks chart. It peaked at number two in El Salvador and Honduras, as well as number nine in Uruguay, as reported by El Siglo de Torreón. In Spain, it spent ten weeks at the PROMUSICAE's singles chart, debuting at number fourteen and eventually peaking at number eight on December 9, 2000. The original version of "Come on Over Baby" also achieved commercial success in Latin America, reaching the top spot in Guatemala and Venezuela.

== Music video ==
Aguilera walking down the flight of steps while singing to her male dancers

The music video for the song was directed by Paul Hunter, produced by Nina Huang, and choreographed by Tina Landon. The video was shot from June 12–15, 2000 and premiered in late July on MTV's Making the Video. It featured a racier image from Aguilera. Unlike her previous singles, she had red streaks in her hair and wore tighter clothing. The image Aguilera used in "Come on Over Baby (All I Want Is You)" was also used for Mi Reflejo and her first headlining tour in 2000. The music video for "Come on Over Baby (All I Want Is You)" premiered on MTV and VH1 the week ending on July 24, 2000, and was an instant hit, shooting to No. 1 on TRL in August 2000. When the music video aired on Disney Channel, some scenes were edited out and some of the sexual lyrics were censored. A second version of the video was released for the Spanish version of the song, "Ven Conmigo (Solamente Tú)". In this version, most scenes and choreography are parallel to the original, but Aguilera also appears singing next to a red chair. There were some prominent dancers that Aguilera & Tina Landon cast in this music video like Staci Flood, Taira Soo and Vergi Rodriguez.

=== Synopsis ===
The music video begins with Aguilera talking on the phone with her boyfriend, telling him to come over to her house. After she hangs up the phone, the scene breaks out into Aguilera wearing a white crop top and white pants, with red streaks in her hair. In the next scene, Aguilera has loose braided pigtails, a blue crop top, and blue and white checkered pants. She is in her bedroom, when suddenly she and her backup dancers begin dancing in front of a white background. The male dancers come out, and begin dancing with the female dancers. After that, Aguilera and her then-real life boyfriend Jorge Santos dance together with her backup dancers in the scene where everyone is wearing yellow and green outfits, first in a yellow-green background followed by a yellow-orange background.

The next scene is where her dancers dance on chairs in white open-faced cubes, intercut with Aguilera singing in a blue-walled background and a white drapery background. Aguilera and her backup dancers then dance in front of a white background. It cuts into a scene where Aguilera walks down a flight of steps in a red room, with her backup dancers on each step. She is wearing a white outfit (long pants and a tank top), and crystal jewellery on her stomach, around her bellybutton. They begin dancing again, and Aguilera's backup dancers hold up pieces of puzzle paper that shows the singer's face. Some of the dancers appearing in the music video include Staci Flood, Melanie Benz and Vergi Rodriguez.

== Live performances ==
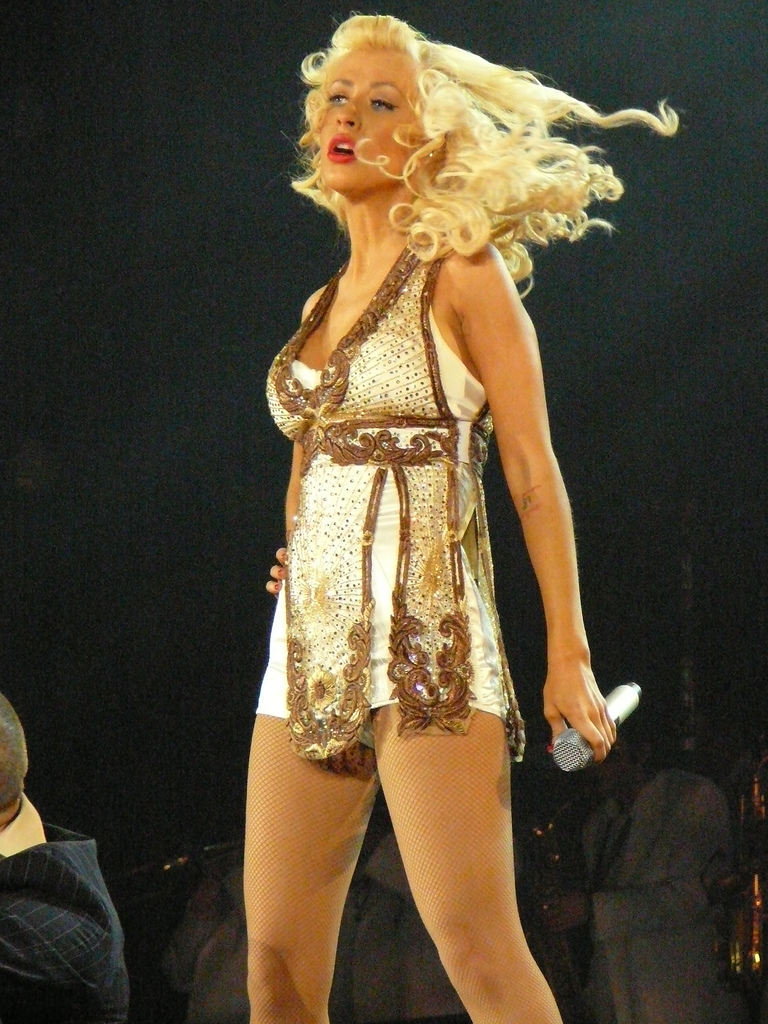
Aguilera performing a jazz version of "Come on Over Baby (All I Want Is You)" during the Back to Basics Tour

Aguilera performed "Come on Over Baby" in her tour Christina Aguilera: Live in Concert, an acoustic version on the Stripped World Tour, and a jazz version on the Back to Basics Tour. In the second leg of her "Christina Aguilera: In Concert", where she visited Puerto Rico, México, Venezuela, Panama and Japan, she replaced the song for the Spanish version of it "Ven Conmigo (Solamente Tú)". She also performed this version and "Pero Me Acuerdo de Ti" in Mexican comedy and variety show Otro Rollo. Aguilera performed "Come on Over Baby (All I Want Is You)" at the 2000 MTV Video Music Awards on September 7, 2000. She wore a striking red tight outfit, with black streaks in her hair previous to how she wore them in her music video, red high heels, and a tight ruby red crop top. At the end of Aguilera's performance, Fred Durst walked onstage and performed part of his band's song "Livin' It Up" with Aguilera. During the ceremony, Aguilera wore a revealing black outfit with black heels. After eliciting charged reactions from his fans, Durst stated: "I already told you guys before, I did it all for the nookie, man". The feud died weeks later. Aguilera denied Durst's statement, saying Durst "got no nookie".

In November 2000, Aguilera performed "Come on Over Baby" at the Radio Music Awards in Aladdin Casino & Resort, Las Vegas, and during the My VH1 Music Awards ceremony in Shrine Auditorium, Los Angeles. On October 7, 2002, Aguilera presented an acoustic version of the song during a concert in New York City. The performance was later broadcast by MTV as a special titled Stripped Live in New York City. In December 2013, Fuse recognized the show as one of the ten best performances in the singer's career.

== Usage in media and legacy ==
In 2000, Aguilera performed the Spanish version of the song "Ven Conmigo (Solamente Tú)" in the Telecinco's teen series Al salir de clase, where she also portrayed herself. The song was used in the 2003 video game Dead or Alive Xtreme Beach Volleyball. as well as the 2022 Netflix comedy film Senior Year, starring Rebel Wilson. In September 2025, Aguilera teamed up with gay-themed dating service Grindr for a collaboration — as a result, her song "Come on Over Baby" was used as a sound effect in the application, letting the users know they have a match.

== Covers ==
Mexican singer and actress Lucero performed "Ven Conmigo (Solamente Tú)" in her 32nd anniversary concert along with her team on La Voz... México; the performance was viewed by around ten thousand spectators. In the Peruvian show Yo Soy contestant Katherine Vega covered the song personifying Aguilera. This version was also used for a Coca-Cola commercial airing all over Latin America. The Spanish version of the song was also played in the film Spanglish while Cristina Moreno (Shelbie Bruce) is in the living room with the radio on and is featured in the soundtrack of the film. In 2023, "Ven Conmigo (Solamente Tú)" was featured in the sixth season of La Más Draga, performed by Cattriona Biñé.

== Track listings ==
- Single-CD: RCA / 74321 78102 2 Europe
1. "Come On Over Baby (All I Want Is You)" (Radio Version) (Chaka Blackmon, Christina Aguilera, Eric Dawkins, Guy Roche, Johan Aberg, Paul Rein, Ray Cham, Ron Fair, Shelly Peiken) – 3:23
2. "Ven Conmigo (Solamente Tú)" (Johan Aberg, Paul Rein, Rudy Pérez) – 3:12
3. "I Turn To You" (Cutfather & Joe Remix) (Diane Warren) – 4:14 1

== Personnel ==
Album version

- Johan Åberg – producer, recording, drum set programming
- Aaron Zigman – producer, vocals recording
- Paul Rein – producer, drum set programming, keyboards
- Peter Mokran – mixing
- Tony Flores – assistant mixing

Single version

- Michael C. Ross – recording
- Dave Way – mixing
- John Goux – guitars
- Ron Fair – harpsichord, piano, arranging
- Rick Baptist – horn
- Gary Grant – brass
- Joel Peskin – horn

== Charts ==
=== Weekly charts ===
Weekly chart performance for "Come on Over Baby (All I Want Is You)"
Chart (2000)	Peak position
Australia (ARIA)	9
Australian Dance (ARIA)	6
Austria (Ö3 Austria Top 40)	35
Belgium (Ultratop 50 Flanders)	21
Belgium (Ultratop 50 Wallonia)	22
Canada Top Singles (RPM)	4
Canada Adult Contemporary (RPM)	48
Canada CHR (Nielsen BDS)	5
Croatia International (HRT)	7
Europe (Eurochart Hot 100)	19
France (SNEP)	33
Germany (GfK)	23
Guatemala (El Siglo de Torreón)	1
Hungary (MAHASZ)	4
Iceland (Íslenski Listinn Topp 20)	3
Ireland (IRMA)	9
Italy (FIMI)	31
Netherlands (Dutch Top 40)	6
Netherlands (Single Top 100)	9
New Zealand (Recorded Music NZ)	2
Poland (Polish Airplay Charts)	9
Scandinavia (Music & Media)	8
Scottish Singles Sales (Official Charts)	9
Singapore (SPVA)	3
Sweden (Sverigetopplistan)	23
Switzerland (Schweizer Hitparade)	21
UK Singles (Official Charts)	8
UK Hip Hop/R&B (Official Charts)	4
US Billboard Hot 100	1
US Adult Pop Airplay (Billboard)	36
US Pop Airplay (Billboard)	4
US Rhythmic Airplay (Billboard)	6
Venezuela (El Siglo de Torreón)	1

Weekly chart performance for "Ven Conmigo (Solamente Tú)"
Chart (2000−2001)	Peak position
Chile (El Siglo de Torreón)	8
El Salvador (El Siglo de Torreón)	2
Honduras (El Siglo de Torreón)	2
Paraguay (IFPI)	2
Spain (Promusicae)	8
Uruguay (El Siglo de Torreón)	9
US Hot Latin Songs (Billboard)	1
US Tropical Airplay (Billboard)	1

=== Year-end charts ===
Year-end chart performance for "Come on Over Baby (All I Want Is You)"
Chart (2000)	Position
Australia (ARIA)	31
Belgium (Ultratop 50 Wallonia)	98
Brazil (Crowley)	35
Netherlands (Dutch Top 40)	49
Netherlands (Single Top 100)	65
Switzerland (Schweizer Hitparade)	87
US Billboard Hot 100	38
US Mainstream Top 40 (Billboard)	34
US Rhythmic Top 40 (Billboard)	32

Year-end chart performance for "Ven Conmigo (Solamente Tú)"
Chart (2000)	Position
US Hot Latin Tracks (Billboard)	40

== Certifications and sales ==
Certifications for "Come on Over Baby (All I Want Is You)"
Region	Certification	Certified units/sales
Australia (ARIA)	Platinum	70,000^{^}
Canada (Music Canada)	Gold	40,000^{‡}
Mexico (AMPROFON) Spanish version	Platinum+Gold	90,000^{‡}
New Zealand (RMNZ)	Gold	5,000^{*}
New Zealand (RMNZ) digital	Gold	15,000^{‡}
United Kingdom (BPI)	Silver	200,000^{^}
United States (RIAA)	Platinum	1,000,000^{‡}
^{*} Sales figures based on certification alone.^{^} Shipments figures based on certification alone.^{‡} Sales+streaming figures based on certification alone.

== Release history ==
Release dates and formats for "Come on Over Baby (All I Want Is You)"
Region	Date	Version	Format(s)	Label(s)	Ref(s).
United States	July 11, 2000	"Come on Over Baby (All I Want Is You)"	Contemporary hit radio; rhythmic contemporary radio	RCA	
United States	August 8, 2000	"Ven Conmigo (Solamente Tú)"	Latin pop radio	RCA	
Australia	September 11, 2000	"Come on Over Baby (All I Want Is You)"	Maxi CD	BMG	
Germany	September 11, 2000	"Come on Over Baby (All I Want Is You)"	Maxi CD	BMG	
Spain	September 11, 2000	"Ven Conmigo (Solamente Tú)"	CD	BMG	
Sweden	September 11, 2000	"Come on Over Baby (All I Want Is You)"	Maxi CD	RCA	
France	September 22, 2000	"Come on Over Baby (All I Want Is You)"	Maxi CD	BMG	
United States	September 26, 2000	"Come on Over Baby (All I Want Is You)"	Cassette; CD	RCA	
United Kingdom	October 30, 2000	"Come on Over Baby (All I Want Is You)"	12-inch vinyl; cassette; CD	RCA	
France	November 21, 2000	"Come on Over Baby (All I Want Is You)"	CD	BMG	

== See also ==
- List of Billboard Hot 100 number-one singles of 2000
- List of number-one Billboard Hot Latin Tracks of 2000
- List of number-one Billboard Latin Tropical Airplay of 2000
