= Mi Reflejo =

Studio album by Christina Aguilera
- Released: September 12, 2000
- Recorded: 1999–2000
- Studios: North Bay Recording (Miami Beach, Florida); Royaltone (North Hollywood, California); Cocoa-Butt (Culver City, California); House of Sound Recording (Miami Beach, Florida); The War Room (New Jersey); LA East (Salt Lake City, Utah)
- Genre: Latin pop
- Length: 42:35
- Language: Spanish
- Labels: RCA; BMG US Latin
- Producers: Johan Aberg; David Frank; Steve Kipner; Rudy Pérez; Paul Rein; Guy Roche; Matthew Wilder

Christina Aguilera chronology
Christina Aguilera (1999)	Mi Reflejo (2000)	My Kind of Christmas (2000)

Singles from Mi Reflejo
- 1. "Ven Conmigo (Solamente Tú)" Released: August 8, 2000; 2. "Pero Me Acuerdo de Ti" Released: December 2000; 3. "Falsas Esperanzas" Released: July 3, 2001

Mi Reflejo (transl. My Reflection) is the first Spanish-language and second overall studio album by American singer Christina Aguilera. It was released on September 12, 2000, as a co-production between RCA Records and BMG US Latin. After the commercial success of her self-titled debut in 1999, Aguilera recorded her follow-up project. Mi Reflejo includes five Spanish-language versions from her debut album, as well as four original compositions and two cover songs. The tracks were adapted and composed by Rudy Pérez, who also produced the album.

In the United States, Mi Reflejo topped the Billboard Top Latin Albums and Latin Pop Albums charts for 19 weeks each, becoming one of the longest-running number one albums on the former chart. Mi Reflejo was the best-selling Latin pop album of 2000 and the Recording Industry Association of America (RIAA) certified it 6× Platinum (Latin field). It reached number two in Argentina and Uruguay, and number five in Mexico, and had sold 2.2 million copies worldwide by 2006.

Upon its release, Mi Reflejo received generally mixed reviews from music critics, who were divided on the album's musical style and criticized Aguilera's Spanish-language adaptations. The album received several accolades, including the Latin Grammy Award for Best Female Pop Vocal Album and a Grammy nomination for Best Latin Pop Album in 2001. Three of the album's songs were released as singles: "Ven Conmigo (Solamente Tú)", "Pero Me Acuerdo de Ti" and "Falsas Esperanzas". To promote Mi Reflejo, Aguilera added eight dates to her tour, continuing it into 2001, with a performance at the 43rd Annual Grammy Awards.

== Background and recording ==
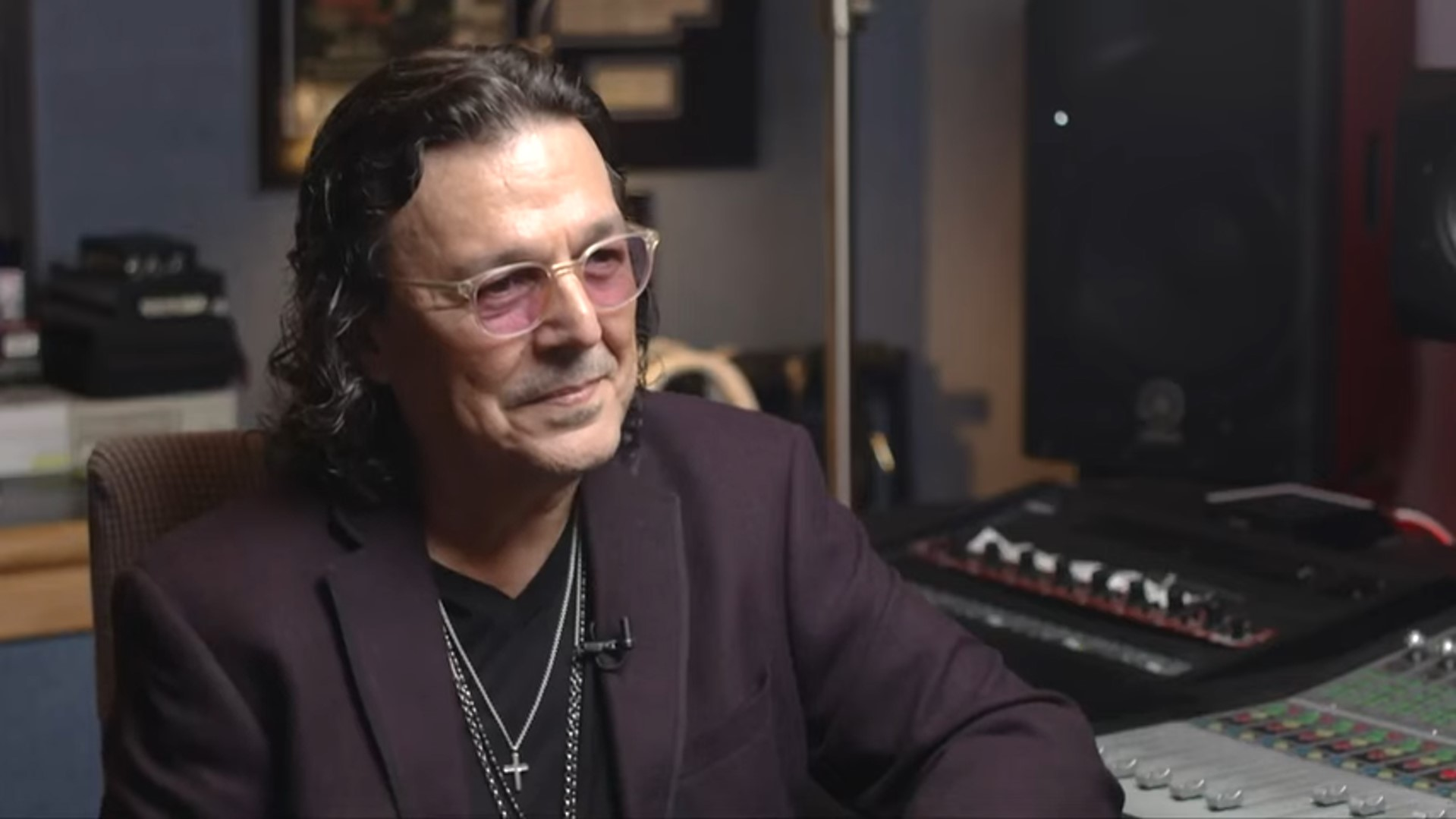
Mi Reflejo was co-produced by Cuban American musician Rudy Pérez who adapted five of Christina Aguilera's songs from her debut album while also penning three original songs.

In 1999, American singer Christina Aguilera released her debut self-titled album, which sold over 14 million copies and earned her the Grammy Award for Best New Artist in 2000. Aguilera, who is of Ecuadorian descent on her father's side, expressed a desire to record an album to acknowledge her Latina heritage. According to Vista, the song selection process was difficult as over 300 compositions were considered for the album. By October 1999, Billboard editor John Lannert reported she had begun working on an album in Spanish with Cuban American musician Rudy Pérez as producer. According to her manager Steve Kurtz, Aguilera expressed interest in recording a Spanish-language album before she recorded her debut album. She recorded "Genie in a Bottle" in Spanish; the resulting recording, "Genio Atrapado", peaked at number 13 on the Billboard Hot Latin Songs chart. Ramiro Burr of the San Antonio Express-News reported that the new material would contain several of her songs adapted in Spanish, as well as original songs in that language. Talking about embracing her Ecuadorian roots with Mi Reflejo, Aguilera said:

My message, as in all my music, stands for being fearless to explore who you are. It's never too late to open a new door. Although it's scary to dive into territory that isn't your first language, it still doesn't erase who I am and how I want to express myself in all aspects of what intrigues and inspires me.

Recording for the album primarily took place at Pérez's home studio in Miami Beach, Florida. Additional recording took place at Royaltone Studios and Cocoa-Butt in California, House of Sound Recording Studios in Florida, The War Room in New Jersey and LA East in Utah. Because Aguilera was touring with American group TLC at the time, she visited Pérez's home studio "only a few days at a time". Aguilera was simultaneously touring to promote her debut album and recording a Christmas album, My Kind of Christmas (2000). Recording for Mi Reflejo began in April 2000 and concluded three months later. Pérez stated Aguilera's lack of fluency in Spanish hindered recording; he phonetically wrote lyrics and developed a system to allow Aguilera to pronounce the "r's" in the songs. The album and its title, Mi Reflejo, were announced on August 8, 2000. The album's title is taken from the Spanish version of "Reflection", a track Aguilera recorded for the soundtrack to Mulan. Her record label, RCA, said the title also reflects Aguilera's Latina heritage. Prior to the announcement, it was originally titled Latin Lover Girl.

== Musical style and compositions ==
"Falsas Esperanzas"
A 16-second sample of "Falsas Esperanzas", one of the four original songs composed for Mi Reflejo. The Sun-Sentinel writer Sean Piccoli referred it as a " dizzy Vegas showstopper" that showcases Aguilera's "high-flying harmonies and a defiant chorus". Piccoli also noted Ed Calle's contributions to the horn section on the track.

Musically, Mi Reflejo is a Latin pop album that is according to Burr, "equally balanced between bouncy dance tunes and melodramatic ballads". The album is composed of 11 tracks; five of which are songs from Aguilera's debut album adapted in Spanish, while six are new.

Pėrez reworked Spanish versions of "Genie in a Bottle" ("Genio Atrapado"), "Come On Over Baby (All I Want Is You)" ("Ven Conmigo (Solamente Tú)"), "I Turn to You" ("Por Siempre Tú"), "What a Girl Wants" ("Una Mujer"), and "Reflection" ("Mi Reflejo"). He also composed three original tracks for the album: "El Beso del Final", "Si No Te Hubiera Conocido", and "Cuando No es Contigo", while Cuban musician Jorge Luis Piloto penned "Falsas Esperanzas". The record also includes two covers: "Pero Me Acuerdo de Ti", which Pérez originally composed for Mexican singer Gibrann on his album Escapate Conmigo (1990); and "Contigo en la Distancia", a 1950s bolero written by César Portillo de la Luz.

"Falsas Esperanzas" is an uptempo track with tropical elements and includes a piano solo by Cuban pianist Paquito Hechavarría. In the song, Aguilera protests against being misled, instructing her love interest to treat her right. On the ballad, "El Beso del Final", the singer questions whether a kiss marks the end of their relationship. The album's second ballad, "Pero Me Acuerdo", explores the tumultuous emotions following a breakup. The lyrics portray someone who has regained their confidence and moved on, only to experience a resurgence of emotions triggered by memories of their former partner. "Si No Te Hubiera Conocido" is a ballad performed with Puerto Rican singer Luis Fonsi. Aguilera wanted to perform a duet with Fonsi, citing their shared musical influences. "Cuando No es Contigo" is an uptempo salsa song which was arranged and produced by American musician Sergio George.

== Release and promotion ==
Mi Reflejo was released on September 12, 2000, as a joint venture between RCA and BMG US Latin. To promote the album, Aguilera extended her Christina Aguilera in Concert tour into 2001, with eight more dates. The campaign for the Latin market was titled "Ven Conmigo" and was sponsored by Coca-Cola. The extension included visits to Mexico, Puerto Rico, Venezuela, Panama, and Japan. Aguilera also performed "Pero Me Acuerdo de Ti" and "Falsas Esperanzas" at the 2001 Grammy Awards.

=== Singles ===
Released as the lead single of Mi Reflejo, "Ven Conmigo (Solamente Tú)" was serviced to Latin radio stations on August 8, 2000. The song reached number one on the Billboard Hot Latin Songs and number two on the Billboard Latin Pop Airplay charts. It peaked at number eight in Spain. The second single, "Pero Me Acuerdo de Ti", released in December 2000, peaked at number eight on the Hot Latin Songs and number five on the Latin Pop Airplay charts. Kevin G. Bray directed the song's music video.

The third single, "Falsas Esperanzas", was released on July 3, 2001, and reached number fifteen in Spain. Its music video, taken from her DVD My Reflection, was directed by Lawrence Jordan. "Por Siempre Tú" was released in 2000 alongside its original English track as a promotional single for the album. It peaked at number six on the Hot Latin Songs chart.".

== Commercial performance ==
In the United States, Mi Reflejo peaked at number 27 on the Billboard 200, selling nearly 43,000 copies in its first week. The same week, the album debuted at number one on the Billboard Top Latin Albums chart, replacing Son by Four's eponymous album. Mi Reflejo spent 19 weeks at number one until was it replaced by Vicente Fernández's compilation album Historia de un Idolo, Vol. 1. Mi Reflejo debuted at number one on the Billboard Latin Pop Albums chart, where it succeeded Galería Caribe by Ricardo Arjona. It spent 19 weeks on top of this chart until it was replaced by Abrázame Muy Fuerte by Juan Gabriel. According to Nielsen SoundScan, Mi Reflejo had sold 487,000 copies in the US by 2014. On September 7, 2001, the Recording Industry Association of America (RIAA) certified the album 6× Platinum in the Latin field for shipping 600,000 copies.

Internationally, Mi Reflejo peaked at number two on the Argentine albums chart and the Cámara Argentina de Productores de Fonogramas y Videogramas (CAPIF) certified it platinum. Mi Reflejo also reached number two in Uruguay, as reported by Cámara Uruguaya del Disco (CUD) in late 2000. It peaked at number 54 in Switzerland and was certified double platinum in Mexico by the Asociación Mexicana de Productores de Fonogramas y Videogramas (AMPROFON). It reached number five on the official Mexican Albums Chart. In Spain, Mi Reflejo peaked at number 12 on the Spanish Albums Chart and was certified Platinum in the country for shipping 100,000 copies. Mi Reflejo had sold 300,000 copies in Costa Rica by 2004, and it was also a commercial success in Colombia, Peru and Venezuela. By 2006, Mi Reflejo had sold 2.2 million copies worldwide. According to Pérez: "I think the mainstream market only knows about us when there's a major success like [Mi Reflejo]. But we just did the same thing we always do".

== Critical reception ==
Professional ratings
Aggregate scores
Source	Rating
Metacritic	56/100
Review scores
Source	Rating
AllMusic	2.5/5 stars
Entertainment Weekly	C
El Norte	2/5 stars
Los Angeles Times	2/4 stars
Orlando Sentinel	2.5/5 stars
Sonicnet	3/5 stars
Wall of Sound	72/100

At Metacritic, which assigns a normalized rating out of 100 to reviews from mainstream critics, Mi Reflejo received an average score of 56, based on seven reviews, indicating "mixed or average reviews". Stephen Thomas Erlewine of AllMusic described the album as a mirror image of Christina Aguilera. He found the songs to be a "little too familiar" while praising them as being "well-produced". Erlewine concluded the album "doesn't add anything new to her music, since it's just the old music in new clothing". An editor for Billboard wrote that Aguilera had yielded a mostly mainstream pop album with Latin inflections. Eliseo Cardona of CDNow gave the album a mixed review. While he enjoyed Aguilera's vocal performance, which he said "not only sways and grooves – precisely, gracefully, forcefully – but also sounds lived-in and real", he criticized the literal Spanish translation of the lyrics, which he said makes for a "good laugh and a better yawn". He commended "Cuando No es Contigo" for making Aguilera a "credible, expressive salsera" and her cover of "Contigo en la Distancia" as the album's finest moment.

David Browne of Entertainment Weekly wrote his review as a parody memo from Aguilera's point of view. He mocked Aguilera's attempt at making a Spanish-language album because of her Ecuadorian heritage, criticized her "unnecessary high notes", ballads that "old Latin ladies'll like" and the photographs used in the album's booklet. Mike Magnuson of HOB.com wrote a critical review of the album, admonishing the artwork images for attempting to make Aguilera look Latino, which he called a bad influence for the younger audience. Though he said "you can count on her agreeable voice", and lauded the use of Latin percussion and horns, he stated the album is "purely a marketing scam gone too far". Parry Gettelman from Orlando Sentinel stated Mi Reflejo "lacks emotional depth, and [Aguilera's] decision to record in Spanish seems more a bid to conquer new chart territory than anything else".

SonicNet, an entertainment news website, called the album's production "superslick" and compared Aguilera's vocals to that of Mariah Carey, saying Mi Reflejo "almost guarantees that the diminutive diva will expand her colonial powers south of the border. In other words, she's planning to do a reverse Ricky Martin on us". In a negative review of the album, Ernesto Lechner of Los Angeles Times compared Aguilera's vocals on her debut album and in Mi Reflejo, describing her performance in the latter as "ridiculous" and her cover of "Contigo en la Distancia" as a "bloated confection". Kurt B. Reighley from Wall of Sound wrote that the album is "an impressive addition to young Christina's limited canon". Sean Piccoli, writing for Sun-Sentinel, said Mi Reflejo is mostly a "hash of power balladry, dance pop and adult contemporary schlock rush-recorded for Latin radio", and concluded it "sounds more like a marketing opportunity than an expression of Aguilera's Latin soul".

Zero magazine called Mi Reflejo a "decent effort", praising the re-recorded Spanish tracks as "excellent" but criticized songs such as "Falsas Esperanzas" for portraying Aguilera as a "third-rate Gloria Estefan". Zero felt that Aguilera was unaware of what she was singing and criticized her interpretation of "Contigo en la Distancia". Writing for El Norte, Deborah Davis reviewed Mi Reflejo unfavorably, saying Aguilera should not have recorded an album in Spanish before mastering it, and that the elements of salsa and guitars are stereotypical of Latinos.

=== Accolades ===
Year	Ceremony	Category	Recipient	Result	Ref.
2001	Billboard Latin Music Awards	Pop Album of the Year by a Female Artist	Mi Reflejo	Won	
2001	Billboard Latin Music Awards	Pop Album of the Year by a New Artist	Mi Reflejo	Won	
2001	Blockbuster Entertainment Awards	Favorite Artist (Note: Aguilera received this accolade for releasing the album Mi Reflejo.)	Herself	Won	
2001	Grammy Awards	Best Latin Pop Album	Mi Reflejo	Nominated	
2001	Latin Grammy Awards	Best Female Pop Vocal Album	Mi Reflejo	Won	
2001	Lo Nuestro Awards	Pop Album of the Year	Mi Reflejo	Nominated	
2001	Lo Nuestro Awards	Pop Female Artist of the Year	Herself	Won	
2001	Lo Nuestro Awards	Pop New Artist of the Year	Herself	Won	

== Legacy and achievements ==
In September 2018, Mi Reflejo was ranked number 10 on the Billboard's Top 20 Latin Albums of All Time. Mi Reflejo was the fifth-best-selling Latin album of 2000 and became the second-best-selling Latin album of the following year after Paulina by Paulina Rubio. The album was also the best-selling Latin pop album of 2000.

In a 2020 statement for Billboard, Aguilera said she "was excited to bring a new life to [the] songs and reinvent [them]". She added that she "was allowed to create and express new ad libs and vocal runs that I wasn’t given the freedom to do on [her debut album]". New York Daily News writer Muri Assuncão noted that after the release of Mi Reflejo, Aguilera went on to use "her Latin charm and sultry persona – not to mention her jaw-dropping four-octave vocal range – to become one of pop music's most beloved icons". According to a 2021 article for POPline, Mi Reflejo introduced Aguilera to the general public as a "fearless" and "versatile" artist, and also "played a pivotal role in the expansion of Spanish-language music within today's American pop scene". In 2025, Billboard included Mi Reflejo on its list of the Top Latin Albums of the 21st century.

== Track listing ==
Standard edition
No.	Title	Lyrics	Music	Production	Length
1.	"Genio Atrapado" (Spanish version of "Genie in a Bottle")	Rudy Pérez	David Frank; Steve Kipner; Pam Sheyne	Pérez; Frank; Kipner	3:37
2.	"Falsas Esperanzas" ("False Hopes")	Jorge Luis Piloto	Piloto	Pérez	2:57
3.	"El Beso del Final" ("The Final Kiss")	Pérez	Franne Golde; Tom Snow	Pérez	4:41
4.	"Pero Me Acuerdo de Ti" ("But I Remember You")	Pérez	Pérez	Pérez	4:26
5.	"Ven Conmigo (Solamente Tú)" (Spanish version of "Come on Over Baby (All I Want Is You)")	Pérez	Johan Åberg; Paul Rein	Pérez; Aberg; Rein	3:11
6.	"Si No Te Hubiera Conocido" ("If I Hadn't Met You", with Luis Fonsi)	Pérez	Pérez	Pérez	4:50
7.	"Contigo en la Distancia" ("With You in the Distance")	César Portillo de la Luz	Portillo de la Luz	Pérez	3:44
8.	"Cuando No Es Contigo" ("When It's Not With You")	Pérez; Manuel López	Pérez; López	Pérez; Sergio George	4:10
9.	"Por Siempre Tú" (Spanish version of "I Turn to You")	Pérez	Diane Warren	Pérez; Guy Roche	4:05
10.	"Una Mujer" (Spanish version of "What a Girl Wants")	Pérez	Guy Roche; Shelly Peiken	Pérez; Roche	3:14
11.	"Mi Reflejo" (Spanish version of "Reflection")	Pérez	Matthew Wilder	Pérez; Wilder	3:33
Total length:					42:35

Special edition
No.	Title	Length
12.	"Falsas Esperanzas" (dance radio Mix)	3:27
13.	"Falsas Esperanzas" (tropicalmix)	3:10
14.	"Pero Me Acuerdo de Ti" (remix)	3:41
15.	"Ven Conmigo (Solamente Tú)" (karaoke version)	3:12
Total length:		56:10

== Personnel ==
Adapted from the liner notes of AllMusic.

Musicians

- Christina Aguilera – vocals
- Richard Bravo – percussion
- Ed Calle – saxophone
- Tony Concepcion – trumpet
- Geannie Cruz – background vocals
- Luis Fonsi – performer
- David Frank – drums, keyboard
- Jerry Goldsmith – conductor
- John Goux – guitar
- Paquito Hechavarría – piano
- Julio Hernandez – bass
- Steve Kipner – drums, keyboard
- Matt Laug – tambourine
- Lee Levin – drums
- Manny Lopez – acoustic guitar
- Raúl Midón – background vocals
- Rafael Padilla – percussion
- Agustin Pantoja – palmadas
- Wendy Pederson – vocals
- Rudy Pérez – producer, arranger, songwriter, keyboards, Spanish guitar
- Clay Perry – keyboard, programming
- Tim Pierce – guitar
- Rubén Rodríguez – electric bass
- Michael C. Ross – keyboard
- Dana Teboe – trombone
- Michael Thompson – guitar
- Dan Warner – guitar
- Matthew Wilder – orchestration
- Aaron Zigman – orchestration

Production

- Producer: Rudy Pérez
- Executive producers: Ron Fair, Diane Warren
- Engineers: Paul Arnold, Bob Brockman, Mario DeJesús, Mike Greene, Mario Lucy, Joel Numa, Paul Rein, Michael C. Ross, Bruce Weeden
- Assistant engineers: Tom Bender, Michael Huff
- Mixing: Mike Couzzi, Mick Guzauski, Peter Mokran, Dave Way, Bruce Weeden
- Programming: Rudy Pérez, Guy Roche, Michael C. Ross
- Drum programming: Rudy Pérez
- Percussion programming: Rudy Pérez
- Arrangers: Rudy Pérez, Ed Calle, David Frank, Sergio George, Ron Harris
- vocal arrangement: Ron Fair
- String arrangements: Gary Lindsay, Rudy Pérez
- Vocal arrangement: Rudy Pérez
- Orchestration: Matthew Wilder, Aaron Zigman

== Charts ==
=== Weekly charts ===
Chart (2000–2001)	Peak position
Argentine Albums (CAPIF)	2
Japanese Albums (Oricon)	59
Mexican Albums (AMPROFON)	5
Spanish Albums (Promusicae)	12
Swiss Albums (Schweizer Hitparade)	54
Uruguayan Albums (CUD)	2
US Billboard 200	27
US Top Latin Albums (Billboard)	1
US Latin Pop Albums (Billboard)	1

=== Year-end charts ===
Chart (2000)	Peak position
US Top Latin Albums (Billboard)	5
US Latin Pop Albums (Billboard)	1

Chart (2001)	Peak position
US Top Latin Albums (Billboard)	2
US Latin Pop Albums (Billboard)	2

=== Decade-end charts ===
Chart (2000–2009)	Position
US Top Latin Albums (Billboard)	13
US Latin Pop Albums (Billboard)	7

== Certifications and sales ==
Region	Certification	Certified units/sales
Argentina (CAPIF)	Platinum	114,000
Chile (IFPI Chile)	Gold	15,000
Mexico (AMPROFON)	2× Platinum	300,000^{‡}
Spain (Promusicae)	Platinum	100,000^{^}
United States (RIAA)	6× Platinum (Latin)	489,000
Summaries
Worldwide	—	2,200,000
^{^} Shipments figures based on certification alone.^{‡} Sales+streaming figures based on certification alone.

== See also ==
- 2000 in Latin music
- List of best-selling Latin albums
- List of number-one Billboard Top Latin Albums of 2000
- List of number-one Billboard Top Latin Albums of 2001
- List of number-one Billboard Latin Pop Albums from the 2000s
