= Show Me How You Burlesque =

Single by Christina Aguilera

from the album Burlesque: Original Motion Picture Soundtrack
- B-side: "Express"
- Released: February 4, 2011
- Recorded: 2009
- Studio: Larrabee Sound Studios (North Hollywood, CA); The Boom Boom Room (Burbank, CA); The Village Recorder (Los Angeles, CA); Triangle Sound Studios (Atlanta, GA)
- Genre: Dance-pop; jazz; R&B
- Length: 2:59
- Label: RCA
- Songwriters: Christina Aguilera; C. "Tricky" Stewart; Claude Kelly
- Producers: C. "Tricky" Stewart; Claude Kelly

Christina Aguilera singles chronology
| "Express" (2010) | "Show Me How You Burlesque" (2011) | "Moves like Jagger" (2011) |

Audio video
- "Show Me How You Burlesque" on YouTube

"Show Me How You Burlesque" is a song recorded by American singer Christina Aguilera for the accompanying soundtrack album to the film Burlesque (2010), which stars Aguilera. It was written by Aguilera, C. "Tricky" Stewart and Claude Kelly and was produced by Stewart. The song was released for digital download onto iTunes Store in 2010. Before being released, a demo version of the track, entitled "Spotlight" was leaked online.

"Show Me How You Burlesque" received generally positive reviews from music critics, who praised it as one of the best tracks from the soundtrack. The song charted on several record charts, peaking at number 8 in New Zealand as well as within the top 30 in Australia, Finland, and Switzerland. Aguilera performed "Show Me How You Burlesque" on the eleventh season of U.S. television dancing competition Dancing with the Stars in November 2010.

== Background and composition ==
In support of her sixth studio album, Bionic, Aguilera announced plans for the Bionic Tour. However, on May 24, 2010, the singer and tour promoter Live Nation both posted messages on their websites stating that due to excessive promotion of Bionic and preparing for her upcoming film debut in Burlesque, she felt she would need more time to be able to put together a show that her fans deserve to see. Aguilera stated that this was not possible to do in less than one month between the release of the album and the start of the tour as she would need more time to rehearse. On the accompanying soundtrack for the film, Aguilera had worked with Tricky Stewart. Stewart was the co-writer and producer of two songs, "Show Me How You Burlesque" and "Express", and also produced a number of tracks, including "Something's Got a Hold on Me", "Tough Lover" and "But I Am a Good Girl".

Before being officially released, in early 2010, a demo version of the song, entitled "Spotlight", was leaked online. On February 4, 2011, the single was released as a digital download on iTunes Store. "Show Me How You Burlesque" was written by Aguilera, Christopher Stewart and Claude Kelly, and was produced by Tricky Stewart. Its music incorporates dance-pop, jazz and R&B genres. Instrumentation comes from saxophone, trombone, trumpet and percussion. The track lasts for a duration of 2:59 (two minutes and 59 seconds). Set on the "freely" tempo of 100–110 beats per minute, "Show Me How You Burlesque" was composed in the key of B minor. Aguilera's vocals on the track span two octaves, from the low-note of F♯_{3} to the high-note of F♯_{5}.

== Reception ==
"Show Me How You Burlesque" garnered mainly positive reviews from music critics. An online blog network, Blogcritics, agreed that the track, alongside "Express" are the two best songs throughout the soundtrack. It also wrote, "Both ['Express' and 'Show Me How You Burlesque'] work better in the context of the movie, where the elaborate visuals help distract from their lack of melody and strong hooks. They are passable album filler tracks". Movie Exclusive called the song "soulful" and deemed it as one of the "greatest testaments to how Aguilera is one of the greatest performers of all time". Alissa LeClair from Movie Buzzers was also positive toward the track, stated that "Show Me How You Burlesque", among with "But I Am a Good Girl", "Express", and "Guy What Takes His Time"; are materials that complement Aguilera's talent, as well as shows how well the singer prepared to be a good dancer for the film project.

Upon the release of Burlesque, "Show Me How You Burlesque" charted in several countries. In the United States, the song peaked at number 70 on the Billboard Hot 100 chart and remained for one week. On the Canadian Hot 100 chart, it peaked at number 92. In Germany, "Show Me How You Burlesque" peaked at number 89 on the Media Control Charts. On January 23, 2011, the song debuted at number 23 on the Swiss Hitparade chart. The following week, it dropped to number 30 and continued to fall down on the chart, staying for a total of 5 weeks. On January 30, 2011, "Show Me How You Burlesque" entered the Australian Singles Chart at number 29. It remained on the chart until February 13. In New Zealand, "Show Me How You Burlesque" was a commercial success. On January 17, 2011, the song debuted at number 33 on the New Zealand singles chart. The following week, it climbed to number 8, becoming the only song from the soundtrack to reach the top 10. The song also reached the top 50 in Poland.

== Live performances and covers ==
To promote Burlesque, Aguilera has performed several songs from the soundtrack live, including "Show Me How You Burlesque". On November 23, 2010, Aguilera performed "Show Me How You Burlesque" during the season finale of the eleventh season of U.S. television dancing competition Dancing with the Stars. She performed in the "sparkly gold costume" with back-up male and female dancers. Story Gilmore of Neon Limelight commented about the performance, "The star brought the burlesque lounge to life in a spicy performance". He also praised Aguilera's vocals and outfits during the show, writing "[She] belted at the top of her talented lungs in true Christina fashion".

South Korean singer Hyolyn covered the song two times — in 2013, during the You Hee-yeol's Sketchbook variety show, and again during her 2022 concert.

== In the media ==
In the second season of RuPaul's Secret Celebrity Drag Race AJ McLean performed the song in drag under the pseudonym Poppy Love.

== Track listing ==
Digital download

1. "Show Me How You Burlesque" – 2:59

== Credits and personnel ==
- Vocals – Christina Aguilera
- Songwriting – Christina Aguilera, C. "Tricky" Stewart, Claude Kelly
- Producing – C. "Tricky" Stewart
- Vocals producing – Claude Kelly
- Saxophone – James King
- Trombone – Alejandro Carballo
- Trumpet – Arturo Solar
- Percussion – Joan Manuel Leguizamo, Pablo Correa
- Engineer – Andrew Wuepper, Brian Thomas, Pat Thrall
- Assistant engineer – Chris Galland, Luis Navarro
- Mixing – Jaycen Joshua
- Assistant mixing – Jesus Garnica

== Charts ==
| Chart (2010–2011) | Peak position |
|---|---|
| Australia (ARIA) | 29 |
| Canada Hot 100 (Billboard) | 92 |
| Canadian Digital Song Sales (Billboard) | 47 |
| Finland (Suomen virallinen lista) | 23 |
| Germany (GfK) | 89 |
| New Zealand (Recorded Music NZ) | 8 |
| Switzerland (Schweizer Hitparade) | 26 |
| US Billboard Hot 100 | 70 |

== Certifications ==
| Region | Certification | Certified units/sales |
|---|---|---|
| United Kingdom (BPI) | Silver | 200,000^{‡} |
^{‡} Sales+streaming figures based on certification alone.

== Release history ==
| Country | Released | Format | Label |
|---|---|---|---|
| Poland | January 17, 2011 | Contemporary hit radio | Sony Music Entertainment |
| Belgium | February 4, 2011 | Digital download | RCA Records |
| Finland | February 4, 2011 | Digital download | RCA Records |
| Germany | February 4, 2011 | Digital download | RCA Records |
| Norway | February 4, 2011 | Digital download | RCA Records |
| Spain | February 4, 2011 | Digital download | RCA Records |
| Sweden | February 4, 2011 | Digital download | RCA Records |
