= Express (Christina Aguilera song) =

Single by Christina Aguilera

from the album Burlesque: Original Motion Picture Soundtrack
- B-side: "Show Me How You Burlesque"
- Released: November 12, 2010
- Recorded: 2009
- Studio: Larrabee Sound Studios (North Hollywood, CA); The Boom Boom Room (Burbank, CA); The Village Recorder (Los Angeles, CA); Triangle Sound Studios (Atlanta, GA)
- Genre: Electropop
- Length: 4:20
- Label: RCA
- Songwriters: Christina Aguilera; C. "Tricky" Stewart; Claude Kelly
- Producers: C. "Tricky" Stewart; Claude Kelly

Christina Aguilera singles chronology
"I Hate Boys" (2010)	"Express" (2010)	"Show Me How You Burlesque" (2010)

Audio video
- "Express" on YouTube

"Express" is a song recorded by American singer Christina Aguilera for the accompanying soundtrack album to her film Burlesque (2010). Written by Aguilera, C. "Tricky" Stewart and Claude Kelly and was produced by Stewart, "Express" is an uptempo electropop number. The track premiered on November 3, 2010 on On Air with Ryan Seacrest to promote the soundtrack. It was also released to Italian radio as a single on November 12, 2010, and to Australian radio on December 6.

"Express" received generally favorable reviews from music critics, who praised its both old-school–and–contemporary sound. It attained moderate chart success, peaking at number two on the US Bubbling Under Hot 100 Singles and also charting in other territories. Aguilera performed the track at the American Music Awards of 2010 and during her Vegas residency Christina Aguilera: The Xperience.

== Background and composition ==
In support of her sixth studio album, Bionic, Aguilera planned to embark on the Bionic Tour. However, on May 24, 2010, the singer and tour promoter Live Nation both posted messages on their websites stating that due to excessive promotion of Bionic and preparing for her upcoming film debut in Burlesque, she felt she would need more time to be able to put together a show that her fans deserve to see. Aguilera stated that this was not possible to do in less than one month between the release of the album and the start of the tour as she would need more time to rehearse. For the accompanying soundtrack for the film, Aguilera worked with Tricky Stewart; he co-wrote and produced two songs, "Show Me How You Burlesque" and "Express", and produced several other tracks including "Something's Got a Hold on Me", "Tough Lover" and "But I Am a Good Girl". "Express" was premiered on the On Air with Ryan Seacrest radio show (KIIS-FM) on November 3, 2010 as a promotional single from the album.

"Express" was written by Aguilera, Christopher Stewart and Claude Kelly, and was produced by Tricky Stewart. Aguilera's vocals on the track span two octaves, from the low-note of E_{3} to the high-note of E_{5}. It is an electropop song; the melody of "Express" is similar to the old-school style of "Lady Marmalade", and has a dance production. Thus, "Express" has an old-school sound, but is also modern. Lyrically, the song evokes sexual theme, as she "seductively" sings, "Show a little leg, you gotta shimmy your chest".

== Reception ==
"Express" received mainly positive reviews from music critics. Eric Henderson of Slant Magazine called the song "nasty, buzzing bump-and-grind" and "a bionic 'Lady Marmalade'". Blogcritics thought that "Express", among with "Show Me How You Burlesque" are the two songs that "work better in the context of the movie, where the elaborate visuals help distract from their lack of melody and strong hooks". An online website, Movie-Moron was positive toward the track, saying that it is "the most modern sounding thing" in the soundtrack, also compared "Express" to Aguilera's 2002 single "Dirrty". Jamie Tabberer of the Attitude magazine named "Express" a "glam big band number", and ranked it among the best songs ever recorded by Aguilera. Julianne MacNeill placed it on a similar list for the First for Women magazine.

Commercially, "Express" charted on several music charts worldwide, despite not being released widely as a single. In the United States, the song peaked at number two on the Bubbling Under Hot 100 Singles chart. In the United Kingdom, "Express" peaked at number 75 on the UK Singles Chart, and also charted on the UK R&B Chart at number 21 on December 25, 2010. On the Swiss Singles Chart, "Express" debuted and peaked at number 54 on January 21, 2011, and stayed there for 3 weeks. In Japan, the track also peaked at number 32, and in Italy it charted at number 91. The song reached number 58 on the Australian Singles Chart on January 24, 2011. MacNeill noted that although "Express" wasn't a big commercial hit on charts, it "did experience a surge in success on TikTok" in the 2020s.

== Live performances ==
To promote "Express" and Burlesque, Aguilera has performed the track on two shows. Aguilera performed "Express" for the first time at the American Music Awards of 2010 on November 21, 2010, held at the Nokia Theatre in Los Angeles, California. During an interview with MTV News about the performance, Aguilera stated that the performance would be "fantastic" and would "give a fitting look inside the movie". Wearing a "black spangly bodysuit" with knee-high boots and a bowler, Aguilera seated in a chair with her back to the audience in the beginning of the show. She began to snap her fingers and leaned into the "jazzy, skittery rhythms" of "Express". Later, the scene revealed a set made up to mimic the backstage at a burlesque club, with the singer surrounded by a number of dancers. Gil Kaufman of MTV News said that the performance is a flash back to the "Dirrty-era" of Aguilera.

On December 11, 2010, Aguilera performed "Express" again on the seventh series of British television singing contest The X Factor. Aguilera's performance, as well as Rihanna's one of "What's My Name?", received criticism for being inappropriate for pre-watershed television. ITV was later exonerated and the performances were deemed to be "at the limit" of acceptability for pre-watershed television. However, Ofcom received about 2,868 complaints about the matter. The song was later included in the setlist for Aguilera's Vegas residency Christina Aguilera: The Xperience, as well as her European/Mexican The X Tour.

== Impact ==
On February 18, 2011, a video featuring a 10-year-old Taiwanese boy dressing in drag and performing a dance number choreographed to "Express", channeling Aguilera's performance of the song in Burlesque, was uploaded to the Internet. The video was met with controversy, with Billboard magazine questioning if "the kid's parents filmed his sexualized dance routine and uploaded it to YouTube". In January 2021, Madison Hubbell and Zachary Donohue won the gold medal at the U.S. Figure Skating Championships. During the 2020–21 season they danced to a medley of Aguilera's Burlesque songs, which included "Express".

== Accolades ==
Year	Ceremony	Category	Result	Ref.
2011	J-Wave Awards	Song of the Year	Nominated	

== Charts ==
Chart (2010–11)	Peak position
Australia (ARIA)	58
Italy (FIMI)	91
Italy Airplay (EarOne)	86
Japan (Japan Hot 100)	32
Japan Adult Contemporary Airplay (Billboard)	8
Swiss Singles Chart	54
UK Singles Chart (OCC)	75
UK R&B Chart (OCC)	21
US Bubbling Under Hot 100 (Billboard)	2

== Release history ==
Country	Released	Format	Label
Italy	November 12, 2010	Contemporary hit radio	RCA Records
Australia	December 6, 2010	Contemporary hit radio	Sony Music Entertainment
