= Burlesque (soundtrack) =

Soundtrack album by Christina Aguilera and Cher
- Released: November 19, 2010
- Length: 31:53
- Labels: Screen Gems, Inc.; RCA
- Producers: Christina Aguilera; Steven Antin; Samuel Dixon; Ron Fair; Matthew Gerrard; Claude Kelly; Steve Lindsey; Linda Perry; The Phantom Boyz; Matt Serletic; C. "Tricky" Stewart; Mark Taylor

Christina Aguilera chronology
Bionic (2010)	Burlesque (2010)	Lotus (2012)

Cher chronology
Gold (2005)	Burlesque (2010)	Icon (2011)

Singles from Burlesque: Original Motion Picture Soundtrack
- 1. "Express" Released: November 12, 2010; 2. "You Haven't Seen the Last of Me" Released: November 24, 2010; 3. "Show Me How You Burlesque" Released: February 4, 2011

Burlesque: Original Motion Picture Soundtrack is the soundtrack album to the film of the same name, released by Screen Gems, Inc and RCA Records on November 19, 2010. The soundtrack consists of ten songs sung by the film's stars, American singers Christina Aguilera and Cher; Aguilera sang eight of the tracks, while Cher performed the remaining two. The album is inspired by jazz music style, in style with Aguilera's fifth studio album Back to Basics (2006), but contrasting to her then-recent release Bionic (2010), which was recorded concurrently with Burlesque. Burlesque served as Cher's first album since the release of Living Proof nine years earlier.

Upon its release, the album received generally favorable reviews from music critics. Cher's song "You Haven't Seen the Last of Me" won a Golden Globe Award for Best Original Song at the 2011 ceremony, and received another nomination in the same category for Aguilera's "Bound to You". The album also received a nomination at the 54th Annual Grammy Awards, for Best Compilation Soundtrack for Visual Media. Commercially, the album was moderately successful, peaking at number eighteen on the U.S. Billboard 200 chart and in the top ten in several other countries, including Australia, Japan, New Zealand and Austria. As of August 2019, the album has sold 779,000 copies in the United States. The soundtrack spawned three promotional singles: "Express" and "Show Me How You Burlesque" by Aguilera, and "You Haven't Seen the Last of Me" by Cher.

== Background ==
In early May 2010, Aguilera announced that she would embark on the supporting concert tour for her sixth studio album, Bionic. However, her management team announced shortly afterwards that the tour was postponed due to Aguilera's promotion for her first feature film, Burlesque (2010), in which she starred alongside Cher. Aguilera reported that she would reschedule the tour in 2011, though the tour never happened.

Burlesque was released in November 2010. The film was met with mixed reviews from critics, who criticized it for being "campy and clichéd", yet praised Aguilera's acting. The accompanying soundtrack, Burlesque: Original Motion Picture Soundtrack, comprises ten songs: eight performed by Aguilera and two performed by Cher. It was Cher's first major release since her compilation Gold in 2005. Producer Tricky Stewart stated that the collaboration with Aguilera on Burlesque soundtrack was "a crazy opportunity different from anything [he]'ve ever done before". Danja was looking forward to working with Aguilera on the soundtrack, however it was not done.

=== "Nasty" ===
During the recording process, Aguilera recorded a song titled "Nasty", which featured guest vocals from CeeLo Green. However, the track was ultimately scrapped due to legal issues concerning sample clearance. The song was passed to multiple other artists, including British singer Pixie Lott. Lott was able to clear the samples, and eventually released the song as the lead single from her self-titled third studio album in 2014. Aguilera's recording was eventually leaked online, and received positive reviews.

== Composition ==
"Express" (performed by Christina Aguilera)
A 26-second sample of "Express", the second single from the soundtrack

Burlesque: Original Motion Picture Soundtrack comprises ten songs: eight performed by Aguilera and two performed by Cher. The soundtrack has a "brassy, jazzy" sound inspired by jazz, in contrast to Aguilera's last electronic music-inspired studio album Bionic (2010) but similar to her fifth 1920s, 1930s and 1940s-influenced studio album Back to Basics (2006).

Four of the songs performed by Aguilera are cover versions, two of Etta James' works: "Something's Got a Hold on Me" and "Tough Lover", a cover version of Mae West's "Guy What Takes His Time", and a dance version of "The Beautiful People" by Marilyn Manson, including the "unmistakable" drum beats and guitar riff in the original version.

The two songs performed by Cher are "Welcome to Burlesque" and "You Haven't Seen the Last of Me". "Welcome to Burlesque" was described as "a 'Cabaret'-style oompah that shows both skill and humor". The power ballad "You Haven't Seen the Last of Me" features Cher's powerful vocals.

The remaining four tracks are original songs performed by Aguilera. "But I Am a Good Girl" "sticks to the sassy swing of a bygone musical era", while "Express" has a similar musical style to Aguilera's previous single "Lady Marmalade". The uptempo number "Show Me How You Burlesque" has a 2010s dance production, but "lack of melody and strong hooks". The power ballad "Bound to You", co-written by Sia, has the same musical style to "You Lost Me" from Bionic, which was also written by Sia and features Aguilera's strong vocal delivery.

== Promotion ==
In August 2010, a video containing a scene from the film featuring Aguilera performing "Something's Got a Hold on Me" was released onto YouTube. Later in early November, a clip featuring Aguilera performing "But I Am a Good Girl" from the movie was also released. On November 17, 2010, Aguilera performed the track "Bound to You" on The Tonight Show with Jay Leno. On November 19, 2010, she performed "Something's Got a Hold on Me" on The Ellen DeGeneres Show.

"Express", performed by Aguilera, was released as the lead single from the album in Italy and Australia; it was serviced to Italian radio on November 12, 2010 and to Australian contemporary hit radio on December 6. Aguilera performed "Express" at the American Music Awards of 2010 on November 21, 2010. The following day, Aguilera performed "Something's Got a Hold on Me" on Conan. On November 23, 2010, Aguilera performed "Show Me How You Burlesque" and "Beautiful" during the season finale of the eleventh season of U.S. television dancing competition Dancing with the Stars.

"You Haven't Seen the Last of Me" (performed by Cher)
A 21-second sample of Burlesques lead single "You Haven't Seen the Last of Me"

On November 24, 2010, Cher's label, Warner Bros. Records, released a digital remix extended play with uptempo dance versions of her song "You Haven't Seen the Last of Me" via iTunes Stores worldwide. On December 7, the same label released the StoneBridge remix version as a standalone digital single. RCA Records serviced the song to American adult contemporary radio on January 15, 2011. "Show Me How You Burlesque", performed by Aguilera, was released as a digital single on February 4, 2011.

== Critical reception ==
Professional ratings
Review scores
Source	Rating
AllMusic	3/5 stars
Billboard	(favorable)
Entertainment Weekly	(B)
Slant Magazine	3/5 stars

Stephen Thomas Erlewine from AllMusic gave the soundtrack three out of five stars, commenting that "some of this stuff is quite good". Slant Magazine's Eric Henderson provided a mixed review, writing that the soundtrack "seems to indicate her efforts are coming from a similarly era-straddling psychological place". Writing for The Oregonian, Mike Russell noted that "Christina Aguilera has magnificent pipes, and if you like hyper-produced, brass-heavy show-pop that winks at the cabaret tradition, you'll probably dig the Burlesque soundtrack", also adding that "every song is engineered to be a blockbuster". Jim Farber from New York Daily News criticized Aguilera for her "vocals offer the same distracting loop-de-loops and showy tics", but complimented Cher that she "balances both aspects ideally". A reviewer from Blogcritics labelled the album a "grab bag of tracks that don't really add up to cohesive album".

Leah Greanblatt from Entertainment Weekly gave the album a "B" score, naming it a "shamelessly diva-fied mix of balladry, Broadway cabaret, and backroom boogie-woogie" and complimented on its musical departure from Aguilera's previous studio album Bionic. In a positive review, Billboard editor Kerri Mason praised Burlesque as "a campy celebration of diva-dom and an over-the-top, triple-threat performance". James Wigney of The Advertiser praised Aguilera's "vocal gymnastics", but was mixed towards Cher's numbers on the soundtrack. The album was also met with a positive review from Diva Devotee, complimented for "strong vocals, brilliant production and evocative songs".

=== Accolades ===
At the 54th Annual Grammy Awards, Burlesque was nominated for Best Compilation Soundtrack for Visual Media. It won the Japan Gold Disc Award for the Soundtrack of the Year. The album was also nominated for the St. Louis Film Critics Association Award in the Best Music category.

== Commercial performance ==
On the US Billboard 200, Burlesque debuted and peaked at number eighteen during the week of November 28, 2010, selling 63,000 copies in its first week. It was certified Gold by the Recording Industry Association of America, having sold 779,000 copies in the US as of September 2014. On the Australian ARIA Albums Chart, the soundtrack peaked at number two and is Aguilera's second highest-charting album after Back to Basics (2006). It was certified Platinum by the Australian Recording Industry Association in 2015 for selling over 70,000 copies. In New Zealand, it peaked at number five on the Official New Zealand Music Chart in January 2011 and was certified Platinum in 2022. Burlesque peaked at number 16 on the Canadian Albums Chart and was certified gold by the Music Canada for shipments of 40,000 units in the region. The soundtrack also gained commercial success on several record charts: peaking at number five in Austria, number seven in Venezuela, and number eight in Switzerland. In Japan, it peaked at number two of the Western Albums chart compiled by Oricon. Burlesque also reached number one of the Taiwanese Albums Chart, as reported by Five Music in January 2011.

== Track listing ==
All songs performed by Christina Aguilera except where noted.

Burlesque: Original Motion Picture Soundtrack
No.	Title	Writer(s)	Producer(s)	Length
1.	"Something's Got a Hold on Me"	Etta James; Leroy Kirkland; Pearl Woods	C. "Tricky" Stewart	3:04
2.	"Welcome to Burlesque" (performed by Cher)	Charlie Midnight; Matthew Gerrard; Steve Lindsey; John Patrick Shanley	Lindsey; Gerrard; Mark Taylor^{[a]}	2:46
3.	"Tough Lover"	James; Joe Josea	Stewart	2:00
4.	"But I Am a Good Girl"	Jacques Morali; Alain Bernardini	Stewart	2:29
5.	"Guy What Takes His Time"	Ralph Rainger	Linda Perry	2:43
6.	"Express"	Aguilera; Stewart; Claude Kelly	Stewart; Kelly^{[a]}	4:20
7.	"You Haven't Seen the Last of Me" (performed by Cher)	Diane Warren	Matt Serletic; Taylor^{[a]}	3:30
8.	"Bound to You"	Aguilera; Samuel Dixon; Sia Furler	Dixon	4:23
9.	"Show Me How You Burlesque"	Aguilera; Stewart; Kelly	Stewart; Kelly^{[a]}	2:59
10.	"The Beautiful People (from Burlesque)"	Ron Fair; Ester Dean; Stefanie Ridel; Tommy Lee James; Nicole Scherzinger; Laura Pergolizzi; Melvin K. Watson; Larry Summerville Jr.; Marilyn Manson; Twiggy Ramirez	Fair; The Phantom Boyz; Aguilera^{[a]}	3:31
Total length:				31:53

Other songs are not included in the soundtrack

- "Forever Young" by Alphaville
- "More Than a Feeling" by Boston
- "Bound to You" by Cam Gigandet (uncredited)
- "Curly's Blue's" by Chris Phillips and the Squirrel Nut Zippers Orchestra
- "Don't Touch" by Chris Phillips and the Fireside Orchestra
- "My Drag" by the Squirrel Nut Zippers Orchestra
- "Poor Boys Blues" by Chris Phillips and the Squirrel Nut Zippers Orchestra
- "Sitty Pretty" by Chris Phillips and Squirrel Nut Zippers Orchestra
- "Suits Are Picking Up the Bill" by Chris Phillips and Squirrel Nut Zippers Orchestra
- "That Fascinating Thing" by Chris Phillips and Squirrel Nut Zippers Orchestra
- "Verdi Mart Shuffle" by Chris Phillips and Squirrel Nut Zippers Orchestra
- "Welcome to Burlesque" (Tango) by Chris Phillips and The Blasting Company Orchestra
- "Nasty Naughty Boy" by Christina Aguilera
- "Hot Stuff" by Donna Summer
- "Tough Lover" by Etta James
- "Knock You Down" by Keri Hilson
- "Ray of Light" by Madonna
- "Diamonds Are a Girl's Best Friend" (Swing Cats Mix) by Marilyn Monroe and Jane Russell; The outro is sung by Christina Aguilera in the film
- "Fade into You" by Mazzy Star
- "Long John Blues" by Megan Mullally
- "Makin' Plans" by Miranda Lambert
- "I Melt With You" by Modern English
- "Animal" by Neon Trees
- "Danke Schoen" by Wayne Newton
- "Black Bottom Stomp" by Wynton Marsalis
- "New Orleans Bump" by Wynton Marsalis

== Personnel ==
Credits adapted from AllMusic.

- Christina Aguilera – vocal arrangement, vocal producer
- Cher – vocals
- Jess Collins – background vocals
- Gene Cipriano – tenor saxophone
- Lauren Chipman – viola
- Daphne Chen – violin
- Andrew Chavez – Pro-Tools
- Chris Chaney – bass
- Alejandro Carballo – trombone
- Frank Capp – castanets
- Jebin Bruni – piano
- Richard Brown – Pro-Tools
- Eddie Brown – piano
- Felix Bloxsom – drums
- Stevie Blacke – cello, viola, violin
- Charlie Bisharat – violin
- Robert Bacon – guitar
- Spring Aspers – executive in charge of music
- Keith Armstrong – mixing assistant
- Alex Arias – assistant, engineer, Pro-Tools
- Steven Antin – executive soundtrack producer
- Alex Al – acoustic bass
- Thomas Aiezza – assistant engineer
- Andrew Wuepper – engineer, horn engineer, percussion engineer
- Ben Wendell – saxophone
- Roy Weigand – trumpet
- Eric Weaver – assistant
- Ian Walker – contrabass
- Lia Vollack – executive in charge of music
- Gabe Veltri – engineer
- Rich King vocal producer
- Stephen Vaughan – photography
- Doug Trantow – engineer, Pro-Tools
- Brad Townsend – mixing
- Pat Thrall – engineer
- Brian "B-Luv" Thomas – engineer, horn engineer, percussion engineer
- Chris Tedesco – contracting
- Mark Taylor – vocal producer
- C. "Tricky" Stewart – producer, vocal producer
- Eric Spring – engineer
- Josh Freese – drums
- Ron Fair – arranger, producer, vocal arrangement, vocal producer
- Peter Erskine – drums
- Ron Dziubla – baritone sax
- George Doering – guitar
- Richard Dodd – cello
- Mark Dobson – engineer
- Samuel Dixon – percussion, producer, programming
- Buck Damon – music supervisor
- Jim Cox – horn arrangements, piano
- Pablo Correa – percussion
- Randy Urbanski – Assistant mix engineer, engineer
- Arturo Solar – trumpet
- Joel Shearer – guitar
- Gus Seyffert – acoustic bass, electric bass, baritone guitar
- Matt Serletic – arranger, keyboards, producer, programming
- The Section Quartet – strings
- Andrew Schubert – mixing
- John Salvatore Scaglione – guitar
- Oscar Ramirez – engineer, vocal engineer
- Christian Plata – assistant
- Phantom Boyz – arranger, keyboards, producer, programming
- Linda Perry – engineer, producer
- Gordon Peeke – drums, percussion
- Paul III – acoustic bass
- Ray Parker Jr. – guitar
- Mimi Parker – assistant
- 'Lil' Tal Ozz – assistant
- Geoff Nudell – clarinet
- Michael Neuble – drums
- Luis Navarro – assistant
- Jamie Muhoberac – keyboards
- Dean Mora – horn arrangements, transcription
- Peter Mokran – mixing
- Jim McMillen – trombone
- Andy Martin – trombone
- Manny Marroquin – mixing
- Chris Lord-Alge – mixing
- Steve Lindsey – producer
- Mike Leisz – assistant
- Juan Manuel Leguizamón – percussion
- Greg Kurstin – piano
- Oliver Kraus – string arrangements, string engineer, strings
- James King – saxophone
- Claude Kelly – vocal producer
- Rick Keller – alto sax
- Nik Karpen – mixing assistant
- Alan Kaplan – trumpet
- Jaycen Joshua – mixing
- Graham Hope – assistant
- Mark Hollingsworth – tenor sax
- Dan Higgins – clarinet, baritone sax
- Tal Herzberg – engineer, Pro-Tools
- Trey Henry – bass
- Erwin Gorostiza – art direction, design
- Eric Gorfain – string arrangements, violin
- Matthew Gerrard – producer
- Jesus Garnica – assistant
- Brian Gardner – mastering
- Chris Galland – assistant
- James Gadson – drums

== Charts ==
=== Weekly charts ===
Chart (2010–11)	Peak position
Australian Albums (ARIA)	2
Australian Digital Albums (ARIA)	1
Austrian Albums (Ö3 Austria)	5
Belgian Albums (Ultratop Flanders)	86
Canadian Albums (Billboard)	16
Czech Albums (ČNS IFPI)	29
Danish Albums (Hitlisten)	38
Dutch Albums (Album Top 100)	78
French Albums (SNEP)	108
German Albums (Offizielle Top 100)	12
Greek Albums (IFPI Greece)	44
Italian Albums (FIMI)	14
Japanese Western Albums (Oricon)	2
Mexican Albums (Top 100 Mexico)	11
New Zealand Albums (RMNZ)	5
Poland (ZPAV)	15
Spanish Albums (Promusicae)	69
Swiss Albums (Schweizer Hitparade)	8
Taiwanese Albums (Five Music)	1
UK Compilation Albums (Official Charts)	27
US Billboard 200	18
US Digital Albums (Billboard)	4
US Soundtrack Albums (Billboard)	1
Venezuelan Albums (Recordland)	7
Chart (2015)	Peak position
UK Soundtrack Albums (OCC)	9

=== Year-end charts ===
Chart (2011)	Position
Australian Albums (ARIA)	44
New Zealand Albums (RMNZ)	44
Swiss Albums (Schweizer Hitparade)	92
US Billboard 200	53
US Soundtracks Albums (Billboard)	3

Chart (2012)	Position
US Soundtrack Albums (Billboard)	19

== Certifications and sales ==
Region	Certification	Certified units/sales
Australia (ARIA)	Platinum	70,000^{^}
Canada (Music Canada)	Gold	40,000^{^}
Germany (BVMI)	Gold	100,000^{‡}
Japan (RIAJ)	Gold	100,000^{^}
New Zealand (RMNZ)	Platinum	15,000^{‡}
Taiwan	—	20,000
United Kingdom (BPI)	Gold	100,000^{‡}
United States (RIAA)	Gold	779,000
^{^} Shipments figures based on certification alone.^{‡} Sales+streaming figures based on certification alone.

== Release history ==
Region	Date	Format	Label
Belgium	November 19, 2010	Digital download	Screen Gems, Inc.
France	November 19, 2010	Digital download	Screen Gems, Inc.
Germany	November 19, 2010	Digital download	Screen Gems, Inc.
Norway	November 19, 2010	Digital download	Screen Gems, Inc.
Portugal	November 19, 2010	Digital download	Screen Gems, Inc.
Spain	November 19, 2010	Digital download	Screen Gems, Inc.
United Kingdom	November 19, 2010	Digital download	Screen Gems, Inc.
United States	November 19, 2010	Digital download	Screen Gems, Inc.
Germany	November 19, 2010	CD	RCA
United Kingdom	November 22, 2010	CD	RCA
United States	November 22, 2010	CD	RCA
Japan	December 8, 2010	CD	RCA

Notes

- ^{^[a]} denotes vocal producer
