= I Hate Boys =

Single by Christina Aguilera

from the album Bionic
- Released: September 3, 2010
- Recorded: 2010
- Studio: No Excuses (Los Angeles); The Red Lips Room (Beverly Hills)
- Genre: Glam rock; pop rock; electropop
- Length: 2:24
- Label: RCA
- Songwriters: Christina Aguilera; Jamal Jones; Ester Dean; William Tyler; Bill Wellings; J. J. Hunter
- Producers: Polow da Don; Claude Kelly; Anomaly

Christina Aguilera singles chronology
"You Lost Me" (2010)	"I Hate Boys" (2010)	"Express" (2010)

Audio video
- "I Hate Boys" on YouTube

"I Hate Boys" is a song recorded by American singer Christina Aguilera for her sixth studio album, Bionic (2010). The song was written by Aguilera, Ester Dean, William Tyler, Bill Wellings, J. J. Hunter and Jamal Jones, who also handled the production of the track. "I Hate Boys" is a glam rock, pop rock and electropop song, containing elements of urban pop and synth-pop. Lyrically, it is a hate-driven song about ridiculing all boys.

"I Hate Boys" was released as the second and final single from Bionic in New Zealand and Australia. It was serviced to Australian radio on June 28, 2010, and released as a digital single in Australia and New Zealand on September 3. The song divided music critics; while some called it fun and a "girl anthem", others felt its lyrics were too juvenile and regarded it as filler. Upon the release of Bionic, "I Hate Boys" debuted at number 51 on the Gaon International Singles Chart during the week of June 6, 2010.

== Background and release ==
Initially, "I Hate Boys" was supposed to be produced by Le Tigre. Group member Johanna Fateman wrote about working with Aguilera on their official website:

... While the giant sound of her stacked vocals and the pop sheen she lends to the tracks might seem at odds with Le Tigre's aesthetic roots, it really works. The songs have a lot of elements we're known for, like a garage guitar sound, schoolyard chants, new wave-y synths, electro beats, and somehow it all sounds crazily right with Christina's unbelievable voice.

However, it was later revealed that the song was produced by Polow da Don and that Le Tigre only produced the song "My Girls". Polow da Don talked about working with Aguilera in a Billboard interview, stating: "There's two things you need to know about Christina Aguilera: The first is that, as far as her singing goes, she's a professionally trained animal. And the other is that she knows exactly, absolutely what she wants."

After "Not Myself Tonight", the song was released as the second single of the album in Australia and New Zealand. A digital single was released on the iTunes Store on September 3, 2010. It reached number twenty-eight on the Australian Airplay Chart.

== Composition ==
"I Hate Boys" was written by Aguilera, Jamal Jones, Ester Dean, William Tyler, Bill Wellings and J. J. Hunter, while production was handled by William Tyler & Polow da Don. Don has worked with Aguilera on the previous singles "Not Myself Tonight" and "Woohoo". "I Hate Boys" contains a sample from the 1973 track "Jungle Juice", by UK electronic act Elektrik Cokernut from their album Go Moog!. It is an uptempo glam rock, pop and electropop song with elements of synth-pop and urban pop, featuring gang chants in the background. Lyrically, "I Hate Boys" is a hate-driven song about ridiculing and insulting all bad boys. It begins with a drum beat similar to Katy Perry's "I Kissed a Girl" (2008), according to Idolator's Becky Bain, who also wrote that "it sounds almost directly inspired by the trash-talk obnoxiousness found in Avril Lavigne's "Girlfriend."

== Critical reception ==
"I Hate Boys" received mixed reviews from music critics. In a positive review, Leslie Simon of MTV Buzzworthy wrote that the track is "a fun, highly synth-pop gum-smacking, girls-night-out rally anthem." Melinda Newman of HitFix called it a "pure pop infectious silliness." Mesfin Fekadu from The Boston Globe praised the song, writing, "The male-bashing 'I Hate Boys' has the right mix of energy and sass that Aguilera somewhat lacks throughout the album." The Scotsman wrote that the song is an "electro glam" that has "throwaway fun." Allison Stewart from The Washington Post referred to it as a "tame, hand-clappy pop song" and compared the track to Gwen Stefani's songs. Writing for Canadian music magazine Cokemachineglow, Lindsay Zoladz applauded the song for its "bombastic percussions".

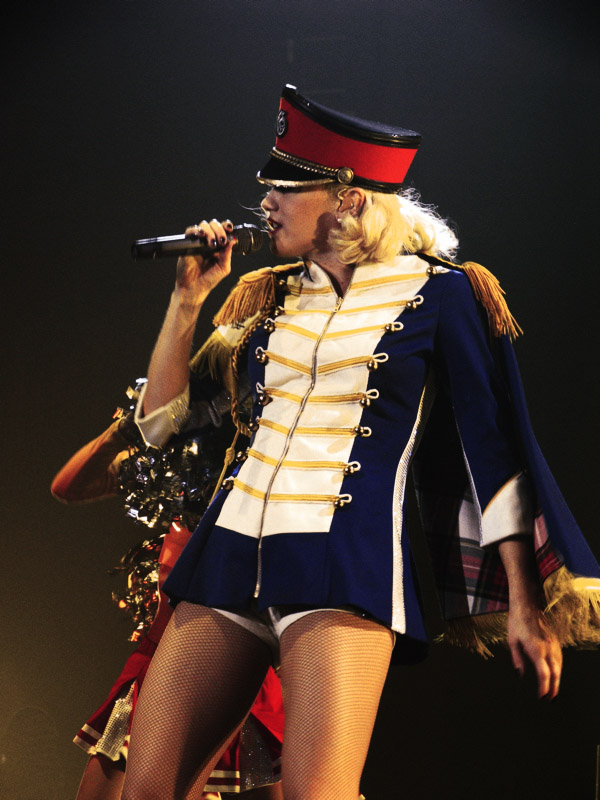
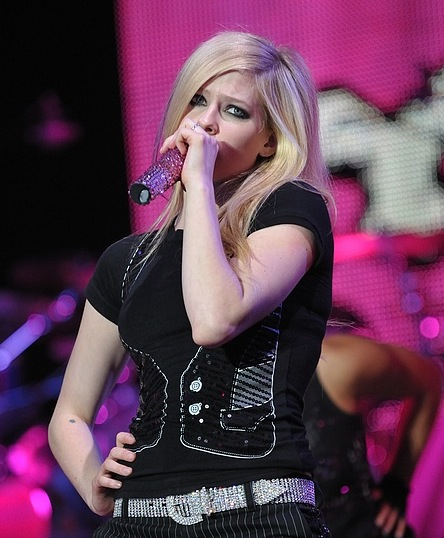
Music critics found the song reminiscent of Gwen Stefani's "Hollaback Girl" (left) and Avril Lavigne's "Girlfriend" (right).

TJ of Neon Limelight gave a mixed review, calling it "sassy" but "would work better for an artist at least a decade younger than Aguilera", with its "painfully adolescent lyrics". Becky Bain of Idolator wrote, "It's one of those pandering songs that will no doubt have young girls singing along, particularly the chorus, but it's a lazy one that leaves rubs us the wrong way." Bradley Stern from MuuMuse named it a "filler, including the noisy, childish chant." Greg Kot of the Chicago Tribune commented that "it's the kind of trite glitter-disco might've dispensed", while comparing it to Spice Girls' songs. Eric Henderson gave to the song a negative review, writing, "Considering 'I Hate Boys' is closer than I ever thought Christina would ever come to recording a Daphne Aguilera track, it's ironically also one of many tracks on Bionic that sound tailor-made to accompany the opening credits of Johnny Weir's forthcoming reality show."

In his retrospective commentary on Bionic, Daniel Megarry of the Gay Times called "I Hate Boys" a tongue-in-cheek post-breakup anthem—a "cult favourite moment" on the album.

== Track listing ==
Digital download

1. "I Hate Boys" – 2:24
2. "Not Myself Tonight" (Laidback Luke Radio Edit) – 3:39

== Credits and personnel ==
Recording locations

- Recording – No Excuses, Los Angeles, California
- Vocal recording – The Red Lips Room, Beverly Hills, California

Personnel

- Songwriting – Christina Aguilera, Jamal Jones, Ester Dean, William Tyler, Bill Wellings, J. J. Hunter
- Production – Polow da Don
- Mixing – Jaycen Joshua

== Charts ==
Chart (2010)	Peak position
Australia Airplay (ARIA)	28
South Korea International (Gaon Download Chart)	51

== Release history ==
"I Hate Boys" release history
Region	Date	Format	Label	Ref.
Australia	September 3, 2010	Digital download		RCA
New Zealand	September 3, 2010	Digital download		RCA
