= Bionic (Christina Aguilera song) =

Song by Christina Aguilera

from the album Bionic
- Released: June 4, 2010
- Recorded: 2009
- Studio: Dubsided (Los Angeles, CA); Dreamland Studios (Philadelphia, PA); Mad Decent Mausoleum (Philadelphia, PA); The Red Lips Room (Beverly Hills, CA)
- Genre: Electronic; retro-electro
- Length: 3:21
- Label: RCA
- Songwriters: Christina Aguilera; John Hill; Dave Taylor; Kalenna Harper
- Producers: John Hill; Switch

Licensed audio
- "Bionic" on YouTube

"Bionic" is a song recorded by American singer Christina Aguilera, taken from her sixth studio album of the same name (2010). The song was written by Aguilera, Kalenna Harper, John Hill and Switch, while production was done by the latter two. "Bionic" is an electronic number and has garnered comparisons to works by artists including Santigold and Janet Jackson.

The track received mostly positive reviews, and was listed as the ninth best song of 2010 by The Village Voice's Andrew Stout. Aguilera performed "Bionic" as an introduction to "Not Myself Tonight" on a number of occasions, including the 2010 MTV Movie Awards, The Today Show and VH1 Storytellers. Upon the release of Bionic, the song peaked on the US Billboard Hot 100 at number 66, and on the Korean Gaon International Download Chart at number 23.

== Background and recording ==
After the birth of her son, Aguilera stated in an interview with Ryan Seacrest that her forthcoming album would include a totally new aspect of herself as an artist, because of the pregnancy with her son. During an interview with People in 2008, Aguilera stated that she was going to start recording new material for her forthcoming album at her home in Beverly Hills. On the album, entitled Bionic, Aguilera was inspired by electronic and electronica music, which she heard a lot during her pregnancy.

Aguilera also commented about the album during an interview with Ryan Seacrest, "It's really a fun, fun record. Really futuristic. I was inspired by a lot of electronic music, electronic artists, and so you'll hear all those elements". She added, "[There are] different textures and things with my voice that I was really playing around with and having fun with on this record that I never even knew I could do, vocally". "Bionic" was recorded at three places: Dubsided recording studio in Los Angeles, California, Dreamland Studios and Mad Decent Mausoleum in Philadelphia. Aguilera's vocals were recorded at The Red Lips Room in Beverly Hills, California. The track was written by Aguilera, Kalenna Harper, John Hill and Switch. Hill and Switch also produced and provided musical instruments to "Bionic".

== Composition and critical reception ==
"Bionic" (2010)
A 15 second sample of "Bionic".

"Bionic" is an electronic song and lasts for a duration of 3:21 (three minutes and twenty-one seconds). It features "twitchy space-ace" rhythms, rapping verses and talks about an "echo-laden" invitation to "jet off to the new millennium". In the middle of the song, Aguilera spells out her name, "X-x-x-t-t-t-i-i-i-n-n-n-n-n-a". During the chorus, she sings, "Bionic, so damn Bionic, gonna get you with my electronic supersonic rocket, ay".

Billboard declared "Bionic" to be "dub-tastic", and AllMusic's Stephen Thomas Erlewine applauded the song for its "future shock" quality. Michael Cragg from musicOMH wrote that the song "sounds just like a Santigold track, which is no bad thing". PopMatters critic Omar Kholeif simply described the track as "a thumping" number, while Melinda Newman of HitFix deemed it "a futuristic song, with interesting beats". Newman also compared "Bionic" to Janet Jackson's "Rhythm Nation", "but not nearly as captivating". Entertainment-related website Tan's Topic wrote that the song has "an almost camp sci-fi vibe". "Bionic" was ranked in the annual Pazz & Jop critics poll of the year's best in music. The Village Voice editor Andrew Stout placed it at number nine on his list of 2010's best songs (while another Bionic track, "Elastic Love", was listed at number two). Glamour ranked Aguilera's song on its "66 Best Halloween Songs" list, noting: "'Bionic' isn't necessarily 'scary' [...], but it is cold, robotic, and experimental."

== Live performances ==
On June 6, 2010, Aguilera performed "Bionic" for the first time at the 2010 MTV Movie Awards, held at Gibson Amphitheatre in Los Angeles, California. There, she sang the track as the introduction to "Not Myself Tonight" and "Woohoo". During the performance of "Bionic", she sported curly platinum hair and was dressed in a "diamond-encrusted one-piece" while sitting on a "gilded throne". Caryn Ganz from Rolling Stone opined that the way Aguilera began the performance was similar to Madonna during the latter's Sticky & Sweet Tour (2008–09). Then, Aguilera walked on the stage and "leather-clad" back-up dancers in silver and black outfits began to perform a dance routine. The performance was met with mainly negative reviews and failed to gain impact from media outlets. Tamar Anitai for MTV Buzzworthy was not impressed toward her performance, summarizing it "was all about her "I-I'm-still-a-diva" vocals, frenzied stage show, and adult-only innuendo... And then this happened". In a positive view, James Montgomery for MTV News praised her looking as "a 23rd-century queen" and the show "got millions of people all hot and bothered".

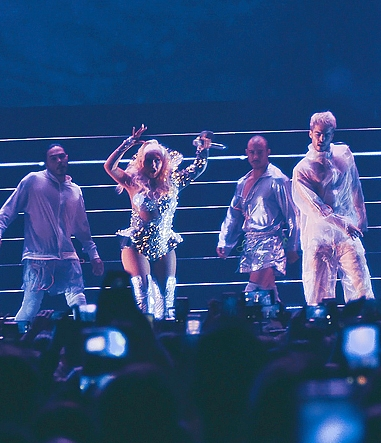
Aguilera during The X Tour in 2019. The songs "Bionic" and "Your Body" were selected as the show's opening tracks.

On June 8, 2010, Aguilera performed "Bionic" as the introduction to "Not Myself Tonight" on The Today Show, along with "Beautiful", "Fighter" and "You Lost Me". Selected as the opener of the show, she performed in her "hinestone tights" and "red hot pants". Following the highly criticized performance at the 2010 MTV Movie Awards, Aguilera's performance at The Today Show was well received by most critics. James Dinh for MTV News named it "aggressive", while Erika Brooks Adickman for Idolator called the performance a "hot-mess show wardrobe". Simon Vozick-Levinson for Entertainment Weekly, however was mixed towards the "Bionic" and "Not Myself Tonight" part. He wrote that the two songs aren't "memorable", yet praising her vocals: "definitely better voice than she was". Aguilera also appeared on music television series VH1 Storytellers and sang "Bionic" and "Not Myself Tonight", with "Beautiful" as the follow-up. The singer's performances during the show were later aired on June 13, 2010.

Aguilera performed "Bionic" on numerous occasions throughout the years, including at a concert in Kuala Lumpur in 2014, during her set at the 15th edition of Mawazine Festival in May 2016, and at the Black Sea Arena in Georgia in July 2016. She also sang "Bionic" during her 2018 stage comeback, The Liberation Tour. In 2019, the track was included in the setlist for Aguilera's Vegas residency The Xperience. The same year "Bionic" was selected as a show opener for the singer's X Tour in Europe.

== Credits and personnel ==
Recording locations

- Recording – Dubsided, Los Angeles; Dreamland Studios, Philadelphia; Mad Decent Mausoleum, Philadelphia
- Vocal recording – The Red Lips Room, Beverly Hills, California.

Personnel

- Songwriting – Christina Aguilera, John Hill, Switch, Kalenna Harper
- Production – John Hill, Switch
- All instruments – John Hill, Switch

Credits adapted from the liner notes of Bionic, RCA Records.

== Chart performance ==
Following the release of Bionic, the song debuted on two national charts due to strong digital download sales. In South Korea, it debuted on the International Singles Chart at number 23 during the week of July 13 to 19, 2010. In the United States, "Bionic" debuted at number 40 on the Billboard Hot Digital Songs chart for and remained on the chart for one week. It subsequently peaked at number 66 on the US Billboard Hot 100 chart.

Chart (2010)	Peak position
South Korea (Gaon)	23
US Billboard Hot 100	66
