= Bionic (Christina Aguilera album) =

2010 studio album by Christina Aguilera

Studio album by Christina Aguilera
- Released: June 4, 2010
- Recorded: 2008–2010
- Studios: Kung Fu Garden; The Bank; The Boom Boom Room (Burbank); The Red Lips Room (Beverly Hills); Dubsided; Larrabee; No Excuses; Record Plant (Los Angeles); Dreamland (Hurley); Mr. Dan's (London); Mad Decent Mausoleum (Philadelphia)
- Genres: Electropop; futurepop; R&B
- Length: 59:27
- Label: RCA
- Producers: Ester Dean; Samuel Dixon; Focus...; John Hill; Ladytron; Le Tigre; Linda Perry; Polow da Don; Switch; C. "Tricky" Stewart

Christina Aguilera chronology
Keeps Gettin' Better: A Decade of Hits (2008)	Bionic (2010)	Burlesque (2010)

Singles from Bionic
- 1. "Not Myself Tonight" Released: April 2, 2010; 2. "Woohoo" Released: May 25, 2010; 3. "You Lost Me" Released: June 25, 2010; 4. "I Hate Boys" Released: September 3, 2010

Bionic is the sixth studio album by American singer Christina Aguilera. It was released on June 4, 2010, by RCA Records. Inspired by Aguilera's taste for electronic music, Bionic is characterized as an electropop, futurepop and R&B record. Its first half consists of electronic songs incorporating synthesizers and electronic beats, while the second half displays a balladic production. The album's main themes include sex and feminism.

Bionic initially received mixed reviews from music critics, although in retrospective commentary multiple professional journalists noted it has gained a cult following. Commercially, the record charted at number one in Greece, Taiwan, and the United Kingdom while reaching the top five within Australia, Austria, Belgium, Canada, the Czech Republic, Ireland, Russia, Scotland, Spain, Switzerland, and the United States. It has received gold certifications from Australia, Austria, Brazil, Greece, and the United States.

Bionic spawned four singles: "Not Myself Tonight", "Woohoo", "You Lost Me", and "I Hate Boys". The album was promoted in mid-2010 by television performances, such as Aguilera's appearances on The Oprah Winfrey Show, the ninth season of American Idol, Today and MTV Movie Awards. Its concert tour, the Bionic Tour, was initially planned to support Bionic, but was ultimately canceled due to Aguilera's heavy promotional schedule for the album and then-upcoming film Burlesque (2010).

== Background and development ==
"With this new album, I wanted to go in a completely opposite direction – a very futuristic, robotic sound and computer-sounding vocals. I'm experimenting with my voice in ways I've never done before, almost like a technical, computer-generated sound, which is different for me because I'm the type of vocalist that just belts. I'm always inspired by new things because I get bored."

— Aguilera, about Bionic

After a successful 2006, during which Aguilera released her critically acclaimed and commercially successful fifth studio album Back to Basics, Aguilera received a nomination for a Grammy Award for Best Pop Vocal Album at the 49th Annual Grammy Awards (2007) and won Best Female Pop Vocal Performance for its lead single "Ain't No Other Man". While on the Asian leg of the Back to Basics Tour, during the summer of 2007, Aguilera said that her upcoming album would be "short, sweet and completely different" from its predecessor. After the birth of her son Max, Aguilera stated in an interview with Ryan Seacrest that her forthcoming album would include a completely new aspect of herself as an artist, because of the pregnancy with her son. In a February 2008 interview with People, Aguilera stated that she was going to start recording new material for her forthcoming album at her Beverly Hills, California residence. DJ Premier, who, at the time, was working on projects for his record label Year Round Records, shared plans to head back into the studio with Aguilera, and stated: "She's doing an all pop album again, but she wants me to keep the tone like what we did before. She's ready to start next month." Linda Perry, who had previously worked with Aguilera was to be included in the project too. In an interview with Billboard in October 2008, Aguilera said that the album would be mostly produced by Perry.

During the initial recording sessions, Aguilera released her first greatest hits album Keeps Gettin' Better: A Decade of Hits (2008), which featured two new songs that were derived from electronic music, and she announced that the compilation was in the vein of where the upcoming album was going to go, which was a very futuristic approach to music. "I get off on working with creative energy", she said, and added: "That's when I'm most at home and feel happiest. And all these people brought about new sides of me. It was a big collaboration-fest, and it felt so good and rewarding in the end, because I was just so happy with the work and the new territories that I ventured out to." Aguilera also remarked that her son inspired her to experiment in ways "that maybe I've been afraid to do in the past, to allow myself to go to a place of 'less singing'". She mentioned it "is just about the future" with Max "motivating me to want to play and have fun."

== Recording and production ==
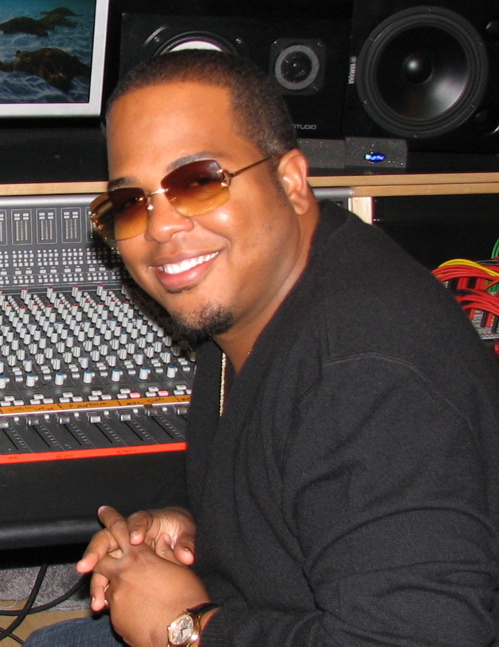
Tricky Stewart produced three songs on Bionic

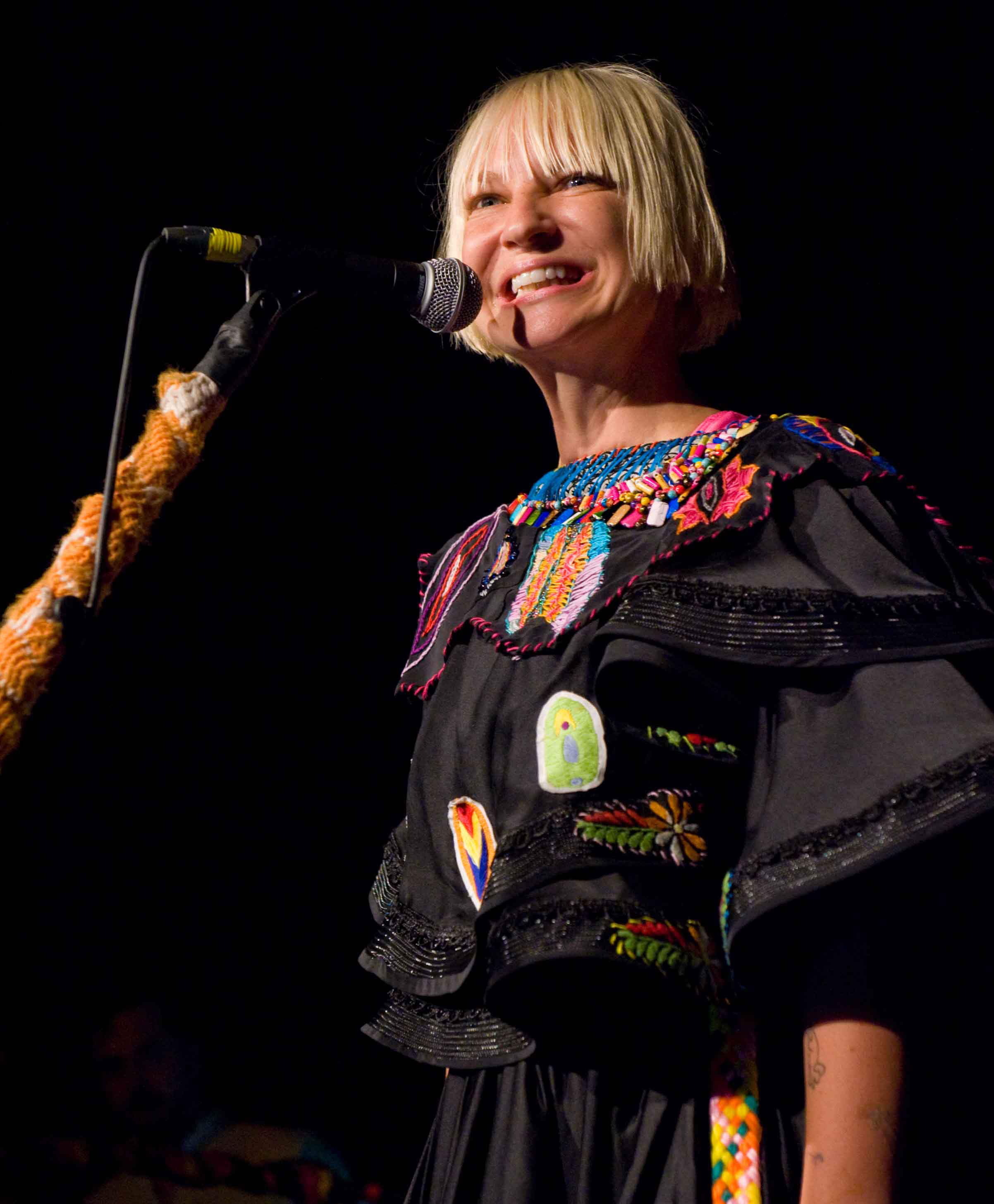
Sia co-wrote and vocally produced three songs on Bionic

Aguilera set about contacting collaborators on her own accord, at the behest of then-husband Jordan Bratman, without relying on the record label A&R. She stated: "Going into [each of these partnerships], I said, 'I'm a really big fan of yours, and I'm interested in stepping into your world and what you do'", adding: "'I want to combine that with my sound, and let's see what happens.' I feel like I can do so much with my voice. I would be so bored sitting on a stool singing ballad after ballad just because I can." Australian singer-songwriter Sia and her collaborator Samuel Dixon worked with Aguilera on a number of tracks for the album. Aguilera told Billboard that she was a big fan of Sia and thrilled to learn Sia wanted to work with her as well. They recorded together at a studio in January 2009, and, according to Sia's blog, wrote four songs together during the sessions. Sia heard the album — or at least some songs recorded for it — as early as April 2009, which she revealed on Twitter.

Members of British electronic band Ladytron, Daniel Hunt and Reuben Wu, went to Los Angeles to meet Aguilera in December 2008 after hearing that they were one of her favorite bands. During the meeting, Aguilera identified what kind of Ladytron songs she liked, with Hunt later saying: "We were impressed because she had a real deep knowledge of our music – album tracks, not just the singles!". The band stated: "We went in with no expectations; the whole thing was a massive surprise. But it was incredible. She was so musically talented, a vocalist who really knows her voice. The first takes sounded really amazing, and while we'd made demos, it was only when her voice was on them that it all came to life." They finished working with Aguilera in March 2009 and produced four or five songs, but only three made the final cut. Two songs produced by the band – "Birds of Prey" and "Little Dreamer" – appeared on the deluxe edition of the album. Meanwhile, the third song "Kimono Girl" did not make the final cut, although it has been highly anticipated by fans. To celebrate the album's tenth anniversary, Aguilera released "Little Dreamer" onto streaming platforms in June 2020. British duo Goldfrapp said in a January 2010 interview that they did not finish the studio sessions and did not know whether their songs would make the final cut.

The Australian said that the production team The Neptunes were to work with Aguilera on the album. In an interview with HitQuarters, Dr. Dre protege Focus... said: "We did a song and an interlude together." He produced the beats for "Sex for Breakfast", which were then worked on by Aguilera and producer Noel "Detail" Fisher. Focus... got involved with the project because he and Aguilera share a loyal and longtime engineer Oscar Ramirez; Ramirez suggested and arranged the pairing. Focus... commented about the experience: "[Aguilera] knows exactly what she is looking for and is not afraid to tell you. It was the first project I've ever worked on where someone sent me examples and showed me exact parts in the song they were looking for." Aguilera announced on her E! television special that she was going to be working with American dance-punk band Le Tigre.

In August 2009, Aguilera said that she co-wrote tracks with British Tamil rapper and singer–songwriter M.I.A. and American singer Santigold, and according to American producer Tricky Stewart, Flo Rida would be featured on the album. Producer Polow da Don, who produced two of the four singles released from the project, was the only producer to be suggested by RCA Records and not contacted by Aguilera personally. Additionally, Stewart and Claude Kelly wrote the song "Glam", which was described as "a hard club song that's about high fashion. It's really for the ladies about getting dressed and looking your best, working it in the club and getting glam and sexy before you go out. ... It will surprise people. I'm calling it a modern day 'Vogue.' I wouldn't say it unless I believed it." Kelly also co-wrote three other tracks for the album, including the first two singles "Not Myself Tonight" and "Woohoo". He described the four tracks as being "up-tempo and fun, they're party anthems but at the same time have underlying messages." Commenting on the experience of working with Aguilera, Kelly said: "What people don't know about her is that she's actually a really good writer. She has good ideas, good melodies, good concepts ... She's really involved from the very beginning to the very end."

== Composition ==
=== Music and lyrics ===
"The whole album sums up my way of seeing life well, it is full of vocal experiments that I enjoyed exploring."

— Aguilera's interview for L'Officiel

Bionic is musically inspired by Aguilera's taste of electronic subgenres, including electronica. The album was mostly described as futurepop, while Andy Gill of The Independent noted the hybrid of electro and R&B on the project, and The New York Times's Alex Hagwood characterized it as an electropop album. Bionic consists of eighteen tracks on the standard edition, and twenty-three on the deluxe edition. The standard edition consists mostly of electropop songs, heavily incorporating synthesizers and electronic beats. Mike Usinger from The Georgia Straight opined that the accompaniment of synthesizers on the project "offers up a rise-of-the-fembots strain of robo-pop that sounds like LCD Soundsystem-era Williamsburg." A few tracks are done up with Auto-Tune. Multiple music critics recognized sex as the main theme of Bionic. Eric Handerson of Slant elaborated that the album "[is] all in service of routine pop sex, the sort of standard-issue sleaze that [...] stood in stark contrast against." Echoing Handerson's point of view, The Georgia Straight's Mike Usinger commented: "Where past Xtina efforts have hinted that's she's horny to the core, Bionic makes a concrete case that she's the dirtiest girl working in mainstream pop." Bionic also displays feminism as a prominent theme; Kitty Empire from The Observer labelled Bionic a "cranking post-feminist party album". In June 2020, Aguilera stated that Bionic is "all about being unabashedly YOU".

=== Songs ===
The album's title song "Bionic" serves as its opening. It is an electronic track, featuring tribal house drums, Morse code riffs, and synthesizers. "Not Myself Tonight" takes influence from tribal house and incorporates synthesizers, pulsing basslines, and house drums in its instrumentation. On the song, Aguilera explicitly announces her new persona and style adopted on Bionic, declaring that "The old me's gone I feel brand new / And if you don't like it, fuck you." The third track "Woohoo", featuring rapper Nicki Minaj, was detailed as an electro number, and speaks about oral sex, containing lyrics such as: "All the boys think it's cake when they taste my woohoo / You don't even need a plate, just your face." The following track "Elastic Love" features "808-esque backbeat" in its foundation. On the song, Aguilera uses office supplies such as rubber bands as a metaphor for her relationship. "Desnudate", which means "get naked" in Spanish, is a bilingual Spanish and English song in which Aguilera calls herself the "supplier of lust, love and fire." Musically, it achieves electro horns. "Love & Glamour (Intro)", which is a fashion-themed spoken interlude, follows, and is succeeded by "Glam", a "throbbing" dance-pop and electro song about high fashion and making up before going out, which was characterized as a hip hop-influenced throwback to Madonna's song "Vogue" (1990). "Prima Donna" is a retro styled combination of classic pop, dance-pop and electronic music. It talks about strong women, with background vocals from Lil Jon, who encourages them to "work yo' body" in the track.

The second half of Bionic explores a more balladic production. It begins with "Morning Dessert (Intro)", a soft soul interlude, which describes sex as a daily routine of Aguilera and her husband. On "Sex for Breakfast", which is an R&B ballad, Aguilera characterized her lover's penis as a "honey drip." The song is, according to musicOMH's Michael Cragg, similar to works by Janet Jackson. Aguilera explores her personal issues, such as motherhood and insecurities on ballads, which The Guardian's Alexis Petridis deemed "patented self-help ballads." The next four ballads "Lift Me Up", "All I Need", "I Am", and "You Lost Me" are piano-driven tracks that, in the words of Bent Koepp for Beats per Minute, "have Aguilera showcasing some of her best vocal performances to date." "All I Need" is dedicated to Aguilera's son, while "I Am" expresses Aguilera's self-consciousness, and "You Lost Me" is about an unfaithful man. "I Am" and "You Lost Me" also feature string instruments. Leah Greenblatt, writing for Entertainment Weekly, compared the ballads to Fiona Apple's songs. The standard edition of Bionic concludes with three uptempo tracks, the electropop song "I Hate Boys" which features Aguilera insulting men, the electro-disco song "My Girls" featuring Peaches, on which Aguilera sings about her company enjoying a party, including lyrics such as "My girls, we're stronger than one", and the disco song "Vanity", which was detailed as "an ode to the greatness of Aguilera cloaked in a paean to female empowerment" by Allison Stewart from The Washington Post, depicts Aguilera as a "harmless, mirror-kissing vamp." At the track's end, she questions: "Who owns the throne?", which her son as a toddler replies to: "You do, mommy".

The deluxe edition includes five bonus tracks – four new songs and an acoustic version of "I Am" entitled "I Am (Stripped)". "Monday Morning" is a new wave track, which is accompanied on a funk guitar and handclaps. "Bobblehead" is a hip hop-inspired song that features a "clattering, chanting" beat and Aguilera rapping. It berates women who, encouraged by a sexist culture, want to be valued more for their appearance than for their intellect. "Birds of Prey" is an synthpop-influenced electro song backed by "cool" synthesizers. "Stronger Than Ever" is a "mournful" ballad. The iTunes Store deluxe edition of Bionic also includes "Little Dreamer", a mid-tempo electropop ballad, characterized by "a skittering beat filled with beeps, glitches and trills," according to the Billboard magazine. Aguilera's vocals are a farewell to her titular dreamer.

== Title and artwork ==
The album was originally titled Light & Darkness; however, in February 2010, Aguilera announced that it would be titled Bionic. Bionic's cover artwork was designed by D*Face. The album's cover, which was unveiled on March 25, 2010, features half of Aguilera's face and half of a robot, with platinum curled hair locks, bright red lips, and long eyelashes. Ruth Doherty from InStyle called the cover "super-cool" and compared Aguilera's look to that of Arnold Schwarzenegger in the Terminator film series. MTV Newsroom's Kyle Anderson named it "delightfully strange" and opined that the cover artwork features references the cover artwork for Tokio Hotel's third studio album Humanoid (2009) and Madonna's music video for "Bedtime Story" (1994).

== Release and promotion ==
Originally entitled Light & Darkness, the album was set to be released in September 2009. In an interview for the February 2010 issue of Marie Claire, Aguilera announced that the project was entitled Bionic and would be made available in March 2010. However, on March 25 of that year, Aguilera re-confirmed that the album would be released on June 8. In May of that year, the fan edition of the project was made available for pre-order via Sony Music Entertainment. The release included exclusive features, including a 12-inch × 12-inch box, a triple vinyl set, a deluxe edition CD of Bionic, and two exclusive photographs of Aguilera. On June 4, 2010, Bionic was released for CD and digital download in Australia, Germany, the Netherlands and Spain. In the United States and Canada, the album was released on June 8.

Aguilera made various appearances on television shows in mid-2010 to promote Bionic. She appeared on The Oprah Winfrey Show on May 7 and performed the lead single "Not Myself Tonight". On May 26, Aguilera performed "You Lost Me" at the season finale of the ninth season of American Idol. The following month, Aguilera opened the 2010 MTV Movie Awards on June 6 with a medley of "Bionic", "Not Myself Tonight" and "Woohoo", and appeared on Today on June 8, where she performed "Bionic", "Not Myself Tonight", "You Lost Me", and two previous singles "Beautiful" and "Fighter". Later that month, she performed "You Lost Me" on the Late Show with David Letterman on June 9, and "Not Myself Tonight", "You Lost Me", "Fighter" and a medley of "Genie in a Bottle" and "What a Girl Wants" on The Early Show on June 11.

=== Cancelled concert tour ===
Aguilera initially planned to further promote the album by embarking on The Bionic Tour. It was announced in early May 2010 that twenty shows had been scheduled in North America, which would run from July 15, 2010, to August 19, 2010. British singer Leona Lewis was said to be a supporting act and the tour would be in conjunction with North American leg of Lewis's tour the Labyrinth (2010). Later that month, Aguilera announced that she would postpone the tour until 2011, however, that never happened. In a message from tour promoter Live Nation, Aguilera stated that due to the excessive promotion of the album and her then upcoming film debut in Burlesque, she felt it was necessary to take more time to rehearse the show and with less than a month between the album release and the tour, it was impossible to create a show as her fans' expectation.

=== Singles ===
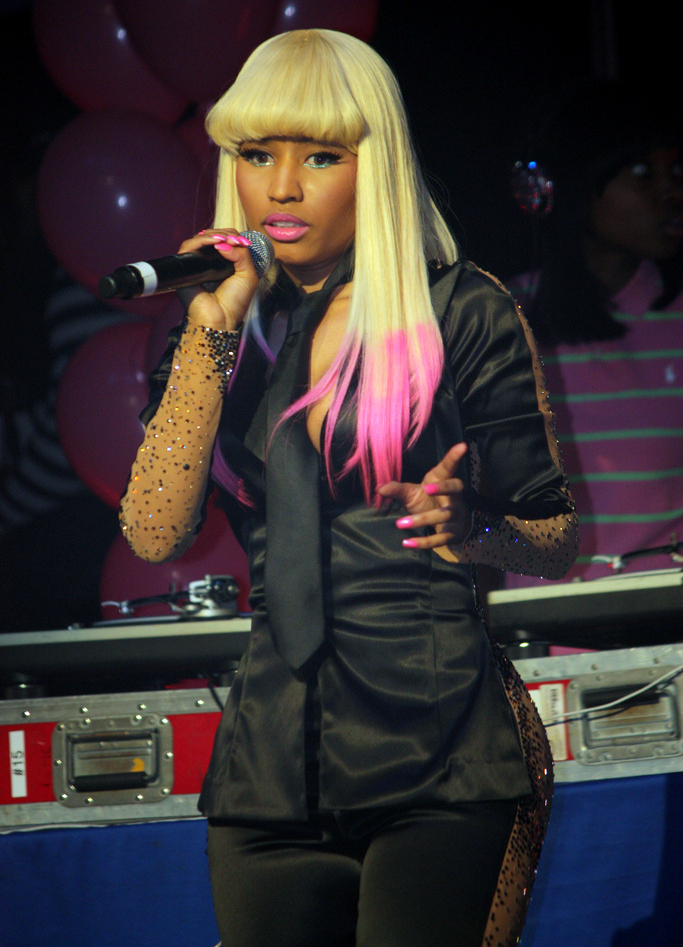
Nicki Minaj was featured on "Woohoo", which was released as the second single in the United States and some European countries

"Not Myself Tonight" was released as Bionic's lead single on April 2, 2010. It debuted and peaked at number twenty-three on the US Billboard Hot 100, becoming Aguilera's third highest solo debut on the chart after "Keeps Gettin' Better" (2008) and "Ain't No Other Man" (2006). Internationally, the song was a moderate commercial success, peaking at number twelve in the United Kingdom, and within the top forty in Australia, Austria, New Zealand and Sweden. The song received generally positive reviews from music critics, who complimented its club nature and Aguilera's vocals on the track; some reviewers also referred to it as her best uptempo recording since her single "Dirrty" (2002). The accompanying music video, directed by Hype Williams, featured a S&M theme with Aguilera sporting different bondage-inspired looks. Paying homage to Madonna's music videos for "Express Yourself" (1989) and "Human Nature" (1995), the video received mixed reviews from critics, who complimented its aesthetic but called it unoriginal.

"Woohoo", featuring rapper Nicki Minaj, was released as the second single from Bionic. It was made available exclusively to the iTunes Store on May 18, 2010 before being serviced to rhythmic contemporary radio on May 25, 2010. The song peaked at number one-hundred-and-forty-eight on the UK Singles Chart due to high digital sales. It received generally favorable reviews, with critics praising Minaj's appearance in the song and commending Aguilera's powerful vocals.

"You Lost Me" was released as the album's third single on June 27, 2010. The song was sent to contemporary hit radio on June 29, 2010, in the United States. Leah Greenblatt from Entertainment Weekly called "You Lost Me" a "lovely" ballad and Amber James said the song was a "somber track" that brings the "honesty and emotion that have made Aguilera one of the premier balladeers of our time." The music video premiered on Aguilera's official Vevo account on July 22. The music video's director Anthony Mandler also wrote the concept for the video, which features a series of connected vignettes. The song topped the US Dance Club Songs, making it the second single from Bionic to do so, after "Not Myself Tonight".

"I Hate Boys" was released as the fourth single digitally on September 3, 2010 in a two-track single format. It was the eighth most-added song to radio stations in Australia from the week ending July 23, 2010. It peaked at number twenty-eight on the Australian Airplay Chart. Additionally, in the United Kingdom "Lift Me Up" debuted at number 26 on the UK Independent Singles Chart.

== Critical reception ==
=== Initial reviews ===
Professional ratings
Aggregate scores
Source	Rating
Metacritic	56/100
Review scores
Source	Rating
AllMusic	3.5/5 stars
Billboard	4/5 stars
Entertainment Weekly	C
The Guardian	3/5 stars
The Independent	3/5 stars
NME	2.5/5 stars
Rolling Stone	2.5/5 stars
Slant Magazine	3/5 stars
Spin	6/10
The Times	4/5 stars

Bionic received generally mixed reviews from music critics at the time of its release. According to the review aggregator Metacritic, Bionic received "mixed or average reviews" based on a weighted average score of 56 out of 100 from 21 critic scores.

In a positive review, AllMusic editor Stephen Thomas Erlewine opined that the "robot-diva hybrids are often interesting even when they stumble". Margaret Wappler of the Los Angeles Times said that Aguilera's "hyper-sexed lover bot" persona is the album's "most successful vein". Pete Paphides of The Times found it sounding "older and more confident" than her previous work. Kitty Empire, writing in The Observer, found it to be "very strong, but only in parts", and said that its strength "lies in its core limb-shaking sass, even as it confuses girl-on-girl action with sisterhood." Drew Hinshaw of The Village Voice called it "precisely produced club-pop that moves bodies, if not spirits." Alexis Petridis, writing in The Guardian, commented that Bionic is an "occasionally brilliant and brave, occasionally teeth-gritting and stupid album."

It was criticized as an attempt to take advantage of electropop's popularity and imitate the sound and image of Lady Gaga. Slant Magazine's Eric Henderson said that it is as "efficient a pop entertainment" as was Britney Spears's album Circus, but felt that its attempt at hedonistic themes "feels synthetic and compulsory." Andy Gill of The Independent said that, apart from its basic R&B balladry, the album imitates Spears' and Janet Jackson's "electro-R&B schtick" to disguise Aguilera's "lack of any original approach." Jon Pareles, writing in The New York Times, remarked that its musical direction "makes her sound as peer-pressured as a pop singer can be." Omar Kholeif of PopMatters said that the album is not good because of "Aguilera's overzealous penchant for excess", while Entertainment Weekly's Leah Greenblatt blamed her "penchant for stock step-class beats and an aggressive, exhausting hypersexuality." The A.V. Club's Genevieve Koski wrote that the album sounds "muddled" because of its heavy reliance on a cadre of songwriters and producers. Dan Martin of NME said that the occasionally "daring" tracks are marred by ordinary house-licks that inhibit Aguilera's singing.

Billboard described Bionic as the "best mainstream pop album of the year thus far" upon its release. Conversely, Entertainment Weekly later named Bionic the fifth worst album of 2010 in a year-end list.

=== Retrospective commentary ===
In June 2012, Sam Lansky wrote for MTV News that the record "was, at times, precociously brilliant" and most of its songs were "thrilling", claiming that "the songs on the deluxe edition are forward-thinking and even timeless, galactic pop with subversive, ambient production." Lansky added that "two years after the fact, Bionic's moments of greatness remain about as good as it gets."

While reviewing Aguilera's eighth studio album, Liberation, in June 2018, Pitchfork writer Claire Lobenfield retrospectively hailed Bionic as a record with "cutting-edge singles" that was "perhaps too forward-thinking, a risk that could have reaped the rewards of poptimism if the album had only been released a few years later." The following October, Joey Guerra of Houston Chronicle echoed these statements regarding the progressive nature of the album, calling Bionic "a forward-thinking assertion of independence like Madonna's 'Erotica' and Janet Jackson's 'The Velvet Rope'." One of its tracks, "Birds of Prey", was ranked by Billboard at number 68 on a 2017 list of the hundred best deep cuts by 21st century pop stars, who wrote the song stood out as one of Aguilera's "most sonically beguiling compositions".

Ten years after Bionic's release, Glenn Rowley of Billboard wrote it had become "something of a cult favorite LP" over time and noted that there had been regular calls for "#JusticeForBionic" — the online campaign — on social media. Daniel Megarry of the Gay Times shared the same sentiment, calling it a "cult" record among the LGBTQ+ community, and believed it "will likely be re-discovered as a forgotten jewel by pop music fans for years to come". In 2024, Paper called the album "ever-controversial", also noting it "was misunderstood upon release but has become a cult favorite". LA Weekly opined that Bionic "has gained a cult following for its innovative electronic sound".

=== Accolades ===
List of accolades
Year	Nominated work	Category	Award/publication	Result	Ref.
2010	Bionic	Best Artistic Promotion	BT Digital Music Award	Nominated	
2011	"Not Myself Tonight"	Best Watched Video	MuchMusic Video Award	Nominated	
2011	Bionic	Best Album	The Flecking Award	Nominated	
2011	"Not Myself Tonight"	Best Pop Song	Spetteguless Award	Nominated	

== Commercial performance ==
Unlike Aguilera's previous studio albums, Bionic had trouble maintaining commercial success in the international markets. On the week ending June 26, 2010, the album debuted at number three on the US Billboard 200 with first-week sales of 110,000 copies. However, those first-week sales were comparatively less than those of Aguilera's previous studio album Back to Basics (2006), which peaked at number one with 346,000 copies sold. The following week the album fell to number nine with sales of 36,388 copies. In its third week, Bionic dropped to number twenty-two. Bionic has sold over 1.15 million tracks in the United States. As of August 2019, the album has sold 332,000 copies in the United States. As of June 2018, the album has moved 500,000 album-equivalent units in the United States, being certified by RIAA as Gold.

The album ranked as the year's seventy-sixth best-selling album in the United States. On the week ending June 26, 2010, Bionic debuted at its peak position, number three, on the Canadian Albums Chart. The following week, it charted at number nine. In the United Kingdom, Bionic debuted atop the UK Albums Chart, becoming Aguilera's second consecutive studio album to debut atop the chart with 24,000 copies sold. It became the lowest-selling UK Albums Chart number-one album in eight years but the record was later broken by Marina and the Diamonds and Newton Faulkner in 2012. However, in the album's second week on the chart, it made the UK Albums Chart history when, on June 20, it registered the largest drop in chart history for a number one album by falling twenty-eight places to number twenty-nine, selling 9,754 copies that week. This was beat by The Vamps in 2017, when their album Night & Day fell thirty-four places from number one to number thirty-five. Bionic has been certified silver by the British Phonographic Industry (BPI).

Bionic fared somewhat better in mainland Europe. It debuted atop the European Top 100 Albums, becoming Aguilera's second consecutive studio album to top the chart, staying atop the chart for one week. During the twenty-third week of 2010, the album debuted atop the Greek Top 50 Albums, replacing Soulfly's Omen, and receiving a gold certification from IFPI Greece. Another successful charting territory for Bionic was Switzerland, where the album peaked at number two, staying within the chart's top twenty-five for five consecutive weeks. The album also managed to peak within the top ten in Austria, Belgian region of Flanders, Czech Republic, Finland, Germany, Ireland, Italy, the Netherlands, Poland, Russia, Spain and Sweden. On the week ending June 12, Bionic debuted at number twenty-three on the French Albums Chart. As of December 2010, it has sold over 10,000 copies in the country.

The album peaked within the top ten in both Australia and New Zealand. On the week commencing June 14, the album debuted and peaked at number three on the Australian Albums Chart. It remained in the top five in its second week, and descended to number sixteen in its third week. Bionic was certified gold by the Australian Recording Industry Association (ARIA) for shipments exceeding 35,000 copies. In New Zealand, the album peaked at number six. The album also reached number one on the Taiwanese Albums Chart, as reported by Five Music on June 24, 2010.

== Track listing ==
Standard edition
No.	Title	Writer(s)	Producer(s)	Length
1.	"Bionic"	Christina Aguilera; John Hill; Dave Taylor; Kalenna Harper	Hill; Switch	3:21
2.	"Not Myself Tonight"	Jamal Jones; Ester Dean; Jason Perry; Greg Curtis	Polow da Don	3:05
3.	"Woohoo" (featuring Nicki Minaj)	Aguilera; Jones; Dean; Claude Kelly; Onika Maraj	Polow da Don; Kelly^{[a]}	5:28
4.	"Elastic Love"	Aguilera; Mathangi Arulpragasam; Hill; Taylor	Hill; Switch	3:34
5.	"Desnudate"	Aguilera; Christopher "Tricky" Stewart; Kelly	Stewart; Kelly^{[a]}	4:25
6.	"Love & Glamour" (Intro)			0:11
7.	"Glam"	Aguilera; Stewart; Kelly	Stewart; Kelly^{[a]}	3:40
8.	"Prima Donna"	Aguilera; Stewart; Kelly	Stewart; Kelly^{[a]}	3:26
9.	"Morning Dessert" (Intro)	Bernard Edwards Jr.	Focus...	1:33
10.	"Sex for Breakfast"	Aguilera; Detail; Edwards Jr.	Focus...; Detail^{[a]}	4:49
11.	"Lift Me Up"	Linda Perry	Perry	4:07
12.	"My Heart" (Intro)			0:19
13.	"All I Need"	Aguilera; Sia Furler; Samuel Dixon	Dixon; Furler^{[a]}	3:33
14.	"I Am"	Aguilera; Furler; Dixon	Dixon; Furler^{[a]}	3:52
15.	"You Lost Me"	Aguilera; Furler; Dixon	Dixon; Furler^{[a]}	4:17
16.	"I Hate Boys"	Aguilera; Jones; Dean; William Tyler; Bill Wellings; J.J. Hunter	Polow da Don; Kelly^{[a]}	2:24
17.	"My Girls" (featuring Peaches)	Aguilera; Kathleen Hanna; Johanna Fateman; J.D. Samson; Merrill Nisker	Le Tigre	3:08
18.	"Vanity"	Aguilera; Dean; Kelly	Dean; Kelly^{[a]}	4:22
Total length:				59:27

Deluxe edition
No.	Title	Writer(s)	Producer(s)	Length
19.	"Monday Morning"	Aguilera; Santi White; Hill; Taylor; Sam Endicott	Hill; Switch	3:54
20.	"Bobblehead"	Aguilera; White; Hill; Taylor	Hill; Switch	3:02
21.	"Birds of Prey"	Aguilera; Cathy Dennis; Helen Marnie; Daniel Hunt; Mira Aroyo; Reuben Wu	Ladytron	4:19
22.	"Stronger Than Ever"	Aguilera; Furler; Dixon	Dixon; Furler^{[a]}	4:16
23.	"I Am" (Stripped)	Aguilera; Furler; Dixon	Dixon; Furler^{[a]}	3:55
Total length:				79:05

iTunes Store and 2020 deluxe edition
No.	Title	Writer(s)	Producer(s)	Length
24.	"Little Dreamer"	Aguilera; Dennis; Hunt; Wu	Ladytron	4:11
Total length:				83:05

=== Notes ===
- ^{^[a]} signifies a vocal producer.
- In China, Bionic excludes the tracks "Woohoo", "Morning Dessert (Intro)", and "Sex for Breakfast".

=== Sampling credits ===
- "Woohoo" contains a sample from "Add Már, Uram Az Esőt!" performed by Kati Kovács.
- "I Hate Boys" contains a sample from "Jungle Juice", written by Bill Wellings, J.J. Hunter, and performed by Elektrik Cokernut.

== Personnel ==
Credits were adapted from the liner notes.

- Christina Aguilera – vocals
- John Salvatore Scaglione – electric guitar
- Leo Abrahams – acoustic guitar, electric guitar
- Brett Banducci – viola
- Felix Bloxsom – percussion, drums
- Denise Briese – contrabass
- Alejandro Carballo – trombone
- Daphne Chen – violin, concert mistress
- Matt Cooker – cello
- Pablo Correa – percussion
- Ester Dean – background vocals
- Samuel Dixon – acoustic guitar, bass, piano, celeste
- Richard Dodd – cello
- Stefanie Fife – cello
- Sam Fischer – violin
- Jimmy Hogarth – acoustic guitar, electric guitar
- Chauncey "Hit-Boy" Hollis – keyboards
- Paul Ill – bass
- Claude Kelly – background vocals
- James King – flute, alto sax, baritone sax, tenor sax, snake
- Anna Kostyuchek – violin
- Oliver Kraus – strings, string arrangements, string engineering
- John Krovoza – cello
- Marisa Kuney – violin
- Victoria Lanier – violin
- Juan Manuel-Leguizamón – percussion
- Ami Levy – violin
- Abe Liebhaber – cello
- Nicki Minaj – vocals (track 3)
- Diego Miralles – cello
- Julio Miranda – guitar
- Karolina Naziemiec – viola
- Neli Nikolaeva – violin
- Cameron Patrick – violin
- Peaches – rap
- Linda Perry – bass, guitar, percussion, piano, keyboards
- Radu Pieptea – violin
- Melissa Reiner – violin
- David Sage – viola
- Kellii Scott – drums
- Arturo Solar – trumpet
- Audrey Solomon – violin
- Jenny Takamatsu – violin
- Tom Tally – viola
- Jason Torreano – contrabass
- Jessica van Velzen – viola
- Amy Wickman – violin
- Rodney Wirtz – viola
- Richard Worn – contrabass
- Alwyn Wright – violin
- Deantoni Parks – drums ("Monday Morning")
- Thomas Aiezza – assistant engineer
- Brian "Fluff" Allison – assistant engineer
- Christopher Anderson-Bazzoli – conductor
- Matt Benefield – assistant engineer, assistant
- Richard Brown – assistant engineer
- Dan Carey – mixing
- Andrew Chavez – Pro-Tools
- Cameron Craig – engineering
- Ester Dean – production
- Detail – vocal production
- Samuel Dixon – programming, production, engineering
- D Face – artwork
- Sia Furler – vocal production
- Brian Gardner – mastering
- Terry Glenny – violin
- Larry Goldings – piano
- Eric Gorfain – string arrangements
- Josh Gudwin – engineering
- Kuk Harrell – engineering
- John Hill – production, engineering, instrumentation
- Jimmy Hogarth – engineering
- Jaycen Joshua – mixing
- Josh Mosser – engineering
- Claude Kelly – vocal production
- Alex Leader – engineering, assistant engineer
- Giancarlo Lino – assistant
- Erik Madrid – assistant
- Alix Malka – photography
- Manny Marroquin – engineering, mixing
- Kyle Moorman – Pro-Tools
- Bryan Morton – engineering
- Luis Navarro – assistant
- Linda Perry – programming, production, engineering
- Christian Plata – assistant
- Polow da Don – production
- Oscar Ramirez – engineering, vocal engineering
- TheRealFocus... – production, instrumentation
- Andros Rodriguez – engineer
- Alexis Smith – assistant engineer
- Eric Spring – engineering
- Jay Stevenson – assistant engineer
- Jeremy Stevenson – engineering
- Christopher Stewart – production
- Subskrpt – engineering, assistant engineer
- Switch – production, engineering, mixing, instrumentation
- Brian "B-Luv" Thomas – engineering
- Pat Thrall – engineering
- Le Tigre – production
- Randy Urbanski – assistant
- Eli Walker – engineering
- Cory Williams – engineering
- Andrew Wuepper – engineering
- Reuben Wu – production

== Charts ==
=== Weekly charts ===
Chart (2010)	Peak position
Australian Albums (ARIA)	3
Australian Digital Albums (ARIA)	3
Austrian Albums (Ö3 Austria)	3
Belgian Albums (Ultratop Flanders)	4
Belgian Albums (Ultratop Wallonia)	23
Canadian Albums (Billboard)	3
Croatian International Albums (HDU)	6
Czech Albums (ČNS IFPI)	4
Danish Albums (Hitlisten)	12
Dutch Albums (MegaCharts)	6
European Top 100 Albums (Billboard)	1
Finnish Albums (Suomen virallinen lista)	10
French Albums (SNEP)	23
German Albums (Offizielle Top 100)	6
Greek Albums (IFPI)	1
Hungarian Albums (MAHASZ)	12
Irish Albums (IRMA)	4
Italian Albums (FIMI)	8
Japanese Albums (Oricon)	6
Mexican Albums (Top 100 Mexico)	8
New Zealand Albums (RMNZ)	6
Norwegian Albums (VG-lista)	20
Polish Albums (ZPAV)	7
Russian Albums (2M)	5
Scottish Albums (OC)	2
South Korean Albums (Gaon)	6
South Korean International Albums (Gaon)	1
Spanish Albums (PROMUSICAE)	4
Swedish Albums (Sverigetopplistan)	9
Swiss Albums (Schweizer Hitparade)	2
Taiwanese Albums (Five Music)	1
UK Albums (OC)	1
US Billboard 200	3

=== Year-end charts ===
Chart (2010)	Position
Russian Albums (2M)	89
US Billboard 200	139

== Certifications and sales ==
Region	Certification	Certified units/sales
Australia (ARIA)	Gold	35,000^{^}
Austria (IFPI Austria)	Gold	10,000^{*}
Brazil (Pro-Música Brasil)	Gold	20,000^{‡}
Greece (IFPI Greece)	Gold	3,000^{^}
United Kingdom (BPI)	Silver	60,000^{^}
United States (RIAA)	Gold	500,000^{‡}
^{*} Sales figures based on certification alone.^{^} Shipments figures based on certification alone.^{‡} Sales+streaming figures based on certification alone.

== Release history ==
List of release dates and formats
Region	Date	Edition(s)	Format(s)	Label(s)	Ref.
Australia	June 4, 2010	Standard; deluxe	CD; digital download	Sony Music	
Germany	June 4, 2010	Standard; deluxe	CD; digital download	Sony Music	
Netherlands	June 4, 2010	Standard; deluxe	CD; digital download	Sony Music	
Spain	June 4, 2010	Standard; deluxe	CD; digital download	Sony Music	
France	June 7, 2010	Standard; deluxe	CD; digital download	Sony Music	
Malaysia	June 7, 2010	Deluxe	CD; digital download	Sony Music	
Poland	June 7, 2010	Eco; standard; deluxe	CD; digital download	Sony Music	
Turkey	June 7, 2010	Standard; deluxe	CD; digital download	Sony Music	
United Kingdom	June 7, 2010	Standard; deluxe; fan	CD; digital download; LP	RCA	
Argentina	June 8, 2010	Standard	CD; digital download	Sony Music	
Philippines	June 8, 2010	Standard	CD; digital download	Sony Music	
United States	June 8, 2010	Standard; deluxe; fan	CD; digital download; LP	RCA	
Japan	June 8, 2010	June 9, 2010	Deluxe	CD; digital download	Sony Music
Taiwan	June 11, 2010		Deluxe	CD; digital download	Sony Music
China	August 20, 2010	Standard		CD; digital download	Sony Music
Worldwide	June 8, 2020	Deluxe reissue	Digital download, streaming	RCA	
United States	April 2, 2021	Deluxe reissue	LP	RCA	(Note: Urban Outfitters exclusive black and grey splattered clear vinyl.)
