= Kati Kovács =

Hungarian singer (born 1944)

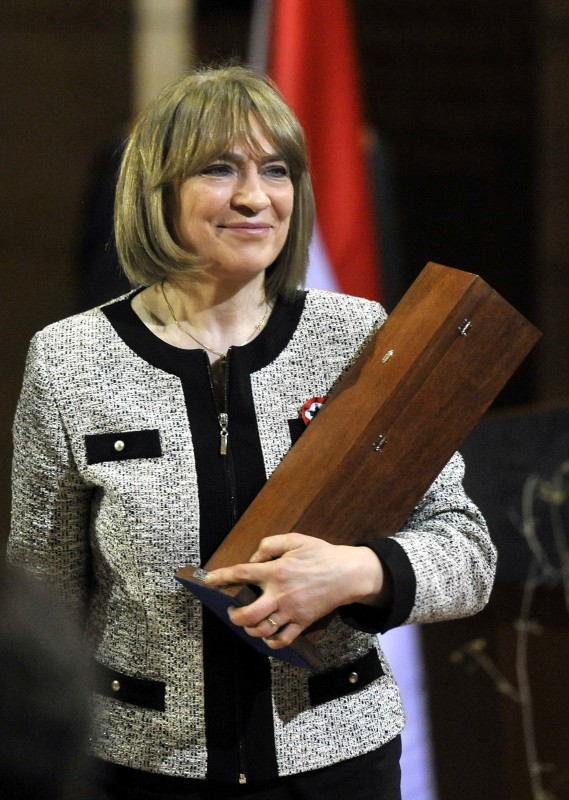
- Kovács receiving the Kossuth Prize in 2014

Background information
- Born: Katalin Anna Sarolta Kovács; 25 October 1944 (age 81); Verpelét, Hungary
- Genres: Jazz; rock; pop
- Occupation: Singer
- Years active: 1962–present
- Labels: Hungaroton; Amiga; Eurovoice
- Website: kovacskati.hu

Kati Kovács (born Katalin Anna Sarolta Kovács 25 October 1944) is a Ferenc Liszt and Kossuth Award-winning Hungarian pop and rock singer, performer, lyricist and actress.

Kovacs is known for her raspy and very strong mezzo-soprano singing voice which received wide praise from Hungarian music critics who have called her: "The Best Female Voice of Hungary". She has sung opera, rock, jazz, pop, dance, blues and rock and roll.

== Career ==
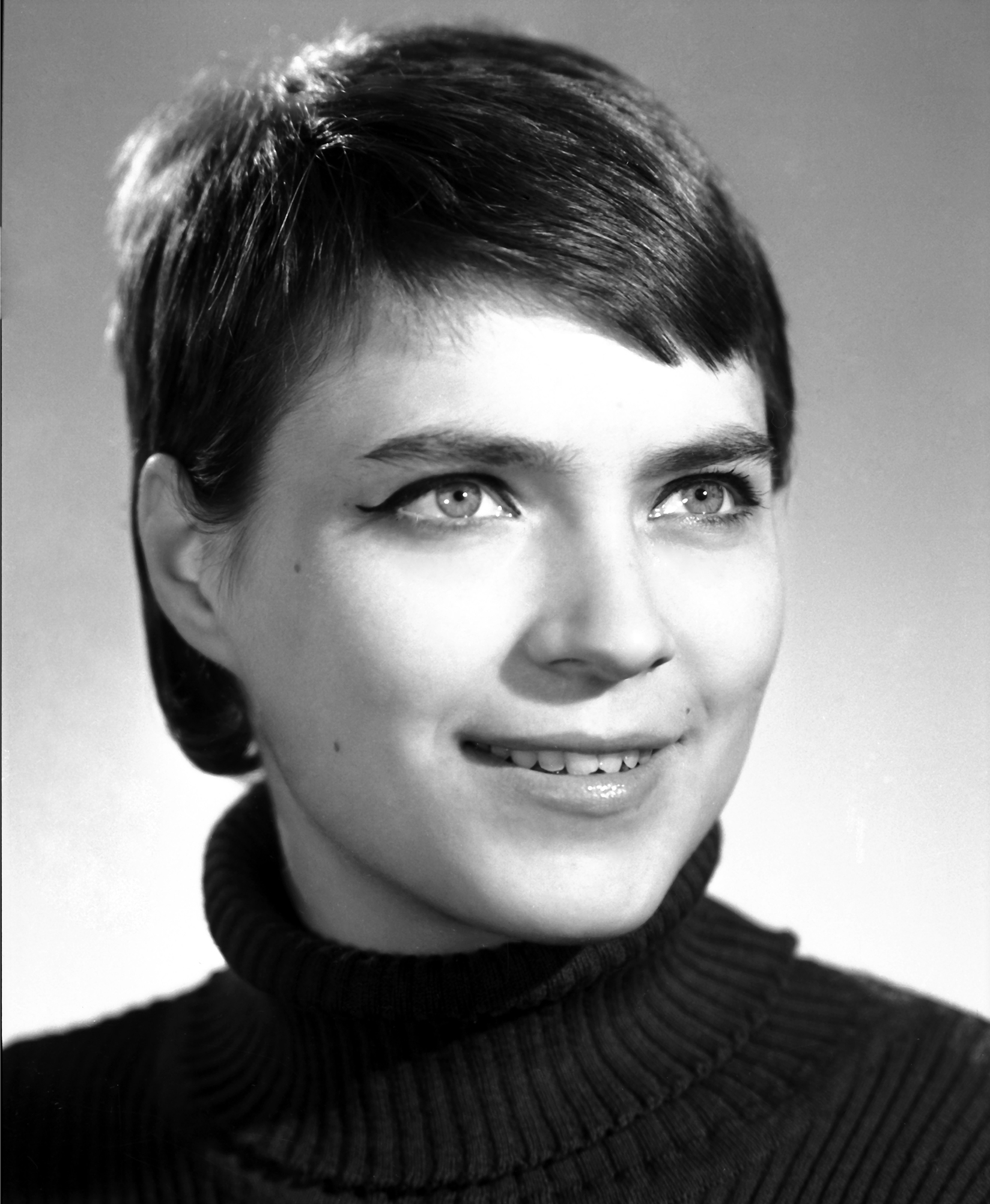
Kovács, 1960s

She appeared first time on stage in 1962. She became the first famous nationally in 1965 when she won the seminal TV talent show in Hungary Ki mit tud?. A year later, she achieved some even greater successes with her performance of the song "I Won't Be Your Plaything" ("Nem leszek a játékszered") which won the TV Dance Song Festivals in Hungary in 1966.

In 1968 she played the leading roles in some films, for example The Girl.

The psychedelic and spiritual song "Lord Send Us Rain!" ("Add már, uram, az esőt!") won the Hungarian Dance Song Festival and the German Song Contest in 1972.

She worked with the Hungarian rock band Locomotiv GT on three studio albums (Kovács Kati & Locomotiv GT, Közel a naphoz and Kati) and a compilation album (Rock and roller).

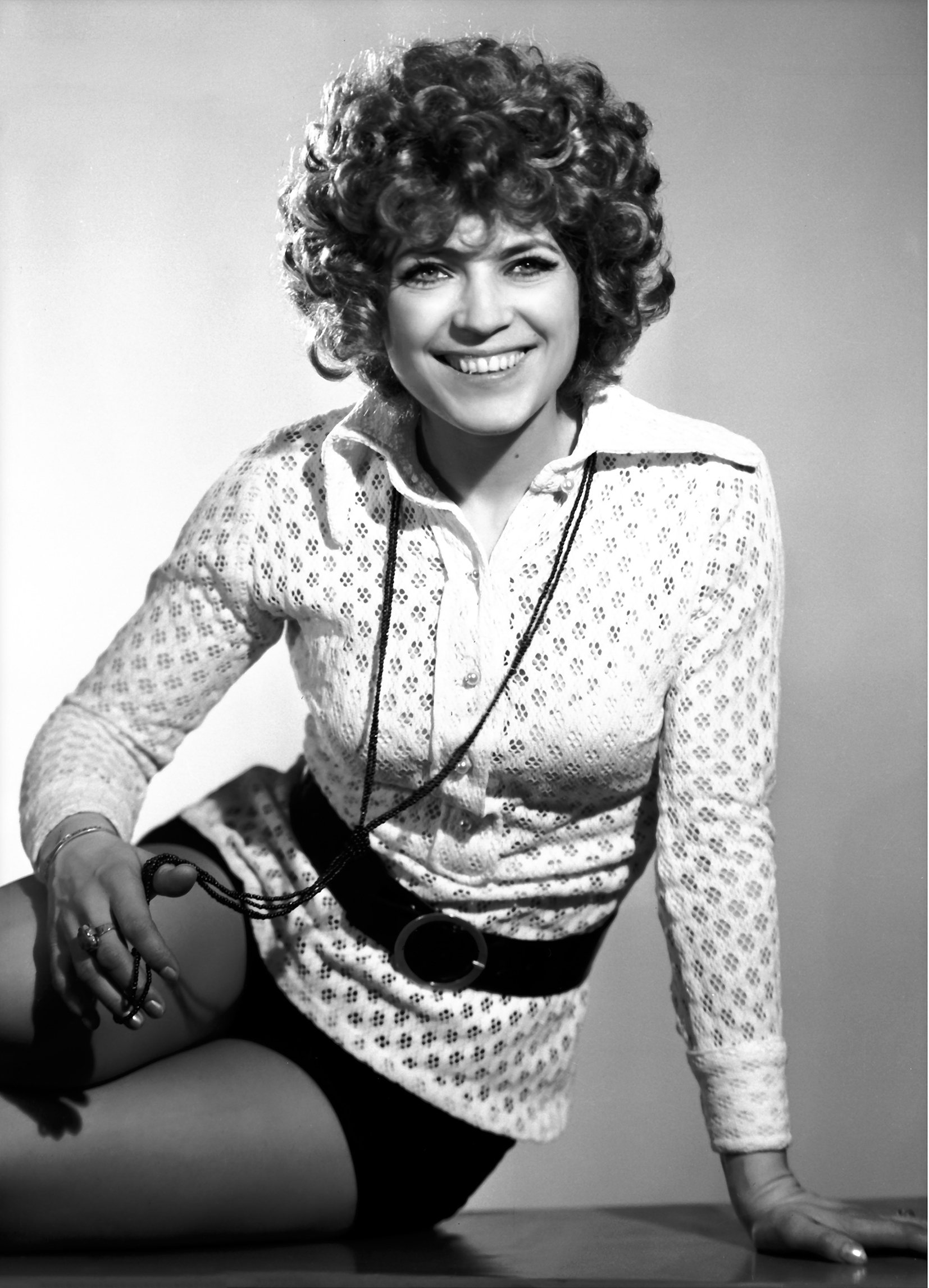
Kovács, 1970s

In 1974 she won the Castlebar Song Contest in Ireland with the song "Roses Are Red, Violets Are Blue" ("Nálad lenni újra jó lenne").

She appeared as a singer in the 1977 Hungarian film The Two of Them (Ők ketten), which was directed by Márta Mészáros.

Since 1979 she sang cover versions of several disco and hit songs in Hungary originally performed by Donna Summer, Barbra Streisand, Laura Branigan, Madonna, Tanita Tikaram, Sam Brown, Anastacia etc.

Besides singing, Kovács also writes lyrics. One of her best known works which she also performed is the lyrics to Vangelis' composition "1492: Conquest of Paradise".

Since 23 October 2009 she works with the psychedelic soul-beat band the Qualitons. They had a very successful concert in Budapest with the singer's rare beat and funk songs. It is said to be Kovács's big comeback. In 2010 they are on tour around the country. They were planning a new album together but they broke up.

American singer-songwriter Christina Aguilera's 2010 single "Woohoo" contains a sample from the song "Add már, uram, az esőt!".

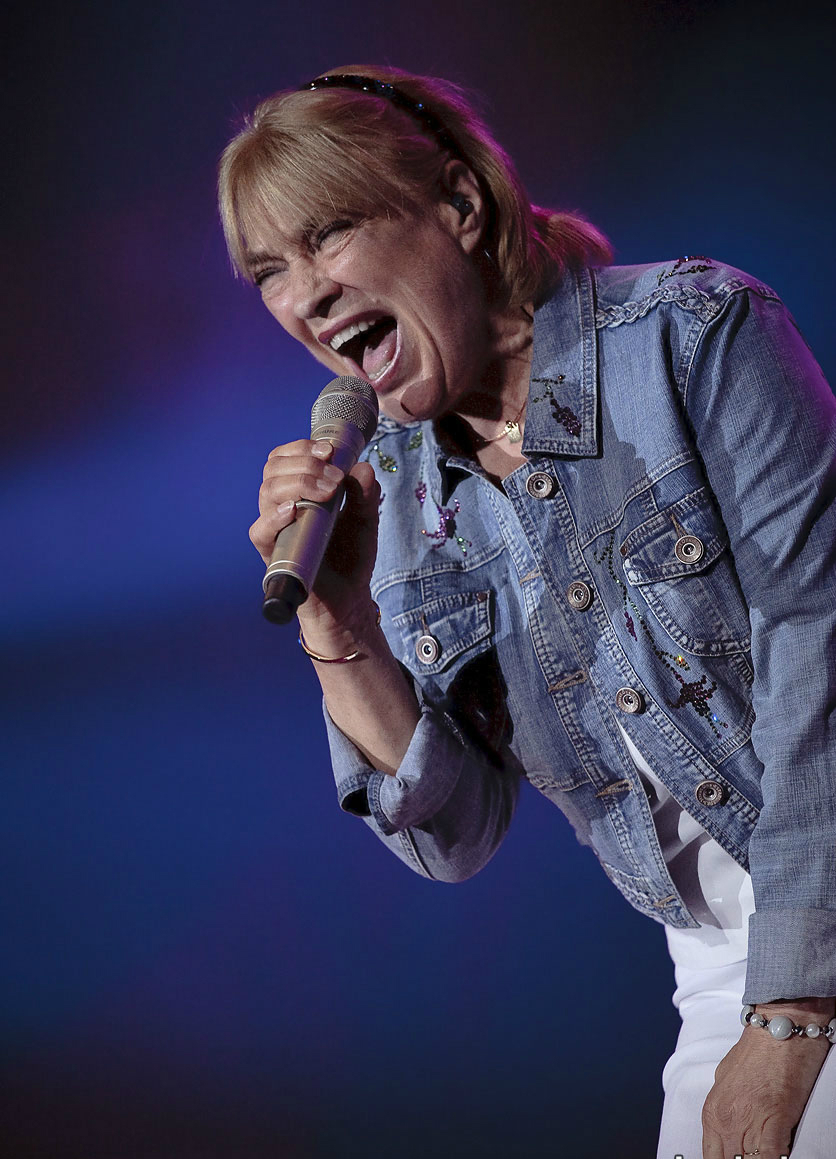
Kovács performing at Sziget Festival in Budapest, 2012

== Awards ==
- Music Week Star of the Year Award (England) in 1974
- Liszt Prize in 1986
- Order of Merit of the Republic of Hungary – Knight's Cross in 1994
- Order of Merit of the Republic of Hungary – Officer's Cross in 2011
- Honorary Citizen of Budapest in 2011
- Kossuth Prize in 2014

== Albums ==
Year	Title	Title	Label	Catalogue	Format	Type	Country	Reissue
1970	Suttogva és kiabálva	Whispering and Shouting	Qualiton	SLPX 17411	LP	Studio	Hungary	2018 CD
1972	Autogram helyett	Instead of Autograph	Pepita	SLPX 17445	LP	Studio	Hungary	2018 CD
1974	Kovács Kati & Locomotiv GT	Kovács Kati & Locomotiv GT	Pepita	SLPX 17472	LP	Studio	Hungary	1983 Krém LP, MC; 1994 Hungaroton CD, MC
1974	Kati Kovács	Kati Kovács	Amiga	8 55 359	LP	Studio	GDR	
1975	Intarzia	Inlay	Pepita	SLPX 17495	LP	Studio	Hungary	
1976	Közel a naphoz	Close to the Sun	Pepita	SLPX 17496	LP	Studio	Hungary	1995 Hungaroton CD, MC
1976	Kati	Kati	Amiga	8 55 452	LP	Studio	GDR	
1976	Rock and Roller	Rock and Roller	Pepita	MK 7008	MC	Compilation	Hungary	
1977	Csendszóró	Silentophone	Pepita	SLPX 17526	LP, MC	Studio	Hungary	
1978	Kovács Kati / Szörényi Levente / Adamis Anna: Életem lemeze	The Record of My Life	Pepita	SLPX 17553	LP, MC	Studio	Hungary	1994 Hungaroton CD, MC
1979	Szívemben zengő dal	A Song Resounding in My Heart	Pepita	SLPX 17581	LP, MC	Studio	Hungary	
1980	Kovács Kati Tíz	Kati Kovács Ten	Pepita	SLPX 17630	LP, MC	Studio	Hungary	
1983	Érj utol	Catch Me	Favorite	SLPM 17824	LP, MC	Studio	Hungary	
1985	Szerelmes levél indigóval	Love Letter written by Indigo	Favorite	SLPM 17893	LP, MC	Studio	Hungary	
1985	Álmodik az állatkert	Dreaming of the zoo	Hungaroton	SLPM 14033	LP	Studio	Hungary	
1986	Kívánságműsor	Request Programme	Favorite	SLPM 37030	LP, MC	Compilation	Hungary	
1989	Kell néha egy kis csavargás	Must sometimes a little truancy	Hungaroton	SLPM 17715	LP, MC	Studio	Hungary	
1990	Szólj rám, ha hangosan énekelek	Tell Me if I am Singing Too Loud	Profil	HCD 37348	CD	Compilation	Hungary	1999 CD, MC
1992	A Kovács Kati	The Kati Kovács	Hungaroton	SLPM 37578	LP, CD, MC	Compilation	Hungary	
1992	Forgószél	Whirlwind	Craft Records	CR 003	CD, MC	Studio	Hungary	
1992	Megtalálsz engem	Find me	Hangszó Records	MK 002	MC	Compilation	Hungary	
1996	Love Game / Vangelis 1492	Love Game / Vangelis 1492	Ka-Ti Bt.	KKCD 001	CD, MC	Studio	Hungary	
1997	Különös utakon	Particularly Roads	Eurovoice	KKCD 002	CD	Studio	Hungary	
1999	A magyar tánczene csillagai 2.	The Stars of the Hungarian Dance Music	Reader's Digest	RM-CD9905-02	CD, MC	Compilation	Hungary	
1999	Édesanyámnak szeretettel	To My Mother with Love	Eurovoice	KKCD 003	CD, MC	Studio	Hungary	
2000	Kincses sziget	Treasure Island	Eurovoice	KKCD 004	CD, MC	Studio	Hungary	
2002	Gyere, szeress!	Come and Love Me	Eurovoice	KKCD 005	CD, MC	Studio	Hungary	
2007	Die großen Erfolge	Greatest Hits	Sony BMG / Amiga	88697073362	CD, MC	Compilation	Germany	
2011	Találkozás egy régi szerelemmel	Greatest Hits 1965–1991	Reader's Digest	20229111	4 CD	Compilation	Hungary	
2014	Nem leszek a játékszered	Greatest Hits	Hungaroton	HCD71291	CD	Compilation	Hungary	
2015	Napfényes álom	Greatest Hits	Reader's Digest	GB-CD150119-1-3	3CD	Compilation	Hungary	

== See also ==
- Hungarian pop
