= Woohoo (Christina Aguilera song) =

Single by Christina Aguilera featuring Nicki Minaj

from the album Bionic
- Released: May 18, 2010
- Studio: No Excuses (Los Angeles), The Red Lips Room (Beverly Hills)
- Genre: Dancehall; electro-R&B
- Length: 5:29
- Label: RCA
- Songwriters: Christina Aguilera; Jamal Jones; Ester Dean; Claude Kelly; Onika Maraj
- Producers: Polow da Don; Claude Kelly

Christina Aguilera singles chronology
"Not Myself Tonight" (2010)	"Woohoo" (2010)	"You Lost Me" (2010)

Nicki Minaj singles chronology
"Massive Attack" (2010)	"Woohoo" (2010)	"Your Love" (2010)

Audio video
- "Woohoo" on YouTube

"Woohoo" is a song by American singer Christina Aguilera featuring rapper Nicki Minaj. The song was written by Aguilera, Onika Maraj, Claude Kelly, Ester Dean and Jamal "Polow da Don" Jones, and produced by Polow da Don, for Aguilera's sixth studio album, Bionic (2010). "Woohoo" was released digitally in the United States on May 18, 2010, and serviced to rhythmic contemporary crossover airplay on May 25, 2010. The song, which samples the 1972 song "Add már uram az esőt" by Hungarian singer Kati Kovács, is about oral sex.

"Woohoo" has been described as an electro-R&B and dancehall track. The song received mixed to positive reviews from critics, some of whom praised Minaj's appearance and Aguilera's vocals. However, others expressed distaste for the song's sexual nature. "Woohoo" debuted and peaked at 46 and 79 in Canada and the United States, respectively. Aguilera performed the song in a medley with "Bionic" and "Not Myself Tonight" at the 2010 MTV Movie Awards. The song was later included in the setlist for Aguilera's Vegas residency Christina Aguilera: The Xperience and her 2018 stage comeback — The Liberation Tour.

== Composition ==
"Woohoo" (2010)
A 30-second sample of "Woohoo".

"Woohoo" was written by Aguilera, Maraj, Claude Kelly, Ester Dean and Polow da Don. The song is an electro, R&B and dancehall track. Aguilera's vocals are distorted in parts. "Woohoo" contains a sample from the Hungarian song "Add már uram az esőt", originally sung by the Hungarian singer Kati Kovács in 1972. The song's chorus has been described as "shouty" and "sing-song". Rob Harvilla of The Village Voice noted that the song sounded like a mix of "Milkshake" and "Lip Gloss" with "electro synths". The song is about oral sex, and has been called a "humorous ode to cunnilingus" by music critic Alim Kheraj.

== Critical reception ==
"Woohoo" received mixed to positive reviews from critics; most of them commended Aguilera's vocals and Minaj's appearance. However, others were not impressed with the song's sexual nature. Sara D. Anderson of AOL Music said the "provocative, dancehall track nicely fuses Aguilera's powerful voice with Minaj's MC tactics". Benjamin Boles of Now Magazine called the track the top track on Bionic, commenting that Minaj's cameo "rescues" the song. Alexis Petridis of The Guardian said, "If you're going to do a five-minute song about cunnilingus, it's a good idea to enlist foul-mouthed rapper Nicki Minaj, whose bug-eyed contribution lends the proceedings an air of gripping abandon." Chris Ryan of MTV Buzzworthy called the song "sexually explicit, funky club pop", saying "In Nicki Minaj, Aguilera has found the perfect partner for her erotic-pop adventures". He also called the song a "dirtier cousin of Rihanna's 'Rude Boy' or 'Hollaback Girl'", and commended Minaj's verse.

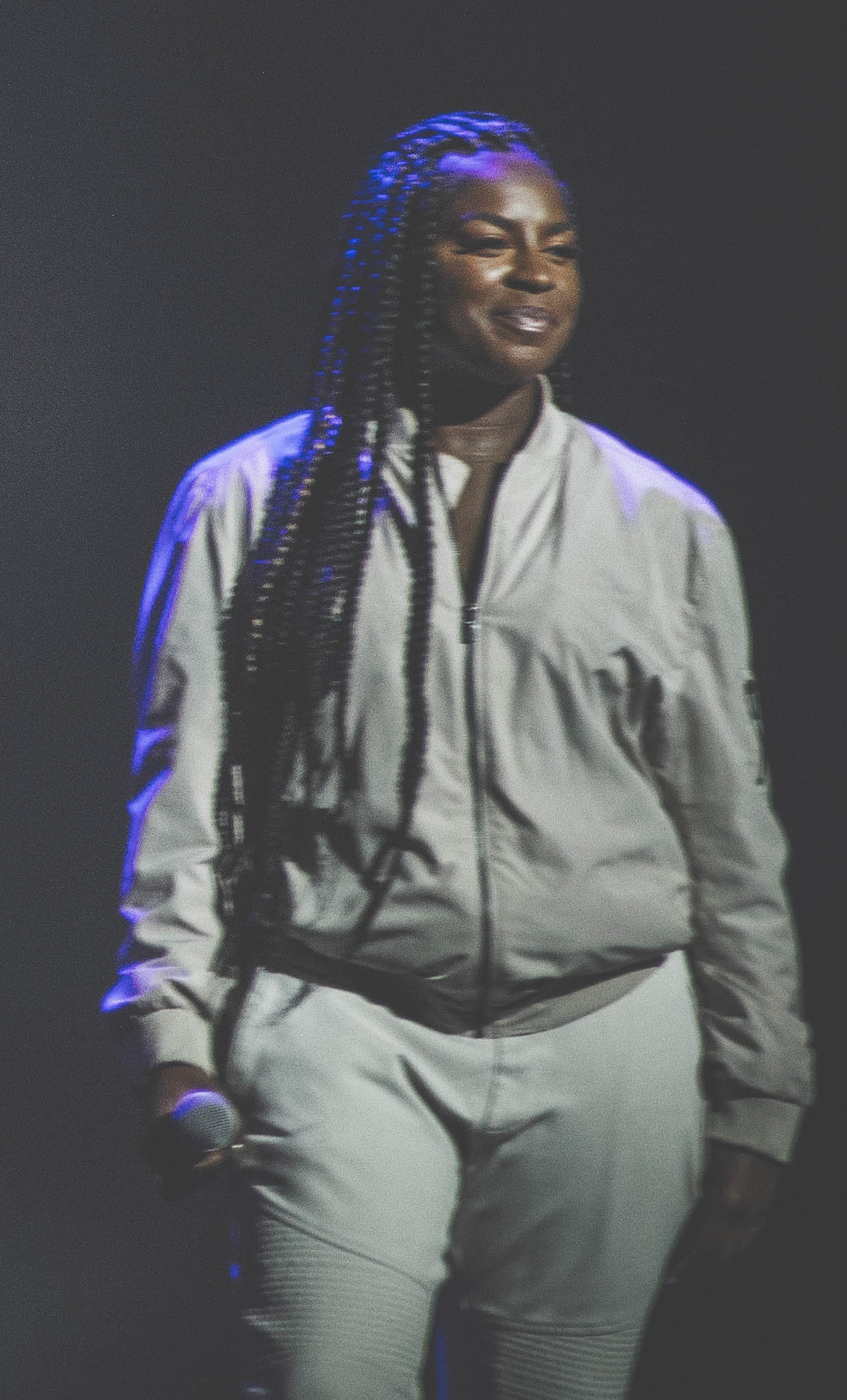
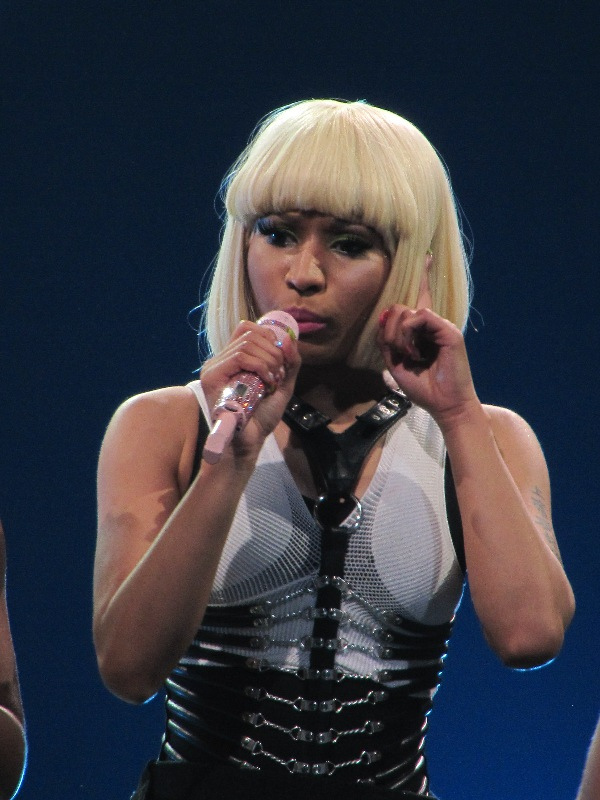
Ester Dean (left) and Nicki Minaj (right) co-wrote the song. Minaj featured on the song; her verse was critically acclaimed.

Stephen Thomas Erlewine of AllMusic said the track had an "incessant title loop piercing like a dental drill" and said it "doesn't work as temptation". He also commented "her crassness is no longer alienating as it was on Stripped". Michael Cragg of musicOMH also compared the song to dental work, commenting that the song, "which is about oral sex but is about as sexy as going to the dentist." Genevieve Koski of The A.V. Club called the song "already-passé electro trash." Billboard's Glenn Rowley called "Woohoo" a "raunchy banger". According to the Gay Times writer Daniel Megarry, Nicki Minaj's verse in the song "happens to be" one of the very best efforts of her career.

=== Retrospective commentary ===
Attitude opined that the song is "not subtle, but it is fun". Entertainment-related website Tan's Topic called "Woohoo" a "classic sexual Christina track with a 'Dirrty' dancehall vibe and plenty of naughty lyrics", as well as the "'Candyman' of the 21st century". The Tab's Harrison Brocklehurst ranked "Woohoo" among Aguilera's greatest singles and labelled it as "bratty pop perfection". He further noted that the song is "a weird, hand-clappy masterpiece that’s aged marvellously".

== Chart performance ==
In its first week of release, "Woohoo" debuted at 46 on the Canadian Hot 100, and 79 on the Billboard Hot 100. The song became Aguilera's 15th straight single to hit both charts, keeping her streak of having all of her singles chart on the Billboard Hot 100. The song fell off both charts the following week. However, due to increased digital sales after her performance at the 2010 MTV Movie Awards and the release of Bionic, the song re-entered the Billboard Hot 100 at number 99. The song also charted at number 148 on the UK Singles Chart after the release of Bionic. In June 2010, "Woohoo" entered the Gaon Digital Chart in South Korea at number twenty-seven.

== Promotion and live performances ==
Originally, "Woohoo" was meant to be released as the second single from Bionic in the United Kingdom, but — as Official Charts Company reported — these plans were ultimately cancelled. There were plans to shoot a music video for the song but those were scrapped. Stevie Boi was set to direct the video before it was cancelled. Aguilera sang a portion of the song, alongside "Bionic" and "Not Myself Tonight", at the 2010 MTV Movie Awards. During "Woohoo", the last of the set, Aguilera and her backup dancers removed their leather capes and revealing painted red hearts on their groins, ending with Aguilera's LED heart glowing. James Montgomery of MTV News referred to the song as a "seriously sexy dance number." Montgomery described the performance's ending, stating, "Not to be outdone, Aguilera ended things by standing tall at center stage, the camera zooming in on her midsection, which now bore a beating heart of its own."

Most critics were not impressed with the medley, comparing it to Aguilera's identity during the Bionic era. Tamar Anitai, also of MTV Buzzworthy summarized the performance saying it "was all about her "I-I'm-still-a-diva" vocals, frenzied stage show, and adult-only innuendo...And then this happened." She went on to comment also sarcastically, "This is so just Christina Aguilera's way of saying she loves you! And that the diminutive diva still has a sense of humor....It's like a little knowing wink that assures you that when she's not changing diapers and doing mommy stuff, Mamaguilera's hanging out at dance party sex dungeons and wailing from the bottom of her light-up hoo-ha. She is definitely not the same girl who once bopped around on the Disney Channel in a Scrunchie."

The song was later included in the setlist for Aguilera's Vegas residency Christina Aguilera: The Xperience and her 2018 Liberation Tour. In September 2021, the singer performed "Woohoo" during the LadyLand Festival in New York.

== Credits and personnel ==
- Songwriting – Christina Aguilera, Onika Maraj, Claude Kelly, Ester Dean, Polow da Don
- Production – Polow da Don
- Vocal production — additional by Claude Kelly
- Mixing – Jaycen Joshua, assisted by Giancarlo Lino
- Engineering – assistant, Matt Benefield
- Recording — Josh Mosser and Jeremy Stevenson
- Vocal recording — Oscar Ramirez

== Charts ==
=== Weekly charts ===
Chart (2010)	Peak position
Canada Hot 100 (Billboard)	46
Canadian Digital Song Sales (Billboard)	28
Germany (Deutsche Black Charts)	10
New Zealand Urban Airplay (Recorded Music NZ)	94
South Korea International (Gaon)	27
UK Singles (Official Charts)	148
US Billboard Hot 100	79
US Dance/Electronic Digital Song Sales (Billboard)	11

=== Year-end charts ===
Chart (2010)	Position
Germany (Deutsche Black Charts)	104

== Release history ==
Region	Date	Format(s)	Label(s)	Ref.
United States	May 18, 2010	Digital download	RCA	
United States	May 25, 2010	Rhythmic contemporary	RCA	
Belgium	May 28, 2010	Digital download	Sony Music	
Brazil	May 28, 2010	Digital download	Sony Music	
Norway	May 28, 2010	Digital download	Sony Music	
Portugal	May 28, 2010	Digital download	Sony Music	
Spain	May 28, 2010	Digital download	Sony Music	
Sweden	May 28, 2010	Digital download	Sony Music	
