= You Lost Me =

Single by Christina Aguilera

from the album Bionic
- Released: June 25, 2010
- Recorded: 2009
- Studio: The Red Lips Room (Beverly Hills, California)
- Length: 4:17
- Label: RCA
- Songwriters: Christina Aguilera; Sia Furler; Samuel Dixon
- Producers: Samuel Dixon; Sia Furler (vocals)

Christina Aguilera singles chronology
"Woohoo" (2010)	"You Lost Me" (2010)	"I Hate Boys" (2010)

Music video
- "You Lost Me" on YouTube

"You Lost Me" is a song by American singer Christina Aguilera from her sixth studio album Bionic (2010). It was written by Aguilera, Sia, and producer Samuel Dixon. "You Lost Me" was released on June 25, 2010 by RCA Records as the third single from Bionic. The track is a down-tempo ballad that talks about an unfaithful man, who has left Aguilera's world "infected".

"You Lost Me" was well received by most critics, who noted it as one of the album's outstanding songs and praised Aguilera's vocals on the track. The song had success in Israel and Taiwan, peaking in the top ten in those countries. Elsewhere, it reached numbers 43, 78, and 79 in South Korea, Slovakia, and the Netherlands respectively. In the United States, it peaked at number one on Billboard's Dance Club Songs chart.

The music video for the song was directed by Anthony Mandler. It was received positively by critics, who described it as a comeback by Aguilera following her video for Bionic's lead single "Not Myself Tonight" (2010). She performed "You Lost Me" on various television shows. The song has been covered by artists, including Veronica Rotin.

== Background and release ==
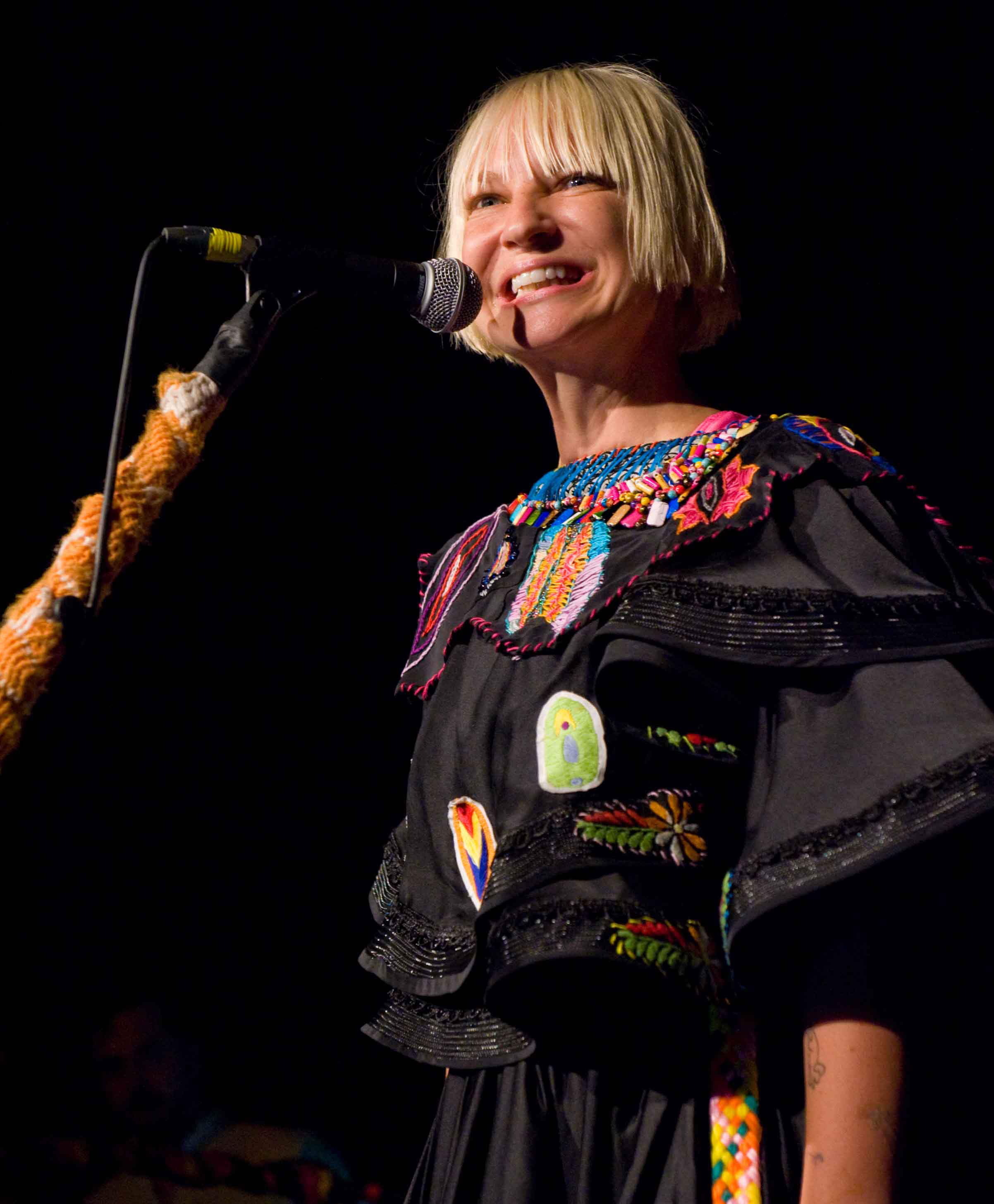
Sia (pictured) co-wrote "You Lost Me".

In August 2008, Australian singer Sia confirmed that she would work on several ballads for Aguilera's then-upcoming album. Aguilera commented about the collaboration, "I'm definitely a fan of Sia's. I was thrilled she also wanted to work together and, in turn, was a fan of mine". In an interview for Billboard, Sia said, "She [Aguilera] was just excited to get to work with the artists she loves. There's this misconception that she's a middle-America kind of person. But she's a little hipster. You go back to her house and sit by the fire with some wine, and what's playing over the sound system? The Knife and Arthur Russell. She doesn't listen to pop music".

In the standard edition of Bionic, the couple co-wrote three tracks, including "You Lost Me". The song was described as "the heart of the album" by Aguilera. According to the Herald Sun, Aguilera wanted to collaborate more with Furler for the album. "You Lost Me" was announced to be released as the third single in the US and the second internationally from Bionic, while "I Hate Boys" would be the second single in Australia. The single's cover artwork was revealed three days later via her official website. RCA Records officially released the song to US contemporary hit radio on June 27, 2010. A radio remix version of the track was digitally released on 7digital stores worldwide in July 2010. Two digital EPs containing remixes of the song were also distributed by RCA Records later that year.

== Composition ==
"You Lost Me"
A 25-second sample of "You Lost Me", a ballad that incorporates instrumentation that includes piano and strings. Lyrically, the song talks about a "cheating" man, who has left Aguilera's world "infected".

"You Lost Me" was written by Aguilera, Furler and its producer, Samuel Dixon. The song is a ballad lasts for a duration of 4:17 (four minutes and 17 seconds). Written in the key of A minor, "You Lost Me" has a tempo of 50 beats per minute. Aguilera's vocal range spans from E♭_{3} to E_{5}. The verses are sung by Aguilera using melisma. The song's instrumentation comes from piano and strings. Hinshaw Drew of The Village Voice labelled it the "un-bionic moment on the record".

Lyrically, "You Lost Me" talks about a "cheating" man, who has left Aguilera's world "infected". Amar Toor from AOL Radio thought that its lyrical content "perfectly captures one of the most difficult experiences young lovers have to go through". The song begins with a "somber orchestral" piano opening, followed by the lines "I am done, smoking gun/ We've lost it all, the love is gone" sung by Aguilera. During the chorus, she sings, "I feel like our world's been infected/ And somehow you left me neglected". Toward the ending, Aguilera's "painful" and "catharsis" voice "crescendos dramatically". According to Jon Pareles from The New York Times, Aguilera "barely" holds back her tears in the song. The Village Voice critic Drew Hinshaw thought that Aguilera is "less vexed by what he did than what he lost".

== Critical reception ==
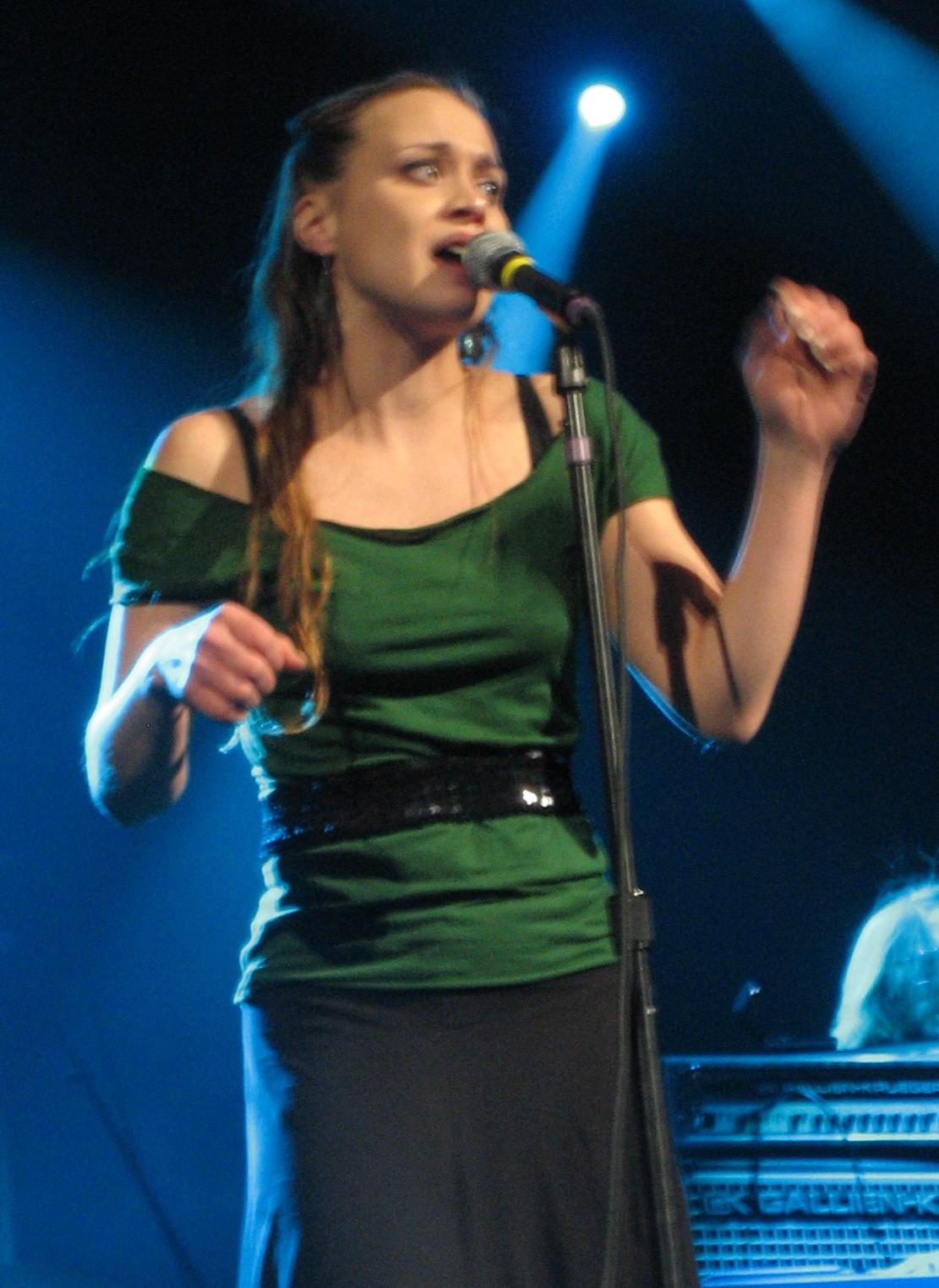
In the review for Entertainment Weekly the song was named "Fiona Apple-esque".

"You Lost Me" received generally positive reviews from music critics. Leah Greenblatt from Entertainment Weekly noted Furler's efforts on the "lovely" ballads "You Lost Me", "All I Need", and "I Am" had turned Aguilera into a "smoky, almost Fiona Apple-esque torch singer". She also considered the first one of them as "one of the most gorgeous things she’s [Aguilera] ever done". Elysa Gardner of USA Today highlighted the song as one of the album's standout ballads. According to Genevieve Koski from The A.V. Club, "You Lost Me" is the kind of ballad Aguilera "is best suited to". Mesfin Fekadu of Northwest Herald thought that the "emotional" song shows off "the diva's powerful voice", while Drew Hinshaw from The Village Voice deemed "You Lost Me" as the most vulnerable song from Bionic. Lindsay Zoladz, an editor of the Canadian magazine Cokemachineglow, wrote that the song was an "absolute stunner", adding that "her [Aguilera's] voice, minimally adorned, is free to showcase her amazing sense of control and kindle a subtle spectrum of emotion". In his revision for Entertainment Focus, Gary James called it "sublime" and opined it was impressively sung by Aguilera.

Michael Cragg, writing for musicOMH, stated that the ballads co-written by Sia make Bionic "the first Aguilera album where the ballads aren't ruined by her tendency to cover all the notes on the scale". Her further compared "You Lost Me" to Aguilera's previous hit "Beautiful" (2002). Digital Spy editor Robert Cospey gave the song three stars out of five, praising her vocals yet thinking that the song "somehow lacks the sincerity" as she displayed on "Hurt" and "Oh Mother". On a negative side, Sam Lansky from MTV Buzzworthy deemed "You Lost Me" a "weepy" song. It was ranked as one of 2010's best songs by Digital Dream Door. In his 2020 retrospective commentary on the album Bionic, Billboard's Glenn Rowley celebrated "You Lost Me" as a "soaring, oft-overlooked ballad". Daniel Megarry of the Gay Times complimented the song, calling it "a gorgeous, heartbreaking ballad about unfaithfulness that showed off the softer side of Christina’s legendary voice". Entertainment-related website Tan's Topic called it a "masterpiece", and recommended the official Hex Hector/Mac Quayle remix of the song. Alim Kheraj from Attitude labelled "You Lost Me" as "introspective, beautiful and emotionally-charged". Sarah Afshar placed it at number seven on a top ten list of songs by Aguilera for AXS. "You Lost Me" also won the You Choice Award for Best Ballad/Love Song.

== Chart performance ==
In the United States, "You Lost Me" debuted and peaked on the Bubbling Under Hot 100 Singles chart at number 20 on June 26, 2010, becoming Aguilera's first US single not to chart within the main Billboard Hot 100. The song also peaked at number 28 on the Adult Contemporary, where it remained for four weeks. It was a success on the Hot Dance Club Play, peaking atop the chart. In the United Kingdom, "You Lost Me" became Aguilera's lowest-charting single in the country, only peaking at number 153 on the UK Singles Chart. The single also charted at number 78 in Slovakia, and number 79 in the Netherlands. The song was more commercially successful in Belgium, where it charted at number 19 on the Wallonian Ultratop chart. The song was also one of the 10 most played songs on the Israeli radio for several weeks.

== Music video ==
The music video for "You Lost Me" was directed by Anthony Mandler. According to Aguilera, the video "strips back the theatrics". She also revealed that it used over 200 pounds of charcoal. During the making of the video, Aguilera said, "It was really important that I interpret the simplicity of the raw emotion that takes place within the song itself and not any sort of theatrics involved". On July 22, 2010, the music video was released on Aguilera's VEVO channel. Two days before the release, a sneak peek of the music video was revealed. According to Billboard writer Monica Herrera, the clip contrasts with the music video for the lead single of Bionic "Not Myself Tonight", while Chris Ryan for MTV Buzzworthy thought that it goes "back to basics".

The video features Aguilera with "strawberry-blonde" hair. It begins with a close-up of a gun barrel. Then, she slowly walks through a "deserted" bedroom and lies down in the room, which is filled with charcoal, while crying. She is seen with mascara streaming down her cheeks. As the scene moves on, Aguilera is fighting against a muscular, shirtless man, who is considered her lover when he tries to get her up before Aguilera pushes him. The clip ends as Aguilera takes off her shirt in an "Inception-like dreamworld" as her black clothing turns to white. Critical response to "You Lost Me" video was positive: Latina writer Mariela Rosario and UK magazine OK! noted that the clip was a comeback by Aguilera following the video for Bionic lead single "Not Myself Tonight". Monica Hererra from Billboard also thought that it represents "a kind of return to form for Aguilera". Writing for Entertainment Weekly, Brad Wete thought that the video for "You Lost Me" "has some quality material". Similarly, MTV Buzzworthy's Chris Ryan complimented it as one of Aguilera's best videos ever. It was nominated for the You Choice Award in the Best Pop Video category.

In May 2020, as a result of the "#JusticeforBionic" social media campaign, the song's music video reached number one positions on the iTunes Top 100 Videos charts in multiple countries, including Brazil, France, the Philippines, the United Kingdom, and the United States. The video received a Vevo Certified Award on YouTube for over 100 million views.

== Live performances and promotion ==
Aguilera performed "You Lost Me" for the first time at the season finale of the ninth season of American Idol on May 26, 2010. Following the rendition of Aguilera's songs "Beautiful" and "Fighter" by the top six female contestants, Aguilera appeared onstage as the stage went dark. Wearing a "demure black ensemble", her hair was pulled back in her curls. On June 8, 2010, Aguilera performed the song again — during The Today Show — with several of her tracks, "Fighter", "Bionic", "Not Myself Tonight", and "Beautiful". According to James Dinh from MTV News, the performance of "You Lost Me" "brought a subtle and gentle ambience" to the show, and it was not aired on television.

During the Late Show with David Letterman aired on June 10, 2010, the singer performed "You Lost Me" with "1950s-inspired hair", red lipstick, "diamante leggings" and a white "glitter style cut-out blouse" with "red sparkly stilettos". A day later, she appeared on The Early Show to promote her then-upcoming album Bionic, performing "Not Myself Tonight", "Fighter", "You Lost Me", and a medley of "Genie in a Bottle" and "What a Girl Wants". Aguilera performed the song again as part of her performance on VH1 Storytellers, aired on June 13, 2010. The song has been used in the episode of HBO's comedy-drama series Entourage, titled "Louse Yourself". It features a cameo from Aguilera who performs "You Lost Me" at Ari Gold's (Jeremy Piven) party. The episode originally aired on September 12, 2010. Aguilera also included the song on her setlist at a Halloween concert in San Diego in October 2010.

== Formats and track listings ==
Digital remix single

1. "You Lost Me" (Radio Remix) – 4:19

Digital EP

1. "You Lost Me" (Radio Remix) – 4:19
2. "You Lost Me" (Hex Hector/Mac Quayle Remix Radio Edit) – 3:38

Digital remix EP

1. "You Lost Me" (Radio Remix) – 4:19
2. "You Lost Me" (Hex Hector/Mac Quayle Remix Radio Edit) – 3:37
3. "Not Myself Tonight" (Laidback Lude Radio Edit) – 3:39
4. "You Lost Me" (music video) – 4:25

== Credits and personnel ==
Recording

- Recording and vocals recording – The Red Lips Room in Beverly Hills, California

Personnel

- Christina Aguilera – vocals, songwriter
- Sia Furler – songwriter, vocal producer
- Samuel Dixon – songwriter, recording, piano
- Jimmy Hogarth – recording, acoustic guitar
- Felix Bloxsom – drums, percussion
- Oliver Kraus – recording, arranging, strings
- Cameron Craig – recording
- Oscar Ramirez – vocal recording

Credits adapted from Bionic album liner notes.

== Charts ==
Chart (2010)	Peak position
Belgium (Ultratip Wallonia)	19
Global Dance Tracks (Billboard)	25
Israel (Media Forest)	10
Netherlands (Single Top 100)	79
Romania (Romanian Top 100)	81
Slovakia Airplay (ČNS IFPI)	78
South Korea International (Gaon)	43
Taiwan (Hito Radio)	8
UK Singles (Official Charts)	153
US Bubbling Under Hot 100 Singles (Billboard)	20
US Adult Contemporary (Billboard)	28
US Dance Club Songs (Billboard)	1

== Release history ==
Region	Date	Version(s)	Format(s)	Label(s)	Ref.
Russia	June 25, 2010	Original	Contemporary hit radio	Sony Music	
United States	June 27, 2010	Original	Contemporary hit radio	RCA	
Belgium	July 2, 2010	Remix	Digital download	Sony Music	
Italy	July 2, 2010	Remix	Digital download	Sony Music	
Netherlands	July 2, 2010	Remix	Digital download	Sony Music	
Finland	July 5, 2010	Remix	Digital download	Sony Music	
Norway	July 5, 2010	Remix	Digital download	Sony Music	
Canada	July 6, 2010	Remix	Digital download	Sony Music	
Spain	July 6, 2010	Remix	Digital download	Sony Music	
United States	July 6, 2010	Remix	Digital download	RCA	
Austria	July 9, 2010	Remix	Digital download	Sony Music	
Germany	July 9, 2010	Remix	Digital download	Sony Music	
Various	July 30, 2010	Various	Digital download (EP)	RCA	
Switzerland	August 20, 2010	Remix	Digital download	Sony Music	
Germany	September 3, 2010	Various	CD	Sony Music	
United Kingdom	October 17, 2010	Various	Digital download (EP)	RCA	

== See also ==
- List of number-one dance singles of 2010 (U.S.)
