= 2010 MTV Movie Awards =

American awards show

- Date: Sunday, June 6, 2010
- Location: Gibson Amphitheatre, Universal City, California
- Country: United States
- Hosted by: Aziz Ansari
- Website: http://www.mtv.com/ontv/movieawards/2010/

Television/radio coverage
- Network: MTV
- Produced by: Mark Burnett
- Directed by: Joe DeMaio

The 2010 MTV Movie Awards was the 19th annual ceremony which took place on June 6, 2010, at the Gibson Amphitheatre in Universal City, California. Aziz Ansari served as a host for the ceremony. Voting the nominees began from a list of eligible contestants on March 29, 2010, and ended on April 9, 2010. The nominees itself were announced on May 12, 2010, and the winners were voted by the public.

MTV, MTV2, and VH1 all broadcast the ceremony simultaneously; the three networks combined for a viewership of 5.8 million, down from 5.9 million viewers last year.

The show gained controversy for constant use of the term "fuck" and its derivatives by its presenters and Peter Facinelli, who accepted the Best Movie award, a number of which were not muted due to its live format. Parents Television Council president Tim Winter, responding to the program's TV-14 rating, stated: "It is an outrage to the content rating system. If it had been a motion picture, it would have been rated R. The fact that it was rated 14 shows what little respect MTV and Viacom have for the content ratings."

== Performers ==
- Ed Helms, Ken Jeong, Tom Cruise (as his Tropic Thunder, character Les Grossman), and Jennifer Lopez — Dance Medley of Jennifer Lopez's Get Right and Ludacris's Get Back
- Katy Perry and Snoop Dogg — "California Gurls"
- Christina Aguilera — Medley: "Bionic/Not Myself Tonight/Woohoo"

== Presenters ==
- Adam Sandler, Kevin James, Chris Rock, David Spade, and Rob Schneider — presented Best Female Performance
- Jonah Hill, Russell Brand, and Sean "Diddy" Combs — presented Best Breakout Star
- Steve Carell and Paul Rudd — presented Best Scared-As-Shit Performance
- Bradley Cooper and Jessica Biel — presented Best Kiss
- Jason Segel and Miranda Cosgrove — introduced Katy Perry and Snoop Dogg
- Betty White, Bradley Cooper, and Scarlett Johansson — presented MTV Generation Award
- Michael Cera, Kieran Culkin, Anna Kendrick, and Aubrey Plaza — presented Best WTF Moment
- Samuel L. Jackson, Eva Mendes, Dwayne Johnson, Mark Wahlberg, and Will Ferrell — presented Best Villain
- Jackie Chan, Jaden Smith, and Shaun White — presented Biggest Badass Star
- Jessica Alba and Vanessa Hudgens — presented Best Male Performance
- Christopher Mintz-Plasse and Ed Helms — introduced Christina Aguilera
- Zac Efron — presented Best Comedic Performance
- Cameron Diaz and Tom Cruise — presented Best Movie

== Awards ==
Best Movie
The Twilight Saga: New Moon; Alice in Wonderland; The Hangover; Harry Potter and the Half-Blood Prince; Avatar
Best Male Performance	Best Female Performance
Robert Pattinson – The Twilight Saga: New Moon; Zac Efron – 17 Again; Taylor Lautner – The Twilight Saga: New Moon; Daniel Radcliffe – Harry Potter and the Half-Blood Prince; Channing Tatum – Dear John	Kristen Stewart – The Twilight Saga: New Moon; Sandra Bullock – The Blind Side; Amanda Seyfried – Dear John; Zoe Saldaña – Avatar; Emma Watson – Harry Potter and the Half-Blood Prince
Best Breakout Star	Best Villain
Anna Kendrick – Up in the Air; Quinton Aaron – The Blind Side; Max Records – Where the Wild Things Are; Logan Lerman – Percy Jackson & the Olympians: The Lightning Thief; Chris Pine - Star Trek; Gabourey Sidibe – Precious	Tom Felton – Harry Potter and the Half-Blood Prince; Helena Bonham Carter – Alice in Wonderland; Ken Jeong – The Hangover; Stephen Lang – Avatar; Christoph Waltz - Inglourious Basterds
Best Comedic Performance	Best Scared-as-S**t Performance
Zach Galifianakis – The Hangover; Sandra Bullock – The Proposal; Bradley Cooper – The Hangover; Ryan Reynolds – The Proposal; Ben Stiller – Night at the Museum: Battle of the Smithsonian	Amanda Seyfried – Jennifer's Body; Max Records – Where the Wild Things Are; Jesse Eisenberg – Zombieland; Katie Featherston – Paranormal Activity; Alison Lohman – Drag Me to Hell
Best Kiss	Best Fight
Kristen Stewart and Robert Pattinson – The Twilight Saga: New Moon; Sandra Bullock and Ryan Reynolds – The Proposal; Zoe Saldaña and Sam Worthington – Avatar; Kristen Stewart and Dakota Fanning – The Runaways; Taylor Swift and Taylor Lautner – Valentine's Day	Beyoncé vs. Ali Larter – Obsessed; Robert Downey Jr. vs. Mark Strong – Sherlock Holmes; Hugh Jackman and Liev Schreiber vs. Ryan Reynolds – X-Men Origins: Wolverine; Logan Lerman vs. Jake Abel – Percy Jackson & the Olympians: The Lightning Thief; Sam Worthington vs. Stephen Lang – Avatar
Best WTF Moment	Biggest Badass Star
Naked Trunk Surprise – Ken Jeong (from The Hangover); Bill Murray?! A Zombie?! – Bill Murray (from Zombieland); Racetrack Premonition – Bobby Campo (from The Final Destination); Unexpected Transformation – Isabel Lucas (from Transformers: Revenge of the Fallen); Vomits a Mysterious Black Ooze – Megan Fox (from Jennifer's Body)	Rain; Angelina Jolie; Chris Pine; Channing Tatum; Sam Worthington
Global Superstar
Robert Pattinson; Taylor Lautner; Johnny Depp; Daniel Radcliffe; Kristen Stewart

=== MTV Generation Award ===
- Sandra Bullock

== Notable moments ==
- When Robert Pattinson and Kristen Stewart won the best kiss, they repeated the same performance back on MTVMA 2009, promising a kiss in front of the fans. Kristen at first tried to leave the fans hanging, but Robert stole a kiss from her.
- When Sandra Bullock won MTV Generation, she discussed her divorce and the fact that no one needed to worry about, and after that, she kissed Scarlett Johansson.

== Sneak Peeks ==
- Harry Potter and the Deathly Hallows
- The Twilight Saga: Eclipse
- The Last Airbender
- Scott Pilgrim vs. the World
- Jersey Shore (season 2)
