= Bleu (musician) =

American singer-songwriter (born 1975)

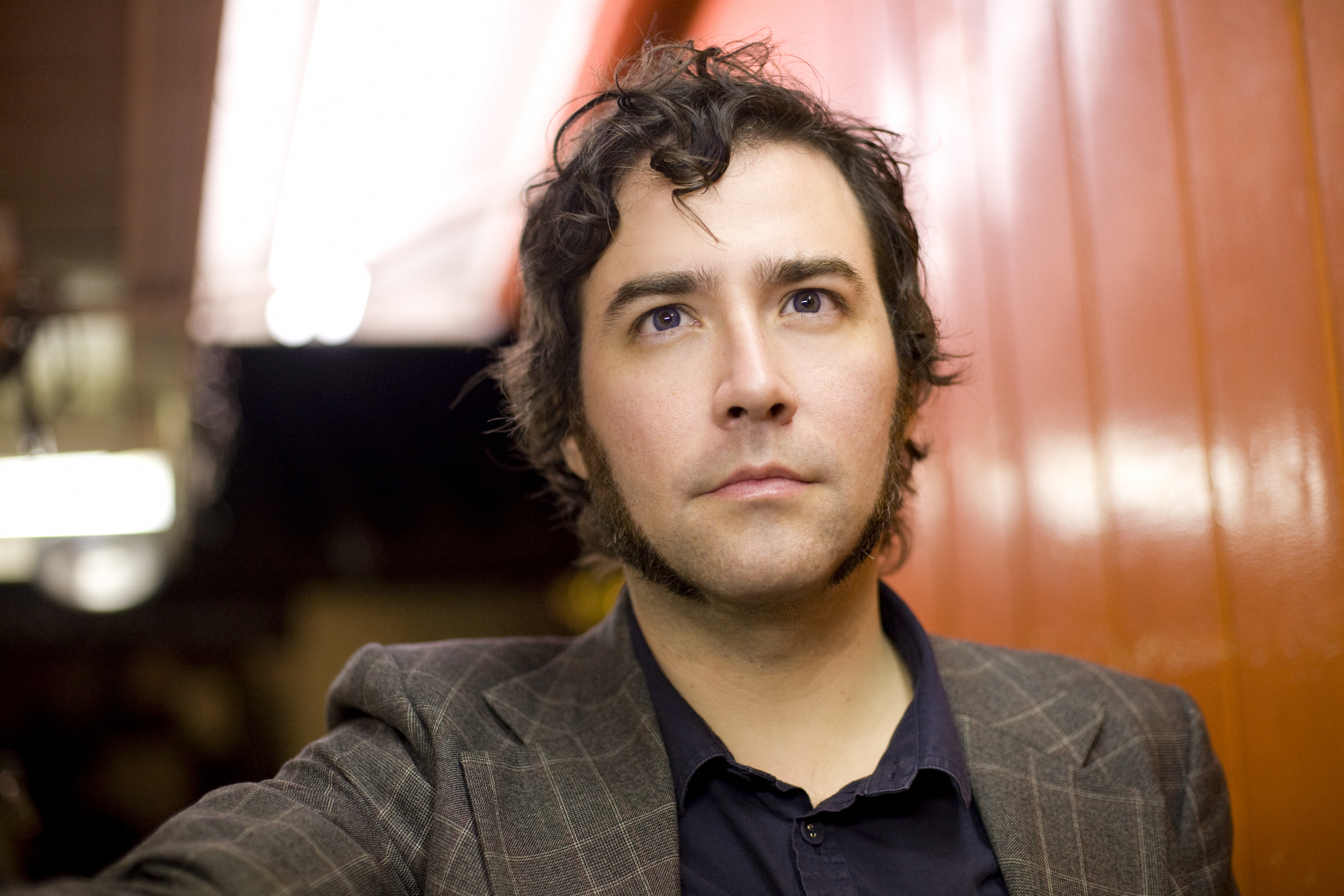
- Bleu in Los Angeles

Background information
- Also known as: Bleu
- Born: William James McAuley III; July 18, 1975 (age 51)
- Origin: United States
- Genres: Power pop; pop; rock; indie; acoustic
- Occupations: Musician; singer; songwriter; producer
- Instruments: Vocals; guitar; piano; bass
- Years active: 1999–present
- Labels: Lunch Records; Aware Records; Columbia Records; EMI; Artist Garage; Lojinx; The Major Label
- Website: www.bleutopia.com

William James McAuley III (born July 18, 1975), alias Bleu, is an American musician and a record producer. He has written and produced songs for Demi Lovato, Selena Gomez, John Oates, Michelle Branch, Hey Violet, Big Freedia, and the Jonas Brothers, and has won multiple Independent Music Awards for his work with Air Traffic Controller.

In addition to his solo act, for which he was signed to Columbia Records, McAuley has been in a number of bands over the years, including a duo with Alexz Johnson called Johnson & McAuley, Electric Light Orchestra-style power pop band LEO, and a Mutt Lange homage super-group called LoudLion with Taylor Locke of Rooney and Allison Robertson of The Donnas.

McAuley's songs have been featured on soundtracks like Spider-Man and The Hills Have Eyes 2. In 2014, he wrote and produced all the soundtrack songs for Tinker Bell and the Legend of the Neverbeast, one of which is a duet featuring himself and KT Tunstall on vocals.

== Career ==
=== Early career ===
Bleu graduated from the Berklee College of Music in Boston, Massachusetts. Bleu was known in the local Boston music scene for his live shows and work with other musicians, and received some local fame for his debut effort A Bing Bang Holidang, which was a charity benefit for the Boston Institute for Arts Therapy. A single from that record, "Boston All Star 12 Dayz," received some local airplay, featuring famous local musicians and acts from Guster and The Mighty Mighty Bosstones as well as Kay Hanley of Letters to Cleo and Bill Janovitz.

Bleu would soon follow with his Workaday Day EP before releasing his first proper album, Headroom. Released via Lunch Records, it received generally positive reviews, but did not take off until Bleu's entry into the WBCN Rock & Roll Rumble, which he won in 2001. This led him to local opening slots with Jump, Little Children and Ben Folds. He would later win a Boston Music Award for "Best Boston Band" (as well as be nominated for 5 in his career), and land a major label contract.

=== Redhead ===
Bleu's next album, Redhead (called "an all around power pop treat" by music critic Aidin Vaziri), was released in 2003 on Aware Records. Two versions were released; both featured the song "Somebody Else," which was also on the Spider-Man soundtrack. The first version of the album featured a song, "Sayonara," which had backing vocals from Puffy AmiYumi, and the latter version (released on Columbia Records) contained the single "Get Up," which received moderate national airplay. The album was also released in Japan with the Puffy AmiYumi guest spot featured, followed by a short tour in Japan.

=== Departure from label, Alpacas Orgling, and other projects ===
Bleu parted ways with Aware Records after a public dispute about the direction of submitted demos, and his third studio album, tentatively titled A Watched Pot, was not released by the label.

In 2006, a side project with Matt Mahaffey of Self called L.E.O. was released. Featuring contributions from Mike Viola, Andy Sturmer (formerly of Jellyfish), Hanson, and Jason Scheff of Chicago, Alpacas Orgling was meant to be similar to 1970s AM radio pop music, and is described by the band as an "alt-pop version of the Traveling Wilburys."

In July 2007, Bleu released two EPs on iTunes. One is a collection of songs he wrote for friends and family members for their birthdays, simply titled Happy Birthday. The other is credited to the band Blizzard of '05 (also the name of the album). The 7-song EP was recorded by Bleu, some friends, and some former bandmates when they converted the basement of one of their houses into a recording studio, and holed up there during the Blizzard of '05, which swept across New England and shut down the city of Boston for five days.

In July 2008, Bleu and frequent collaborators Mike Viola and Ducky Carlisle released Aquavia as a band called The Major Labels.

Also in 2008, Bleu regained the rights to A Watched Pot. It was released on July 14, 2009, through Artist Garage and Fontana Distribution.

Another side project is a take on 80s rock called LoudLion (plays covers and originals), which planned to release a CD in 2011.

Bleu is also an in-demand songwriter and producer, working with such artists as Demi Lovato, Selena Gomez, Big Freedia, the Jonas Brothers, Boys Like Girls, and Michelle Branch among many more major label and independent acts.

=== Four ===
In August 2010, Bleu made the decision to use Kickstarter to fund the release of his already recorded fourth album in the US. (UK label Lojinx had agreed to release the album in Europe.) Fan contributions reached the target of $8000 within 10 hours and went on to raise a total of $39,645 to support the release and marketing of the album in America. Kickstarter named the campaign Best Music Project in the 2010 Kickstarter Awards.

The new album, titled Four, was released on CD in Europe on October 25 on Lojinx and on November 2 in North America on Bleu's own "The Major Label" imprint. The European digital release date was November 29.

=== To Hell With You ===
In November 2012, a crowdfunding for Bleu's fifth record started at pledgemusic.com. The campaign ended October 24, 2013, and was even more successful than Four. One of the many offers from the campaign was the Redhead Record Club. It consisted of re-recorded songs from Redhead for its 10th anniversary. The songs were released individually in digital form. In 2014, the re-recorded collection on CD was made available exclusively for pledgers.

The official release of To Hell With You was January 28, 2014.

=== Tinker Bell and the Legend of the Neverbeast ===
In 2014, McAuley wrote and produced all of the soundtrack songs for Disney's Tinker Bell and the Legend of the NeverBeast. KT Tunstall performed vocals on each song, with McAuley lending his vocals for a duet with Tunstall on "1000 Years." The director of the film, Steve Loter, had been listening to McAuley's music on his commute to the studio, and ended up approaching McAuley after one of his shows to ask him to work on the film.

=== SiX TAPE ===
Bleu's sixth studio album, the self-produced SiX TAPE, was released in August 2021. Musical inspirations cited by the artist include ELO, Prince, Dire Straits and Carl Carlton. Contributors include Lindsey Ray and co-writers Taylor Locke (Rooney/Sparks/Train) on “Never Believe It” and Isaac Bolivar aka Izzy Fontaine (Seal/Banks) on “My Emo GF.” Session musician Jesse McGinty is credited as co-writer and instrumentalist on “Baby By Your Side,” “Love You So” and “A Crazy Life!”

== Discography ==
=== Songwriting and production discography ===
Year	Artist	Title	Label	Role
2022	NCT Dream	"Fire Alarm"	SM Entertainment	Producer
2018	Jesse Saint John	"Fake It"	We Are the Guard Records	Writer, producer, mixer
2018	Big Freedia	"Rent"	Asylum Records	Writer
2018	Addie Hamilton	"Hell or Highwater"	Self-released	Producer, writer, mixer
2017	Air Traffic Controller	Echo Papa EP	Self-released	Producer, writer, mixer
2017	Michelle Branch	"Heartbreak Now" {(Hopeless Romantic)	Verve Label Group	Writer
2017	Addie Hamilton	"Judge and Jury"	Self-released	Producer, writer
2017	Addie Hamilton	"La La La"	Position Music	Producer, writer
2016	Josh Kaufman	Josh Kaufman EP	Self-released	Producer, mixer; writer (all songs except "Avalanche")
2016	Johnson & McAuley	Johnson & McAuley EP	Self-released	Artist, producer, mixer; writer (all songs except "The Promise")
2016	Air Traffic Controller	Black Box	Self-released	Producer, mixer (all songs), writer ("People Watching," "Phantom," "The House," "Warrior," "Water Falls")
2015	Bleu (ft. guest vocalists Justin Tranter, Alexz Johnson, and more)	To Hell With You	Self-released	Artist, producer, writer, mixer
2015	Hey Violet	"Smash into You" (I Can Feel It EP)	Capitol Records	Writer
2015	Tinker Bell and the Legend of the NeverBeast soundtrack	"Float," "1000 Years," "Strange Sight," "Strange Sight Reprise," (all featuring KT Tunstall) additional score Tinker Bell and the Legend of the NeverBeast soundtrack	Walt Disney Records	Producer, writer, instrumentalist; featured artist ("1000 Years")
2015	John Oates	"Dirty Business" (Another Good Road)	Elektra Nashville	Producer, writer
2014	LoudLion	Die Tough	Self-released	Producer, writer, mixer
2014	Alexz Johnson	"Thank You For Breaking My Heart" (Heart EP)	Laydee Spencer Music	Writer
2013	Mike Taylor	"DWNTWN KDS"	Self-released	Producer, writer, mixer
2013	Marc Martel	"Our Love Remains," "Perfect World," "8th Wonder" (The Prelude EP)	Be Music & Entertainment	Co-producer, writer
2013	Happy Endings soundtrack	"Ordinary Extraordinary Love"	Madison Gate Records	Producer, writer, mixer
2012	Daniel Powter	"Crazy All My Life" (Turn on the Lights)	EMI UK	Writer
2012	Ryan Beatty	"Simple Song" (Because of You EP)	OcSkee Entertainment	Writer
2012	Air Traffic Controller	NORDO	Sugarpop Records	Producer, mixer; writer ("You Know Me")
2012	After School	"Rip Off" (Playgirlz)	Avex Trax	Producer, writer
2012	Meat Loaf	"Fall From Grace" (Hell in a Handbasket)	Sony Music	Writer
2012	Chris Mann	"Unless You Mean It" (Roads)	Universal Republic	Producer, writer, engineer
2012	Chris Mann	"Oh Come All Ye Faithful" (Home For Christmas EP)	Universal Republic	Producer, engineer
2012	Tristan Prettyman	"Unconditionally," "Come Clean" (Cedar + Gold)	Capitol Records	Writer
2011	Demi Lovato	"In Real Life" (Unbroken)	Hollywood Records	Producer, writer, mixer
2011	Drake Bell	"Terrific," "Big Shot," "Speak My Mind" (A Reminder EP)	Drake Bell Entertainment	Co-producer
2009	Selena Gomez & the Scene	"I Won't Apologize" (Kiss and Tell)	Hollywood Records	Writer
2009	Selena Gomez	"Disappear" (Wizards of Waverly Place (soundtrack))	Walt Disney Records	Writer, co-producer
2009	Kate Voegele	"Say Anything" (A Fine Mess)	Interscope Records	Writer
2009	Ace Enders & a Million Different People	"When I Hit The Ground" (title track)	Vagrant Records	Writer
2007	Jonas Brothers	"That's Just the Way We Roll" (Jonas Brothers)	Hollywood Records	Writer
2007	LoudLion	Theme song, The Hills Have Eyes 2 soundtrack	Bulletproof Records	Producer, writer, mixer
2007	Hanson	"Go," "Running Man" (The Walk)	3CG, Cooking Vinyl	Writer; producer ("Running Man")

=== Artist discography ===
- A Bing Bang Holidang (1999)
- Headroom (2000)
- Redhead (2003)
- A Watched Pot (2009)
- Four (2010)
- Besides (2012)
- To Hell With You (2014)
- SiX TAPE (2021)

=== EP's ===
- Workaday Day (2000)

== Awards ==
- 2002 Boston Music Awards: Best Rock Band (indie label)
- 2010 Boston Music Awards: Best Boston Artist That Doesn't Live in Boston
- 11th Independent Music Awards: Four – Best Pop Album
- 15th Independent Music Awards: Best Music Producer
- 15th Independent Music Awards: Black Box – Best Indie Album
- 16th Independent Music Awards: Echo Papa – Best Rock EP
