= Let There Be Love (Christina Aguilera song) =

Promotional single by Christina Aguilera

from the album Lotus
- Released: January 14th 2012
- Studio: MXM Studios (Stockholm) and The Red Lips Room (Beverly Hills, California)
- Genre: EDM; pop; Eurodance
- Length: 3:21
- Label: RCA
- Songwriters: Max Martin; Karl Schuster; Savan Kotecha; Bonnie McKee; Oliver Goldstein; Oscar Holter; Jakke Erixson
- Producers: Max Martin; Shellback

Music video
- "Christina Aguilera – Let There Be Love" on YouTube

"Let There Be Love" is a song recorded by American singer Christina Aguilera for her seventh studio album, Lotus (2012). It was written and produced by Max Martin and Shellback, with additional writing from Bonnie McKee, Oliver Goldstein, Oscar Holter and Jakke Erixson. Having originally collaborated with other producers in her earlier works, Aguilera stated that the "full circle" her career had taken became the right time to work with Martin. The song combines EDM and pop music genres, and is influenced by electronica and trance. Its instrumentation incorporates synths, drums and electronics.

"Let There Be Love" garnered positive reviews from music critics. Many praised Aguilera for not over singing and delivering a solid vocal performance, while others complimented the musical structure and composition. The song peaked at number 132 on the South Korea international singles chart following the release of the album, number five on the Ultratip (Bubbling Under) chart in Wallonia (Belgium), and at number one on the US Dance Club Songs chart. It was the second-most played song of 2013 in clubs in the US.

On August 29, 2013, an accompanying music video for the song was released on Aguilera's official channel. It features cameo appearances from Nicole Richie, Christina Milian, Chris Mann, Aguilera's son Max Bratman and her current boyfriend Matthew Rutler. The video sees everybody makes the "L" sign for the word "love", alongside positive messages, such as "Racism sucks", "Accept", and "Amo a mi hijo gay" ("I love my gay son"). It was described as a "soulful, and completely inexplicable, letter to her fans thanking them for their undying love". To promote Lotus and the song, Aguilera performed "Let There Be Love" at the 40th American Music Awards and on The Voice in the United States.

== Background and recording ==
Recorded at MXM Studios by Shellback in Stockholm, Sweden, "Let There Be Love" was written by Max Martin, Savan Kotecha, Bonnie McKee, Oliver Goldstein, Oscar Holter and Jakke Erixson. It was produced by Martin and Shellback. Aguilera's vocals were recorded by Oscar Ramirez at The Red Lips Room in Beverly Hills in California; the background vocals engineer was Sam Holland. Programming and keyboards were carried out by Shellback and additional keyboards were performed by Holter, Erixson and Martin.

According to McKee, the song was originally intended for Miley Cyrus. Cyrus heard the song after it had already been written and expressed interest in reworking portions of the lyrics, but Martin declined to make substantial changes, feeling the song was already complete. The collaboration ultimately did not move forward. Discussing Aguilera’s interpretation of the song, McKee shared, “the way that she emotes on that song really brings it to life,” and described the collaboration as particularly meaningful given Aguilera’s influence on her as a songwriter.

== Composition and lyrics ==
Christina Aguilera – "Let There Be Love"
A 19 second audio sample of "Let There Be Love"

"Let There Be Love" combines a multitude of genres. It is a dance-pop, EDM, pop, and Eurodance song. It also contains electronica and trance influences. Aguilera's vocals here span from G_{3} to F_{5}. It lasts for a duration of three minutes and 22 seconds. The instrumental consists of "a propulsive beat and chewy synths", as well as "loud drums" and "overwhelming" electronica. According to Kitty Empire for The Guardian, the song is "about as formulaic as club pop gets" but "resonates effectively." Andrew Hampp for Billboard compared the song's instrumental to two songs recorded by Usher, "DJ Got Us Fallin' in Love" and "Scream", both of which were produced by Martin. He also noted that Aguilera was probably aware that the "Let There Be Love"'s melody bared strong resemblances to the songs, which most likely prompted her to spend "the last minute wailing all over the place." Aguilera "roars" the lyrics "Let there be let there be love/ Here in the here in the dark" over trance beats and projects a "saucy" tone as she sings ""Hit the right spot, making my eyes roll back."

== Critical reception ==
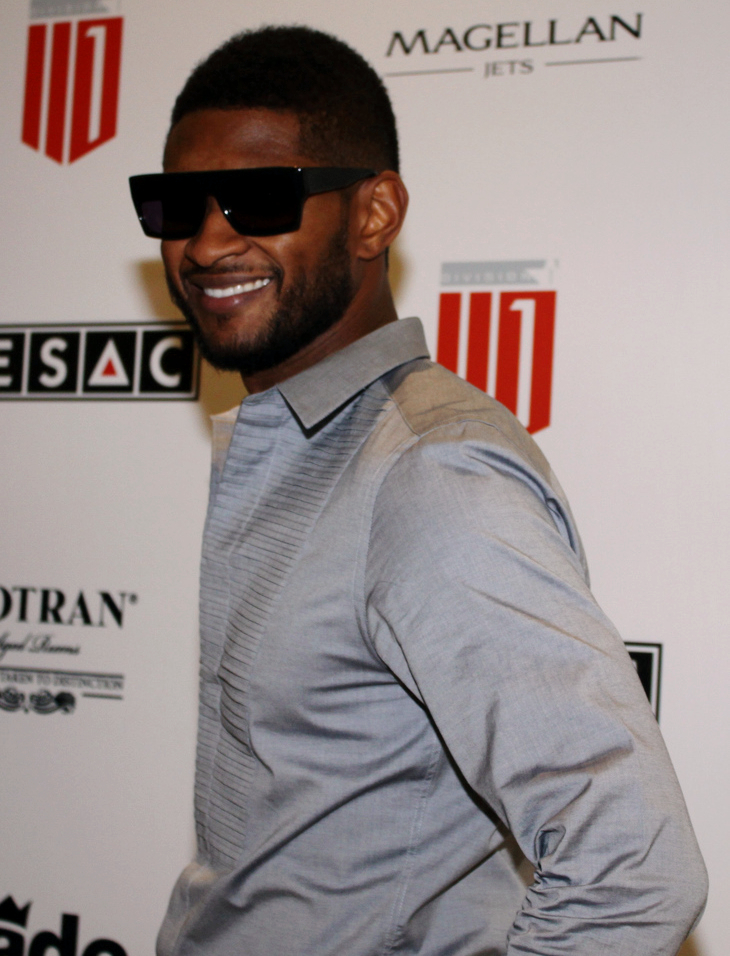
"Let There Be Love" was compared to songs recorded by Usher, "DJ Got Us Fallin' in Love" and "Scream", both of which were produced by Max Martin.

"Let There Be Love" garnered positive reviews from music critics. Stephen Thomas Erlewine for Allmusic complimented Aguilera's approach to the song, writing that she sounds "comfortable" and "fresh," while Andrew Hampp for Billboard wrote that it is a club friendly song but does not show much personality. Chris Younie for 4Music thought that it is obvious from the "initial stabs of synth" that "Let There Be Love" will resonate "Ibiza type" beats. He continued to write that Aguilera had managed to create a "dance anthem" without the assistance of Calvin Harris. The Huffington Post writer Mesfin Fekadu thought that Martin's production of "Let There Be Love" was superior to "Your Body", citing it as "typical" but potentially successful on radio. Jim Farber for New York Daily News praised the song, writing that it is "a prime disco diva anthem".

MTV News writer Christina Garibaldi praised the uptempo track, writing that its "heavy beat" and "sultry lyrics" were perfect for people to dance to in nightclubs. Jenna Hally Rubenstein for MTV Buzzworthy noted that it is easy to become addicted to listening to "Let There Be Love", and that Aguilera's vocals "prevail above the noise." Michael Gallucci for PopCrush thought that the song was not quite as good as "Your Body" and described it as "typical pop." However, he criticized Aguilera's vocal performance, stating that her "big voice" should be able to be heard above the instrumental.

Slant Magazine's Sal Cinquemani thought that "Let There Be Love" would have been a better lead single choice than "Your Body", as she felt it would have ensured Aguilera a greater comeback. Cinquemani described the song as "a virtual hybrid of recent club bangers by Rihanna, Britney, Katy, and Ke$ha." Robert Copsey for Digital Spy thought that the song's weakness is also its strength, describing it as "a massive clubby raveathon that is ultimately throwaway, but in the best possible way." Annie Zaleski for The A.V. Club criticized the song as "faceless Top 40 EDM." Melissa Maerz of Entertainment Weekly found the "bouncy peace-flag-waver" lyrics of the song contradictory and difficult to comprehend because of "a bonus track called 'Shut Up' that invites the haters to 'suck my [dick].'" Christopher Rosa from The Celebrity Cafe placed it at number five on the list of Aguilera's ten best songs ever, calling it "euphoric" and a "pure pop genius".

== Music video ==
=== Conception ===
The music video for "Let There Be Love" was premiered on Aguilera's official channel on YouTube on August 29, 2013. The clip was official released few hours after she posted a 2000-word thank you message to fans on her official website on August 28, 2013. A part of the letter reads,

I may get quiet at times, but when I do have something to say, I mean every word. I decided to share my thoughts with you at length and tell you openly how I feel. Thank you for filling my soul with melody and song … lyrics and love … and giving me a safe place I feel comforted in being brave enough to always bare my soul and come from an honest and genuine place. Be fearless enough to be a conversation piece … Speak your own truth… As always, thank you for accepting me for who I am. Being human – flaws and all.

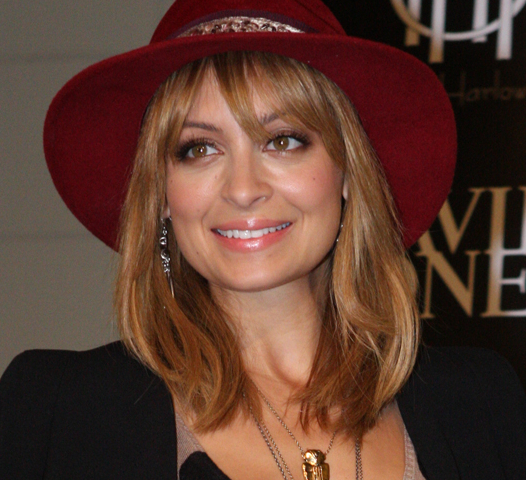
Nicole Richie appears in the music video.

The music video for "Let There Be Love" was filmed in a DIY style. In the music video, Aguilera is seen in her one-piece swimsuit with the world "love" written all over it. It also featured guest appearances from Nicole Richie, Christina Milian, Chris Mann, Shannon Holtzapffel, Aguilera's son, Max Bratman, and her current boyfriend Matthew Rutler. The video begins with Aguilera' message, "Hey everybody, Chrisitina here just thanking you guys so much for filling my life and my heart with so much love continued throughout the years... Standing by me, I appreciate all your support, this one is just for you". Everybody is seen joking around with another friend as they make the "L" sign for "love" with their hands, as well as holding up signs with positive messages such as "Don't judge", "Equality", "Racism sucks", "Just be", and "Amo a mi hijo gay" ("I love my gay son"), while Aguilera's son Bratman "shows off his dancing chops". At the end, Aguilera blows a kiss to the camera.

=== Reception ===
Upon its release, the music video for "Let There Be Love" garnered acclaim from media outlets. Lily Harrison from E! Online labelled it "nothing short of adorable". Similarly, John Walker for MTV Buzzworthy named it "flawless". New York Daily News writer Rachel Maresca complimented on Aguilera's new figure, "she looks happier and healthier than ever as she bops around smiling ear-to-ear in swimsuits showing off her trimmed-down figure", while Allison Takeda from US Weekly commented that Aguilera's look in the video is "slim and gorgeous". Malene Arpe for the Toronto Star was positive toward the clip, calling it a "perfect antidote to a week of thinking about the Miley Cyrus/Robin Thicke porn circus". She continued, "Aguilera's new video is so sweet and innocent and full of goodwill towards humanity, it will make you forget all about twerking and foam fingers and the inherent greasiness of Robin Thicke". Nina Terrero for NBC Latino compared the video for "Let There Be Love" to Aguilera's previous video for "Beautiful" (2002) for the same positive portrayal of the LGBT community.

== Live performances ==
Aguilera performed "Let There Be Love" for the first time at the 40th American Music Awards on November 18, 2012, held at the Nokia Theatre in Los Angeles, California. Aguilera sang "Let There Be Love" as part of a medley with two other tracks from Lotus: "Lotus Intro" and "Army of Me". During an interview with MTV News, Aguilera said:

It's very exciting. It's definitely going to be a reflection of what Lotus means to me. If you take that album cover and give it a little performance twist, I'll bring that album cover to life, so it's going to be really fun. I can't give too much away about the songs, but it's definitely going to represent the album because the album is very multilayered. It doesn't represent 'Your Body' as a single tone. It has its ballads; and everything comes from a very sincere, deep–rooted place whether it's having fun or being vulnerable.

Bruna Nessif for E! Online described the performance as "interesting," and noted that the theme "to celebrate everyone for who they are" was similar to the moral content presented on Gaga's album Born This Way (2011). As Aguilera finished her set, she was joined on stage by Pitbull to perform his song "Feel This Moment", on which she is a featured artist. Aguilera also performed "Let There Be Love" with her team of aspiring singers on The Voice, a singing competition on which she is a coach.

== Credits and personnel ==
Recording

- Recorded at MXM Studios, Stockholm, Sweden.
- Vocals recorded at The Red Lips Room, Beverly Hills, CA.

Personnel

- Songwriting – Max Martin, Savan Kotecha, Bonnie McKee, Oliver Goldstein, Oscar Holter, Jakke Erixson
- Production – Max Martin, Shellback
- Recording – Shellback
- Vocal recording – Oscar Ramirez
- Background vocals engineer – Sam Holland
- Programming and keyboards – Shellback
- Additional keyboards – Oscar Holter, Jakke Erixson, Max Martin

Credits adapted from the liner notes of Lotus, RCA Records.

== Chart performance ==
Upon the release of Lotus, "Let There Be Love" debuted on the South Korea Gaon Single Chart at number 132 during the week of November 11 to 17, 2012. In the United States, the song debuted at number 44 on the Dance Club Songs chart on February 18, 2013. It reached number one with the issue dated June 1, 2013. With "Let There Be Love" attaining the number one position on the chart, it upped her total tally to seven number-one songs, and the second from Lotus to reach the peak, after "Your Body" in December 2012.

=== 2012 charts ===
Chart (2012)	Peak position
South Korea (Gaon)	132
South Korea International Singles (Gaon)	92

=== 2013 charts ===
Chart (2013)	Peak position
Belgium (Dance Top 50)	22
Belgium (Ultratip Wallonia)	5
Global Dance Tracks (Billboard)	24
US Dance Club Songs (Billboard)	1

=== Year-end charts ===
Chart (2013)	Position
US Dance Club Songs (Billboard)	2

== See also ==
- List of number-one dance singles of 2013 (U.S.)
