= Besides =

Besides may refer to:

- Besides (EP), a 1999 EP by Do Make Say Think
- Besides (Over the Rhine album), 1997
- Besides (Sugar album), 1995
- Besides (Cold Chisel album), 2011
- Besides (Bleu album), 2011
