= Air traffic controller (disambiguation) =

An air traffic controller is a professional responsible for the coordination of traffic in their assigned airspace.

Air Traffic Controller may also refer to:

- Air Traffic Controller (band), an indie rock band
- Air Traffic Controller (series), a series of simulation video games
- Air Traffic Controller (video game), 1978 video game unrelated to the series
