= BIAT =

BIAT may refer to:

- Biat language, a variation of Mnong
- Banque Internationale Arabe de Tunisie
- Boston Institute for Arts Therapy; see A Bing Bang Holidang
- British Institute of Architectural Technologists, an earlier name for the Chartered Institute of Architectural Technologists

== See also ==
- Sent Biat, the Gascon name for Saint-Béat, Haut-Garonne, France
- Biate (town), a town in India
