= L.E.O. (band) =

Background information
- Genres: Alternative Rock, Indie Pop
- Years active: 2006
- Labels: Cheap Lullaby Records; Victor Entertainment
- Members: Bleu McAuley; Mike Viola; Andy Sturmer; Jason Scheff; Steve Gorman; Matt Mahaffey; John Fields; Tony Goddess; Hanson; Eric Barao; Scott Simons; Paula Kelley

L.E.O. is a 2006 project by Boston musician Bleu and collaborators which produced Alpacas Orgling, a 2006 album of original songs similar in style to Electric Light Orchestra (ELO), the Traveling Wilburys, and 1970s AM radio pop music.

== Formation ==
In 2002 Bleu was chatting with the former frontman of Semisonic, Dan Wilson. Wilson retold details from producer Rick Rubin about Jeff Lynne's studio methods and techniques. Bleu, interested in these techniques and ELO in general, wanted to make songs similar to Jeff Lynne using his studio methods for fun. Gradually those songs would develop in to the album Alpacas Orgling. Mike Viola joined the project after an onstage cover of ELO's "Telephone Line" by Bleu and Viola at the Paradise Lounge in Boston.

The name "L.E.O." is based on the letters in "ELO". However according to Bleu, the letters in L.E.O. could stand for "Little Electric Operas", or "Little E-mail Operas".

== Alpacas Orgling ==
Their debut album, Alpacas Orgling, features major contributions from Matt Mahaffey of Self, Andy Sturmer of Jellyfish, Hanson, Mike Viola, and members of Chicago. The album was remotely recorded by the musicians over the course of 4 years in 12 different studios. The album's name is an acknowledgement of alpaca farmer and Extreme's bassist Pat Badger, who previously gave Bleu a place to live.

Bleu would go on a release tour for Alpacas Orgling, tour venues included T.T. the Bear's Place.

The album was well received. Alpacas Orgling was number 8 on Entertainment Weekly's "must list". Brian Mansfield of USA Today said, …"Bleu McAuley's supergroup side project does the Electric Light Orchestra better than Klaatu did The Beatles". In his 4 of out 5 star review, Stewart Mason of AllMusic wrote, …"Alpacas Orgling is the single best album any of its major participants have ever taken part in". CityBeat gave the album an A−, praising Bleu for infusing his own "creative spark" with "a timeless pop era". Prefix Magazine dismissed the album as a "terrible idea". In January 2007 "Ya Had Me Goin'" peaked at 57 on the Tokio Hot 100 in Japan.

== Discography ==
Studio Album

Title	Album details
Alpacas Orgling	Released: October 17, 2006 (US) · January 24, 2007 (JPN); Label: Cheap Lullaby Records (US) · Victor Entertainment (JPN); Format: CD

Music Video

Year	Song	Creator	Album
2007	"Goodbye Innocence"	Beth Jean	Alpacas Orgling
