= Make the World Move =

2021 dance song recorded by Christina Aguilera

Song by Christina Aguilera featuring CeeLo Green

from the album Lotus
- Studio: Westlake Recording Studios (Los Angeles, California); The Red Lips Room (Beverly Hills, California)
- Genre: Dance; soul; R&B
- Length: 2:59
- Label: RCA
- Songwriters: Alexander Grant; Mike Del Rio; Candice Pillay; Jayson DeZuzio; Dwayne Abernathy; Armando Trovajoli
- Producers: Alex da Kid; Jayson DeZuzio; Mike Del Rio

Licensed audio
- "Make The World Move" on YouTube

"Make the World Move" is a song recorded by American singer Christina Aguilera for her seventh studio album, Lotus (2012). It features guest vocals from Cee Lo Green. The song was written by Alexander Grant, Mike Del Rio, Candice Pillay, Jayson DeZuzio, Dwayne Abernathy and Armando Trovajoli. Musically, the track is an up–tempo inspirational song, which combines dance, R&B and soul genres. Lyrically, it is a positive attitude song which features horns and synthesizers as part of its instrumentation.

"Make the World Move" received a mixed response from music critics; some were complimentary of Aguilera and Green's performance, although others felt that the track is weak compared to other songs on Lotus. Upon the release of the album, the song debuted at number 123 on the South Korean international singles chart. Aguilera and Green performed "Make the World Move" on the third season of The Voice, a singing competition show on which they are both a coach.

== Background and Development ==
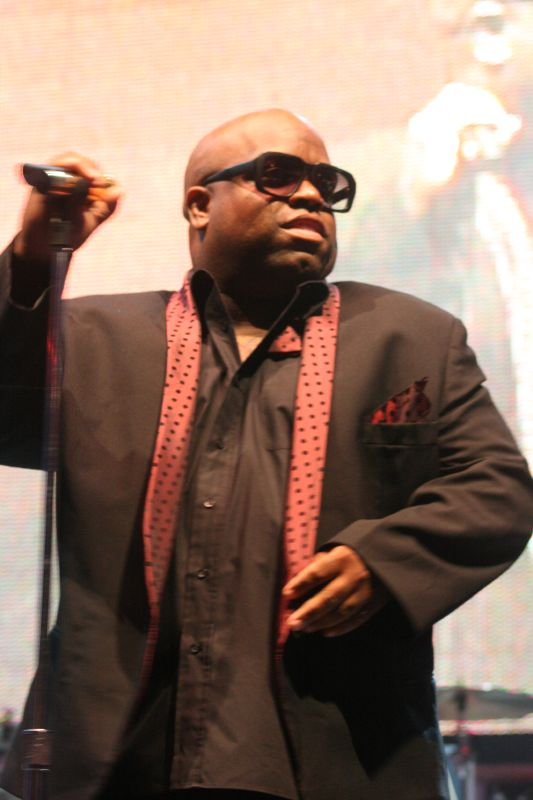
Fellow The Voice coach, Cee Lo Green, is featured on "Make the World Move"

In April 2011, it was announced that Aguilera and Green were collaborating on a song. A demo track, entitled "Nasty", leaked online and was later confirmed to be an unused song from Aguilera's soundtrack album Burlesque. In May, Green revealed that they had recorded "Nasty" prior to becoming judges on The Voice. The same month, Green was asked about the song in an interview with Billboard; he explained: "It's a song for her album. I won't disclose the title, because it could possibly be a working title ... You know, but we've talked about it amongst ourselves and I'm gonna go in on it and work it out. It'll be the second song we've done." Despite not revealing the title of the song, he confirmed that Aguilera's vocals on the track were finished.

In April 2012, Aguilera confirmed that she and Green had worked on a new track entitled "Make the World Move" and described it as "positive" and "full of life." Regarding the collaboration, she said: "I'm just excited to share the stage with Cee Lo because we both get off on production and dancers and having all of those fun elements about being on stage and being a performer ... So the two of us together joining forces is going to be huge!" When asked if "Make the World Move" would be released as a single, Aguilera replied saying that she was not sure about what would be done with the song. In an interview with MTV News in November, Aguilera explained how she felt the song would be suited to Green as she felt a male vocal contribution was needed, saying: "I got to collaborate with my good buddy Cee Lo ... There was a part for a potential male vocal on the chorus, and I just heard immediately Cee Lo's voice on it, his signature Cee Lo, and it was fun collaborating with him and having him on my record and us joining forces together."

== Production and composition ==
"Make the World Move" was written by Alexander Grant, Mike Del Rio, Candice Pillay, Jayson DeZuzio, Dwayne Abernathy and Armando Trovajoli, with production done by Grant credited with his professional name, Alex da Kid, Del Rio and DeZuzio Aguilera was involved with the song's vocal production, along with Pillay. Lucas Secon, co-writer and producer of another Lotus track "Red Hot Kinda Love", served as the programmer and arranger. The song was recorded by Josh Mosser while Aguilera and Green's vocals were recorded by Oscar Ramirez and edited by Del Rio. The song contains a portion of the composition "Let's Find Out", written by Armando Trovajoli. "Make the World Move", an up–tempo and "old school" inspirational song which consists of dance, R&B and soul genres, and lasts for a duration of 2:59 (two minutes and 59 seconds). Demonstrating a sense of "sassiness" and "power" in her vocal performance, Aguilera sings the positive attitude lyrics, "The time is now/ No time to wait/ Turn up the love/ Turn down the hate" over what Robert Copsey of Digital Spy called a "bonkers arrangement" which consists of "horn blasts" and "plinky synths." Instrumentation also consists of a "brassy, big-band arrangement."

== Critical reception ==
"Make the World Move" received a mixed response from music critics. Stephen Thomas Erlewine of Allmusic described the collaboration between Aguilera and Green as a "pulsating party," while Andrew Hampp for Billboard described the song as "a barn-storming party anthem". Hampp was complimentary of the song's arrangement, writing that it is something that would have worked well on Aguilera's fifth studio album, Back to Basics (2006), which features prominent 1940's music influences. He praised da Kid's production, writing that he has bought a 1940s inspired song into the "2010s". Annie Zaleski of The A.V. Club wrote that the "Make the World Move" is "a dizzying duet" and is "downright inspiring." Sarah Rodman for The Boston Globe demonstrated admiration for the song, writing that it is "impossible-to-resist." Newsday's Glenn Gamboa was brief in her review of the track, writing that the song is "playful."

In comparison to the previous track on Lotus, "Red Hot Kinda Love", Chris Younie for 4Music wrote that "Make the World Move" is "not the same", but "by no means hugely different." Younie continued to say that the song is "a bit retro and a bit modern" and "a bit underground but a bit mainstream." While he praised the chorus and its memorability, Younie labelled the track as being "lack–lustre following 'Red Hot Kinda Love'". Sarah Godfrey of The Washington Post described the song as a "strange" dance version of Buffalo Springfield's "For What It's Worth". Robert Copsey wrote that the song did not fulfill his expectations. Michael Gallucci for PopCrush noted that as the fourth song on the album, it "keeps the party going", but is forgettable. The Huffington Post's Mesfin Fekadu criticized "Make the World Move", along with album tracks "Around the World" and "Red Hot Kinda Love", for failing to capture the "fun" in which they are supposed to embody.

== Live performance ==
Aguilera and Green performed "Make the World Move" for the first time together on the third season of The Voice on November 13, 2012. Opening the show, the set consisting of two red chairs on which each singer sat on, as well as a balcony for Green. Green wore a striped polo shirt, while Aguilera sported a "purple Afro wig and plastic tiara."

== Credits and personnel ==
Recording

- Recorded at Westlake Studios, Los Angeles.
- Vocals recorded at The Red Lips Room, Beverly Hills, California

Sample

- Contains a portion of the composition "Let's Find Out" written by Armando Trovajoli

Personnel

- Vocals - Christina Aguilera
- Songwriting – Alexander Grant, Armando Trovajoli, Candice Pillay, Dwayne Abernathy, Jayson DeZuzio, Mike Del Rio
- Production – Alex Da Kid, Jayson DeZuzio, Mike Del Rio
- Vocal production - Christina Aguilera, Candice Pillay
- Programming – Lucas Secon
- Arranging – Lucas Secon
- Recording – Josh Mosser
- Vocal recording – Oscar Ramirez
- Vocal editing – Mike Del Rio
- Vocals (featuring) – Cee Lo Green
- Additional vocals – Mike Del Rio

Credits adapted from the liner notes of Lotus, RCA Records.

== Charts ==
Upon the release of Lotus, "Make the World Move" debuted on the South Korean singles chart at number 88 during the week of November 11 to 17, 2012, due to digital download sales of 2,999.

Chart (2012)	Peak position
South Korea (Gaon Weekly Download Chart: International)	88
South Korea (Gaon Weekly Digital Chart: International)	123
