= Redhead (album) =

Studio album by Bleu
- Released: 2003
- Genre: Power pop; pop rock; alternative rock; indie rock
- Label: Columbia; Aware
- Producer: John Fields, Bleu

Bleu chronology
Headroom (2000)	Redhead (2003)	A Watched Pot (2009)

Professional ratings
Review scores
Source	Rating
AllMusic	4/5 stars

Redhead is the major label debut album by Bleu. Released by the Columbia Records imprint Aware Records in 2003, the two versions featured various songs, including the single "Get Up," the song "Somebody Else" from Spider-Man, and "I Won't Go Hollywood" from American Dreamz and Win a Date With Tad Hamilton!. The song "Sayonara" from the original release features backing vocals from Puffy AmiYumi.

== Track listing ==
The two versions have different track listings. The first was an internet/live-show only release, the second more general.

The Japanese version features a different mix of "Sayonara," as well as the extra track "Just a Song," co-written by Matt Mahaffey of Self.

=== Original release ===
1. "I Won't Go Hollywood"
2. "Somebody Else"
3. "We'll Do It All Again"
4. "Searchin' for the Satellites"
5. "Could Be Worse"
6. "Watchin' You Sleep"
7. "Somethin's Gotta Give"
8. "Sayonara"
9. "You Know, I Know, You Know"
10. "Feet Don't Fail"
11. "Trust Me"
12. "Ursula Major, Ursula Minor"
13. "3's a Charm"
14. "Dance Dance Babydoll Dance" (Hidden Track)

=== Re-release ===
1. "Get Up"
2. "I Won't Go Hollywood"
3. "That's When I Crash"
4. "We'll Do It All Again"
5. "Searchin' for the Satellites"
6. "Could Be Worse"
7. "Watchin' You Sleep"
8. "Somethin's Gotta Give"
9. "Somebody Else"
10. "You Know, I Know, You Know"
11. "Trust Me"
12. "3's a Charm"
13. "Feet Don't Fail" (Hidden Track)
14. "Dance Dance Babydoll Dance" (Hidden Track)
