= Besides (Bleu album) =

Studio album by Bleu
- Released: 2011
- Genre: Indie Rock
- Length: 55:54
- Label: The Major Label
- Producer: Bleu

Bleu chronology
Four (2010)	Besides (2011)	To Hell With You (2014)

Besides is a B-Sides & rarities record by Bleu with unreleased songs from "A Watched Pot" and "Four". Besides was released on vinyl, CD and digital.

There are two editions, a blue 150g vinyl (limited with 100 copies) which will be signed and a black 150g vinyl (limited with 300 copies).

== Track listing ==
Vinyl

SIDE - B

1. Take Cover
2. When The Other Shoe Falls
3. No Such Thing As Love [Original Version]
4. Can't Be That Bad (If It Feels This Good)
5. The Blame Game
6. How Blue [Acoustic Mix]
7. When The Dog Day Comes

SIDE - Be (sides)

1. If
2. Blow Up The Radio
3. A Watched Pot
4. Mailman's Son
5. In Love With My Lover [Demo]
6. Save It For A Rainy Day

Digital download (with the vinyl package)

1. Take Cover
2. When The Other Shoe Falls
3. No Such Thing As Love [Original Version]
4. Can't Be That Bad (If It Feels This Good)
5. The Blame Game
6. Don't Take It Personally
7. How Blue [Acoustic Mix]
8. If...
9. When The Dog Day Comes
10. Blow Up The Radio
11. A Watched Pot
12. Mailman's Son
13. In Love With My Lover [Demo]
14. Save It For A Rainy Day
