= Roads (album) =

Studio album by Chris Mann
- Released: October 30, 2012
- Recorded: July 2012
- Genres: Vocal pop; classical crossover; traditional pop
- Length: 46:46
- Label: Universal Republic
- Producers: Keith Thomas; Marco Marinangeli; Marius de Vries; Joel McNeely; Walter Afanasieff; Bill Appleberry

Chris Mann chronology
Chris Mann EP (2011)	Roads (2012)	Home for Christmas (2012)

Singles from Roads
- 1. "Roads"; 2. "Unless You Mean It"

Roads is the debut studio album by American recording artist Chris Mann, released on October 30, 2012, by Universal Republic. Mann participated in the season two of the singing reality show The Voice, ultimately placing fourth, but being the first of the second season to release an album. The album was produced by Keith Thomas, Marco Marinangeli, Marius de Vries, Walter Afanasieff and others.

"Roads" is a vocal pop, classical crossover and traditional pop album, with covers from Lady Antebellum, Damien Rice, Coldplay and Frank Sinatra, as well as new songs. It also features classic covers, such as "Always on My Mind" and "Ave Maria". The album also features vocals from his coach on The Voice, the American recording artist Christina Aguilera.

== Background ==
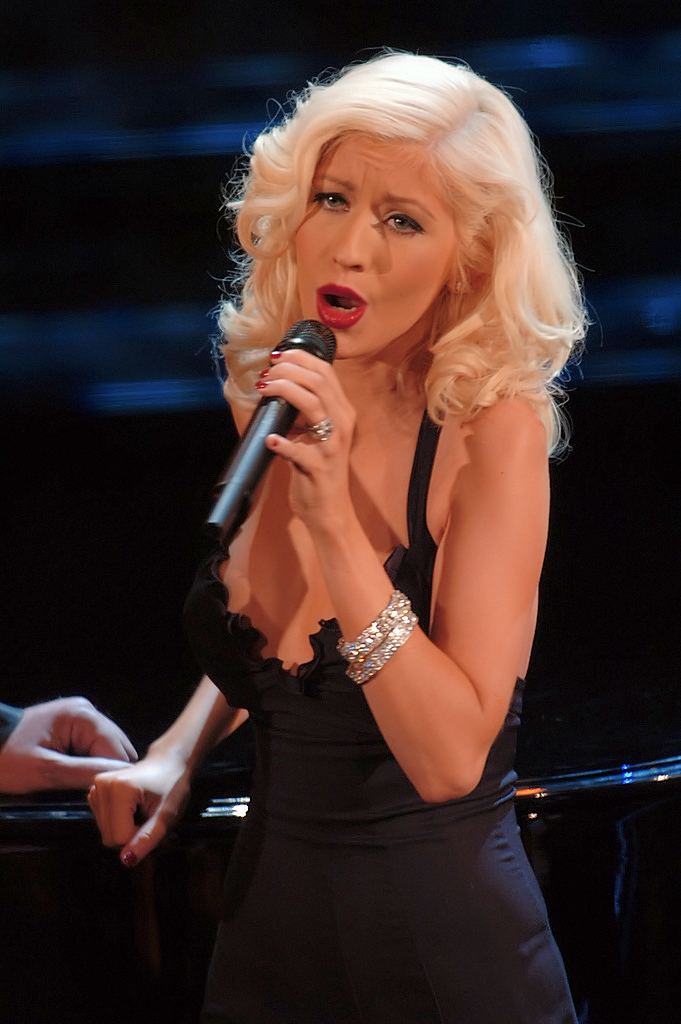
Mann's coach on The Voice (Christina Aguilera, pictured) is featured on a cover of "The Blower's Daughter" by Damien Rice.

A classically trained singer, Chris Mann came to the public's attention while appearing as a contestant on the second season of NBC's singing reality show The Voice in 2012. However, Mann had already released 2 self-titled extended plays, the first being in 2009 and the second in 2011. While auditioning for The Voice, Mann was initially chosen by judges Christina Aguilera and CeeLo Green after singing Andrea Bocelli's "Because We Believe (Ama Credi E Vai)". He chose to be part of Team Christina Aguilera, on whose team he had hoped to be selected from the start. Mann was ultimately placed fourth, behind winner Jermaine Paul, runner-up Juliet Simms, and third-place finisher Tony Lucca. However, it was enough to give him a ready fan base and a recording contract with Universal Republic, ultimately releasing his debut solo album, Roads.

== Recording ==
Roads is a vocal pop, classical crossover and traditional pop album, featuring covers, as well as new songs. The first track and lead single is a brand new song, also called "Roads". Lyrically, it talks about staying on your own path while dealing with life's uncertainties. Mann also received co-writing credits on some songs such as "Cuore", co-written by Savan Kotecha and Marco Marinangeli, and on "Falling", co-written by Liz Rose and Keith Thomas.

Mann also covered a handful of tracks. He covered three recent hit tracks: Lady Antebellum's "Need You Now", Damien Rice's "The Blower's Daughter" (which features his coach on The Voice, Christina Aguilera) and Coldplay's "Viva La Vida" (which he already sang on The Voice). Mann also recorded three classics: Frank Sinatra's "My Way", "Always on My Mind" and "Ave Maria".

== Critical reception ==
Professional ratings
Review scores
Source	Rating
AllMusic	3/5 stars

Matt Collar of AllMusic gave the album 3 out of possible 5 stars, writing that Roads is "a languid, passionate, and well-produced album, and beautifully showcases Mann's Vanderbilt University-trained vocal chops. Rather than attempt to shoe horn Mann's mature vocal aesthetic into a younger, teen- or dance-oriented sound, here we get a selection of thoughtful covers and originals that straddle the line between measured, adult contemporary radio styles and more of a classical crossover approach." Collar also wrote that the covers, such as "Need You Now" and "The Blower's Daughter", "rachet up the sweeping, cinematic qualities of the songs while allowing him plenty of room to shine." By the end of the review, he concluded that "Ultimately, Roads will not disappoint fans who championed Mann on The Voice."

== Track listing ==
No.	Title	Writer(s)	Producer(s)	Length
1.	"Roads"	Carl Björsell; Tebey Ottoh; Didrik Thott; Sebastian Thott	Keith Thomas	3:47
2.	"Need You Now"	Dave Haywood; Josh Kear; Charles Kelley; Hillary Scott	Thomas	4:03
3.	"Cuore"	Savan Kotecha; Chris Mann; Marco Marinangeli	Marco Marinangeli	5:22
4.	"The Blower's Daughter" (featuring Christina Aguilera)	Damien Rice	Marius de Vries	4:45
5.	"My Way"	Paul Anka; Claude François; Jacques Revaud; Gilles Thibaut	Joel McNeely (music); Thomas (vocals)	5:32
6.	"Unless You Mean It"	Bleu	Bleu	3:22
7.	"Always on My Mind"	Johnny Christopher; Mark James; Wayne Carson	Walter Afanasieff	4:11
8.	"On a Night Like This"	Dave Barnes	Afanasieff	4:29
9.	"Ave Maria"	Franz Schubert	Afanasieff	4:20
10.	"Falling"	Mann; Liz Rose; Keith Thomas	Thomas	3:23
11.	"Viva La Vida"	Guy Berryman; Jonathan Buckland; William Champion; Chris Martin	Bill Appleberry	3:32

== Charts ==
The album debuted at number 188 on the Billboard 200 chart, also debuting at number 4 on the Top Heatseekers chart.

Chart (2011)	Peak position
US Billboard 200	175
Top Heatseekers	1
Classical Albums	5
