= Blank Page =

2012 song by Christina Aguilera

Song by Christina Aguilera

from the album Lotus
- Recorded: November 9, 2012
- Studio: The Red Lips Room (Beverly Hills, CA); Human Feel Studios (Los Angeles, CA)
- Length: 4:04
- Label: RCA
- Songwriters: Christina Aguilera; Chris Braide; Sia Furler
- Producer: Chris Braide

Licensed audio

"Blank Page" is a song recorded by American singer-songwriter Christina Aguilera, taken from her seventh studio album, Lotus (2012). It was written by Aguilera, Chris Braide and Sia, with production done by Braide. Aguilera had worked with Furler on her previous two albums Bionic and Burlesque, both released in 2010. Following the release of Lotus, Aguilera revealed that Furler is one of her favorite people to work with and that she is very inspiring.

"Blank Page" is a minimalist piano-driven ballad that received frequent comparisons to Aguilera's 2002 single "Beautiful". It garnered strong critical acclaim from music critics, who praised its simplistic arrangement as well as Aguilera's raw and strong vocal performance on the song. Following the release of Lotus, it peaked at number 53 on the South Korea international singles chart. Aguilera performed the song live for the first time at the 39th People's Choice Awards, where she was awarded with the People's Voice Award.

== Development ==
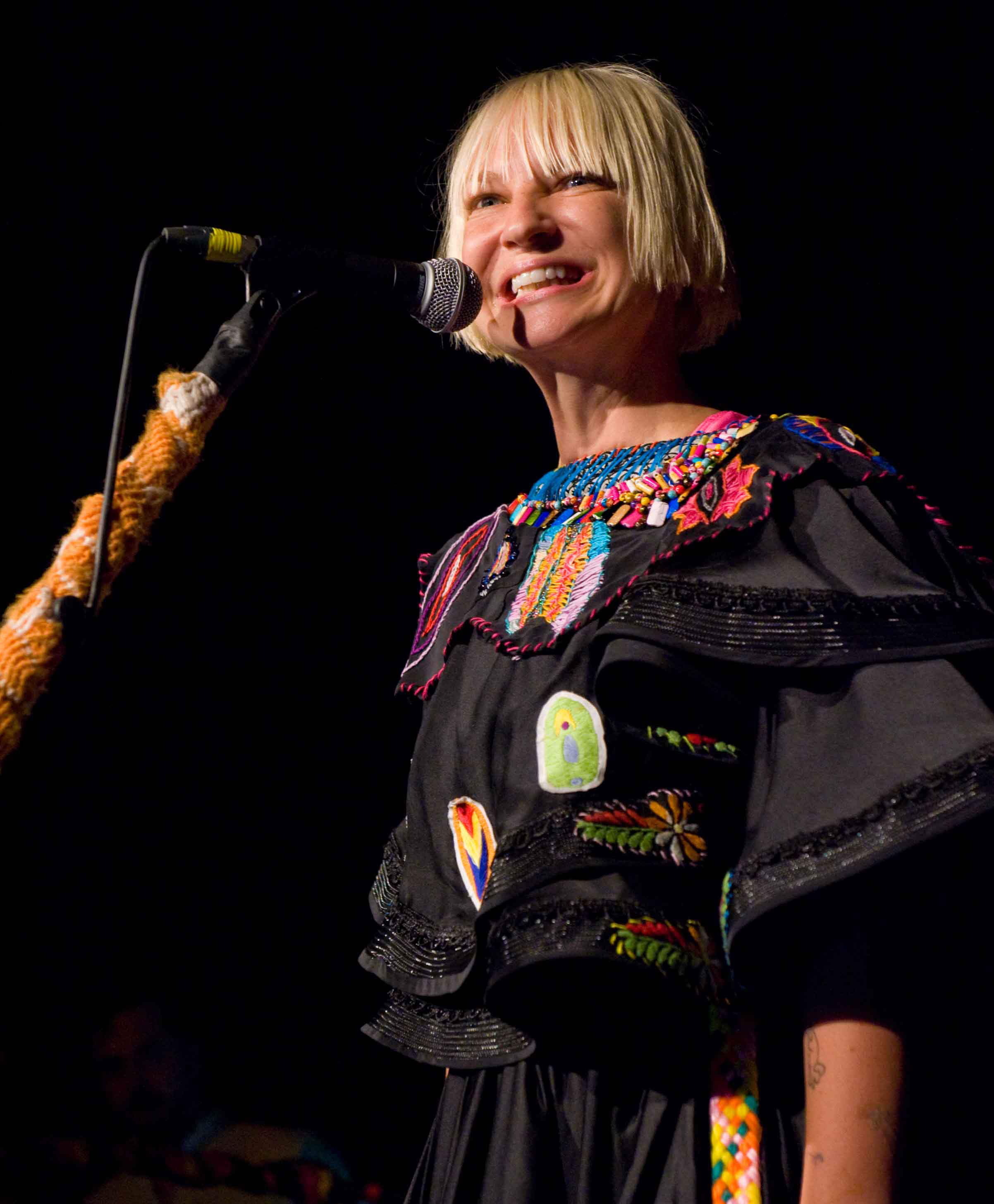
Australian singer-songwriter Sia is one of Aguilera's favorite people to collaborate with.

Lotus is the third album in which Aguilera and Furler have collaborated on material together for. They first worked together on Aguilera's sixth studio album, Bionic (2010), on the songs "You Lost Me" and "I Am", along with Samuel Dixon. "You Lost Me" was released as the final single from Bionic, and peaked at number one on the US Hot Dance Club Songs chart and number 28 on the Adult Contemporary. Later that year, they reunited to create a song to be included on the Burlesque soundtrack, which is called "Bound to You". It was nominated in the category of Award for Best Original Song at the 68th Golden Globe Awards in January 2011.

"Blank Page" was written by Aguilera, Sia and Chris Braide, the latter of whom also produced the song. Aguilera's vocals were recorded by Oscar Ramirez at The Red Lips Room in Beverly Hills in California. Braide provided the programming, string arrangement, piano and keyboards. Furler herself recorded a demo version of the song before Aguilera opted it for Lotus. In an interview with VEVO, Aguilera explained the collaborative process between Furler and herself, and why she likes to work with her: Sia and I always done amazing collaborations, she worked with me on the movie soundtrack 'Burlesque,' which we got a Golden Globe nomination for, we also did a lot of work on my 'Bionic' record, that was so sentimental, intimate and vulnerable feeling, and that's what I love about working with her". Aguilera was interviewed by Billboard when she attended the Billboard Film & TV Music Conference. She revealed that she views "Blank Page" as a more "vulnerable" version of her 2002 song, "Beautiful". When she was asked by the interviewer who her favorite people were to collaborate with, she responded by solely mentioning Furler and explained what led to her to enjoy working with her:

Sia is one of them. She comes in, singer-songwriter, she just writes the most beautiful amazing ballads. Now she is making a name for herself on a more broad commercial scale with a lot of more dance-driven stuff, and she is just an incredible singer. She came in and she just writes such serious songs, I was like 'Oh she is gunna [sic] be such a serious person, and I'm nervous to meet her, and I just want her to get me and understand that I'm not a cheesy pop star'. She comes in and she was all nervous, and she is the most bubbliest person in the world, but once she starts singing and getting into her thing, you're just sucked into this world of 'wow' and it's inspiring to be around people with such creative energy. I love that, that's the best experience.

== Composition and lyrics ==
"Blank Page" (2012)
A 23 second sample of "Blank Page". The song garnered frequent comparisons to Aguilera's 2002 single "Beautiful".

"Blank Page" is a simplistic piano arranged ballad, which lasts for a duration of 4:04 (four minutes and four seconds). It was written in the key of B flat major with a tempo of 115 beats per minute. Her vocal range spans from F_{3} to G_{5}. Lyrically, the song is about how Aguilera wishes to "wipe the slate clean" with a former lover and "reconcile an old romance". She knows that she has wronged him, but is asking to be given a second chance. Andrew Hampp for Billboard noted that this sentiment is revealed by Aguilera in the lyrics "If I could do undo that I hurt you/ I would do anything for us to make it through". The song begins with the chords of a piano as Aguilera sings "I know there's hurt/ I know there's pain/ But people change/ Lord, knows I've been no saint/ In my own way/ Regret choices I've made/ How I do I say I'm sorry?/ How do I say I'm sorry?." On the chorus, the lyrics are hopeful that she can right any wrongs she may have committed: "Draw me a smile, and save me tonight/ I'll be your blank page waiting for you to bring me to life/ Paint me a heart, let me be your art/ I am a blank page waiting for life to start/ Let our hearts start and beat as one together/ Let our hearts start and beat as one forever". The arrangement of the minimalist piano composition is "fiery" yet "spare". Aside from garnering innumerable comparisons to Aguilera's own song "Beautiful", the composition of "Blank Page" was subject to critique by Jim Farber writing for New York Daily News. He criticised the song for replicating the structure and lyrical content of "Someone Like You", a song performed by English singer-songwriter Adele:

Only two of the disc's 11 tracks attempt a genuine expression of vulnerability. Just one, 'Blank Page,' finds her looking inside and taking some blame. It's a pretty song, if one that blatantly rides Adele's coattails. Not only does 'Page' employ the same piano/voice arrangement as that star's 'Someone Like You,' Aguilera apes the precise length of Adele's notes.

== Critical reception ==
"Blank Page" garnered strong critical acclaim from music critics, many of whom praised its simplicity. Writing on behalf of 4Music, Chris Younie wrote that although "Blank Page" is followed by "Sing for Me", another ballad, the former is "utterly brilliant" and is "ten times better" than the latter. He continued to describe "Blank Page" as being "elegant and confessional". He praised her raw vocal performance and thought that should it be released as a single, it would have no problem matching the success of "Beautiful". Stephen Thomas Erlewine of AllMusic complimented the simplicity of the song, writing that Aguilera "seizes the spotlight" and is accompanied by a "spare" piano arrangement. PopCrush critic Michael Gallucci described the song as a "showstopper" and compared it to "Beautiful" due to its minimalist structure. He further that it is a "classic Aguilera performance" as she employs vocal acrobatics. Writing for Billboard, Andrew Hampp thought that "Blank Page" is more likely to reach a wider audience rather than the songs Aguilera wrote with Furler on Bionic ("You Lost Me" and "I Am", which he described as "underrated"), because of how both of their celebrity profiles have been raised since Bionic's release in 2010. Mesfin Fekadu for The Huffington Post concurred with Hampp in the respect that she also thought that "Blank Page" was reminiscent of the songs co-written by Furler on Bionic, which she also described "that album's highlight".

Jon Caramanica of The New York Times thought that "Blank Page", along with "Sing for Me", depicted "flashes of the old Aguilera" and that her "voice veers volcanic" on the songs as she raise the key as the songs progress. Annie Zaleski of The A.V. Club praised 'Blank Page' and 'Sing for Me', writing that "they are minimal piano ballads on which Aguilera discusses working through regret and reclaiming her sense of self, respectively. The spare music lets her still-powerful voice dominate, and her impassioned delivery conveys how meaningful these songs are to her." Sarah Godfrey of The Washington Post commented that the song "is about hackneyed metaphors and big notes — just the sort of combination that will appeal to fans of Aguilera's signature song 'Beautiful'". That Grape Juice praised the song and noted: "Rousing, resonant, and lyrically astute, this has etched itself onto the list of Xtina's most moving musical moments."

According to PopDust editor Jason Scott, the song features some of "the most accomplished vocal nuances of her [Aguilera's] career. At times, she tears mountains apart, and in other moments, she weaves a brittled and silky web." Scott ranked "Blank Page" on the list of Aguilera's ten best songs.

== Live performances ==
Aguilera performed "Blank Page" for the first time live at the 39th People's Choice Awards on January 9, 2013. She was surrounded by white candles, and she wore a white blaze with black leggings. According to reports published by Us Weekly, Aguilera was very emotional prior to her performance, and that the audience was in tears during her rehearsals of the song. Lauren Moraski of CBS News called it a "heart-wrenching performance." Amy Sciarretto for PopCrush wrote that it was a "simple and unfettered" performance that allowed her to "show off" her vocals. She continued to write that although she occasionally sounded strained, she sounded better than most singers on their good day. After her performance, she was presented with the People's Voice Award, where she also gave an acceptance speech.

On May 28, 2016, Aguilera's performance in front of a crowd of 250,000 people marked the closing of the Moroccan music festival Mawazine. Among the twenty songs performed by her was the ballad "Blank Page", preceded by a snippet of "I Am" from the album Bionic. In July 2017, the singer performed "Blank Page" at the BMO Harris Bradley Center in Milwaukee.

== Credits and personnel ==
Recording

- Vocals recorded at The Red Lips Room, Beverly Hills, CA; Human Feel, Los Angeles, CA.

Personnel

- Songwriting – Christina Aguilera, Chris Braide, Sia Furler
- Production – Chris Braide
- Vocal recording – Oscar Ramirez
- Programming, string arrangement, piano and keyboards – Chris Braide

Credits adapted from the liner notes of Lotus, RCA Records.

== Charts ==
Following the release of Lotus, "Blank Page" debuted on the South Korea International Singles Chart at number 53 during the week of November 11 to 17, 2012, with digital download sales of 4,299.

Chart (2012)	Peak position
South Korea (International Singles) (Gaon)	53
