= Just a Fool =

Single by Christina Aguilera and Blake Shelton

from the album Lotus
- Released: December 4, 2012
- Recorded: 2012
- Studio: Northern Sky Music (London, UK); The Red Lips Room (Beverly Hills, CA); Luminous Sound (Dallas, TX)
- Genre: Country pop
- Length: 4:13
- Label: RCA
- Songwriters: Steve Robson; Claude Kelly; Wayne Hector
- Producers: Robson; Aguilera (vocals); Kelly

Christina Aguilera singles chronology
"Your Body" (2012)	"Just a Fool" (2012)	"Feel This Moment" (2013)

Blake Shelton singles chronology
"Over" (2012)	"Just a Fool" (2012)	"Sure Be Cool If You Did" (2013)

Audio video
- "Just a Fool" on YouTube

"Just a Fool" is a duet recorded by American singer songwriters Christina Aguilera and Blake Shelton for Aguilera's seventh studio album, Lotus (2012). The track was written by Claude Kelly, Wayne Hector, and its producer Steve Robson. "Just a Fool" was sent to contemporary hit and hot adult contemporary radio stations in the United States by RCA Records as the second and final single from the album on December 4, 2012. The song is a country pop ballad which discusses the pain of a break-up.

Following its release, "Just a Fool" received mostly positive reviews from music critics, who complimented the track's sound. Commercially, the single peaked at number 71 on the US Billboard Hot 100 and number 37 on the Canadian Hot 100, also reaching number one in Ukraine, and number four in Iceland. As of 2015, the single has sold 802,000 digital copies in the United States according to Nielsen SoundScan. To promote Lotus and the song, Aguilera and Shelton performed "Just a Fool" on the third season of American television singing contest The Voice on November 19, 2012, and on The Ellen DeGeneres Show on December 7, 2012.

== Background and release ==
Following the release of her sixth studio album, Bionic (2010), which failed to generate impact on charts worldwide, Aguilera filed for divorce from her husband Jordan Bratman, starred in the film Burlesque and recorded the accompanying soundtrack. She then became a coach on NBC's singing competition show The Voice and appeared as a featured artist on Maroon 5's single "Moves Like Jagger" (2011), which spent four weeks atop the US Billboard Hot 100 chart. Following these events, Aguilera announced her plans to begin production of her seventh album, stating that she wanted high quality and "personal" songs for the record. Regarding the creative direction, she revealed that the album would be a "culmination of everything I've experienced up until this point ... I've been through a lot since the release of my last album, being on ('The Voice'), having had a divorce ... This is all sort of a free rebirth for me." She further said "I'm embracing many different things, but it's all feel-good, super-expressive [and] super-vulnerable." Aguilera continued to say that the album would be about "self–expression and freedom" because of the personal struggles she had overcome during the last couple of years.

Speaking about her new material during an interview on The Tonight Show with Jay Leno in 2012, Aguilera said that the recording process for Lotus was taking a while because "I don't like to just get songs from producers. I like them to come from a personal place ... I'm very excited. It's fun, exciting, introspective, it's going to be great". Recorded at Northern Sky Music by Sam Miller, "Just a Fool" was written by Steve Robson, Claude Kelly and Wayne Hector, with production handled by Steve Robson. Aguilera's vocals were recorded at The Red Lips Room in Beverly Hills, California, while Shelton's vocals were recorded at Luminous Sound in Dallas, Texas. The duo's vocals were recorded by Oscar Ramirez, and Aguilera produced them with Kelly. Robson also carried out programming and keyboards, arranging, and guitars. Following the release of Lotus, "Just a Fool" managed to debut on the Billboard Hot 100 chart, prompting RCA Records to release the song as a single. On December 4, 2012, the label sent the track to contemporary hit and hot adult contemporary radio stations in the United States as the second and final single from the album. On February 18, 2013, the single was released to adult contemporary radio in the US.

== Development ==
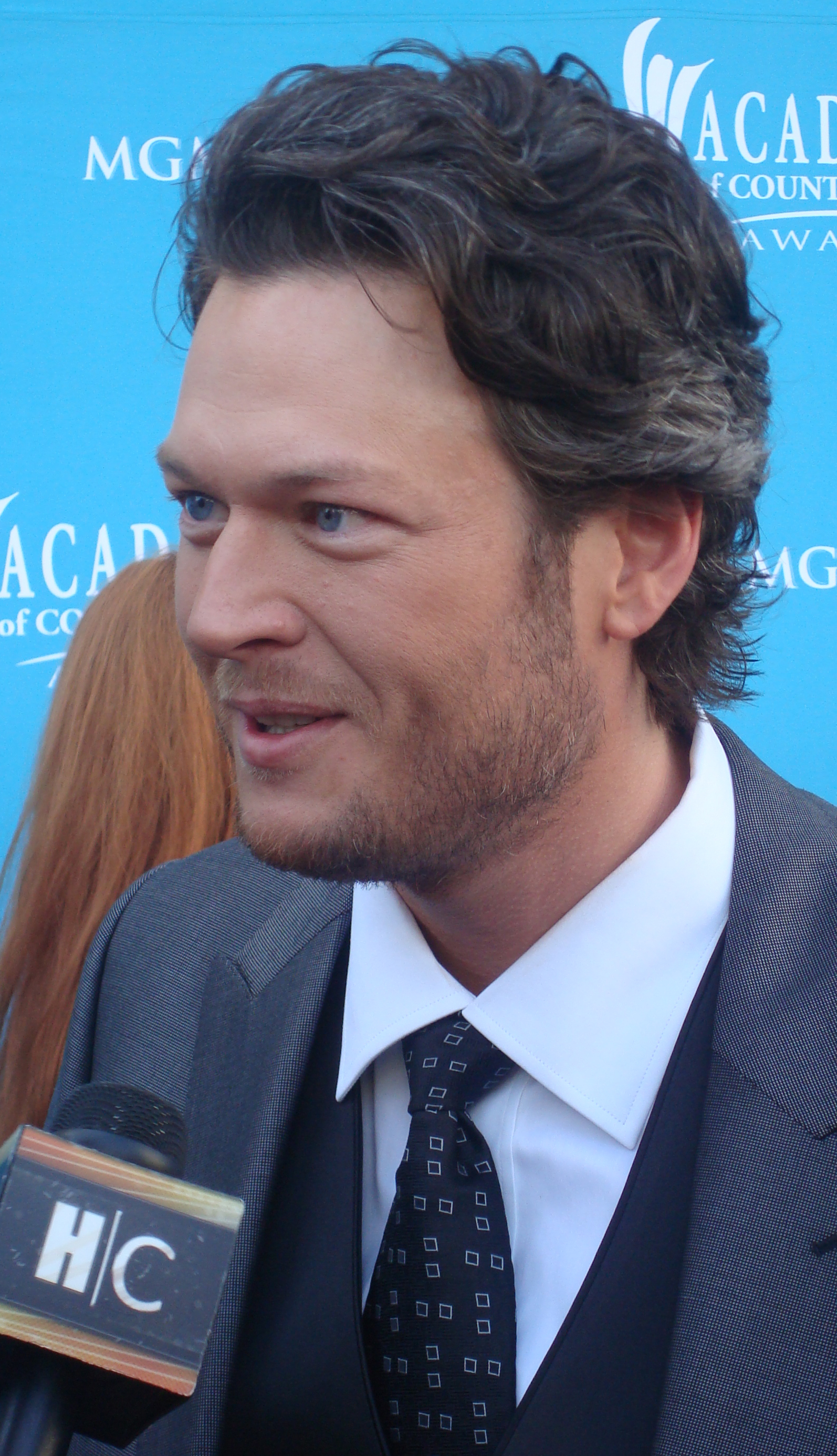
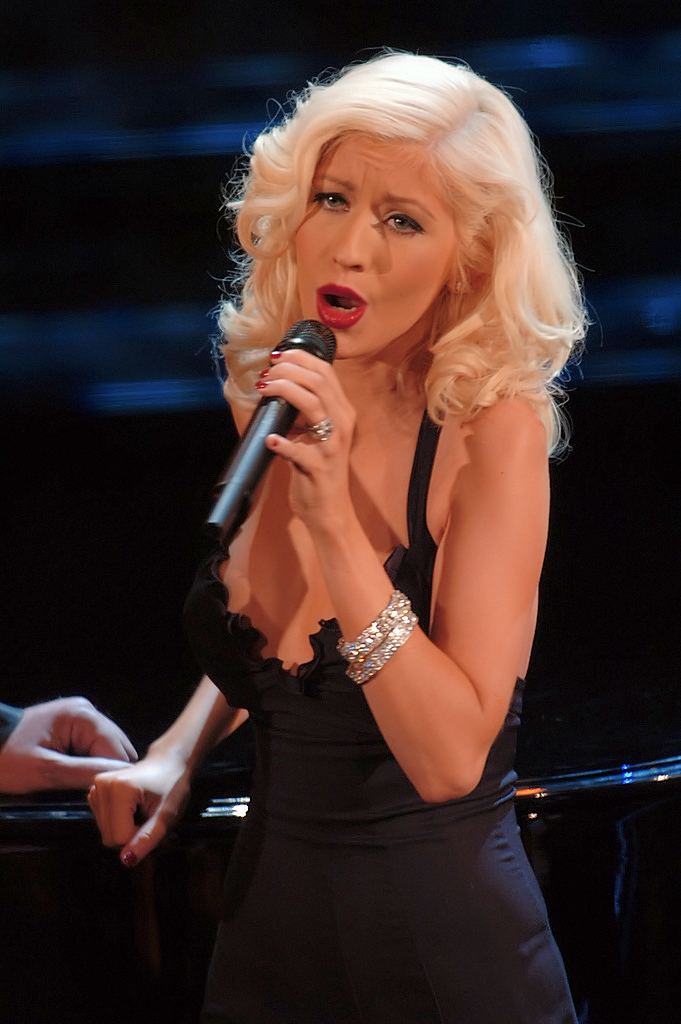
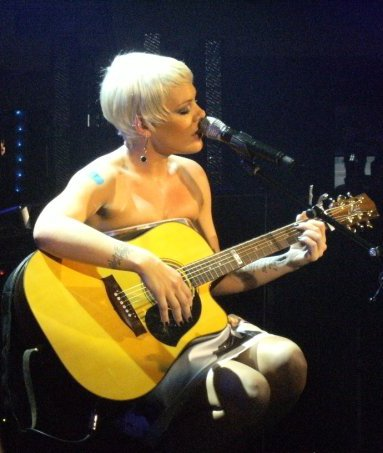
At first, "Just a Fool" was intended for Pink (right), but later the song was given to Aguilera (center) for her album Lotus (2012). Aguilera's colleague from The Voice, American recording artist Blake Shelton (left), is featured on the track.

Blake Shelton and Christina Aguilera both served as coaches on the NBC's American reality talent show The Voice and became good friends during production. During an interview, Aguilera said, "He's my big brother, I'm the closest to him of all the guys. Blake is just a rockstar; he's great. He's so playful, so fun and down to earth. He's got a lot of heart". The whole idea for the duet between Christina and Blake came into being when Christina started a performance with a snippet of his song "Hillbilly Bone". Blake tweeted he was speechless, and Christina tweeted back, "Now we need to team up for a country duet Blake!! I'm down!!". In an interview with Rolling Stone, Aguilera commented about teaming up with her colleagues,

"I'm one that likes to collaborate. I love feeding off the creative energy, and it only makes me better. I'm on a continual path both personally and professionally. All-around, it's my goal to better myself as a person and an artist, and the show is one of those contributing factors and the guys are great friends at this point. It's fun collaborating with them at this point".

Aguilera also revealed that Shelton "busted his [butt]" to "make the time" to record the song with her. On October 16, 2012, it was announced that the duet was called "Just a Fool" and the track would be included on Aguilera's album Lotus (2012). According to Steve Robson–the main writer of the song–at first, "Just a Fool" was initially pitched to Pink, but later Adam Lambert recorded a version of the track. Finally, Aguilera and Shelton recorded "Just a Fool" after the song was scrapped from Lambert's album Trespassing (2012) "at the last minute".

== Composition ==
"Just a Fool" (2012)
A 25 second sample of "Just a Fool", featuring Aguilera and Shelton singing the chorus over a country pop production.

"Just a Fool" was written by Steve Robson, Claude Kelly and Wayne Hector, with production done by Robson. The song is a country pop ballad with elements of pop rock. The track is also Aguilera's first country song. It lasts for a duration of 4:13 (four minutes and 13 seconds). "Just a Fool" was composed in the key of G major, with a moderate slow tempo of 56 beats per minute. Many instruments were featured on the track, including keyboards, guitars and strings. It starts with a simple guitar riff and a toe-tapping mid-tempo drum beat. Chris Youne of 4Music described the song as a "pop-meets-rock-meets-country" song. Lyrically, "Just a Fool" talks about the pain of a break-up. Aguilera takes the first verse singing about sitting alone in a bar late at night, "Another shot of whisky please bartender, keep it coming till I don't remember". At the second verse, Blake sings in his raspy country tones and the two unite for the chorus. Robert Cospey of Digital Spy described the chorus of the track as a "sing-songy" one.

== Critical reception ==
"Just a Fool" received mostly positive reviews from music critics. In a track-by-track review, Robert Copsey of Digital Spy wrote that the song "looks obligatory on paper but fortunately isn't so bad in reality [...] Truth be told, we suspect there's a good reason why this has been saved for the back-end of the album". Chris Younie of 4Music praised the song, writing that "It's mature, sophisticated and unlike anything else we've heard on the album. If you want variety, you got it". Andrew Hammp for Billboard was also positive toward the track, commenting that the song has an "epic" chorus that only increases in volume as the song progresses. In an extremely positive review, Glenn Gamboa of Newsday wrote that Aguilera and Shelton "empty their broken hearts in a magnificently sung breakup song". She also praised "Just a Fool" as Aguilera's career signature which should "stand next to 'Beautiful'". Jon Caramanica of The New York Times described the track as a "surprisingly warm duet" and Molly Lambert of Grantland named it "a monster-ballad". That Grape Juice praised "Just a Fool" as an "emotive anthem" and an "unexpected gem".

Sarah Godfrey of The Washington Post called it a "straightforward country-pop piece", while Stephen Thomas Erlewine of AllMusic named it "a slow, bluesy closer". Christina Garibaldi of MTV News praised Shelton's "smooth" and country vocals on the "hearbreaking" ballad, which fits nicely with Aguilera's "booming" ones. Melinda Newman of HitFix analyzed that Aguilera's voices on "Just a Fool" sounded like former longtime producer Linda Perry as she sings "yeah, yeah, yeah", but Shelton's sounds "rose to the occasion" and plays the "perfect partner". Michael Galluci of PopCrush praised Aguilera's "great" "throaty rasp" on the track. Jim Farber of New York Daily News provided a mixed review, writing that "[Shelton] sings with measured resolve while [Aguilera] nearly suffocates him. It's certainly a powerful approach, but it comes at the cost of communicating genuine soul". Negatively, Sal Cinquemani of Slant Magazine called it "an out-of-place country-pop duet with Blake Shelton, who feels like a cheap cash-in", while Annie Zaleskie for The A.V. Club criticized its "schmaltzy" sound.

== Chart performance ==
Music-related website That Grape Juice noted that at the time of its release, the song was "growing into a burgeoning hit". The single debuted at number 92 on the US Billboard Hot 100 chart during the week of November 18, 2012. During the following week, it climbed to number 71, which became its peak position on the chart. On the Adult Pop Songs chart, "Just a Fool" debuted at number 40 during the week of December 29, 2012 and peaked at number 28. On February 25, 2013, the single debuted at number 27 on the Adult Contemporary and peaked at number 23 shortly after. The song stayed a total of 12 weeks on the chart. As of April 2015, "Just a Fool" has sold over 802,000 copies in United States becoming Aguilera's tenth best selling digital single there, according to Nielsen SoundScan.

In Canada, the single peaked at number 37 on the country's singles chart and remained there for 20 weeks. On the 49th week of 2012, "Just a Fool" debuted and peaked at number 45 in Slovakia. It reached Top 5 in Iceland, where its peak was number four.

== Live performances and cover versions ==
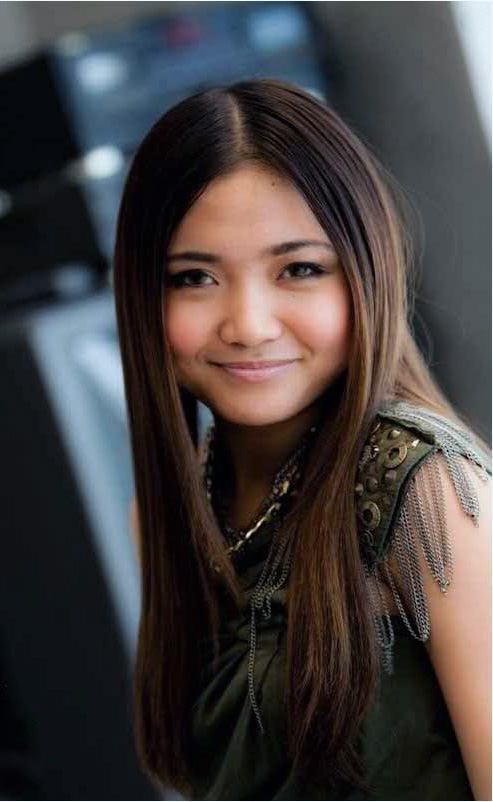
Filipino singer Charice Pempengco covered the song on the show Kris TV.

On November 19, 2012, Aguilera and Shelton performed "Just a Fool" for the first time on the third season of The Voice, an American television singing competition on which she is serviced as a coach. Wearing "sharp in dark", "semi-casual" outfits, the couple sang the first verse at opposite sides of the stage, and then came together onstage and shared the second one. During the performance, Aguilera kept belting to a minimum. The duo ended their singing with a hug. Caila Ball from Idolator wrote, "Clumsy cross-promotions and hyperbole aside, it was a night of stellar performances, kicked off by Coaches Christina and Blake making the world debut of 'Just a Fool'". She continued to praise the performance, commenting, "It was a refreshingly stripped down performance from Legendtina – who uncharacteristically took the stage in jeans. Blake, on the other hand, looked a little awkward up there without a guitar and a stool". On December 7, 2012, Aguilera and Shelton performed "Just a Fool" again on The Ellen DeGeneres Show. Sam Lansky from Idolator praised the performance, writing that the performance featured "typically dramatic" vocals and a lot of "spectacular runs", which helped the duo sound great.

During the semi-finals of the twelfth season of American television singing contest American Idol, contestant Paul Jolley chose "Just a Fool" as the song to sing on the show. On May 7, 2013, Filipino singer Charice Pempengco also made a cover of the song on the show Kris TV with her girlfriend Alyssa Quijano. Kelly Clarkson covered the song in her own talk show on February 12, 2021. Blake Shelton performed the song with Wendy Moten during the finale of the 21st season of The Voice.

== Credits and personnel ==
Recording

- Recorded at Northern Sky Music.
- Vocals recorded at The Red Lips Room, Beverly Hills, California (Aguilera's vocals); Luminous Sound, Dallas, Texas (Shelton's vocals).

Personnel

- Songwriting – Steve Robson, Claude Kelly, Wayne Hector
- Producing – Steve Robson
- Programming & keyboards – Steve Robson
- Arranging – Steve Robson, Pete Whitfield
- Guitars – Luke Potashnick, Steve Robson
- Violins – Pete Whitfield, Sarah Brandwood-Spencer, Alex Stemp, Julian Cole
- Celli – Simon Turner, Ruth Owens
- Recording – Sam Miller
- Vocal recording – Oscar Ramirez
- Vocal producing – Christina Aguilera, Claude Kelly

Credits adapted from the liner notes of Lotus, RCA Records.

== Charts ==
Chart (2012–13)	Peak position
Canada (Canadian Hot 100)	37
Canada AC (Billboard)	26
Canadian Digital Song Sales (Billboard)	21
Iceland (Tónlist)	4
Slovakia (Rádio Top 100)	45
South Korea (Gaon)	162
Ukraine (TopHit)	1
US Billboard Hot 100	71
US Adult Contemporary (Billboard)	21
US Adult Top 40 (Billboard)	28

== Release history ==
Country	Released	Format	Label
United States	December 4, 2012	Contemporary hit radio	RCA Records
United States	December 4, 2012	Hot adult contemporary radio	RCA Records
United States	February 18, 2013	Adult contemporary radio	RCA Records
