= Lotus (Christina Aguilera album) =

Studio album by Christina Aguilera
- Released: November 9, 2012
- Recorded: 2011–2012
- Studios: Westlake (Los Angeles, California); The Red Lips Room (Beverly Hills, California); Henson (Los Angeles); Radley (Los Angeles); Mux Music (London, UK); MXM (Stockholm, Sweden); Chalice (Los Angeles); Human Feel (Los Angeles); Northern Sky Music (London, UK); Luminous Sound (Dallas, Texas)
- Genre: Pop
- Length: 47:30
- Label: RCA
- Producers: Christina Aguilera; Alex da Kid; Chris Braide; Busbee; Mike Del Rio; Jayson DeZuzio; Dem Jointz; Jason Gilbert; Jamie Hartman; Claude Kelly; Aeon "Step" Manahan; Max Martin; Candice Pillay; Steve Robson; Lucas Secon; Shellback; Supa Dups; Tracklacers

Christina Aguilera chronology
Burlesque (2010)	Lotus (2012)	Liberation (2018)

Singles from Lotus
- 1. "Your Body" Released: September 16, 2012; 2. "Just a Fool" Released: December 4, 2012

Lotus is the seventh studio album by American singer-songwriter Christina Aguilera. RCA Records released it on November 9, 2012. The album is Aguilera's first effort following her divorce from Jordan Bratman. Lotus is a pop album with elements of dance-pop and rock in the form of upbeat songs and piano-driven ballads. Aguilera described the album as a "rebirth", drawing inspiration from events in her life, her appearance on The Voice, and her divorce. The album was recorded at Aguilera's home studio. As executive producer, she collaborated with a wide range of producers, including new partners Alex da Kid, Max Martin, Lucas Secon and Tracklacers.

Two singles were released from Lotus. The first single "Your Body" charted within the top 40 of most countries. The second one, "Just a Fool", was a duet with fellow The Voice coach Blake Shelton and peaked at number 71 on the US Billboard Hot 100. "Let There Be Love" was released as a promotional single along with a music video and a letter to her fans in August 2013. It topped the US Dance Club Songs chart.

Upon its release, Lotus received generally mixed reviews from music critics, who were ambivalent towards its lyrics and found its music conventional. It debuted at number seven on the US Billboard 200, with first-week sales of 73,408 units. Internationally, the album charted moderately, but obtained higher positions in Canada, Russia, Switzerland, and Venezuela, where it reached the top 10.

== Background ==
After the release of Aguilera's sixth studio album, Bionic (2010), which failed to generate her usual sales, she divorced from her husband Jordan Bratman, starred in a film called Burlesque, and recorded its accompanying soundtrack. The singer then became a coach on NBC's singing contest show The Voice and appeared as a guest vocalist on Maroon 5's single "Moves like Jagger" (2011), which spent four weeks atop the US Billboard Hot 100 chart. Following these events, Aguilera announced that she wanted to record her seventh album, stating that she wanted high-quality and personal songs to record. She stated that the album would be a "culmination of everything I've experienced up until this point ... I've been through a lot since the release of my last album, being on (The Voice), having had a divorce ... This is all sort of a free rebirth for me." She went on to say that "I'm embracing many different things, but it's all feel-good, super-expressive [and] super-vulnerable." She further expressed that the album would be about "self-expression and freedom" because of the personal struggles she had overcome during the last couple of years.

On The Tonight Show with Jay Leno in 2012, Aguilera revealed that the album was taking a while to record because "I don't like to just get songs from producers. I like them to come from a personal place ... I'm very excited. It's fun, exciting, introspective, it's going to be great". In an interview with Rolling Stone, Aguilera said that the album was a "very multi-layered, very heartfelt record" reflecting different sides of her personality. On Lotus, Aguilera worked with new producers, notably Alex da Kid and Max Martin. Alex da Kid, who first teamed with Aguilera in the song "Castle Walls" from T.I.'s No Mercy (2010), commented about Aguilera's approach in recording Lotus, "She definitely had a strong opinion, but she'll go with the best idea in the room. That's really rare for someone that's had so much success." Speaking about working with Max Martin, Aguilera said, "Max is legendary in the business. He's known about me but we haven't crossed paths. [...] It's taken us a decade in the same business and watching each other from a distance, so for us to now come together and respect each other's work ethic and how we like to be heard and making a marriage out of it, I think 'Your Body' is the best culmination of that."

Aguilera announced via Twitter on September 12, 2012, that the album would be titled Lotus. The album artwork was shot by fashion photographer Enrique Badulescu and was unveiled by Aguilera on October 5. The cover shows Aguilera emerging from a lotus flower with her arms outstretched. She is completely nude with her long, blonde hair covering her breasts, while her vulva is obscured by a white light. It received a generally positive response from critics, with Tiffany Lee from Yahoo! Music complimenting Aguilera's figure. Lotus was released on November 13, 2012, by RCA Records.

== Composition ==
"Army of Me"
"Army of Me" is a dance-pop and eurodance song about empowerment, which Aguilera described as "Fighter 2.0".

Lotus is primarily a pop album that features soul ballads and disco. It incorporates elements of dance-pop and rock in the form of uptempo songs and piano-driven ballads. The album opens with the track "Lotus Intro", which was inspired by Aguilera's passion for "chill-out" electronica. The song has a "hypnotic" yet "dark, serious" tone that develops and matures as it progresses, depicting Aguilera's rebirth, similar to the life cycle of a lotus flower. Originally, the song was meant to include a sample from M83's single "Midnight City" but the interpolation is not heard in the final track. "Army of Me" is a dance-pop and eurodance song about empowerment, with a pounding drum beat and rock guitars. Aguilera described the song as an updated version of her single "Fighter" (2003), describing it as a "Fighter 2.0". The up-tempo track "Red Hot Kinda Love" combines a variety of genres, including dance and disco, "subtle" tones of Latin, hip hop, and pop. It contains two samples: "The Whole Wide World Ain't Nothin' But a Party" performed by Mark Radice and "54-46 That's My Number" performed by Toots & the Maytals. On the song, Aguilera keeps her use of melisma to a minimum. Lyrically, the song talks about Aguilera's attempts to impress the man she is flirting with.

"Make the World Move", featuring CeeLo Green, is a track which incorporates dance, R&B and soul genres. The next track and first single from Lotus is "Your Body". It incorporates electropop and R&B genres and has a trace of dubstep in the middle eight. Lyrically, it discusses anonymous sex with a random man. "Let There Be Love" features dance-pop, electronic dance music and pop genres with elements from electronica and trance. The power ballad "Sing for Me" tells how Aguilera was born to sing, inspired by Aguilera's love for her idols: Mariah Carey, Whitney Houston and Etta James. Its instrumentation consists of soft strings, a delicate piano melody and "80s power ballad-type drums" at its close. The key in which the structure was composed is changed during the course of the song. The song features a "thunderous" ironic chorus which consists of the lyrics "'Cause when I open my mouth, my whole heart comes out." "Blank Page" is a piano-driven ballad about apologies, regrets, closure, and making peace.

"Cease Fire" is a rock-tinged track that features electronic and dubstep infusion. Lyrically, it is a plea to her partner to stop the fighting for the greater good of their relationship. "Around the World" has a ragga influence and refers to Aguilera's 2001 hit "Lady Marmalade" as she whispers "Voulez-vous coucher avec moi, ce soir?". The pop track "Circles" is an anti-haters song and is influenced by the alternative rock genre. "Best of Me" is a power ballad about a failed relationship and how to not let others knock you down. "Just a Fool", the last track of Lotus and its second single, is a duet with Blake Shelton. The song is a country pop ballad about the pain of a break-up.

== Promotion ==
=== Singles ===
To promote Lotus, two singles were released from the album. "Your Body" was released on September 17, 2012, as Lotus's lead single. The song received mostly positive reviews from music critics, who praised Aguilera's vocals and the collaboration with Max Martin. It debuted and peaked at number 34 on the Billboard Hot 100 on September 27, 2012, becoming the highest-debut single during that week. Internationally, "Your Body" was a moderate success, peaking within the top 40 of most countries. The song's accompanying music video was directed by Melina Matsoukas; it portrays Aguilera as a killer dressed in pink, one who delights in wooing physically fit men to their demise. The second and final single from Lotus, the duet "Just a Fool" with Blake Shelton, was released on December 4, 2012. It debuted at number 92 on the Billboard Hot 100 on November 17, 2012 and peaked at number 71 in its second week charting. As of September 2014, the single has sold over 746,000 copies in United States.

=== Live performances ===
Besides releasing singles to promote the album, Aguilera also performed several tracks from Lotus on a number of shows. On November 2, 2012, she performed "Your Body" on Late Night with Jimmy Fallon, alongside Jimmy Fallon and The Roots. Aguilera and Cee Lo Green performed "Make the World Move" together on the third season of The Voice on November 13, 2012. The singer performed a medley of three songs, "Lotus Intro", "Army of Me" and "Let There Be Love" at the 40th American Music Awards on November 18, 2012, held at the Nokia Theatre in Los Angeles, California. On November 19, 2012, Aguilera performed "Just a Fool" with Blake Shelton on The Voice.

== Critical reception ==
Lotus ratings
Aggregate scores
Source	Rating
Metacritic	56/100
Review scores
Source	Rating
AllMusic	4/5 stars
The A.V. Club	C
Entertainment Weekly	C−
Exclaim!	7/10
The Independent	3/5 stars
The Observer	3/5 stars
Q	2/5 stars
Rolling Stone	2.5/5 stars
The Scotsman	3/5 stars
Slant Magazine	3/5 stars

Lotus received generally mixed reviews from music critics. At Metacritic, which assigns a normalized rating out of 100 to reviews from mainstream critics, the album received an average score of 56, based on 12 reviews. Sarah Rodman of The Boston Globe called it "a good start in the effort to refocus attention on Aguilera's skills", but observed "several tracks that sound mindlessly repetitive as sedentary listening experiences". Q called it "generic" and felt that "nothing really stands out". Annie Zaleski of The A.V. Club felt that the album "often plays it safe" and accused Aguilera of "dumbing down her voice or lyrics for the sake of lightweight tunes or prevailing trends." Melissa Maerz of Entertainment Weekly found the album's "self-empowerment anthems ... as contradictory as they are unoriginal" and criticized its production for "digitally smother[ing]" Aguilera's vocals and "draining all the emotion". Slant Magazine's Sal Cinquemani asserted that because it is "Aguilera's shortest album since her debut, it boasts less filler, but also fewer obvious standouts." Jon Caramanica of The New York Times felt that the album's conventional direction is "its biggest crime, more than its musical unadventurousness or its emphasis on bland self-help lyrics or its reluctance to lean on [...] Aguilera's voice, the thing that makes her special". Jon Dolan of Rolling Stone dismissed it as a "vitriol-tsunami of a record".

In a positive review, AllMusic editor Stephen Thomas Erlewine wrote that Aguilera "feels comfortable in this familiar, slightly freshened territory". Simon Price of The Independent felt that the album's "best moments are its electro-pop numbers". Kitty Empire of The Observer characterized its subject matter as "wiffle of the highest order", but wrote that "one of the pleasures of Aguilera is that she can use polysyllables, even when talking the rot that fills women's mags". Although she criticized the album's "upbeat pop anthems", Melody Lau of Exclaim! found Aguilera to be "reinvigorated" and felt that she "shines most when she's direct, honest and vulnerable". Celina Murphy of Hot Press felt that Lotus's "safer" direction and Aguilera's "default mode" makes the album an improvement from Bionic. At the end of 2012, Lotus was ranked at number 17 on the list "20 Best Pop Albums of 2012" by Spin. In contrast, Entertainment Weekly named it the worst album of 2012. Fuse voted Lotus as one of the best albums of 2012.

At the 2014 World Music Awards, Lotus was nominated for the Best Album award. It was also nominated for Album of the Year at the 2013 Spetteguless Awards.

== Commercial performance ==
In the United States, Lotus debuted at number seven on the Billboard 200 with first-week sales of 73,408 units. It became Aguilera's lowest first week sales in her career, surpassing Bionic (2010), which opened at number three with sales of 110,000 units, thereby becoming Aguilera's English-language studio album with the lowest first week sales. In its second week, the album fell 26% to 17th place, with sales of approximately 54,000 copies. A higher figure compared to the second week of her previous album "Bionic" from 2010. In Canada, Lotus peaked at number 7 on the Canadian Albums Chart and was certified gold by Music Canada for shipments of 40,000 copies there on January 10. The album debuted and peaked at 28 on the UK Albums Chart with sales of 9,422, becoming her lowest-charting album there. Internationally, Lotus underperformed, only reaching the top 20 and top 30 in most countries. However, it debuted higher in Russia, Switzerland, and Venezuela, where it reached top ten of the albums chart. As of August 2019, the album had sold over 303,000 copies in the United States, as reported by Nielsen SoundScan, and has been certified gold for 500,000 album-equivalent units.

== Track listing ==
Standard edition
No.	Title	Writer(s)	Producer(s)	Length
1.	"Lotus Intro"	Christina Aguilera; Dwayne Abernathy; Candice Pillay; Alexander Grant	Alex da Kid; Dem Jointz; Aguilera^{[a]}; Pillay^{[a]}	3:18
2.	"Army of Me"	Aguilera; Jamie Hartman; David Glass; Phil Bentley	Tracklacers; Hartman^{[b]}; Aguilera^{[a]}	3:27
3.	"Red Hot Kinda Love"	Aguilera; Lucas Secon; Olivia Waithe	Secon	3:06
4.	"Make the World Move" (featuring Cee Lo Green)	Grant; Mike Del Rio; Pillay; Jayson DeZuzio; Abernathy; Armando Trovajoli	Alex da Kid; Aguilera^{[a]}; Pillay^{[a]}	3:00
5.	"Your Body"	Max Martin; Shellback; Savan Kotecha; Tiffany Amber	Martin; Shellback	4:00
6.	"Let There Be Love"	Martin; Shellback; Kotecha; Bonnie McKee; Oliver Goldstein; Oscar Holter; Jakke Erixson	Martin; Shellback	3:21
7.	"Sing for Me"	Aguilera; Aeon Manahan; Ginny Blackmore	Aeon Step Manahan	4:01
8.	"Blank Page"	Aguilera; Chris Braide; Sia Furler	Braide	4:05
9.	"Cease Fire"	Aguilera; Grant; Pillay	Alex da Kid; Aguilera^{[a]}; Pillay^{[a]}	4:08
10.	"Around the World"	Aguilera; Dwayne "Supa Dups" Chin-Quee; Jason "JG" Gilbert; Ali Tamposi	Chin-Quee; Gilbert^{[b]}	3:25
11.	"Circles"	Aguilera; Grant; Pillay; Abernathy	Alex da Kid; Aguilera^{[a]}; Pillay^{[a]}	3:26
12.	"Best of Me"	Aguilera; Grant; Pillay; DeZuzio	Alex da Kid; DeZuzio; Aguilera^{[a]}; Pillay^{[a]}	4:08
13.	"Just a Fool" (with Blake Shelton)	Steve Robson; Claude Kelly; Wayne Hector	Robson; Aguilera^{[a]}; Kelly^{[a]}	4:14
Total length:				47:30

Deluxe edition
No.	Title	Writer(s)	Producer(s)	Length
14.	"Light Up the Sky"	Aguilera; Grant; Pillay	Alex da Kid; Aguilera^{[a]}; Pillay^{[a]}	3:31
15.	"Empty Words"	Aguilera; busbee; Nikki Flores; Tamposi	Busbee	3:47
16.	"Shut Up"	Aguilera; Grant; Pillay; Del Rio; Abernathy; Nate Campany	Alex da Kid; Aguilera^{[a]}; Pillay^{[a]}	2:53
17.	"Your Body" (Martin Garrix Remix)	Martin; Shellback; Kotecha; Amber	Martin; Shellback	5:12
Total length:				62:51

=== Notes ===
- ^{^[a]} signifies a vocal producer
- ^{^[b]} signifies a co-producer

=== Sampling credits ===
- "Red Hot Kinda Love" contains samples from "The Whole World Ain't Nothing But a Party", as performed by Mark Radice and "54–46 Was My Number", as performed by Toots and the Maytals.
- "Make the World Move" contains a portion of the composition "Let's Find Out", written by Armando Trovajoli.

== Personnel ==
Credits adapted from the liner notes of Lotus.

- Christina Aguilera – vocals, backing vocals, executive production
- Candice Pillay – backing vocals
- Max Martin – backing vocals, keyboards, production
- Aimée Proal – backing vocals
- Shellback – backing vocals, keyboards, production, programming, engineering
- Alex da Kid – production
- Chris Braide – production
- Busbee – production
- Mike Del Rio – production
- Jayson DeZuzio – production
- Dem Jointz – production
- Jason Gilbert – production
- Jamie Hartman – production, string arrangements
- Aeon "Step" Manahan – production, programming
- Steve Robson – keyboards, production, string arrangements, programming
- Lucas Secon – production
- Supa Dups – production
- Tracklacers – production
- Claude Kelly – vocal production
- Candice Pillay – vocal production
- Chris Braide – keyboards, string arrangements, programming
- Steve Daly – keyboards, bass, synthesizers
- Jon Keep – keyboards, synthesizers
- Alisha Bauer – strings
- Marisa Kuney – strings
- Songa Lee – strings
- Rodney Wirtz – strings
- Pete Whitfield – string arrangements
- Steve Daly – bass
- John Garrison – bass
- Lucas Secon – programming
- John Hanes – engineering
- Pete Hofmann – engineering
- Sam Holland – engineering, vocal engineering
- Josh Mosser – engineering
- Sam Miller – engineering
- Oscar Ramirez – engineering, vocal engineering
- Lucas Secon – engineering
- Justin Stanley – engineering
- Scott Hendricks – vocal engineering
- Graham Marsh – vocal engineering
- Phil Seaford – engineering assistance
- Christina Aguilera – A&R
- Keith Naftaly – A&R
- Enrique Badulescu – photography

== Charts ==
=== Weekly charts ===
Chart (2012–13)	Peak position
Australian Albums (ARIA)	19
Austrian Albums (Ö3 Austria)	13
Belgian Albums (Ultratop Flanders)	26
Belgian Albums (Ultratop Wallonia)	42
Canadian Albums (Billboard)	7
Czech Albums (ČNS IFPI)	16
Danish Albums (Hitlisten)	23
Dutch Albums (MegaCharts)	12
Ecuadorian Albums (Musicalisimo)	6
French Albums (SNEP)	50
German Albums (Offizielle Top 100)	13
Greek Albums (IFPI)	14
Hungarian Albums (MAHASZ)	17
Irish Albums (IRMA)	29
Italian Albums (FIMI)	12
Japanese Albums (Oricon)	29
Mexican Albums (Top 100 Mexico)	19
New Zealand Albums (RMNZ)	29
Norwegian Albums (VG-lista)	25
Portuguese Albums (AFP)	23
Russian Albums (2M)	6
Scottish Albums (OCC)	33
South Korean Albums (Gaon)	20
South Korean International Albums (Gaon)	4
Spanish Albums (PROMUSICAE)	13
Swedish Albums (Sverigetopplistan)	39
Swiss Albums (Schweizer Hitparade)	10
Venezuelan Albums (Recordland)	2
UK Albums (OCC)	28
US Billboard 200	7

=== Year-end charts ===
Chart (2013)	Position
Russian Albums (2M)	41
US Billboard 200	117

== Certifications ==
Region	Certification	Certified units/sales
Brazil (Pro-Música Brasil)	Gold	20,000^{‡}
Canada (Music Canada)	Gold	40,000^{^}
United States (RIAA)	Gold	500,000^{‡}
^{^} Shipments figures based on certification alone.^{‡} Sales+streaming figures based on certification alone.

== Release history ==
List of release dates, showing region, edition(s), format(s), label(s) and reference(s)
Region	Date	Edition(s)	Format(s)	Label(s)	Ref.
Austria	November 9, 2012	Standard; deluxe	CD; digital download	Sony Music	
Germany	November 9, 2012	Standard; deluxe	CD; digital download	Sony Music	
Switzerland	November 9, 2012	Standard; deluxe	CD; digital download	Sony Music	
Taiwan	November 9, 2012	Deluxe	CD; digital download	Sony Music	
France	November 12, 2012	Standard; deluxe	CD; digital download	Sony Music	
United Kingdom	November 12, 2012	Standard; deluxe	CD; digital download	RCA	
Brazil	November 13, 2012	Standard; deluxe	CD; digital download	Sony Music	
Canada	November 13, 2012	Standard; deluxe	CD; digital download	Sony Music	
United States	November 13, 2012	Standard; deluxe	CD; digital download	RCA	
Denmark	November 14, 2012	Standard; deluxe	CD; digital download	Sony Music	
Finland	November 14, 2012	Standard; deluxe	CD; digital download	Sony Music	
Japan	November 14, 2012	Deluxe	CD; digital download	Sony Music	
Norway	November 14, 2012	Standard; deluxe	CD; digital download	Sony Music	
Sweden	November 14, 2012	Standard; deluxe	CD; digital download	Sony Music	
Mexico	November 15, 2012	Deluxe	CD; digital download	Sony Music	
Australia	November 16, 2012	Deluxe	CD; digital download	Sony Music	
United States	February 19, 2021	Deluxe	Urban Outfitters-exclusive Vinyl	RCA	
