= 39th People's Choice Awards =

Pop culture award show held in 2013

- Date: January 9, 2013
- Location: Nokia Theatre, Los Angeles, California
- Hosted by: Kaley Cuoco
- Website: https://peopleschoice.com/

Television/radio coverage
- Network: CBS, Xbox Live

The 39th People's Choice Awards ceremony, honoring the best in popular culture for 2012, was held January 9, 2013 at the Nokia Theatre in Los Angeles, and was broadcast live on CBS and simulcast over Xbox Live at 9:00 pm EST. The ceremony was hosted by Kaley Cuoco. The nominees were announced in November 2012.

Katy Perry dominated the 39th People's Choice Awards by winning the most awards for one person, winning four nominations, including Favorite Female Artist. The Hunger Games was the top victor with five trophies while Twilight won Best Movie Fan Following.

== Performances ==
- Alicia Keys – "New Day" / "Girl on Fire"
- Jason Aldean – "My Kinda Party"
- Christina Aguilera – "Blank Page"

== Presenters ==
- Jensen Ackles
- Stephen Amell
- Anthony Anderson
- Matt Bomer
- Chris Colfer
- Rachael Leigh Cook
- LL Cool J
- Ellen DeGeneres
- Robert Downey Jr.
- Mindy Kaling
- Johnny Galecki
- Linda Hunt
- Jennifer Lawrence
- NeNe Leakes
- Chloë Grace Moretz
- Olivia Munn
- Chris O'Donnell
- Jason O'Mara
- Jared Padalecki
- Monica Potter
- Eddie Redmayne
- Alison Sweeney
- Taylor Swift
- Ian Somerhalder
- Casey Wilson

== Nominees ==
Winners are listed in bold.

=== Movies ===
Favorite Movie	Favorite Action Movie
The Amazing Spider-Man; The Avengers; The Dark Knight Rises; **The Hunger Games**; Snow White and the Huntsman	The Amazing Spider-Man; The Avengers; The Dark Knight Rises; **The Hunger Games**; Men in Black 3
Favorite Comedy Movie	Favorite Drama Movie
21 Jump Street; Dark Shadows; Pitch Perfect; **Ted**; What to Expect When You're Expecting	Argo; The Lucky One; Magic Mike; **The Perks of Being a Wallflower**; The Vow
Favorite Movie Franchise	Favorite Movie Fan Following
The Avengers; The Dark Knight; **The Hunger Games**; Madagascar; Spider-Man	Potterheads – Harry Potter; Ringers – The Lord of the Rings; Rum Runners – Pirates of the Caribbean; Tributes – The Hunger Games; **Twihards – Twilight**
Favorite Movie Actor	Favorite Movie Actress
Johnny Depp; **Robert Downey Jr.**; Joseph Gordon-Levitt; Will Smith; Channing Tatum	Anne Hathaway; Scarlett Johansson; Mila Kunis; **Jennifer Lawrence**; Emma Stone
Favorite Dramatic Movie Actor	Favorite Dramatic Movie Actress
Bradley Cooper; **Zac Efron**; Jake Gyllenhaal; Liam Neeson; Channing Tatum	Keira Knightley; Rachel McAdams; Meryl Streep; Charlize Theron; **Emma Watson**
Favorite Action Movie Star	Favorite Movie Superhero
Christian Bale; Robert Downey Jr.; Chris Evans; **Chris Hemsworth**; Will Smith	Christian Bale – The Dark Knight Rises as Bruce Wayne / Batman; **Robert Downey Jr. – The Avengers as Tony Stark / Iron Man**; Chris Evans – The Avengers as Steve Rogers / Captain America; Andrew Garfield – The Amazing Spider-Man as Peter Parker / Spider-Man; Chris Hemsworth – The Avengers as Thor
Favorite Comedic Movie Actor	Favorite Comedic Movie Actress
Will Ferrell; Zach Galifianakis; **Adam Sandler**; Ben Stiller; Channing Tatum	**Jennifer Aniston**; Emily Blunt; Cameron Diaz; Mila Kunis; Reese Witherspoon
Favorite On-Screen Chemistry	Favorite Movie Icon
Scarlett Johansson and Jeremy Renner – The Avengers; **Jennifer Lawrence, Josh Hutcherson and Liam Hemsworth – The Hunger Games**; Rachel McAdams and Channing Tatum – The Vow; Kristen Stewart and Chris Hemsworth – Snow White and the Huntsman; Emma Stone and Andrew Garfield – The Amazing Spider-Man	Michelle Pfeiffer; Susan Sarandon; Maggie Smith; **Meryl Streep**; Emma Thompson
Favorite Face of Heroism	Favorite Animated Movie
Anne Hathaway – The Dark Knight Rises; Scarlett Johansson – The Avengers; **Jennifer Lawrence – The Hunger Games**; Kristen Stewart – Snow White and the Huntsman; Emma Stone – The Amazing Spider-Man	Brave; Ice Age: Continental Drift; Madagascar 3: Europe's Most Wanted; Rise of the Guardians; **Wreck-It Ralph**

=== Television ===
Favorite Network TV Comedy	Favorite Network TV Drama
**The Big Bang Theory**; Glee; How I Met Your Mother; Modern Family; New Girl	Gossip Girl; **Grey's Anatomy**; Grimm; Once Upon a Time; Revenge
Favorite TV Comedy Actor	Favorite TV Comedy Actress
Ty Burrell; **Chris Colfer**; Jesse Tyler Ferguson; Neil Patrick Harris; Jim Parsons	Kaley Cuoco; Zooey Deschanel; Jane Lynch; **Lea Michele**; Sofía Vergara
Favorite TV Drama Actor	Favorite TV Drama Actress
Jensen Ackles; **Nathan Fillion**; Jared Padalecki; Ian Somerhalder; Paul Wesley	Emily Deschanel; Nina Dobrev; Ginnifer Goodwin; Stana Katic; **Ellen Pompeo**
Favorite Cable TV Comedy	Favorite Cable TV Drama
**Awkward**; Hot in Cleveland; It's Always Sunny in Philadelphia; Melissa & Joey; Psych	Burn Notice; **Leverage**; Pretty Little Liars; The Walking Dead; White Collar
Favorite TV Crime Drama	Favorite Sci-Fi/Fantasy Show
Bones; **Castle**; Criminal Minds; CSI: Crime Scene Investigation; NCIS	Doctor Who; Once Upon a Time; **Supernatural**; The Vampire Diaries; The Walking Dead
Favorite New TV Comedy	Favorite New TV Drama
Go On; Guys with Kids; The Mindy Project; The Neighbors; **The New Normal**	Arrow; **Beauty & the Beast**; Elementary; Nashville; Revolution
Favorite Daytime TV Host	Favorite Late Night TV Host
**Ellen DeGeneres – The Ellen DeGeneres Show**; Kelly Ripa and Michael Strahan – Live with Kelly and Michael; Al Roker, Savannah Guthrie, Matt Lauer and Natalie Morales – Today; George Stephanopoulos, Josh Elliott, Lara Spencer, Robin Roberts and Sam Champion – Good Morning America; Barbara Walters, Elisabeth Hasselbeck, Joy Behar, Sherri Shepherd and Whoopi Goldberg – The View	**Jimmy Fallon**; Chelsea Handler; Jimmy Kimmel; David Letterman; Conan O'Brien
Favorite TV Competition Show	Favorite Celebrity Judge
America's Got Talent; American Idol; Dancing with the Stars; The Voice; **The X Factor**	Christina Aguilera; Adam Levine; Jennifer Lopez; **Demi Lovato**; Britney Spears
Favorite Thriller Show	Favorite New Talk Show Host
Dexter; Game of Thrones; Homeland; Spartacus; **True Blood**	Katie Couric; **Steve Harvey**; Ricki Lake; Jeff Probst; Michael Strahan
Favorite TV Fan Following	Favorite Cartoon Show
Gleeks – Glee; Little Liars – Pretty Little Liars; Oncers – Once Upon a Time; **SPNFamily – Supernatural**; TVDFamily – The Vampire Diaries	The Cleveland Show; Family Guy; Futurama; The Simpsons; **South Park**

=== Music ===
Favorite Song of the Year	Favorite Album of the Year
"Call Me Maybe" – Carly Rae Jepsen; "One More Night" – Maroon 5; "We Are Never Ever Getting Back Together" – Taylor Swift; "We Are Young" – fun. feat. Janelle Monáe; **"What Makes You Beautiful" – One Direction**	Believe – Justin Bieber; Blown Away – Carrie Underwood; Overexposed – Maroon 5; Some Nights – fun.; **Up All Night – One Direction**
Favorite Music Video	Favorite Music Fan Following
"Boyfriend" – Justin Bieber; "Call Me Maybe" – Carly Rae Jepsen; "Gangnam Style" – Psy; **"Part of Me" – Katy Perry**; "Payphone" – Maroon 5 feat. Wiz Khalifa	Beliebers – Justin Bieber; Directioners – One Direction; **Katycats – Katy Perry**; Lovatics – Demi Lovato; Selenators – Selena Gomez
Favorite Male Artist	Favorite Female Artist
Justin Bieber; Chris Brown; **Jason Mraz**; Blake Shelton; Usher	Adele; **Katy Perry**; Pink; Taylor Swift; Carrie Underwood
Favorite Band	Favorite Pop Artist
Green Day; **Maroon 5**; Linkin Park; No Doubt; Train	Adele; Justin Bieber; Demi Lovato; **Katy Perry**; Pink
Favorite Hip Hop Artist	Favorite R&B Artist
Drake; Flo Rida; Jay-Z; **Nicki Minaj**; Pitbull	Beyoncé; Alicia Keys; Bruno Mars; **Rihanna**; Usher
Favorite Country Artist	Favorite Breakout Artist
Jason Aldean; Tim McGraw; Blake Shelton; **Taylor Swift**; Carrie Underwood	Fun; Gotye; Carly Rae Jepsen; One Direction; Big Time Rush; **The Wanted**

=== Special Achievement Awards ===
Favorite Humanitarian	People's Voice
Sandra Bullock	Christina Aguilera
