= A Bing Bang Holidang =

Studio album by Bleu
- Released: 1999
- Genre: holiday music
- Label: Lunch
- Producer: Bleu

Bleu chronology
A Bing Bang Holidang (1999)	Workaday Day EP (2000)

A Bing Bang Holidang is a charity holiday music album by Bleu. Released in 1999, it was released as a benefit for Boston Institute for Arts Therapy and featured contributions from Boston musicians and bands such as Guster, The Mighty Mighty Bosstones, Kay Hanley, and Bill Janovitz.

== Track listing ==
Sources: Official Site, Allmusic

No.	Title	Writer(s)	Length
1.	"Mele Kalikimaka"	Anderson	2:06
2.	"Jingle Bells"	Bleu , Pierpont	2:58
3.	"Boston All Star 12 Dayz"	Bleu	4:18
4.	"Snow Day"	Bleu	2:18
5.	"Carol of the Bells"	Bleu , Traditional	2:49
6.	"Silent Night"	Gruber, Mohr	4:00
7.	"Everybody Knows It's Christmas"	Bleu	2:00
8.	"I Want My Christmas Back"	Bleu , Dryer	3:56
9.	"Snowfall in the City"	Bleu	2:37
10.	"Bing Bang Holidang"	Bleu , Dryer	2:28
11.	"Merry Christmas and Goodnight"
