= Holiday music =

Holiday music may refer to multiple genres of music played during various holiday seasons:

- Aguinaldo music
- Christmas music
- Halloween music
- Hanukkah music
- American patriotic music
- Carol music
- Parranda
- Rara music
- Murga
- Caramelles

== See also ==
- Holiday (disambiguation) § Music
