= Four (Bleu album) =

Studio album by Bleu
- Released: 2010
- Genre: Indie Rock
- Length: 43:06
- Label: The Major Label
- Producer: Bleu

Bleu chronology
A Watched Pot (2003)	Four (2010)	To Hell with You (2014)

Professional ratings
Review scores
Source	Rating
AllMusic	4/5 stars
Classic Rock	7/10 stars

Four is the 4th studio album by Bleu. The album was part of a crowd funding campaign at kickstarter.com. The campaign funded about 40.000 $, which was far more than Bleu expected.

Bleu said: "It's changed my whole world, I have a completely new outlook on my career and my life. It sounds dramatic, but it's really true."

As a result of fans' contributions, he's been able to launch his own record label and put Four out himself in North America. UK indie label Lojinx acquired the rights to release the "Four" in Europe. Bleu was stunned by the enthusiasm of his loyal fan base, "I was playing a show a couple of weeks ago and told everybody about the whole thing," he recalls. "I started crying onstage."

Bleu recalls that the title for "Dead in the Mornin'" preceded the actual song by a fairly long stretch. "I was thinking about my mortality when I came up with the title, but I didn't want to write this melancholy dirge," he points out. "Then I thought, 'What if it's a big gospel rave-up?' When I think about my death, my funeral – which we all do – my great desire is that it'll be a celebration, a party. Everybody wants that New Orleans-style funeral. It IS the best way to send somebody off. It's personal, but tongue-in-cheek."

The story-song "Singin' in Tongues" also contains what Bleu admits is a religious subtext: "It's not really about me," he relates, "but it does address the way music has saved me from total destruction. There's a lot of God in it."

He acknowledges putting what he calls "a lot of weirdly morbid, upbeat stuff" on Four, noting various references to death (albeit mostly in high-energy rock settings) throughout. "Needless to say," he adds, "my mom's not too happy about it."

"Like everyone else, I'm always grappling with these issues of death, God, the afterlife, my legacy – all the real things," Bleu adds of the album's themes. "That's reflected on this record; it's not just a bunch of love songs." Of course, the love songs it does include are choice, notably the exquisitely tender "In Love with My Lover" and the Lennon-esque, orchestral torch number "How Blue." As always, he insists, "I'm trying to find new angles on classic subjects."

Official release of Four was on September 5, 2010 on the label "The Major Label".

== Track listing ==
1. "Singin' in Tongues"
2. "B.O.S.T.O.N."
3. "How Blue"
4. "Dead in the Mornin'"
5. "In Love with My Lover"
6. "When the Shit Hits the Fan"
7. "I'll Know It When I See It"
8. "Evil Twin"
9. "Ya Catch More Flies with Honey Than Vinegar"
10. "Everything Is Fine"
11. "My Own Personal Jesus" (bonus track)
