= Nina Terrero =

Nina Terrero is an entertainment journalist and on-air reporter residing in New York City.

== Early life ==
Born to parents of Puerto Rican and Dominican descent, Terrero was born and raised in central New Jersey.

== Education ==
Terrero attended Cornell University, where she earned a degree in government with dual minors in Science & Technology Studies and Law & Society. As a junior in college, Terrero traveled abroad to study Asian Security and International Relations at University of St. Andrews in St. Andrews, Scotland. She is also a graduate of Columbia University, where she earned a master's degree in Government.

== Career ==
Terrero began her career at ABC News. In 2011, Terrero transitioned to NBC Latino, a Hispanic-audience digital news property of NBC News. A member of NBC Latino’s founding team, Terrero produced the site’s original, multimedia celebrity, fashion, lifestyle and food features, focusing on dynamic coverage of films, television, music, awards shows and entertainment news. Terrero has interviewed some of Latino Hollywood’s biggest stars, including Jennifer Lopez, Sofia Vergara, Marc Anthony, Juanes, Javier Bardem and Zoe Saldana. Terrero is currently a senior correspondent at Entertainment Weekly, where she covers film, TV, style and pop culture for both the brand's print magazine and digital news site. Terrero hosts various Entertainment Weekly-branded video series on EW.com. She is also a regular fixture on Entertainment Weekly's channel on SiriusXM. In addition to her work as a reporter, host and interviewer, Terrero recaps television shows including "Jane The Virgin," "Tyrant" and "The Royals". Terrero is a frequent guest and entertainment expert on both broadcast and cable television, filing appearances on shows including The View, The Wendy Williams Show, TODAY, The Insider, and more. She has also appeared as a co-host on PEOPLE's live stream news show People NOW and has also co-hosted NuvoTV's "The Collective," a cable show highlighting Latino newsmakers across entertainment.' '

== Awards ==
In 2012, Terrero was named one of Huffington Post's “50 Top Latino Voices to Follow on Twitter.” She has also been recognized for her health reporting by the National Hispanic Medical Association with a “Public Health Education through Media Leadership” award. In May 2013, she was listed as a “Rising Star of Journalism” by the Huffington Post.
