= Caramelles =

Catalonian and Andorran Easter songs

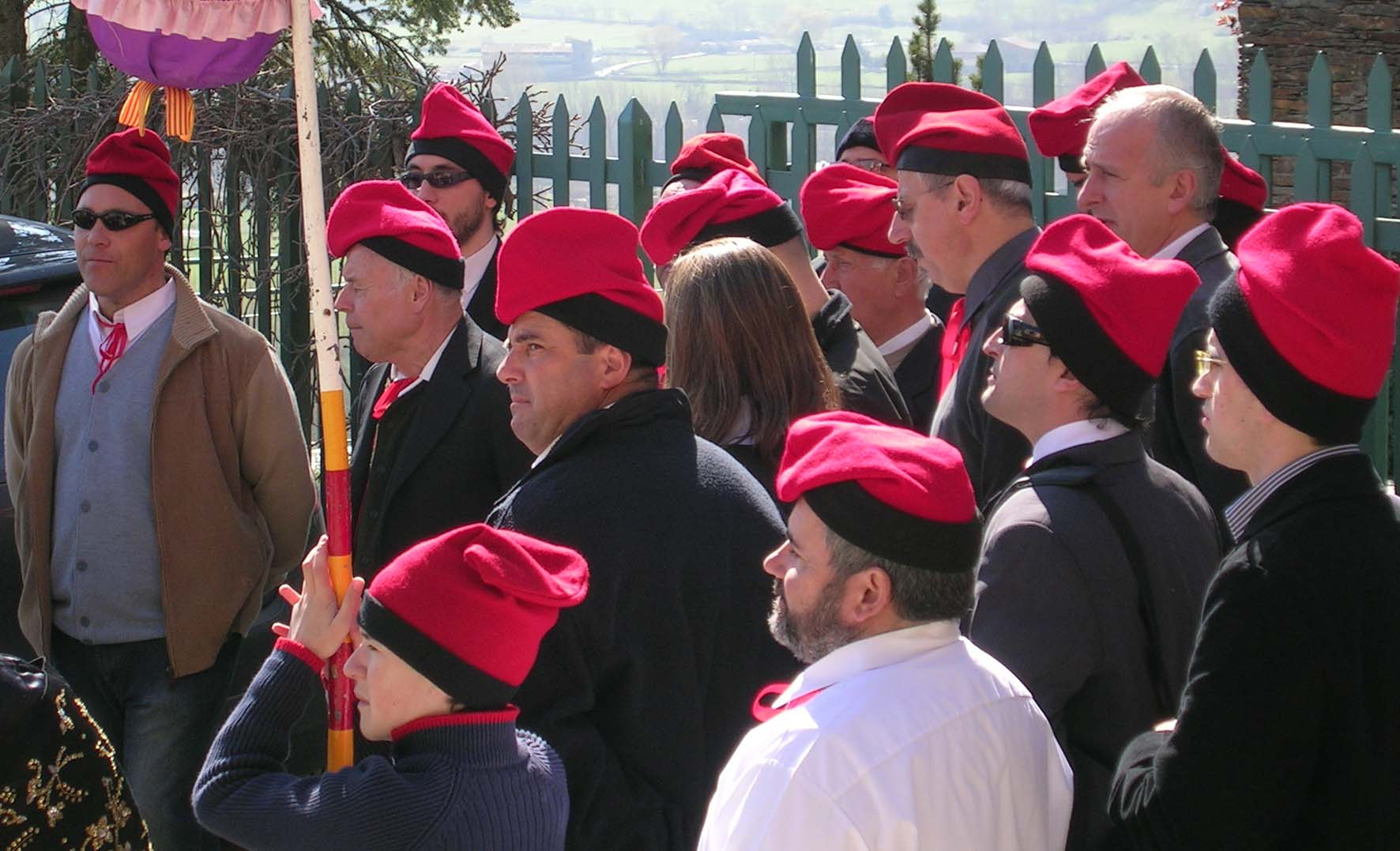
Caramellaires with the traditional red barretina

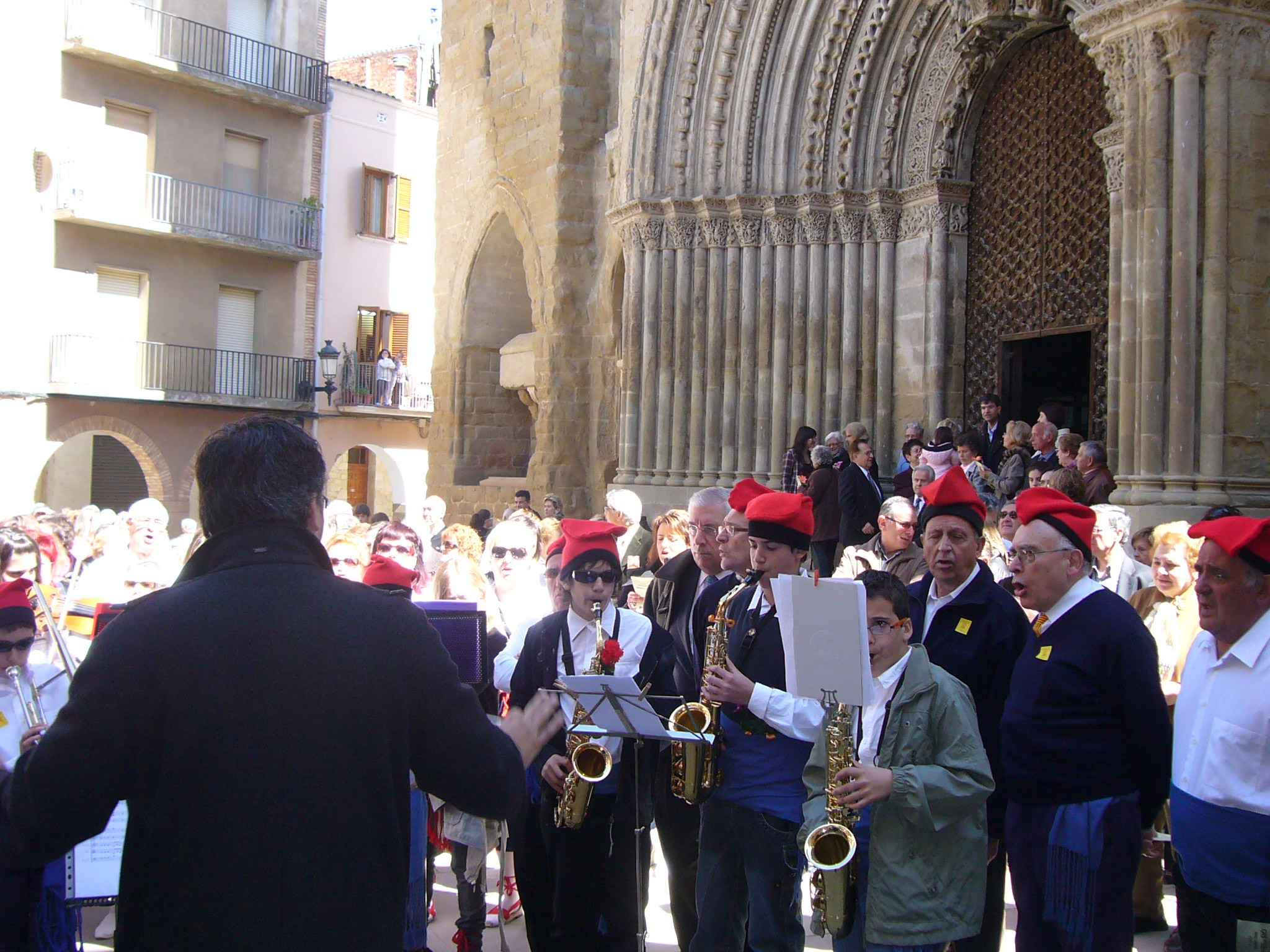
Caramelles in Agramunt

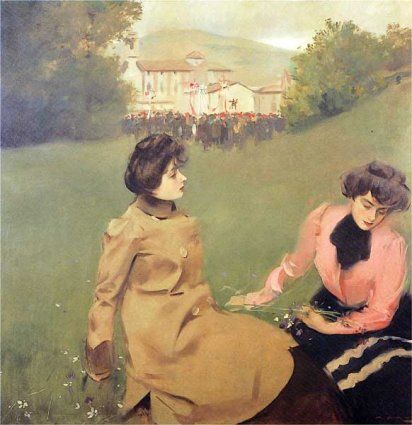
The Caramelles, painting by Ramon Casas

Caramelles are popular songs typical of Catalonia and Andorra, sung at Easter to celebrate the good new of the resurrection of Jesus, but also have a profane character. The singers (called caramellaires) are groups of singers who go out to sing in houses and farmhouses on Holy Saturday evening or Easter and Easter Monday mornings. They can be accompanied by various instruments. In the past, they collected eggs or money that people gave them with which they did a collective meal, basically egg-based, the same day, in the afternoon, or a few days later. The custom has many variants: in some places the singers danced between songs.

== Origins ==
No documentation has been found to prove when and where this custom begins, but it is known that in the 16th century, it was already celebrated in the rural world, and the oldest are the religious joys dedicated to Our Lady of the Rosary. Throughout the nineteenth century, choral societies adopted this tradition, introduced it to cities, and revitalized it with new elements and new musical pieces. For example, in the 1852 Clave Choirs statutes, caramelles was one of the activities of the institution. The earliest information regarding singing caramelles in Barcelona is from 1776, but it seems that the first gangs were not organized until the mid-nineteenth century and did not become widespread until 1880.

== Tradition ==
Generally, the group of singers stands under a balcony of friends and other people in the village to sing the songs. They can be accompanied by various musical instruments. The singers usually dress traditional clothes: white shirt, dark pants, sash and red barretina (a kind of hat). They carry a basket, tied at the top of a long rod and all decorated with ribbons, with which they reach the balcony of the honoree, who, accordingly, leaves his donation.

Among the profane songs, sometimes called goigs by extension, some are made to order typical foods, others are of a loving nature. In the cities, choral societies often sing compositions by well-known authors (especially those composed by Josep Anselm Clavé) or songs of a local and satirical nature, renewed each year.

== The caramelles of Eivissa ==
On the island of Eivissa, caramelles are sung both on Christmas Eve mass (called in Eivissa Matines), as well as at Easter Eve mass. Formally, they do not resemble anything with those of Catalonia. In this case, this is a redoubled song, a very typical type of song in the countryside of Eivissa that usually does not deal with religious matters, but in Christmas caramelles and Easter caramelles it explains the mystery of the birth or death of Christ during mass. Those who sing it are the caramellers, traditionally authorities or notable men of the parish, but they are currently members of the Ball Pagès group (a traditional dances group). The caramelles are accompanied by the traditional instruments of the Eivissa countryside: the flute, the castanets, the sword and the drum.
