= Air Traffic Controller (band) =

American indie pop band

- Origin: Boston, Massachusetts, United States
- Genres: Indie pop
- Years active: 2009–present
- Members: Dave Munro; Joe Campbell; Steve Scott; Adam Salameh; Emi McSwain; Bobby Borenstein
- Past members: Casey Sullivan

Air Traffic Controller is an indie pop band that started in Boston, Massachusetts.

The lead singer, singer/songwriter Dave Munro, had previously served in the United States Navy as an air traffic controller, inspiring the name for the band. While he was serving in the navy, he sent home demos from his music and later met singer/songwriter Casey Sullivan.

== Reception ==
The band was a 2015 Billboard Hot 100 Fest performer. Additionally, they have over 15 million Spotify plays. They were selected as a Showcase Artist for SXSW 2016 and made the NPR Hot 100 List for SXSW. They have also been featured a 'New Band of the Week' in The Guardian. They have also been featured in multiple Guardian and Boston Globe articles. Their first album, The One, was nominated for MTV's "Best Breakout Artist" award in 2009. Their song, "People Watching," is featured in EA Sports NHL 17. In 2016, they won the Independent Music Award in the categories of Best Indie/Alt. Rock Album (Black Box), Best Music Producer (Bleu, also on Black Box) and Best Indie/Alt. Rock song ("The House").

== Discography ==
=== Albums ===
- The One - December 8, 2009
- NORDO - June 26, 2012
- Black Box - March 11, 2016
- Echo Papa (EP) - June 23, 2017
- Dash - November 11, 2022

=== Singles ===
- "Sometimes" - August 25, 2020
- "After Party" - May 12, 2017
- "The House" - July 28, 2016
- "People Watching" - April 14, 2015
- "On the Wire" - May 26, 2015

== Awards and nominations ==
=== Independent Music Awards ===
Year	Nominee / work	Award	Result
2016	Black Box	Best Indie/Alt. Rock Album	Won
2016	"The House"	Best Indie/Alt. Rock Song	Won
2016	Bleu - Black Box	Best Music Producer	Won
2016	"The House"	Best Video	Nominated
2018	"Echo Papa"	Best EP - Rock	Won
