= Chris Mann (singer) =

American singer (born 1982)

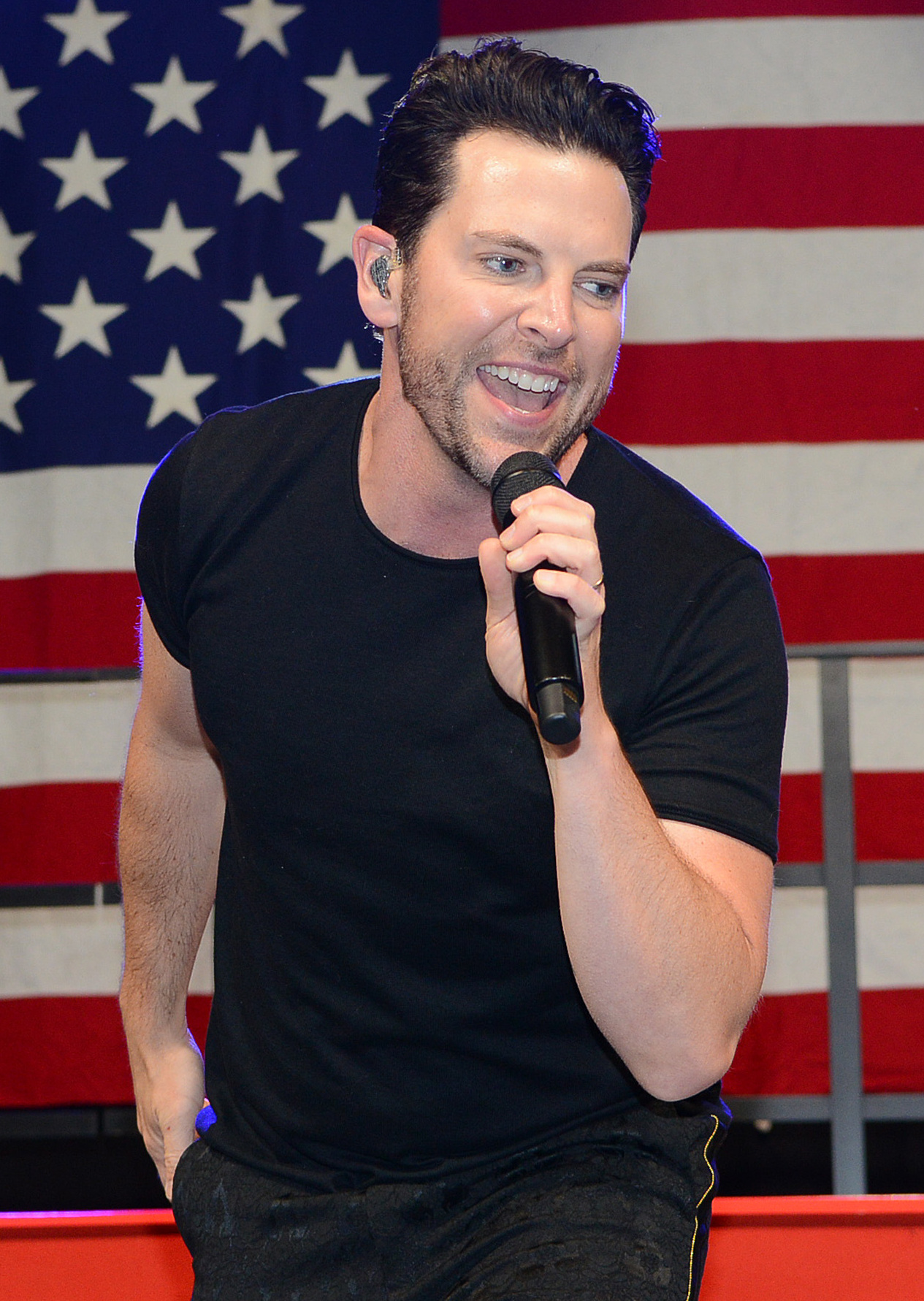
- Mann performing at the 2019 4th of July celebration hosted by the United States Embassy in Berlin

Background information
- Born: Christopher Michael Mann; May 5, 1982 (age 44); Wichita, Kansas, U.S.
- Genres: Operatic pop, classical crossover
- Occupations: Singer-songwriter, actor
- Years active: 2004–present
- Labels: Universal Republic, Republic
- Website: chrismannmusic.com

Christopher Michael Mann (born May 5, 1982) is an American singer and actor from Wichita, Kansas. He came in fourth on the second season of NBC's television singing competition The Voice in 2012. Mann came in first on Team Christina Aguilera and represented her in the final round. His album, Constellation, was released on May 6, 2016.

== Career ==
=== Early life ===
Mann attended Preschool in Wichita, Kansas at Discovery Place Preschool and later attended Wichita Southeast High School and graduating in 2000. Mann went on to attend Vanderbilt University. He graduated from Vanderbilt's Blair School of Music in 2004 with a degree in vocal performance. Mann was a member of the Sigma Nu Fraternity where his pledge name was Buttercup.

After graduation, Mann was cast in an Italian opera in Europe. After moving to Los Angeles, he obtained numerous studio and group singing gigs, including Dalton Academy "Warbler #6" on an episode of Glee, the Sundance Film Festival, and the AFI Life Achievement Award 2010.

His studio work has been featured in the film Avatar, Glee: The 3D Concert Movie, Letters to Juliet, Tangled, Sex and the City 2, The Smurfs, 2012 and The Philanthropist. His recording of "L.O.V.E." was featured in a commercial for season two of Khloé & Lamar, and he has recorded music with Heather Headley, performed with Katharine McPhee, and toured with India Arie and Idina Menzel.

=== The Voice ===
Mann participated in the second season of the singing reality show The Voice, ultimately placing fourth. He was initially chosen by judges Christina Aguilera and Cee Lo Green after singing Andrea Bocelli's "Because We Believe (Ama Credi E Vai)". He chose to be part of Team Christina Aguilera, on whose team he had hoped to be selected from the start.

He advanced to the live shows by defeating Monique Benabou in a duet of "The Power of Love". In his first live show, he performed "Bridge over Troubled Water" by Simon & Garfunkel, which earned him a pass to the next round by public vote. During the quarter-finals, he covered "Viva la Vida" by Coldplay, and was again selected for advancement to the semi-finals by public vote. He advanced to the finals, edging out Lindsey Pavao, after singing "Ave Maria".

For the finale, he soloed "You Raise Me Up", sang "The Prayer" in a duet with Aguilera, and covered Aguilera's "The Voice Within". During the final results show, Mann performed "Bitter Sweet Symphony" by The Verve for his final performance with previously eliminated semi-finalists Pavao and Katrina Parker. Mann consistently received praise from the other coaches; Cee Lo Green called Mann's voice "incomparable", while Blake Shelton called Mann a "powerhouse" and a "really strong singer".

==== Performances and results ====
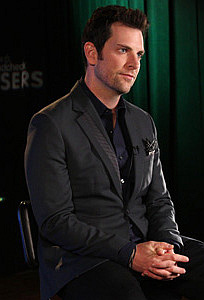
Chris Mann promoting Roads at Walmart Risers

Episode	Round	Song	Original artist	Order #	Result
1	The Blind Auditions	"Because We Believe (Ama Credi E Vai)"	Andrea Bocelli	5	Cee Lo Green and Christina Aguilera turned Joined Team Christina
6	Battle Rounds	duet "The Power of Love" with Monique Benabou	Jennifer Rush	3	Saved by Coach
10	Live Rounds	"Bridge Over Troubled Water"	Simon & Garfunkel	2	Saved by Public Vote
14	Live Quarter-Final	"Viva la Vida"	Coldplay	8	Saved by Public Vote
18	Live Semi-final	"Ave Maria"	No original artist. Written by Franz Schubert	3	Saved by Public Vote
20	Live Final (coach duet)	duet "The Prayer" with Christina Aguilera	Celine Dion and Andrea Bocelli	3	Fourth place
20	Live Final (coach tribute)	"The Voice Within"	Christina Aguilera	5	Fourth place
20	Live Final (solo performance)	"You Raise Me Up"	Secret Garden	9	Fourth place

=== Debut album ===
Mann was planning on releasing a Christmas EP before releasing his full-length studio album. The EP was released three weeks before the October 30, 2012, release of his debut studio album, Roads. While the EP was a Walmart exclusive, the album's songs were later released as singles in iTunes.

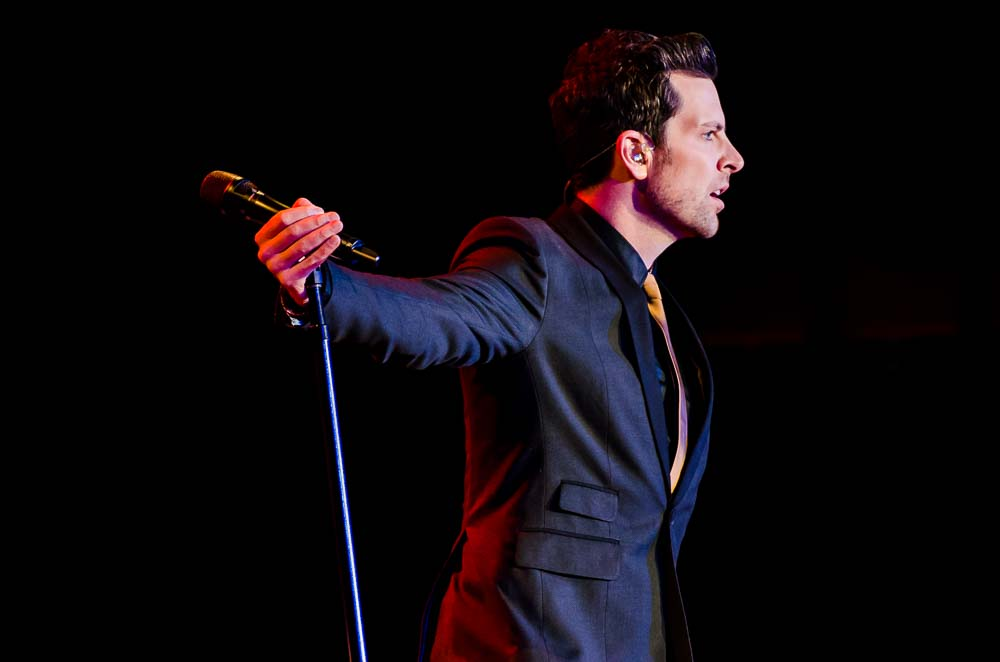
Chris Mann performs in Rexburg, Idaho, U.S., in 2013

=== PBS specials ===
Shortly after the release of his album and Christmas EP, Mann recorded a PBS concert special titled "Chris Mann in Concert: A Mann for all Seasons". The special premiered on WTVS on December 14 and became available for purchase on DVD and CD shortly after that. The special aired nationwide in March 2013.

While preparing for the second leg of the tour to promote Roads, Mann announced he had also recorded a Christmas special for PBS. The special, titled Home for Christmas: The Chris Mann Christmas Special, premiered on WTVS on August 17, 2013.

=== The Phantom of the Opera ===
Mann toured for two years with the North American tour of The Phantom of the Opera, in which he played the lead role of the Phantom. The 2015/2016 tour kicked off on May 27, 2015, at the ASU Gammage Theatre in Tempe, Arizona, US.

=== The Voice: Neon Dreams ===
In 2017, Mann was announced as one of several vocalists from the talent show The Voice to be part of a Las Vegas live concert series titled The Voice: Neon Dreams. It was to also feature season ten winner Alisan Porter, Mary Sarah (season 10), Matthew Schuler (season 5), and Matt McAndrew (season 7), and to be backed by a band led by Michael Sanchez. It was announced in October 2018 that the show would not go ahead.

=== COVID-19 parodies ===
In 2020, Mann produced several COVID-19-themed musical parodies on YouTube. Several went viral, including parodies of "Hello", originally by Adele, and "Old Town Road".

== Personal life ==
Mann married his longtime girlfriend, Laura Perloe, in 2013 at Maravilla Gardens in Camarillo, Ventura County in Southern California.

In May 2017, the couple announced they were expecting their first child, a son named Hugo, who was born later that year.

In October 2020, the couple announced that they were expecting their second child, due in January 2021. On January 11, 2021, Mann and his wife welcomed their second child together, a boy named Rocky.

== Discography ==
Chris Mann discography
- Studio albums: 2
- Live albums: 1
- Singles: 10
- Other charted songs: 2
- Extended plays: 4

=== Studio albums ===
Title	Details	Peak chart positions		
Title	Details	US	US Classical	US Heatseekers
Roads	Released: October 30, 2012; Label: Universal Republic; Formats: CD, digital download	175	5	1
Constellation	Released: May 6, 2016; Label: Dropped Entertainment; Formats: CD, digital download	—	3	4

=== Live albums ===
Title	Details	Peak chart positions
Title	Details	US Classical
Chris Mann in Concert: A Mann for all Seasons	Released: January 1, 2013; Label: Universal Republic; Formats: CD, digital download	14

=== Extended plays ===
Year	Title	Details	Peak chart positions	
Year	Title	Details	US Classical	US Heatseekers
2009	EP	Released: August 11, 2009; Label: Uppercut; Format: digital download	—	—
2011	Chris Mann	Released: October 10, 2011; Label: Dropped Entertainment; Format: digital download	—	—
2012	Home for Christmas	Released: October 9, 2012; Label: Universal Republic; Format: Digital download, CD (Walmart exclusive)	12	6
2017	Constellation (Unplugged)	Released: November 17, 2017; Label: Dropped Entertainment; Format: Digital download	—	—

=== Singles ===
==== As lead artist ====
Year	Single	Peak chart positions	Album
Year	Single	US AC	Album
2011	"Beautiful Life"	—	—N/a
2011	"Pretty Girl"	—	—N/a
2012	"Roads"	30	Roads
2012	"Unless You Mean It"	—	Roads
2012	"O Come All Ye Faithful"	20	Home for Christmas EP
2015	"L.O.V.E."	—	—N/a
2015	"Remember Me"	—	—N/a
2016	"Echo"	—	Constellation
2016	"Comeback"	—	Constellation
2017	"I Wanna (One Dance) With Somebody"	—	—N/a

==== As featured artist ====
Year	Title	Album
2012	"Redlight" (featuring Amiena)	Amiena EP
2020	"Reflection" (Christina Aguilera's song) (uncredited; choir only)	Mulan (Original Motion Picture Soundtrack)
2025	"The After" (featuring Sage X Price)	Original soundtrack for Arknights

=== Other charted songs ===
Year	Song	Peak chart positions				Sales	Album
Year	Song	US	US Dig.	US Heat.	CAN	Sales	Album
2012	"You Raise Me Up"	— (Note: "You Raise Me Up" did not enter the Billboard Hot 100, but peaked at number two on the Bubbling Under Hot 100 chart.)	46	19	—	US: 39,000	non-album songs
2012	"The Prayer" (featuring Christina Aguilera)	85	34	—	75	US: 52,000	non-album songs

== See also ==
- List of singer-songwriters
- List of people from Los Angeles
- List of people from Wichita, Kansas
- List of Vanderbilt University people
