= The Fun Wine Company =

American alcoholic beverage company

The Fun Wine Company, Inc.
- Type: Privately held company
- Industry: Alcoholic beverage
- Founded: 2010; 16 years ago Miami, Florida, US
- Founder: Joe Peleg
- Headquarters: Miami, Florida, U.S.
- Area served: North America; Latin America; Asia; Europe
- Key people: Joe Peleg (CEO); Christina Aguilera (CCO)
- Products: Wine cocktails
- Website: funwine.com

The Fun Wine Company, Inc. is an American alcoholic beverage company headquartered in Miami, Florida. Founded in 2010, it manufactures gluten-free wine cocktails, whose products are distributed in the United States by Republic National Distributing Company. In 2021, their executives has announced a global expansion to markets in Asia, Latin America and Europe.

Known for its "colorful bottles and unique flavors", its products was inspired by Miami's culture and street art scene. In addition to being met with positive reviews by wine critics, its products received numerous awards and accolades, including at the World Wine Championships. Founder Joe Peleg also acts as chief executive officer (CEO), while American singer-songwriter Christina Aguilera was named chief culture officer (CCO). As of 2023, Fun Wine generated $10 million in sales according to Benzinga.

== History ==
Founded in 2010 by Joe Peleg, Fun Wine is headquartered in Miami, Florida, and its first wine collection launched in 2014, being initially produced in Germany. It was later reported that its products began to be produced with "premium French grapes" in Southern France. In 2018, FIFCO USA announced a strategic marketing and distribution agreement with the company, aiming to "expand [the brand] across the U.S. market". As of 2021, the distribution of Fun Wine's products in the United States was led by Republic National Distributing Company (RNDC).

Aiming to expand Fun Wine's business in Asia, Europe, and Latin America, the brand announced American singer-songwriter Christina Aguilera as chief culture officer (CCO). In an interview with Rolling Stone, she explained her team up with the corporation and work as CCO: "At this point in my life, I wanted to look into businesses and things that I really believed in and things that I loved [...] In addition to being a wine enthusiast, I am a believer in encouraging self-expression, which aligns with Fun Wine's colorful and creative aesthetic".

== Products ==
=== Development ===
Fun Wine manufactures gluten-free and low-alcoholic wine cocktails, made with natural flavors and sweetened with monk fruit. Its products has been manufactured in a vegan-certified plant in the European Union. The company's initial collection consisted of flavors such as Sangria, Coconut Chardonnay, and Strawberry Rosé Moscato—featuring its slogan "Bringing the fun from Miami". In 2014, Fun Wine introduced the "world's first coffee-wine hybrid drinks", featuring carbenet grapes, espresso coffee, and a hint of chocolate. Aiming to "make wine more accessible", founder Joe Peleg later commented, "We want this to be something light... something that you enjoy with friends", in addition to targeting Fun Wine's products to Millennials as an "alternative to beer".

In addition to aluminum bottle to "handle the chemical characteristics of the wine", Fun Wine also is sold in glass bottles and was reported as the first wine company to introduce slim cans. Generally known for its "colorful bottle", its design—developed by Latin Grammy Award winner graffiti artist Miguel Paredes—is directly inspired by Miami's "beautiful area and city with multicultural scene". In an interview with Miami New Times, Paredes described the brand's package as "a message of fun and enjoyment of life through creative experience".

=== Promotion ===
On December 5, 2019 it was set the official brand launching event during Art Basel at the National Hotel. In 2022, Fun Wine promoted a special event shop hosted by Christina Aguilera in West Hollywood, featuring a variety of the brand's wine and exclusive merch designed for the Los Angeles Pride. The brand also have appeared as indications in Billboard and Rolling Stone magazine issues.

== Reception ==
=== Critical response ===
Fun Wine's products received with reviews by wine critics. At the 2018 World Wine Champions, Coconut Chardonnay was called a "welcome tropical departure from your average wine", highlighting its "sweet, tropical aromas of coco lopez, pineapple cake, limoncello, and ripe papaya", while Red Sangria—the brand's top-selling flavor—won bronze medal due its "solid spritzy" composition. Strawberry Rose Moscato eventually was called a "boozy soda-like wine" combining "aromas and flavors of sugared strawberries, strawberry soda, and cherry blossom with a supple", which earned it a silver medal in "Best Wine Cocktail" category. Reviewing the brand's Hard Bubbly collection, WRAL News praised its smell, low-calorie content and use of monk fruit as sweetener. However, The Huffington Post editors and writers was less optimistic about its wine collection, although considered White Moscato and Red Sangria "fine".

The brand's package and bottles also was praised by designers and experts. In 2021, Beverage Testing Institute described Fun Wine packaging as "clever exuberant anime design". Juliana Accioly from Miami New Times referred to its design as "a marriage of graffiti, landscape and pop art". Anne Marie Mohan, columnist from Packaging World, highlighted its line "in aluminum bottle with vibrant artwork that pulses with a Miami vibe". Mohan described it as "wildly exuberant", noting the Miami's art, fashion and music culture representation in each of its bottle designs.

=== Accolades ===
Awards and nominations received by The Fun Wine Company, Inc.
Ceremony	Year	Recipient(s)	Category	Result	Ref.
Beverage Testing Institute	2020	Coconut Chardonnay	Sparkling Flavored Wine	Bronze	
Beverage Testing Institute	2020	Cappuccino Chardonnay	Sparkling Flavored Wine	Bronze	
Beverage Testing Institute	2020	Espresso Carbenet	Sparkling Flavored Wine	Bronze	
Beverage Testing Institute	2020	Peach Passion Moscato	Sparkling Flavored Wine: Best Buy	Silver	
Beverage Testing Institute	2020	Strawberry Rosé Moscato	Sparkling Flavored Wine: Best Buy	Bronze	
Beverage Testing Institute	2020	Sangria	Red Sangria: Best Buy	Silver	
BTI Packaging Awards	2021	Fun Wine	Best Packaging: Wine	Won	
World Wine Championships (Note: The World Wine Championships is "America's oldest annual international wine competition [...] each category are judged by Beverage Testing Institute (BTI) trained staff joined by top wine professionals and buyers from retailers and restaurants using a consistent, proprietary methodology developed in collaboration with Cornell University".)	2018	Red Sangria	Best Flavored Wine	Bronze	
World Wine Championships	2018	Strawberry Rose Moscato	Best Wine Cocktail	Silver	
World Wine Championships	2018	Coconut Chardonay	Best Wine Cocktail	Silver	
World Wine Championships	2018	Coconut Chardonay	Best Buy	Won	

== Commercial performance ==
Fun Wine is sold in North America and Latin America, continuing to expand the distributions on others continents, including Asia, Africa, and Europe. According to Benzinga, Fun Wine generated $10 million from the sale of 461,000 physical cases as of January 2023.
