= The Shade Tree =

Nonprofit organization

- Official logo.
- Formation: 1989; 37 years ago
- Founder: Bonnie Polley
- Purpose: humanitarian
- Location: North Las Vegas, Nevada, U.S.
- Website: theshadetree.org

The Shade Tree is a 501(c)(3) nonprofit organization established in 1989 in North Las Vegas, Nevada. Founded by Bonnie Polley, it focus on providing services to victims of domestic violence, as well served as safe house to women, children and their pets. The center remains as the largest women and children's center headquartered in Nevada.

Previously referred as Jubilee Ministries, it worked in the basement of Saint Luke's Episcopal Church, until a permanent shelter have been established in 1990. While its overhead surpass more than $3 million annually, the organization has received donations by both public and private parties, including Ashley HomeStore, MGM Resorts International, and American singer Christina Aguilera.

== History ==
Previously named Jubilee Ministries, it was founded by Las Vegas, Nevada residents to provide services for abused women and children, whose shelter and resources firstly placed in the basement of Saint Luke's Episcopal Church. However, in 1990, the group renamed themselves The Shade Tree, and opened a new shelter in a building owned by Saint Vincent's Catholic Charities. Followed a period of limitations and small place conditions, Donald W. Reynolds Foundation awarded the group a grant that allowed them to open a new facility in the Las Vegas Valley. Bonnie Polley, one of the founders of the center, worked as deacon in the Episcopal Church, and posthumously had an award named after her. Since 2019, the Bonnie Polley Community Hero Award is destined to honors "long-standing work in raising awareness and supporting survivors of domestic violence".

== Organization ==
=== Donations ===
The Shade Tree maintains its operations and programs with donations by both public and private parties. As part of a revitalization of the center, as well to help its fund operations, Wynn Las Vegas donated more than $1.5 million and refurbish its kitchen, resident bathrooms and intake room in 2018. Between 2019 and 2020, American singer-songwriter Christina Aguilera destined to the shelter $1 of every ticket purchased to her first concert residency, Christina Aguilera: The Xperience, at the Zappos Theater located at Planet Hollywood Las Vegas. In April 2019, MGM Resorts International donated $30,000 of the proceeds from its 2018 Annual Women's Leadership Conference. In 2022, Retail brand Ashley HomeStore donated an amount of furniture to the shelter, whose goods was previously used during 57th Academy of Country Music Awards. Pardee Homes also contributed to the maintenance of the center in donations made in 2008 and 2013, whose amount exceeded $8,500.

=== Services and programs ===
The shelter offers numerous programs and services. In addition to basic healthcare, the facility provides an "on-site medical clinic, pediatric and prenatal care, adult medical care and vaccinations", and served 6,000 women in 2013, according Las Vegas Review-Journal. The Shade Tree also delivers a life skills and job training classes "designed to help residents achieve stability and self-reliance", a children's activity center and a house destined to the shelter residents pets. In addition to meals, the center provides daily mental health services, critical assistance to victims of domestic violence, and individual case management.

== See also ==
- Women's Center of Rhode Island
- Women's Center & Shelter of Greater Pittsburgh
