= Public image of Christina Aguilera =

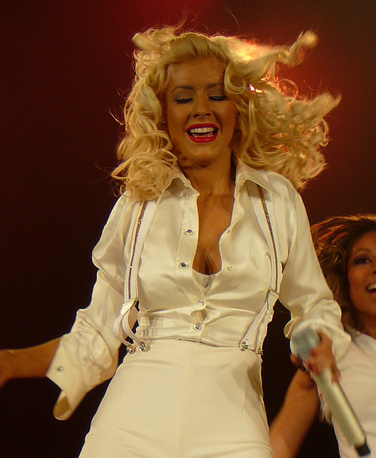
Aguilera performing "Ain't No Other Man" at the Back to Basics Tour in 2007, with her signature 1920s aesthetic look

American singer Christina Aguilera has received extensive media recognition as a cultural and public figure. Her public image has received press coverage for undergoing reinventions and transformations.

After debuting in the late 1990s, Aguilera rose to fame with her bubblegum pop eponymous debut album which saw her as part of the late 1990s teen pop wave. Since then, throughout her career, Aguilera has reinvented her public image numerous times. She broke free of her teen idol image by embodying a provocative, sexual image with her follow-up album Stripped (2002). This image received a generally mixed media response. She later embraced an old Hollywood style inspired by 1920s aesthetic with Back to Basics (2006) and later a futuristic image inspired by the birth of her son and her album Bionic (2010).

In the early 2010s, Aguilera faced a highly publicized era with negative media coverage following personal struggles and the commercial failure of Bionic and her film Burlesque (2010). She subsequently spent six years as a coach on The Voice. She saw some success with collaborations including "Moves Like Jagger", "Say Something" and her album Lotus (2012), before making a widespread musical comeback with Liberation (2018).

Throughout her career, Aguilera has been named a pop icon, gay icon, fashion icon and a triple threat entertainer and is closely affiliated with The Walt Disney Company, being honored as a Disney Legend in recognition. She has embraced a diva persona, often garnering polarized views and comparisons to singer Mariah Carey. Aguilera has been involved in various celebrity feuds, most notably with Eminem. She has also received media coverage for her fashion, style and physical appearance, often facing body shaming and slut-shaming comments.

== Mainstream perceptions ==
=== In the media ===
==== 1990s–early 2000s ====
Before her debut, RCA Records vice-president Nick Cucci noted in the July 24, 1999 issue of Billboard magazine that Aguilera would "not be a quick-burn teen artist" and called her a "signature artist". Producers had reportedly invested over $1 million worth of writers, producers and vocal lessons into Aguilera. After rising to fame with her self-titled debut album a month later, Aguilera began to appear in the media. Three singles from the album peaked atop the Billboard Hot 100 including "Genie in a Bottle", "What a Girl Wants" and "Come On Over Baby (All I Want Is You)". "Genie in a Bottle" is noted as one of Aguilera's signature songs and was described a "hormone-bomb" by Stereogum writer Tom Breihan, who went on to say that after its initial reception, Aguilera explained to the public that her "big hit was not about sex" but rather "about self-respect". "What a Girl Wants" is also recognised as the first new number-one entry of the 21st century. The song itself received positive reviews and its accompanying music video reached the top of the Total Request Live's (TRL) video chart for over five weeks.

After her debut, Aguilera began to be heavily compared to Britney Spears in the media. Due to these comparisons, Aguilera was consequently considered a rival to Spears. David Browne of Entertainment Weekly opined that Aguilera was "a good girl pretending to be bad" when compared to Spears. Christopher J. Farley of Time considered her a more impressive artist. The two had first met at 12 while co-starring on The Mickey Mouse Club show alongside peers Ryan Gosling and Justin Timberlake. Yahoo! News writer Elle Nelson noted that while the two have "never seemed to return to the same friendship they had as kids", they have since supported each other throughout their careers various times.

Early in her career, Breihan found that Aguilera "thought of herself primarily as a [...] young Mariah Carey-type", but was instead marketed as a bubblegum pop artist due to the genre's popularity in the late 1990s. The New York Times writer Lola Ogunnaike opined that "her label morphed her into a pop princess" despite Aguilera's protests. Aguilera herself later noted her frustrations with this era, adding that she felt she was portrayed as a bubblegum pop artist who "had to play a virgin but not act like one". Aguilera was labeled as a teen idol, and has been named as one of the artists who revived teen pop in the late 1990s. Time magazine stated that she was a "pioneer [in] a different type of teen stardom", crediting her vocal ability as responsible for the phenomenon.

In 2001, Aguilera covered "Lady Marmalade" for the Moulin Rouge! (2001) soundtrack alongside Pink, Mya and Lil' Kim. Reports of a "feud" between Aguilera and Pink began to surface although in 2009, Pink revealed in an MTV interview that she had taken offence to executive Ron Fair pushing for Aguilera to receive the "high parts" of the song. In an interview with Cosmopolitan, Aguilera noted that "there was no drama whatsoever when all of us were on that stage together". Aguilera and Pink later reunited on The Voice.

==== "Dirrty" image ====
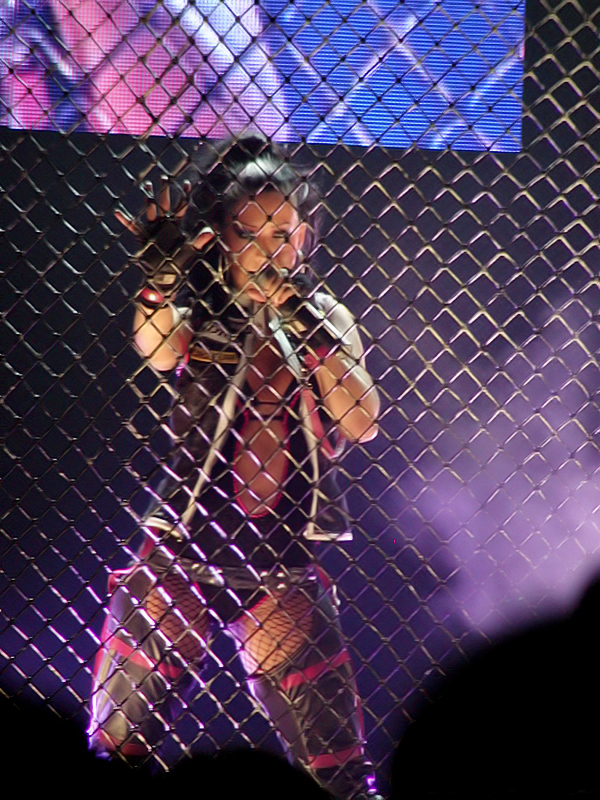
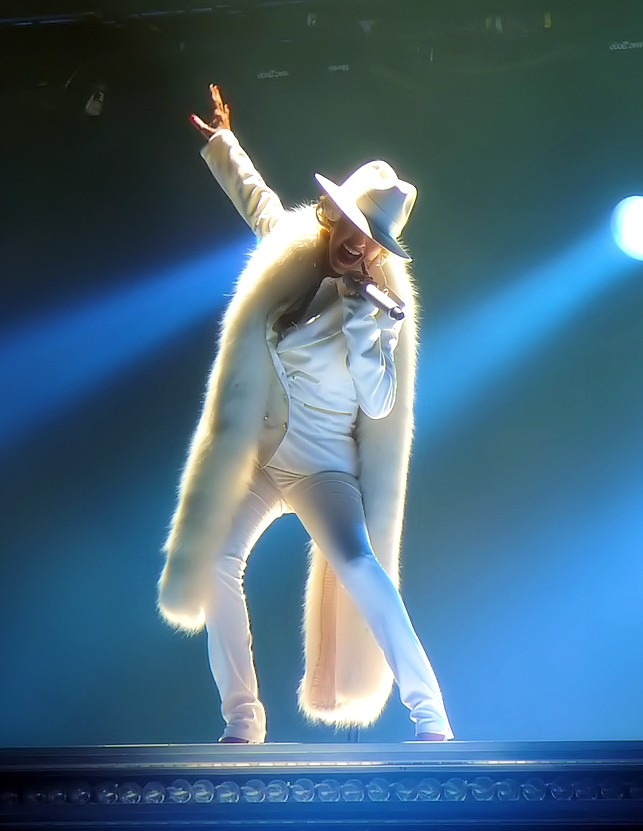
Aguilera embodying her alter egos "Xtina" (left) and "Baby Jane" (right) on The Stripped Tour and the Back to Basics Tour respectively.

Wanting to depart from the teen idol image, Aguilera filed a fiduciary duty against her then-manager Steve Kurtz for "improper, undue, and inappropriate influence over her professional activities" and eventually hired Irving Azoff to manage her career. She began to sport a new image in early 2002 where she dyed her hair black, got body piercings, and posed nude for several publications. She began to embody a new provocative and extravagant alter ego which was referred to Xtina. Aguilera's new image was widely criticized by media outlets. (Note: By various journalists writing for Time, The Village Voice, Vice, Rolling Stone, and Entertainment Weekly.)

She released the single "Dirrty" which garnered a negative response in the media with Entertainment Weekly labelling her as "the world's skeeziest reptile woman" and both Conan O'Brien and Simon Cowell calling her a slut. The music video for "Dirrty" garnered more negative criticism with various conservative organizations and moralists soughting to have the video banned on MTV. Aguilera also served as the host of the 2003 MTV Europe Music Awards and opened the show dressed as a nun before showing off a more revealing outfit, which also received media attention.

Writing for The Daily Telegraph, Adam White was more positive about Aguilera's new image and recognized that her "embracing of an overtly sexual image in the wake of adolescent stardom was a tried and tested route to adult success". Stephen Thomas Erlewine of AllMusic also opined that Aguilera reached "maturity with transparent sexuality and pounding sounds of nightclubs". Aguilera went on to release her fourth studio album Stripped (2002) which received generally mixed reviews initially but has since gone on to become one of the best-selling albums of the 21st century. The album's second single "Beautiful" received universal acclaim from music critics and contrasting media reactions compared to Aguilera's previous efforts. The song later won the Grammy Award for Best Female Pop Vocal Performance at the 2004 Grammy Awards.

At the 2003 MTV Video Music Awards, Aguilera opened the show singing "Like a Virgin" and "Hollywood" alongside Spears and was later joined by Madonna whom they both kissed. The performance received media attention with some media outlets retrospectively considering it one of the "most iconic" VMAs performances of all time. Despite this, Entertainment Weekly wrote that Aguilera is often forgotten to have been a part of the kiss, as during the moment, the camera man made the "decision to cut away from Aguilera's kiss with Madonna" to showcase Justin Timberlake's (Spears' ex-boyfriend) reaction. While Aguilera did not immediately respond to this, in 2018 she noted on an interview on Watch What Happens Live! with Andy Cohen that "I definitely saw the newspaper the next day and was like, 'Oh, well I guess I got left out of that one'" and praised her second performance during the show of her song "Fighter" with Dave Navarro.

==== Late 2000s ====
In early 2005, Aguilera began to embrace a new image which was inspired by classic Hollywood figures and 1920s inspired aesthetic. This new image drew inspiration from actresses of the Golden Age of Hollywood, such as Bette Davis and Marilyn Monroe, to go with her then-upcoming fifth studio album's 1920s–1950s musical direction. Vice writer Hazel Cills opined that Aguilera's new image was a result of her marriage to Jordan Bratman and wanted to "hark back to a time when women were ladies". She released the single "Ain't No Other Man" to positive reviews and during the song's music video, she adopted a new persona named Baby Jane, named after Bette Davis's character in the film What Ever Happened to Baby Jane? (1962). Aguilera released Back to Basics (2006) to positive reviews with Stephen Erlewine opining that the album was "all the more impressive" coming after the "near career suicide of Stripped".

In 2008, Aguilera adopted a futuristic image for her greatest hits album Keeps Gettin' Better: A Decade of Hits. She began to incorporate electropop elements into her music, which drew comparisons to the image of then-newcomer, Lady Gaga. At the end of the 2000s, Aguilera was named the twentieth best "Artist of the Decade" by Billboard, and was nominated for the MTV Europe Music Award for Best Act Ever. In a review of her greatest hits album, Slant Magazine writer Sal Cinquemani opined that Aguilera's legacy was attributed to her combination of Whitney Houston's vocals, Madonna's outspokenness and Mariah Carey's image.

==== 2010s ====
Aguilera described her sixth studio album Bionic (2010) as an album "about the future", and credited her newborn son as an inspiration and added that he "motivating [her] to want to play and have fun". The album faced mixed reviews from critics including Perez Hilton. (Note: Hilton later alleged that Gaga had used him to write "terrible things" about Aguilera and Bionic being a copy of her work.) Entertainment Weekly later named Bionic the fifth worst album of 2010 in a year-end list. That same year, Aguilera also filed for divorce from her husband Bratman and began dating Matthew Rutler, a set assistant on her then-upcoming film. Aguilera subsequently starred in Burlesque (2010) for which she received praise for her role. (Note: Various publications who praised Aguilera's role in Burlesque included the San Francisco Chronicle, Miami Herald, PopSugar, and FilmInk.) Despite this, the film received mixed reviews. W writer Lynn Hirschberg opined that while the film was a "disappointment", it is "rare for a pop star to have success in musicals (for every Diana Ross in Lady Sings the Blues there's a Mariah Carey in Glitter)". Aguilera attributed the film's reception to a "tumultuous set" where the first-time director Steve Antin, clashed with his ex-boyfriend Clint Culpepper, the head of the studio. Aguilera's performance of the film's song "Express" on the seventh series of The X Factor UK also received criticism for being inappropriate for pre-watershed television.

During the early 2010s, Aguilera began to face negative media attention particularly for her professional and personal life. In February 2011, Aguilera omitted a few lines while performing "The Star-Spangled Banner" at Super Bowl XLV, which led to extensive media coverage. She apologized for the incident saying, "I got so caught up in the moment of the song that I lost my place [...] I can only hope that everyone could feel my love for this country and that the true spirit of its anthem still came through". That same month, Aguilera performed a tribute to Aretha Franklin at the 53rd Annual Grammy Awards alongside various singers including Yolanda Adams, Jennifer Hudson and Florence Welch. After the performance, Aguilera's heels got caught on her train and she nearly fell. Aguilera was also arrested for public intoxication. In 2011, Aguilera joined the NBC singing reality competition television series The Voice as a judge. Entertainment Weekly writer Kyle Anderson opined that The Voice helped Aguilera "regain much of the cultural cache she lost in the latter half of the aughts". In 2016, her contestant Alisan Porter won for the tenth season marking Aguilera's first and only win during her time on the show. Aguilera left the show after its tenth season noting that, "It became something that I didn't feel was what I had signed up for in season one [...] You realize it's not about music. It's about making good TV moments and massaging a story".

In 2012, Aguilera took on a dance-pop sound with her seventh studio album, Lotus which received generally mixed reviews. Anderson opined that the album was "supposed to be a glorious victory lap" for Aguilera but that she had not quite out-lived the failure of Bionic and Burlesque. Pitchfork writer Claire Lobenfeld retrospectively agreed and noted that the album "was supposed to be a rebirth, but it faltered". She also received negative press following her performance at the 2012 American Music Awards which Entertainment Weekly described as a "embarrassing mess that left Aguilera looking more desperate than anything, and it did nothing to move the needle on Lotus". In 2013, Aguilera made a musical comeback with various collaborations; The Hollywood Reporter writer Rebecca Ford opined that she was starting to look "quite refreshed, excited and happy in her own skin". The collaborations included the number-one single "Moves Like Jagger" (with Maroon 5), and "Say Something" (with A Great Big World) which received universal acclaim. She performed the latter song at the 2013 American Music Awards which received acclaim for Aguilera's softer style of singing. She was named one of the 100 most influential people in the world by Time that same year.

After a six-year music hiatus, Aguilera returned to music with the release of "Accelerate" which became Aguilera's tenth number-one on the US Dance Club Songs chart. In March 2018, Aguilera appeared on the cover of the spring 2018 issue of Paper, titled "Transformation". Photographed by Zoey Grossman, the images featured Aguilera with minimal makeup and no photographic manipulation, debuting her freckles. Her appearance in the pictures received significant media attention and widespread praise. This led to other celebrities such as Beyonce and Adele, who had posed similarly, receiving attention. She released her eighth studio album Liberation (2018) to positive reviews with many publications calling the album her comeback. (Note: Various publications include The New York Post, USA Today, and Entertainment Weekly.)

==== 2020s ====
In 2021, for promotion of her ninth studio album, Aguilera (2022), Aguilera began showing off a red-haired look. In 2022, she performed at the Los Angeles Pride and used a green Hulk-inspired strap-on dildo during one of her sets which received polarised media reception. WCIV writer, Alex Schemmel, noted about the "appropriateness of such an outfit during an all-ages event". MEL Magazine writer Kate Sloan opined that "sexy stunts like this one have long been a component of Aguilera's image" and added that it was a proud moment to see an "international celebrity proudly [repping] queer sex on stage for all the world to see". E! News writer Ashley Joy Parker also called it one of Aguilera's "memorable fashion moments".

In 2023, Aguilera appeared with American rapper Latto on an advertisement, for the online food delivery service Just Eat and its Australian-counterpart Menulog, which saw the two artists performed a Hip opera song titled "Did Somebody Say". An 18th century-inspired music video was released for the campaign and received media attention, particularly for Aguilera's use of whistle tone which saw her "bring the house down – or at least a crystal chandelier". Later that year, Aguilera partook in the "What's In Your Bag" viral TikTok challenge for Menulog promotional video, and was described as looking "unrecognizable" with some users confusing her new look for Kim Kardashian.

=== Fandom ===
Aguilera's fan base are known as "Fighters", drawing inspiration from her 2003 single "Fighter". She is one of the most popular musicians on Twitter with approximately 17 million followers, and was one of the most searched artists in the world in 2002, 2004, and 2010 through Google. She was also one of the most popular searches in 2003 by Yahoo! Search.

=== Eminem feud ===
In the early 2000's, Aguilera was involved in a highly publicized feud with American rapper Eminem. Aguilera mentioned Eminem during an MTV special in 1999, noting that she took issue with some of his lyrics. Eminem first dissed Aguilera on "The Real Slim Shady" where he alleged that Aguilera had given oral sex to Carson Daly and Fred Durst. Aguilera's representative reported to the New York Daily News that it was "disgusting, offensive and above all, not true". She later referenced the feud at the 2000 MTV Video Music Awards while introducing Whitney Houston alongside Britney Spears who mentioned Eminem, at which point Aguilera dismissed him.

After the release of "Can't Hold Us Down" by Aguilera in 2002, critics noted its lyrical references to her feud with Eminem. The two met face to face at the 2002 MTV Video Music Awards where she presented him with the MTV Video Music Award for Best Male Video. In 2018, Eminem reunited the feud on his rap "Kick-Off" which mentioned her by name. Aguilera responded on Watch What Happens Live! with Andy Cohen that its "really in the past and [...] it was thirsty then and it's thirsty now".

== Persona and style ==
Aguilera has been called a pop icon and a triple threat entertainer in the media. Aguilera has also been nicknamed a "Queen of Reinvention", (Note: By various publications including the Evening Standard, E!, and Vice.) as she is noted for having reinvented her image numerous times throughout her career. Vice writer, Hazel Cills, noted that throughout her career, Aguilera has "experimented with every style in pop's lookbook from bleach-blonde princess showing just a little bit of skin, to a leather chap-wearing pop provocateur".

=== Diva persona ===
She has often been labeled a diva for her stardom and persona. Bustle writer James Tison noted comparisons to Mariah Carey adding that "[Aguilera] has mastered being a diva in the best way possible". Aguilera has also cited Carey and her music as an influence. Tison also noted Aguilera's sexual personality and "willingness to embrace her own sexuality" as her most important quality. Conversely, Entertainment Weekly writer Kyle Anderson opined that Aguilera's diva image was often heavily negative noting that she "carries too much cultural baggage with her" and that she "often fails to come across as particularly likable in interviews". BET writer Michael Arceneaux noted that while being a judge on The Voice, Aguilera was often accused of being a diva which was a result of a "bad reputation" from her "Stripped days, still making her susceptible to those sorts of rumors". Aguilera has also been criticised for her diva persona by various artists including The Wanted, Mary J. Blige, and JoJo.

== Disney Legend ==
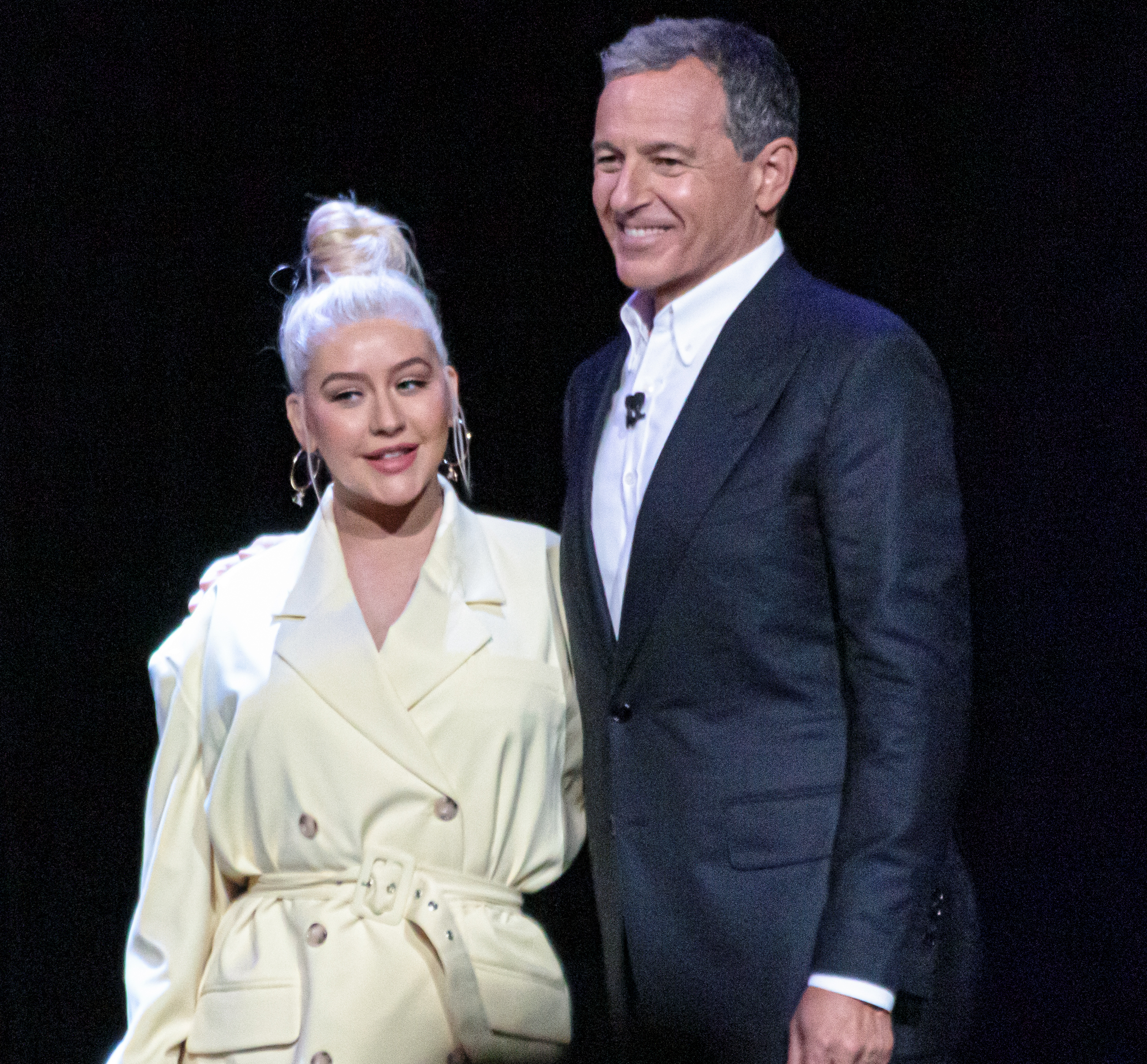
Aguilera and Bob Iger (right) the current CEO of The Walt Disney Company at the 2019 Disney Legends ceremony during D23.

Aguilera has had a longstanding relationship with The Walt Disney Company and was honored as a Disney Legend in 2019 for her "significant impact on the Disney legacy". Harper's Bazaar noted Aguilera's career beginning with Disney, calling her a "Disney darling". Hello! named her a Disney Princess. Her connection to the company began when she first appeared as a Mouseketeer on The Mickey Mouse Club, and was later named one of the most successful Mouseketeers to come out from the show. Aguilera was chosen to perform the theme song, "Reflection", for the Walt Disney Animation Studios film Mulan (1998) after sending a recording of Whitney Houston's "Run to You" to Disney. The song was released on the film's soundtrack and played during the film's closing credits. Aguilera also included it in her self-titled debut album and Billboard writer Mitchell Peters noted that the recording "shot the then-teenaged singer to stardom on the strength of her powerful pipes"

Following "Reflection", Aguilera began to appear in other Disney media including a performance at the Walt Disney World Summer Jam Concert (2000) and on Disney's 2 Hour Tour (2000). Her song "Blessed" was also included in the Disney Channel Original Movie Miracle in Lane 2 (2000). Her songs have also been covered throughout Disney media including "Genie in a Bottle" by Dove Cameron from the Descendants franchise, "Beautiful" by China Anne McClain from an episode on A.N.T. Farm, and "Moves Like Jagger" by The Muppets' Pepe the King Prawn from Muppets Most Wanted (2014).

In 2020, Aguilera re-recorded "Reflection" for the live film adaptation of Mulan. After its announcement, she tweeted, "Once a Disney girl, always a Disney girl". She also recorded a new song for the film, "Loyal Brave True", which was later shortlisted as one of fifteen potential nominees for the Academy Award for Best Original Song at the 93rd Academy Awards. During the COVID-19 pandemic, Aguilera appeared on the ABC television special, The Disney Family Singalong and its follow-up, where she performed "Can You Feel the Love Tonight" and "Remember Me" respectively. In 2021, Aguilera performed "When You Wish Upon a Star" for ABC's Walt Disney World's 50th Anniversary special, accompanied by the Orlando Philharmonic Orchestra.

== Gay icon ==
Aguilera is recognized as a gay icon. Most notably, her 2002 song "Beautiful" has been called an anthem for the LGBT community, as Aguilera dedicated the song to the community. The video gained high media attention for its positive portrayal of gay and transgender people. UK LGBT rights charity Stonewall named it the most empowering song of the decade for LGBTQ+ people, and for having "inspired millions of young people around the world". Aguilera has also campaigned for the awareness of HIV/AIDS, and also spoke out against Proposition 8 in 2008 noting that " it just doesn't make sense to me why you would put so much money behind something that stopped people from loving each and bonding together".

In 2019, Aguilera was awarded by the Human Rights Campaign for using her "platform to share a message of hope and inspiration to those who have been marginalized [...] bringing greater visibility to the LGBTQ community". In 2023, Aguilera was honored for her LGBTQ allyship and for advocating for the queer community at the Stonewall National Monument. Various songs of Aguilera's have been called gay anthems including "Lady Marmalade", "Fighter", "Let There Be Love", "Telepathy", and "Change"; with the latter being dedicated to the victims of the Orlando gay nightclub shooting.

== Physical appearance ==
=== Body and wellness ===
Throughout her career, Aguilera has received body shaming critical comments from media outlets and on social media about her body. In an interview with Glamour Aguilera noted that during the late 1990s and early 2000s, "the media's obsession with her weight was particularly painful", adding that when she "started to fill out" from her teenager body, her "self-esteem then was based on how skinny [she] was".

In 2012, she drew criticism over her weight gain from several publications, and received favorable media attention the following year after a significant weight loss. In 2024, Aguilera received media attention for another significant weight loss and began to spark rumours of using the diabetes treatment, ozempic. In response, Aguilera noted in her interview with Glamour that she is "not going to take it on" adding that "other people’s opinions of me are not my business".

=== Fashion ===
Aguilera's fashion has attracted significant media attention throughout her career, and she has been named a fashion icon. Jon Caramanica, journalist from The New York Times, concluded that "Aguilera will be remembered for her glamour and her scandalous take on femme-pop", while Janelle Okwodu from Vogue noted that she "has never been afraid to take a fashion risk [and] has filled her videos with jaw-dropping styles and risqué runway looks". Following her appearance at New York Fashion Week in 2018, Dazed named her one of the most stylish people of the year. Aguilera's influence on fashion has been noted by several publications. Samantha Sutton of InStyle noted Aguilera's influence on the rising fashion trends of 2021. Writing for Vogue in 2022, Christian Allaire said that Aguilera was "ahead of her time" when it came to her provocative image.

Since the beginning of her career, Aguilera has attracted criticism for her revealing clothes, and has been called a sex symbol. In an interview with MTV News, Debbie Gibson accused her of "influencing girls out there wearing less and less", considering that "she lives and breathes the sexual image". In response to negative comments, Aguilera stated: "Just because I have a certain image, everyone wants me to be this role model. But nobody is perfect, and nobody can live up to that". VH1, included in the list of the sexiest entertainment artists in 2002 and 2013; in publications from FHM and Complex, she received similar honors in 2004 and 2012, respectively. In 2003, she was chosen as the sexiest woman of the year by Maxim, stamping the cover of the best-selling issue of the magazine's history, and she was named one of the most beautiful people in the world in 2003 and 2007 by People.

Aguilera appeared on the 2002 MTV Video Music Awards in a blue scarf top paired with a mini denim skirt. E! News writer Gabrielle Chung called the outfit a "risqué ensemble" topped off with a white cap which was "something that was all the rage amongst the fashionable peeps back then". The outfit received media attention, receiving polarising views. People writer Zoey Lyttle opined that the outfit crowned Aguilera a "fashion queen of the aughts". Aguilera's outfits from her Stripped era and music video for "Dirrty" has often been replicated by celebrities and influencers for Halloween. In 2016, American media personality Kylie Jenner replicated Aguilera's "Dirrty" outfit which received a positive reception.
