= World Hunger Relief =

Charity campaign

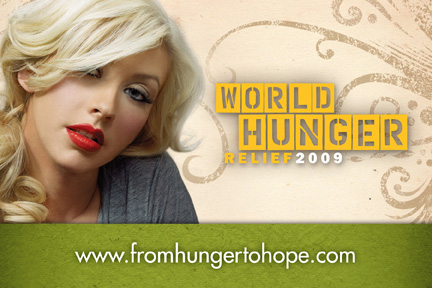

World Hunger Relief is a hunger relief charity campaign run by United States fast-food company Yum! Brands, to raise funds for the United Nations World Food Programme (WFP) and other hunger relief agencies. The campaign involves the company's restaurant chains worldwide in over 130 countries, including more than 43,000 KFC, Pizza Hut, and Taco Bell restaurants and 1.5 million associates.

== Overview ==
During the campaign, Yum raises money through all of its restaurants for WFP, and promotes the initiative to staff to volunteer. Since it began in 2007, the campaign has raised $640 million for the WFP and other hunger relief organizations, which the campaign says translates into around 2.4 billion meals, in 43 countries. The initiative supports school feeding programs, emergency operations support, and mother-child health and nutrition programs.

Singer Christina Aguilera, a WFP Ambassador Against Hunger, appears on the World Hunger Relief website and in other online hunger relief efforts.

== History ==
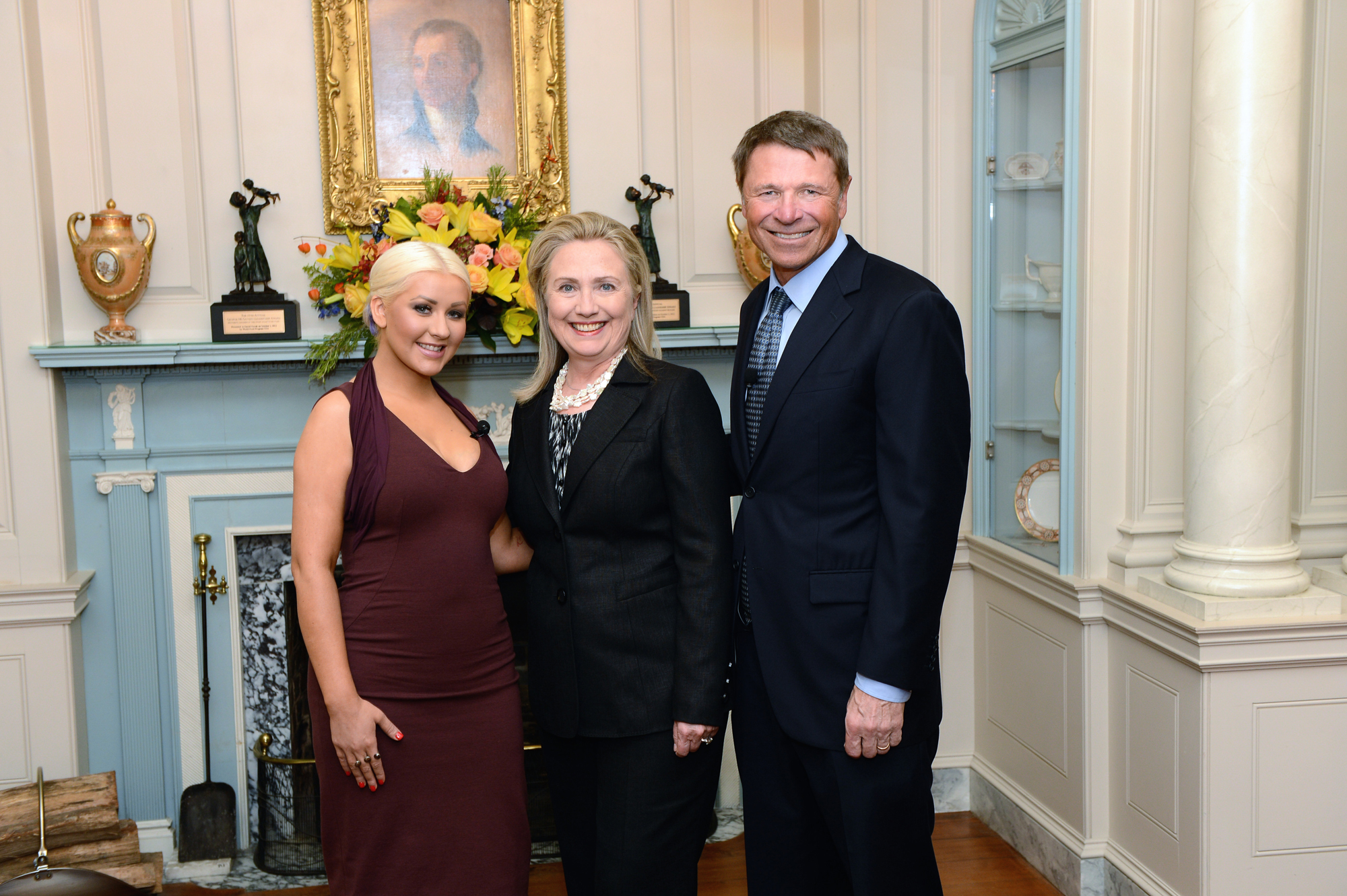
Secretary Clinton, Christina Aguilera, and David Novak honored at World Food Program-USA’s Annual George McGovern Leadership Award Ceremony at the U.S. Department of State in Washington, D.C., October 3, 2012

To mark its tenth anniversary in 2007, US fast-food corporation Yum! Brands partnered with the United Nations World Food Programme (WFP) to establish an annual hunger relief campaign, World Hunger Relief, to raise awareness, volunteerism, and funds for the WFP and other hunger relief organizations.

At the Clinton Global Initiative in 2008, Yum! Brands pledged to: raise and donate at least $80 million to help WFP and others provide 200 million meals for schoolchildren in developing countries; donate 20 million hours of hunger relief volunteer service in the communities in which it operates; donate $200 million worth of its prepared food to hunger agencies in the United States and use the company's marketing channels to raise awareness of hunger as an issue, and attract volunteers to fight against it.

In 2012 at the State Department, World Food Program USA awarded Aguilera and Yum! Brands CEO David C. Novak the George McGovern Leadership Award for their work with Yum! Brands' World Hunger Relief campaigns.
