= Playground (company) =

American sexual wellness company

Playground For All, Inc.
- Trade name: Playground
- Company type: Private
- Founded: May 2022; 4 years ago
- Founders: Catherine Magee (CEO); Sandy Vukovic (CPO); Christina Aguilera (CBA)
- Headquarters: San Francisco Bay Area, California, U.S.
- Products: Personal lubricants
- Website: helloplayground.com

Playground For All, Inc. is an American sexual wellness company headquartered in San Francisco Bay Area, California. Founded in May 2022 by Catherine Magee, Sandy Vukovic, and Christina Aguilera.

== History ==
Playground For All, Inc. was founded in May 2022 by Catherine Magee, Sandy Vukovic, and Christina Aguilera. Headquartered in San Francisco Bay Area, California, it manufactures personal lubricants with plant-based ingredients, as well incorporate skin care elements to its composition. Aiming to bring Playground to sexual wellness market, it received participation from executives and founders of digitally native consumer brands in both San Francisco and New York City, including Jennife Goldfarb—chairman of the board of Ipsy—which initially served as business advisor. In September 2022, Emily Morse became chief sexologist at the company's Sex and Wellness Council to "encourage women to embrace sexual health as an essential part of their overall wellness".

In March 2023, Aguilera was announced as chief brand advisor (CBA) to "champion the brand's mission to create an open dialogue around sexual wellness". In an interview with Rolling Stone, she stated about the company and her work as CBA: "I continue to encourage women to feel empowered while owning every aspect of themselves, and to treat sexual wellness as part of a regular self-care routine [...] I'm thrilled to be part of a woman-owned business, and building a brand where women can recognize a product that is speaking to them". Magee and Vukovic eventually completed the team as chief executive officer (CEO) and chief product officer (CPO), respectively.

== Products ==
=== Conception and package ===
Playground manufactures vegan and water-based lubricants, whose products combines three adaptogens: ashwagandha, black cohosh, and horny goat weed. Each lubricant eventually mixes vitamin E, hyaluronic acid and bamboo extract in its composition aiming hydrating and soothing benefits, which eventually became the brand's "key differentiator", according Women's Wear Daily. The brand's developing ingredients was selected "to arouse the five senses and erogenous zones to amplify a woman's mood, mind and libido". Known as "the most sustainable packaging in the personal lubricant market", the brand mainly use post-consumer recycled material (PCR) for its packaging, including 50% PCR to each of its bottle and cap, while its boxes features 30% post-consumer waste. Regarding its shipments, the packaging were made with 100% recyclable material. Sara Spruch-Feiner, editor form Glossy, called Playground's packaging as "design-forward", as well described as the "best lube for discretion" by Refinery29. Co-founder Christina Aguilera highlighted its "pretty and soft" light pink bottle, pointing it as "something you can aesthetically feel good about putting on your nightstand".

=== Line ===
The brand currently sells the following varieties:

- Love Sesh, free of scent;
- Date Night, champagne and vanilla scented;
- Mini Escape, coconut and sandalwood scented;
- After Hours, musk and oud wood scented

== Business ==
=== Marketing ===
Serving as the launch video of the brand, a one-minute recording titled "Pillow Talk" was released on March 30, 2023. It featured Playground's founders and a brief talk with Emily Morse. In April 2023, co-founder Christina Aguilera promoted the brand during an interview to Call Her Daddy, a Spotify podcast presented by Alexandra Cooper. Aguilera also promoted the products with numerous posts on her Instagram page, in addition to sharing with her followers that Date Night was her personal favorite scent. Playground's lubricant line also appeared as recommendations in Allure and Rolling Stone magazine issues.

=== Sales ===
The distribution of Playground's products was led by Amazon; in April 2023, it launched at Urban Outfitters. According to reports by the fashion and beauty trade journal, Women's Wear Daily, industry sources estimate the brand will amass $5 million in sales in 2023.

== Reception ==
=== Reviews ===
Cosmopolitan columnist Veronica Lopez praised Love Sesh due its "adaptogens that enhance pleasure", as well highlighted its "cute" package. Writing for Women's Health, Lydia Wang shared the same point of view, calling it "best overall lube for sensitive skin", pointing its anti-inflammatory ingredient and "plant-based citric acid". Joseph Cheatham from Men's Health called Mini Escape as "a lube to soak up the fantasy". Cheatham also pointed its "smooth-as-hell formula" and "ultra hydrating" ingredients. In a review for Hypebae, Gigi Fong highlighted the brand's product "thicker consistency and smoother slip", as well recommended After Hours for its "most divine essence of musk and oud wood". Glamour also recommended After Hours scent, praising it for "lasts so long and smells amazing", in addition to don't "get at all sticky".

Editors from Refinery29 ranked Love Sesh among the 14 Best Lubes based on Amazon's reviewers, as well included Date Night on the Best Flavored Lubes' list, highlighting its "mimic natural lubrication". Prevention columnist Christie Calucchia called After Hours as "very subtle, woody, slightly sweet blend", although considering its price and glycerin in its composition as a "con". Writing for InsideHook, Logan Mahan described Playground's design as "adorable [...] the directive component of their lubricants is clever and fun". However, Mahan was negative for it "get sticky as hell if you're not reapplying it frequently".

=== Awards and accolades ===
Love Sesh won the award for Best Water-Based at the 2023 Cosmopolitan's Lube Awards, in addition to being listed in the magazine's 17 Best Lubricant for Women. After Hours also was named Best Scent on Glamour's and Prevention's Top Picks lists. Date Night was eventually ranked among the Best Flavored Lubes according Refinery29. Mini Escape also placed on Men's Health's Best Flavored Lubes list.

== See also ==
- Christina Aguilera Fragrances
