= Taking the Stage: African American Music and Stories That Changed America =

2017 American television special

Original release
- Network: ABC
- Release: January 11, 2017

Taking the Stage: African American Music and Stories That Changed America is a television special which first aired in the US on January 11, 2017, on ABC. The program was broadcast again in 2020.

The two-hour special documented the September 2016 inauguration ceremony for the National Museum of African American History and Culture. It was filmed at the John F. Kennedy Center for the Performing Arts. Music, dance, and dramatic readings celebrated African-American contributions showcased in the new museum.

Notable attendees and performers included:

- President Barack Obama and Michelle Obama
- Patti Austin
- Oprah Winfrey
- Stevie Wonder
- Quincy and Rashida Jones
- Tom Hanks
- Angela Bassett
- Samuel L. Jackson
- Will Smith and Jada Pinkett Smith
- Gladys Knight
- Jamie Foxx
- Mary J. Blige
- Usher
- Christina Aguilera
- John Legend
- Herbie Hancock
- Dave Chappelle
- Savion Glover
- Dave Grohl
- Octavia Spencer
- Ne-Yo
- Doug E. Fresh
- Chris Tucker

== See also ==
- 2017 in American television
