= Change (Christina Aguilera song) =

Christina Aguilera's song

Single by Christina Aguilera
- Released: June 16, 2016
- Recorded: 2016
- Studio: Los Angeles, California
- Genre: Gospel; adult contemporary
- Length: 3:07
- Label: RCA
- Songwriters: Christina Aguilera; Fancy Hagood; Flo Reutter
- Producers: Flo Reutter; Martin Terefe

Christina Aguilera singles chronology
"We Remain" (2013)	"Change" (2016)	"Telepathy" (2016)

Lyric video
- "Change" on YouTube

"Change" is a song recorded by American singer Christina Aguilera. It was written by Aguilera, Fancy Hagood and Flo Reutter, while its production was done by Flo Reutter and Martin Terefe. RCA Records premiered the song on June 16, 2016, on On Air with Ryan Seacrest. The song was dedicated to the victims of the Orlando nightclub shooting. The proceedings were donated to the National Compassion Fund to benefit the victims' families.

Lyrically, the song talks about self-identity and acceptance. Characterized as a slow ballad, received mostly positive reviews from music critics, who praised Aguilera's vocals and the song's empowering lyrics. The single reached number thirty-two on Billboard's Digital Song Sales chart and number thirty-six on the Canada AC chart. Billboard also called "Change" an LGBTQ anthem.

== Background and composition ==
"Change"
A 20-second sample of "Change".

The song was recorded for her forthcoming record but was repurposed and mastered in light of recent events, premiered on Apple Music, is Aguilera's way of honoring the victims lost in the Orlando tragedy and promoting peace. Aguilera writes in a message posted on her website:

The horrific tragedy that occurred in Orlando continues to weigh heavily on my mind. I am sending so much love and so many prayers to the victims and their families. Like so many, I want to help be part of the change this world needs to make it a beautiful inclusive place where humanity can love each other freely and passionately.

Co-writer Fancy Hagood (a.k.a. Who Is Fancy) revealed that he started writing the song in 2015 after a police officer shot and killed 18-year-old Mansur Ball-Bey in St. Louis. "I was just having a lot of conversation about race and minorities and how something needed to be done". "It just felt like so much injustice. At that time, the bill allowing gay marriage had also not passed. So the song was just a reflection on what was needed by so many — change." Other co-writers of the song are Aguilera and Flo Reutter.

"Change" is a gospel and adult contemporary mid-tempo ballad. The song is written in the key of G♭ major with a tempo of 82 beats per minute. The song alternates between 3/4 time and 4/4 time while the song follows a chord progression of G♭/B♭ – C♭ – G♭, and Aguilera's vocals span from E♭_{3} to D♭_{5}.

In January 2015, it was reported that "Change" was intended for Aguilera's then-upcoming, eight studio album, supposedly called Blonde. It was listed among nineteen other titles from the alleged, leaked tracklist. "Change" was then released in Spring 2016 and omitted from 2018's Liberation.

== Critical reception ==
Lucas Villa of AXS wrote, "[The song] is a little soulful tune with a heartfelt message capable of reaching the heavens in Xtina's hands." Spin's Brennan Carley praised the song, saying that it reminds listeners "just how vocally walloping Aguilera can be when she sings even the simplest of notes". Fuse complimented the song's "empowering message", and Sophie Atkinson of Bustle called it "haunting", as well as a "genuinely moving and beautiful piece of music".

Elton John praised the song, calling it "beautiful" and "very moving" during his Rocket Hour radio show. Luvpop listed it as one of the year's best songs, and Billboard's Muri Assunção believed it has an empowering value. Assunção also considered "Change" an LGBTQ anthem.

== Chart performance ==
In the United States, "Change" debuted at number 5 on the Billboard Bubbling Under Hot 100 chart. On the Digital Songs chart, it peaked at number 32, selling 27,063 copies during the week of its debut. The single also peaked at number 17 on the Pop Digital Songs. On the Canada AC, it peaked at number 36. It also peaked at number 40 on the Hot Canadian Digital Songs. Throughout Europe, it reached number 28 in Spain, number 47 in Scotland, number 78 in Croatia, number 121 in France, and number 173 in United Kingdom.

== Music video ==
Red-haired Aguilera in the lyric video

A lyric video premiered on Vevo and later on YouTube on June 16, 2016. In the video, lyrics of the song on a background of home movie, alternating childhood photographs of Aguilera with scenes that appear with red hair and chanting the subject.

== Performances ==
The song was performed for the first time at the Jimmy Kimmel Live! on June 23, 2016. On July 31, 2016, Aguilera performed the song at the Black Sea Arena in Georgia. In September 2020, Aguilera posted a video on Twitter, in which she gives a rendition of the song. The reason was the #YourVoiceYourVote campaign which encouraged social media users to participate in the 2020 presidential elections.

== Credits and personnel ==
Credits adapted from Tidal.

- Christina Aguilera – lead vocals, songwriter
- Manny Marroquin – mixing engineer
- Florian Reutter – songwriter, producer
- Dave Kutch – mastering engineer
- Martin Terefe – producer
- Jake Hagood – songwriter

== Charts ==
Chart performance for "Change"
Chart (2016)	Peak position
Australia (ARIA)	172
Canada AC (Billboard)	36
Croatia (HRT)	78
France (SNEP)	121
French Digital Singles (SNEP)	120
Portugal (AFP)	44
Scottish Singles Sales (Official Charts)	47
Spain (Promusicae)	28
UK Singles (Official Charts)	173
UK Download Chart (OCC)	43
US Bubbling Under Hot 100 (Billboard)	5
US Digital Song Sales (Billboard)	32

== Release history ==
Release history and formats for "Change"
Country	Date	Format	Label
United States	June 16, 2016	Digital download	RCA
