= Republic National Distributing Company =

Second largest beverage alcohol distributor of premium wine and spirits in the USA

Republic National Distributing Company, LLC (RNDC) is the second largest beverage alcohol distributor of premium wine and spirits in the U.S. with wholly owned operations in Alabama, Colorado, District of Columbia, Florida, Georgia, Louisiana, Maryland, Mississippi, Nebraska, North Carolina, North Dakota, South Dakota, Texas, Virginia, and West Virginia. RNDC operates in Arizona, Indiana, Kentucky, Ohio, Oklahoma, and South Carolina through venture partnerships. In total, RNDC employs more than 9,000 individuals nationwide. In 2019, its revenue was US $11 billion.

== History ==
=== Distribution Tier ===
The Twenty-first Amendment to the United States Constitution repealing prohibition led to the creation of a three-tier state-based system of beverage alcohol regulation consisting of the product supplier, distributors who are licensed by the state, and the retail seller. Individual states are provided with the right to control how alcohol is distributed within their own borders.

=== Company Evolution ===
The earliest predecessor company of RNDC traces its roots back to a single distributorship founded in 1898 in Pensacola, Florida. RNDC was created on May 1, 2007, following the successful merger of the former Republic Beverage Company and National Distributing Company. Both companies were successful, privately owned liquor wholesalers that possessed complementary characteristics, making them a perfect fit for a large scale merger. Acquisitions have included Julius Schepps Co. in Texas, N. Goldring, Inc. in Florida, and Best Brands of Oklahoma. It completed an acquisition of Young's Market Company in November, 2022, including Alaska, California, Hawaii, Idaho, Montana, Oregon, Utah, Washington, and Wyoming.

== RNDC Today ==
=== Company Locations ===
The Company distributes products within its specific markets for a wide variety of beverage alcohol suppliers ranging in size from local and regional producers to national and multinational corporations. RNDC operates a total of 42 U.S. office and warehouse locations across 34 states and the District of Columbia.

=== Company Statistics and Rankings ===
RNDC is a privately held company. In 2010, the company was ranked 71st on Forbes' list of America's largest privately held companies. By 2021, the company had risen to be ranked 25th on the Forbes’ list.

=== Withdrawal from California ===
RNDC abruptly left the California market with a complete layoff of employees effective September 2, 2025.

=== Shifting Markets for RNDC ===
Rival distributor Reyes Beverage Group is expected to secure 11 state markets from RNDC with the deal expected to be confirmed by May 2026.

=== Bankruptcy ===
In July 2026, RNDC filed for Chapter 11 bankruptcy protection, listing assets between $100 million and $500 million and liabilities between $1 billion and $10 billion.

=== Controversy ===
RNDC partner Chris Carlos, member of the RNDC board was escorted out of an Atlanta Hawks game in 2021 after loud comments to LeBron James that James described as "out of bounds".
