= Women's Center of Rhode Island =

Women's Center of Rhode Island (WCRI) is a domestic violence organization and safe house serving women and children in Providence and East Providence, Rhode Island. Founded in 1974, WCRI is a nationally recognized agency for promoting a violence-free America. WCRI is a member of the Rhode Island Coalition Against Domestic Violence.

WCRI services include a shelter, residential advocacy and case management, child advocacy, and court advocacy. The community outreach and education provides education to schools, community groups, local businesses, and service agencies. It operates Providence DELTA and the Men's Initiative.

Women's Center of Rhode Island was founded in 1974, and is the only center in the Providence/East Providence area serving individual women as well as mothers and their children who are victims of domestic violence.

== Operation ==
WCRI is open seven days a week, 365 days a year and it provides victim of domestic violence with services that include shelter, residential advocacy and case management, child advocacy, and court advocacy. Clients also receive the basic necessities of home cooked meals, clothing, shelter, showers, telephones, mail, medial care, and emergency assistance.

== Court Advocacy ==
Domestic violence court advocates help victims of domestic violence navigate the legal system by educating them about their rights and helping them secure those rights.

== Providence DELTA Program ==
Providence DELTA (Domestic Violence Prevention Enhancement and Leadership through Alliances) [DELTA] is a CDC-grant funded program.

== Volunteer ==
WCRI has over 100 volunteers providing services to victims of domestic violence. Volunteers can work in the following departments: Hotline/Front Desk Volunteer, Children's Enrichment Program, Court Advocacy Program, Administrative Volunteer, Community Outreach and Education, The Men's Initiative, and Maintenance/House Keeping.

== Statistics ==
2009

- 291 women and children lived at the shelter
- 14,000+ meals were provided to shelter residents
- 1000+ Providence residents received court advocacy
- 2500+ people received prevention education

== See also ==
- National Center for Victims of Crime
