= David C. Novak =

American businessman (born 1952)

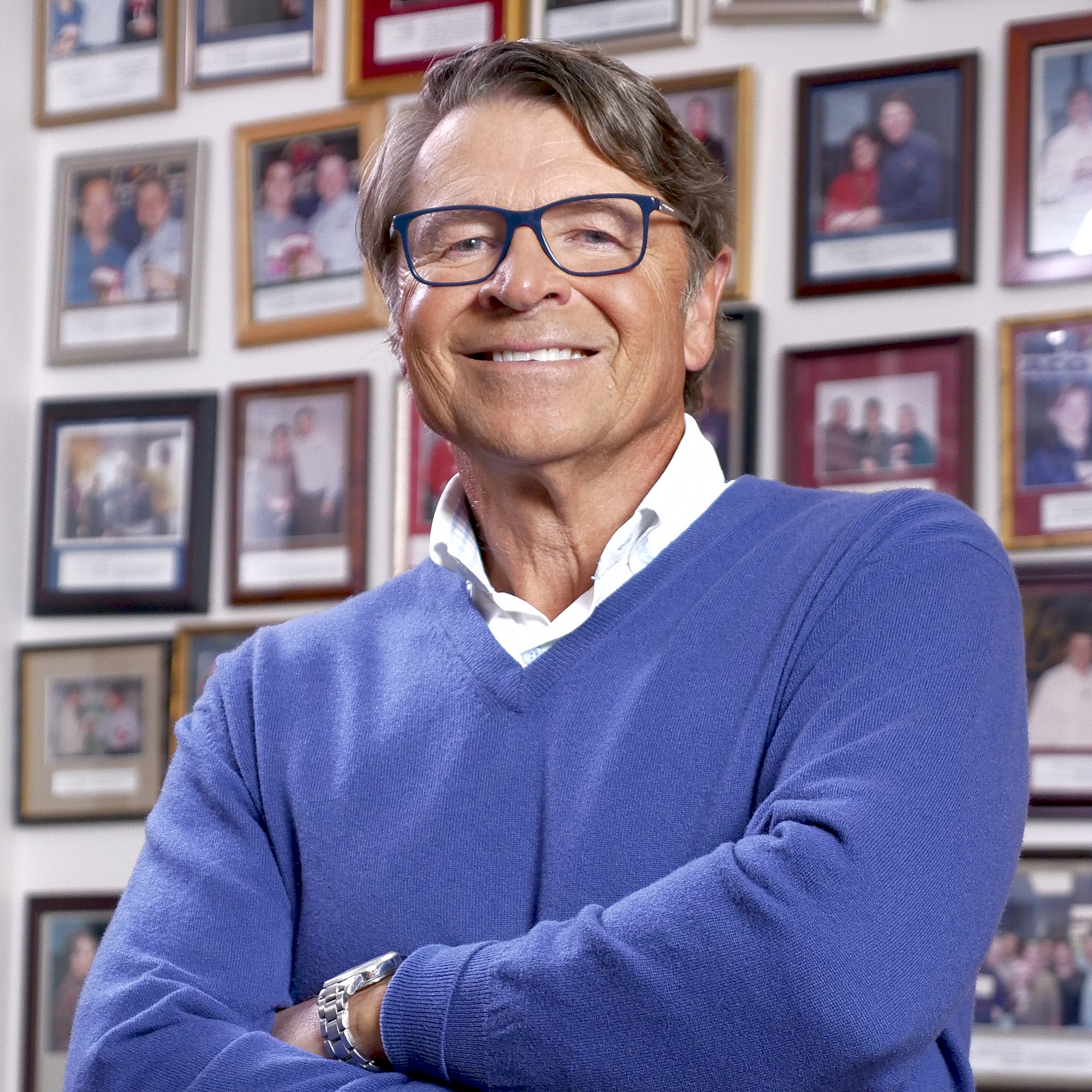
- Novak in 2019
- Born: October 30, 1952 (age 73); Beeville, Texas, U.S.
- Education: University of Missouri
- Occupations: Founder and CEO of David Novak Leadership; co-founder, retired chairman and CEO of Yum! Brands, Inc.
- Known for: David Novak Leadership, Yum! Brand's, Inc., PepsiCo, Lift-A-Life Foundation

David Charles Novak (born October 30, 1952) is an American businessman, author and philanthropist. He is the founder and CEO of David Novak Leadership, and co-founder and former CEO of YUM! Brands Inc.

== Early life and education ==
Novak was born in Beeville, Texas in 1952. His father was a government surveyor, marking latitudes and longitudes for the nation's mapmakers and would move the family to the next location about every three months. By the time Novak was 12, he had lived in 32 trailer parks in 23 states. Novak says the "nomadic" childhood experiences taught him how to be a better leader and helped him succeed.

Novak received a bachelor's degree majoring in journalism with an advertising minor from the University of Missouri and was a member of the Delta Upsilon fraternity.

== Career ==
Novak is the co-founder, retired chairman and CEO of Yum! Brands, Inc. (CEO from 1999 to January 1, 2016). During Novak's tenure at Yum! Brands, the company doubled the number of restaurants to 41,000, market capitalization grew to almost $32 billion from just under $4 billion and it was an industry leader in return on invested capital.

Novak was president at KFC and Pizza Hut, and held senior management positions at Pepsi-Cola Company, including chief operating officer and executive vice president of marketing and sales.

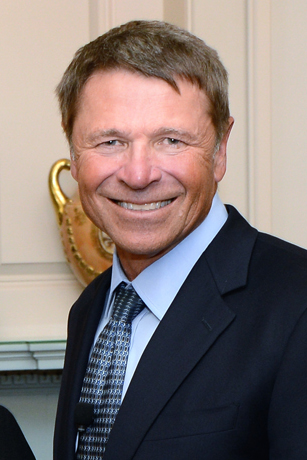
Novak in 2012

His first job was as an advertising copywriter at Ketchum advertising agency. He was executive vice president/director account services Tracy-Lock/BBDO in Dallas, Texas, serving as account supervisor on Frito-Lay products, Pepsi-Cola accounts and others, before becoming the executive vice president of all Frito-Lay products at the agency.

Novak is credited with the invention of Crystal Pepsi, a clear cola introduced in 1992. While it did not succeed in the marketplace, Novak stated that he learned a valuable lesson from that failure; even though every project had naysayers that would tell him something could not be done, "sometimes the naysayers have a point."

He was named 2012 Chief Executive of the Year by Chief Executive magazine.

Novak is Founder and CEO of David Novak Leadership, a leadership development method that teaches leadership skills through an online training platform, digital leadership training platform, podcasts, blogs, and videos.

In 2016, Novak launched David Novak Leadership, the "world's first recognition brand" on a mission to convince people of the usefulness of recognizing what others have done and close what he has dubbed the "global recognition deficit." He believes recognition creates an energized workforce and inspires people to do great things. He also wrote O Great One! A Little Story About the Awesome Power of Recognition.

In June 2022, Novak was announced as a member of a group that purchased Louisville's Valhalla Golf Club from the PGA of America.

Novak's other philanthropic endeavors include Lead4Change, Global Game Changers and the Novak Leadership Institute at the University of Missouri. Lead4Change is the largest privately funded leadership service program in middle and high schools. Novak and his wife, Wendy, also donated $21.6 million to the University of Missouri, School of Journalism to create the Novak Leadership Institute.

Novak is the author of three leadership books, including the New York Times bestseller Taking People With You, The Only Way to Achieve Big Things, O Great One!, A little Story About the Awesome Power of Recognition and The Education of an Accidental CEO, Lessons Learned from the Trailer Park to the Corner Office.

== Awards and honors ==
Novak has been very active in impacting the business world. As a senior management member, he has received several prestigious awards. He was recognized by Chief Executive Magazine as "2012 CEO of the Year," one of the world's "30 Best CEOs" by Barron's, one of the "Top People in Business" by Fortune and one of the "100 Best-Performing CEOs in the World" by Harvard Business Review. He received the 2015 Horatio Alger Award for his commitment to philanthropy and higher education and became a lifetime member of the Horatio Alger Association of Distinguished Americans.

== Publications ==
- Novak, David C. (2007), The Education of an Accidental CEO, Crown Business, ISBN 9780307393692
- Novak, David C. (2012), Taking People with You, Portfolio Hardcover, ISBN 978-1591845911
- Novak, David C. (2016), O Great One! A Little Story About the Power of Recognition, Portfolio Hardcover, ISBN 0399562060
