= Chief Culture Officer =

Book by Grant McCracken

- Author: Grant McCracken
- Subject: Business Book
- Published: 2009 (Basic Books (HC))
- Publication place: Canada
- Pages: 261 pp.
- Followed by: Culturematic

Chief Culture Officer (2009) is the eighth book by Canadian author and anthropologist Grant McCracken. The book looks at how modern business attempt to connect with culture. In the author's analysis he considers examples such as Dove's campaign for real beauty, and the I Love New York advertising campaign.

According to McCracken, the book is about highlighting the importance of modern culture for businesses, and in doing so, to create a position within them for a "person who knows culture, both its fads and fashions, and its deep, enduring structures": a Chief Culture Officer.

== Synopsis ==
In the book, McCracken recounts how corporations that successfully adapt to the cultural changes tend to prosper. His definition of culture begins with a distinction between fast and slow:

Fast culture is like all the boats on the surface of the Pacific. We can spot them, track them. Slow culture is everything beneath the surface: less well charted, much less visible

McCracken argues that when fast and slow culture meet, a convergent culture is created. He points to the preppy subculture as an example of a convergent culture that brands such as Ralph Lauren and Tommy Hilfiger have capitalized on. He also analyses the convergence of status, shifting from a class based value system to celebrity, and the cool convergence, an aesthetic that he states developed alongside the baby boomer generation.

Changing relationships, McCracken argues, between consumers and producers have created new opportunities for brands to connect with culture. He observes that whilst only 1 in 100 people create content on the Internet, the creator consumer dynamic used to be "1 in 10,000". McCracken believes this change allows consumers to become an "active participant in the branding process". He refers to Converse's 2005 motto as an illustration of this change:

We don't own the brand. Consumers do

For business's attempting to closely monitor culture, McCracken advises against employing "cool hunters" who "know only what suits them." Instead, he recommends creating a position for a Chief Culture Officer who is aware of both fast and slow culture, a "creature of many worlds, captives of none."

== Reception ==
Harvard Business Review recommended the book in their 2010 magazine, stating "a CCO is necessary for any competitive, consumer-oriented company". The Bookforum, however, declared the book "no different from the management tomes that have preceded it". Since publication a number of corporations have created the position of Chief Culture Officer (CCO). Stacy Sullivan, the CCO for Google, was appointed by Sergey Brin and Larry Page to "enhance and develop" the corporations culture Author and Advertising industry subject expert Lorraine Stewart has also advised Advertising agencies to appoint a CCO, to "create sustained competitive advantage and increase their own agency-brand value".

== See also ==
- Diderot Effect
