= Blank Face LP =

Studio album by Schoolboy Q
- Released: July 8, 2016
- Recorded: July 2014 – April 2016
- Studios: Art Dealer Chic (Los Angeles); D-Block (Yonkers); Encore (Burbank); Groovy Sound (Tarzana); No Excuses (Santa Monica); No Name (North Hollywood); Orange Room (Danville); Paramount (Hollywood)
- Genres: West Coast hip-hop; gangsta rap
- Length: 72:27
- Labels: TDE; Interscope
- Producers: The Alchemist; Cardo; Cubeatz; Dem Jointz; DJ Dahi; Frank Dukes; J. Lbs; Larrance Dopson; Metro Boomin; Nez & Rio; Sounwave; Southside; Swizz Beatz; Tae Beast; Tony Russell; Tyler, the Creator; Willie B.; Yung Exclusive

Schoolboy Q chronology
Oxymoron (2014)	Blank Face LP (2016)	Crash Talk (2019)

Singles from Blank Face LP
- 1. "Groovy Tony" Released: April 5, 2016; 2. "That Part" Released: May 13, 2016; 3. "Overtime" Released: September 12, 2016

Blank Face LP is the fourth studio album by the American rapper Schoolboy Q. It was released on July 8, 2016, through Top Dawg Entertainment and distributed by Interscope Records. SchoolBoy Q began work on the album in July 2014, months after the release of his major label debut Oxymoron. After briefly considering retirement from rap music to spend more time with his family, he set up a home studio and resumed working on the album in the summer of 2015; it was completed in April 2016. The album's production was primarily handled TDE's in-house production team, Digi+Phonics, alongside older and newer collaborators including Swizz Beatz, Metro Boomin, Southside, Nez & Rio, DJ Dahi, The Alchemist, and Tyler, the Creator. It also features guest appearances from Kanye West, Jadakiss, E-40, Tha Dogg Pound, Miguel and Anderson .Paak, among others.

Blank Face LP was supported by three singles, "Groovy Tony", "That Part" and "Overtime", and several music videos, including a trilogy of short films. Schoolboy Q also made appearances on The Late Show with Stephen Colbert and Jimmy Kimmel Live! and embarked on the Groovy Tony Pit Stops concert tour in July 2016, followed by the Blank Face World Tour, which saw the rapper tour North America, Oceania and Europe with Joey Badass between August to December 2016.

Blank Face LP received widespread acclaim from critics and debuted at number two on the US Billboard 200 and number one on the US Top R&B/Hip-Hop Albums chart, selling 74,000 units in its first week. In 2018, the album was certified Gold by the Recording Industry Association of America (RIAA). "That Part" also reached number 40 on the Billboard Hot 100 singles chart, and was certified double-platinum by the RIAA. At the 59th Annual Grammy Awards in 2017, the album received a nomination for Best Rap Album, while "That Part" was nominated for Best Rap Performance. In 2022, Rolling Stone ranked the album at number 164 on its list of "The 200 Greatest Hip Hop Albums of All Time".

== Background and recording ==
In March 2012, Schoolboy Q was signed to major record label Interscope Records as part of a distribution deal with Top Dawg Entertainment (TDE) involving his group Black Hippy, featuring labelmate Kendrick Lamar, who signed a separate deal with Aftermath/Interscope. In February 2014, he released his Interscope debut, Oxymoron, which debuted at number one on the Billboard 200 chart and spawned the top 40 hit single "Studio", featuring BJ the Chicago Kid. SchoolBoy Q toured in support of the album for a year and a half, and it was eventually certified platinum by the Recording Industry Association of America (RIAA). In a July 2014 interview with Billboard, Schoolboy Q revealed he was in the "beginning stages" of recording his follow-up to the album. On September 9, 2014, he told HotNewHipHop that he had begun recording the album but was still unsure of its direction.

SchoolBoy Q initially considered retiring from rap music after touring in support of Oxymoron to spend more time with his family and his daughter Joy; he regretted the long periods he spent away from them promoting the album. "When I came back [from touring], [Joy] was doing different things, talking different", he told he told MTV News in 2016. "I'm at the crucial years of her life—she's only seven years old, so every time I'm gone for a certain amount of time, I come back, she's doing something new. I got kind of tired of missing that." Neither TDE nor Interscope were rushing him to record a new album, and he did not plan on informing them of his retirement: "It was just a thing where it was just like I'm never gonna give 'em my album so they'll get the point." After almost a year away, he decided to end his retirement and resumed recording in the summer of 2015. He set up a home recording studio to work on the album, allowing him to focus on being a father and reduce his press commitments. In a 2016 interview with Rolling Stone, Schoolboy Q revealed that his initial recording sessions for Blank Face LP resulted in "depressed rap"; nothing from those sessions made it on to the album. The album was largely finished by December 2015; on April 28, 2016, Schoolboy Q announced that it had been completed, and turned in for mixing.

Blank Face LP was primarily produced by TDE's in-house production team Digi+Phonics, composed of Tae Beast, Willie B. and Sounwave. Its production saw the return of Nez & Rio, DJ Dahi, The Alchemist, and Tyler, the Creator, whom appeared on SchoolBoy Q's previous albums, alongside new collaborators such as Swizz Beatz, Metro Boomin and Southside. Kanye West contributed a verse and handled the production on the second single, "That Part", alongside Cardo, Yung Exclusive and Cubeatz. In a June 2016 Twitter Q&A with his fans, Schoolboy Q revealed that frequent collaborator ASAP Rocky, with whom he has recorded several songs, such as "Brand New Guy", "Hands on the Wheel", "Electric Body" and "Californication", was scheduled to appear on the album but producer Pharrell Williams had given the instrumental of the song they worked on to another artist.

The instrumental for "By Any Means" was an unused Kendrick Lamar beat that SchoolBoy Q found while looking through his computer. SchoolBoy Q said that he had attempted to work with Lamar on "Overtime", but that he rejected it after an attempt at recording vocals. TDE founder Anthony "Top Dawg" Tiffith heard the song and wanted it to be included on the album, but Q did not want his singing part to be used and subsequently requested Miguel's presence on the track. He then recruited Justine Skye after asking then-TDE president Dave Free for suggestions. "I didn't know much about Justine. I heard her voice I looked, she's beautiful and she sings good. I need her on this record. There you go, you have the record." Prior to the album's release, rumors circulated that Lamar had produced "Overtime", which SchoolBoy Q addressed during an interview with Hot 97; "I wasn't there to see him produce it but I remember seeing Cardo produce it. I mean I think Kendrick got some background vocals. He's done a lot of background vocals for me."

== Release and promotion ==
On January 26, 2016, SchoolBoy Q posted a teaser video for "Groovy Tony" on Instagram. On February 24, 2016, Tiffith announced that Schoolboy Q would release the follow-up to Oxymoron before the summer. After some delays, he confirmed on June 2, 2016, that it would be released on July 8. On June 14, he unveiled the album's title as Blank Face LP, while also unveiling what was thought to be the album's cover art. The album was originally titled Ghost Face, after Ghostface Killah, but Schoolboy Q later changed it to Blank Face as he thought it was "too corny to name it right after a rapper". The initial artwork made use of the notorious Crying Jordan meme, with his face blurred out. On June 16, Schoolboy Q released what was thought to be the cover art for the deluxe edition of the album, which features 2016 US presidential candidate Donald Trump, with his face blurred out as well. However, a few days later, in an interview with TMZ, Schoolboy Q revealed that he was "trolling" his fans and later unveiled the official album cover. On June 18, 2016, Schoolboy Q released a trailer for Blank Face LP, which previewed a new song. On June 21, he released the second trailer as promotion for the short film, which was co-directed by Kendrick Lamar and the Lil Homies (a.k.a. Lamar and Dave Free). On June 23, Schoolboy Q revealed the track listing for Blank Face LP. The following day, the album's production credits were revealed.

"Groovy Tony" was released as the lead single from Blank Face LP on April 5, 2016, alongside a music video directed by Jack Begert and the Little Homies. On May 13, 2016, Interscope began promoting "That Part" via urban and rhythmic radio formats in North America, as the album's second single. The single debuted at number 40 on the US Billboard Hot 100; according to Tiffith, it sold 26,000 copies in its first week. The song was certified double platinum by the RIAA in 2018. Its music video, directed by Colin Tilley, was released on June 2, 2016. Between June 25 and July 11, 2016, a trilogy of three short films/music videos, directed by Begert and Free, were released for "By Any Means", "Tookie Knows II" and "Black Thoughts". According to Pitchfork's Jazz Monroe, the trilogy centered on "tense interactions with the cops before and after a pawn shop robbery". On the day of the album's release, the video trilogy was screened at the Downtown Independent Theater in Los Angeles over a 24-hour period, and a remix of "That Part", featuring new verses from Schoolboy Q's Black Hippy cohorts Lamar, Jay Rock, and Ab-Soul, was released. Following this, a music video for "John Muir", directed by APlusFilmz was released on July 21, 2016. "Overtime" was serviced to urban and rhythmic radio in North America, on September 12, 2016, as the album's third and final single; a music video for the song was released the same day.

On June 29, 2016, Schoolboy Q held a listening session for Blank Face LP in New York City, which was hosted by Hot 97 radio personality, Peter Rosenberg. During the session, Q confirmed that he would not be releasing a deluxe edition of the album. Various blogs reporting on the session said that Schoolboy Q had said that Interscope Records lobbied to have Miguel and Skye on "Overtime" in the hopes of recreating the success of "Studio", which he ultimately agreed to. Q said that his comments about "Overtime" had been misunderstood; in an interview with Real 92.3, Q clarified that TDE had suggested the song's inclusion instead of Interscope and criticized blogs for getting the information wrong, though he conceded that he "should've worded it way better". He also said he had apologized to Miguel. On June 30, he appeared on The Late Show with Stephen Colbert, where he performed a live rendition of "Groovy Tony" and "That Part". Schoolboy Q embarked on a twelve-show concert tour of North America, Groovy Tony Pit Stops, in support of Blank Face LP. The tour began in San Francisco on July 9, and concluded on July 17, in Houston. He then performed at the Panorama Music Festival in New York between July 22 to 24, 2016. From August 30 to December 15, 2016, SchoolBoy Q embarked on the Blank Face World Tour of North America, Oceania and Europe, taking Joey Badass as support. Midway through the tour, he appeared on Jimmy Kimmel Live! with E-40, performing "Dope Dealer" on September 14, 2016.

He is scheduled to embark on the 10 Years of Blank Face LP Tour in support of the album's 10th anniversary, beginning on October 1, 2026, in Atlanta and concluding on October 17, 2026, in Las Vegas.

== Commercial performance ==
Blank Face LP debuted at number two on the US Billboard 200, with 74,000 album-equivalent units with 52,000 copies coming from pure album sales in its first week. It was the highest selling album in its debut week. Blank Face LP is Schoolboy Q's second top five album on the Billboard 200, and follows his number one debuting Oxymoron effort in 2014 which sold 139,000 copies in its first week. In its second week, the album dropped to number 10 on the Billboard 200, earning 28,000 album-equivalent units that week. On June 8, 2018, the album was certified gold by the RIAA for combined sales and album-equivalent units of over 500,000 units in the United States.

== Critical reception ==
=== Contemporary reviews ===
Blank Face LP ratings
Aggregate scores
Source	Rating
AnyDecentMusic?	7.4/10
Metacritic	81/100
Review scores
Source	Rating
AllMusic	4/5 stars
Consequence	A−
Entertainment Weekly	B+
Exclaim!	7/10
Financial Times	4/5 stars
The Irish Times	4/5 stars
Pitchfork	8.3/10
Rolling Stone	3.5/5 stars
Spin	8/10
XXL	4/5

Blank Face LP received widespread critical acclaim. On review aggregator website Metacritic, the album holds a score of 81 out of 100, based on reviews from eighteen critics, indicating "universal acclaim". Aggregator AnyDecentMusic? gave it 7.4 out of 10, based on their assessment of the critical consensus.

David Jeffries of AllMusic said, "This sprawling, cumbersome, and often psychedelic effort feels like a glorious clearing house for the diverse and deep rapper, offering giant, cinematic, and challenging efforts." Michael Madden of Consequence said, "It's hard and sinister like a gangster rap album, but it's also sprawling and even psychedelic at times. Nothing else sounds like it, and that's a joy to behold." Eric Renner Brown of Entertainment Weekly said, "At 72 minutes, Blank Face does sometimes sag under its own ambition. ... But with an impressive range of sonic and lyrical styles and numerous highlights, Blank Face LP stands as one of 2016's most engaging rap projects." Writing for Exclaim! A. Harmony praised the album's "heterogeneous collection of styles". Jonah Bromwich of Pitchfork said, "Blank Face turns away from the ambitious fusion of To Pimp a Butterfly, instead doubling down on a smoked-out atmosphere that points the listener's focus toward rapping. That puts the onus on Q to hold attention for the duration of the record's hour-plus running time, and he does so." Keith Harris of Rolling Stone, praised the production and guest appearances, writing: "Digi+Phonics, Black Hippy's go-to production crew, handle most of the beats, which are plush with sumptuous, weed-hazy pleasures but steeped in a dank, justifiable paranoia. Nearly every element of the sound – the mean breakbeat from an old Christine McVie tune that Tae Beast loops beneath lead single "Groovy Tony", R&B visionary Anderson .Paak sweetening the mood without lightening it, guest rhymes from Kanye and Jadakiss and Vince Staples – adds an ominous undertone."

Kris Ex of Spin said, "It's not easy to homogenize the opposing forces at play, but everything here feels like a genuine rumble through a mind scarred and inebriated by the reality of gang life and chasing the American dream while the room spins." Chris Gibbons of XXL, concluded with: "Blank Face LP isn't Schoolboy Q's first great album, but it's the first one where he lives up to his utmost potential. He can be smooth, he can be hard as nails, but whatever he is, the MC does it with greatness. Q can talk about his violent, drug-dealing past and almost celebrate it in one moment and decry the ever-present dangers of hood life in the next. Blank Face is the album an artist like Schoolboy Q was born to make." In a mixed review, Sam C. Mac of Slant Magazine said, "Blank Face LP is ultimately an unfocused album, one caught between reportage and repugnant opportunism." In another mixed review, Jessica Ankomah of Now said, "Q might appear masked on the album cover, but his explicit tales of hardship, prosperity and loss hide nothing."

=== Retrospective reviews ===
Reflecting on the album a year after its release in 2017, Corbin Reiff of Uproxx called Blank Face LP SchoolBoy Q's best and "an indisputable classic", as well as the second-greatest TDE release behind To Pimp a Butterfly. In 2019, Highsnobiety ranked the album third on their list of the "25 Most Underrated Rap Releases of the 2010s". BrooklynVegan ranked the album at number 37 on their list of the "100 Best Rap and R&B Albums of the 2010s". In 2022, Rolling Stone ranked the album at number 164 on its list of "The 200 Greatest Hip Hop Albums of All Time", with writer Christopher R. Weingarten calling it a "contemporary gangsta rap classic". Similarly, Robert Blair of HotNewHipHop hailed the album as" ScHoolboy's ultimate gangsta rap symphony, and could easily stand alongside the best albums the sub-genre has ever produced", placing it first in a 2019 ranking of his studio albums. In 2024, Sam Moore of HipHopDX ranked the album as the fifth best TDE album, stating that it "remains a scorching, ominous and often psychedelic masterpiece.

In a 2019 interview with Vulture, Schoolboy Q expressed his dissatisfaction with the content of Blank Face LP, feeling that the album was too dark and introspective; "I want balance in my music. I'm not a guy that's just about to give you one sound. That's so boring and lame to me. That's my biggest regret with Blank Face. Besides a couple songs, I just made the whole album pretty dark." He also believed the album did not perform as well as Oxymoron because it was a "one-listen album". However, in March 2024, he ranked the album as his second-best, behind his recently released Blue Lips (2024). He said although he "didn't like it at first [because] ppl kinda told me da whole way this ain't it [sic]", he believed it was "one of the most creative gangsta rap albums ever" and said that its gold certification "felt better den [Oxymoron]'s Platinum [sic]." In July 2024, he selected "Groovy Tony", "Know Ya Wrong", "By Any Means", "John Muir" and "Tookie Knows II" as his favorite tracks from the album.

== Accolades ==
=== Rankings ===
Select rankings of Blank Face LP
Publication	List	Rank	Ref.
2DOPEBOYZ	Best Hip Hop Albums of 2016	4	
BrooklynVegan	100 Best Rap and R&B Albums of the 2010s	37	
Complex	The 50 Best Albums of 2016	9	
Consequence	Top 50 Albums of 2016	15	
Highsnobiety	The 25 Most Underrated Rap Releases of the 2010s	3	
Pitchfork	The 50 Best Albums of 2016	38	
Rolling Stone	The 200 Greatest Hip-Hop Albums of All Time	164	
Rough Trade	Albums of the Year	50	
Spin	The 50 Best Albums of 2016	26	
Stereogum	The 50 Best Albums of 2016	14	

=== Industry awards ===
Awards and nominations for Blank Face LP
Year	Ceremony	Category	Result	Ref.
2017	Grammy Awards	Best Rap Album	Nominated	

== Track listing ==
Blank Face LP track listing
No.	Title	Writer(s)	Producer(s)	Length
1.	"Torch"	Quincy Hanley; Nesbitt Wesonga, Jr.; Mario Loving; Mark Spears; Tony Russell	Nez & Rio	5:34
2.	"Lord Have Mercy"	Hanley; Kasseem Dean; Duke Pearson^{[c]}	Swizz Beatz	1:44
3.	"That Part" (featuring Kanye West)	Hanley; Ronald LaTour; Daveon Jackson; Kevin Gomringer; Tim Gomringer; Spears; Kanye West; Cydel Young; Noah Goldstein	Cardo; Yung Exclusive; Cubeatz; Sounwave^{[a]}	5:13
4.	"Groovy Tony / Eddie Kane" (featuring Jadakiss)	Hanley; Donte Perkins; Dwayne Abernathy, Jr.; Jason Phillips; Robert Townsend^{[d]}	Tae Beast; Dem Jointz	6:19
5.	"Kno Ya Wrong" (featuring Lance Skiiiwalker)	Hanley; Alan Maman; Jason "J. Lbs" Pounds; Lance Howard	The Alchemist; J. Lbs	5:25
6.	"Ride Out" (featuring Vince Staples)	Hanley; Spears; Vince Staples	Sounwave	4:47
7.	"Whateva U Want" (featuring Candice Pillay)	Hanley; Perkins; Candice Pillay	Tae Beast	3:50
8.	"By Any Means"	Hanley; LaTour; Jackson	Cardo; Yung Exclusive	3:34
9.	"Dope Dealer" (featuring E-40)	Hanley; Leland Wayne; Joshua Luellen; Earl Stevens; Norman Whitfield^{[e]}; Paul Beauregard^{[e]}; Jordan Houston^{[e]}; Patrick Houston^{[e]}	Metro Boomin; Southside	3:42
10.	"John Muir"	Hanley; Spears; William Hart^{[f]}; Dave Henderson^{[f]}; Tom Simon^{[f]}; Adrian Younge^{[f]}	Sounwave	3:39
11.	"Big Body" (featuring Tha Dogg Pound)	Hanley; Tyler Okonma; Delmar Arnaud; Ricardo Brown	Tyler, the Creator	3:43
12.	"Neva Change" (featuring SZA)	Hanley; Dacoury Natche; Larrance Dopson; Solána Rowe	DJ Dahi; Dopson	4:29
13.	"Str8 Ballin'"	Hanley; Wesonga, Jr.; Loving; Robert Bell^{[g]}; Ronald Bell^{[g]}; George Brown^{[g]}; Vince Edwards^{[g]}; Tyruss Himes^{[g]}; Johnny Jackson^{[g]}; Robert Mickens^{[g]}; Otha Nash^{[g]}; Tupac Shakur^{[g]}; Claydes Smith^{[g]}; Dennis Thomas^{[g]}; Richard Westfield^{[g]}; Jeff Barry^{[g]}; Ja'net Dubois^{[g]}	Nez & Rio; Sam Hook^{[b]}	4:09
14.	"Black Thoughts"	Hanley; William Brown; Mike Ratledge^{[h]}; George Clinton^{[h]}	Willie B.	3:42
15.	"Blank Face" (featuring Anderson .Paak)	Hanley; Spears; Russell	Sounwave; Russell	3:14
16.	"Overtime" (featuring Miguel and Justine Skye)	Hanley; LaTour; Jackson; Adam Feeney; Miguel Pimentel; Justine Skyers; Kendrick Duckworth; Charles Hinshaw	Cardo; Yung Exclusive; Frank Dukes	4:38
17.	"Tookie Knows II" (featuring Traffic and TF)	Hanley; Wesonga, Jr.; Loving; Derraile Cail; Mychal Hatch	Nez & Rio	4:45
Total length:				72:27

Notes

- ^{^[a]} signifies an additional producer
- ^{^[b]} signifies a vocal producer
- All songs are stylized with the capital letter "H" if they contain that letter in the title. For example, "That Part" is stylized as "THat Part".
- "Torch" features background vocals by Anderson .Paak
- "Lord Have Mercy" features background vocals by Swizz Beatz
- "Groovy Tony / Eddie Kane" features background vocals by Dem Jointz and additional vocals by Candice Pillay
- "By Any Means" features background vocals by Kendrick Lamar, and additional vocals by Candice Pillay and Terrace Martin
- "Dope Dealer" features additional vocals by Smacc
- "John Muir" features additional vocals by Sam Dew
- "Big Body" features additional vocals by Candice Pillay
- "Str8 Ballin'" features background vocals by Jesse Rankins
- "Black Thoughts" features intro vocals by Trayvon Ray Cail and additional vocals by Kendrick Lamar
- "Overtime" features additional vocals by Kendrick Lamar

Sample credits

- ^{^[c]} "Lord Have Mercy" contains elements from "Cristo Redentor", as performed by Donald Byrd and written by Duke Pearson.
- ^{^[d]} "Groovy Tony / Eddie Kane" contains re-spoken dialogue from the film The Five Heartbeats, written by Robert Townsend.
- "Kno Ya Wrong" contains uncredited samples from "Summer Madness", written by Robert Bell, Ronald Bell, George Brown, Robert Mickens, Otha Nash, Claydes Smith, Dennis Thomas and Richard Westfield.
- ^{^[e]} "Dope Dealer" contains samples from "Masterpiece", as performed by Grover Washington Jr. and written by Norman Whitfield; as well a sample from "Playa Hataz", as performed by Three 6 Mafia and written by Paul Beauregard, Jordan Houston and Patrick Houston.
- ^{^[f]} "John Muir" contains samples from "Silently", as performed by The Delfonics and Adrian Younge, and written by William Hart, Dave Henderson, Tom Simon and Adrian Younge.
- ^{^[g]} "Str8 Ballin'" contains an interpolation from "Picture Me Rollin'", written by Robert Bell, Ronald Bell, George Brown, Vince Edwards, Tyruss Himes, Johnny Jackson, Robert Mickens, Otha Nash, Tupac Shakur, Claydes Smith, Dennis Thomas and Richard Westfield; as well interpolations from "Movin' on Up", as performed by Ja'net Dubois and written by Jeff Barry and Ja'net Dubois.
- ^{^[h]} "Black Thoughts" contains a sample from "Drop", as performed by Soft Machine and written by Mike Ratledge; as well samples from "Good Old Music", as performed by Funkadelic and written by George Clinton.

== Personnel ==
Credits for Blank Face LP adapted from AllMusic.

- The Alchemist – producer
- Derek "MixedByAli" Ali – mixing
- Willie B. – producer
- Tae Beast – producer
- Mike Bozzi – mastering
- Trayvon Ray Cail – vocals
- Cardo – producer
- Cubeatz – producer
- Quentin Curtat – photography
- Dem Jointz – producer, background vocals
- Sam Dew – vocals
- DJ Dahi – producer
- Tha Dogg Pound – featured artist
- Larrance Dopson – producer
- E-40 – featured artist
- Yung Exclusive – producer
- Frank Dukes – producer
- Dave Free – associate producer, creative director
- Noah Goldstein – engineer
- Rob Gueringer – guitar
- Sam Hook – vocal producer
- James Hunt – engineer
- Jadakiss – featured artist
- Tom Khare – engineer
- Kendrick Lamar – vocals, background vocals
- Migui Maloles – engineer
- Terrace Martin – bass, horn, keyboards, saxophone, vocals, vocoder
- Metro Boomin – producer
- Miguel – featured artist
- Jaris Moses – bass, guitar
- Nez & Rio – producer
- Anderson .Paak – featured artist, background vocals
- Candice Pillay – featured artist, vocals
- Jason Pounds – producer
- Jesse Rankins – background vocals
- Tony Russell – producer
- Matt Schaeffer – mixing assistant
- Schoolboy Q – creative director, primary artist
- Vlad Sepetov – creative director
- Lance Skiiiwalker – featured artist
- Justine Skye – featured artist
- Sounwave – additional production, drums, keyboards, piano, producer
- Southside – producer
- Vince Staples – featured artist
- William Sullivan – assistant engineer
- Swizz Beatz – producer, background vocals
- SZA – featured artist
- TF – featured artist
- Anthony "Top Dawg" Tiffith – executive producer
- Traffic – featured artist
- Tyler, the Creator – producer
- Kanye West – featured artist
- Marlon Williams – guitar

== Charts ==
=== Weekly charts ===
Chart performance for Blank Face LP
Chart (2016)	Peak position
Australian Albums (ARIA)	9
Belgian Albums (Ultratop Flanders)	34
Belgian Albums (Ultratop Wallonia)	50
Canadian Albums (Billboard)	2
Danish Albums (Hitlisten)	32
Dutch Albums (Album Top 100)	35
Finnish Albums (Suomen virallinen lista)	36
French Albums (SNEP)	87
Irish Albums (IRMA)	29
German Albums (Offizielle Top 100)	73
New Zealand Albums (RMNZ)	5
Norwegian Albums (VG-lista)	11
Swedish Albums (Sverigetopplistan)	38
Swiss Albums (Schweizer Hitparade)	14
UK Albums (Official Charts)	36
UK R&B Albums (Official Charts)	5
US Billboard 200	2
US Top R&B/Hip-Hop Albums (Billboard)	1

=== Year-end charts ===
2016 year-end chart performance for Blank Face LP
Chart (2016)	Position
US Billboard 200	134
US Top R&B/Hip-Hop Albums (Billboard)	30

== Certifications ==
Certifications for Blank Face LP
Region	Certification	Certified units/sales
United States (RIAA)	Gold	500,000^{‡}
^{‡} Sales+streaming figures based on certification alone.
