= That Part =

Single by Schoolboy Q featuring Kanye West

from the album Blank Face LP
- Released: May 13, 2016
- Recorded: 2016
- Genre: Hip hop, trap
- Length: 4:38 (single version); 5:13 (album version)
- Label: TDE; Interscope
- Songwriters: Quincy Hanley; Kanye West; Ronald LaTour; Daveon Jackson; Kevin Gomringer; Tim Gomringer; Mark Spears
- Producers: Cardo; Yung Exclusive; Cubeatz; Sounwave

Schoolboy Q singles chronology
"Bitches N Marijuana" (2015)	"That Part" (2016)	"Overtime" (2016)

Kanye West singles chronology
"Figure It Out" (2016)	"That Part" (2016)	"Father Stretch My Hands" (2016)

Music video
- "That Part" on YouTube

"That Part" (stylized as "THat Part") is a hip hop song by American hip hop recording artist Schoolboy Q featuring Kanye West. It was released on May 13, 2016, by Top Dawg Entertainment (TDE) and Interscope Records, as the lead single from Schoolboy Q's fourth album Blank Face LP, and was produced by Cardo, Yung Exclusive, Cubeatz and Sounwave. The song was nominated for Best Rap Performance at the 59th Annual Grammy Awards. HipHopDX named it the ninth best hip-hop song of 2016.

== Accolades ==
German magazine Juice named it the fourth best international rap song of 2016. Pitchfork named the song as the 74th best song of 2016.

== Music video ==
The song's music video, directed by Colin Tilley, was released on June 2, 2016. As of August 2025, the music video has accumulated over 213 million views, making it his most viewed video on his Vevo channel.

== Live performances ==
In June 2016, Schoolboy Q performed a live rendition of "That Part", in a medley with "Groovy Tony", on The Late Show with Stephen Colbert.

== Black Hippy remix ==
"That Part" was later remixed, featuring new verses from Schoolboy Q and his Black Hippy cohorts Jay Rock, Kendrick Lamar and Ab-Soul, which was released on July 8, 2016. The remix was later released for purchase via digital distribution on July 16. It would also become the final official Black Hippy song recorded and/or released as the group disbanded in 2022 following Kendrick Lamar's departure from Top Dawg.

== Commercial performance ==
In the US, on the Billboard chart dated June 4, 2016, "That Part" made a debut at number 92 on the chart. The following week, the single completely fell off of the chart, however, on the chart dated July 2, the song re-entered at a new peak of number 76, due to the announcement and anticipation of his then-upcoming album Blank Face LP. In the following weeks, the song climbed up, eventually reaching a new peak of number 40 on the chart dating August 13, 2016, becoming his second top 40 hit as a lead artist and fourth overall, and his second highest position behind 2014's "Studio", which peaked at number 38, two years earlier. The record has thus charted for 13 weeks by far for the date ending September 17. In New Zealand, the single failed to crack the top 40, however, it peaked at number six on the Heatseekers chart, making it his first appearance as a lead artist in that country with the debut coming from the release and chart debut of his sophomore album with another song titled "By Any Means", also charting in the same chart at number eight.

After the song reached number 40 on the US Billboard Hot 100 chart, Kanye West surpassed Michael Jackson with his fortieth top 40 hit on the chart.

== Charts ==
=== Weekly charts ===
Chart (2016)	Peak position
Belgium Urban (Ultratop Flanders)	43
Canada Hot 100 (Billboard)	51
New Zealand Heatseekers (Recorded Music NZ)	6
US Billboard Hot 100	40
US Hot R&B/Hip-Hop Songs (Billboard)	13
US Rhythmic Airplay (Billboard)	25
US R&B/Hip-Hop Airplay (Billboard)	21

=== Year-end charts ===
Chart (2016)	Position
US Hot R&B/Hip-Hop Songs (Billboard)	45
US Hot Rap Songs (Billboard)	29

== Certifications ==
Region	Certification	Certified units/sales
New Zealand (RMNZ)	Platinum	30,000^{‡}
United States (RIAA)	2× Platinum	2,000,000^{‡}
^{‡} Sales+streaming figures based on certification alone.

== Release history ==
Region	Date	Format	Label	Ref.
United States	May 13, 2016	Digital download	Top Dawg; Interscope	
