= Compton (album) =

Studio album by Dr. Dre
- Released: August 7, 2015
- Studios: Dre's Crib; Record One (Los Angeles); Sony (Culver City, California)
- Genre: West Coast hip-hop
- Length: 61:40
- Labels: Aftermath; Interscope
- Producers: Dr. Dre (also exec.); Focus...; Dontae Winslow; DJ Dahi; Free School; Dem Jointz; Bink; DJ Khalil; Best Kept Secret; D.R.U.G.S Beats; Trevor Lawrence, Jr.; Cold 187um; Curt Chambers; Neff-U; Cardiak; DJ Premier; DJ Silk; Mista Choc

Dr. Dre chronology
2001 (1999)	Compton (2015)

Singles from Compton
- 1. "Talking to My Diary" Released: August 14, 2015

Compton is the third studio album by American rapper and producer Dr. Dre. It was released on August 7, 2015, on Apple Music and the iTunes Store, with the physical editions released on August 21, 2015. It is the follow-up to his second album, 2001 (1999), after the cancellation of the much talked about but never released Detox.

Production for the album took place with Detox, but the album itself was devised when production of the N.W.A biographical film Straight Outta Compton gave Dre the idea for a soundtrack, with album-specific production taking place in 2013–2015 at several recording studios and was handled by a variety of high-profile record producers, including Dr. Dre himself, Focus..., Dem Jointz, Trevor Lawrence, Jr., DJ Dahi, Cardiak and Theron Feemster, among others. Compton features guest appearances from Anderson .Paak, Marsha Ambrosius, Craig Owens, Ice Cube, King Mez, Justus, Kendrick Lamar, Candice Pillay, Jon Connor, Sly Pyper, Dem Jointz, The Game, Xzibit, Eminem, Snoop Dogg, and others.

The album debuted at number 2 on the US Billboard 200, selling 295,000 album-equivalent units in its first week. Upon its release, Compton received acclaim from music critics.

== Background ==
Following 11 years of unsuccessful work on his infamous Detox album, Dre canceled the project on August 1, 2015, during an episode of his Beats 1 radio show, The Pharmacy with Dr. Dre. He stated that the album did not meet his standards and had decided to scrap the project as a result. During the same episode, Dre announced that he would be releasing a brand-new album, entitled Compton, on August 7 on iTunes and Apple Music, with a physical release following on August 21. Earlier the same day in an interview with Power 99FM, Ice Cube had preemptively announced the album. The album was inspired by the N.W.A biographical film Straight Outta Compton and features a number of collaborators from various points in his career, including Eminem, Snoop Dogg, Kendrick Lamar, Xzibit, and The Game, among others.

"During principal photography of Straight Outta Compton, I felt myself going to the studio and being so inspired by the movie that I started recording an album," Dre said on his radio show. "I kept it under wraps, and now the album is finished. It's bananas. It's an 'inspired by' album. It's inspired by Straight Outta Compton. We're gonna call the album Compton: The Soundtrack. I'm really proud of this." Dre also described the upcoming release as being his 'grand finale.' This claim has turned out to be false and Dr. Dre hinted at a release of his upcoming fourth album.

== Release and reception ==
Professional ratings
Aggregate scores
Source	Rating
AnyDecentMusic?	7.8/10
Metacritic	82/100
Review scores
Source	Rating
AllMusic	4/5 stars
The A.V. Club	B+
The Daily Telegraph	4/5 stars
The Guardian	4/5 stars
The Independent	4/5 stars
NME	7/10
Pitchfork	8.8/10
Rolling Stone	4/5 stars
Spin	7/10
USA Today	3/4 stars

Compton was released by Aftermath Entertainment and Interscope Records on August 7, 2015, to widespread critical acclaim. At Metacritic, which assigns a normalized rating out of 100 to reviews from mainstream publications, it received an average score of 82, based on 36 reviews. Following two weeks of Apple exclusivity, the album was released for other streaming services as well as music stores on August 21. Rolling Stone critic Jonah Weiner deemed the album "by turns confounding and enthralling" while writing that it "contains some of his most ambitious, idea-stuffed production ever" and that "Dre's rhyming (aided as always by co-writers) is impressive". Robert Christgau from Vice was somewhat less enthusiastic, naming "Genocide" and "Animals" as highlights while writing that the record benefitted significantly from Dre's absence from half the songs because of so many guest artists. At the end of the year, Compton was named the 32nd best album of 2015 by Pitchfork, while The Guardian ranked it 35th.

== Commercial performance ==
Prior to its release, there was heavy anticipation on whether Compton or Luke Bryan's Kill the Lights would debut at the top of the US Billboard 200 chart. Ultimately, Compton debuted at number 2 with 295,000 equivalent album units; it sold 278,558 copies in its first week, with the remainder of its unit total reflecting the album's streaming activity and track sales. Compton is Dr. Dre's third solo album to debut at number one on the Billboard's Top R&B/Hip-Hop Albums. The album remained in the chart's top ten for the next several weeks, and, as of June 2016, the album has sold over 600,000 copies in the United States. Compton has been certified Gold by the Recording Industry Association of America (RIAA).

Compton debuted at number one on the UK Albums Chart after selling 45,721 copies (including 2,079 streaming sales), becoming Dr. Dre's first number-one album in the UK. It outsold its nearest competitor, Frank Turner's Positive Songs for Negative People, by over 28,000 combined chart sales. Additionally, as the physical version of the album was not released until two weeks later, Dr. Dre became the first artist in history to top the UK Albums Chart with a non-physical release. Compton has been certified Gold by the British Phonographic Industry (BPI).

In 2015, Compton was ranked as the 45th most popular album of the year on the Billboard 200.

== Track listing ==
No.	Title	Writer(s)	Producer(s)	Length
1.	"Intro"	Andre Young; Bernard Edwards, Jr.; Dontae Winslow	Focus...; Dr. Dre; Winslow	1:15
2.	"Talk About It" (featuring King Mez and Justus)	Young; Morris Ricks II; Justin "Justus" Mohrle; Dacoury Natche; Michael McHenry; Jean Kouame-Baptiste; Ryan Buendia; Kyle Edwards	DJ Dahi; Kouame-Baptiste	3:15
3.	"Genocide" (featuring Kendrick Lamar, Marsha Ambrosius, and Candice Pillay)	Young; Kendrick Duckworth; Marsha Ambrosius; Sly Jordan; Candice Pillay; Dwayne Abernathy, Jr.; Charlie Wilson; Lonnie Simmons; Rudy Taylor	Dem Jointz	4:26
4.	"It's All on Me" (featuring Justus and BJ the Chicago Kid)	Young; Mohrle; Roosevelt Harrell III; Bryan Sledge	Bink; Dr. Dre	3:47
5.	"All in a Day's Work" (featuring Anderson .Paak and Marsha Ambrosius)	Young; Brandon Anderson; Ambrosius; Khalil Abdul-Rahman; Natche; Daniel Tannenbaum	DJ Khalil; DJ Dahi	5:13
6.	"Darkside / Gone" (featuring King Mez, Marsha Ambrosius, and Kendrick Lamar)	Young; Ricks II; Tyheim Cannon; Craig Balmoris; Julian Nixon; Duckworth; Ambrosius; Paul McCartney; Linda McCartney; Denny Laine; Jimmy McCulloch; Joe English; Geoff Britton	"Darkside" produced by Best Kept Secret and Dr. Dre; "Gone" produced by D.R.U.G.S. Beats and Dr. Dre	3:53
7.	"Loose Cannons" (featuring Xzibit, Cold 187um, and Sly Pyper)	Young; Alvin Joiner; Jordan; Edwards, Jr; Trevor Lawrence, Jr.; Gregory Hutchinson	Focus...; Lawrence, Jr.; Dr. Dre; Cold 187um	4:13
8.	"Issues" (featuring Ice Cube, Anderson .Paak, and Dem Jointz)	Young; Abernathy, Jr.; Anderson; Edwards, Jr.; Lawrence, Jr.; Curtis Chambers; Theron Feemster; O'Shea Jackson, Sr.; Selda Bağcan	Focus...; Chambers; Lawrence, Jr.; Neff-U; Dr. Dre	3:41
9.	"Deep Water" (featuring Kendrick Lamar, Justus, and Anderson .Paak)	Young; Duckworth; Mohrle; Anderson; Edwards, Jr.; Carl McCormick; Natche; Abernathy, Jr.	Focus...; Cardiak; DJ Dahi; Dem Jointz; Dr. Dre	5:11
10.	"One Shot One Kill" (performed by Jon Connor featuring Snoop Dogg)	Young; Jon Freeman, Jr.; Pillay; Edwards, Jr.; Lawrence, Jr.; Calvin Broadus, Jr.; Luca Cavina; Tommaso Colliva; Enrico Gabrielli; Massimo Martellotta; Fabio Rondanini	Focus...; Lawrence, Jr.; Dr. Dre	3:25
11.	"Just Another Day" (performed by The Game featuring Asia Bryant)	Young; Jayceon Taylor; Asia Bryant; Stanley Benton; Lawrence, Jr.; Feemster; Thepporn Petchubon	Lawrence, Jr.; Feemster	2:21
12.	"For the Love of Money" (featuring Jill Scott, Jon Connor, and Anderson .Paak)	Young; Freeman, Jr.; Anderson; McCormick; Jill Scott; Anthony Henderson; Bryon McCane; Charles Scruggs; Stanley Howse; Steven Howse; Eric Wright	Cardiak	4:08
13.	"Satisfiction" (featuring Snoop Dogg, Marsha Ambrosius, and King Mez)	Young; Ricks II; Ambrosius; Abernathy, Jr.; Broadus, Jr.	Dem Jointz	4:24
14.	"Animals" (featuring Anderson .Paak)	Young; Anderson; Jordan; Christopher Martin	DJ Premier; BMB SpaceKid	3:47
15.	"Medicine Man" (featuring Eminem, Candice Pillay, and Anderson .Paak)	Young; Marshall Mathers; Pillay; Anderson; Abernathy, Jr.; Edwards, Jr.; Chambers	Dem Jointz; Focus...	4:14
16.	"Talking to My Diary"	Young; Russell Brown; Anthony Johnson; Mario Johnson	DJ Silk; Mista Choc; Dr. Dre	4:23
Total length:				61:40

The album was mastered by Brian 'Big Bass' Gardner at the Bernie Grundman Mastering in Los Angeles, California.

Notes

- "Intro" features additional vocals by Candice Pillay and Dem Jointz.
- "Talk About It" features additional vocals by Sly Jordan and Marsha Ambrosius.
- "Genocide" features additional vocals by King Mez, Dem Jointz, Candice Pillay, and Sly Jordan.
- "It's All on Me" features additional vocals by Sly Jordan and King Mez.
- "All in a Day's Work" features additional vocals by King Mez, Sly Jordan, Danny Tannenbaum, and Jimmy Iovine.
- "Darkside" features additional vocals by Sly Jordan.
- "Gone" features additional vocals by Sly Jordan.
- "Loose Cannons" features additional vocals by King Mez, Marsha Ambrosius, Anderson .Paak, and Joslynn Brown.
- "Issues" features additional vocals by Snoop Dogg, King Mez, Xzibit, Dem Jointz, Candice Pillay, and Joslynn Brown.
- "Deep Water" features additional vocals by Wyann Vaughn, King Mez, Cheynne Surratt, The Game, and Joslynn Brown.
- "One Shot One Kill" features additional vocals by Dr. Dre, Dem Jointz, Anderson .Paak, Craig Owens, and Candice Pillay.
- "Just Another Day" features additional vocals by Wyann Vaughn.
- "For the Love of Money" features additional vocals by Lia Mack.
- "Animals" features additional vocals by DJ Premier and Eric "Blu2th" Griggs.
- "Medicine Man" features additional vocals by Sly Jordan.
- "Talking to My Diary" features additional vocals by Slim the Mobster, Anderson .Paak, Sly Jordan, Theron Feemster, and Focus….

Sample credits

- "Intro" contains narration from the television program, Compton Black City, provided by T3 Media and CBS News.
- "Genocide" contains a sample of "Burn Rubber On Me (Why You Wanna Hurt Me)", written by Charlie Wilson, Lonnie Simmons, and Rudy Taylor, as performed by The Gap Band.
- "It's All on Me" contains a sample of "The Lord Will Make a Way" as performed by the S.C.I. Youth Choir.
- "Darkside" contains excerpts of Eazy E from Julio G's Westside Radio.
- "Gone" contains a sample of "Spirits of Ancient Egypt", written by Paul McCartney, Linda McCartney, Denny Laine, Jimmy McCulloch, Joe English, and Geoff Britton, as performed by Wings.
- "Loose Cannons" contains a sample of "Underground Session" arranged and performed by Janko Nilovic.
- "Issues" contains a sample of "İnce İnce Bir Kar Yağar", originally written by Aşık Mahzuni Şerif, as performed by Selda Bağcan.
- "One Shot One Kill" contains elements of "Ogni Riferimento A Fatti Accaduti E' Puramente Casuale", written by Luca Cavina, Tommaso Colliva, Enrico Gabrielli, Massimo Martellotta, and Fabio Rondanini, as performed by Calibro 35
- "Just Another Day" contains a sample of "Fang Jai Viangjan", written and performed by Thepporn Petchubon.
- "For the Love of Money" contains a sample of "Foe tha Love of $", written by Anthony Henderson, Bryon McCane, Charles Scruggs, Stanley Howse, Steven Howse, and Eric Wright, as performed by Bone Thugs-n-Harmony featuring Eazy-E; as well as elements of "Vendesi Saggezza E Cervello Di Seconda Mano" (Alberto Gaviglio-Michele Conta) arranged and performed by La Locanda delle Fate, taken from the album, "Forse le lucciole non si amano più" (1977 Polydor).

== Charts ==
=== Weekly charts ===
Chart (2015)	Peak position
Australian Albums (ARIA)	2
Austrian Albums (Ö3 Austria)	3
Belgian Albums (Ultratop Flanders)	1
Belgian Albums (Ultratop Wallonia)	5
Canadian Albums (Billboard)	1
Danish Albums (Hitlisten)	2
Dutch Albums (Album Top 100)	1
Finnish Albums (Suomen virallinen lista)	3
French Albums (SNEP)	1
German Albums (Offizielle Top 100)	4
Greek Albums (IFPI)	45
Hungarian Albums (MAHASZ)	5
Irish Albums (IRMA)	1
Italian Albums (FIMI)	14
New Zealand Albums (RMNZ)	1
Norwegian Albums (VG-lista)	25
Portuguese Albums (AFP)	29
Swiss Albums (Schweizer Hitparade)	1
Scottish Albums (Official Charts)	1
UK Albums (Official Charts)	1
UK Album Downloads (Official Charts)	1
UK R&B Albums (Official Charts)	1
US Billboard 200	2
US Top R&B/Hip-Hop Albums (Billboard)	1

=== Year-end charts ===
Chart (2015)	Position
Australian Albums (ARIA)	21
Belgian Albums (Ultratop Flanders)	31
Belgian Albums (Ultratop Wallonia)	200
Canadian Albums (Billboard)	16
Dutch Albums (Album Top 100)	46
French Albums (SNEP)	91
New Zealand Albums (RMNZ)	42
Swiss Albums (Schweizer Hitparade)	76
UK Albums (OCC)	54
US Billboard 200	45
US Digital Albums (Billboard)	13
US Top R&B/Hip-Hop Albums (Billboard)	8
US Rap Albums (Billboard)	7

Chart (2016)	Position
Belgian Albums (Ultratop Flanders)	179
US Top R&B/Hip-Hop Albums (Billboard)	53

== Certifications ==
Region	Certification	Certified units/sales
Australia (ARIA)	Gold	35,000^{^}
France (SNEP)	Gold	50,000^{*}
United Kingdom (BPI)	Gold	100,000^{*}
United States (RIAA)	Gold	500,000^{^}
^{*} Sales figures based on certification alone.^{^} Shipments figures based on certification alone.

== Release history ==
Region	Date	Format	Label
Worldwide	August 7, 2015.	Digital download	Aftermath; Interscope; Polydor; Universal
Worldwide	August 21, 2015	CD	Aftermath; Interscope; Polydor; Universal
Worldwide	November 20, 2015	Vinyl	Aftermath; Interscope; Polydor; Universal

== See also ==
- List of number-one albums of 2015 (Australia)
- List of number-one albums from the 2010s (New Zealand)
- List of UK Albums Chart number ones of the 2010s
- List of UK R&B Chart number-one albums of 2015
- List of Billboard number-one R&B/Hip-Hop albums of 2015
