= Medicine Man (song) =

Song by Dr. Dre featuring Eminem, Candice Pillay and Anderson .Paak

from the album Compton
- Released: August 7, 2015
- Recorded: 2010–2015
- Studio: Record One, Los Angeles; Effigy, Detroit
- Genre: Hip hop
- Length: 4:14
- Label: Aftermath; Interscope
- Songwriter(s): Andre Young; Marshall Mathers; Candice Pillay; Brandon Anderson; Justin Mohrle; Morris Ricks II; Dwayne Abernathy Jr.; Bernard Edwards Jr.; Curtis Chambers
- Producer(s): Dem Jointz; Focus...

"Medicine Man" is a song by American rapper-producer Dr. Dre from his third studio album Compton. It was released as the album's fifteenth track on August 7, 2015 via Aftermath/Interscope Records along with the rest of the album. Recording sessions took place at Record One in Sherman Oaks and at Effigy Studios in Michigan. Produced by Dem Jointz and Focus..., the song features vocals from American rapper Eminem, South African singer Candice Pillay, and American recording artist Anderson .Paak, with additional vocals from Sly Jordan.

Despite never being released as a single, the song has managed to reach number 121 in French and the US chart, as well as number 40 on the Billboard Hot R&B/Hip-Hop Songs.

== Composition ==
The song begins with a skit performed by Anderson .Paak and Dr. Dre. Candice Pillay performs the intro to the song, as well as the hook. Dr. Dre performs the first verse. Anderson .Paak performs the bridge. Eminem raps the second verse and also screams "Fuck!" at the end of the song.

In Eminem's verse, the word rape is censored when he raps, "I even make the bitches I [rape] cum."

== Live performances ==
Along with "Chloraseptic" remix and "Framed", the song made its live debut at Eminem's Coachella performance on April 15, 2018. The song was placed on most setlists for Em's the Revival Tour.

== Reception ==
In his album review for Compton, Del F. Cowie of Exclaim! called Eminem's verse, as well as Snoop Dogg, Ice Cube, The Game and Xzibit's contributions to the project, one of his "best performances in recent memory".

== Controversy ==
The song received controversy over Eminem's line, "I even make the bitches I rape cum". Karen Ingala Smith, chief executive of the London-based charity Nia Project, said, “Women and girls who have suffered sexual violence often blame themselves or question whether they were really raped. Peddling the lie that orgasm equals consent silences victims of sexual violence”.

== Charts ==
Chart (2015)	Peak position
France (SNEP)	121
US Bubbling Under Hot 100 Singles (Billboard)	21
US Hot R&B/Hip-Hop Songs (Billboard)	40
US R&B/Hip-Hop Digital Song Sales (Billboard)	18
US Rap Digital Song Sales (Billboard)	14
