= Candice Pillay =

- Born: Candice Pillay; June 10, 1981 (age 45); Pietermaritzburg, South Africa
- Genres: Pop, R&B
- Occupation: Singer-songwriter
- Instrument: Vocals
- Website: www.candicepillay.com

Candice Pillay (born June 10, 1981) is a South African singer-songwriter based in Los Angeles. She is best known for writing songs for artists including Rihanna, Kendrick Lamar, Calvin Harris, Christina Aguilera, Dr. Dre, Eminem, ScHoolboy Q, Why Don't We, Rita Ora, Sevyn Streeter, Logan Paul and Tinie Tempah.

== Career ==
Pillay was born and raised in Pietermaritzburg, South Africa in an Indian family. She released her first mixtape in December 2014. The mixtape, titled The Mood Kill, is a 15-song compilation written by Pillay and collaborators such as Alex da Kid and Dem Jointz. In August 2015, Pillay's vocals were featured on two songs from Dr. Dre's album "Compton"; "Medicine Man" (ft. Eminem and Anderson .Paak). In an interview with MTV, Pillay spoke about working with Dr. Dre stating, "He really made an impression on me from the moment I met him. Of course, he's a legendary guy. We all look up to him. You never know what to expect when you meet someone of his caliber. But, from the first meeting, he was one of the most humble guys I've met."

In 2015, Pillay co-wrote Rihanna's American Oxygen in a collaborative effort with Alex Da Kid and her KIDinaKORNER label-mates X Ambassadors. Pillay told reporters the song hit close to home for herself, Alex Da Kid and Rihanna who all moved to America to further their careers in the music industry. In September 2020, Pillay released Stand Silent ft. Jon Connor in the midst of protests following the murder of George Floyd. In April 2021, Pillay announced her upcoming EP, The Rise.

=== Influences ===
In an interview with Toronto Paradise, Pillay spoke about her musical influences. "I have African and Indian heritage, and mixing the African and Indian rhythms and drums together is very close to RnB and hip hop," she said. "A lot of my melodies are very Indian and you wouldn't think that because they're under a heavy 808, but I try to access all those cultures that I grew up on."

== Discography ==
=== Singles ===
==== As a featured artist ====
Title	Year	Artist	Album	Notes
"Bang Ya Head Harder" (ft. Lloyd Banks, Dr. Dre & Candice Pillay)	2010	50 Cent	The Reconstruction Mixtape	
"Don't Sell Out" (ft. Candice Pillay)	2013	Tinie Tempah	Demonstration	
"Witch Doctor" (ft. Candice Pillay)	2013	Tinie Tempah	Demonstration	
"We Receive You" (ft. Carnage & Candice Pillay)	2014	Morgan Page	DC To Light	
"Genocide" (ft. Kendrick Lamar, Marsha Ambrosius & Candice Pillay)	2015	Dr. Dre	Compton	
"Medicine Man" (ft. Eminem, Candice Pillay & Anderson .Paak)	2015	Dr. Dre	Compton	#40 US R&B
"WHateva U Want" (ft. Candice Pillay)	2016	Schoolboy Q	Blank Face LP	
"F-VR" (ft. Candice Pillay & No Riddim)	2016	Far East Movement	Identity	

==== As lead artist ====
Title	Year	Artist	Album
"Bombz Away"	2009	Candice Pillay	-
"Loveless"	2010	Candice Pillay	-
"Stand Silent feat. Jon Connor"	2020	Candice Pillay	-
"Hotel Avenir (Saw It Coming)"	2021	Candice Pillay	The Rise EP
"Honey Boy"	2021	Candice Pillay	The Rise EP
"Song Of Solomon"	2021	Candice Pillay	The Rise EP
"Saint Tropez"	2021	Candice Pillay	The Rise EP

==== As a songwriter ====
Song	Artist	Writer (s)	Album	Year
"Lotus"	Christina Aguilera	Christina Aguilera, Candice Pillay, Alexander Grant, Dem Jointz Anthony Gonzalez, Morgan Kibby, Justin Meldal-Johnsen	Lotus	2012
"Make The World Move" (ft. Cee Lo Green)	Christina Aguilera	Alexander Grant, Mike Del Rio, Candice Pillay, Jayson DeZuzio, Dwayne Abernathy, Armando Trovajoli, Thomas DeCarlo Callaway	Lotus	2012
"Cease Fire"	Christina Aguilera	Christina Aguilera, Candice Pillay, Alexander Grant	Lotus	2012
"Circles"	Christina Aguilera	Christina Aguilera, Candice Pillay, Alexander Grant, Dwayne Abernathy	Lotus	2012
"Best of Me"	Christina Aguilera	Candice Pillay, Alexander Grant, Dwayne Abernathy, Mike del Rio, Nate Campany	Lotus	2012
"Shut Up"	Christina Aguilera	Christina Aguilera, Candice Pillay, Alexander Grant, Dwayne Abernathy, Jayson DeZuzio	Lotus	2012
"Light Up the Sky"	Christina Aguilera	Christina Aguilera, Candice Pillay, Alexander Grant	Lotus	2012
"Cockiness (Love It)"	Rihanna	Candice Pillay, Robyn Fenty, D. Abernathy, Shondrae Crawford	Talk That Talk	2011
"Don't Sell Out" (ft. Candice Pillay)	Tinie Tempah	Okogwu, Ryan Nile Sutherland, Andrew Stewart-Jones, Candice Pillay, Dwayne Abernathy, Vaali, S. S. Thaman	Demonstration	2013
"Witch Doctor" (ft. Candice Pillay)	Tinie Tempah	Okogwu, Candice Pillay, Alexander Grant, Abernathy	Demonstration	2013
"Consistent"	Sevyn Streeter	Sevyn Streeter, Candice Pillay, Dem Jointz, Justin Robinson, Askia Fountain	Shoulda Been There Part 1	2015
"American Oxygen"	Rihanna	Alexander Grant, Sam Harris, Candice Pillay, Robyn Fenty	-	2015
"Genocide" (ft. Kendrick Lamar, Marsha Ambrosius & Candice Pillay)	Dr. Dre	Candice Pillay, Young, Kendrick Duckworth, Ricks II, Marsha Ambrosius, Sly Jordan, Dwayne "Dem Jointz" Abernathy, Jr.	Compton	2015
"One Shot One Kill" (performed by Jon Connor ft. Snoop Dogg)	Dr. Dre	Young, Jon Freeman Jr, Candice Pillay, Edwards Jr, Lawrence Jr.	Compton	2015
"Medicine Man" (ft. Eminem, Candice Pillay & Anderson .Paak)	Dr. Dre	Candice Pillay, Young, Marshall Mathers, Mohrle, Anderson, Ricks II, Abernathy Jr, Edwards Jr, C. Chambers	Compton	2015
"White Lightning", Candice Pillay & Anderson .Paak)	Dr. Dre	Candice Pillay, Young, Marshall Mathers, Mohrle, Anderson, Ricks II, Abernathy Jr, Edwards Jr, C. Chambers	Compton	2015
"Medicine Man" (ft. Eminem, Candice Pillay & Anderson .Paak)	Dr. Dre	Candice Pillay, Young, Marshall Mathers, Mohrle, Anderson, Ricks II, Abernathy Jr, Edwards Jr, C. Chambers	Compton	2015
"Blank Face" (ft. Anderson .Paak)	Schoolboy Q	Candice Pillay, Quincy Hanley, Tony Russell, Sounwave	Blank Face LP	2016
"Cash Out" (ft. ScHoolboy Q, PARTYNEXTDOOR, Shelley FKA DRAM & Funk Wav)	Calvin Harris	Brittany Hazzard, PARTYNEXTDOOR, Roget Chahayed, Adam Wiles, Quincey Hanley, Shelley Massenburg-Smith, Candice Pillay	Funk Wav Bounces Vol. 1	2017
"Help Me Help You" (ft. Why Don't We)	Logan Paul	Candice Pillay, Troy "R8dio" Johnson	Help Me Help You" (ft. Why Don't We) - Single	2017
