= American Oxygen =

Single by Rihanna
- Released: April 14, 2015
- Recorded: 2014
- Genre: Dubstep; EDM
- Length: 5:20
- Label: Roc Nation; Westbury Road
- Songwriters: Alexander Grant; Candice Pillay; Sam Harris; Robyn Fenty
- Producers: Alex da Kid; Kanye West

Rihanna singles chronology
| "Bitch Better Have My Money" (2015) | "American Oxygen" (2015) | "Work" (2016) |

Music video
- "American Oxygen" on YouTube

"American Oxygen" is a song recorded by the Barbadian singer Rihanna. It was written by Alex da Kid, Candice Pillay, Sam Harris and Rihanna; Alex da Kid and Kanye West produced it. Written over the course of a year, "American Oxygen" was inspired by the 1984 single "Born in the U.S.A." performed by Bruce Springsteen. It was made available for streaming on Tidal on April 5, 2015, and released for digital download on April 14 via the iTunes Store as a standalone single. The song has patriotic lyrical content about a new America and the chasing of the American dream.

The song received mostly positive reviews from music critics, who generally praised the intricacy of the production, the quality of the lyrical content and the dubstep-inspired aesthetic of the song. Darren Craig, Jonathan Craven and Jeff Nicholas of the Uprising Creative directed the music video for "American Oxygen", which premiered exclusively on Tidal on April 6. It depicts numerous moments from American history while Rihanna sings in front of a large American flag. Rihanna performed "American Oxygen" for the first time at the Final Four of the 2015 NCAA Men's Division I Basketball Tournament in Indianapolis.

== Writing and production ==
She [Rihanna] just really made magic with that song and she made it her own. And the fact that her and Alex both helped craft the song and turned it into something that's bigger than me, it just means way more. The perspective that they gave to it, having it be this immigrant story, is something so cool and unique that I probably wouldn't have thought of had it not been for them.

— Sam Harris talking to Billboard about "American Oxygen"

"American Oxygen" was written by Alex da Kid, Sam Harris, Candice Pillay and Rihanna. The production was done by Alex da Kid and the American rapper Kanye West. The writing of the song began in 2014, and it continued over a course of one year. Originally, Alex da Kid sent the beats of the song to Harris who started writing some lyrics. In an interview with Billboard, Harris noted how "American Oxygen" really stuck with him and he started the chorus with a couple lines he wrote: "We worked on just that chorus for like three or four months, going back and forth, back and forth.... It goes to show you that sometimes these songs just appear out of nowhere and sometimes you just have to go at it like a block of marble and you're chipping away at it." Harris explained how he and Alex da Kid wanted the chorus of the song to say a lot, even with a very small amount of lyrics in it. When they got the final chorus, the producer started to look for potential performers of the song.

When the song came across Rihanna, she and Alex da Kid began to adjust the song. The singer and the producer co-wrote the verses together with Harris, "I wrote one thing and then Alex and Rihanna had the idea to turn it into this song about an immigrant story, coming to this country as an outsider... That was her idea, really, hers and Alex's, to turn it into that kind of song." Harris stated that the inspiration for starting to write "American Oxygen" was the 1984 single "Born in the U.S.A." by Bruce Springsteen. According to Harris, "He [Springsteen] gets that there's pride to living here in this country. This country is great and has the potential to be something really, really incredible, but there are a lot of problems that we don't acknowledge and it's important to shed light on both those things. And if you can do that in a song, that's the best." He also told the publication that they have their own version of "American Oxygen" too, however, according to him it means much more to be sung by Rihanna because she is a black female immigrant in the United States, "That is so powerful for a young kid to see her singing that song, it gets me choked up just thinking about it. It really was made so much more powerful by what she contributed to the songwriting and the performance of the song. I idolize her, and to have been given the opportunity to work with her is amazing."

== Release ==
"American Oxygen" was first featured on commercials which promoted the 2015 NCAA Men's Division I Basketball Tournament. Later, the song was made available for streaming on April 5, 2015, via Tidal, a service co-owned by Rihanna together with other music artists including, Jay Z, Beyoncé and Madonna. On April 14, "American Oxygen" was made available for digital download worldwide via the iTunes Store. In Canada and the United States it was released two days later, on April 16. It was sent to Hot/Modern/AC radio in the United States on April 20, and impacted the contemporary hit radio stations in the country a day after, on April 21.

== Composition and lyrical interpretation ==
"American Oxygen"
A 26-second sample of "American Oxygen", featuring "EDM-inspired beats" and lyrics about the American dream, living in the new American society.

"American Oxygen" is a sentimental ballad with a length of five minutes and twenty seconds. According to Jim Farber of New York Daily News, it features a "deeply resonant production" accompanied by EDM-inspired beats. Jessica Goodman of The Huffington Post described it as a "slowed-down, dubstep-influenced track" in which she calls out a "new America." According to Ariana Bacle of Entertainment Weekly, "American Oxygen" is "a slower, soulful take on living in America." Dee Lockett of Vulture described it as a "sobering ode to the American dream". Lyrically, the song interprets an immigrant story which could be seen in the lyrics:

Oh say can you see? This is the American dream
Young girl hustlin'
On the other side of the ocean.
You can be anything at all
In America, America.
I say, if you can't see,
Just close your eyes and breathe.

Farber compared the lyrical content of the song to that of the 2009 single "Empire State of Mind" by Jay Z and Alicia Keys. According to Farber, "American Oxygen" "offers an un-ironic endorsement of the American dream, saluting unending possibility and upward mobility" and features Rihanna proudly singing the lines, "We sweat for a nickel and a dime, turn it into an empire." According to Jake Flanagin of Quartz, the song is autobiographical to Rihanna and describes her move to the United States in late 2003, when record producer Evan Rogers discovered her in Barbados. VH1's Alexa Tietjen wrote that "American Oxygen" is similar to a presidential speech and "portrays a hurtful past while fostering hope for the future". According to Erika Ramirez of Billboard, the lyrics of the song describe "pursuit and resilience." CBS Radio's reviewer thought that the final line in the song, "This is the new America" can be deemed as the "most telling".

== Critical reception ==
Vulture's Lockett wrote "But just in case the song doesn't wind up replacing our national anthem, it'd also make for the perfect Empire theme song." Tietjen of VH1 described "American Oxygen" as different for 180 degrees from her previous single, "Bitch Better Have My Money", and not as raw as "FourFiveSeconds". Ailbhe Mahone of the Irish Times declared the single as 'Track of the Week' and called it "epic". She also wrote, "When she sings the line ‘we are the new America’, we defy you not to feel a shiver down your spine."

Rob Le Donne of The Guardian wrote that the single features more "serious" Rihanna than the persona on her previous singles, "it's hard to tell exactly what Rihanna is trying to say – but maybe that’s the point." Further more, he praised the producers Alex da Kid and West and the "layered" production that they have done on the song. However, he thought that "American Oxygen" is not "radio-friendly" unlike Eminem and Rihanna's 2010 single "Love the Way You Lie", which was also produced by Alex da Kid, or Rihanna's songs from her previous album, Unapologetic, including "Diamonds" and "Pour It Up". Le Donne wrote "So why is Rihanna, arguable queen of the club jam, putting out such a heavy single when she could have released another party banger?" To answer his question he put out two theories, on the first one, he thought that putting out the song is a "calculated move driven to get people talking about her again" because she has been musically inactive for three years, or the second theory that "Rihanna wants to move past her commercial dance tracks and actually comment on today's society".

== Commercial performance ==
"American Oxygen" debuted at number 91 on the US Billboard Hot 100 chart for the issue dated May 2, 2015. For the week, it sold over 20,000 digital copies and was streamed 2.1 million times. It peaked at number 78 on its second week on the chart and charted for four weeks total.

== Music video ==
=== Development and synopsis ===
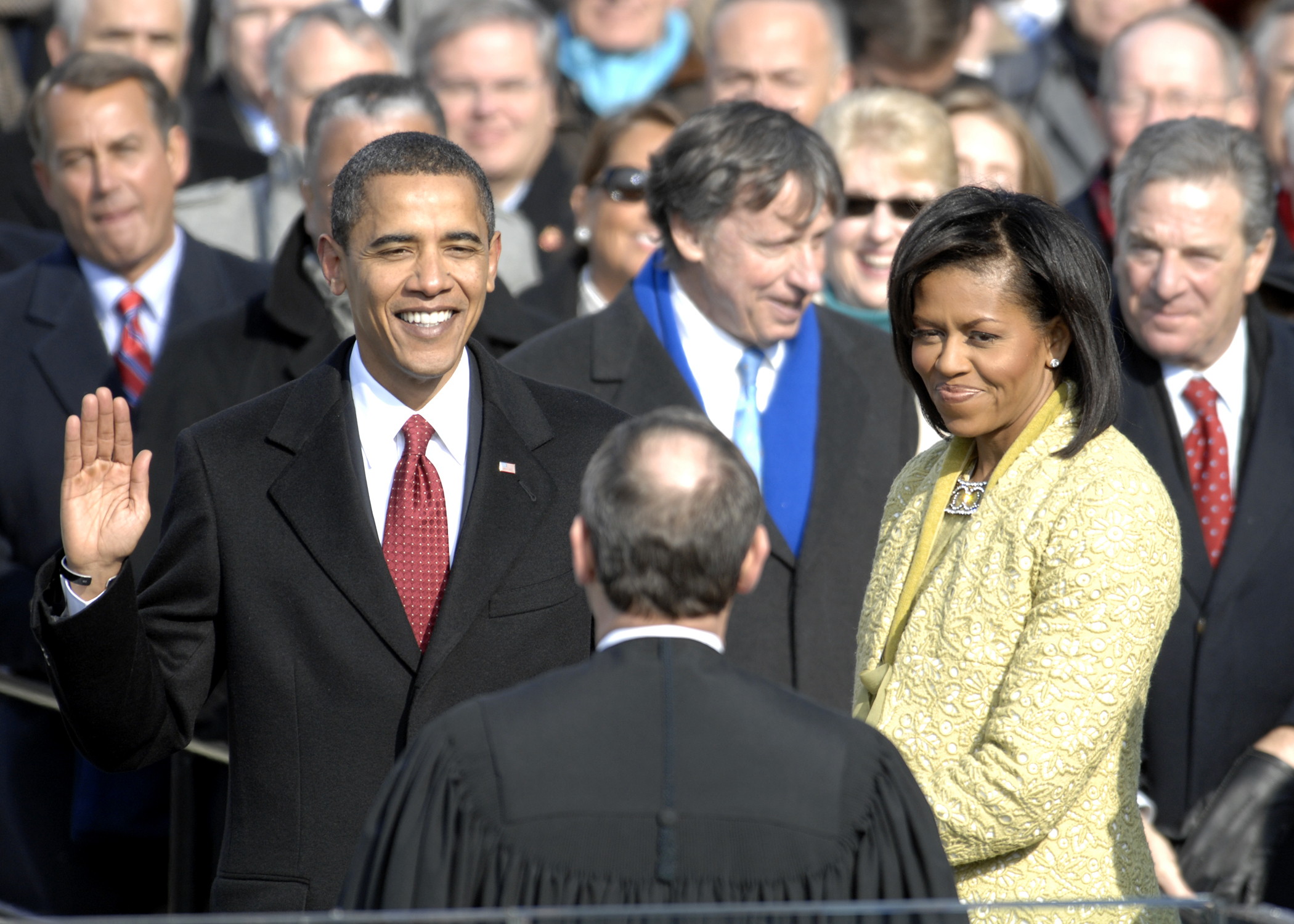
Numerous important moments in American history are shown throughout the video including the inauguration of the first ever black president, Barack Obama

The music video for "American Oxygen" was directed by Darren Craig, Jonathan Craven and Jeff Nicholas of the Uprising Creative. The trio had previously collaborated with Rihanna on the video for her 2013 single, "What Now". Nathan Scherrer served as a producer of the visual, while Isaac Bauman was the director of photography. Clark Eddy of Snipomatic was the editor of the video, while Ben Piety helped the line producing. Brandon Mendez served as a production designer, Mel Ottenberg designed Rihanna's outfits, while Trevor Durtschi and Ntropic did the coloring. It premiered on April 6 exclusively on Tidal. On April 16 it was uploaded on Rihanna's official Vevo account on YouTube. Subsequently, Rihanna posted on her official Twitter account, "one of the most important music videos I have made to date". The same day, it was made available for digital download on the iTunes Store.

The video begins with Rihanna standing on the stairs of a building on which wall is a big American flag. During the moment, shadows of a number of people are screened on the wall. Scenes are intercut with a moment from the inauguration of the first ever black American president, Barack Obama. As the song begins Rihanna is shown singing the lyrics in front of a giant American flag. Other scenes such as rising up the flag, peaceful protests and imagery of a typical American family are also shown. Those are followed by inserts which include Martin Luther King Jr. and an American slave. Other scenes such as immigration in the country, the Apollo 11, the 1968 Olympics Black Power salute, Beatlemania, Occupy Wall Street, September 11 attacks and Black Lives Matter are also presented throughout the clip. At one point Rihanna is seen wearing a parachute suit while a big parachute is hanging on her back, struggling to crawl with it. It ends with Rihanna losing off her parachute. She looks in the camera "intently" and "tilts her head in a mildly defiant, almost challenging way".

=== Reception ===
In a review of the video, Alex Ungerman of Entertainment Tonight felt that the repetition of the word "breathe" is a very serious symbol and an important message linked to the death of Eric Garner. According to a writer of Capital FM, the video shows the patriotic side of Rihanna and the struggle experienced by the black people in the country and their success. Steven Gottlieb of Videostatic wrote that the video is, "is probably a bit more political than you might expect, utilizing a mix of news footage that runs the gamut from tragedy to transcendence." A Rap-Up-reviewer thought that with the visual Rihanna spreads her message of unity. Us Weekly's Madeline Boardman called the music video "stunning" and thought it was different than Rihanna's previous videos in which she is known for "pushing the boundaries". She also wrote, "the clip was celebrated by social media users as "powerful," "important," and "iconic." Zoe Anastasiou of Style website commented the fashion and wrote, "Rihanna's new video for 'American Oxygen' touches on issues of racial injustice and immigration, a far cry from the videos highlighting her bold (and oft barely-there) looks."

Daniel Kreps of Rolling Stone described the visual as, a quasi-time capsule feel, juxtaposing patriotic imagery with archival footage of the United States' most noteworthy historical events." He further wrote that, the video "similarly gazes inwards towards the nation" that results in a visual experience that could be seen in the visual for Billy Joel's 1989 single, "We Didn't Start the Fire". Time's Nolan Feeney thought that some of the presented historical moments "challenges readings of the song as a pure ode to the land of opportunity". Quartz's Flanagin disagreed with the critics who thought the video and the song were contradictory. According to him, "The message is clear: the life of the American immigrant is full of contradictions. To embark for the United States, illegally or with visa in hand, as a strawberry-picker or a pop-star, is an endeavor fueled by hope. But new arrivals often face intense social push back." Adam Fleischer of MTV News noted that "those clips span decades, relate to numerous situations and evoke an array of emotions", and eventually agreed with Feeney. Michelle Geslani of Consequence of Sound wrote, "It's a gripping visual that seems to pose the question: How far are we willing to go to protect this so-called Land of Opportunity?" The video has since been nominated for the Best Video With A Social Message at the 2015 MTV Video Music Awards.

== Live performances ==
On April 4, 2015, Rihanna performed at the Final Four of the 2015 NCAA Men's Division I Basketball Tournament, which was held in Indianapolis, Indiana. During the performance, she sang "American Oxygen" for the first time, as well as "Bitch Better Have My Money" and "FourFiveSeconds". The concert also featured Rihanna's older hits, such as "Stay", "We Found Love" and "Diamonds". Rihanna also performed the song on the 40th-season finale of Saturday Night Live, alongside "Bitch Better Have My Money".

== Awards and nominations ==
| Year | Award | Category | Result |
|---|---|---|---|
| 2015 | MTV Video Music Award | Best Video with a Social Message | Nominated |

== Charts and Certifications ==
=== Weekly charts ===
Weekly chart performance for "American Oxygen"
| Chart (2015) | Peak position |
|---|---|
| Australia (ARIA) | 65 |
| Austria (Ö3 Austria Top 40) | 52 |
| Belgium (Ultratip Bubbling Under Flanders) | 4 |
| Belgium (Ultratop Flanders Urban) | 16 |
| Belgium (Ultratip Bubbling Under Wallonia) | 6 |
| Canada Hot 100 (Billboard) | 59 |
| Czech Republic Singles Digital (ČNS IFPI) | 5 |
| Denmark (Tracklisten) | 22 |
| Finland (Suomen virallinen lista) | 19 |
| France (SNEP) | 25 |
| Germany (GfK) | 39 |
| Hungary (Single Top 40) | 24 |
| Hungary (Stream Top 40) | 6 |
| Ireland (IRMA) | 33 |
| Italy (FIMI) | 51 |
| Japan Hot 100 (Billboard) | 87 |
| Netherlands (Dutch Top 40 Tipparade) | 5 |
| Netherlands (Single Top 100) | 43 |
| Norway (VG-lista) | 25 |
| Slovakia Singles Digital (ČNS IFPI) | 6 |
| South Korea (Gaon Chart) | 27 |
| Spain (Promusicae) | 27 |
| Sweden (Sverigetopplistan) | 11 |
| Switzerland (Schweizer Hitparade) | 30 |
| UK Singles (Official Charts) | 71 |
| US Billboard Hot 100 | 78 |
| US Pop Airplay (Billboard) | 34 |

=== Year-end charts ===
2015 year-end chart performance for "American Oxygen"
| Chart (2015) | Position |
|---|---|
| Belgium (Ultratop Flanders Urban) | 52 |
| France (SNEP) | 189 |

=== Certifications ===
Certifications and sales for "American Oxygen"
| Region | Certification | Certified units/sales |
|---|---|---|
| Brazil (Pro-Música Brasil) | Gold | 30,000^{‡} |
| Denmark (IFPI Danmark) | Gold | 30,000^{^} |
| Poland (ZPAV) | Gold | 10,000^{*} |
| Sweden (GLF) | Platinum | 40,000^{‡} |
^{*} Sales figures based on certification alone.^{^} Shipments figures based on certification alone.^{‡} Sales+streaming figures based on certification alone.

== Release history ==
Release dates for "American Oxygen"
| Country | Date | Format | Label | Ref. |
|---|---|---|---|---|
| Australia | April 14, 2015 | Digital download | Roc Nation; Westbury Road | |
| Brazil | April 14, 2015 | Digital download | Roc Nation; Westbury Road | |
| France | April 14, 2015 | Digital download | Roc Nation; Westbury Road | |
| Germany | April 14, 2015 | Digital download | Roc Nation; Westbury Road | |
| Italy | April 14, 2015 | Digital download | Roc Nation; Westbury Road | |
| New Zealand | April 14, 2015 | Digital download | Roc Nation; Westbury Road | |
| Spain | April 14, 2015 | Digital download | Roc Nation; Westbury Road | |
| United Kingdom | April 14, 2015 | Digital download | Roc Nation; Westbury Road | |
| Canada | April 16, 2015 | Digital download | Roc Nation; Westbury Road | |
| United States | April 16, 2015 | Digital download | Roc Nation; Westbury Road | |
| United States | April 20, 2015 | Hot/Modern/AC radio | Roc Nation; Westbury Road | |
| United States | April 21, 2015 | Contemporary hit radio | Roc Nation; Westbury Road | |
