= Bitch Better Have My Money =

Single by Rihanna
- Released: March 26, 2015
- Recorded: 2014
- Genre: Trap
- Length: 3:39
- Label: Roc Nation; Westbury Road
- Songwriters: Robyn Fenty; Ebony Oshunrinde; Kanye West; Jacques Webster; Badriia Bourelly; Jamil Pierre
- Producers: Kuk Harrell; Kanye West; Deputy; WondaGurl; Travis Scott

Rihanna singles chronology
"Towards the Sun" (2015)	"Bitch Better Have My Money" (2015)	"American Oxygen" (2015)

Music video
- "Bitch Better Have My Money (Explicit)" on YouTube

"Bitch Better Have My Money" (censored as "B**** Better Have My Money", or simply "Better Have My Money") is a song by the Barbadian singer Rihanna. It was written by Rihanna, Bibi Bourelly, producer Deputy, co-producer Kanye West, and additional producers Travis Scott and WondaGurl. The song was digitally released on March 26, 2015, through the iTunes Store. "Bitch Better Have My Money" is a trap song and represents a notable musical departure from the previous single, "FourFiveSeconds".

Upon release critics gave the song mixed reviews, finding the song catchy and ready to be played in clubs, but thought it was a step down from the preceding single. The song placed at number 95 on Pitchfork's list of The 200 Best Songs of the 2010s Decade. "Bitch Better Have My Money" reached the top-10 in eight countries, including New Zealand and France, as well as the top-20 in six more countries including Canada, the United States and Australia. To promote the song, Rihanna performed at the 2nd iHeartRadio Music Awards on March 29, 2015. A accompanying music video was released on July 2, 2015.

== Production and composition ==
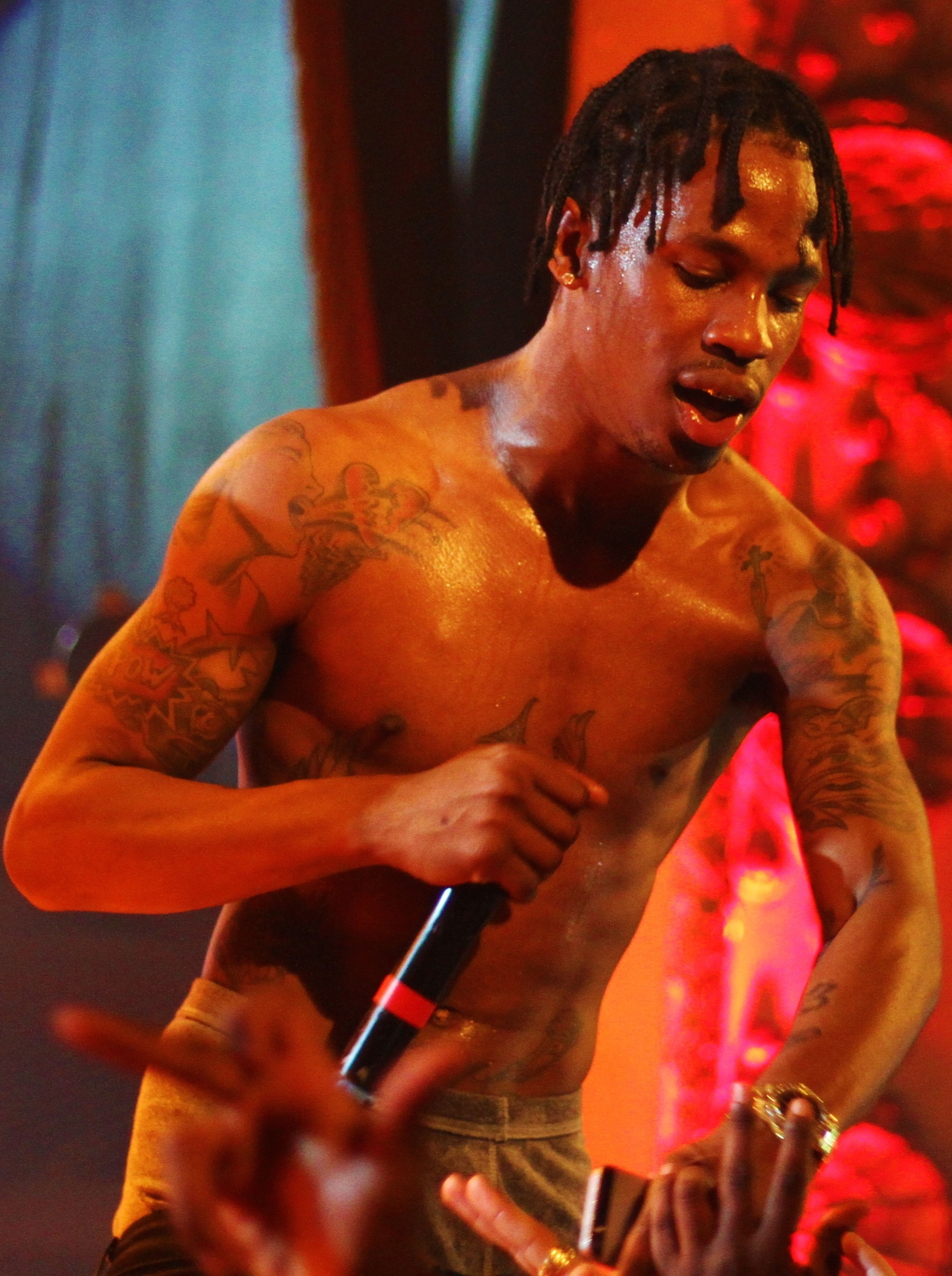
Travis Scott co-wrote and co-produced the song.

The song was conceived in producer Deputy's apartment and consisted of a simple beat. Development continued when the producer had a session with writer Bibi Bourelly, who went into the recording studio and began to freestyle the initial lyrics. The first lyric of her freestyle was "bitch better have my money" which later became the title of the completed song. Following the completion of the song, Deputy believed that Rihanna would be the artist for it, stating "This is definitely something that Rihanna needs to sing. We was trying to figure out who could do it because Bibi killed it. Not anyone could just sing this record."

After a certain period of time, Bourelly had a recording session with both West and Rihanna; it was the first time they heard the track and they both reacted positively to it. When they finally got a hold on the song, some changes were made to it. They were done by Scott, WondaGurl and West; all of them added an additional part by the end of the song. When Deputy was asked whether he was bothered by the adjustments that were made, he responded, "I thought it was cool. I didn't have any negative feelings to it. Rih[anna] loved it and it was really about what she wants."

"Bitch Better Have My Money" is a trap song with a length of three minutes and thirty-nine seconds. According to Jim Farber of New York Daily News the song is reminiscent of the works by West, particularly the half-sung and half-rapped vocals. To deliver the vocals, she uses her Caribbean accent. Farber also called the song "shadowy" and "repetitive" and according to him results in being more a riff than a full song. Billboard's Jason Lipshutz found the song similar to Rihanna's 2013 single "Pour It Up". Brittany Spanos of Rolling Stone noted that the song differs drastically from her previous 2015 single, "FourFiveSeconds", which featured a "gentle, acoustic tone". Similarly, Miles Raymer of Entertainment Weekly wrote that, "'Bitch Better Have My Money' is a trap-influenced banger that's a complete 180° difference from the "countryfied" sound of 'FourFiveSeconds'."

Lewis Corner of Digital Spy noted that the track represents a sequel to the music material present on Rihanna's seventh studio album, Unapologetic (2012), "with its swaggering hip-hop heartbeat and Rihanna's braggadocio callouts". Lyrically, the song features an angrier tone than "Rihanna's usual oeuvre", "Every time I drop I am the only thing y'all playing, Don't act like you forgot, I call the shots" proclaimed along with "machine-gun ad-libs". Lipshutz noted that the lyrical content of the song sounded inspired by Beyoncé's 2014 single "Flawless".

== Release ==
On March 25, 2015, via her official Twitter account, Rihanna posted, "rihannaNOW.com #R8 #BBHMM #March26". Subsequently, she posted the artwork of the song on her official Instagram account. The black-and-white cover features Rihanna with highlighted brows while wearing a motorcycle jacket; John Walker of MTV News assumed that it was shot by Dutch photographer duo Inez and Vinoodh, who did both the cover and the music video for "FourFiveSeconds". The title of the song is placed on the left side and is written in Braille.

According to Morwenna Ferrier of The Guardian, "Rihanna's new image screams Madonna circa-Vision Quest meets Paolo Roversi meets Frida Kahlo meets Boy George." Later that day, a snippet of the song was released via the Dubsmash application. On March 26, the song was made available for digital download via the iTunes Store. Subsequently, an edited version of the song was released under the title, "B**** Better Have My Money". The song was initially set to appear on Anti but was removed from the track listing, along with "FourFiveSeconds" and "American Oxygen".

== Critical reception ==
Rolling Stone wrote, "Her evolving sound has gotten much harder since her dance pop debut, and 'Bitch Better Have My Money' may be her hardest yet." The same magazine later ranked "Bitch Better Have My Money" at number 45 on its year-end list to find the 50 best songs of 2015. Jeff Pearson of Paste thought that the single is a "classic RiRi" in which she sounds confident and in control "more than ever". Stacy-Ann Ellis of Vibe described the song as "badass" and "bossy", "she confidently claims her place as the game's top shot-caller, and by song's end, you'll be feeling the same way."

Billboard's Lipshutz gave the song three out of five stars and wrote that although the song is not a right successor to Rihanna's previous [lead] singles such as "We Found Love" and "Only Girl (In the World)", it "is designed to make clubs rumble and arenas explode, and will successfully do so over the next year and beyond". In the same vein, Digital Spy's Corner also gave the song three out of five stars. Although Rihanna announced that she wanted her next project to feel soulful, regarding "Bitch Better Have My Money", he thought "It's a song for the club for sure, but as for that real and soulful sound? Maybe it's still to come." Corner and Amy Davidson, for the same publication, ranked the single at number three on their Playlist: 10 tracks you need to hear for the date March 31 and wrote, "'Bitch Better Have My Money' determines that the singer's new album will still bring plenty of fun."

=== Year-end lists ===
Publication	Rank	List	Ref.
Pitchfork Media	13	The 100 Best Tracks of 2015	
Rolling Stone	45	50 Best Songs of 2015	
Stereogum	13	The 50 Best Pop Songs of 2015	
The Village Voice	26	Pazz & Jop critics' poll, 2015	
Entertainment Weekly	40	The 40 Best Songs of 2015	

== Chart performance ==
=== North America ===
After selling 108,000 copies in its first four days of release, "Bitch Better Have My Money" debuted at number 23 on the US Billboard Hot 100 chart for the issue dated April 11, 2015. The following week, the song sold additional 133,000 copies, a 22% gain in sales compared to its debut week, and peaked at number four on the US Digital Songs chart. The same week, it only moved four places to number 19 on the Billboard Hot 100, due to the track being made available on Spotify two weeks after its digital download release, on April 8, 2015. Over its next 12 weeks on the chart, the song fluctuated in and out of the top 20 until the release of its music video in July 2015 led to a 65% spike in sales and 84% increase in streaming, fueling a leap from number 28 to its new peak of number 15; it sold 43,000 digital downloads and was streamed 10 million times in the United States that week.

Additionally, for the week dated June 20, 2015, the song peaked at number six on the US Rhythmic Chart and for the week dated July 18, it peaked at number five on the US Hot R&B/Hip-Hop Songs chart. The single also topped the US Dance Club Songs chart (dated June 27) and became Rihanna's 23rd number one in the chart's nearly 39-year history; she now trails only Madonna for the most No. 1s on the chart. On June 30, 2015, "Bitch Better Have My Money" was certified platinum by the Recording Industry Association of America (RIAA) denoting sales of over 1,000,000 digital copies.

In Canada, "Bitch Better Have My Money" debuted at number 29 on the Canadian Hot 100 for the week dated April 11. The next week it reached its peak of number 11 on the chart, for the issue dated April 18. The single also peaked at number 41 on the Canadian CHR/Top 40 Airplay.

=== Oceania and Europe ===
In Australia, "Bitch Better Have My Money" debuted and peaked at number 14 on the singles chart for the week dated April 12, 2015. Furthermore, it peaked at number five on the Australian Urban Singles Chart. The single was certified 4× Platinum by the Australian Recording Industry Association (ARIA), denoting sales of 280,000 equivalent units. In New Zealand, it debuted and peaked at number 10 for the week dated April 6. It became Rihanna's 32nd top-ten single on the chart. "Bitch Better Have My Money" was certified gold by the Recording Industry Association of New Zealand (RIANZ) for selling over 7,500 copies in the country.

In the United Kingdom, "Bitch Better Have My Money" debuted at number 29 on the UK Singles Chart for the week ending date March 29, 2015. The same week, it debuted at number six on the UK R&B Chart, and peaked at number five the next week. On April 5, 2015, the single peaked at number 27 on the UK Singles Chart. "Bitch Better Have My Money" was certified gold by the British Phonographic Industry (BPI), denoting sales of over 400,000 digital copies in the country. In Ireland, the song debuted at number 39 on the Irish Singles Chart for the week dated April 2. On April 23, in its fourth-week on the chart, it reached a new peak of 32. "Bitch Better Have My Money" was a commercial success in several countries of continental Europe, it reached the top-ten on 7 national charts and the top-twenty in 4 more countries.

In Sweden, the song debuted at number 38 on April 17, 2015, and it peaked at number 14 the next week. It stayed on the chart for 21 weeks total and was certified platinum by the Swedish Recording Industry Association (GLF) denoting sales of over 40,000 digital copies in the country and double platinum in Poland, by the Polish Society of the Phonographic Industry (ZPAV), denoting sales of 40,000 digital copies in the country. "Bitch Better Have My Money" debuted and peaked at number 25 on the Danish Singles Chart on April 24. It stayed on the chart for four consecutive weeks and was certified platinum by IFPI Denmark for shipping over 90,000 copies of the song in the country. The single was also certified gold in Italy, by the Federation of the Italian music industry (FIMI), denoting sales/streams of 25,000 copies. "Bitch Better Have My Money" was also successful in France, where it debuted and peaked at number three on the singles chart. It stayed at number three for 2 consecutive weeks and it charted for 35 weeks total, becoming Rihanna's nineteenth top ten. Finally, the track reached number one in Finland, number six in Spain and number seven in Switzerland.

== Music video ==
The video was directed by Rihanna and Megaforce, with cinematography from Benoît Debie, and was filmed in April 2015 in Los Angeles, with the boat scene being filmed at Marina Del Rey. The official trailer for the music video was released on June 28, 2015, at the BET Awards. The trailer captured a cryptic storyline: a rich woman, identity unknown, gets herself ready in her lavish apartment, clothes on and purse gathered in her arms, kisses her partner goodbye, and enters a dimly-lit elevator. As this occurs, Rihanna, wearing dark makeup, pulls up to the apartment complex at night. She opens up her car's trunk and pulls out a large suitcase. Struggling with the suitcase, she too enters the elevator. In one scene, the elevator doors close on the two standing women. In the next, the doors open and Rihanna struts out, alone, except for her heavy suitcase. The full video, which is seven minutes long, was released on Thursday, July 2, 2015, and was rated MA for graphic violence, nudity, and adult language. In France, the music video was broadcast after 10pm on music channels with a warning Not advised for kids under 12 years old (in French déconseillé aux moins de 12 ans) following the graphic violence, nudity and sexual scenes its content, although it was broadcast with blurring.

The actual plot of the video involves Rihanna and friends intoxicating and then later sadistically torturing the woman (Rachel Roberts), and also her corrupt accountant husband (Mads Mikkelsen), who has been stealing money. A video was later posted on Metro.com of deleted scenes from the video, showing the torture of the accountant in greater detail. The music video was inspired by Rihanna's real life experience with an accountant who cheated her of her money.

On November 18, 2016, it surpassed 100 million views, becoming the first age-restricted Vevo Certified video to reach that mark.

=== Year-end lists ===
Publication	Rank	List	Ref.
Complex	†	The Best Music Videos of 2015	
Consequence of Sound	4	Top 5 Music Videos of 2015	
Entertainment Weekly	5	The 25 Best Music Videos of 2015	
Huffington Post	25	The 25 Best Music Videos of 2015	
Pitchfork Media	4	The Best Music Videos of 2015	
Time	2	Top 10 Pop Music Videos of 2015	
"†" denotes an unordered list.

== Live performances ==
Rihanna performed "Bitch Better Have My Money" for the first time at the 2nd iHeartRadio Music Awards on March 29, 2015. During the performance, Rihanna wore a short black dress accompanied with a green Versace coat and high boots of the same color. The performance featured her emerging from a helicopter; after delivering the lyrics she left the microphone and "broke out into dance". Billboard's Stacy Anderson praised Rihanna's confidence during the performance and noted that the, "track's confrontational lyrics were delivered in full, the several profane moments bleeped live." Will Robinson of Entertainment Weekly labeled the performance as one of the five best things that happened during the award ceremony. Regarding the performance, Paul Thompson of Rolling Stone wrote, "there were no giggles, winks or nods at the camera, making the performance a welcome piece of method acting in a night hampered by production snafus and anticlimaxes. New York Daily News praised Rihanna's entrance on stage and wrote "As usual, the singing sensation did not disappoint and delivered a high-energy, show-stopping performance!" Carolyn Menyes of Music Times also praised the singer's performance, stating that "Her vocal performance was strong, as she barked out the lyrics", adding that "she was filled with attitude and swagger."

On April 1, Rihanna pranked Jimmy Kimmel by creeping into his house on April Fools' Day and went into his bedroom to play "Bitch Better Have My Money".

On April 4, 2015, Rihanna performed the song at the Final Four of the March Madness 2015, which was held in Indianapolis, Indiana.

On May 16, 2015, Rihanna performed the song on Saturday Night Live as her fifth appearance on the show.

On September 9, 2015, Ellen DeGeneres lip synced the song on The Tonight Show Starring Jimmy Fallon as part of a standard comedy bit with host Jimmy Fallon. Rihanna performed the song during the 2016 MTV Video Music Awards in a medley with "Pour It Up" and "Needed Me".

On April 20, 2018, Ecca Vandal covered the song for Triple J's Like a Version.

"Bitch Better Have My Money" also served as the opening number for Rihanna at the Super Bowl LVII halftime show.

== Awards and nominations ==
Year	Award	Category	Result	Ref.
2015	MTV Iggy	International Song of the Summer	Nominated	
2015	Soul Train Awards	Song of the Year	Nominated	
2015	Teen Choice Awards	Choice Party Song	Nominated	
2015	Teen Choice Awards	Choice R&B/Hip-Hop Song	Nominated	
2015	UK Music Video Awards	Best Pop Video – International	Won	
2015	UK Music Video Awards	Best Styling In A Video	Won	
2015	Capricho Awards	Melhor Clipe Internacional	Nominated	
2016	NME Award	Best Music Video	Nominated	—N/a

== Track listing ==
Digital download (Explicit version)
No.	Title	Length
1.	"Bitch Better Have My Money"	3:39

Digital download (Clean version)
No.	Title	Length
1.	"B**** Better Have My Money"	3:39

Digital download – Don Corleon Dancehall Remix
No.	Title	Length
1.	"Bitch Better Have My Money" (featuring Beenie Man and Bounty Killer)	3:28

Digital download – GTA Remix
No.	Title	Length
1.	"Bitch Better Have My Money" (GTA Remix)	3:48

Digital download – Michael Woods Remix
No.	Title	Length
1.	"Bitch Better Have My Money" (Michael Woods Remix)	4:24

Digital download – R3hab Remix
No.	Title	Length
1.	"Bitch Better Have My Money" (R3hab Remix)	3:48

== Charts ==
=== Weekly charts ===
Weekly chart performance for "Bitch Better Have My Money"
Chart (2015)	Peak position
Australia (ARIA)	14
Australia Urban (ARIA)	5
Austria (Ö3 Austria Top 40)	18
Belgium (Ultratop 50 Flanders)	27
Belgium (Ultratop 50 Wallonia)	11
Belgium (Ultratop Flanders Urban)	7
Canada Hot 100 (Billboard)	11
Canada CHR/Top 40 (Billboard)	37
Czech Republic Singles Digital (ČNS IFPI)	15
Denmark (Tracklisten)	25
Euro Digital Song Sales (Billboard)	10
Finland Download (Latauslista)	1
France (SNEP)	3
Germany (GfK)	17
Hungary (Single Top 40)	8
Hungary (Stream Top 40)	12
Ireland (IRMA)	32
Italy (FIMI)	49
Lebanon (Lebanese Top 20)	6
Luxembourg Digital Song Sales (Billboard)	8
Netherlands (Dutch Top 40 Tipparade)	2
Netherlands (Single Top 100)	37
New Zealand (Recorded Music NZ)	10
Norway (VG-lista)	24
Scottish Singles Sales (Official Charts)	18
Slovakia Singles Digital (ČNS IFPI)	9
Spain (Promusicae)	24
Sweden (Sverigetopplistan)	14
Switzerland (Schweizer Hitparade)	7
UK Singles (Official Charts)	27
UK Hip Hop/R&B (Official Charts)	5
US Billboard Hot 100	15
US Hot R&B/Hip-Hop Songs (Billboard)	5
US Dance Airplay (Billboard)	37
US Dance Club Songs (Billboard)	1
US Rhythmic Airplay (Billboard)	6

2023 weekly chart performance for "Bitch Better Have My Money"
Chart (2023)	Peak position
Canada (Canadian Hot 100)	48
Global 200 (Billboard)	79
US Digital Song Sales (Billboard)	13

=== Year-end charts ===
2015 year-end chart performance for "Bitch Better Have My Money"
Chart (2015)	Position
Australia Urban (ARIA)	19
Belgium (Ultratop Flanders Urban)	33
Belgium (Ultratop Wallonia)	75
Canada (Canadian Hot 100)	76
France (SNEP)	36
Hungary (Single Top 40)	97
US Billboard Hot 100	48
US Dance Club Songs (Billboard)	9
US Hot R&B/Hip-Hop Songs (Billboard)	14
US Rhythmic (Billboard)	28

== Certifications ==
Certifications for "Bitch Better Have My Money"
Region	Certification	Certified units/sales
Australia (ARIA)	4× Platinum	280,000^{‡}
Brazil (Pro-Música Brasil)	Diamond	250,000^{‡}
Denmark (IFPI Danmark)	Platinum	90,000^{‡}
France (SNEP)	Gold	66,666^{‡}
Germany (BVMI)	Gold	200,000^{‡}
Italy (FIMI)	Platinum	50,000^{‡}
New Zealand (RMNZ)	3× Platinum	90,000^{‡}
Poland (ZPAV)	2× Platinum	40,000^{‡}
Spain (Promusicae)	Platinum	60,000^{‡}
Sweden (GLF)	Platinum	40,000^{‡}
United Kingdom (BPI)	Platinum	600,000^{‡}
United States (RIAA)	4× Platinum	4,000,000^{‡}
Streaming
Greece (IFPI Greece)	Gold	1,000,000^{†}
^{‡} Sales+streaming figures based on certification alone.^{†} Streaming-only figures based on certification alone.

== Radio and release history ==
Radio dates for "Bitch Better Have My Money"
Country	Date	Format	Label	Ref.
Brazil	March 26, 2015	Digital download	Roc Nation; Westbury Road	
Canada	March 26, 2015	Digital download	Roc Nation; Westbury Road	
Germany	March 26, 2015	Digital download	Roc Nation; Westbury Road	
France	March 26, 2015	Digital download	Roc Nation; Westbury Road	
Italy	March 26, 2015	Digital download	Roc Nation; Westbury Road	
New Zealand	March 26, 2015	Digital download	Roc Nation; Westbury Road	
Spain	March 26, 2015	Digital download	Roc Nation; Westbury Road	
United Kingdom	March 26, 2015	Digital download	Roc Nation; Westbury Road	
United States	March 26, 2015	Digital download	Roc Nation; Westbury Road	
United Kingdom	April 6, 2015	Mainstream radio	Roc Nation; Westbury Road	
United Kingdom	May 3, 2015	Digital download (GTA Remix) (Michael Woods Remix)	Roc Nation; Westbury Road	
United Kingdom	May 4, 2015	Digital download (R3hab Remix)	Roc Nation; Westbury Road	
United Kingdom	May 18, 2015	Mainstream radio (re-release)	Roc Nation; Westbury Road	
United States	June 16, 2015	Mainstream radio	Roc Nation; Westbury Road	

== See also ==
- List of number-one dance singles of 2015 (U.S.)
- Artists with the most number-ones on the U.S. dance chart
