= Willie B. =

Western lowland gorilla

Coordinates: 33.73185°N 84.37057°W

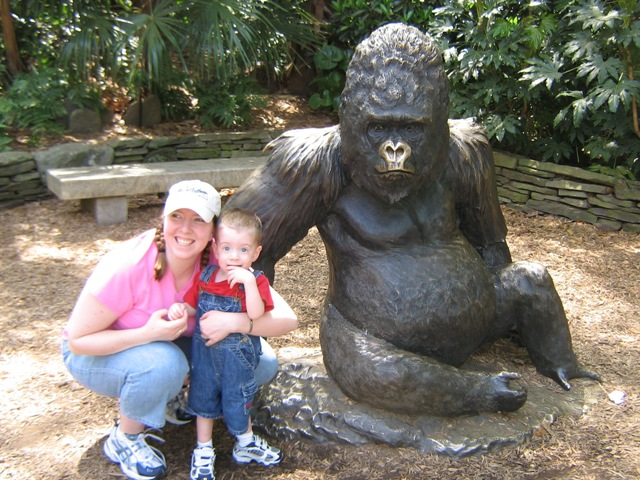
- Willie B. statue at Zoo Atlanta
- Born: c. 1958
- Died: February 2, 2000 (aged 42–43)
- Resting place: Zoo Atlanta
- Residence: Zoo Atlanta
- Offspring: Kudzoo, Olympia, Sukari, Kidogo, and Lulu
- Named after: William Berry Hartsfield

Willie B. (c. 1958 – February 2, 2000) was a western lowland gorilla who lived at the Zoo of Atlanta for 39 years, from 1961 until his death on February 2, 2000. He was named after the former mayor of Atlanta, William Berry Hartsfield. Willie B. was kept in isolation for 27 years with only a television and a tire swing to keep him company. In 1988, he was moved to an outside exhibit and allowed to socialize and raise a family. He then embraced his role as silverback and leader of a troop.

Willie B. was the second gorilla known by that name at Zoo Atlanta. The previous Willie B. had died aged 3 shortly before the better-known successor was purchased. Both Willie B.'s had been purchased from international gorilla hunter Dr. Deets Pickett of Kansas City. The second Willie B. cost $5,500 to obtain for the zoo.

== Life and captivity ==
=== Early life ===
Willie B. was born in 1958 in Africa's western lowlands. In 1960, he was captured in Cameroon by animal dealer Dr. Deets Pickett of Kansas City, who would later sell him to Zoo Atlanta to replace their original gorilla at the request of Mayor Hartsfield. The gorilla quickly became popular with the zoo's visitors, with Hartsfield himself nominating the ape for congress.

For much of his captivity at Zoo Atlanta, Willie B. was kept in a glass-enclosed cage, with only a television and a tire swing to entertain himself with. The television was later stolen in 1979 just before that year's NFL playoffs. In a series of articles that were published to WellBeing International in 2023, former zoo director Terry L. Maple recounted his first experience with the gorilla:

In 1975, when I arrived in Atlanta to join the faculty of Emory University, I met Willie B. for the first time. He was approximately 17 years old. The thick iron bars and unbreakable glass barriers that confined him made him look like a felon. Of course, he was imprisoned through no fault of his own. He was clearly a victim, and I immediately felt sorry for him.

=== Renovations ===
In 1984, several exotic animals died at Zoo Atlanta, causing a sudden wave of negative media coverage. As a result, the zoo failed an accreditation inspection by the Association of Zoos and Aquariums. The zoo went into "crisis mode" after several publications picked up the story, with Parade naming it one of the worst zoos in the country. An Atlanta cover story said that "[m]ournfully wailing apes and restlessly pacing, bowlegged jungle cats housed in enclosures too small for your pet Siamese are just part of the problem”. With pressure from the media increasing, as well as Atlanta's citizens calling for the zoo's reform, mayor and civil rights activist Andrew Young worked to help the zoo improve its facilities. This included replacing former zoo director Steve Dobbs with Maple, who was a professor at the Georgia Institute of Technology at the time.

When the zoo underwent renovations in the mid 1980s, special emphasis was placed on their gorillas due to Willie B.'s enclosure often being cited in negative reports. As a result, Ford Motor Company and the Yerkes Primate Research Center entered into a partnership to design a new exhibit for the zoo's gorillas. This exhibit, called the Ford African Rainforest exhibit, opened in 1988 and would replace Willie B.'s original enclosure. Eight additional lowland gorillas, provided by Yerkes, lived in the exhibit as well.

On May 13, 1988, nearly 25,000 people gathered to watch Willie B. enter his new outdoor habitat, an attendance that was previously unprecedented in the zoo's history.

=== Socialization ===
Due to the amount of time Willie B. had spent in solitary captivity, he had to be retaught how to socialize with his fellow gorillas. The initiative was considered a success when Kinyani, a smaller female gorilla in his enclosure, appeared to begin mating with him. She was described as "sitting very close and staring into his eyes", which eventually turned into copulation, though according to the zoo, Kinyani was too young to become pregnant. Maple said that the event was "a significant milestone for Willie B., who was now a social gorilla with a demonstrated sex drive." He added that their socialization experiment "exceeded their expectations," with the ape's sociability contributing to his status as "Atlanta's iconic ape."

Willie B. fathered five offspring during his time at Zoo Atlanta, being Kudzoo, Olympia, Sukari, Willie B., Jr. (formerly Kidogo), and Lulu.

== Death ==
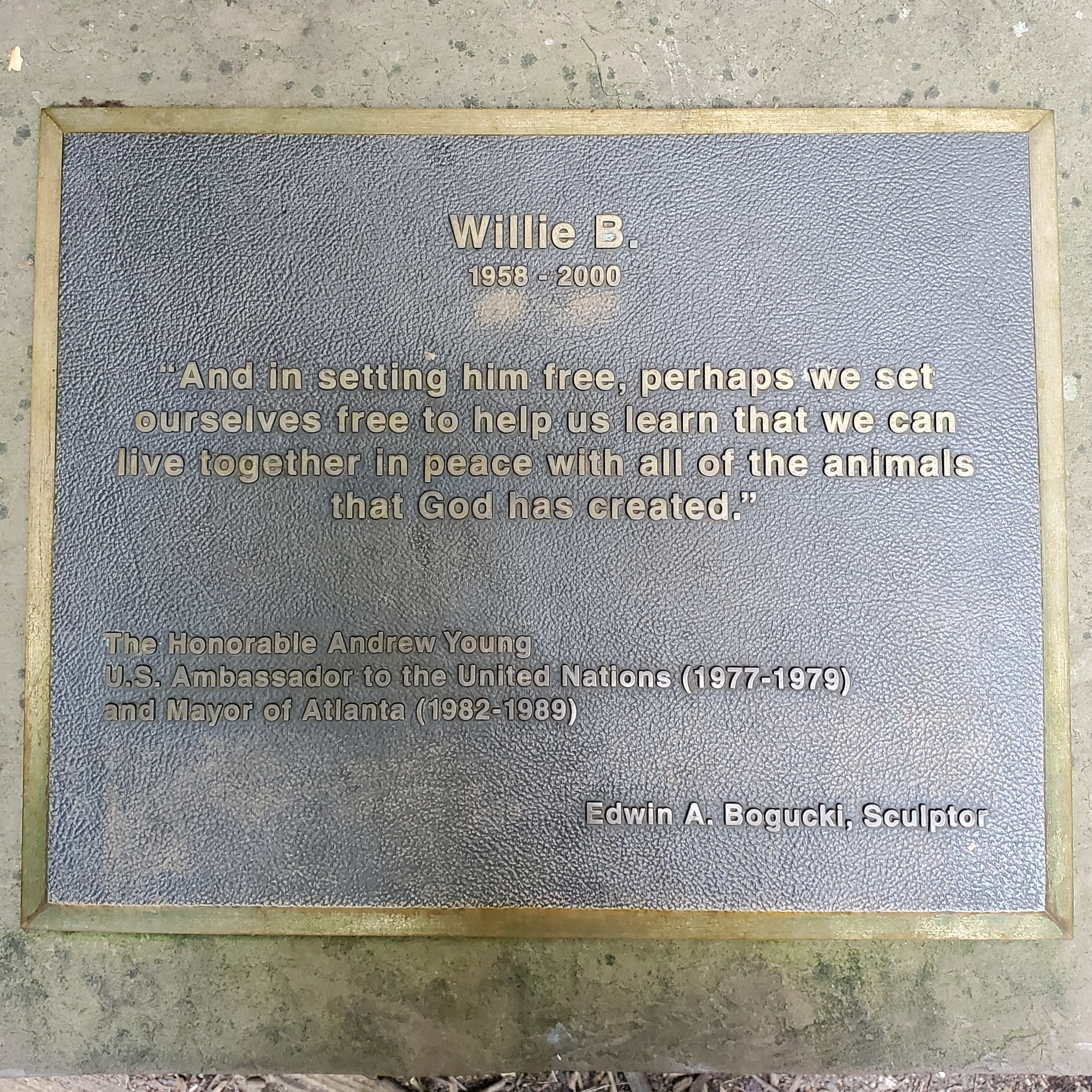
Willie B.'s plaque

In January 2000, Willie B. simultaneously contract influenza and pneumonia, causing immense stress on his heart. Due to his pneumonia, as well as struggles with cardiomyopathy, he died on February 2, 2000. More than 5,000 people attended the gorilla's memorial ceremony, with Mayor Young delivering a eulogy in his honor:

"We looked at him in his cage, and we knew that he didn’t belong there. He was brought here in captivity, but he found a way to appeal to our hearts so that we were moved to find ways to set him free. And in setting him free, perhaps we set ourselves free to help us learn that we can live together in peace with all of the animals that God has created [...] We don’t know what the animals think of us, but we sure know that we love them [...] love can be multiplied and can bear fruits that are not unimagined by any of us at present. But when we do see wonderful things happening between men and women and animals, let’s remember this giant lovable gorilla who was almost human. Thank God for Willie B."

Willie B. was one of the zoo's oldest animals, having lived at the zoo for 38 years before his death.

== Legacy ==
Shortly after Willie B.'s death, artist Ed Bogucki was commissioned by Zoo Atlanta to create a life-sized bronze statue of the gorilla. The statue is displayed outside the zoo's gorilla exhibit. His body was cremated, with 80 percent of his remains stored inside the statue and the remaining 20 percent being flown back to his birth place in Africa.

Atlanta said that the gorilla "was more than the patriarch of a growing brood of majestic silverback gorillas; he was a symbol of Atlanta's fighting spirit and indefatigable will to turn embarrassment into civic pride."

== See also ==
- List of individual apes
