= Jackie Evancho discography =

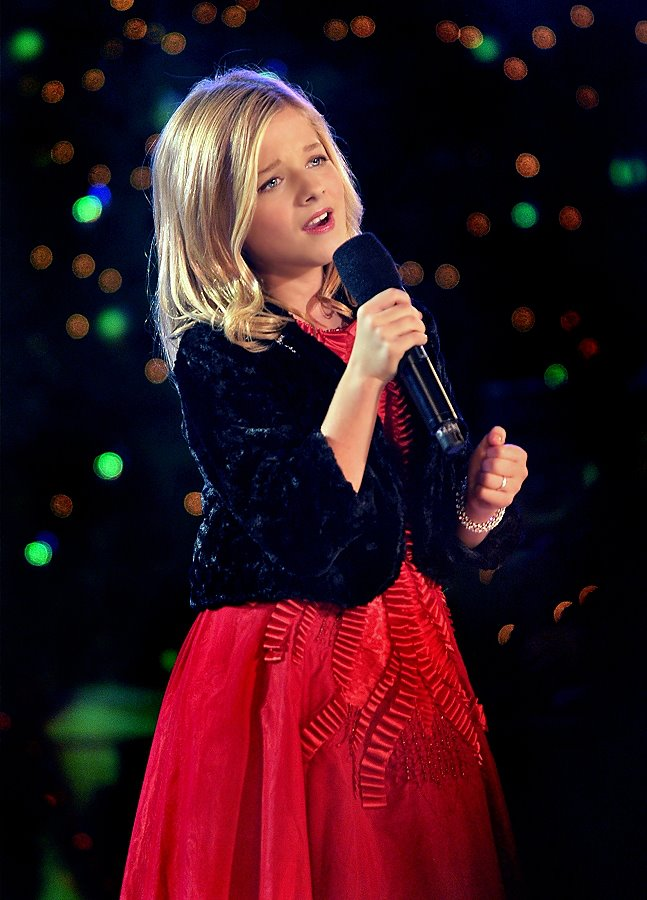
- Evancho in 2011, singing "Believe" from Heavenly Christmas
- Studio albums: 9
- Extended plays: 3
- Live albums: 3
- Singles: 41
- Music videos: 19

This article is the discography of American singer Jackie Evancho and includes all the studio albums, live albums, EPs and singles, as well as the peak chart positions, for the United States (Billboard 200, Billboard's Classical Albums and Classical Digital Songs), Canada, Ireland, Japan, Mexico, New Zealand and United Kingdom. It also shows the relevant certifications from RIAA and Music Canada, and related sales figures.

Evancho has released nine studio albums and 3 EPs, in addition to singles and music videos. Seven of Evancho's studio albums and her first EP have charted on the Billboard 200, four of them in the top 11, and three dozen of her songs have charted on the US Classical Digital Songs chart, Holiday Digital Songs chart or Adult Contemporary chart. Between November 2010 and October 2012, Evancho sold an estimated 2.1 million albums domestically. By 2015, she had sold over 3 million albums. She has also released three live albums, all produced by PBS, based on three of her studio albums.

From 2010 to 2019, Evancho released eight consecutive No. 1 discs on Billboard's Classical Albums Chart.

== Chart performance analysis ==
Evancho, at age 10, was the youngest solo artist ever to debut in the top 10 on the Billboard 200, and the youngest solo artist ever to go platinum in the US. As of June 2015, Evancho had sold a total of more than 3 million albums.

Billboard ranked Evancho's first major-label recording, O Holy Night, which debuted at No. 2 on the Billboard 200, as the top Classical Album of 2011 (their year ran from December 2010 through November 2011). It ranked her next two albums, Dream with Me and Heavenly Christmas (which debuted, respectively, at No. 2 and No. 11 on the Billboard 200) at No. 2 and No. 4, respectively, on its Classical Albums chart for the year 2011. For the year 2011, it ranked O Holy Night as the No. 15 best-selling album, Dream with Me as the No. 45 album, and Heavenly Christmas as the No. 105 album. It ranked the first two as the No. 4 and No. 10 Internet Albums of the year, respectively. It also ranked O Holy Night as the No. 31 Canadian Album of 2011. Dream with Me spent 30 consecutive weeks on the Billboard 200 and spent 74 consecutive weeks on the Billboard Classical Albums chart. Dream with Me peaked at No. 4 on the aCharts World Albums Top 40 chart.

Billboard ranked Evancho as the No. 10 Billboard 200 Artist of 2011, the No. 1 Classical Albums Artist, and the No. 3 Internet Albums Artist of that year. The No. 7 debut of Songs from the Silver Screen on the Billboard 200, in 2012, made the 12-year-old Evancho the second artist who ever "amassed three top 10 albums [on the Billboard 200] at such a young age." On its year-end Classical Albums chart for 2012, Billboard ranked Heavenly Christmas No. 2, Dream with Me No. 5 and Songs from the Silver Screen No. 7. Evancho ranked as the No. 37 Billboard 200 artist of 2012 and the No. 2 Classical Albums Artist of that year. Heavenly Christmas also ranked No. 41 on the year-end Canadian Albums chart for 2012. Billboard ranked Evancho the No. 5 Classical Albums Artist of 2013, even though she did not release any new albums during the year. Her 2012 album Songs from the Silver Screen was the No. 4 Classical Album of 2013 and appeared on the Billboard Classical Albums chart in 72 weeks.

Awakening debuted at No. 17 on the Billboard 200 chart and No. 1 on the Billboard Classical Albums chart, Evancho's fifth consecutive No. 1 release on that chart. Billboard ranked Awakening as the No. 11 best-selling Classical Album of 2014 (Songs from the Silver Screen was ranked No. 36 for 2014), and Evancho was the No. 7 Classical Albums Artist of 2014. Awakening was ranked on the Billboard 200 for a total of nine weeks and remained on the Billboard Classical Albums chart for a consecutive 72 weeks. Evancho was the No. 4 Classical Albums Artist of 2015, as Awakening was the No. 3 best-selling classical album of 2015. Someday at Christmas peaked at No. 1 on the Billboard Classical Albums chart, her sixth consecutive album to do so. Evancho was the No. 12 Classical Albums Artist of 2016 as Someday at Christmas was the No. 27 best-selling classical album of 2016, and Awakening was the No. 31 best-selling classical album of 2016. Two Hearts and The Debut each debuted at No 1 on Billboard's Classical Albums Chart, her seventh and eighth consecutive No. 1 albums on that chart.

== Studio albums ==
Title	Album details	Peak chart positions								Sales	Certifications (sales threshold)
Title	Album details	US	US Class	CAN	IRE	JPN	MEX	NZ	UK	Sales	Certifications (sales threshold)
Prelude to a Dream	Release date: November 10, 2009; Label: Self-released; Format: CD, digital download	121	2	—	—	—	—	—	—	US: 4,000	
Dream with Me	Release date: June 3, 2011; Label: Syco/Columbia; Format: CD, digital download	2	1	5	15	37	26	8	4	US: 730,000	US: Gold; UK: Silver
Heavenly Christmas	Release date: November 1, 2011; Label: Syco/Columbia; Format: CD, digital download	11	1	9	—	—	—	—	—	US: 341,000	
Songs from the Silver Screen	Release date: October 2, 2012; Label: Syco/Columbia; Format: CD, digital download	7	1	22	—	141	—	—	—	US: 116,000	
Awakening	Release date: September 23, 2014; Label: Portrait; Format: CD, digital download	17	1	—	—	—	—	—	—	US: 103,300	
Someday at Christmas	Release date: October 28, 2016; Label: Portrait; Format: CD, digital download	93	1	—	—	—	—	—	—	US: 30,000	
Two Hearts	Release date: March 31, 2017; Label: Portrait; Format: CD, digital download	100	1	—	—	—	—	—	—		
The Debut	Release date: April 12, 2019; Label: JE Touring; Format: CD, digital download	—	1	—	—	—	—	—	—		
Carousel of Time	Release date: September 9, 2022; Label: Jackie Evancho; Format: CD, digital download	—	—	—	—	—	—	—	—		
"—" denotes releases that did not chart

== Live albums ==
Dream With Me In Concert was filmed at the Ringling Museum of Art in Sarasota, Florida in April 2011 and broadcast repeatedly as a PBS Great Performances special. It topped the Billboard "Top Music Video" chart in the US in two of its first four weeks, and Billboard ranked it as the No. 21 music video DVD of 2011. It charted in Mexico at No. 75 and in Japan at No. 294. Billboard ranked Dream With Me In Concert as the No. 16 music video album of 2012, and it remained on the Billboard.biz Top Music Video chart for 64 weeks.

Jackie Evancho: Music of the Movies was filmed in June 2012 at the Orpheum Theatre in Los Angeles. It features the same selections as Songs from the Silver Screen. Like Evancho's first live album, this video was also broadcast as a Great Performances special, by PBS stations, beginning on August 11, 2012. The DVD accompanied the Songs from the Silver Screen CD release by Target stores.

Evancho's third PBS special, Awakening: Live in Concert, was filmed in August 2014 at Longwood Gardens in Pennsylvania. It began airing on PBS stations on November 29, 2014; Cheyenne Jackson co-hosts and sings "Say Something" as a duet with Evancho. The special includes all of the songs from Awakening, plus "Say Something" and "O mio babbino caro". A DVD, initially available as a PBS pledge gift, additionally includes "My Immortal". It later became available at most distributors. In its first week of release, it charted at No. 3 on the Billboard Music Video Sales chart and remained on that chart for eight weeks.

Title	Album details	Peak chart positions		
Title	Album details	US	MEX	JPN
Dream With Me In Concert	Release date: September 12, 2011; Label: Sony / Columbia / Syco	1	75	294
Jackie Evancho: Music of the Movies	Release date: 2012; Label: Sony / Columbia	Released only as a PBS gift or bundled with Songs from the Silver Screen		
Awakening: Live in Concert	Release date: 2014 (PBS); June 2015; Label: Sony Masterworks / Portrait	3	—	—
"—" denotes releases that did not chart

== EPs ==
Title	EP details	Peak chart positions				Sales	Certifications (sales threshold)
Title	EP details	US	US Class	CAN	JPN	Sales	Certifications (sales threshold)
O Holy Night	Release date: November 16, 2010; Label: Syco; Format: CD, digital download, DVD	2	1	9	93	US: 1,190,000	US: Platinum; CAN: Platinum
Together We Stand	Release date: January 19, 2017; Label: Format: CD, digital download, DVD	—	—	—	—		
Solla	Release date: May 3, 2024; Label: Format: CD, digital download, DVD	—	—	—	—		
"—" denotes releases that did not chart

== Singles ==
Year	Title	Peak positions	Album
Year	Title	US Class	Album
2010	"O mio babbino caro"	1	Prelude to a Dream
2010	"Everytime"	3	Prelude to a Dream
2010	"Ave Maria"	5	Prelude to a Dream
2010	"Concrete Angel"	6	Prelude to a Dream
2010	"Amazing Grace"	11	Prelude to a Dream
2010	"Con te partirò"	12	Prelude to a Dream
2010	"Think of Me"	15	Prelude to a Dream
2010	"Starry Starry Night (Vincent)"	21	Prelude to a Dream
2010	"The Prayer"	24	Prelude to a Dream
2010	"Panis angelicus"	7	O Holy Night
2010	"Pie Jesu"	—	O Holy Night
2011	"O Holy Night"	7	O Holy Night
2011	"Silent Night"	25	O Holy Night
2011	"Somewhere" (with Barbra Streisand)	1	Dream with Me
2011	"A Mother's Prayer" (with Susan Boyle)	2	Dream with Me
2011	"All I Ask of You"	4	Dream with Me
2011	"Angel"	4	Dream with Me
2011	"When You Wish Upon a Star"	7	Dream with Me
2011	"Dream with Me"	11	Dream with Me
2011	"The Lord's Prayer"	12	Dream with Me
2011	"Nella Fantasia"	14	Dream with Me
2011	"Lovers"	23	Dream with Me
2011	"Nessun dorma"	6	Dream with Me
2012	"To Believe"	12	Dream with Me
2012	"The Music of the Night"	9	Songs from the Silver Screen
2012	"My Heart Will Go On"	17	Songs from the Silver Screen
2014	"The Rains of Castamere"	7	Awakening
2014	"Think of Me"	3	Awakening
2014	"Hallelujah" (with Peter Hollens)	4	Peter Hollens
2015	"All of the Stars"	15	Non-album single
2016	"Writing's on the Wall"	2	Two Hearts
2017	"The Star-Spangled Banner"	2	Together We Stand §
2017	"America the Beautiful"	4	Together We Stand §
2017	"God Bless America"	5	Together We Stand §
2017	"How Great Thou Art"	15	Two Hearts
2020	"River"	—	Carousel of Time
2022	"Both Sides Now"	—	Carousel of Time
2022	"A Case of You"	—	Carousel of Time
2022	"Blue"	—	Carousel of Time
2024	"Smoking Gun"	—	Solla
2024	"Behind My Eyes"	—	Solla
"—" denotes releases that did not chart

§ On January 20, 2017, Evancho released Together We Stand, a three-song EP.

== Videos and other collaborations ==
In addition to the videos of her live albums, Evancho has released videos of songs, including "Silent Night", from her album O Holy Night, and three songs from Heavenly Christmas. Idolator readers chose one of these, "Believe", as their "Favorite Christmas Song" for 2011. The video of Believe charted at No. 1 on the Yahoo Video chart for the week of January 7, 2012. Evancho released videos of two singles of songs from Awakening: "The Rains of Castamere" from the TV series Game of Thrones and "Think of Me" from The Phantom of the Opera. In 2014, she released a video of a pop song, "Go Time", in collaboration with Justice Girls Clothing. In 2015, she released videos of her singles "All of the Stars" and "Safe & Sound". In 2016, she released videos for her singles "Writing's on the Wall", "Coming Home, Pt. II" and "Apocalypse", an original pop song by Peter Zizzo In 2017, Evancho released a video of "Attesa" from her album Two Hearts. From her independent album The Debut, she released videos of the show tunes "Burn" and "I'm Not That Girl". From her 2022 album Carousel of Time, she released videos of Joni Mitchell's "River" and "Both Sides Now".

Official videos

- "Silent Night" (2010)
- "I'll Be Home for Christmas" (2011)
- "The First Noel" (2011)
- "Believe" (2011)
- "The Rains of Castamere" (2014)
- "Go Time" for Justice Girls Clothing (2014)
- "Think of Me" (2014)
- "All of the Stars" (2015)
- "Safe & Sound" (2015)
- "Writing's on the Wall" (2016)
- "Coming Home, Pt. II" (2016)
- "Apocalypse" (2016)
- "Pedestal" (2017)
- "Attesa" (2017)
- "Burn" (2019)
- "I'm Not That Girl" (2019)
- "River" (2020)
- "Both Sides Now" (2022)
- "Behind My Eyes" (2024)

Evancho has been included on albums of other artists, including Tony Bennett ("When You Wish Upon a Star", 2011), David Foster ("Pie Jesu", 2011), Vittorio Grigolo ("O Holy Night", 2013), Jumaane Smith ("La Vie en Rose", 2014), Peter Hollens ("Hallelujah", 2014) and Plácido Domingo ("Pie Jesu", 2015).
