= Jackie Evancho concert tours =

List of Jackie Evancho's concert tours

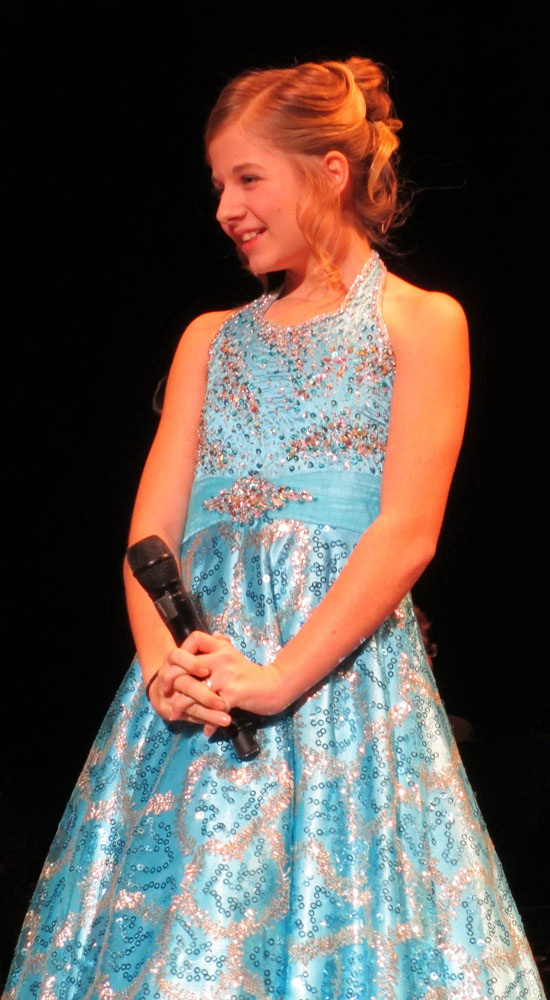
Evancho on tour in January 2013

The following is a description of Jackie Evancho's concert tours, not including Evancho's joint concerts with other artists (aside from the AGT Live Tour). This article also does not list filmings for Evancho's television appearances (although it mentions her PBS specials in the narrative text) or include any information about her charity and festival concerts and private appearances. The most noteworthy of Evancho's concerts not listed here are mentioned in her main Wikipedia article.

After her 2nd-place finish in the 5th season of America's Got Talent in 2010, Evancho participated in the America's Got Talent: Live Tour. Beginning in 2011, she headlined solo concert tours to promote each of her albums.

== America's Got Talent: Live Tour ==
America's Got Talent: Live Tour
- National tour by Jackie Evancho
- Location: United States
- Start date: October 1, 2010
- End date: November 5, 2010
- No. of shows: 10

The America's Got Talent: Live Tour was the official tour to promote the finalists of the fifth season of America's Got Talent. Evancho was the first runner-up in that competition, finishing second to singer Michael Grimm. The tour began on October 1, 2010, and ended on November 7, 2010, with shows in 25 cities; Evancho sang in 10 of them.

Evancho performed songs in both the first half and second half of each show in which she participated, and bantered with host Jerry Springer. A review of the first tour stop that Evancho participated in, on October 1, 2010, in Oakland, California, noted: "She has the gift to carry a note so nicely and so gracefully."

=== Tour dates ===
Date	City	State	Venue
October 1, 2010	Oakland	California	Paramount Theatre
October 2, 2010	Reno	Nevada	Reno Events Center
October 7, 2010	Los Angeles	California	Nokia Theatre L.A. Live
October 16, 2010	Minneapolis	Minnesota	Northrop Auditorium
October 17, 2010	Milwaukee	Wisconsin	Riverside Theater
October 27, 2010	New York City	New York	Beacon Theatre
October 28, 2010	Richmond	Virginia	Landmark Theater
November 3, 2010	Boston	Massachusetts	Wang Theatre
November 4, 2010	Washington, D.C.		DAR Constitution Hall
November 5, 2010	Greensboro	North Carolina	War Memorial Auditorium

== Dream With Me Tour ==
Dream With Me In Concert
- Tour by Jackie Evancho
- Location: Japan; U.S.
- Associated album: Dream with Me
- Start date: July 31, 2011
- End date: June 8, 2012
- No. of shows: 18

The Dream With Me Tour, Evancho's first solo tour, promoted her album Dream with Me. It consisted of a series of performances at indoor and outdoor concert venues with symphony orchestras; most of the 2011 concerts were conducted by Constantine Kitsopoulos. Unofficially, the tour began on February 18, 2011, when Evancho performed most of the songs that would be included in Dream With Me in Houston, Texas, with the Houston Chamber Choir. On March 12, she sang these songs at the 2011 Festival of the Arts Boca. Evancho filmed a solo concert television special for the PBS Great Performances series that included nearly the same songs as the CD and first aired in June 2011 on PBS stations and later released on DVD, titled Dream With Me In Concert. The program was hosted by the album's producer, David Foster. It was the most frequently broadcast of the Great Performances series in 2011, and Evancho was the youngest soloist ever on the series.

At each tour stop, Evancho sang generally 11 songs from Dream With Me after a brief rehearsal with a local orchestra on the day of each performance. The official tour began with the Sun Valley Orchestra on July 31, 2011, where one critic wrote: "If you've ever wondered what an angel sounds like, you got your answer Sunday evening ... pure, joyous, unaffected notes". This was followed by performances in Atlanta, at the Ravinia Festival (with Conrad Tao as pianist), in Omaha, Dallas, and with her hometown Pittsburgh Opera on October 16, 2011. Conductor Antony Walker took the opportunity to introduce her fans to the Pittsburgh Opera's chorus and soloists, who performed several numbers from Verdi, Bizet and Puccini along with Evancho's repertoire. Evancho made her New York City solo concert debut at Avery Fisher Hall in Lincoln Center on November 7, 2011. The tour was then interrupted by three concerts, described below, to promote Evancho's album Heavenly Christmas. The last appearance in 2011 was in Las Vegas on December 29, 2011, where Evancho headlined a concert with David Foster and Kenny G, featuring mostly songs from Dream With Me, but also a few Christmas songs.

After a solo concert in Tokyo on January 13, 2012, at the Bunkamura concert hall with the Tokyo Philharmonic Orchestra, featuring songs mostly from Dream With Me, Evancho resumed her Dream With Me Tour in the US on January 28, 2012, at the Fantasy Springs Resort Casino, in California. Beginning with this appearance, Evancho's solo concert performances were conducted by John Mario Di Costanzo, and her duet partner was tenor Josh Page, who sang two or three solos to help break up Evancho's set and duetted with her in "The Prayer". During the tour, she generally travelled with her mother and sister Juliet. The next six tour stops were in California and Utah. The young soloist's contract with Fresno Grand Opera contained the unusual requirement that the Saroyan Theatre "provide colored pencils in her dressing room." Evancho's three February tour stops were ranked the tenth top-grossing tour by Billboard for the relevant week. In June 2012, she concluded the tour with performances in Alpharetta, Georgia and Newark, New Jersey, with the New Jersey Symphony Orchestra.

=== Reaction ===
In reviewing her Pittsburgh Opera concert, the Pittsburgh Tribune-Review called her voice "beautifully in tune and well supported. ... Evancho's sincerity of delivery was affecting". A reviewer from The New York Times wrote of her 2011 Avery Fisher Hall concert that "In the first half of the show Ms. Evancho often receded, but toward the end of the night she found purpose, delivering 'A Time for Us' with punch, and closing out Sarah McLachlan's 'Angel' with what felt like real yearning, while the orchestra mostly stayed out of her way."

In an interview prior to their joint Las Vegas concert in December 2011, David Foster said of Evancho: "People just love her. She's carrying the whole show herself, she's so professional. ... I don’t want to say I’m riding her coattails, but she's very comfortable doing it on her own. ... I’ve never seen anything like it ever. ... She's phenomenal." Robin Leach, writing for the Las Vegas Sun, commented on that concert: "Jackie was beyond brilliant!" A San Francisco Chronicle review of Evancho's 2012 concert in San Francisco judged her singing "an impressive thing to witness, and Evancho's technical precision and enormous range only serve to make it seem less fluky. The girl can sing"; but the reviewer felt that "every selection sounded alike".

=== Tour dates ===
Date	City	Country	Venue	Accompaniment	Attendance	Revenue
July 31, 2011	Sun Valley	United States	Sun Valley Pavilion	Sun Valley Orchestra	—N/a	—N/a
August 5, 2011	Atlanta	United States	Atlanta Symphony Hall	Atlanta Symphony Orchestra	—N/a	—N/a
August 7, 2011	Highland Park	United States	Ravinia Pavilion	Ravinia Festival Orchestra	—N/a	—N/a
August 26, 2011	Omaha	United States	Peter Kiewit Concert Hall	Omaha Symphony Orchestra	—N/a	—N/a
August 31, 2011	Dallas	United States	Eugene McDermott Concert Hall	Dallas Symphony Orchestra	—N/a	—N/a
October 16, 2011	Pittsburgh	United States	Benedum Center	Pittsburgh Opera Orchestra	—N/a	—N/a
November 7, 2011	New York City	United States	Avery Fisher Hall	§	—N/a	—N/a
December 29, 2011	Las Vegas	United States	Mandalay Bay Events Center	David Foster's orchestra	—N/a	—N/a
January 13, 2012	Tokyo	Japan	Bunkamura Orchard Hall	Tokyo Philharmonic Orchestra	—N/a	—N/a
January 28, 2012	Indio	United States	Fantasy Springs Special Events Center	§	2,996 / 3,449	$222,929
February 22, 2012	San Diego	United States	Copley Symphony Hall	San Diego Symphony	1,604 / 2,101	$139,640
February 24, 2012	Los Angeles	United States	Nokia Theatre L.A. Live	§	2,250 / 3,159	$157,252
February 26, 2012	Fresno	United States	William Saroyan Theatre	Fresno Grand Opera Orchestra	2,148 / 2,307	$202,650
March 26, 2012	San Francisco	United States	Louise M. Davies Symphony Hall	§	2,175 / 2,639	$198,453
March 28, 2012	Sacramento	United States	Community Center Theater	§	2,134 / 2,360	$203,867
March 31, 2012	West Valley City	United States	Maverik Center	§	1,809 / 2,016	$129,772
June 3, 2012	Alpharetta	United States	Verizon Wireless Amphitheatre	Atlanta Symphony Orchestra	—N/a	—N/a
June 8, 2012	Newark	United States	Prudential Hall	N.J. Symphony Orchestra	1,619 / 2,528	$137,937
Total					16,735 / 20,559 (81%)	$1,392,500

§ Indicates that the orchestra was specially arranged for this concert.

== Heavenly Christmas concerts ==
Heavenly Christmas Tour
- Tour by Jackie Evancho
- Location: United States
- Associated album: Heavenly Christmas
- Start date: December 15, 2011
- End date: December 20, 2011
- No. of shows: 3

To promote her 2011 Christmas album, Heavenly Christmas, Evancho gave three concerts, each with a locally arranged orchestra. Evancho sang approximately 14 songs in each of these appearances, including songs from Prelude to a Dream, Dream with Me and Heavenly Christmas, mixing Christmas music with her classical crossover repertoire. On this mini-tour, then-20-year-old Canadian tenor Christopher Dallo, who had beaten Evancho in the 2009 David Foster talent search contest, sang three solos in between Evancho's sets and duetted with her in "The Prayer".

Date	City	State	Venue	Attendance	Revenue
December 15, 2011	Buffalo	New York	Shea's Performing Arts Center	1,657 / 2,449	$115,545
December 17, 2011	Atlantic City	New Jersey	Etess Arena	1,308 / 1,951	$106,383
December 20, 2011	Pittsburgh	Pennsylvania	Benedum Center	2,248 / 2,748	$185,222
Total				5,213 / 7,148 (73%)	$407,150

Evancho also included a few songs from Heavenly Christmas in her December 29, 2011 Las Vegas concert with David Foster, her Tokyo, Japan concert on January 13, 2012 and in her December 2012 concerts.

== Songs from the Silver Screen Tour ==
Jackie Evancho: Songs from the Silver Screen
- Tour by Jackie Evancho
- Location: Canada; Japan; U.S.
- Associated album: Songs from the Silver Screen
- Start date: August 19, 2012
- End date: August 10, 2014
- No. of shows: 42

Evancho's two-year tour to promote her album Songs from the Silver Screen began on August 19, 2012, at Bunkamura Orchard Hall, near Tokyo, Japan, with the Tokyo Philharmonic Orchestra. Jacob Evancho (now known as Juliet) duetted with her there on the song "I See the Light". On August 25, 2012, she continued the tour with stops in 23 cities in the US and Canada, starting with a performance in Philadelphia, Pennsylvania, at the Mann Center with the Chamber Orchestra of Philadelphia. Other appearances followed in Arizona, Colorado, Texas, California, Georgia, Florida, Minnesota, Illinois, Massachusetts New Jersey, Pennsylvania, Canada, Nevada, Rhode Island, Maryland, Florida and Ohio, ending in Lewiston, New York in June 2013.

A second leg of the tour included a dozen stops from October 2013 to January 2014, three additional performances from April to June 2014 and three more in August 2014. It began with a stop in Massachusetts, followed by eight stops in California, Oregon and Washington, two concerts in Florida and one in Arizona. The next three concerts were in Michigan, Wisconsin and Indiana, and the last three stops were in the northeastern US.

At each tour stop, Evancho sang generally 13 songs, mostly from Songs from the Silver Screen, mixed with songs from her earlier recordings, particularly Dream With Me. As with previous tours, she usually rehearsed briefly with the local orchestra on the day of each performance. In the first leg of the tour, trumpeter Jumaane Smith, who appeared with Evancho in her 2012 PBS special, Music of the Movies, accompanied her in "The Summer Knows", from Summer of 42, and played two solos to break up her sets. In the second leg of the tour, Evancho had no duet partner, and breaks were provided by orchestra selections. The conductor for both legs of the tour was John Mario Di Costanzo. Evancho's mother accompanied her on the tour.

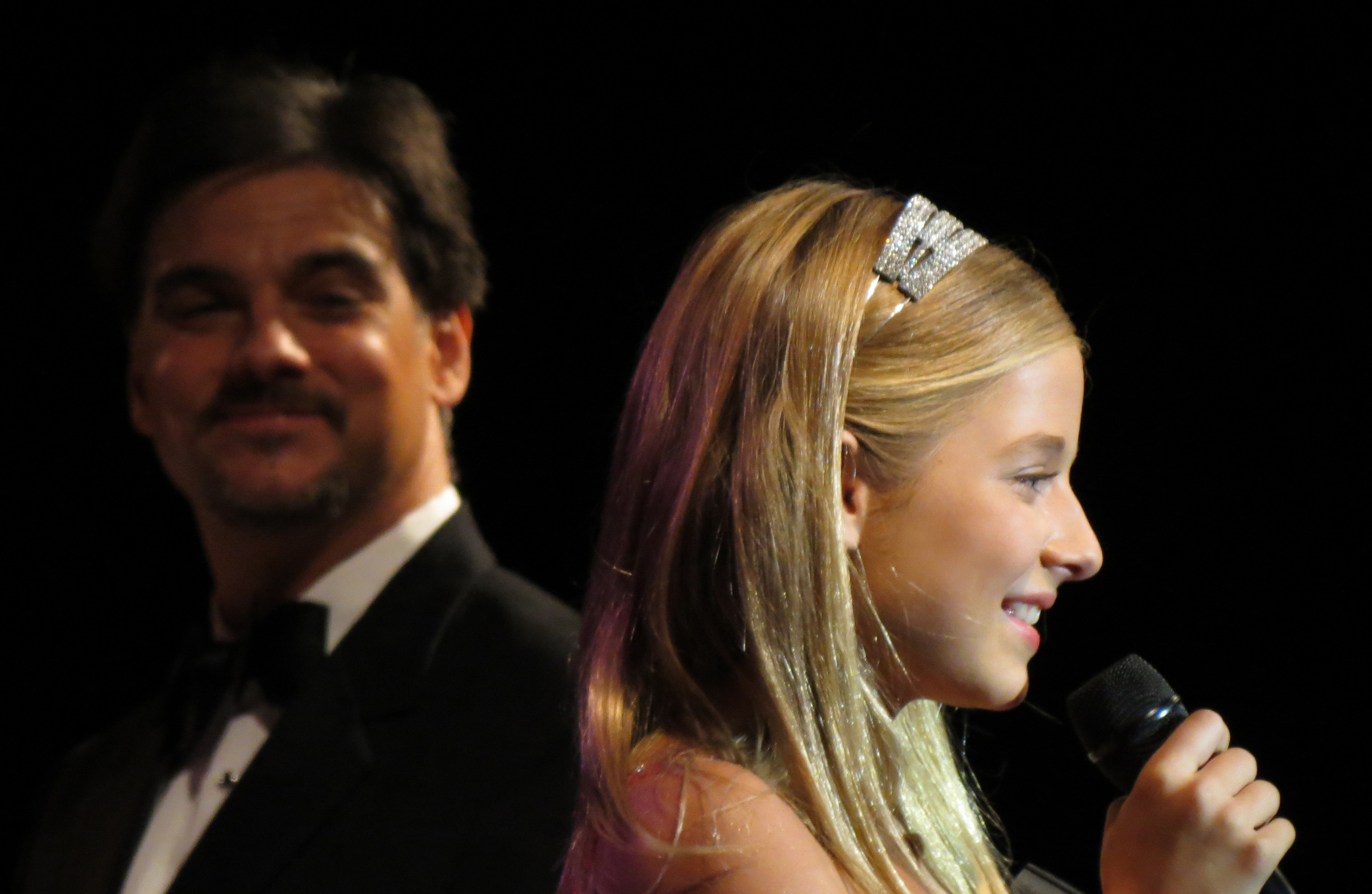
Evancho with 2012–2014 tour conductor, John Mario Di Costanzo

Evancho's second PBS Great Performances concert special, called Jackie Evancho: Music of the Movies, began to air on PBS stations in August 2012, before the tour began. The special features nearly the same selections as Songs from the Silver Screen. A DVD version of the program was distributed as a pledge gift by PBS and was included as part of the deluxe set of Songs from the Silver Screen from Target stores. A TV Worth Watching reviewer stated, "From a Willy Wonka number ('Pure Imagination'), to Phantom of the Opera's almost-epic 'Music of the Night,' the young singer has it all under control." The special continued to be broadcast by PBS stations in 2013.

=== Reaction ===
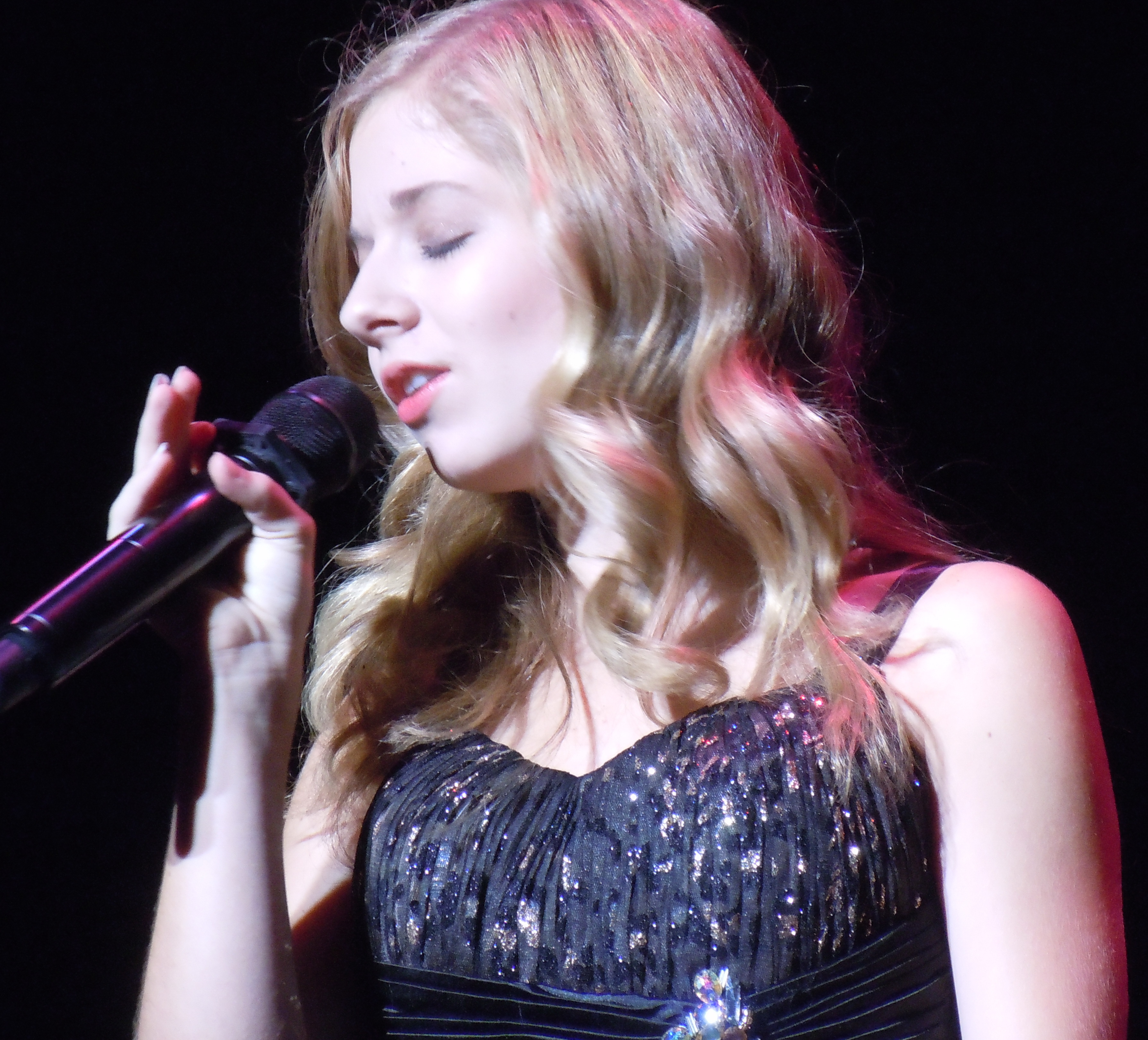
Evancho in November 2013

A reviewer at Evancho's Denver concert noted the audience's enthusiasm and wrote that she "displayed her famous combo of poise and articulation". But he noted "the burden of being a kid soprano, a true phenomenon. People pay a lot to see you and orchestras line up to get you on their stage. But still folks wonder if you really comprehend your life; if you shouldn’t be home … eating ice cream instead of in Denver. ... And yet they rise to their feet, yet again, as you finish." The reviewer for Naples Daily News gave Evancho an unqualified rave: "Her poise. Her control. Her range. … Her voice and her performance exhausted all of the superlatives in the dictionary." At her Baltimore stop: "Her pure and well-formed vowel sounds touched the hearts of everyone at the concert. Every year her voice seems to get better and better. Evancho clearly wished upon a star and asked for a beautiful singing voice." She "got a standing ovation at Miami's Adrienne Arsht Center for the Performing Arts, where she displayed her stunningly mature vocal power, phrasing and range."

=== Tour dates ===
Date	City	Country	Venue	Accompaniment
August 19, 2012	Tokyo	Japan	Bunkamura Orchard Hall	Tokyo Philharmonic Orchestra
August 25, 2012	Philadelphia	United States	Mann Center for the Performing Arts	Chamber Orchestra of Philadelphia
September 15, 2012	Puyallup	United States	Puyallup Fair	Tacoma Symphony Orchestra
November 3, 2012	Scottsdale	United States	Talking Stick Resort Ballroom	§
November 5, 2012	Denver	United States	Boettcher Concert Hall	Colorado Symphony Orchestra
November 14, 2012	Grand Prairie	United States	Verizon Theatre at Grand Prairie	Dallas Pops
November 16, 2012	Palm Desert	United States	McCallum Theatre	§
November 25, 2012	Atlanta	United States	Atlanta Symphony Hall	Atlanta Symphony Orchestra
December 10, 2012	Naples	United States	Hayes Hall	Naples Philharmonic Orchestra
December 12, 2012	West Palm Beach	United States	Dreyfoos Hall	§
December 15, 2012	Santa Barbara	United States	Granada Theatre	§
December 17, 2012	Costa Mesa	United States	Renée & Henry Segerstrom Concert Hall	§
January 22, 2013	Minneapolis	United States	State Theatre	§
January 24, 2013	Chicago	United States	Symphony Center	§
February 1, 2013	Boston	United States	Wang Theatre	§
February 16, 2013	Atlantic City	United States	Revel Ovation Hall	§
March 12, 2013	Pittsburgh	United States	Heinz Hall	Pittsburgh Symphony Orchestra
March 14, 2013	Toronto	Canada	Roy Thomson Hall	§
April 13, 2013	Las Vegas	United States	Reynolds Hall	§
May 9, 2013	Providence	United States	Providence Performing Arts Center	Rhode Island Philharmonic Orchestra
May 18, 2013	Baltimore	United States	Meyerhoff Symphony Hall	Baltimore Symphony Orchestra
June 2, 2013	St. Petersburg	United States	Mahaffey Theater	§
June 7, 2013	Cleveland	United States	Palace Theatre at Playhouse Square	§
June 28, 2013	Lewiston	United States	Artpark Amphitheater	§
October 11, 2013	Worcester	United States	Hanover Theatre	§
November 8, 2013	Cupertino	United States	Flint Center	Symphony Silicon Valley
November 15, 2013	San Rafael	United States	Marin Veterans Memorial Auditorium	Marin Symphony
November 21, 2013	Thousand Oaks	United States	Kavli Theatre	Thousand Oaks Philharmonic
November 23, 2013	Turlock	United States	Turlock Community Theater	§
November 30, 2013	Portland	United States	Arlene Schnitzer Concert Hall	Oregon Symphony
December 7, 2013	Long Beach	United States	Terrace Theater	Long Beach Symphony Orchestra
December 12, 2013	Seattle	United States	Paramount Theatre	Central Washington University Orchestra
December 14, 2013	Indio	United States	Fantasy Springs Special Events Center	§
January 3, 2014	Miami	United States	Knight Concert Hall	§
January 5, 2014	Melbourne	United States	Maxwell C. King Center	§
January 18, 2014	Phoenix	United States	Celebrity Theatre	§
April 13, 2014	Detroit	United States	Fox Theatre	§
May 30, 2014	Milwaukee	United States	Pabst Theater	§
June 1, 2014	Carmel	United States	The Palladium Theatre	§
August 6, 2014	Portsmouth	United States	The Music Hall	Parma Orchestra
August 8, 2014	Chautauqua	United States	Chautauqua Amphitheatre	Chautauqua Symphony Orchestra
August 10, 2014	Lancaster	United States	American Music Theatre	§

§ Indicates that the orchestra was specially arranged for this concert.

== Awakening Tour ==
Jackie Evancho: Awakening
- Tour by Jackie Evancho
- Location: Canada; Costa Rica; U.S.
- Associated album: Awakening
- Start date: November 22, 2014
- End date: April 28, 2016
- No. of shows: 36

Evancho's concert tour to promote her album Awakening began in November 2014. Before the tour began, Evancho filmed her third PBS concert special at Longwood Gardens in Pennsylvania before a live audience, which included all of the songs from Awakening. The special began airing on PBS stations in November 2014. For this tour, at most venues, Evancho useds pre-recorded accompaniment enhanced by approximately a dozen live musicians, normally led from the piano by music director Peter Kiesewalter. At some of the tour stops, as noted below, musicians from existing orchestras were used, while at most venues, the musicians were locally assembled. On this tour, Evancho's father traveled with her more often than her mother.

The tour began with stops in New Jersey and Costa Rica in late 2014. In 2015, stops were in California, Arizona, Nevada, Pennsylvania, Georgia, South Carolina, Florida, Virginia, Tennessee, Connecticut, Maryland, Oregon, Massachusetts, Indiana, Kentucky, Colorado, Michigan and Ontario, Canada. The first two stops in 2016 were in Florida, with another concert in Texas and the last one in New Jersey in April 2016. The concert selections "feature[d] the lush classical-crossover compositions for which [Evancho] has become known, as well as the more contemporary material" on Awakening. Robin Leach reviewed Evancho's January 2015 concert in Las Vegas, writing: "She's still got the voice of an angel. It's remarkable, and her power is growing as she grows up. [She] had the audience on its feet with wild applause at the end of every song … from her new and past albums." Evancho received further warm reviews on the tour.

=== Tour dates ===
Date	City	Country	Venue	Accompaniment
November 22, 2014	Morristown	United States	Mayo Performing Arts Center	§
November 24, 2014	Escazú	Costa Rica	Real Intercontinental Hotel	Philharmonic Orchestra of Costa Rica
January 16, 2015	Palm Desert	United States	McCallum Theatre	§
January 18, 2015	Phoenix	United States	Celebrity Theatre	§
January 29, 2015	Los Angeles	United States	Club Nokia	§
January 31, 2015	Las Vegas	United States	Reynolds Hall	§
February 13, 2015	Pittsburgh	United States	Heinz Hall	Pittsburgh Symphony Orchestra
February 20, 2015	Atlanta	United States	Atlanta Symphony Hall	Atlanta Symphony Orchestra
February 22, 2015	Greenville	United States	Peace Concert Hall	Greenville Symphony Orchestra
March 22, 2015	Jacksonville	United States	Florida Theatre	§
March 24, 2015	Sarasota	United States	Van Wezel Hall	§
March 26, 2015	Clearwater	United States	Ruth Eckerd Hall	§
March 29, 2015	Fort Lauderdale	United States	Au-Rene Theater	§
April 17, 2015	Red Bank	United States	Count Basie Theatre	§
April 23, 2015	Shippensburg	United States	Grove Theatre	§
May 16, 2015	Norfolk	United States	Chrysler Hall	§
June 17, 2015	Nashville	United States	Laura Turner Concert Hall	Nashville Symphony Orchestra
July 25, 2015	Orkney Springs	United States	Shenandoah Valley Music Festival	Fairfax Symphony Orchestra
September 17, 2015	Glenside	United States	Keswick Theatre	Chamber Orchestra of Philadelphia
September 19, 2015	Hartford	United States	Belding Theater	Hartford Symphony Orchestra
September 27, 2015	Easton	United States	State Theatre	§
October 10, 2015	Bethesda	United States	The Music Center at Strathmore	Maryland Classic Youth Orchestras
October 16, 2015	Portland	United States	Newmark Theatre	§ with Special Guest Peter Hollens
October 23, 2015	Boston	United States	Symphony Hall	§
November 20, 2015	Wabash	United States	Ford Theater	§
November 21, 2015	Lancaster	United States	Lancaster Grand Theatre	University of Kentucky Orchestra
December 5, 2015	Toronto	Canada	Queen Elizabeth Theatre	§
December 10, 2015	Tucson	United States	Fox Tucson Theatre	§
December 12, 2015	Santa Barbara	United States	Granada Theatre	§
December 15, 2015	Denver	United States	Boettcher Concert Hall	Colorado Symphony Orchestra
December 18, 2015	New Buffalo	United States	Silver Creek Event Center	§
December 19, 2015	Kalamazoo	United States	Chenery Auditorium	Kalamazoo Symphony Orchestra
January 16, 2016	Lakeland	United States	Youkey Theater	§
January 17, 2016	Melbourne	United States	Maxwell C. King Center	§
March 19, 2016	Midland	United States	Wagner Noël Performing Arts Center	§
April 28, 2016	Morristown	United States	Mayo Performing Arts Center	New Jersey Festival Orchestra

§On this tour, Evancho usually appeared with her orchestra leader, Peter Kiesewalter, at the piano, and a dozen locally assembled string players who added to pre-recorded backing tracks. Where an orchestra is named, members of that orchestra were used. In Pittsburgh, Nashville, Denver and Kalamazoo, larger ensembles with other conductors were used.

== Live in Concert Tour (2016–2017) ==
Jackie Evancho: Live in Concert
- National tour by Jackie Evancho
- Location: United States
- Start date: October 6, 2016
- End date: March 24, 2017
- No. of shows: 23

Evancho gave a US concert tour from October 2016 to March 2017. Stops in 2016 included venues in Illinois, Indiana, Ohio, South Carolina (with special guest Chris Mann), New Jersey, New York, Rhode Island, Kentucky and Florida. Stops in 2017 included venues in Texas, California, Florida, Pennsylvania and Washington. Evancho promoted the tour with a YouTube video released in September 2016.

At the first concerts of the tour, Evancho performed a mix of songs from her earlier albums, songs she had recently released as singles (some which appear on her 2017 album Two Hearts), and covers of standards. At the concerts closer to Christmas, in addition to those selections, she included several holiday songs, including some from her 2016 holiday album Someday at Christmas. Later concerts in this tour included additional songs from Two Hearts.

Reviewing her holiday show in Troy, New York, Steve Barnes of the Times Union noted that Evancho performed more than 20 numbers, including four holiday songs. He wrote that her voice is "an instrument of pristine beauty. It peals with the purity of bells and lofts tones that shimmer with celestial iridescence" but that her performance lacks "an apparent interpretive style or emotional connection to the material". Kirk Stauffer wrote for Back Beat Seattle that, at The Triple Door, Evancho "had a mature stage presence and shared personal experiences between songs. ... The evening ended with a well-deserved standing ovation.

=== Tour dates ===
Date	City	State	Venue	Accompaniment
October 6, 2016	St. Charles	Illinois	Arcada Theatre	§
October 7, 2016	Merrillville	Indiana	Star Plaza Theatre	§
October 8, 2016	Cleveland	Ohio	Mimi Ohio Theatre	§
November 12, 2016	Charleston	South Carolina	Rivers Performance Hall	°
November 25, 2016	Red Bank	New Jersey	Count Basie Theatre	§
November 26, 2016	Troy	New York	Savings Bank Music Hall	§
November 27, 2016	Providence	Rhode Island	Veterans Memorial Auditorium	§
December 17, 2016	Paducah	Kentucky	Luther F. Carson Four Rivers Center	Kiesewalter and Paducah Symphony
December 18, 2016	Louisville	Kentucky	Brown Theatre	§
December 20, 2016	Clearwater	Florida	Ruth Eckerd Hall	§
December 21, 2016	Jacksonville	Florida	Florida Theatre	§
January 21, 2017	Tyler	Texas	Cowan Center for the Arts	°
February 10, 2017	Campbell	California	Heritage Theatre	°
February 11, 2017	Palm Desert	California	McCallum Theatre	°
February 12, 2017	Cerritos	California	Cerritos Center	°
February 25, 2017	Coral Springs	Florida	Coral Springs Center for the Arts	°
February 26, 2017	Fort Myers	Florida	Barbara B. Mann Performing Arts Hall	°
February 27, 2017	Sarasota	Florida	Van Wezel Hall	°
March 5, 2017	Pittsburgh	Pennsylvania	Benedum Center	°
March 23, 2017	Seattle	Washington	The Triple Door	§ Two shows each evening
March 24, 2017	Seattle	Washington	The Triple Door	§ Two shows each evening

§ Evancho was accompanied by Kiesewalter at the piano and synthesizer, and pre-recorded backing tracks.
°Evancho was accompanied by Kiesewalter at the piano and synthesizer, pre-recorded backing tracks and several live string players.

== Two Hearts tour (2017–2019) ==
Two Hearts tour
- National tour by Jackie Evancho
- Location: United States
- Associated album: Two Hearts
- Start date: May 19, 2017
- End date: April 6, 2019
- No. of shows: 38

Evancho gave this nationwide concert tour to promote her seventh studio album Two Hearts. Her 2016 holiday album, Someday at Christmas, was Evancho's last commitment to Sony, but after her January 2017 performance of the US national anthem at the presidential inauguration of Donald Trump, she experienced a bump in her album sales. She received new offers from several labels and soon signed a new record deal with Sony, after which she released Two Hearts, on March 31, 2017, on Sony's Portrait label. The album includes a classical crossover disc and an EP disc of five pop songs, four of which Evancho co-wrote. The release was Evancho's first that included her own songwriting (other than her contribution in 2010 to the lyrics of the title song of Dream With Me). Fanai and Holley returned as producers and co-writers, with Evancho, of the four songs on the EP.

Evancho sang a few of the songs from Two Hearts towards the end of her 2016–2017 Live in Concert Tour. In March 2017, Evancho released a music video of one of the songs from the album, "Attesa". In April, she began television promotions for the album with a performance on the Today Show, appearances on NBC's New York Live and ABC's The View, and ten performances at Café Carlyle in New York City, where she was the youngest artist ever to ever perform at the venue. The same month, she released a music video of another song from the album, "Pedestal".

On May 19, 2017, Evancho began a US tour to promote Two Hearts. The tour had stops in Illinois, Indiana, Michigan, California, Texas, Pennsylvania and Maryland in 2017. The tour resumed in 2018 with stops in California, Ohio, Washington, Oregon, Idaho, New Jersey and Pennsylvania. Kiesewalter continued as her musical director. Evancho's set list for the tour included songs from Two Hearts ("The Way We Were", "May It Be", "Caruso", "Safe & Sound", "Pedestal" and "How Great Thou Art"), together with songs from her previous albums, and a few songs that she has sung in previous concerts but had not yet included in her albums. As in previous years, Evancho also included Christmas songs in the set list of her November and December concerts. She made stops in Arizona, California, Texas, Massachusetts, New Jersey, Pennsylvania, Florida and Illinois at the end of the tour in early 2019.

=== Tour dates ===
Date	City	State	Venue	Accompaniment
May 19, 2017	Waukegan	Illinois	Genesee Theatre	§
May 20, 2017	Carmel	Indiana	The Palladium Theatre	§
June 7, 2017	Midlands	Michigan	Midland Center for the Arts	§
September 8, 2017	Redondo Beach	California	Redondo Beach Performing Arts Center	°
September 9, 2017	Napa	California	Uptown Theater	°
November 3, 2017	Lake Jackson	Texas	The Clarion at Brazosport College	§
November 4, 2017	Spring	Texas	Klein Cain High School Auditorium	§
November 29, 2017	Easton	Pennsylvania	State Theatre	§
December 1, 2017	Greensburg	Pennsylvania	The Palace Theatre	§
December 2, 2017	Glenside	Pennsylvania	Keswick Theatre	Chamber Orchestra of Philadelphia
December 3, 2017	Baltimore	Maryland	Modell Performing Arts Center	§
April 19, 2018	Modesto	California	Mary Stuart Rogers Theater	§
April 27, 2018	Dayton	Ohio	Mead Theatre	Dayton Philharmonic Orchestra
April 28, 2018	Dayton	Ohio	Mead Theatre	Dayton Philharmonic Orchestra
June 2, 2018	Seattle	Washington	Admiral Theatre	§
June 3, 2018	Salem	Oregon	Elsinore Theatre	°
June 4, 2018	Redding	California	Redding Civic Auditorium	°
June 6, 2018	Folsom	California	Harris Center	°
June 7, 2018	Folsom	California	Harris Center	°
June 9, 2018	Spokane	Washington	Martin Woldson Theater	°
June 10, 2018	Boise	Idaho	Morrison Center	°
July 29, 2018	Ocean City	New Jersey	Ocean City Music Pier	Ocean City POPS
October 19, 2018	Vacaville	California	Vacaville Performing Arts Theater	§
November 2, 2018	Uniontown	Pennsylvania	State Theatre Center for the Arts	§
November 24, 2018	Ocean City	New Jersey	Ocean City Music Pier	§
December 12, 2018	New Wilmington	Pennsylvania	Orr Auditorium	§
December 14, 2018	Costa Mesa	California	Renée & Henry Segerstrom Concert Hall	Pacific Symphony
December 15, 2018	Costa Mesa	California	Renée & Henry Segerstrom Concert Hall	Pacific Symphony
January 10, 2019	Tucson	Arizona	Fox Tucson Theatre	§
January 11, 2019	Palm Desert	California	McCallum Theatre	§
February 1, 2019	Lufkin	Texas	Temple Theatre	§
February 22, 2019	Beverly	Massachusetts	Cabot Theatre	§
February 23, 2019	Morristown	New Jersey	Mayo Performing Arts Center	§
February 24, 2019	Lancaster	Pennsylvania	American Music Theatre	§
March 14, 2019	Coral Springs	Florida	Coral Springs Center for the Arts	§
March 15, 2019	Fort Myers	Florida	Barbara B. Mann Performing Arts Hall	§
March 16, 2019	Clearwater	Florida	Bilheimer Capitol Theatre	§
April 6, 2019	Waukegan	Illinois	Genesee Theatre	§

§Evancho was accompanied by Kiesewalter at the piano and synthesizer, pre-recorded backing tracks and several live string players.
°Evancho was accompanied by Kiesewalter at the piano and synthesizer, and pre-recorded backing tracks.

== The Debut tour (2019–2020; 2022) ==
The Debut tour
- National tour by Jackie Evancho
- Location: United States
- Associated album: The Debut
- Start date: April 23, 2019
- End date: July 24, 2022
- No. of shows: 21

In April 2019, Evancho released her eighth studio album, The Debut. The album includes songs from Broadway shows and movies mostly of the 21st century. Evancho began to include some of the songs from The Debut towards the end of her 2017–2019 Two Hearts Tour.

On April 23, 2019, Evancho began a US tour to promote The Debut with a concert at Feinstein's/54 Below in New York City. The tour continued in 2019 and early 2020, with stops in Pennsylvania, New York, California, Nevada, Ohio, Indiana, New Jersey, Massachusetts, Utah and Colorado. Concerts scheduled after February 2020 were cancelled due to the COVID-19 pandemic.

The tour resumed in 2022 with stops in California, Florida and New Jersey. Evancho also promoted the album on various media, including Yahoo! Finance and Good Morning America, often singing "Burn" from Hamilton. On this tour, except as noted below, Evancho was accompanied by a small ensemble led from the piano by music director Jorn Swart. A reviewer for New Jersey Stage wrote of her December 13, 2019 concert, that "Evancho sings with feeling. [Her] voice floats out over the audience … with precision and grace, her runs and tone spot on".

=== Tour dates ===
Date	City	State	Venue	Accompaniment
April 23, 2019	New York City	New York	Feinstein's/54 Below	
May 31, 2019	Pittsburgh	Pennsylvania	Byham Theater	
June 11, 2019	New York City	New York	Feinstein's/54 Below	
October 6, 2019	Thousand Oaks	California	Fred Kavli Theatre	
October 12, 2019	Stateline	Nevada	South Shore Room at Harrah's	
October 13, 2019	Las Vegas	Nevada	Reynolds Hall	
November 1, 2019	San Jose	California	San Jose Civic	
November 2, 2019	Cerritos	California	Cerritos Center	
November 22, 2019	Lima	Ohio	Crouse Performance Hall	Lima Symphony Orchestra
November 23, 2019	Wabash	Indiana	Honeywell Center	
December 13, 2019	Newton	New Jersey	The Newton Theatre	
December 14, 2019	Millville	New Jersey	Levoy Theatre	
December 15, 2019	Lexington	Massachusetts	Cary Memorial Hall	
February 27, 2020	Salt Lake City	Utah	Delta Performance Hall	
February 28, 2020	Parker	Colorado	Parker Center (PACE)	
February 29, 2020	Colorado Springs	Colorado	Pikes Peak Center	
March 4, 2022	Palm Desert	California	McCallum Theatre	
March 22, 2022	Fort Lauderdale	Florida	Parker Playhouse	
March 23, 2022	Clearwater	Florida	Bilheimer Capitol Theatre	
March 25, 2022	The Villages	Florida	Sharon L. Morse Performing Arts Center	
July 24, 2022	Ocean City	New Jersey	Ocean City Music Pier	Ocean City POPS
