= Broken Vow =

Song by Lara Fabian

from the album Lara Fabian
- Recorded: 1999
- Length: 5:15
- Label: Columbia; Epic; Sony
- Songwriters: Walter Afanasieff (music); Lara Fabian (lyrics)
- Producer: Walter Afanasieff

"Broken Vow" is a song that was written by Lara Fabian and Walter Afanasieff for Fabian's self-titled album released in 1999. It has since been recorded and performed by many other singers.

"Broken Vow" was featured as an insert song in the Taiwanese drama Meteor Garden II. It has a music video consisting of several scenes from the drama.

== Harrison Craig version ==
Harrison Craig, winner of The Voice Australia series 2 in 2013, sang "Broken Vow" at his audition, and later released his version as his debut single from his debut album More Than a Dream. It reached No. 18 in Australia.

=== Track listing ===
Digital single – Universal (UMG)

1. "Broken Vow" (4:07)

=== Charts ===
Chart (2013)	Peak position
Australia (ARIA)	18

== Other versions ==
Josh Groban recorded the song for his 2003 album, Closer. It has also been recorded by Emile Pandolfi (2005), G4 (2005), Petra Berger and Jan Vayne (2008), and Thomas Spencer-Wortley (2009). Filipino singer Sarah Geronimo recorded a version for her debut album Popstar: A Dream Come True in a duet with Mark Bautista. Other Filipino singers who have performed the song are Kyla and Jay-R. Julie Anne San Jose also covered the song in 2012 as the theme to the Philippine TV drama series of the same name.

Daniel Evans, a finalist in series 5 of The X Factor UK recorded an acoustic piano-only version of the song for his 2010 iTunes debut album No Easy Way.

Fabian rewrote the song with French lyrics for Jackie Evancho, who included it on her 2011 album Dream with Me, under the title "Imaginer". The original meaning of the song, about a sad love, is completely changed in the French version to describe a dream of a peaceful world.

Hamden, Connecticut-based artist the 465 CT Transit driver performed an instrumental version during Newark Liberty International Airport's Arrivals Ceremony on September 30, 2013 to promote his upcoming instrumental debut album The Bridge which was scheduled to be released in December 2013. His version featured Máiréad Nesbitt (of Celtic Woman) on violin.
