= Ave Maria (Vavilov) =

Concert aria by Vladimir Vavilov

"Ave Maria" is a concert aria composed by Vladimir Vavilov around 1970 and often misattributed to Italian composer Giulio Caccini. Vavilov published and recorded it himself in 1970 on the Melodiya label with the ascription "Anonymous".

It is believed that organist Mark Shakhin, one of the performers on the original LP, first ascribed the work to Caccini after Vavilov's death, and gave the "newly-discovered" scores to other musicians. However, because Mark Shakhin died in 1970, predating Vladimir Vavilov's death, it is impossible that Shakhin was the one who disseminated the claim that this "Ave Maria" was Caccini's composition after Vavilov had died.

The organist Oleg Yanchenko then made an arrangement of the aria for a recording by Irina Arkhipova in 1987, after which the piece came to be famous worldwide.

== Selected recordings ==
- 1970 – Vladimir Vavilov and Nadezhda Vainer, on the album Lute music of the 16th and 17th centuries, Melodiya, anonymous composer

The composer Vladimir Vavilov died in 1973.

- 1975 – Irina Bogacheva, on the album Старинные Арии, Melodiya, composed by Giulio Caccini
- 1979 – Ilga Tiknuse, on the album Rietumeiropas Klasika, Melodiya
- 1988 – Irina Arkhipova, arranged by Oleg Yanchenko, on the album Ave Maria, Melodiya
- 1990 – Lusine Zakaryan and Levon Abramyan, on the album Ave Maria, Melodiya
- 1991 – Lina Mkrtchyan, on the album ...And Life Of Future Century...

Vavilov's Ave Maria became known internationally after the dissolution of the Soviet Union at the end of 1991. Before its collapse, there was limited cultural exchange between the Soviet Union and the rest of the world.

- 1993 – Vyatcheslav Kagan-Paley, on the album Ave Maria
- 1994 – Inese Galante, arranged for organ, on the live album Musica Sacra, Campion
- 1995 – Inese Galante, arranged by Georgs Brīnums, on the album Debut, Campion
- 1997 – Lesley Garrett, arranged by Nick Ingman, on the album A Soprano Inspired
- 1998 – Charlotte Church, arranged by Nick Ingman, on the album Voice of an Angel
- 1998 – Julian Lloyd Webber, on the album Cello Moods
- 1999 – Andrea Bocelli, on the album Sacred Arias
- 2001 – Sumi Jo, arranged by Steven Mercurio, on the album Prayers
- 2003 – Minako Honda, on the album Ave Maria
- 2005 – Hayley Westenra, arranged by Steven Mercurio, on the album Odyssey
- 2008 – Kokia, on the album The Voice
- 2008 – Libera, on the album New Dawn
- 2011 – Patricia Janečková, on the album Patricia Janečková
- 2014 – Jackie Evancho, on the album Awakening
- 2014 – Elīna Garanča, on the album Meditation
- 2015 – Tarja Turunen, on the album Ave Maria – En Plein Air
- 2015 – Amira Willighagen, on the album Merry Christmas
- 2021 – Marina Rebeka, on the album Credo

== Use on film ==
- Donnie Darko (2001)
- Stairway to Heaven (2003)
- Trollywood (2004)
- Our Lady of the Assassins (2000, American release trailer)

== See also ==
- Ave Maria (Bach/Gounod)
- Ave Maria (Schubert)
