= Imaginer =

2011 song by Jackie Evancho

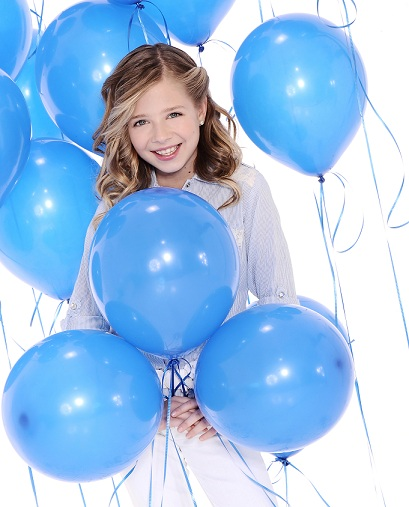
Evancho in early 2011, when she recorded "Imaginer"

"Imaginer" (to imagine) is a French-language song first performed and recorded by American singer Jackie Evancho in 2011. The song uses the music from a 1999 English-language song, "Broken Vow", by Walter Afanasieff and Lara Fabian. The same songwriters wrote the new French lyrics for Evancho, who recorded it on her 2011 gold album Dream With Me, which was recorded when Evancho was 10 years old.

== Lara Fabian: "Broken Vow" ==
The music of "Imagine" was originally written for an English-language song, "Broken Vow", by the record producer and songwriter Walter Afanasieff and the Belgian-Italian, naturalised Canadian international singer Lara Fabian. Fabian recorded it for her first English-language album, Lara Fabian, released in France in 1999. It was subsequently recorded and performed by many other singers.

== New lyrics and 2011 recordings ==
Afanasieff and Fabian wrote the new French lyrics to "Imaginer" especially for Jackie Evancho, for her 2011 album Dream With Me, produced by David Foster, which debuted at No. 2 on the Billboard 200 and No. 1 on the Billboard's US Classical Chart. The album was certified gold by the RIAA. The meaning of "Broken Vow", about a sad love, is completely changed in "Imaginer", which describes a dream of a peaceful world. Part of the lyrics translate as follows: "Imagine a world as pure as the sun, / Where war is only a memory. / Imagine a world without hunger".

Evancho also performed the song in her 2011 PBS Great Performances special Dream With Me In Concert, which was also sold on CD and DVD. On both Dream With Me and Dream With Me In Concert, Conrad Tao played the piano solo in "Imaginer".

== "Imaginer" on tour ==
Evancho included the piece in her 2011–12 Dream With Me tour and her 2012–14 "Songs from the Silver Screen" tour. In The Salt Lake Tribune, reviewer Robert Coleman commented: "Singing in French to Lara Fabian's 'Imaginer' and in Italian for Puccini's 'O mio babbino caro,' Evancho showed her expertise with languages as well as some pretty respectable interpretation."
