= Two Hearts (Jackie Evancho album) =

Studio album by Jackie Evancho
- Released: March 31, 2017
- Studio: Audible Images (Pittsburgh, PA)
- Genre: Classical crossover
- Length: 61:20
- Label: Portrait

Jackie Evancho chronology
Someday at Christmas (2016)	Two Hearts (2017)	The Debut (2019)

Two Hearts is a two-disc studio album by Jackie Evancho, consisting of a classical crossover disc with 10 tracks and a pop music EP with 5 tracks, including four songs on which Evancho has a songwriting credit. The album was released on March 31, 2017, on Sony Masterworks' Portrait Records imprint. Evancho included several songs from the album in her concerts in 2016 and 2017, and she gave ten performances at Café Carlyle in New York City that included songs from the album. She was the youngest artist ever to perform at this venue.

The tracks on Disc 1 include the ballad "Caruso" by Lucio Dalla; "Attesa", arranged from the instrumental Intermezzo in the opera Cavalleria rusticana by Pietro Mascagni; and "How Great Thou Art", an 1885 hymn with words by Carl Boberg, translated by Stuart K. Hine. It also includes the song "Mama" from Il Divo's eponymous 2004 album. Five of the last six songs on the disc are from film soundtracks. The first two of these are "May It Be" from The Lord of the Rings: The Fellowship of the Ring and "The Way We Were", from the 1973 film of the same name. Next is the 2014 song "Have You Ever Been in Love" by Jimmie Linville, followed by two songs that Evancho released as singles in 2016: "Safe & Sound", from The Hunger Games, and "Writing's on the Wall" from Spectre. The disc concludes with "A Thousand Years" from The Twilight Saga: Breaking Dawn – Part 1, sung live as a duet between Evancho and tenor Fernando Varela on his 2017 PBS special. Walmart is offering a special edition that includes three additional songs on Disc 1. Disc 2 consists of five original songs, on four of which Evancho has a writing credit. Evancho released the fifth song, "Apocalypse", by Peter Zizzo and others, as a single in April 2016.

The album debuted at No. 100 on the Billboard 200, and No. 1 on the Billboard Classical Albums chart, Evancho's seventh consecutive release to reach the top of that chart. The album remained on the Billboard Classical Albums chart for 36 weeks.

== Production ==
Evancho began recording music for the album in 2015 and released three of the songs included on the album as singles by early 2016. On Disc 1, production, arrangements and accompaniments are provided by William Joseph, Nick Patrick, David Kahne, Michael Mangini, Peter Zizzo and Chris Craker, among others. The Czech National Symphony Orchestra accompanied tracks 1–3, 5 and 6 (and bonus track 13); Gavin Greenaway conducted a London studio orchestra that accompanies track 10. Evancho's vocals were mostly recorded at Audible Images in Pittsburgh, Pennsylvania.

Disc 2 is Evancho's first release that includes her own songwriting (other than contributions that she made in 2010 to the lyrics of the title song of Dream With Me). Dina Fanai and Heather Holley, who produced Evancho's last album, Someday at Christmas, returned as producers for Disc 2, provided accompaniment, background vocals and co-wrote the first four songs on the disc with Evancho. Robert Kinkel, formerly of the Trans-Siberian Orchestra, who worked with Evancho on Someday at Christmas, also co-wrote one of the album's original songs and played keyboards for several of them. Arrangements and cello accompaniment on the first four songs are by Dave Eggar. Michael Mangini and Peter Zizzo co-wrote, produced and provided accompaniments for track 5.

== Development and promotion ==
On December 16, 2015, Evancho released a single cover of "Safe & Sound", by Taylor Swift. together with a video. On January 29, 2016, she released a single and video covering Sam Smith's "Writing's on the Wall" on her own JE Touring label, telling reporters that she expected the singles to appear on an upcoming album. On April 19, 2016, Evancho released "Apocalypse", an original song by Peter Zizzo, also on the JE Touring label. Billboard wrote that she "has found a brand-new sound. The 16-year-old singer ... is taking a step outside the classical world that made her famous", but Evancho told Billboard: "I'm not going to get rid of my classical voice, because that's my roots, that's what I love the most." She also released a video of the song and performed it on The Today Show and Live! with Kelly and Michael. A reviewer for The New Yorker, found the track "cloying", writing that Evancho "sounds unremarkable outside her genre." On March 29, 2017, Evancho released a music video for "Atessa".

Evancho's 2016 holiday album, Someday at Christmas, was her last commitment to Sony, but after her January 2017 performance of the US national anthem at the presidential inauguration of Donald Trump, she experienced a bump in her album sales. She received new offers from several labels but chose to distribute her new album with Sony.

Evancho included several of the songs from the album in her 2016–2017 US Live in Concert Tour. On March 31, 2017, she released a music video of one of the songs on the album, "Attesa". She began television promotions for the album with a performance of "Caruso" on the Today Show, on April 4, 2017, followed by appearances on NBC's New York Live, and ABC's The View in April 2017. She gave ten performances at Café Carlyle in New York City, from April 11 to 22, which included songs from the album. She was the youngest artist ever to ever perform at this venue. The same month, she released a music video of another song from the album, "Pedestal". Evancho told People magazine that the music-box inspired song is "about breaking free of your childhood image and coming into your own; finding out who you are as an adult." In May 2017, on the same day that she began her Two Hearts tour, Evancho performed "Pedestal" on WGN-TV, Chicago.

== Chart performance ==
The album debuted at No. 100 on the Billboard 200, and No. 1 on the Billboard Classical Albums chart, Evancho's seventh consecutive release to reach the top of that chart.

== Track listing ==
Sources: AllMusic and Portrait

Disc 1
No.	Title	Writer(s)	Length
1.	"Caruso" (featuring William Joseph, piano)	Lucio Dalla (music and lyrics)	4:27
2.	"Attesa" (the instrumental Intermezzo in the opera Cavalleria rusticana)	Pietro Mascagni (music) Chiara Ferraú (lyrics)	4:30
3.	"How Great Thou Art"	German traditional (music) Carl Boberg and Stuart K. Hine (lyrics)	5:18
4.	"Mama"	Andreas Romdhane, Josef Larossi, Savan Kotecha (music and lyrics)	3:24
5.	"May It Be" (from The Lord of the Rings: The Fellowship of the Ring (2001))	Enya (music) Roma Ryan (lyrics)	3:50
6.	"The Way We Were" (from The Way We Were (1973))	Marvin Hamlisch (music) Alan Bergman and Marilyn Bergman (lyrics)	3:27
7.	"Have You Ever Been in Love?"	Jimmie Linville (music and lyrics)	4:06
8.	"Safe & Sound" (from The Hunger Games (2012))	Taylor Swift, Joy Williams, John Paul White and T-Bone Burnett (music and lyrics)	3:42
9.	"Writing's on the Wall" (from Spectre (2015))	Sam Smith and Jimmy Napes (music and lyrics)	3:50
10.	"A Thousand Years" (live; with Fernando Varela; from The Twilight Saga: Breaking Dawn – Part 1 (2011); lyrics in Italian)	Christina Perri and David Hodges (music and lyrics)	5:04
Total length:			41:38

Bonus tracks included only on Disc 1 of the Walmart version of the album
No.	Title	Writer(s)	Length
11.	"Coming Home, Pt. II"	Shawn Carter, Jermaine Cole, Alexander Grant and Holly Hafermann (music and lyrics)	3:10
12.	"Fix You"	Guy Berryman, Jonathan Buckland, William Champion and Christopher Martin (music and lyrics)	4:20
13.	"America the Beautiful"	Samuel Ward (music) Katharine Lee Bates (lyrics) (lyrics)	3:24

Disc 2
No.	Title	Writer(s)	Length
1.	"Sane"	Dina Fanai and Heather Holley (music); Jackie Evancho, Dina Fanai and Heather Holley (lyrics)	3:33
2.	"Pedestal"	Dina Fanai, Heather Holley and Robert Kinkel (music); Jackie Evancho, Dina Fanai and Heather Holley (lyrics)	3:43
3.	"The Haunting"	Dina Fanai and Heather Holley (music); Jackie Evancho, Dina Fanai and Heather Holley (lyrics)	3:59
4.	"Wonderland"	Dina Fanai and Heather Holley (music); Jackie Evancho, Dina Fanai and Heather Holley (lyrics)	4:22
5.	"Apocalypse"	Peter Zizzo, Jillette Johnson, et al. (music and lyrics)	4:05
Total length:			19:42

== Charts ==
=== Weekly charts ===
Chart (2017)	Peak position
US Billboard 200	100
US Top Classical Albums (Billboard)	1

=== Year-end charts ===
Chart (2017)	Position
US Top Classical Albums (Billboard)	9
