= Someday at Christmas (Jackie Evancho album) =

Studio album by Jackie Evancho
- Released: October 28, 2016
- Studios: Spin Studios (New York, NY); Steller Productions (New York, NY); Audible Images (Pittsburgh, PA); Smecky Studios (Prague, Czech Republic); 360 Global Media Studios (Madrid, Spain)
- Genres: Classical crossover; Christmas
- Length: 45:31
- Label: Portrait
- Producers: Dina Fanai; Heather Holley

Jackie Evancho chronology
Awakening (2014)	Someday at Christmas (2016)	Two Hearts (2017)

Someday at Christmas is American singer Jackie Evancho's second full-length Christmas album, and her seventh album overall. It contains 12 tracks and was produced by Nick Patrick for Sony Masterworks' Portrait label. The album was released on October 28, 2016 and consists of nine previously released tracks, including collaborations with Plácido Domingo, Peter Hollens and Vittorio Grigolo, and three new tracks, "Someday at Christmas" and two versions of "The Little Drummer Boy", one with Il Volo.

The title track, "Someday at Christmas", has an anti-war and civil rights theme. It was written by Ron Miller and Bryan Wells and first released as a single by Stevie Wonder in 1966. It reached #24 on the Billboard Christmas singles chart that year. It then became the title track to Wonder's 1967 album, Someday at Christmas, which also shares two other tracks this album: "The Little Drummer Boy" and "The Christmas Song".

The album peaked at No. 93 on the Billboard 200, No. 1 on the Billboard Classical Albums chart and No. 3 on the Billboard Holiday Albums chart.

== Promotion ==
Evancho performed the title track on the Memphis, Tennessee, morning show Local Memphis Live on November 3, 2016. Shortly before the release of the album, she appeared on the cover of the Fall 2016 issue of Inspiring Lives Magazine. The issue contains an interview, "Jackie Evancho: An Opera Angel and a Pop Star". She also performed some of the songs from the album in her 2016 holiday concerts.

Evancho performed "Little Drummer Boy", together with Il Volo, on NBC's Today Show in New York City on December 14, 2016, and the title track on Fox's Good Day Chicago the following day. She sang "Someday at Christmas" on NBC's America's Got Talent Holiday Spectacular on December 19, 2016 and on Harry on December 20.

== Reception ==
The album peaked at No. 93 on the Billboard 200, No. 1 on the Billboard Classical Albums chart and No. 3 on the Billboard Holiday Albums chart. Someday at Christmas was the No. 27 best-selling classical album of Billboard's 2016 year (which ends after November). It remained on the Classical Albums chart for 14 weeks.

A review in Cedar Rapids, Iowa's The Gazette called the album "a shimmering showcase for [Evancho's] incredible vocal range and interests. ... [The] duets in this project display her talents for harmonies, as well as tender melodies." Miriam Di Nunzio wrote in Chicago Sun-Times, "Lush strings, sweeping orchestrations are served well by this 16-year-old songstress. 'Do You Hear What I Hear' is hauntingly beautiful. 'The Christmas Song' is a bit overdramatic, but still likeable. 'Have Yourself a Merry Little Christmas' is gentle and sweeping. Evancho’s voice has matured quite nicely and those piercing high notes that she navigates so effortlessly serve her well on this collection." Randy Lewis of the Los Angeles Times commented that Evancho "shows off a remarkably mature voice on her classically rooted Christmas outing. The music is at its most gorgeously formal in her duets with superstar tenor Placido Domingo, but she also delivers a nicely down-to-earth version of" the title track.

== Track listing ==
No.	Title	Writer(s), arranger(s) and previous release(s)	Length
1.	"Someday at Christmas"	Ronald Miller and Bryan Wells; arranged by Robert Kinkel, Dina Fanai and Heather Holley; string arr: Dave Eggar; produced by Dina Fanai and Heather Holley	4:18
2.	"Do You Hear What I Hear"	Gloria Shayne Baker (music) Noël Regney (lyrics); orchestra arr: Sally Herbert; backing vocals Shelly Poole, (Awakening Deluxe ed. 2014)	4:11
3.	"Guardian Angels" (with Plácido Domingo)	Harpo Marx (music) Gerda Beilenson (lyrics) (Domingo: My Christmas 2015)	3:51
4.	"Little Drummer Boy"	Katherine Kennicott Davis, Henry Onorati and Harry Simeone; arranged by Robert Kinkel and Dina Fanai; produced by Dina Fanai and Heather Holley	3:09
5.	"It Came Upon a Midnight Clear"	Richard Storrs Willis (music) Edmund Sears (lyrics); orchestra arrangement by Sally Herbert; backing vocals Shelly Poole, (Awakening Deluxe ed. 2014)	3:40
6.	"Pie Jesu" (with Plácido Domingo; from Requiem)	Andrew Lloyd Webber (music); Traditional (lyrics) (Domingo: My Christmas 2015)	3:59
7.	"Christmas Waltz"	Jule Styne (music) Sammy Cahn (lyrics); orchestra arrangement by Sally Herbert; backing vocals Shelly Poole, (Awakening Deluxe ed. 2014)	3:26
8.	"Hallelujah" (with Peter Hollens)	Leonard Cohen; arranged by Tom Anderson; produced by Peter Hollens (Peter Hollens 2014)	4:08
9.	"The Christmas Song"	Bob Wells and Mel Tormé (music and lyrics); orchestra arrangement by Sally Herbert; backing vocals Shelly Poole, (Awakening Deluxe ed. 2014)	3:39
10.	"O Holy Night" (featuring Vittorio Grigolo)	Adolphe Adam (music) John Sullivan Dwight (lyrics); arranged by Nick Patrick and William Hayward (Awakening Deluxe ed. 2014; Ave Maria (Grigolo) 2013)	4:11
11.	"Have Yourself a Merry Little Christmas" (from Meet Me in St. Louis)	Ralph Blane (music) Hugh Martin (lyrics); orchestra arrangement by Sally Herbert; backing vocals Shelly Poole, (Awakening Deluxe ed. 2014)	3:50
12.	"Little Drummer Boy" (featuring Il Volo)	Davis, Onorati and Simeone; arranged by Kinkel and Fanai; produced by Fanai and Holley; Il Volo's vocals produced by Celso Valli	3:09
Total length:			45:31

== Charts ==
=== Weekly charts ===
Chart (2016)	Peak position
US Billboard 200	93
US Top Classical Albums (Billboard)	1
US Top Holiday Albums (Billboard)	3

=== Year-end charts ===
Chart (2016)	Position
US Top Classical Albums (Billboard)	27
Chart (2017)	Position
US Top Classical Albums (Billboard)	4
