= Awakening (Jackie Evancho album) =

Studio album by Jackie Evancho
- Released: September 23, 2014
- Studios: Audible Images (Pittsburgh, PA); Shine Studios (London, UK); Angel Studios (London, UK); Tom Tom Studios (Budapest, Hungary)
- Genre: Classical crossover
- Length: 49:39
- Label: Portrait
- Producer: Nick Patrick

Jackie Evancho chronology
Songs from the Silver Screen (2012)	Awakening (2014)	Someday at Christmas (2016)

Awakening is a full-length studio album by Jackie Evancho, consisting of 12 tracks. The album, produced by Nick Patrick, released on September 23, 2014, is Evancho's first album recorded for Sony Masterworks' Portrait Records imprint.

In advance of the album's release, Evancho released two singles from the album and a music video of each: covers of "The Rains of Castamere", from the TV series Game of Thrones, and "Think of Me" from The Phantom of the Opera. Evancho recorded a third PBS special based on the album, which began airing on November 29, 2014, and her concert tour to promote the album began in November 2014.

The album consists of 12 tracks and includes a mix of classical pieces, like Rachmaninoff's "Vocalise", the hymn "Dormi Jesu" and the Vavilov version of "Ave Maria"; classical crossover covers of more contemporary pieces like U2's "With or Without You", Ennio Morricone's "Your Love", Lara Fabian's "Je t'aime" and Within Temptation's "Memories"; and several original songs. Walmart is offering a deluxe edition that includes a second disk with six additional holiday songs. A bonus track cover of "My Immortal" by Evanescence is included exclusively on the album sold in Japan.

Awakening debuted at No. 17 on the Billboard 200 chart and No. 1 on the Billboard Classical Albums chart, Evancho's fifth consecutive release to reach No. 1 on that chart. It remained on the Classical Albums chart for a consecutive 72 weeks. The DVD of the PBS special charted at No. 3 on the Billboard Music Video Sales chart and remained on that chart for eight weeks. In Billboard's year-end rankings, Awakening hung on to be the No. 3 classical album of 2015.

== Promotion ==
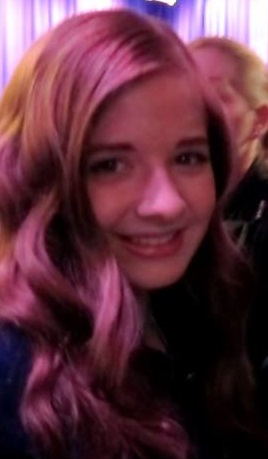
Evancho promoting Awakening at the WSJ Cafe

On June 10, 2014, Evancho released her first single from the album, a cover of "The Rains of Castamere" from the TV series Game of Thrones, and a shadow-art video for the single became available in July. A writer for the Orlando Sentinel said of the song that Evancho's "mature voice sounds stunning." Evancho released a second track, "Think of Me", from The Phantom of the Opera, on July 15, 2014. A video for the song was released, together with a feature piece on Evancho by People magazine, on September 9, 2014. A reviewer for Digital Journal wrote that the song is a "delightful vocal performance. ... She displays her trademark range and her tone is crystalline and controlled. It is a polished and gorgeous vocal, and at times soothing and delicate. On September 22, Billboard magazine streamed Evancho's third single from the album, "Your Love", which became available on the day of the album's release. The magazine commented, "Evancho’s stratospheric vocals are of course impressive for someone her age, though pipes like this are incredible for just about anyone."

Evancho's third PBS special, based on the album, Jackie Evancho – Awakening – Live in Concert, was filmed on August 21, 2014, at Longwood Gardens in Pennsylvania. It began airing on PBS stations on November 29, 2014; Cheyenne Jackson co-hosts and sings "Say Something" as a duet with Evancho. A KPBS preview of the broadcast commented: "Jackie’s astoundingly beautiful young voice soars in the magnificent setting." The special includes all of the songs from Awakening, plus "Say Something" and "O mio babbino caro". A DVD additionally includes "My Immortal". The DVD charted at No. 3 on the Billboard Music Video Sales chart.

On November 5, 2014, in advance of the PBS broadcasts, Evancho released a video of one of the songs from the special, "Ave Maria". The Digital Journal reviewer wrote: "The control she displays over her voice is tremendous, and she tackles the high notes in the chorus effortlessly, showcasing her angelic vocals and piercing pipes." Her concert tour to promote the album began in November 2014. Also to promote the album release, Evancho released a digital download of a track called "Go Time" on July 15, 2014. The song was made for the Justice clothing stores and is available on their website and for free download to Justice shoppers; it is played in their stores on the video monitors. On October 27, 2014, Evancho joined George R. R. Martin, the author of Game of Thrones, at the WSJ Cafe to talk about her album and her cover of "The Rains of Castamere".

Evancho began her television promotions of the album with a return to America's Got Talent as a guest artist, singing "Think of Me" at Radio City Music Hall, on September 10, 2014, during the Top 12 results broadcast of the show's ninth season. She next performed, and was interviewed, on The Today Show on September 22, singing "Your Love". Among other television and media appearances, she performed on The Queen Latifah Show on October 3, and was profiled on the Oprah Winfrey Network on October 5, 2014. Evancho appeared on Dr. Phil on December 16, singing "Ave Maria" and on the Fox & Friends Christmas special on December 24, 2014, singing "The Christmas Song".

== Track listing ==
No.	Title	Writer(s)	Length
1.	"Think of Me" (from The Phantom of the Opera)	Andrew Lloyd Webber (music); Richard Stilgoe and Charles Hart (lyrics)	4:06
2.	"Your Love" (from Once Upon a Time in the West)	Ennio Morricone (music) Dulce Pontes (lyrics)	3:42
3.	"Je t'aime" (from Pure)	Rick Allison (music) Lara Fabian (lyrics)	4:55
4.	"Take Me There"	Johan Oberholzer (music and lyrics)	4:15
5.	"Open Fields of Grace"	Lisa Venkatrathnam and Paul Sumares (music) Lisa Venkatrathnam (lyrics)	3:38
6.	"Ave Maria" (misattributed to Giulio Caccini)	Vladimir Vavilov (music) Traditional (lyrics)	4:50
7.	"Memories" (from The Silent Force)	Robert Westerholt and Sharon den Adel (music); Martijn Spierenburg and den Adel (lyrics)	3:55
8.	"The Rains of Castamere" (from Game of Thrones)	Ramin Djawadi (music) George R. R. Martin (lyrics)	3:36
9.	"Dormi Jesu" (Latin text)	Traditional (music and lyrics)	3:25
10.	"Vocalise" (from "Fourteen Songs", Op. 34)	Sergei Rachmaninoff (no lyrics)	5:06
11.	"With or Without You" (from The Joshua Tree)	U2 (music) Bono (lyrics)	4:23
12.	"Made to Dream"	Jean-Pierre Steyn (music and lyrics)	3:48
Total length:			49:39

Bonus track included only on the version of the album distributed in Japan
No.	Title	Writer(s)	Length
13.	"My Immortal" (from Fallen)	Amy Lee and Ben Moody (music and lyrics)	4:15

Walmart deluxe edition with bonus Christmas EP
No.	Title	Writer(s)	Length
1.	"The Christmas Song"	Bob Wells and Mel Tormé (music and lyrics)	3:58
2.	"Christmas Waltz"	Jule Styne (music) Sammy Cahn (lyrics)	3:35
3.	"Do You Hear What I Hear?"	Gloria Shayne Baker (music) Noël Regney (lyrics)	4:10
4.	"Have Yourself a Merry Little Christmas" (from Meet Me in St. Louis)	Ralph Blane (music) Hugh Martin (lyrics)	3:30
5.	"It Came Upon a Midnight Clear"	Richard Storrs Willis (music) Edmund Sears (lyrics)	3:39
6.	"O Holy Night" (featuring Vittorio Grigolo)	Adolphe Adam (music) John Sullivan Dwight (lyrics)	4:11
Total length:			23:13

== Production ==
Produced by Nick Patrick, Awakening was Evancho's first album recorded for Sony Masterworks' Portrait Records imprint. Evancho recorded the vocals on the album early in 2014 at Audible Images' studio, Pittsburgh, Pennsylvania. Other recording was done in London and Budapest, Hungary. The album features the Budapest Concert Orchestra and the Budapest City Choir backing Evancho in most of the tracks, conducted by Nicholas Dodd on some tracks and Richard Cottle on others. The orchestral and choir arrangements are by Dodd, Cottle and Sally Herbert.

== Reception ==
The album debuted at No. 17 on the Billboard 200 chart and No. 1 on the Billboard Classical Albums chart. Awakening was Evancho's fifth consecutive release to reach No. 1 on the Billboard Classical Albums chart. On its year-end charts, Billboard ranked Awakening as the No. 11 best-selling classical album of 2014 the No. 3 classical album of 2015 and the No. 31 best-selling classical album of 2016.

Markos Papadatos of Digital Journal gave Evancho's album an A rating, calling it "stunning from start to finish thanks to her warm classical vocals." He called her renditions of the songs "ethereal", "crystalline" and "haunting". A review in The Star commented: "There’s no doubt that Evancho still has the vocal chops today. ... The soprano is still in top form with Ennio Morricone's "Your Love" but it is her rendition of contemporary tunes that prove most interesting. Evancho succeeds even out of her comfort zone, deftly manoeuvring through Within Temptation's "Memories" though her delivery of U2's "With Or Without You" could have used more grit and gusto." The MD Theatre Guide also gave the album an enthusiastic review.

== Charts ==
Chart performance for Awakening
Chart (2014)	Peak position
US Billboard 200	17
US Top Classical Albums (Billboard)	1
US Top Classical Crossover Albums (Billboard)	1
