= Songs from the Silver Screen =

Studio album by Jackie Evancho
- Released: October 2, 2012
- Studio: Abbey Road Studios (London, England); Audible Images (Pittsburgh, PA); EastWest Studios (Los Angeles, CA); Lion Share Studios (Los Angeles, CA)
- Genre: Classical crossover; popular standards
- Length: 54:13
- Label: Columbia; Syco
- Producer: Bill Ross; Humberto Gatica

Jackie Evancho chronology
Heavenly Christmas (2011)	Songs from the Silver Screen (2012)	Awakening (2014)

Songs from the Silver Screen is the fourth full-length album released by American singer Jackie Evancho. It was released on October 2, 2012; at the time of release, Evancho was 12 years old. The album is composed of 12 songs used in popular films, arranged by Bill Ross. The songs include a mix of ballads from Disney films, romantic and whimsical themes, and songs that were originally written as singles or show tunes. The producers are Ross and Humberto Gatica for Columbia Records and Syco.

In June 2012, Evancho made her second PBS special, Jackie Evancho: Music of the Movies, for the Great Performances series, which features all but one selection from Songs from the Silver Screen. PBS stations began airing the special in August 2012. A DVD of the special was given as a pledge gift by PBS and was later bundled with the Target stores' "Deluxe Edition" of Songs of the Silver Screen. Evancho promoted the album with television appearances and a concert tour. The first leg of the tour ran from August 2012 to June 2013, and a second leg of the tour ran from October 2013 to June 2014.

The album debuted at #7 on the Billboard 200 and #1 on the Classical Albums chart. The Allmusic review of Songs from the Silver Screen awards the album 3-1/2 stars out of five and states that the album "finds Evancho more than up to the task, displaying maturity and poise."

== Track list ==
No.	Title	Writer(s)	Length
1.	"Pure Imagination" (from Willy Wonka & the Chocolate Factory)	Anthony Newley (music) and Leslie Bricusse (lyrics)	5:08
2.	"The Music of the Night" (from The Phantom of the Opera)	Andrew Lloyd Webber (music) and Charles Hart and Richard Stilgoe (lyrics)	5:03
3.	"Can You Feel the Love Tonight" (from The Lion King)	Elton John (music) and Tim Rice (lyrics)	4:22
4.	"Reflection" (from Mulan)	Matthew Wilder (music) and David Zippel (lyrics)	4:26
5.	"The Summer Knows" (from Summer of 42, featuring Chris Botti, trumpet)	Michel Legrand (music) and Marilyn and Alan Bergman (lyrics)	4:19
6.	"I See the Light" (from Tangled, featuring Jacob Evancho, tenor)	Alan Menken (music) and Glenn Slater (lyrics)	4:22
7.	"What a Wonderful World" (from Good Morning, Vietnam)	Bob Thiele (as George Douglas) and George David Weiss	4:08
8.	"Se (love theme)" (from Cinema Paradiso, Italian lyrics, featuring 2Cellos)	Ennio and Andrea Morricone (music) and Alessio de Sensi (lyrics)	3:28
9.	"My Heart Will Go On" (from Titanic, featuring Joshua Bell, violin)	James Horner (music) and Will Jennings (lyrics)	5:22
10.	"Come What May" (from Moulin Rouge!, featuring The Canadian Tenors)	David Baerwald and Kevin Gilbert	4:52
11.	"Some Enchanted Evening" (from South Pacific)	Rodgers and Hammerstein	4:10
12.	"When I Fall In Love" (from Sleepless in Seattle)	Victor Young (music) and Edward Heyman (lyrics)	4:37
Total length:			54:17

Target exclusive performance DVD (disc 2)
No.	Title	Length
1.	"Pure Imagination"
2.	"Can You Feel the Love Tonight"
3.	"Some Enchanted Evening"
4.	"What a Wonderful World"
5.	"My Heart Will Go On" (with Caroline Campbell, violin)
6.	"The Summer Knows" (with Jumaane Smith, trumpet)
7.	"I See the Light" (with Jacob Evancho, tenor)
8.	"Se"
9.	"The Music of the Night"
10.	"When I Fall In Love"
11.	"Come What May" (with The Canadian Tenors)
12.	"Reflection"

== Promotion ==
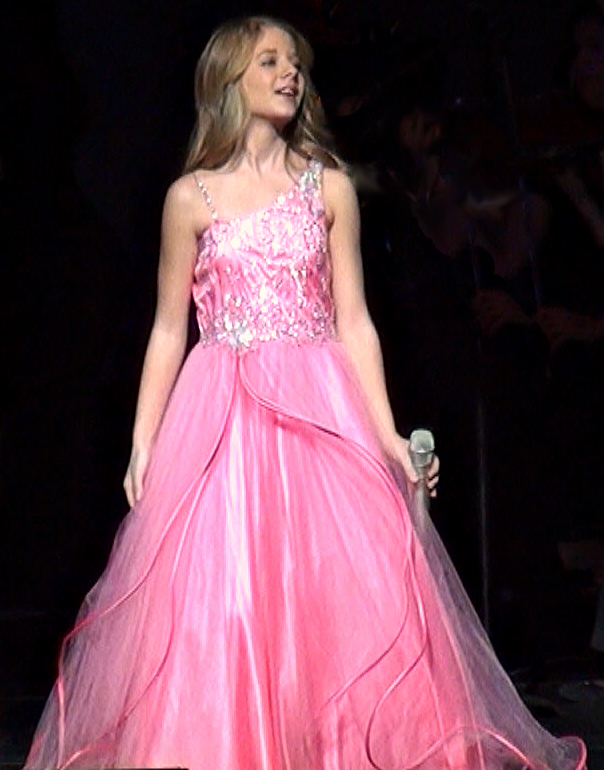
Evancho in concert on November 14, 2012

Evancho began a tour to promote the album in August 2012. On August 19, 2012 she performed her first solo concert that included songs from the album in Japan with the Tokyo Philharmonic Orchestra. She continued the tour in the U.S., appearing first with The Chamber Orchestra of Philadelphia. The first leg of the tour included concerts in two dozen North American cities, ending in June 2013 in Lewiston, New York. She resumed touring in October 2013, with appearances in a dozen more cities through January 2014, and gave three additional concerts between April and June 2014, followed by a final three concerts in August 2014.

Upon the album's release, Evancho began to appear on television talk shows to promote the album, including The Today Show (October 2, 2012), The View and Fox & Friends (October 5), The Talk (October 10), and The Today Show with Kathie Lee and Hoda (October 12). She appeared later in 2012 on CNN's Showbiz Tonight, Good Day LA, The Rachael Ray Show and Live! with Kelly and Michael. In December 2013, Evancho sang on The Queen Latifah Show.

A piano-vocal score of the songs on the album was published in 2013.

== Reception ==
Professional ratings
Review scores
Source	Rating
Allmusic	3.5/5 stars

Allmusic gave the album 3-1/2 stars out of a possible five, stating: "Evancho's effortless and expressive voice lends itself well to the project", and the album "finds Evancho more than up to the task, displaying maturity and poise." The Trades reviewer Paul Schultz wrote, "your ears stare in wide-eyed wonder (yes, I know I'm mixing metaphors) that such a rich instrument belongs to one as young as Jackie. Her upper altissimo notes are beauty themselves, and her angelic voice now exhibits fuller and enriched low registers as she ages. ... Her lyrical pronunciation could still use some work as you can't quite understand all the words." Tallawah Magazine chose it as their "Album of the Week" and rated it an A+. In their track-by-track analysis of the album, Classic FM praised, among other things, Evancho's "musical maturity" in "The Music of the Night" and wrote that "'Come What May' ... is another romantic number that perfectly suits Evancho's soaring soprano" and 'When I Fall In Love' ... is a gorgeous song that sounds like it was custom-built for Evancho's voice."

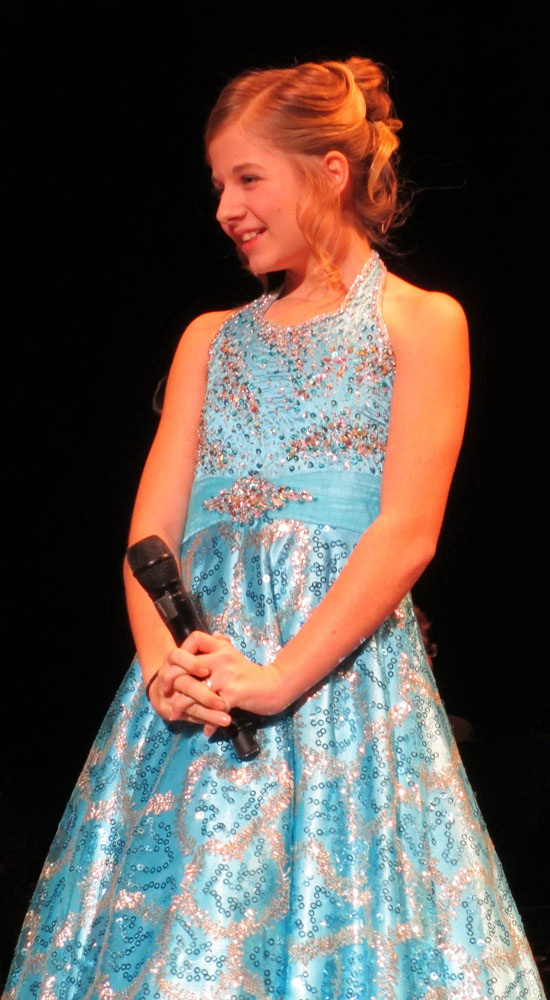
Evancho on tour promoting the album in January 2013

The album debuted at #7 on the Billboard 200, #1 on the Classical Albums chart and #22 on the Canadian Albums chart. It also charted at #141 in Japan. The top ten debut made the 12-year-old Evancho the second artist who ever "amassed three top 10 albums [on the Billboard 200] at such a young age." In August 2012, Evancho recorded the song "Kōjō no Tsuki" (Moon over castle ruins) in Japanese as a bonus track to the Japanese release of the album. Norman Lebrecht wrote of the track: "To our ears, the singing is close to flawless."

The album remained on the Billboard 200 for 13 weeks and appeared on the Billboard Classical Albums chart in 72 weeks. Billboard ranked the album #7 on its 2012 year-end Classical Albums chart and #4 on its 2013 year-end Classical Albums chart. It was also the #36 Classical Album of 2014.

== PBS Special ==
In 2012, Evancho made her second PBS Great Performances special, called Jackie Evancho: Music of the Movies. The program was filmed on June 13, 2012 at the Orpheum Theatre in Los Angeles. The special's executive producer and director is David Horn, co-producer is Humberto Gatica, and conductor and arranger is Bill Ross. Guest artists include The Canadian Tenors, Jacob (now Juliet) Evancho, and Jumaane Smith on the trumpet.

PBS stations began airing the special on August 11, 2012, while offering a DVD version of the program as a pledge gift. The DVD also accompanied the CD "deluxe" release of Songs from the Silver Screen by Target. "What a Wonderful World", the only song from Songs from the Silver Screen omitted from the PBS special, is included on the DVD. A TV Worth Watching reviewer stated, "From a Willy Wonka number ('Pure Imagination'), to Phantom of the Opera's almost-epic 'Music of the Night,' the young singer has it all under control." One reviewer wrote: "It was an interesting introduction into a talented young individual, and it was stunning to see a person of such a young age run an entire special by herself." The special continued to be broadcast by PBS stations in 2013.

== Charts ==
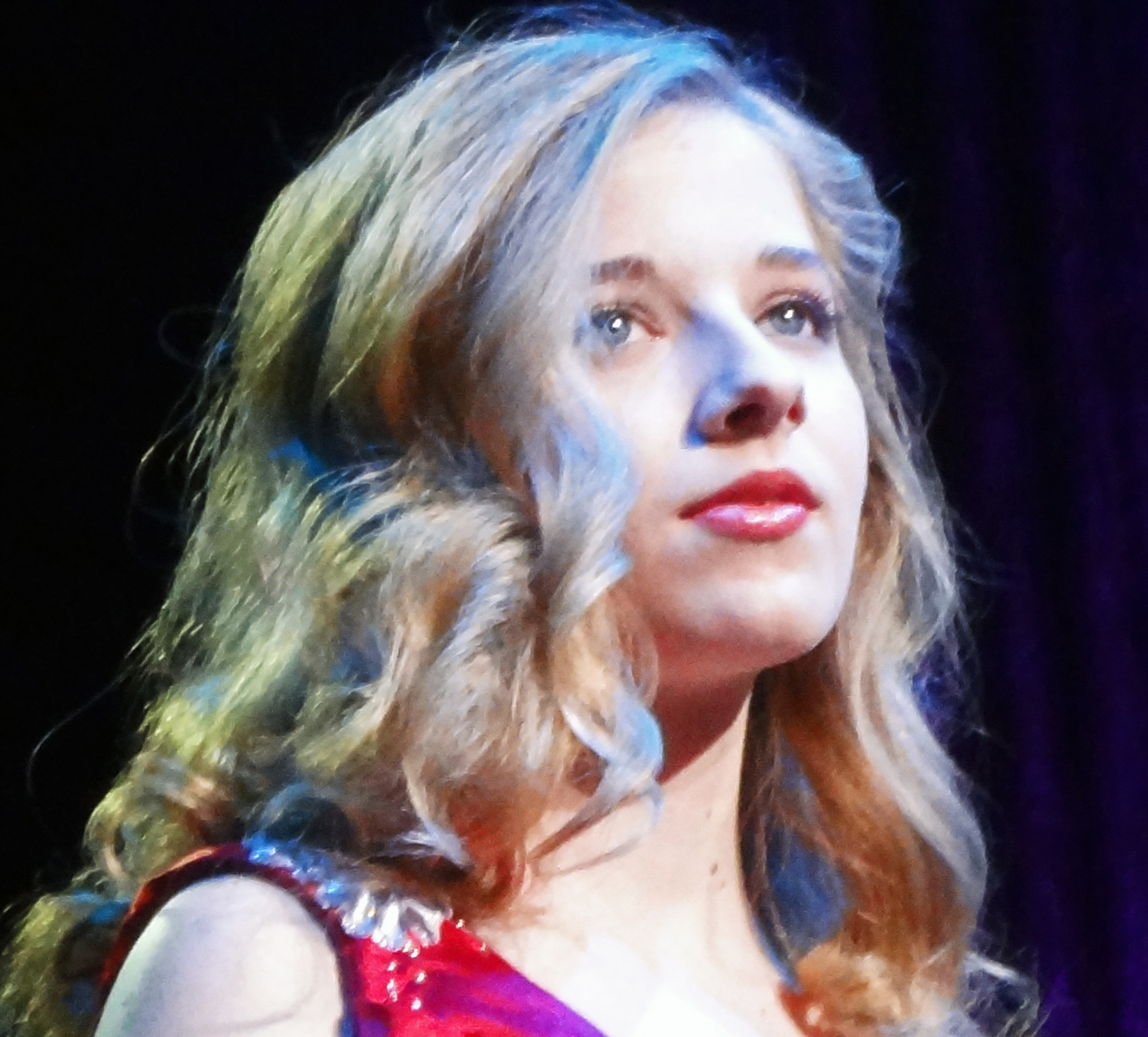
Evancho promoting the album in April 2014

Chart (2012)	Peak position
Canadian Albums Chart	22
Japanese Albums Chart	141
US Billboard 200	7
US Billboard Top Classical Albums	1
