= Vyatcheslav Kagan-Paley =

Belarusian singer (born 1964)

Vyatcheslav Kagan-Paley Вячаслаў Каган-Палей
- Also known as: Slava
- Born: 1964 (age 61–62); Gomel, Byelorussian SSR, Soviet Union
- Genres: Classical
- Occupation: Singer
- Instrument: Singing

Vyatcheslav Kagan-Paley (Note: Belarusian: Вячаслаў Каган-Палей, romanized: Vyachaslaw Kahan-Paley) (born 1964, also known as Slava) (Note: Belarusian: Слава, romanized: Slava) is a Belarusian countertenor, male alto, and baritone.
