= Dream with Me =

2011 album by Jackie Evancho

Studio album by Jackie Evancho
- Released: June 3, 2011
- Studios: Chartmaker Studio (Malibu, CA); The Newman Scoring Stage (Los Angeles, CA); Westlake Recording Studios (Hollywood, CA)
- Genre: Classical crossover
- Length: 54:56
- Languages: English; Italian; French
- Labels: Columbia; 143; Syco; Sony Classical
- Producer: David Foster

Jackie Evancho chronology
O Holy Night (2010)	Dream with Me (2011)	Heavenly Christmas (2011)

Dream with Me is the second full-length album (first on a major label) by American singer Jackie Evancho. It was released on June 3, 2011 on digital download format, and on June 14, 2011 in the standard CD format. Evancho was eleven years old when this album was released, although she was still ten when it was recorded. The album was produced by 16-time Grammy Award winner David Foster.

This album features duets with Barbra Streisand and Britain's Got Talent runner-up Susan Boyle, as well as twelve solo tracks. The album debuted at number 2 on the Billboard 200 chart, reached number 1 on the Billboard's US Classical Chart, and was certified gold by the RIAA. The singer promoted the album on talk shows, in a popular PBS Great Performances special and through a national concert tour with symphony orchestras at Lincoln Center, throughout the U.S. and elsewhere.

== Promotion and concerts ==
Evancho promoted the album on talk shows on every major U.S. network and concerts in the U.S., London and Toronto. A deluxe edition of Dream With Me, available exclusively from Target, featured four bonus tracks: "Someday", "Mi Mancherai", "The Impossible Dream" and "A Time For Us".

Evancho performed nearly the same songs as those on the Dream With Me CD for her first solo concert televised special, which first aired in June 2011 on PBS stations ("The Prayer" was omitted, but "Dark Waltz" and "Mi Mancherai" were added). The program was part of the PBS Great Performances series, co-produced by SYCO/Columbia. It was frequently rebroadcast during 2011, and by early August 2011, the special had been broadcast nearly 2,000 times. It became "one of the most viewed specials in the 38-year-history of the Great Performances series [and] raised record amounts of money for PBS stations." The special continued to be shown into 2013.

Evancho was the youngest solo artist ever to headline a special on the Great Performances series. The concert was taped in April 2011 at the John and Mable Ringling Museum of Art in Sarasota, Florida, and was co-hosted by David Foster, who played the piano in the orchestra for many of the selections, while Conrad Tao played piano and violin in some selections. The performances are available as a CD/DVD titled Dream With Me In Concert. Allmusic noted: "the concert version ... sounds nearly identical (outside of the waves of applause) to the studio album ... but the accompanying DVD, which features the heavily choreographed performance, as well as an extensive photo gallery and interviews with both Evancho and Foster, should provide enough eye and ear candy to appease fans of the gifted young vocalist until a proper follow-up appears.

In July 2011, the singer began her first official tour across the United States, to promote the album. It consisted of a series of performances with symphony orchestras, beginning with the Sun Valley Orchestra on July 31, followed by the Atlanta Symphony Orchestra on August 5, the Ravinia Festival Orchestra on August 7, the Omaha Symphony Orchestra on August 26, the Dallas Symphony Orchestra on August 31 and her hometown Pittsburgh Opera on October 16. Conductor Antony Walker took the opportunity to introduce her fans (many of whom were newcomers to opera) to the Pittsburgh Opera's chorus and soloists, who performed several numbers from Verdi, Bizet and Puccini along with Evancho's repertoire. Evancho made her New York City concert debut at Avery Fisher Hall with songs from the album on November 7, 2011. Her last concert of the year was in Las Vegas with David Foster in Las Vegas on December 29.

After presenting her concert in Japan in January 2012 with the Tokyo Philharmonic Orchestra, Evancho resumed her U.S. "Dream With Me" tour later the same month in California. She gave three more concerts in February, with the San Diego Symphony, in Los Angeles, and with Fresno Grand Opera's orchestra, and another three in March, in San Francisco, Sacramento, and West Valley City, Utah. In June 2012, she concluded the tour with performances in Alpharetta, Georgia and Newark, New Jersey.

== Reception ==
Professional ratings
Review scores
Source	Rating
Allmusic	3.5/5 stars

Allmusic gave the album 3-1/2 stars out of a possible five, commenting: "Dream with Me hits all of the right notes, though there are few surprises or big moments to be found ... resulting in a solid "official" debut from a rising star at the dawn of her career." Female First magazine wrote: "To say expectations were high for this would be an understatement. However, every expectation for a talented child were blown away from the first track. ... [T]here is constant emotion from a truly talented voice." USA Today rated the album 2-1/2 stars out of four: "[Evancho's] sweet, unblemished vocal tone and slow, careful vibrato hardly betray her young age. ... But Dream's predictable and often bombastic odes to love and faith can undermine the tween's most appealing quality: innocence. I'd have preferred a little less pomp and Puccini and more youthful wonder." People magazine gave the album three out of four stars, comparing Evancho favorably with her duet partners Barbra Streisand and Susan Boyle. The reviewer for Kelowna Capital News in Canada called Evancho a "massive talent [who] seems equally adept at operatic arias, pop songs and show tunes." A Yahoo! review commented, "This new album ... is a comparative stunner".

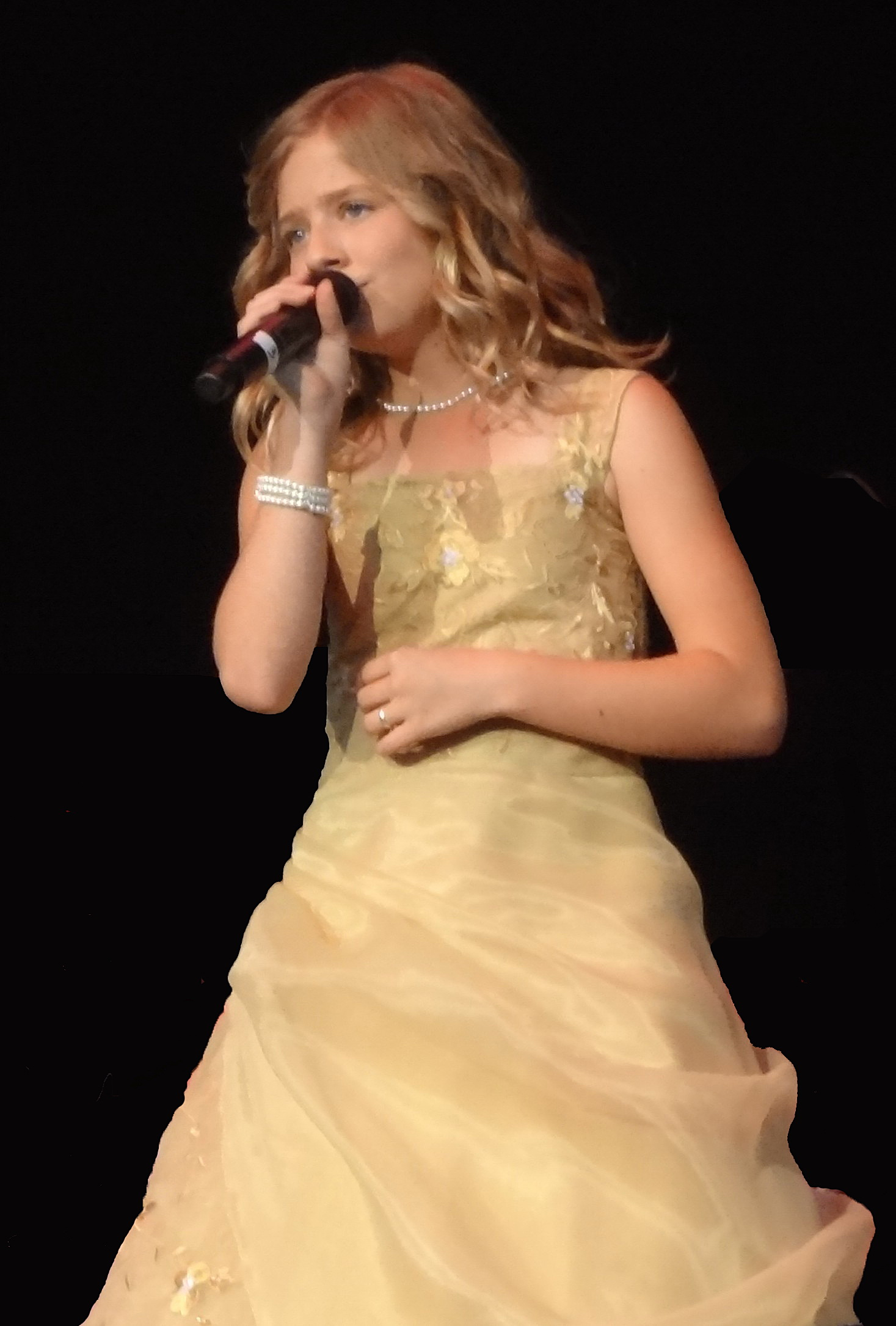
Evancho in concert in June 2012

In the US, the album debuted at number two on the US Billboard 200 chart, selling 161,000 copies. The only album ahead of it was Bad Meets Evil's EP Hell: The Sequel. Dream With Me debuted at number two on the Billboard 200 chart, spent 17 consecutive weeks in the number one position on Billboard's US Classical Albums chart, and was certified gold by the RIAA. The album remained on the Billboard 200 for 30 consecutive weeks and remained on the Classical Albums chart for 74 consecutive weeks. The album also reached #5 in Canada, #4 in the UK (where it was later certified silver), #4 on the World Albums Top 40 chart, #8 in New Zealand, #15 in Ireland, #26 on the Mexican chart and #37 in Japan, where it remained on the charts for 16 weeks. With Dream With Me, Evancho became the youngest artist ever to debut on the UK charts in the top 5.

In November 2011, after the release of Evancho's new album, Heavenly Christmas, sales of Dream With Me increased, and the album climbed to number 55 on the Billboard 200. In its 2011 year-end charts, Billboard ranked Dream With Me as the second-best selling Classical Album for the year (behind Evancho's O Holy Night) and as the number 45 album of 2011 in the U.S. After Evancho's singing appearance on Dancing with the Stars on April 30, 2012, the album regained the #1 ranking on the Billboard Classical Albums chart and rejoined the Billboard 200 at #178 for the Billboard week dated May 19, 2012. As of October 2012, the album had sold 682,000 copies. Billboard ranked the album #5 on its 2012 year-end Classical Albums chart.

The DVD, Dream With Me: In Concert, topped the "Top Music Videos" chart in two of its first four weeks, and Billboard ranked it the #21 best selling music video DVD of 2011. It charted in Mexico at #75 and at #294 in Japan. Billboard ranked Dream With Me In Concert the #16 music video album of 2012, and by December 2012, Dream With Me In Concert had been ranked on the Billboard.biz Top Music Video chart in more than 60 weeks. Dream With Me, the song "To Believe" and Foster's production of the album, are discussed in detail in the 2013 Ph.D. dissertation of Evancho's uncle, composer Matthew Evancho.

== Track listing ==
No.	Title	Writer(s)	Length
1.	"When You Wish Upon a Star"	Leigh Harline, Ned Washington	3:41
2.	"Nella Fantasia" (Italian lyrics)	Ennio Morricone, Chiara Ferrau	4:18
3.	"A Mother's Prayer" (with Susan Boyle)	David Foster, Carole Bayer Sager	4:28
4.	"Nessun Dorma" (Italian lyrics)	Giacomo Puccini, Giuseppe Adami, Renato Simoni	3:13
5.	"Angel"	Sarah McLachlan	5:22
6.	"O mio babbino caro" (Italian lyrics)	Giacomo Puccini, Christopher Todd Landor	2:20
7.	"Somewhere" (featuring Barbra Streisand)	Leonard Bernstein, Stephen Sondheim	3:51
8.	"All I Ask of You"	Charles Hart, Andrew Lloyd Webber, Richard Stilgoe	3:55
9.	"Ombra mai fu" (Italian lyrics)	George Frideric Handel	3:34
10.	"Lovers"	Shigeru Umebayashi	5:01
11.	"Imaginer" (French lyrics)	Walter Afanasieff, Lara Fabian	4:56
12.	"The Lord's Prayer"	Albert Hay Malotte	3:40
13.	"To Believe"	Matthew Evancho	4:28
14.	"Dream With Me"	David Foster, Linda Thompson, Jackie Evancho	2:09
Total length:			54:56

Target deluxe edition
No.	Title	Writer(s)	Length
15.	"Someday"	Alan Menken, Stephen Schwartz	3:56
16.	"Mi Mancherai (Il Postino)" (Italian lyrics)	Luis Bacalov, Marco Marinangeli	4:04
17.	"The Impossible Dream"	Mitch Leigh, Joe Darion	3:50
18.	"A Time For Us"	Larry Kusik, Eddie Snyder	3:14
Total length:			70:00

Notes

- Track listing and credits from album booklet except for composer for track 9 which it incorrectly states is traditional.
- All tracks are produced by David Foster.

== Release history ==
Region	Date	Format	Label	Edition
Worldwide	June 3, 2011	Digital download	Sony Music Entertainment	Standard
Worldwide	June 14, 2011	CD	Columbia Records	Standard and deluxe

== Locations and studios ==
Recording locations and studios included:

- Recorded at Chartmaker Studio – (Malibu, CA)
- Mixed at Blue Studio – (Malibu, CA)
- Orchestra recorded at The Newman Scoring Stage, Twentieth Century Fox Studios – (Los Angeles, CA)
- Choir and trumpet recorded at Westlake Recording Studios – (Hollywood, CA)
- Mastering at Universal Mastering Studios – (New York, NY)

== Charts ==
=== Weekly charts ===
Chart (2011)	Peak position
Canadian Albums (Billboard)	5
Irish Albums (IRMA)	15
Japanese Albums (Oricon)	37
New Zealand Albums (RMNZ)	8
Scottish Albums (Official Charts)	4
UK Albums (Official Charts)	4
US Billboard 200	2
US Top Classical Albums (Billboard)	1

=== Year-end charts ===
Chart (2011)	Position
US Billboard 200	45
US Top Classical Albums (Billboard)	2

Chart (2012)	Position
US Top Classical Albums (Billboard)	5

== Certifications ==
Region	Certification	Certified units/sales
United Kingdom (BPI)	Silver	60,000^{*}
United States (RIAA)	Gold	500,000^{^}
^{*} Sales figures based on certification alone.^{^} Shipments figures based on certification alone.

== See also ==
- Jackie Evancho discography
