= The Virgin's Cradle Hymn =

Song

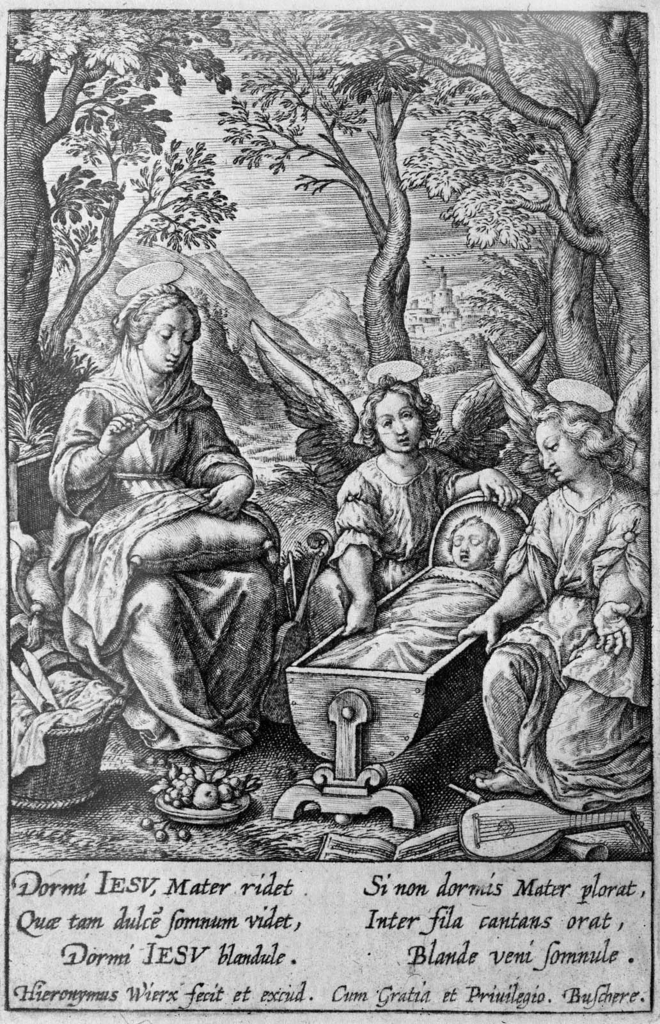
The engraving by Hieronymus Wierix which Coleridge encountered in 1799.

"The Virgin's Cradle Hymn" is a short lullaby text. It was collected while on a tour of Germany by the English poet Samuel Taylor Coleridge, and published in his Sibylline Leaves of 1817. According to his own note, Coleridge copied the Latin text from a "print of the Blessed Virgin in a Catholic village in Germany", which he later translated into English. The text, actually from a collection of devotional Flemish engravings by Hieronymus Wierix, has inspired a number of modern choral and vocal musical settings.

== Background ==
Coleridge embarked upon his tour of Germany with his close friend William Wordsworth in 1798 shortly after the publication of their Lyrical Ballads of 1798. It was in May 1799, the eleventh month of his tour, that he encountered the print in a village inn. His diary records that it was either Womarshausen or Giebaldhausen, both Roman Catholic villages in the vicinity of Mainz.

The print itself was of Dutch origin, from a book entitled Jesu Christi Dei Domini Salvatoris nostra Infantia ("The Infancy of our Lord and Saviour Jesus Christ"), a collection of prints and accompanying verse by Flemish engraver Hieronymus Wierix (1553–1619). The verse accompanied an image titled "The Virgin Sewing While Angels Rock Her Son to Sleep", a woodcutting of the infant Jesus asleep in a cradle, rocked by two angels, while the Virgin Mary sits alongside engaged in needlework.

Coleridge sent the Latin copy to be printed in the Courier in 1801 as "A Correspondent in Germany". Despite having made a translation in his notebook, Coleridge did not consider publishing his English version of the short poem for almost ten years. He first published the two side-by-side in the Courier in 1811. Coleridge retold the story of his collection of the text and suggested that it could be sung to the tune of "the famous Sicilian Hymn Adeste Fideles laeti triumphantes", nowadays better known as "O Come All Ye Faithful". He later published the poem and his translation in his collection Sibylline Leaves of 1817.

== Text ==
Dormi, Jesu! Mater ridet
Quae tam dulcem somnum videt,
Dormi, Jesu! blandule!
Si non-dormis, Mater plorat,
Inter fila cantans orat,
Blande, veni, somnule.

—Latin original

Sleep, sweet babe! my cares beguiling:
Mother sits beside thee smiling;
Sleep, my darling, tenderly!
If thou sleep not, mother mourneth,
Singing as her wheel she turneth:
Come, soft slumber, balmily!

—Translation by S. T. Coleridge

Holy Infant in Thy cradle,
With thy mother watching o'er Thee,
Slumber softly, slumber gently,
In her loving care, rest sweet Babe, peacefully.

As she bends to gaze upon Thee,
From her lips a prayer falls softly;
Is there in her heart a sorrow?
For she, weeping, rocks Thee tenderly.

— Translation by Arthur Charlton, lines 1-8

== Musical settings ==
Further to Coleridge's own musical suggestion, the short text has inspired a number of modern composers, and is usually titled "The Virgin's Cradle Hymn" or "Dormi, Jesu". These are mostly choral compositions, although occasionally rendered as art songs (lieder). These settings include:

- Alexander MacKenzie (published 1892 for mezzo-soprano, piano, violin or cello)
- Charles Macpherson (published 1893, SATB)
- Edward MacDowell (published 1894 for voice and piano)
- Ralph Vaughan Williams (first performed 1894 for voice and piano, first published in The Vocalist, April 1905 as "A cradle song")
- Charles Lee Williams (organist of Gloucester Cathedral and a founder of the Three Choirs Festival, published 1903 for five-part chorus)
- Herbert Fryer's version was published in 1918
- Anton Webern (published 1923-4, from Fünf Canons, Op. 16, No. 2)
- Edmund Rubbra (published 1925, Op.3 for SATB chorus)
- Stephen Tuttle (published 1943, soprano, SSAA chorus and piano)
- John Tasker Howard (published 1947 for SSA chorus with piano accompaniment)
- Ronald Corp (published 1975, SATB)
- John Rutter (SATB with organ or orchestra, commissioned for the 1999 King's College Festival of Nine Lessons and Carols)
- Kim André Arnesen (published 2014, SSAATTBB)
- Jack Gibbons (composed 2014, SA chorus and piano, first performed in English 2014 as "The Virgin's Cradle Hymn")
- Richard Rodney Bennett (SSA chorus)
- Kevin Puts (in the pivotal Christmas Truce scene of the opera Silent Night).

== See also ==
- Christian child's prayer § Lullabies
