= State Theatre (Easton, Pennsylvania) =

- U.S. National Register of Historic Places
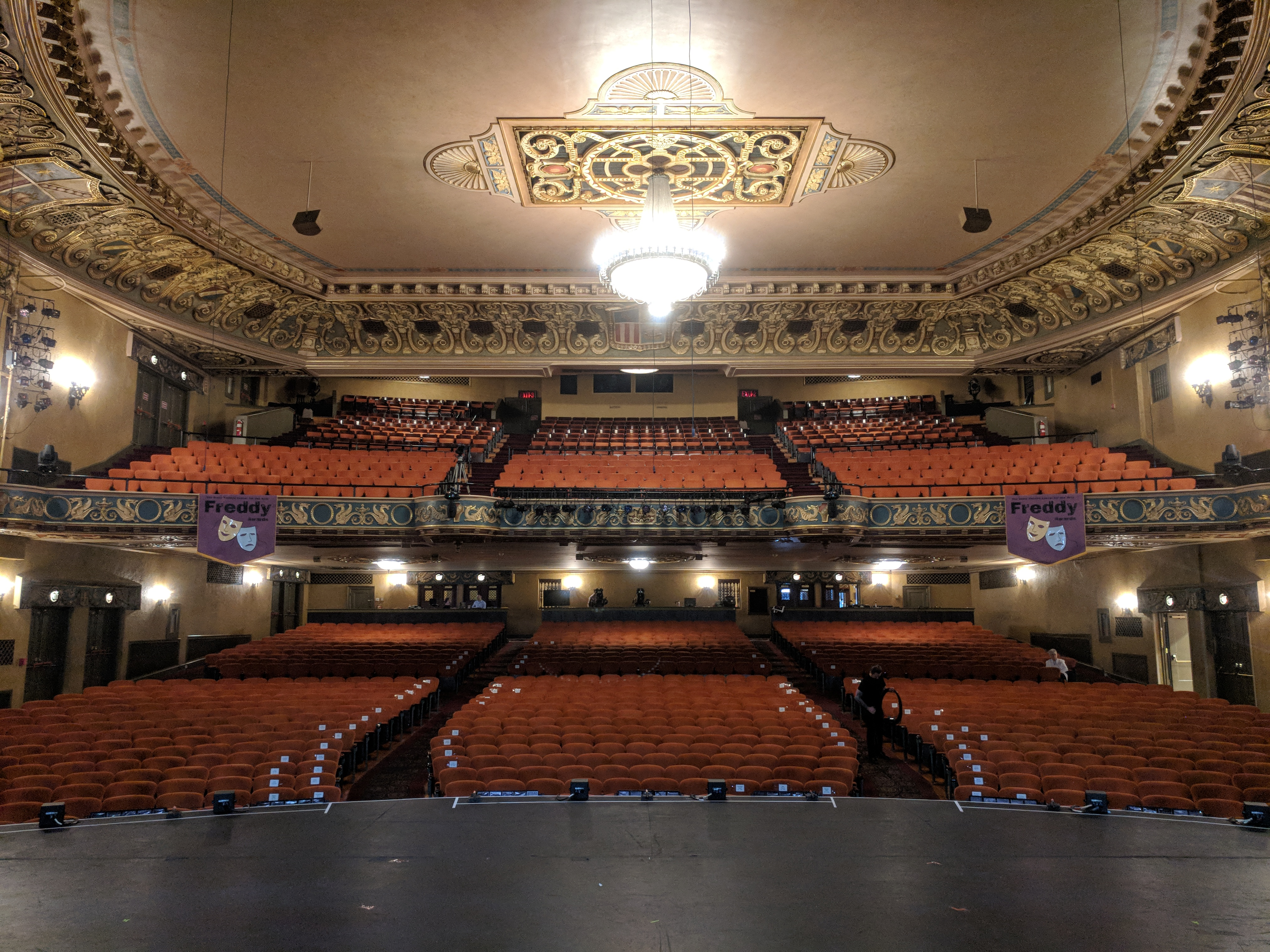
- The interior of Easton's State Theater in 2018

- Location within Pennsylvania Location within the United States
- Location: 453 Northampton St., Easton, Pennsylvania
- Coordinates: 40°41′29″N 75°12′45″W
- Area: 0.6 acres (0.24 ha)
- Built: 1910, 1925
- Architect: Lee, W.H.
- Architectural style: Beaux Arts
- NRHP reference No.: 82003804
- Added to NRHP: March 4, 1982

The State Theatre, officially known as the State Theatre Center for the Arts, is a 1,500-seat, historic, American theater that is located in the City of Easton, Northampton County, Pennsylvania.

It was added to the National Register of Historic Places in 1982.

== History ==
The building began to take its present form in 1910, when modified from a bank building to a vaudeville theater, called the Neumeyers Vaudeville House. The building was extensively modified in 1926, to include a larger auditorium, balcony, and lush decorations; at that time it was renamed "The State." The building is asymmetrical with a cut stone Beaux-Arts style facade and large overhanging marquee.

The theater has hosted the Freddy Awards, which honor the best in high school theater programs in the Lehigh Valley, every year since the inaugural show in 2003.
