= The Debut (album) =

Studio album by Jackie Evancho

Studio album by Jackie Evancho
- Released: April 12, 2019
- Studios: Mission Sound (New York, NY); Mojo Music (New York, NY)
- Genre: Classical crossover
- Length: 36:08
- Label: JE Touring
- Producer: Michael Mangini

Jackie Evancho chronology
Two Hearts (2017)	The Debut (2019)	Carousel of Time (2022)

The Debut is a studio album by Jackie Evancho, consisting of 10 tracks. The album was released on April 12, 2019, on Evancho's independent JE Touring label.

The tracks concentrate on songs from 21st century Broadway musicals and musical films. The album was produced by Michael Mangini. Evancho began a U.S. tour in April 2019 to promote The Debut and promoted the album on various media, including Yahoo! Finance and Good Morning America.

The album was Evancho's eighth consecutive release on the Billboard Classical Albums chart to reach No. 1.

== Development and production ==
Evancho said of the genesis of the album,

I wanted The Debut to sort of be the new American Songbook, so that required looking into these newer Broadway shows. … I was trying to find a way that I could break into a younger demographic, but not neglect [the older] fans that I do have. I was looking into Broadway shows that a lot of older [fans] love, and I was seeing that there were a lot of younger people adoring the soundtracks, especially Hamilton. And I thought, well this would be a perfect idea for me to really delve into that world and see if I can merge the young and the old demos. And I fell in love with the music and the characters and the plays, everything about it.

The album was produced by Michael Mangini and recorded at Mission Sound & Mojo Music, Brooklyn, New York. The MUSA Prague orchestra was conducted by Richard Hein. Piano and keyboards on the album were played by Jorn Swart, who became Evancho's music director for her subsequent tour, drums and percussion were played by Jake Goldbas, bass was played by Leon Boykins, and guitars and mandolin were played by Dylan Kondor. It was mastered by Chris Gehringer at Sterling Sound Studios; the executive producer was Cathleen Murphy.

== Release and promotion ==
In February 2019, Evancho released her cover of "Somewhere" as a YouTube video (audio) and performed the song on the finale of America's Got Talent: The Champions. On April 10, she released a music video of "Burn" on YouTube, and on April 12, 2019, she released The Debut.

Evancho began a U.S. tour in April 2019 to promote The Debut, with a concert at Feinstein's/54 Below in New York City. She also promoted the album on various media, including Yahoo! Finance and Good Morning America, often singing "Burn".

== Track listing ==
Source: Liner notes

No.	Title	Writer(s)	Length
1.	"Burn" (from Hamilton)	Lin-Manuel Miranda	3:58
2.	"A Million Dreams" (from The Greatest Showman)	Benj Pasek and Justin Paul	4:29
3.	"Falling Slowly" (from Once)	Glen Hansard and Markéta Irglová	4:27
4.	"Somewhere" (from West Side Story)	music by Leonard Bernstein and lyrics by Stephen Sondheim	3:06
5.	"Requiem" (from Dear Evan Hansen)	Benj Pasek and Justin Paul	3:56
6.	"Once Upon a December" (from Anastasia)	music by Stephen Flaherty and lyrics by Lynn Ahrens	2:57
7.	"I'm Not That Girl" (from Wicked)	Stephen Schwartz	3:19
8.	"She Used to Be Mine" (from Waitress)	Sara Bareilles	3:44
9.	"Whispering" (from Spring Awakening)	music by Duncan Sheik and lyrics by Steven Sater	3:04
10.	"Another Day" / "No Day But Today" (from Rent)	Jonathan Larson	3:08
Total length:			36:08

== Charts ==
Chart performance for The Debut
Chart (2019)	Peak position
US Independent Albums (Billboard)	23
US Top Classical Albums (Billboard)	1
US Top Classical Crossover Albums (Billboard)	1
US Top Current Albums (Billboard)	96
