= Heavenly Christmas =

Studio album by Jackie Evancho
- Released: November 1, 2011
- Studios: Avatar Studios (New York, NY); Mr. Small's Funhouse (Pittsburgh, PA)
- Genres: Classical crossover; holiday
- Length: 37:50
- Labels: Columbia; Syco; Sony
- Producer: Rob Mounsey

Jackie Evancho chronology
Dream With Me (2011)	Heavenly Christmas (2011)	Songs from the Silver Screen (2012)

Heavenly Christmas is American singer Jackie Evancho's first full-length Christmas album, and her fourth album overall. It was released when she was eleven years old. This album contains ten tracks and was produced by Rob Mounsey, with arrangements by Mounsey and Ryan Shore for Sony Music Entertainment.

The album was released on November 1, 2011, exclusively at Walmart and Walmart.com in the U.S., and at other U.S. sellers on October 16, 2012. Evancho is accompanied by the Orchestra of St. Luke's and the New York Chorus of St. Cecilia, conducted by Rob Mounsey. The album climbed to No. 11 on the Billboard 200 chart and peaked at No. 1 on Billboard's Classical Albums chart, No. 3 on the Holiday Albums chart and No. 9 on the Canadian Albums chart.

Billboard ranked Heavenly Christmas as the No. 2 Classical album in the U.S. in 2012 and No. 41 on the 2012 Canadian Albums chart.

== Promotion ==
Walmart ran some brief television advertisements to promote the album in early November 2011, and Evancho released videos of three songs from the album.

In December 2011, Evancho made talk show appearances on all the major television networks to promote Heavenly Christmas, singing "The First Noël" on The View and The Talk, and "Believe" on The Tonight Show, as well as giving solo concerts in Buffalo, New York; Atlantic City, New Jersey; and Pittsburgh, in mid-December 2011. Evancho sang 14 songs in each of these concert appearances, including songs from all three of her albums, mixing Christmas music with her classical crossover repertoire. On this mini-tour, Evancho invited 20-year-old Canadian tenor Christopher Dallo, who had beaten her in the 2009 David Foster talent search contest, to sing three solos, and to duet with her in The Prayer.

Evancho released music videos of three songs from the album.

== Reception ==
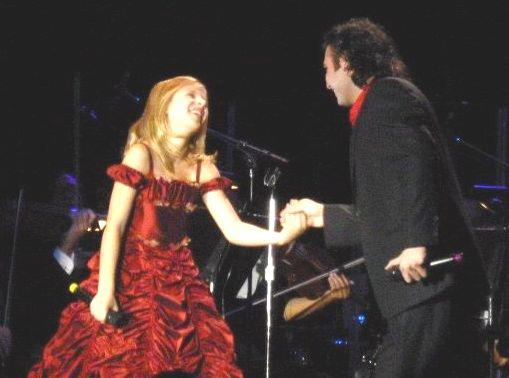
Evancho in her "Heavenly Christmas" concert at Atlantic City, December 2011, with Christopher Dallo

The album entered the Billboard Classical Albums chart at No. 1, the Holiday Albums chart at No. 3, and the Billboard 200 at No. 16, peaking at No. 11 there in its sixth week of release. It rose to No. 9 on the Canadian Albums chart in its fifth week. Allmusic's review gives the album three stars, commenting, "while the set leans hard on standard Christmas fare ... Evancho's vocals are impressive as always, and the arrangements are mostly tasteful, with only occasional moments of bombast that threaten to wash the pint-sized soprano out to sea." The Salt Lake City Tribune rated the album "A−", writing: "some of us are still taken aback when we hear such a strong, womanly voice float out of an 11 year-old child. ... Her best offering is the cherubic 'Believe'." The New Straits Times wrote, "She brings a certain poignancy to 'The First Noel', 'What Child Is This', 'Believe' ... and 'Walking In The Air'. ... The child’s voice is a wonder!"

In its 2011 year-end charts, Billboard ranked Heavenly Christmas as the No. 4 best selling Classical Album for the year. Yahoo reported that the album was the third best selling Christmas album of 2011. As of January 2012, over 300,000 copies of Heavenly Christmas had been sold in the U.S. Idolator.com readers chose Evancho's "Believe" as their "Favorite Christmas Song" for 2011.

Beginning the 2012 Christmas season early, The Philippine Star's reporter recommended the album, praising Evancho's "crystal clear voice. ... Sweet and sentimental is her take on the standards. ... Jackie now sings with a laidback sophistication quite mature for her age. ... her singing has acquired polish and will get even better as she grows up." In October 2012, the album was released by retailers other than Walmart and rejoined the Billboard Holiday Albums chart at No. 9. The album also rejoined the Billboard 200 chart, rising to No. 62 on that chart in December 2012. Billboard ranked Heavenly Christmas as the No. 2 Classical album in the U.S. in 2012 and No. 41 on the 2012 Canadian Albums chart.

== Track listing ==
No.	Title	Writer(s) and arranger	Length
1.	"I'll Be Home for Christmas"	Kim Gannon, Walter Kent and Buck Ram; arranged by Rob Mounsey	3:53
2.	"The First Noel"	Traditional; arranged by Ryan Shore	4:40
3.	"Away in a Manger"	Traditional; arranged by Ryan Shore	3:16
4.	"Believe"	Glen Ballard and Alan Silvestri; arranged by Rob Mounsey	4:10
5.	"White Christmas"	Irving Berlin; arranged by Rob Mounsey	3:57
6.	"What Child Is This"	William Chatterton Dix; arranged by Ryan Shore	3:30
7.	"O Come All Ye Faithful"	Traditional; arranged by Ryan Shore	3:49
8.	"O Little Town of Bethlehem"	Lewis Redner and Phillips Brooks; arranged by Rob Mounsey	4:01
9.	"Walking in the Air"	Howard Blake; arranged by Ryan Shore	3:33
10.	"Ding Dong Merrily on High"	George Woodward; arranged by Ryan Shore	3:01
Total length:			37:50

== Charts ==
=== Weekly charts ===
Chart (2011)	Peak position
Canadian Albums (Billboard)	9
US Billboard 200	11
US Top Classical Albums (Billboard)	1
US Top Holiday Albums (Billboard)	3

=== Year-end charts ===
Chart (2011)	Position
US Top Classical Albums (Billboard)	4

Chart (2012)	Position
Canadian Albums (Billboard)	41
US Billboard 200	105
US Top Classical Albums (Billboard)	2
