= Dina Fanai =

- Born: Dina Fanai
- Origin: New York City, United States
- Genres: Pop
- Occupations: Singer, songwriter, producer, composer
- Instruments: Piano, vocals

Dina Fanai (born in New York City) is an American singer, producer, songwriter and composer.

== Early life ==
Fanai started studying ballet and voice at an early age, attending the Children's Ballet Theatre and the School of American Ballet. She grew up on the upper west side of Manhattan and attended the La Guardia High School of Music and Art then studied acting at the Academy of Dramatic Arts. From age 8 to 16 she performed at the Lincoln Center, the New York State Theater, Avery Fisher Hall, Alice Tully Hall, City Center, Carnegie Hall, Felt Forum, and the Fashion Institute Of Technology among others.

== Career ==
During the span of her career Dina has worked with Trans-Siberian Orchestra, Foreigner (band), Jackie Evancho, Il Volo, Sebastien Izambard Flux Quartet, Sirius String Quartet, Dave Eggar, Rebekah Del Rio, DEORO, Sasha Lazard, Gil Goldstein, Tina Turner, Morley, The Ahn Trio, Joan Jett, Lucy Woodward, Tom Chu, Adrienne Warren, Perks Dance Theatre, Attack Theatre, Caitlin Moe, Keith Miller, Acrassicauda, Ted Mason, Leni Stern, Lucia Micarelli, Eden Espinosa, Haale, Dave Schommer, Jeff Scott Soto, Chloe Lowery, Alex Alexander, Lucia Micarelli, Anna Phoebe, Heather Holley Svante Henreyson, Park Stickney, Jeff Golub, Johnny Rosh, Eran Tabib, Everette Bradley, Randi Driscoll, Blowup Hollywood, Rachael Sage, Phillip Hamilton, Rob Evan, Sylvia Tosun, Stephanie Winters, Cliff Eberhardt, Nancy Magarill, Lorraine Ferro, Swampbytche, Edible Red, Rebekah Del Rio, Joe Lynn Turner, Heather Holley, Eran Tabib, Joel Hoekstra, Johnny Reinhard and Benior among others.

Dina independently six albums including: "Remembering The Vision", "Vision", "I Believe", "My Prayer", "Legends" and “Hidden”. Dina and Robert Kinkel are the co-creators of the project "CINEMA 12", which was featured on Tina Turner's platinum selling album "BEYOND: Buddhist and Christian Prayers" with production from Bob Kinkel, Dave Eggar and Nik Chinboukas. CINEMA 12 also created the soundtrack to the Sci-fi thriller "Time Warrior" to be released 2012. In 2002 and 2003 Dina toured as a singer with the multi-platinum selling arena rock band Trans-Siberian Orchestra and then became head of artist development for the band for 10 years under Night Castle Management company. She has also led tours and educational programs in the US, Southeast Asia and Japan.

Dina composed and was a featured vocalist on Grammy nominated artist Dave Eggar's album "Kingston Morning", released in 2011 on Domo Records. She has also written and produced for other projects with Dave Eggar that were released through Universal Records USA and Columbia/Japan Records. She produced the record "Love Hurts/ Love Heals" for acclaimed singer Rebekah Del Rio, which was released on November 11, 2011. Fanai was the lead vocalist and composer of the award-winning dance rock opera "Games Of Steel" with "Attack Theatre" and Grammy Nominated artist Dave Eggar. Fanai is co-founder of The Myth Of Red Creative Salon Series, with Sasha Lazard and Dave Eggar. She has produced benefit concerts and charity events supporting causes such as Worldwide Orphans Foundation, Juvenile Diabetes, The Children's Aid Society, The Associated Blind Foundation, Sounds Of Hope, and The Coalition Of Battered Woman's Advocates. Fanai is a co-founder of the artist development company D.R.E.A.M. Artist Productions with multi-platinum selling songwriter/arranger/producer Heather Holley who is known for her role in launching singer Christina Aguilera's career. She has hosted and co-hosted the Songwriters Hall Of Fame, songwriters nights and workshops in venues throughout New York City for over 10 years.

In mid02016, Dina did artist development, talent coordination and stage direction for ROCKTOPIA – A Classical Revolution, which was filmed in Budapest for a PBS special and a limited Broadway run in Spring 2018 with guest appearances by Pat Monahan (Train), Dee Snider Twisted Sister and Robin Zander Cheap Trick. Dina was also brought on as vocal producer for Sébastien Izambard from the operatic pop musical quartet Il Divo.

In 2017, Dina produced and arranged Jackie Evancho's album Someday at Christmas which reached No. 1 on the Billboard charts – including the Stevie Wonder classic, title track, "Someday at Christmas" as well as two versions of "Little Drummer Boy", one featuring Il Volo. Dina then co-wrote and produced four songs on Jackie's first ever pop album, Two Hearts, also hitting No. 1 on Billboard.

In 2017 Dina was brought on by the legendary band Foreigner (band) as choir master, arranger and featured vocalist for their 40th anniversary orchestral show, television special, DVD and CD, remaining No. 1 on Billboard for four weeks and top 10 for over eight months.

Dina founded her company, One Vision Music (OMV) for the sole purpose of using music as a powerful force to create positive change in the world. Through OVM and new platform Power of Music, Global which she co-founded with Robert Kinkel, she continues to produce concerts and recordings supporting a wide variety of causes including LGBT, people with disabilities, woman's equality and empowerment, homeless children, climate change and animal rights. In December 2017, she teamed up with Daniel's Music Foundation (an organizational which provides free music programs for anyone with a disability) in launching the "POWER of MUSIC" Concert Series – A transformational experience of live performances that explores and celebrates the powerful healing force of music.

Most recently Dina has released 2 of the 12 songs and videos ("Fearless" & "Be Your Own Beautiful") from her most current project AVALONA. This music is part of a larger immersive theatrical experience which is currently in pre-production, to be launched Spring 2021.

Dina continues to do artist development and A&R for major label recording acts and arena tours.

== Accolades ==
Dina Fanai has received grants and awards from The National Endowment for the Arts, The Songwriter's Hall of Fame, Pennsylvania Council Of the Arts, The National Academy of Popular Music, The USA Songwriters Competition and Guild and John Michael Kohler Arts Center.

== Discography ==
1999 – "Remembering The Vision"
Producer/ Songwriter/ Vocalist
Dina Fanai
One Vision Music
https://music.apple.com/us/album/remembering-the-vision/15962085

2004 – "I Believe"
Producer/ Songwriter/ Vocalist
Dina Fanai
One Vision Music
https://web.archive.org/web/20110817034853/http://www.dinafanai.com/os/store.htm

2004 – "Vision"
Producer/ Songwriter/ Vocalist
One Vision Music
https://music.apple.com/us/album/vision/65370812

2004 – "The Lost Christmas Eve"
Vocalist / Artist Development
Trans Siberian Orchestra
Atlantic Records
https://web.archive.org/web/20120328035342/http://www.trans-siberian.com/discography/lost_xmas_eve.php

004 – "Angelic Embrace"
Associate Producer/ Composer
Dave Eggar
Domo Records
http://music.yahoo.com/dave-eggar/albums/angelic-embrace--19818207

2004 – "The Christmas Trilogy"
Vocalist / Artist Development
Trans-Siberian Orchestra
Atlantic Records
https://web.archive.org/web/20120313041153/http://www.trans-siberian.com/discography/xmas_trilogy.php

2005 – "Left Of Blue"
Producer/ Composer
Dave Eggar
Domo Records
https://www.amazon.com/Left-Blue-Dave-Eggar/dp/B000A2H6NW

2006 – "My Prayer"
Producer/ Songwriter/ Vocalist
Dina Fanai
One Vision Music
https://music.apple.com/us/album/my-prayer/206113138

2009 – "Tribute"
Vocalist
James Lewis
Self Released
http://www.jameslewismusicshop.com/

2009 – "Beyond"
Producer
Tina Turner, Dechen Shak-Dagsay & Regula Curti
Universal Music / Decca Records
https://www.amazon.com/Beyond-Buddhist-Christian-Tina-Turner/dp/B0026298LM

2009 – "Night Castle"
Artist Development/ Vocalist
Trans Siberian Orchestra
Atlantic Records
https://web.archive.org/web/20120328035427/http://www.trans-siberian.com/discography/night_castle.php

2010 – "Kingston Morning"
Composer/ Producer/ Vocalist
Dave Eggar
Domo Music
http://www.domomusicgroup.com/daveeggar/

2011 – "DeoroXx: Xtreme Xover"
Vocalist
Dave Eggar
Domo Music
http://www.domocast.tv/2011/08/dave_eggar_deoro_new_project.html

2011 – "Love Hurts / Love Heals" Songwriter, producer, Background Vocals
Rebekah Del Rio https://www.amazon.com/Love-Hurts-Heals-Explicit/dp/B0063BQN4M/ref=sr_1_1?keywords=Rebekah+del+rio+love+hurts&qid=1585163704&s=dmusic&sr=1-1

2012 – "Dreams of Fireflies"
Artist Development
Trans-Siberian Orchestra
Atlantic Records https://www.amazon.com/Dreams-Fireflies-Christmas-Trans-Siberian-Orchestra/dp/B009AWREEO

2012 – "Look Around"
Vocal Producer
Eden Espinosa https://www.amazon.com/Look-Around-Eden-Espinosa/dp/B00AMUM0ZG

2013 – "Cinema 12"
Vocalist, Producer, Composer
Cinema 12 Music
http://www.cinema12music.com

2014 – "Hidden"
Vocalist, Producer, Songwriter
One Vision Music
http://www.dinafanai.com

2014 – "Legends"
Vocalist, Producer, Songwriter
One Vision Music
http://www.dinafanai.com

2016 – "Someday At Christmas"
Producer, Arranger, Background Vocals
Jackie Evancho
Sony Masterworks
https://www.amazon.com/Someday-at-Christmas-Jackie-Evancho/dp/B01KBGV3GC/ref=sr_1_1?crid=10FA34N9X7R38&keywords=jackie+evancho+someday+at+christmas&qid=1585158460&s=music&sprefix=jackie+evancho+someday%2Cpopular%2C147&sr=1-1

2017 – "Two Hearts"
Producer, Songwriter, Arranger, Background Vocals
Jackie Evancho
Sony Masterworks
https://www.amazon.com/Two-Hearts-Jackie-Evancho/dp/B06WP814X9/ref=sr_1_fkmr0_1?keywords=jackie+evanchotwo+hearts&qid=1585158375&s=music&sr=1-1-fkmr0

2017 – "Rocktopia: A Classical Revolution – Live from Budapest CD"
Talent Coordinator, Artist Development
https://www.amazon.com/Rocktopia-Classical-Revolution-Live-Budapest/dp/B06WGQ2979/ref=sr_1_2?keywords=rocktopia&qid=1585158838&s=music&sr=1-2

2017 – "Rocktopia: A Classical Revolution – Live from Budapest DVD"
Talent Coordinator, Artist Development
https://www.amazon.com/Rocktopia-Classical-Revolution-Live-Budapest/dp/B06XZYHHK7/ref=sr_1_1?crid=23E8KUCDGRSBQ&keywords=rocktopia+live+in+budapest+dvd&qid=1585158671&s=music&sprefix=Rocktopia+%2Cpopular%2C140&sr=1-

2018 – "Foreigner With the 21st Century Symphony Orchestra & Chorus"
Arranger, Vocalist
https://www.amazon.com/21st-Century-Symphony-Orchestra-Chorus/dp/B079P9BVH1

2019 – "FEARLESS"
Vocalist, Producer, Songwriter
Avalona
https://www.avalonamusic.com

2020 – "Be Your Own Beautiful"
Vocalist, Producer, Songwriter
Avalona
https://www.avalonamusic.com

== Sources ==
- http://www.themythofred.com/
- http://dreamartistproductions.com/
- http://www.daveeggarmusic.com/
- http://www.attacktheatre.com/
- http://www.jmkac.org/
- http://rebekahdelrio.com/
- http://www.dinafanai.com
- https://www.foreigneronline.com
- https://rocktopia.com
- https://www.avalonamusic.com
- http://www.jackieevancho.com
- https://www.powerofmusicconcertseries.com
- http://www.ucpnyc.org/site/c.buIWJcNSKnL6G/b.7759045/k.6044/Women_Who_Care_Luncheon.html
