= Aidan Zammit =

Maltese musician (born 1965)

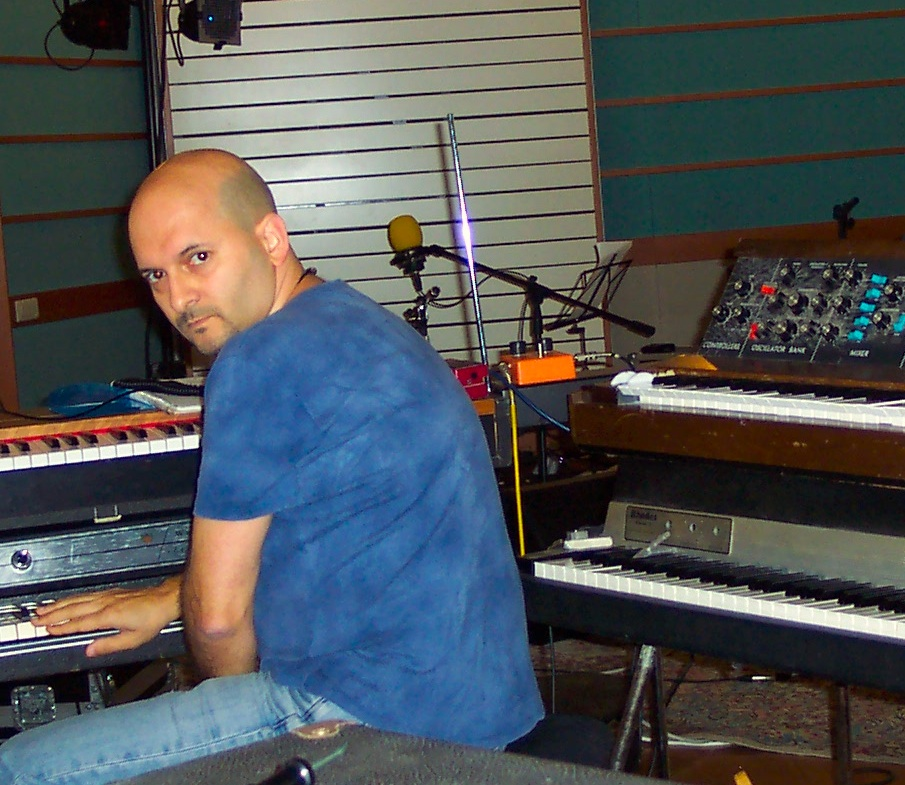

Background information
- Born: Aidan Zammit Lupi; 20 October 1965 (age 60); Sliema, Malta
- Genres: Jazz, R&B, pop, film scores
- Occupations: Musician, songwriter, producer
- Instruments: Keyboards, piano, synthesizer, vocals, guitar
- Years active: 1990–present
- Website: www.zamm.it

Aidan Zammit is a musician from Sliema, Malta. He has lived in Italy since 1985.

== Biography ==
He has worked as a composer, musician and singer with several artists, including Mike Francis, Niccolò Fabi, Andrea Bocelli, Nicola Piovani, Vincenzo Cerami, Claudio Baglioni, Bungaro, Lorenzo Feliciati, Simone Cristicchi, Antonello Venditti, Marco Mengoni, Gianni Togni, Angelo Branduardi, Il Volo and Vocintransito. He performed in Khartoum with Fabi, in the first pop concert ever to be held by a western artist in Sudan.

At the Festival di Sanremo in 2004 he arranged and conducted the song “Guardastelle”, awarded for the Best Music that year.

In 2009 Zammit joined Goblin (band), a group renowned for its movie soundtracks.

With Mike Francis (musician) and Mario "Mari-One" Puccioni, Zammit has been a member of “Mystic Diversions”, with 6 albums and compositions featured in over 130 compilations published worldwide.

He has performed and written for movie, television and theatre soundtracks, including films by Roberto Benigni and Warner Bros. cartoons.

In 2009 the album "Fly Away - The music of David Foster" was released and features Zammit as keyboardist and backing vocalist on three tracks. The songs feature international artists such as Jay Graydon, John "JR" Robinson, Neil Stubenhaus, Robbie Dupree and Arnold McCuller.

In 2010 he toured as keyboard player with X-Factor winner Marco Mengoni.

In 2012 and 2013 he toured the US and Latin America as pianist and musical director with Il Volo.

In 2013 he toured the US with Goblin (band)

Since 2014 he has toured with Claudio Baglioni and Gianni Morandi on keyboards, guitar and flute.

In 2017 he has toured with Goblin (band) again in Europe and North America.

In 2019 his first solo album "Exposed" was released.

== Discography ==
=== Solo projects ===
- 2019 - Exposed

=== Mystic Diversions ===
- 2001 - Crossing the liquid mirror
- 2003 - Beneath another sky
- 2004 - Colours
- 2006 - From the distance
- 2007 - Wave a little light
- 2010 - Angel Soul
- 2015 - Renaissance

=== Goblin Rebirth ===
- 2015 - Goblin Rebirth - Relapse Records
- 2016 - Alive - Black Widow Records

=== Claudio Baglioni and Gianni Morandi ===
- 2015 - Capitani Coraggiosi

=== Bungaro ===
- 2003 - Io no (film) soundtrack
- 2004 - L'attesa
- 2010 - Arte

=== Niccolò Fabi ===
- 2003 - La Cura del Tempo Tour Live dvd
- 2006 - Novo Mesto (album)
- 2006 - Evaporare - Live al Music Village
- 2006 - Dischi volanti 1996-2006
- 2007 - Dentro
- 2008 - Live in Sudan

=== Mike Francis ===
- 2007 - Inspired

=== Andrea Bocelli ===
- 2001 - The Homecoming

=== Lorenzo Feliciati ===
- 2004 - Upon my head
- 2006 - Live at European Bass Day

=== Pope John Paul II ===
- 2004 - Never terrorism, never war

=== Patrizia Laquidara ===
- 2004 - Indirizzo portoghese

=== Manuela Zanier ===
- 2008 - Esercizi di stile

=== Sei Suoi Ex ===
- 1992 - Fino a dove inizia il mare
- 1992 - Paola non è un uomo
- 1993 - Cuccu bare

=== Roberto Kunstler ===
- 2005 - Kunstler

=== Funky Company ===
- 1997 - Everytime

== Film Scores ==
=== Aidan Zammit ===
- 2006 - La voce di Pasolini

=== Music written with Bungaro ===
- 2002 - Bbobbolone
- 2005 - Compito in Classe
- 2006 - Con la Mano di Dio
- 2008 - La Canarina Assassinata

=== Performing with Nicola Piovani ===
- 2002 - Das Sams
- 2002 - Pinocchio
- 2002 - Nowhere
- 2002 - Resurrezione
- 2002 - Il nostro matrimonio è in crisi
- 2003 - Gli Indesiderabili
- 2004 - Luisa Sanfelice
- 2004 - Maigret
- 2004 - L'équipier
- 2005 - The Tiger and the Snow
- 2005 - Matilde
- 2006 - Fauteuils d'orchestre
- 2006 - The Robber Hotzenplotz
- 2006 - Fascisti su Marte

=== Performing with Pasquale Filastò ===
- 1996 - La bruttina stagionata
- 1997 - Figurine
- 2000 - Roberto Rossellini: Frammenti e battute
- 2006 - L'impresario delle Smirne
- 2007 - Hermano

== Theatre Soundtracks ==
=== Aidan Zammit and Vincenzo Cerami ===
- 2005 - Vincenzo Cerami legge L'Ecclesiaste
- 2007 - Le mille e una notte
- 2008 - Viaggio nel Silenzio

== Television Soundtracks ==
=== Aidan Zammit and Monica Ward ===
- 2002 - Baby Looney Tunes
- 2002 - Baby Looney Tunes - una straordinaria avventura
- 2003 - Le avventure di Pollicino e Pollicina
- 2003 - Grandma Got Run Over by a Reindeer
- 2004 - Gnomo Superstar - Le superchicche
- 2005 - Baby Looney Tunes

=== Others ===
- 2005 - Kong - Re di Atlantis
