= O Holy Night (Jackie Evancho EP) =

EP by Jackie Evancho
- Released: November 16, 2010
- Recorded: 2010
- Genres: Classical, Christmas
- Label: Syco

Jackie Evancho chronology
Prelude to a Dream (2009)	O Holy Night (2010)	Dream With Me (2011)

O Holy Night is the official debut Christmas EP by American child singer Jackie Evancho. The album was released on November 16, 2010, only two months after Evancho rose to prominence as a finalist on the reality TV show America's Got Talent. Evancho was ten years old when this EP was released.

The album was certified platinum in the U.S. and Canada. Its success made Evancho the top-selling debut artist for 2010, the youngest solo artist ever to debut in the top 10, the youngest person to ever have a US Top 3 album and the youngest solo artist ever to go platinum.

== Background ==
The album includes a two-disc set: a CD with four recorded tracks and a DVD with 12 minutes of footage of Evancho's performances and America's Got Talent appearances. It also includes an exclusive interview. It was released on November 16, 2010, and reached rank #1 on Amazon's bestsellers in music during pre-orders on October 19, 2010. Evancho released a music video of her singing "Silent Night". The disc was produced by Marius de Vries in only three days in the studio.

== Chart performance ==
O Holy Night debuted at #2 on the Billboard 200 with 239,000 copies sold in its first week and sold 142,000 copies in its second week. It remained in the top five for six weeks. The release made Evancho the top-selling debut artist for 2010, and the youngest solo artist ever to debut in the top 10. The Guinness Book of World Records lists Evancho as "the youngest person to ever have a US Top 3 album". The album also debuted at #1 on the Classical Albums Chart and #2 on the Billboard Holiday Albums chart. As of December 10, 2010, the album was certified platinum by the RIAA with shipments in excess of a million copies in the US, making Evancho the youngest solo artist ever to go platinum. It also debuted at #1 on the Canadian Classical Albums Chart. In January 2011, after the Christmas season, sales of the album fell, and it left the Billboard 200 and Holiday charts.

Professional ratings
Review scores
Source	Rating
Allmusic	2.5/5 stars

By May 2011, the album had sold over 1,000,000 copies in the US. In October 2011, with the approach of Christmas, the album's sales increased; it re-entered the Billboard Holiday Albums chart at #10, and in November 2011 it re-entered the Billboard 200 chart, reaching #60, and moved up to #8 on both the Billboard Catalogue Albums chart and Holiday Albums chart.

In its 2011 year-end charts, Billboard ranked O Holy Night at the top of its Classical Albums chart for the year. It also ranked the album as the #15 best selling album of 2011 in the U.S. and as the #31 Canadian Album of 2011. The album was listed on the Billboard 200 for a total of 30 weeks, the Holiday Albums chart for a total of 44 weeks, and the Classical Albums chart for a total of 84 weeks.

== Promotion ==
Evancho's first stop in promoting the album was on The Tonight Show with Jay Leno on September 23, 2010, where she gave her first late-night talk show interview with Jay Leno. She appeared on The Oprah Winfrey Show on October 19, 2010, the day of the EP's release, along with singers Susan Boyle and Debby Boone. She sang one of the songs from the album, "Pie Jesu", during the show. Among several other talk shows and QVC appearances, Evancho performed on The Today Show on November 9, 2010, The View on November 15, 2010, Martha Stewart Living on November 30, 2010, and the Fox & Friends Christmas special, broadcast on December 24 and 25, 2010, each of which appearances also featured interviews.

Evancho also performed the title song from the album in the My Macy's Holiday Parade presented by WPXI in Pittsburgh on November 27, 2010. On November 30, 2010, Evancho sang "O Holy Night" and, together with Katherine Jenkins, "Silent Night", on NBC's Rockefeller Center Christmas Tree lighting special, "Christmas in Rockefeller Center". On December 9, 2010, Evancho performed at the National Christmas Tree lighting event in Washington, D.C., singing "O Holy Night", with President Obama and his family present. She performed "Pie Jesu" on the 27th annual Disney Parks Christmas Day Parade, which aired on ABC television on December 25, 2010. Evancho sang Pie Jesu during Muhammad Ali's "Celebrity Fight Night" charity event in Phoenix, Arizona, on March 19, 2011.

== Track listing ==
=== Disc One (CD) ===
1. "Silent Night" (3:32)
2. "Panis Angelicus" (3:46)
3. "O Holy Night" (4:40)
4. "Pie Jesu" (2:57)

=== Disc Two (DVD) ===
1. "Panis Angelicus" (YouTube Audition)
2. "O Mio Babbino Caro" (From America's Got Talent)
3. "Time to Say Goodbye" (From America's Got Talent)
4. "Pie Jesu" (From America's Got Talent)
5. "Ave Maria" (From America's Got Talent)
6. "Exclusive interview"

== Charts ==
=== Weekly charts ===
Chart (2010)	Peak position
Canadian Albums (Billboard)	9
US Billboard 200	2
US Top Classical Albums (Billboard)	1

=== Year-end charts ===
Chart (2011)	Position
Canadian Albums (Billboard)	31
US Billboard 200	15
US Top Classical Albums (Billboard)	1

== Certifications ==
Region	Certification	Certified units/sales
Canada (Music Canada)	Platinum	80,000^{^}
United States (RIAA)	Platinum	1,000,000^{^}
^{^} Shipments figures based on certification alone.
