= Everytime =

2004 single by Britney Spears

Single by Britney Spears

from the album In the Zone
- B-side: "Don't Hang Up"
- Released: May 10, 2004
- Recorded: November 2002
- Studio: Conway (Hollywood, California)
- Genre: Pop
- Length: 3:50
- Label: Jive
- Songwriters: Britney Spears; Annet Artani
- Producer: Guy Sigsworth

Britney Spears singles chronology
"Toxic" (2004)	"Everytime" (2004)	"Outrageous" (2004)

Music video
- "Everytime" on YouTube

"Everytime" is a song by American singer Britney Spears from her fourth studio album, In the Zone (2003). It was released as the third single from In the Zone on May 10, 2004, by Jive Records. After her relationship with Justin Timberlake ended in 2002, Spears became friends with her background singer Annet Artani. They started writing songs together at Spears' house in Los Angeles, and then traveled to Lombardy, Italy, where they collaborated on "Everytime". Musically, it is a piano-driven pop ballad, which lyrically pleas for forgiveness for inadvertently hurting a former lover. Spears composed the music herself and wrote the lyrics with Artani about a romantic breakup.

"Everytime" received universal acclaim from music critics, who praised its lyrics, composition, and Spears' breathy vocals and songwriting, deeming it amongst the highlights of In the Zone. Commercially, it became a global success, topping the charts in five countries, including Australia and the United Kingdom, and reached the top-ten in 16 other markets. In the United States, the single peaked at number 15 on the Billboard Hot 100. Spears did a series of live performances, such as for TV shows Saturday Night Live on NBC and Top of the Pops in the United Kingdom. On her tours, Spears also performed the song on piano in a flower-themed setting at The Onyx Hotel Tour (2004), while suspended on a giant umbrella at The Circus Starring Britney Spears (2009) and in an angel costume at Britney: Piece of Me (2013). The song has been covered by artists like Glen Hansard, Ethel Cain, Kelly Clarkson, Lewis Capaldi, Trisha Paytas, and James Franco in the 2013 film Spring Breakers.

Inspired by the cinematography of the 1995 film Leaving Las Vegas, the accompanying music video for "Everytime" was directed by David LaChapelle. It features Spears as a pop star fighting with a male companion (Stephen Dorff) as she is hounded by paparazzi. She starts to drown in her bathtub after bleeding from a head wound. In the hospital, doctors fail to resuscitate her, while simultaneously a child is born in the next room (implying she has been reincarnated). The original concept had Spears kill herself from a drug overdose, but that part of the plot was removed after it received criticism from organizations such as Kidscape, who perceived it as a glamorization of suicide. Critics took note of the video for its religious references to The Passion of the Christ, Kabbalah and stigmata, as well as for foreshadowing Spears' own struggles with fame.

== Background and writing ==
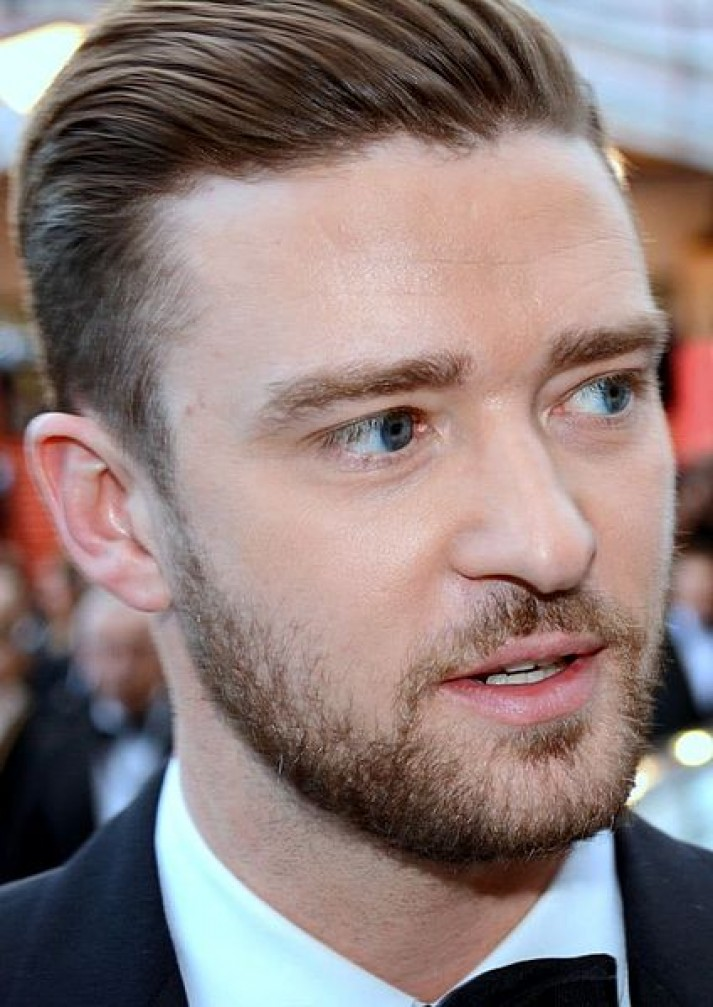
"Everytime" was, at the time, allegedly about Spears's ex-partner Justin Timberlake.

Britney Spears' three-year relationship with singer-songwriter Justin Timberlake ended in 2002 after months of speculation. In November 2002, Timberlake released the song "Cry Me a River" as the second single from his debut solo album Justified. The song's music video featured a Spears lookalike and fueled the rumors that she had been unfaithful to him. "Cry Me a River" is often credited as being the song that propelled Justified onto the charts. In September 2001, Annet Artani accepted an offer to become a backing vocalist for Spears's 2001–02 Dream Within a Dream Tour. Her interactions with Spears during most of the tour were limited to small conversations at the gym and vocal warm ups. Artani had begun a relationship with the show's musical director during 2002; however, it was not working out well by the end of the tour. Before the final date in Mexico City, Spears called her and asked about the relationship. Artani told her they were going to break up, to which Spears responded, "Don't worry about it, you're going to hang out with me." Concluded the tour, Spears and Artani began to forge a friendship. Spears invited Artani to her house in Los Angeles. According to Artani, their relationship grew out of their shared romantic experiences at the time. She explained, "Basically, we commiserated because she, at that time, had broken up with Justin [Timberlake]. Maybe like nine months before, but of course it was really fresh in the media. I was just breaking up with this guy, so we kind of like—I think we kind of needed each other." Artani stayed at Spears' house for a few weeks, in which they started writing songs at the piano. Shortly after, they traveled to Lake Como in Lombardy, Italy. Artani added, "It was me and her, her stylist and Felicia, and we had this humongous house to ourselves, and they had a piano there as well."

According to Artani, "Everytime" was written in large part as a response to "Cry Me a River" as well as various radio interviews. Artani explained, "He was getting personal. Here, she had a different type of image, and he was really exposing some stuff that she probably didn't want out there, and in front of her little sister ... I remember her sister being mortified and her being mortified. I'm sure that that really hurt her." The song was also speculated to be a reply to Timberlake's "Never Again", a ballad which appeared on his debut solo album Justified. "Everytime" was recorded at Conway Studios in Los Angeles and mixed at Frou Frou Central in London, England. During an interview with Hip Online, Spears commented about the recording sessions, saying,

"... Like with 'Everytime' I wrote the whole thing from scratch on the piano. Musically there was no track or anything. I was just at my house and I did the whole thing by myself. And then I went and I played it for [Guy Sigsworth] and I just basically told him exactly how I wanted the song to sound. And he was so amazing because there's a lot of producers you tell them things and they don't get it. And you're like oh, that's not the right way. He got it just right. He was amazing. And so that song specifically, you know, I did everything."

Sigsworth was introduced to Spears by Max Martin, whom Robyn had previously introduced to Sigsworth after they worked together on her 2002 album Don't Stop the Music. Martin liked the songs Sigsworth had produced for Robyn and suggested inviting Spears to the studio. Sigsworth told Consequence, "She just came around to the place where I'd worked on the Frou Frou material, and initially I wasn't quite sure what to do because she's famous for her more dance-y songs, and I'm not. But it all turned out great." He recalled that Spears had become quite accustomed to playing the piano at that point; she played the root chords and he offered suggestions on how to complete them. He said, "We both knew where [the song] needed to go, so I could color it in after she'd sung the main vocal. I love it when I get the vocal very early on, and I'm free to experiment with arrangement ideas while always hearing that final vocal."

"Everytime" was one of the first songs finished for In the Zone, previewed on May 30, 2003, to Quddus Philippe of MTV at Battery Studios in New York City. It was registered with the U.S. Copyright Office on April 26, 2003, under the title of "Everytime I Try" and SRU000530591 registration number with a given recording year of 2002. Spears named it the most personal song on the album along with "Touch of My Hand", explaining, "It's one of the songs that when you hear, it's like the kind of song when you go to heaven. It kind of takes you away. You know, it takes you in to a very cool consciousness I think."

Annet Artani, who co-wrote the song with Spears, was managed at the time by American music manager Andrian Adams. In lieu of a management fee, Artani gave Adams a 7 per cent share of the song's publishing rights. In October 2005, Adams listed the share for auction on eBay, with bidding reported at £15,100 at press time. He subsequently sold the share to a music industry executive for £97,300 (approximately $168,870). Spears' lawyers attempted to stop the auction, but Adams invited them to submit a competing offer, which did not materialise.

== Composition ==
"Everytime"
A 20-second sample of "Everytime", with Spears singing the chorus over a piano accompaniment.

"Everytime" is a pop ballad. It begins with a music box introduction accompanying Spears' breathy vocals, which build from soft to strong through the song. According to the sheet music published at Musicnotes.com by Universal Music Publishing Group, "Everytime" is composed in the key of E♭ major, with a tempo of 110 beats per minute. Spears' vocal range spans from the low note of A♭_{3} to the high note of E♭_{5}. "Everytime" lyrics are a plea for forgiveness for inadvertently hurting a former lover. In the song, the singer explains she feels unable to continue in lines such as "Everytime I try to fly I fall / Without my wings I feel so small". Jennifer Vineyard of MTV compared the song lyrically to another ballad from In the Zone, "Shadow", since they both speak "about how reminders of a lover can still linger after he's gone." During an interview with Jennifer Vineyard of MTV, Spears said about "Everytime", "It's about heartbreak, it's about your first love, your first true love. That's something all people can relate to, because you all have that first love that you think you're going to be with the rest of your life." When asked if "Everytime" was about Timberlake during an interview with Diane Sawyer in PrimeTime, she responded "I'll let the song speak for itself." In 2023, in excerpts from Spears' memoir The Woman in Me, Spears revealed that she became pregnant with Timberlake's child in 2000 and had undergone an abortion, leading many to speculate the song was about said abortion. However, the co-writer Annet Artani disputed this claim, stating the song was written mostly about a breakup Artani herself had gone through.

== Critical reception ==
"Everytime" received widespread acclaim from music critics, who complimented its lyrical content and Spears' breathy vocals, while others deemed it a standout track on In the Zone. Gavin Mueller of Stylus Magazine considered "Everytime" to be the best track on In the Zone, explaining "it is just a spare piano ballad, simple yet effectively fragile". Ali Fenwick of The Johns Hopkins News-Letter complimented Spears' songwriting and added the song "shows a glimmer of the talent that hides behind the robotic, synthed-out vocals on the rest of the album". Christy Lemire of MSNBC called it "actually a pretty tune" and named it the best ballad in Greatest Hits: My Prerogative. Jason Shawhan of About.com said "Everytime" "screams Single!". For Daniel Megarry from Gay Times, it's "one of the most stunningly heartbreaking songs of all time". Nayer Nissim, from PinkNews, wrote that "despite some limp efforts scattered around her albums, Britney can actually do some utterly compelling and heartbreaking ballads, and this is her very best. Beautiful, disarming, and emotionally raw". Digital Spy's Alim Kheraj praised its "lullaby-like production, wonderfully simple piano riff and confessional lyrics".

For Alex Macpherson from The Guardian, it's one of the best examples of Spears' "distressing vulnerability" as well as her fifth best song; "one of Britney's oddest curveballs was following the gleaming banger 'Toxic', with its polar opposite. [...] ['Everytime'] is a rare pop hit that seizes attention by shrinking further away". Spence D. of IGN said the song "continues to mine the Zone turf and unleashes what is ostensibly Britney's first mature ballad, at least in terms of being musically staid and stripped of any danceteria sweat and gloss". Linda McGee of RTÉ.ie said that along with In the Zone's "Brave New Girl", they were "individually impressive", but disrupted the direction of the album. David Browne of Entertainment Weekly commented, "With its dainty piano, 'Everytime' plays like a forlorn postmortem on her Justin Timberlake era." In 2016, the staff from Entertainment Weekly placed it at number six on their ranking of Spears' songs and called it "her finest ballad and one of the most emotionally affecting songs of her career". Sterling Clover of The Village Voice called it "a weeper in the best 'Time After Time' (1984) tradition." William Shaw of Blender said that while "Everytime" was not her greatest ballad, the lyrics were "certainly heartfelt". A reviewer from the Huddersfield Daily Examiner stated, "[the] breathy ballad [has] got a stage musical feel to it, but Britney's no Elaine Paige". Sal Cinquemani of Slant Magazine named it along with "Shadow" "two sappy ballads".

== Commercial performance ==
On May 22, 2004, "Everytime" debuted at number 61 on the US Billboard Hot 100, becoming the "Highest Debut" of the week. On July 3, 2004, it peaked at number 15 and stayed in the position for four weeks. The song also peaked at number four on Billboard's Pop Songs chart and at number 17 and number 25 on the Hot Dance Club Songs and Adult Pop Songs charts, respectively. On November 18, 2004, "Everytime" was certified gold by the Recording Industry Association of America (RIAA) selling 500,000 copies. As of July 2010, "Everytime" has sold 469,000 paid digital downloads in the United States. In Canada, the song peaked at number two on the Canadian Singles Chart.

In Australia, "Everytime" debuted at the top of the ARIA Singles Chart on June 28, 2004 – for the week ending date July 4, 2004. It received a gold certification by the Australian Recording Industry Association (ARIA) for shipments over 35,000 units.

In the United Kingdom, "Everytime" debuted at the top of the UK Singles Chart on June 20, 2004 – for the week ending date June 26, 2004 – becoming her second consecutive number one song in Britain from In the Zone, following "Toxic" in March 2004 and her fifth number one overall. According to the Official Charts Company, the song has sold 523,000 copies in Britain.

"Everytime" was also successful elsewhere in Europe, topping the charts in Hungary and Ireland, peaking at number two in France, number three in Sweden and reaching top five positions in Austria, Belgium (Flanders and Wallonia), Czech Republic, Denmark, Germany, Norway, the Netherlands and Poland.

== Music video ==
=== Development and release ===
On March 9, 2004, the treatment of the music video for "Everytime" was released online. It featured Spears as a star hounded by photographers, who eventually kills herself by taking prescription drugs and drowning in a bathtub. The suicide scene was perceived to be Spears's response to rumors that suggested she suffered from a mental disorder. After news of the concept broke, it was criticized by a number of organizations in the United States and the United Kingdom. MTV News' "You Tell Us" received numerous letters from upset viewers, who criticized Spears, saying they perceived the ending as a glamorization of suicide. On March 12, 2004, Spears announced through her label that she had removed the concept, "due to the potential for a fictional accidental occurrence to be misinterpreted as a suicide". She also clarified it was not her intent to present suicide in any sort of positive light.

The video was directed by David LaChapelle and shot on March 13–14, 2004, in Los Angeles. The lighting was described as "saturated, but low and naturalistic" to give the video a cinematic feel, referencing the film Leaving Las Vegas (1995). It premiered on Total Request Live on April 12, 2004. Spears called the show and explained the video explored reincarnation. She added, "It's more like a movie. It's different than anything I've ever done. It's dark, and it shows me in a different light. Of course, I'm going to go back and do dance videos, but I wanted to be inspired and challenged." The video was released through a DVD single in the United Kingdom. An alternate version of the video which only features Spears singing in the white hallway scenes was released on the 2004 DVD Greatest Hits: My Prerogative.

=== Synopsis ===
The video begins with an aerial shot of Las Vegas, showing the Palms Casino Resort and continues with a shot of a marquee hotel that reads "Britney Spears Live from Miami The Onyx Hotel Tour Las Vegas", with a picture of Spears holding a leather strap and referencing her Showtime concert special from Miami. Christian author Eva Marie Everson compared the image to "Madonna doing her own impersonation of Marilyn Monroe". Spears and her boyfriend (played by Stephen Dorff) arrive at the hotel inside a limousine. They sit apart from each other, staring out separate windows. Spears wears a Birmingham Barons cap in these scenes. The boyfriend is talking on his cell phone, and when she attempts to get his attention, he raises his index finger up indicating he is unable to shift his attention to her at that moment. The entrance is full of fans and paparazzi taking pictures. When they leave the car, fans and paparazzi alike act in an extreme way and fights break out in the crowd. While her bodyguards try to protect her, her boyfriend throws magazines at the paparazzi. Stephanie Zacharek of The New York Times compared the shots of the paparazzi with the Jews in the film The Passion of the Christ (2004). During this scene, she gets hit in the head with a camera, and unknowingly gets a wound on her head, but keeps walking.

Inside their hotel room, Spears and her boyfriend start shouting at each other. When he tries to make amends and hug her, she brushes off his attempts and walks away. Her boyfriend gets mad and then throws a vase at the wall while Spears goes into the bathroom, hurling a drink at the mirror. She begins to fill the bathtub and remove her clothes. After this, the video includes intercut scenes of a close-up of Spears singing in a white coat in front of a bright white light. As she lies in the bathtub, a red string, a custom associated with Kabbalah, is seen on her wrist. She touches her head and looks at her hand, realizing she is bleeding from the wound. Writer Jennifer Vineyard of MTV News speculated the blood in her hand is stigmata, but also indicates she did not know where the blood was coming from, meaning Vineyard may have missed the camera hitting Spears' head and that this is a misinterpretation. She loses consciousness in the bathtub and drowns. Shortly after, her boyfriend finds her and tries to resuscitate her. Meanwhile, it is revealed that in the close-up scenes Spears is actually inside a hospital hallway. The video continues with scenes of her being carried into an ambulance and surrounded by photographers, as well as scenes of her being resuscitated by doctors in a hospital bed. The ghost of Spears in a white shirt watches herself in the bed and walks into the next room, where a baby girl is born. Spears is then seen running away from the camera into the light. The music video ends with her rising from under the water, resting her head and smiling, suggesting the whole scene of her death was a dream or a morbid fantasy.

=== Reception ===
Eva Marie Everson wrote that the music video showed the reality "behind the glitz and the glamour". Dominic Fox commented, "Even in its bowdlerised form, the 'Everytime' video presents a moment of existential indecision, a fugue of suicidal ideation in which the singer fantasises about her own death". While reviewing the music video for her 2009 single "If U Seek Amy", James Montgomery of MTV called the music video for "Everytime" "underrated". Rolling Stone in their 2009 article "Britney Spears: The Complete Video Guide", called it "horribly prophetic and depressing" and added that the clip foreshadowed Spears's struggles with fame and mental instability during 2007 and 2008.

== Live performances ==
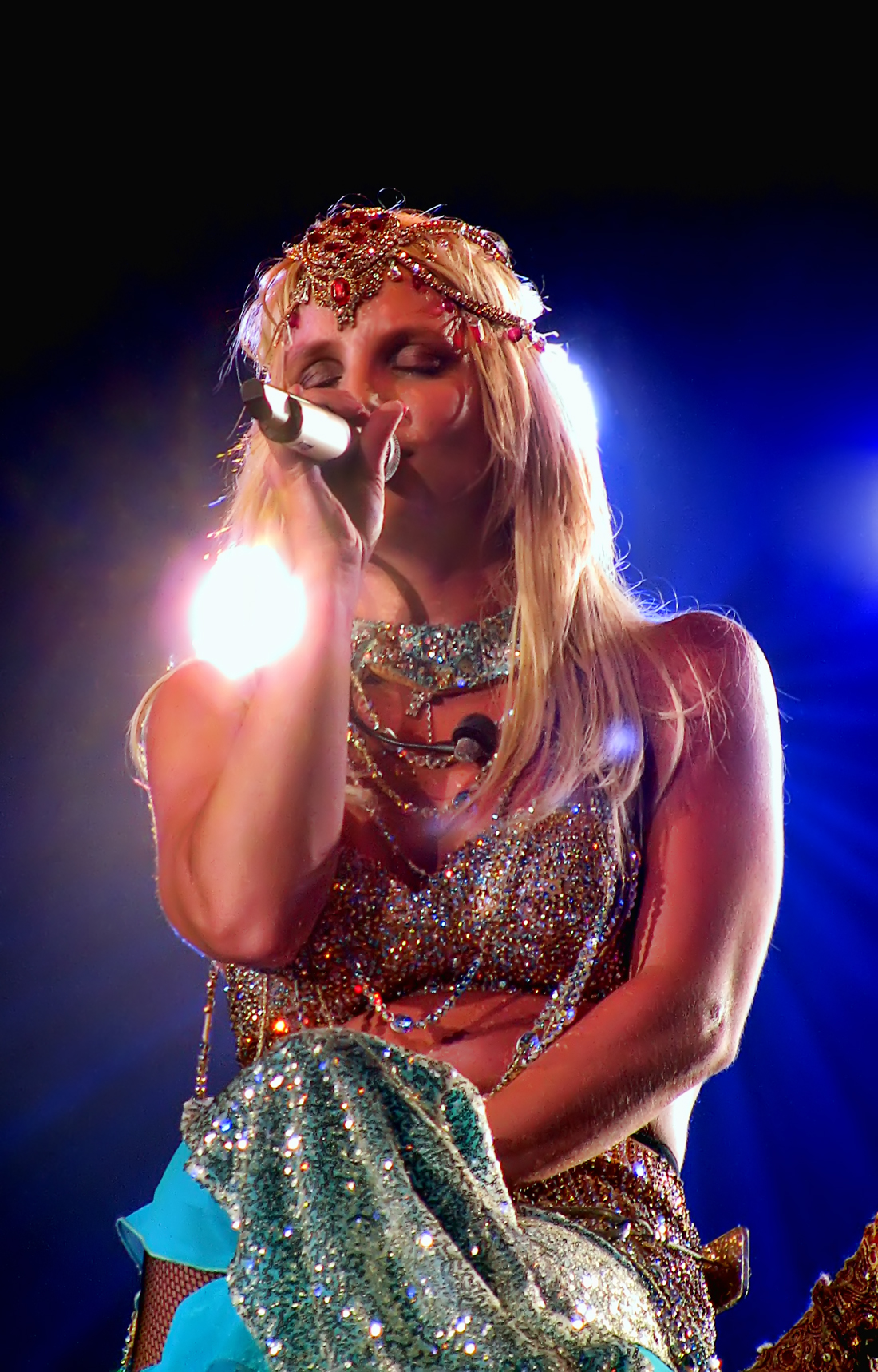
Spears performing "Everytime" at The Circus Starring Britney Spears, February 2009

On October 18, 2003, "Everytime" was performed by Spears for the first time during the twenty-ninth season of the American comedy show Saturday Night Live. She also performed it at Britney Spears: In the Zone, a concert special that aired in ABC on November 17, 2003. "Everytime" was also performed by Spears at 2004's The Onyx Hotel Tour. Before the tour began, Spears said that it was one of the songs she was looking most forward to perform, explaining, "I really think I'm talking to everyone when I perform 'Everytime'". It was the first song of the third act, titled "Mystic Garden". It began with a video interlude in which Spears walked into a garden wearing a rainbow-colored dress and sat in a flower-covered piano. As the video ended, it was revealed that she was sitting onstage in a similar setting. She started the performance talking to the audience about the media coverage of her personal life. She played the piano and sang until the second verse, where she stood up and walked to the center of the stage to continue the performance. Neil Strauss of The New York Times commented, "It was the only song that she appeared to sing unaccompanied by backing tapes". Kelefa Sanneh of Blender called it the best performance of the show. "Everytime" was also performed by Spears at the British music chart show Top of the Pops in June 2004.

Spears also performed the song at 2009's The Circus Starring Britney Spears. "Everytime" was the only song that was not included in the released setlist, and was added as a surprise. It was the sixth and last song of the second act, titled "House of Fun (Anything Goes)". After a Bollywood-inspired performance of "Me Against the Music" from In the Zone, Spears sat on a giant umbrella in the middle of the stage and briefly talked to the audience. She performed "Everytime" while the umbrella was lifted into the air. Spears included "Everytime" on the setlist for her Las Vegas residency, Britney: Piece of Me. After a brief interlude, descended from the ceiling as a "giant, white-winged angel". After a snow shower of confetti, the song transitioned into "...Baby One More Time".

== Cover versions ==
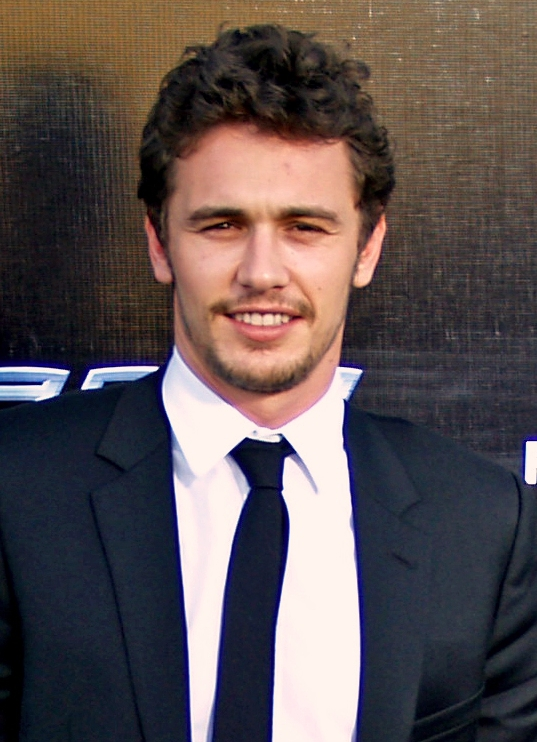
In the 2012 film Spring Breakers, the character of Alien (James Franco) sings "Everytime" on a white grand piano.

"Everytime" was covered by Glen Hansard of Irish band The Frames. It was recorded during a live show at Today FM and released in the 2004 covers compilation, Even Better Than the Real Thing Vol. 2. It was also covered in Mandarin by Taiwanese girl group S.H.E and released on their studio album Encore (2004). Their version was retitled "Bié Shuō Duìbùqǐ" (別說對不起 "Don't Say Sorry"). American pop rock singer Sally Maer also covered "Everytime" to release it on her studio album Bed of Roses (2008). "Everytime" was used during the 2009 Irish production of the 1896 play The Seagull. Jackie Evancho covered the song for her debut album Prelude to a Dream (2009). On August 19, 2010, her version debuted at number three on Billboard's Classical Digital Songs chart. British singer Cher Lloyd covered the song live on series 7 of The X Factor in the United Kingdom in 2010. This caused the song to reenter the top 50 singles chart in the UK. On July 27, 2012, Kelly Clarkson covered the song during the Las Vegas stop of her summer tour, as an audience request. Clarkson had a harpist accompany her during the performance, and told the audience, "This song is one of my favorite songs. [...] I actually prefer [Spears'] version better, because it just sounds really sad, but I'm going to try and do it." Spears approved of Clarkson's cover via her Twitter account, calling it "beautiful". "Everytime" was also covered on the American series Glee fourth season episode "Britney 2.0" in 2012 by the character Marley Rose (played by Melissa Benoist).

"Everytime" was also used in the 2012 American film Spring Breakers, directed by Harmony Korine. The scene begins with the characters of Candy (Vanessa Hudgens), Brittany (Ashley Benson) and Cotty (Rachel Korine) standing in the backyard of the character of Alien (James Franco), who sits at a white grand piano. The girls are wearing My Little Pony ski masks, sparkly pink tiger bathing suits, sweatpants with "DTF" on the rear and shotguns in their hands. They ask Alien to "Play us something sweet. Something uplifting, Something fucking inspiring," to which he responds "One of the greatest singers of all time, and an angel if there ever was one on this earth", before starting to sing "Everytime". As the song transitions from Alien's vocals to Spears' original version we are shown a montage of the girls and Alien robbing other spring breakers at gunpoint. Harmony Korine said about the song,

"I like her music! I think it’s like perfect pop music. That song "Everytime" — I was always taken by that song. It has this real kind of beauty and airlessness and this haunting kind of morose lullaby effect and underneath it there’s some type of hardcore aggression and menace that was really connected to the film in the way that the film deals with the culture of surfaces, this candy-coated neon haze reality. Underneath it, there’s this subtext and feeling of this kind of darkness. It was a connection I felt."

On July 7, 2016, American media personality and singer Trisha Paytas released her cover of the song onto digital download and streaming platforms. On May 24, 2019, American singer Slayyyter released a cover as a digital single. On March 8, 2022, American singer-songwriter Ethel Cain released a cover as part of Spotify Singles, in observance of International Women's Day. On September 26, 2022, Lewis Capaldi covered "Everytime" for a BBC Radio 1 Live Lounge performance; Capaldi released this recorded version as a single on April 11, 2025, debuting at number 36 on the UK Singles Downloads Chart a week later.

"Everytime" was sampled on "Spring Breakers" by Charli XCX from the deluxe edition of her 2024 album, Brat.

== Track listings ==
- European CD single
1. "Everytime" (Album Version) – 3:50
2. "Everytime" (Hi-Bias Radio Remix) – 3:29
- Australian, Canadian, European and Japanese CD maxi single
1. "Everytime" (Album Version) – 3:50
2. "Everytime" (Hi-Bias Radio Remix) – 3:29
3. "Everytime" (Above & Beyond's Radio Mix) – 3:47
4. "Everytime" (The Scumfrog Vocal Mix) – 9:53
- German CD maxi single
1. "Everytime" (Album Version) – 3:50
2. "Everytime" (Hi-Bias Radio Remix) – 3:29
3. "Everytime" (Above & Beyond's Radio Mix) – 3:47
4. "Don't Hang Up" – 4:01
- DVD single
1. "Everytime" – 4:09
2. "Breathe on Me" (Performed on CD:UK) – 3:54
- UK 12-inch vinyl
1. "Everytime" (Hi-Bias Radio Remix) – 3:29
2. "Everytime" (Above & Beyond's Radio Mix) – 3:47
3. "Everytime" (The Scumfrog Vocal Mix) – 9:53
- US 12-inch vinyl (The Remixes)
1. "Everytime" (The Scumfrog Vocal Mix) – 9:53
2. "Everytime" (Valentin Remix) – 3:28
3. "Everytime" (Above & Beyond's Club Mix) – 8:46
4. "Everytime" (Dr. Octavo's Transculent Mixshow Edit) – 5:18

== Credits and personnel ==
Credits adapted from the liner notes of In the Zone.

=== Recording ===
- Vocals recorded at Conway Studios, Los Angeles, California
- Mixed at Frou Frou Central, London

=== Personnel ===
- Britney Spears – lead vocals, songwriting
- Annet Artani – songwriting
- Guy Sigsworth – production, all instruments
- Sean McGhee – mixing, engineering, editing

== Charts ==
=== Weekly charts ===
Weekly chart performance for "Everytime"
Chart (2004–2005)	Peak position
Australia (ARIA)	1
Austria (Ö3 Austria Top 40)	4
Belgium (Ultratop 50 Flanders)	4
Belgium (Ultratop 50 Wallonia)	5
Bolivia (Notimex)	2
Canada (Nielsen SoundScan)	2
Canada CHR/Pop Top 30 (Radio & Records)	6
CIS Airplay (TopHit)	104
CIS Airplay (TopHit) Hi-Bias Radio Remix	30
CIS Airplay (TopHit) Valentin Remix	81
Czech Republic (Rádio – Top 100)	3
Denmark (Tracklisten)	5
European Hot 100 Singles (Billboard)	2
European Radio Top 50 (Billboard)	4
Finland (Suomen virallinen lista)	18
France (SNEP)	2
Germany (GfK)	4
Greece (IFPI)	15
Hungary (Rádiós Top 40)	7
Hungary (Single Top 40)	1
Ireland (IRMA)	1
Mexico (Reforma)	3
Netherlands (Dutch Top 40)	3
Netherlands (Single Top 100)	4
Norway (VG-lista)	3
Poland (ZPAV)	5
Romania (Romanian Top 100)	8
Russia Airplay (TopHit) Hi-Bias Radio Remix	35
Russia Airplay (TopHit) Valentin Remix	85
Scottish Singles Sales (Official Charts)	1
Sweden (Sverigetopplistan)	3
Switzerland (Schweizer Hitparade)	6
Ukraine Airplay (TopHit) Hi-Bias Radio Remix	3
Ukraine Airplay (TopHit) Valentin Remix	34
UK Singles (Official Charts)	1
Uruguay (Notimex)	3
US Billboard Hot 100	15
US Adult Pop Airplay (Billboard)	25
US Dance Club Songs (Billboard)	17
US Dance Airplay (Billboard)	4
US Hot Digital Tracks (Billboard)	7
US Pop Airplay (Billboard)	4
Venezuela (Notimex)	4

=== Year-end charts ===
Year-end chart performance for "Everytime"
Chart (2004)	Position
Australia (ARIA)	72
Austria (Ö3 Austria Top 40)	12
Belgium (Ultratop 50 Flanders)	24
Belgium (Ultratop 50 Wallonia)	21
Brazil (Crowley Broadcast Analysis)	97
CIS (TopHit)	130
France (SNEP)	64
Germany (Media Control GfK)	20
Hungary (Rádiós Top 40)	45
Ireland (IRMA)	6
Netherlands (Dutch Top 40)	63
Netherlands (Single Top 100)	45
Russia Airplay (TopHit) Hi-Bias Radio Remix	138
Sweden (Hitlistan)	8
Switzerland (Schweizer Hitparade)	18
UK Singles (OCC)	18
US Billboard Hot 100	83
US Adult Top 40 (Billboard)	98
US Dance Radio Airplay (Billboard)	22
US Mainstream Top 40 (Billboard)	31

== Certifications ==
Certifications for "Everytime"
Region	Certification	Certified units/sales
Australia (ARIA)	Gold	35,000^{^}
Belgium (BRMA)	Gold	25,000^{*}
Denmark (IFPI Danmark)	Gold	45,000^{‡}
France (SNEP)	Gold	200,000^{*}
Germany (BVMI)	Gold	150,000^{^}
Norway (IFPI Norway)	Platinum	10,000^{*}
Sweden (GLF)	Gold	10,000^{^}
United Kingdom (BPI)	Gold	400,000^{‡}
United Kingdom (BPI) other release	Platinum	600,000^{‡}
United States (RIAA)	Platinum	1,000,000^{‡}
^{*} Sales figures based on certification alone.^{^} Shipments figures based on certification alone.^{‡} Sales+streaming figures based on certification alone.

== Release history ==
Release dates and formats for "Everytime"
Region	Date	Format(s)	Label(s)	Ref.
Germany	May 10, 2004	CD; maxi CD	BMG	
France	May 11, 2004	Maxi CD	Virgin	
United States	May 11, 2004	Contemporary hit radio	Jive	
Germany	May 17, 2004	Mini CD	BMG	
United States	May 25, 2004	12-inch vinyl	Jive	
Japan	May 26, 2004	Maxi CD	Avex Trax	
Canada	June 8, 2004	Maxi CD	BMG	
United States	June 8, 2004	Digital download (EP)	Jive	
France	June 14, 2004	DVD	Virgin	
United Kingdom	June 14, 2004	12-inch vinyl; DVD; maxi CD	RCA	
Australia	June 21, 2004	Maxi CD	BMG	
France	June 29, 2004	12-inch vinyl	Virgin	
France	September 14, 2004	CD	Virgin	

== Bibliography ==
- Everson, Eva Marie (2006). Sex, Lies, and High School. David C. Cook. ISBN 0-7814-4359-8.
- Fox, Dominic (2009). Cold World: The Aesthetics of Dejection and the Politics of Militant Dysphoria. O Books. ISBN 978-1-84694-217-4.
