= Jackie Evancho =

American singer (born 2000)

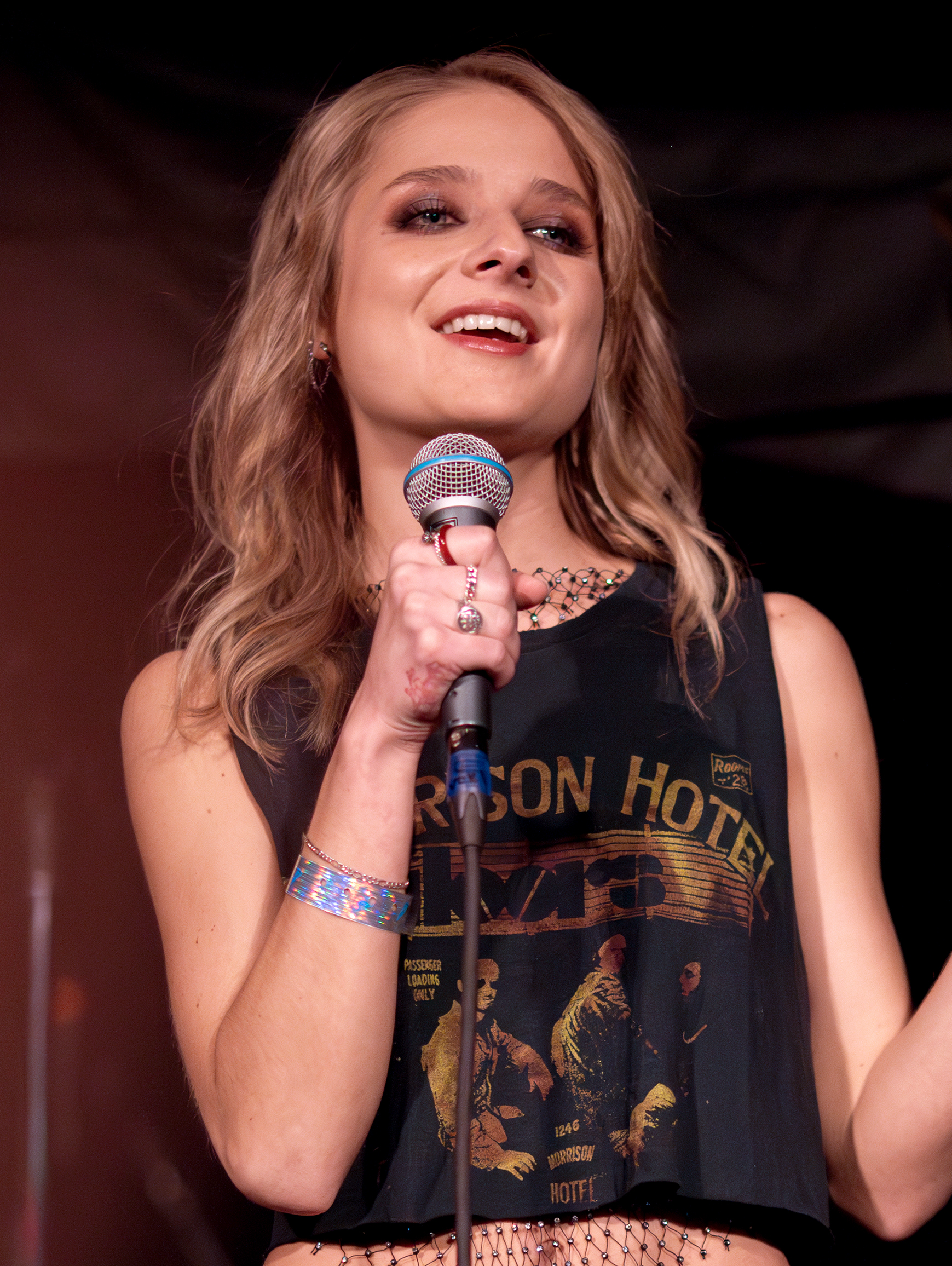
- Evancho performing in 2024

Background information
- Born: April 9, 2000 (age 26); Pittsburgh, Pennsylvania, U.S.
- Genres: Classical crossover; pop
- Occupation: Singer
- Years active: 2009-present
- Labels: Melody Place; JE Touring; Sony Masterworks; Portrait; Columbia; Syco
- Website: jackieevancho.komi.io

Jacqueline Marie Evancho (/iːˈvæŋkoʊ/ ee-VANG-koh; born April 9, 2000) is an American singer who gained wide recognition at an early age, singing primarily classical crossover covers. Since 2009, she has issued nine albums, a platinum-selling EP and two further EPs; three of her discs debuted in the top 10 on the Billboard 200. She has also presented three solo PBS concert specials.

Between 2008 and 2010, Evancho entered talent competitions, sang the US national anthem at a Pittsburgh Pirates baseball game, issued her first album, Prelude to a Dream, and attracted interest on YouTube. In 2010, at the age of ten, she gained wide notice with her 2nd-place finish in the fifth season of America's Got Talent. With the 2010 holiday release of her O Holy Night EP, Evancho became the best-selling debut artist of 2010, the youngest top-10 debut artist in US history and the youngest solo artist ever to go platinum in the US. In 2011, her first full-length album, Dream with Me, debuted at No. 2 on the Billboard 200 chart, and she became the youngest top-5 debut artist in UK history. Billboard ranked Evancho the top Classical Albums Artist of 2011. Later that year, Evancho released a full-length holiday album, Heavenly Christmas, and became the youngest person ever to give a solo concert at Lincoln Center in New York City as part of her first concert tour.

In 2012, Evancho released Songs from the Silver Screen, her third top-10 album debut. In 2013 she headlined benefit concerts at Carnegie Hall and elsewhere. She also appeared in the 2012 Robert Redford film The Company You Keep. Later album releases include Awakening (2014), Someday at Christmas (2016), Two Hearts (2017), The Debut (2019, her eighth consecutive release to reach No. 1 on the US classical albums chart) and Carousel of Time (2022). In 2017, Evancho performed the US national anthem at the first presidential inauguration of Donald Trump and became the youngest person ever to perform a concert series at Café Carlyle. She has given concert tours in support of each of her studio albums. Evancho appeared in 2020 as a contestant on The Masked Singer. In 2024, Evancho released a new EP titled "Solla" which contains singles "Behind My Eyes", "Get Out of My Life", and "Consequences".

== Family and early life ==
Evancho was born on April 9, 2000, in Pittsburgh, Pennsylvania, to Lisa and Michael Evancho. Her father operated a video security business until 2010. She has an older sister Juliet, a younger brother Zachary, and a younger sister Rachel. She was raised in a suburb of Pittsburgh in a Catholic family. Evancho began her education in the Pine-Richland School District, but at various times, after her career began, she received online schooling. She attended Pine-Richland High School, graduating in 2018.

After Evancho saw the film version of the musical The Phantom of the Opera as a young girl, she began singing the songs at home. Her parents did not recognize that her voice was unusual until her first talent competition, which she entered just before her eighth birthday. In that competition, Kean Idol, she placed second. She began taking voice lessons and singing at events, churches and nursing homes, mostly in Pennsylvania. She also started a YouTube channel, sang in the Children's Festival Chorus of Pittsburgh (now Pittsburgh Youth Chorus) during its 2008–09 season, and performed the title role in a 2009 school musical version of Little Red Riding Hood.

In 2009, Evancho competed at the 15th annual USA World Showcase Talent Competition in Las Vegas, where she placed second. At the 2009 Kean Idol contest, she was again runner-up. In other 2009 talent contests, she won the Golden Ribby Award – WonderworldTV and the Talent Quest TV Show (both in Massachusetts). Also in 2009, she sang "Ave Maria" in composer and conductor Tim Janis's PBS television special "Celebrate America" and performed in other concerts and TV shows with Janis, who sought her out after seeing her on YouTube. She made various singing appearances around Pennsylvania in 2009 and 2010, including singing The Star-Spangled Banner at the Pittsburgh Pirates baseball team's 2010 home opener.

== Career ==
=== David Foster and Prelude to a Dream ===
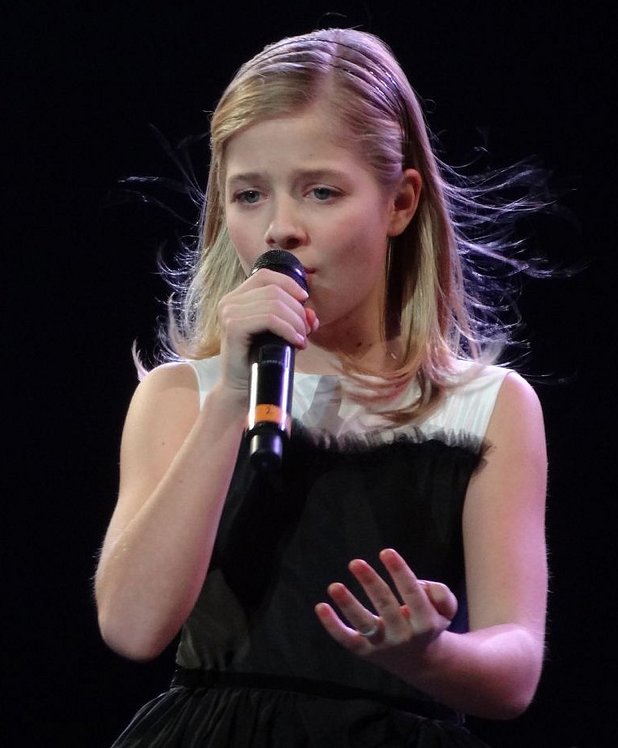
Evancho in her concert with David Foster, December 29, 2011

Evancho first caught record producer David Foster's attention in 2009. She was selected for the regional semifinals of his "Hitman Talent Search Contest", finishing as runner-up, and in October 2009 she sang in the "David Foster & Friends" concert at the Prudential Center in Newark, New Jersey.

In November 2009, Evancho released her independent debut album, Prelude to a Dream. The album featured mainly covers of classical crossover songs such as "Con te partirò", "The Prayer", "To Where You Are", "Concrete Angel" and "Amazing Grace". It debuted on the Billboard 200 at No. 121, and at No. 2 on the Billboard Classical Albums chart, in August 2010, after Evancho's first performance on America's Got Talent. Evancho's parents withdrew the album later that month, citing Evancho's vocal progress since its release.

=== America's Got Talent ===
After two earlier unsuccessful auditions for the show, Evancho was accepted as a contestant on the fifth season of NBC's America's Got Talent (AGT) by placing first in its 2010 YouTube competition. On August 10, 2010, she performed the aria "O mio babbino caro" in the show's quarter-final round, provoking effusive reactions. Afterwards, commentators queried whether her performance had been lip-synched. Evancho sang an impromptu voice exercise to demonstrate her live vocals.

Her semifinal performance was "Time to Say Goodbye". She advanced to the Top 10 round, where she performed "Pie Jesu" from Andrew Lloyd Webber's Requiem and was voted into the Final 4. Her final competition performance, on September 14, 2010, was of Gounod's "Ave Maria". At the AGT season finale, Evancho sang "Time to Say Goodbye" together with guest artist Sarah Brightman; then Evancho was announced as the runner-up, finishing second to singer Michael Grimm. Many viewers and commentators felt that Evancho should have won, and Grimm expressed surprise at the outcome. Up to 16 million viewers watched these performances, and the finale was AGT's highest-rated episode in three years. Evancho was a guest on The Tonight Show a week after the finale, where she sang and gave her first late-night interview, with Jay Leno. Evancho was featured and interviewed in the 2013 book Inside AGT: The Untold Stories of America's Got Talent.

Later in 2010, Evancho performed in 10 cities with the America's Got Talent: Live Tour, signed a record deal with SYCO music and Columbia Records, and performed in Las Vegas with David Foster. From June 2010 until mid-2011, Evancho coached with Yvie Burnett, who has worked with other singers appearing on AGT.

=== O Holy Night ===
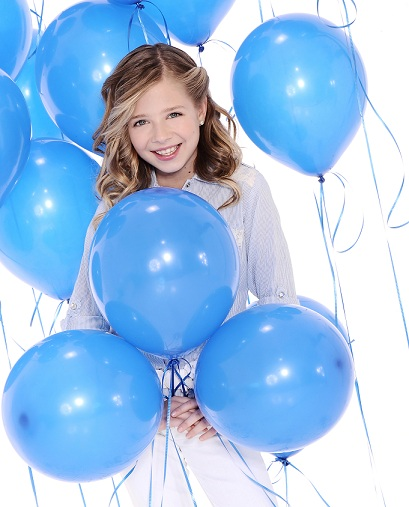
Evancho in February 2011

Evancho's first release on a major record label was a Columbia Records EP titled O Holy Night. It was released on November 16, 2010, and entered the Billboard 200 at No. 2, making Evancho the top-selling debut artist for 2010 and the youngest solo artist ever to debut in the top 10. It also launched at No. 1 on Billboard's Classical Albums chart and No. 2 on Billboard's Holiday Albums Chart. The album sold 239,000 copies in its first week. The EP was certified platinum by the RIAA, making Evancho the youngest solo artist ever to go platinum in the US.

Evancho promoted the album with TV interviews and performances beginning with The Oprah Winfrey Show in October 2010. Her other appearances included performances and interviews on The Today Show, The View, Martha Stewart Living and Fox & Friends. Evancho performed in the 2010 My Macy's Holiday Parade in Pittsburgh, on NBC's Rockefeller Center Christmas Tree lighting special, at the 2010 National Christmas Tree lighting in Washington, D.C., on The Tonight Show and at the 27th annual Disney Parks Christmas Day Parade, on ABC television.

Billboard ranked O Holy Night at No. 1 on its 2011 year-end Classical Albums chart. It also ranked the album as the No. 15 best-selling album of 2011 in the US and the No. 31 Canadian Album of 2011.

=== Dream with Me ===
Evancho's second full-length album, Dream with Me, produced by David Foster for Sony and Syco Music, was released on June 14, 2011. The album debuted at No. 2 on the Billboard 200 chart, reached No. 1 on Billboard's Classical Albums Chart, and was certified gold by the RIAA. With this album, Evancho became the youngest artist ever to debut in the UK in the top 5. The album includes popular songs ("Angel"), classical arias ("Ombra mai fu") and original songs, including the title track, for which Evancho contributed to the lyrics. It also includes duets with Barbra Streisand ("Somewhere") and Susan Boyle ("The Prayer"). Target released a deluxe edition with four bonus tracks. Allmusic gave the album 3-1/2 stars out of five, and USA Today commented that Evancho's "sweet, unblemished vocal tone and slow, careful vibrato hardly betray her young age. ... But Dream's predictable and often bombastic odes to love and faith can undermine the tween's most appealing quality: innocence."

Evancho promoted the album on television and at concerts. Her first solo concert television special for the 2011 PBS Great Performances series consisted of performances of largely the same songs as the album. The special, titled Dream With Me In Concert, was the most broadcast program of the year on the PBS network. It "became one of the most viewed specials in the 38-year-history of the Great Performances series [and] raised record amounts of money for PBS stations." Evancho was the youngest person ever to have a special on the series. The concert was recorded in April 2011 at the John and Mable Ringling Museum of Art and hosted by David Foster, with guest Conrad Tao. The CD/DVD release reached No. 1 on Billboard's Top Music Video chart. Evancho performed "Nessun dorma" as a guest artist at the June 2011 season finale of Britain's Got Talent, and at the September 2011 season finale of America's Got Talent.

In July 2011, the singer began her first solo tour across the United States to promote the album. It consisted of 18 performances with orchestras, including Evancho's New York City concert at Avery Fisher Hall in November 2011, when she was the youngest person ever to sing a solo concert at Lincoln Center. In December she headlined a concert with David Foster and Kenny G in Las Vegas. After a concert in Tokyo in January 2012 with the Tokyo Philharmonic Orchestra, the tour continued in the US and concluded in June 2012.

On its 2011 year-end charts, Billboard ranked Dream With Me as the No. 2 best-selling classical album for the year and as the No. 45 US album of 2011. Dream With Me was listed on the Billboard 200 for 28 weeks and the Classical Albums chart for 74 weeks. Billboard ranked Dream With Me In Concert the No. 21 music video album of 2011 and the No. 16 music video album of 2012. Dream With Me In Concert was ranked on the Billboard.biz Top Music Video chart for 64 weeks.

=== Heavenly Christmas ===
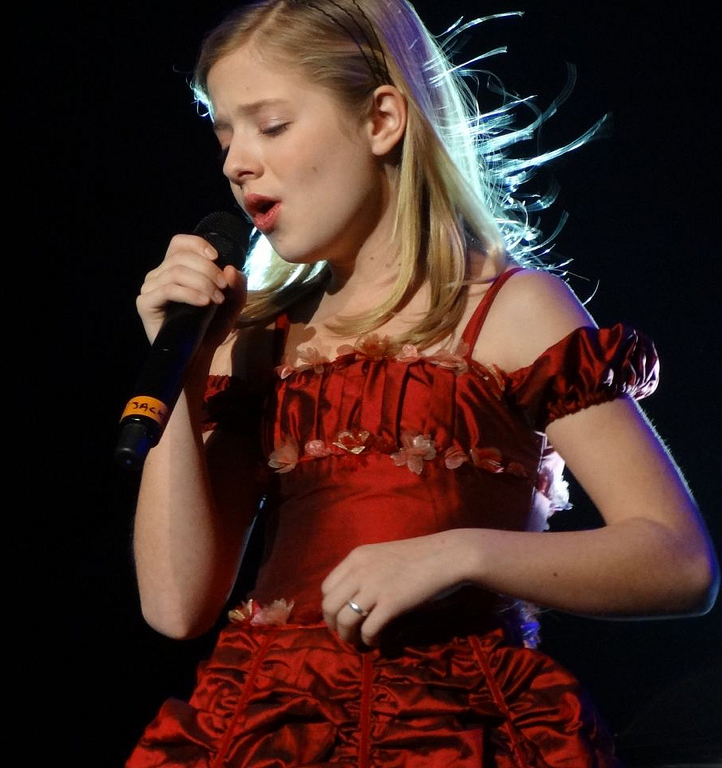
Evancho in December 2011

Evancho's 2011 Christmas album, Heavenly Christmas, was produced by Rob Mounsey. The selections include traditional Christmas carols like "The First Noël" and "O Little Town of Bethlehem", standards like "I'll Be Home for Christmas" and "White Christmas", and newer songs, such as "Walking in the Air" (from the 1982 animated short film The Snowman) and "Believe" (from the 2004 movie The Polar Express). The album was released on November 1, 2011, exclusively by Walmart in the US and elsewhere in the US in October 2012.

The album entered the Billboard Classical Albums chart at No. 1, the Holiday Albums chart at No. 3, and peaked on the Billboard 200 at No. 11. It peaked at No. 9 on the Canadian Albums chart. Allmusic's review gives the album three stars, commenting: "Evancho's vocals are impressive as always, and the arrangements are mostly tasteful, with only occasional moments of bombast". The Salt Lake City Tribune rated the album "A−". Christopher John Farley of The Wall Street Journal wrote that Evancho "sounds like she's channeling a past life, a future self, or possibly an actual angel."

Evancho's television appearances to promote the album included The View, The Talk, and The Tonight Show. She gave concerts to promote the album in December 2011 in Buffalo, New York; Atlantic City, New Jersey; and Pittsburgh. On its 2011 year-end charts, Billboard ranked Heavenly Christmas as the No. 4 best-selling Classical Album of the year. It ranked the album No. 41 on the 2012 year-end Canadian Albums chart.

=== Songs from the Silver Screen ===
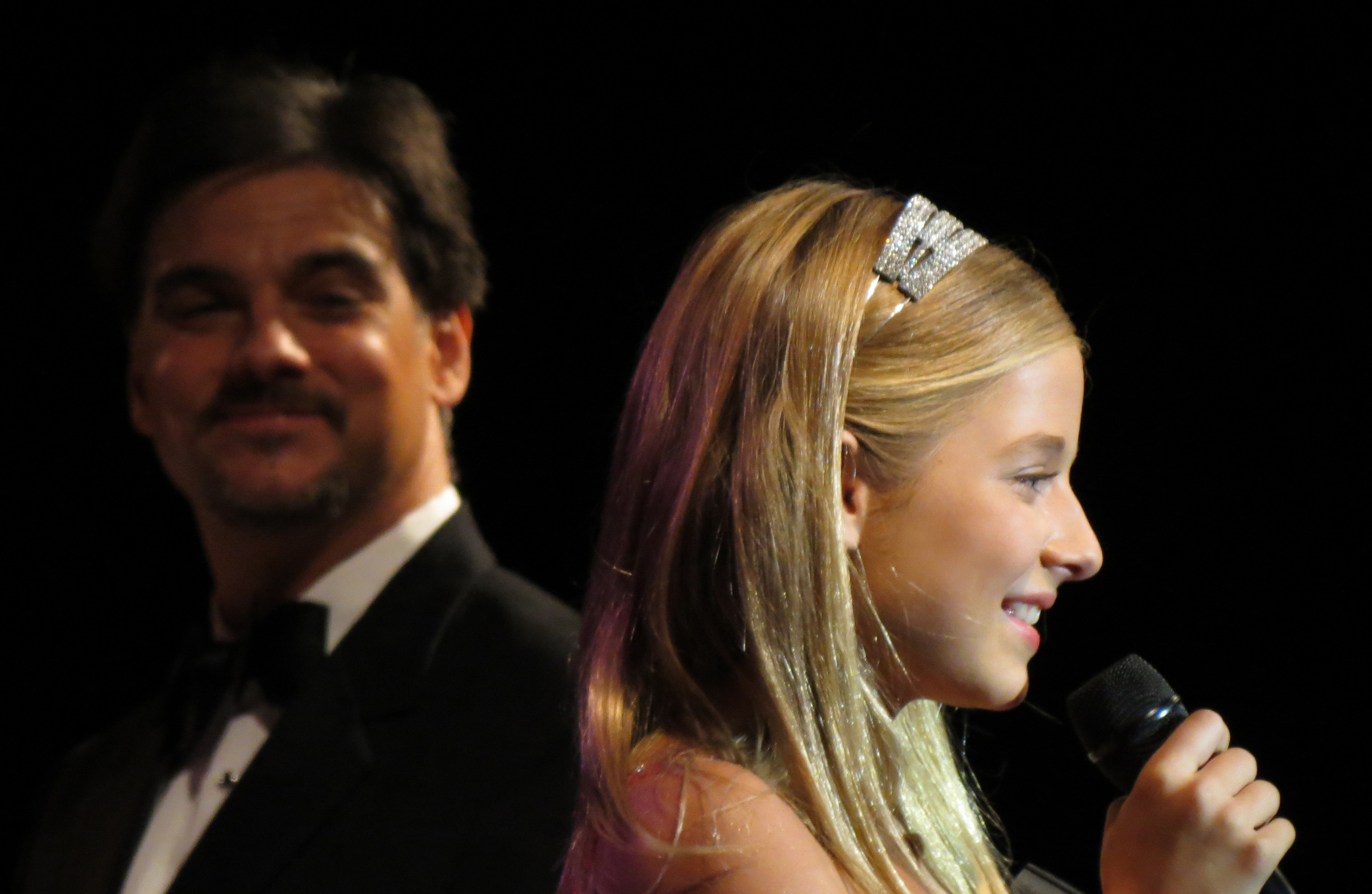
Evancho with conductor John Mario Di Costanzo in August 2012

Evancho's fourth full-length album, Songs from the Silver Screen, was released on October 2, 2012. The album is composed of songs used in popular films, arranged by Bill Ross, including the whimsical ("Pure Imagination" from Willy Wonka & the Chocolate Factory), Disney songs ("Can You Feel the Love Tonight" from The Lion King and "I See the Light" from Tangled), anthems ("My Heart Will Go On" from Titanic, featuring Joshua Bell, violin) and romantic standards ("Some Enchanted Evening" from South Pacific). Other collaborations on the album are "The Summer Knows" from Summer of 42, featuring Chris Botti, trumpet, and "Come What May" from Moulin Rouge!, featuring The Canadian Tenors. An Allmusic review awarded the album 3-1/2 stars out of five.

A 2012 PBS Great Performances special called Jackie Evancho: Music of the Movies features nearly the same selections as the album. Evancho began a 42-stop tour to promote the album in August 2012 in Japan with the Tokyo Philharmonic Orchestra. The first leg of the tour included concerts in two dozen North American cities through June 2013. Evancho also performed and was interviewed on television shows on NBC, ABC, CBS, Fox and CNN in late 2012. A second leg stretched from late 2013 to August 2014.

The album debuted at No. 7 on the Billboard 200, No. 1 on the Classical Albums chart and No. 22 on the Canadian Albums chart. The ranking made the 12-year-old the second artist who ever "amassed three top 10 albums [on the Billboard 200] at such a young age." The album remained on the Billboard 200 for 13 weeks and appeared on the Billboard Classical Albums chart in 72 weeks. Songs from the Silver Screen was the No. 4 Classical Album of 2013 and the No. 36 Classical Album of 2014.

=== Awakening ===
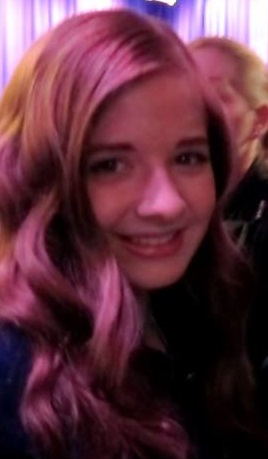
Evancho in 2014 promoting Awakening at the WSJ Cafe

Evancho released her fifth full-length album, Awakening, on September 23, 2014, on Sony Masterworks' Portrait Records label. Evancho promoted the album with a concert tour that began in November 2014 and continued into 2016, and a third PBS special. The album consists of classical pieces like Rachmaninoff's "Vocalise" and the art song "Dormi Jesu"; classical crossover covers of more contemporary pieces like U2's "With or Without You", Lara Fabian's "Je t'aime" and Within Temptation's "Memories"; and several original songs. Walmart's deluxe edition included six bonus holiday songs. Evancho released songs from the album including covers of "The Rains of Castamere" from Game of Thrones, "Think of Me" from The Phantom of the Opera, Ennio Morricone's "Your Love" and the Vavilov version of "Ave Maria".

Evancho promoted the album in a return to America's Got Talent as a guest artist at Radio City Music Hall during the show's ninth season. She also appeared on NBC's Today Show, The Queen Latifah Show, the Oprah Winfrey Network and the Dr. Phil show. Evancho's Awakening tour began in November 2014 with stops across the US and one concert in each of Costa Rica and Canada. Evancho's third PBS special, Awakening: Live in Concert (2014), filmed at Longwood Gardens in Pennsylvania with Cheyenne Jackson co-hosting, includes all of the songs from Awakening, as well as "My Immortal", "Say Something", as a duet with Jackson, and "O Mio Babbino Caro".

Awakening debuted at No. 17 on the Billboard 200 chart and No. 1 on the Billboard Classical Albums chart. This was Evancho's fifth consecutive release at No. 1 on the Billboard Classical Albums chart. Markos Papadatos of Digital Journal gave Evancho's album an A rating, calling it "stunning from start to finish thanks to her warm classical vocals." He called her renditions of the songs "ethereal", "crystalline" and "haunting". On its year-end charts, Billboard ranked Awakening as the No. 11 best-selling Classical Album of 2014 the No. 3 best-selling Classical Album of 2015 and the No. 31 best-selling classical album of 2016. The album remained on the Billboard Classical Albums chart for a consecutive 72 weeks.

=== Someday at Christmas and Two Hearts ===
Evancho released her sixth full-length album and third holiday collection, Someday at Christmas, on October 28, 2016, on the Sony Masterworks' Portrait label. The album consists of nine previously released tracks, including collaborations with Plácido Domingo, Peter Hollens and Vittorio Grigolo, and three new tracks: Stevie Wonder's anti-war song "Someday at Christmas" and two versions of "The Little Drummer Boy", one with Il Volo. The new tracks were produced by Dina Fanai and Heather Holley. with arrangements by Robert Kinkel, formerly of the Trans-Siberian Orchestra. The album peaked at No. 93, on the Billboard 200, No. 1 on the Billboard Classical Albums chart (Evancho's sixth consecutive release to do so) and No. 3 on the Billboard Holiday Albums chart. It was the No. 27 best-selling classical album of 2016. A review in Cedar Rapids, Iowa's The Gazette called the album "a shimmering showcase for [Evancho's] incredible vocal range and interests. ... [The] duets in this project display her talents for harmonies, as well as tender melodies."

Evancho promoted the album by appearing on the Fall 2016 cover of, and in an interview, for Inspiring Lives Magazine. She included songs from the album in her 2016 holiday concerts and performed on NBC's Today Show, Fox's Good Day Chicago, at the America's Got Talent Holiday Spectacular and the Harry show.

She released her seventh full-length album, Two Hearts, on March 31, 2017, on Sony's Portrait label. It consists of an album of classical crossover songs and an attached EP consisting of five pop tunes, four of which she co-wrote. The release was Evancho's first to include her own songwriting (other than contributions that she made in 2010 to the lyrics of the title song of Dream With Me). Fanai and Holley returned as producers and co-writers of the four songs on the EP with Evancho.

Evancho began to promote the album near the end of her 2016–2017 Live in Concert Tour. Television promotions included the Today Show, NBC's New York Live and ABC's The View. In April 2017, Evancho gave ten performances at Café Carlyle in New York City, where she was the youngest artist ever to ever perform at the venue. The same month, she released a music video of a song from the album, "Pedestal". In May 2017, Evancho began a tour to promote Two Hearts. The album debuted at No. 100 on the Billboard 200, and No. 1 on the Billboard Classical Albums chart, Evancho's seventh consecutive release to reach the top of that chart. The Two Hearts tour continued throughout 2018 and into early 2019. In February 2019, Evancho competed on America's Got Talent: The Champions but did not advance to the final. She also performed on the season's finale show.

=== The Debut and Carousel of Time ===
On April 12, 2019, Evancho released her eighth studio album, The Debut, focusing on songs from 21st century Broadway musicals and musical films. The album was produced by Michael Mangini. The album was her eighth consecutive release on the Billboard Classical Albums chart to reach No. 1.

Evancho began a U.S. tour in April 2019 to promote The Debut, beginning with two nights at 54 Below in New York. The tour was interrupted in early 2020 due to the COVID-19 pandemic and resumed in early 2022. She also promoted the album on various media, including Yahoo! Finance and Good Morning America. She performed three further concerts with Michael Feinstein at his eponymous club in New York in August 2019. She stated in 2019 that she was working with vocal coach Joan Lader.

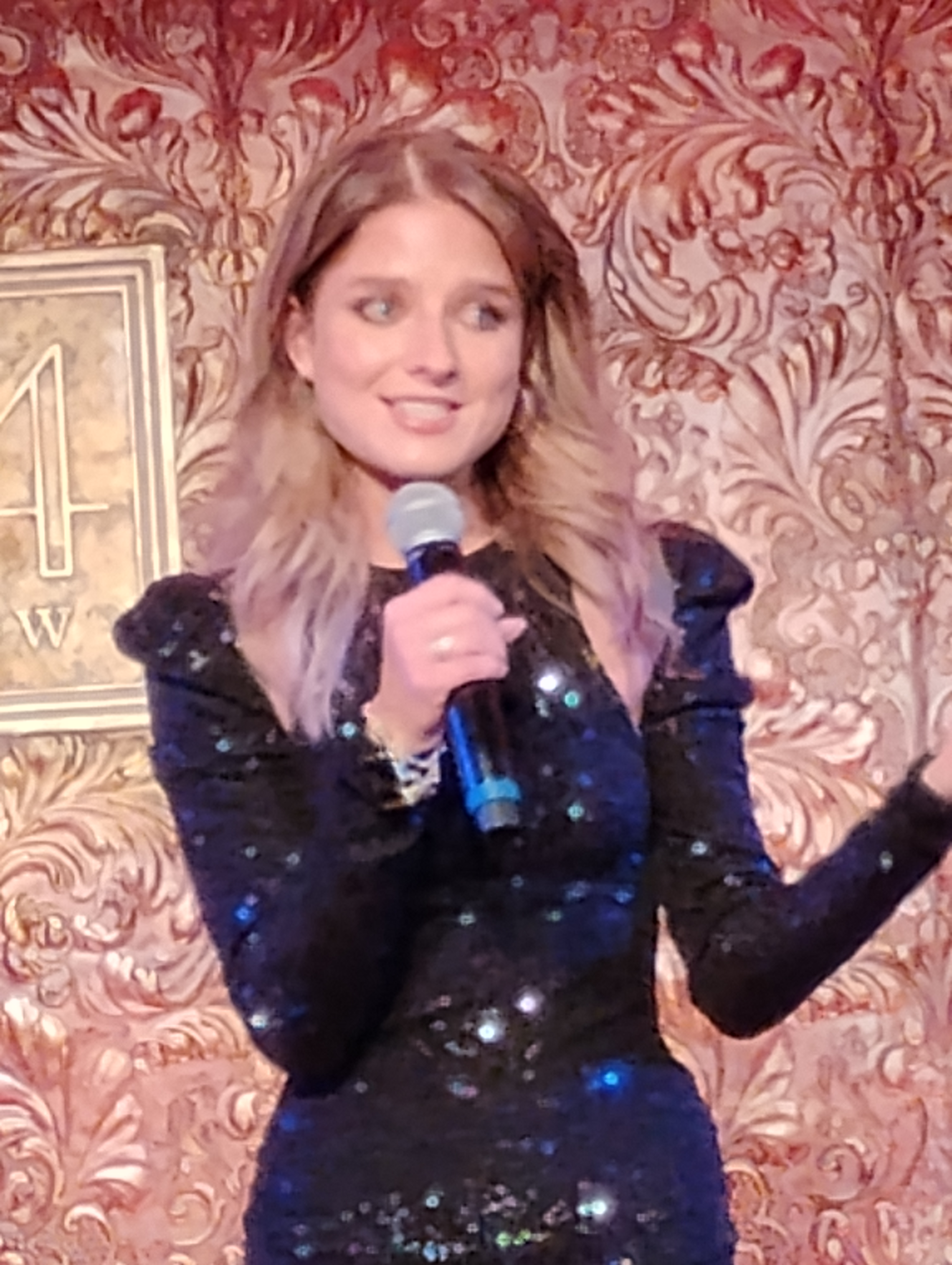
Evancho in 2024 at 54 Below

In 2020 Evancho began recording an album of covers of Joni Mitchell songs, produced by Fred Mollin, at Sound Stage Studio in Nashville. She released the disc, titled Carousel of Time, on September 9, 2022. Before its release, she introduced four singles from the album: "River" in October 2020, "Both Sides Now" in May 2022, "A Case of You" in July 2022, and "Blue" in August 2022, which she performed on Good Day New York in September and WGN-TV in October. Jill O'Rourke, reviewing the album for TalentRecap.com, wrote: "Evancho brings a signature ethereal quality to Mitchell's music, as well as a clear emotional connection with the lyrics."

Evancho gave a series of concerts featuring the songs on Carousel of Time, together with some of her other favorites, starting at 54 Below in New York City in September 2022 and continuing in October at City Winery venues in Nashville, Boston, Washington, D.C., Philadelphia, Chicago and Atlanta. Marilyn Lester wrote of her concert at 54 Below in Theater Pizzazz: "Her tone is as clear as a bell, as smooth as glass, and her range spectacular. ... [However,] while Evancho identifies [with Joni Mitchell's artistry, she] often wasn't able to be clear in her enunciation. ... Evancho in her enthusiasm is unfocused, and one wonders if, at times, she really understands the lyric she's singing. The purity and perfection of her voice deserves to be carefully managed, as does the person behind that miraculous artistry."

Evancho released an EP, Solla, on May 3, 2024. She wrote all 6 songs on the disc and co-produced it with Greg Camp; its first single, "Behind My Eyes", was released in September 2023 and, after Evancho performed the song on GMA in January and radio play in February, it climbed to No. 22 on the Billboard Adult Contemporary chart. She returned to 54 Below in June 2024 for two concerts called "Jackie Evancho: My Story" featuring songs on Solla and older favorites. She also appeared on television later in the year to sing songs from, and promote, the album. Evancho recorded "Love Is the Answer" for an upcoming album, The Last Duet, celebrating Dan Seals' career.

=== Other music performances, philanthropy and health struggles ===
==== 2009 to 2012 ====
Evancho performed the American national anthem at the 2009 memorial ceremony for the victims of United Flight 93 and the 2011 NHL Winter Classic. In 2011, she performed Nella Fantasia at the Beverly Hills Chefs for Seals event to support ending the annual Canadian seal hunt and became an ambassador for a Humane Society of the United States program that encourages children to help protect animals. In February 2011, she performed her first full-length concert as a headliner, in Houston, Texas, with the Houston Chamber Choir. She next sang at the 2011 Festival of the Arts Boca, along with young stars of the Metropolitan Opera. Evancho also sang at Muhammad Ali's 2011 "Celebrity Fight Night" charity event to battle Parkinson's disease, in Phoenix, Arizona. She performed the introduction to "Somewhere Over the Rainbow" on Oprah's farewell special broadcast in May 2011.

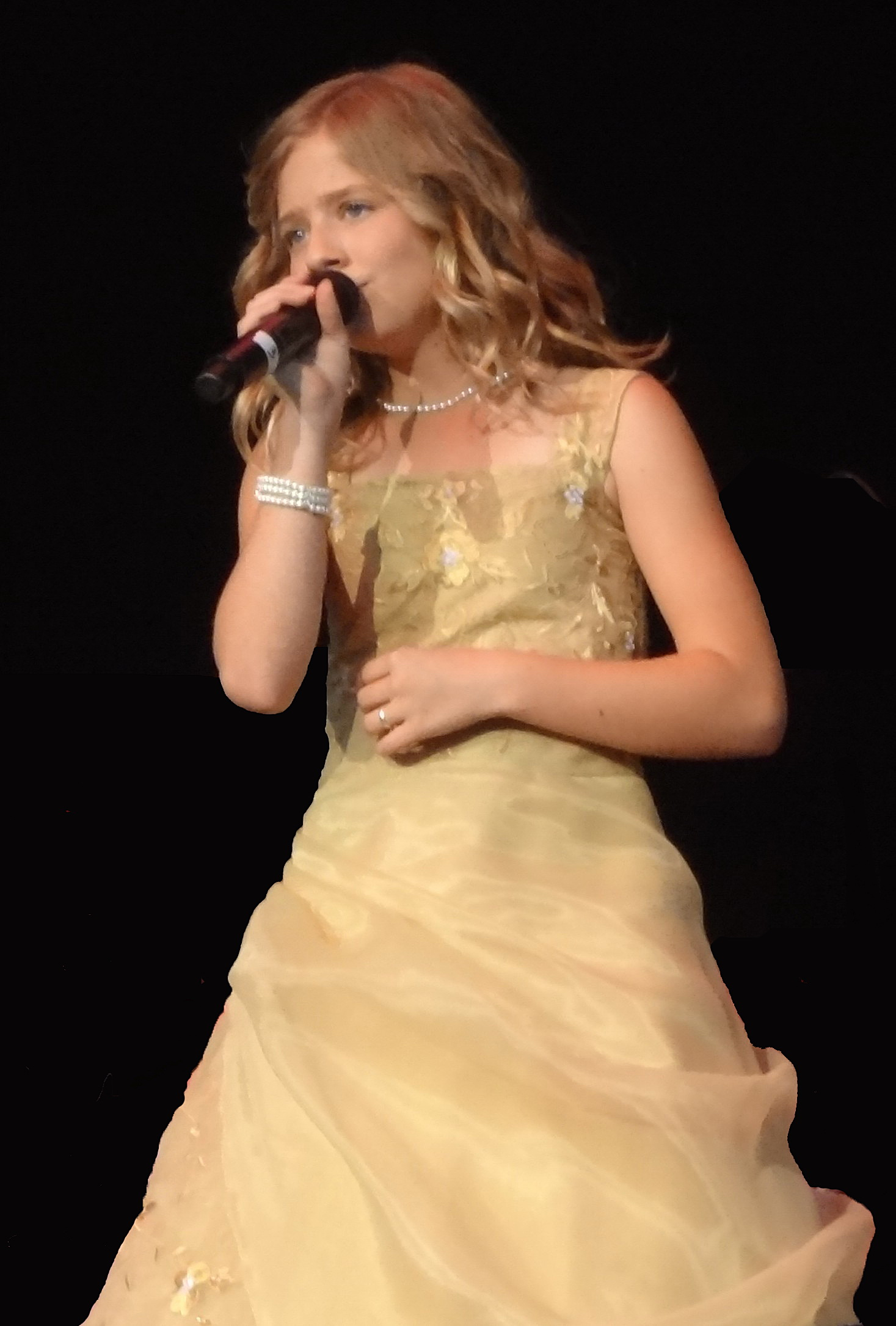
Evancho in concert in June 2012

By 2011, Evancho had recorded with Tony Bennett and on David Foster albums, also appearing with the latter in Japan. She returned to Japan in January 2012 to participate in the Bunkamura Orchard Concert Hall reopening program "Musical meets Symphony", and to give her own concert there with the Tokyo Philharmonic Orchestra. While there, she sang for the Imperial family. In February 2012, Evancho sang at the US National Prayer Breakfast. In April, Evancho appeared on Dancing with the Stars, singing "Ave Maria" and "Dark Waltz" to accompany two dance teams. She performed as a guest star on the 2012 season finale of Canada's Got Talent. In June, that year, she sang in Russia at the opening ceremonies of the St. Petersburg International Economic Forum, together with Dmitry Hvorostovsky and Sumi Jo.

Evancho sang in the 2012 So The World May Hear Gala to benefit the Starkey Hearing Foundation, which supplies hearing aids to people in need. That August, she sang in Hiroshima, Japan, in the "Peace for World" concert and performed together with Tony Bennett at the Ironstone Amphitheatre in Murphys, California. In October, she performed with the Dallas Symphony Orchestra at the opening of Klyde Warren Park in Dallas, Texas. Evancho partnered with WhyHunger and Sephora to offer a bath product, named for her song "To Believe", to benefit WhyHunger's efforts to end world hunger.

==== 2013 to 2015 ====
Evancho joined over 200 Cirque du Soleil performers at Bellagio in Las Vegas in the 2013 event "One Night for One Drop on World Water Day", to benefit the One Drop Foundation's worldwide clean water access and education programs. Robin Leach wrote: "12-year-old superstar singer Jackie [Evancho] stole the night with her "Bridge over Troubled Water" sung barefoot in the water of the giant stage. ... She also dominated the fantastic finale flying in as an angel [lowered] on a harness from the theater rooftop." In April 2013, she sang in concert in Taiwan with José Carreras. She performed another concert with Tony Bennett in May, in Alpharetta, Georgia, with the Atlanta Symphony Orchestra. In the 2013 broadcast of A Capitol Fourth, Evancho sang the national anthem and '"Can You Feel the Love Tonight".

Evancho headlined a benefit concert, called Jackie Evancho & Friends: We are Hope, at the LDS Conference Center in Salt Lake City in late 2013, for the Muzart World Foundation's programs to encourage the teaching of music and art in US public schools. She sang the US national anthem on Thanksgiving Day, at the Green Bay Packers vs. Detroit Lions football game, broadcast on Fox. She then headlined a Christmas-themed benefit concert at Carnegie Hall produced by her old mentor, Tim Janis, in December.

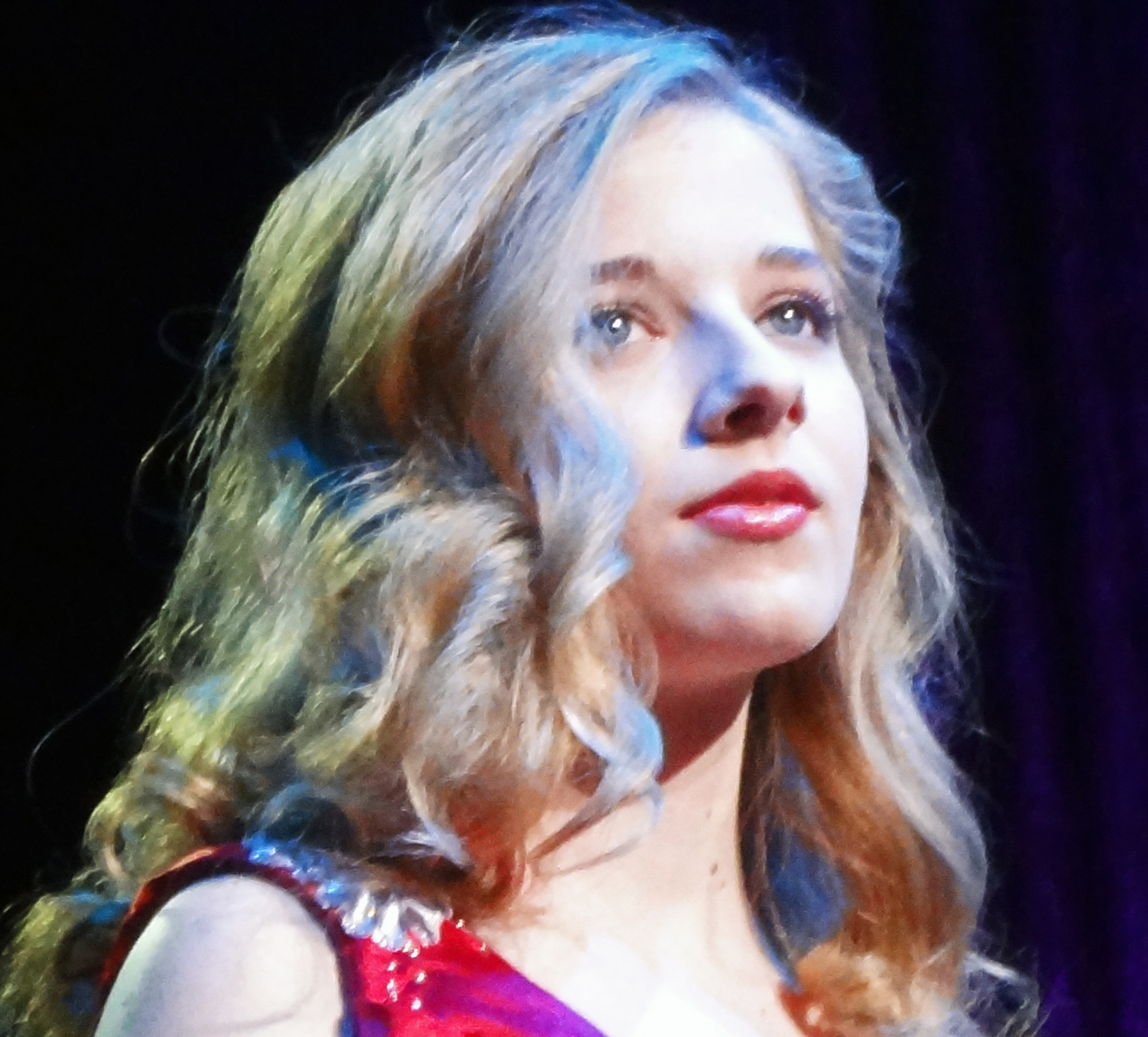
Evancho in concert, April 2014

In early 2014, Evancho was the performer for Susan G. Komen's Perfect Pink Party in Palm Beach, Florida, to benefit breast cancer research. She then headlined a concert with the San Bernardino Symphony Orchestra at Citizens Business Bank Arena in Ontario, California, to benefit the Loma Linda University Children's Hospital. She appeared in the 2014 gala to benefit Chicago's WTTW television and WFMT radio stations and in the 2014 National Memorial Day Concert, broadcast by PBS. Evancho performed at the Songwriters Hall of Fame 2014 awards dinner singing "Over the Rainbow". In September 2014, she performed at a David Foster Foundation concert to benefit families with children who need a major organ transplant. In November, she sang John Lennon's song "Imagine" at the United Nations to introduce the UNICEF #Imagine program.

In 2015, Evancho made a video to support the Humane Society's fight against seal hunting. She also joined Andrea Bocelli as a guest in his concert in Thailand. A review in The Nation commented: "If there's anything on Earth close to the sound of an angel, it must be the heavenly voice of Jackie Evancho". In August, she participated in a "David Foster and Friends" concert in Malaysia. In September, Evancho participated in another benefit, with Foster and Bocelli in Forte dei Marmi, Italy, for the Celebrity Fight Night Foundation. The same month, she performed at the World Meeting of Families in Philadelphia as part of the celebration of Pope Francis's visit to that city. In October 2015, Evancho performed at a benefit for the Global Lyme Alliance in New York City. In December, she sang the US national anthem at the Pittsburgh Steelers game against the Indianapolis Colts and released the first single on her own JE Touring label, a cover of Taylor Swift's "Safe & Sound", together with a video.

==== 2016 to present ====
In January 2016, Evancho appeared at the Mending Broken Hearts With Hope luncheon to benefit The Shelter for Abused Women & Children in Naples, Florida. In April, Evancho sang the national anthem at the Pittsburgh Pirates' 2016 opening home game. She also released an original pop song by Peter Zizzo, "Apocalypse". Billboard wrote that she "has found a brand-new sound. The 16-year-old singer ... is taking a step outside the classical world that made her famous"; but Evancho told Billboard: "I'm not going to get rid of my classical ... roots". A reviewer for The New Yorker found the track "cloying", writing that Evancho "sounds unremarkable outside her genre". She also released a video of the song and performed it on the Today show and Live! with Kelly and Michael.

Evancho entertained at the 2016 Project Sunshine benefit gala and returned to Washington, DC, to participate in the 2016 broadcast and live performance of A Capitol Fourth. In September, Evancho sang at the David Foster Foundation's 2016 fundraiser at the MTS Centre in Winnipeg, Manitoba, Canada, to help pay for pediatric organ transplants and support patients' families. She performed at the Memphis Music Hall of Fame induction ceremony in November and ended the year with a performance in AGT's first Christmas special.

Evancho sang the US national anthem at the first presidential inauguration of Donald Trump in January 2017. She stated that her decision to perform was apolitical, but her selection drew comment on social media and in the press, "from both sides of the political spectrum". On the same day, she released a recording titled Together We Stand, containing three songs: "The Star-Spangled Banner", "America the Beautiful" and "God Bless America". Evancho stated that profits from the release would go to LGBT "charities in support of my sister Juliet". The three songs charted at No. 2, 4 and 5, respectively, on Billboard's Classical Digital Song sales chart. Juliet, who is transgender, has advocated for a US federal law to allow transgender students to use bathrooms and other public school facilities designated for the gender with which they identify. Evancho led a TV special in August 2017, on the TLC television network, called "Growing Up Evancho", focusing on the Evanchos' family life and efforts to secure transgender rights. In 2019, asked if she learned any lessons from the Inauguration experience, Evancho said: "Yes ... if you have a bad gut feeling, and your team still pushes you to do something, don't give in, don't do it!"

In 2018, Evancho performed at the annual "Romance of the Mission" benefit gala to preserve and support the Mission San Juan Capistrano in California. In 2019, she presented a concert at the August Wilson Center in Pittsburgh to benefit The Brave Heart Foundation, which supports homeless LGBTQ young adults. In July she headlined a benefit, accompanied by Pacific Symphony, as part of the dedication festivities of Christ Cathedral in Garden Grove, California. In October she sang in a concert of songs from the new rock musical Get Jack, with music by Kip Winger, lyrics and book by Damien Gray and direction by Kelly Devine.

In 2020, Evancho competed on season three of The Masked Singer as "Kitty". She has stated that her career was interrupted by a mental breakdown related to the eating disorder and body dysmorphia that she has struggled with since 2015; she also stated that in January 2021 she was in a car accident in which she fractured her back, discovering that she suffers from osteoporosis, and, also during the COVID-19 pandemic, her parents divorced.

Evancho splits her time between New York City and Pittsburgh. Aside from concerts promoting her albums, she continues to give Christmas-themed concerts. For example, she performed a concert titled "Home for the Holidays" in December 2021 at Millersville University in Millersville, Pennsylvania, and the following December, she gave a similar concert at the Carnegie of Homestead Music Hall in Munhall, Pennsylvania. In April 2023, she gave a concert at The Centrum in Spring, Texas, and in August of that year, she returned to Ocean City, New Jersey to reunite with the Ocean City Pops orchestra, with whom she had performed previously. In late 2024, Evancho opened for Echosmith on their "Cool Kids" U.S. tour. Among her holiday concerts that year was an appearance with the San Francisco Symphony in December.

=== Other activities ===
Evancho performed as a young child in several musicals, including Little Red Riding Hood, in which she played the title role. She also appeared as an extra in the 2010 film She's Out of My League. She made a guest appearance in the 2011 episode "Back to Max", in the Disney Channel series Wizards of Waverly Place, where her character sang "America the Beautiful" to work off school detention.

In the feature film The Company You Keep, a 2012 political thriller, Evancho played Isabel, the eleven-year-old daughter of a widowed attorney turned fugitive, played by Robert Redford, who also directed the film. Jon Weisman of Variety wrote that Evancho "showed she's more than a singing prodigy with her earnest sweetness".

Evancho modeled for GUESS Kids in 2012 and for Justice Girls Clothing in 2014, and she occasionally has appeared in other product advertisements and public service announcements.

== Reception and reputation ==
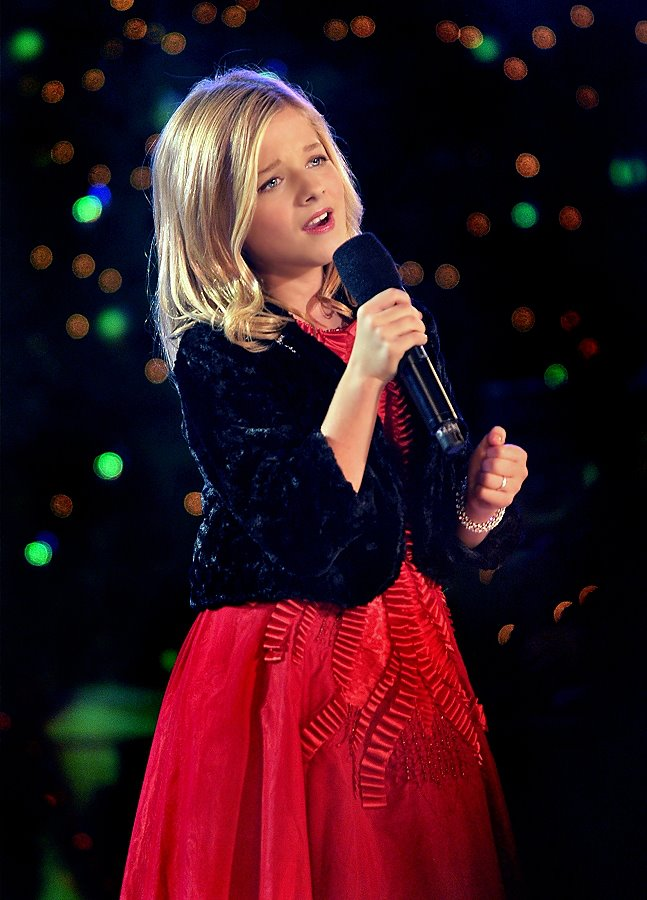
Evancho at the Grove Christmas Tree lighting, November 2011

=== Earliest assessments ===
Christopher Hahn, General Director of the Pittsburgh Opera, observed: "It's very unusual for a young child to have a voice that sounded so rich and developed." "I thought she was just lovely, sweetly compelling". Hahn particularly praised Evancho's phrasing. Composer Tim Janis commented that Evancho "takes a classical piece and makes it friendly and accessible. ... Her voice is so pure and natural, there's no flaw in it. People say 'I can hear her potential coming,' but no, it's here, it's now." Claudia Benack, Assistant Professor of musical theatre at Carnegie Mellon University, said that Evancho "has an unusually adult feel for the repertoire. ... She sings to the important part of the phrase, and then backs off. That's instinctual. ... She takes breaths sometimes where an adult would not, but that's just because she's young and little. ... She sings from the healthy part of her voice." Jia Tolentino of The New Yorker later called Evancho's YouTube audition for AGT "supernaturally blissful", and commented that she delivered "O mio babbino caro" with "graceful phrasing, a controlled, slow vibrato, and a tone that resonates impersonally, like a bell". Critic Tim Page, however, wrote that Evancho "has many years of work ahead of her before she becomes any sort of musician".

Andrew Druckenbrod, of the Pittsburgh Post-Gazette, reviewing Evancho's 2011 Pittsburgh Opera concert, stated that "what was most impressive ... was how musical she was ... her focus on phrasing and an understanding of the emotion in the ... musical numbers." The review also praised "her reverberant chest voice [and] her head voice, hitting the highest register with intonation and purity" and echoed Janis: "That she continues to be greeted with skepticism is unfair. ... Yes, the concert showed that Jackie is a young girl, yet one with artistry to be appreciated now without debating about what her future might hold." Antony Walker, Pittsburgh Opera's music director, said: "she has a very sincere way of singing. ... Her voice has a lovely quality to it. It's very simple singing but it comes from the heart. You rarely hear someone so young with such a beautiful voice". Nekesa Mumbi Moody, writing for Associated Press, commented that, although "there is a youthful quality in Jackie's voice, it's hardly childlike: It's a soprano that deftly traverses the musical scales". Mark Kanny, in the Pittsburgh Tribune-Review, called her voice "beautifully in tune and well supported. ... Evancho's sincerity of delivery was affecting".

Bob Boilen of NPR wrote, "I simply couldn't believe my eyes and ears." He called her voice "beyond-beautiful" when she performed "for a stunned audience at the NPR Music offices". A review of her 2011 Sun Valley concert stated that "Evancho transported [her audience] with pure, joyous, unaffected notes". Marcia Adair of the Los Angeles Times commented, in reviewing Dream With Me: [W]hat makes us feel like she will survive the journey from child star to adult performer is her magnificent sense of pitch, her natural ability to shape phrases and the ease with which she performs." Jon Caramanica, in The New York Times, reviewed her Avery Fisher Hall concert: "In the first half of the show Ms. Evancho often receded, but toward the end of the night she found purpose, delivering 'A Time for Us' with punch, and closing out Sarah McLachlan's 'Angel' with what felt like real yearning". The Wall Street Journal called Evancho's 2011 performance of the song "Angel" on the Tonight Show "moving".

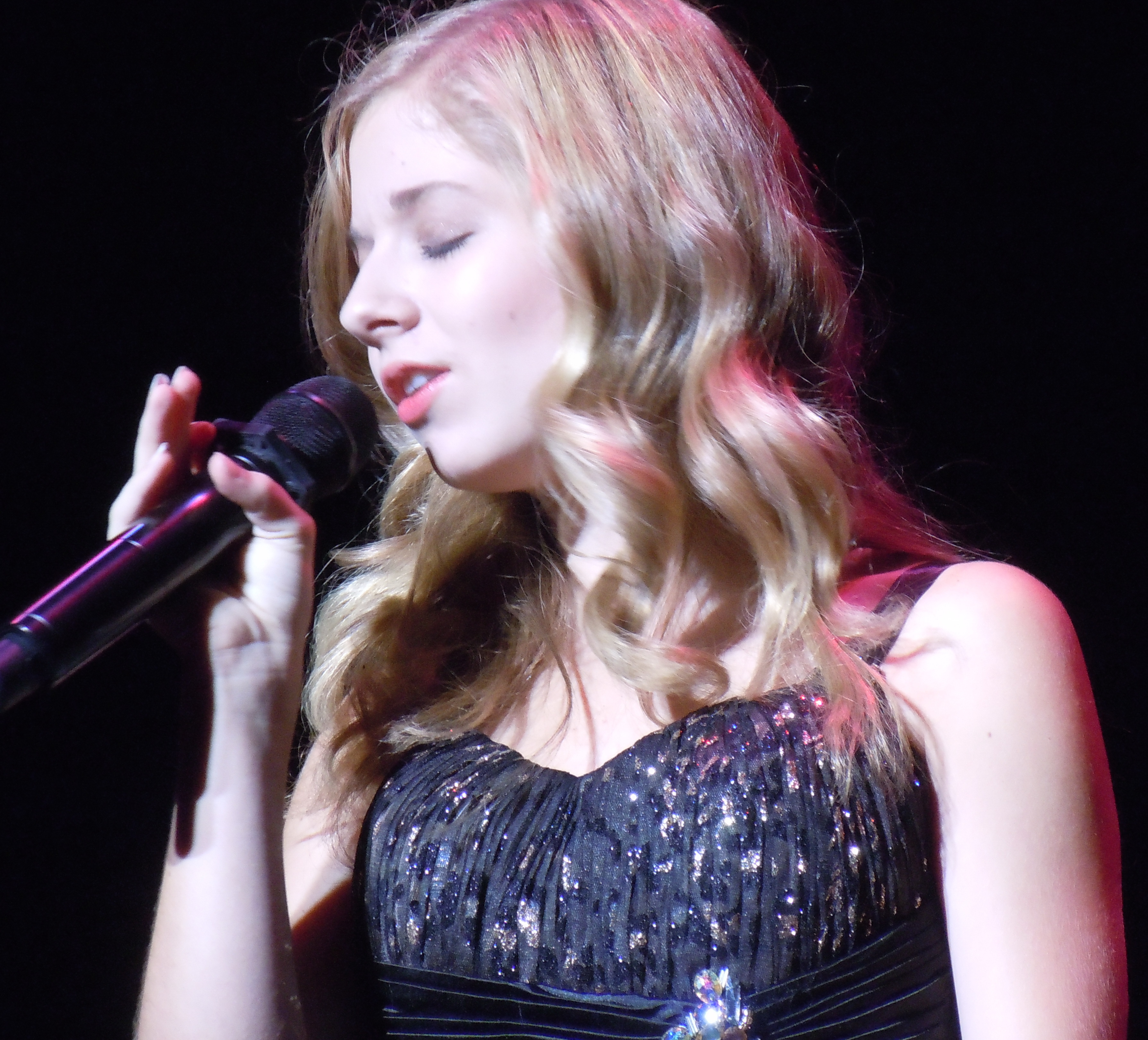
Evancho in 2013

A San Francisco Chronicle review of a 2012 concert judged her singing "an impressive thing to witness, and Evancho's technical precision and enormous range only serve to make it seem less fluky", but felt that "every selection sounded alike". A reviewer for The Denver Post wrote that Evancho "displayed her famous combo of poise and articulation". A Naples Daily News review stated: "Her poise. Her control. Her range. ... Her voice and her performance exhausted all of the superlatives in the dictionary." In 2013, an Atlanta reviewer commented: "Her pure and well-formed vowel sounds touched the hearts of everyone at the concert." A review in The Atlanta Journal-Constitution called Evancho "awesomely talented" and "technically flawless". The Buffalo News reviewer wrote: "there is a poignancy to the sound of this mature voice coming out of this child. Her high notes are a joy."

=== 2014 and later ===
In 2014, Chris Payne commented for Billboard magazine: "Evancho's stratospheric vocals are of course impressive for someone her age, though pipes like this are incredible for just about anyone." in 2015, the reviewer for Digital Journal wrote: "The control she displays over her voice is tremendous, and she tackles the high notes ... effortlessly, showcasing her angelic vocals and piercing pipes." Robin Leach wrote of Evancho's 2015 concert in Las Vegas: "She's still got the voice of an angel. It's remarkable, and her power is growing as she grows up. [She] had the audience on its feet with wild applause at the end of every song". Some reviewers, beginning in 2015, noticed a lack of connection with the text; a review in The Washington Post called her voice a "bell-like instrument, devoid of any messy human emotions [with] an ethereally floating tone. ... But imagine what Evancho can achieve once she stops obsessing over just sounding pretty, and actually listens to the words she's singing." Reviewing one of Evancho's 2016 concerts, Steve Barnes similarly wrote for the Times Union that her voice is "an instrument of pristine beauty. It peals with the purity of bells and lofts tones that shimmer with celestial iridescence" but that her performance lacks "an apparent interpretive style or emotional connection to the material".

A chapter in the 2016 book, Voicing Girlhood in Popular Music: Performance, Authority, Authenticity, by Dana Gorzelany-Mostak, Assistant Professor of Music at Georgia College, is devoted to analyzing Evancho's career and influence. Gorzelany-Mostak writes:

Despite her commercial success, a vocal cadre of critics, journalists, and bloggers have not always been kind to Jackie Evancho. Classical crossover's excessive sentimentality and reliance on [spectacle] often provoke the disdain of critics ... but perhaps the vitriol has just as much to do with the singer's age and gender. Young girls frequently become the scrutinized objects of the public's gaze. ... [T]he cluster of behaviors customarily defined as "girlish" are frequently devalued, mocked, and marginalized. ... With her embodiment of both sheltered innocence ... and hyperability ... [Evancho] expands the fan base for classical crossover, dethrones elitist conceptions of opera, challenges conventions of the classical canon, and forges a new path for the next cohort of girl performers who have the courage to follow in her footsteps.

Will Friedwald wrote of Evancho's 2017 concert series at Café Carlyle, that "this superhuman voice is housed in the person of someone relatively inexperienced in terms of relating to an audience and especially in a New York nightclub. (It will be years, if ever, before she can connect with a crowd like, for instance, Marilyn Maye.) ... She covers a lot of bases musically. ... Her rendition of "Music of the Night" is especially moving. ... Hearing Jackie Evancho in such an intimate space is a rare chance to experience perfection at close proximity." Linda Amiel Burns, praised Evancho's voice at the Carlyle, but thought that some of the song choices were odd, and that sometimes "it was difficult to understand the lyrics". She felt that Evancho sounded more comfortable in her classical selections, but that pop songs require "a different vocal technique with more emphasis on the lyrics ... she has to watch her phrasing ... breathe in the right places, and find the deeper meaning and longing that the song expresses." Of Evancho's charity performance with Matteo Bocelli in 2018, an NBC wrote that their "range-defying duet ... tore the house down, with both artists hitting notes that were borderline impossible. Evancho's vocals paired effortlessly with the famous Italian tenor's voice, resulting in a breezy, romantic performance that would make Nat King Cole ... proud." A reviewer for New Jersey Stage wrote that, at her December 13, 2019 concert, "Evancho sings with feeling. [Her] voice floats out over the audience ... with precision and grace, her runs and tone spot on".

A review of her 2020 cover of "River" in American Songwriter praised "her lilting soprano vocals and the purity and perfection she finds within her upper register". For NBC Insider in 2024, Jackie Manno praised a January 2024 performance by Evancho of her single "Behind My Eyes" on Good Morning America, writing that it featured "her prettiest vocals yet".

=== Honors ===
Evancho appeared on the National League of Junior Cotillions' list of "Ten Best-Mannered People of 2011" for "demonstrating humility and politeness as a young performer". She was honored in 2012 by the Senator John Heinz History Center at its 20th Annual History Makers Award Dinner as one of five "distinguished Pittsburghers ... recognized for their exceptional contributions to the history of Western Pennsylvania, the nation, and the world". Evancho was the youngest person ever to be so honored. The Kean Quest Talent Search, since 2011, has given an annual "Jackie Evancho Award" to a contestant who "exemplifies courage and motivation and pushes through to follow their dreams". In both 2011 and 2012, Billboard magazine named Evancho to its list of "21 Under 21: Music's Hottest Minors". In 2017, Evancho was named to the "2018" Forbes 30 Under 30 list of musicians.

== Discography ==
Year	Title	Notes
2009	Prelude to a Dream	Independent studio album
2010	O Holy Night	EP
2011	Dream with Me	Studio album
2011	Dream with Me in Concert	CD/DVD, Blu-ray and DVD-only version
2011	Heavenly Christmas	Studio album
2012	Songs from the Silver Screen	Studio album
2012	Jackie Evancho: Music of the Movies	DVD (part of the Songs from the Silver Screen deluxe set at Target)
2014	Awakening	Studio album
2014	Awakening: Live in Concert	DVD initially a PBS pledge gift; available elsewhere in 2015
2016	Someday at Christmas	Studio album
2017	Two Hearts	Studio album
2017	Together We Stand	EP
2019	The Debut	Independent studio album
2022	Carousel of Time	Independent studio album
2024	Solla	EP

Billboard ranked Evancho the No. 1 Classical Albums Artist of 2011, as she released three of the top four albums on the Billboard 2011 year-end Classical Albums chart. She was the No. 10 Billboard 200 Artist of 2011, and the No. 3 Internet Albums Artist. Billboard ranked Evancho the No. 2 Classical Albums Artist of 2012, as three of her albums ranked in the top seven albums on the Billboard 2012 year-end Classical Albums chart. She was the No. 37 Billboard 200 Artist of 2012.

Billboard ranked Evancho the No. 5 Classical Albums Artist of 2013, the No. 7 Classical Albums Artist of 2014 and the No. 4 Classical Albums artist of 2015, as Awakening was the No. 3 classical album of 2015. Evancho was ranked the No. 12 Classical Albums Artist of 2016, as her 2016 holiday album, Someday at Christmas, was the No. 27 best-selling classical album of 2016, and Awakening was the No. 31 best-selling classical album of 2016. Evancho's 2017 and 2019 albums, Two Hearts and The Debut, were her seventh and eighth consecutive releases to reach No. 1 on the Billboard Classical Albums chart.
