= Prelude to a Dream =

Studio album by Jackie Evancho
- Released: November 10, 2009
- Genre: Classical
- Length: 59:27
- Label: Self-released

Jackie Evancho chronology
Prelude to a Dream (2009)	O Holy Night (2010)

Prelude to a Dream is the debut studio album by American singer Jackie Evancho, released on November 10, 2009. Evancho was nine years old when the album was released. The album consists mainly of covers of classical crossover songs such as Andrea Bocelli's "Con te partirò" and "The Prayer", Josh Groban's "To Where You Are" and Martina McBride's "Concrete Angel", and also included some classical pieces and a rendition of "Amazing Grace", among other selections.

The album was released independently through CD Baby. Nine months later, after Evancho's first performance on America's Got Talent, the album charted in August 2010 on the Billboard 200 at #121 and at #2 on the Billboard Classical Albums chart. Evancho's parents withdrew the album later the same month, however, citing Evancho's vocal progress since its recording.

== Track listing ==
Prelude to a Dream track listing
No.	Title	Writer(s)	Length
1.	"Everytime"	Britney Spears, Annet Artani	3:42
2.	"Concrete Angel"	Rob Crosby, Stephanie Kay Bentley	4:03
3.	"Teaching Angels How to Fly" (original song by James Breedwell)	James Breedwell	5:18
4.	"Starry Starry Night (Vincent)"	Don McLean	4:43
5.	"Think of Me"	Andrew Lloyd Webber, Charles Hart, Richard Stilgoe	3:09
6.	"Memory"	Andrew Lloyd Webber, Trevor Nunn, T.S. Eliot, Zdenek Hruby	3:53
7.	"To Where You Are"	Linda Thompson, Richard Marx	3:52
8.	"River of Dreams"	Ronan Hardiman, Neil Chris, Charlie Dore	4:23
9.	"Dark Waltz"	Matteo Saggese, Umberto Morasca, Frank Musker	4:21
10.	"The Prayer"	Carole Bayer Sager, David Foster	4:30
11.	"Amazing Grace"	John Newton	4:43
12.	"Ave Maria" (Latin lyrics)	Chris Hazell, Franz Peter Schubert	4:52
13.	"O Mio Babbino Caro" (Italian lyrics)	Giacomo Puccini, Christopher Todd Landor	4:04
14.	"Con Te Partiro" (Italian lyrics)	Lucio Quarantotto, Francesco Sartori, Luis Gómez-Escolar	3:54
Total length:			59:27

Notes

- The album originally had 13 tracks. The track "Teaching Angels How to Fly" was added later.

== America's Got Talent impact on sales; withdrawal of album ==
Jason Dowd of The Expressionist magazine gave Prelude to a Dream a glowing review. Rating the album 5 out of a possible 5, Dowd wrote:

This nine-year-old girl sings like a bird, with perfect harmony, passion, and heart. ... Jackie’s vocals on this CD are second to none; she has pitch perfect control and powerful vocals when needed, while delivering a sweet innocence in her voice. ... Jackie demonstrates her talent most in the song, "O Mio Babino Caro". I am amazed at the power and range she is able to achieve on this song. ... Some other great songs to mention on this album are "Teaching Angels How to Fly" for its sweet, soothing and heart-warming story and vocals, and also "Amazing Grace". ... We would definitely recommend this CD to anyone, and if you don’t like classical crossover, Jackie will make you a fan.

For the first nine months after its independent release, however, the album "had sold a negligible amount".

On August 10, 2010, Evancho performed on a special YouTube quarter-final edition of the fifth season of America's Got Talent. She was selected to perform after submitting an audition clip on YouTube of "Panis Angelicus" that received the most viewer votes of any submission. In her first performance on the show, Evancho sang "O Mio Babbino Caro", receiving a standing ovation, and was awarded a trip to Universal Studios Florida for receiving the most fan votes of all the YouTube submissions to the show.

After this performance, the album debuted in August 2010 on the Billboard 200 chart at #121 and at #2 on the Billboard Classical Albums Chart. It sold 4,000 copies that week (nearly all were digital downloads) and remained on Billboard's Classical Albums chart for four weeks. Nine of the songs on the album charted on Billboard's Classical Digital Songs chart. Evancho's parents withdrew Prelude to a Dream from distribution in late August 2010. Evancho's father, Mike Evancho, gave the following reason for the withdrawal: "Because the CD was recorded about a year and a half ago and her current voice no longer sounds like what it did then ... we decided to withdraw Prelude to a Dream and will be concentrating on new material as part of her progress." The CD has become a collector's item, and autographed copies have sold for more than $3,000.

== Charts and sales ==
=== Chart positions ===
Chart (2009)	Peak position
US Billboard 200	121
US Billboard Top Classical Albums	2
US Billboard Top Heatseekers	1
US Billboard Top Independent Albums	17
US Billboard Top Digital Albums	20

=== Sales ===
Country	Sales
United States	4,000
