= San Pellegrino alla Sapienza =

Church in Italy

Coordinates: 43.320686°N 11.329709°E

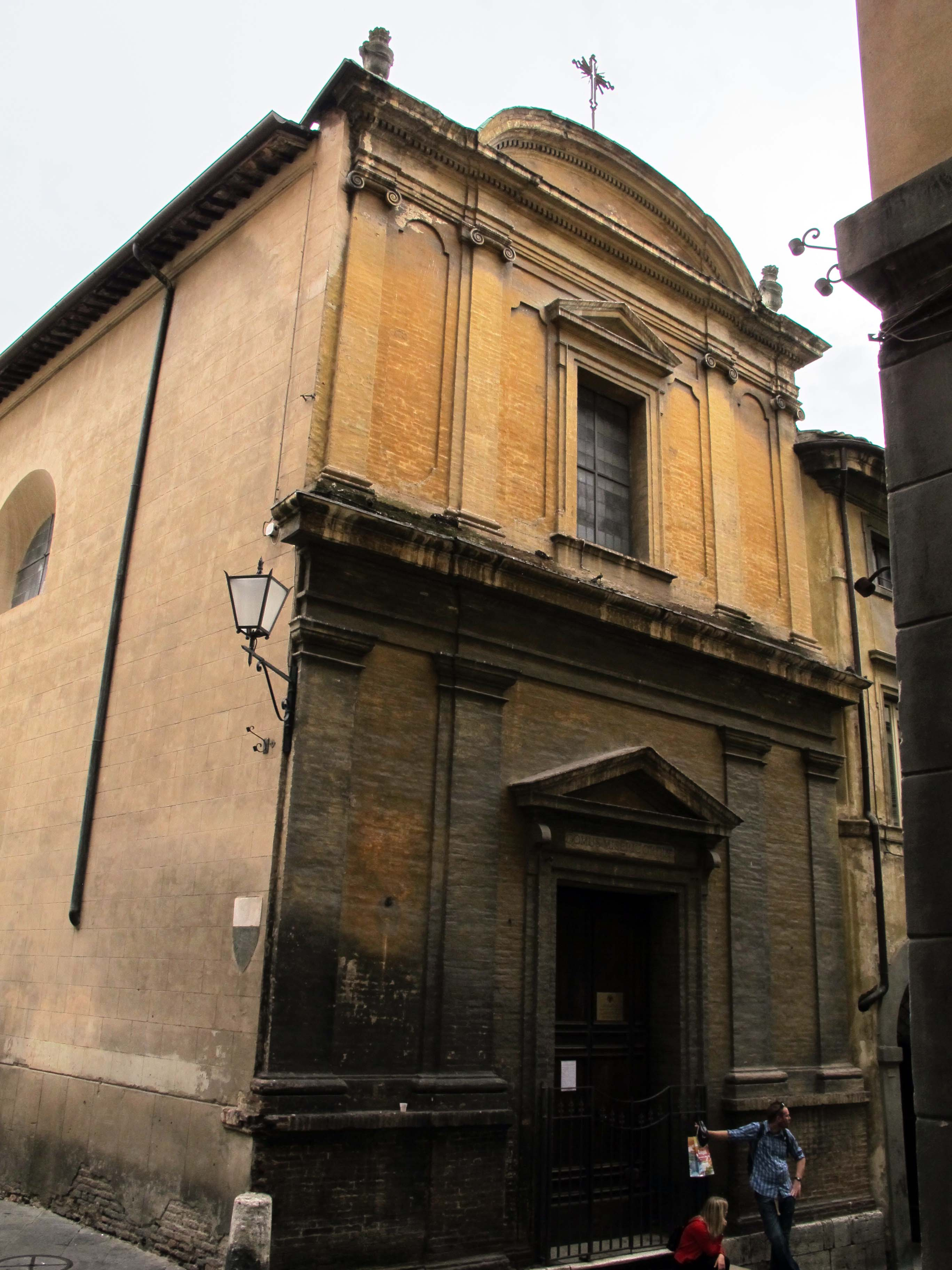

Religion
- Affiliation: Roman Catholic

Location
- Interactive map of San Pellegrino alla Sapienza
- Administration: Archdiocese of Siena-Colle di Val d'Elsa-Montalcino

Architecture
- Style: Gothic
- Groundbreaking: 13th century
- Completed: 20th century

San Pellegrino alla Sapienza o della Sapienza is a Gothic style, Roman Catholic church located at the intersection of via della Sapienza and via delle Terme in Siena, region of Tuscany, Italy. It is located across from the Teatro dei Rozzi.

== History ==
A parish church of San Pellegrino is documented at the site since 1050. A hospital, named Santa Maria della Misericordia, was founded on the site in 1240, and enlarged in 1320s by the Blessed Andrea Gallerani. The hospital was suppressed in 1408. Part of the hospital was assigned to the University of Siena, who erected the Accademia Fisiocritica (1691) with Pirro Maria Gabbrielli. In 1758, the library founded by Sallustio Bandini was opened there.

Various reconstructions of the church have occurred over the centuries. A major reconstruction occurred in 1767 under Marchetti. Major works in the interior were added in the 17th century. The wall niches have six statues of Sienese saints, the ceiling is frescoed with stories of the Life of Mary, and the main altar has a painting by Giuseppe Nicola Nasini depicting the Birth of the Virgin.

Also of note in the church are earlier depictions of Blessed Andrea Gallerani attributed to the school of Simone Martini, a St Peter and Paul by Bartolomeo Bulgarini, and a 14th-century ivory triptych and icon of the Madonna di Monteguaitano, originally from the church of Maria Santissima del Rosario. Other frescoes in the church were painted by Giuliano Traballesi; canvases were present in 1840 by Lorenzo Feliciati and Jacopo Calvi, with statues by Giuseppe Mazzuoli. Underneath the church was the Oratory of the Beato Andrea Gallerrani, containing paintings by Salimbeni and Casolani.
