= Künstler =

Künstler is a German word meaning "artist". Notable people with the surname include:

- Emily Kunstler (born 1978), American activist and documentary filmmaker
- Franz Künstler (1900–2008), last known surviving veteran of the First World War who fought for the Austro-Hungarian Empire
- James Howard Kunstler (born 1948), American author
- Karl Künstler (1901–1945), German Nazi SS concentration camp commandant
- Mort Künstler (1927–2025), American artist
- William Kunstler (1919–1995), American lawyer and activist
