= Lorenzo Feliciati =

Italian painter

Lorenzo Feliciati (1732–1799) was an Italian painter, born and was active in Siena.

== Professional career ==
Several pictures by this artist are to be found in the churches of Siena and its neighborhood. He painted for the church of San Pellegrino, Siena.
