= Celebrate the Season Parade =

Annual parade in Pittsburgh, Pennsylvania, U.S.

Prior logo of the Celebrate the Season Parade.

The Celebrate the Season Parade is one of the traditional parades held each year in Downtown Pittsburgh, Pennsylvania. It is held on the Saturday after Thanksgiving Day; that is, the last Saturday in November. It is one of the first events that rings in the holiday season and airs annually on WPXI, the local NBC-affiliated television station in Pittsburgh.

== Parade history ==
The first parade was held in 1980 and aired on local Metromedia affiliate WPGH-TV for the first two seasons and was sponsored by local department store chain Kaufmann's. Kaufmann's merged with Macy's in 2006; from that parade through the 2013 event, Macy's assumed title sponsorship, thus making the parade a smaller sister to the much larger Macy's Thanksgiving Day Parade held two days earlier in New York City. WIIC, the local NBC station now known as WPXI, decided to air live coverage of the parade. Its original hosts were Mike Hambrick and Edye Tarbox. David Johnson and Peggy Finnegan took over the hosting duties in 1991. Bob Bruce subbed for David Johnson for the 2002 and 2004 parades. John Fedko, the station's sports director, debuted as a street reporter in 1997, and was joined by a rotating personality from the station every year. Darieth Chisolm joined Fedko for the 2004, 2006 and 2007 parades. Julie Bologna handled street interviews for the 2008 parade along with Fedko. Formally known as the Celebrate the Seasons Parade, from 2010 to 2013, the parade was also known as the My Macy's Holiday Parade'. In February 2014, Macy's Parade Group announced it would end its sponsorship of the parade, citing the need to focus on other projects. WPXI announced that they were saddened by Macy's decision and would work hard on finding a new sponsor before the 2014 parade. By the 2014 parade, Pittsburgh Public Schools joined as the presenting sponsor, with the parade's name changing again, to the WPXI Holiday Parade.

2020 saw no parade on grounds of COVID-19 pandemic.

On September 8, 2021, WPXI announced they are ending their 30-year relationship with the parade.
