= Amii Stewart discography =

- Studio albums: 16
- Live albums: 1
- Compilation albums: 8
- Singles: 40
- Remix albums: 1

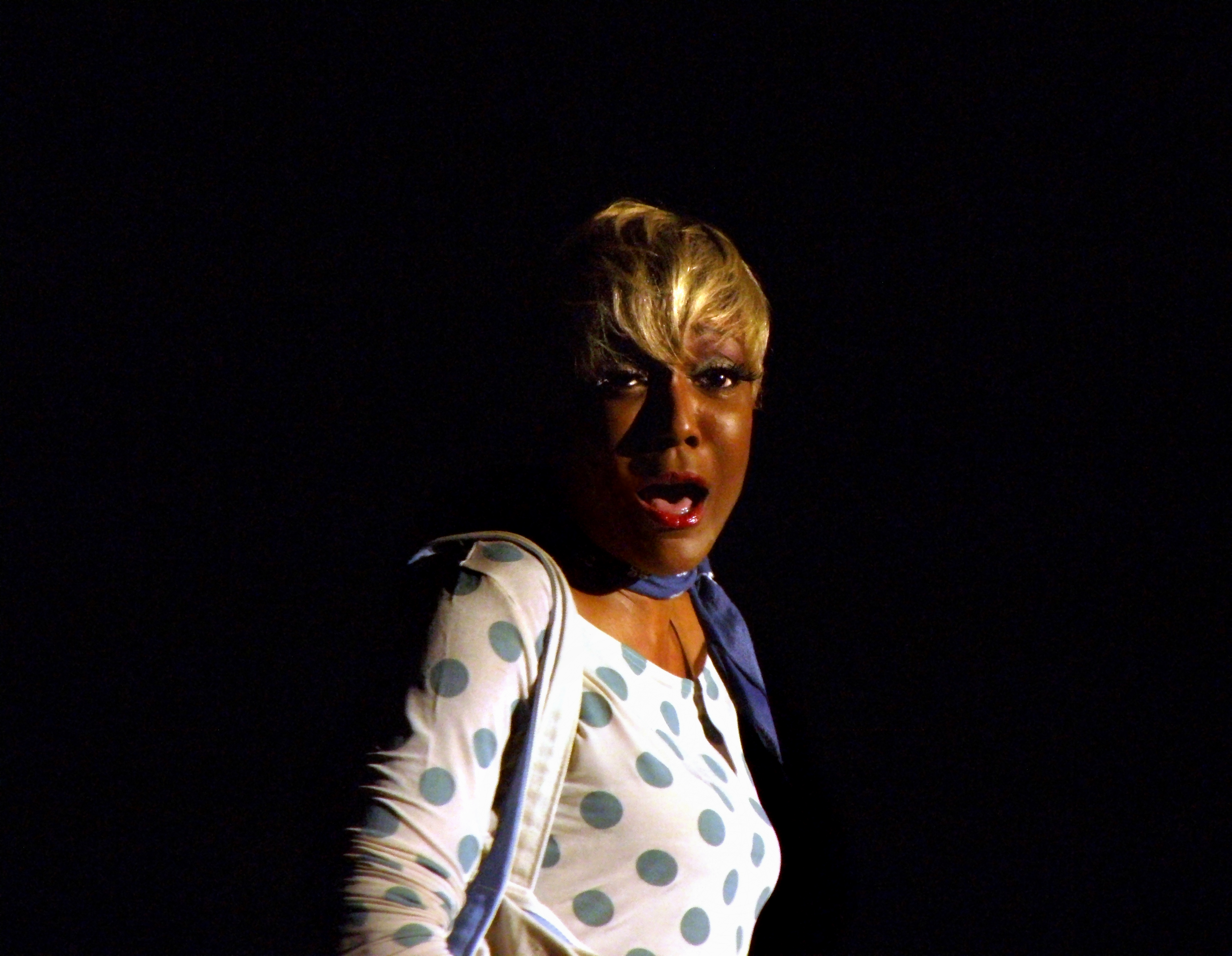
Stewart singing in the show "La via del Successo - Dreamsister's" at Teatro Manzoni in Milano, Italy (2016).

This is the discography of American disco and soul singer Amii Stewart.

== Albums ==
=== Studio albums ===
Title	Album details	Peak chart positions								
Title	Album details	US	US R&B	AUS	CAN	FIN	FRA	IT	NOR	SWE
Knock on Wood	Released: February 1979; Label: Hansa, Atlantic, Ariola; Formats: LP, MC, 8-track	19	9	38	2	10	1	10	—	3
Paradise Bird	Released: September 1979; Label: Hansa, Atlantic, Ariola; Formats: LP, MC, 8-track	—	—	84	69	8	—	—	39	11
Images	Released: April 1981; Label: Hansa; Formats: LP, MC; Released in North America as a slightly altered version as I'm Gonna Get Your Love in October 1981	—	—	—	—	—	—	—	—	49
Amii Stewart	Released: 1983; Label: RCA; Formats: LP, MC	—	—	—	—	—	—	—	—	—
Try Love	Released: 1984; Label: RCA; Formats: LP, MC	—	—	—	—	—	—	—	—	—
Amii	Released: 1986; Label: RCA, Ultraphone; Formats: CD, LP, MC	—	—	—	—	—	—	—	—	—
Time for Fantasy	Released: 1988; Label: RCA; Formats: CD, LP, MC	—	—	—	—	—	—	—	—	—
Pearls – Amii Stewart Sings Ennio Morricone	Released: 1990; Label: RCA; Formats: CD, LP, MC	—	—	—	—	—	—	—	—	—
Magic	Released: 1992; Label: RTI Music; Formats: CD, LP, MC; Italy and Germany-only release	—	—	—	—	—	—	—	—	—
Lady to Ladies	Released: 1994; Label: RTI Music; Formats: CD, MC; Italy and Spain-only release	—	—	—	—	—	—	13	—	—
The Men I Love	Release date: 1995; Label: RTI Music; Formats: CD, MC; Italy-only release	—	—	—	—	—	—	—	—	—
Love Affair	Release date: 1996; Label: RTI Music; Formats: CD, MC; Italy-only release	—	—	—	—	—	—	—	—	—
Unstoppable	Release date: October 25, 1999; Label: Universal; Formats: CD; Mainly contains re-recordings and previously unreleased songs	—	—	—	—	—	—	—	—	—
Lady Day	Release date: 2004; Label: Perle Nere; Formats: CD; Italy and Germany-only release	—	—	—	—	—	—	—	—	—
Caracciolo Street	Release date: November 15, 2010; Label: Perle Nere; Formats: digital download; Italy-only release	—	—	—	—	—	—	—	—	—
Intense	Release date: May 15, 2012; Label: Perle Nere; Formats: CD, digital download; Italy-only release	—	—	—	—	—	—	—	—	—
"—" denotes releases that did not chart or were not released in that territory.

=== Live albums ===
Title	Album details
In Concert for IBM in Malta	Released: 2000; Label: Visco Disc; Formats: CD; Italy-only release

=== Remix albums ===
Title	Album details
The Hits	Released: December 1985; Label: PRT, Hansa; Formats: CD, MC

=== Compilation albums ===
Title	Album details
The Best of Amii Stewart	Released: 1985; Label: RCA; Formats: LP, MC; Italy-only release
Sometimes a Stranger	Released: 1993; Label: Legend; Formats: CD; Europe-only release
All of Me	Released: 1995; Label: RCA; Formats: CD, 2xMC; Italy-only release
Knock on Wood – The Best of Amii Stewart	Released: July 16, 1996; Label: Hot Classics; Formats: CD
The Hits & the Remixes	Released: July 7, 1997; Label: Recall 2cd; Formats: CD; UK-only release
The Best Of	Released: August 10, 1998; Label: Ricordi; Formats: CD; Italy-only release
The Greatest Hits	Released: July 19, 2005; Label: Empire Musicwerks/Universal; Formats: CD
Knock on Wood – The Anthology	Released: November 18, 2016; Label: Sanctuary; Formats: digital download; UK-only release

== Singles ==
Title	Year	Peak chart positions										Certifications	Album
Title	Year	US	US R&B	AUS	BEL (FL)	CAN	GER	IRE	IT	SWE	UK	Certifications	Album
"You Really Touched My Heart"	1978	—	—	—	—	—	—	—	—	—	—		Knock on Wood
"Knock on Wood"	1978	1	6	2	20	1	13	15	2	5	6	BPI: Silver	Knock on Wood
"Light My Fire/137 Disco Heaven" (medley)	1979	69	36	14	30	58	26	—	—	12	5		Knock on Wood
"Jealousy"	1979	—	—	—	18	68	31	—	26	8	58		Paradise Bird
"The Letter" / "Paradise Bird"	1980	—	—	—	—	—	54	—	— 21	—	39		Paradise Bird
"My Guy/My Girl" (medley; duet with Johnny Bristol)	1980	63	76	—	—	77	—	—	—	—	39		Images
"Where Did Our Love Go"	1981	—	—	—	—	—	—	—	—	—	—		Images
"Rocky Woman"	1981	—	—	—	—	—	—	—	—	—	—		Non-album single
"Why'd You Have to Be So Sexy" (US-only release)	1981	—	—	—	—	—	—	—	—	—	—		Images
"I'm Gonna Get Your Love" (US, Canada and Italy-only release)	1981	—	—	—	—	—	—	—	—	—	—		I'm Gonna Get Your Love
"Digital Love" (US-only release)	1982	—	—	—	—	—	—	—	—	—	—		Images
"Great Balls of Fire" (Germany and Italy-only release)	1982	—	—	—	—	—	—	—	—	—	—		Images
"Lay Back in the Groove" (Netherlands-only release)	1982	—	—	—	—	—	—	—	—	—	—		Non-album single
"Working Late Tonight" (Europe-only release)	1983	—	—	—	—	—	—	—	23	—	—		Amii Stewart
"Bearobics" (with Paddington Bear and Charles Augins; UK-only release)	1983	—	—	—	—	—	—	—	—	—	—		Paddington Bear's Magical Musical
"Grazie perché" (with Gianni Morandi; Europe-only release)	1983	—	—	—	—	—	—	—	3	—	—		Non-album single
"Friends"	1984	—	46	—	—	—	—	11	1	—	12		Try Love
"I Gotta Have You Back" / "That Loving Feeling" (Italy-only release)	1984	—	—	—	—	—	—	—	—	—	—		Try Love
"Try Love" (Italy-only release)	1985	—	—	—	—	—	—	—	45	—	—		Try Love
"That Loving Feeling" (UK-only release)	1985	—	—	—	—	—	—	—	—	—	95		Try Love
"Together" (duet with Mike Francis)	1985	—	—	—	—	—	—	—	17	—	—		The Best of Amii Stewart
"Knock on Wood" / "Light My Fire/137 Disco Heaven" (remix)	1985	—	—	—	32	—	—	6	—	—	7		The Hits
"You Really Touched My Heart" (remix)	1985	—	—	—	—	—	—	—	—	—	89		The Hits
"My Guy, My Girl" (medley; duet with Deon Estus)	1985	—	—	—	—	—	—	—	—	—	63		The Hits
"Time Is Tight" (Germany and Italy-only release)	1986	—	—	—	—	—	—	—	25	—	—		Amii
"Love Ain't No Toy"	1986	—	—	—	—	—	—	—	—	—	99		Amii
"Break These Chains"	1986	—	—	—	—	—	—	—	—	—	—		Amii
"It's Fantasy" (Italy-only release)	1987	—	—	—	—	—	—	—	13	—	—		Time for Fantasy
"I Still Believe" (Italy-only release)	1988	—	—	—	—	—	—	—	—	—	—		Time for Fantasy
"Friends '91" (UK and Italy-only release)	1991	—	—	—	—	—	—	—	—	—	—		Non-album single
"Extralarge" (Germany and Italy-only release)	1991	—	—	—	—	—	—	—	—	—	—		Music from Detective Extralarge (by Enrico Riccardi)
"Don't Be So Shy" (Germany and Italy-only release)	1992	—	—	—	—	—	—	—	—	—	—		Magic
"Don't Stop (Pushin')" (Europe-only release)	1993	—	—	—	—	—	—	—	—	—	—		Magic
"Desire" (Germany-only release)	1993	—	—	—	—	—	—	—	—	—	—		Pearls – Amii Stewart Sings Ennio Morricone
"Knock on Wood '98" (re-recording; Italy-only release)	1998	—	—	—	—	—	—	—	—	—	—		Non-album single
"Knock on Wood '99" (re-recording; Europe-only release)	1999	—	—	—	—	—	—	—	—	—	—		Unstoppable
"Precious Moments"	2009	—	—	—	—	—	—	—	—	—	—		Non-album singles
"Con te"	2010	—	—	—	—	—	—	—	—	—	—		Non-album singles
"Walking Africa" (with the Walking Band)	2011	—	—	—	—	—	—	—	—	—	—		Non-album singles
"Ordinary People"	2012	—	—	—	—	—	—	—	—	—	—		Intense
"Sunshine Girl" (featuring Gabry Ponte)	2013	—	—	—	—	—	—	—	—	—	—		Non-album single
"—" denotes releases that did not chart or were not released in that territory.
