= Knock on Wood – The Best of Amii Stewart =

Knock on Wood - The Best of Amii Stewart

Compilation album by Amii Stewart
- Released: 1996
- Recorded: 1978–1985
- Genre: R&B, pop, disco
- Label: Hot Classics US
- Producer: Barry Leng, Narada Michael Walden, Mike Frances

Amii Stewart chronology
Love Affair (1995)	Knock on Wood - The Best of Amii Stewart (1996)	Unstoppable (1999)

Professional ratings
Review scores
Source	Rating
Allmusic	3.5/5 stars

Knock on Wood – The Best of Amii Stewart is a compilation album of recordings by Amii Stewart released in 1996. The compilation mainly covers material from her early disco career and albums Knock On Wood and Paradise Bird, both from 1979. This compilation was one of the first to use the original versions of Amii Stewart's hits instead of the 1985 remixes from album The Hits, with one exception - the duet "My Guy"/"My Girl" which originally was recorded with Johnny Bristol. Knock on Wood - The Best of Amii Stewart also contains two tracks from 1981's Images/I'm Gonna Get Your Love and finishes with 1985's European hit single "Friends".

== Track listing ==
1. "Knock on Wood" (original album version) - 6:13
2. "You Really Touched My Heart" - 4:29
3. "Light My Fire" / "137 Disco Heaven" (original album version) - 8:26
4. "Bring It on Back to Me" - 3:56
5. "My Guy, My Girl" (1985 version feat. Deon Estus) - 4:31
6. "Get Your Love Back" - 3:56
7. "The Letter" (original album version) - 6:58
8. "Paradise Bird" (original album version) - 6:35
9. "Jealousy" (original album version) - 6:09
10. "Right Place, Wrong Time" - 5:07
11. "Step Into the Love Line" - 5:23
12. "Why'd You Have to Be So Sexy" (extended version) - 5:20
13. "Where Did Our Love Go" (album version) - 4:26
14. "Friends" (long version) - 6:29

== Personnel ==
- Amii Stewart - vocals
- Barry Leng - backing vocals, guitar
- Charles Angins - backing vocals
- Gerry Morris - backing vocals
- Jimmy Chambers - backing vocals
- Tony Jackson - backing vocals
- Gerry Morris - bass guitar
- Adrian Shepard - drums
- Alan Murphy - guitar
- Ian Hughes - keyboards
- Ken Freeman - keyboards
- Pete Amesen - keyboards
- Simon May - keyboards
- Glyn Thomas - percussion
- Mike Francis - keyboards, backing vocals (track 14)

=== Production ===
- Producer - Barry Leng (tracks 1 to 11)
- Producer - Narada Michael Walden (tracks 12 & 13)
- Producer - Paul Micioni (track 14)
