= List of cover versions and samples of Ennio Morricone compositions =

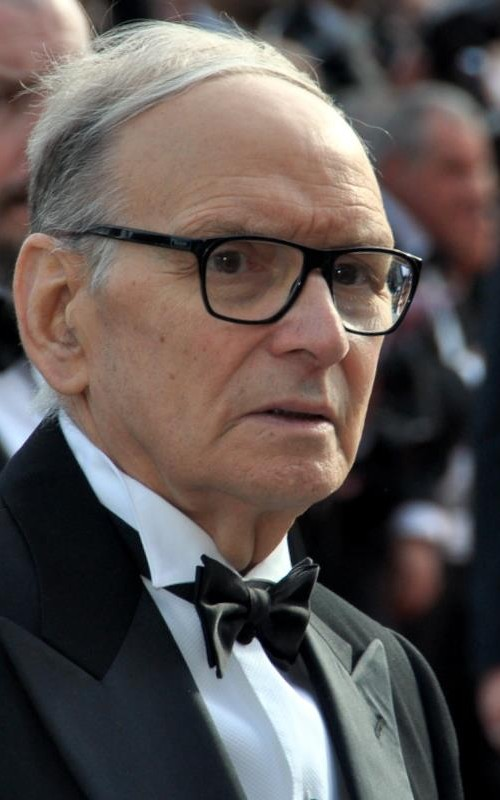
Ennio Morricone

This is a selected list of music artists who have covered or sampled one or more songs which were composed by the Italian composer Ennio Morricone. Over the past 7 decades, Ennio Morricone has composed over 500 scores for cinema and television, as well as over 100 classical works. He composes a wide range of music styles, making him one of the most versatile, experimental and influential composers of all time, working in any medium.

Many albums have been created in dedication to the composer. Ennio Morricone is considered as one of the most sampled artists of all time. Hundreds of hip-hop backing tracks contain audio sampled from Morricone's compositions for Westerns, the Italian subgenre of thrillers, known as giallo, television series, as well as Hollywood films.

== Background ==
Throughout his career Morricone has composed songs for several national and international pop artists including Gianni Morandi (Go Kart Twist, 1962), Alberto Lionello (La donna che vale, 1959), Edoardo Vianello (Ornella, 1960; Cicciona cha-cha, 1960; Faccio finta di dormire, 1961; T'ho conosciuta, 1963; ), Nora Orlandi (Arianna, 1960), Jimmy Fontana (Twist no. 9; Nicole, 1962), Rita Pavone (Pel di carota from 1962, arranged by Luis Bacalov), Catherine Spaak (Penso a te; Questi vent'anni miei, 1964), Luigi Tenco (Quello che conta; Tra tanta gente; 1962), Gino Paoli (Nel corso from 1963, written by Morricone with Paoli), Renato Rascel (Scirocco, 1964), Paul Anka (Ogni Volta), Amii Stewart, Rosy Armen (L'Amore Gira), Milva (Ridevi, Metti Una Sera A Cena), Françoise Hardy (Je changerais d'avis, 1966), Mireille Mathieu (Mon ami de toujours; Pas vu, pas pris, 1971; J'oublie la pluie et le soleil, 1974) and Demis Roussos (I Like The World, 1970).

Another particular success was his composition, "Se telefonando", performed by Mina. The song was covered by several performers in Italy and abroad most notably by Françoise Hardy and Iva Zanicchi (1966), Delta V (2005), Vanessa and the O's (2007), and Neil Hannon (2008).

In 1987 Morricone co-wrote 'It Couldn't Happen Here' with the Pet Shop Boys. Other notable compositions for international artists include: La metà di me and Immagina (1988) by Ruggero Raimondi, Libera l'amore (1989) performed by Zucchero, Love Affair (1994) by k.d. lang, Ha fatto un sogno (1997) by Antonello Venditti, Di Più (1997) by Tiziana Tosca Donati, Come un fiume tu (1998), Un Canto (1998) and Conradian (2006) by Andrea Bocelli, Ricordare (1998) and Salmo (2000) by Angelo Branduardi and My heart and I (2001) by Sting.

A tribute album entitled, We All Love Ennio Morricone was released in 2007 in his honor.

== Selected list ==
Artists who have covered or sampled Morricone's compositions include:

Film composers

- Luis Bacalov
- Marco Beltrami
- Michel Colombier
- Carl Davis
- Alexandre Desplat
- Anne Dudley
- Harry Gregson-Williams
- Alan Howarth
- Hugo Montenegro
- Michiko Naruke
- Gustavo Santaolalla
- Hans Zimmer

Jazz musicians/singers

- Karrin Allyson
- Chris Botti
- Al Caiola
- Herbie Hancock
- Quincy Jones
- Dave Koz
- John Zorn

Classical musicians/singers

- Susanna Rigacci
- Andrea Bocelli
- Escala
- Il Volo
- Renée Fleming
- Josh Groban
- Katherine Jenkins
- Yo-Yo Ma
- Fausto Papetti
- Dulce Pontes
- André Rieu

Pop artists

- Paul Anka
- Sarah Brightman
- Céline Dion
- Dalida
- Erasure
- Jovanotti
- Michael Jackson feat. Slash
- Mireille Mathieu
- Milva
- Mina
- Georges Moustaki
- Gianni Morandi
- Rita Pavone
- Patty Pravo
- The Sandpipers
- Amii Stewart
- The Wanted
- Hayley Westenra

Rock artists

- Alvarius B.
- Babe Ruth
- Big Audio Dynamite
- Bruce Springsteen
- Calibro 35
- Fantômas
- The Golden Palominos
- Goldrush
- Hank Marvin
- Cibo Matto
- Metallica
- The Mars Volta
- Monkey3
- Muse
- Mike Patton
- Nanowar of Steel
- The Pogues
- The Ramones
- Revolting Cocks
- Kid Rock
- The Shadows
- Sin City Sinners
- The Vandals
- The Ventures

Hip hop/Soul/Reggae artists

- Atmosphere
- DJ Babu
- Joey Badass
- Bad Balance
- Big Lurch
- Bone Thugs-n-Harmony
- Bounty Killer
- Busta Rhymes
- Cameo
- Compton's Most Wanted
- Coolio
- Depth Charge
- Dreadzone
- Eminem
- EPMD
- G-Unit
- Gorillaz
- GZA
- Immortal Technique
- Jay-Z
- LL Cool J
- Mack 10
- MC Hammer
- MC Solaar
- Method Man
- Mobb Deep
- Necro
- Raekwon
- Sadat X
- Shinehead
- Slick Rick
- Snoop Dogg
- Stereo MCs
- Suga Free
- Wu-Tang Clan

Electronic/Dance artists

- Amon Tobin
- Apollo 440
- Bomb the Bass
- Coldcut
- Beats International
- Deee-Lite
- Dr. Kucho!
- Ed Starink
- Fantastic Plastic Machine
- Flying Lotus
- The Future Sound of London
- Goldfrapp
- Jigsy King
- Jonzun Crew
- Massive Attack
- Norman Cook
- The Orb
- Thievery Corporation
- Pierre Henry
- Planet Funk
- The Prodigy

MPB artists

- Aymoréco

Artist	Song	Year of Release	Album Release	Comment
Agnetha	"Geh Mitt Uns"	1972	"Agnetha - Geh mitt Gott"	
Alessandro Alessandroni	"Per qualche dollaro in più"	2005	Morricone Western	
Alessandro Alessandroni	"Per un pugno di dollari"	2005	Morricone Western	
Alessandro Alessandroni	"Una Pistola per Ringo"	2005	Morricone Western	
Amii Stewart	"My Heart and I"	1990	Pearls – Amii Stewart Sings Ennio Morricone	
Amii Stewart	"Desire (Chi Mai)"	1990	Pearls – Amii Stewart Sings Ennio Morricone	
Amii Stewart	"Hurry to Me"	1990	Pearls – Amii Stewart Sings Ennio Morricone	
Amii Stewart	"Come Sail Away"	1990	Pearls – Amii Stewart Sings Ennio Morricone	
Amii Stewart	"Here's to You"	1990	Pearls – Amii Stewart Sings Ennio Morricone	
Amii Stewart	"Song for Elena"	1990	Pearls – Amii Stewart Sings Ennio Morricone	
Amii Stewart	"One Love"	1990	Pearls – Amii Stewart Sings Ennio Morricone	
Amii Stewart	"Saharan Dream"	1990	Pearls – Amii Stewart Sings Ennio Morricone	
Amii Stewart	"Sean Sean"	1990	Pearls – Amii Stewart Sings Ennio Morricone	
Amii Stewart	"Could Heaven Be"	1990	Pearls – Amii Stewart Sings Ennio Morricone	
Romina Arena	"Ti Ho Amato"	2012	"Morricone Uncovered"	
Romina Arena	"What Can I Do "	2012	"Morricone Uncovered"	
Romina Arena	"Il Cuore Mio - Mi Corazon"	2012	"Morricone Uncovered"	
Romina Arena	"The Woman in Me"	2012	"Morricone Uncovered"	
Romina Arena	"Saying Goodbye"	2012	"Morricone Uncovered"	
Romina Arena	"Gioco D'Amore"	2012	"Morricone Uncovered"	
Romina Arena	"Solo Noi"	2012	"Morricone Uncovered"	
Romina Arena	"Ritornerai Dolce Amore"	2012	"Morricone Uncovered"	
Romina Arena	"Return to Me"	2012	"Morricone Uncovered"	
Romina Arena	"Le Vent et le Cri"	2012	"Morricone Uncovered"	
Romina Arena	"E un Attimo"	2012	"Morricone Uncovered"	
Romina Arena	"Requiem of Love"	2012	"Morricone Uncovered"	
Romina Arena	"Il Tempo Sa"	2012	"Morricone Uncovered"	
Romina Arena	"Morir D'Amore - I Die a Little"	2012	"Morricone Uncovered"	
Romina Arena	"Se Non Fossi Tu - This Kind of Love"	2012	"Morricone Uncovered"	
Dino	"Ho Messo Gli Occhi Su Di Te"	1998	"Canto Morricone Vol. 1 - The 60's"	
Dino	"Thrilling"	1998	"Canto Morricone Vol. 1 - The 60's"	
Mina	"Se Telefonando"	1998	"Canto Morricone Vol. 1 - The 60's"	
Gino Paoli	"Sapore Di Sale"	1998	"Canto Morricone Vol. 1 - The 60's"	
Milva	"Quattro Vestiti"	1998	"Canto Morricone Vol. 1 - The 60's"	
Lisa Gastoni	"Una Stanza Vuota"	1998	"Canto Morricone Vol. 1 - The 60's"	
Anna Moffo	"In Fondo Agli Occhi Miei"	1998	"Canto Morricone Vol. 1 - The 60's"	
Fausto Cigliano	"Nuddu"	1998	"Canto Morricone Vol. 1 - The 60's"	
Catherine Spaak	"Questi Vent' Anni Miei"	1998	"Canto Morricone Vol. 1 - The 60's"	
Luigi Tenco	"Tra Tanta Gente"	1998	"Canto Morricone Vol. 1 - The 60's"	
Francoise Hardy	"Je Changerais D'Avis (Se Telefonando)"	1998	"Canto Morricone Vol. 1 - The 60's"	
Mina	"Il Disco Rotto"	1998	"Canto Morricone Vol. 1 - The 60's"	
The Sandpipers	"Hurry To Me"	1998	"Canto Morricone Vol. 1 - The 60's"	
Catherine Spaak	"Penso A Te"	1998	"Canto Morricone Vol. 1 - The 60's"	
Luigi Tenco	"Quello Che Conta"	1998	"Canto Morricone Vol. 1 - The 60's"	
Astrud Gilberto	"Funny World"	1998	"Canto Morricone Vol. 1 - The 60's"	
Fausto Cigliano	"Cantata Basilisca (The Lizard Song)"	1998	"Canto Morricone Vol. 1 - The 60's"	
Miranda Martino	"Scetate (Wake Up)"	1998	"Canto Morricone Vol. 1 - The 60's"	
Philip Aaberg	"Nuovo cinema Paradiso"	2003	"We Love Morricone"	
Mike Abene	"Nuovo cinema Paradiso"	1998	Anita Gravine - Lights! Camera! Passion! - Jazz and the Italian cinema	
Allen Toussaint	"The Untouchables (End Title)"	1988	The Allen Toussaint Orchestra (and others) - The Music of Ennio Morricone	
Karrin Allyson	"That Day"	1999	Karrin Allyson - From Paris to Rio	
Mathé Altéry	"A l'aube du cinquième jour"	1970	Mathé Altery - A l'aube du cinquième jour	
Alvarius B.	"Dirty Angels"	2005	Alvarius B - Blood Operatives of the Barium Sunset	
Alvarius B.	"The Dinner Party"	2005	Alvarius B - Baroque Primitiva	
Alvarius B.	"Mussolini's Exit"	2005	Alvarius B - Baroque Primitiva Sunset	
Alvarius B.	"Naturally Absolute"	2005	Alvarius B - Baroque Primitiva Sunset	
Alvarius B.	" La Cosa buffa "	2005	Alvarius B - Baroque Primitiva	
Alvarius B.	"Quattro mosche di velluto grigio"	2005	Alvarius B - Baroque Primitiva	
Articolo 31	"Il mondo dove vivo"	1998	Articolo 31 - Nessuno	
Isabelle Aubret	"Liberté"	1981	Isabelle Aubret - Liberté	
Luis Bacalov	"Gabriel's oboe"	2001	Cinema Italiano	
Claudio Baglioni	"Giù la testa"	1997	Claudio Baglioni - Anime in gioco	
The Bambi Molesters	"A Gun for Ringo"	2002	For a Few Guitars More: A Tribute to Morricone's Spaghetti Western Themes	
Enrico Pieranunzi, Marc Johnson, Joey Baron	"Addio fratello crudele"	2001	Enrico Pieranunzi, Marc Johnson, Joey Baron Play Morricone	
Enrico Pieranunzi, Marc Johnson, Joey Baron	"Mio caro dottor Gräsler"	2001	Enrico Pieranunzi, Marc Johnson, Joey Baron Play Morricone	
Enrico Pieranunzi, Marc Johnson, Joey Baron	"La Voglia matta"	2001	Enrico Pieranunzi, Marc Johnson, Joey Baron Play Morricone	
Enrico Pieranunzi, Marc Johnson, Joey Baron	"Incontro"	2001	Enrico Pieranunzi, Marc Johnson, Joey Baron Play Morricone	
Enrico Pieranunzi, Marc Johnson, Joey Baron	"Jona che visse nella balena"	2001	Enrico Pieranunzi, Marc Johnson, Joey Baron Play Morricone	
Enrico Pieranunzi, Marc Johnson, Joey Baron	"Le Mani sporche"	2001	Enrico Pieranunzi, Marc Johnson, Joey Baron Play Morricone	
Enrico Pieranunzi, Marc Johnson, Joey Baron	"Correva l'anno di grazia 1870"	2001	Enrico Pieranunzi, Marc Johnson, Joey Baron Play Morricone	
Enrico Pieranunzi, Marc Johnson, Joey Baron	"Escalation "	2001	Enrico Pieranunzi, Marc Johnson, Joey Baron Play Morricone	
Enrico Pieranunzi, Marc Johnson, Joey Baron	"Stanno tutti bene"	2001	Enrico Pieranunzi, Marc Johnson, Joey Baron Play Morricone	
Enrico Pieranunzi, Marc Johnson, Joey Baron	"Quando le donne avevano la coda"	2001	Enrico Pieranunzi, Marc Johnson, Joey Baron Play Morricone	
MC Solaar	"Le Clan des Siciliens"	1997	M.C. Solaar - Paradisiaque	
Sarah Brightman	"Nella Fantasia"	1998	Eden	
Sarah Brightman	"La Califfa"	2000	La Luna	
BBC Concert Orchestra, Anne Dudley	"Chi Mai"	2003	Anne Dudley - Seriously Chilled	
Beck	" Allegretto per signora "	1997	Plastic Cowboy - Live in Deutschland	
Marco Beltrami	"God's Country Music"	2011	Marco Beltrami - The Thing	
Benjamin Diamond	"Sans mobile apparent"	2003	Cinemix	
City of Prague Philharmonic Orchestra	"Cinema paradiso"	1993	Cinema Paradiso - The Classic Ennio Morricone	
City of Prague Philharmonic Orchestra	"Gabriel's oboe"	1993	Cinema Paradiso - The Classic Ennio Morricone	
City of Prague Philharmonic Orchestra	" The good, the bad and the ugly"	1993	Cinema Paradiso - The Classic Ennio Morricone	
City of Prague Philharmonic Orchestra	"Deborah's theme "	1993	Cinema Paradiso - The Classic Ennio Morricone	
City of Prague Philharmonic Orchestra	"Two mules for Sister Sara"	1993	Cinema Paradiso - The Classic Ennio Morricone	
City of Prague Philharmonic Orchestra	"Marco Polo"	1993	Cinema Paradiso - The Classic Ennio Morricone	
City of Prague Philharmonic Orchestra	" Suite from C'era una volta il west "	1993	Cinema Paradiso - The Classic Ennio Morricone	
City of Prague Philharmonic Orchestra	"The mission"	1993	Cinema Paradiso - The Classic Ennio Morricone	
City of Prague Philharmonic Orchestra	"Romanzo"	1993	Cinema Paradiso - The Classic Ennio Morricone	
City of Prague Philharmonic Orchestra	"In the line of fire"	1993	Cinema Paradiso - The Classic Ennio Morricone	
City of Prague Philharmonic Orchestra	"Death theme"	1993	Cinema Paradiso - The Classic Ennio Morricone	
City of Prague Philharmonic Orchestra	"Red Sonja"	1993	Cinema Paradiso - The Classic Ennio Morricone	
City of Prague Philharmonic Orchestra	" Main title from A Fistful of Dollars"	1993	Cinema Paradiso - The Classic Ennio Morricone	
City of Prague Philharmonic Orchestra	"Hamlet "	1993	Cinema Paradiso - The Classic Ennio Morricone	
City of Prague Philharmonic Orchestra	"A fistful of dynamite"	1993	Cinema Paradiso - The Classic Ennio Morricone	
City of Prague Philharmonic Orchestra	"The Thing"	1993	Cinema Paradiso - The Classic Ennio Morricone	
City of Prague Philharmonic Orchestra	"The ecstasy of gold"	1993	Cinema Paradiso - The Classic Ennio Morricone	
City of Prague Philharmonic Orchestra	"On earth as it is in heaven"	1993	Cinema Paradiso - The Classic Ennio Morricone	
City of Prague Philharmonic Orchestra	"Elegy for Brown"	1996	The Mission - The Classic Film Music of Ennio Morricone	
City of Prague Philharmonic Orchestra	"The man with the harmonica"	1996	The Mission - The Classic Film Music of Ennio Morricone	
City of Prague Philharmonic Orchestra	"The good, the bad and the ugly"	1996	The Mission - The Classic Film Music of Ennio Morricone	
City of Prague Philharmonic Orchestra	"The Ecstasy of Gold"	1996	The Mission - The Classic Film Music of Ennio Morricone	
City of Prague Philharmonic Orchestra	"Chi mai"	1996	The Mission - The Classic Film Music of Ennio Morricone	
City of Prague Philharmonic Orchestra	"Romanzo"	1996	The Mission - The Classic Film Music of Ennio Morricone	
City of Prague Philharmonic Orchestra	"Deborah's Theme"	1996	The Mission - The Classic Film Music of Ennio Morricone	
City of Prague Philharmonic Orchestra	"For a Few Dollars More"	1996	The Mission - The Classic Film Music of Ennio Morricone	
City of Prague Philharmonic Orchestra	"Once Upon a Time in America"	1996	The Mission - The Classic Film Music of Ennio Morricone	
City of Prague Philharmonic Orchestra	"A Fistful of Dollars"	1996	The Mission - The Classic Film Music of Ennio Morricone	
City of Prague Philharmonic Orchestra	"The Mission"	1996	The Mission - The Classic Film Music of Ennio Morricone	
City of Prague Philharmonic Orchestra	"On earth as it is in heaven"	1996	The Mission - The Classic Film Music of Ennio Morricone	
City of Prague Philharmonic Orchestra	"Falls"	1996	The Mission - The Classic Film Music of Ennio Morricone	
City of Prague Philharmonic Orchestra	"The untouchables"	1996	The Mission - The Classic Film Music of Ennio Morricone	
Berlin Philharmonic	" Man With the Harmonica"	2004	Berliner Philharmoniker - As Time Goes By	
Cameo	"The good, the bad and the ugly"	1985	Single Life	sampled in "Single Life"
Cameo	"The good, the bad and the ugly"	1986	Word Up	sampled in "Word Up"
Richard Clayderman	"A Fistful Of Dynamite"	1990	"The Fantastic Movie Story Of Ennio Morricone"	
Richard Clayderman	"Once Upon A Time In The West"	1990	"The Fantastic Movie Story Of Ennio Morricone"	
Richard Clayderman	"Lontano (From "God With Us")"	1990	"The Fantastic Movie Story Of Ennio Morricone"	
Richard Clayderman	"Il Clan Dei Siciliana"	1990	"The Fantastic Movie Story Of Ennio Morricone"	
Richard Clayderman	"My Name Is Nobody"	1990	"The Fantastic Movie Story Of Ennio Morricone"	
Richard Clayderman	"Chi Mai"	1990	"The Fantastic Movie Story Of Ennio Morricone	
Richard Clayderman	"Intermezzo"	1990	"The Fantastic Movie Story Of Ennio Morricone	
Richard Clayderman	"Here's To You"	1990	"The Fantastic Movie Story Of Ennio Morricone	
Richard Clayderman	"L' Aventuriero"	1990	"The Fantastic Movie Story Of Ennio Morricone	
Richard Clayderman	"Cosi Como Sei"	1990	"The Fantastic Movie Story Of Ennio Morricone	
Richard Clayderman	"La Ballata Di Sacco E Vanzetti"	1990	"The Fantastic Movie Story Of Ennio Morricone	
Richard Clayderman	"Tema Di Mose"	1990	"The Fantastic Movie Story Of Ennio Morricone	
Richard Clayderman	"For A Few Dollars More"	1990	"The Fantastic Movie Story Of Ennio Morricone	
Richard Clayderman	"Metello"	1990	"The Fantastic Movie Story Of Ennio Morricone	
Richard Clayderman	"Il Maestro E Margherita"	1990	"The Fantastic Movie Story Of Ennio Morricone	
Richard Clayderman	"Gabriel's Oboe (From "The Mission")"	1990	"The Fantastic Movie Story Of Ennio Morricone	
Richard Clayderman	"Saharan Dreams"	1990	"The Fantastic Movie Story Of Ennio Morricone	
Andrea Bocelli	"Your Love"	2011	Andrea Bocelli - Concerto: One Night in Central Park	
Andrea Bocelli	"E più ti penso"	2015	Andrea Bocelli - Cinema	
Andrea Bocelli	" Come un fiume tu "	1998	Sogno	
Andrea Bocelli	"Un Canto "	1998	Sogno	
Jean-Claude Borelly	"Il était une fois dans l'Ouest"	1981	Jean-Claude Borelly - Le meilleur de la trompette	
Chris Botti	"Cinema Paradiso"	2004	When I Fall in Love	
Chris Botti	"Cinema Paradiso"	2004	When I Fall in Love	
Gustav Brom	"Escalation"	1987	Musiques de films - Movie Melodies vol.4	
Roy Budd	"Hurry to Me"	1997	Roy Budd - Rebirth of the Budd	
Mr. Bungle	"Città violenta"	1992		Performed live during several concerts
Gilda Buttà	"Mosè "	2010	Absolutely Ennio Morricone	
Gilda Buttà	"Rag in frantumi"	2010	Absolutely Ennio Morricone	
Gilda Buttà	"Lolita"	2010	Absolutely Ennio Morricone	
Gilda Buttà	"Playing Love"	2010	Absolutely Ennio Morricone	
Gilda Buttà	"Fragmenta of Mission"	2010	Absolutely Ennio Morricone	
Gilda Buttà	"Once Upon a Time In the West"	2010	Absolutely Ennio Morricone	
Gilda Buttà	"Romanza"	2010	Absolutely Ennio Morricone	
Gilda Buttà	"Gabriel's Oboe"	2010	Absolutely Ennio Morricone	
Gilda Buttà	"Ricercare"	2010	Absolutely Ennio Morricone	
Gilda Buttà	"Canone"	2010	Absolutely Ennio Morricone	
Gilda Buttà	"Monodia"	2010	Absolutely Ennio Morricone	
Regina Carter, Jorge Calandrelli	"Cinema Paradiso"	2003	Paganini, After a Dream	
California Guitar Trio	"The good, the bad and the ugly"	2009-		Performed live during concerts
California Guitar Trio	"The good, the bad and the ugly"	2009-		Performed live during concerts
Alex Callier (Hooverphonic)	"Barabas"	1996	A New Stereophonic Sound Spectacular	includes sample from "L'Attentat" (1972)
Mario Cavallero	" Et pour quelques dollars de plus"	1991	"Music from famous westerns vol.2"	
Mario Cavallero	"Sixty seconds to what"	1991	"Music from famous westerns vol.2"	
Mario Cavallero	"Un pistolet pour Ringo"	1991	"Music from famous westerns vol.2"	
Mario Cavallero	"Le carnaval des truands"	1991	"Music from famous westerns vol.2"	
Mario Cavallero	"La cité de la violence"	1991	"Music from famous westerns vol.2"	
Mario Cavallero	" L'amas sauvage"	1991	"Music from famous westerns vol.2"	
Mario Cavallero	"L'adieu à Cheyenne"	1991	"Music from famous westerns vol.2"	
Mario Cavallero	" L'attentat"	1991	"Music from famous westerns vol.2"	
Mario Cavallero	"A l'aube du cinquième jour"	1991	"Music from famous westerns vol.2"	
The Celtic Tenors	"Nella Fantasia"	2002	"The Celtic Tenors - So Strong"	
Celtic Woman	"Nella Fantasia"	2002	Celtic Woman	
Eugene Chadbourne	"Magic and ecstasy"	1998	"The insect and western party"	
Jay-Z	"The Blueprint 2: The Gift & The Curse"	2002	The Blueprint 2: The Gift & The Curse	include sample from The Good, the Bad & the Ugly
Chicken Lips	"Teorema"	2004	"Ennio Morricone Remixes Vol. 2"	
Cincinnati Pops Orchestra	"The Untouchables: Main Theme"	1991	"Bond and Beyond"	
Cincinnati Pops Orchestra	"Al Capone"	1991	"Bond and Beyond"	
Cincinnati Pops Orchestra	"Act of Faith"	1997	"Beautiful Hollywood"	
Cincinnati Pops Orchestra	"On Earth as it is in Heaven"	1997	"Beautiful Hollywood"	
Cincinnati Pops Orchestra	"Love Theme from Cinema Paradiso"	1997	"Beautiful Hollywood"	
John Coleman, Iris Williams	"Dearest Friend"	1981	"Iris Williams - Beautiful"	
Michel Colombier	"Il était une fois la révolution"	1973	"Francis Lai"	
Michel Colombier	"Metello"	1973	"Francis Lai"	
Mase	"F##!* me, F##!* you"	1999	Double Up	contains sample from The Untouchables
Metallica	"The Ecstasy of Gold"	2009	We All Love Ennio Morricone	
Coolio	"Change (vs. Ennio Morricone)"	2008	From the Bottom 2 the Top	contains sample from The Ecstasy of Gold
Costa Cordalis	"Die Liebe bist du"	1972	"Costa Cordalis - Die großen Erfolge"	contains music from Once Upon a Time in the West
Thievery Corporation	"Il Grande silenzio"	2001	"Morricone RMX"	
Crazy Baldhead	"Tema Di Mosè"	2003	"Ennio Morricone Remixes Taster"	
Czech Philharmonic	"Gabriel's oboe"	2003	"Znedek Adam - Concerto sentimento lyrico"	
Dalida	"Le clan des Siciliens"	1969	Dalida - Le clan des Siciliens	
Carl Davis, Royal Philharmonic Orchestra	"For a Few Dollars More"	2004	Carl Davis - Great Western Themes	
Carl Davis, Royal Philharmonic Orchestra	"The Good, the Bad and the Ugly"	2004	Carl Davis - Great Western Themes	
Carl Davis, Royal Philharmonic Orchestra	"Once Upon a Time in the West"	2004	Carl Davis - Great Western Themes	
Carl Davis, Royal Philharmonic Orchestra	"A Fistful of Dollars"	2004	Carl Davis - Great Western Themes	
Guido & Maurizio De Angelis	"L'amore è un cucciolo de razza"	1973	L'amore è un cucciolo de razza	contains music from Anche se volessi lavorare, che faccio?
Johan de Meij	"Moment for Morricone - part 1-6"	NA	Moment for Morricone	contains music from The Good, the Bad & the Ugly
De-Phazz	"La lucertola"	2001	Morricone RMX	contains music from Una Lucertola con la pelle di donna
Edda Dell'Orso	"C'era una volta il West"	1986	Edda's Classical Machine	
Edda Dell'Orso	"Giù la testa"	1986	Edda's Classical Machine	
Edda Dell'Orso	"Chi mai"	1986	Edda's Classical Machine	
Edda Dell'Orso	"Metti una sera a cena"	1986	Edda's Classical Machine	
Edda Dell'Orso	"Il clan dei Siciliani"	1986	Edda's Classical Machine	
Edda Dell'Orso	"Per un pugno di dollari"	1986	Edda's Classical Machine	
Edda Dell'Orso	"Il fischio"	1986	Edda's Classical Machine	
Edda Dell'Orso	"Il buono, il brutto, il cattivo"	1986	Edda's Classical Machine	
Edda Dell'Orso	"Marco Polo"	1986	Edda's Classical Machine	
Edda Dell'Orso	"L'uomo dell'armonica"	1986	Edda's Classical Machine	
Eumir Deodato	"Cun migo"	2006	We All Love Ennio Morricone	
Alexandre Desplat & the Traffic Quartet	"Peur Sur La Ville"	2007	Traffic Quintet - Nouvelles Vagues	
Céline Dion	"I Knew I Love You"	2007	We All Love Ennio Morricone	also performed live at - Kodak Theatre, Los Angeles, USA
Down Low	"Once Upon a Time"	1998	Third Dimension	contains sample of "Once Upon a Time in the West"
David Downes	"Nella fantasia"	2005	Celtic Woman	
Angèle Dubeau	"Il était une fois... le diable"	2000	Angèle Dubeau & La Pietà - Violons d'enfer	
Angèle Dubeau	"The Mission"	2002	Angèle Dubeau & La Pietà - Violons du monde	
Angèle Dubeau	"Buona fortuna Jack"	2007	Angèle Dubeau & La Pièta - Un conte de fées - Fairy Tale	
Angèle Dubeau	"Lady Caliph"	2007	Angèle Dubeau & La Pièta - Un conte de fées - Fairy Tale	
Angèle Dubeau	"Thème d'amour"	2012	Angèle Dubeau & La Pietà - Silence, on joue! / A Time For Us	
Anne Dudley	"Chi Mai"	2003	Anne Dudley - Seriously Chilled	
Billy Duffy	"The Good, the Bad & the Ugly"	1992	Ruby Trax, The NME's Roaring Forty	
Erasure	"The Good, the Bad & the Ugly"	1998	Erasure - Chains of love	
Fantômas	"Investigation of a citizen above suspicion"	2001	Fantomas - The Director's Cut	
Paul Ferguson	"Cinema Paradiso"	1994	Michael Chertock - Cinematic Piano	
Fields of the Nephilim	"Intro - The harmonica man"		includes sample from "A Man with Harmonica"	
Carolin Fortenbacher	"Der hellste Stern"	2008	Carolin Fortenbacher - Drama	includes music from "Once Upon a Time in the West"
Apollo 440	"The Man with Harmonica"	2001	Morricone RMX	
Denny Freeman	"The Good, the Bad & the Ugly"	1985	Four big guitars from Texas - Trash, twang and thunder	
Giorgia Fumanti	"Your Love"	2007	Giorgia Fumanti - From My Heart	contains music from "Once Upon a Time in the West"
Giorgia Fumanti	"A Rose Among Thorns"	2007	Giorgia Fumanti - From My Heart	contains music from "The Mission"
Giorgia Fumanti	"My Heart and I"	2007	Giorgia Fumanti - From My Heart	contains music from "La Piovra 5: Il cuore del problema"
Giorgia Fumanti	"Love Theme from Cinema Paradiso"	2007	Giorgia Fumanti - From My Heart	"
Giorgia Fumanti	"C'era una volta la terra mia"	2007	Giorgia Fumanti - From My Heart	
Goldfrapp	"Felt Mountain"	2000	Felt Mountain	contains music from "A Fistful of Dynamite"
Goldfrapp	"Utopia"	2000	Felt Mountain	contains music from "Le Clan des Siciliens"
Josh Groban	"You're still you"	2001	Josh Groban	contains music from "Malèna"
John Williams	"Once Upon a Time in the West"	1996	John Williams Plays the Movies	
Steve Hackett	"Cinema Paradiso"	1994	Steve Hackett - There are many sides to the night	
Charlie Haden, Pat Metheny	"Cinema Paradiso"	1997	Beyond the Missouri Sky (Short Stories)	
Charlie Haden, Pat Metheny	"Love Theme "	1997	Beyond the Missouri Sky (Short Stories)	
Herbie Hancock	"The Good, the Bad and the Ugly"	2006	We All Love Ennio Morricone	
Johnny Hartman	"Funny World"	1965	Johnny Hartman - The voice that is!	contains music from I Malamondo
Hermes House Band	"The Good, the Bad and the Ugly"	1992	Hermes House Band – Thuis	live recording
Etta Scollo	"Se Telefonando"	2011	Etta Scollo - Cuoresenza	
Sly and Robbie	"The Good, the Bad & the Ugly"	1997	Sly & Robbie - Mambo taxi	

== See also ==
- List of compositions by Ennio Morricone
