= Knock on Wood =

Knock on Wood may refer to:

- Knocking on wood, an act of superstition

== Music ==
- Knock on Wood (Eddie Floyd album), 1967
  - "Knock on Wood" (Eddie Floyd song), a 1966 song, covered by many performers
- Knock on Wood (Amii Stewart album), 1979, or its title track, a cover of the previously mentioned Eddie Floyd song
- Knock on Wood – The Best of Amii Stewart, a 1996 album
- Knock on Wood (The Young Gods album), 2008
- "Knock on Wood" (1942 song), a song written by M. K. Jerome and Jack Scholl, from the film Casablanca
- "Knock on Wood", the title song to the 1954 film, written by Sylvia Fine
- "Knock on Wood", a song by Prefab Sprout from From Langley Park to Memphis, 1988
- "The Impression That I Get", a 1997 song by The Mighty Mighty Bosstones which repeatedly contains the phrase "knock on wood"

== Film and television ==
- Knock on Wood (film), a 1954 comedy starring Danny Kaye
- Knock on Wood (1981 film) or La Chèvre, a French comedy by Francis Veber
- "Knock on Wood" (Little Einsteins episode), 2006
