= All of Me (Amii Stewart album) =

Greatest hits album by Amii Stewart
- Released: 1995
- Recorded: 1978–1995
- Genre: R&B, pop, disco
- Label: RCA Victor Europe

Amii Stewart chronology
The Men I Love (1995)	All of Me (1995)	Love Affair (1996)

All of Me is a greatest hits album of recordings by Amii Stewart released in Europe in 1995. The album includes most of Stewart's greatest hits and single releases until that point, from her career as a disco diva through her '80s and '90s collaborations with Mike Francis, Giorgio Moroder, Bolland & Bolland and Ennio Morricone.

== Track listing ==
1. "Knock on Wood" (1985 Remix) – 4:05
2. "Jealousy" (1985 Remix) – 5:50
3. "Working Late Tonight" – 4:04
4. "That Loving Feeling" – 4:33
5. "Fever Line" – 4:51
6. "Try Love" – 3:45
7. "Friends" – 4:39
8. "Together" (duet with Mike Francis) – 4:29
9. "Time Is Tight" – 4:13
10. "Lover to Lover" – 4:16
11. "Break These Chains" – 4:33
12. "Love Ain't No Toy" – 4:59
13. "Saharan Dream" – 3:05
14. "It's Fantasy" – 4:16
15. "Dusty Road" – 4:33
16. "My Heart and I" – 4:56
17. "Sean Sean" – 3:36
18. "Grazie Perché (We've Got Tonite)" (duet with Gianni Morandi) – 3:48

== Personnel ==
- Amii Stewart – vocals
