= All of Me =

All of Me may refer to:

== Film and television ==
- All of Me (1934 film), an American drama starring Fredric March
- All of Me (1984 film), an American comedy starring Steve Martin and Lily Tomlin
- All of Me (2014 film), an American documentary about obesity and weight loss surgery
- All of Me (TV series), a 2015 Philippine television series
- "All of Me" (Grey's Anatomy), a 2018 television episode
- "All of Me" (Roseanne), a 1990 television episode

== Literature ==
- All of Me, a 2009 autobiography by Anne Murray

== Music ==
=== Albums ===
- All of Me (Amii Stewart album), 1995
- All of Me (Anne Murray album), 2005
- All of Me (Eddie "Lockjaw" Davis album), 1983
- All of Me (Estelle album), 2012
- All of Me (John Pizzarelli album), 1992
- All Of Me, by Masayoshi Takanaka, 1979
- All of Me: The Debonair Mr. Hartman, by Johnny Hartman, 1957
- All of Me – Live in Concert, by Willie Nelson, 2002

=== Songs ===
- "All of Me" (jazz standard), a 1931 popular song and jazz standard written by Gerald Marks and Seymour Simons
- "All of Me" (21 Savage song), 2024
- "All of Me" (John Legend song), 2013
- "All of Me (Boy Oh Boy)", by Sabrina Salerno, 1988
- "All of Me", by 50 Cent from Curtis, 2007
- "All of Me", by Matt Hammitt from Every Falling Tear, 2011
- "All of Me", by the Piano Guys from Hits Volume 1, 2011
- "All of Me", by the Score featuring Travis Barker, 2020

== See also ==
- Playboy: Farrah Fawcett, All of Me, a 1998 video starring Farrah Fawcett
- All of You (disambiguation)
