= The Greatest Hits (Amii Stewart album) =

Greatest hits album by Amii Stewart
- Released: 2005
- Recorded: 1978–1985
- Genre: R&B, pop, disco
- Label: Empire Musicwerks

Amii Stewart chronology
Lady Day (2004)	The Greatest Hits (2005)

The Greatest Hits is a compilation album of recordings by Amii Stewart released in 2005 by Empire Musicwerks. The album is more or less a re-release of Hot Productions' 1996 compilation Knock On Wood - The Best Of Amii Stewart with a few changes. While this edition is digitally remastered it omits 1985 hit "Friends" and replaces it with the instrumental reprise of "Paradise Bird".

== Track listing ==
1. "Knock on Wood" (Album version) - 6:13
2. "You Really Touched My Heart" - 4:29
3. "Light My Fire" / "137 Disco Heaven" (Album version) - 8:26
4. "Bring It On Back To Me" - 3:56
5. "My Guy, My Girl" (1985 version feat. Deon Estus) - 4:31
6. "Get Your Love Back" - 3:56
7. "The Letter" (Album version) - 6:58
8. "Paradise Bird" (Album version) - 6:35
9. "Jealousy" (Album version) - 6:09
10. "Right Place, Wrong Time" - 5:07
11. "Step Into The Love Line" - 5:23
12. "Why'd You Have To Be So Sexy" (Extended version) - 5:20
13. "Where Did Our Love Go" (Album version) - 4:26
14. "Paradise Found" (Instrumental) - 2:26

== Personnel ==
- Amii Stewart - vocals
- Barry Leng - backing vocals, guitar
- Charles Angins, Gerry Morris, Jimmy Chambers, & Tony Jackson - backing vocals
- Gerry Morris - bass guitar
- Adrian Shepard - drums
- Alan Murphy - guitar
- Ian Hughes, Ken Freeman, Pete Amesen, & Simon May - keyboards
- Glyn Thomas - percussion

== Production ==
- Producer - Barry Leng (tracks 1 to 11 & 14)
- Producer - Narada Michael Walden (tracks 12 & 13)
- Compilation producer - Paul Klein
- Mastered by - Rick Pantoja
