= The Greatest Hits =

The Greatest Hits may refer to:

- The Greatest Hits (3 Doors Down album), 2012
- The Greatest Hits (Amii Stewart 2005), 2005
- The Greatest Hits (Australian Crawl album), 2014
- The Greatest Hits (Baby Bird album), 1997
- The Greatest Hits (Boney M. 1993), 1993
- The Greatest Hits (Boney M. album), 2001
- The Greatest Hits (Cheap Trick album), 1991
- The Greatest Hits (Cher album), 1999
- The Greatest Hits (Eddy Grant album), 2001
- The Greatest Hits (Five Star album), 2004
- The Greatest Hits (Funkoars album), 2006
- The Greatest Hits (GRITS album), 2007
- The Greatest Hits (Il Divo album), 2012
- The Greatest Hits (INXS album), 1994
- The Greatest Hits (Juvenile album), 2004
- The Greatest Hits (Lil Suzy album), 2003
- The Greatest Hits (Lulu album), 2003
- The Greatest Hits (Newsboys album), 2007
- The Greatest Hits (Russell Morris album), 2008
- The Greatest Hits (Sinitta album), 2010
- The Greatest Hits (Texas album), 2000
- Whitney: The Greatest Hits, a 2000 album by Whitney Houston
- The Greatest Hits (film), a romantic musical film

== See also ==
- Greatest hits album
- List of greatest hits albums
