= Heaven Help Me =

Heaven Help Me may refer to:

- "Heaven Help Me", a song by Deon Estus from the album Spell
- "Heaven Help Me", a song by Lizzo from the album Cuz I Love You
- "Heaven Help Me", a song by Rob Thomas from the album The Great Unknown
- "Heaven Help Me", a song by Wynonna Judd from the album What the World Needs Now Is Love
