= I'm a Rainbow =

- Original standard version released in 1996

Studio album by Donna Summer
- Released: August 20, 1996
- Recorded: March–July 1981
- Length: 72:50
- Labels: Casablanca; Mercury; Chronicles (original release); Driven by the Music (reissues)
- Producers: Giorgio Moroder; Pete Bellotte

Donna Summer chronology
The Wanderer (1980)	I'm a Rainbow (1981)	Donna Summer (1982)

I'm a Rainbow - Recovered & Recoloured
- Remix album released in 2021

Professional ratings
Review scores
Source	Rating
AllMusic	4/5 stars

I'm a Rainbow is the ninth studio album (Note: Third studio double album, but fifth double album total.) recorded by American singer-songwriter Donna Summer. The album was recorded in 1981 and scheduled to be later that year but was shelved. It was not released until fifteen years later, on August 20, 1996, by Casablanca and Mercury Records. There was no promotion for the album. No singles or music videos were released. AllMusic gave the album a positive review, naming it her most personal record.

In 2021, Summer's estate released a remixed version of the album, subtitled "Recovered & Recoloured". The new edition is reduced to fifteen tracks (featuring ten songs, some appearing in multiple edits), with each song remixed by contemporary producers and remixers.

== Development ==
After making her name as the biggest selling and most important female artist of the disco era in the 1970s, Summer had signed to Geffen Records in 1980 and released the new wave-influenced album The Wanderer. I'm a Rainbow, a double album set, was set to be its follow-up (Summer had gained much success during the 1970s with double albums). Summer had recently given birth to her second child, daughter Brooklyn, when work was to start on the album. Things in the recording studio were not the same as before. Songwriter Harold Faltermeyer later recalled, "Donna had changed and was going through some things we couldn't help with. Things had changed and scheduled recording sessions were not kept. When Geffen stopped by the studio to check on progress, he was unhappy with what he had heard. There were only a few songs finished and most were in demo phase."

Geffen canceled the project and insisted that Summer part company with Giorgio Moroder and Pete Bellotte, who had produced and co-written it, and with whom Summer had been working since the early 1970s. She was instead paired up with producer Quincy Jones and began work on her 1982 self-titled album. This effectively ended Summer's working relationship with the Moroder/Bellotte team, with whom she had created ten critically acclaimed albums.

Faltermeyer was unaware that the project had been released in 1996 under the name I'm a Rainbow, saying in 2012, "The project was cancelled; I still have the tapes, we never completed the project. There was never any title."

== Release ==
Over the years, songs from I'm a Rainbow were released on other compilations:

- "Highway Runner" appeared on the soundtrack to Fast Times at Ridgemont High in 1982.
- "Romeo" appeared on the Flashdance soundtrack in 1983.
- The title track (written by Summer's husband, Bruce Sudano) and a remix of "Don't Cry for Me Argentina" (from Evita) appeared on the 1993 compilation album The Donna Summer Anthology.

While dance-oriented music was a theme throughout the album, this was combined with several different musical styles, making it one of Summer's more diverse albums. Styles explored included 80s British synthpop like The Human League and Duran Duran, pop/rock, and ballads. It included a duet with Joe "Bean" Esposito, writing credits from Harold Faltermeyer, Keith Forsey, Sylvester Levay, and Sudano as well as the usual Summer/Moroder/Bellotte team.

Bootleg copies of the album circulated among fans for years before the full album was finally released by PolyGram's Casablanca and Mercury Records labels on August 20, 1996. The original album artwork, however, could not be located, because the project was cancelled and there was no title or artwork made for the cancelled album. The tracks heard on the released album are mostly in demo phase, since the project was shelved, and Harold Faltermeyer insisted only a few tracks were actually finished. As of August 10, 2006, the album has sold 13,000 copies in the United States.

Critical reception for the album was largely positive. Leo Stanley wrote in AllMusic, "Summer turns in some of her most personal, introspective lyrics and singing, which gives the album an emotional force her albums sometimes lacked. In fact, given the quality of the music, it's hard to see why this was shelved at the time because it is stronger than the majority of her official studio albums."

In 2021, the album was re-edited and re-released with the subtitle "Recovered & Recoloured", including ten of the eighteen original tracks remixed by contemporary remixers and producers. The album opens with the title track, which includes a significantly different intro and the addition of a church organ, and closes with Leave Me Alone.

== Covers ==
Several of the shelved songs were licensed to other artists:

- The Real Thing released "I Believe in You" as a single in late 1981.
- Anni-Frid Lyngstad of ABBA recorded "To Turn the Stone", produced by Phil Collins, for her 1982 solo album Something's Going On. A music video was also filmed.
- "To Turn the Stone" was also included on Joe "Bean" Esposito and Giorgio Moroder's 1983 album Solitary Men.
- Pianist Helen St. John covered "To Turn the Stone" and "Melanie" (under a new title, "Images") on her 1982 album Power to the Piano, produced by Moroder.
- Amii Stewart recorded "You to Me" and "Sweet Emotion" for her self-titled album in 1983.

== Track listing ==
Original 1996 release
No.	Title	Writer(s)	Length
1.	"I Believe (In You)" (duet with Joe Esposito)	Harold Faltermeyer; Keith Forsey	4:31
2.	"True Love Survives"	Pete Bellotte; Donna Summer	3:38
3.	"You to Me"	Bellotte; Sylvester Levay	4:40
4.	"Sweet Emotion"	Bellotte; Levay	3:45
5.	"Leave Me Alone"	Faltermeyer; Forsey	4:06
6.	"Melanie"	Giorgio Moroder; Summer	3:40
7.	"Back Where You Belong"	Faltermeyer; Forsey	3:53
8.	"People Talk"	Moroder; Summer	4:16
9.	"To Turn the Stone"	Bellotte; Moroder	4:21
10.	"Brooklyn"	Bellotte; Levay; Summer	4:36
11.	"I'm a Rainbow"	Bruce Sudano	4:07
12.	"Walk On (Keep On Movin')"	Bellotte; Moroder	3:51
13.	"Don't Cry for Me Argentina"	Tim Rice; Andrew Lloyd Webber	4:29
14.	"A Runner with the Pack"	Bellotte	4:08
15.	"Highway Runner"	Moroder; Summer	3:29
16.	"Romeo"	Bellotte; Levay	3:19
17.	"End of the Week"	Bellotte; Levay	3:39
18.	"I Need Time"	Bellotte; Moroder; Summer	4:24

Recovered & Recoloured (LP version)
No.	Title	Length
1.	"I'm a Rainbow" (Junior's Shiny Rainbow edit)	4:16
2.	"I Believe (In You)" (Figo Sound version)	4:48
3.	"Back Where You Belong" (Jean Monique remix)	4:21
4.	"You to Me" (Oliver Nelson remix)	3:39
5.	"Don't Cry for Me Argentina" (Ladies on Mars "Buenos Aires" remix)	5:37
6.	"Sweet Emotion" (Le Flex remix)	3:46
7.	"Brooklyn" (Ladies on Mars "Child of Rhythm" remix)	4:44
8.	"Romeo" (Ladies on Mars "Luv-NRG" remix)	3:45
9.	"Highway Runner" (Ladies on Mars "Street Race" remix)	3:12
10.	"Leave Me Alone" (Ladies on Mars "Independence" remix)	4:16

Recovered & Recoloured (2LP/CD/digital version)
No.	Title	Length
11.	"Brooklyn" (Ladies on Mars "Child of Rhythm" remix – radio edit)	3:38
12.	"I Believe (In You)" (Figo Sound radio version)	3:01
13.	"Highway Runner" (Ladies on Mars "Street Race" extended remix)	6:18
14.	"Brooklyn" (Ladies on Mars "Child of Rhythm" extended remix)	6:54
15.	"Romeo" (Ladies on Mars "Luv-NRG" extended remix)	6:47
