= Heaven Help Me (Deon Estus song) =

1989 single by Deon Estus

Single by Deon Estus

from the album Spell
- Released: April 16, 1989
- Genre: Sophisti-pop
- Length: 4:40 (album version); 4:25 (single version)
- Label: Mika; Polydor
- Songwriters: Deon Estus; George Michael
- Producer: George Michael

Deon Estus singles chronology
| "Me or the Rumours" (1988) | "Heaven Help Me" (1989) | "Spell" (1989) |

"Heaven Help Me" is a song by American musician Deon Estus, released on April 16, 1989, as the second single from Estus' studio album, Spell (1988). Co-written with and produced by George Michael, the song features Michael on backing vocals.

== Track listings ==
- UK 12-inch single
1. "Heaven Help Me" (single version) – 4:25
2. "It's a Party" – 3:17
3. "Love Can't Wait" – 3:56
- UK CD maxi single
1. "Heaven Help Me" – 4:40
2. "It's a Party" – 3:17
3. "Love Can't Wait" – 3:56
4. "Me or the Rumours" (instrumental) – 5:50

== Charts ==
=== Weekly charts ===
Weekly chart performance for "Heaven Help Me"
| Chart (1989) | Peak position |
|---|---|
| Canada Top Singles (RPM) | 4 |
| Italy Airplay (Music & Media) | 14 |
| UK Singles (Official Charts) | 41 |
| US Adult Contemporary (Billboard) | 3 |
| US Billboard Hot 100 | 5 |
| US Hot R&B/Hip-Hop Songs (Billboard) | 3 |
