= All of You =

All of You may refer to:

== Music ==
- All of You (Ahmad Jamal album), 1961
- All of You (Colbie Caillat album) or the title song, 2011
- "All of You" (Betty Who song), 2015
- "All of You" (Cole Porter song), 1954
- "All of You" (Julio Iglesias and Diana Ross song), 1984
- "All of You" (Riize song), 2026
- "All of You", a song by Don Felder from the soundtrack to Heavy Metal, 1981
- "All of You", a song by Duran Duran from Future Past, 2021
- "All of You", a song by Journey South from Journey South, 2006
- "All of You", a song from the Encanto film soundtrack, 2021

== Film ==
- All of You (2017 film), a Filipino romantic comedy
- All of You (2024 film), a British science fiction romantic drama

== See also ==
- All of Me (disambiguation)
