= Time for Fantasy =

Time For Fantasy

Studio album by Amii Stewart
- Released: 1988
- Recorded: 1988
- Genre: Pop
- Length: 42:08
- Label: RCA Victor
- Producer: Greg Walsh

Amii Stewart chronology
Amii (1986)	Time For Fantasy (1988)	Pearls - Amii Stewart Sings Ennio Morricone (1990)

Professional ratings
Review scores
Source	Rating
Allmusic	2/5 stars

Time for Fantasy is a studio album by Amii Stewart released in 1988. One of the ballads, "I Still Believe," which had already become a major hit for pop singer Brenda K. Starr in 1987, was also covered by Mariah Carey some ten years later. The album has been re-released as Dusty Road, Heartache To Heartache, Run In The Night and It's Fantasy.

== Track listing ==
Side A

1. "Dusty Road" (Douglas Meakin, Mike Francis) - 4:33
2. "Heartache to Heartache" (Paul Bliss, Phil Palmer) - 3:36
3. "Sometimes a Stranger" (Richard Feldman, Gary Mallaber, Marcy Levy) - 3:51
4. "Stand" (Maurice White, Robin Smith, Franne Golde) - 4:26
5. "It's You and Me" (Adrienne Anderson, Giuseppe "Beppe" Cantarelli) - 3:55

Side B

1. "You Are in My System" (David Frank, Mic Murphy) - 4:15
2. "Window Shopping" (Sylvia Moy) - 4:17
3. "I Still Believe" (Antonina Armato, Cantarelli) - 3:53
4. "Run in the Night" (Amii Stewart, Charlie Cannon, Francis) - 4:02
5. "It's Fantasy" (Stewart, Franco Scepi, Sergio Menegale) - 4:16
6. "Dusty Road (reprise)" (Meakin, Francis) - 1:04

== Personnel ==
- Amii Stewart - lead vocals

=== "Dusty Road" ===
- Ray Russell - guitar, brass arrangements
- Jingles - Brazilian bass
- Robin Smith - acoustic piano
- Andy Duncan - percussion
- Philip Todd - saxophone, alto flute
- Pete Beachill - trombone
- Derek Watkins - trumpet, flugelhorn
- Guy Barker - trumpet, flugelhorn
- Amii Stewart, John Kirby - backing vocals

=== "Heartache to Heartache" ===
- Phil Palmer - guitar
- Robin Smith - acoustic piano, brass arrangements
- Andy Duncan - percussion
- Philip Todd - saxophone
- Neil Sidwell - trombone
- Guy Barker - trumpet
- John Barclay - trumpet
- John Kirby - backing vocals

=== "Sometimes a Stranger" ===
- Ray Russell - guitar
- Philip Todd - EWI solo
- Frank Ricotti - percussion
- Royal Philharmonic Orchestra - orchestra
- David Cullen - string arrangements
- John Kirby - backing vocals

=== "Stand" ===
- Aziz Ibrahim - guitar
- Robin Smith - keyboards, brass arrangements
- Philip Todd - saxophone
- Neil Sidwell - trombone
- Guy Barker - trumpet
- John Barclay - trumpet
- Andy Duncan - percussion
- John Kirby - backing vocals

=== "It's You and Me" ===
- Ray Russell - guitar
- Robin Smith - electric piano
- Frank Ricotti - percussion
- Philip Todd - saxophone solo
- Royal Philharmonic Orchestra - orchestra
- David Cullen - string arrangements
- John Kirby - backing vocals

=== "You Are in My System ===
- Robin Smith - keyboards
- Andy Duncan - percussion
- Royal Philharmonic Orchestra - orchestra
- David Cullen - string arrangements
- John Kirby - backing vocals

=== "Window Shopping" ===
- Ray Russell - brass arrangements
- Philip Todd - saxophone
- Pete Beachill - trombone
- Guy Barker - trumpet
- Stuart Brooks - trumpet
- Amii Stewart - backing vocals

=== "I Still Believe" ===
- Ray Russell - guitar
- Robin Smith - keyboards
- Andy Duncan - percussion
- Frank Ricotti - percussion
- Royal Philharmonic Orchestra - orchestra
- David Cullen - string arrangements

=== "Run in the Night" ===
- Aziz Ibrahim - guitar
- Phil Palmer - guitar solo
- Andy Duncan - percussion
- Amii Stewart, John Kirby - backing vocals

=== "It's Fantasy" ===
- Ronnie Trice - piano
- Philip Todd - electric saxophone

== Production ==
- Greg Walsh - producer
