= The Hits (Amii Stewart album) =

Remix album by Amii Stewart
- Released: December 1985
- Recorded: 1978–1985
- Genre: R&B; pop; disco; hi-NRG
- Label: Sedition; Hansa (1986)

Amii Stewart chronology
Try Love (1984)	The Hits (1985)	Amii (1986)

The Hits is a remix album of recordings by Amii Stewart released in the United Kingdom in 1985. A double A-side single with the remixed versions of "Knock on Wood" and "Light My Fire" reached #7 on the UK charts, followed by a re-issue of "You Really Touched My Heart" (#89). Stewart also re-recorded her 1981 duet "My Guy"/"My Girl" with American bassist and singer Deon Estus.

The album and the remixes included have since been re-issued on a large number of mid-price compilations.

== Track listing ==
- Side A
1. "Knock on Wood" (1985 remix, edited version) – 4:10
2. "You Really Touched My Heart" (1985 remix, edit) – 4:15
3. "137 Disco Heaven" (1985 remix) – 2:46
4. "Paradise Bird" (1985 remix) – 5:18
5. "My Guy"/"My Girl" (1985 version, duet with Deon Estus) – 4:33
- Side B
1. "Light My Fire" (1985 remix, edited version) – 3:56
2. "Only a Child in Your Eyes" (1985 remix) – 3:02
3. "Step Into the Love Line" (1985 remix) – 4:00
4. "Ash 48" (dub version of "Knock on Wood") (1985 remix) – 2:12
5. "Jealousy" (1985 remix) – 5:53

== Personnel ==
- Amii Stewart – vocals
- Barry Leng – backing vocals, guitar
- Charles Augins – backing vocals
- Gerry Morris – backing vocals
- Jimmy Chambers – backing vocals
- Tony Jackson – backing vocals
- Gerry Morris – bass guitar
- Adrian Shepard – drums
- Alan Murphy – guitar
- Ian Hughes – keyboards
- Ken Freeman – keyboards
- Pete Amesen – keyboards
- Simon May – keyboards
- Glyn Thomas – percussion

=== Production ===
- Barry Leng – original production / production

=== Remix ===
- Barry Leng (side A: 1–5 / side B: 1–4)
- Alan Coulthard (side A: 1 / side B: 1)
- Dave Hewson (side A: 3 / side B: 4)
- Sanny X (side B: 5)
