= Amii =

Studio album by Amii Stewart
- Released: 1986
- Recorded: 1986
- Genre: R&B, Dance-pop, Disco
- Length: 42:46
- Label: Sherman Records / RCA Italy
- Producer: Giorgio Moroder (Tracks A1-A5); Bolland & Bolland (Tracks B1-B5)

Amii Stewart chronology
The Hits (1985)	Amii (1986)	Time for Fantasy (1988)

Professional ratings
Review scores
Source	Rating
Allmusic	4/5 stars

Amii is a studio album by Amii Stewart released in 1986 which includes singles "Love Ain't No Toy" (originally recorded by Yvonne Fair) and "Time Is Tight". The album was produced by Giorgio Moroder and Dutch brothers Bolland & Bolland for Teldec Germany and RCA Italy.

== Track listing ==
Side A

1. "Time is Tight" (Giorgio Moroder, Keith Forsey) (4:13)
2. "Power Play" (Moroder, Forsey) (3:49)
3. "Easy on Your Love" (Moroder, Tom Whitlock) (3:27)
4. "Love's in Disguise" (Moroder, Forsey) (3:35)
5. "Lover to Lover" (Giuseppe "Beppe" Cantarelli, Roy Freeland) (4:16)

Side B

1. "Break These Chains" (Bolland & Bolland) (4:35)
2. "Love Ain't No Toy" (Norman Whitfield) (4:59)
3. "The Mystery of Love" (Bolland & Bolland) (5:15)
4. "Conspiracy" (Bolland & Bolland) (3:59)
5. "This Generation" (Bolland & Bolland) (4:38)

== Personnel ==
- Amii Stewart - lead vocals

=== Tracks A1-A5 ===
- Richie Zito- guitar, keyboards
- Arthur Barrow- keyboards, bass
- Beth Anderson, Gary Falcone, Joe Pizzulo- backing vocals
- Terry Wilson- guitar (Track A5)

=== Tracks B1-B5 ===
==== Musicians ====
- Lex Bolderdijk
- Ferdi Bolland
- Rob Bolland
- Jan Hollestelle
- Ton Op 'T Hof
- Gerbrand Westveen
- Louis Van Dijk
- Okkie Huysdens

==== Backing Vocals ====
- Amii Stewart
- Ferdi Bolland
- Rob Bolland
- Lisa Boray
- Sue Chaloner

== Production ==
- Giorgio Moroder - producer (Tracks A1-A5)
- Ferdi Bolland - producer (Tracks B1-B5)
- Rob Bolland - producer (Tracks B1-B5)
