= Giorgia Fumanti =

- Fumanti in January 2008 in Vancouver, British Columbia, Canada.

Background information
- Born: February 22, 1975 (age 51); Fivizzano, Italy
- Genres: Crossover, operatic pop
- Occupation: Soprano singer
- Years active: 2004–present
- Label: EMI - ISBA Music / Universal
- Website: giorgiafumanti.com

Giorgia Fumanti (born February 22, 1975) is an Italian soprano singer of operatic pop and crossover music based in Montreal, Canada since 2002. She is also a composer, producer and arranger. Her debut EMI album From My Heart reached the top 20 on the Billboard Crossover Chart. By 2010 she had sold over 1.2 million copies of her albums.

== Life and career ==
Fumanti was born in the village of Fivizzano in Tuscany, and raised in the nearby small city of Aulla and in Monterosso al Mare. She studied voice at the Conservatorio di Musica Arrigo Boito in Parma and relocated to Montréal, Canada in 2002 where she continued her vocal training. In 2004, her first album, entitled Like a Dream was released on Canadian independent label Isba Music Entertainment. The album featured her take on the music of Vangelis. She signed her first international recording contract with EMI and released her album From My Heart under that label in 2007. It featured her versions of Sting's Fields of Gold (Campi d’Oro), and four Ennio Morricone pieces including themes from The Mission, Cinema Paradiso and Once Upon a Time in the West. The album reached the Billboard's Top 20 Crossover and peaked to No. 1 in Japan and South Africa.

In January 2007, Fumanti made her U.S. TV debut, singing the Canadian National Anthem for the NHL All-Stars Game in Dallas, Texas. In March of that year, she performed on the PBS Concert Special Heavenly Voices along with Sasha & Shawna, the Tim Janis Ensemble, and English countertenor Ryland Angel. She subsequently toured the United States with the Heavenly Voices performers.

She had toured Southeast Asia in the winter of 2006/2007 with José Carreras, including performances in Korea, Hong Kong, and Taiwan (for a New Year's Eve Concert). In June 2007 she performed again with Carreras at the Hampton Court Palace Festival, along with the Royal Philharmonic Orchestra. Fumanti also recorded a Christmas Concert with Canadian tenor John McDermott at the Rose Theater in Brampton, Ontario, on June 26, 2007 for broadcast in November and December of that year.

Fumanti's later concerts and live performances have included venues in Asia, Europe, and North America. She sang the Shanghai Expo theme song "Better City, Better Life" with Chinese baritone Liao Changyong when it was presented for the first time on national TV on May 1, 2009 and performed on Dragon TV for the 200 Day Countdown for the Expo in October 2009. In 2013 she sang at the Kremlin Palace in Moscow and made her ninth concert appearance at the Théâtre Maisonneuve in Montréal. The Travel of Sound, Fumanti's 2017 China tour, took her to multiple venues in that country, including the Guangzhou Opera House. In 2019 she presented her twelfth studio album, Aimons-nous, in concerts at the Auberge Saint-Gabriel in Montreal and the Manoir Saint-Sauveur in the Laurentides region of Quebec. The album, which Fumanti describes as an homage to her adopted country, is a selection of French and Québécois popular songs.

== Discography ==
Like a Dream CD

- Release date: 2004
- Label: Isba Music Entertainment/The Orchard
- UPC: 829410412964

From My Heart CD

- Release date: March 6, 2007 in North America and December 29, 2006 in Asia
- Label: Manhattan Records / EMI
- ISBN

Heavenly Voices DVD

- Release date: March 6, 2007
- Co-performers: Ryland Angel, Giorgia Fumanti, Sasha & Shawna
- Label: Manhattan Records / EMI
- ISBN

Je Suis CD

- Release date: November 18, 2008
- Label : Isba Music Entertainment / Universal Music Canada
- UPC: 619061371921

Peace of Heaven CD

- Release date: Jul 3, 2009
- Label : Fortissimo
- UPC: FOR77228

Magnificat CD

- Release date: November 17, 2009
- Label: Isba Music Entertainment / Universal Music Canada
- ASIN: B002SXPKD4

Elysium CD

- Release date: May 10, 2011
- Label: Universal Music Canada
- ASIN: B004VB477Q

Collection CD

- Release date: September 18, 2012
- Label: VEGA2 / Select
- UPC: 7 79913 43392 1

Corazón Latino CD

- Release date: November 11, 2013
- Label: VEGA2

A Christmas Pray'r Single (duet with Micheal Castaldo)

- Release date: December 2014

Essence CD

- Release date: September 4, 2015
- Label: VEGA2 / Select

Noel En Lumiere CD

- Release Date: November 6, 2015
- Label: VEGA2 / Select

Amour CD

- Release Date: April 20, 2018
- Label: VEGA2 / Select

Aimons-Nous CD

- Release Date: May 3, 2019
- Label: VEGA2 / Select

Cinema II CD

- Release Date: October 24, 2025
- Label: SoNo Recording Group
