= Romina Arena =

Italian singer-songwriter

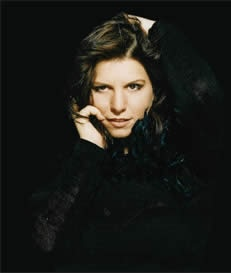
- Arena in 2006

Background information
- Origin: Palermo, Sicily, Italy
- Genres: Pop; popera; classical crossover
- Occupations: Singer; composer; writer
- Years active: 1984–present
- Labels: Design House/Toshiba-EMI; CP Productions/; PC Music; Outback Records; NMG Records; Perseverance Records; Lakeshore Records
- Website: www.rominaarena.com

Romina Arena (born 1980) is an Italian American singer-songwriter of the Operatic Pop genre. Arena has released over 20 studio albums, including her 2012 project Morricone.Uncovered, which features vocal and lyrical adaptations of film scores composed by Ennio Morricone. As a teenager, Arena recorded an album in collaboration with Pope John Paul II, Fateci Santi, which was produced by Beppe Cantarelli for a Vatican Compilation project.

Arena has performed with Italian artists such as Pavarotti and Andrea Bocelli, and pop artists including Lionel Richie, Brian Wilson, Mario Frangoulis, Alessandro Safina, Al Martino, and Eliot Sloan (the lead singer of Blessid Union of Souls).

== Early life ==
Arena began performing at the age of four in the Italian edition of Disney's Mickey Mouse Club, where she was part of the touring and TV entertainment show known as Topolino. Romina toured Europe performing and learning the languages of her European neighbors. At age seven, she performed as a classical ballerina in major Italian theatres. At age fifteen, Arena was reportedly attacked and severely injured backstage during a TV show; she sustained a major vocal cord injury.

== Career ==
In 2001, Arena recorded a cover of the Japanese song "Subaru" originally by Shinji Tanimura. Her rock opera single "Satellite (Italian Version)" was included in the soundtrack for the video game Project Gotham Racing 2 (2003). Arena received the "Olympus of the Arts Award" in June 2010; she performed to a sold-out crowd for the Arts Olympus Gala aboard the Queen Mary in Long Beach, California. The award was presented alongside Arena to Jane Russell, Linda Grey, and Edward Begley Jr., for their contribution to humanity and work in the arts and music in the world. In July 2010, Arena received the “Goddess Artemis Award” from EAWC (Euro American Women’s Council) in Greece. In September 2010, Arena received the "Premio Globo Tricolore", one of the highest award honors in Italy representing excellence and humanitarian efforts. In November 2010, Arena performed an in-game concert within the virtual world Second Life. In November 2010, Arena won the “CSNA Award” for Best Female Artist in North America from the Confederation of Sicilians of North America. In September 2012, Arena released Morricone.Uncovered, an album collaboration consisting of 15 film scores by Ennio Morricone with Arena's lyrics and vocals. Romina Arena wrote original lyrics in English, Italian, Spanish and French to these themes. She performs the songs and is accompanied by the Dohnányi Orchestra Budafok. Recordings have taken place in Budapest (Hungary), San Gemini and Siracusa (Italy), Santa Monica and Sherman Oaks (California, USA) and in Quebec (Canada). She has also received a RAI International Lifetime Achievement Gold Record "from Italy for her contributions to the music industry in Europe."

In January 2012, in Syracuse, Italy she received the “Premio Sicilia Award” for “most famous Sicilian artist in the world.” In 2013, she contributed a cover of "I Want Love" (originally from Silent Hill 3, composed by Akira Yamaoka) to Edgar Rothermich's album, The Best of Silent Hill (Music from the Video Game Series), released by Perseverance Records. Arena signed with Lakeshore Records in 2015 for the studio album Where Did They Film That? In Italy. This was followed by the June 2016 release of the album Music Journey, which accompanied her travel guide book of the same name. That same year, her song "Every Day Is Christmas Day" was featured in the Hallmark Channel film A Christmas to Remember. She appeared as a guest performer in Jim Wilson and Friends: A Place in My Heart at the Globe-News Center for the Performing Arts in Amarillo, Texas. She also starred in and co-produced the ABC television special Holiday Movie Skating Spectacular, hosted by Kristi Yamaguchi, Brian Boitano, and Kimmie Meissner. In 2020, Arena received the "Filming Italy Variety Spotlight Award" in Los Angeles. In 2021, Arena was appointed "Official Ambassador of Italian Excellence in the World" by the President of M.I.R.E. (Movement of Italian Residents Abroad). The following year, she was awarded the "Patrimonio Italiano Award" at the Chamber of Deputies of the Italian Republic for her work as an artist and producer.

== Discography ==
=== Albums ===
- 1994: As Beautiful as You – CP Productions/BMG (Germany/Australia)
- 2004: Romina Arena – American Entertainment Records
- 2006: You're Gonna Hear from Me – Outback Records
- 2009: A Joyful Christmas – NMG Records
- 2010: Romanza (The Love Collection) – NMG Records (Re-released 2013)
- 2011: Life – NMG Records
- 2012: Morricone Uncovered – Perseverance Records
- 2013: Romina Sings Japanese – NMG Records
- 2015: A Mother's Heart – PoperaStar Records
- 2016: Where Did They Film That Italy – The Music Journey – Lakeshore Records
- 2019: A Beautiful Surprise – PoperaStar Records
- 2020: Atica, Vol. 1 – PoperaStar Records
- 2021: Amore y Amor – PoperaStar Records

=== Singles ===
- 1994: "Una Vita Senza Vita" – San Remo Nuovi Talenti Festival Compilation (as Romina Notarbartolo)
- 1994: "You're The Only One" – Peter Ciani Music
- 1994: "Smile" – Danilo Sulis Recordings
- 1998: "Fateci Santi" – Produced by Beppe Cantarelli for The Vatican compilation
- 2001: "Subaru" – Design House/Toshiba-EMI
- 2003: "Satellite" – Featured on Project Gotham Racing 2 soundtrack, Microsoft Game Studios
- 2006: "Cuerpo Sin Alma" – Outback Records
- 2008: "Believe" – NMG Records
- 2010: "How Do You Keep the Music Playing?" – NMG/Macs Records
- 2011: "A Mother's Prayer" – NMG Records
- 2011: "Arthur's Theme (The Best That You Can Do)" – NMG Records
- 2012: "Un Sogno Che Sognai" (I Dreamed a Dream) – Perseverance Records
- 2013: "I Want Love" – Featured on The Best of Silent Hill compilation, Perseverance Records
- 2014: "Corazon Italiano" – NMG Records
- 2014: "Annie's Song" – PoperaStar Records
- 2020: "Holding You" – PoperaStar Records
- 2020: "Verte Amor" – PoperaStar Records

== Books ==
- Arena, Romina (2016). Where Did They Film That? Italy (Travel guide). Fresno, CA: Linden/Quill Driver Books. ISBN 9781610351829. OCLC 931295588.

== Articles and interviews ==
- Top 40 Charts "Morricone.Uncovered" By Romina Arena And Ennio Morricone To Be Released Today!
- Malibu Times "A Long Road Realized with Romina Arena"
- Interview with Romina Arena and Build-A-Bear CEO Sharon Price John, ForbesBooks Podcast
- "L’ Artista Romina Arena in CalabriaEstate 2023," Paesi Uniti della Sabina (in Italian)
- "Romina Arena," 2024 review by Limitless (in Italian)
- Review: Romina Arena, Morricone Uncovered 2012
- Podcast: Little Italy of LA Podcast Romina Arena interviewed by Deborah Kobylt
