= Amii Stewart (album) =

Studio album by Amii Stewart
- Released: 1983
- Recorded: 1983
- Genre: R&B, Dance-pop, Disco
- Label: RCA Victor
- Producer: Simon Boswell

Amii Stewart chronology
I'm Gonna Get Your Love (1982)	Amii Stewart (1983)	Try Love (1984)

Professional ratings
Review scores
Source	Rating
Allmusic	4/5 stars

Amii Stewart is a studio album by Amii Stewart released in 1983 which includes hit single "Working Late Tonight" as well as covers of two songs from Donna Summer's unreleased 1981 album I'm a Rainbow. In 2015, Funky Town Grooves announced they would be reissuing the album on CD for the first time ever.

== Covers ==
Turkish singer Ajda Pekkan covered "Working Late Tonight" in Turkish the same year as "Uykusuz her gece" ("Sleepless Every Night") on her album Süperstar 83. Finnish singer Lea Laven covered "Working Late Tonight" in Finnish the same year as "Mä myöhään töitä teen" on her album "Lahjan sain"

== Track listing ==
Side A:

1. "Working Late Tonight" (Mario Capuano, Simon Boswell)- 4:04
2. "Nobody but Me" (Leslie Mándoki) - 3:30
3. "Sweet Emotion" (Pete Bellotte, Sylvester Levay) - 3:47
  - Originally recorded by Donna Summer for her unreleased I'm a Rainbow album (1981, released 1996).
4. "Don't Ask Me Why" (Leslie Mándoki) - 3:35
5. "Take a Heart" (Miki Dallon) - 3:28

Side B:

1. "Beginning of the End" (Gerard McMahon, Tom Bahlen) - 3:56
2. "You to Me" (Pete Bellotte, Sylvester Levay) - 4:41
  - Originally recorded by Donna Summer for her unreleased I'm a Rainbow album (1981, released 1996).
3. "Say Goodbye to Love" (Simon Boswell) - 4:02
4. "Once Again" (Vili Lakatos) - 3:43

== Personnel ==
- Amii Stewart - lead vocals, backing vocals
- Corrado Rustici - guitar
- Simon Boswell - guitar, synthesizer
- Vili Lakatos - piano, synthesizer
- Stefano Senesi - synthesizer
- Aldo Banfi - Synclavier
- Dario Massari - Fairlight programming
- Jeremy Meek - bass
- James Lane - drums
- Mel Collins - saxophone
- Charles Cannon, Douglas Meakin, Simona Pirone - backing vocals
- Leandro Leandri, Raffaele Cricchi, Sandro Secondino, Vincent Messina - fingersnaps on "Take a Heart"

=== Production ===
- Simon Boswell - Producer, Arranger, Mixing
- Leandro Leandri - Engineer, Mixing
- Raffaele Chicchi, Sandro Secondino - Assistant Engineers
- Guido Di Toma - Mastering (half-speed)
