= Spell (album) =

Studio album by Deon Estus
- Released: August 1, 1988
- Studios: Maison Rouge, Mayfair Studios, Eel Pie Studios and Eden Studios (London, UK); Metro Studios (Minneapolis, Minnesota, USA); Sigma Sound Studios (New York City, New York, USA); Image Recording Studios (Los Angeles, California, USA)
- Genres: Pop rock; R&B
- Length: 41:03
- Labels: Mika; PolyGram
- Producers: Colin Campsie; George McFarlane; John "Jellybean" Benitez; Chris Porter; Deon Estus; David Z; George Michael

Singles from Faith
- 1. "Me or the Rumours" Released: July 3, 1988; 2. "Heaven Help Me" Released: April 16, 1989; 3. "Spell" Released: 1989

Professional ratings
Review scores
Source	Rating
AllMusic	2/5 stars

Spell is the only studio album by American musician and singer Deon Estus, released on August 1, 1988, by Mika Records.

The album contains the hit single "Heaven Help Me", which featured background vocals by Michael, and reached number 5 on the US Billboard Hot 100 chart in 1989.

== Track listing ==
All tracks are written by Deon Estus, except where noted.

Side one
No.	Title	Writer(s)	Length
1.	"Me or the Rumours" (The Jellybean mix)	Estus; Kenny Young	4:05
2.	"Spell"		4:38
3.	"Love Me Over"		4:08
4.	"You're the Only One for Me"	Kevin Calhoun; Matt Noble	4:11
5.	"False Start"		4:05

Side two
No.	Title	Writer(s)	Length
6.	"Heaven Help Me"	Estus; George Michael	4:40
7.	"Blue Envelope"	Estus; Young	3:38
8.	"Love Can't Wait"		3:56
9.	"Solid Ground"	Estus; Simon Climie	4:16
10.	"Me or the Rumours" (The George Michael mix)	Estus; Young	3:42
Total length:			41:03

== Personnel ==
- Deon Estus – vocals, backing vocals, keyboards (2, 5, 8), bass (5, 6, 8, 9), arrangements (9)
- Richard Cottle – keyboards (1, 7, 10)
- George McFarlane – keyboards (1, 5, 7, 8, 10), drum samples (5, 8)
- Nick Glennie-Smith – keyboards (2, 5, 8), strings (2)
- Lyndon Connah – keyboards (3)
- Matt Noble – keyboards (4), guitar (4), arrangements (4)
- Danny Schogger – keyboards (6)
- Ricky Peterson – keyboards (9), drums (9)
- Jim Williams – guitar (1, 10)
- Hugh Burns – guitar (2, 6)
- Kevin Calhoun – guitar (4), arrangements (4)
- Phil Palmer – guitar (7)
- Levi Seacer Jr. – guitar (9)
- Andy Duncan – drum samples (1, 5–8, 10), percussion (1, 7, 10), drum programming (2), drums (3)
- Jimmy Copley – hi-hats (1, 7, 10)
- Trevor Murrell – drum and hi-hat overdubs (2)
- David Z – drums (4, 9), arrangements (4, 9)
- Steve Sidwell – trumpet (2, 6)
- Paul Spong – trumpet (2, 6)
- Rick Taylor – trombone (2)
- Simon Climie – arrangements (9)
- Colin Campsie – backing vocals (1, 7)
- George Michael – backing vocals (6)
- Ginger Commodore – backing vocals (9)
- Javetta Steele – backing vocals (9)
- J.D. Steele – backing vocals (9)
- Jearlyn Steele – backing vocals (9)

== Production ==
- John "Jellybean" Benitez – producer (1)
- Colin Campsie – producer (1, 5, 7, 8, 10)
- George McFarlane – producer (1, 5, 7, 8, 10)
- Deon Estus – producer (2)
- Chris Porter – producer (2, 3)
- David Z – producer (4, 9)
- George Michael – producer (6)
- Stylorouge – design
- Mike Prior – photography

Technical

- Chris Porter – engineer (1, 3, 6, 7), mixing (5, 7, 8)
- John "Jellybean" Benitez – remixing (1)
- Chris Ludwinski – engineer (2)
- Alan Meyerson – remixing (3)
- David Z – engineer (4, 9), mixing (4, 9)
- Bill Gill – engineer (5, 8)
- Simon Sullivan – engineer (10)
- George Michael – remixing (10)
- John Palmer – assistant engineer (1, 6, 7), mix assistant (5, 7, 8)
- Ron DaSilva – remix assistant (3)
- Tommy Tucker Jr. – assistant engineer (4, 9)
- Irene Kelly – assistant engineer (5, 8)
- Kevin White – assistant engineer (10)

== Charts ==
Weekly chart performance for Spell
Chart (1989)	Peak position
US Billboard 200	89
US Top R&B/Hip-Hop Albums (Billboard)	44
