= Together (Amii Stewart and Mike Francis song) =

1985 song by Amii Stewart and Mike Francis

Single by Amii Stewart and Mike Francis

from the album Features / The Best of Amii Stewart
- B-side: "Do It All Again"
- Released: 1985
- Genre: Italo disco
- Length: 6:39
- Label: RCA
- Songwriter(s): Amii Stewart, Mike Francis
- Producer(s): Paul Micioni

Amii Stewart singles chronology
"Fever Line" (1985)	"Together" (1985)	"Knock on Wood / Light My Fire (Remix)" (1985)

Mike Francis singles chronology
"Features of Love" (1985)	"Together" (1985)	"Iron It Out/You Can't Get Out of My Heart" (1986)

"Together" is a song by American singer Amii Stewart and Italian musician Mike Francis, released as a single in 1985. The duet was a number nine hit in Italy in July 1985. It appeared on Francis' 1985 album Features, and Stewart's 1985 compilation album The Best of Amii Stewart.
