= Gilda Buttà =

Italian pianist

Gilda Buttà (born July 29, 1959, in Patti, Sicily) is an Italian pianist.

After studying piano at "Giuseppe Verdi" Conservatory in Milan, she won the Franz Liszt Prize in 1976, and started a concert pianist career. She has recorded several film soundtracks, most notably that written by Academy Award-winning composer Ennio Morricone for Giuseppe Tornatore's film The Legend of 1900.

She was briefly married to French jazz pianist Michel Petrucciani.
