= Magic (Amii Stewart album) =

Studio album by Amii Stewart
- Released: 1992
- Recorded: 1992
- Genre: R&B, Pop music
- Label: RTI Italy

Amii Stewart chronology
Pearls - Amii Stewart Sings Ennio Morricone (1990)	Magic (1992)	Lady To Ladies (1994)

Professional ratings
Review scores
Source	Rating
Allmusic	3/5 stars

Magic is a studio album by Amii Stewart released in 1992. The album which includes singles "Don't Be So Shy" and "Don't Stop" was a collaboration with Narada Michael Walden and British songwriting duo Climie Fisher.

== Track listing ==
1. "Don't Be So Shy" (Dakota, Walden, Walden) - 4:55
2. "Stay With Me" (Humes) - 5:36
3. "I Can't Give Up" (Booth, Romani, Stewart) - 5:19
4. "Now That We're Here" (Giscombe, Glass, Taylor) - 4:46
5. "Fly on the Wall" (Biddu, Stirling) - 4:30
6. "There Has Got to Be a Way" (Climie, Fisher, Morgan) - 4:55
7. "A Better Day" (Britti, Stewart) - 5:25
8. "Don't Stop" (Giscombe, Glass, Taylor) - 4:35
9. "Like a Stone" (Neri, Stewart) - 4:18
10. "Song for Daddy" (Puccioni, Stewart) - 4:21
11. "Warm Embrace" (Nava, Stewart) - 3:57
12. "Le Storie Lunghe" (Nava) - 4:01

== Personnel ==
- Amii Stewart - Lead vocals, Backing vocals, Backing vocal arrangement
- Marco Rinalduzzi, Paolo Gianolio - Guitars
- Danilo Rea, Luca Orioli, Mario Puccioni, Vittorio Cosma - Piano
- Davide Romani - Bass, Programming, Computer, Backing vocal arrangement
- Lele Melotti - Drums
- Luca Cerosimo - Computer, Sampling, Editing
- Michael Rosen - Alto and Soprano saxophone
- Miguel Brown, Orlando Johnson, Patrick Booth, Paul Fredericks, Shirley Fredericks, William Lessenberry - Backing vocals

== Production ==
- Amii Stewart - producer
- Davide Romani - producer
- Narada Michael Walden - producer
