= All of Me (2013 film) =

2014 film

- Directed by: Alexandra Lescaze
- Written by: Alexandra Lescaze
- Produced by: Alexandra Lescaze
- Cinematography: Deborah Eve Lewis
- Edited by: Sarah Devorkin
- Music by: Greg Talenfeld
- Production company: Mighty Fine Films
- Distributed by: Public Broadcasting Service
- Release date: June 15, 2013
- Running time: 54 minutes
- Country: United States
- Language: English
- Budget: $300,000 (estimated)

All of Me is a 2013 American documentary film, that follows a group of obese women friends who decide to have adjustable gastric band or gastric bypass weight loss surgery.

All of Me is directed and produced by Alexandra Lescaze. Deborah Eve Lewis is co-producer and director of photography. The film was shot in Austin, TX.

All of Me premiered at the Los Angeles Film Festival in June 2013. The broadcast version of the film premiered on PBS's Independent Lens on March 24, 2014.

== Synopsis ==
The “girls,” as they call themselves, have been friends for years, having met through the Size Acceptance movement and the BBW community. They've unsuccessfully tried every diet and pill in an effort to lose weight. Getting older and facing more health and mobility challenges, they choose gastric band or gastric bypass surgery as a last resort.

The girls take viewers through their struggles before and after surgery, including a host of issues and consequences; some they expected, some they feared, and some they never could have imagined. They have varied post-op experiences, but one reality is true for all of them—the surgery means the loss of their primary coping strategy (eating). And trying to shed hundreds of pounds changes everything in their lives—their health, their self-images, their marriages, and even their friendships.

== Critical reviews ==
The Wall Street Journal said "This coolly penetrating film honors women who address the reality of their lives with ferocious eloquence… Outstandingly potent."

All of Me was reviewed in The New York Times. It was also reviewed in The New York Post, among other places.

== Awards ==
All of Me won an Audience Award at the 2013 Austin Film Festival.
