= Images (Amii Stewart album) =

Studio album by Amii Stewart
- Released: April 1981
- Recorded: 1980, 1981
- Genre: R&B, dance-pop, disco
- Length: 37:50
- Label: Hansa, Ariola
- Producer: Narada Michael Walden, Barry Leng, Simon May

Amii Stewart chronology
Paradise Bird (1979)	Images (1981)	I'm Gonna Get Your Love (1981)

Images is a studio album by Amii Stewart released in April 1981. The album yielded three European single releases, "My Guy/My Girl" (a duet with Johnny Bristol) (#39 UK), "Where Did Our Love Go", and "Great Balls Of Fire" and had been followed by single "Rocky Woman" which was also included on the Mexican edition. Images was released as I'm Gonna Get Your Love in the U.S., with a slightly altered track listing.

In 1985 Stewart recorded a new version of duet "My Guy/My Girl" with Deon Estus that was issued as a single in the UK (#63).

The original Images album in its entirety remains unreleased on compact disc.

== Track listing ==
Side A:

1. "Where Did Our Love Go" (Holland-Dozier-Holland) – 4:25
2. "Great Balls of Fire" (Jack Hammer, Otis Blackwell) – 4:11
3. "Save This Night for Love" (Ellison Chase, William Haberman, Arthur Jacobson) – 3:30
4. "Digital Love" (Randy Jackson, Narada Michael Walden, Allee Willis) – 3:49
5. "Love Is Bad for Your Health" (Gary Sulsh, Stuart Leatherwood) – 3:50

Side B:

1. "Why'd You Have to Be So Sexy" (Len Boone, Larry LaFalce) – 3:25
2. "Tonight" (Eddie Schwartz) – 3:19
3. "Premiere" (Barry Leng, Simon May) – 3:32
4. "Don't Let Go of Me" (Randy Edelman) – 3:50
5. "My Guy" / "My Girl" (Duet With Johnny Bristol) (Smokey Robinson, Ronald White) – 3:59

== Personnel ==
- Amii Stewart – vocals
- Johnny Bristol – vocals on "My Guy"/"My Girl".

== Production ==
- Barry Leng – producer
- Simon May – producer
- Narada Michael Walden – producer

== Alternative album editions ==
- Mexico, additional track "Rocky Woman" (B1).
- USA: I'm Gonna Get Your Love.

== Charts ==
Chart performance for Images
Chart (1981)	Peak position
Swedish Albums (Sverigetopplistan)	49
