= Mike Francis =

Italian singer & composer (1961–2009)

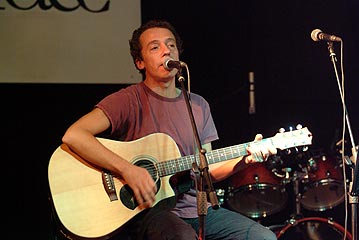
- Francis performing at The Place in Rome, Italy, 2006

Background information
- Born: Michele Francesco Puccioni; 26 April 1961; Florence, Italy
- Died: 30 January 2009 (aged 47) Rome, Italy
- Genres: Smooth jazz; jazz fusion; blue-eyed soul; chill-out; Italo disco (1980s work)
- Years active: 1982–2009
- Labels: RCA

Francesco Puccioni (26 April 1961 – 30 January 2009), better known under his stage name Mike Francis, was an Italian singer and composer, born in Florence, Italy. Internationally, he was best known for his 1984 hit, "Survivor", and his collaborations with American singer Amii Stewart.

== Career ==
Puccioni formed his first band at age 14 with schoolmates from l'Istituto di Studi Americano in Rome. Under the stage name Mike Francis, he had his first hit with "Survivor" in 1984 and went on to record ten studio albums. Among his best known works is the song "Friends", a collaboration with Amii Stewart released in 1984 which became a hit in the UK.

Beginning in 2000, assisted by his brother Mario (Mari-One) and by the Maltese multi-instrumentalist Aidan Zammit, he founded the group Mystic Diversions. The group's songs were featured on many high-profile chill-out and lounge compilations. In addition to new, original song material, they also performed covers of various 1970s and 1980s songs such as "Float On" (by the Floaters) and "A Warm Summer Night" (by Chic). Together with the trio, additional musicians for live sets consisted of Agostino Marangolo (drums), Fabio Pignatelli (bass), Marco Rinalduzzi (guitars), Giovanni Imparato (percussion and vocals), as well as Wendy Lewis and Laura Serra (backing vocals).

Francis' 2007 album Inspired contains several covers such as "Summer Breeze" (Seals & Crofts), "Time" (Culture Club), "Thinking of You" (Sister Sledge) and "Nothing Can Come Between Us" (Sade), as well as collaborations with Blank & Jones on "Roots", "I Love You", the Van Morrison cover "Someone Like You" and the Labi Siffre cover "Down". "Someone Like You" appears on the compilation album Café del Mar Vol. 12. Francis' website states him as saying: "From that moment many other songs were born[;] in a simple and spontaneous way, simply "inspired"..."

== Death ==
Puccioni died aged 47 on 30 January 2009 of lung cancer in Rome. His last compilation album The Very Best of Mike Francis (All Was Missing) was released just days before his death.

== Discography ==
=== Albums ===
- 1984 – Let's Not Talk About It
- 1985 – Features
- 1986 – Mike Francis
- 1987 – Songs (compilation)
- 1988 – Flashes of Life
- 1989 – Features of Love (reprint Features - 1985)
- 1989 – Dreams of a Lifetime (reprint Mike Francis - 1986)
- 1990 – Live at Manila (live)
- 1991 – Mike Francis in Italiano
- 1992 – Classics (compilation)
- 1994 – Francesco Innamorato
- 1995 – The Very Best – Live (live compilation)
- 1995 – A Different Air
- 1995 – A Different Air (Philippines edition)
- 1998 – Misteria
- 1998 – The Best Of (compilation)
- 1999 – All Rooms with a View
- 1999 – I Grandi Successi (compilation)
- 2000 – I Grandi Successi Originali – "Flashback" (compilation)
- 2000 – Crossing the Liquid Mirror (as Mystic Diversions)
- 2002 – Beneath Another Sky (as Mystic Diversions)
- 2003 – Colours (as Mystic Diversions)
- 2006 – From the Distance (as Mystic Diversions)
- 2007 – Wave a Little Light (as Mystic Diversions)
- 2007 – Inspired
- 2008 – Let's Not Talk About It (Japan reprint)
- 2008 – Flashes of Life (Japan reprint)
- 2009 – The Very Best of Mike Francis (All Was Missing) (compilation)
- 2011 - Anthology (compilation)
- 2011 - The Best of... (compilation)

=== Singles ===
- 1982 – "Love Has Found You"
- 1983 – "Survivor"
- 1984 – "Let Me In" (featuring Rossana Casale)
- 1984 – "Friends" (with Amii Stewart)
- 1985 – "Features of Love"
- 1985 – "Together" (with Amii Stewart)
- 1986 – "Iron It Out"/"You Can't Get Out of My Heart"
- 1987 – "Suddenly Back to Me"
- 1988 – "Still I'm Runnin' Back to You"
- 1989 – "Survivor '89"
- 1991 – "Livin' It Up"
- 1991 – "Se Tu Provi"
- 1992 – "I Want You"
- 1994 – "Bellissimi Occhi Chiusi"
