= Paradise Bird =

Studio album by Amii Stewart
- Released: September 1979
- Recorded: 1979
- Genre: R&B, pop music, disco
- Label: Hansa, Ariola
- Producer: Barry Leng

Amii Stewart chronology
Knock On Wood (1979)	Paradise Bird (1979)	Images (1981)

Paradise Bird is a studio album by Amii Stewart released in September 1979. The album yielded two European single releases, "Jealousy" (#58 UK, No. 4 Italy, No. 5 Switzerland) and double A-side "The Letter" / "Paradise Bird" (#39 UK 1980). The album was not as successful in the USA.

The original Paradise Bird album in its entirety remains officially unreleased on compact disc, though the entire track listing along with the previous album Knock On Wood, was included in the 2016 UK/European compilation Knock On Wood - The Anthology. A semi-official release was issued in Russia in 2001 on CD-Maximum, which also paired this album with the follow-up release Paradise Bird and one bonus track "My Guy, My Girl", and includes all original artwork.

== Track listing ==
All Songs written by Barry Leng, Simon May and Gerry Morris, except where noted

Side A:

1. "The Letter" (Wayne Carson Thompson) – 6:58
2. "Paradise Bird" – 6:35
3. "He's a Burglar" (Jerry Ragovoy) – 4:50

Side B:

1. "Jealousy" – 6:36
2. "Right Place, Wrong Time" – 5:07
3. "Step Into the Love Line" (Leng, May) – 5:23
4. "Paradise Found" – 2:26

== Personnel ==
- Amii Stewart – vocals
- Gerry Morris – bass
- Adrian Sheppard – drums
- Alan Murphy, Barry Leng – guitar
- Pete Arnesen – keyboards
- Ken Freeman – synthesizer, brass arrangements
- Ron Asprey – saxophone
- Glyn Thomas – percussion
- Jimmy Chambers, Charles Augins, Amii Stewart, Barry Leng – background vocals
- Ian Hughes – string arrangements

== Charts ==
Chart (1979)	Position
Australia (Kent Music Report)	89

== Production ==
- Barry Leng - producer
