= I'm Gonna Get Your Love =

Album by Amii Stewart

Studio album by Amii Stewart
- Released: 1981
- Recorded: 1980, 1981
- Genre: R&B, dance-pop, disco
- Label: Handshake Records US

Amii Stewart chronology
Images (1981)	I'm Gonna Get Your Love (1981)	Amii Stewart (1983)

Professional ratings
Review scores
Source	Rating
Allmusic	link

I'm Gonna Get Your Love is a studio album by Amii Stewart released in the USA in 1981, a slightly altered version of European album Images with the title track and "Calling For Your Love" replacing her rendition of "Great Balls Of Fire" and "Love Is Bad For Your Health". The singles released in the U.S. were "My Guy/My Girl" with Johnny Bristol, "I'm Gonna Get Your Love", "Why'd You Have To Be So Sexy" and "Digital Love".

I'm Gonna Get Your Love remains unreleased on compact disc.

== Track listing ==
Side A:

1. "I'm Gonna Get Your Love" (Raymond Rock) – 6:23
2. "Where Did Our Love Go" (Holland-Dozier-Holland) – 4:25
3. "Tonight" (Eddie Schwartz) – 3:19
4. "Save This Night for Love" (Ellison Chase, William Haberman, Art Jacobson) – 3:30
5. "Digital Love" (Randy Jackson, Narada Michael Walden, Allee Willis) – 3:49

Side B:

1. "Calling For Your Love" (William Anderson) – 4:53
2. "Why'd You Have to Be So Sexy" (Len Boone, Larry LaFalce) – 3:25
3. "Premiere" (Barry Leng, Simon May) – 3:32
4. "Don't Let Go of Me" (Randy Edelman) – 3:50
5. "My Guy/My Girl" (Duet With Johnny Bristol) (Smokey Robinson, Ronald White) – 3:59

== Personnel ==
- Amii Stewart – vocals

== Production ==
- Barry Leng – producer
- Simon May – producer
- Narada Michael Walden – producer
- William Anderson and Raymond Reid – producers

== Alternative album editions ==
- Images (original European album).
