= Pearls – Amii Stewart Sings Ennio Morricone =

Studio album by Amii Stewart
- Released: 1990
- Recorded: 1990
- Genre: R&B, Pop music
- Label: RCA Original Cast

Amii Stewart chronology
Time For Fantasy (1988)	Pearls – Amii Stewart Sings Ennio Morricone (1990)	Magic (1992)

Professional ratings
Review scores
Source	Rating
Allmusic	3.5/5 stars

Pearls – Amii Stewart Sings Ennio Morricone is a studio album by Amii Stewart released in 1990. The album covers many of film composer Ennio Morricone's best known songs, and was recorded with Rome's Philharmonic Orchestra.
The album has been re-released as My Heart And I, Desire, One Love, Saharan Dream and Here's To You.

== Track listing ==
1. "My Heart and I" – 4:56
2. "Desire (Chi Mai)" – 3:41
3. "Hurry to Me" – 4:08
4. "Come Sail Away" – 4:46
5. "Here's to You" – 3:50
6. "Song for Elena" – 4:45
7. "One Love" – 4:04
8. "Saharan Dream" – 3:07
9. "Sean Sean" – 3:36
10. "Could Heaven Be" – 1:58

== Personnel ==
- Amii Stewart – vocals
