= Deon Estus =

American bassist and singer (1956–2021)

- Born: Jeffery Deon Estus; July 4, 1956
- Origin: Detroit, Michigan, United States
- Died: October 11, 2021 (aged 65)
- Genres: R&B; pop
- Occupations: Singer; songwriter; bassist
- Instrument: Bass guitar
- Years active: 1975–2021
- Labels: PolyGram; Mika; Geffen; Polydor; Metronome
- Formerly of: Brainstorm; Boogie Box High

Jeffery Deon Estus (July 4, 1956 – October 11, 2021) was an American musician and singer, best known as the bass player of Wham! and as the bassist on George Michael's first two solo projects. Estus' solo single "Heaven Help Me", with additional vocals by Michael, reached number 5 on the Billboard Hot 100 chart in 1989.

== Early life ==
Estus was born in Detroit on July 4, 1956. He went to Northwestern High School. There, he sang second tenor in the choir under the direction of Brazeal Dennard. His bass guitar teacher was James Jamerson of Motown's the Funk Brothers.

== Career ==
Estus joined the R&B band Brainstorm as a teenager, recording two albums with them and scoring a hit with "Popcorn". During the early 1980s, he moved to Europe to join and tour with Marvin Gaye. He lived in Belgium and Ireland, before settling in London. He turned down the chance to play bass on Marvin Gaye's 1982 comeback album, Midnight Love, because he was so busy recording and he said that he was not aware that it would be the last album released during Gaye's lifetime. After his bass talents were recognized, he was invited to join the UK pop group, Wham!. He went on to tour China with Wham! and later backed George Michael on his Faith Tour. Estus later performed with Michael at Rock in Rio and continued to play bass as part of his backing band until Michael's death in 2016.

In August 1988, Estus released a solo album entitled Spell, produced by Colin Campsie and George McFarlane, with several tracks produced by Michael. Released before the album, the single "Me or the Rumours" reached number 15 on Billboard's Hot Dance Music/Club Play chart in 1988. In 1989, the album's title track hit number 11 on the Adult Contemporary chart. However, the album's biggest hit was the number 5 Billboard Hot 100 single "Heaven Help Me", for which Michael supplied backing vocals. It also peaked at number 3 on both the Adult Contemporary and Hot R&B charts. The album itself ultimately reached number 89 on the Billboard 200 and number 44 on the Top R&B Albums chart.

Estus also played with Tina Turner, Frank Zappa, George Clinton, Annie Lennox, Edgar Winter, Aaron Neville, and Elton John. In recent years, Estus was the featured bass player for the R&B band, Switch.

== Personal life ==
Estus was married, in his 20s, to Olga Johnson. This union produced one daughter. Estus also had three grandchildren. Divorced in the mid-1980s, he remained single, until his death. Estus died on October 11, 2021, at the age of 65.

== Discography ==
=== Albums ===
List of albums, with selected details and chart positions
| Title | Details | Peak chart positions | |
| Title | Details | US | US R&B |
|---|---|---|---|
| Spell | Released: August 1, 1988; Label: Mika, PolyGram; Formats: CD, CS, LP | 89 | 44 |

=== Singles ===
List of singles, with selected chart positions, showing year released and album name
| Title | Year | Peak chart positions | | | | | | Album |
| Title | Year | US Hot 100 | US R&B | US Adult | US Dance | CAN | UK | Album |
|---|---|---|---|---|---|---|---|---|
| "Love Hurts" | 1984 | — | — | — | — | — | — | Non-album single |
| "My Guy, My Girl" (with Amii Stewart) | 1985 | — | — | — | — | — | 63 | The Hits |
| "Spell" | 1986 | — | — | — | — | — | 151 | Spell |
| "1-2-3" | 1987 | — | — | — | — | — | — | Non-album single |
| "Me or the Rumours" | 1988 | — | — | — | 15 | — | — | Spell |
| "Heaven Help Me" | 1989 | 5 | 3 | 3 | — | 4 | 41 | Spell |
| "Spell" (re-release) | 1989 | — | 74 | 11 | — | — | — | Spell |
"—" denotes a recording that did not chart or was not released in that territory.
