= Knock on Wood (Amii Stewart album) =

Studio album by Amii Stewart
- Released: February 1979
- Genre: Disco
- Producer: Barry Leng

Amii Stewart chronology
Knock on Wood (1979)	Paradise Bird (1979)

Singles from Amii Stewart
- 1. "Knock on Wood" Released: 1978; 2. "You Really Touched My Heart" Released: 1978 (UK only); 3. "Light My Fire" Released: 1979

Professional ratings
Review scores
Source	Rating
AllMusic	(not rated)
Smash Hits	5/10

Knock on Wood, titled Amii Stewart in the UK, is the first album by Amii Stewart, released in February 1979. The album yielded two successful single releases, "Knock on Wood" and "Light My Fire". A double A-side single with remixed versions of "Knock on Wood" and "Light My Fire" reached number 7 on the UK charts in 1985 followed by a re-issue of "You Really Touched My Heart".

The album was included on the 2016 UK/European compilation Knock on Wood – The Anthology.

== Track listing ==
All songs written by Barry Leng and Simon May, except where noted

=== Side A ===
1. "Knock on Wood" (Eddie Floyd, Steve Cropper) – 6:11
2. "You Really Touched My Heart" – 4:29
3. "Light My Fire" / "137 Disco Heaven" (The Doors / Leng, May) – 8:26

=== Side B ===
1. "Bring It on Back to Me" – 3:56
2. "Closest Thing to Heaven" – 3:44
3. "Am I Losing You" (Barry Leng, Gerry Morris) – 3:20
4. "Get Your Love Back" (Kenneth Gamble, Leon Huff) – 3:56
5. "Only a Child in Your Eyes" – 3:07

== Personnel ==
- Amii Stewart – vocals
- Jimmy Chambers – backing vocals
- Sheen – backing vocals
- Tony Jackson – backing vocals
- Gerry Morris – bass guitar, backing vocals
- Adrian Sheppard, Peter Boita – drums
- Alan Murphy – guitar
- Barry Leng – guitar, backing vocals
- Ian Hughes – keyboards
- Pete Arnesen – keyboards
- Simon May – keyboards
- Glyn Thomas – percussion
- Ken Freeman – synthesizer

=== Production ===
- Producer – Barry Leng
- Brass arrangement – Ken Freeman
- String arrangement – Ian Hughes
- Engineering (Marquee Studio) – John Eden, Phil Harding, Steve Holroyd
- Engineering (Red Bus Studio) – Geoff Calver, Tony Swain
- Engineering (T. W. Studio) – Alan Winstanley
- Engineering (Utopia Studio) – Greg Walsh, John Mackswith
- Mastering – Ian Cooper
- Recorded at T. W. Studio, Utopia Studio, Marquee Studio and Red Bus Studio

== Charts ==
Chart (1979)	Position
Australia (Kent Music Report)	38
Canada (RPM)	2
Finland (Suomen virallinen albumilista)	10
France (Institut français d'opinion publique)	1
Italy (Musica e dischi)	10
Sweden (Sverigetopplistan)	3
U.S. Billboard 200	19
U.S. Top R&B/Hip-Hop Albums	9

== Certifications ==
Region	Certification	Certified units/sales
Canada (Music Canada)	Platinum	100,000^{^}
United States (RIAA)	Gold	500,000^{^}
^{^} Shipments figures based on certification alone.
