= Friends (Amii Stewart song) =

Single by Amii Stewart

from the album Try Love
- B-side: "Picture"
- Released: 1984
- Genre: Italo disco
- Length: 7:15
- Label: RCA
- Songwriter: Mike Francis
- Producer: Paul Micioni

Amii Stewart singles chronology
"Grazie Perchè" (1983)	"Friends" (1984)	"Try Love" (1984)

"Friends" is a song by American singer Amii Stewart, released as a single in 1984. The song contains backing vocals by Italian musician Mike Francis, who also wrote and composed the song. It did not initially appear on Stewart's 1984 album Try Love, except for the Dutch release, but an extended version was included on later pressings of the album. It was a hit in the UK, peaking at No. 12 on the UK Singles Chart. In the U.S., the song reached No. 46 on the Billboard Hot Black Singles chart in 1985. In Italy, the song went to number one.

== Reception ==
In his book In Pista!, Italian writer Rocco Bargioni describes Francis’s songs as “very stylish and very elegant, often romantic. They’re probably a good step ahead of much of the rest of Italo disco. They’re perfect for a DJ set at a sophisticated cocktail bar on a Friday night—at least until someone comes up to you and asks you to play something more well-known.”
