= Amii Stewart =

American disco singer (born 1955)

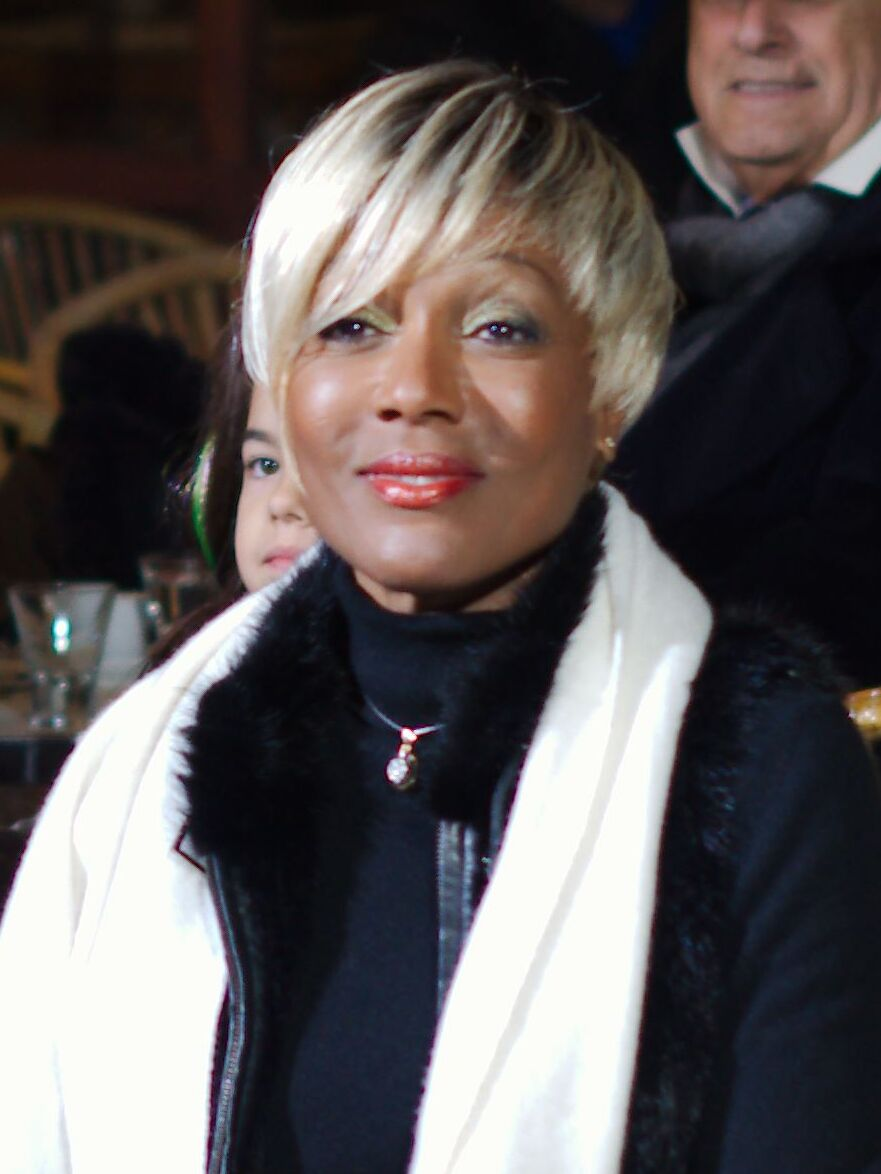
- Stewart at the Capri Film Festival in December 2013

Background information
- Born: Amy Paulette Stewart; January 29, 1956 (age 70)
- Origin: Washington, D.C., USA
- Genres: Soul; disco; dance-pop
- Occupation: Singer
- Years active: 1977–present
- Labels: Ariola; RCA
- Website: Amii Stewart

Amy Paulette "Amii" Stewart (born January 29, 1956) is an American disco and soul singer who came to prominence with her 1979 U.S. Billboard number 1 hit cover of Eddie Floyd's song "Knock on Wood", often considered a classic of the disco genre. Other singles include "Light My Fire" (1979) and "Friends" (1985). Stewart is the stepsister of actress-singer Miquel Brown and aunt to Brown's daughter, singer Sinitta.

== Career ==
Amy Stewart, the fifth of 6 children, was born into "a big, [strictly Catholic, but] fun loving, country style family... as my mum was one of thirteen children". Her father, Joseph Stewart II, signed her up for singing and dancing lessons in 1960, when she was four years old. Amy Stewart was already registered with the Actors' Equity Association, so she changed the spelling of her first name to Amii. She briefly enrolled in the Howard University in Washington but soon left for the Classical Repertory Dance Ensemble (CRDE) to study ballet and modern dance.

In 1975, before signing a contract at Ariola Records, Stewart worked at the touring company for the stage production of the musical revue Bubbling Brown Sugar, relocating to places of production, such as Miami, then New York city's Broadway and eventually London's West End, where she met Barry Leng, songwriter and record producer for Hansa Records.

The song "You Really Touched My Heart", a Leng/Simon May composition and produced by Leng, was Stewart's first recording, published by the end of 1977. An album followed, released in February 1979, which contained five Leng/May songs, one Leng/Morris song and three cover versions. The album yielded the single releases "Knock on Wood" and "Light My Fire/137 Disco Heaven".

Stewart's first single release, a disco cover version of the 1966 Eddie Floyd composition "Knock on Wood", reached number one of the U.S. Billboard single charts in April 1979 and earned her a platinum record and a Grammy Award nomination. It also ranked high in the single charts throughout Europe and reached No. 6 in the UK and No. 2 in Australia. Another single, a medley cover song of the Doors classic Light My Fire and "137 Disco Heaven", entitled "Light My Fire/137 Disco Heaven" was released in the same year, entering the charts and reached No. 5 in the UK, No. 14 in Australia and No. 69 in the US.

== Later career ==
In the 1998 movie 54, actress/singer Mary Griffin portrayed Stewart, performing the song "Knock on Wood", at the famed discothèque Studio 54 in New York City. While performing, Griffin wore an apparently very similar extravagant outfit (and particularly the headgear) to that which Stewart wore in the official video to "Knock on Wood" in 1979. Although it was obvious that Griffin was portraying Stewart, the credits at the end of the movie have Griffin's character listed as Disco Star.

In 2000, Stewart toured Italy, playing the part of Mary Magdalene, in a revival of the rock opera Jesus Christ Superstar. The play also starred Carl Anderson, who revived his role of Judas Iscariot from the 1973 movie.

In 2004, Stewart published the studio album Lady Day, containing sixteen cast recordings of the 2003 musical Lady Day, based on the life of American jazz and blues singer Billie Holiday and produced and co-written by Stewart and theater director Massimo Romeo Piparo. Stewart, starring as Holiday, states: "The idea for the musical was born from my passion for the wonderful voice of the 'Queen of Swing', but also for the music of the 1930s and 1940s and for the black renaissance of the time, of which she was the protagonist." and further: "In that period of racism the foundations were laid for the rebirth not only of Blacks, but also of world music."

Since 2001, Stewart has been working as a goodwill ambassador for Unicef Italia and has been involved in numerous projects such as "Uniti per i bambini, Uniti contro l'AIDS" ("United for the children, united against AIDS"). In 2006, she recorded the charity single "Love Song" for UNICEF in four different languages, once again returning to work with Ennio Morricone. The following year saw her return to duet with Mike Francis on the track "Nothing Can Come Between Us". In 2006, Stewart and long-time friend and collaborator Ennio Morricone released the 5 track single "Love Song", sung in English, Italian, French, Spanish as well as a multilingual version. All proceeds from the single went to Unicef's campaign "Check Out For Children".

In May 2007, Stewart again participated in the Sanremo Music Festival, performing the duet "Schiavo D'Amore" with Piero Mazzocchetti.

In 2014, she took part in the prime-time Rai TV show La Pista as teamleader of the "Virality" dance troupe. Stewart and the dance team became the overall competition winners. Other well known singer-contestants included Tony Hadley and Sabrina Salerno.

Stewart has been greatly affected by Italy, and living in Rome since the mid-1980s, has become fluent in Italian. UNICEF Italia introduces her in a mutually cordial tone, pointing out: "The one between Amii Stewart and Italy is a beautiful love story" and that she "has been 'adopted' by our country and has certainly returned the affection received".

== Discography ==
- Knock on Wood (1979)
- Paradise Bird (1979)
- Images (1981) (released in North America as I'm Gonna Get Your Love)
- Amii Stewart (1983)
- Try Love (1984)
- Amii (1986)
- Time for Fantasy (1988)
- Pearls – Amii Stewart Sings Ennio Morricone (1990)
- Magic (1992)
- Lady to Ladies (1994)
- The Men I Love (1995)
- Love Affair (1996)
- Unstoppable (1999)
- Lady Day (2004)
- Caracciolo Street (2010)
- Intense (2012)
