= Heather Holley =

American music producer, songwriter, vocalist

- Born: Heather Noelle Holley
- Origin: Austin, Texas, US
- Genres: Pop
- Occupations: record producer, songwriter, composer, vocal producer, A&R,
- Years active: 1999–present
- Labels: Elicit Productions, RCA, EMI

Heather Noelle Holley is an American music producer, songwriter, vocalist, vocal producer, composer, pianist, and Pro Tools engineer, whose credits have yielded combined sales of over 29 million albums. She specializes in artist development and is known for her role in launching Christina Aguilera's career. She and Elicit Productions partner Rob Hoffman (Michael Jackson, Quincy Jones, Etta James), wrote and produced the recordings that led to Aguilera's signing to RCA Records.

Holley has also developed and/or worked with artists including Meredith O'Connor; Holly Brook aka Skylar Grey; Jackie Evancho; Nikki Williams; Katie Costello; Bebe Rexha; Martha Wash; Rebekah del Rio; Kat Perkins; Itaal Shur; and Dave Eggar. Her songs have been featured in prime time television series such as Grey's Anatomy, 90210, American Idol, The Office, Private Practice, So You Think You Can Dance, Ugly Betty, The Hills, Keeping Up With the Kardashians; feature films and trailers including Pursuit of Happyness, Kiss of the Dragon, and David LaChappelle's Rize; and runway shows for New York Fashion Week and ad campaigns for global brands such as Mercedes-Benz, Pepsi, and Microsoft. Heather has been interviewed for VH1's Driven: Christina Aguilera and two E! Entertainment Christina Aguilera Specials. In their show at the 2017 Nobel Peace Prize Concert, Le Petit Cirque performed to Heather's song We All Need A Hero.

== Charting ==
- Christina Aguilera debut album #1 Us Billboard 200 Album chart
- Christina Aguilera "Stripped" #2 US Billboard 200 Album chart
- 12th Annual Unisong International Songwriting Contest Winners – Siren Song by Caitlin Lowery, Heather Holley
- No Secrets (album) – Album charted #1 Billboard US Top Heatseekers.
- First Ladies of Disco #6 Billboard Dance Club Chart

== Appearances ==
- VH1 Driven: Christina Aguilera
- E! Entertainment Special: Christina Aguilera 2003
- E! Entertainment Special: Christina Aguilera 2009

== Published articles ==
- "Soaring With Christina Aguilera" – published in the Wall Street Journal on January 11, 2011.

== Discography ==
| Year | Song | Artist | Album | Label |
|---|---|---|---|---|
| 1999 | "Obvious" | Christina Aguilera | "Christina Aguilera" | RCA Records |
| 2000 | "Obvious" | Christina Aguilera | Remix Plus | RCA Records |
| 2001 | "Adore You" | Lisa Barbuscia | "Kiss of the Dragon Soundtrack" | Immortal Records |
| 2002 | "Soar" | Christina Aguilera | "Stripped" | RCA Records |
| 2002 | "Stripped Intro" | Christina Aguilera | "Stripped" | RCA Records |
| 2002 | "Stripped Part 2" | Christina Aguilera | "Stripped" | RCA Records |
| 2002 | "I Will Be" | Christina Aguilera | "Dirrty B-side" | RCA Records |
| 2002 | "Hot"; "No Secrets"; "Come Back" | No Secrets | "No Secrets" | Jive Records |
| 2002 | "Soar" | Christina Aguilera | "Honey" Trailer | Universal Pictures |
| 2003 | "Circle"; "Remember Love"; "Fill Me Up"; "Circle Goth Remix" | Suzy K | "Circle" | Vellum Records |
| 2004 | "Hello (Follow Your Own Star)" | Christina Aguilera | "Mercedes-Benz Commercial" | Mercedes-Benz/RCA |
| 2004 | "Album" | The Randies | "At The Friendship Motor Inn" | LoveGroove Records |
| 2004 | "Album" | Bernadette Moley | "All I Want" | Blossom Recordings |
| 2005 | "Album" | Holly Brook | "Holly Brook" | Independent |
| 2005 | "Soar" | Christina Aguilera | "Rize Soundtrack" and "Rize Film" | Silva Screen Records |
| 2005 | "Peanut Butter" | The Randies | "Of Hands and Hearts" | Music for the Tsunami Disaster Fund |
| 2006 | "Here To Stay" | Christina Aguilera | "Back To Basics" | RCA Records |
| 2006 | "Soar" | Christina Aguilera | "Pursuit of Happyness Trailer" | Columbia Pictures |
| 2006 | "All Will Be Forgotten" | Skylar Grey | "Like Blood Like Honey" | Warner Brothers |
| 2006 | "Album" | The Randies | "I Saw The Light" | LoveGroove Records |
| 2006 | "So Deep" | Walker Chris Cox | "Remixes EP" | Elicit |
| 2006 | "Together" | Actors | "One Life To Live Prom Night: The Musical Theme Song" | ABC |
| 2008 | "Album" | Katie Costello | "Kaleidoscope Machine" | Tiny Tiny Records |
| 2008 | "EP" | Caitlin Moe | "Caitlin Moe" | Independent |
| 2008 | "Miss You"; "Woman"; "Stranger" | Natalia Lesz | "Natalia Lesz" | EMI Poland |
| 2008 | "I Come Alive" | Lidia Copania | "Prezd Switem" | Warner Music Poland |
| 2009 | "Drop It Real Low" | Bebe Rexha | | Independent |
| 2009 | "Someone to La La Love" | Caitlin Moe | "GenArt Film Festival Trailer" | GenArt Film Festival |
| 2009 | "We All Need A Hero" | Sasha Lazard | Starlight Children's Foundation Theme Song | Starlight Foundation |
| 2010 | composer | various | "The D-Monster" short film | |
| 2010 | "Feel Good" | Official Hank | Microsoft Office 2010 Launch Flash Mob | Microsoft Office |
| 2011 | "China Feet" | Itaal Shur | "Beyond Tomorrow" | ITAALAVISION |
| 2011 | "Know Me"; "Everybody is a Star" | Richie Rich | NY Fashion Week Runway Show Hammerstein Ballroom | |
| 2011 | "Album" | Rebekah Del Rio | "Love Hurts Love Heals" | 1111 Records |
| 2011 | composer | Richie Rich, Paget | Big Breakin (short film) | Outfest 2012 |
| 2012 | "I Remember" | Alexandra Monir | "Timeless Novel" | Random House |
| 2012 | "Naked"; "Neverland" | Pati Sokol | singles | Pati Sokol Dream Production |
| 2012 | "Lovekill" | Justin Mise | single | Justin Mise |
| 2012 | "Sorry Doesn't Cut It"; "Close The Chapter" | Lucius Clark | singles | Lucius Clark |
| 2013 | "Fearless"; "Toxic" | Dana Lowrey | "Dana Lowrey" | Buckhouse |
| 2013 | "Alright" | Martha Wash | "Something Good" | Purple Rose Records |
| 2013 | "EP" | Charlotte Sabina | "Charlotte Sabina" | Teal Torch Media |
| 2013 | "In Love With You" | Natalia Lesz | "That Girl" | EMI Poland |
| 2014 | "Late 4 Wishes"; "Like I Do"; "Feed the Beast" | Karen Rubyn | singles | Karen Rubyn |
| 2014 | "Alone Together" | Sasha Lazard | "Lumiere" | The Myth of Red, Inc. |
| 2014 | "Fearless" | Kat Perkins | "Fearless" | Kat Perkins |
| 2015 | "Show Some Love" | First Ladies of Disco | single and remixes | Purple Rose Records |
| 2015 | "Soar" | Christina Aguilera | World Hunger Relief PSA | RCA |
| 2015 | "Stronger Than Us" | Meredith O'Connor ft Garrett Clayton | single | Metamorphosis Productions, LLC |
| 2016 | "Someday at Christmas" and "Little Drummer Boy" | Jackie Evancho | Someday at Christmas | Sony Music |
| 2017 | Sane, Pedestal, The Haunting, Wonderland | Jackie Evancho | Two Hearts | Sony Music |
| 2017 | "We All Need a Hero" | Le Petit Cirque | Nobel Peace Prize Concert Norway | Nobel Peace Prize Concert |
| 2018 | "Hold On" | Mathia | Charmed S1Ep17 | CW |
| 2019 | "Fresh" | TVTE | Dynasty | CW |
| 2019 | Old Enough to Vote | Jacob Tremblay | Twilight Zone- Jordan Peele | CBS All Access |
| 2019 | "Hero" from Songland | TVTE | Songland | NBC |
| 2023 | I Will Be | Christina Aguilera | Stripped 20th Anniversary | RCA |
