= No Secrets (No Secrets album) =

Studio album by No Secrets
- Released: August 6, 2002
- Recorded: 2001–02
- Studios: ACM (Guildford); Battery (New York); Lacarr (Stockholm); Subsonic (Brooklyn); Green Room (Tarzana); Village (Los Angeles)
- Genres: Pop; teen pop; dance-pop; R&B
- Length: 36:08
- Label: Jive
- Producers: Andy Goldmark; Jeff Coplan; Riprock 'n' Alex G; Pete Kirtley; Tim Hawes; Brian Kierulf; Joshua M. Schwartz; Douglas Carr; Joakim "Krax" Udd; Peter Boström; Adrian Gurvitz

Singles from No Secrets
- 1. "That's What Girls Do" Released: June 18, 2002; 2. "Kids in America" Released: 2002

Professional ratings
Review scores
Source	Rating
AllMusic	2/5 stars

No Secrets is the only studio album by American girl group No Secrets. It was released on August 6, 2002, through Jive Records. The album spawned two singles, "Kids in America" (a cover of the Kim Wilde classic and also from the Nickelodeon original movie Jimmy Neutron: Boy Genius) and "That's What Girls Do" (from the end credits of the Cartoon Network original movie The Powerpuff Girls Movie, later featured on the soundtracks for The Hot Chick and Sleepover). No Secrets received poor reviews from critics and was a commercial disappointment. Despite the album topping the US Billboard Top Heatseekers chart, the album only charted at No. 136 on the Billboard 200 and only stayed on the chart for three weeks.

== Track listing ==
No.	Title	Writer(s)	Producer(s)	Length
1.	"That's What Girls Do"	Nina Osoff; Richie Supa	Andy Goldmark; Jeff Coplan	3:10
2.	"On the Floor"	Brad Daymond; Alex Greggs; Andreao Heard; James Lloyd; Jeff Lorber; Danny O'Donoghue; Mark Sheehan; Christopher Wallace	Riprock 'n' Alex G	3:02
3.	"Skin Deep"	Tim Hawes; Pete Kirtley; Liz Winstanley	Hawes; Kirtley	3:23
4.	"Kids in America"	Marty Wilde; Ricky Wilde	Riprock 'n' Alex G	3:06
5.	"It's Alright"	Andy Goldmark; Jan Kask; Steve Robson; Sheppard Solomon	Goldmark	3:18
6.	"I'll Remember You"	Brian Kierulf; Josh Schwartz	Kierulf; Schwartz	4:08
7.	"Here I Am"	Douglas Carr; Jörgen Elofsson	Carr; Joakim "Krax" Udd; Peter Bostrom	3:08
8.	"Hot"	Adrian Gurvitz; Heather Holley	Gurvitz	3:40
9.	"I Know What I Want"	Gurvitz; Sarah Majors	Gurvitz	3:22
10.	"What Are You Waiting For?"	Goldmark; Mark Mueller	Goldmark; Riprock 'n' Alex G	2:53
11.	"No Secrets"	Gurvitz; Holley; Michele Vice	Gurvitz	2:57

Notes

- "On the Floor" contains a portion of "Crush on You" written by James Lloyd, Andreao Heard, Jeff Lorber and Christopher Wallace.

== Personnel ==
Credits adapted from the album's liner notes.

Vocals

- Liz Winstanley – background vocals (3)
- Rita Campbell – background vocals (3)
- Beverly Staunton – background vocals (9)
- Heather Holley – background vocals, arrangement (11)

Instrumentation

- Ejay – guitar (3)
- Chris DeStefano – guitar, bass, keyboards, drums (5)
- Andy Goldmark – bass, keyboards, drums, vocal arrangement (5)
- Brian Kierulf – guitars (6)
- Josh Schwartz – guitars (6)
- Mats Berntoft – guitars (7)

Production

- Jesse Gorman – assistant engineer (3)
- Jeff Kanan – assistant engineer (6)
- Joseph Lobato – assistant engineer (8)
- Matt Marrin – assistant engineer (2)
- Charles McCrory – assistant engineer (6)
- Richard J. Tapper – assistant engineer (1, 5, 9)
- Dave Valler – assistant engineer (3)
- Jennifer Young – assistant engineer (7)
- Rich Travali – mixing (1, 9)
- Chris Trevett – mixing (5, 6)
- Riprock 'n' Alex G – mixing (2), programming (2)
- Ren Swan – mixing (3)
- Douglas Carr – mixing (7)
- Jon Krupp – mixing (8)
- Rob Hoffman – mixing (11)
- Jiant – programming (3)
- Brian Kierulf – programming (6)
- Adrian Gurvitz – programming (9)
- Tony Brock – programming (11)
- Chaz Harper – mastering

Artwork

- Elisa Garcia – art direction, design
- Albert Sanchez – photography

== Charts ==
Chart performance for No Secrets
Chart (2002)	Peak position
US Billboard 200	136
US Heatseekers Albums (Billboard)	1
