= Hearts In Motion Gospel Choir =

The Hearts In Motion Gospel Choir (Gospelkoret HIM) is based in Oslo, Norway and has contributed on several album recordings and live shows. It was used as the Nobel Peace Prize Concert's house choir and has performed with Barry Manilow, Florence and the machine, Ellie Goulding, Angelique Kidjo, Ahmed Fathi, David Gray and the Norwegian Radio Orchestra. Its musical director is Øystein Lund Olafsen.
