= Stripped (Christina Aguilera album) =

Studio album by Christina Aguilera
- Released: October 22, 2002
- Recorded: 2001–2002
- Studios: Conway (Note: Tracks 2–8, 10, 14–16 and 20); Henson (Note: Tracks 14 and 18); NRG (Note: Track 18); Record Plant (Note: Tracks 2, 4, 15 and 18) (Los Angeles); The Enterprise (Note: Tracks 2–13, 16, 19 and 20) (Burbank); Electric Lady (Note: Track 9); The Hit Factory (New York City)
- Genres: Pop; R&B
- Length: 77:44
- Label: RCA
- Producers: Christina Aguilera; Glen Ballard; Rob Hoffman; Heather Holley; Alicia Keys; Linda Perry; Steve Morales; Rockwilder; Scott Storch

Christina Aguilera chronology
Just Be Free (2001)	Stripped (2002)	Justin & Christina (2003)

Singles from Stripped
- 1. "Dirrty" Released: September 3, 2002; 2. "Beautiful" Released: November 17, 2002; 3. "Fighter" Released: March 10, 2003; 4. "Can't Hold Us Down" Released: July 8, 2003; 5. "The Voice Within" Released: October 27, 2003

Stripped is the fourth studio album by American singer Christina Aguilera. It was released on October 22, 2002, by RCA Records. Looking to transition from the teen pop styles of her self-titled debut album (1999), Aguilera took creative control over Stripped, both musically and lyrically. She also changed her public image and established her alter ego Xtina. Musically, the record incorporates pop and R&B with influences from many different genres, including soul, rock, hip hop, and Latin music. Lyrically, most of the album's songs discuss the theme of self-respect, while a few other songs talk about love, sex and feminism. As an executive producer, Aguilera enlisted numerous new collaborators for the album.

Stripped received polarized reviews from music critics; many criticized its lack of musical focus, while some of them called it "almost" an album for grown-ups, with comparisons made to Mariah Carey and Janet Jackson. Commercially, Stripped debuted at number two on the US Billboard 200, with first-week sales of 330,000 copies. It was certified five times platinum by the Recording Industry Association of America (RIAA) for shipping over five million copies in the United States. The album also charted within the top five of charts in Canada, the Netherlands, Ireland, New Zealand and the United Kingdom. It is Aguilera's best-performing album in the United Kingdom, with two million copies sold. Despite its initial critical reception, Stripped and its singles received five Grammy Award nominations, including one win, and has since gone on to receive critical praise. The album has sold over 12 million copies worldwide, making it one of the best-selling albums of the 21st century.

Five singles were released from Stripped. The lead single "Dirrty" was met with criticism and controversy due to its sexual music video but was an international hit on the charts. The follow-up "Beautiful" was praised by critics and garnered chart success worldwide. The last three singles, "Fighter", "Can't Hold Us Down" and "The Voice Within", became top-ten hits in various countries. Aguilera performed various songs from Stripped live during a number of shows, notably during the 2002 MTV Europe Music Awards, the American Music Awards of 2003 (January), and the 2003 MTV Video Music Awards. Two concert tours were held in 2003 to promote the album, The Justified & Stripped Tour (co-headlined with Justin Timberlake) and The Stripped Tour.

== Background and development ==
"I feel like it is a new beginning, a re-introduction of myself as a new artist in a way, because for the first time people are really seeing and getting to know how I really am. I got a chance to show of all these colors and textures of my love of music and of my vocal range. Coming off of the height of being a part of such a big pop-craze phenomenon, that imagery of that cookie-cutter sweetheart, without it being me, I just had to take it all down and get it away from me. And that is why I actually named the album Stripped, because it is about being emotionally stripped down and pretty bare to open my soul and heart."

— Aguilera to MTV News on the concept of Stripped

Following the release of her self-titled debut album in 1999, Aguilera had achieved major success with four worldwide hits, including "Genie in a Bottle" and "What a Girl Wants". Despite the international success, Aguilera was unsatisfied with the music and image that her former manager Steve Kurtz, had created for her, having been marketed as a bubblegum pop singer because of the genre's financial lure. She mentioned plans for her next album to have more musical and lyrical depth.

By late 2000, Aguilera decided not to continue the contract with Kurtz. After terminating Kurtz's services, Irving Azoff was hired as her new manager. Following the managerial shakeup, Aguilera decided to create her new style of music on the following album. She also used her new alter ego Xtina. She also changed her public appearance and persona, with her hair dyed black and nude photographs on magazine covers. Aguilera further commented about the event with USA Today: "When you're part of a pop phenomenon, you have so many opinions shoved down your throat. People try to tell you what you should do, how you should act, what you should wear, who you should be with. At the time things started happening for me, it was popular to be the squeaky-clean, cookie-cutter pop singer. But that role didn't speak to me, because it's so boring and superficial".

== Recording and production ==
In December 2000, Aguilera announced that she would begin recording material for her fourth studio album in February 2001. Aguilera had initially planned for the album to be released in the spring or summer of 2001, but in July, she said she intended to release it that fall. According to producer Steve Morales, RCA Records offered Aguilera an advance of US$5 million that year to complete the record sooner, which she rejected. In September, a representative for Aguilera said that the album would not be released until 2002.

In January 2002, a rep for RCA Records said the album would be released that June. By June, the record had been set for a tentative September 17 release; in August, it was ultimately postponed to its final release of late October. Aguilera later remarked that recording sessions had taken much longer than she first anticipated. She explained that many issues arose during that time, including her first breakup with her first boyfriend Jorge Santos. Aguilera believed that the lyrics of Stripped were so personal, and her vocals "represent a rawer, more bare-bones approach as well, with less of the ostentatious riffing that has miffed critics in the past". She stated, "I did the vocal gymnastics thing because it was fun. That's why I like blues, too, because you can experiment more with that side of your voice. But I thought the lyrics on this record are so personal, deep and good that I wanted to make them stand out more than what I could do with my voice technically". The recording sessions took place in studios around California and New York City, including Electric Lady Studios and The Hit Factory in New York City, The Enterprise Studios in Burbank, and Conway Recording Studios, Record Plant and NRG Recording Studios in Los Angeles.

On Stripped, Aguilera enlisted a wide range of songwriters and producers, including Alicia Keys, Scott Storch, and Linda Perry. Perry was one of the biggest influences to Aguilera during the making of the album. The singer stated, "She taught me that imperfections are good and should be kept because it comes from the heart. It makes things more believable and it's brave to share them with the world." Keys joined on the track "Impossible", which was recorded at Electric Lady Studios in New York City. Another notable producer is Storch; he wrote and produced a total of seven songs from Stripped, including two singles. He stated that during the making of Stripped, Aguilera was one of his friends that he cared most. However, Storch did not produce her fifth studio album Back to Basics (2006), which started a feud between the two artists, which was stated by Aguilera in one of the track from Back to Basics, "F.U.S.S. (Interlude)".

== Music and lyrics ==
Stripped is a pop and R&B record which incorporates elements of many different genres, including soul, hip hop, heavy metal, rock, rock and roll, gospel, and Latin. The album broke her teen pop root from her self-titled debut studio album (1999). According to Aguilera, she wanted to be "real" in her next records because she was "overworked" at the time she was "a part of the big craze pop phenomenon". Multiple critics criticized its musical style, calling it a lack of musical concentration. On Stripped, Aguilera became the writer of most of the songs. She also revealed that Perry's songwriting on Pink's second studio album Missundaztood (2001) inspired Aguilera a lot. She further commented: "I wasn't a big fan of the Dallas Austin songs, but I really, really loved the Linda Perry song".

"Fighter"
"Fighter" incorporates strong elements from rock, and arena rock. The song was inspired by Aguilera's unhappy childhood.

"The Voice Within"
"The Voice Within" is a ballad which talks about trusting oneself and inner beauty.

The album's opening track "Stripped Intro" describes her musical changes as she sings: "Sorry that I speak my mind / Sorry don't do what I'm told". The follow-up "Can't Hold Us Down" featuring Lil' Kim is an hip pop song which incorporates elements from dancehall toward its end. Lyrically, it talks about the theme of feminism, and was suggested that it is toward rapper Eminem and Fred Durst. The third track "Walk Away" is a piano ballad where she uses a "clever" metaphor to talk about an abusive relationship. Dotmusic editor Ian Watson compared it to Liza Minnelli's songs. It is followed by the fourth track and third single from Stripped, "Fighter", which incorporates strong elements from heavy metal and arena rock. It talks about a woman wants to thank a man who has done something wrong to her, and was inspired by Aguilera's unhappy childhood. It is followed-up by the interlude "Primer Amor Interlude", the Latin pop and flamenco track "Infatuation", and the interlude "Loves Embrace Interlude", respectively.

"Loving Me 4 Me" is a "sultry" classic R&B and neo soul ballad. The follow-ups "Impossible" and "Underappreciated" explore jazz and funk. The first of these incorporates a piano theme performed by Keys, while the second talks about the pain of a breakup. The piano ballad "Beautiful", which talks about the theme of self-respect, was deemed as the album's highlight by many critics, who praised its overall production. The next track "Make Over" is a salsa and dance-rock song that features a garage-rock beat. It was sued in the United Kingdom for illegally sampling the Sugababes' song "Overload" (2000), The Guardian also noted similarities between the two songs. Later, the American Society of Composers, Authors and Publishers (ASCAP) added the songwriting credits of Sugababes to the song. "Cruz" is a rock ballad that is musically similar to works of Michael Bolton. "Soar" is one of two tracks written for Stripped by Rob Hoffman and Heather Holley centered around themes of self-empowerment. The two next songs, "Get Mine, Get Yours", an R&B track, and "Dirrty", a hip hop and R&B-leaning anthem talks about the theme of sexual intercourse, and have been described as "majestically filthy". The latter is the remake of Redman's "Let's Get Dirty (I Can't Get in da Club)" (2001), and also features the rapper. The follow-up is the interlude "Stripped Pt. 2". The empowering ballad "The Voice Within" talks about trusting oneself. "I'm OK" is a ballad which incorporates strings and discusses Aguilera's abusive childhood with her father, and the final song from the album "Keep on Singin' My Song" incorporates elements from drum and bass with a gospel choir.

Additionally, a gospel-tinged song "I Will Be" appears on the twentieth anniversary version of Stripped, released in 2022. The track was composed circa 2000 by Aguilera, Heather Holley and Rob Hoffman, and the singer mentioned it in her interview for Rolling Stone in July 2000. Previously it was released as the B-side to "Dirrty" in the UK.

== Release and promotion ==
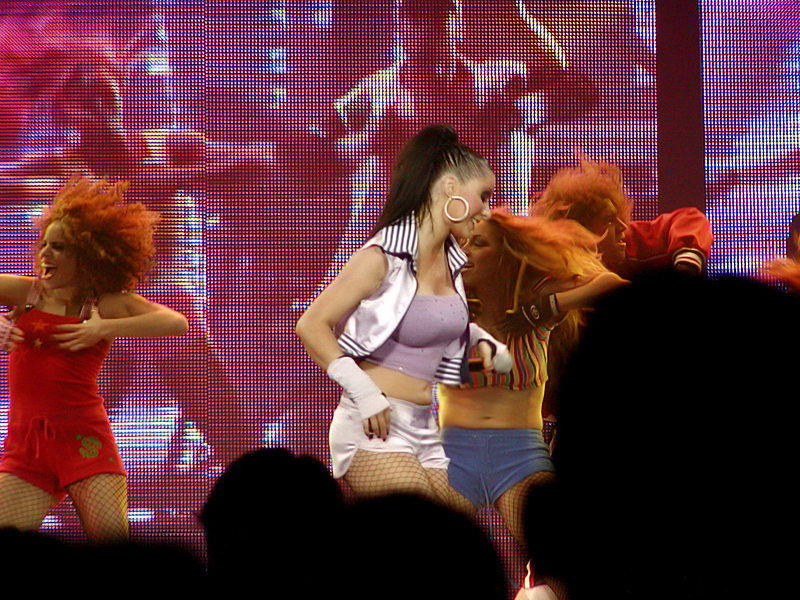
Aguilera performing "What a Girl Wants" during Justified and Stripped Tour at the TD Waterhouse Centre in Orlando, Florida on July 15, 2003

Stripped was first released internationally on October 22, 2002 and in the United States a week later by RCA Records. Aguilera appeared at a Chicago radio station B96's Halloween Bash on October 24, and performed four songs from the album–"Dirrty", "Get Mine, Get Yours", "Beautiful" and "Impossible". Four days later, Aguilera performed "Beautiful" on the Late Show with David Letterman, wearing a black gown, a black fedora, and black heels. She also performed "Dirrty" and "Beautiful" on Top of the Pops; the show aired in October. On November 1, Aguilera appeared on Today and performed "Beautiful" and "Impossible". On November 4, Aguilera was invited as a guest on The Daily Show to promote Stripped. At the 2002 MTV Europe Music Awards on November 14, Aguilera performed "Dirrty" with rapper Redman, recreating the stage as a boxing ring while entering the stage riding a motorcycle and wearing chaps during the performance, as seen in the music video for the song. On December 4, she performed "Beautiful" at the 2002 VH1 Awards. On January 13, 2003, Aguilera performed "Beautiful" and "Impossible" at the American Music Awards of 2003 (January). Aguilera gave a performance of "Beautiful" on Saturday Night Live on March 15, where she also sang "Fighter". At the 2003 MTV Video Music Awards on August 28, Aguilera performed with Madonna, Britney Spears and Missy Elliott a medley of Madonna's songs "Like a Virgin" and "Hollywood", and Elliott's "Work It". Towards the end of "Hollywood", Madonna kissed both Aguilera and Spears during the performance, making huge tabloid stories and fuss from the public, and marking it as one of the most iconic performances from the MTV Video Music Awards history. Later that night, she also performed "Dirrty" and "Fighter" with Redman and guitarist Dave Navarro. On January 16, 2004, she performed "Walk Away" on the Late Show with David Letterman. On February 8, Aguilera performed "Beautiful" at the 46th Annual Grammy Awards, where she also won a Grammy Award for Best Female Pop Vocal Performance for the song.

Aguilera also supported Stripped by embarking on two separate tours. In summer 2003, Justin Timberlake and Aguilera embarked on The Justified & Stripped Tour, which took place in North America. Talking about the tour, Timberlake said "[Aguilera]'s got one of the most amazing voices I've ever heard. That homegirl can sing ... this is why I am standing here". Several tour dates were canceled and rescheduled due to the collapse of lighting systems. An extended play entitled Justin & Christina was released exclusively at Target in July 2003 to promote the tour. The EP contains four remixes of Aguilera and Timberlake's songs from their respective albums, and two new tracks. In late 2003, Aguilera embarked on The Stripped Tour, the former's extension without Timberlake's acts. The tour took place in Europe, Japan and Australia. The former grossed a total of US$30,261,670, becoming the 16th highest-grossing tour of 2003. In May 2004, Aguilera was expected to return to North America during the second leg of The Stripped Tour. However, the 29 tour dates were canceled last-minute due to the singer's vocal strain. On January 13, an accompanying live video album of the tour, titled Stripped Live in the UK, was released worldwide. On December 8, a compilation album including both Stripped and Stripped Live in the UK was released in the United Kingdom.

=== 20th anniversary ===
On October 21, 2022, for the album's twentieth anniversary, Aguilera released a digital deluxe edition of the album with two additional tracks: "I Will Be" (the B-side to "Dirrty") and the Benny Benassi remix of "Beautiful". This was announced alongside new vinyl releases, HD remasters for music videos and a new music video for "Beautiful" which premiered on October 19, 2022.

=== Singles ===
"Dirrty" was serviced as the lead single on September 3, 2002. Perry and Aguilera's management wanted to release "Beautiful" as the lead single. However, Aguilera wanted to release a seriously "down and dirty" song to announce her comeback, so RCA Records decided to release it as the first single. Upon its release, the song received mixed reviews from critics; some of whom criticized its sound and negatively compared it to Britney Spears' song "I'm a Slave 4 U" (2001), while the others chose it as a standout track from Stripped. Its accompanying music video, directed by David LaChapelle, was criticized due to its sexual content, and sparked protests in Thailand. However, it was an international hit, achieving certifications in Australia, New Zealand, Switzerland, and the United Kingdom.

The album's second single "Beautiful" was written solely by Perry. Rush-released following the commercial underperformance and controversy surrounding previous single "Dirrty", "Beautiful" received universal acclaim from music critics. Commercially, the single gained impact on charts worldwide, peaking within the top five in many countries, as well as achieving certifications in the United States, Australia, New Zealand and the United Kingdom. Its music video, directed by Jonas Åkerlund, garnered critical acclaim from media outlets by touching on anorexia nervosa, homosexuality, bullying, self-esteem, and transgender issues. The video was honored at the 14th GLAAD Media Awards (2003) due to its positive portrayal of the LGBT community. "Beautiful" was listed as one of the greatest songs throughout the 2000s decade by Rolling Stone and VH1.

"Fighter" was released as the third single from Stripped on March 10, 2003. The single was well received by most critics, as well as achieving chart success in several countries and certifications in the United States, United Kingdom and Australia. Its accompanying music video, directed by Floria Sigismondi, was inspired by the director's dark theatrics and moths.

The album's fourth single "Can't Hold Us Down", featuring Lil' Kim, was released on July 8, 2003. It garnered mixed reviews from music critics, and gained moderate success commercially, receiving a gold certification in Australia. Its accompanying music video was directed by LaChapelle.

"The Voice Within" was released on October 27, 2003 as the fifth and final single. Critics complimented the simple piano ballad, which talks about the theme of self-respect. Its accompanying music video was directed by LaChapelle.

"Infatuation" was released as a promotional single in Spain on September 22, 2003. "Walk Away" peaked at number 35 in Denmark on March 14, 2008, despite never being released as a single.

== Critical reception ==
Professional ratings
Aggregate scores
Source	Rating
Metacritic	55/100
Review scores
Source	Rating
AllMusic	4/5 stars
Blender	3/5 stars
Entertainment Weekly	C+
Dotmusic	8/10
The Guardian	3/5 stars
NME	6/10
Rolling Stone	3/5 stars
Slant Magazine	3/5 stars
Stylus Magazine	F
Spin	6/10

Stripped received mixed reviews upon release. At Metacritic, which assigns a normalized rating out of 100 to reviews from mainstream critics, the album received an average score of 55, based on 14 reviews. Billboard was positive toward the album, writing that the album is "a must-heard recording rich with pleasantly surprising depth". In a mixed review, E! wrote, "If she had just shown up and sang her ass off, Stripped would've been a better show". However, the site also complimented "Beautiful", adding that "she [Aguilera] has still got better pipes than Britney". Josh Kun from Spin commented, "As an artistic statement, Stripped is all over the place; it's a move toward hip-hop, it's a move toward rock, it's ghetto, it's Disney".

Jancee Dunn of Rolling Stone provided a three-out-of-five-stars rating for the album, calling it "almost" an album for grown-ups, yet criticized its lack of musical concentration. In contrast, CDNow opined that "as a pop record, Stripped is practically flawless". Blender wrote a mixed review, yet commenting that it is better than Britney Spears' works. Writing for BBC Music, Jacqueline Hodges said that the album "is as full-on bold and over the top as most of Christina's outfits ... much of this seems to be an exercise in stretching the vocal chords [sic] to weak backing tracks". Rob O'Connor from Yahoo Music called the album "sophisticated", noting that is "includes actual artistic input from the artist herself", which, he thought, was "a wonder in these modern times". Jim Wirth for NME commented that Stripped is a "Mariah Carey album" comparing it to Carey's 1999 Rainbow. Sal Cinquemani from Slant Magazine commented that "The hip-hop-scorched 'Dirrty' is the most instantly gratifying track here (and, unfortunately, the only one of its kind), but it's Aguilera's collaborations with former Non-Blonde Linda Perry that find the singer truly naked."

Dotmusic's Ian Watson gave the album a high score (eight out of ten points), and commented, "Forget all you know about Christina Aguilera. She's discovered sex, rebellion, rock'n'roll and, at one amazing instant, drum'n'bass." He also added that Aguilera's voice "can shatter planets". In a negative review, The Village Voice criticized the album as a "nü-Mariah on mood stabilizers, extended with pseudo-pastiches of semi-popular songs". Todd Burns for Stylus Magazine was also negative toward the album, giving it an "F" score and wrote: "in between ten to twelve mediocre/good songs, we have eight to ten songs that would be better served as B-sides". Q provided a two-out-of-five-stars rating and commented that "Sadly, bra-burning rhetoric and gospel warbling make poor substitutes for addictive songs". AllMusic's editor Stephen Thomas Erlewine also wrote a negative review, commenting that the album is "the sound of an artist who was given too much freedom too early and has no idea what to do with it", although later he changed his opinion, giving it a higher score (four stars out of five possible). Writing for The New York Times, Jon Pareles commented that Stripped "is a blast of excess that risks alienating Ms. Aguilera's old fans without luring new ones, and it's bursting with misguided energy".

=== Accolades ===
Year	Award	Category	Nominee(s)	Result	Ref.
2003	Grammy Award	Best Pop Collaboration with Vocals	"Dirrty"	Nominated	
2003	GLAAD Media Award	Special Recognition	"Beautiful"	Won	
2003	Teen Choice Award	Choice Music – Album	Stripped	Nominated	
2003	MTV Video Music Award	Best Female Video	"Dirrty"	Nominated	
2003	MTV Video Music Award	Best Pop Video	"Dirrty"	Nominated	
2003	MTV Video Music Award	Best Dance Video	"Dirrty"	Nominated	
2003	MTV Video Music Award	Best Choreography	"Dirrty"	Nominated	
2003	MOBO Award	Video of the Year	"Dirrty"	Won	
2003	Q Award	Song of the Year	"Dirrty"	Won	
2003	MTV Europe Music Award	Best Album	Stripped	Nominated	
2003	MTV Europe Music Award	Best Song	"Beautiful"	Nominated	
2004	Grammy Award	Best Pop Vocal Album	Stripped	Nominated	
2004	Grammy Award	Song of the Year	"Beautiful"	Nominated	
2004	Grammy Award	Best Female Pop Vocal Performance	"Beautiful"	Won	
2004	Grammy Award	Best Pop Collaboration with Vocals	"Can't Hold Us Down"	Nominated	
2004	MTV Asia Award	Favorite Video	"Beautiful"	Nominated	
2004	Brit Award	Best International Album	Stripped	Nominated	
2004	Juno Award	International Album of the Year	Stripped	Nominated	
2004	Juno Award	Video of the Year	"Fighter"	Won	
2004	MTV Video Music Award	Best Female Video	"The Voice Within"	Nominated	
2004	MTV Video Music Award	Best Cinematography	"The Voice Within"	Nominated	
2004	MTV Video Music Award	Viewer's Choice	"The Voice Within"	Nominated	
2025	Las Culturistas Culture Awards	Album of the Year	Stripped	Nominated	

== Commercial performance ==
Stripped debuted at number two on the US Billboard 200 with first-week sales of 330,000 copies, behind Eminem's 8 Mile: Music from and Inspired by the Motion Picture, which debuted at number one with first-week sales of 702,000 copies. The album stayed on the chart until 2004, and was certified five times platinum by the Recording Industry Association of America (RIAA). By December 2009, Nielsen SoundScan reported that Stripped had sold 4,234,000 copies in the country, becoming her second highest-selling album in the United States, behind her self-titled debut studio album (1999), which had sold 8,207,000 copies. As of 2018, the album has sold over 4,423,000 copies in the country alone. In Canada, Stripped debuted at number three on the Canadian Albums Chart with first-week sales of 14,000 copies, and was certified triple platinum by Music Canada.

Elsewhere, Stripped was a sleeper hit, debuting low in many countries and eventually turning into a commercial success. In the United Kingdom, the album debuted at number 19 on the UK Albums Chart, peaking at number two. It became Aguilera's best-performing album in the country, spending 102 weeks within the top 100 of the chart, and was certified seventh platinum by the British Phonographic Industry (BPI). The album became the 29th bestselling album there throughout the 2000s decade in the United Kingdom, and the second highest-selling album by an American female artist in the country during the decade, behind Norah Jones' Come Away with Me (2002). As of 2006, the album had sold 1,850,852 copies in the United Kingdom, and was ranked at number 73 on the list of 100 bestselling albums in the United Kingdom during the same time. As of April 2021, Stripped has sold a total of 2,050,000 copies in the United Kingdom. In March 2015, the Official Charts (OC) reported that Stripped had become the 40th bestselling album of the millennium in the country.

Throughout Europe, Stripped peaked within the top ten in several countries, including Denmark, Germany, Ireland, the Netherlands, Norway, Scotland, and Switzerland. It was one of the bestselling albums in Poland in the first half of 2003. Stripped was certified triple platinum in Europe by the International Federation of the Phonographic Industry (IFPI) for shipping over three millions copies in the continent and was the bestselling pop album by a female artist of 2003. In Oceania, Stripped debuted at number thirty-three on the Australian ARIA Albums chart on November 10, 2002 and peaked at number seven in October 2003, spending a total of 67 weeks on the chart. It also peaked at number one on the Australian Urban Albums and spent more than two hundred weeks on the chart as of June 2007. It reached the top-five on the states album charts in Victoria, Queensland and South Australia. In New Zealand, Stripped peaked at number five. It spent 46 weeks on the chart and became Aguilera's longest-charting album there. It was certified quadruple platinum by the Australian Recording Industry Association (ARIA) for shipments of 280,000 copies in the country, and was certified double platinum by the Recorded Music NZ (RMNZ), shipping over 30,000 copies in the country.

It was the eighth best-selling international album of 2002 in South Korea, according to the Korean Music Content Industry Association. In Japan, the album reached number thirteen on the Oricon's chart. Stripped has sold over 12 million copies worldwide.

== Legacy ==
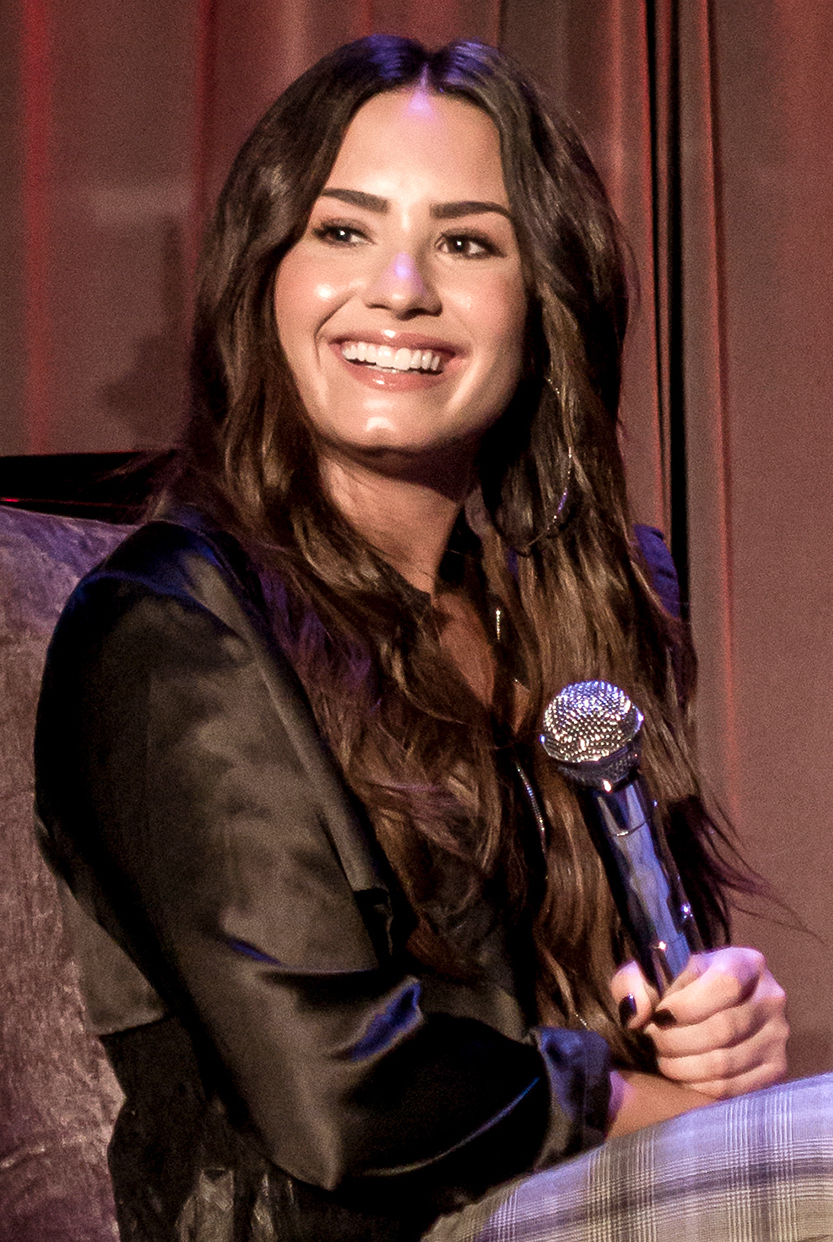
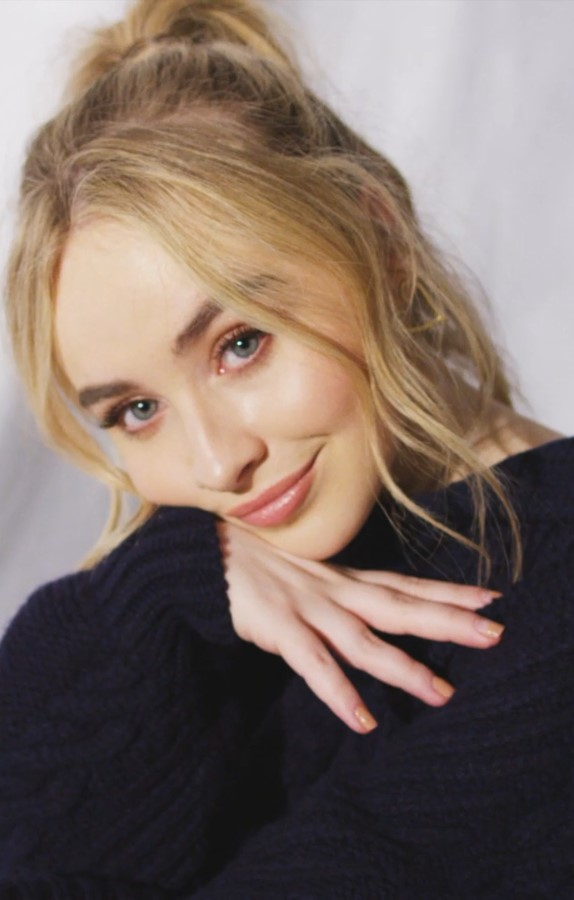
Demi Lovato (left) and Sabrina Carpenter (right) have credited Stripped as an influence for their own music

Stripped became one of Aguilera's strongest charting albums. In the United States, the album became the tenth bestselling album of 2003, and Aguilera was ranked as the most successful female pop artist of the year with six chart entries. Aguilera was the fourth most successful female musical act on the US Billboard 200, and the thirteenth overall. The magazine ranked Aguilera as the second bestselling female singles artist on the US Billboard Hot 100, only behind Beyoncé, and the top female Mainstream Top 40 artist. In 2017, Billboard named Stripped as one of the most important albums of the 2000s, noting the cultural and sonic influence the album had on artists including Rihanna, Demi Lovato, Miley Cyrus and Ariana Grande. They noted that:

Ultimately, Christina defining herself as Stripped was not an ode to her sexually empowered image, but representative of her peeling back layers and getting to the music and emotions that make up the vocal powerhouse as a human, including all her darkness, fears and insecurities.

Selena Gomez cited Stripped as an inspiration for her second studio album Revival (2015), saying: "That's one of my favorite albums and that was kind of what I started off Revival as, some sort of story. I mean, that album for her was incredible — 'Beautiful', 'Can't Hold Us Down', all of that — that's the stuff that I love". In an interview with People, Demi Lovato said that her album Tell Me You Love Me (2017) was inspired by Stripped. She also mentioned listening to Aguilera while growing up, and being "inspired by the black and white artwork". Charli XCX named Stripped "one of my favourite albums ever". Sabrina Carpenter has also stated that after hearing the album, "I knew that I wanted to sing" and began to see "songs as a part of what I could do to showcase and develop my own voice". The album was included in the book 1001 Albums You Must Hear Before You Die. Justin Myers of the Official Charts called the album "a phenomenon".

Despite the heavy criticism received upon release, Stripped has gone on to earn acclaim. The album's fifteenth anniversary in 2017 saw several critics reevaluate the album in a more positive light. Vice writer Sophie Wilkinson stated in a retrospective review, "Stripped still has merits beyond the cliché of a former teen star removing her saccharine casing to reveal her womanhood". She added that the album relayed feministic messages and that "15 years on, the album still gives any woman the confidence to speak up and be heard, to take charge of her sexuality and ownership of her body, or even just sing along loud enough to amplify its messages". In a Billboard article, Jeff Benjamin praised Aguilera for her feminist sentiment on the album's second track and fourth single "Can't Hold Us Down", while maintaining an openly sexual image, noting that it was not expected of feminists to be sexual at the time of the album's release. Benjamin also praised the album's ability to shift between genres and the personal content featured. He went on to say that Aguilera was continuing the legacy that "Aguilera helped build after the likes of Donna Summer, Madonna and Cher". The Fader named it one of the greatest, most "crucial" albums recorded by women.

HuffPost noted that with Stripped, Aguilera led the charge at the beginning of the 21st century in influencing and introducing the next generation feminist rhetoric into pop culture. In 2018, the enduring impact of Stripped was noted by the Los Angeles Times and other media outlets including Fuse, Genius and Vinyl with consensus; "Stripped proves as the blueprint for honest and raw female pop". Crack writer Emma Garland wrote that the album "is best measured by its cultural impact on those it was always intended for – a mass audience of young people who [...] had spent much of the late 90's and early 00's being patronised by an industry that served them dynamic but spiritually void bubblegum pop washed down with empowerment slogans from the Spice Girls". PopMatters editor Kimberley Hill named Stripped "one of 2002’s most intelligent and successful outings and among its most controversial, too", and praised the album for "tackling once-taboo subjects such as casual sex, infidelity, misogyny, feminism, and domestic violence". Carcy Magazine noted that with the release of Stripped Aguilera became "the queen of misfits", as she tackled "youth's silenced torments — mental health, sexuality, eating disorders", and she "shattered the schizophrenic denial of an industry both puritanical and sex-obsessed".

== Track listing ==
Stripped track listing
No.	Title	Writer(s)	Producer(s)	Length
1.	"Stripped Intro"			1:39
2.	"Can't Hold Us Down" (featuring Lil' Kim)	Christina Aguilera; Kimberly Denise Jones; Scott Storch; Matt Morris	Storch; Aguilera^{[a]}; E. Dawk^{[a]}	4:15
3.	"Walk Away"	Aguilera; Storch; Morris	Storch; Aguilera^{[a]}; E. Dawk^{[a]}	5:47
4.	"Fighter"	Aguilera; Storch	Storch; Aguilera^{[a]}; E. Dawk^{[a]}	4:05
5.	"Primer Amor Interlude"			0:53
6.	"Infatuation"	Aguilera; Storch; Morris	Storch; Aguilera^{[a]}; E. Dawk^{[a]}	4:17
7.	"Loves Embrace Interlude"			0:46
8.	"Loving Me 4 Me"	Aguilera; Storch; Morris	Storch; Aguilera^{[a]}; E. Dawk^{[a]}	4:36
9.	"Impossible"	Alicia Keys	Keys	4:14
10.	"Underappreciated"	Aguilera; Storch; Morris	Storch; Aguilera^{[a]}; E. Dawk^{[a]}	4:00
11.	"Beautiful"	Linda Perry	Perry	3:58
12.	"Make Over"	Aguilera; Perry; Keisha Buchanan; Mutya Buena; Siobhán Donaghy; Felix Howard; Cameron McVey; Paul Simm; Jonathan Lipsey	Perry	4:12
13.	"Cruz"	Perry; Aguilera	Perry	3:49
14.	"Soar"	Aguilera; Rob Hoffman; Heather Holley	Hoffman; Holley	4:45
15.	"Get Mine, Get Yours"	Aguilera; Steve Morales; Balewa Muhammad; David Siegel	Morales; Muhammad^{[a]}	3:44
16.	"Dirrty" (featuring Redman)	Aguilera; Dana Stinson; Muhammad; Reginald Noble	Rockwilder; Aguilera; Muhammad^{[a]}; Cameron^{[a]}	4:58
17.	"Stripped Pt. 2"			0:45
18.	"The Voice Within"	Aguilera; Glen Ballard	Ballard	5:04
19.	"I'm OK"	Aguilera; Perry	Perry	5:18
20.	"Keep on Singin' My Song"	Aguilera; Storch	Storch; Aguilera^{[a]}; E. Dawk^{[a]}	6:29
Total length:				77:44

20th Anniversary digital bonus tracks
No.	Title	Writer(s)	Producer(s)	Length
21.	"I Will Be"	Aguilera; Holley; Hoffman	Holley; Hoffman	4:12
22.	"Beautiful" (Benny Benassi remix)	Perry	Benny Benassi; Perry; Giancarlo Constantin; Ricardo Marchi	3:35
Total length:				85:31

=== Notes ===
- ^{^[a]} signifies a vocal producer

=== Sample credits ===
- "Make Over" interpolates "Overload", as performed by the Sugababes. Later pressings of the album contain songwriting credits for Keisha Buchanan, Mutya Buena, Siobhán Donaghy, Felix Howard, Cameron McVey, Paul Simm and Jonathan Lipsey; these credits were absent on initial pressings of the album.
- "I'm OK" contains an audio sample performed by Ellen Muth and David Strathairn from Dolores Claiborne, a film based on the novel of the same name by Stephen King.

== Personnel ==
Credits were adapted from the liner notes.

=== Production ===
- Christina Aguilera – vocal arranger and producer (2-4, 6, 8, 10, 16, 20)
- Glen Ballard – arranger (18), producer (18)
- Rich Balmer – assistant mix engineer (12)
- Tony Black – recording (9)
- Scott Campbell – recording (18)
- Andrew Chavez – assistant engineer (11-13, 19), assistant mix engineer (12)
- E. Dawk – vocal arranger and producer (2-4, 6, 8, 10, 20)
- Brian Douglas – assistant engineer (13)
- Ron Fair – executive producer, A&R
- Tony Flores – assistant mix engineer (14, 18)
- Brian Gardner – mastering
- Alex Gibson – assistant engineer (18)
- Jay Goin – assistant engineer (18)
- David Guerrero – engineer (11-13, 19), assistant mix engineer (12)
- Jeri Heiden – art direction & design
- Rob Hoffman – producer (14), recording (14)
- Heather Holley – producer (14)
- Alicia Keys – producer (9)
- Anthony Kilhoffer – assistant engineer (18), assistant mix engineer (2, 4, 15)
- Mark Kizula – assistant engineer (18)
- Stephanie Kubiak – production assistant (18)
- Aaron Leply – assistant engineer (2-4, 6, 8, 10, 14, 16, 20)
- Jolie Levine-Aller – production coordinator (18)
- Tony Maserati – mixing (2, 4, 15)
- Peter Mokran – mixing (14, 18)
- Steve Morales – producer (15)
- John Morichal – assistant engineer (2-4, 6, 8, 10, 14, 20)
- Glen Nakasako – art direction & design
- Miranda Penn Turin – photography
- Dave Pensado – mixing (3, 6, 8-13, 16, 19, 20)
- Linda Perry – producer (11-13, 19), engineer (11, 12)
- Oscar Ramirez – recording (2-4, 6, 8, 10, 14-16, 20)
- Rockwilder – producer (16)
- Rafael Serrano – assistant engineer (11)
- Jamie Sickora – assistant mix engineer (14, 18)
- Shane Stoner – recording
- Scott Storch – producer (2-4, 6, 8, 10, 20)
- Kevin Szymanski – assistant engineer (2-4, 6, 8, 10, 13, 20)
- Joann Tominaga – music contractor (14)
- Davy Vain – assistant engineer (11), Pro Tools engineer (11)
- Scott Whitting – assistant engineer (2-4)
- Ethan Willoughby – assistant mix engineer (3, 6, 8-11, 13, 16, 19, 20)
- Wassim Zreik – recording (2-4, 6, 8, 10, 14-16, 20)

=== Musicians ===
- Christina Aguilera – lead vocals, background vocals
- Alex Al – bass (14)
- Maxi Anderson – background vocals (14), choir vocals arrangement (18)
- Glen Ballard – guitar (18), arranger, keyboardist (18)
- Alexandra Brown – background vocals (14)
- Jasper Cameron – vocals producer and arranger (16)
- Matt Chamberlain – drums (18)
- Anson Dawkins – choir vocals arrangement (14)
- Eric Dawkins – choir vocals arrangement (14, 20)
- Darryl Dixon – horns (9)
- Richard Dodd – cello (11)
- Crystal Drummer – background vocals (2)
- Uriah Duffy – bass (9)
- Mike Elizondo – bass (18)
- Ron Fair – strings arrangement (15)
- Aaron Fishbein – guitar (4, 10), electric guitar (15)
- Damon Fox – keyboards (11)
- Brian Frasier-Moore – drums (14)
- Larry Gold – strings arrangement & conduction (3, 4, 8, 20)
- Eric Gorfain – violin (11)
- John Goux – guitar (4, 8, 18)
- Gary Grant – horns (10)
- Lily Haydn – viola (19), violin (19)
- Jerry Hey – horns (10)
- Daniel Higgins – horns (10)
- Charlean Hines – background vocals (2, 10)
- Rob Hoffman – guitar (14), programming (14), orchestral percussion (14), Rhodes (14)
- Kameron Houff – drums (2, 4, 20)
- Rufus Jackson – bass (9)
- Paul John – drums (9)
- Randy Kerber – keyboards (18)
- Alicia Keys – arrangement (9), backing vocals (9), piano (9), other instruments (9)
- Erica King – background vocals (2)
- Lil' Kim – featured vocals (2)
- Michael Landau – guitar (14)
- Tarus Mateen – bass (4, 8, 10, 20)
- Fred Maxwell – horns (9)
- Brian MacLeod – drums (11)
- Steve Morales – drum programming (15), arranger (15)
- Balewa Muhammad – vocals producer and arranger (15, 16)
- Dave Navarro – guitar (4)
- Linda Perry – bass (11), guitar (11, 19), piano (11), strings arrangement & conduction (11, 13), music programming (12), other instruments (12, 13)
- Greg Phillinganes – B3 (14), piano (14)
- Shanti Randall – viola (11)
- Redman – featured vocals (16)
- Bill Reichenbach – horns (10)
- Nolie Robinson – background vocals (2)
- Bill Ross – orchestra arrangement (14)
- David Siegel – keyboards (15)
- Alfie Silas – background vocals (14)
- Toya Smith – background vocals (2, 10)
- Ramon Stagnaro – acoustic guitar (6)
- Mike Stinson – drums (13)
- Ahmir "?uestlove" Thompson – drums (8, 20)
- Dan Warner – electric guitar (15)
- Maxine Waters-Willard – background vocals (14)
- David Watson – horns (9)
- Arthur White – guitar (9)
- Dwayne Wiggins – guitar (9)

== Charts ==
=== Weekly charts ===
Chart (2002–2005)	Peak position
Argentine Albums (CAPIF)	1
Australian Albums (ARIA)	7
Australian Urban Albums (ARIA)	1
Austrian Albums (Ö3 Austria)	10
Belgian Albums (Ultratop Flanders)	7
Belgian Albums (Ultratop Wallonia)	46
Canadian Albums (Billboard)	3
Danish Albums (Hitlisten)	5
Dutch Albums (Album Top 100)	3
European Top 100 Albums (Billboard)	3
French Albums (SNEP)	49
German Albums (Offizielle Top 100)	6
Hungarian Albums (MAHASZ)	39
Icelandic Albums (Tónlist)	14
Irish Albums (IRMA)	2
Italian Albums (FIMI)	16
Japanese Albums (Oricon)	13
New Zealand Albums (RMNZ)	5
Norwegian Albums (VG-lista)	10
Quebec (ADISQ)	10
Scottish Albums (Official Charts)	2
Slovak Albums (SNS IFPI)	20
South African Albums (RiSA)	4
Spanish Albums (PROMUSICAE)	14
Swedish Albums (Sverigetopplistan)	13
Swiss Albums (Schweizer Hitparade)	9
UK Albums (Official Charts)	2
US Billboard 200	2
US Top Internet Albums (Billboard)	2

=== Year-end charts ===
Year-end chart performance for Stripped by Christina Aguilera
Chart (2002)	Position
Canadian Albums (Nielsen SoundScan)	45
South Korean International Albums (MIAK)	8
UK Albums (OC)	110
US Billboard 200	122
Worldwide Albums (IFPI)	21

Chart (2003)	Position
Australian Albums (ARIA)	12
Austrian Albums (Ö3 Austria)	31
Belgian Albums (Ultratop Flanders)	17
Dutch Albums (Album Top 100)	11
European Top 100 Albums (Billboard)	10
German Albums (Offizielle Top 100)	16
Hungarian Albums (MAHASZ)	37
Irish Albums (IRMA)	5
New Zealand Albums (RMNZ)	21
South Korean International Albums (MIAK)	20
Swedish Albums (Sverigetopplistan)	27
Swiss Albums (Schweizer Hitparade)	54
UK Albums (OCC)	3
US Billboard 200	10
Worldwide Albums (IFPI)	16

Chart (2004)	Position
Australian Albums (ARIA)	58
German Albums (Offizielle Top 100)	68
Swiss Albums (Schweizer Hitparade)	88
UK Albums (OC)	65
US Billboard 200	143

Chart (2005)	Position
UK Albums (OC)	181

=== Decade-end charts ===
Chart (2000–2009)	Position
Australian Albums (ARIA)	66
UK Albums (OC)	29
US Billboard 200	77

=== All-time charts ===
Chart	Position
United Kingdom (2000–2019 Female Albums)	14

== Certifications and sales ==
Region	Certification	Certified units/sales
Argentina (CAPIF)	Platinum	40,000^{^}
Australia (ARIA)	4× Platinum	280,000^{^}
Austria (IFPI Austria)	Platinum	30,000^{*}
Brazil (Pro-Música Brasil)	Gold	60,000
Canada (Music Canada)	4× Platinum	400,000^{‡}
Denmark (IFPI Danmark)	Platinum	50,000^{^}
Germany (BVMI)	2× Platinum	600,000^{‡}
Hungary (MAHASZ)	Platinum	20,000^{^}
Italy (FIMI)	Gold	50,000^{*}
Japan (RIAJ)	Gold	100,000^{^}
Mexico (AMPROFON)	Platinum	150,000^{‡}
Netherlands (NVPI)	Platinum	80,000^{^}
New Zealand (RMNZ)	2× Platinum	30,000^{^}
Norway (IFPI Norway)	Platinum	40,000^{*}
South Korea	—	135,166 (Note: In South Korea, Stripped sold 83,156 copies in the last two months of 2002, as well sold an additional 52,010 throughout 2003.)
Spain (Promusicae)	Gold	50,000^{^}
Sweden (GLF)	Platinum	60,000^{^}
Switzerland (IFPI Switzerland)	Platinum	40,000^{^}
United Kingdom (BPI)	7× Platinum	2,100,000^{‡}
United States (RIAA)	5× Platinum	5,000,000^{‡}
Summaries
Europe (IFPI)	3× Platinum	3,000,000^{*}
Worldwide	—	12,000,000
^{*} Sales figures based on certification alone.^{^} Shipments figures based on certification alone.^{‡} Sales+streaming figures based on certification alone.

== Release history ==
Release dates and formats for Stripped
Region	Date	Format(s)	Label(s)	Ref.
Denmark	October 22, 2002	CD	BMG	
Finland	October 22, 2002	CD	BMG	
Norway	October 22, 2002	CD	BMG	
Sweden	October 22, 2002	CD	BMG	
Spain	October 24, 2002	CD	BMG	
Japan	October 25, 2002	CD	BMG	
Italy	October 26, 2002	CD	BMG	
United Kingdom	October 28, 2002	CD	RCA	
Australia	October 28, 2002	CD	BMG	
Germany	October 28, 2002	CD	BMG	
New Zealand	October 28, 2002	CD	BMG	
Portugal	October 28, 2002	CD	BMG	
Canada	October 29, 2002	CD	BMG	
France	October 29, 2002	CD	BMG	
Poland	October 29, 2002	CD	BMG	
United States	October 29, 2002	CD	RCA	
United States	November 5, 2002	Cassette	RCA	
Taiwan	November 6, 2002	CD	BMG	
Canada	December 2, 2002	Vinyl	BMG	
Germany	December 3, 2002	Vinyl	BMG	
United States	December 3, 2002	Vinyl	RCA	
China	May 5, 2004	Double CD	Sony BMG	
Japan	May 25, 2005	CD	Sony BMG	
Japan	August 9, 2006	CD	Sony BMG	
Japan	September 24, 2008	CD	Sony BMG	

== See also ==
- List of best-selling albums by women
- List of best-selling albums of the 2000s (decade) in the United Kingdom
- List of best-selling albums of the 2000s (century) in the United Kingdom

== Bibliography ==
- Canfield, Jack; Hansen, Mark Victor; Geffen, Jo-Ann (November 10, 2009). "Christina Aguilera: Fighter". Chicken Soup for the Soul: The Story Behind the Song. United States: Chicken Soup for the Soul Publishing. ISBN 978-1-935096-40-5.
- Dimery, Robert; Lydon, Michael (March 23, 2010). 1001 Albums You Must Hear Before You Die: Revised and Updated Edition. Universe. ISBN 978-0-7893-2074-2.
- Salaverrie, Fernando (September 2005). Sólo éxitos: año a año, 1959–2002 (PDF) (in Spanish) (1st ed.). Madrid: Fundación Autor/SGAE. p. 964. ISBN 84-8048-639-2.
