= Nobel Peace Prize Concert =

Annual concert in Oslo, Norway

Coordinates: 59°54′46.68″N 10°45′16.74″E

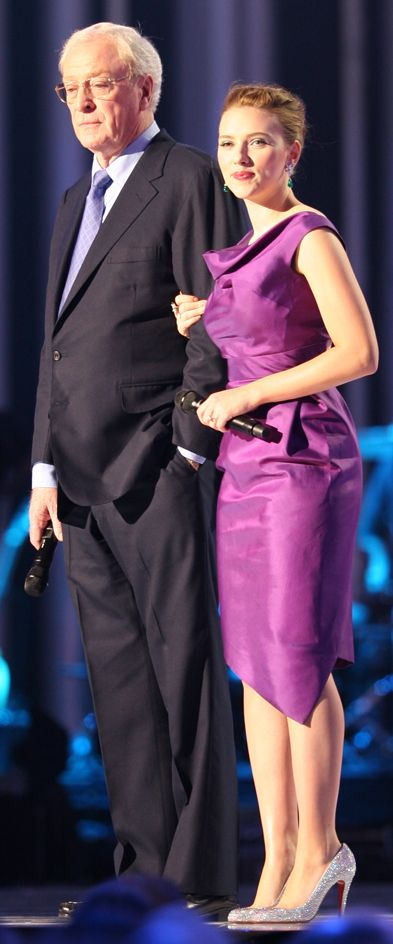
Scarlett Johansson and Michael Caine at the 2008 Nobel Peace Prize Concert

The Nobel Peace Prize Concert (Norwegian and Swedish: Nobels fredspriskonsert) has been held annually since 1994 on 11 December to honour the Nobel Peace Prize laureate. The award ceremony on 10 December takes place in Oslo City Hall, while the concert has been held at Oslo Spektrum, with the attendance of the laureate and other prominent guests. The Concert is broadcast to a global audience and reaches up to 350 million households in 100 countries.

In 2015 the concert venue was moved from Oslo Spektrum to the much larger Telenor Arena. The concert was held there until it was cancelled in 2018, replaced by an outdoor Nobel Peace Party which was organised outside the Oslo City Hall. In 2021 the Concert was relaunched in collaboration with the Oslo Philharmonic Orchestra, architectural firm Snøhetta and the Norwegian Broadcasting Corporation.

The concert features performers from a wide range of musical genres with the exception of the 1995 concert, which only consisted of classical works. Several editions of the concert are recorded, with different lengths and content, for airing in different countries.

The hosts give descriptions of the Nobel Peace Prize laureate's work as well as an interview with the laureate. The laureate gives a speech during the concert.

== 2018-2020 Hiatus ==
In 2018, the concert organizers announced that the show would be put on hiatus for 2018, hoping to hold a relaunched concert the following year. The official website stated, "The decision emerges from a wish to re-think the concert format and content but also reflects the challenging financial situation of the concert in recent years. Moreover, people's media preferences have undergone radical change since the first concert in 1994. This is something the concert organizers and producers are keenly aware of as they move forward. We have struggled to maintain an appropriate level of financing and want to use the year ahead to develop a new format for the concert. Our ambition is to launch a renewed and better concert in 2019. [...] We plan to use this break to further develop the format and strengthen the financing beyond the continuing and generous support of our long term Norwegian sponsors. The firmer our financial base, the stronger our independence in choice of concert format and profile, say concert producers Odd Arvid Strømstad (Warner Bros. Norway) and Kristian Kirkvaag (Gyro)."

== Laureates, hosts and artists by year ==
Since planning starts in January, the artists invited to the concert aren't typically connected to the winner, who is announced in October. However, a few late additions are usually made to reflect the winner. Originally, the show was hosted by Norwegian celebrities or television personalities. However, since the year 2000 hosts have with few exceptions come from the United States. The Norwegian Radio Orchestra is the main orchestra every year.

=== 1994 ===
Laureates
Yasser Arafat, Shimon Peres and Yitzhak Rabin

Host
Erik Bye

Artists

- Ofra Haza
- Mari Boine
- Ole Edvard Antonsen
- Nusrat Fateh Ali Khan
- Sigvard Dagsland
- Sinéad O'Connor
- Sondre Bratland

=== 1995 ===
Laureates
Joseph Rotblat and the Pugwash Conferences on Science and World Affairs

The 1995 edition of the concert only consisted of classical works.

=== 1996 ===
Laureates
Carlos Filipe Ximenes Belo and José Ramos-Horta

Host
Lise Fjeldstad

Artists

- Angélique Kidjo
- Annbjørg Lien
- Jan Garbarek / Angelite
- Joan Osborne
- Morten Harket performed the song "East Timor"
- Solveig Kringlebotn
- Sondre Bratland
- Sølvguttene
- Tata-Mai-Lau

=== 1997 ===
Laureates
International Campaign to Ban Landmines (ICBL) and Jody Williams

Host
Vigdís Finnbogadóttir

Artists

- Anne Grete Preus
- Boyz II Men
- Emmylou Harris – (special wish from the Peace Prize winner)
- Harry Connick, Jr.
- Jewel
- Mariah Carey – "My All", "Butterfly"; "One Sweet Day" with Boyz II Men
- Nils Petter Molvær
- Sinéad O'Connor
- Sølvguttene
- Youssou N'Dour

Producers

- Andrew Lanter- IMG

Harry Connick Jr brought 35 musicians with him on stage, when performing at the concert in 1997.

=== 1998 ===
Laureates
John Hume and David Trimble

Host
Åse Kleveland

Artists

- a-ha – "Summer Moved On", "The Sun Always Shines on TV";
- Alanis Morissette – "Baba", "Uninvited", "Thank U"
- The Cranberries – "Dreams", "Promises", "Linger"
- Elton John (Video screen) – "Your Song", "Something About the Way You Look Tonight"
- Enrique Iglesias -- "Esperanza"
- Espen Lind – "Pop from Hell"
- Hariprasad Chaurasia
- James Galway with Phil Coulter
- Oumou Sangaré
- Pandit Shivkumar Sharma
- Phil Collins – "Both Sides of the Story", "Another Day in Paradise"
- Shania Twain – "You're Still the One", "Black Eyes, Blue Tears"
- Sølvguttene
- Willard White (replacement for Andrea Bocelli)

Producers

- Andrew Lanter- IMG

At the concert in 1998, American TV network Fox, did not include A-ha's performance, which was edited out. Another performance edited out by Fox in 1998, was Norwegian artist Espen Lind's "Pop From Hell". The word "hell" was not the problem, but the following sentence: "You make me so hard/because you're a star". A Fox-producer stated it would be too much to take for the American family audience. Espen Lind was told his performance would not be edited out if he did not include the word "hard" in the song, but he would not change the lyrics. He said he did not want to let himself be controlled by a double-moralistic American family channel, and that such compromises were not acceptable for him to make.

=== 1999 ===
Laureate
Médecins Sans Frontières

Host
Claus Wiese
Voice-over: David Fishel

Artists

- a1
- Bryan Ferry
- The Corrs
- Denyce Graves
- Ismaël Lô
- Ladysmith Black Mambazo
- Ole Edvard Antonsen with the Norwegian Radio Orchestra
- Secret Garden
- Sting
- Tina Turner "When the Heartache Is Over", "Whatever You Need"

=== 2000 ===
Laureate
Kim Dae-jung

Host
Jane Seymour (short notice cancellation by Meryl Streep)

Artists

- Bon Jovi
- Bryn Terfel
- Eros Ramazzotti
- Femi Kuti
- Lee Ann Womack
- Moby
- Natalie Cole
- Sissel Kyrkjebø
- Sumi Jo
- Westlife

=== 2001 ===
Laureates
The United Nations and Kofi Annan

Hosts
Liam Neeson and Meryl Streep

Artists

- a-ha – "Differences", "Hunting High and Low"
- Anastacia
- Barbara Hendricks
- Daniela Mercury
- Destiny's Child
- International Children's Choir
- Jan Garbarek
- Kodo
- Natalie Imbruglia - "Torn"
- Paul McCartney- "Your Loving Flame", "Freedom"
- Russell Watson
- Wyclef Jean – "Redemption Song", "Wish You Were Here"
- Youssou N'Dour – "My Hope Is in You"
- Norwegian Radio Orchestra conducted by Paul Bateman

The 2001 concert's closing song was "Let It Be", performed by Paul McCartney and the other artists.

=== 2002 ===
Laureate
Jimmy Carter

Hosts
Anthony Hopkins and Jessica Lange

Artists

- Angélique Kidjo
- Hall & Oates
- Jennifer Lopez – "Jenny From The Block"
- Jessye Norman
- Joaquín Cortés
- Josh Groban – "To Where You Are", "The Prayer" with Sissel Kyrkjebø
- Laura Pausini - "E ritorno da te", "Surrender"
- Mari Boine
- Michelle Branch
- Santana – "Adouma", "Victory is Won", "Oye Como Va"
- Sissel Kyrkjebø – "The Prayer" with Josh Groban
- Suede
- Willie Nelson – "Always on My Mind", "The Great Divide", "Georgia on My Mind" (special wish from the Peace Prize winner)
- Norwegian Radio Orchestra conducted by Paul Bateman

The Grand Finale in 2002, performed by all the artists, was "Imagine" by John Lennon.

=== 2003 ===
Laureate
Shirin Ebadi

Hosts
Catherine Zeta-Jones and Michael Douglas

Artists

- Aretha Franklin – "Make Them Hear You", "Wonderful"
- Angela Gheorghiu – "Muzica"
- Orchestra Baobab
- Carly Simon – Let The River Run
- The Cardigans – "For What It's Worth", "Communication"
- The Chieftains – "40 Shades of Green" with Rosanne Cash
- Craig David – "World Filled With Love", "Hidden Agenda"
- Jan Werner Danielsen – "Air"
- The Kamkars
- Lene Marlin – "Sorry", "Hope you're happy"
- Roberto Alagna – "'O sole mio"; "Come prima" with Angela Gheorghiu
- Robert Plant – "Morning Dew" with Strange Sensation
- Tim McGraw – "Please remember me", "God's child"
- Norwegian Radio Orchestra conducted by Martin Yates
- Hearts In Motion Gospel Choir – "Air" with Jan Werner Danielsen

The Grand Finale in 2003, sung by all the artists, was "Imagine". Robert Plant sang and changed the word "religion" with "division" in the sentence "Nothing to kill or die for/ And no division too".

=== 2004 ===
Laureate
Wangari Maathai

Hosts
Oprah Winfrey and Tom Cruise

Artists

- Andrea Bocelli – "Dell'amore non-si sa", "In-canto"
- Baaba Maal
- Chris Botti – "Someone To Watch Over Me"
- Cyndi Lauper – "Time After Time"
- Diana Krall
- Joss Stone
- Patti LaBelle
- The Polyphonic Spree
- Sondre Lerche
- Suzanna Owíyo
- Tony Bennett
- Norwegian Radio Orchestra conducted by Martin Yates

The use of Tom Cruise as a host created some controversy both from people fearing it could be used to promote Scientology and from people who were unhappy with his supportive statements on the Iraq War. There was however no mention of Scientology during the concert and Cruise has stated his remarks on the war were misquoted. The Grand Finale was led by Patti LaBelle. For the third year in a row, the song chosen for the finale was John Lennon's "Imagine".

=== 2005 ===
Laureates
The International Atomic Energy Agency (IAEA) and Mohamed ElBaradei

Hosts
Julianne Moore and Salma Hayek

Artists

- Damien Rice – "Unplayed piano", "Cold Water"
- Duran Duran – "Ordinary world", "(Reach up for the) Sunrise", "Nice"
- Gladys Knight – "Party train / Friendship Train medley", "The best thing that ever happened to me", "I've got to use my imagination", "I heard it through the grapevine", "Midnight train to Georgia"; "I heard it through the grapevine" with Bubba Knight
- Juanes – "La Camisa Negra", "Sueños"
- Katherine Jenkins – "L'amore sei tu", "Un bel dì, vedremo"
- Katie Melua – "The closest thing to crazy", "I cried for you", "Nine Million Bicycles"
- Madrugada – "The Kids are on high street"; "Lift me" with Ane Brun
- Ska Cubano – "Chicago", "Ay Caramba"
- Sugababes – "Hole in the Head", "Ugly"
- Westlife – "World of our own"; "You raise me up" with Rolf Løvland and Fionnuala Sherry
- Yo-Yo Ma – "Haydn: Cello Concerto in C, third movement"
- Norwegian Radio Orchestra conducted by Martin Yates

The Grand Finale in 2005, sung by all the artists, was "Give Peace a Chance".

=== 2006 ===
Laureates
Muhammad Yunus and Grameen Bank

Hosts
Sharon Stone and Anjelica Huston

Artists

- Hakim – "Eda Ba", "Ya Albi"
- John Legend – "Save Room", "Used to Love U"
- Lionel Richie – "Dancing on the Ceiling", "I Call It Love", "Hello", "All Night Long"
- Monica Yunus (peace prize winner's daughter) – "O mio babbino caro"
- Morten Abel – "Big Brother", "Hard to Stay Awake"
- Nrityanchal, a group from Bangladesh (personal favorite of the Peace Prize winner) – Peacock dance
- Paulina Rubio – "Ni Una Sola Palabra", "Beautiful Lie" ("Miénteme Una Vez Más")
- Renée Fleming – "Vissi d'arte", "You'll Never Walk Alone"
- Rihanna – "SOS", "Unfaithful"
- Simply Red – "Something Got Me Started", "So Not Over You", "Stars"
- Wynonna – "At Last", "Ave Maria"
- Yusuf (Cat Stevens) – "Midday (Avoid Life After Dark)", "Peace Train", "Heaven/Where True Love Goes"
- Norwegian Radio Orchestra conducted by Nick Ingman

The artists joined Lionel Richie on stage at the end of the show when/after he was singing "All Night Long".

=== 2007 ===
Laureates
Al Gore and Intergovernmental Panel on Climate Change (IPCC)

Hosts
Kevin Spacey (short notice cancellation by Tommy Lee Jones) and Uma Thurman

Artists

- Earth, Wind & Fire – "Fantasy", "September"
- Melissa Etheridge – "I Need to Wake Up", "What Happens Tomorrow"
- Morten Harket – "Letters from Egypt" (with Sølvguttene) & " Movies "
- Juanes – "Minas Piedras"
- Junoon – "Bulleya"
- Alicia Keys – "No One", "Fallin'", "Human Nature"
- Annie Lennox – "Dark Road", "Sweet Dreams (Are Made of This)"
- KT Tunstall – "Hold On", "Suddenly I See"
- Kylie Minogue – "Can't Get You Out of My Head", "2 Hearts"
- Tine Thing Helseth – trumpet opening number
- Norwegian Radio Orchestra conducted by Nick Davies

=== 2008 ===
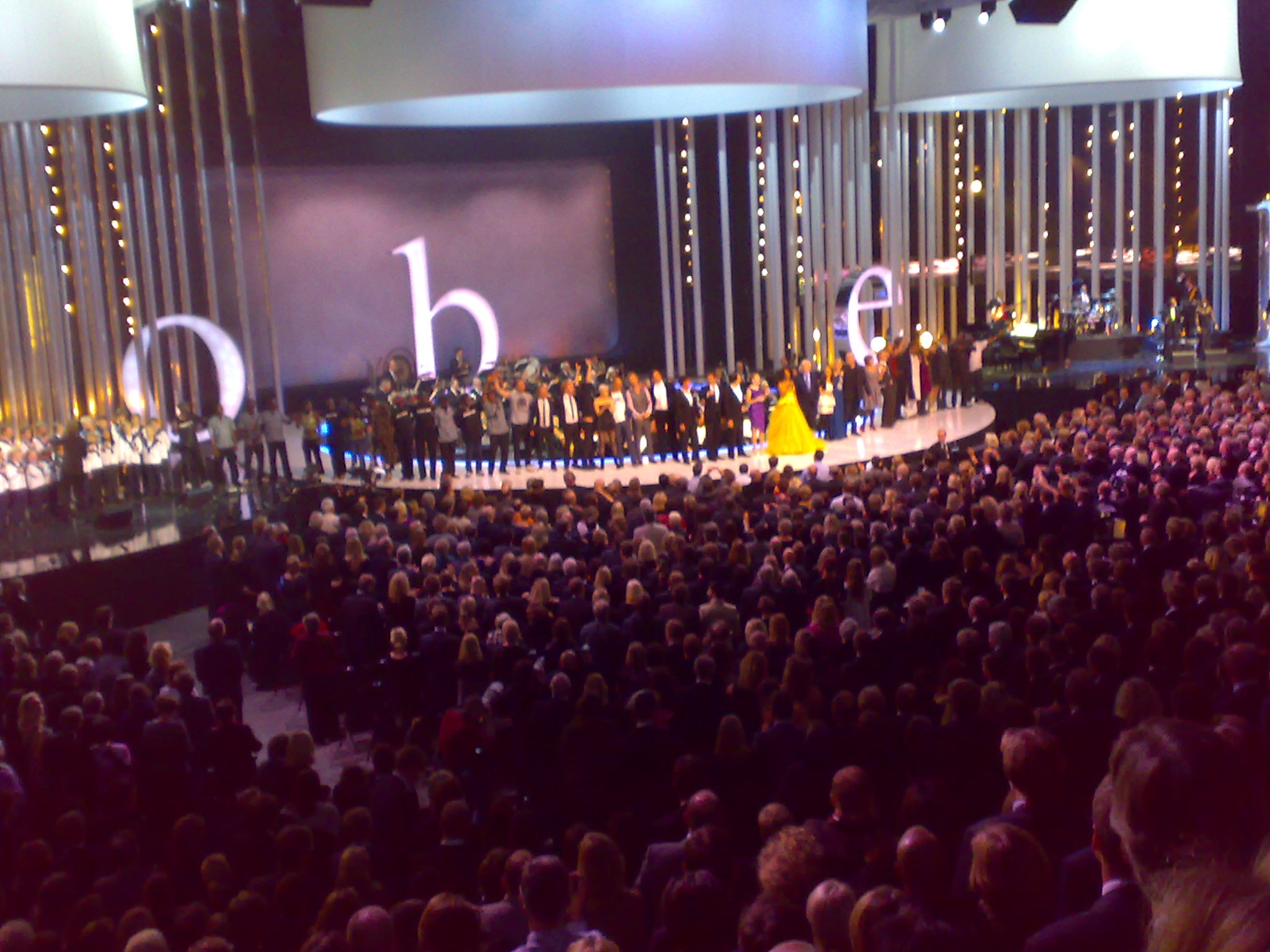
Diana Ross (in yellow dress) and the other artists round off the Nobel Concert 2008 in Oslo Spektrum.

Laureate
Martti Ahtisaari

Hosts
Scarlett Johansson & Michael Caine

Artists

- Iver Kleive – Overture
- Robyn – "With Every Heartbeat", "Be Mine!"
- Jason Mraz featuring Magne Furuholmen – "I'm Yours", "A Beautiful Mess"
- The Script – "The Man Who Can't Be Moved", "We Cry"
- Marit Larsen – "I've Heard Your Love Songs", "If a Song Could Get Me You"
- Il Divo – "The Winner Takes It All", "Adagio", "Somewhere"
- Dierks Bentley – "Free and Easy", "Feel That Fire", "Beautiful World" with Marit Larsen
- Julieta Venegas – "El presente", "Algún día"
- Seun Kuti & Egypt 80
- Elina Vähälä – "Fantasy"
- Diana Ross – "I'm Coming Out", "Where Did Our Love Go", "Baby Love", "Stop! In the Name of Love", "If We Hold on Together" (with Sølvguttene), "Do You Know Where You're Going To", "Ain't No Mountain High Enough" and "I Will Survive"
- Norwegian Radio Orchestra conducted by Nick Davies

The artists joined Diana Ross on stage at the end of the show when/after she was singing "Reach Out and Touch (Somebody's Hand)".

=== 2009 ===
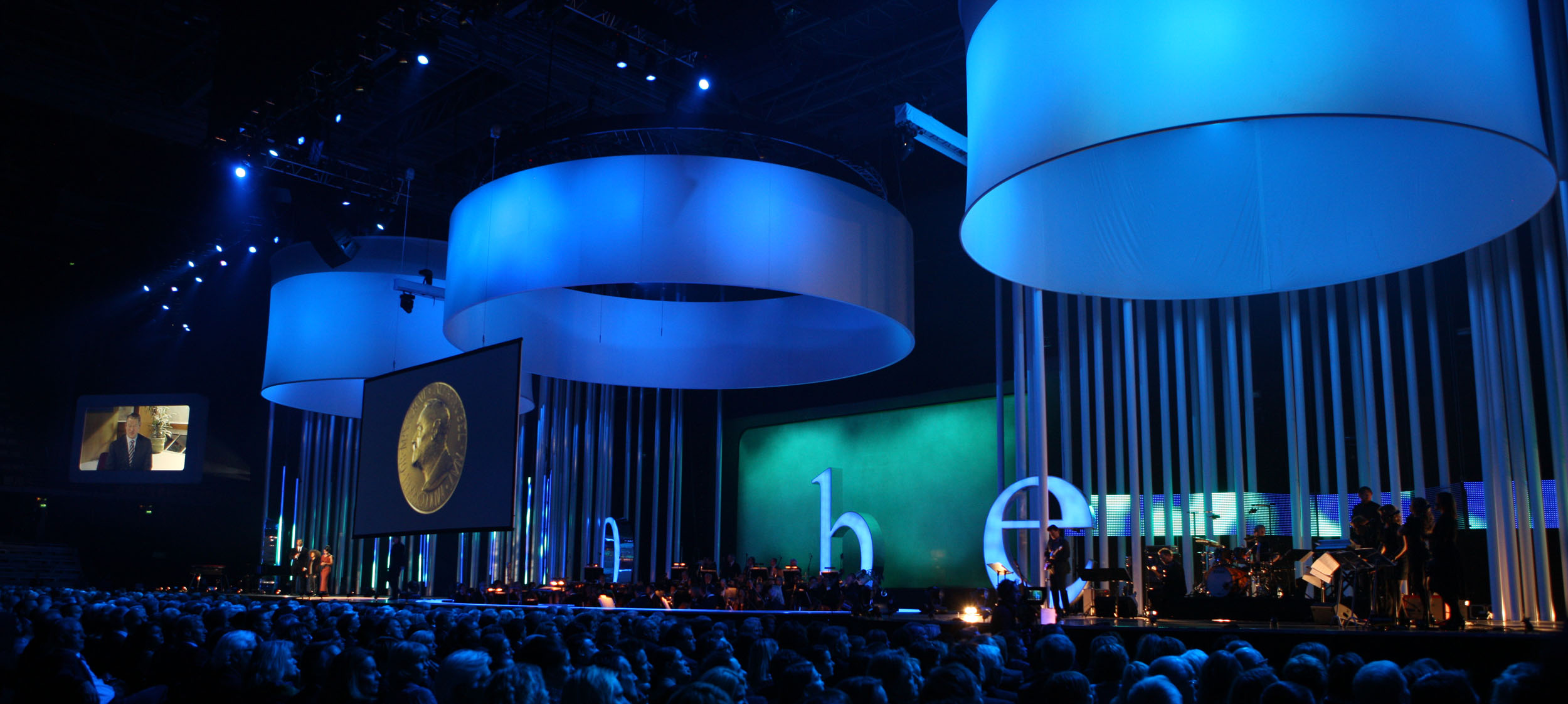
Nobel Peace Prize Concert 2009

Laureate
Barack Obama (did not attend the concert)

Hosts
Will Smith and Jada Pinkett Smith with additional appearance by their children Jaden Smith and Willow Smith

Artists

- Wyclef Jean – "Diallo", "Gunpowder" and "The Sweetest Girl"
- Toby Keith – "God Love Her", "Cryin' For Me" and "American Ride"
- Donna Summer – "MacArthur Park", "She Works Hard for the Money", "Smile", "No More Tears", "Bad Girls" and "Last Dance"
- Luis Fonsi – "No me doy por vencido" and "Yo Te Propongo"
- Amadou & Mariam – "Welcome to Mali" and "Beaux Dimanches"
- Alexander Rybak – "Fairytale"
- Esperanza Spalding – "Precious" and "I Know You Know" (special wish from the Peace Prize winner)
- Lang Lang – Rhapsody in Blue
- Natasha Bedingfield – "Pocketful of Sunshine", "Soulmate"
- Westlife – "You Raise Me Up" (featuring Ragnhild Hemsing), "What About Now"
- Norwegian Radio Orchestra conducted by Nick Davies and Jens Wendelboe (Donna Summer set)
- Hearts In Motion Gospel Choir – featured in the finale

The Grand Finale in 2009, sung by all the artists, was Michael Jackson's "Man in the Mirror".

=== 2010 ===
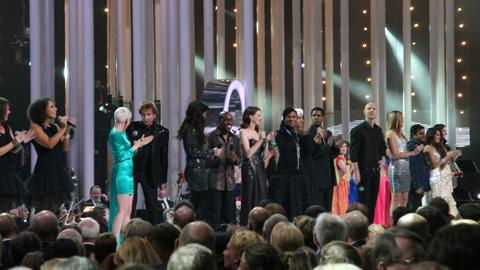
Nobel Peace Prize Concert 2010

Laureate
Liu Xiaobo (absent)

Hosts
Denzel Washington and Anne Hathaway

Artists

- A. R. Rahman – "Slumdog Millionaire Suite", "Jai Ho" featuring Asad Khan
- Herbie Hancock – "Imagine", "Don't Give Up" with Kristina Train, India.Arie and Greg Phillinganes
- India.Arie – "Imagine" and "Don't Give Up" with Herbie Hancock, "Gift of acceptance" featuring Idan Raichel
- Colbie Caillat – "Bubbly", "Fallin' for You"
- Florence and the Machine – "Dog Days Are Over", "Cosmic Love"
- Robyn – "Jeg vet en deilig rose", "Dancing On My Own", "Indestructible"
- Sivert Høyem – "Prisoner of the Road", "Into the Sea"
- Barry Manilow – "Could It Be Magic", "Can't Smile Without You", "Mandy", "Copacabana", "One Voice"
- Jamiroquai – "Canned Heat", "Lifeline", "Virtual Insanity"
- Idan Raichel – "Gift of Acceptance" with India.Arie
- Kristina Train – "Imagine" and "Don't Give Up" with Herbie Hancock
- Greg Phillinganes – "Imagine" and "Don't Give Up" with Herbie Hancock
- Asad Khan – "Jai Ho" with A.R. Rahman
- Ruth Potter, harp (featured in Florence and the Machine set)
- Norwegian Radio Orchestra conducted by Nick Davies (featured in all artists performances)
- Young Norwegian Strings – Rigaudon from the Holberg Suite
- Nobel House Band
- Hearts In Motion Gospel Choir (on Barry Manilow's "One Voice")

All artists performed Michael Jackson's "Man in the Mirror" as the finale to the 2010 Nobel Peace Prize Concert.

=== 2011 ===
Laureates
Ellen Johnson Sirleaf, Leymah Roberta Gbowee and Tawakkol Karman

Hosts
Helen Mirren and Rosario Dawson

Artists

- Janelle Monáe – "Cold War", "I Want You Back", "Tightrope"
- Angélique Kidjo (Leymah Gbowee's personal selection) – "Africa"
- Evanescence – "Lost in Paradise", "Bring Me to Life"
- Ahmed Fathi (Tawakkol Karman's personal selection) – "The Good Spirits"
- Ellie Goulding – "Starry Eyed", "Your Song" (Elton John cover)
- Jill Scott – "Hate on Me", "Golden", "He Loves Me (Lyzel In E Flat)"
- Jarle Bernhoft – "C'mon Talk"
- Sugarland – "Stuck Like Glue", "Tonight"
- David Gray – "Fugitive"
- World Youth Choir – "O Fortuna"
- Miatta Fahnbulleh (Ellen Johnson Sirleaf's personal selection) – "Obaa"
- Norwegian Radio Orchestra conducted by Nick Davies (featured in all artists performances)
- Hearts In Motion Gospel Choir (featured in David Gray's "Fugitive" and Ahmed Fathi's "The Good Spirits")

All artists joined with Angélique Kidjo on the stage singing the song "Move On Up" as the finale to the 2011 Nobel Peace Prize Concert.

=== 2012 ===
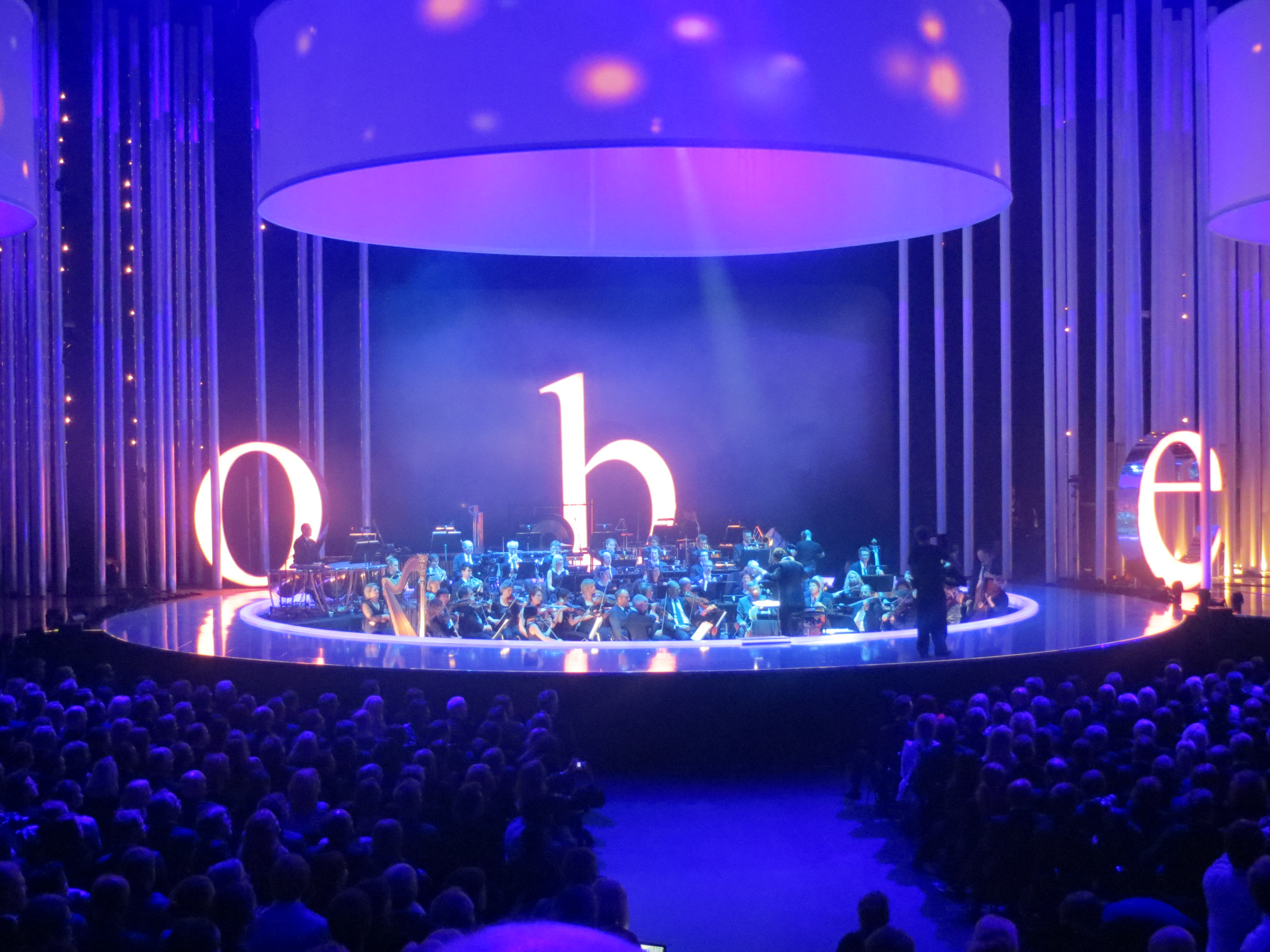
Nobel Peace Prize Concert 2012

Laureate
European Union

Hosts
Sarah Jessica Parker and Gerard Butler

Artists

- Susanne Sundfør – "White Foxes"
- Karpe Diem – "Påfugl" featuring Maria Mena
- Laleh Pourkarim – "Some Die Young"
- Jennifer Hudson – "Night of Your Life" and "I Want to Dance with Somebody" (Finale)
- Kylie Minogue – "On a Night Like This", "Can't Get You Out of My Head"
- Seal – "It's a Man's Man's Man's World", "Kiss from a Rose", "Crazy"
- Fanfare Ciocărlia – "Huricestra"
- OqueStrada – "Oxala Te Veja"
- Ne-Yo – "Let Me Love You"
- Il Volo, "Il Mondo", "We Are Love"
- Milow – "You Don't Know", "You and me"
- Maria Mena – "Påfugl" with Karpe Diem
- Norwegian Radio Orchestra conducted by Nick Davies and Cliff Masterson (Kylie Minogue set) (featured in all artists performances)

=== 2013 ===
Laureate
Organisation for the Prohibition of Chemical Weapons

Hosts
Claire Danes and Aaron Eckhart

Artists

- Mary J. Blige – "Family Affair", "Just Fine", "One" (finale)
- James Blunt – "You're Beautiful", "Bonfire Heart", "No Bravery"
- Envy (aka. Nico & Vinz) – "In Your Arms", "Am I Wrong"
- Zara Larsson – "Uncover"
- Morrissey – "Satellite of Love", "People Are The Same Everywhere", "Irish Blood, English Heart"
- Jake Bugg – "Broken", "A Song About Love"
- Timbuktu feat. Vinni – "Alla Vill Till Himmelen Men Få Vill Ju Dö", "Let The Monkey Out"
- Omar Souleyman – "Salamat Galbi Bidek"
- Norwegian Radio Orchestra conducted by Nick Davies (featured in all performances)
- Mosaic (Gospel Choir) (featured in Envy's "Am I Wrong", Timbuktu's "Alla vill till himmelen men ingen vill dö" and "Let the Monkey Out" and Mary J. Blige's "One")

=== 2014 ===
Laureates
Malala Yousafzai and Kailash Satyarthi

Host
Queen Latifah (also performed two songs during the show: "I Know Where I've Been" and "U.N: I.T.Y.")

Artists

- Gabrielle Leithaug – "5 Fine Frøkner", "I Believe"
- Seinabo Sey – "Younger"
- Nuno Bettencourt – "More Than Words" with Steven Tyler
- Steven Tyler – "Dream On", "Livin' On the Edge", "More than Words"
- Rahat Fateh Ali Khan – "Medley", "Aao Parhao"
- Laura Mvula – "Sing to the Moon", "That's Alright"
- Girls of the World (Juliana Joya, Emily Anne, and Carmen Amare) – "I Am Malala"
- Amjad Ali Khan – "Raga For Peace"
- Bolly Flex Dancers – "Jai Ho", "Chaiya Chaiya", "Nagada Sang Dhol", "One Two Three Four Get"
- Norwegian Radio Orchestra conducted by Nick Davies (featured in all performances)
- Mosaic (Gospel Choir) (featured in Queen Latifah's "I Know Where I've Been", Gabrielle Leithaug's "I Believe", Steven Tyler's "Dream on", Girls of the World's "I Am Malala" and Rahat Fateh Ali Khan's "Aao Parhao")

Much of the concert of 2014 was influenced by Bollywood performances.

=== 2015 ===
Laureates
Tunisian National Dialogue Quartet

Hosts
Jay Leno (main program), Derek Muller (YouTube backstage host)

Artists

- A-ha – "Scoundrel Days", "The Sun Always Shines on TV", "Stay on These Roads", "Sycamore Leaves", "Take On Me Remix" with Kygo
- Aurora – "Murder Song (5, 4, 3, 2, 1)", "Half the World Away", "Runaway"
- Kygo – "Stole the Show" feat Parson James, "Stay" feat Maty Noyes, "Firestone" feat Kurt Nilsen, "Take On Me Remix" feat. A-ha
- Jason Derulo – "Cheyenne", "Want To Want Me"
- Emel Mathlouthi – "Kelmti Horra (My Word Is Free)"
- MØ – "New Year's Eve", "Lean On"
- Parson James – "Stole the Show" with Kygo
- Maty Noyes – "Stay" with Kygo
- Kurt Nilsen – "Firestone" with Kygo
- Norwegian Radio Orchestra (featured in all performances)
- Mosaic Gospel Choir (featured in Jason Derulo and Emel Mathlouthi sets and "Take On Me" finale)

=== 2016 ===
Laureate
President of Colombia Juan Manuel Santos for his peace negotiation efforts with FARC

Host
Conan O'Brien (also performed a short "traditional Norwegian song" based on Jørn Hoel's "Har en drøm" with the orchestra after Halsey's set)

Artists

- Frøder – "Over the Sea"
- Halsey – "Castle", "Colors"
- Highasakite – "Golden Ticket", "Lover, Where Do You Live?"
- Icona Pop – "All Night", "I Love It", "Brightside"
- Juanes – "A Dios le Pido", "Fuego", "La Camisa Negra"
- Marcus & Martinus – "Without You", "Bae"
- Sting – "Fragile", "One Fine Day", "Message in a Bottle", "Every Breath You Take"
- Norwegian Radio Orchestra (featured in all performances)
- Mosaic Gospel Choir (background vocals in Icona Pop and Halsey sets)

=== 2017 ===
Laureate

- International Campaign to Abolish Nuclear Weapons

Host

- David Oyelowo

Artists

- John Legend – "What's Going On", "Penthouse", "Love Me Now", "All of Me", "Glory", "God Only Knows" with Zara Larsson
- Sigrid Raabe – "Strangers", "Dynamite",
- Zara Larsson – "Lush Life", "Symphony", "God Only Knows" with John Legend
- Matoma, "One in a Million", "Slow", "False Alarm"
- Lukas Graham – "Funeral", "7 Years"
- Adam Douglas – "One in a Million" with Matoma
- Shy Martin – "Slow" with Matoma
- Becky Hill – "False Alarm" with Matoma
- Le Petit Cirque – "Hero"
- Norwegian Radio Orchestra conducted by Nick Davies (featured in all performances)
- Nobel House Band (featured in all performances)
- Mosaic Gospel Choir, SiNoRi and Elitekoret (featured in select performances)

One of the surviving Hibaku pianos, a series of pianos that were successfully restored following the Hiroshima and Nagaski atomic bombings in 1945, was featured during the event. It was played by John Legend during his and Zara Larsson's duet. This was the last concert before a hiatus was announced in 2018.

=== 2018 ===
Laureate

- Denis Mukwege and Nadia Murad

No regular Nobel Peace Prize Concert was held in 2018, as the organizers decided to look at the event and make changes. An alternative concert was planned for 9 December 2018. It was estimated that the original Nobel Peace Prize concert will appear again in a different format in 2019, however this has not proven to be the case.

Hosts: Kåre Magnus Bergh and Silje Nordnes

Artists for alternative concert:

- Eivind Buene
- Eva Weel-Skram
- Kurt Nilsen
- Christel Alsos
- Amanda Delara
- Fargespill
- Freddy Kalas
- Matoma
- Vamp
- Wenche Myhre
- Ella Marie Hætta Isaksen
- D.D.E.
- Julie Bergan

=== 2023 ===
The full lineup for this concert wasn't disclosed, but one of the notable headliners was jazz singer Angelina Jordan.

=== 2024 ===
This concert was combined with a talk show that featured halftime performances by the Norwegian Radio Orchestra and several well-known recording artists, but the full lineup wasn't disclosed.

=== 2025 ===
Rather than an actual concert, there were halftime performances by pop singer Danny Ocean and pianist Gabriela Montero, both from Venezuela. Ocean sang a cover "Alma llanera" while Montero played the Venezuelan national anthem and Simón Díaz's classic song "Mi querencia".

=== 2026 ===
It is unknown if there will be a Nobel Peace Prize Concert in 2026.

== International broadcasters ==
Country	Broadcaster
Norway	NRK
Sweden	SVT
Australia	ABC2
Argentina	Channel 7
Brazil	TV Bandeirantes
Denmark	DR K
Iceland	SkjárEinn
India	Zee Café
Indonesia	MetroTV
Italy	Playme.tv, repeat Mediaset
Turkey	TRT
(United Kingdom) UK	Sky Arts
(United States) USA	Fox Broadcasting Company
