= Le Petit Cirque =

American all-youth professional circus company

Le PeTiT CiRqUe
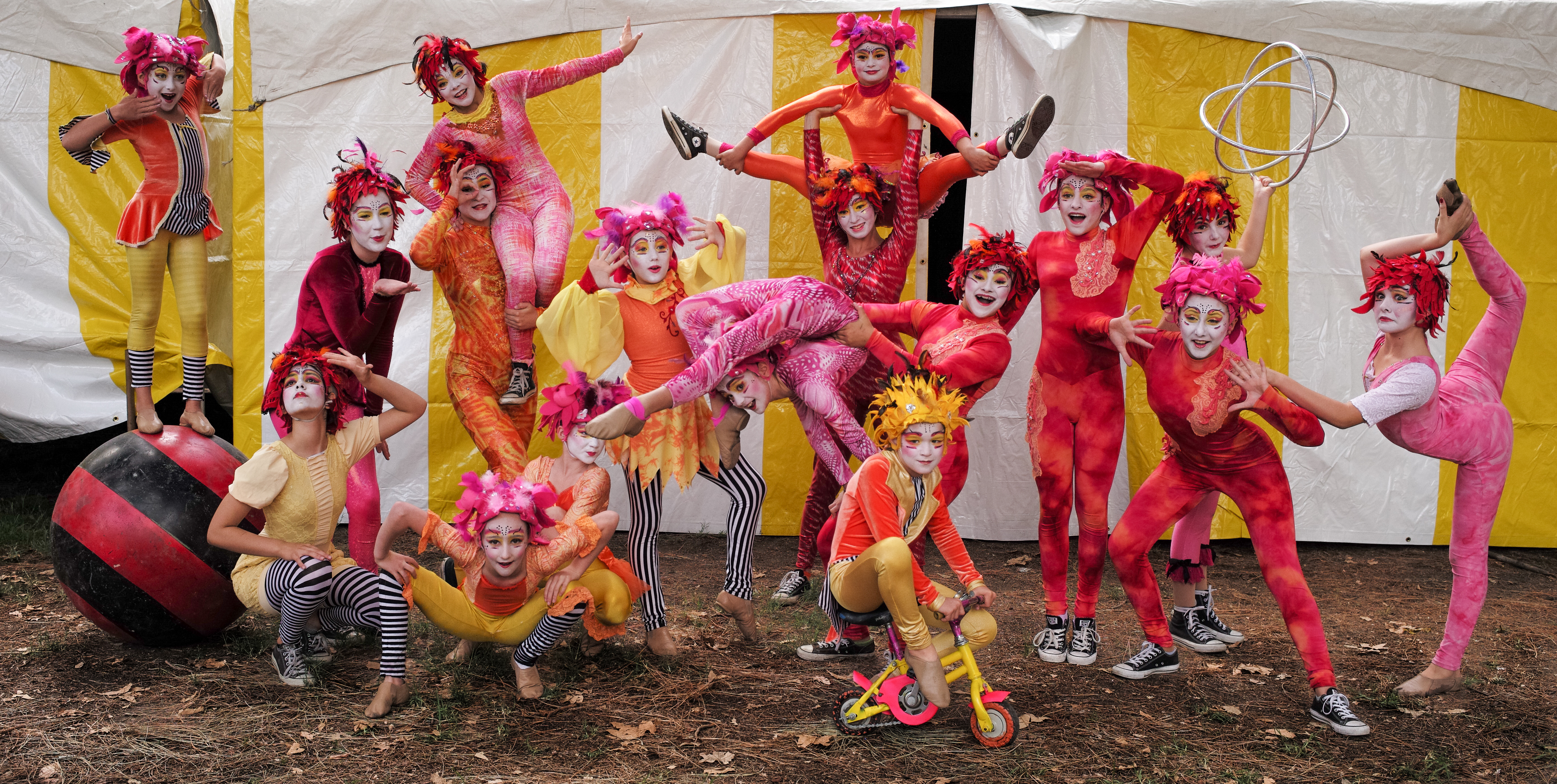
- Type: Privately held company
- Industry: Entertainment
- Founded: 2012
- Founder: Nathalie Yves Gaulthier
- Headquarters: Inglewood, California
- Area served: Worldwide
- Key people: Nathalie Yves Gaulthier, Founder
- Website: www.LPCLA.com

Le PeTiT CiRqUe (Fr, The Little Circus) (pronounced lə pəti siʁk) is an all-youth professional circus company based in Los Angeles, California. LPC was founded in 2012 by Nathalie Yves Gaulthier, a former child actress and competitive gymnast. LPC consists of a wide array of cirque specialists, including acrobats, aerialists, contortionists, hand balancers, and foot archers, and other performing specialists, such as vocalists, dancers, hoop dancers, and martial artists. The troupe has performed in the United States, Canada, Norway, and the United Arab Emirates.

== Humanitarian contributions ==
Nathalie Yves Gaulthier believes cirque is a tool for social change and education. A large percentage of LPC's performances are for charities, especially those that support children's causes. In the children's fundraising arena, Le PeTiT CiRqUe's performances have raised money for at-risk children (Ometz), children with heart disease (Camp del Corazon), hospitalized children (Starlight Children's Foundation), youth athletics (California State Games), children with Treacher Collins Syndrome (Children's Craniofacial Association), and children with life-threatening diseases (Make-A-Wish Foundation). LPC performances have also helped raise funds for world peace (the Norwegian Nobel Institute), Native American scholarships (Theresa A. Mike Scholarship Foundation), breast cancer research (Breast Cancer Research Foundation), animal care (Performing Animal Welfare Society), the performing arts (TuTu Foundation), and homeless veterans (Heroes Helping Heroes).

== Film and television appearances (2017–present) ==
- Little Big Shots US television series
- Little Big Shots Australia television series
- Hallmark Channel's Home & Family Series
- Pickler & Ben television show, Nashville, Tennessee
- Born This Way, A&E US television series
- Saving Flora independent film (2018 release)

== Key performances (2015–present) ==
- Nobel Peace Prize Concert, Telenor Arena, Oslo, Norway
- His Holiness the Dalai Lama Global Summit and Birthday Celebration, Bren Center, University of California Irvine
- Agence Ometz charity fundraisers for children, Place des Arts, Montreal, Canada
- Dream Halloween fundraisers for Starlight Children's Foundation, Los Angeles, California
- Camp del Corazon's's Gala del Sol event to provide summer camp for children with heart disease, Dolby Theatre, Hollywood, California
- Jump, Jive & Thrive to benefit the Breast Cancer Research Foundation, Pauley Pavilion, UCLA, Los Angeles, California
- World Choreography Awards, Saban Theatre, Beverly Hills, California
- Miller Children's Hospital, Long Beach, California

== Awards ==
National Youth Awards, 2016-17

- Outstanding Production, Junior Division
- Outstanding Group Vocal Performance, Junior Division
- Outstanding Direction (to Nathalie Yves Gaulthier)

National Youth Awards, 2015-16

- Outstanding Production, Junior Division
- Outstanding Lead Actor (to Diego Mariano Pasillas)
- Outstanding Lead Actress (to Angelina Capozzoli)
- Outstanding Supporting Actress (to Kaelyn Mei Whaley)
- Outstanding Direction (to Nathalie Yves Gaulthier)

== Collaboration ==
Le PeTiT CiRqUe is not formally affiliated with Cirque du Soleil. But LPC's performers have received instruction at their Los Angeles studio from many current and former Cirque du Soleil artists, including aerialists Uuve Jansson, Ginger Ana Griep-Ruiz, Zoe Sabattie, Lisanna Paloma, Stuart McKenzie, and Petra Sprecher; contortionist Otgo Waller; hand balancers Tatiana Gousarova and Olga Pikhienko; acrobat Galabina Kamemova; physical actor Joshua Zehner; and choreographers Alixa Sutton, Alain Gauthier, and Debra Lynne Brown. One of LPC's current aerialists, Ellowyn Stanton, will appear as a series regular in a new Cirque du Soleil-sponsored television show about a group of young performers attending a circus school.
