= The Randies =

The Randies are a female-fronted punk rock band from Los Angeles, California. They have been featured in Blender, as well as selected as the featured artists of the month on Fender's website. The Randies have produced two full-length albums, and also two music videos for songs from their second release. They toured often, only taking a few months off at a time when they reach their home in California. Their most recent major appearance was on the Vans Warped Tour in summer of 2008.

The band hasn't played together since April, 2009 when their van, containing all of their instruments and gear, was stolen in Silverlake, California the night before a scheduled concert.

== Band members ==
Sienna DeGovia plays the bass guitar and sings both lead and back-up vocals. Laura Cataldo plays rhythm guitar and sings back-up vocals. Laurita Guaico Harrison plays lead guitar and sings both lead and back-up vocals. The drummer on the last recorded album was Aaron Polk, however, he is no longer with the band. The last touring drummer was Joel Ronamoe, also of Duane Peters Gunfight. For the 2008 tour, Tosha Jones, formerly of Emerson Rose, joined up as the drummer. Tosha joined Saliva in 2018. Former members include Megan McCarter on Guitar and Mark Powell (Kosmos Express, The Get Set) on Drums.

== Awards ==
The Randies were nominated and won the award for "Punk Rock Night's Sexiest Band of 2006" at the 2006 Punk Rock Night Awards Show held at The Historic Melody Inn in Indianapolis, Indiana. The band was also nominated for the 8th Annual Independent Music Awards Punk Song of the year for "Change The Conversation".

== Albums ==
At the Friendship Motor Inn (2004)

1. "Boys in Stereo"
2. "Threadbare"
3. "Dreamdate"
4. "Hyperion"
5. "Cookie"
6. "The Way It Goes"
7. "Good for You"
8. "Iron Monkey"
9. "Put Out"
10. "Make It Right"
11. "Kevin Bacon"
12. "Star"

Saw The Light (2006)

1. "Freezerburn"
2. "Thought I Could Change"
3. "Born Again"
4. "Up In Lights"
5. "Socialite (Kiss or Kill)"
6. "Wrecking Ball (The Shovel Song)"
7. "Boxing Day"
8. "Breakfast Worthy"
9. "Broken Man"
10. "Dig Me a Hole"
11. "Move On"

Also featured on

- Warped Tour 2008 Tour Compilation
